= List of South Africa national rugby union players =

South Africa national rugby union team players hold several international records. Several players from the South Africa national rugby union team have joined the IRB and International Hall of Fame.

== Individual records ==
=== Career ===
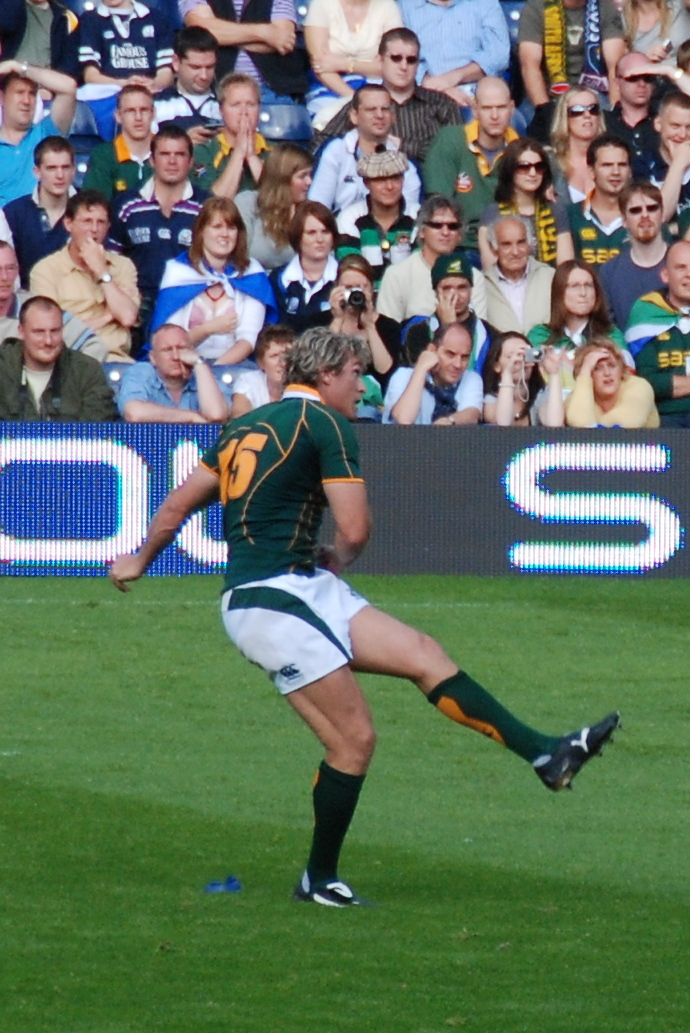
Percy Montgomery holds the South African record for Test points

South Africa's most capped player is Eben Etzebeth with 147 caps. Matfield was the most-capped lock for any nation in rugby history, with all of his 127 appearances at that position in 2011, this record has now been overtaken by Alun Wyn Jones. The most-capped back is Bryan Habana, with 124 caps over a thirteen year career. Percy Montgomery holds the South African record for Test points with 893, which at the time of his international retirement placed him sixth on the all-time list of Test point scorers (he now stands eleventh).^{(as at 10 December 2019)}

Morné Steyn holds the Springbok record for the fastest 100 points (8 Test matches)

Although statistics on the success rate of kicks at goal were not kept until the late 1980s, it is believed that Steyn also holds the record for most consecutive successful kicks at goal in Tests. He had a streak of 41 successful kicks at goal, which started during the Boks' Test against Italy on 19 June 2010 and ended on 6 November 2010 against Ireland.

John Smit was the world's most-capped captain, having captained South Africa in 82 of his 111 Tests. He has since been overtaken by Richie McCaw and Brian O'Driscoll. The world's most-capped lock pairing is that of Victor Matfield and Bakkies Botha, who have started together in 62 Tests. Smit also played 46 consecutive matches for South Africa, which is a record.

The record try scorer is Bryan Habana with 67 international tries.^{(as at 14 February 2018)}

=== Single match ===
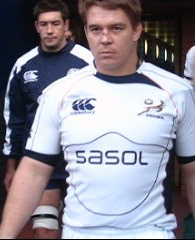
John Smit, the Springbok player in most consecutive test matches retired end 2011

Fly-half Jannie de Beer holds the world record for dropped goals in a Test match (5, during the 44–21 quarter-final win over England in the 1999 Rugby World Cup)

The most points Montgomery ever scored in a single international was 35 against Namibia in 2007—this is also a South African record. This record has since been beaten by Sacha Feinberg-Mngomezulu, who scored 37 points in a single game. Feinberg-Mngomezulu achieved this feat during a Rugby Championship match against Argentina in September 2025.

On 1 August during the 2009 Tri Nations tournament, Morné Steyn set a number of records during the second Test between the Springboks and the All Blacks. The Springboks won 31–19, with Steyn scoring all South Africa's points – 1 try, 1 conversion, 8 penalties. This gave him records for:

- Most points scored by any player in a Tri Nations match, surpassing Andrew Mehrtens (All Blacks vs. Australia, 1999).
- Most points ever scored by an individual in a Test against the All Blacks, passing Christophe Lamaison's 29 (France, 1999).
- World record for most points scored by a player who has scored all their team's points.
- South African record for penalties in a test (8) – beating the seven achieved twice by Montgomery.

== Hall of Fame players ==
Eleven former South African international players have been inducted into either the International Rugby Hall of Fame or the IRB Hall of Fame. Six are members of the International Rugby Hall of Fame only; two are members of the IRB Hall of Fame only, and four are members of both Halls of Fame.

Barry "Fairy" Heatlie, who played in the late 19th century and into the early 20th, was one of the early greats of South African rugby. He appeared for Western Province 34 times between 1890 and 1904, with 28 of them being Currie Cup wins. He also played six Tests for South Africa against the Lions in 1891, 1896, and 1903, and also captained the side to their only two Test wins of the 1890s. Arguably his greatest legacy to South African rugby is the green jersey; he is credited with introducing the colour for South Africa's 1903 Test against the Lions at Newlands. He was inducted into the IRB Hall of Fame in 2009.

Bennie Osler played 17 consecutive Tests between 1924 and 1933. Playing at fly-half, his first Test was against the touring British team in 1924. He also played in the series against the All Blacks in 1928, but most notably captained the Springboks on their Grand Slam tour of 1931–32 when they defeated all four Home Nations. His last Tests were the five played against Australia when they toured to South Africa in 1933. Osler was inducted to the International Rugby Hall of Fame in 2007 and the IRB Hall of Fame in 2009.

Making his Test debut in Olser's Grand Slam winning team in 1931 was scrum-half Danie Craven. Craven played several positions including fly-half, scrum-half, centre and even number-eight. However Craven was most famous for popularising the dive pass. As well as winning a Grand Slam with Osler's team, Craven toured with 1937 Springboks to New Zealand where they achieved their first series victory over New Zealand. His last act as player was captaining South Africa in a Test series against the Lions. Craven's involvement with the Springboks continued after his playing retirement, and he coached them to a 4–0 series win over the touring All Blacks in 1949. He was elected President of the South African Rugby Board in 1956, a position he held until the post-apartheid South African Rugby Union was formed in 1991. Craven was instrumental in the formation of the South African Rugby Union and became its first Executive President. Such was Craven's influence in South African rugby he became known as "Mr Rugby", was inducted into the International Hall of Fame in 1997, and was in the second class of inductees into the IRB Hall of Fame in 2007; behind Rugby School and William Webb Ellis.

The man most credited with inventing modern number 8 play was Hennie Muller, inducted into the International Hall of Fame in 2001. He played 13 Tests between 1949 and 1953, and in the process won a 4–0 series victory over the All Blacks and a Grand Slam tour of Britain and Ireland. He was nicknamed Windhond (greyhound) for his speed around the field. When writing about the 1949 series against the All Blacks, Harding and Williams wrote: "(Okey) Geffin won the series, perhaps, but Muller made it possible." Of Muller's 13 Tests, he only lost one—against Australia in 1953.

Named South Africa's player of the 20th Century in 2000, Frik du Preez played 38 Tests between 1961 and 1971. Du Preez could play both flanker or lock and was one of the most dominant forwards of the 1960s, but was especially well known for his all round skills. Danie Craven said of du Preez, "To my mind he could have played any position on a rugby field with equal brilliance." He was inducted into the International Rugby Hall of Fame in 1997 and the IRB Hall of Fame in 2009.

Morné du Plessis played 22 Tests for South Africa between 1971 and 1980. His debut was at Number 8 in South Africa's series win over Australia in 1971. He went on to captain South Africa and became part of the only father-son pair to captain South Africa—his father had captained South Africa in 1949. He led South Africa to a 3–1 series win over the All Blacks in 1976 and a series win over the British and Irish Lions in 1980 by the same margin. Du Plessis would be inducted into the International Hall of Fame in 1999.

International Hall of Fame inductees Naas Botha, inducted in 2005, and Danie Gerber, inducted in 2007, both had careers interrupted by South Africa's sporting isolation in the 1980s and early 1990s. Botha made his Test debut against the South American Jaguars in 1980. Playing at fly-half, Botha played 28 Tests and scored 312 Test points before his international retirement in 1992. Botha contributed significantly to the Springboks 1980 series win over the Lions, and also played for the World XV in the IRB Centenary Match at Twickenham. Gerber also made his debut in 1980, and scored 19 tries in his 24 Tests before retiring in 1992. He scored a hat-trick against England in 1984, and played alongside Botha in the World XV team in 1986. In South Africa's first Test since the fall of apartheid, against the All Blacks in 1992, he scored twice.

Two players that straddled the amateur and professional eras were Francois Pienaar and Joost van der Westhuizen. Both first played for the Springboks in 1993. Pienaar was named captain in his first Test against France, and went on to captain the side to the 1995 World Cup. It was there he captained South Africa to the World Cup title, and received the trophy from Nelson Mandela who was wearing his number 6 jersey. Nelson Mandela later wrote "It was under Francois Pienaar's inspiring leadership that rugby became the pride of the entire country. Francois brought the nation together." Pienaar entered the International Hall of Fame in 2005, and was inducted into the IRB Hall in 2011 alongside all other World Cup-winning captains from the inaugural event in 1987 through 2007 (minus the previously inducted Australian John Eales). Joost van der Westhuizen also participated in the 1995 World cup victory, but went on to play in two more World Cups. Playing at scrum-half, van der Westhuizen played 89 Tests for South Africa and scored 38 tries. At the time of his retirement following the 2003 World Cup he was South Africa's leading try scorer and most capped player. He entered the International Hall of Fame two years after Pienaar, in 2007.

The newest Springbok players to enter the IRB Hall of Fame are John Smit, inducted in 2011 alongside Pienaar, and Bryan Habana, who received this honor for his remarkable contributions to South African rugby. Habana's induction into the Hall of Fame was officially recognized by World Rugby, as announced in a press release on the Rugby World Cup website. Habana, renowned for his outstanding achievements on the international stage, became the second Springbok to receive the World Rugby Player of the Year award after Schalk Burger in 2004. His induction into the Hall of Fame acknowledges his exceptional career, which included becoming the Springboks' all-time leading try-scorer and drawing level with Jonah Lomu as the men's Rugby World Cup all-time leading try scorer.

== List ==
As of 29 August 2026, 958 South African rugby union players have represented the Springboks, either by playing in a test match or touring with the national side.

Players included in the current squad as of 7 November 2026 are indicated in green.

List of South Africa national rugby union players
Number	Name	Test debut	Debut opposition	Caps	Points	Tries	Cons	Pens	DGs
1	Benjamin Duff	30 July 1891	Britain	3	0	0	0	0	0
2	Mosey van Buuren	30 July 1891	Britain	1	0	0	0	0	0
3	Chubb Vigne	30 July 1891	Britain	3	0	0	0	0	0
4	Harry Boyes	30 July 1891	Britain	2	0	0	0	0	0
5	Frank Guthrie	30 July 1891	Britain	3	0	0	0	0	0
6	Alf Richards	30 July 1891	Britain	3	0	0	0	0	0
7	Oupa Versfeld	30 July 1891	Britain	3	0	0	0	0	0
8	Bill Bisset	30 July 1891	Britain	2	0	0	0	0	0
9	H. H. Castens	30 July 1891	Britain	1	0	0	0	0	0
10	Tiger Devenish	30 July 1891	Britain	1	0	0	0	0	0
11	Japie Louw	30 July 1891	Britain	3	0	0	0	0	0
12	Edward Little	30 July 1891	Britain	2	0	0	0	0	0
13	Fred Alexander	30 July 1891	Britain	2	0	0	0	0	0
14	George Merry	30 July 1891	Britain	1	0	0	0	0	0
15	Frank Hamilton	30 July 1891	Britain	1	0	0	0	0	0
16	Arthur de Kock	29 August 1891	Britain	1	0	0	0	0	0
17	Jackie Powell	29 August 1891	Britain	4	0	0	0	0	0
18	Bob Snedden	29 August 1891	Britain	1	0	0	0	0	0
19	Bob Shand	29 August 1891	Britain	2	0	0	0	0	0
20	Wilfred Trenery	29 August 1891	Britain	1	0	0	0	0	0
21	Dan Smith	29 August 1891	Britain	1	0	0	0	0	0
22	Fairy Heatlie	29 August 1891	Britain	6	6	0	3	0	0
23	Toski Smith	29 August 1891	Britain	3	0	0	0	0	0
24	Jack Hartley	5 September 1891	Britain	1	0	0	0	0	0
25	Hasie Versfeld	5 September 1891	Britain	1	0	0	0	0	0
26	Charlie van Renen	5 September 1891	Britain	3	0	0	0	0	0
27	Jim McKendrick	5 September 1891	Britain	1	0	0	0	0	0
28	Charlie Chignell	5 September 1891	Britain	1	0	0	0	0	0
29	Dykie Lyons	30 July 1896	Britain	1	0	0	0	0	0
30	Percy Twentyman-Jones	30 July 1896	Britain	3	3	1	0	0	0
31	Biddy Anderson	30 July 1896	Britain	3	0	0	0	0	0
32	Ferdie Aston	30 July 1896	Britain	4	0	0	0	0	0
33	Ernest Olver	30 July 1896	Britain	1	0	0	0	0	0
34	Francis Myburg	30 July 1896	Britain	1	0	0	0	0	0
35	Scraps Wessels	30 July 1896	Britain	3	0	0	0	0	0
36	Paul Scott	30 July 1896	Britain	4	0	0	0	0	0
37	Henry Gorton	30 July 1896	Britain	1	0	0	0	0	0
38	PJ Meyer	30 July 1896	Britain	1	0	0	0	0	0
39	Mike Bredenkamp	30 July 1896	Britain	2	0	0	0	0	0
40	Frank Douglass	30 July 1896	Britain	1	0	0	0	0	0
41	Davey Cope	22 August 1896	Britain	1	2	0	1	0	0
42	Spanner Forbes	22 August 1896	Britain	1	0	0	0	0	0
43	Bill Taberer	22 August 1896	Britain	1	0	0	0	0	0
44	Theo Samuels	22 August 1896	Britain	3	6	2	0	0	0
45	Long George Devenish	22 August 1896	Britain	1	0	0	0	0	0
46	Alf Larard	22 August 1896	Britain	2	3	1	0	0	0
47	John 'Ben' Andrew	22 August 1896	Britain	1	0	0	0	0	0
48	Tom Mellett	22 August 1896	Britain	1	0	0	0	0	0
49	Allan Beswick	22 August 1896	Britain	3	0	0	0	0	0
50	Charlie Devenish	22 August 1896	Britain	1	0	0	0	0	0
51	Jim Crosby	22 August 1896	Britain	1	0	0	0	0	0
52	Bertie Powell	29 August 1896	Britain	1	0	0	0	0	0
53	Bill Cotty	29 August 1896	Britain	1	0	0	0	0	0
54	Pieter Dormehl	29 August 1896	Britain	2	0	0	0	0	0
55	Ted Kelly	29 August 1896	Britain	1	0	0	0	0	0
56	Danie Theunissen	29 August 1896	Britain	1	0	0	0	0	0
57	Tommy Hepburn	5 September 1896	Britain	1	2	0	1	0	0
58	Tommy Etlinger	5 September 1896	Britain	1	0	0	0	0	0
59	Broekie van Broekhuizen	5 September 1896	Britain	1	0	0	0	0	0
60	Paul de Waal	5 September 1896	Britain	1	0	0	0	0	0
61	Patats Cloete	5 September 1896	Britain	1	0	0	0	0	0
62	Charlie Jones	29 August 1903	Britain	2	0	0	0	0	0
63	Joe Barry	29 August 1903	Britain	3	3	1	0	0	0
64	Japie Krige	29 August 1903	Britain	5	3	1	0	0	0
65	Bertie van Renen	29 August 1903	Britain	2	0	0	0	0	0
66	Andrew Morkel	29 August 1903	Britain	1	0	0	0	0	0
67	Uncle Dobbin	29 August 1903	Britain	9	3	1	0	0	0
68	Alex Frew	29 August 1903	Britain	1	3	1	0	0	0
69	Bill McEwan	29 August 1903	Britain	2	0	0	0	0	0
70	Jimmy Sinclair	29 August 1903	Britain	1	0	0	0	0	0
71	Klondyke Raaff	29 August 1903	Britain	6	3	1	0	0	0
72	PO Nel	29 August 1903	Britain	3	0	0	0	0	0
73	Birdie Partridge	29 August 1903	Britain	1	0	0	0	0	0
74	Charlie Brown	29 August 1903	Britain	3	0	0	0	0	0
75	Syd de Melker	5 September 1903	Britain	2	0	0	0	0	0
76	Syd Ashley	5 September 1903	Britain	1	0	0	0	0	0
77	Bertie Gibbs	5 September 1903	Britain	1	0	0	0	0	0
78	Clem Currie	5 September 1903	Britain	1	0	0	0	0	0
79	Henry Metcalf	5 September 1903	Britain	1	0	0	0	0	0
80	Jack Jackson	5 September 1903	Britain	1	0	0	0	0	0
81	George Crampton	5 September 1903	Britain	1	0	0	0	0	0
82	Rajah Martheze	5 September 1903	Britain	3	0	0	0	0	0
83	Paddy Carolin	12 September 1903	Britain	3	0	0	0	0	0
84	Hugh Ferris	12 September 1903	Britain	1	0	0	0	0	0
85	Bob Loubser	12 September 1903	Britain	7	9	3	0	0	0
86	Tommy Hobson	12 September 1903	Britain	1	0	0	0	0	0
87	Alec Reid	12 September 1903	Britain	1	3	1	0	0	0
88	Paul Roos	12 September 1903	Britain	4	0	0	0	0	0
89	Joe Anderson	12 September 1903	Britain	1	0	0	0	0	0
90	John Botha	12 September 1903	Britain	1	0	0	0	0	0
91	Arthur Burmeister			0					
92	Arthur Marsberg	17 November 1906	Scotland	3	0	0	0	0	0
93	Anton Stegmann	17 November 1906	Scotland	2	3	1	0	0	0
94	Japie le Roux			0					
95	Boy de Villiers	17 November 1906	Scotland	3	0	0	0	0	0
96	John Hirsch	24 November 1906	Ireland	2	0	0	0	0	0
97	Mary Jackson	24 November 1906	Ireland	3	0	0	0	0	0
98	Dietlof Maré	17 November 1906	Scotland	1	0	0	0	0	0
99	Bingo Burger	17 November 1906	Scotland	4	0	0	0	0	0
100	Cocky Brooks	17 November 1906	Scotland	1	0	0	0	0	0
101	William Neill			0					
102	Pinkie Daneel	17 November 1906	Scotland	4	0	0	0	0	0
103	Pietie le Roux	24 November 1906	Ireland	3	0	0	0	0	0
104	Koei Brink	17 November 1906	Scotland	3	0	0	0	0	0
105	Sommie Morkel	17 November 1906	Scotland	4	0	0	0	0	0
106	Dougie Morkel	24 November 1906	Ireland	9	38	3	7	5	0
107	Bert Reid			0					
108	Adam Burdett	17 November 1906	Scotland	2	0	0	0	0	0
109	Billy Millar	8 December 1906	England	6	6	2	0	0	0
110	Stevie Joubert	24 November 1906	Ireland	3	8	1	1	1	0
111	Archie Marsberg	6 August 1910	Britain	1	0	0	0	0	0
112	Dirkie de Villiers	6 August 1910	Britain	3	3	1	0	0	0
113	Cocky Hahn	6 August 1910	Britain	3	3	1	0	0	0
114	Lammetjie Luyt	6 August 1910	Britain	7	8	2	1	0	0
115	Henry Walker	6 August 1910	Britain	3	0	0	0	0	0
116	Nic Crosby	6 August 1910	Britain	2	0	0	0	0	0
117	Cliff Riordan	6 August 1910	Britain	2	0	0	0	0	0
118	Noel Howe-Browne	6 August 1910	Britain	3	0	0	0	0	0
119	Max Davison	6 August 1910	Britain	1	0	0	0	0	0
120	Arthur Williams	6 August 1910	Britain	1	0	0	0	0	0
121	Percy Allport	27 August 1910	Britain	2	3	1	0	0	0
122	Dick Luyt	27 August 1910	Britain	7	3	1	0	0	0
123	Wally Mills	27 August 1910	Britain	1	3	1	0	0	0
124	Clive van Ryneveld	27 August 1910	Britain	2	0	0	0	0	0
125	Toby Moll	27 August 1910	Britain	1	0	0	0	0	0
126	Gideon Roos	27 August 1910	Britain	2	3	1	0	0	0
127	Antonie Lombard	27 August 1910	Britain	1	0	0	0	0	0
128	Boy Morkel	3 September 1910	Britain	9	6	2	0	0	0
129	Koot Reynecke	3 September 1910	Britain	1	3	1	0	0	0
130	Gerhard Morkel	23 November 1912	Scotland	8	16	0	6	0	1
131	Cooper Meintjes			0					
132	Jan Stegmann	23 November 1912	Scotland	5	15	5	0	0	0
133	Apie van der Hoff			0					
134	Boetie McHardy	23 November 1912	Scotland	5	18	6	0	0	0
135	Bai Wrentmore			0					
136	Wakkie Krige			0					
137	Jacky Morkel	23 November 1912	Scotland	5	16	4	2	0	0
138	John McCulloch	4 January 1913	England	2	0	0	0	0	0
139	Jack Immelman	11 January 1913	France	1	0	0	0	0	0
140	Baby Shum	4 January 1913	England	1	0	0	0	0	0
141	Tom van Vuuren	23 November 1912	Scotland	5	0	0	0	0	0
142	Tommy Thompson	23 November 1912	Scotland	3	0	0	0	0	0
143	Saturday Knight	23 November 1912	Scotland	5	0	0	0	0	0
144	Fanie Cronjé			0					
145	Ned Delaney			0					
146	Sep Ledger	23 November 1912	Scotland	4	3	1	0	0	0
147	Louis Louw			0					
148	Joe Francis	23 November 1912	Scotland	5	6	2	0	0	0
149	Jack Braine			0					
150	John Luyt	23 November 1912	Scotland	4	0	0	0	0	0
151	IB de Villiers			0					
152	Attie van Heerden	13 August 1921	New Zealand	2	3	1	0	0	0
153	Bill Zeller	27 August 1921	New Zealand	2	0	0	0	0	0
154	Jackie Weepner			0					
155	Henry Morkel	13 August 1921	New Zealand	2	0	0	0	0	0
156	Billy Sendin	27 August 1921	New Zealand	1	3	1	0	0	0
157	Wally Clarkson	13 August 1921	New Zealand	3	0	0	0	0	0
158	Sarel Strauss	17 September 1921	New Zealand	1	0	0	0	0	0
159	Charlie Meyer	13 August 1921	New Zealand	3	0	0	0	0	0
160	Sas de Kock	17 September 1921	New Zealand	2	0	0	0	0	0
161	Jackie Tindall	16 August 1924	Britain	5	0	0	0	0	0
162	Mannetjies Michau	13 August 1921	New Zealand	3	0	0	0	0	0
163	Taffy Townsend	13 August 1921	New Zealand	1	0	0	0	0	0
164	Theo Pienaar			0					
165	Mervyn Ellis	27 August 1921	New Zealand	6	0	0	0	0	0
166	Nick du Plessis	27 August 1921	New Zealand	5	0	0	0	0	0
167	Tank van Rooyen	27 August 1921	New Zealand	2	0	0	0	0	0
168	Baby Michau	13 August 1921	New Zealand	1	0	0	0	0	0
169	Theuns Kruger	13 August 1921	New Zealand	8	0	0	0	0	0
170	Alf Walker	13 August 1921	New Zealand	6	0	0	0	0	0
171	Royal Morkel	27 August 1921	New Zealand	2	0	0	0	0	0
172	Frank Mellish	13 August 1921	New Zealand	6	0	0	0	0	0
173	Harry Morkel	13 August 1921	New Zealand	1	0	0	0	0	0
174	Fien Olivier			0					
175	Jack Siedle			0					
176	Phil Mostert	13 August 1921	New Zealand	14	6	1	0	1	0
177	Tokkie Scholtz	13 August 1921	New Zealand	2	0	0	0	0	0
178	Hans Aucamp	16 August 1924	Britain	2	3	1	0	0	0
179	Pieter Kuyper Albertyn	16 August 1924	Britain	4	3	1	0	0	0
180	Kenny Starke	16 August 1924	Britain	4	13	3	0	0	1
181	Bennie Osler	16 August 1924	Britain	17	46	2	6	4	4
182	Champion Myburgh	16 August 1924	Britain	1	0	0	0	0	0
183	Cecil (Bill) Payn	16 August 1924	Britain	2	0	0	0	0	0
184	Jack van Druten	16 August 1924	Britain	8	6	2	0	0	0
185	Nico Bosman	23 August 1924	Britain	3	0	0	0	0	0
186	Jack Bester	23 August 1924	Britain	2	3	1	0	0	0
187	Pally Truter	23 August 1924	Britain	2	0	0	0	0	0
188	Jack Slater	13 September 1924	Britain	3	6	2	0	0	0
189	Dauncey Devine	13 September 1924	Britain	2	0	0	0	0	0
190	Bertram Vanderplank	13 September 1924	Britain	2	0	0	0	0	0
191	Paul la Grange	13 September 1924	Britain	2	0	0	0	0	0
192	Boet Prinsloo	30 June 1928	New Zealand	1	0	0	0	0	0
193	Stanley Osler	30 June 1928	New Zealand	1	0	0	0	0	0
194	Bernie Duffy	30 June 1928	New Zealand	1	0	0	0	0	0
195	Pierre de Villiers	30 June 1928	New Zealand	8	0	0	0	0	0
196	SP van Wyk	30 June 1928	New Zealand	2	0	0	0	0	0
197	George Daneel	30 June 1928	New Zealand	8	6	2	0	0	0
198	Nic Pretorius	30 June 1928	New Zealand	4	0	0	0	0	0
199	Phil Nel	30 June 1928	New Zealand	16	3	1	0	0	0
200	Hennie Potgieter	30 June 1928	New Zealand	2	0	0	0	0	0
201	Jacko Tod	21 July 1928	New Zealand	1	0	0	0	0	0
202	John Dobie	21 July 1928	New Zealand	1	0	0	0	0	0
203	JC van der Westhuizen	21 July 1928	New Zealand	4	3	1	0	0	0
204	Gerry Brand	21 July 1928	New Zealand	16	55	0	13	7	2
205	Manus de Jongh	18 August 1928	New Zealand	1	3	1	0	0	0
206	Willie Rousseau	18 August 1928	New Zealand	2	0	0	0	0	0
207	Boy Louw	18 August 1928	New Zealand	18	6	2	0	0	0
208	Andries du Toit	18 August 1928	New Zealand	2	0	0	0	0	0
209	John Oliver	18 August 1928	New Zealand	2	0	0	0	0	0
210	Jock van Niekerk	1 September 1928	New Zealand	1	0	0	0	0	0
211	Pieter Morkel	1 September 1928	New Zealand	1	0	0	0	0	0
212	Morris Zimerman	5 December 1931	Wales	4	3	1	0	0	0
213	Ponie van der Westhuizen	19 December 1931	Ireland	3	0	0	0	0	0
214	Floors Venter	5 December 1931	Wales	3	0	0	0	0	0
215	Geoff Gray	5 December 1931	Wales	4	0	0	0	0	0
216	Frankie Waring	19 December 1931	Ireland	7	6	2	0	0	0
217	Jimmy White	5 December 1931	Wales	10	7	1	0	0	1
218	Tiny Francis			0					
219	Danie Craven	5 December 1931	Wales	16	9	3	0	0	0
220	Schalk du Toit			0					
221	Alvi van der Merwe	5 December 1931	Wales	1	0	0	0	0	0
222	Fanie Louw	8 July 1933	Australia	12	3	1	0	0	0
223	André McDonald	5 December 1931	Wales	4	0	0	0	0	0
224	Lukas Strachan	2 January 1932	England	10	0	0	0	0	0
225	Nick Bierman	19 December 1931	Ireland	1	0	0	0	0	0
226	Bert Kipling	5 December 1931	Wales	9	0	0	0	0	0
227	Manie Geere	8 July 1933	Australia	5	0	0	0	0	0
228	Ferdie Bergh	5 December 1931	Wales	17	21	7	0	0	0
229	Skaap Forrest			0					
230	Jack Dold			0					
231	Dai Williams	26 June 1937	Australia	8	15	5	0	0	0
232	Freddy Turner	8 July 1933	Australia	11	29	4	4	3	0
233	Jack Gage	8 July 1933	Australia	1	0	0	0	0	0
234	Fronie Froneman	8 July 1933	Australia	1	0	0	0	0	0
235	George D'Alton	8 July 1933	Australia	1	0	0	0	0	0
236	Pat Lyster	22 July 1933	Australia	3	0	0	0	0	0
237	Paul Visser	22 July 1933	Australia	1	0	0	0	0	0
238	Joe Nijkamp	22 July 1933	Australia	1	0	0	0	0	0
239	Lappies Hattingh	22 July 1933	Australia	1	0	0	0	0	0
240	Ginger Clark	12 August 1933	Australia	1	0	0	0	0	0
241	Fred Smollan	12 August 1933	Australia	3	0	0	0	0	0
242	Bunny Reid	26 August 1933	Australia	1	0	0	0	0	0
243	John Apsey	26 August 1933	Australia	3	0	0	0	0	0
244	Tallie Broodryk			0					
245	Dendy Lawton			0					
246	Louis Babrow	26 June 1937	Australia	5	9	3	0	0	0
247	Johnny Bester	3 September 1938	Britain	2	6	2	0	0	0
248	Koffie Hofmeyr			0					
249	Flappie Lochner	25 September 1937	New Zealand	3	3	1	0	0	0
250	Daantjie van de Vyver	17 July 1937	Australia	1	0	0	0	0	0
251	Tony Harris	4 September 1937	New Zealand	5	3	1	0	0	0
252	Ebbo Bastard	26 June 1937	Australia	6	6	2	0	0	0
253	Ben du Toit	6 August 1938	Britain	3	3	1	0	0	0
254	CB Jennings	14 August 1937	New Zealand	1	0	0	0	0	0
255	Jan Lotz	26 June 1937	Australia	8	3	1	0	0	0
256	Kalfie Martin	17 July 1937	Australia	1	0	0	0	0	0
257	Roger Sherriff	6 August 1938	Britain	3	0	0	0	0	0
258	Mauritz van den Berg	26 June 1937	Australia	4	0	0	0	0	0
259	George van Reenen	17 July 1937	Australia	2	6	2	0	0	0
260	Howard Watt			0					
261	Piet de Wet	6 August 1938	Britain	3	0	0	0	0	0
262	George Smith	10 September 1938	Britain	1	0	0	0	0	0
263	Jack van der Schyff	16 July 1949	New Zealand	5	10	0	2	2	0
264	Buks Marais	16 July 1949	New Zealand	5	10	1	2	1	0
265	Floors Duvenhage	16 July 1949	New Zealand	2	0	0	0	0	0
266	Tjol Lategan	16 July 1949	New Zealand	11	9	3	0	0	0
267	Cecil Moss	16 July 1949	New Zealand	4	0	0	0	0	0
268	Hannes Brewis	16 July 1949	New Zealand	10	18	1	0	1	4
269	Ballie Wahl	16 July 1949	New Zealand	1	0	0	0	0	0
270	Okey Geffin	16 July 1949	New Zealand	7	48	0	9	10	0
271	Jorrie Jordaan	16 July 1949	New Zealand	4	0	0	0	0	0
272	Hoppie van Jaarsveld	16 July 1949	New Zealand	1	0	0	0	0	0
273	Fiks van der Merwe	16 July 1949	New Zealand	1	0	0	0	0	0
274	Bubbles Koch	16 July 1949	New Zealand	4	0	0	0	0	0
275	Felix du Plessis	16 July 1949	New Zealand	3	0	0	0	0	0
276	Ou-Boet Strydom	16 July 1949	New Zealand	2	0	0	0	0	0
277	Hennie Muller	16 July 1949	New Zealand	13	16	3	2	1	0
278	Ryk van Schoor	13 August 1949	New Zealand	12	6	2	0	0	0
279	Fonnie du Toit	13 August 1949	New Zealand	8	6	2	0	0	0
280	Chris Koch	13 August 1949	New Zealand	22	15	5	0	0	0
281	Salty du Rand	13 August 1949	New Zealand	21	12	4	0	0	0
282	Flip Geel	3 September 1949	New Zealand	1	0	0	0	0	0
283	Carrots Geraghty	17 September 1949	New Zealand	1	0	0	0	0	0
284	Piet Malan	17 September 1949	New Zealand	1	0	0	0	0	0
285	Willem Barnard	17 September 1949	New Zealand	2	0	0	0	0	0
286	Basil Kenyon	17 September 1949	New Zealand	1	0	0	0	0	0
287	Johnny Buchler	24 November 1951	Scotland	10	8	0	1	1	1
288	Jakkals Keevy			0					
289	Chum Ochse	8 December 1951	Ireland	7	9	3	0	0	0
290	Cowboy Saunders			0					
291	Paul Johnstone	24 November 1951	Scotland	9	11	2	1	1	0
292	Des Sinclair	6 August 1955	Britain	4	0	0	0	0	0
293	Basie Vivier	26 May 1956	Australia	5	11	0	4	1	0
294	Dennis Fry			0					
295	Hansie Oelofse	22 August 1953	Australia	4	6	2	0	0	0
296	Piet Wessels			0					
297	Willem Delport	24 November 1951	Scotland	9	6	2	0	0	0
298	Jaap Bekker	5 January 1952	England	15	3	1	0	0	0
299	Franz van der Ryst			0					
300	Ernst Dinkelmann	24 November 1951	Scotland	6	6	2	0	0	0
301	Jan Pickard	19 September 1953	Australia	4	0	0	0	0	0
302	Gert Dannhauser			0					
303	Stephen Fry	24 November 1951	Scotland	13	0	0	0	0	0
304	Basie van Wyk	24 November 1951	Scotland	10	18	6	0	0	0
305	Ben Myburgh			0					
306	Ian Kirkpatrick	5 September 1953	Australia	13	0	0	0	0	0
307	Steve Hoffman	19 September 1953	Australia	1	0	0	0	0	0
308	Dolf Bekker	19 September 1953	Australia	2	3	1	0	0	0
309	Daantjie Rossouw	19 September 1953	Australia	2	3	1	0	0	0
310	Natie Rens	19 September 1953	Australia	2	19	0	5	2	1
311	Harry Walker	19 September 1953	Australia	4	0	0	0	0	0
312	Sias Swart	6 August 1955	Britain	1	3	1	0	0	0
313	Theuns Briers	6 August 1955	Britain	7	15	5	0	0	0
314	Tom van Vollenhoven	6 August 1955	Britain	7	15	4	0	0	1
315	Clive Ulyate	6 August 1955	Britain	7	6	1	0	0	1
316	Tommy Gentles	6 August 1955	Britain	6	0	0	0	0	0
317	Amos du Plooy	6 August 1955	Britain	1	0	0	0	0	0
318	Colin Kroon	6 August 1955	Britain	1	0	0	0	0	0
319	Johan Claassen	6 August 1955	Britain	28	10	2	2	0	0
320	Daan Retief	6 August 1955	Britain	9	12	4	0	0	0
321	Roy Dryburgh	20 August 1955	Britain	8	28	3	5	3	0
322	Wilf Rosenberg	20 August 1955	Britain	5	6	2	0	0	0
323	Bertus van der Merwe	20 August 1955	Britain	12	0	0	0	0	0
324	Dawie Ackermann	20 August 1955	Britain	8	3	1	0	0	0
325	Popeye Strydom	3 September 1955	Britain	6	0	0	0	0	0
326	Butch Lochner	3 September 1955	Britain	9	6	2	0	0	0
327	Jan du Preez	14 July 1956	New Zealand	1	0	0	0	0	0
328	Pat Montini	26 May 1956	Australia	2	0	0	0	0	0
329	Jeremy Nel	26 May 1956	Australia	8	3	1	0	0	0
330	Peewee Howe	14 July 1956	New Zealand	2	3	1	0	0	0
331	Brian Pfaff	26 May 1956	Australia	1	0	0	0	0	0
332	Piet du Toit	26 July 1958	France	14	0	0	0	0	0
333	Melt Hanekom			0					
334	Chris de Nysschen			0					
335	Chris de Wilzem			0					
336	James Starke	1 September 1956	New Zealand	1	0	0	0	0	0
337	Mickey Gerber	26 July 1958	France	3	8	0	4	0	0
338	Jan Prinsloo	26 July 1958	France	2	0	0	0	0	0
339	Lofty Fourie	26 July 1958	France	2	3	1	0	0	0
340	Hugo van Zyl	26 July 1958	France	17	12	4	0	0	0
341	Martin Pelser	26 July 1958	France	11	6	2	0	0	0
342	Johan Steenekamp	26 July 1958	France	1	0	0	0	0	0
343	Alan Skene	16 August 1958	France	1	0	0	0	0	0
344	Joe Kaminer	16 August 1958	France	1	0	0	0	0	0
345	Abie Malan	16 August 1958	France	18	3	1	0	0	0
346	Louis Schmidt	16 August 1958	France	2	0	0	0	0	0
347	Jannie Engelbrecht	30 April 1960	Scotland	33	24	8	0	0	0
348	John Gainsford	30 April 1960	Scotland	33	24	8	0	0	0
349	Robert Twigge	30 April 1960	Scotland	1	0	0	0	0	0
350	Dave Stewart	30 April 1960	Scotland	11	9	1	0	2	0
351	Mannetjies Gericke	30 April 1960	Scotland	1	3	1	0	0	0
352	Dougie Holton	30 April 1960	Scotland	1	0	0	0	0	0
353	Martiens Bekker	30 April 1960	Scotland	1	0	0	0	0	0
354	Des van Jaarsveldt	30 April 1960	Scotland	1	3	1	0	0	0
355	Peter Allen	30 April 1960	Scotland	1	0	0	0	0	0
356	Doug Hopwood	30 April 1960	Scotland	22	15	5	0	0	0
357	Hennie van Zyl	25 June 1960	New Zealand	10	18	6	0	0	0
358	Mike Antelme	25 June 1960	New Zealand	5	0	0	0	0	0
359	Keith Oxlee	25 June 1960	New Zealand	19	88	5	14	14	1
360	Dick Lockyear	25 June 1960	New Zealand	6	20	0	4	4	0
361	Avril Malan	25 June 1960	New Zealand	16	0	0	0	0	0
362	Lofty Nel	25 June 1960	New Zealand	11	0	0	0	0	0
363	Lionel Wilson	13 August 1960	New Zealand	27	6	0	0	0	2
364	Fanie Kuhn	13 August 1960	New Zealand	19	0	0	0	0	0
365	Stompie van der Merwe	27 August 1960	New Zealand	5	0	0	0	0	0
366	Giepie Wentzel			0					
367	Mannetjies Roux	3 December 1960	Wales	27	18	6	0	0	0
368	Bennie van Niekerk			0					
369	Charlie Nimb	13 May 1961	Ireland	1	9	0	3	1	0
370	Piet Uys	3 December 1960	Wales	12	0	0	0	0	0
371	Mof Myburgh	23 June 1962	Britain	18	0	0	0	0	0
372	Ronnie Hill	3 December 1960	Wales	7	0	0	0	0	0
373	Piet van Zyl	13 May 1961	Ireland	1	0	0	0	0	0
374	Hannes Botha	21 July 1962	Britain	3	0	0	0	0	0
375	Frik du Preez	7 January 1961	England	38	11	1	1	2	0
376	Attie Baard	17 December 1960	Ireland	1	0	0	0	0	0
377	Bobby Johns			0					
378	Ben-Piet van Zyl	13 May 1961	Ireland	1	6	2	0	0	0
379	Colin Greenwood	13 May 1961	Ireland	1	6	2	0	0	0
380	Ormond Taylor	23 June 1962	Britain	1	0	0	0	0	0
381	Wang Wyness	23 June 1962	Britain	5	3	1	0	0	0
382	Dawie de Villiers	21 July 1962	Britain	25	9	3	0	0	0
383	Chris Bezuidenhout	21 July 1962	Britain	3	0	0	0	0	0
384	Gert Cilliers	13 July 1963	Australia	3	3	1	0	0	0
385	Trix Truter	13 July 1963	Australia	3	3	1	0	0	0
386	Dick Putter	13 July 1963	Australia	3	0	0	0	0	0
387	Tommy Bedford	13 July 1963	Australia	25	3	1	0	0	0
388	Norman Riley	24 August 1963	Australia	1	0	0	0	0	0
389	Nelie Smith	24 August 1963	Australia	7	12	1	0	3	0
390	Hannes Marais	24 August 1963	Australia	35	3	1	0	0	0
391	Haas Schoeman	24 August 1963	Australia	7	0	0	0	0	0
392	Poens Prinsloo	24 August 1963	Australia	1	0	0	0	0	0
393	Corra Dirksen	7 September 1963	Australia	10	9	3	0	0	0
394	Tiny Naudé	7 September 1963	Australia	14	47	2	4	11	0
395	Gawie Carelse	23 May 1964	Wales	14	0	0	0	0	0
396	Mike Lawless	25 July 1964	France	4	0	0	0	0	0
397	Don Walton	25 July 1964	France	8	0	0	0	0	0
398	Wynand Mans	10 April 1965	Ireland	2	5	1	1	0	0
399	Jannie Barnard	17 April 1965	Scotland	5	0	0	0	0	0
400	Dirk de Vos	17 April 1965	Scotland	3	0	0	0	0	0
401	Tiny Neethling	15 July 1967	France	8	0	0	0	0	0
402	John Wessels			0					
403	Snowy Suter	10 April 1965	Ireland	2	0	0	0	0	0
404	Faan Conradie			0					
405	Boet Mulder			0					
406	Kerneels Cronjé			0					
407	Gertjie Brynard	19 June 1965	Australia	7	6	2	0	0	0
408	Syd Nomis	12 August 1967	France	25	18	6	0	0	0
409	Andy MacDonald	19 June 1965	Australia	5	0	0	0	0	0
410	Sakkie van Zyl	31 July 1965	New Zealand	4	0	0	0	0	0
411	Hambly Parker	19 June 1965	Australia	2	0	0	0	0	0
412	Piet Botha	19 June 1965	Australia	2	0	0	0	0	0
413	Piet Goosen	21 August 1965	New Zealand	1	0	0	0	0	0
414	Andrew Janson			0					
415	Jan Ellis	31 July 1965	New Zealand	38	21	7	0	0	0
416	Louis Slabber			0					
417	Eben Olivier	15 July 1967	France	16	15	5	0	0	0
418	HO de Villiers	15 July 1967	France	14	26	0	7	4	0
419	Piet Visagie	15 July 1967	France	25	130	6	20	19	5
420	Gert Kotzé	15 July 1967	France	4	0	0	0	0	0
421	Gys Pitzer	15 July 1967	France	12	0	0	0	0	0
422	Piet Greyling	15 July 1967	France	25	15	5	0	0	0
423	Albie de Waal	15 July 1967	France	4	0	0	0	0	0
424	Rodney Gould	8 June 1968	Britain	4	3	0	0	0	1
425	Thys Lourens	22 June 1968	Britain	3	3	1	0	0	0
426	Tonie Roux	6 December 1969	Scotland	7	0	0	0	0	0
427	Alan Menter			0					
428	Gert Muller	6 September 1969	Australia	14	12	4	0	0	0
429	André de Wet	6 September 1969	Australia	3	0	0	0	0	0
430	Paul Durand			0					
431	Renier Grobler			0					
432	Andy van der Watt	6 December 1969	Scotland	3	0	0	0	0	0
433	Johann van der Merwe	24 January 1970	Wales	1	0	0	0	0	0
434	Johan van der Schyff			0					
435	Ronnie Potgieter			0					
436	Martin Janse van Rensburg			0					
437	Piet van Deventer			0					
438	Albie Bates	20 December 1969	England	4	0	0	0	0	0
439	Mike Jennings			0					
440	Sakkie de Klerk	20 December 1969	England	3	0	0	0	0	0
441	Charlie Cockrell	6 December 1969	Scotland	3	0	0	0	0	0
442	Robbie Barnard	8 August 1970	New Zealand	1	0	0	0	0	0
443	Ian McCallum	25 July 1970	New Zealand	11	62	0	10	14	0
444	Joggie Jansen	25 July 1970	New Zealand	10	3	1	0	0	0
445	Piston van Wyk	25 July 1970	New Zealand	15	0	0	0	0	0
446	Johan Spies	25 July 1970	New Zealand	4	0	0	0	0	0
447	Peter Cronjé	12 June 1971	France	7	10	3	0	0	0
448	Joggie Viljoen	12 June 1971	France	6	6	2	0	0	0
449	Sakkie Sauermann	12 June 1971	France	5	0	0	0	0	0
450	John Williams	12 June 1971	France	13	0	0	0	0	0
451	Hannes Viljoen	17 July 1971	Australia	3	6	2	0	0	0
452	Peter Swanson			0					
453	Dawie Snyman	3 June 1972	England	10	24	1	1	4	2
454	Martiens Louw	31 July 1971	Australia	2	0	0	0	0	0
455	Morné du Plessis	17 July 1971	Australia	22	12	3	0	0	0
456	Ray Carlson	3 June 1972	England	1	0	0	0	0	0
457	Niek Bezuidenhout	3 June 1972	England	9	0	0	0	0	0
458	Piet du Plessis	3 June 1972	England	1	0	0	0	0	0
459	Peter Whipp	8 June 1974	Britain	8	4	1	0	0	0
460	Johan Oosthuizen	8 June 1974	Britain	9	8	2	0	0	0
461	Chris Pope	8 June 1974	Britain	9	4	1	0	0	0
462	Roy McCallum	8 June 1974	Britain	1	0	0	0	0	0
463	Boland Coetzee	8 June 1974	Britain	6	0	0	0	0	0
464	Kevin de Klerk	8 June 1974	Britain	13	0	0	0	0	0
465	Gerrie Germishuys	22 June 1974	Britain	20	48	12	0	0	0
466	Jackie Snyman	22 June 1974	Britain	3	18	0	0	6	0
467	Gerald Bosch	22 June 1974	Britain	9	89	0	7	23	2
468	Paul Bayvel	22 June 1974	Britain	10	0	0	0	0	0
469	Dave Frederickson	22 June 1974	Britain	3	0	0	0	0	0
470	Dugald MacDonald	22 June 1974	Britain	1	0	0	0	0	0
471	Leon Vogel	22 June 1974	Britain	1	0	0	0	0	0
472	Jan Schlebusch	13 July 1974	Britain	3	0	0	0	0	0
473	Gerrie Sonnekus	13 July 1974	Britain	3	4	1	0	0	0
474	Moaner van Heerden	13 July 1974	Britain	17	4	1	0	0	0
475	Johan de Bruyn	13 July 1974	Britain	1	0	0	0	0	0
476	Polla Fourie	13 July 1974	Britain	1	0	0	0	0	0
477	Klippies Kritzinger	13 July 1974	Britain	7	4	1	0	0	0
478	Kleintjie Grobler	27 July 1974	Britain	3	4	1	0	0	0
479	Rampie Stander	27 July 1974	Britain	5	0	0	0	0	0
480	Ian Robertson	23 November 1974	France	5	3	0	0	0	1
481	Carel Fourie	23 November 1974	France	4	10	1	0	2	0
482	Willem Stapelberg	23 November 1974	France	2	8	2	0	0	0
483	André van Staden			0					
484	Derek van den Berg	21 June 1975	France	4	0	0	0	0	0
485	André Bestbier	30 November 1974	France	1	0	0	0	0	0
486	Robert Cockrell	23 November 1974	France	11	4	1	0	0	0
487	Edrich Krantz	24 July 1976	New Zealand	2	4	1	0	0	0
488	De Wet Ras	24 July 1976	New Zealand	2	0	0	0	0	0
489	Theuns Stofberg	14 August 1976	New Zealand	21	24	6	0	0	0
490	Johan Strauss	4 September 1976	New Zealand	3	0	0	0	0	0
491	Christo Wagenaar	27 August 1977	World Invitation	1	0	0	0	0	0
492	Dirk Froneman	27 August 1977	World Invitation	1	0	0	0	0	0
493	Hermanus Potgieter	27 August 1977	World Invitation	1	4	1	0	0	0
494	Robbie Blair	27 August 1977	World Invitation	1	21	0	3	5	0
495	Barry Wolmarans	27 August 1977	World Invitation	1	4	1	0	0	0
496	Daan du Plessis	27 August 1977	World Invitation	2	0	0	0	0	0
497	Piet Veldsman	27 August 1977	World Invitation	1	0	0	0	0	0
498	Louis Moolman	27 August 1977	World Invitation	24	0	0	0	0	0
499	Pierre Edwards	26 April 1980	South America	2	0	0	0	0	0
500	Willie du Plessis	26 April 1980	South America	14	12	3	0	0	0
501	Ray Mordt	26 April 1980	South America	18	48	12	0	0	0
502	Naas Botha	26 April 1980	South America	28	312	2	50	51	17
503	Tommy du Plessis	26 April 1980	South America	2	4	1	0	0	0
504	Richard Prentis	26 April 1980	South America	11	0	0	0	0	0
505	Rob Louw	26 April 1980	South America	19	20	5	0	0	0
506	Gysie Pienaar	3 May 1980	South America	13	14	2	0	2	0
507	David Smith	31 May 1980	Britain	4	0	0	0	0	0
508	Divan Serfontein	31 May 1980	Britain	19	12	3	0	0	0
509	Willie Kahts	31 May 1980	Britain	11	4	1	0	0	0
510	Martiens le Roux	31 May 1980	Britain	8	0	0	0	0	0
511	Thys Burger	14 June 1980	Britain	3	8	2	0	0	0
512	Ewoud Malan	28 June 1980	Britain	2	0	0	0	0	0
513	Tim Cocks			0					
514	Danie Gerber	18 October 1980	South America	24	82	19	1	0	0
515	Errol Tobias	30 May 1981	Ireland	6	22	1	3	4	0
516	Hempies du Toit	15 August 1981	New Zealand	5	0	0	0	0	0
517	Div Visser	29 August 1981	New Zealand	2	0	0	0	0	0
518	Eben Jansen	15 August 1981	New Zealand	1	0	0	0	0	0
519	Wynand Claassen	30 May 1981	Ireland	7	0	0	0	0	0
520	Ockie Oosthuizen	30 May 1981	Ireland	9	4	1	0	0	0
521	Johan Heunis	12 September 1981	New Zealand	14	41	2	6	7	0
522	Darius Botha	15 August 1981	New Zealand	1	0	0	0	0	0
523	Carel du Plessis	27 March 1982	South America	12	16	4	0	0	0
524	Colin Beck	29 August 1981	New Zealand	3	4	1	0	0	0
525	Henning van Aswegen	15 August 1981	New Zealand	2	0	0	0	0	0
526	Flippie van der Merwe	29 August 1981	New Zealand	6	0	0	0	0	0
527	Hennie Bekker	15 August 1981	New Zealand	2	4	1	0	0	0
528	Burger Geldenhuys	29 August 1981	New Zealand	7	4	1	0	0	0
529	Johan Marais			0					
530	Gawie Visagie			0					
531	Shaun Povey			0					
532	John Villet	2 June 1984	England	2	0	0	0	0	0
533	Avril Williams	2 June 1984	England	2	0	0	0	0	0
534	Chris Rogers	2 June 1984	England	4	0	0	0	0	0
535	Schalk Burger	2 June 1984	England	6	0	0	0	0	0
536	Rudi Visagie	2 June 1984	England	5	0	0	0	0	0
537	Michael du Plessis	20 October 1984	South America	8	7	1	0	0	1
538	Anton Barnard	20 October 1984	South America	4	0	0	0	0	0
539	Attie Strauss	20 October 1984	South America	2	0	0	0	0	0
540	Kulu Ferreira	20 October 1984	South America	2	4	1	0	0	0
541	Nick Mallett	20 October 1984	South America	2	4	1	0	0	0
542	Jaco Reinach	10 May 1986	NZ Cavaliers	4	8	2	0	0	0
543	Christo Ferreira	10 May 1986	NZ Cavaliers	2	0	0	0	0	0
544	Uli Schmidt	10 May 1986	NZ Cavaliers	17	9	2	0	0	0
545	Wahl Bartmann	10 May 1986	NZ Cavaliers	8	0	0	0	0	0
546	Gert Smal	10 May 1986	NZ Cavaliers	6	4	1	0	0	0
547	Jannie Breedt	10 May 1986	NZ Cavaliers	8	0	0	0	0	0
548	Garth Wright	24 May 1986	NZ Cavaliers	7	4	1	0	0	0
549	Frans Erasmus	24 May 1986	NZ Cavaliers	3	0	0	0	0	0
550	Piet Kruger	24 May 1986	NZ Cavaliers	2	0	0	0	0	0
551	Helgard Müller	31 May 1986	NZ Cavaliers	2	0	0	0	0	0
552	Kobus Burger	26 August 1989	World Invitation	2	0	0	0	0	0
553	Faffa Knoetze	26 August 1989	World Invitation	2	4	1	0	0	0
554	Heinrich Rodgers	26 August 1989	World Invitation	5	0	0	0	0	0
555	Niel Hugo	26 August 1989	World Invitation	2	0	0	0	0	0
556	Adolf Malan	26 August 1989	World Invitation	7	0	0	0	0	0
557	André Joubert	26 August 1989	World Invitation	34	115	10	7	17	0
558	Theo Jansen van Rensburg	15 August 1992	New Zealand	7	40	0	2	12	0
559	Pieter Hendriks	15 August 1992	New Zealand	14	10	2	0	0	0
560	Pieter Muller	15 August 1992	New Zealand	33	15	3	0	0	0
561	James Small	15 August 1992	New Zealand	47	100	20	0	0	0
562	Robert du Preez	15 August 1992	New Zealand	7	0	0	0	0	0
563	Lood Muller	15 August 1992	New Zealand	2	0	0	0	0	0
564	Adri Geldenhuys	15 August 1992	New Zealand	4	0	0	0	0	0
565	Ian MacDonald	15 August 1992	New Zealand	6	0	0	0	0	0
566	Johan Styger	15 August 1992	New Zealand	7	0	0	0	0	0
567	Heinrich Füls	15 August 1992	New Zealand	8	0	0	0	0	0
568	Drikus Hattingh	22 August 1992	Australia	5	0	0	0	0	0
569	Hugh Reece-Edwards	17 October 1992	France	3	0	0	0	0	0
570	Jacques Olivier	17 October 1992	France	17	15	3	0	0	0
571	Deon Oosthuysen			0					
572	Hennie le Roux	26 June 1993	France	27	34	4	1	4	0
573	Harry Roberts			0					
574	Keith Andrews	14 November 1992	England	9	0	0	0	0	0
575	Willie Hills	17 October 1992	France	6	0	0	0	0	0
576	Steve Atherton	6 November 1993	Argentina	8	0	0	0	0	0
577	Piet Pretorius			0					
578	Botha Rossouw			0					
579	Tiaan Strauss	17 October 1992	France	15	20	4	0	0	0
580	Adriaan Richter	17 October 1992	France	10	20	4	0	0	0
581	Andries Truscott			0					
582	Phillip Schutte	19 November 1994	Scotland	2	0	0	0	0	0
583	FC Smit	14 November 1992	England	1	0	0	0	0	0
584	Francois Pienaar	26 June 1993	France	29	15	3	0	0	0
585	Kobus Wiese	26 June 1993	France	18	5	1	0	0	0
586	Hannes Strydom	3 July 1993	France	21	5	1	0	0	0
587	Nico Wegner	3 July 1993	France	4	0	0	0	0	0
588	Deon Lotter	3 July 1993	France	3	0	0	0	0	0
589	Chester Williams	13 November 1993	Argentina	27	70	14	0	0	0
590	Henry Honiball	21 August 1993	Australia	35	156	1	38	25	0
591	Tinus Linee			0					
592	Joel Stransky	31 July 1993	Australia	22	240	6	30	47	3
593	Joost van der Westhuizen	6 November 1993	Argentina	89	190	38	0	0	0
594	John Allan	31 July 1993	Australia	13	0	0	0	0	0
595	Balie Swart	31 July 1993	Australia	16	0	0	0	0	0
596	Ruben Kruger	6 November 1993	Argentina	36	35	7	0	0	0
597	Chris Dirks			0					
598	Hentie Martens			0					
599	Guy Kebble	6 November 1993	Argentina	4	0	0	0	0	0
600	Ollie le Roux	4 June 1994	England	54	5	1	0	0	0
601	Naka Drotské	13 November 1993	Argentina	26	15	3	0	0	0
602	Mark Andrews	11 June 1994	England	77	60	12	0	0	0
603	Gary Teichmann	2 September 1995	Wales	42	30	6	0	0	0
604	Gavin Johnson	13 November 1993	Argentina	7	86	5	14	11	0
605	Brendan Venter	4 June 1994	England	17	10	2	0	0	0
606	Fritz van Heerden	4 June 1994	England	14	5	1	0	0	0
607	Johan Roux	11 June 1994	England	12	10	2	0	0	0
608	Johan le Roux	11 June 1994	England	3	0	0	0	0	0
609	Cabous van der Westhuizen			0					
610	Chris Badenhorst	15 October 1994	Argentina	2	10	2	0	0	0
611	Jannie Claassens			0					
612	FA Meiring			0					
613	Lance Sherrell			0					
614	James Dalton	8 October 1994	Argentina	43	25	5	0	0	0
615	Krynauw Otto	30 May 1995	Romania	38	5	1	0	0	0
616	Rudolf Straeuli	9 July 1994	New Zealand	10	20	4	0	0	0
617	Japie Mulder	23 July 1994	New Zealand	34	30	6	0	0	0
618	Christiaan Scholtz	8 October 1994	Argentina	4	0	0	0	0	0
619	Os du Randt	8 October 1994	Argentina	80	25	5	0	0	0
620	Tommie Laubscher	8 October 1994	Argentina	6	0	0	0	0	0
621	Elandré van der Bergh	15 October 1994	Argentina	1	0	0	0	0	0
622	Kevin Putt			0					
623	Ian Hattingh			0					
624	Chris Rossouw	13 April 1995	Samoa	9	10	2	0	0	0
625	Mornay Visser	13 April 1995	Samoa	1	0	0	0	0	0
626	Robby Brink	30 May 1995	Romania	2	0	0	0	0	0
627	Marius Hurter	30 May 1995	Romania	13	0	0	0	0	0
628	Garry Pagel	25 May 1995	Australia	5	0	0	0	0	0
629	Toks van der Linde	12 November 1995	Italy	7	0	0	0	0	0
630	Justin Swart	2 July 1996	Fiji	10	5	1	0	0	0
631	Danie van Schalkwyk	2 July 1996	Fiji	8	10	2	0	0	0
632	Johan Ackermann	2 July 1996	Fiji	13	0	0	0	0	0
633	Dawie Theron	3 August 1996	Australia	13	0	0	0	0	0
634	André Venter	17 August 1996	New Zealand	66	45	9	0	0	0
635	Henry Tromp	17 August 1996	New Zealand	4	0	0	0	0	0
636	André Snyman	17 August 1996	New Zealand	38	50	10	0	0	0
637	Vlok Cilliers	17 August 1996	New Zealand	1	0	0	0	0	0
638	Wayne Fyvie	24 August 1996	New Zealand	3	0	0	0	0	0
639	Schutte Bekker	23 August 1997	Australia	1	0	0	0	0	0
640	Russell Bennett	10 June 1997	Tonga	6	10	2	0	0	0
641	Joe Gillingham			0					
642	Dick Muir	8 November 1997	Italy	5	10	2	0	0	0
643	Franco Smith	6 December 1997	Scotland	9	23	2	2	3	0
644	Joggie Viljoen			0					
645	Adrian Garvey	9 November 1996	Argentina	28	20	4	0	0	0
646	Theo Oosthuizen			0					
647	Breyton Paulse	12 June 1999	Italy	64	130	26	0	0	0
648	Jeremy Thomson			0					
649	Rassie Erasmus	5 July 1997	Britain	36	35	7	0	0	0
650	Edrich Lubbe	10 June 1997	Tonga	2	17	0	7	1	0
651	Percy Montgomery	28 June 1997	Britain	102	893	25	153	148	6
652	Pieter Rossouw	28 June 1997	Britain	43	105	21	0	0	0
653	Jannie de Beer	5 July 1997	Britain	13	181	2	33	27	8
654	Werner Swanepoel	5 July 1997	Britain	20	30	6	0	0	0
655	Warren Brosnihan	23 August 1997	Australia	6	5	1	0	0	0
656	Braam Els	23 August 1997	Australia	1	0	0	0	0	0
657	McNeil Hendricks	20 June 1998	Ireland	2	5	1	0	0	0
658	Andrew Aitken	22 November 1997	France	7	0	0	0	0	0
659	Bobby Skinstad	29 November 1997	England	42	55	11	0	0	0
660	Philip Smit			0					
661	Wium Basson			0					
662	Thinus Delport	10 June 2000	Canada	18	15	3	0	0	0
663	Willie Meyer	6 December 1997	Scotland	26	5	1	0	0	0
664	Boeta Wessels			0					
665	Dan van Zyl	2 December 2000	England	1	0	0	0	0	0
666	Dale Santon	12 July 2003	Australia	4	0	0	0	0	0
667	Gaffie du Toit	13 June 1998	Ireland	14	108	5	25	11	0
668	Stefan Terblanche	13 June 1998	Ireland	37	95	19	0	0	0
669	Robbi Kempson	20 June 1998	Ireland	37	5	1	0	0	0
670	Selborne Boome	12 June 1999	Italy	20	5	1	0	0	0
671	Braam van Straaten	19 June 1999	Italy	21	221	2	23	55	0
672	Lourens Venter			0					
673	Chad Alcock			0					
674	Robbie Fleck	12 June 1999	Italy	31	50	10	0	0	0
675	Deon Kayser	19 June 1999	Italy	13	25	5	0	0	0
676	Corné Krige	19 June 1999	Italy	39	10	2	0	0	0
677	Robert Markram			0					
678	Christian Stewart	21 November 1998	Scotland	3	0	0	0	0	0
679	Owen Nkumane			0					
680	Johnny Trytsman			0					
681	André Vos	12 June 1999	Italy	33	25	5	0	0	0
682	Brent Moyle			0					
683	Cobus Visagie	12 June 1999	Italy	29	0	0	0	0	0
684	Albert van den Berg	12 June 1999	Italy	51	20	4	0	0	0
685	Charl Marais	12 June 1999	Italy	12	5	1	0	0	0
686	Dave von Hoesslin	12 June 1999	Italy	5	10	2	0	0	0
687	Kaya Malotana	10 October 1999	Spain	1	0	0	0	0	0
688	Anton Leonard	17 July 1999	Australia	2	5	1	0	0	0
689	Wayne Julies	10 October 1999	Spain	11	10	2	0	0	0
690	De Wet Barry	10 June 2000	Canada	39	15	3	0	0	0
691	John Smit	10 June 2000	Canada	111	40	8	0	0	0
692	Grant Esterhuizen	22 July 2000	New Zealand	7	0	0	0	0	0
693	Louis Koen	8 July 2000	Australia	15	145	0	23	31	2
694	Jannes Labuschagne	22 July 2000	New Zealand	11	0	0	0	0	0
695	AJ Venter	26 November 2000	Wales	25	0	0	0	0	0
696	Jaco van der Westhuyzen	19 August 2000	New Zealand	32	51	5	7	1	3
697	Ricardo Loubscher	8 June 2002	Wales	4	0	0	0	0	0
698	Gavin Passens			0					
699	Chris Rossouw			0					
700	Craig Davidson	15 June 2002	Wales	5	10	2	0	0	0
701	Delarey du Preez	6 July 2002	Samoa	2	5	1	0	0	0
702	Lawrence Sephaka	1 December 2001	USA	24	0	0	0	0	0
703	Eric van der Merwe			0					
704	Hottie Louw	15 June 2002	Wales	3	0	0	0	0	0
705	Victor Matfield	30 June 2001	Italy	127	35	7	0	0	0
706	Quinton Davids	15 June 2002	Wales	9	0	0	0	0	0
707	Johan Wasserman			0					
708	Thando Manana			0					
709	Hendrik Gerber	7 June 2003	Scotland	2	0	0	0	0	0
710	Etienne Fynn	16 June 2001	France	2	0	0	0	0	0
711	Marius Joubert	21 July 2001	New Zealand	30	45	9	0	0	0
712	Adri Badenhorst			0					
713	Pieter Dixon			0					
714	Dean Hall	16 June 2001	France	13	20	4	0	0	0
715	Butch James	16 June 2001	France	42	159	3	27	29	1
716	Conrad Jantjes	30 June 2001	Italy	24	22	4	1	0	0
717	Neil de Kock	30 June 2001	Italy	10	10	2	0	0	0
718	Lukas van Biljon	30 June 2001	Italy	13	5	1	0	0	0
719	Joe van Niekerk	21 July 2001	New Zealand	52	50	10	0	0	0
720	Trevor Halstead	10 November 2001	France	6	15	3	0	0	0
721	Adrian Jacobs	17 November 2001	Italy	34	35	7	0	0	0
722	Deon de Kock	17 November 2001	Italy	2	0	0	0	0	0
723	André Pretorius	8 June 2002	Wales	31	171	2	31	25	8
724	Bolla Conradie	8 June 2002	Wales	18	13	2	0	0	1
725	Warren Britz	8 June 2002	Wales	1	0	0	0	0	
726	Daan Human	8 June 2002	Wales	4	0	0	0	0	0
727	Brent Russell	8 June 2002	Wales	23	40	8	0	0	0
728	Faan Rautenbach	8 June 2002	Wales	14	5	1	0	0	0
729	Werner Greeff	29 June 2002	Argentina	11	31	4	4	0	1
730	Danie Coetzee	6 July 2002	Samoa	15	5	1	0	0	0
731	Shaun Sowerby	6 July 2002	Samoa	1	0	0	0	0	0
732	Hendro Scholtz	27 July 2002	Australia	5	5	1	0	0	0
733	Bakkies Botha	9 November 2002	France	85	35	7	0	0	0
734	Deon Carstens	16 November 2002	Scotland	9	0	0	0	0	0
735	Jean de Villiers	9 November 2002	France	109	135	27	0	0	0
736	Friedrich Lombard	16 November 2002	Scotland	2	0	0	0	0	0
737	Wessel Roux	9 November 2002	France	3	0	0	0	0	0
738	Pierre Uys	16 November 2002	Scotland	1	0	0	0	0	0
739	Pedrie Wannenburg	9 November 2002	France	20	15	3	0	0	0
740	Marco Wentzel	9 November 2002	France	2	0	0	0	0	0
741	CJ van der Linde	16 November 2002	Scotland	73	20	4	0	0	0
742	Norman Jordaan	23 November 2002	England	1	0	0	0	0	0
743	Ashwin Willemse	7 June 2003	Scotland	19	20	4	0	0	0
744	Wikus van Heerden	7 June 2003	Scotland	14	5	1	0	0	0
745	Richard Bands	7 June 2003	Scotland	11	10	2	0	0	0
746	Juan Smith	7 June 2003	Scotland	70	60	12	0	0	0
747	Gcobani Bobo	14 June 2003	Scotland	6	0	0	0	0	0
748	Jorrie Muller	2 August 2003	Australia	6	5	1	0	0	0
749	Gus Theron			0					
750	Geo Cronjé	9 August 2003	New Zealand	3	0	0	0	0	0
751	Christo Bezuidenhout	9 August 2003	New Zealand	4	0	0	0	0	0
752	Jaque Fourie	11 October 2003	Uruguay	72	160	32	0	0	0
753	Derick Hougaard	11 October 2003	Uruguay	8	69	2	13	10	1
754	Schalk Burger	24 October 2003	Georgia	86	80	16	0	0	0
755	Danie Rossouw	11 October 2003	Uruguay	63	50	10	0	0	0
756	Henno Mentz	12 June 2004	Ireland	2	0	0	0	0	0
757	Fourie du Preez	12 June 2004	Ireland	76	80	16	0	0	0
758	Jacques Cronjé	12 June 2004	Ireland	32	20	4	0	0	0
759	Eddie Andrews	12 June 2004	Ireland	23	0	0	0	0	0
760	Gerrie Britz	12 June 2004	Ireland	13	0	0	0	0	0
761	Hanyani Shimange	26 June 2004	Wales	9	0	0	0	0	0
762	Tim Dlulane	6 November 2004	Wales	1	0	0	0	0	0
763	Solly Tyibilika	27 November 2004	Scotland	8	15	3	0	0	0
764	Gurthrö Steenkamp	27 November 2004	Scotland	53	30	6	0	0	0
765	Michael Claassens	6 November 2004	Wales	8	0	0	0	0	0
766	Bryan Habana	20 November 2004	England	124	335	67	0	0	0
767	Jongi Nokwe	9 August 2008	Argentina	4	25	5	0	0	0
768	Tonderai Chavhanga	11 June 2005	Uruguay	4	30	6	0	0	0
769	Ricky Januarie	11 June 2005	Uruguay	47	25	5	0	0	0
770	Gary Botha	30 July 2005	Australia	12	0	0	0	0	0
771	Meyer Bosman	19 November 2005	Wales	3	7	0	2	1	0
772	Wynand Olivier	10 June 2006	Scotland	38	5	1	0	0	0
773	Johann Muller	10 June 2006	Scotland	24	0	0	0	0	0
774	Akona Ndungane	15 July 2006	Australia	11	5	1	0	0	0
775	JP Pietersen	9 September 2006	Australia	70	120	24	0	0	0
776	Chiliboy Ralepelle	26 August 2006	New Zealand	25	5	1	0	0	0
777	Pierre Spies	15 July 2006	Australia	53	35	7	0	0	0
778	BJ Botha	26 August 2006	New Zealand	25	5	1	0	0	0
779	Ruan Pienaar	26 August 2006	New Zealand	88	135	8	22	17	0
780	Bevin Fortuin	11 November 2006	Ireland	2	0	0	0	0	0
781	Hilton Lobberts	18 November 2006	England	2	0	0	0	0	0
782	Jaco Pretorius	11 November 2006	Ireland	2	0	0	0	0	0
783	François Steyn	11 November 2006	Ireland	78	165	11	13	25	3
784	Kabamba Floors	25 November 2006	England	1	0	0	0	0	0
785	Waylon Murray	9 June 2007	Samoa	3	0	0	0	0	0
786	Luke Watson	9 June 2007	Samoa	10	0	0	0	0	0
787	Bismarck du Plessis	7 July 2007	Australia	79	55	11	0	0	0
788	Jannie du Plessis	7 July 2007	Australia	70	5	1	0	0	0
789	Peter Grant	7 July 2007	Australia	5	0	0	0	0	0
790	Heinke van der Merwe	24 November 2007	Wales	5	0	0	0	0	0
791	Ryan Kankowski	24 November 2007	Wales	20	5	1	0	0	0
792	Wian du Preez	21 November 2009	Italy	1	0	0	0	0	0
793	Barend Pieterse			0	0	0	0	0	0
794	Tiaan Liebenberg	1 December 2007	Barbarians	5	0	0	0	0	0
795	Andries Bekker	7 June 2008	Wales	29	5	1	0	0	0
796	Brian Mujati	7 June 2008	Wales	12	0	0	0	0	0
797	Tendai Mtawarira	14 June 2008	Wales	117	10	2	0	0	0
798	Odwa Ndungane	21 June 2008	Italy	9	10	2	0	0	0
799	Schalk Brits	21 June 2008	Italy	15	15	3	0	0	0
800	Adriaan Strauss	19 July 2008	Australia	66	30	6	0	0	0
801	Heinrich Brüssow	22 November 2008	England	23	5	1	0	0	0
802	Earl Rose			0	0	0	0	0	0
803	Morné Steyn	20 June 2009	Britain	68	742	8	102	156	10
804	Zane Kirchner	4 July 2009	Britain	31	25	5	0	0	0
805	Heini Adams			0	0	0	0	0	0
806	Juan de Jongh	5 June 2010	Wales	19	20	4	0	0	0
807	Francois Hougaard	21 November 2009	Italy	46	25	5	0	0	0
808	Riaan Viljoen			0	0	0	0	0	0
809	Alistair Hargreaves	5 June 2010	Wales	4	0	0	0	0	0
810	Ashley Johnson	23 July 2011	Australia	3	0	0	0	0	0
811	Bandise Maku	19 June 2010	Italy	1	0	0	0	0	0
812	Dewald Potgieter	28 November 2009	Ireland	6	5	1	0	0	0
813	Davon Raubenheimer			0	0	0	0	0	0
814	Jean Deysel	21 November 2009	Italy	4	0	0	0	0	0
815	Francois Louw	5 June 2010	Wales	76	50	10	0	0	0
816	Gio Aplon	5 June 2010	Wales	17	25	5	0	0	0
817	Bjorn Basson	5 June 2010	Wales	10	15	3	0	0	0
818	Flip van der Merwe	12 June 2010	France	37	5	1	0	0	0
819	Elton Jantjies	29 September 2012	Australia	46	331	2	66	62	1
820	Pat Lambie	6 November 2010	Ireland	56	153	2	25	27	4
821	Lwazi Mvovo	20 November 2010	Scotland	17	30	6	0	0	0
822	Willem Alberts	13 November 2010	Wales	43	35	7	0	0	0
823	Keegan Daniel	6 November 2010	Ireland	5	0	0	0	0	0
824	Coenie Oosthuizen	9 June 2012	England	30	20	4	0	0	0
825	Deon Stegmann	6 November 2010	Ireland	6	0	0	0	0	0
826	Charl McLeod	30 July 2011	New Zealand	1	0	0	0	0	0
827	Andries Strauss			0	0	0	0	0	0
828	Werner Kruger	23 July 2011	Australia	4	0	0	0	0	0
829	Dean Greyling	23 July 2011	Australia	3	0	0	0	0	0
830	Gerhard Mostert	30 July 2011	New Zealand	2	0	0	0	0	0
831	Marcell Coetzee	9 June 2012	England	31	30	6	0	0	0
832	Juandré Kruger	9 June 2012	England	17	0	0	0	0	0
833	Eben Etzebeth	9 June 2012	England	147	45	9	0	0	0
834	Jacques Potgieter	23 June 2012	England	3	0	0	0	0	0
835	Pat Cilliers	18 August 2012	Argentina	6	0	0	0	0	0
836	JJ Engelbrecht	18 August 2012	Argentina	12	20	4	0	0	0
837	Craig Burden			0	0	0	0	0	0
838	Jano Vermaak	8 June 2013	Italy	3	0	0	0	0	0
839	Johan Goosen	8 September 2012	Australia	13	25	3	2	2	0
840	Duane Vermeulen	8 September 2012	Australia	76	15	3	0	0	0
841	Frans Malherbe	9 November 2013	Wales	76	5	1	0	0	0
842	Jaco Taute	29 September 2012	Australia	4	0	0	0	0	0
843	Arno Botha	8 June 2013	Italy	2	0	0	0	0	0
844	Lionel Mapoe	25 July 2015	New Zealand	14	10	2	0	0	0
845	Raymond Rhule	10 June 2017	France	7	5	1	0	0	0
846	Franco van der Merwe	5 October 2013	New Zealand	1	0	0	0	0	0
847	JC Janse van Rensburg			0	0	0	0	0	0
848	Willie le Roux	8 June 2013	Italy	101	75	15	0	0	0
849	Jan Serfontein	8 June 2013	Italy	35	25	5	0	0	0
850	Trevor Nyakane	8 June 2013	Italy	68	5	1	0	0	0
851	Siya Kolisi	15 June 2013	Scotland	109	80	16	0	0	0
852	Piet van Zyl	15 June 2013	Scotland	3	0	0	0	0	0
853	Lourens Adriaanse	23 November 2013	France	6	0	0	0	0	0
854	Pieter-Steph du Toit	9 November 2013	Wales	104	75	15	0	0	0
855	Cornal Hendricks	14 June 2014	Wales	12	25	5	0	0	0
856	Lood de Jager	14 June 2014	Wales	80	25	5	0	0	0
857	Handré Pollard	28 June 2014	Scotland	88	844	8	132	175	5
858	Marcel van der Merwe	28 June 2014	Scotland	7	0	0	0	0	0
859	Oupa Mohojé	28 June 2014	Scotland	19	0	0	0	0	0
860	Stephan Lewies	28 June 2014	Scotland	1	0	0	0	0	0
861	Marnitz Boshoff	28 June 2014	Scotland	1	2	0	1	0	0
862	Damian de Allende	16 August 2014	Argentina	105	65	13	0	0	0
863	Warren Whiteley	6 September 2014	Australia	23	15	3	0	0	0
864	Cobus Reinach	27 September 2014	Australia	58	105	21	0	0	0
865	Nizaam Carr	22 November 2014	Italy	5	0	0	0	0	0
866	Julian Redelinghuys	22 November 2014	Italy	8	0	0	0	0	0
867	Jesse Kriel	18 July 2015	Australia	96	125	25	0	0	0
868	Vincent Koch	25 July 2015	New Zealand	63	5	1	0	0	0
869	Rudy Paige	7 October 2015	United States	13	5	1	0	0	0
870	Faf de Klerk	11 June 2016	Ireland	60	50	5	5	5	0
871	Ruan Combrinck	18 June 2016	Ireland	7	15	2	1	1	0
872	Franco Mostert	18 June 2016	Ireland	87	20	4	0	0	0
873	Steven Kitshoff	25 June 2016	Ireland	83	10	2	0	0	0
874	Jaco Kriel	25 June 2016	Ireland	11	0	0	0	0	0
875	Bongi Mbonambi	25 June 2016	Ireland	82	75	15	0	0	0
876	Malcolm Marx	17 September 2016	New Zealand	96	160	32	0	0	0
877	Francois Venter	12 November 2016	England	7	5	1	0	0	0
878	Uzair Cassiem	26 November 2016	Wales	8	5	1	0	0	0
879	Jamba Ulengo	26 November 2016	Wales	1	0	0	0	0	0
880	Rohan Janse van Rensburg	26 November 2016	Wales	1	0	0	0	0	0
881	Jean-Luc du Preez	26 November 2016	Wales	14	10	2	0	0	0
882	Ross Cronjé	10 June 2017	France	10	10	2	0	0	0
883	Courtnall Skosan	10 June 2017	France	12	10	2	0	0	0
884	Andries Coetzee	10 June 2017	France	13	0	0	0	0	0
885	Dillyn Leyds	10 June 2017	France	10	5	1	0	0	0
886	Ruan Dreyer	24 June 2017	France	4	5	1	0	0	0
887	Curwin Bosch	19 August 2017	Argentina	2	0	0	0	0	0
888	Wilco Louw	7 October 2017	New Zealand	38	15	3	0	0	0
889	Dan du Preez	18 November 2017	France	6	0	0	0	0	0
890	Warrick Gelant	25 November 2017	Italy	13	15	3	0	0	0
891	Louis Schreuder	2 December 2017	Wales	1	0	0	0	0	0
892	Lukhanyo Am	2 December 2017	Wales	42	35	7	0	0	0
893	Ox Nché	2 June 2018	Wales	55	5	1	0	0	0
894	Jason Jenkins	2 June 2018	Wales	1	0	0	0	0	0
895	Kwagga Smith	2 June 2018	Wales	63	55	11	0	0	0
896	Ivan van Zyl	2 June 2018	Wales	6	0	0	0	0	0
897	Makazole Mapimpi	2 June 2018	Wales	47	165	33	0	0	0
898	André Esterhuizen	2 June 2018	Wales	36	30	6	0	0	0
899	Travis Ismaiel	2 June 2018	Wales	1	5	1	0	0	0
900	Sikhumbuzo Notshe	2 June 2018	Wales	6	0	0	0	0	0
901	Thomas du Toit	2 June 2018	Wales	39	10	2	0	0	0
902	Akker van der Merwe	2 June 2018	Wales	3	0	0	0	0	0
903	Marvin Orie	2 June 2018	Wales	16	0	0	0	0	0
904	Robert du Preez	2 June 2018	Wales	1	3	0	1	0	0
905	Embrose Papier	2 June 2018	Wales	8	5	1	0	0	0
906	RG Snyman	9 June 2018	England	50	15	3	0	0	0
907	Aphiwe Dyantyi	9 June 2018	England	13	30	6	0	0	0
908	S'busiso Nkosi	9 June 2018	England	16	45	9	0	0	0
909	Marco van Staden	18 August 2018	Argentina	38	20	4	0	0	0
910	Damian Willemse	18 August 2018	Argentina	57	81	9	9	4	2
911	Cheslin Kolbe	8 September 2018	Australia	53	170	22	22	12	0
912	Rynhardt Elstadt	20 July 2019	Australia	4	0	0	0	0	0
913	Herschel Jantjies	20 July 2019	Australia	26	30	6	0	0	0
914	Lizo Gqoboka	20 July 2019	Australia	2	0	0	0	0	0
915	Scarra Ntubeni	17 August 2019	Argentina	1	0	0	0	0	0
916	Aphelele Fassi	2 July 2021	Georgia	19	35	7	0	0	0
917	Rosko Specman	2 July 2021	Georgia	1	0	0	0	0	0
918	Jasper Wiese	2 July 2021	Georgia	52	20	4	0	0	0
919	Joseph Dweba	14 August 2021	Argentina	6	0	0	0	0	0
920	Jaden Hendrikse	14 August 2021	Argentina	20	19	2	3	1	0
921	Nico Janse van Rensburg	21 August 2021	Argentina	1	0	0	0	0	0
922	Elrigh Louw	2 July 2022	Wales	16	10	2	0	0	0
923	Salmaan Moerat	2 July 2022	Wales	11	0	0	0	0	0
924	Evan Roos	9 July 2022	Wales	9	5	1	0	0	0
925	Kurt-Lee Arendse	9 July 2022	Wales	37	135	27	0	0	0
926	Ntuthuko Mchunu	9 July 2022	Wales	4	0	0	0	0	0
927	Ruan Nortjé	9 July 2022	Wales	26	5	1	0	0	0
928	Deon Fourie	9 July 2022	Wales	16	10	2	0	0	0
929	Grant Williams	9 July 2022	Wales	32	40	8	0	0	0
930	Canan Moodie	3 September 2022	Australia	26	45	9	0	0	0
931	Manie Libbok	3 September 2022	Australia	36	149	2	50	13	0
932	Jean Kleyn	8 July 2023	Australia	9	0	0	0	0	0
933	Gerhard Steenekamp	5 August 2023	Argentina	25	10	2	0	0	0
934	Jordan Hendrikse	22 June 2024	Wales	2	22	1	7	1	0
935	Edwill van der Merwe	22 June 2024	Wales	8	35	7	0	0	0
936	Ben-Jason Dixon	22 June 2024	Wales	11	10	2	0	0	0
937	Sacha Feinberg-Mngomezulu	22 June 2024	Wales	27	225	10	62	17	0
938	Jan-Hendrik Wessels	20 July 2024	Portugal	17	15	3	0	0	0
939	Johan Grobbelaar	20 July 2024	Portugal	11	5	1	0	0	0
940	Phepsi Buthelezi	20 July 2024	Portugal	1	5	1	0	0	0
941	Morné van den Berg	20 July 2024	Portugal	13	42	8	1	0	0
942	Andre-Hugo Venter	20 July 2024	Portugal	2	5	1	0	0	0
943	Ruan Venter	20 July 2024	Portugal	1	0	0	0	0	0
944	Quan Horn	20 July 2024	Portugal	3	7	1	1	0	0
945	Cameron Hanekom	23 November 2024	Wales	8	10	2	0	0	0
946	Vincent Tshituka	5 July 2025	Italy	2	0	0	0	0	0
947	Cobus Wiese	12 July 2025	Italy	6	0	0	0	0	0
948	Ethan Hooker	12 July 2025	Italy	16	15	3	0	0	0
949	Asenathi Ntlabakanye	12 July 2025	Italy	3	0	0	0	0	0
950	Boan Venter	19 July 2025	Georgia	10	5	1	0	0	0
951	Marnus van der Merwe	19 July 2025	Georgia	3	10	2	0	0	0
952	Neethling Fouché	19 July 2025	Georgia	1	0	0	0	0	0
953	Zachary Porthen	1 November 2025	Japan	8	5	1	0	0	0
954	Paul de Villiers	4 July 2026	England	7	10	2	0	0	0
955	Carlü Sadie	18 July 2026	Wales	1	0	0	0	0	0
956	Ruben van Heerden	18 July 2026	Wales	1	0	0	0	0	0
957	Vusi Moyo	18 July 2026	Wales	1	6	0	3	0	0
958	Jaco Williams	18 July 2026	Wales	1	5	1	0	0	0
As of 15 November 2026
