= Derek van den Berg =

South African rugby union footballer

- Born: Derek Sean van den Berg; 2 January 1946 (age 80) Cape Town, Western Cape
- Height: 1.88 m (6 ft 2 in)
- Weight: 107 kg (236 lb)
- School: Rondebosch Boys' High School
- University: University of Cape Town
- Notable relative: Mauritz van den Berg (father)
- Occupation: medical doctor

Rugby union career
Provincial / State sides
Years	Team	Apps	(Points)
1968–69, 76	Western Province		
1971–75	Natal	45	
International career
Years	Team	Apps	(Points)
1975–1976	South Africa	4	(0)
1974	South Africa (tour)	3	(0)

Derek Sean van den Berg (born 2 January 1946) is a former South African rugby union player.

== Playing career ==
Van den Berg made his provincial debut for Western Province in 1968. After completing his medical studies at the University of Cape Town he moved to Natal en made his debut for Natal in 1971.

Van den Berg tour with the Springboks to France in 1974 but did not play in any test matches. He made his test debut for the Springboks in 1975, during the return tour by France to South Africa, in the first test played on 21 June 1975 at the Free State Stadium in Bloemfontein. Van den Berg played four test matches and three tour matches for the Springboks.

=== Test history ===
No.	Opposition	Result (SA 1st)	Position	Tries	Date	Venue
1.	France	38–25	Thighthead prop		21 Jun 1975	Free State Stadium, Bloemfontein
2.	France	33–18	Tighthead prop		28 Jun 1975	Loftus Versveld, Pretoria
3.	New Zealand	16–7	Tighthead prop		24 Jul 1976	Kings Park Stadium, Durban
4.	New Zealand	9–15	Tighthead prop		14 Aug 1976	Free State Stadium, Bloemfontein

== See also ==
- List of South Africa national rugby union players – Springbok no. 484
