= Faan Conradie =

South African rugby union player

- Full name: Stephanus Christoffel Conradie
- Born: 27 June 1942 Parow, South Africa
- Died: 21 October 1992 (aged 50)

Rugby union career
- Position: Fly–half
Provincial / State sides
Years	Team	Apps	(Points)
- Western Province
International career
Years	Team	Apps	(Points)
1965	South Africa		

Stephanus Christoffel Conradie (27 June 1942 – 21 October 1992) was a South African international rugby union player.

Conradie was born in Parow and attended Hoërskool Outeniqua.

While a Stellenbosch University undergraduate student, Conradie was called up by the Springboks as a replacement during their 1965 tour of Scotland and Ireland. The Springboks had a Test match against Scotland remaining and required another fly–half, as Keith Oxlee was injured and the understudy Jannie Barnard was struggling with his hamstring. Conradie had been part of the pre–tour trials and played for the same club as Springboks scrum–half Dirk de Vos. He ended up not being required as it was decided to risk Barnard, so never featured in a match for the Springboks.

== See also ==
- List of South Africa national rugby union players
