= Louis Slabber =

South African rugby union player

- Full name: Louis Johannes Slabber
- Born: 5 March 1935 Olifantshoek, South Africa
- Died: 11 May 2003 (aged 68)

Rugby union career
- Position: No. 8
Provincial / State sides
Years	Team	Apps	(Points)
- Orange Free State
International career
Years	Team	Apps	(Points)
1965	South Africa		

Louis Johannes Slabber (5 March 1935 – 11 May 2003) was a South African international rugby union player.

Slabber was born and raised in the town of Olifantshoek.

A number eight, Slabber played for Bloemfontein club Collegians and was an Orange Free State representative. He was capped for the Junior Springboks against Argentina and in 1965 was a replacement player for the Springboks on their 1965 tour of Australia and New Zealand. The Springboks were lacking available loose forwards and when winger Kerneels Cronjé was sent home injured they took the opportunity to call up Slabber. He became the fourth Collegians player in the squad and ended the tour without achieving an official cap.

== See also ==
- List of South Africa national rugby union players
