= Frans Erasmus (rugby union) =

South African rugby union footballer

- Born: Frans Stefanus Erasmus; 19 June 1959 Ceres, Western Cape, South Africa
- Died: 7 March 1998 (aged 38)
- Height: 1.78 m (5 ft 10 in)
- Weight: 103 kg (227 lb)
- School: Laingsburg High School, Laingsburg, Western Cape

Rugby union career
- Position(s): Loosehead prop, Tighthead prop
Provincial / State sides
Years	Team	Apps	(Points)
1980	Northern Free State		
1981–85	South Western Districts	63	(52)
1986	Northern Transvaal	12	
1987–94	Eastern Province	119	
International career
Years	Team	Apps	(Points)
1986–1989	South Africa	3	

Frans Stefanus Erasmus (19 June 1959 – 7 March 1998) was a South African rugby union player who played three test matches for the South Africa national rugby union team.

== Playing career ==
Erasmus started his provincial career with Northern Free State in 1980. He also played for South Western Districts, Northern Transvaal for one season and Eastern Province where he become a stalwart, playing 119 matches.

Erasmus made his debut for the Springboks in the third test against the New Zealand Cavaliers on 24 May 1986 at Loftus Versfeld in Pretoria.

=== Test history ===
No.	Opposition	Result (SA 1st)	Position	Tries	Date	Venue
1.	New Zealand Cavaliers	33–18	Loosehead prop		24 May 1986	Loftus Versfeld, Pretoria
2.	New Zealand Cavaliers	24–10	Loosehead prop		31 May 1986	Ellis Park, Johannesburg
3.	World XV	22–16	Tighthead prop		2 Sep 1989	Ellis Park, Johannesburg

== See also ==
- List of South Africa national rugby union players – Springbok no. 549
