= Bobby Johns (rugby union) =

South African rugby union player

- Full name: Robert George Johns
- Born: 21 February 1934
- Died: 1 July 1990 (aged 56)
- School: Diocesan College

Rugby union career
- Position: Hooker
Provincial / State sides
Years	Team	Apps	(Points)
- Western Province
International career
Years	Team	Apps	(Points)
1960–61	South Africa		

Robert George Johns (21 February 1934 – 1 July 1990) was a South African international rugby union player.

Johns was raised in Cape Town and educated at Diocesan College.

A hooker, Johns played for Cape Town club Villagers and represented Western Province. He was a replacement player for the Springboks on their 1960–61 tour of Europe, taking the place of injured front rower Doug Holton. As an understudy to Abie Malan, Johns remained on the bench for most of the tour, only appearing in a match at Newport.

== See also ==
- List of South Africa national rugby union players
