= Piet Botha (rugby union) =

South African rugby union player

- Full name: Pieter Hendrik Botha
- Born: 13 September 1935 Rustenburg, South Africa
- Died: 2 April 2024 (aged 88)
- Height: 1.96 m (6 ft 5 in)
- Weight: 112.5 kg (248 lb)

Rugby union career
- Position: Lock
Provincial / State sides
Years	Team	Apps	(Points)
- Transvaal
International career
Years	Team	Apps	(Points)
1965	South Africa	2	(0)

Pieter Hendrik Botha (13 September 1935 – 2 April 2024) was a South African international rugby union player.

Botha was born in Rustenburg and educated at Hoërskool Bekker.

A lock, Botha spent his provincial career with Transvaal, aside from a short stint in Western Province. He gained Springboks representative honours on their 1965 tour of Australia and New Zealand and appeared in both Test matches against the Wallabies, partnering Tiny Naudé in the second tow. For the New Zealand leg of the tour, Botha was hampered by a dislocated shoulder, and appeared in only the minor fixtures.

== See also ==
- List of South Africa national rugby union players
