= Robbie Blair =

South African rugby union footballer

- Born: Robert Blair; 3 June 1953 (age 73) Johannesburg, Gauteng
- Height: 1.78 m (5 ft 10 in)
- Weight: 76 kg (168 lb)
- School: Hoërskool Helpmekaar, Grey College, Bloemfontein
- University: Stellenbosch University

Rugby union career
- Position: Fly-half
Amateur team(s)
Years	Team	Apps	(Points)
1974–1980	Maties		
Provincial / State sides
Years	Team	Apps	(Points)
1974–1980, 1984	Western Province	75	(858)
1981–1983	Transvaal		
International career
Years	Team	Apps	(Points)
1977	South Africa	1	(21)

Robert 'Robbie' Blair (born 3 June 1953 in Johannesburg, South Africa) is a former South African rugby union player.

== Playing career ==
Blair matriculated at Grey College in Bloemfontein, after which he went to the University of Stellenbosch. In 1972, his first year at university, he was selected for the University's under–20 team and the next year he gained provincial under–20 colours for Western Province. He made his senior provincial debut for Western Province in 1974 and played 74 matches for the union from 1974 to 1980 and scored 858 points, which was the provincial record up to 1987. He played his 75th match for Western Province as a replacement in the last minutes of the 1984 Currie Cup final. From 1981 to 1983, Blair played for Transvaal and in 1983 he scored 223 points, a Transvaal record for a season, that was bettered in 1989 by Cameron Oliver.

Blair played his first and only test match for the Springboks against the World XV on 27 August 1977 at Loftus Versfeld in Pretoria. He scored 21 points in this match.

=== Test history ===
No.	Opposition	Result (SA 1st)	Position	Points	Date	Venue
1.	World XV	45–24	Fly-half	21 (3 conv, 5 pen)	27 August 1977	Loftus Versfeld, Pretoria

== See also ==
- List of South Africa national rugby union players – Springbok no. 494
