= Mike Jennings (rugby union) =

South African rugby union player

- Full name: Michael William Jennings
- Born: 21 December 1946 (age 79) Randfontein, South Africa
- Height: 6 ft 2 in (188 cm)
- Weight: 14 st 9 lb (205 lb; 93 kg)

Rugby union career
- Position: No. 8
International career
Years	Team	Apps	(Points)
1969–70	South Africa		

Michael William Jennings (born 21 December 1946) is a South African former international rugby union player.

Born in Randfontein, Jennings is the son of Springboks prop forward CB Jennings and attended Dale College in King William's Town. He participated at the inaugural Craven Week in 1964 and was one of four to become a Springbok.

Jennings represented several provinces while obtaining teaching qualifications, turning out for North Eastern Cape, Boland, Western Province, Transvaal and Eastern Transvaal over the years. While attached to Boland, Jennings gained a Springboks call up for their 1969–70 tour of Britain and Ireland, where his participation was limited to eight non Test fixtures. His customary position was as a number eight.

== See also ==
- List of South Africa national rugby union players
