= Stompie van der Merwe =

South African rugby union player

- Full name: Hendrik Stefanus van der Merwe
- Born: 24 August 1936 Krugersdorp, South Africa
- Died: 4 June 1988 (aged 51)
- Height: 1.89 m (6 ft 2 in)
- Weight: 99.8 kg (220 lb)
- Occupation: Building inspector

Rugby union career
- Position: Lock
Provincial / State sides
Years	Team	Apps	(Points)
- Northern Transvaal
International career
Years	Team	Apps	(Points)
1960–64	South Africa	5	(0)

Hendrik Stefanus van der Merwe (24 August 1936 – 4 June 1988), known as Stompie van der Merwe, was a South African international rugby union player.

Born in Krugersdorp, van der Merwe was educated at Hoërskool Hendrik Verwoerd.

Known by the nickname "Stompie" (Afrikaans slang for short), van der Merwe was in reality a tall lock forward. He made his Springboks debut against the All Blacks at Boet Erasmus Stadium in 1960 and was a reserve through their 1960–61 tour of Europe, as back up for Johan Claassen and Avril Malan. A back injury limited his participation during the tour and he didn't feature in any of the internationals fixtures. In 1963, van der Merwe got an extended run in the Springboks team, taking the place of Claassen for three home Test matches against the Wallabies. He received a fifth and final cap the following year against France at Springs.

== See also ==
- List of South Africa national rugby union players
