= Martin Janse van Rensburg =

South African rugby union player (1944–2017)

- Full name: Marthinus Coenraad Janse van Rensburg
- Born: 29 December 1944 Ladysmith, Natal, South Africa
- Died: 16 April 2017 (aged 72)
- Height: 6 ft 5½ in
- Weight: 16 st 4 lb (228 lb; 103 kg)

Rugby union career
- Position: Lock
Provincial / State sides
Years	Team	Apps	(Points)
- Natal
International career
Years	Team	Apps	(Points)
1969–70	South Africa		

Marthinus Coenraad Janse van Rensburg (29 December 1944 – 16 April 2017) was a South African international rugby union player.

Born in Ladysmith, van Rensburg was educated at Durban's Port Natal School.

A giant lock forward, van Rensburg represented Natal from 1965 and was a member of the Springboks squad on their 1969–70 tour of Britain and Ireland, where he played only minor fixtures. His tour was disrupted by a neck injury suffered against Swansea, for which he was carried off on a stretcher.

== See also ==
- List of South Africa national rugby union players
