= Renier Grobler =

South African rugby union player

- Full name: Renier Niccolaas Grobler
- Born: 14 November 1946 Luanshya, Northern Rhodesia (now Zambia)
- Died: 26 May 1971 (aged 24) Cape Town, South Africa
- Height: 5 ft 10.5 in (179 cm)
- Weight: 13 st 3 lb (185 lb; 84 kg)
- School: Sundra High School
- Occupation: SAAF corporal

Rugby union career
- Position: Wing three–quarter
Provincial / State sides
Years	Team	Apps	(Points)
1969	Northern Transvaal		
International career
Years	Team	Apps	(Points)
1969–70	South Africa		

Renier Niccolaas Grobler (14 November 1946 – 26 May 1971) was a South African international rugby union player.

== Early life ==
Grobler was born in Luanshya, Northern Rhodesia, and educated at Sundra High School outside Delmas.

== Rugby career ==
A wing three–quarter, Grobler gained a Springboks call up in 1969 after impressing from his three provincial appearances for Northern Transvaal. He had scored a try on debut for Northern Transvaal in a defeat of the touring Wallabies and also scored a try in the 1969 Currie Cup final. His Springboks opportunity came on their 1969–70 tour of Britain and Ireland, but he didn't get to play any of the international fixtures and was sidelined for the final few weeks with a fractured thumb.

== Plane accident ==
Grobler served as a corporal in the South African Air Force and on 26 May 1971 was one of 11 personnel killed when three of their aircraft crashed into Devil's Peak due to poor visibility. The planes were undertaking a practice run for an event to celebrate the 10th anniversary of Republic Day. It was the worst peacetime aviation accident involving multiple aircraft to occur in South Africa.

== See also ==
- List of South Africa national rugby union players
