= Natie Rens =

South African rugby player

- Full name: Ignatius Johannes Rens
- Born: 19 July 1929 Potchefstroom, South Africa
- Died: 19 December 1989 (aged 60)
- Height: 1.80 m (5 ft 11 in)
- Weight: 69.9 kg (154 lb)

Rugby union career
- Position: Fly–half
Provincial / State sides
Years	Team	Apps	(Points)
- Transvaal
International career
Years	Team	Apps	(Points)
1953	South Africa	2	(19)

Ignatius Johannes Rens (19 July 1929 – 19 December 1989) was a South African dual–code international rugby player.

Born in Potchefstroom, Rens started out in rugby union. He was a Transvaal representative player, capped twice for the Springboks, both times as a fly–half in their home series against the Wallabies in 1953. Coming into the XV for the third Test match in Durban, Rens contributed three conversions in a 18-8 win, then for the final Test match in Port Elizabeth kicked a further 13 points in another Springboks win, which included a drop goal.

Rens later switched to rugby league and played as a five–eighth for Southern Suburbs. In 1963, Rens was a member of the first South Africa national rugby league team to undertake a tour of Australia.

Originally a farmer, Rens also operated the Punch Bowl hotel in Transvaal for a period in the 1970s.

== See also ==
- List of South Africa national rugby union players
