= Robert Twigge =

South African rugby union player

- Full name: Robert John Twigge
- Born: 24 July 1936 Windsorton, South Africa
- Died: 1 July 2017 (aged 80)

Rugby union career
- Position: Wing three–quarter
Provincial / State sides
| Years | Team | Apps | (Points) |
| 1959–62 | Northern Transvaal | | |
International career
| Years | Team | Apps | (Points) |
| 1960 | South Africa | 1 | (0) |

Robert John Twigge (24 July 1936 – 1 July 2017) was a South African international rugby union player.

Twigge hailed from the farming town of Windsorton, north of Kimberley.

A wing three–quarter, Twigge played for Northern Transvaal club Silverton. He toured South America with the Junior Springboks in 1959 and scored a team record 14 tries, one of which came against Argentina. In 1960, Twigge was capped for the Springboks when he featured on the left wing against Scotland at Boet Erasmus Stadium.

== See also ==
- List of South Africa national rugby union players
