= Dendy Lawton =

South African rugby union player

- Full name: Alfred Dendy Lawton
- Born: 21 August 1911 Cape Town, South Africa
- Died: 6 May 1967 (aged 55) near Umtali, Rhodesia
- Height: 181 cm (5 ft 11 in)
- Weight: 81 kg (179 lb)
- School: Diocesan College

Rugby union career
- Position: Wing three–quarter
Provincial / State sides
| Years | Team | Apps | (Points) |
- Western Province
International career
| Years | Team | Apps | (Points) |
| 1937 | South Africa | | |

Alfred Dendy Lawton (21 August 1911 – 6 May 1967) was a South African international rugby union player.

Lawton was born in Cape Town and educated at Diocesan College.

A wing three–quarter, Lawton relied on his fend and side stepping abilities over raw pace. He had a reputation as a daring player who would barge through opponents towards the try line. In 1937, Lawton was a member of the Springboks squad for a tour of Australia and New Zealand. He got nicknamed the "egg king" on the voyage over due to his morning diet of 12 eggs, eaten prior to a full breakfast. His tour was limited to the minor fixtures, with no Test match appearances. He also represented Western Province.

Lawton, a lawyer by profession, served with the police force during the Rhodesian Bush War and was killed in a plane crash in 1967, while taking part in an operation over a farm in Penhalonga.

== See also ==
- List of South Africa national rugby union players
