= Dick Putter =

South African rugby union player

- Full name: Diederick Johannes Putter
- Born: 13 February 1932 Nylstroom, South Africa
- Died: 31 October 2002 (aged 70)
- Height: 1.83 m (6 ft 0 in)
- Weight: 93 kg (205 lb)

Rugby union career
- Position: Prop
Provincial / State sides
Years	Team	Apps	(Points)
- Western Transvaal
International career
Years	Team	Apps	(Points)
1963	South Africa	3	(0)

Diederick Johannes Putter (13 February 1932 – 31 October 2002), known as Dick Putter, was a South African international rugby union player.

Born in Nylstroom, Transvaal, Putter learned his rugby at Alma Primary School and initially played as a fullback. He began attending Nylstroom High School after World War II and was moved into the front row with their under–15s, developing into a powerful prop forward. When he finished school, Putter joined the University of Potchefstroom rugby club.

Putter toured Argentina with the Junior Springboks in 1959 and had accumulated a century of representative appearances for Western Transvaal by the time he gained full international honours in 1963, for the Springboks' home series against the Wallabies. He was the tight–head prop in three of the four Test matches, including the finale in Port Elizabeth where he was cut in the mouth by a projectile thrown onto the field by rioters. During the same tour, Putter captained Western Transvaal against Wallabies. He moved to Windhoek in 1967 and became captain of South West Africa.

== See also ==
- List of South Africa national rugby union players
