= Stevie Joubert =

South African rugby union player

- Full name: Stephanus Johannes Joubert
- Born: 8 April 1887 Uniondale, South Africa
- Died: 27 March 1939 (aged 51)
- Height: 1.68 m (5 ft 6 in)
- Weight: 65.3 kg (144 lb)
- School: Paarl Gimnasium

Rugby union career
- Position: Fullback
Provincial / State sides
Years	Team	Apps	(Points)
- Western Province
International career
Years	Team	Apps	(Points)
1906	South Africa	3	(8)

Stephanus Johannes Joubert (8 April 1887 – 27 March 1939) was a South African international rugby union player.

Born in Uniondale, Joubert learned his rugby as a pupil at Paarl Gimnasium. He matriculated to Victoria College, Stellenbosch in 1903 and played varsity rugby. A diminutive player, Joubert proved best suited to playing fullback, but would also be utilised as a halfback and three–quarter for the college.

Joubert was a Western Province representative and at the age of 19 gained a Springboks call up for their 1906–07 tour of Europe, as one of three fullbacks selected. He missed the first several weeks of the tour, due in part to academic commitments, but arrived in time to debut in the second of the five international fixtures, against Ireland at Belfast. For the next Test match, Joubert was amongst the Springboks' best players in a win over Wales, contributing a try and conversion. He gained a third and final cap in a 3–3 draw against England at Twickenham.

== See also ==
- List of South Africa national rugby union players
