= Poens Prinsloo =

South African rugby union player

- Full name: Josua Prinsloo
- Born: 11 October 1935 Piketberg, South Africa
- Died: 13 June 2017 (aged 81)
- Height: 1.89 m (6 ft 2 in)
- Weight: 86.2 kg (190 lb)

Rugby union career
- Position: No. 8
Provincial / State sides
Years	Team	Apps	(Points)
1955–63	Northern Transvaal	24	
International career
Years	Team	Apps	(Points)
1963	South Africa	1	(0)

Josua "Poens" Prinsloo (11 October 1935 – 13 June 2017) was a South African international rugby union player.

Prinsloo was born and raised in the town of Piketberg in Cape Province.

In 1959, Prinsloo represented South Africa as a pole vaulter.

Prinsloo, a policeman by profession, played rugby for Northern Transvaal and was capped once by the Springboks, deputising for number eight Doug Hopwood against the touring 1963 Wallabies at Ellis Park.

== See also ==
- List of South Africa national rugby union players
