= Tom van Vuuren =

South African rugby union player

- Full name: Thomas Frederick Jansen van Vuuren
- Born: 9 July 1889 Adelaide, South Africa
- Died: 7 July 1947 (aged 57) Albany, South Africa
- Height: 6 ft 4½ in
- Weight: 208 lb (94 kg)
- School: Paul Roos Gymnasium

Rugby union career
- Position: Forward
Provincial / State sides
Years	Team	Apps	(Points)
- Eastern Province
International career
Years	Team	Apps	(Points)
1912–13	South Africa	5	(0)

Thomas Frederick Jansen van Vuuren (9 July 1889 – 7 July 1947) was a South African international rugby union player.

Born on Glen Lynden Farm in Adelaide, van Vuuren was educated at Paul Roos Gymnasium. He based himself in Grahamstown through his career and was associated with Albany RFC.

A sizeable forward, van Vuuren was 6 ft 4½ in tall and weighted 208 pounds at the time of his Springboks call up for their 1912–13 tour of Europe, where he featured in all five international fixtures to help secure a whitewash.

Outside of rugby, van Vuuren worked as both a farmer and teacher.

== See also ==
- List of South Africa national rugby union players
