= Piet Kruger =

South African rugby union footballer

- Born: Petrus Ebersohn Kruger; 11 April 1958 (age 68) Brits, North West, South Africa
- Height: 1.81 m (5 ft 11 in)
- Weight: 105 kg (231 lb)
- School: Brits High School
- University: University of Pretoria

Rugby union career
- Position: Tighthead prop
Provincial / State sides
Years	Team	Apps	(Points)
1981–1985	Northern Transvaal	64	
1986–	Transvaal		
International career
Years	Team	Apps	(Points)
1986	South Africa	2	

Petrus Ebersohn Kruger (born 11 April 1958), is a former South African rugby union player who played two test matches for the Springboks.

== Playing career ==
Kruger made his provincial debut for Northern Transvaal in 1981. After five seasons with Northern Transvaal, he moved to Transvaal at the beginning of the 1986 season. He made his debut for the Springboks in the third test against the New Zealand Cavaliers on 24 May 1986 at Loftus Versfeld in Pretoria, when he and Frans Erasmus replaced the props from the first two tests, Anton Barnard and Flippie van der Merwe.

=== Test history ===
No.	Opposition	Result (SA 1st)	Position	Tries	Date	Venue
1.	New Zealand Cavaliers	33–18	Tighthead prop		24 May 1986	Loftus Versfeld, Pretoria
2.	New Zealand Cavaliers	24–10	Tighthead prop		31 May 1986	Ellis Park, Johannesburg

== See also ==
- List of South Africa national rugby union players – Springbok no. 550
