= Attie Baard =

South African international rugby union player

- Full name: Adriaan Pieter Baard
- Born: 17 May 1933 Kakamas, South Africa
- Died: 30 April 2009 (aged 75) Somerset West, South Africa
- Height: 1.90 m (6 ft 3 in)
- Weight: 93 kg (205 lb)

Rugby union career
- Position: Back row
International career
Years	Team	Apps	(Points)
1960	South Africa	1	(0)

Adriaan Pieter Baard (17 May 1933 – 30 April 2009) was a South African international rugby union player.

Baard was born in Kakamas and attended Hoërskool Martin Oosthuizen during his youth. He studied medicine at Stellenbosch University, but wasn't involved in their rugby program until his fifth year.

A back row forward, Baard was a member of the Springboks squad for their 1960–61 tour of Europe as an understudy to number eight Doug Hopwood. He made a total of 13 tour appearances, some as a flanker, and was capped in the Test match against Ireland, for which Hopwood was sidelined with injury. At provincial level, Baard represented both Western Province and Eastern Province, the latter while based in Port Elizabeth.

Baard was a medical doctor by profession and lived his retirement in Somerset West.

== See also ==
- List of South Africa national rugby union players
