= Mike Lawless =

South African rugby union player

- Full name: Michael John Lawless
- Born: 17 September 1941 (age 85) Cape Town, South Africa
- Height: 1.80 m (5 ft 11 in)
- Weight: 76.6 kg (169 lb)

Rugby union career
- Position: Fly–half
Provincial / State sides
Years	Team	Apps	(Points)
- Western Province
International career
Years	Team	Apps	(Points)
1964–70	South Africa	4	(0)

Michael John Lawless (born 17 September 1941) is a South African former international rugby union player.

Born in Cape Town, Lawless attended Rondebosch Boys' High School and was a Junior Springbok representative.

Lawless represented Western Province in the 1960s and was capped four times by the Springboks. After helping Western Province defeat the touring French in 1964, Lawless was selected at fly–half for the one-off Test match at Springs, but was discarded following a heavy loss. He was recalled to the Springboks squad in 1969 for their tour of Britain and Ireland, during which he featured in three of the four international matches.

One of his three sons, Gavin Lawless, was a fullback in the Super 12.

== See also ==
- List of South Africa national rugby union players
