= Johann van der Merwe =

South African rugby union player

- Full name: Johann Philmar van der Merwe
- Born: 7 December 1947 (age 78) Uitenhage, South Africa
- Height: 5 ft 9 in (175 cm)
- Weight: 11 st 11 lb (165 lb; 75 kg)

Rugby union career
- Position: Centre
Provincial / State sides
Years	Team	Apps	(Points)
- Western Province
International career
Years	Team	Apps	(Points)
1970	South Africa	1	(0)

Johann Philmar van der Merwe (born 7 December 1947) is a South African former international rugby union player.

Born in Uitenhage, van der Merwe was educated at Brandwag High School and Stellenbosch University.

A strongly built centre, van der Merwe played for Maties and was a Western Province representative from 1968. He fell out of favour with his province in 1969, so was considered a surprise selection to the Springboks squad for their 1969–70 tour of Britain and Ireland. For the final international fixture against Wales, van der Merwe gained the only cap of his Springboks career, replacing an out of form Mannetjies Roux in the line up. The match finished in a 6–6 draw.

== See also ==
- List of South Africa national rugby union players
