= Johan van der Schyff =

South African rugby union player

- Full name: Pieter Johannes van der Schyff
- Born: 19 January 1942 (age 84) Ventersdorp, South Africa
- School: Potchefstroom Gimnasium

Rugby union career
- Position: Centre
Provincial / State sides
Years	Team	Apps	(Points)
- Transvaal
- Western Transvaal
International career
Years	Team	Apps	(Points)
1969–70	South Africa		

Pieter Johannes van der Schyff (born 19 January 1942) is a South African former international rugby union player.

Born on a farm outside Ventersdorp, van der Schyff learned his rugby at Vlakpan Primary School and later attended Potchefstroom Gimnasium, earning Western Transvaal Schools representative honours as a centre.

After moving to Vereeniging, van der Schyff debuted for Transvaal in 1963 and won their most improved player award that season, but was largely hampered by injury problems during his early career. He earned Junior Springboks honours against Argentina in 1965 and attended several Springboks trials before getting his opportunity on their 1969–70 tour of Britain and Ireland, by which time he had joined his brother Jan at Western Transvaal. He didn't feature in any of the Test matches and was replaced mid tour by veteran Mannetjies Roux after picking up an injury.

== See also ==
- List of South Africa national rugby union players
