= Dick Lockyear =

South African rugby union player

- Full name: Richard John Lockyear
- Born: 26 June 1931 Kimberley, Griqualand West, South Africa
- Died: 3 March 1988 (aged 56)
- Height: 1.78 m (5 ft 10 in)
- Weight: 77.1 kg (170 lb)
- School: Kimberley Boys' High School

Rugby union career
- Position: Scrum–half
Provincial / State sides
Years	Team	Apps	(Points)
- Griqualand West
International career
Years	Team	Apps	(Points)
1960–61	South Africa	6	(20)

Richard John Lockyear (26 June 1931 – 3 March 1988) was a South African international rugby union player.

== Biography ==
Lockyear was born in Kimberley and educated at Kimberley Boys' High School.

A scrum–half, Lockyear was known as a good wet weather player. He represented Griqualand West and twice toured Europe with combined varsity sides. After playing four home Test matches against the All Blacks in 1960, Lockyear made his third visit to Europe in 1961, as a member of the Springboks. He featured in their matches against Ireland at Lansdowne Road and France at Colombes, both as vice captain, while he also stood in for Avril Malan as captain for at least one minor fixture. During his six Springboks appearances, Lockyear amassed 20 points, all off his boot.

== See also ==
- List of South Africa national rugby union players
