= Fanie Kuhn =

South African rugby union player

- Full name: Stefanus Petrus Kuhn
- Born: 12 June 1935 Krugersdorp, South Africa
- Died: 21 January 2014 (aged 78) Krugersdorp, South Africa

Rugby union career
- Position: Prop
International career
Years	Team	Apps	(Points)
1960–65	South Africa	19	(0)

Stefanus Petrus Kuhn (12 June 1935 – 21 January 2014) was a South African rugby union international.

Kuhn, born and raised in Krugersdorp, played his provincial rugby for Transvaal.

A prop, Kuhn represented the Springboks in 19 Test matches between 1960 and 1965, debuting against the All Blacks in Bloemfontein. He played all five Tests on the highly successful 1960–61 tour of Europe. Overlooked for the 1965 Australia and New Zealand trip, Kuhn announced his retirement from rugby union in October that year.

Kuhn was married with three children.

== See also ==
- List of South Africa national rugby union players
