= Ronnie Potgieter =

South African rugby union player

- Full name: Ronald Potgieter
- Born: 18 November 1943 Thabazimbi, South Africa
- Died: 23 September 2021 (aged 77)
- Height: 6 ft (183 cm)

Rugby union career
- Position: Prop
Provincial / State sides
Years	Team	Apps	(Points)
- Northern Transvaal
International career
Years	Team	Apps	(Points)
1969–70	South Africa		

Ronald Potgieter (18 November 1943 – 23 September 2021) was a South African international rugby union player.

Potgieter was born in the iron mining town of Thabazimbi and educated at the College of the Little Flower in Pietersburg, before pursuing an engineering degree at university. He was an SA Universities representative player.

A prop, Potgieter made his provincial debut for Northern Transvaal in 1967 and was a member of the Springboks squad on their 1969–70 tour of Britain and Ireland. He featured in six uncapped fixtures and had to return home from the tour early after suffering a knee ligament injury against South Western Counties in Exeter.

== See also ==
- List of South Africa national rugby union players
