= Albie de Waal =

South African rugby union player

- Full name: Albertus Nicolaas de Waal
- Born: 4 February 1942 (age 84) Moorreesburg, South Africa
- Height: 1.86 m (6 ft 1 in)
- Weight: 88.9 kg (196 lb)

Rugby union career
- Position: No. 8
Provincial / State sides
Years	Team	Apps	(Points)
- Western Province
International career
Years	Team	Apps	(Points)
1967	South Africa	4	(0)

Albertus Nicolaas de Waal (born 4 February 1942) is a South African former international rugby union player.

Born in Moorreesburg, de Waal was educated at Hoërskool Dirkie Uys and Stellenbosch University.

A number eight, de Waal gained Springboks caps in all four home internationals against France in 1967, with Jan Ellis and Piet Greyling as his flankers. He also represented Western Province. At club level, de Waal played for Maties and kicked the winning drop goal in their 1968 inter–varsity match against the University of Cape Town.

== See also ==
- List of South Africa national rugby union players
