= Eric van der Merwe =

South African rugby union player

- Full name: Carel Eric van der Merwe
- Born: 4 April 1977 (age 49)
- School: Stellenberg High School

Rugby union career
- Position: Prop / Loose forward
Provincial / State sides
Years	Team	Apps	(Points)
- Boland
- Hawke's Bay
International career
Years	Team	Apps	(Points)
2000	South Africa		

Carel Eric van der Merwe (born 4 April 1977) is a South African former professional rugby union player.

A Stellenberg High School product, van der Merwe was a Western Province under-21 representative player and spent some of his early career in France playing with Rugby Club d'Arras, before establishing himself in the Boland Cavaliers front-row in 1999.

Van der Merwe earned Springboks selection in 2000 as part of their 40-man squad for tours of Argentina, Ireland and the United Kingdom, but would not feature in any Test matches.

In 2001, van der Merwe had a season in New Zealand provincial rugby, as a loose forward with Hawke's Bay.

== See also ==
- List of South Africa national rugby union players
