= Haas Schoeman =

South African rugby union player

- Full name: Johan Schoeman
- Born: 15 March 1940 Prince Albert, South Africa
- Died: 1 January 2006 (aged 65) Cape Town, South Africa
- Height: 1.83 m (6 ft 0 in)
- Weight: 88.5 kg (195 lb)

Rugby union career
- Position: Flanker
Provincial / State sides
Years	Team	Apps	(Points)
- Western Province
International career
Years	Team	Apps	(Points)
1963–65	South Africa	7	(0)

Johan "Haas" Schoeman (15 March 1940 – 1 January 2006) was a South African international rugby union player.

Schoeman was born in Prince Albert and attended Paarl Boys' High School.

A flanker, Schoeman started out in the under 19s at Stellenbosch University in 1959 and made his representative debut for Western Province three years later. He was capped seven times for the Springboks, debuting in a home series against the touring 1963 Wallabies. In 1965, Schoeman undertook two tours with the Springboks, to Europe and Oceania.

Schoeman was employed by an accountancy firm in Cape Town.

== See also ==
- List of South Africa national rugby union players
