= Ou-Boet Strydom =

South African rugby union player

- Full name: Louis Jacobus Strydom
- Born: 27 October 1921 Robertson, South Africa
- Died: 11 May 2003 (aged 81)
- Height: 1.83 m (6 ft 0 in)
- Weight: 93.9 kg (207 lb)

Rugby union career
- Position: Winger / Flanker
Provincial / State sides
Years	Team	Apps	(Points)
- Boland
- Northern Transvaal
International career
Years	Team	Apps	(Points)
1949	South Africa	2	(0)

Louis Jacobus Strydom (27 October 1921 – 11 May 2003), known as Ou-Boet Strydom, was a South African international rugby union player.

Strydom hailed from the town of Robertson and was a Boland Schools representative player.

Initially a three–quarter, Strydom started his provincial career as a 19 year old winger for Boland. He moved to Pretoria in 1942 to work for the Prison Service and subsequently played for the Prison Officers club. His early representative appearances for Northern Transvaal were as a three–quarter, until he was transferred to the pack in 1946, and it was as a wing–forward that he won a Springboks call up in 1949. He was capped in the opening two Test matches against the touring 1949 All Blacks, at Newlands and Ellis Park respectively.

== See also ==
- List of South Africa national rugby union players
