= Jack van Druten =

South African rugby union player

- Full name: Nicolaas Jan Valkenburg van Druten
- Born: 12 June 1898 Griekwastad, South Africa
- Died: 16 January 1989 (aged 90)
- Height: 1.83 m (6 ft 0 in)
- Weight: 91.6 kg (202 lb)

Rugby union career
- Position: Back row
Provincial / State sides
Years	Team	Apps	(Points)
- Transvaal
International career
Years	Team	Apps	(Points)
1924–28	South Africa	8	(6)

Nicolaas Jan Valkenburg "Jack" van Druten (12 June 1898 – 16 January 1989) was a South African international rugby union player of the 1920s.

Born in Griekwastad, Cape Province, van Druten attended South African College Schools, before pursuing medical degrees at the University of Cape Town and Trinity College Dublin.

A Transvaal representative, van Druten was a strongly built player who specialised in the back row of the scrum, but had ball handling skills comparable to a halfback and was good on his feet. He was capped eight times for the Springboks, with four Test matches each in home series against the 1924 British Lions and 1928 All Blacks.

== See also ==
- List of South Africa national rugby union players
