= Carrots Geraghty =

South African rugby union player

- Full name: Edwin Martin Geraghty
- Born: 20 April 1927 Port Beaufort, South Africa
- Died: 13 November 2015 (aged 88)
- Height: 1.74 m (5 ft 9 in)

Rugby union career
- Position: Wing three–quarter
Provincial / State sides
Years	Team	Apps	(Points)
- Border
International career
Years	Team	Apps	(Points)
1949	South Africa	1	(0)

Edwin Martin Geraghty (20 April 1927 – 13 November 2015) was a South African international rugby union player.

Geraghty was born in Port Beaufort and educated at East London Technikon.

A speedy wing three–quarter, Geraghty played for East London–based club Grens and the Hamiltons. He represented Border and won his Springboks call up after impressing in the provincial side's 6–6 draw against the touring All Blacks in 1949. Replacing Floors Duvenhage, Geraghty played in the fourth and final Test match at Port Elizabeth, as selectors attempted to counter the pace of Peter Henderson. The Springboks won the match and Geraghty's performance was reviewed favourably by the New Zealand press, but this would remain his only cap.

== See also ==
- List of South Africa national rugby union players
