= Ben du Toit =

South African rugby union player

- Full name: Barend Abraham du Toit
- Born: 10 November 1912 Malmesbury, South Africa
- Died: 25 January 1989 (aged 76)
- Height: 1.86 m (6 ft 1 in)
- Weight: 95.3 kg (210 lb)

Rugby union career
- Position: Flanker
Provincial / State sides
Years	Team	Apps	(Points)
- Northern Transvaal
International career
Years	Team	Apps	(Points)
1938	South Africa	3	(3)

Barend Abraham du Toit (10 November 1912 – 25 January 1989) was a South African international rugby union player.

Born in Malmesbury, du Toit was educated at Paarl Boys' High School and Stellenbosch University.

Originally a scrum–half, du Toit was developed into a flanker by Stellenbosch coach Oubaas Mark and was a member of the Springboks squad for their 1937 tour of Australasia, suffering a spinal injury against New South Wales which sidelined him for much of the New Zealand leg. Despite receiving advice that he risked paralysis, du Toit returned to the field for a tour match at Blenheim and also featured in their win over Ranfurly Shield holders Southland.

In 1938, du Toit was capped in three home Test matches against the British Lions.

== See also ==
- List of South Africa national rugby union players
