= Lofty Nel =

South African rugby union player

- Full name: Johannes Arnoldus Nel
- Born: 11 August 1935 Pretoria, South Africa
- Died: 18 July 2016 (aged 80) Pretoria, South Africa
- Height: 6 ft 4 in (193 cm)
- Weight: 217 lb (98 kg)
- School: Hoërskool Jan van Riebeeck

Rugby union career
- Position: Loose forward
Provincial / State sides
Years	Team	Apps	(Points)
- Transvaal
-	Western Transvaal		
-	South Eastern Transvaal		
International career
Years	Team	Apps	(Points)
1960–70	South Africa	11	(0)

Johannes Arnoldus "Lofty" Nel (11 August 1935 – 18 July 2016) was a South African rugby union international who represented the Springboks in 11 Test matches as a flanker and number eight.

Nicknamed "Lofty" on account of his 193 cm frame, Nel was born in Pretoria and educated at Hoërskool Jan van Riebeeck, a school in Randfontein. He was a nephew of former Natal and Northern Transvaal captain Hennie Nel.

Nel debuted for the Springboks in the 1960 Johannesburg Test against the All Blacks. Of his 11 Test matches, eight came against the All Blacks and he was the first Springbok to appear against three successive New Zealand teams (1960, 1965 and 1970).

At provincial level, Nel started out at Transvaal but spent most of his career at Western Transvaal, captaining them to the 1964 SARB Board Trophy. His only son, Pieter, played for Northern Transvaal as a centre and wing from 1987 to 1992.

== See also ==
- List of South Africa national rugby union players
