= Willie Rousseau =

South African rugby union player

- Full name: Willem Petrus Rousseau
- Born: 11 August 1906 Steynsburg, Orange River Colony
- Died: 28 December 1996 (aged 90) Hermanus, Western Cape, South Africa

Rugby union career
- Position: Centre
International career
| Years | Team | Apps | (Points) |
| 1928 | South Africa | 2 | (0) |

Willem Petrus Rousseau (11 August 1906 – 28 December 1996) was a South African international rugby union player.

Rousseau was born in Steynsburg and educated at Rondebosch Boys' High School.

A centre three-quarter, Rousseau gained two Springboks caps against the All Blacks on their 1928 tour of South Africa, debuting in the 3rd Test of the series at Port Elizabeth. He also faced the All Blacks in a tour match with Western Province and kicked a drop goal to help his side secure victory.

Rousseau attended Brasenose College, Oxford, gaining his rugby blue in 1929.

== See also ==
- List of South Africa national rugby union players
