= Attie Strauss =

South African rugby union footballer

- Born: Jacobus Adriaan Strauss; 2 September 1959 (age 67) Calvinia, Northern Cape
- Height: 1.89 m (6 ft 2 in)
- Weight: 110 kg (243 lb)
- School: Boland Agricultural High School, Paarl

Rugby union career
Provincial / State sides
Years	Team	Apps	(Points)
1983–1985	Western Province	22	(4)
International career
Years	Team	Apps	(Points)
1984	South Africa	2	

Jacobus Adriaan 'Attie' Strauss (born 2 September 1959) is a former South African rugby union player.

== Playing career ==
Strauss finished his schooling at Boland Agricultural High School in Paarl and then joined the South African Correctional Services in Pretoria. He played for the Northern Transvaal under–20, under–25 and B–teams. He also played for the Northern Free State under–20 team and in 1983 he joined the rugby club of Stellenbosch University. In his first match for Maties he formed the front row with Hempies du Toit and Shaun Povey, both Springboks. Strauss made his senior provincial debut for Western Province in 1983.

He made his test debut for the Springboks against the visiting South American Jaguars team on 20 October 1984 at Loftus Versveld in Pretoria.

=== Test history ===
No.	Opponents	Results (RSA 1st)	Position	Points	Dates	Venue
1.	South American Jaguars	32–15	Tighthead prop		20 Oct 1984	Loftus Versfeld, Pretoria
2.	South American Jaguars	22–13	Tighthead prop		27 Oct 1984	Newlands, Cape Town

== See also ==
- List of South Africa national rugby union players – Springbok no. 539
