= Steve Hoffman (rugby union) =

South African rugby union player

- Full name: Richard Stephanus Hoffman
- Born: 2 December 1931 Parow, South Africa
- Died: 15 May 1986 (aged 54)

Rugby union career
- Position: Wing three–quarter
Provincial / State sides
Years	Team	Apps	(Points)
- Boland
International career
Years	Team	Apps	(Points)
1953	South Africa	1	(0)

Richard Stephanus Hoffman (2 December 1931 – 15 May 1986) was a South African international rugby union player.

Hoffman was born in the Cape Town suburb of Parow.

A Worcester–based wing three–quarter, Hoffman represented Boland and gained his Springboks call up in 1953. He was one of six changes made to the team for the third Test match against the Wallabies at Durban, taking the place of Chum Ochse on the left wing. The Springboks won the match 18–8 and Hoffman was credited with a try saving tackle on Wallaby Garth Jones. He was nonetheless dropped for the series finale when Ochse made a return.

== See also ==
- List of South Africa national rugby union players
