= James Starke =

South African rugby union player

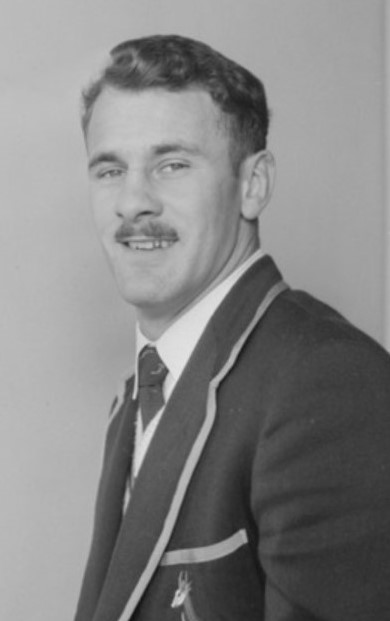
- Starke in New Zealand in 1956
- Born: Jacobus Joubert Starke; 16 May 1931 Durbanville, Cape Province
- Died: 25 July 2018 (aged 87) Stellenbosch, Western Cape
- Height: 1.86 m (6 ft 1 in)
- Weight: 90 kg (198 lb)
- School: Rondebosch Boys' High School
- University: Stellenbosch University

Rugby union career
- Position: Loose-forward
Amateur team(s)
Years	Team	Apps	(Points)
1949–1965	Maties		
Provincial / State sides
Years	Team	Apps	(Points)
1954–1961	Western Province		
International career
Years	Team	Apps	(Points)
1956	South Africa	1	(0)
1956	South Africa (tour)	7	(3)

Jacobus Joubert "James" Starke (15 May 1931 – 25 July 2018) was a South African rugby union player.

== Rugby union career ==
Starke finished his schooling at Rondebosch Boys' High School and in 1949 started at Stellenbosch University. He first played for the Maties under-19 team and from 1951 for the first team. He captained the club from 1953 to 1965 and also captained the Maties at cricket in 1951.

In 1954 he made his provincial debut for Western Province and played for the union until 1961, captaining the province once. He also captained the Southern Universities on tours to Rhodesia and Europe.

In 1956, Starke was called up as a replacement to the Springbok team that toured New Zealand, after the team suffered many injuries. Starke played in seven tour matches as well as the fourth test match against the All Blacks at Eden Park in Auckland.

In 1958, Starke went to the University of Pennsylvania in Philadelphia to study there for a year and a half. After retiring from rugby, he remained involved in rugby in Stellenbosch and in the Western Province, where he became selector and chairman of selectors.

=== Test history ===
No.	Opponents	Results (SA 1st)	Position	Tries	Dates	Venue
1.	New Zealand	5–11	Flank		1 Sep 1956	Eden Park, Auckland

== See also ==
- List of South Africa national rugby union players – Springbok no. 336
