= Noel Howe-Browne =

South African rugby union player

- Born: 24 December 1884
- Died: 3 April 1943 (aged 58) Morogoro, Tanganyika
- School: Diocesan College
- University: Oriel College, Oxford
- Occupation: Barrister

Rugby union career
- Position: Forward
International career
Years	Team	Apps	(Points)
1910	South Africa	3	(0)

Noel Richard Frank George Howe-Browne (24 December 1884 – 3 April 1943) was a South African barrister and international rugby union player.

Howe-Browne attended Cape Town's Diocesan College and went to Oriel College, Oxford, as a 1904 Rhodes Scholar. A two-time Oxford blue, Howe-Browne was capped as a forward for Springboks in 1910, playing three international matches against the touring British Lions. He later served on the Tanganyika Legislative Council.

== See also ==
- List of South Africa national rugby union players
