= Piet Veldsman =

South African rugby union footballer

- Born: Pieter Eden Veldsman; 11 March 1952 (age 74) George, Western Cape, South Africa
- Height: 1.83 m (6 ft 0 in)
- Weight: 95 kg (209 lb)
- School: Tygerberg High School, Parow, Cape Town
- University: Stellenbosch University

Rugby union career
- Position: Loose-forward
Amateur team(s)
| Years | Team | Apps | (Points) |
| 1970–1972 | Maties | | |
| 1973–1980 | Bellville RFU | | |
Provincial / State sides
| Years | Team | Apps | (Points) |
| 1976–1979 | Western Province | | |
International career
| Years | Team | Apps | (Points) |
| 1977 | South Africa | 1 | |

Pieter Eden Veldsman (born 11 March 1952) is a former South African rugby union player.

== Playing career ==
In 1969 and during his final year at school, Veldsman was selected to represent the Western Province schools team at the annual Craven Week tournament that was held in Pietermaritzburg. During the early seventies Veldsman played for the Western Province under–20 side and he made his senior provincial debut for Western Province in 1976.

Veldsman made his test match debut, which was also his only test for the Springboks, on 27 August 1977 against the World XV team at Loftus Versfeld in Pretoria. Along with Veldsman, there were seven other debutants in the 1977 test match, of whom five also played in only one test match for the Springboks.

=== Test history ===
| No. | Opposition | Result (SA 1st) | Position | Tries | Date | Venue |
|---|---|---|---|---|---|---|
| 1. | World XV | 45–24 | Loose-forward | | 27 August 1977 | Loftus Versfeld, Pretoria |

== See also ==
- List of South Africa national rugby union players – Springbok no. 497
