= Boet Mulder =

South African rugby union player

- Full name: Christoffel Gerhardus Mulder
- Born: 21 May 1939 Springs, South Africa
- Died: 7 October 2023 (aged 84)

Rugby union career
- Position: Fullback
Provincial / State sides
Years	Team	Apps	(Points)
- Eastern Transvaal
International career
Years	Team	Apps	(Points)
1965	South Africa		

Christoffel Gerhardus Mulder (21 May 1939 – 7 October 2023) was a South African international rugby union player.

Mulder was born in Springs and educated at Hoërskool Hugenote.

An Eastern Transvaal fullback, Mulder was a member of the Springboks squad for the 1965 tour of Australia and New Zealand. He gained selection in part due to his skills in wet weather, deemed likely to be prevalent in New Zealand, and was also a back up goal–kicker. His tour consisted of 11 fixtures, but no Test matches.

Mulder was an uncle of 1995 Rugby World Cup–winning Springboks centre Japie Mulder.

== See also ==
- List of South Africa national rugby union players
