= Kerneels Cronjé =

South African rugby union player

- Full name: Cornelis Johannes Claassen Cronjé
- Born: 16 April 1940 Warden, South Africa
- Died: 13 May 2009 (aged 69)

Rugby union career
- Position: Wing three–quarter
Provincial / State sides
Years	Team	Apps	(Points)
- Eastern Transvaal
International career
Years	Team	Apps	(Points)
1965	South Africa		

Cornelis Johannes Claassen Cronjé (16 April 1940 – 13 May 2009), known as Kerneels Cronjé, was a South African international rugby union player.

Cronjé was a national 220 yard hurdles champion and missed the 1960 Olympics due to injury.

An Eastern Transvaal wing three–quarter, Cronjé also had his international rugby career curtailed by injury. He was a member of the Springboks squad for the 1965 tour of Australia and New Zealand, which for Cronjé consisted of a single practice match against Western Australia "B", before he had to fly home with a leg injury.

Cronjé had a younger brother Beyers who represented Orange Free State.

== See also ==
- List of South Africa national rugby union players
