= Henry Gorton =

South African rugby union player (b. 1872, d. 1950)

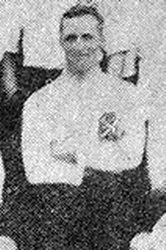
- Born: Henry Corbett Gorton; 28 October 1871 Burton-on-Trent, England
- Died: 10 January 1900 (aged 28)
- School: Burton Grammar School

Rugby union career
- Position: Forward
Provincial / State sides
Years	Team	Apps	(Points)
1896	Transvaal	0	(0)
International career
Years	Team	Apps	(Points)
1896	South Africa	1	(0)
- Correct as of 27 May 2019

Henry Gorton (28 October 1871 – 10 January 1900) was an English born South African international rugby union player who played as a forward.

He made 1 appearance for South Africa against the British Lions in 1896.
