= Jack Hartley =

South African rugby union player

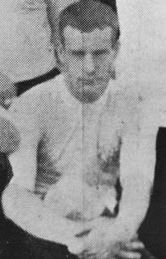
- Born: Arthur James Hartley; 18 August 1873 Krugersdorp, South African Republic
- Died: 15 May 1923 (aged 49)
- School: Bishops

Rugby union career
- Position: Wing
Provincial / State sides
Years	Team	Apps	(Points)
	Western Province	0	(0)
International career
Years	Team	Apps	(Points)
1891	South Africa	1	(0)
- Correct as of 19 July 2010

Jack Hartley also known as Arthur James Hartley (18 August 1873 – 15 May 1923) was a South African international rugby union player who played as a wing.

He made his only international appearance for South Africa in their Test—against the British Isles. He remains the youngest ever player to represent South Africa at international level.
