= Scraps Wessels =

South African rugby union player (b. 1874, d. 1929)

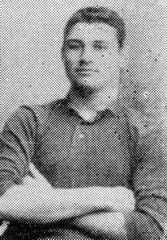
- Born: Johannes Jacobus Wessels; 13 September 1874 Boshof, South Africa
- Died: 6 April 1929 (aged 55)
- School: SACS

Rugby union career
- Position: Forward
Provincial / State sides
Years	Team	Apps	(Points)
1896	Western Province	0	(0)
International career
Years	Team	Apps	(Points)
1896	South Africa	3	(0)
- Correct as of 27 May 2019

Scraps Wessels (13 September 1871 – 6 April 1929) was a South African international rugby union player who played as a forward.

He made 3 appearances for South Africa against the British Lions in 1896.
