= Dirk de Vos (rugby union) =

South African rugby union player

- Full name: Dirk Johannes Jacobus de Vos
- Born: 8 April 1941 Kroonstad, South Africa
- Died: 12 February 2011 (aged 69) Potchefstroom, South Africa
- Height: 1.77 m (5 ft 10 in)
- Weight: 76.6 kg (169 lb)

Rugby union career
- Position: Scrum–half
International career
Years	Team	Apps	(Points)
1965–69	South Africa	3	(0)

Dirk Johannes Jacobus de Vos (8 April 1941 – 12 February 2011) was a South African international rugby union player.

Born in Kroonstad, de Vos was the son of a Graeme College dominee and attended the same institution growing up in Grahamstown. He was one of the most successful rugby players produced by Graeme College.

A scrum–half, de Vos received three Test caps for the Springboks, including matches against Scotland on away tours in 1965 and 1969. His other appearance came in a win over the Wallabies at Newlands in 1969, when he deputised for captain Dawie de Villiers. He also toured Australia with the Springboks in 1971, acting as back up to Joggie Viljoen, who was preferred for the Test matches. In a well travelled career, de Vos represented Western Province, Orange Free State, Transvaal, Western Transavaal and Northern Transvaal.

== See also ==
- List of South Africa national rugby union players
