= Jack Jackson (rugby union) =

South African rugby union player (b. 1878, d. 1954)

- Born: John Scafe Jackson; 1 October 1878 Victoria West, Cape Colony
- Died: 30 June 1954 (aged 75)
- School: SACS

Rugby union career
- Position: Forward
Provincial / State sides
| Years | Team | Apps | (Points) |
- Western Province
International career
| Years | Team | Apps | (Points) |
| 1903 | South Africa | 1 | (0) |
- Correct as of 3 June 2019

John Scafe Jackson (1 October 1878 – 30 June 1954) was a South African international rugby union player who played as a forward.

He made one appearance for South Africa in 1903.
