= Long George Devenish =

South African rugby union player (b. 1871, d. 1943)

- Born: George St Leger Devenish; 11 May 1871 Riversdale, Cape Colony
- Died: 1 February 1943 (aged 71)
- School: Bishops

Rugby union career
- Position: Halfback
Provincial / State sides
| Years | Team | Apps | (Points) |
| 1896 | Transvaal | 0 | (0) |
International career
| Years | Team | Apps | (Points) |
| 1896 | South Africa | 1 | (0) |
- Correct as of 27 May 2019

Long George Devenish (11 May 1871 – 1 February 1943) was a South African international rugby union player who played as a halfback.

He made 1 appearance for South Africa against the British Lions in 1896.
