= Paul Scott (rugby union) =

South African rugby union player (b. 1872, d. 1950)

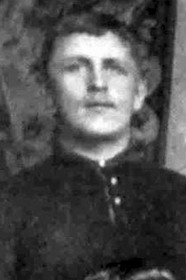
- Born: Paul Alexander Scott; 26 October 1872 New Brunswick, Canada
- Died: 1 January 1950 (aged 77)
- School: Bishops

Rugby union career
- Position: Forward
Provincial / State sides
Years	Team	Apps	(Points)
1896	Transvaal	0	(0)
International career
Years	Team	Apps	(Points)
1896	South Africa	4	(0)
- Correct as of 27 May 2019

Paul Scott (26 October 1872 – 1950) was a South African international rugby union player who played as a forward.

He made 4 appearances for South Africa against the British Lions in 1896.
