= Bertie Gibbs =

South African rugby union player (b. 1878, d. 1952)

- Born: Egbert Albert Hornsby Gibbs; 25 August 1878 Kimberly, Cape Colony
- Died: 29 December 1952 (aged 74)
- School: Bishops

Rugby union career
- Position: Wing
Provincial / State sides
| Years | Team | Apps | (Points) |
- Griquas
International career
| Years | Team | Apps | (Points) |
| 1903 - 1906 | South Africa | 1 | (0) |
- Correct as of 3 June 2019

Bertie Gibbs (25 August 1878 – 29 December 1952) was a South African international rugby union player who played as a wing.

He made 1 appearance for South Africa in 1903.
