= George Crampton =

South African rugby union player (b. 1875, d. 1946)

- Born: George Fiennes Twistleton Crampton; 30 March 1875 Aughrim, Ireland
- Died: 27 December 1946 (aged 71)
- School: Bedford School

Rugby union career
- Position: Forward
Provincial / State sides
Years	Team	Apps	(Points)
- Griquas
International career
Years	Team	Apps	(Points)
1903	South Africa	1	(0)
- Correct as of 3 June 2019

George Crampton (30 March 1875 – 27 December 1946) was a South African international rugby union player who played as a forward.

He made 1 appearance for South Africa in 1903.
