= Alf Larard =

South Africa international rugby union & league footballer

- Born: Arthur Larard; 30 December 1870 Hull, England
- Died: 15 August 1936 (aged 65) Kerrier, Cornwall, England

Rugby union career
- Position: Half back
International career
Years	Team	Apps	(Points)
1896	South Africa	2	(3)
- Rugby league career

Playing information
- Position: Centre, Halfback
Club
Years	Team	Pld	T	G	FG	P
1901–1905	Huddersfield	99				42
Representative
Years	Team	Pld	T	G	FG	P
1901	Yorkshire	2				0

Arthur Larard (30 December 1870 – 15 August 1936), also known by the nickname of "Alf", was a South African international rugby union and rugby league footballer. He primarily played as a half back, but also played many games at centre during his rugby league career.

== Rugby union career ==
In 1888, aged 17, Larard moved to South Africa, where he played rugby union throughout the 1890s. In 1896, he was selected to play for South Africa against the touring British Lions. He débuted in the second Test on 22 August 1896 in Johannesburg, and were defeated by the Lions 7–18. His second appearance came in the final game of the series on 5 September 1896 in Cape Town, with Larard scoring the only try in a 5–0 win for South Africa – the country's first ever victory in international rugby.

== Rugby league career ==
In 1901, Larard returned to England. He went on to play four seasons in the Northern Union with Huddersfield, appearing 99 times and scoring 14 tries. He was also capped twice by Yorkshire.
