= Pieter Dormehl =

South African rugby union player (b. 1872, d. 1958)

- Born: Pieter Joseph Dormehl; 4 November 1872 Cape Town, South Africa
- Died: 1 September 1958 (aged 85)
- School: Wynberg

Rugby union career
- Position: Forward
Provincial / State sides
Years	Team	Apps	(Points)
	Western Province	0	(0)
International career
Years	Team	Apps	(Points)
1896	South Africa	2	(0)
- Correct as of 27 May 2019

Pieter Dormehl (4 November 1872 – 1 September 1958) was a South African international rugby union player who played as a forward.

He made 2 appearances for South Africa against the British Lions in 1896.
