= PJ Meyer =

South African rugby union player (b. 1873, d. 1919)

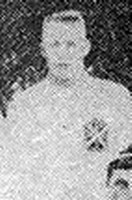
- Born: Philip John Meyer; 15 May 1873
- Died: 27 July 1919 (aged 46)

Rugby union career
- Position: Forward
Provincial / State sides
| Years | Team | Apps | (Points) |
| 1896 | Griquas | 0 | (0) |
International career
| Years | Team | Apps | (Points) |
| 1896 | South Africa | 1 | (0) |
- Correct as of 27 May 2019

PJ Meyer (15 May 1873 – 27 July 1919) was a South African international rugby union player who played as a forward.

He made 1 appearance for South Africa against the British Lions in 1896.
