= IB de Villiers =

South Africa rugby union player

- Full name: Isaac Benjamin de Villiers
- Born: March 10, 1892 Johannesburg, South African Republic
- Died: January 9, 1966 (aged 73) Johannesburg, South Africa

Rugby union career
- Position: Full-back
Provincial / State sides
Years	Team	Apps	(Points)
- Transvaal
International career
Years	Team	Apps	(Points)
1921	South Africa	1 (not recognised as an official test cap)	(Two Conversions)

Isaac Benjamin de Villiers (10 March 1892 – 9 January 1966) was a South African rugby player. He played as full-back. He was more commonly known as "IB".

== Career ==
De Villiers played rugby for Transvaal and was selected from the Australian tour in 1921. He made his International South Africa debut on 27 June 1921, on the Royal Agricultural Showground in Sydney, Australia playing fullback. This was a game between the Springboks and an Australian XV. He converted two tries score that day. The springboks won 16-11.

== Personal life ==
De Villiers was born was born in Johannesburg, South African Republic, to Isaac, a farmer and Francina Hofmeyr. He was one of 2 children. He worked as transport officer and married Gertruida van Heerden in 1913. He had two children with her.

He died on 9 September 1966, in Johannesburg, South Africa
