= Mauritz van den Berg =

South African rugby union player

- Born: Mauritz Albertus van den Berg; 9 May 1909 Pretoria, Transvaal Colony
- Died: 9 April 1948 (aged 38) Cape Town, South Africa
- School: Glenwood High School, Durban

Rugby union career
- Position: Lock
Amateur team(s)
Years	Team	Apps	(Points)
- Gardens RFC
Provincial / State sides
Years	Team	Apps	(Points)
1932–1940	Western Province		
International career
Years	Team	Apps	(Points)
1937	South Africa	4	(0)
1937	South Africa (tour)	14	(15)

Mauritz Albertus van den Berg (9 May 1909 – 9 April 1948) was a South African rugby union player.

== Playing career ==
Van den Berg played provincial rugby for the Western Province in the South African Currie Cup competition. He was a member of the 1937 Springbok touring team to Australia and New Zealand and played his first test matches for South Africa on 26 June 1937 against the Wallabies at the Sydney Cricket Ground. He then played all three test matches in the test series victory against New Zealand.

== See also ==
- List of South Africa national rugby union players – Springbok no. 258
