= Dykie Lyons =

South African rugby union player (1873–1921)

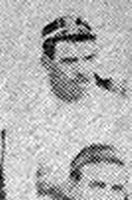
- Born: Dominic Joseph Lyons; 3 August 1873 Durban, Colony of Natal
- Died: 1 May 1921 (aged 47)
- School: St Aidan's College, Grahamstown

Rugby union career
- Position: Fullback
Provincial / State sides
Years	Team	Apps	(Points)
	Eastern Province	0	(0)
International career
Years	Team	Apps	(Points)
1896	South Africa	1	(0)
- Correct as of 19 July 2010

Dominic Joseph "Dykie" Lyons (3 August 1873 – 1 May 1921) was a South African international rugby union player who played as a fullback.
