= Ernest Olver =

South African rugby union player

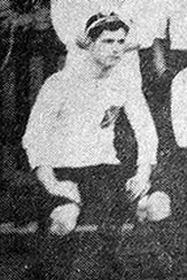
- Born: Ernest Olver; 27 July 1874 Liskeard, Cornwall, United Kingdom
- Died: 12 June 1943 (aged 68)

Rugby union career
- Position: Wing
Provincial / State sides
Years	Team	Apps	(Points)
	Eastern Province	0	(0)
International career
Years	Team	Apps	(Points)
1896	South Africa	1	(0)
- Correct as of 19 July 2010

Ernest Olver (27 July 1874 – 12 June 1943) was an English born South African international rugby union player who played as a wing. Olver became the 33rd capped Springbok player when he was a member of the Springboks team to play against the British Isles in Port Elizabeth on 30 July 1896.
