= Francis Myburg =

South African rugby union player (b. 1871, d. 1929)

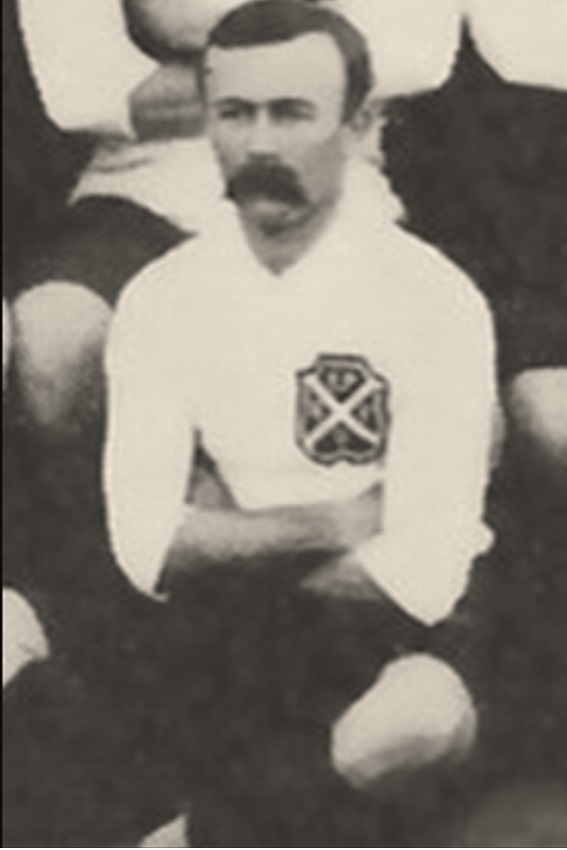
- Born: Francis Rudolph; 20 July 1871 Cape Town, South Africa
- Died: 30 November 1929 (aged 58)
- School: Bishops

Rugby union career
- Position: Halfback
Provincial / State sides
| Years | Team | Apps | (Points) |
| 1896 | Western Province | 0 | (0) |
International career
| Years | Team | Apps | (Points) |
| 1896 | South Africa | 1 | (0) |
- Correct as of 27 May 2019

Francis Myburg (20 July 1871 – 30 November 1929) was a Cape Colony international rugby union player who played as a halfback.

He made 1 appearance for South Africa against the British Lions in 1896.
