= Danie Theunissen =

South African rugby union player (b. 1869, d. 1964)

- Born: Daniël Johannes Theunissen; 12 July 1869 Somerset West, Cape Colony
- Died: 19 March 1964 (aged 94)
- School: Hottentots Holland High School

Rugby union career
- Position: Forward
Provincial / State sides
Years	Team	Apps	(Points)
1896	Griquas	0	(0)
International career
Years	Team	Apps	(Points)
1896	South Africa	1	(0)
- Correct as of 27 May 2019

Danie Theunissen (12 July 1869 – 19 Mar 1964) was a South African international rugby union player who played as a forward.

He made 1 appearance for South Africa against the British Lions in 1896.
