= Spanner Forbes =

South African rugby union player (b. 1873, d. 1955)

- Born: Hamish Hood Forbes; 2 January 1873 Ararat, Victoria, Australia
- Died: 17 September 1955 (aged 82)
- School: George Watson's College

Rugby union career
- Position: Centre
Provincial / State sides
Years	Team	Apps	(Points)
1896	Transvaal	0	(0)
International career
Years	Team	Apps	(Points)
1896	South Africa	1	(0)
- Correct as of 27 May 2019

Spanner Forbes (2 January 1873 – 17 September 1955) was a South African international rugby union player who played as a centre.

He made 1 appearance for South Africa against the British Lions in 1896.
