= Tommy Etlinger =

South African rugby union player (b. 1872, d. 1953)

- Born: Thomas Edmund Etlinger; 7 September 1872 London, England
- Died: 23 February 1953 (aged 80)
- School: Marlborough College

Rugby union career
- Position: Halfback
Provincial / State sides
Years	Team	Apps	(Points)
1896	Western Province	0	(0)
International career
Years	Team	Apps	(Points)
1896	South Africa	1	(0)
- Correct as of 27 May 2019

Thomas Edmund Etlinger (7 September 1872 – 23 February 1953) was a South African international rugby union player who played as a Halfback.

He made 1 appearance for South Africa against the British Lions in 1896.
