= Gerrie Sonnekus =

South African rugby union footballer

- Born: Gerhardus Hermanus Hendrikus Sonnekus; 1 February 1953 (age 73) Senekal, Free State
- Height: 1.80 m (5 ft 11 in)
- Weight: 86 kg (190 lb)
- School: Welkom-Gimnasium, Welkom
- University: University of the Free State

Rugby union career
Amateur team(s)
Years	Team	Apps	(Points)
- Shimlas
Provincial / State sides
Years	Team	Apps	(Points)
1974–1985	Free State	160	(276)
International career
Years	Team	Apps	(Points)
1974, 1984	South Africa	3	(4)

Gerhardus Hermanus Hendrikus 'Gerrie' Sonnekus (born 1 February 1953) is a former South African rugby union player.

== Playing career ==
Sonnekus finished his schooling in Welkom and studied at the University of the Free State. He played his first provincial match for the Free State in 1974 and continued to represent the union until 1985. During his career with the Free State he played in five Currie Cup finals, being on the losing side in 1975, 1977, 1978 and 1981. In 1976 he was a member of the Free State team that won the Currie Cup final against Western Province and gained his winners medal when he went on as a replacement for Eben Jansen during the match. With his retirement at the end of the 1985 season, Sonnekus was the Free State record holder for most matches of 160, most matches as captain of 63, most tries of 69 and most Currie Cup matches of 104.

Sonnekus played three test matches for the Springboks. His first test was the third tests in the series against the 1974 Lions team captained by Willie John McBride, played at the Boet Erasmus Stadium in Port Elizabeth, when he was selected as scrumhalf. His second test match was almost ten years later, once again at the Boet Erasmus Stadium, this time as number 8 against England. He then played in the second test against the English, at Ellis Park and scores his first test try during the match.

=== Test history ===
No.	Opposition	Result (SA 1st)	Position	Tries	Date	Venue
1.	British Lions	9–26	Scrumhalf		13 July 1974	Boet Erasmus Stadium, Port Elizabeth
2.	England	33–15	Number 8		2 June 1984	Boet Erasmus Stadium, Port Elizabeth
3.	England	35–9	Number 8	1	9 June 1984	Ellis Park Stadium, Johannesburg

== Accolades ==
Sonnekus was one of the five nominees for 1985 SA Rugby player of the Year award. The other nominees for the award were Jannie Breedt, Schalk Burger Snr., Danie Gerber and the eventual winner of the award, Naas Botha.

== See also ==
- List of South Africa national rugby union players – Springbok no. 473
