= Jan Schlebusch =

South African rugby union footballer

- Born: Jan Johannes Jacobus Schlebusch; 5 May 1949 (age 77) Kroonstad, Free State
- Height: 1.85 m (6 ft 1 in)
- Weight: 86 kg (190 lb)
- School: Afrikaans Hoër Kroonstad
- University: University of the Free State

Rugby union career
Provincial / State sides
Years	Team	Apps	(Points)
1973–1978	Free State		
International career
Years	Team	Apps	(Points)
1974–1975	South Africa	3	

Jan Johannes Jacobus Schlebusch (born 5 May 1949) is a former South African rugby union player.

== Playing career ==
Schlebusch finished his schooling in Kroonstad, studied at the University of the Free State and became a teacher at Grey College, in Bloemfontein. He played provincial rugby for the Free State and played in the Currie Cup finals of 1973, 1975, 1977 and 1978.

Schlebusch played three test matches for the Springboks. His first test was the third tests in the series against the 1974 Lions team captained by Willie John McBride, played at the Boet Erasmus Stadium in Port Elizabeth. He then played in the fourth test against the Lions at Ellis Park, that ended in a 13–all draw between the teams. His third and final test match was in 1975 against France at Loftus Versfeld in Pretoria.

=== Test history ===
No.	Opposition	Result (SA 1st)	Position	Tries	Date	Venue
1.	British Lions	9–26	Centre		13 July 1974	Boet Erasmus Stadium, Port Elizabeth
2.	(British & Irish Lions) British Lions	13–13	Centre		27 July 1974	Ellis Park, Johannesburg
3.	France	33–18	Centre		28 June 1975	Loftus Versfeld, Pretoria

== See also ==
- List of South Africa national rugby union players – Springbok no. 472
