= Christo Wagenaar =

South African rugby union footballer

- Born: Christo Wagenaar; 11 March 1952 (age 74) Krugersdorp, Gauteng
- Height: 1.88 m (6 ft 2 in)
- Weight: 85 kg (187 lb)
- School: Monument High School, Krugersdorp
- University: University of Pretoria

Rugby union career
Provincial / State sides
Years	Team	Apps	(Points)
- Northern Transvaal
International career
Years	Team	Apps	(Points)
1977	South Africa	1	

Christo Wagenaar (born 11 March 1952 in Krugersdorp, Gauteng, South Africa) is a former South African rugby union player.

== Playing career ==
Wagenaar played for Northern Transvaal in the South African provincial competitions. He was part of the Northern Transvaal team that won the Currie Cup in 1975, 1977, 1978 and 1981. Wagenaar played in only one test for the Springboks which was against the World XV on 27 August 1977 at Loftus Versfeld in Pretoria.

=== Test history ===
No.	Opposition	Result (SA 1st)	Position	Tries	Date	Venue
1.	World XV	45–24	Centre		27 August 1977	Loftus Versfeld, Pretoria

== Accolades ==
Wagenaar was one of the five Young Players of the Year in 1975, along with Tommy du Plessis, Hermanus Potgieter, De Wet Ras and Corrie Pypers

== See also ==
- List of South Africa national rugby union players – Springbok no. 491
