= Klippies Kritzinger =

South African rugby union footballer

- Born: Johannes Lodewyk Kritzinger; 1 March 1948 Harrismith, Free State
- Died: 18 February 2016 (aged 67) Centurion, Gauteng
- Height: 1.90 m (6 ft 3 in)
- Weight: 114 kg (251 lb)
- School: Harrismith High School

Rugby union career
- Position: Loose forward
Provincial / State sides
Years	Team	Apps	(Points)
1971–1973	Natal		
1974	Transvaal		
1975–1976	Free State		
- Northern Free State
- Western Transvaal
International career
Years	Team	Apps	(Points)
1974–1976	South Africa	12	(5)

Johannes Lodewyk 'Klippies' Kritzinger (1 March 1948 – 18 February 2016) was a South African rugby union player.

== Playing career ==
As a schoolboy Kritzinger represented the Free State at the 1967 Craven Week tournament. He made his provincial debut for Natal in 1971 and also played provincial rugby for Transvaal, the Free State, Northern Free State and Western Transvaal. Kritzinger joined the Free State in 1975 and was appointed as captain, after which he captained his team to the 1975 Currie Cup final. In 1976, although he was no longer captain, he was a member of the team that won the Currie Cup.

In 1972, Kritzinger toured with the Gazelles, a South African under–24 team, to Argentina. He played in eleven of the thirteen matches on tour and scored three tries. His first test match for the Springboks was as eighthman in the third test against the 1974 Lions at the Boet Erasmus Stadium in Port Elizabeth. He then toured with the Springboks to France at the end of 1974, playing in both test matches and in 1975 he also played in both tests against France during their return tour of South Africa. His last test match was the fourth test against the All Blacks in 1976. Kritzinger played seven tests, scoring one try and also five tour matches for South Africa.

=== Test history ===
No.	Opposition	Result (SA 1st)	Position	Tries	Date	Venue
1.	British Lions	9–26	Number 8		13 July 1974	Boet Erasmus Stadium, Port Elizabeth
2.	(British & Irish Lions) British Lions	13–13	Flank		27 July 1974	Ellis Park, Johannesburg
3.	France	13–4	Flank		23 November 1974	Le stade de Toulouse, Toulouse
4.	France	10–8	Flank		30 November 1974	Parc des Princes, Paris
5.	France	38–25	Flank		21 June 1975	Free State Stadium, Bloemfontein
6.	France	33–18	Flank		28 June 1975	Loftus Versfeld, Pretoria
7.	New Zealand	15–14	Flank	1	18 September 1976	Ellis Park, Johannesburg

== See also ==
- List of South Africa national rugby union players – Springbok no. 477
