= Niek Bezuidenhout =

South African rugby union footballer

Nic Bezuidenhout
- Born: Nicolaas Stephanus Erasmus Bezuidenhout; 4 August 1950 (age 76) Delmas, Mpumalanga
- Height: 1.85 m (6 ft 1 in)
- Weight: 107 kg (236 lb)
- School: Hoërskool Delmas
- University: University of Pretoria

Rugby union career
Provincial / State sides
Years	Team	Apps	(Points)
- Northern Transvaal
International career
Years	Team	Apps	(Points)
1972–1977	South Africa	9	

Nicolaas Stephanus Erasmus 'Nic' Bezuidenhout (born 4 August 1950) is a former South African rugby union player.

== Playing career ==
Bezuidenhout played senior provincial rugby in South Africa for Northern Transvaal. In 1972, he toured with the South African Gazelles, a South African under-24 team, to Argentina.

Bezuidenhout made his test debut in 1972 at Ellis Park against the touring English side captained by John Pullin. During 1974, he played in three tests against the British Lions and two tests during South Africa's tour of France. Bezuidenhout played a further two tests against France and his final test was in 1977 against the World XV. Bezuidenhout played nine test matches and four tour matches for the Springboks.

=== Test history ===
No.	Opponents	Results (RSA 1st)	Position	Tries	Dates	Venue
1.	England	9–18	Prop		3 June 1972	Ellis Park, Johannesburg
2.	British Lions	9–28	Prop		22 June 1974	Loftus Versfeld, Pretoria
3.	(British & Irish Lions) British Lions	9–26	Prop		13 July 1974	Boet Erasmus Stadium, Port Elizabeth
4.	(British & Irish Lions) British Lions	13–13	Prop		27 July 1974	Ellis Park, Johannesburg
5.	France	13–4	Prop		23 November 1974	Le stade de Toulouse, Toulouse
6.	France	10–8	Prop		30 November 1974	Parc des Princes, Paris
7.	France	38–25	Prop		21 Jun 1975	Free State Stadium, Bloemfontein
8.	France	33–18	Prop		28 Jun 1975	Loftus Versfeld, Pretoria
9.	World XV	45–24	Prop		27 Aug 1977	Loftus Versfeld, Pretoria

== See also ==
- List of South Africa national rugby union players – Springbok no. 457
