= Leon Vogel =

South African rugby union footballer

- Born: Martin Leon Vogel; 22 October 1949 (age 77) Aliwal North, Eastern Cape
- Height: 1.85 m (6 ft 1 in)
- Weight: 85 kg (187 lb)
- School: Aliwal North High School

Rugby union career
Provincial / State sides
Years	Team	Apps	(Points)
- Free State
International career
Years	Team	Apps	(Points)
1974	South Africa	1	

Martin Leon Vogel (born 22 October 1949) is a former South African rugby union player.

== Playing career ==
Vogel played provincial rugby for the Free State. His only appearance in a test match was as a replacement in the second test against the 1974 touring Lions team of Willie John McBride at the Loftus Versfeld in Pretoria. Vogel replaced Dawie Snyman after 35 minutes in the second half, after Snyman himself replaced Ian McCallum 6 minutes earlier. Vogel played centre for the last five minutes of the test, with the starting centre, Jackie Snyman, moving to fullback.

=== Test history ===
No.	Opposition	Result (SA 1st)	Position	Tries	Date	Venue
1.	British Lions	9–28	Replacement		22 June 1974	Loftus Versfeld, Pretoria

== See also ==
- List of South Africa national rugby union players – Springbok no. 471
