= Jackie Snyman =

South African rugby union footballer

- Born: Jacobus Cornelius Pauw Snyman; 14 April 1948 (age 78) Johannesburg, South Africa
- Height: 1.77 m (5 ft 10 in)
- Weight: 77 kg (170 lb)
- School: Grey College, Bloemfontein
- University: Stellenbosch University
- Notable relative(s): Dawie Snyman (brother), Dawie Snyman (son)

Rugby union career
Amateur team(s)
Years	Team	Apps	(Points)
- Maties
Provincial / State sides
Years	Team	Apps	(Points)
1972–1976	Free State		
1976–1977	Northern Transvaal		
International career
Years	Team	Apps	(Points)
1974	South Africa	3	(18)

Jacobus Cornelius Pauw 'Jackie' Snyman (born 14 April 1948) is a former South African rugby union player and coach.

== Playing career ==
A product of Grey College in Bloemfontein, Snyman attended Stellenbosch University for a degree in physical education. He made his provincial debut for the Free State in 1972 and during September to November 1972, Snyman toured with the Gazelles, a South African under-23 team, to Argentina. Snyman scored 110 points during the tour, the most by a Gazelles player. In 1973, Snyman was a member of the Free State team that played in the Currie Cup final against Northern Transvaal. He scored 14 point for the Free State in their 22–30 loss.

Snyman's test debut for the Springboks was during the 1974 British Lions tour of South Africa in the second test at Loftus Versfeld in Pretoria. He also played in the third and fourth test matches against the Lions and toured with the Springboks to France at the end of 1974. Snyman played three test matches for the Springboks, scoring 18 points. He also played in four tour matches, scoring eleven points.

=== Test history ===
No.	Opponents	Results (SA 1st)	Position	Points	Dates	Venue
1.	British Lions	9–28	Centre		22 Jun 1974	Loftus Versfeld, Pretoria
2.	(British & Irish Lions) British Lions	9–26	Flyhalf	9 (3 penalties)	13 Jul 1974	Boet Erasmus Stadium, Port Elizabeth
3.	(British & Irish Lions) British Lions	13–13	Flyhalf	9 (3 penalties)	27 Jul 1974	Ellis Park, Johannesburg

== Accolades ==
In 1972, Snyman was one of the five Young Players of the Year, along with Paul Bayvel, Pikkie du Toit, Dugald MacDonald and Gerald Bosch.

== See also ==
- List of South Africa national rugby union players – Springbok no. 466
