= André van Staden =

South African rugby union footballer

- Born: Jacobus Adriaan van Staden; 15 December 1946 (age 79) Brakpan, Gauteng
- Height: 1.82 m (6 ft 0 in)
- Weight: 80 kg (176 lb)
- School: Nylstroom Hoërskool

Rugby union career
Provincial / State sides
Years	Team	Apps	(Points)
- Northern Transvaal
International career
Years	Team	Apps	(Points)
1974	South Africa (tour)	454	(0)

Jacobus Adriaan 'André' van Staden (born 15 December 1946) is a former South African rugby union player.

== Playing career ==
Van Staden played his provincial rugby for Northern Transvaal and was a member of the Currie Cup winning teams in 1969, 1973 and 1974. He was also in the team that drew the final with Transvaal in 1971.

In 1974, Van Staden was selected to tour with the Springboks to France. He did not play in any test matches but played in three tour matches for the Springboks.

== See also ==
- List of South Africa national rugby union players – Springbok no. 483
