= 1972 South African Gazelles rugby union tour in Argentina =

- Date: Sep–Nov 1972
Summary
P	W	D	L
Total
13	11	1	1
Test match
2	1	0	1
Opponent
P	W	D	L
Argentina
2	1	0	1

The 1972 South African Gazelles rugby union tour in Argentina was a series of matches played by the Gazelles (Under-24 South African selection) in Argentina, between September and November 1972.

It was the second tour of Argentina by this selection, after the 1966 tour and the fourth of a South African team.

The series between "Gazelles" and "Pumas" (Argentina national team) was tied with a victory for both. In fact, the second test played on 4 November was the first victory ever of a national team over a South African side.

== Match summary ==
Complete list of matches played by the South Africa u24 in Argentina:

Test matches

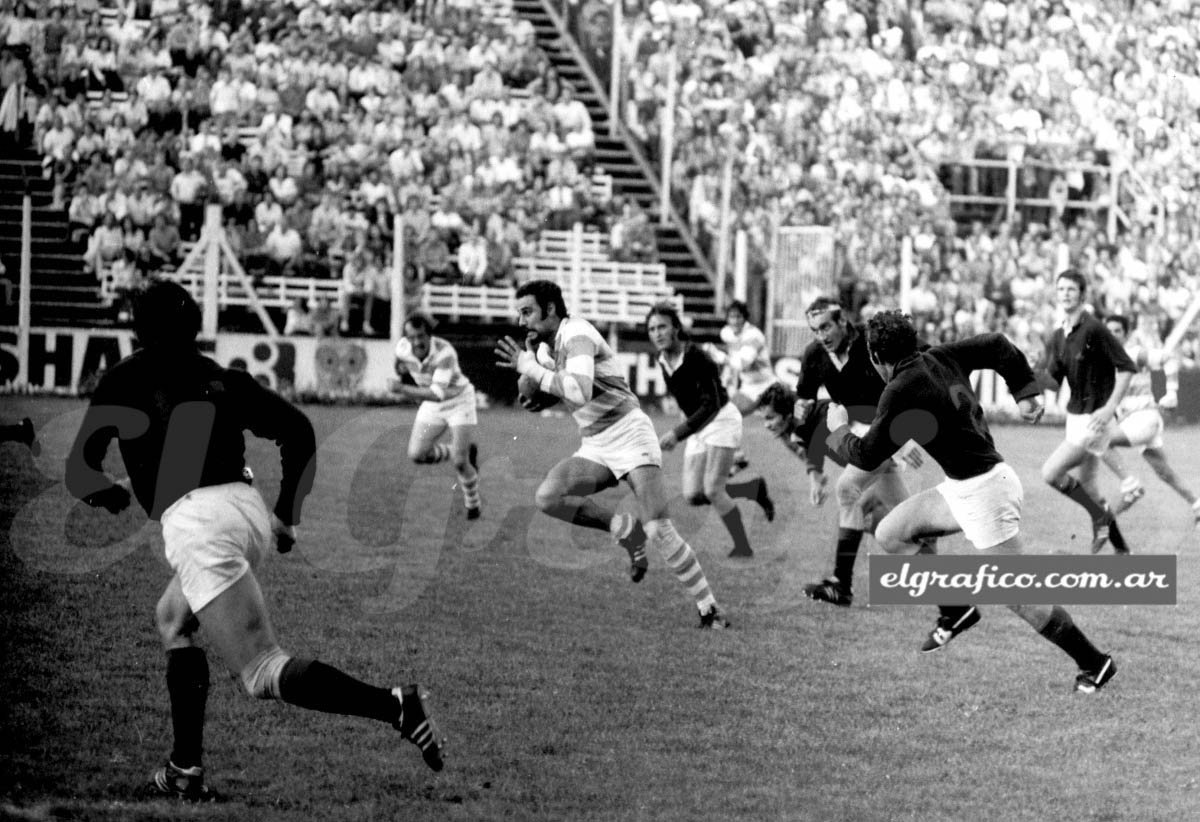
Alejandro Travaglini running with the ball during the second test v Argentina on 4 November

#	Date	Rival	City	Venue	Res.	Score
1	23 Sep	San Isidro Club	Buenos Aires	Estadio Ferro	D	13–13
2	27 Sep	Sur Rugby Union	Bahía Blanca	Club Liniers	W	84–3
3	30 Sep	Mar del Plata	Mar del Plata	Parque Camet	W	19–0
4	4 Oct	Río Negro & Neuquén	Neuquén	Colegio Don Bosco	W	113–0
5	7 Oct	Cuyo	El Challao	Marista RC	W	23–0
6	12 Oct	Córdoba	Córdoba	Club Universitario	W	50–7
7	14 Oct	Tucumán	Tucumán	Escuela Ed. Física	W	47–6
8	17 Oct	Salta RU	Salta	Gigante del Norte	W	100–0
9	21 Oct	Argentina	Buenos Aires	Estadio Ferro	W	14–6
10	24 Oct	Santa Fe	Santa Fe	Estadio 15 de Abril	W	67–12
11	28 Oct	Buenos Aires	Buenos Aires	Estadio Ferro	W	14–12
12	1 Nov	Rosario	Rosario	Plaza Jewell	W	43–12
13	4 Nov	Argentina	Buenos Aires	Estadio Ferro	L	16–18

Statistics
Pl	W	D	L	PS	PC
13	11	1	1	603	89

== Match details ==
Report of all the matches played by the Gazelles in Argentina:

23 September 1972

San Isidro Club	13–13	Gazelles
Try: Walter, Insúa; Con: Cutler; Pen: Cutler		Try: MacDonald, Verster; Con: J.Snyman; Pen: J.Snyman

Estadio Ferro Carril Oeste, Buenos Aires
Referee: Carlos A.Tozzi (Buenos Aires)

Team details

San Isidro Club
Gazzelles

San Isidro Club: J.Caballero; M.Walter, F.Ciro, R.Matarazzo, J.Otaola; F.G.Victorica, M.Cutler; R.Lucke, J.Cariacedo, M.Iglesias (capt.); J.Rodríguez Jurado, A.Anthony; F.Lafuente, O.Rocha, A.Orzábal.
Gazelles: R.Carlson; J.Germishuys, J.Jansen, J.Schlebusch, A.Swartz; J.Snyman, P.Bayvel; J.Verster; D.MacDonald, M.du Plessis; J.van Aswegen (capt.), K.de Klerk; J.Strauss, H.Reyneke, N.Bezuidenhout.

27 September 1972

Sur	3–84	Gazelles
Pen: J.C. Legorburu	Report	Try: Fourie (2), Van Aswegen, D.Snyman (2), Swartz (2), D.MacDonald (2), de Klerk, J.Snyman (2), Eloff, Borgen; Con: J.Snyman (12)

Estadio C.A. Liniers, Bahía Blanca
Referee: José Cabanas (Buenos Aires)

Team details

Sur RU
Gazzelles

Sur Rugby Union: P.Peterson; P.Fasano, D.Guevara, J.C.Legorburu, M.Vila; T.Greig, M.Ritacop; J.Legorburu, O.Siepe, R.Dau; A.Subotta, A.Morbello; A.Borromel, D.López, C.Sozzani.
Gazelles: J.Snyman, C.Fourie, P.Cronje, F.du Toit, A.Swartz; D.Snyman, B.Borgen; M.Eloff, D.MacDonald, J.van Eyk, J.van Aswegen (capt.), J.Kritzinger, C.van Jaarsveld, A.Kruger, J.le Roux.

30 September 1972

Mar del Plata	0–19	Gazelles
		Try: Fourie (2), du Toit; Con: D.Snyman, Pen: D.Snyman

Parque Camet, Mar del Plata
Referee: Ricardo Columbo (Buenos Aires)

Team details

Mar del Plata
Gazzelles

Mar del Plata: J.Viders; J.Prieto, C.Sosa, A.Uriaguereca, D.Fillippa; R.L ́Erario, R.Caparelli; R. Isabella, M.Riego, E.Feuillasier; D.Cordasco, W.Heath; C.Bonomo, N.Bosso, A.Bibbo.
Gazelles: C.Claasen, C.Fourie, P.Cronje, F.du Toit, J.Schlebusch, D.Snyman, P.Bayvel, J.Verster, M.du Plessis, M.Eloff, J.Kritzinger, K.de Klerk, N.Bezuidenhout, A.Kruger, J.Strauss.

4 October 1972

Río Negro y Neuquén	0–113	Gazelles
		Try: Fourie (7), Swartz (3), Cronje (2); Du Plessis (2), Carlson, Borgen; Kritzinger, MacDonald, J.Snyman du Toit; Con: J.Snyman (7), Carlson (6); Drop: J.Snyman

Colegio Don Bosco, Neuquén
Referee: Florencio Varela (Buenos Aires)

7 October 1972

Cuyo	0–23	Gazelles
		Try: MacDonald (2), Fourie, de Klerk; Con: D.Snyman (2); Pen: D.Snyman

Estadio Marista RC, Mendoza
Referee: Eduardo Niño (Buenos Aires)

Team details

Cuyo: E.Gandia; M.Brandi, R.Tarquini, O.Terranova (D.Muñiz), A: Dora; C: Navessi, L.Chacon; J.Nazassi, J.Navessi, J.P.Irrazabal; E.Sánchez, A.Cataneo; R.Iraneta, L.Ramos, R.Fariello.
Gazelles: R.Carlson, A.Read, P.Cronje, A.Swartz, C.Fourie, J.Snyman, B.Borgen, M.du Plessis, D.MacDonald, J.van Aswegen (capt.), K.de Klerk, J.Kritzinger, C.van Jaarsveld, A.Kruger, J.le Roux.

12 October 1972

Córdoba	7–50	Gazelles
Try: Pispiero; Pen: Martínez).		Try: Verster (2), Germishuys (2), Classen; Read, Kritzinger; Du Toit, De Klerk; Con: J.Snyman (4); Pen: J.Snyman (2)

Estadio Club Universitario, Córdoba
Referee: Armando Zungri (Buenos Aires)

Team details

Córdoba: F.Mezquida; C.Antoraz, J.B.Martínez, R.Resella, G.Pispiero; R: Agüero, N.Trebucq; J.Aguad, J.Aguad, J.Peralta, C.Sosa; R.Pasaglia, J.Larson; R.P.Dun, H.Bianchi, A.Paz.
Gazelles: C.Claasen, J.Germishuys, F.du Toit, A.Read, J.Jansen, J.Snyman, P.Bayvel, J.van Aswegen (capt.), M.Eloff, J.Verster, K.de Klerk, J.Kritzinger, C.van Jaarsveld, H.Reyneke, J.Strauss.

14 October 1972

Tucumán	6–47	Gazelles
Try: Rojas; Con: Castillo		Try: Fourie (4), du Plessis, Carlson; Read, Reyneke, Eloff, de Klerk; Con: D.Snyman (2); Pen: D.Snyman

Escuela de Educación Fisica, S.M. de Tucumán
Referee: César de Elizalde (Buenos Aires)

Team details

Tucumán: J.Buccetto; J.Rojas, A.Fagalde, H.Navajas, C: Cisint; L.Castillo, C.Nieva; Bach, J.Ghiringheli (capt.), J.Veglia; O.Ferrari, J.Iramain; J.Maxud, R.Roldán, C.Bonanno.
Gazelles: R.Carlson, C.Fourie, P.Cronje, A.Read, A.Swartz, D.Snyman, P.Bayvel, J.van Aswegen, M.du Plessis, J.Verster; K.de Klerk, M.Eloff, N: Bezuidenhout, H.Reyneke, J.le Roux.

17 October 1972

Salta	0–100	Gazelles
		Try: Germishuys (4), du Plessis (3), Verster (3); Cronje (2), Jansen (2), Reyneke; Kritzinger, du Toit, Eloff; D.Snyman; Con: D.Snyman (7), Carlson (3)

El Gigante del Norte, Salta
Referee: Bruno Bertelli (Buenos Aires)

Team details

Salta: J.Eaton; H.Fernández Bravo, S.Pintos, H.Medina, M.Molina; G: Lamarca, R.Bordieu; J.Biasutti, G.Smith, O.Cardoso; L.Grand Jean, C.Fernández; M.Sánchez, E.Zancona, E.Araoz.
Gazelles: R.Carlson, J.Jansen, P.Cronje, F.Du Toit, G.Germishuys, D.Snyman, P.Bayvel, J.Verster, M.du Plessis, C.van Jaarsveld, K.de Klerk, J.Kritzinger, N.Bezuidenhout, H.Reyneke, J.le Roux (Eloff).

21 October 1972

Argentina	6–14	Gazelles
Pen: E.Morgan (2)		Try: Fourie, Swartz, Cronje; Con: D.Snyman

Estadio Ferro Carril Oeste, Buenos Aires
Referee: Carlos A.Tozzi (Buenos Aires)

Team details

Argentina
Gazzelles

Argentina: D.Morgan; A.Altberg, R.Matarazzo, A.Travaglini, E.Morgan; H.Porta, A.Etchegaray (capt.); J.Whitman, H.Miguens, J.Cariacedo; J.Fernández, A.Anthony; F.Insúa, R.Handley, R.Foster.
Gazelles: R.Carlson, P.Cronje, F.Du Toit, A.Swartz, D.Snyman, P.Bayvel, J.van Aswegen(capt.), M.du Plessis, J.Verster; K.de Klerk, J.Kritzinger, N.Bezuidenhout, H.Reyneke, J.le Roux.

24 October 1972

Santa Fe	12–67	Gazelles
Try: Rapela; Con: Tenca; Pen: Tenca (2)		Try: Fourie (4), Germishuys (3), Read; Verster, Bayvel, Kruger; Con: J.Snyman (4), Pen: J.Snyman (5)

Estadio 15 de Abril, Santa Fe
Referee: Armando Zungri (Buenos Aires)

Team details

Santa Fe: E.Tenca; J.Trapaga, A.Caino, J.Rapela, C.Ibaquuer; J.Krezcam, A.Zilonka; A.Campanella, M.Celentano, O.Zitelli; P.Giardini, J.Sofredini; G.Abud, J.Tejerina, J.C.Colombo.
Gazelles: C.Claasen, J.Germishuys, A.Swartz, A.Read, C.Fourie, J.Snyman, P.Bayvel, J.van Aswegen (capt.), M.du Plessis, J.Verster, M.Eloff, J.Kritzinger; J.van Jaarsveld, A.Kruger, J.Strauss.

28 October 1972

Buenos Aires	12–14	Gazelles
Pen: Harris Smith (2), Gradín (2)		Try: Carlson, Fourie, Eloff; Con: J.Snyman

Estadio Ferro Carril Oeste, Buenos Aires
Referee: César de Elizalde (Buenos Aires)

Team details

Buenos Aires: R.Espagnol; G.Pérez Leiros, L.Esteras, M.Dantilongue, A.Altberg; T.Harris Smith, L.Gradin (capt.); N.Carbone, M.Morgan, M.Iglesias; R: Castro, J: Virasoro; O.Carbone, J.Dumas, M.Carluccio.
Gazelles: R.Carlson, C.Fourie, F.Du Toit, J.Jansen, A.Swartz; J.Snyman, P.Bayvel, J.Verster, M.du Plessis, M.Eloff, K.de Klerk, J.Kritzinger, J.van Jaarsveld, H.Reyneke, J.le Roux.

1 November 1972

Rosario	12–43	Gazelles
Try: García; Con: Seaton; Pen: J.Escalante, Seaton		Try: Germishuys (3), Carlson (2); Read, Verster; Con: Fourie (2), J.Snyman; Pen: J.Snyman (3)

Plaza Jewell, Rosario
Referee: Florencio Varela (Buenos Aires)

Team details

Rosario
Gazzelles

Rosario: J.Uljich; C: García, G.Torneo, G.Seaton, A.Kniht, J.Escalante, R.Castagna; M.Chesta, M.Boaza, R.Imhoff; R.Suárez, M.Senatore; J.Gómez Keny, J.Constante, S.Furno.
Gazelles: R.Carlson, C.Fourie, P.Cronje, A.Read, J.Germishuys, J.Snyman, B.Borge; M.Eloff, M.du Plessis, J.Verster; K.de Klerk, J.Kritzinger, J.van Jaarsveld, A.Kruger, J.Strauss.

4 November 1972

Argentina	18–16	Gazelles
Try: E.Morgan (2), Porta, Travaglini; Con: Porta		Try: J.Snyman, Borgen; Con: D.Snyman; Pen: D.Snyman (2)

Estadio Ferro Carril Oeste, Buenos Aires
Referee: Florencio Varela (Buenos Aires).

Team details

Argentina
Gazzelles

Argentina: D.Morgan; A: Altberg, R.Matarazzo, A: Travaglini, E.Morgan; H.Porta, A.Etchegaray (capt.); J.Wittman, H.Miguens, J.Cariacedo; J.Fernández, A.Anthony; F.Insúa, R.Handley, R.Foster.
Gazelles: R.Carlson (J.Snyman), C.Fourie, P.Cronje, F.du Toit, A.Swartz; D.Snyman, B.Borgen, J.van Aswegen (capt.), M.du Plessis, J.Verster; K.de Klerk, J.Kritzinger, J.le Roux, H.Reyneke, J.van Jaarsveld.

== Players' statistics ==
Player	Match	try	conv.	pen.	drop	Points
Paul Bayvel	8	1	0	0	0	4
Niek Bezuidenhout	5	1	0	0	0	4
Brian T. Borgen	5	3	0	0	0	12
Ray Carlson	9	5	9	0	0	38
Cornelius Claasen	4	1	0	0	0	4
Peter Cronjé	9	5	0	0	0	20
Kevin de Klerk	11	4	0	0	0	16
Morne du Plessis	11	6	0	0	0	24
Francois du Toit	8	4	0	0	0	16
Michael Eloff	9	5	0	0	0	20
Carel Fourie	10	22	2	0	0	92
Gerrie Germishuys	5	12	0	0	0	48
Joggie Jansen	4	2	0	0	0	8
Klippies Kritzinger	11	3	0	0	0	12
Arnold Kruger	5	3	0	0	0	12
Johan le Roux	8	0	0	0	0	0
Dugald MacDonald	4	5	0	0	0	20
Alan Read	5	4	0	0	0	16
Hendre Reyneke	8	2	0	0	0	8
Jan Schlebusch	1	0	0	0	0	0
Dawie Snyman	8	3	16	5	0	59
Jackie Snyman	7	4	29	11	1	110
Johan Strauss	5	0	0	0	0	0
Albert Swartz	9	6	0	0	0	24
Jannie van Aswegen	9	1	0	0	0	4
Johanes van Eyk	1	0	0	0	0	0
Christo van Jaarsveld	10	0	0	0	0	0
Jacobus Verster	10	8	0	0	0	32
