= Willem Stapelberg =

South African rugby union footballer

- Born: Willem Pieter Stapelberg; 29 January 1947 (age 79) Pretoria, Gauteng
- Height: 1.80 m (5 ft 11 in)
- Weight: 85 kg (187 lb)
- School: Hoërskool Hendrik Verwoerd, Pretoria

Rugby union career
Provincial / State sides
Years	Team	Apps	(Points)
- Northern Transvaal
International career
Years	Team	Apps	(Points)
1974	South Africa	2	(8)

Willem Pieter Stapelberg (born 29 January 1947) is a former South African rugby union player.

== Playing career ==
A police detective by profession, Stapelberg played provincial rugby for Northern Transvaal and was a member of the Currie Cup winning teams in 1968, 1973 and 1974.

Stapelberg toured with the Springboks to France in 1974 and made his test debut against France on 23 November 1974 in Toulouse. He played in both test matches on the French tour, scoring a try in each match. He also played in four tour matches and scored one further try for the Springboks.

=== Test history ===
No.	Opposition	Result (SA 1st)	Position	Tries	Date	Venue
1.	France	13–4	Wing	1	23 November 1974	Stade Municipal, Toulouse
2.	France	10–8	Wing	1	30 November 1974	Parc des Princes, Paris

== Accolades ==
Stapelberg was named one of the five SA Rugby players of the Year for 1974. The four other players named, were three members of the 1974 British Lions team that toured South Africa, namely Gareth Edwards, Willie John McBride and J. P. R. Williams as well as the South African lock forward, John Williams.

== See also ==
- List of South Africa national rugby union players – Springbok no. 482
