= Peter Cronjé =

South African rugby union footballer (1949–2020)

- Born: Peter Arnold Cronjé; 21 September 1949 Johannesburg, Transvaal, Union of South Africa
- Died: 4 September 2020 (aged 70)
- Height: 1.82 m (6 ft 0 in)
- Weight: 86 kg (190 lb)
- School: Parktown Boys' High School

Rugby union career
- Position: Centre
Provincial / State sides
Years	Team	Apps	(Points)
1970–76	Transvaal	49	
1978	Natal	11	
International career
Years	Team	Apps	(Points)
1971–74	South Africa	7	(10)
1971–74	South Africa (tour)	8	(6)

Peter Arnold Cronjé (21 September 1949 – 4 September 2020) was a South African rugby union player.

== Playing career ==
Cronjé played provincial rugby for Transvaal and made his test debut for the Springboks against France on 12 June 1971 at the Free State Stadium in Bloemfontein. He toured with the Springboks to Australia in 1971 and played in all three test matches. In 1972 he toured with the Gazelles, a South African under 24 team to Argentina. He then played in the last two test matches in the series against the 1974 British Lions, scoring his third test try in the final test against the Lions. Cronjé also played in eight tour matches, scoring two tries.

=== Test history ===
No.	Opposition	Result (SA 1st)	Position	Tries	Date	Venue
1.	France	22–9	Centre		12 June 1971	Free State Stadium, Bloemfontein
2.	France	8–8	Centre	1	19 June 1971	Kings Park, Durban
3.	Australia	19–11	Centre		17 July 1971	Sydney Cricket Ground, Sydney
4.	Australia	14–6	Centre		31 July 1971	Brisbane Exhibition Ground, Brisbane
5.	Australia	18–6	Centre	1	7 August 1971	Sydney Cricket Ground, Sydney
6.	British Lions	9–26	Centre		13 July 1974	Boet Erasmus Stadium, Port Elizabeth
7.	(British & Irish Lions) British Lions	13–13	Centre	1	27 July 1974	Ellis Park Stadium, Johannesburg

== See also ==
- List of South Africa national rugby union players – Springbok no. 447
- Peter attended Wynberg Boys High School as a boarder from Junior School. He matriculated from Parktown Boys' High School, Johannesburg, in the Class of '67
