= Barry Wolmarans =

South African rugby union footballer

- Born: Barend Johannes Wolmarans; 22 March 1953 (age 73) Oudtshoorn, Western Cape
- Height: 1.65 m (5 ft 5 in)
- Weight: 73 kg (161 lb)
- School: Oudtshoorn High School

Rugby union career
- Position: Scrum-half
Provincial / State sides
Years	Team	Apps	(Points)
- Boland
1975–1984	Free State	116	
International career
Years	Team	Apps	(Points)
1977	South Africa	1	(4)

Barend Johannes 'Barry' Wolmarans (born 22 March 1953 in Oudtshoorn, Western Cape, South Africa) is a former South African rugby union player.

== Playing career ==
Wolmarans made his provincial debut for Boland while studying at the Wellington Teachers College. He joined the Free State in 1975 and played 116 matches for the union and was part of the team that won the Currie Cup in 1976. At the time of his retirement in 1984, Wolmarans and his fly–half partner, De Wet Ras played together as a combination on 89 occasions, which was a South African provincial record at the time.

Wolmarans made his test match debut for the Springboks against the World XV on 27 August 1977 at Loftus Versfeld in Pretoria and scored a try in his debut test. He was selected for the 1981 tour to New Zealand and the USA and played six matches on tour.

=== Test history ===
No.	Opposition	Result (SA 1st)	Position	Tries	Date	Venue
1.	World XV	45–24	Scrum-half	1	27 August 1977	Loftus Versfeld, Pretoria

== See also ==
- List of South Africa national rugby union players – Springbok no. 495
