= Nelie Smith =

South African rugby union footballer

- Born: Cornelius Michael Smith; 8 May 1934 Bloemfontein, Orange Free State, Union of South Africa (now Free State)
- Died: 2 May 2016 (aged 81) Strand, Western Cape
- Height: 1.75 m (5 ft 9 in)
- Weight: 77 kg (170 lb)
- School: Hoërskool Sentraal, Bloemfontein
- University: University of the Free State

Rugby union career
- Position: Scrumhalf
Amateur team(s)
Years	Team	Apps	(Points)
- Collegians (Bloemfontein)
Provincial / State sides
Years	Team	Apps	(Points)
1956–1965	Free State	60	
1966	Griqualand West	4	
International career
Years	Team	Apps	(Points)
1963–1965	South Africa	7	(12)
Coaching career
- Years: Team
- –: Free State
- 1980–1981: South Africa
- –: Eastern Province
- –: Northern Free State
- –: Ballymena R.F.C.
- 1985–1989: Rovigo

Cornelius Michael "Nelie" Smith (8 May 1934 – 2 May 2016) was a South African rugby union player and coach.

== Playing career ==
Smith made his provincial debut at scrumhalf for Orange Free State during the 1956 season and went on to play 60 matches for Orange Free State, captaining them 37 times. He also played four matches for Griqualand West.

He made his test debut for the Springboks during the Australian rugby tour of 1963 in the third test on 24 August 1963 at the Ellis Park in Johannesburg. South Africa lost the match 9–11, with Smith scoring all nine points. Smith scored twelve points in seven test matches for South Africa and captained the team in four tests. He also played in twelve tour matches and scored a further nine points for the Springboks.

=== Test history ===
No.	Opponents	Results (SA 1st)	Position	Points	Dates	Venue
1.	Australia	9–11	Scrumhalf	9 (3 pen)	24 Aug 1963	Ellis Park, Johannesburg
2.	Australia	22–6	Scrumhalf		7 Sep 1963	Boet Erasmus Stadium, Port Elizabeth
3.	Wales	24–3	Scrumhalf	3 (1 try)	23 May 1964	Kings Park, Durban
4.	France	6–8	Scrumhalf (c)		25 Jul 1964	PAM Brink Stadium, Springs
5.	Australia	11–18	Scrumhalf (c)		19 Jun 1965	Sydney Cricket Ground, Sydney
6.	Australia	8–12	Scrumhalf (c)		26 Jun 1965	Lang Park, Brisbane
7.	New Zealand	0–13	Scrumhalf (c)		21 Aug 1965	Carisbrook, Dunedin

== Coaching career ==
Smith coached numerous teams, both in South Africa and internationally. His first big success as a coach was in 1976, when he and Sakkie van Zyl, coached the Orange Free State to its first Currie Cup title. He was the Springboks coach in 1980 when the Springboks defeated Billy Beaumont's Lions and in 1981 he was the coach during the Springbok tour of New Zealand and the United States.

In the year 1985, Smith was approached by the Italian club Rugby Rovigo. During a 2 year window he contributed in re-establishing the team as one of the strongest Italian rugby club. He forged a scrum culture, and thereafter contributed in the signing of fellow South Africans Tito Lupini, Naas Botha and Gert Smal. Smith played a crucial role to help Rugby Rovigo secure its 10th national championship in 1988, reaching a back to back final in 1989. His impact in ending a 9 years trophy drought is still a milestone in Rugby Rovigo history, the most rugby-addicted city in Italy.

== See also ==
- List of South Africa national rugby union players – Springbok no. 389

Sporting positions
Preceded by Abie Malan	Springbok Captain; 1964–1965	Succeeded by Dawie de Villiers
Preceded by (South Africa) Johan Claassen	South Africa National Rugby Union Coach; 1980–1981	Succeeded by (South Africa) Cecil Moss
