= Gerald Bosch =

South African rugby union player

- Born: Gerald Raymond Bosch; 12 May 1949 (age 77) Vereeniging, South Africa
- Height: 1.79 m (5 ft 10 in)
- Weight: 75 kg (165 lb)
- School: General Smuts High School, Vereeniging

Rugby union career
Provincial / State sides
Years	Team	Apps	(Points)
1972–1978	Transvaal		(896)
International career
Years	Team	Apps	(Points)
1974–1976	South Africa	9	(89)

Gerald Raymond Bosch (born 12 May 1949) is a former South African rugby union player.

== Playing career ==
Bosch played his provincial rugby for Transvaal and made his debut for the union in 1972. During his career with Transvaal he scored 521 points in Currie Cup matches and 896 points in all provincial matches.

He made his test debut for the Springboks on 22 June 1974 at Loftus Versfeld in Pretoria, in the second test against the touring British Lions team captained by Willie John McBride. Bosch scored 9 points in the match but was dropped from the team for the remaining matches in the series. He returned to the side for the Springboks' tour to France at the end of 1974 and played in both test matches as well as in five tour matches.

In 1975 Bosch once again played in both test matches against the touring French team and set a South African record by scoring 22 points in a test match during the second test on 28 June 1975 at Loftus Versfeld. His record was only equaled by Gavin Johnson in 1993 and again by Joel Stransky, later during 1993. Johnson improved the record to 28 point in a test against Western Samoa in 1995. In 1976 he played in all four test matches against the touring All Blacks, captained by Andy Leslie. Bosch scored a total of 89 points in his 9 test matches and a further 43 point in tour matches.

=== Test history ===
No.	Opposition	Result (SA 1st)	Position	Points	Date	Venue
1.	British Lions	9–28	Flyhalf	9 (2 pen, 1 drop)	22 June 1974	Loftus Versfeld, Pretoria
2.	France	13–4	Flyhalf	6 (2 pen)	23 November 1974	Le stade de Toulouse, Toulouse
3.	France	10–8	Flyhalf	6 (2 pen)	30 November 1974	Parc des Princes, Paris
4.	France	38–25	Flyhalf	13 (2 conv, 3 pen)	21 June 1975	Free State Stadium, Bloemfontein
5.	France	33–18	Flyhalf	22 (2 conv, 6 pen)	28 June 1975	Loftus Versfeld, Pretoria
6.	New Zealand	16–7	Flyhalf	5 (1 conv, 1 pen)	24 July 1976	Kings Park Stadium, Durban
7.	New Zealand	9–15	Flyhalf	9 (3 pen)	14 August 1976	Free State Stadium, Bloemfontein
8.	New Zealand	15–-10	Flyhalf	8 (1 conv, 2 pen)	4 September 1976	Newlands, Cape Town
9.	New Zealand	15–14	Flyhalf	11 (1 conv, 2 pen, 1 drop)	18 September 1976	Ellis Park, Johannesburg

Legend: pen = penalty (3 pts.); conv = conversion (2 pts.), drop = drop kick (3 pts.).

== Accolades ==
In 1972, Bosch was one of the five Young Players of the Year, along with Paul Bayvel, Pikkie du Toit, Dugald MacDonald and Jackie Snyman.

== See also ==
- List of South Africa national rugby union players – Springbok no. 467
