= Dirk Froneman =

South African rugby union footballer

- Born: Dirk Cornelius Froneman; 14 April 1954 (age 72) Winburg, Free State
- Height: 1.73 m (5 ft 8 in)
- Weight: 77 kg (170 lb)
- School: Sarel Cilliers High School, Glencoe, KwaZulu-Natal
- University: University of the Free State

Rugby union career
Provincial / State sides
Years	Team	Apps	(Points)
1976	Free State		
International career
Years	Team	Apps	(Points)
1977	South Africa	1	

Dirk Cornelius Froneman (born 14 April 1954 in Winburg, Free State, South Africa) is a former South African rugby union player.

== Playing career ==
Froneman made his provincial debut for the Free State in 1976 and was part of the Free State team that won the Currie Cup in 1976. Froneman played his only test match for the Springboks against the World XV on 27 August 1977 at Loftus Versfeld in Pretoria.

=== Test history ===
No.	Opposition	Result (SA 1st)	Position	Tries	Date	Venue
1.	World XV	45–24	Centre		27 August 1977	Loftus Versfeld, Pretoria

== Accolades ==
Froneman was one of the five Young Players of the Year for 1976, along with Wouter Hugo, Divan Serfontein, Nick Mallet and LM Rossouw.

== See also ==
- List of South Africa national rugby union players – Springbok no. 492
