= Hermanus Potgieter =

South African rugby union footballer

- Born: Hermanus Lambertus Potgieter; 11 November 1953 (age 73) Kirkwood, Eastern Cape
- Height: 1.80 m (5 ft 11 in)
- Weight: 84 kg (185 lb)
- School: Kirkwood High School
- University: University of the Free State

Rugby union career
- Position: Wing
Provincial / State sides
| Years | Team | Apps | (Points) |
- Free State
| - | Eastern Province | | |
International career
| Years | Team | Apps | (Points) |
| 1977 | South Africa | 1 | (4) |

Hermanus Lambertus Potgieter (born 11 January 1953 in Kirkwood, Eastern Cape, South Africa) is a former South African rugby union player.

== Playing career ==
Potgieter attended the University of Stellenbosch for two years in 1973 and 1974, after which he relocated to the University of the Free State. He went on the play his senior provincial rugby for the Free State and Eastern Province. Potgieter made his test match debut for the Springboks against the World XV on 27 August 1977 at Loftus Versfeld in Pretoria and scored a try on his test debut.

=== Test history ===
| No. | Opposition | Result (SA 1st) | Position | Tries | Date | Venue |
|---|---|---|---|---|---|---|
| 1. | World XV | 45–24 | Wing | 1 | 27 August 1977 | Loftus Versfeld, Pretoria |

== Accolades ==
Potgieter was one of the five Young Players of the Year in 1975, along with Tommy du Plessis, Christo Wagenaar, De Wet Ras and Corrie Pypers. In 1977 he was one of the five players nominated for SA Rugby Player of the Year, when Moaner van Heerden received the award.

== See also ==
- List of South Africa national rugby union players – Springbok no. 493
