= Delmas (disambiguation) =

Delmas is a surname and masculine given name. It may also refer to:

== Places ==
- Delmas, Saskatchewan, Canada, a hamlet
- Delmas, Haiti, a commune
- Delmas, South Africa, a farming town
  - Delmas (House of Assembly of South Africa constituency)

== Other uses ==
- Delmas (shipping company), a Europe-Africa shipping and transportation firm
- Delmas Commando, a former light infantry regiment of the South African Army
- Hoërskool Delmas, a public high school in Delmas, South Africa

== See also ==
- Delma, a genus of lizards
- Delmas Treason Trial, the 1986 prosecution of 22 South African anti-apartheid activists
