= 99 call =

1974 British rugby union retaliation policy

In rugby union, the "99" call was a policy of simultaneous retaliation by the British Lions during their 1974 tour to South Africa. The tour was marred by on-pitch violence, which the match officials did little to control and the relative absence of cameras compared to the modern game made citing and punishment after the fact unlikely. (Note: "According to the captain, Willie John McBride, the call was supposed to be '999'- for emergency - but he never had time to shout out the third '9'!"("'A Pride of Lions' Presented by Genesis Publications" (PDF). Rugby Football Union Rugby Museum. p. 7.))

Lions' captain Willie John McBride therefore instigated a policy of "one in, all in" - that is, when one Lion retaliated, all other Lions were expected to join in the melee or hit the nearest Springbok. By doing so, the referee would be unable to identify any single instigator and so would be left with the choice of sending off all or none of the team. In this respect, the "99" call was extremely successful, as no Lions player was sent off during the tour.

According to former Wales international and Lion John Taylor, the 99 call resulted from an incident that occurred during the Lions' 1968 South Africa tour that saw John O'Shea become the first and to date only Lion to have been sent off during a Lions tour. In 2013, Taylor recalled that during a Lions tour match against Eastern Transvaal,

A scuffle broke out amongst the forwards (handbags – no damage) and Tess (O'Shea) was isolated by half a dozen home forwards. When the dust settled the home referee singled him out (the only Lion involved) and dismissed him. . . . Willie John rushed down from the stand to offer protection, dealing peremptorily with one idiot as he tried to attack Tess, and this was the genesis of the infamous '99' call six years later in 1974.

At the battle of Boet Erasmus Stadium, one of the most violent matches in rugby history, there is famous video footage of J. P. R. Williams running over half of the pitch and launching himself at Moaner van Heerden after such a call, something that Williams said he was not proud of.

The battles created one of rugby's immortal tales: [Gordon] Brown hit his opposite number, Johan de Bruyn, so hard that the Orange Free State man's glass eye flew out and landed in the mud. "so there we are, 30 players plus the ref, on our hands and knees scrabbling about in the mire looking for this glass eye," recalled Brown in an interview before his death from non-Hodgkin lymphoma in 2001, aged 53. "Eventually, someone yells 'Eureka' whereupon de Bruyn grabs it and plonks it straight back in the gaping hole in his face."

— Clem and Greg Thomas.

== Shinty ==
In 1982 Fr. Eugene O'Sullivan of Tayforth famously appeared on the front page of the Daily Star having been sent-off for punching his opponent. The Kyles Athletic player was lucky that John-Joe Moran was restrained by Sam "the vet" Mansley from doing further damage. However, the return fixture in Perth entered shinty folklore when once again Fr. O'Sullivan was on the receiving end of some extremely unsavoury treatment but didn't rise to the provocation this time. At half time following a discussion between Willie Dowds, John-Joe Moran & Sam Mansley they decided to invoke Willie John McBrides "99" call. Thus, the next time Fr O'Sullivan was hit the "99" call went out. Within seconds mayhem descended on the South Inch and not one Kyles player was left standing. There were no sending-offs and Tayforth ran-out 4-1 winners.
