= Rampie Stander =

South African rugby union footballer

- Born: Jacobus Casperus Johannes Stander; 25 December 1944 Cape Town, Western Cape
- Died: 28 August 1980 (aged 35) Bloemfontein, Free State
- Height: 1.85 m (6 ft 1 in)
- Weight: 102 kg (225 lb)
- School: Vanderbijlpark High School
- University: Stellenbosch University

Rugby union career
Provincial / State sides
Years	Team	Apps	(Points)
1967–1971	Western Province	23	
1972–1980	Free State		
International career
Years	Team	Apps	(Points)
1974–1976	South Africa	5	

Jacobus Casperus Johannes 'Rampie' Stander (25 December 1944 – 28 August 1980) was a South African rugby union player.

== Playing career ==
Born in Cape Town, Stander grew up in Vanderbijlpark and after he finished school, enrolled at Stellenbosch University for a law degree. He played rugby for the university from 1966 to 1971 and during this time made his senior provincial debut for Western Province. Stander moved to Bloemfontein in 1972 and continued his playing career with the Free State.

Stander was selected on the replacement bench for the Springboks during the test series against the 1974 touring British Lions team. He did not get an opportunity during the first three tests and made his test debut during the fourth test against the Lions when he replaced Niek Bezuidenhout after seventeen minutes in the second half. Stander toured with the Springboks to France at the end of 1974, but Bezuidenhout regained his place for the test series during the tour. In 1976 Stander was selected for all four test matches against the touring All Blacks. Stander played five tests and three tour matches for South Africa and scored one try during a tour match.

=== Test history ===
No.	Opposition	Result (SA 1st)	Position	Tries	Date	Venue
1.	British Lions	13–13	Replacement		27 July 1974	Ellis Park, Johannesburg
2.	New Zealand	16–7	Loosehead prop		24 July 1976	Kings Park Stadium, Durban
3.	New Zealand	9–15	Loosehead prop		14 August 1976	Free State Stadium, Bloemfontein
4.	New Zealand	15–10	Loosehead prop		4 September 1976	Newlands, Cape Town
5.	New Zealand	15–14	Loosehead prop		18 September 1976	Ellis Park, Johannesburg

== See also ==
- List of South Africa national rugby union players – Springbok no. 479
