= Gordon Brown (rugby union) =

British Lions & Scotland international rugby union player

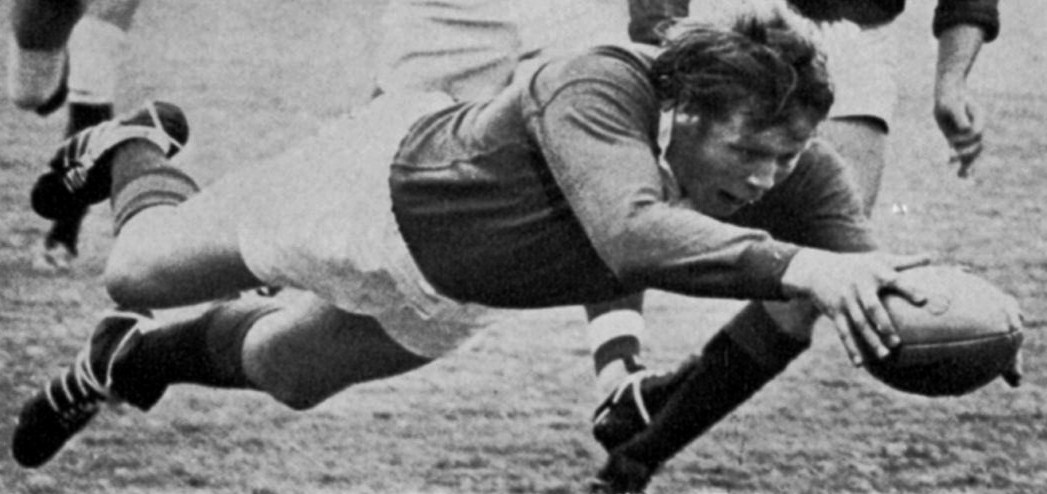
- Scottish Lock Gordon Brown's Try against Western Transvaal 1974
- Born: Gordon Lamont Brown; 1 November 1947 Troon, Scotland
- Died: 19 March 2001 (aged 53) Troon, Scotland
- Height: 1.96 m (6 ft 5 in)
- Weight: 110 kg (17 st 5 lb; 240 lb)
- School: Marr College
- Notable relative(s): John Brown (father), Peter Brown (brother) John Brown (brother)

Rugby union career
- Position: Lock
Amateur team(s)
Years	Team	Apps	(Points)
- West of Scotland
–	Marr College FP		
- Correct as of 5 March 2007
International career
Years	Team	Apps	(Points)
1969-1976	Scotland	30	(0)
1971, 1974, 1977	British and Irish Lions	8	(8)
- Correct as of 5 March 2007

Gordon Lamont Brown (1 November 1947 – 19 March 2001) was a Scottish rugby union footballer. Nicknamed "Broon frae Troon" (i.e. Brown from Troon, his home town), Brown is considered one of Scotland's greatest-ever rugby players. Playing as a second row forward, he was an integral part of Scotland's tight five during the early 1970s, along with Ian McLauchlan, Sandy Carmichael, Frank Laidlaw and Alastair McHarg, which became known collectively as the Mean Machine. He also represented the British and Irish Lions on three tours with distinction. Brown was inducted into the International Rugby Hall of Fame in 2001, which later integrated with the World Rugby Hall of Fame, into which he was inducted in 2015. He was also an inductee to the Scottish Rugby Union Hall of Fame in 2010.

== Family ==
Brown was from a sporting family, his elder brother Peter also played for and captained the Scottish side. His father, John played goalkeeper for the Scottish football side and also appeared in the Scottish Open at Royal Troon alongside golfing greats such as Arnold Palmer.

He is also the nephew of footballers Tom and Jim Brown.

Speaking of the brothers Brown, he thinks their skill was in their genes, but that Peter and Gordon were very different:

They inherited sporting ability, for their father was an international goalkeeper. They were both big, the young Gordon, being at 6 feet 5 inches a couple of inches the taller, and they were both natural ball-players. There the resemblance stopped: Gordon's play could have been recorded on film and used to educate any aspirant lock-forward. He was exemplary in his orthodoxy. Peter was an individualist, eccentric, surprising and brilliant. Not surprisingly he was a great Sevens player: I don't think Gordon shone at the short game. I doubt if it could rouse him sufficiently.

== Rugby ==
A product of Marr College and West of Scotland, Brown won his first cap for Scotland on 6 December 1969 against South Africa in a 6–3 victory at Murrayfield Stadium. He retained his place for the Five Nations opener against France but was dropped for the Wales match for his brother Peter. Gordon Brown then went on to replace Peter Brown at half-time due to injury, and this was the first time a brother replaced a brother in an international match.

He was selected on the 1971 British Lions tour to New Zealand and despite two other second row forwards travelling, Brown achieved test selection. He went on the 1974 British Lions tour to South Africa where he won five caps, and partnered Willie John McBride in the engine room of the scrum, during which he scored a remarkable eight tries and won a further 3 caps. He went on a third tour and played in a non-cap match against Fiji at the end of the 1977 British Lions tour to New Zealand.

A major criticism of Brown was that he played better for the British Lions than his own country. Although, on a Lions tour he was given the ability to live and train as a full-time rugby player and, with world class teammates.

He was what is often called a player's player. The average spectator, not good at seeing who wins the ball in the line-out for instance, could watch a match without being aware of Gordon Brown. Yet the fact remains that packs that contained him invariably did better than the same pack with a replacement. He was the supreme working forward, and the most important member of what may be the best front five Scotland has ever had... In contrast... it was a frequent criticism that he never played quite so well for Scotland as people had heard he had done for the Lions.

Unfortunately his International rugby career came to a somewhat inauspicious end. In December, 1976, he was playing in a match between Glasgow and the North-Midlands, he was suspended for three months after getting into a fight with Allan Hardie, in which Brown chased Hardie, threw him to the ground and kicked him. Prior to this, Hardie had kneed Brown in the face and proceed to stamp on the open wound on Brown's brow after the initial attack went unnoticed by the referee. The suspension meant that he missed three internationals and was banned from training at any rugby club. He trained daily at Ibrox stadium under the guidance of Jock Wallace of Rangers who put him through a gruelling fitness regime. Gordon remembered being made to sprint up and down the terraces at Ibrox until he was sick. After missing three months of rugby he was selected for the British Lions tour of New Zealand 1977. Because of a string of injuries, he never played for Scotland again. LP

== Death ==
Gordon Brown died from non-Hodgkin lymphoma aged 53 in March 2001. His funeral was attended by former Scotland and Lions teammates and opponents from the whole rugby world.

The [99 call] battles [of the 1974 British Lions tour to South Africa] created one of rugby's immortal tales: Brown hit his opposite number, Johan de Bruyn, so hard that the Orange Free State man's glass eye flew out and landed in the mud. "so there we are, 30 players plus the ref, on our hands and knees scrabbling about in the mire looking for this glass eye," recalled Brown in an interview before his death from non-Hodgkin lymphoma in 2001, aged 53. "Eventually, someone yells 'Eureka' whereupon de Bruyn grabs it and plonks it straight back in the gaping hole in his face."

— Clem and Greg Thomas.

As reported by The Daily Telegraph, at a fundraising dinner held in late February 2001 for Brown due to his illness, he met with de Bruyn again.

Twenty-seven years on and De Bruyn was tracked down ... and persuaded, with little or no effort, to fly over and wait in the wings on Wednesday night as a clip of Brown telling his famous story was played on the big screen. At which stage MC Fergus Slattery interrupted proceedings and beckoned the 24-stone De Bruyn to the stage and, to the amazement of Brown, the former Springbok presented him with the glass eye which was mounted on a carved wooden rugby ball. "I'll be keeping my eye on you for ever more," said De Bruyn, meeting Brown for the first time since the incident. "I never realised Gordon used the story in his speeches but I am glad, it is a funny story and a true one. It was wonderful to meet him and I wish him well in his fight for health."
