= Moaner van Heerden =

South African rugby union footballer

- Born: Johannes Lodewikus van Heerden; 18 July 1951 (age 75) Pretoria, Gauteng, South Africa
- Height: 1.95 m (6 ft 5 in)
- Weight: 104 kg (229 lb)

Rugby union career
Provincial / State sides
Years	Team	Apps	(Points)
1972–77, 80	Northern Transvaal		
1978–80	Transvaal		
International career
Years	Team	Apps	(Points)
1974–1980	South Africa	17	(4)

Johannes Lodewikus 'Moaner' van Heerden (born 18 July 1951) is a former South African rugby union international player. He played as a lock.

His son, Wikus van Heerden, is also a South African international who played for Saracens in the Guinness Premiership before retiring in 2012.

== Playing career ==
Van Heerden made his debut in senior provincial rugby for Northern Transvaal in 1972. In 1974 he played his first test match for Springboks next to Johan de Bruyn, a fellow lock debutant, in the third test against the touring Lions team of Willie John McBride at the Boet Erasmus Stadium in Port Elizabeth.From 1974 to 1980, van Heerden appeared in 17 test matches and scored one try. He also played in six tour matches for the Springboks.

=== Test history ===
No.	Opposition	Result (SA 1st)	Position	Tries	Date	Venue
1.	British Lions	9–26	Lock		13 July 1974	Boet Erasmus Stadium, Port Elizabeth
2.	(British & Irish Lions) British Lions	13–13	Lock		27 July 1974	Ellis Park, Johannesburg
3.	France	13–4	Lock		23 November 1974	Stade Municipal, Toulouse
4.	France	10–8	Lock		30 November 1974	Parc des Princes, Paris
5.	France	38–25	Lock		21 June 1975	Free State Stadium, Bloemfontein
6.	France	33–18	Lock		28 June 1975	Loftus Versfeld, Pretoria
7.	New Zealand	16–7	Lock		24 July 1976	Kings Park, Durban
8.	New Zealand	9–15	Lock		14 August 1976	Free State Stadium, Bloemfontein
9.	New Zealand	15–10	Lock		4 September 1976	Newlands, Cape Town
10.	New Zealand	15–14	Lock		18 September 1976	Ellis Park, Johannesburg
11.	World XV	45–24	Lock		27 August 1977	Loftus Versfeld, Pretoria
12.	(British & Irish Lions) British Lions	26–22	Lock	1	31 May 1980	Newlands, Cape Town
13.	(British & Irish Lions) British Lions	12–10	Lock		28 June 1980	Boet Erasmus Stadium, Port Elizabeth
14.	(British & Irish Lions) British Lions	13–17	Lock		12 July 1980	Loftus Versfeld, Pretoria
15.	South American Jaguars	22–13	Lock		18 October 1980	Wanderers Club, Montevideo
16.	South American Jaguars	30–16	Lock		25 October 1980	Prince of Wales Country Club, Santiago
17.	France	37–15	Lock		8 November 1980	Loftus Versfeld, Pretoria

== See also ==
- List of South Africa national rugby union players – Springbok no. 474
- SA Rugby Player of the Year - 1977
