= Joggie Jansen =

South African rugby union footballer (1948–2026)

- Born: Joachim Scholtz Jansen; 5 February 1948 Griekwastad, Cape Province, Union of South Africa
- Died: 30 August 2026 (aged 78) Otjiwarongo, Namibia
- Height: 1.83 m (6 ft 0 in)
- Weight: 86 kg (190 lb)
- School: Griekwastad High School
- University: University of the Free State
- Notable relative: Eben Jansen (brother)

Rugby union career
Provincial / State sides
Years	Team	Apps	(Points)
	Free State	61	
International career
Years	Team	Apps	(Points)
1970–1972	South Africa	10	(3)

Joachim Scholtz "Joggie" Jansen (5 February 1948 – 30 August 2026) was a South African rugby union player.

== Playing career ==
In 1964 as a sixteen-year-old, Jansen played for Griquas at the first ever Craven Week tournament. After leaving school, he went to the University of the Free State and played provincial rugby for Free State and was a member of the Orange Free State team that won the Currie Cup in 1976.

Jansen made his test debut for the Springboks in 1970 against New Zealand at Loftus Versfeld in Pretoria and played in all four tests during the series against the touring All Blacks. Jansen also gained fame in his first Test for his excellent tackle on All Black flyhalf Wayne Cottrell, that helped swing the momentum of the game in favour of the Springboks. In 1971 he played in the test series against France and Australia. His last test match was the losing test against England in 1972. He played in a further five tour matches, scoring five tries to add to his one test try for the Springboks.

== Death ==
Jansen died on 30 August 2026, at the age of 78.

== Test history ==
No.	Opponents	Results (SA 1st)	Position	Tries	Dates	Venue
1.	New Zealand	17–6	Centre		25 July 1970	Loftus Versfeld, Pretoria
2.	New Zealand	8–9	Centre	1	8 August 1970	Newlands, Cape Town
3.	New Zealand	14–3	Centre		29 August 1970	Boet Erasmus Stadium, Port Elizabeth
4.	New Zealand	20–17	Centre		12 September 1970	Ellis Park, Johannesburg
5.	France	22–9	Centre		12 June 1971	Free State Stadium, Bloemfontein
6.	France	8–8	Centre		19 June 1971	Kings Park, Durban
7.	Australia	19–11	Centre		17 July 1971	Sydney Cricket Ground, Sydney
8.	Australia	14–6	Centre		31 July 1971	Brisbane Exhibition Ground, Brisbane
9.	Australia	18–6	Centre		7 August 1971	Sydney Cricket Ground, Sydney
10.	England	9–18	Centre		3 June 1972	Ellis Park, Johannesburg

== See also ==
- List of South Africa national rugby union players – Springbok no. 444
