= Bayvel =

Bayvel is a surname. Notable people with the surname include:

- Paul Bayvel (1949–2020), South African rugby union player
- Polina Bayvel (born 1966), British engineer and academic
