= Stapelberg =

Stapelberg is a surname. Notable people with the surname include:

- Willem Stapelberg (born 1947), South African rugby union player
- Zanne Stapelberg (born 1977), South African musician
