= Johan de Bruyn =

South African rugby union footballer

- Born: Johan de Bruyn; 12 October 1948 (age 78) Reivilo, North West
- Height: 1.93 m (6 ft 4 in)
- Weight: 114 kg (251 lb)
- School: Reivilo High School

Rugby union career
Provincial / State sides
Years	Team	Apps	(Points)
1970–	Free State	40	
International career
Years	Team	Apps	(Points)
1974	South Africa	1	

Johan de Bruyn (born 12 October 1948) is a former South African rugby union player.

== Playing career ==
De Bruyn played his provincial rugby for the Free State. In 1974 he was selected at lock for the Springboks, for the third test against the touring Lions team of Willie John McBride at the Boet Erasmus Stadium in Port Elizabeth. De Bruyn then toured with the Springboks to France at the end of 1974. He did not play any test matches during the French tour but played three tour matches.

=== Test history ===
No.	Opposition	Result (SA 1st)	Position	Tries	Date	Venue
1.	British Lions	9–26	Lock		13 July 1974	Boet Erasmus Stadium, Port Elizabeth

== See also ==
- List of South Africa national rugby union players – Springbok no. 475
- 99 call
