= Sakkie van Zyl =

South African rugby union player

- Full name: Christoffel Gert Petrus van Zyl
- Born: 1 July 1932 Dealesville, South Africa
- Died: 24 November 2017 (aged 85)
- Height: 1.85 m (6 ft 1 in)
- Weight: 99.8 kg (220 lb)

Rugby union career
- Position: Prop
Provincial / State sides
Years	Team	Apps	(Points)
- Orange Free State
International career
Years	Team	Apps	(Points)
1965	South Africa	4	(0)

Christoffel Gert Petrus van Zyl (1 July 1932 – 24 November 2017), known as Sakkie van Zyl, was a South African international rugby union player.

Born in Dealesville, van Zyl got his opportunity play for the Springboks late in his career, turning 33 while a member of their 1965 tour of New Zealand. He had 89 representative appearances for Orange Free State by this time and was given the Springboks vice captaincy against the All Blacks, preferred over former captain Abie Malan to lead the forward pack. In a 1–3 series loss, van Zyl was utilised as a loose–head prop for all four Test matches.

== See also ==
- List of South Africa national rugby union players
