= Moneyglass =

Hamlet in County Antrim, Northern Ireland

Coordinates: 54°46′42″N 6°25′14″W

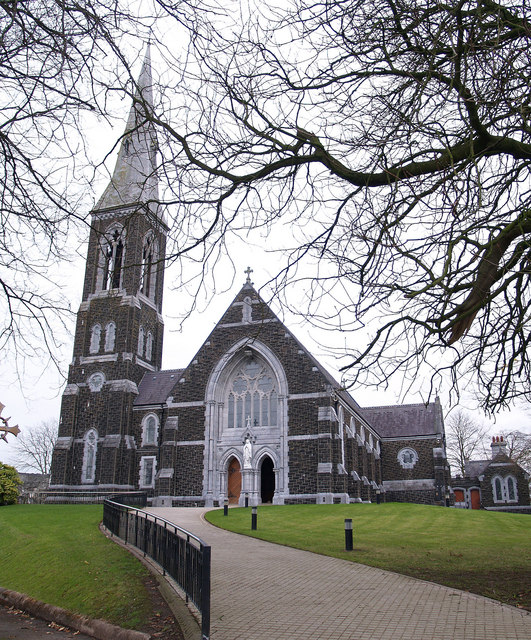
Moneyglass Catholic church

Moneyglass (from Irish Muine Glas, meaning 'Green Thicket') is a hamlet and townland in County Antrim, Northern Ireland. Moneyglass is near Toome and Lough Beg. It had a population of 103 people (38 households) in the 2011 census.

== Notable people ==
- Willie John McBride (born 1940), rugby union player, capped for Ireland on 63 occasions, 12 as captain, is a native of Moneyglass but now lives in Ballyclare.
- Sir Tony McCoy (born 1974), former National Hunt horse racing jockey and 2010 BBC Sports Personality of the Year winner
