= Gert Cilliers =

South African rugby union player

- Full name: Gert Daniël Cilliers
- Born: 28 July 1940 Ficksburg, South Africa
- Died: 26 January 1986 (aged 45)
- Height: 1.83 m (6 ft 0 in)
- Weight: 80.7 kg (178 lb)

Rugby union career
- Position: Winger
Provincial / State sides
Years	Team	Apps	(Points)
- Orange Free State
International career
Years	Team	Apps	(Points)
1963	South Africa	3	(3)

Gert Daniël Cilliers (28 July 1940 – 26 January 1986) was a South African international rugby union player.

Cilliers was born and raised in the Orange Free State town of Ficksburg.

A speedy three–quarter, Cilliers played rugby for the University of the Free State and scored a try against the 1960 All Blacks while representing Central Universities. He began representing Orange Free State during the early 1960s and notably contributed two tries in their 14–14 draw with the 1962 British Lions. In 1963, Cilliers was capped in three Test matches for the Springboks against the touring Wallabies, scoring a try on debut in Pretoria.

Cilliers was a school teacher by profession.

== See also ==
- List of South Africa national rugby union players
