= Kleintjie Grobler =

South African rugby union footballer

- Born: Cornelius Johannes Grobler; 24 August 1944 Pretoria, Gauteng
- Died: 29 September 1999 (aged 55) Pretoria
- Height: 1.89 m (6 ft 2 in)
- Weight: 98 kg (216 lb)
- School: Hoërskool Gerrit Maritz, Pretoria

Rugby union career
Provincial / State sides
Years	Team	Apps	(Points)
1966–1971	Northern Transvaal		
1972–1976	Free State	42	
1977	Western Transvaal		
International career
Years	Team	Apps	(Points)
1974–1975	South Africa	3	(4)

Cornelius Johannes 'Kleintjie' Grobler (24 August 1944 – 29 September 1999) was a South African rugby union player.

== Playing career ==
Grobler made his provincial debut for Northern Transvaal in 1966 and also played provincial rugby for the Free State and Western Transvaal.

Grobler played his first test match for the Springboks as eighthman in the fourth test against the 1974 Lions at Ellis Park in Johannesburg. He toured with the Springboks to France at the end of 1974, without playing in any test matches and in 1975 he played in both tests against France during their tour of South Africa. Grobler played three tests, scoring one try and also four tour matches, scoring two tries for South Africa.

=== Test history ===
No.	Opposition	Result (SA 1st)	Position	Tries	Date	Venue
1.	British Lions	13–13	Number 8		27 July 1974	Ellis Park Stadium, Johannesburg
2.	France	38–25	Flank	1	21 June 1975	Free State Stadium, Bloemfontein
3.	France	33–18	Flank		28 June 1975	Loftus Versfeld, Pretoria

== See also ==
- List of South Africa national rugby union players – Springbok no. 478
