= Paul Bayvel =

South African rugby union player (1949–2020)

- Born: Paul Campbell Robertson Bayvel; 28 March 1949 Johannesburg, South Africa
- Died: 14 April 2020 (aged 71) Hout Bay, Cape Town, South Africa
- Height: 1.72 m (5 ft 8 in)
- Weight: 73 kg (161 lb)
- School: Parktown Boys' High School
- University: University of Witwatersrand

Rugby union career
- Position: Scrum-half
Amateur team(s)
Years	Team	Apps	(Points)
- Wits
–	Diggers		
Provincial / State sides
Years	Team	Apps	(Points)
1972–1980	Transvaal	51	
International career
Years	Team	Apps	(Points)
1974–1976	South Africa	10	

Paul Campbell Robertson Bayvel (28 March 1949 – 14 April 2020) was a South African rugby union player who played for the national team as a scrum-half.

== Playing career ==
Bayvel made his provincial debut for Transvaal in 1972 and in the same year toured with the Gazelles, a South African under 24 team, to Argentina. During the tour, the Gazelles played two matches against the Argentine national team, which are considered test matches for Argentina. Bayvel played in the first of these matches which was won 14–6 by the Gazelles.

He made his test debut for the Springboks on 22 June 1974 at Loftus Versfeld in Pretoria in the second test against the touring British Lions team, in partnership with his provincial flyhalf, Gerald Bosch. Bayvel was injured before the third test but returned to the side for the drawn fourth and final test at his home ground, Ellis Park in Johannesburg. During November 1974, Bayvel toured with the Springboks to France and played in both tests as well as in three tour matches.

In 1975 France toured South Africa, playing eleven matches that include two test matches. Bayvel played in both tests against France and during the 1976 New Zealand tour of South Africa, he played in all four test against the All Blacks.

=== Test history ===
No.	Opposition	Result (SA 1st)	Position	Tries	Date	Venue
1.	British Lions	9–28	Scrum-half	0	22 June 1974	Loftus Versfeld, Pretoria
2.	(British & Irish Lions) British Lions	13–13	Scrum-half	0	27 July 1974	Ellis Park, Johannesburg
3.	France	13–4	Scrum-half	0	23 November 1974	Le stade de Toulouse, Toulouse
4.	France	10–8	Scrum-half	0	30 November 1974	Parc des Princes, Paris
5.	France	38–25	Scrum-half	0	21 June 1975	Free State Stadium, Bloemfontein
6.	France	33–18	Scrum-half	0	28 June 1975	Loftus Versfeld, Pretoria
7.	New Zealand	16–7	Scrum-half	0	24 July 1976	Kings Park Stadium, Durban
8.	New Zealand	9–15	Scrum-half	0	14 August 1976	Free State Stadium, Bloemfontein
9.	New Zealand	15–10	Scrum-half	0	4 September 1976	Newlands Stadium, Cape Town
10.	New Zealand	15–14	Scrum-half	0	18 September 1976	Ellis Park, Johannesburg

== Accolades ==
In 1972, Bayvel was one of the five Young Players of the Year, along with Gerald Bosch, Pikkie du Toit, Dugald MacDonald and Jackie Snyman.

== See also ==
- List of South Africa national rugby union players – Springbok no. 468
