= Abie Malan =

South African rugby union footballer

- Born: Gabriel Frederick Malan; 18 November 1935 Kenhardt, Cape Province, Union of South Africa
- Died: 23 October 2014 (aged 78) South Africa
- Height: 1.82 m (6 ft 0 in)
- Weight: 86 kg (190 lb)
- School: Hoërskool Kenhardt, Kenhardt
- University: Stellenbosch University

Rugby union career
- Position: Hooker
Provincial / State sides
Years	Team	Apps	(Points)
1955–1960	Western Province		
1961–1965	Transvaal		
International career
Years	Team	Apps	(Points)
1958–1965	South Africa	18	(3)

Gabriel Frederick 'Abie' Malan (18 November 1935 – 23 October 2014) was a South African rugby union player.

== Playing career ==
After completing his schooling in Kenhardt, Malan started his tertiary studies at Stellenbosch University in 1954, where he soon was selected for the university's first team. In 1958 he was selected for the South African Universities to tour France. He made his senior provincial debut for Western Province in 1955 and in 1961 he joined Transvaal.

Malan made his test debut for the Springboks against the touring French team on 16 August 1958 at Ellis Park in Johannesburg. Five years later, he was selected as captain for the first test against Australia on 13 July 1963 at Loftus Versfeld in Pretoria. He also played in twenty six tour matches, scoring two tries, to add to his one test try.

=== Test history ===
No.	Opponents	Results (SA 1st)	Position	Tries	Dates	Venue
1.	France	5–9	Hooker		16 Aug 1958	Ellis Park, Johannesburg
2.	New Zealand	13–0	Hooker		25 Jun 1960	Ellis Park, Johannesburg
3.	New Zealand	11–11	Hooker		13 Aug 1960	Free State Stadium, Bloemfontein
4.	New Zealand	8–3	Hooker		27 Aug 1960	Boet Erasmus Stadium, Port Elizabeth
5.	England	5–0	Hooker		07 Jan 1961	Twickenham, London
6.	Scotland	12–5	Hooker		21 Jan 1961	Murrayfield, Edinburgh
7.	France	0–0	Hooker		18 Feb 1961	Colombes Stadium, Paris
8.	British Lions	3–3	Hooker		23 Jun 1962	Ellis Park, Johannesburg
9.	(British & Irish Lions) British Lions	3–0	Hooker		21 Jul 1962	Kings Park, Durban
10.	(British & Irish Lions) British Lions	8–3	Hooker		04 Aug 1962	Newlands, Cape Town
11.	Australia	14–3	Hooker (c)		13 Jul 1963	Loftus Versfeld, Pretoria
12.	Australia	5–9	Hooker (c)		10 Aug 1963	Newlands, Cape Town
13.	Australia	22–6	Hooker (c)	1	7 Sep 1963	Boet Erasmus Stadium, Port Elizabeth
14.	Wales	24–3	Hooker (c)		23 May 1964	Kings Park, Durban
15.	Australia	11–18	Hooker		19 Jun 1965	Sydney Cricket Ground, Sydney
16.	Australia	8–12	Hooker		26 Jun 1965	Lang Park, Brisbane
17.	New Zealand	3–6	Hooker		31 Jul 1965	Athletic Park, Wellington
18.	New Zealand	0–13	Hooker		21 Aug 1965	Carisbrook, Dunedin

== See also ==
- List of South Africa national rugby union players – Springbok no. 345

Sporting positions
Preceded by Avril Malan	Springbok Captain; 1963–1964	Succeeded by Nelie Smith
