= 1969 Currie Cup =

Domestic rugby union competition

- Countries: South Africa
- Champions: Northern Transvaal (4th title)
- Runners-up: Western Province

The 1969 Currie Cup was the 31st edition of the Currie Cup, the premier annual domestic rugby union competition in South Africa.

The tournament was won by Northern Transvaal for the fourth time; they beat Western Province 28–13 in the final in Pretoria.

== Results ==
=== Semi-final ===
Western Province	13–11	Boland	Newlands Stadium, Cape Town, Cape Town
	Report

=== Final ===
Northern Transvaal	28–13	Western Province	Loftus Versfeld, Pretoria, Pretoria
	Report		Referee: Fonnie van der Vyver

== See also ==
- Currie Cup
