= 1981 Currie Cup =

Domestic rugby union competition

- Countries: South Africa
- Champions: Northern Transvaal (13th title)
- Runners-up: Free State

The 1981 Currie Cup was the 43rd edition of the Currie Cup, the premier annual domestic rugby union competition in South Africa.

The tournament was won by Northern Transvaal for the 13th time; they beat Free State 23–6 in the final in Pretoria.

== Results ==
=== Semi-finals ===
Northern Transvaal	36–12	Northern Free State	Loftus Versfeld, Pretoria
	Report

Eastern Transvaal	15–28	Free State	Pam Brink Stadium, Springs
	Report

=== Final ===
Northern Transvaal	23–6	Free State	Loftus Versfeld, Pretoria
	Report		Referee: Johan Gouws

== See also ==
- Currie Cup
