= Jack Gage (rugby union) =

South African-born rugby union player

- Full name: John Harvey Gage
- Born: 2 April 1907 Worcester, Cape Province, South Africa
- Died: 30 June 1989 (aged 82) Margate, Natal, South Africa
- University: Queen's University Belfast

Rugby union career
- Position: Wing
International career
Years	Team	Apps	(Points)
1926–27	Ireland	4	(3)
1933	South Africa	1	(0)

John Harvey Gage (2 April 1907 — 30 June 1989) was a South African rugby union player. A dual-international, Gage represented both Ireland and South Africa during his career.

== Biography ==
Raised in Cape Province, South Africa, Gage was a speedy wing three-quarter, capped four times for Ireland during his studies at Queen's University Belfast. He scored the winning try on debut against Scotland at Murrayfield in 1926, putting Ireland ahead with one minute remaining. Both Ireland and Scotland would go on to share the championship title. After the 1927 Five Nations, Gage left Belfast for a civil service job in Basutoland.

Gage toured with the Junior Springboks to Argentina in 1932 and the following year gained full Springboks representative honours, playing in a win over the Wallabies at Cape Town.

During World War II, Gage served in the Parachute Regiment and was decorated with a Military Cross.

Gage was reported to have still been playing rugby up until the age of 61, for Cape Town's Olympic Sports Club.

== See also ==
- List of Ireland national rugby union players
- List of South Africa national rugby union players
