= Eben Jansen =

South African rugby union footballer

- Born: Eben Jansen; 5 June 1954 (age 72) Griekwastad, Northern Cape, South Africa
- Height: 1.90 m (6 ft 3 in)
- Weight: 106 kg (234 lb)
- School: Griekwastad High School
- University: University of the Free State
- Notable relative: Joggie Jansen (brother)

Rugby union career
- Position: Flank
Provincial / State sides
Years	Team	Apps	(Points)
1976–1986	Free State	125	
1987	Boland	12	
International career
Years	Team	Apps	(Points)
1981	South Africa	1	

Eben-Haeser Jansen (born 5 June 1954 in Griekwastad, Northern Cape, South Africa) is a former South African rugby union player.

== Playing career ==
Jansen played for the Free State in the South African Currie Cup competition. He made his test debut for the Springboks during the 1981 tour of New Zealand in the first test on 15 August 1981 at Lancaster Park in Christchurch. He did not play in any further tests, but represented the Springboks in 10 tour matches and scored four tries.

=== Test history ===
No.	Opposition	Result(SA 1st)	Position	Tries	Date	Venue
1.	New Zealand	9–14	Flank		15 August 1981	Lancaster Park, Christchurch

== See also ==
- List of South Africa national rugby union players – Springbok no. 518
