= Hoërskool Delmas =

Location
- 1 Hendrik Verwoerd Avenue Delmas West; Delmas (Victor Khanye), Mpumalanga; South Africa
- Coordinates: 26°08′50″S 28°40′05″E

Information
- School type: Public & Boarding
- Motto: En ons sing want die lewe is mooi
- Established: 1953
- School district: Nkangala
- Principal: Mr J.F. Davis deputy principal = Mrs E. Smith
- Grades: 8-12
- Gender: Male & Female
- Colours: Blue Red, White, Teal
- Slogan: Goed begin is half gewin
- Mascot: Mielieman
- Nickname: Dellies
- Team name: Dellies
- Accreditation: Mpumalanga Department of Education
- Website: www.delmashs.co.za/wp/

Hoërskool Delmas is a public, tuition-charging, Afrikaans and English language high school located in Delmas, Mpumalanga, South Africa. As of 2014 it had approximately 670 students. Two hostels are located on the premises.

== History ==
The first grade 11 class began in January 1953 and the first matrics was written in December 1954. On 4 February 1956 the corner stone with the text written: “Daar op die rooi bult" was laid. The school grew to about 539 students in 1979 and were the host of their first inter high in 1980.

== Activities ==
=== Sport ===
- Athletics
- Cricket
- Cross Country Running
- Golf
- Hockey
- Netball
- Rugby
- Tennis
