= 1978 Currie Cup =

Domestic rugby union competition

- Countries: South Africa
- Champions: Northern Transvaal (10th title)
- Runners-up: Free State

The 1978 Currie Cup was the 40th edition of the Currie Cup, the premier annual domestic rugby union competition in South Africa.

The tournament was won by Northern Transvaal for the tenth time; they beat Free State 13–9 in the final in Bloemfontein.

== Fixtures and results ==
=== Final ===
1978	Free State	9 - 13	Northern Transvaal	Free State Stadium, Bloemfontein
				Referee: Gert Bezuidenhout
