= 1977 Currie Cup =

Domestic rugby union competition

- Countries: South Africa
- Champions: Northern Transvaal (9th title)
- Runners-up: Free State

The 1977 Currie Cup was the 39th edition of the Currie Cup, the premier annual domestic rugby union competition in South Africa.

The tournament was won by Northern Transvaal for the ninth time; they beat Free State 27–12 in the final in Pretoria.

The semi-final between Northern Transvaal and Western Province was notable for a brutal tackle by Province's Morné du Plessis on Northern Transvaal's Naas Botha. Pierre Edwards slotted the resulting penalty to win the game 17-15, and du Plessis had to be escorted off the field by police in front of the incensed Loftus Versfeld crowd.

== Fixtures and Results ==
=== Final ===
1977	Northern Transvaal	27 - 12	Free State	Loftus Versfeld, Pretoria
				Referee: Jimmy Smith-Belton

== See also ==
- Currie Cup
