= 1974 Currie Cup =

South African rugby competition

- Countries: South Africa
- Champions: Northern Transvaal (7th title)
- Runners-up: Transvaal

The 1974 Currie Cup was the 36th edition of the Currie Cup, the premier annual domestic rugby union competition in South Africa.

The tournament was won by Northern Transvaal for the seventh time; they beat Transvaal 17–15 in the final in Pretoria.

== Results ==
=== Semi-final ===
Transvaal	30–6	Eastern Province	Ellis Park Stadium, Johannesburg
	Report

=== Final ===
Northern Transvaal	17–15	Transvaal	Loftus Versfeld, Pretoria
	Report		Referee: Steve Strydom

== See also ==
- Currie Cup
