= De Wet Ras =

South African rugby union footballer

- Born: Wouter Johannes De Wet Ras; 28 January 1954 (age 72) Harrismith, Free State
- Height: 1.83 m (6 ft 0 in)
- Weight: 84 kg (185 lb)
- School: Harrismith High School
- University: University of the Free State

Rugby union career
- Position(s): Fly-half, Centre
Amateur team(s)
Years	Team	Apps	(Points)
- University of the Free State
Provincial / State sides
Years	Team	Apps	(Points)
1974–1986	Free State	141	(1 707)
1979	Natal	10	
International career
Years	Team	Apps	(Points)
1976–1980	South Africa	2	

Wouter Johannes De Wet Ras (born 28 January 1954 in Harrismith, Free State, South Africa) is a former South African rugby union player.

== Playing career ==
Ras represented the Eastern Free State Schools team at the annual Craven Week tournament for three consecutive years from 1970 to 1972. After school Ras did his National Service in Pretoria and played for the Northern Transvaal's under-20 team. In 1974, Ras enrolled at the University of the Free State and made his senior provincial debut for Free State. He went on to play 141 first class matches for Free State and set a number of provincial records.

Ras played two test matches for South Africa, both as a replacement. His first test match was against New Zealand in 1976 when he substituted Gerald Bosch after 35 minutes in the second half on the first test at Kings Park, Durban. His second test was in 1980 when he replaced Willie du Plessis at centre during the second half of the second test against the South American Jaguars, also at Kings Park. Ras toured with the Springboks to South America in 1980 and played in three tour matches, scoring 69 points (4 tries, 25 conversions and 1 penalty goal)

== See also ==
- List of South Africa national rugby union players – Springbok no. 488
