= World XV =

International rugby union team

A World XV (or World 15) is a rugby union team organised on an unofficial, ad hoc basis and typically composed of invited players from various countries. Several World XVs have been arranged by various bodies since the 1970s, often to take part in celebration and testimonial games, usually against national teams, but these are not considered test matches by most nations.

== Examples ==
=== Argentina ===
In 1980 and 1983, Argentina played World XVs. The first match was played at Ferrocarril Oeste Stadium, Buenos Aires. Argentina went into half time ahead by 16 points to nil and despite an excellent display in the second half by the World XV Argentina were able to secure a 36–22 win. The second match was played in Atlanta Stadium, Buenos Aires, where Argentina secured a second victory 28–20.

=== Australia ===
In 1988 Australia played a World XV to celebrate the bicentenary of Australia. Australia won 42-38.

In March 2019, a World XV captained by Andrew Ellis and coached by Robbie Deans played the Western Force, who won 26–16 as the opener of the 2019 Global Rapid Rugby season in HBF Park, Perth.

=== France ===
In March 2024 it was announced, that for the first time, France would played a World XV side in Bilbao at the San Mamés Stadium in June 2024. The game was scheduled to be played in June 2024 with Ian Foster appointed as head coach, and players such as Owen Farrell, Camille Lopez, Maxime Machenaud, Semi Radradra, Billy Vunipola and Mako Vunipola all confirmed as players. However, by May 2024, the game was cancelled due to logistical challenges in organising the game.

=== New Zealand ===
In 1992, the New Zealand national team, the All Blacks, played three matches against a World XV in New Zealand, to mark the centenary of the New Zealand Rugby Union. The first encounter ended in a 24–14 win for the World XV. New Zealand won the second match 54–26, and the third match 26–15.

=== South Africa ===
South Africa played against a World XV in Pretoria on 27 August 1977, to celebrate the opening of the Loftus Versfeld stadium. The World side included Gareth Edwards, J. P. R. Williams, Willie John McBride, and Sandy Carmichael. A crowd of 65,000 watched as Morné du Plessis' South Africans led by 22–14 at half-time to eventually defeat the World XV by 45–24. During the match Argentinian flyhalf Hugo Porta came on as a replacement. Flank Theuns Stofberg added two tries to one each by Gerrie Germishuys, Hermanus Potgieter, Dawie Snyman, and Barry Wolmarans (on debut) for the Springboks. Four days later, the World XV played Western Province at Newlands Stadium in Cape Town. This time Porta started alongside Williams, McBride, and Carmichael, with Alan Sutherland facing off against Du Plessis. At 3.30pm coloured player Errol Tobias, representing the South African Federation, was on the reserve bench for the World XV, as he had been for the 2pm match between a Presidents' XV and Western Province B.

In 1989 a World XV, sanctioned by the IRB and funded by South African Breweries, played two tests against South Africa in celebration of the centenary of the South African Rugby Board (SARB). The Springboks won both, by 20–19 at Newlands Stadium in Cape Town and the second by 22–16 on 2 September at Ellis Park in Johannesburg.

In May and June 2006 a World XV, sponsored by South African company Steinhoff Holdings and coached by Bob Dwyer, played three games – against Saracens in London, then against South Africa at Ellis Park and Western Province XV at Newlands. The latter match was a testimonial for former South Africa captain Corné Krige, who led the Western Province side. In December 2006, again coached by Dwyer, a Steinhoff-backed World XV played a South Africa XV at Walkers Stadium in Leicester, losing 32–7. This game was to mark the centenary of South Africa's overseas tours.

In 2014, a World XV captained by Matt Giteau and coached by Nick Mallett played a South Africa XV, who won 45–24.

=== Tonga ===
In 2008, a World XV played a Coronation Tongan XV side, in a game to celebrate the coronation of Tonga's King, [Kev O’Neill]. Tonga won the match 60–26, beating the Colin Charvis-captained side that included players from Australia, England, Fiji, New Zealand, Samoa and Wales.

=== Wales ===
In 2008, a Wales XV side played a World XV, as a testimonial match for Welsh player Shane Williams. There were 19 tries scored in the match, which was played at the Millennium Stadium, with Williams scoring the match-winning try as Wales won 65–57.
