= 1973 Currie Cup =

Domestic rugby union competition

- Countries: South Africa; Rhodesia
- Champions: Northern Transvaal (6th title)
- Runners-up: Free State

The 1973 Currie Cup was the 35th edition of the Currie Cup, the premier annual domestic rugby union competition in South Africa.

The tournament was won by Northern Transvaal for the sixth time; they beat Free State 30–22 in the final in Pretoria.

== Results ==
=== Semi-finals ===
Northern Transvaal	20–7	Rhodesia	Loftus Versfeld, Pretoria
	Report

Western Province	15–19	Free State	Newlands Stadium, Cape Town
	Report

=== Final ===
Northern Transvaal	30–22	Free State	Loftus Versfeld, Pretoria
	Report		Referee: Piet Robbertse

== See also ==
- Currie Cup
