= 1975 Currie Cup =

Domestic rugby union competition

- Countries: South Africa
- Champions: Northern Transvaal (8th title)
- Runners-up: Free State

The 1975 Currie Cup was the 37th edition of the Currie Cup, the premier annual domestic rugby union competition in South Africa.

The tournament was won by Northern Transvaal for the eighth time; they beat Free State 12–6 in the final in Bloemfontein.

== Fixtures and Results ==
=== Final ===
| 1975 | Free State | 6 - 12 | Northern Transvaal | Free State Stadium, Bloemfontein |
| | | | | Referee: Justus Moolman |

== See also ==
- Currie Cup
