= Dugald MacDonald =

South Africa international rugby union player

- Born: Dugald Alexander MacDonald; 20 January 1950 (age 76) Mariannhill, KwaZulu-Natal
- Height: 1.85 m (6 ft 1 in)
- Weight: 108 kg (238 lb)
- School: Diocesan College, Cape Town
- University: University of Cape Town

Rugby union career
- Position: Loose-forward
Provincial / State sides
Years	Team	Apps	(Points)
1972–1975	Western Province		
International career
Years	Team	Apps	(Points)
1974	South Africa	1	

Dugald Alexander MacDonald (born 20 January 1950) is a South African former rugby union player of Scottish origins. He played for South Africa against the 1974 British Lions tour to South Africa.

His younger brother Donald was capped for Scotland seven times.

== Biography ==
Based in Cape Town, MacDonald played provincial rugby in South Africa for Western Province from 1972 to 1975. He acted as the President of the University of Cape Town Rugby Club for 15 years with his tenure coming to an end during the first quarter of 2019. His elder son, Dugald MacDonald, played flanker for the Oxford Greyhounds, while his younger son, Alexander MacDonald, played flanker for the University of Cape Town 1st team in 2011 and 2012.

=== Test history ===
No.	Opponents	Results (RSA 1st)	Position	Tries	Dates	Venue
1.	British Lions	9–28	Number 8		22 June 1974	Loftus Versfeld, Pretoria

== See also ==
- List of South Africa national rugby union players – Springbok no. 470

== Bibliography ==
- Bath, Richard (ed.) The Scotland Rugby Miscellany (Vision Sports Publishing Ltd, 2007 ISBN 1-905326-24-6)
