= 1976 Currie Cup =

Domestic rugby union competition

- Countries: South Africa
- Champions: Free State (1st title)
- Runners-up: Western Province

The 1976 Currie Cup was the 38th edition of the Currie Cup, the premier annual domestic rugby union competition in South Africa.

The tournament was won by Free State for the first time; they beat Western Province 33–16 in the final in Bloemfontein.

== Fixtures and Results ==
=== Final ===
1976	Free State	33 - 16	Western Province	Free State Stadium, Bloemfontein
				Referee: Gert Bezuidenhout

== See also ==
- Currie Cup
