= Cheetahs (rugby union) =

South African rugby union team in Bloemfontein, Free State

(South Africa) Cheetahs
- Union: South African Rugby Union
- Emblem: Cheetah
- Founded: 1895; 131 years ago
- Location: Bloemfontein, Free State, South Africa
- Region: Free State; Northern Cape
- Ground(s): Free State Stadium (Capacity: 46,000)
- Coach: François Steyn
- Captain: Neels Volschenk
- Leagues: Challenge Cup; Currie Cup; SA Cup
- 2025–26 (EPCR); 2026 (CC); 2026 (SA): 6th of 6, Pool stage; 2nd of 8, Semi-finals; 3rd of 10, Semi-finals
Team kit	2nd kit

Official website
- www.fscheetahs.co.za

The Cheetahs, known as the Toyota Cheetahs for sponsorship reasons, is a South African professional rugby union team based in Bloemfontein in the Free State Province. They compete annually in the Currie Cup and SA Cup domestically, and have been an invitational team in the European Challenge Cup since 2022–23 season. Formerly known as Orange Free State, they were originally established in 1895.

Between 2006 and 2017, and again in 2020, the Cheetahs were one of five South African (Note: In 2016 and 2017, South Africa expanded to six teams; the 2020 Super Rugby Unlocked season was a separate domestic competition under the Super Rugby name.) franchise teams in the Super Rugby competition, an inter-continental rugby union franchise competition. After being cut from the Super Rugby following the 2017 season, the Cheetahs were admitted to the Pro14, a franchise rugby union competition based in Europe. The Cheetahs, alongside the Southern Kings, competed in the European-based Pro14 from South Africa until the 2019–20 season.

The franchise area encompasses the western half of the Free State Province. Between 2006 and 2015, the Griffons from the eastern half of the Free State and Griquas from the Northern Cape province were Cheetahs franchise partners, but this ended prior to the 2016 Super Rugby season.

== Strip ==
The primary strip for the Toyota Cheetahs is an orange jersey with a white collar and white trim. Black shorts with orange socks and white trim. The colours are representative of the Free State Currie Cup side; orange and white (Free State Cheetahs). The alternative jersey is the same design, though it is a white jersey with an orange collar and orange trim. Black shorts with orange socks and white trim. designed by Lutkin Kemp

== History ==
Prior to South Africa entering franchises into the then Super 12, the domestic Currie Cup sides competed instead. The Free State Cheetahs, one of the sides that make up the current Central Cheetahs, competed in one Super 12 season in 1997. The Free State played 11 matches, winning 5 and losing 6. They placed 7th on the end of season standings.

Proposals by the Central Union franchise and the SEC (Southern and Eastern Cape) franchise were studied for the allocation of a fifth Super Rugby team licence. The Central Union emphasized points to the SARU such as that the region is second only to the Western Province in terms of producing players for the national side. The Central Union noted that they have a strong and stable fanbase that would be able to meet financial and administrative responsibilities and demands of a Super 14 rugby side.

In mid April 2005, the South African Rugby Union announced that the Central Unions franchise would be its fifth team for the expanded Super 14 competition that would begin in 2006. They were awarded the franchise ahead of the Southern and Eastern Cape (see Southern Spears). In the pre-season of their entrance to the new look Super 14 competition, the Cheetahs played both of the other new franchises, new Australian team; the Western Force and 2007 fellow South African team, the Southern Spears. The Cheetahs proved to be the strongest out of the new sides, demolishing the Spears 48 to nil and soundly defeating the Force in Perth.

The Cheetahs played their first game on 10 February, proving they are fighting fit, but were not good enough on the day for the South African Bulls, losing their first official match in Bloemfontein 18 points to 30. The Cheetahs won their first Super 14 game in week two, defeating the Sharks in a thrilling match seeing the Cheetahs win by a single point, 27 to 26. Entering round four of the 2006 season, the Cheetahs were facing the table leaders, the Hurricanes. In a surprise result, the Cheetahs beat the table leaders, thus winning their first home game and proving they deserve to be in the Super 14.

The Cheetahs finally broke their drought in overseas matches with an upset over the New South Wales Waratahs on 19 March 2011.

Following SANZAAR's decision to reduce the number of teams for 2018, the South African Rugby Union announced that the Cheetahs would be one of the teams cut from the 2018 competition. Instead, the Cheetahs joined the previously Northern Hemisphere-exclusive Pro14 competition prior to the 2017–18 season.

The Cheetahs were unable to compete in the 2020–21 Pro14 due to COVID-19 pandemic travel restrictions. Instead, the team played the Super Rugby Unlocked in late 2020 and the Preparation Series in early 2021. However, the Cheetahs were not invited into the Pro14 Rainbow Cup. The Pro14 was rebranded as the United Rugby Championship for the 2021–22, and the team was not selected to enter it.

Since 2022, the Cheetahs play in the EPCR Challenge Cup as an invited team.

== Currie Cup ==
The Orange Free State Rugby Union was established in 1895, but did not make it to their first Currie Cup final appearance until 1973, when they lost to Northern Transvaal 30–22 at Loftus Versfeld. They first won the competition in 1976 and have won the competition a further seven occasions (2005, 2006, 2007, 2016, 2019 & 2023). In the 1990s the side became the Free State Cheetahs. The side has also competed in further domestic competitions including the Vodacom Cup, Bankfin Nite Series, SuperSport Rugby Challenge, Toyota Challenge and SA Cup.

=== Currie Cup finals ===
Season	Winners	Score	Runner-up	Venue
1973	Northern Transvaal	30–22	Orange Free State	Loftus Versfeld, Pretoria
1975	Northern Transvaal	12–6	Orange Free State	Free State Stadium, Bloemfontein
1976	Orange Free State	33–16	Western Province	Free State Stadium, Bloemfontein
1977	Northern Transvaal	27–12	Orange Free State	Loftus Versfeld, Pretoria
1978	Northern Transvaal	13–9	Orange Free State	Free State Stadium, Bloemfontein
1981	Northern Transvaal	23–6	Orange Free State	Loftus Versfeld, Pretoria
1994	Transvaal^{1}	56–35	Orange Free State	Springbok Park, Bloemfontein
1997	Western Province	14–12	Free State Cheetahs^{2}	Newlands, Cape Town
2004	Blue Bulls^{3}	42–33	Free State Cheetahs	Loftus Versfeld, Pretoria
2005	Free State Cheetahs	29–25	Blue Bulls	Loftus Versfeld, Pretoria
2006	Free State Cheetahs	28–28^{4}	Blue Bulls	Free State Stadium, Bloemfontein
2007	Free State Cheetahs	20–18	Golden Lions^{1}	Free State Stadium, Bloemfontein
2009	Blue Bulls	36–24	Free State Cheetahs	Loftus Versfeld, Pretoria
2016	Free State Cheetahs	36–16	Blue Bulls	Free State Stadium, Bloemfontein
2019	Free State Cheetahs	31–28	Golden Lions	Free State Stadium, Bloemfontein
2023	Free State Cheetahs	25–17	Pumas	Free State Stadium, Bloemfontein

^{1} Transvaal are now known as the Golden Lions.
^{2} Orange Free State were renamed the Free State Cheetahs.
^{3} Northern Transvaal were renamed the Blue Bulls.
^{4} Game was a draw after 80+20minutes, thus the cup was shared.

=== Vodacom Cup finals ===
Season	Winners	Score	Runner-up	Venue
2000	Free State	44–24	Griquas	Vodacom Park, Bloemfontein
2008	Blue Bulls	25–21	Free State	Loftus Versfeld, Pretoria
2010	Blue Bulls	31–29	Free State	Loftus Versfeld, Pretoria

=== Bankfin Nite Series finals ===
Season	Winners	Score	Runner-up	Venue
1996	Free State	46–34	Border	Bloemfontein

== Stadium ==
The Cheetahs' home stadium is the Free State Stadium, previously referred to as Vodacom Park for sponsorship purposes, located in Bloemfontein. The stadium had its capacity increased to 48,000 for the 2010 FIFA World Cup. The stadium is the home of Free State rugby as it is also home to the Free State Cheetahs, a Currie Cup side which produces a large number of players for the Cheetahs franchise. A then-capacity crowd of 37,383 watched the Cheetahs in their first official Super 14 match against the Bulls on 10 February 2006.

The Cheetahs also previously played matches at Griquas Park in Kimberley, the home of the Griqualand West Rugby Union, and at North West Stadium in Welkom, the home of the Griffons Rugby Union.

=== Season by season record ===
Competition	Season	Cheetahs seasons											Top try scorer		Top point scorer	
Competition	Season	Pos	Finals	P	W	L	D	F	A	-/+	BP	Pts	Name	Tries	Name	Points
Super 14	2006	10th	–	13	5	8	0	272	367	–95	7	27	(South Africa) Giscard Pieters	5	(South Africa) Meyer Bosman	81
Super 14	2007	11th	–	13	4	8	1	265	342	–77	4	22	3 players	2	(South Africa) Willem de Waal	54
Super 14	2008	13th	–	13	1	12	0	255	428	–173	9	13	(South Africa) Jongi Nokwe	7	(South Africa) Conrad Barnard	47
Super 14	2009	14th	–	13	2	11	0	213	341	–128	3	11	(South Africa) Jongi Nokwe	6	(South Africa) Jacques-Louis Potgieter	59
Super 14	2010	11th	–	13	5	7	1	315	393	–78	4	26	(South Africa) Björn Basson	5	(South Africa) Naas Olivier	112
Super Rugby	2011	11th	–	16	5	11	0	435	437	–2	12	40	(South Africa) Sarel Pretorius	9	(South Africa) Sias Ebersohn	179
Super Rugby	2012	10th	–	16	5	11	0	391	458	–67	10	38	(South Africa) Willie le Roux	7	(South Africa) Johan Goosen	145
Super Rugby	2013	6th	**Qualifying final**	16	10	6	0	382	358	24	6	54	(South Africa) Willie le Roux	6	(South Africa) Burton Francis	62
Super Rugby	2014	14th	–	16	4	11	1	372	527	–155	6	24	(South Africa) Cornal Hendricks	6	(South Africa) Johan Goosen	143
Super Rugby	2015	13th	–	16	4	12	0	247	434	–187	6	22	(South Africa) Boom Prinsloo	8	(South Africa) Joe Pietersen	92
Super Rugby	2016	14th	–	15	4	11	0	377	425	–48	5	21	(South Africa) Sergeal Petersen	9	(South Africa) Fred Zeilinga	79
Super Rugby	2017	13th	—	15	4	11	0	395	551	–156	5	21	(South Africa) Raymond Rhule	6	(South Africa) Fred Zeilinga	108
Pro14	2017–18	3rd	**Quarter-finals**	21	12	9	0	609	554	55	15	63	(South Africa) Makazole Mapimpi	10	(South Africa) Fred Zeilinga	86
Pro14	2018–19	6th	—	21	8	12	1	541	606	–61	12	46	(South Africa) Rabz Maxwane	14	(South Africa) Tian Schoeman	134
Pro14	2019–20	4th	—	13	6	7	0	342	280	+62	7	32	(South Africa) Rhyno Smith	10	(South Africa) Ruan Pienaar	73
Super Rugby Unlocked	2020	4th	—	6	3	2	1	126	106	20	3	17	(South Africa) Rosko Specman	4	(South Africa) Tian Schoeman	36
Preparation Series	2021	2nd Pool A	—	4	3	1	0	159	105	54	2	14	2 players	3	(South Africa) François Steyn	31

- **Bold** indicates current team player

== Current squad ==
The following players have been named in the Cheetahs squad for the 2026–27 EPCR Challenge Cup: (Note: Jandré Nel and Curtly Thomas were named in the original Cheetahs squad, but were announced as departing in October 2026.)

2026–27 Cheetahs Challenge Cup squad
**Props**: (South Africa) Siba Booi; (South Africa) Frankie Dos Reis; (South Africa) Matome Manyama; (South Africa) Tielman Nieuwoudt; (South Africa) Tebogo Nkosi; (South Africa) John Kelly Okonkwo; (South Africa) Ben Pitout; **Hookers**: (South Africa) Vice Hofmyer; (South Africa) Marko Janse van Rensburg; (South Africa) Juandre Schoeman; (South Africa) Juan Smal; (Namibia) **Louis van der Westhuizen**; (South Africa) Stefan Venter; **Locks**: (South Africa) Simon Miller; (South Africa) Victor Sekekete; (South Africa) Pierre-Raymond Uys; (South Africa) Arno van der Merwe; (South Africa) Juan Venter; (South Africa) Carl Wegner	**Back row**: (South Africa) Aidon Davis; (South Africa) Carl Els; (South Africa) Daniel Maartens; (South Africa) Sasko Ndlovu; (South Africa) Siya Ningiza; (South Africa) Ramon Uys; (South Africa) Gideon van der Merwe; (South Africa) Neels Volschenk **(c)**; (South Africa) Sisonke Vumazonke; **Scrum-halves**: (South Africa) **Faf de Klerk**; (South Africa) Marco Jansen van Vuren; (South Africa) Rewan Kruger; (South Africa) Erich Visser; **Fly-halves**: (South Africa) Clayton Blommetjies; (South Africa) Dominic Malgas; (Namibia) **Tiaan Swanepoel**; (Scotland) **Jaco van der Walt**; (South Africa) Ethan Wentzel	**Centres**: (South Africa) De-An Ackermann; (South Africa) Carel-Jan Coetzee; (South Africa) Zander du Plessis; (South Africa) Jooste Nel; **Wings**: (South Africa) Ntokozo Makhaza; (South Africa) Prince Nkabinde; **Fullbacks**: (South Africa) Michael Annies; (South Africa) Cohen Jasper; (South Africa) Henry Immelman; (South Africa) Shaun Ray
**(c)** denotes the team captain. **Bold** denotes internationally capped players. * denotes players qualified to play for South Africa on residency or dual nationality. Source:

The following players have been included so far in the Cheetahs squad for the 2026 Currie Cup Premier Division:

2026 Cheetahs Currie Cup squad
**Props**: (Namibia) **Aranos Coetzee**; (South Africa) Frankie Dos Reis; (South Africa) Matome Manyama; (South Africa) Tielman Nieuwoudt; (South Africa) Tebogo Nkosi; (South Africa) John Kelly Okonkwo; (South Africa) Ben Pitout; **Hookers**: (South Africa) Vice Hofmyer; (South Africa) Marko Janse van Rensburg; (South Africa) Juan Smal; (Namibia) **Louis van der Westhuizen**; (South Africa) Stefan Venter; **Locks**: (South Africa) Simon Miller; (South Africa) Victor Sekekete; (South Africa) Curtly Thomas; (South Africa) Pierre-Raymond Uys; (South Africa) Arno van der Merwe; (South Africa) Juan Venter; (South Africa) Carl Wegner	**Back row**: (South Africa) Aidon Davis; (South Africa) Daniel Maartens; (South Africa) Mihlali Mosi; (South Africa) Sasko Ndlovu; (South Africa) Siya Ningiza; (South Africa) Ramon Uys; (South Africa) Gideon van der Merwe; (South Africa) Neels Volschenk **(c)**; (South Africa) Sisonke Vumazonke; **Scrum-halves**: (South Africa) **Faf de Klerk**; (South Africa) Marco Jansen van Vuren; (South Africa) Rewan Kruger; (South Africa) Jandré Nel; (South Africa) Christiaan van der Westhuizen; (South Africa) Erich Visser; **Fly-halves**: (South Africa) Clayton Blommetjies; (Namibia) **Tiaan Swanepoel**; (Scotland) **Jaco van der Walt**; (South Africa) Ethan Wentzel	**Centres**: (South Africa) De-An Ackermann; (South Africa) Carel-Jan Coetzee; (South Africa) Zander du Plessis; (South Africa) Munier Hartzenberg; (South Africa) Jooste Nel; **Wings**: (South Africa) Ntokozo Makhaza; (South Africa) Prince Nkabinde; **Fullbacks**: (South Africa) Michael Annies; (South Africa) Cohen Jasper; (South Africa) Henry Immelman; (South Africa) Litha Nkula; (South Africa) Shaun Ray
**(c)** denotes the team captain. **Bold** denotes internationally capped players. * denotes players qualified to play for South Africa on residency or dual nationality. Source:

== Coaches ==
- (South Africa) Rassie Erasmus (2006–2007)
- (South Africa) Naka Drotské (2008–2015)
- (South Africa) Franco Smith (2016–2017)
- (South Africa) Rory Duncan (2017–2018)
- (South Africa) Franco Smith (2018–2019)
- (South Africa) Hawies Fourie (2019–2024)
- (South Africa) Izak van der Westhuizen (2024–2025)
- (South Africa) François Steyn (2025–present)

== Captains ==
- (South Africa) Juan Smith (2006–2011)
- (South Africa) Adriaan Strauss (2012–2014)
- (South Africa) Francois Uys (2015)
- (South Africa) Francois Venter (2016–2018)
- (South Africa) Oupa Mohojé (2018)
- (South Africa) Tian Meyer (2018–2019)
- (South Africa) Ruan Pienaar (2020–2022)
- (South Africa) Victor Sekekete (2022–present)

== Former players ==
=== Springboks ===
The following players have represented South Africa while representing the Cheetahs:

Name	Year
Boetie McHardy	1912
Hennie Potgieter	1928
Tiny Francis	1931/32
Jack Gage	1933
Lappies Hattingh	1933
Flip Geel	1949
Piet Wessels	1951/52
Basie Vivier	1956
Harry Walker	1953
Popeye Strydom	1955
Chris de Wilzem	1956
Bennie van Niekerk	1960/61
Gert Cilliers	1963
Nelie Smith	1963
John Wessels	1965
Piet Goosen	1965
Sakkie van Zyl	1965
Louis Slabber	1965

Name	Year
Piet Greyling	1967
Joggie Jansen	1970
Jackie Snyman	1974
Gerrie Germishuys	1974
Leon Vogel	1974
Jan Schlebusch	1974
Johan de Bruyn	1974
Gerrie Sonnekus	1974
Kleintjie Grobler	1974
Rampie Stander	1974
André Bestbier	1974
Edrich Krantz	1976
De Wet Ras	1976
Theuns Stofberg	1976
Hermanus Potgieter	1977
Dirk Froneman	1977
Barry Wolmarans	1977
Martiens le Roux	1980
Gysie Pienaar	1980

Name	Year
Eben Jansen	1981
Rudi Visagie	1984
Jaco Reinach	1986
Christo Ferreira	1986
Helgard Müller	1986
André Joubert	1989
Johan Styger	1992
Ruben Kruger	1993
Hentie Martens	1993
Naka Drotské	1993
Ollie le Roux	1994
Brendan Venter	1994
Chris Badenhorst	1994
Os du Randt	1994
André Venter	1996
Werner Swanepoel	1997
Rassie Erasmus	1997
Jannie de Beer	1997
Braam Els	1997

Name	Year
Willie Meyer	1997
Hendro Scholtz	2002
Friedrich Lombard	2002
CJ van der Linde	2002
Juan Smith	2003
Gerrie Britz	2004
Hanyani Shimange	2004
Michael Claassens	2004
Gurthro Steenkamp	2004
Meyer Bosman	2005
Bevin Fortuin	2006
Kabamba Floors	2006
Jannie du Plessis	2007
Barend Pieterse	2007
Adriaan Strauss	2008
Jongi Nokwe	2008
Heinrich Brüssow	2008
Wian du Preez	2009
Coenie Oosthuizen	2010

Name	Year
Ashley Johnson	2010
Johan Goosen	2012
Raymond Rhule	2012
Trevor Nyakane	2013
Piet van Zyl	2013
Cornal Hendricks	2014
Lood de Jager	2014
Oupa Mohoje	2014
Francois Venter	2016
Uzair Cassiem	2016
Ox Nché	2018
Rosko Specman	2021

== Records ==
=== Pro14 records ===
The Cheetahs' Pro14 records are as follows (updated 11 February 2018):

Team Match Records
Record	Opposition	Venue	Season	
Biggest win:	Southern Kings	Nelson Mandela Bay Stadium, Port Elizabeth	2017–18	24
Heaviest defeat:	Munster	Thomond Park, Limerick	2017–18	33
Highest score:	Zebre	Free State Stadium, Bloemfontein	2017–18	54
Most points conceded:	Munster	Thomond Park, Limerick	2017–18	51
Most tries:	Zebre	Free State Stadium, Bloemfontein	2017–18	8
Most tries conceded:	Munster	Thomond Park, Limerick	2017–18	8

Player Match Records
Record	Player	Opposition	Venue	Season	
Most points by a player:	Ernst Stapelberg	Leinster	Free State Stadium, Bloemfontein	2017–18	18
Most tries by a player:	Nico Lee	Southern Kings	Nelson Mandela Bay Stadium, Port Elizabeth	2017–18	3
Most conversions by a player:	Ernst Stapelberg	Zebre	Free State Stadium, Bloemfontein	2017–18	7
Most penalties by a player:	Ernst Stapelberg	Leinster	Free State Stadium, Bloemfontein	2017–18	4
Most penalties by a player:	Ernst Stapelberg	Glasgow Warriors	Free State Stadium, Bloemfontein	2017–18	4
Most drop goals by a player:	No drop goals yet				

Team Season Records
Record	Matches	Season	
Most team points:	in 14 matches	2017–18	430
Most team tries:	in 14 matches	2017–18	53

Player Season Records
Record	Player	Season	
Most points by a player:	Fred Zeilinga	2017–18	79
Most tries by a player:	Makazole Mapimpi	2017–18	10
Most conversions by a player:	Fred Zeilinga	2017–18	21
Most penalties by a player:	Ernst Stapelberg	2017–18	14
Most drop goals by a player:	No drop goals yet		

Player Career Records
Record	Player	Seasons	
Most appearances:	Rynier Bernardo	2017–18	14
Most appearances:	Aranos Coetzee	2017–18	14
Most appearances:	Charles Marais	2017–18	14
Most appearances:	Ox Nché	2017–18	14
Most appearances:	Shaun Venter	2017–18	14
Most points:	Fred Zeilinga	2017–18	79
Most tries:	Makazole Mapimpi	2017–18	10
Most conversions:	Fred Zeilinga	2017–18	21
Most penalties:	Ernst Stapelberg	2017–18	14
Most drop goals:	No drop goals yet		

=== Super Rugby records ===
The Cheetahs' Super Rugby records are as follows:

Team Match Records
Record	Opposition	Venue	Season	
Biggest win:	Sunwolves	Free State Stadium, Bloemfontein	2016	75
Heaviest defeat:	Hurricanes	Westpac Stadium, Wellington	2017	54
Highest score:	Sunwolves	Free State Stadium, Bloemfontein	2016	92
Most points conceded:	Brumbies	Canberra Stadium, Canberra	2010	61
Most points conceded:	Hurricanes	Westpac Stadium, Wellington	2010	61
Most tries:	Sunwolves	Free State Stadium, Bloemfontein	2016	14
Most tries conceded:	Brumbies	Canberra Stadium, Canberra	2010	9
Most tries conceded:	Hurricanes	Westpac Stadium, Wellington	2010	9

Player Match Records
Record	Player	Opposition	Venue	Season	
Most points by a player:	Meyer Bosman	Stormers	Newlands Stadium, Cape Town	2006	26
Most tries by a player:	Rayno Benjamin	Stormers	Free State Stadium, Bloemfontein	2011	3
Most tries by a player:	Sergeal Petersen	Sunwolves	Free State Stadium, Bloemfontein	2016	3
Most tries by a player:	Sarel Pretorius	Hurricanes	Free State Stadium, Bloemfontein	2011	3
Most tries by a player:	Paul Schoeman	Sunwolves	Free State Stadium, Bloemfontein	2016	3
Most tries by a player:	Riaan Viljoen	Lions	Ellis Park Stadium, Johannesburg	2011	3
Most conversions by a player:	Niel Marais	Sunwolves	Free State Stadium, Bloemfontein	2016	8
Most penalties by a player:	Meyer Bosman	Stormers	Newlands Stadium, Cape Town	2006	8
Most drop goals by a player:	Sias Ebersohn	Hurricanes	Free State Stadium, Bloemfontein	2011	2
Most drop goals by a player:	Riaan Viljoen	Brumbies	Free State Stadium, Bloemfontein	2011	2

Team Season Records
Record	Matches	Season	
Most team points:	in 16 matches	2011	435
Most team tries:	in 15 matches	2016	47

Player Season Records
Record	Player	Season	
Most points by a player:	Sias Ebersohn	2011	179
Most tries by a player:	Sergeal Petersen	2016	9
Most tries by a player:	Sarel Pretorius	2011	9
Most conversions by a player:	Sias Ebersohn	2011	32
Most penalties by a player:	Sias Ebersohn	2011	33
Most drop goals by a player:	Sias Ebersohn	2011	2
Most drop goals by a player:	Naas Olivier	2010	2
Most drop goals by a player:	Joe Pietersen	2015	2
Most drop goals by a player:	Riaan Viljoen	2011	2

Player Career Records
Record	Player	Seasons	
Most appearances:	Adriaan Strauss	2007–2014	97
Most points:	Johan Goosen	2012–2014	331
Most tries:	Sarel Pretorius	2009–2015	24
Most conversions:	Johan Goosen	2012–2014	46
Most penalties:	Johan Goosen	2012–2014	70
Most drop goals:	Sias Ebersohn	2010–2011	2
Most drop goals:	Naas Olivier	2009–2010	2
Most drop goals:	Joe Pietersen	2015	2
Most drop goals:	Riaan Viljoen	2010–2011	2

== See also ==
- Rugby union in South Africa
