= 1974 British Lions tour to South Africa =

Undefeated rugby union tour

- Date: 15 May – 27 July
- Coach: (Ireland) Syd Millar
- Tour captain: (Ireland) Willie John McBride
- Test series winners: British Lions (3–0)
- Top test point scorer: (Wales) Phil Bennett (26)
Summary
| P | W | D | L |
Total
| 22 | 21 | 1 | 0 |
Test match
| 4 | 3 | 1 | 0 |
Opponent
| P | W | D | L |
South Africa
| 4 | 3 | 1 | 0 |

Tour chronology
- ← New Zealand 1971 New Zealand 1977 →

In 1974, the British & Irish Lions toured South Africa, with matches in South West Africa and Rhodesia. Under the leadership of Willie John McBride, the Lions went through the tour undefeated, winning 21 of their 22 matches and being held to a draw in the final match, albeit in controversial circumstances. The 1974 squad became known as 'The Invincibles' and regarded as the greatest rugby tour in history.

== Apartheid backdrop and controversy ==
The Lions tour took place against the backdrop of widespread condemnation of the apartheid regime. Under pressure from other African nations, the International Olympic Committee had excluded South Africa from competing in the Summer Games since 1964, and there had also been protests against visiting sporting teams from South Africa.

Several rugby players, like Welsh flanker John Taylor, took a stand against apartheid by making themselves unavailable for squad selection. Gerald Davies declined the tour on his personal uncomfortable position at the consequences and realities of apartheid.

By November 1973, the United Nations had declared apartheid "a crime against humanity" and in November 1974 South Africa was suspended from participating in the General Assembly.

The Lions made one more tour during Apartheid (in 1980), and did not tour South Africa again until 1997.

== The 99 call ==
The test series was beset by violence. The management of the Lions unilaterally declared that in their opinion the Springboks dominated their opponents with physical aggression because of their famous size advantage, 'off the ball' and 'blind side' play. In the buildup games, and in McBride's previous tours of South Africa, provincial sides had tended to use their physical size, late tackling and dirty play to deliberately intimidate and injure Lions players prior to Test matches. McBride again saw this tactic of targeting certain players being used by the provinces in 1974, and decided that the '99 call' (originally the '999 call' but it was too slow to shout out) was meant to show that the Lions were a team and would not take any more of the violence being meted out to them. It was intended to show that the Lions would act as one and fight unsporting behaviour with more of the same. The idea was that the referee would be unlikely to send off all of the Lions if they all attacked.

At the 'Battle of Boet Erasmus Stadium', in Port Elizabeth, one of the most violent matches in rugby history, there is famous video footage of J. P. R. Williams running over half the length of the pitch to launch himself at Moaner van Heerden after such a call. According to McBride, the 99 call was only used once, as it sent out the message that the Lions were willing and more than able to respond in kind and protect themselves.

== Squad ==
=== Management ===
- Manager: Alun Thomas (Wales)
- Coach: Syd Millar (Ireland)

=== Backs ===
Fullbacks

- J. P. R. Williams (London Welsh and Wales)
- Andy Irvine (Heriot's FP and Scotland)

Wings

- Tom Grace (St Mary's College RFC and Ireland)
- J. J. Williams (Llanelli and Wales)
- William Steele (Bedford and R.A.F. and Scotland)
- Clive Rees (London Welsh and Wales)
- Alan Morley (Bristol and England) as replacement

Centres

- Richard Milliken (Bangor and Ireland)
- Ian McGeechan (Headingley and Scotland)
- Roy Bergiers (Llanelli and Wales)
- Geoff Evans (Coventry and England)

Fly-halves

- Phil Bennett (Llanelli and Wales)
- Alan Old (Leicester and England)
- Mike Gibson (North of Ireland FC and Ireland) as replacement

Scrum-halves

- Gareth Edwards (Cardiff and Wales)
- John Moloney (St. Mary's College and Ireland)

=== Forwards ===
Hookers

- Bobby Windsor (Pontypool and Wales)
- Ken Kennedy (London Irish and Ireland)

Props

- Ian McLauchlan (Jordanhill College RFC and Scotland)
- Sandy Carmichael (West of Scotland and Scotland)
- Fran Cotton (Coventry and England)
- Mike Burton (Gloucester and England)

Locks

- Willie John McBride (capt) (Ballymena and Ireland)
- Chris Ralston (Richmond and England)
- Gordon Brown (West of Scotland and Scotland)
- Roger Uttley (Gosforth and England)

Loose forwards

- Fergus Slattery (Blackrock College and Ireland)
- Stewart McKinney (Dungannon and Ireland)
- Tommy David (Llanelli and Wales)
- Tony Neary (Broughton Park and England)
- Andy Ripley (Rosslyn Park and England)
- Mervyn Davies (Swansea and Wales)

== Results summary ==
| | Date | Opponent | Location | Result | Score |
|---|---|---|---|---|---|
| Tour Match 1 | 15 May | Western Transvaal | Potchefstroom | Won | 59–13 |
| Tour Match 2 | 18 May | South West Africa | Windhoek | Won | 23–16 |
| Tour Match 3 | 22 May | Boland | Wellington | Won | 23–6 |
| Tour Match 4 | 25 May | Eastern Province | Port Elizabeth | Won | 28–14 |
| Tour Match 5 | 29 May | South West Districts | Mossel Bay | Won | 97–0 |
| Tour Match 6 | 1 June | Western Province | Cape Town | Won | 17–8 |
| Tour Match 7 | 4 June | SA Federation XV (Proteas) | Goodwood, Cape Town | Won | 37–6 |
| First Test | 8 June | South Africa | Cape Town | Won | 12–3 |
| Tour Match 8 | 11 June | Southern Universities | Cape Town | Won | 26–4 |
| Tour Match 9 | 15 June | Transvaal | Johannesburg | Won | 23–15 |
| Tour Match 10 | 18 June | Rhodesia | Salisbury | Won | 42–6 |
| Second Test | 22 June | South Africa | Pretoria | Won | 28–9 |
| Tour Match 11 | 27 June | Quaggas | Johannesburg | Won | 20–16 |
| Tour Match 12 | 29 June | Orange Free State | Bloemfontein | Won | 11–9 |
| Tour Match 13 | 3 July | Griqualand West | Kimberley | Won | 69–16 |
| Tour Match 14 | 6 July | Northern Transvaal | Pretoria | Won | 16–12 |
| Tour Match 15 | 9 July | SA Africans (Leopards) | East London | Won | 56–10 |
| Third Test | 13 July | South Africa | Port Elizabeth | Won | 26–9 |
| Tour Match 16 | 17 July | Border | East London | Won | 26–6 |
| Tour Match 17 | 20 July | Natal | Durban | Won | 34–6 |
| Tour Match 18 | 23 July | Eastern Transvaal | Springs | Won | 33–10 |
| Fourth Test | 27 July | South Africa | Johannesburg | Draw | 13–13 |

== Test matches ==
=== First test ===
In muddy conditions at Newlands, the Lions took a while to settle, conceding the lead for the first time on the tour before steadying to win the opening test comfortably.

8 June 1974

| South Africa | 3–12 | British Lions |
| Drop: Snyman | | Pen: Bennett (3); Drop: Edwards |

Newlands Stadium
Referee: M. Baise (South Africa

South Africa: Ian McCallum, Chris Pope, Johan Oosthuizen, Peter Whipp, Gert Muller, Dawie Snyman, Roy McCallum, Morne du Plessis, Jan Ellis, Jan Boland Coetzee, John Williams, Kevin de Klerk, Hannes Marais (c), Piston van Wyk, Sakkie Sauerman

Lions: J. P. R. Williams, Steele, Milliken, McGeechan, J. J. Williams, Bennett, Edwards, Davies, Uttley, Slattery, Brown, McBride (c), Cotton, Windsor, McLauchlan

=== Second test ===
The Lions went in at half-time with a 10–3 advantage, thanks to two tries from J. J. Williams. The lead was reduced to 10–6 when Bosch scored a penalty early in the second half, but that was as close as the Springboks came. Thereafter the Lions took control, with tries to Bennett, Brown and Milliken. It was up to that point the heaviest defeat in Springbok history.

22 June 1974

| South Africa | 9–28 | British Lions |
| Pen: Bosch (2); Drop: Bosch | | Try: J. J. Williams (2); Bennett; Brown; Milliken; Con: Bennett; Pen: Bennett; Drop: Ian McGeechan |

Loftus Versfeld Stadium
Attendance: 63,000
Referee: C. de Bruyn (South Africa)

South Africa: Ian McCallum (replaced Snyman, replaced Vogel), Chris Pope, Jackie Snyman, Peter Whipp, Gerrie Germishuys, Gerald Bosch, Paul Bayvel, Dugald MacDonald, Jan Ellis, Morne du Plessis, John Williams, Kevin de Klerk, Hannes Marais (c), Dave Frederickson, Nic Bezuidenhoudt

Lions: J. P. R. Williams, Steele, Milliken, McGeechan, JJ Williams, Bennett, Edwards, Davies, Uttley, Slattery, Brown, McBride (c), Cotton, Windsor, McLauchlan

=== Third test ===
Following the humiliation of Pretoria, the Springbok selectors made drastic changes, keeping only five players from the previous match in the starting line-up. One of the most bizarre changes, however, involved bringing in Free State loose forward Gerrie Sonnekus to play out of position at scrumhalf, a move which had disastrous consequences. In the opening half-hour, the Springboks produced their best rugby of the series so far, and the desperation with which they played prompted Lions centre Dick Milliken to reflect years later that he had "never experienced such intensity on a rugby pitch". Much like the earlier match against Eastern Province at the same venue, the occasion was marred by outbreaks of violence, such that the match has since been dubbed the 'Battle of Boet Erasmus'. The brawling was probably fueled by the win-at-all-costs mentality with which the Springboks were playing, as well as the resolution of the Lions players not to be cowed by their opponents' famed physicality. Despite the Springboks having the better of most of the first half, they still went into the main break down 7–3 after Gordon Brown snatched the ball from a lineout and crashed over the line in injury time.

After the initial onslaught, the Lions regrouped and as the Springboks began to tire, they took complete control in the second half. As the forwards began to assert themselves, the backs were able to launch attack after attack on the Springbok line. Winger J. J. Williams scored two superb tries; the first came from a brilliant one-two pass combination with J. P. R. Williams, and the second was the result of a brilliant kick-and-chase.

At the end of the match, Lions captain McBride was carried off on the shoulders of Bobby Windsor and Gordon Brown. It was the first time since 1896 that the British Isles had won a series in South Africa, and the first time since 1910 that a touring side had beaten the Springboks at Boet Erasmus stadium. Danie Craven, the president of the South African Rugby Board, congratulated the Lions on their historic achievement, acknowledging that the visitors had indeed been "the better team".

13 July 1974

| South Africa | 9–26 | British Lions |
| Pen: Snyman (3) | | Try: Brown; J. J. Williams (2); Con: Irvine; Pen: Irvine (2); Drop: Bennett (2) |

Boet Erasmus Stadium
Attendance: 55,000
Referee: C. de Bruyn (South Africa)

South Africa: 15 Tonie Roux, 14 Chris Pope, 13 Peter Cronje, 12 Jan Schlebusch, 11 Gert Muller, 10 Jackie Snyman, 9 Gerrie Sonnekus, 8 Klippies Kritzinger, 7 Jan Ellis, 6 Polla Fourie, 5 Johan de Bruyn, 4 Moaner van Heerden (replaced by De Klerk), 3 Hannes Marais (c), 2 Piston van Wyk, 1 Nic Bezuidenhoudt; Replacements: 16 Kevin de Klerk, 17 Malcolm Swanby, 18 Gavin Cowley, 19 Gert Schutte, 20 Andre Bestbier, 21 Rampie Stander

Lions: 15 J. P. R. Williams, 14 Andy Irvine, 13 Ian McGeechan, 12 Dick Milliken, 11 J. J. Williams, 10 Phil Bennett, 9 Gareth Edwards, 8 Mervyn Davies, 7 Fergus Slattery, 6 Roger Uttley, 5 Willie John McBride (c), 4 Gordon Brown, 3 Fran Cotton, 2 Bobby Windsor, 1 Ian McLauchlan; Replacements: 16 Mike Gibson, 17 Billy Steele, 18 John Moloney, 19 Ken Kennedy, 20 Sandy Carmichael, 21 Tony Neary

=== Fourth test ===
After winning the first three test matches, the Lions drew the final test in controversial circumstances. In the dying minutes, Irish flanker Fergus Slattery broke through the South African line and appeared to successfully ground the ball, only for the (South African) referee to adjudge it held up; the Lions couldn't believe it, and Slattery himself later stated to the British newspapers that even the South African players thought that he had scored a legitimate try. Moreover, the referee blew the final whistle four minutes early with the Lions still just two metres from the South African try line, thus preserving their unbeaten record, but denying them a tour whitewash. When asked about the decision afterward, the referee was said to have replied: "Look boys, I have to live here". J. P. R. Williams later recalled that he struggled to understand the elation that South Africans felt in drawing the match.

27 July 1974

| South Africa | 13–13 | British Lions |
| Try: Cronje; Pen: Snyman (3) | | Try: Uttley; Irvine; Con: Bennett; Pen: Irvine |

Ellis Park Stadium
Attendance: 75,000
Referee: M. Baise (South Africa)

South Africa: Tonie Roux, Chris Pope, Peter Cronje, Jan Schlebusch, Gert Muller, Jackie Snyman, Paul Bayvel, Kleintjie Grobler, Jan Ellis, Klippies Kritzinger, John Williams, Moaner van Heerden, Hannes Marais (c), Piston van Wyk, Nic Bezuidenhoudt (replaced by Stander)

Lions: J. P. R. Williams, Irvine, McGeechan, Milliken, J. J. Williams, Bennett, Edwards, Davies, Uttley, Slattery, Ralston, McBride (c), Cotton, Windsor, McLauchlan

== Appraisal ==
The Lions previous series in South Africa had all been losses, apart from the drawn 1955 series.

South Africa had not lost a home Test series since 1958 against France. In their most recent internationals they had won series against NZ at home in 1970 and against Australia away in 1971. They won their subsequent series, against NZ at home, in 1976.

However, they had not played a test match for two years before playing the Lions.

Danie Craven said the 1974 Lions were "the greatest team to visit South Africa".

Many of the players who also played on the victorious 1971 Lions tour to New Zealand believe the 1974 Lions team would have beaten the 1971 Lions team, due to having better forwards and because many of the 1971 players had become better players by 1974. J. P. R. Williams has said that whilst the 1971 Lions back division could not be bettered, the 1974 squad was better at winning games.

== Bibliography ==
- Alfred, Luke (2014). When the Lions Came to Town: The 1974 Rugby Tour to South Africa. Zebra Press. p. 264. ISBN 978-1770226531.
- Jenkins, Vivian (1975). Rothmans Rugby Yearbook 1975–76. Brickfield Publications. ISBN 0-362-00221-5.
- Reason, John (1974). The unbeaten Lions: The 1974 British Isles Rugby Union tour of South Africa. Rugby Books. p. 258. ISBN 9780903194020.
- Thomas, J. B. G. (1974). The greatest Lions : the story of the British Lions tour of South Africa, 1974. London: Pelham. p. 175. ISBN 0720707862.
