= EPRU Stadium =

Stadium in Port Elizabeth, South Africa

- The Boet
- Interactive map of EPRU Stadium
- Full name: Eastern Province Rugby Union Stadium
- Former names: Boet Erasmus Stadium
- Location: La Roche Drive; Summerstrand; Port Elizabeth; South Africa
- Coordinates: 33°58′55″S 25°38′22″E
- Owner: Nelson Mandela Metropolitan Municipality
- Operator: Eastern Province Rugby Union
- Capacity: 33,852
- Surface: Grass
- Field size: 100m X 70m

Construction
- Built: 1958–1960
- Opened: 1960
- Closed: 2010
- Demolished: 2019

Tenants
- Mighty Elephants (Currie Cup) (1959 - 2010); Bay United (PSL/NFD) (2008 - 2010)

EPRU Stadium, also known by its original name of Boet Erasmus Stadium, was a stadium in Port Elizabeth, South Africa. The letters "EPRU" in the name represent the Eastern Province Rugby Union, the stadium's historic primary tenants, whose team is now known as the Mighty Elephants. The original name Boet Erasmus Stadium was named after Boet Erasmus, a former mayor of Port Elizabeth. It had a capacity of 33,852 people and served primarily as a venue for rugby union matches but also hosted a number of association football (soccer) fixtures.

The stadium closed in 2010 and was demolished in 2019.

== Background ==
=== Music ===
On 6 March 2007, Irish vocal pop band Westlife held a concert during The Love Tour, in-support of their record, The Love Album.

French Canadian singer Céline Dion performed for over 17,000 people on 27 February 2008 during her Taking Chances World Tour.

=== Rugby ===
Boet Erasmus stadium was primarily used as the home of rugby in the Eastern Cape. Situated in the affluent suburb of Summerstrand, it hosted matches at Test, Super Rugby, Currie Cup, Vodacom Cup and club level. It was regularly used by the Eastern Province Elephants under their previous names, the Mighty Elephants and the Eastern Province Kings and hosted their two home matches during the 1994 Super 10 season. The stadium was also the intended home of the Southern Spears, a team that was scheduled to play in the 2006 Currie Cup in preparation for its admission to the Super Rugby starting in 2007. However, the Spears were later denied entry into both competitions.

The stadium is credited for being the first stomping ground of a number of Springbok legends, included in which are Danie Gerber, Garth Wright, Frans Erasmus and Hannes Marais.

==== The Battle of Boet Erasmus ====
In 1974, during the 1974 British Lions tour to South Africa, one of the most violent matches in rugby history was dubbed the "Battle of Boet Erasmus Stadium". After a 99 call by Lions, there is famous video footage of J. P. R. Williams running over half of the pitch and launching himself at Moaner van Heerden, something that Williams says he is not proud of. Gordon Brown hit his opposite number, Johan de Bruyn, so hard that the Orange Free State man's glass eye flew out and landed in the mud.

At the 1995 Rugby World Cup on 3 June 1995, South Africa took on Canada in a clash that has also sometimes been dubbed the Battle of Boet Erasmus. The match, which South Africa ultimately won 20–0, was marred by an on-field scuffle with four players involved in a brawl. South Africa hooker James Dalton, who had come to the aid of a teammate who had been struck on the back of the head, and winger Pieter Hendriks were suspended for the remainder of the tournament for their roles in the incident and could only watch from the sidelines as the nation went on to claim its first Rugby World Cup title.

=== Soccer ===
The stadium was used as the home ground for Port Elizabeth's, Bay United F.C. who moved to the stadium for their 2008/2009 season in the Premier Soccer League. The club used the stadium again at times during their 2009/2010 campaign in the National First Division. This was due to availability problems with their preferred home ground, the Westbourne Oval.

== Closure and abandonment ==
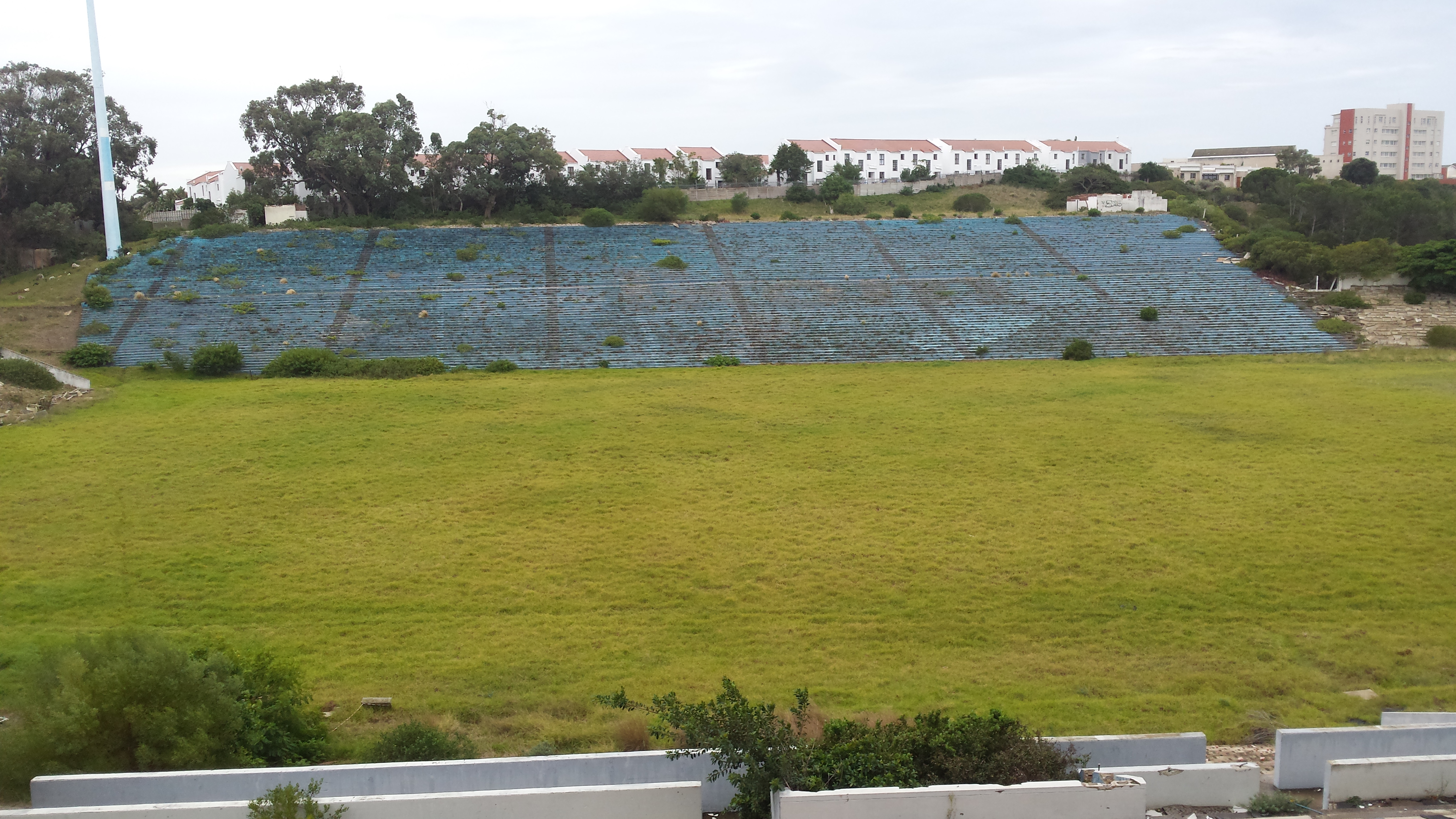
Remnants of the EPRU Stadium in 2016

The stadium was officially closed in July 2010. The Eastern Province Rugby Union has relocated all games to the new world-class Nelson Mandela Bay Stadium in Port Elizabeth. The last match to be played at the stadium was a friendly against the Blue Bulls on 3 July 2010. The Boet hosted age-group, amateur and club rugby matches after being officially closed but has since been abandoned, with vagrants and thieves having slowly dismantled the stadium to such an extent that all that remains are the concrete structures. The local municipality, who own the property, has asked for proposals from the private sector for the redevelopment of the land.

The stadium was demolished on 19 November 2018.

== International tournaments ==
=== 1995 Rugby World Cup ===
The stadium was one of 9 venues throughout South Africa used for the Rugby World Cup. The stadium was used for group games in Group A. It hosted 3 games, including the match between South Africa and Canada:

Date	Team #1	Res.	Team #2	Round	Attendance
26 May 1995	Canada	34-3	Romania	Group A	18,000
31 May 1995	Australia	27-11	Canada	Group A	15,000
3 June 1995	South Africa	20-0	Canada	Group A	31,000

=== 1996 African Cup of Nations ===
When the tournament was moved to South Africa, the EPRU Stadium was chosen as one of 4 host stadiums. A total of 6 pool games were played at the stadium, as well as a quarter-final:

Date	Team #1	Result	Team #2	Round	Attendance
14 January 1996	Ghana	2–0	Ivory Coast	Group D	8,000
16 January 1996	Tunisia	1–1	Mozambique	Group D	1,000
19 January 1996	Ghana	2–1	Tunisia	Group D	1,000
21 January 1996	Ivory Coast	1–0	Mozambique	Group D	500
24 January 1996	Algeria	2–1	Burkina Faso	Group B	180
25 January 1996	Tunisia	3–1	Ivory Coast	Group D	1,000
28 January 1996	Ghana	1–0	Zaire	Quarterfinals	8,000

=== 2010 FIFA World Cup ===
During the 2010 FIFA World Cup, the stadium was used as a logistics point for Port Elizabeth, a host city.

== International matches ==
=== Rugby Union ===
Date	Team #1	Result	Team #2	Round	Attendance
30 April 1960	South Africa	18-10	Scotland	Test match	24,000
27 August 1960	South Africa	8-3	New Zealand	Test match	53,000
12 August 1961	South Africa	23-11	Australia	Test match	26,000
30 June 1962	Eastern Province	6-21	British Lions	Tour match	
7 September 1963	South Africa	22-6	Australia	Test match	48,600
29 May 1968	Eastern Province	14-23	British Lions	Tour match	
22 June 1968	South Africa	6-6	British Lions	Test match	70,000
29 August 1970	South Africa	14-3	New Zealand	Test match	55,000
25 May 1974	South Africa	9-26	British Lions	Test match	55,000
13 June 1974	Eastern Province	14-28	British Lions	Tour match	
10 May 1980	Eastern Province	16-28	British Lions	Tour match	
28 June 1980	South Africa	12-10	British Lions	Test match	45,000
2 June 1984	South Africa	33-15	England	Test match	46,000
8 October 1994	South Africa	42-22	Argentina	Test match	28,000
3 June 1995	South Africa	20-0	Canada	Test match	31,000
24 May 1997	Eastern Province XV	11-39	British Lions	Tour match	
12 June 1999	South Africa	74-3	Italy	Test match	35,000
30 June 2001	South Africa	60-14	Italy	Test match	35,000
28 June 2003	South Africa	26-25	Argentina	Test match	25,000
25 June 2005	South Africa	27-13	France	Test match	35,000
17 June 2006	South Africa	29-15	Scotland	Test match	25,844

=== South Africa National Football Team ===
Date	Team #1	Res.	Team #2	Round	Attendance
29 July 2000	South Africa	0–1	Zimbabwe	2000 COSAFA Cup#Semi-Final	35,000
14 June 2003	South Africa	2–1	Trinidad and Tobago	International Friendly	28,000
12 November 2005	South Africa	2–3	Senegal	Nelson Mandela Challenge	
1 June 2008	South Africa	0–1	Nigeria	2010 FIFA World Cup qualifier	30,000

== See also ==
- Nelson Mandela Bay Stadium
- List of stadiums in South Africa
- List of African stadiums by capacity
