= Willie John McBride =

Irish rugby union player

Willie John McBride CBE
- Born: William James McBride; 6 June 1940 (age 86) Moneyglass, County Antrim, Northern Ireland
- Height: 1.92 m (6 ft 4 in)
- Weight: 110 kg (17 st 5 lb; 243 lb)

Rugby union career
- Position: Lock
Amateur team(s)
Years	Team	Apps	(Points)
1958-1980	Ballymena R.F.C		
International career
Years	Team	Apps	(Points)
1962–1975	Ireland	63	(4)
1962, 1966, 1968, 1971, 1974	Lions	17	(3)

William James McBride, better known as Willie John McBride (born 6 June 1940), is a former rugby union footballer from Northern Ireland who played as a lock for Ireland and the British and Irish Lions. He made 63 appearances for Ireland, including eleven as captain, and toured with the Lions five times; a record that earned him 17 Lions Test caps and 71 appearances in the red jersey. He also captained one of the most successful Lions sides, which returned undefeated from South Africa in 1974. McBride, inducted into the World Rugby Hall of Fame in 2009, is regarded as one of the most influential figures ever to play the game.

McBride is opposed to the use of a 23-man bench, "absolute nonsense" he considers unfair and increasing the risk of injury.

== Youth ==
McBride was born in Moneyglass near Toomebridge, County Antrim, one of four boys; one died at a young age in a drowning accident. Owing to his father's death when he was four years old, he spent most of his spare time helping out on his family farm. Because of his commitments on the farm, he did not start playing rugby until he was 17. He was educated at Ballymena Academy and played for the school's First XV and the Ulster Schools' team. After he left he joined Ballymena and was playing for the first team within a year. McBride was primarily into athletics at school, winning the Ulster School pole-vault championship in 1956 and 1957. He attributed the strength gained on the farm for never having to come off injured in a playing career that covered four decades, even playing 20 minutes with a broken leg at one stage.

== Playing career ==
In 1962 McBride was selected to play for Ireland. His first Test on 10 February 1962 was against England at Twickenham. Later that year he was selected to tour South Africa with the British and Irish Lions.

McBride continued to play for Ireland throughout the 1960s and played for Ireland when they first defeated South Africa (the Springboks) in 1965, and when Ireland defeated Australia in Sydney — the first time a Home Nations team had defeated a major southern hemisphere team in their own country. He was again selected for the Lions in 1966, this time touring New Zealand and Australia. He toured South Africa with the Lions again in 1968.

He was selected to play for the Lions in their 1971 tour of New Zealand. McBride was made pack leader and helped the Lions to a Test series win over New Zealand; their first and last series win over New Zealand. He received an MBE in 1971 for services to rugby football.

== 1974 Lions tour to South Africa ==
McBride's leadership qualities led to his appointment as captain of the British and Irish Lions in their 1974 tour to South Africa. The Test series was won 3–0, with one match drawn; the first Lions series ever won in South Africa. It was one of the most controversial and physical Test match series ever played. The management of the Lions concluded that the Springboks dominated their opponents with physical aggression and so they decided to match fire with fire. Willie John McBride instigated a policy of "one in, all in": that is, when one Lion retaliated, all other Lions were expected to join in the melee or hit the nearest Springbok.

At that time there were only substitutions if a doctor agreed that a player was physically unable to continue and there were no video cameras and sideline officials to keep the punching, kicking and head butting to a minimum. If the South Africans were to resort to foul play then the Lions decided "to get their retaliation in first." The signal for this was to call "99" (a shortened version of the emergency number in Ireland and in the United Kingdom: 999). This was a signal for the Lions to clobber their nearest rival players.

== Retirement ==
In 1975 as his international career was ending he played his last game for Ireland at Lansdowne Road. The game was against France, and near the end of the match he scored his first test try. It was the crowning moment of a great playing career. His last international game was against Wales on Saturday 15 March 1975. McBride played 63 times for Ireland, won 17 Lions Test caps and wore the Lions jersey 71 times.

After retiring from playing, McBride coached the Irish team and was manager of the unsuccessful 1983 Lions tour to New Zealand, when all four Tests were lost. In 1997 he was an inaugural inductee into the International Rugby Hall of Fame. He lives in Ballyclare. He has been asked to present Test jerseys and give motivational speeches to Lions players prior to matches. In 2004 he was named in Rugby World magazine as "Rugby Personality of the Century". He is a major supporter of the Wooden Spoon Society.

McBride was awarded a CBE in the 2019 New Year Honours list for services to Rugby Union.

== Bibliography ==
- McBride, Willie John; Bills, Peter (2005). Willie John: The Story of My Life. Piatkus Books. ISBN 0-7499-5024-2.
- Encyclopdea of World Rugby published 1995.

Preceded by Tom Kiernan	Irish national rugby coach 1983–84	Succeeded by Mick Doyle
