= 1992 Australia rugby union tour of South Africa =

Summary
P	W	D	L
Total
4	4	0	0
Test match
1	1	0	0
Opponent
P	W	D	L
South Africa
1	1	0	0

The 1992 Australia rugby union tour of South Africa was a series of matches played by Australia in South Africa during August 1992. It was the first tour by the Wallabies to South Africa for 23 years.

Australia won all four matches, including the only test match.

== Results ==
Scores and results list Australia's points tally first.

No.	Date	Opponent	Venue	For	Against	Status
1	11 August 1992	Western Transvaal	Olën Park, Potchefstroom	46	13	Tour match
2	14 August 1992	Northern Transvaal	Loftus Versfeld Stadium, Pretoria	24	17	Tour match
3	18 August 1992	Eastern Province	Boet Erasmus Stadium, Port Elizabeth	34	8	Tour match
4	22 August 1992	South Africa	Newlands, Cape Town	26	3	Test match

== Touring party ==
- Manager: John Breen
- Coach: Bob Dwyer
- Assistant coach: Bob Templeton

Backs
Name	Position	State
Marty Roebuck	Fullback	New South Wales
Tim Kelaher	Fullback	New South Wales
David Campese	Wing	New South Wales
Paul Carozza	Wing	Queensland
Darren Junee	Wing	New South Wales
Tim Horan	Centre	Queensland
Jason Little	Centre	Queensland
Richard Tombs	Centre	New South Wales
Anthony Herbert	Centre	Queensland
Michael Lynagh	Fly-half	Queensland
Paul Kahl	Fly-half	Queensland
Nick Farr-Jones (c)	Scrum-half	New South Wales
Peter Slattery	Scrum-half	Queensland

Forwards
Name	Position	State
Tony Daly	Prop	New South Wales
Ewen McKenzie	Prop	New South Wales
Andrew Blades	Prop	New South Wales
Matthew Ryan	Prop	Queensland
Phil Kearns	Hooker	New South Wales
Tom Lawton	Hooker	Queensland
Rod McCall	Lock	Queensland
John Eales	Lock	Queensland
Garrick Morgan	Lock	Queensland
Warwick Waugh	Lock	New South Wales
Viliami Ofahengaue	Loose forward	New South Wales
Troy Coker	Flanker	Queensland
David Wilson	Flanker	Queensland
Sam Scott-Young	Flanker	Queensland
Tim Gavin	Flanker	New South Wales

== Tour matches ==
11 August 1992

Western Transvaal	13–46	Australia
Try: Eugene Hare, Terrence Stewart; Pen: Graeme Bouwer		Try: Tim Gavin (2), David Wilson, Garrick Morgan, Warwick Waugh, Andrew Blades; Con: Marty Roebuck (2); Pen: Marty Roebuck (4)

Olën Park, Potchefstroom
Attendance: 16,000
Referee: Freek Burger

14 August 1992

Northern Transvaal	17–24	Australia
Try: Hannes Strydom; Pen: Luke Smith (3), Gerbrand Grobler		Try: David Campese (2); Con: Tim Kelaher; Pen: Michael Lynagh (2), Tim Kelaher (2)

Loftus Versfeld Stadium, Pretoria
Attendance: 35,000
Referee: Ian Rogers

18 August 1992

Eastern Province	8–34	Australia
Try: Greg Miller; Pen: Greg Miller		Try: Darren Junee, Anthony Herbert, Paul Kahl, Peter Slattery; Con: Tim Kelaher (2); Pen: Tim Kelaher (4)

Boet Erasmus Stadium, Port Elizabeth
Attendance: 20,000
Referee: Ian Anderson

== Test match ==
22 August 1992

South Africa	3–26	Australia
Pen: Botha		Try: Campese, Carozza (2); Con: Lynagh; Pen: Lynagh (3)

Newlands, Cape Town
Attendance: 43,000
Referee: Dave Bishop (New Zealand)

FB	15	Theo Jansen van Rensburg
RW	14	James Small
OC	13	Danie Gerber
IC	12	Pieter Muller
LW	11	Pieter Hendriks
FH	10	Naas Botha (c)
SH	9	Robert du Preez
N8	8	Jannie Breedt
BF	7	Ian MacDonald
OF	6	Wahl Bartmann
RL	5	Adolf Malan
LL	4	Adri Geldenhuys	(substituted off) 28'
TP	3	Lood Muller
HK	2	Uli Schmidt
LP	1	Johan Styger
Replacements:
CE	16	Heinrich Füls
FH	17	Hennie le Roux
SH	18	Garth Wright
LK	19	Drikus Hattingh	(substituted on) 28'
PR	20	Willie Hills
HK	21	Harry Roberts
Coach:
John Williams

FB	15	Marty Roebuck
RW	14	David Campese
OC	13	Jason Little
IC	12	Tim Horan
LW	11	Paul Carozza
FH	10	Michael Lynagh
SH	9	Nick Farr-Jones (c)
N8	8	Tim Gavin
OF	7	David Wilson
BF	6	Viliami Ofahengaue
RL	5	John Eales
LL	4	Rod McCall
TP	3	Ewen McKenzie
HK	2	Phil Kearns
LP	1	Tony Daly
Replacements:
CE	16	Anthony Herbert
FH	17	Paul Kahl
SH	18	Peter Slattery
LK	19	Garrick Morgan
PR	20	Andrew Blades
HK	21	Tom Lawton
Coach:
Bob Dwyer

== See also ==
- History of rugby union matches between Australia and South Africa
