= 1992 South Africa rugby union tour of France and England =

- Coach(es): John Williams
- Tour captain(s): Naas Botha
- Top point scorer(s): Naas Botha (74)
- Top try scorer(s): Danie Gerber (4) Jacques Olivier (4)
- Top test point scorer(s): Naas Botha (32)
- Top test try scorer(s): Danie Gerber (2)
Summary
P	W	D	L
Total
13	8	0	5
Test match
3	1	0	2
Opponent
P	W	D	L
France
2	1	0	1
England
1	0	0	1

The 1992 South Africa rugby union tour of France and England was a series of matches played in October and November 1992 in France and England by the South Africa national rugby union team. The 1992 tour was South Africa's first tour to France since 1974 and to England since 1969–70.

== Touring party ==
- Coach: John Williams
- Assistant coach: Ian Kirkpatrick
- Manager: Abie Malan
- Assistant manager: Jackie Abrahams

Name	Position	Province	Notes
Theo Jansen van Rensburg	Fullback	Transvaal	
Hugh Reece-Edwards	Fullback	Natal	
Pieter Hendriks	Wing	Transvaal	
Deon Oosthuysen	Wing	Northern Transvaal	
Jacques Olivier	Wing	Northern Transvaal	
James Small	Wing	Transvaal	
Faffa Knoetze	Centre	Western Province	
Danie Gerber	Centre	Western Province	
Heinrich Füls	Centre	Transvaal	
Pieter Muller	Centre	Natal	
Naas Botha (c)	Fly-half	Northern Transvaal	
Hennie le Roux	Fly-half	Transvaal	
Garth Wright	Scrum-half	Transvaal	
Robert du Preez	Scrum-half	Natal	
Heinrich Rodgers	Prop	Northern Transvaal	
Johan Styger	Prop	Free State	
Keith Andrews	Prop	Western Province	
Willie Hills	Prop/Hooker	Northern Transvaal	
Andries Truscott	Hooker	Northern Transvaal	
Harry Roberts	Hooker	Transvaal	
Adri Geldenhuys	Lock	Eastern Province	
Drikus Hattingh	Lock	Northern Transvaal	
Adolf Malan	Lock	Northern Transvaal	
Steve Atherton	Lock	Natal	
Wahl Bartmann	Flanker	Natal	
Piet Pretorius	Flanker	Northern Transvaal	
Ian Macdonald	Flanker	Transvaal	
Botha Rossouw	Flanker	Western Transvaal	
Tiaan Strauss	No. 8	Western Province	
Adriaan Richter	No. 8	Northern Transvaal	
Phillip Schutte	Lock	Northern Transvaal	Later addition to the tour
FC Smit	Flanker	Western Province	Later addition to the tour

== Results ==
Scores and results list South Africa's points tally first.

No.	Date	Opponent	Venue	Result	Score	Status
1	3 October 1992	French Emerging XV	Stade Chaban-Delmas, Bordeaux	Lost	17–24	Tour match
2	7 October 1992	French Regional XV	Stade du Hameau, Pau	Won	29–22	Tour match
3	10 October 1992	French Midi-Pyrenean Regional	Stadium Municipal, Toulouse	Won	18–15	Tour match
4	13 October 1992	Provence-Côte d'Azur XV	Stade Vélodrome, Marseille	Won	41–12	Tour match
5	17 October 1992	France	Stade de Gerland, Lyon	Won	20–15	Test match
6	20 October 1992	Languedoc Regional	Stade de la Méditerranée, Beziers	Won	36–15	Tour match
7	24 October 1992	France	Parc des Princes, Paris	Lost	16–29	Test match
8	28 October 1992	French Universities	Tours	Lost	13–18	Tour match
9	31 October 1992	French Barbarians	Stadium Nord Lille Metropole, Lille	Lost	20–25	Tour match
10	4 November 1992	England Midlands	Welford Road Stadium, Leicester	Won	32–9	Tour match
11	7 November 1992	England B	Memorial Ground, Bristol	Won	20–16	Tour match
12	10 November 1992	North of England	Elland Road, Leeds	Won	19–3	Tour match
13	14 November 1992	England	Twickenham Stadium, London	Lost	16–33	Test match

== Test matches ==
=== First test: France ===
17 October 1992

France	15–20	South Africa
Try: Penaud (2); Con: Viars; Pen: Viars		Try: Gerber; Small; Con: Botha (2); Pen: Botha; Drop: Botha

Stade de Gerland, Lyon
Attendance: 27,096
Referee: Brian Kinsey (Australia)

France			South Africa
Jean-Luc Sadourny	FB	15	FB	Hugh Reece-Edwards
Philippe Saint-André	W	14	W	James Small
Franck Mesnel	C	13	C	Danie Gerber
Christophe Deylaud	C	12	C	Pieter Muller
Sebastien Viars	W	11	W	Jacques Olivier
Alain Penaud	FH	10	FH	Naas Botha (capt.)
Aubin Hueber	SH	9	SH	Garth Wright
(capt.) Marc Cécillon	N8	8	N8	Tiaan Strauss
Laurent Cabannes	F	7	F	Adriaan Richter
(substituted off) Jean-Francois Tordo	F	6	F	Wahl Bartmann
Olivier Roumat	L	5	L	Adolf Malan
(substituted off) Jean-Marie Cadieu	L	4	L	Adri Geldenhuys
Philippe Gallart	P	3	P	Heinrich Rodgers
Jean-Michel Gonzalez	H	2	H	Willie Hills
Louis Armary	P	1	P	Johan Styger
		Replacements
(substituted in) Abdelatif Benazzi				Deon Oosthuysen
(substituted in) Philippe Benetton				Theo Jansen van Rensburg
				Robert du Preez
				Harry Roberts
				Botha Rossouw
				Drikus Hattingh
		Coaches
Pierre Berbizier (France)				(South Africa) John Williams

=== Second test: France ===
24 October 1992

France	29–16	South Africa
Try: Penaud; Roumat; Con: Lacroix (2); Pen: Lacroix (5)		Try: Gerber; Con: Botha; Pen: Botha (2); Drop: Botha

Parc des Princes, Paris
Attendance: 38,130
Referee: Brian Kinsey (Australia)

France			South Africa
Jean-Luc Sadourny	FB	15	FB	Hugh Reece-Edwards
Philippe Saint-André	W	14	W	James Small
Franck Mesnel	C	13	C	Danie Gerber
Thierry Lacroix	C	12	C	Pieter Muller
(substituted off) Jean-Baptiste Lafond	W	11	W	Jacques Olivier
Alain Penaud	FH	10	FH	Naas Botha (capt.)
Aubin Hueber	SH	9	SH	Garth Wright
(capt.) Marc Cécillon	N8	8	N8	Tiaan Strauss
Laurent Cabannes	F	7	F	Adriaan Richter
Philippe Benetton	F	6	F	Wahl Bartmann
Olivier Roumat	L	5	L	Adolf Malan
Abdelatif Benazzi	L	4	L	Adri Geldenhuys (substituted off)
Philippe Gallart	P	3	P	Heinrich Rodgers
Jean-Michel Gonzalez	H	2	H	Willie Hills
Louis Armary	P	1	P	Johan Styger
		Replacements
(substituted in) Sebastien Viars				Theo Jansen van Rensburg
				Hennie le Roux
				Robert du Preez
				Harry Roberts
				Drikus Hattingh (substituted in)
				Ian Macdonald
		Coaches
Pierre Berbizier (France)				(South Africa) John Williams

=== England ===
14 November 1992

England	33–16	South Africa
Try: T. Underwood; Carling, Guscott, Morris; Con: Webb (2); Pen: Webb (3)		Try: Strauss; Con: Botha; Pen: Botha (2); Drop: Botha

Twickenham Stadium, London
Attendance: 54,000
Referee: Stephen Hilditch (Ireland)

England			South Africa
Jonathan Webb	FB	15	FB	Theo Jansen van Rensburg
(substituted off) Tony Underwood	W	14	W	James Small
(capt.) Will Carling	C	13	C	Danie Gerber
Jeremy Guscott	C	12	C	Pieter Muller
Rory Underwood	W	11	W	Jacques Olivier
Rob Andrew	FH	10	FH	Naas Botha (capt.)
Dewi Morris	SH	9	SH	Garth Wright
Ben Clarke	N8	8	N8	Adriaan Richter
Peter Winterbottom	F	7	F	FC Smit
Mike Teague	F	6	F	Tiaan Strauss
Wade Dooley	L	5	L	Adolf Malan
Martin Bayfield	L	4	L	Drikus Hattingh
Victor Ubogu	P	3	P	Keith Andrews
Brian Moore	H	2	H	Willie Hills
Jason Leonard	P	1	P	Johan Styger
		Replacements
(substituted in) Phil de Glanville				Robert du Preez
Stuart Barnes				Faffa Knoetze
Steve Bates				Heinrich Füls
Jeff Probyn				Harry Roberts
John Olver				Phillip Schutte
Tim Rodber				Piet Pretorius
		Coaches
Geoff Cooke (England)				(South Africa) John Williams

== See also ==
- History of rugby union matches between France and South Africa
- History of rugby union matches between England and South Africa
