= 1992 South Africa vs New Zealand rugby union match =

South Africa's first rugby test match since the end of apartheid

1992 South Africa vs New Zealand rugby match
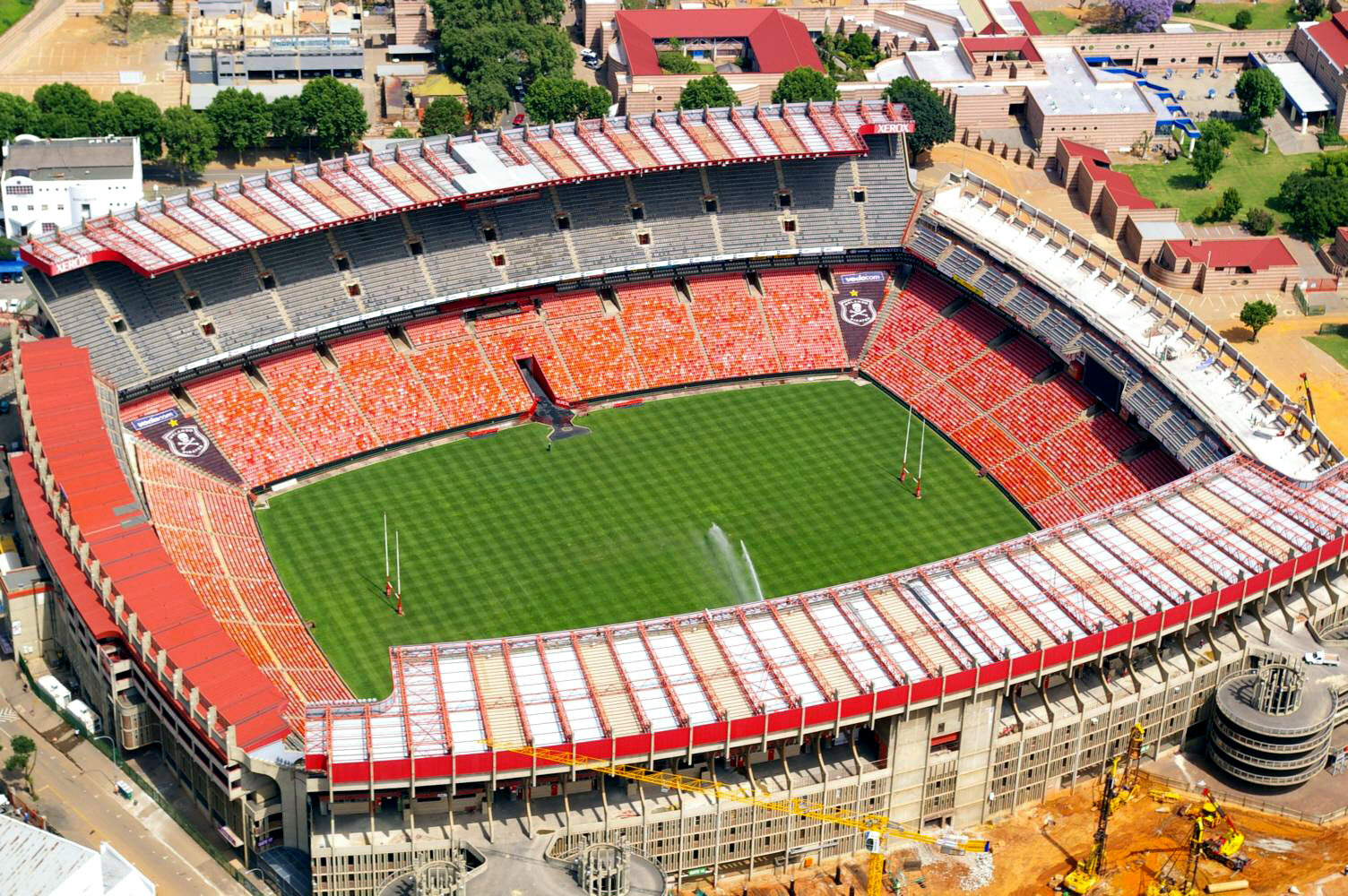
- Event: 1992 New Zealand rugby union tour of Australia and South Africa
South Africa	New Zealand
(South Africa)	(New Zealand)
24	27
- Date: 15 August 1992
- Venue: Ellis Park Stadium, Johannesburg, South Africa
- Attendance: 72,000

In 1992, the South Africa national team, the Springboks, played a rugby union test match against New Zealand, the All Blacks. The match was played at Ellis Park Stadium in Johannesburg on 15 August 1992. It became known as the Return Test as it was South Africa's first test match since the International Rugby Football Board (IRFB) had banned them due to apartheid.

== History ==
Between 1984 and 1992, South Africa were isolated from playing test rugby due to the country's apartheid policies, highlighted by campaigns like Halt All Racist Tours. They had played a number of unofficial tests against rebel teams such as the New Zealand Cavaliers but these were condemned by rugby's organising bodies and players that took part in them often received bans from national selection.

In 1990, President F. W. de Klerk started negotiations to end apartheid in South Africa with Nelson Mandela's African National Congress (ANC). During negotiation, the white South African Rugby Board and the non-racial South African Rugby Union merged to create the South African Rugby Football Union. Rugby at the time was seen by many black South Africans as a symbol of white supremacy. The ANC demanded that the new SARFU improve development of black players. This was because the Springboks team consisted solely of white players at the time, though black players were eligible for selection for the Springboks following the merger of the two governing bodies. Following the yes vote in the South African apartheid referendum in March 1992, the IRFB lifted restrictions on tours of South Africa. It was announced that the return test would be against New Zealand. This was criticised in South Africa as the Springboks had not played full international rugby for 11 years and it was felt it would not be competitive however New Zealand were invited because it was felt appropriate after the events around the 1981 South Africa rugby union tour.

== Pre-match ==
The ANC had agreed to support the match under three conditions: that the South African national flag not be flown officially, that the national anthem "Die Stem van Suid-Afrika" not be played and that there would be a minute's silence to remember victims of the township violence in South Africa. The SARFU agreed to these requests, but a request for visiting teams to visit Boipatong - where the Boipatong massacre had recently taken place - was not agreed to.

Before the match, however, the Conservative Party passed out leaflets endorsing singing of "Die Stem van Suid-Afrika" as a protest against black nationalism. It was noticed that a large number of the predominantly white Afrikaner crowd waved South African flags that the Conservative Party had also given out. The minute's silence was also disrupted by the crowd jeering "Fok die ANC" (Afrikaans: Fuck the ANC) and singing "Die Stem van Suid-Afrika". After the performance of "God Defend New Zealand"; SARFU President Louis Luyt broke the agreement with the ANC and played an instrumental version of "Die Stem van Suid-Afrika" over the PA system with the crowd and several South African players joining in. This was followed by the traditional haka of the All Blacks.

== The match ==
=== First half ===
The first points of the match were scored by New Zealand's Grant Fox from a penalty kick, during which the South African supporters counted Fox's steps in a divergence from rugby etiquette where normally silence is kept during kicks. South Africa also had a penalty kick at goal, but this was missed by Naas Botha. The first try of the match came from New Zealand's Zinzan Brooke following a quick tap penalty which was converted by Fox. South Africa then pressured the All Blacks but failed to score, with the score at the end of first half 10–0 to New Zealand.

=== Second half ===
The second half started with Botha kicking a penalty to make the score 10–3. However Botha missed two further penalty kicks which proved crucial in the result of the match. Following a clearance kick from Robert du Preez, John Kirwan scored a try for New Zealand with Fox converting, making the score 17–3, before Fox scored another penalty to make it 20–3. Later in the match Danie Gerber scored a try for the Springboks which Botha converted. Following some poor tackling, John Timu scored for the All Blacks, with the try again being converted by Fox. In the last 5 minutes of the match, South Africa scored two tries from Pieter Muller and Gerber with both being converted by Botha with the last kick of the game to make the final score 27–24.

=== Details ===
15 August 1992
13:30 UTC+2

South Africa	24–27	New Zealand
Try: Gerber (2), P. Muller; Con: Botha (3); Pen: Botha	Report	Try: Z. Brooke, Kirwan, Timu; Con: Fox (3); Pen: Fox (2)

Ellis Park, Johannesburg
Attendance: 72,000

South Africa	New Zealand

FB	15	Theo Jansen van Rensburg
RW	14	James Small
OC	13	Danie Gerber
IC	12	Pieter Muller
LW	11	Pieter Hendriks
FH	10	Naas Botha (c)
SH	9	Robert du Preez
N8	8	Jannie Breedt
BF	7	Ian MacDonald
OF	6	Wahl Bartmann
RL	5	Adolf Malan
LL	4	Adri Geldenhuys
TP	3	Lood Muller
HK	2	Uli Schmidt
LP	1	Heinrich Rodgers
Replacements:
PR	16	Johan Styger
WG	17	Heinrich Füls
FL	18	Garth Wright
CE	19	Hennie le Roux
SR	20	Drikus Hattingh
FB	21	Harry Roberts
Coach:
John Williams

FB	15	John Timu
RW	14	John Kirwan
OC	13	Frank Bunce
IC	12	Walter Little
LW	11	Inga Tuigamala
FH	10	Grant Fox
SH	9	Ant Strachan
N8	8	Zinzan Brooke
OF	7	Michael Jones
BF	6	Jamie Joseph
RL	5	Robin Brooke
LL	4	Ian Jones
TP	3	Richard Loe
HK	2	Sean Fitzpatrick (c)
LP	1	Olo Brown
Replacements:
SH	16	Jon Preston
WG	17	Matthew Cooper
Coach:
Laurie Mains

== Post-match ==
Though the match was intended to be a celebration of unity, the pre-match actions caused a political row. The fact that "Die Stem van Suid-Afrika" was played before the match and the reaction of the predominantly white crowd were perceived to be an act of white defiance. Luyt defended his decision to play the South African anthem, stating "I will not be threatened by anybody, and I don't care if certain people, not having rugby at heart, feel upset about my decision." In its match report the following day, The Star wrote, "For that moment inside the concrete bowl, it seemed like a besieged tribe had gathered to take strength in their numbers and to send, from the protected citadel, a message of defiance to their perceived persecutors."

The ANC threatened to withdraw support for South Africa's next test match against Australia, which could have led to the cancellation the match due to safety concerns and Australia stated they would not play if the match didn't have ANC support. However, the future South African sports minister Steve Tshwete asked for the ANC to give the supporters another chance and the ANC did not withdraw their support. Instead they issued a warning that if it happened again they would oppose all future tours and the 1995 Rugby World Cup.

The return test was seen as the first step towards the 1995 Rugby World Cup, which South Africa hosted and won by defeating New Zealand 15–12 in the final. Before that match, both national anthems of South Africa – "Nkosi Sikelel' iAfrika" and "Die Stem van Suid-Afrika" – were played and sung by both players and fans. The 1992 test was seen as the first step towards the notion of South Africa as a "rainbow nation" after apartheid as rugby started to gain support from all races.

== Bibliography ==
- Black, David Ross (1998). Rugby and the South African Nation. Manchester University Press. ISBN 0-7190-4932-6.
