= FC Smit =

South African rugby union footballer

- Born: Frederick Christiaan Smit; 13 August 1966 (age 60) Potgietersrus (now Mokopane), Limpopo, South Africa
- Height: 2.00 m (6 ft 7 in)
- Weight: 115 kg (254 lb)
- School: Hoërskool Jan van Riebeeck
- University: Stellenbosch University

Rugby union career
- Position(s): Lock, Flank
Amateur team(s)
Years	Team	Apps	(Points)
- Maties
Provincial / State sides
Years	Team	Apps	(Points)
1990–1996	Western Province	104	
International career
Years	Team	Apps	(Points)
1992	South Africa	1	

Frederick Christiaan 'FC' Smit (born 13 Augustus 1966 in Potgietersrus, South Africa) is a former South African rugby union player.

== Early life and career ==
Smit finished his schooling in Cape Town, after which he started his National service, also in Cape Town. While in the Defence Force he was selected for the Western Province under–20 side. In 1987 he enrolled at the Stellenbosch University, initially playing for the second team and from 1988 for the first team. During the off-seasons Smit joined clubs in Europe, specifically in France at Hendaye Rugby Club and Wales at Ebbw Vale RFC.

== Playing career ==
Smit made his debut for Western Province on 22 May 1990 against Northern Transvaal when he replaced the injured Gert Smal. His career with Western Province spanned seven years and 104 matches.

In 1992 the Springboks toured to France and England under the captaincy of Naas Botha. Smit was not part of the original touring squad, but received his call up as a replacement for the injured Botha Rossouw. He made his test debut for the Springboks on 14 November 1992 against England at Twickenham. He played in one test match, as well as three tour matches for the Springboks.

=== Test history ===
No.	Opposition	Result (SA 1st)	Position	Tries	Date	Venue
1.	England	16–33	Flank		14 November 1992	Twickenham, London

== See also ==
- List of South Africa national rugby union players – Springbok no. 583
