= Helgard Müller =

South African rugby union footballer

- Born: Helgard Lourens Müller; June 1, 1963 (age 63) Bloemfontein, South Africa
- Height: 1.82 m (6 ft 0 in)
- Weight: 78 kg (12 st 4 lb)
- School: Grey College, Bloemfontein
- Notable relative: Pieter Muller (brother)

Rugby union career
- Position(s): Centre, Wing
Amateur team(s)
Years	Team	Apps	(Points)
- Shimlas
Provincial / State sides
Years	Team	Apps	(Points)
1983–1999	Free State	142	
Super Rugby
Years	Team	Apps	(Points)
1997	Free State	11	(5)
International career
Years	Team	Apps	(Points)
1986–1989	South Africa	2	(0)
- Cricket career

Cricket information
- Batting: Right-handed
- Bowling: Right arm off break

Domestic team information
- Years: Team
- 1982/83–1983/84: Free State

Career statistics
Competition	FC
Matches	6
Runs scored	53
Batting average	8.83
100s/50s	0/0
Top score	23
Balls bowled	510
Wickets	6
Bowling average	55.66
5 wickets in innings	0
10 wickets in match	0
Best bowling	2/22
Catches/stumpings	3/–
- Source: Cricinfo

Helgard Lourens Müller (1 June 1963, Bloemfontein) is a South African former rugby union footballer. He was capped twice by the Springboks and played centre and wing for Free State.

== Playing career ==
In 1981, Müller was chosen for the South African School Team. Müller appeared as a replacement for the Springboks against the New Zealand Cavaliers in 1986, and against the World Invitation Team in 1989. He also played three tour matches, and therefore appeared five times in the green-and-gold. When the Free State played in the 1997 Super 12, Müller was captain. Müller's Springbok appearances were limited by the strong competition at centre at the time, including Danie Gerber, Michael du Plessis and Faffa Knoetze.

Müller appeared 142 times for the Free State in Currie Cup rugby, and 245 times in total, including at junior level, tour matches, the Vodacom Cup and Super Rugby.

=== Test history ===
No.	Opposition	Result (SA 1st)	Position	Tries	Date	Venue
1.	New Zealand Cavaliers	24–10	Replacement		31 May 1986	Ellis Park, Johannesburg
2.	World XV	20–19	Replacement		26 Aug 1989	Newlands, Cape Town

== Accolades ==
In 1984, Müller was nominated as Young Player of the Year, together with Paul Botes, Niel Burger, Wessel Lightfoot and Uli Schmidt.

== Trivia ==
Outside rugby, Müller also represented Free State in cricket. He played six matches for them, with a batting average of 8.83 and a bowling average of 55.66

== See also ==
- List of South Africa national rugby union players – Springbok no. 551
