= Styger =

Styger is a surname. Notable people with the surname include:

- Johan Styger (born 1962), South African rugby union player
- Nadia Styger (born 1978), Swiss alpine ski racer

== Fictional characters ==
- Nils Styger (Abyss), Marvel Comics character
