= Niel Hugo =

South African rugby union footballer

- Born: Daniël Pieter Hugo; 11 November 1958 (age 68) Victoria West, Northern Cape
- Height: 2.04 m (6 ft 8 in)
- Weight: 115 kg (254 lb)
- School: Hoërskool Victoria-Wes, Victoria West, Northern Cape
- University: Stellenbosch University
- Notable relative: Reniel Hugo (son)

Rugby union career
- Position: Lock
Amateur team(s)
Years	Team	Apps	(Points)
- Maties
–	Malmesbury RFC		
–	Gardens–Tech RFC		
–	Bellville RFC		
Provincial / State sides
Years	Team	Apps	(Points)
1984, 1986–1993	Western Province	146	
1985	Boland	13	(4)
International career
Years	Team	Apps	(Points)
1989	South Africa	2	(0)

Daniël Pieter Hugo (born 31 March 1964) is a South African former rugby union player that played two tests for the Springboks.

== Playing career ==
Hugo grew up in Victoria West in the Northern Cape and studied at Stellenbosch University. He made his senior provincial debut for Western Province in 1984 against Northern Transvaal at Loftus Versfeld and also scored a try in the match. Hugo played 146 matches for Western Province, 120 of which were consecutive and was he part of the Western Province team that won the Currie Cup in 1986 and shared it with Northern Transvaal in 1989.

Hugo made his test debut for the Springboks against the World XV on 26 August 1989 at his home ground, Newlands in Cape Town. He also played in the second test against the World XV.

=== Test history ===
No.	Opponents	Results(RSA 1st)	Position	Tries	Dates	Venue
1.	World XV	20–19	Lock		26 Aug 1989	Newlands, Cape Town
2.	World XV	22–16	Lock		2 Sep 1989	Ellis Park, Johannesburg

== Trivia ==
Hugo and his lock partner against the World XV, Adolf Malan had the honour of being the tallest Springbok players at 2.04m. In 2008 Andries Bekker became the tallest Springbok with a length of 2.08m.

He is the father of well-traveled professional rugby player Reniel Hugo, now playing for Toyota Verblitz in Japan after representing three South African provinces.

== See also ==
- List of South Africa national rugby union players – Springbok no. 555
