= Schalk Burger (disambiguation) =

Schalk Burger may refer to:

- Schalk Willem Burger (1852–1918), acting President of the South African Republic from 1900 to 1902
- Schalk Burger (born 1983), South African rugby union flanker
- Schalk Burger (rugby union, born 1955), South African rugby union player
- Schalk Burger Geldenhuys, South African rugby union player
