= Piet Pretorius =

Piet Pretorius may refer to:

- Piet Pretorius (politician) (fl. 2012)
- Piet Pretorius (rugby union) (born 1964)
