= Keith Andrews (rugby union) =

South African rugby union footballer

- Born: Keith Steven Andrews; 3 May 1962 (age 64) Molteno, Eastern Cape
- Height: 1.80 m (5 ft 11 in)
- Weight: 102 kg (225 lb)
- School: Selborne College, East London
- University: University of Cape Town
- Notable relative: Mark Andrews (cousin)

Rugby union career
Amateur team(s)
Years	Team	Apps	(Points)
- UCT
- Villagers
- Stade Aurillacois
- Cape Town Defence
- Hamiltons
Provincial / State sides
Years	Team	Apps	(Points)
1985–1997	Western Province	147	
International career
Years	Team	Apps	(Points)
1992–1994	South Africa	9	(0)
1992–1994	South Africa (tour)	22	(0)

Keith Steven Andrews (born 3 May 1962) is a South African former rugby union player.

== Playing career ==
Andrews completed his schooling at Selborne College in East London in the Eastern Cape, where played as a Flank. He also played Flank for the Western Province under–20 team after he moved to Cape Town to study at the University of Cape Town. He made his senior provincial debut for Western Province in 1985 as a Tighthead prop and spent 13 seasons with Western Province and was part of the Western Province team that won the Currie Cup in 1986 and 1997.

He made his test debut for the Springboks against England on 14 November 1992 at Twickenham in London. His last test match was the drawn test against New Zealand on 6 August 1994 at Eden Park in Auckland. Andrews played nine test matches and twenty–two tour matched for the Springboks.

=== Test history ===
No.	Opponents	Results (SA 1st)	Position	Tries	Dates	Venue
1.	England	16–33	Tighthead prop		14 Nov 1992	Twickenham, London
2.	France	20–20	Tighthead prop		26 Jun 1993	Kings Park Stadium, Durban
3.	France	17–18	Tighthead prop		3 Jul 1993	Ellis Park, Johannesburg
4.	Australia	19–12	Tighthead prop		31 Jul 1993	Sydney Football Stadium (SFG), Sydney
5.	Australia	20–28	Tighthead prop		14 Aug 1993	Ballymore Stadium, Brisbane
6.	Australia	12–19	Tighthead prop		21 Aug 1993	Sydney Football Stadium (SFG), Sydney
7.	Argentina	29–26	Tighthead prop		5 Nov 1993	Ferrocarril Oeste Stadium, Buenos Aires
8.	Argentina	52–23	Tighthead prop		13 Nov 1993	Ferrocarril Oeste Stadium, Buenos Aires
9.	New Zealand	18–18	Tighthead prop		6 Aug 1994	Eden Park, Auckland

== Accolades ==
Andrews was voted one of the five South African Young Players of the Year for 1986, along with Martin Knoetze, Hendrik Kruger, Tiaan Strauss and Frans Wessels.

== See also ==
- List of South Africa national rugby union players – Springbok no. 574
