= Schalk Burger (rugby union, born 1955) =

South African rugby union footballer

Schalk Burger Snr.
- Born: Schalk Willem Petrus Burger; 6 October 1955 (age 71) Cape Town, Western Cape, South Africa
- Height: 1.98 m (6 ft 6 in)
- Weight: 109 kg (240 lb)
- School: Paarl Gimnasium
- University: Stellenbosch University

Rugby union career
- Position: Lock
Provincial / State sides
Years	Team	Apps	(Points)
1974	North Western Cape		
1977–78, 84–87	Western Province	64	
1979–83	Eastern Province	72	
International career
Years	Team	Apps	(Points)
1984–86	South Africa	6	

Schalk Willem Petrus Burger Snr. (born 6 October 1955) is a South African former rugby union player.

== Playing career ==
Burger was born in Cape Town and received his schooling in Paarl, at Paarl Gimnasium. In 1973 he represented the Western Province schools rugby team at the Craven Week tournament. He made his senior provincial debut in 1974 for North Western Cape and in 1975 he enrolled at the University of Stellenbosch for a BCom degree, representing the Maties on the rugby field. Burger made his debut for Western Province in 1977 and after the 1978 season he moved to Eastern Province. During the period 1979 to 1983, Burger played 72 matches for Eastern Province, including 40 as captain. In 1984 he returned to Western Province.

Burger made his test match debut for the Springboks against the visiting England team on 2 June 1984 in Port Elizabeth. In 1986 he played in the four test matches against the New Zealand Cavaliers. Burger was capped 6 times for the Springboks.

=== Test history ===
No.	Opponents	Results (SA 1st)	Position	Points	Dates	Venue
1.	England	33–15	Lock		2 June 1984	Boet Erasmus Stadium, Port Elizabeth
2.	England	35–9	Lock		9 June 1984	Ellis Park, Johannesburg
3.	New Zealand Cavaliers	21–15	Lock		10 May 1986	Newlands, Cape Town
4.	New Zealand Cavaliers	18–19	Lock		17 May 1986	Kings Park, Durban
5.	New Zealand Cavaliers	33–18	Lock		24 May 1986	Loftus Versfeld, Pretoria
6.	New Zealand Cavaliers	24–10	Lock		31 May 1986	Ellis Park, Johannesburg

== Personal ==
Burger is the father of Schalk Burger, a former Springbok loose forward and captain.

== Accolades ==
Burger was one of the five nominees for 1985 SA Rugby player of the Year award. The other nominees for the award were Jannie Breedt, Gerrie Sonnekus, Danie Gerber and the eventual winner of the award, Naas Botha.

== See also ==
- List of South Africa national rugby union players – Springbok no. 535
