= Tiaan Strauss =

South African-born rugby union player

- Born: Christiaan Petrus Strauss; 28 June 1965 (age 61) Upington, Cape Province, South Africa
- Height: 6 ft 2 in (1.88 m)
- Weight: 16 st 5 lb (104 kg; 229 lb)
- School: Upington High School, Upington
- University: Stellenbosch University

Rugby union career
- Position(s): Number 8, Flank
Provincial / State sides
Years	Team	Apps	(Points)
1986–95	Western Province	156	
1998–2000	NSW Waratahs	36	
International career
Years	Team	Apps	(Points)
1992–94	South Africa	15	(20)
1999	Australia	11	(20)
- Rugby league career

Playing information
- Position: Forward
Club
Years	Team	Pld	T	G	FG	P
1996–97	Cronulla Sharks	14				4

Christiaan Petrus 'Tiaan' Strauss, (born 28 June 1965) is a former rugby union and rugby league footballer who represented both South Africa and Australia at international level in rugby union and also played top-level domestic rugby league in Australia. He won the 1999 Rugby World Cup with Australia and the Currie Cup with Western Province.

== Biography ==
Born in the town of Upington, Cape Province (now Northern Cape), Strauss attended the University of Stellenbosch, where he obtained his law degree in 1990. He made his senior provincial debut for Western Province in 1986 against North Eastern Cape and scored a try on debut. At the end of the 1986 provincial season he formed the Western Province back row with Gert Smal and Deon Lotter, that played a major role in Western Province's Currie Cup victory.

Strauss made his test debut for the Springboks during the 1992 tour of Britain and France, as Number 8 against France at the Stade de Gerland in Lyon. He went on to win 15 caps for the Springboks between 1992 and 1994, scoring 4 tries and captaining them on one occasion. He also made a record 156 appearances for Western Province during the team's golden period before he moved to Australia.

In Australia he played two seasons of rugby league with the Cronulla-Sutherland Sharks before switching back to rugby union for New South Wales. He was selected for Australia a total of 11 times, scoring a hat trick against Ireland on his debut. All but two of his caps were from the bench. He did make a capable replacement for Toutai Kefu in the 1999 World Cup Quarter Final in Cardiff when the former was banned but it turned out to be his last cap.

Strauss returned home to South Africa and settled with his family.

=== Rugby union test history ===
South Africa
No.	Opposition	Result (SA 1st)	Position	Tries	Date	Venue
1.	France	20–15	Number 8		17 October 1992	Stade de Gerland, Lyon
2.	France	16–29	Number 8		24 October 1992	Parc des Princes, Paris
3.	England	16–33	Flank	1	14 November 1992	Twickenham, London
4.	France	20–20	Flank		26 June 1993	Kings Park Stadium, Durban
5.	France	17–18	Number 8		3 July 1993	Ellis Park, Johannesburg
6.	Australia	19–12	Number 8		31 July 1993	Sydney Football Stadium (SFG), Sydney
7.	Australia	20–28	Number 8		14 August 1993	Ballymore Stadium, Brisbane
8.	Australia	12–19	Number 8		21 August 1993	Sydney Football Stadium (SFG), Sydney
9.	Argentina	29–26	Number 8		6 November 1993	Ferrocarril Oeste Stadium, Buenos Aires
10.	Argentina	52–23	Number 8	2	13 November 1993	Ferrocarril Oeste Stadium, Buenos Aires
11.	England	15–32	Number 8		4 June 1994	Loftus Versveld, Pretoria
12.	New Zealand	14–22	Flank (c)		9 July 1994	Carisbrook, Dunedin
13.	New Zealand	9–13	Flank		23 July 1994	Athletic Park, Wellington
14.	Argentina	42–22	Number 8	1	8 October 1994	Boet Erasmus, Port Elizabeth
15.	Argentina	46–26	Number 8		15 October 1994	Ellis Park, Johannesburg
Australia
No.	Opposition	Result (Aus 1st)	Position	Tries	Date	Venue
1.	Ireland	46–11	Substitute	3	12 June 1999	Ballymore Stadium, Brisbane
2.	Ireland	32–26	Substitute		19 June 1999	Subiaco Oval, Perth
3.	England	22–15	Substitute		26 June 1999	Stadium Australia, Sydney
4.	South Africa	32–6	Substitute		17 July 1999	Lang Park, Brisbane
5.	New Zealand	15–34	Number 8		24 July 1999	Eden Park, Auckland
6.	South Africa	9–10	Substitute		14 August 1999	Newlands, Cape Town
7.	New Zealand	28–7	Substitute		28 August 1999	Stadium Australia, Sydney
8.	Romania	57–9	Substitute		3 October 1999	Ravenhill Stadium, Belfast
9.	Ireland	23–3	Substitute		10 October 1999	Lansdowne Road, Dublin
10.	United States	55–19	Flank	1	14 October 1999	Thomond Park, Limerick
11.	Wales	24–9	Number 8		14 October 1999	Millennium Stadium, Cardiff

== Honours ==
- Currie Cup: Winner (with Western Province) 1986, 1989 (shared). Finalist 1995
- World Cup: Winner (with Wallabies) 1999

== See also ==
- List of South Africa national rugby union players – Springbok no. 579
- List of Australia national rugby union players – no. 752

Sporting positions
Preceded by Francois Pienaar	Springbok Captain; 1994	Succeeded by Adriaan Richter
