= Robert du Preez =

Robert du Preez may refer to:

- Robert du Preez (rugby union, born 1963), born 1963, a South African rugby union coach and former South Africa national rugby union international
- Robert du Preez (rugby union, born 1993), born 1993, a South African rugby union player
