= Marty Roebuck =

Australian former rugby union footballer (born 1965)

Marty Roebuck (born 10 January 1965 in Lithgow, New South Wales) is an Australian former rugby union footballer who represented New South Wales Waratahs and the Australian Wallabies as a fullback.

== Early life and education ==
Roebuck was educated at St Stanislaus College, Bathurst; the University of Sydney's Cumberland (Faculty of Health Sciences) Campus, Lidcombe; and University of Notre Dame Australia, Sydney, Darlinghurst.

== Career ==
Roebuck was a physiotherapist and played rugby in his spare time when the game was an amateur sport.

Since 2015, Roebuck had graduated as a medical doctor from the Notre Dame University in Sydney. He is currently continuing his medical profession as a general practitioner.

=== Sporting career ===
A Test regular from his debut in 1991 against Wales, in the 63–3 annihilation in which he scored two tries, Roebuck went on to win the 1991 Rugby World Cup with Australia. On the tour to Europe, he took kicking duties from Michael Lynagh who had been Australia's regular kicker since 1984. In 1991, his Waratahs team went through the competition undefeated.

Roebuck's 23rd and final Test was against France on 6 November 1993, with the Wallabies winning 24–3. Roebuck scored all the points except for Tim Gavin's try. He announced his retirement immediately after the game.
