= Fidelity ADT =

South African private security company

- Type: Private
- Industry: Security
- Founded: March 16, 2017; 9 years ago (after Fidelity bought ADT)
- Headquarters: Midrand, Gauteng, South Africa
- Areas served: South Africa
- Key people: Wahl Bartmann (CEO of Fidelity Services Group)
- Services: Security services
- Number of employees: c. 5,000 (2025)
- Parent: New Seasons Security Services (NSSS)
- Divisions: SSG Holdings
- Website: adt.co.za

Fidelity ADT is a South African private security company, that provides fixed neighborhood security monitoring services (by means of cameras and armed patrols); subscription-based, 24-hour residential and commercial armed response; electronic security installation and maintenance; and other related security, fire, and cleaning services throughout South Africa. Fidelity ADT is the largest private security company in South Africa.

Headquartered in Midrand, Gauteng, the company has been operating since 2017. It was established when security company Fidelity Services Group, which had been in operation for over 50 years, bought the South African operations of another security company, ADT, from Tyco International, for R2 billion.

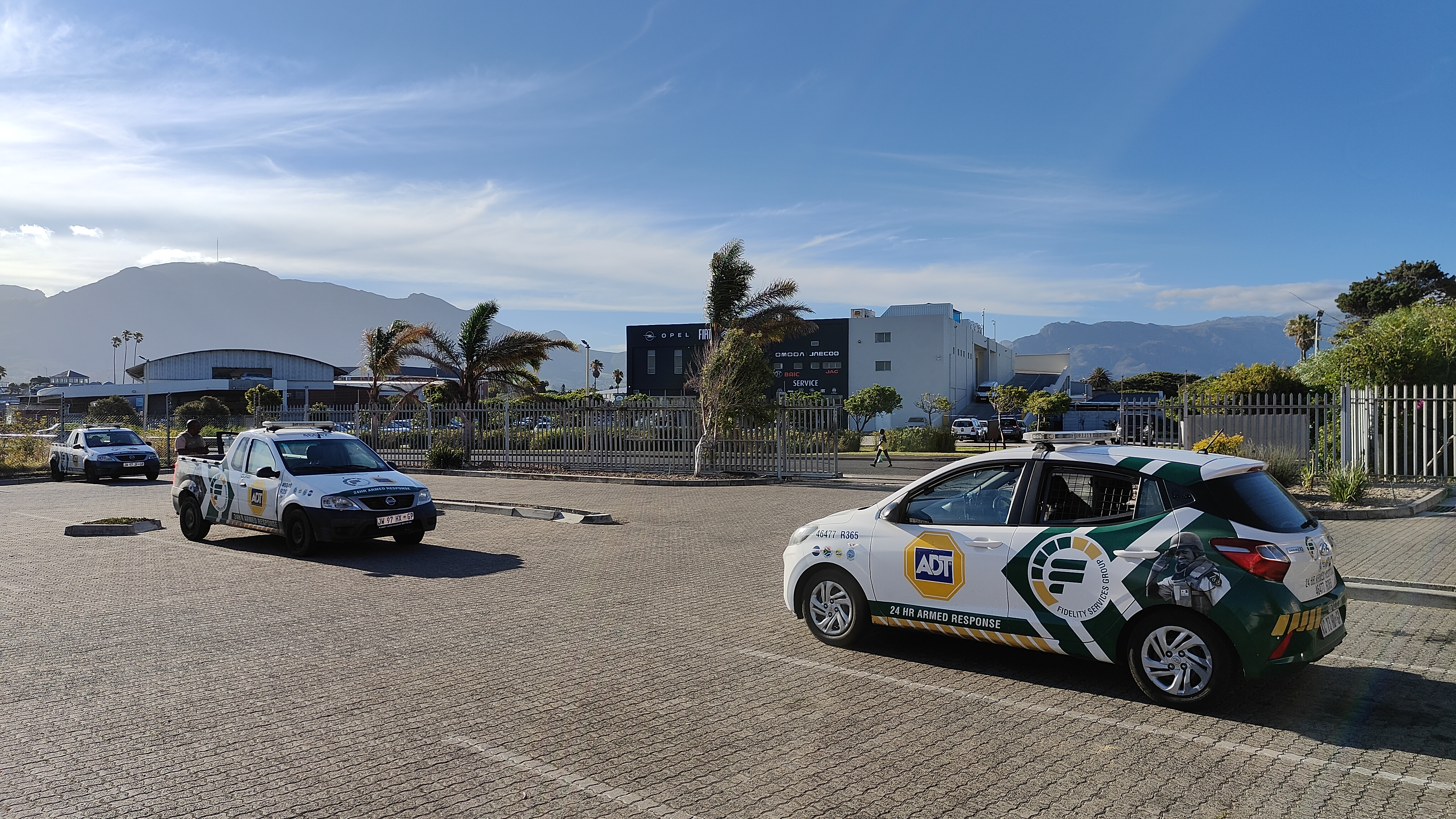
Fidelity ADT vehicles in Tokai, Cape Town, South Africa

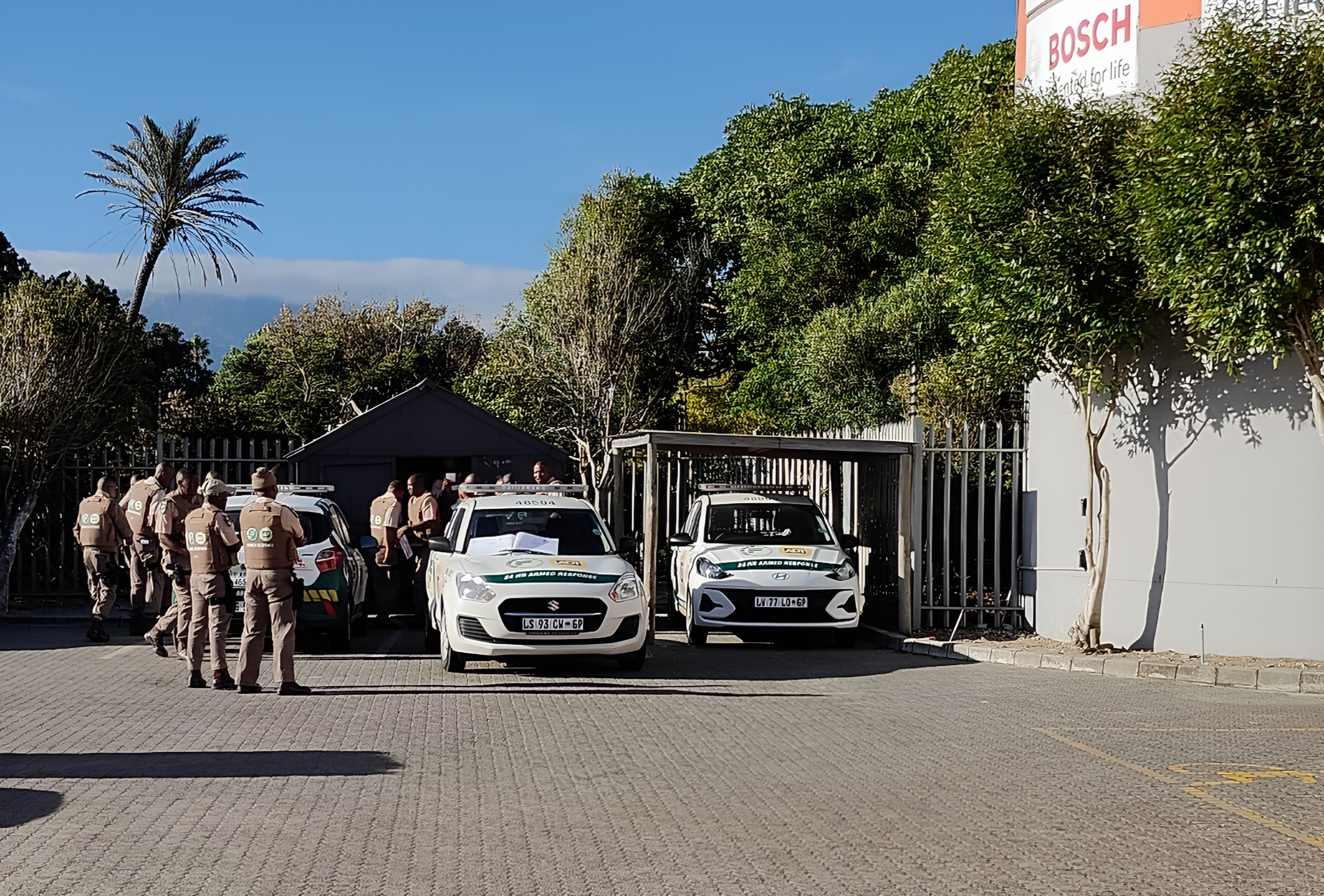
Fidelity ADT armed response officers, and vehicles, in Tokai, Cape Town, South Africa

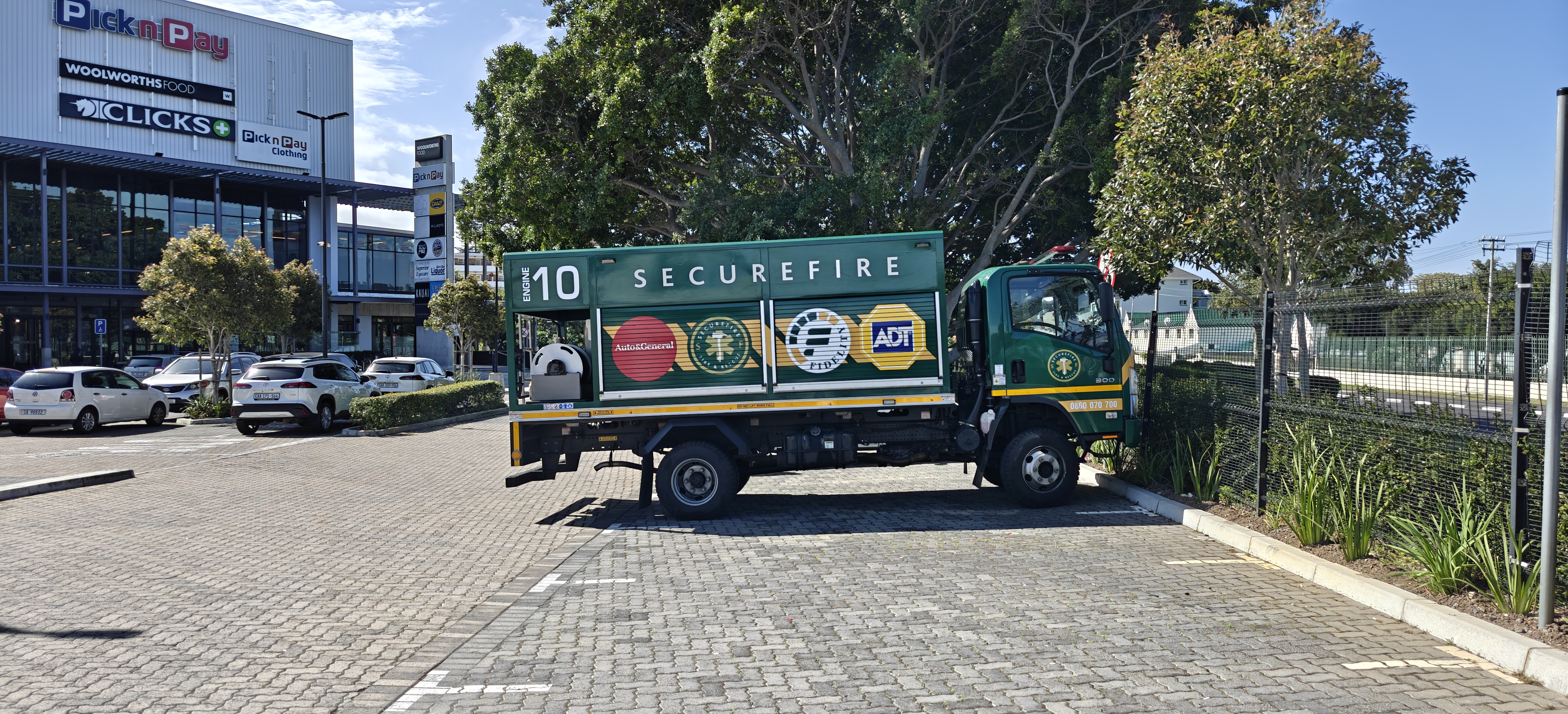
Fidelity ADT SecureFire response vehicle

== History ==
Fidelity ADT was formed in 2017, through Fidelity Services Group's acquisition of Tyco International's ADT South Africa security business, following approval from South Africa's Competition Tribunal. This deal saw Fidelity Services Group absorb ADT's then-total of 365,000 clients.

In August 2024, Fidelity ADT was awarded two of consultancy PMR Africa's Golden Arrow Awards, for its effort to fight crime, and for its efforts in the security sector, over the preceding 12 months, to stimulate economic growth and development in the KwaZulu-Natal province of South Africa. The Golden Arrow Award is given to businesses to represent effectiveness, excellence, leadership, and resilience, as well as to indicate customer service and satisfaction with the company.

In May 2025, the South African Competition Commission recommended that the Competition Tribunal approve a transaction whereby Fidelity ADT would buy SSG Holdings, a company that provides, among other things, guarding services, and technical and electronic security services.

To address competition concerns, the Commission ensured that the parties agreed that any restraints of trade implemented post-merger will be limited in duration to not more than three years and be limited to the activities conducted by SSG. Furthermore, Fidelity ADT undertook to allow qualifying workers of SSG to participate in Fidelity ADT's employee share ownership scheme.

In the same month, the Commission also approved the proposal for New Seasons Security Services (NSSS) to acquire Fidelity ADT, without conditions. NSSS is an investment holding company which was created specifically for purposes of the transaction. The aim of NSSS is the “strategic simplification” of its shareholding structure, as well as to bring about enhanced liquidity for all shareholders, with a particular focus on the group's longstanding BBBEE partners.

In June 2025, Fidelity ADT launched SecureFire, a private firefighting response service. Launched as a subscription service for residential and commercial clients, Fidelity ADT said the service would roll out nationally, and that all of the company's armed response officers in Cape Town had been trained as first responders.

== Operations ==
The company has over 5,000 trained armed response officers, and operates 40 branches, which are supported by its Specialised Services Unit; geared towards tactical interventions.

It also operates a Community information Centre at its offices in Gqeberha, Eastern Cape. This center maintains a membership network, and assesses statistics and feedback from community bodies, such as neighborhood watch groups.

Fidelity ADT provides services to residential and commercial clients across South Africa, as well as outside the country's borders. The company's services and products include 24-hour CCTV surveillance, access control, smartphone-based remote home control, license plate recognition cameras, safe home entry service (armed guard escort), electric fencing, community control rooms and managers, patrol vehicles, and armed guards.

Fidelity ADT provides services to over 70% of South African retailers.

Fidelity Services Group is South Africa’s largest Black-owned integrated security solutions provider, with a 51% Black Economic Empowerment (BEE) shareholding, and 100% South African ownership.

The company is a registered, licensed security services provider, as per regulations set forth in the Private Security Industry Regulation Act 56 of 2001 (PSIRA).

== Training ==
All Fidelity ADT team members undergo a strict recruitment and selection process, after which they undergo a minimum of two security clearance checks, as well as a certified psychoanalysis test, prior to being offered an opportunity to join the company.

Fidelity ADT's Armed Response Officers are all professionally trained in the usage of firearms, crime scene management, and first aid.

== VumaCam SafeCity Initiative ==
Fidelity ADT has partnered with South African fiber network operator Vumatel to assist with providing security services in Gauteng by using Vumatel's Vumacams to provide a live feed to the Fidelity ADT command and control centers.

Vumacam operates over 18,000 CCTV cameras, and connects vetted security partners with the South African Police Service (SAPS), as well as with the Gauteng Provincial Government; as part of a public-private partnership (PPP). These cameras actively monitor over 7,000 public spaces across the province of Gauteng, and read, on average, around 12 million license plates per day (almost 7,000 per minute), flagging approximately 55,000 Vehicles of Interest on its Proof Platform each day.

Vumacam's purpose is to use technology to foster collaboration between the private and public sectors. It does so through its SafeCity Initiative, to serve and protect South African communities. Currently, the SafeCity Initiative is active in the cities of Ekurhuleni, Tshwane, and Johannesburg.

== Corporate social investment ==
In terms of corporate social responsibility (CSR) initiatives, among other endeavors, through its Transformation, Social, and Ethics Committee, Fidelity Services Group, has social investment initiatives in place to support education, training, sporting, and other charitable initiatives.

The company operates the Fidelity Foundation, whose goal is to empower communities in impoverished areas to live productive, healthy, and fulfilling lives through Fidelity Services Group's focus areas of education, health, sports, and entrepreneurship. This includes providing grants to small businesses; participating in initiatives that contribute to the reduction of crime South Africa; and creating sustainable programs that will provide permanent life skills, such as training for Early Childhood Development (ECD) teachers.

== See also ==
- Private security industry in South Africa
