= Darren Junee =

- Born: Darren Kevin Junee; 2 July 1969 (age 57)
- Notable relative: Kevin Junee (father)
- Occupation: Teacher

Rugby union career
- Position: Utility back
Senior career
Years	Team	Apps	(Points)
1989–1990	Eastwood Rugby Club		
1991–1994	Randwick DRUFC		
1998–2001	Northern Suburbs		
Super Rugby
Years	Team	Apps	(Points)
1989–01	NSW Waratahs	56	
International career
Years	Team	Apps	(Points)
1989–94	Australia	4	
National sevens team
Years	Team		Comps
1990–93	Australia 7s		
- Rugby league career

Playing information
- Position: Fullback
Club
Years	Team	Pld	T	G	FG	P
1995–98	Sydney Roosters	51	25	0	0	100

Darren Kevin Junee (born 2 July 1969) is an Australian former rugby union and rugby league footballer. He was an Australian rugby union representative and had a first grade rugby league career with the Sydney Roosters in the NSWRFL competition.

== Family and early life ==
Junee is the son of Australian rugby league representative Kevin Junee. He was educated at St. Joseph's College, Hunters Hill from 1981 to 1987 where he played rugby union and featured in the school's first XVs of 1986 and 1987.

== Rugby union career ==
Junee made the Australian schoolboys' rugby union representative side of 1987 and the Australian U21s and the AIS U21s sides in 1988, 1989 and 1990. His club rugby was with the Eastwood Rugby Club and later the Randwick DRUFC.

He made his Australian representative debut on the Australia national rugby union team's 1989 tour of Canada and France. He made a total of four Test appearances for the Wallabies – two against France, one against Western Samoa and a Bledisloe Cup win against New Zealand. He also made the 1990 Wallaby tour to New Zealand and the 1992 tours of Europe and South Africa and played for Australia in a further 22 tour matches.

From 1990 to 1992 he played in the Australia national rugby sevens team and toured with that side to Hong Kong and Uruguay.

Following his rugby league stint he returned to union in 1998. From 1999 to 2001 he played for the Northern Suburbs Rugby Club in the Shute Shield and the NSW Waratahs in Super Rugby. All told he made 56 appearances for the NSW Waratahs.

== Rugby league career ==
Junee switched to rugby league in 1995 and joined the Sydney City Roosters where his father had played. He was a fullback and utility three-quarter, who made 63 first grade appearances for the club between 1995 and 1998. His league career was hampered by injury and in 1997 he was dropped in favour of the new Roosters arrival Jack Elsegood. He is perhaps best known for a solo, chip and chase try scored for the Roosters in an enthralling victory over the Brisbane Broncos in front of 35,000 people on a Monday night in 1996, that has since gone down in Rugby League folklore.

== Professional career ==
From 2001 to 2018 Junee was a science teacher and boarding house master at St. Joseph's College, Hunters Hill where he coached various sports including rugby. In 2019 he commenced a role as Head of School House at Sydney Church of England Grammar School.
