= Paul Kahl =

Australian rugby union international

- Full name: Paul Raymond Kahl
- Born: 4 April 1969 (age 57) Brisbane, Australia

Rugby union career
- Position: Fly-half
International career
Years	Team	Apps	(Points)
1992	Australia	1	(0)

Paul Raymond Kahl (born 4 April 1969) is an Australian former rugby union international.

Born in Brisbane, Kahl captained the 1st VX at Brisbane State High School and was an Australian Schools representative player, before debuting for Queensland at the age of 19. He played first-grade for Brisbane club Easts.

Kahl, a fly-half, toured South Africa in 1992 with the Wallabies, as an understudy to Michael Lynagh. He kept his place for the end of year tour of Britain and Ireland, during which Lynagh dislocated his shoulder, opening up the fly-half position. Despite mixed form in his tour appearances, Kahl was chosen for the Test against Wales in Cardiff, earning his only Wallabies cap. He announced his retirement from rugby in 1996.

== See also ==
- List of Australia national rugby union players
