= Faffa Knoetze =

South African rugby union footballer

- Born: Francois Knoetze; 18 January 1963 (age 63) Parow, Cape Town, Western Cape
- Height: 1.72 m (5 ft 8 in)
- Weight: 77 kg (170 lb)
- School: Tygerberg High School, Parow, Western Cape
- University: Stellenbosch University
- Occupation: Actuary

Rugby union career
- Position: Centre
Amateur team(s)
Years	Team	Apps	(Points)
- Maties
–	Cape Town Defence		
Provincial / State sides
Years	Team	Apps	(Points)
1984–1993	Western Province	110	
International career
Years	Team	Apps	(Points)
1989–1992	South Africa	2	

Francois 'Faffa' Knoetze (born 18 January 1963) is a former South African rugby union player that played two tests for the Springboks as a centre.

== Playing career ==
After finishing school, Knoetze furthered his studies at Stellenbosch University. At university he played for the Maties under–20 side and was selected for the Western Province under–20 team and the South Africa Universities under–20 team. His first match for the Western Province senior team was in 1984 against South Western Districts. Knoetze was part of the Western Province team that won the Currie Cup in 1985 and in 1986. He played 110 matches for Western Province, scoring 43 tries.

Knoetze made his test debut for the Springboks against the World XV on 26 August 1989 at his home ground, Newlands in Cape Town. He also played in the second test against the World XV and went on the 1992 South Africa tour of France and England. He played in six tour matches for the Springboks and scored two tries.

=== Test history ===
No.	Opponents	Results(RSA 1st)	Position	Tries	Dates	Venue
1.	World XV	20–19	Centre	1	26 Aug 1989	Newlands, Cape Town
2.	World XV	22–16	Centre		2 Sep 1989	Ellis Park, Johannesburg

== Accolades ==
In 1985, Knoetze was one of the five Young Players of the Year, along with Schalk Burger (born 1963), Deon Coetzee, Christo Ferreira and Giepie Nel.

== See also ==
- List of South Africa national rugby union players – Springbok no. 553
