= Botha Rossouw =

South African rugby union footballer (1969–2023)

- Born: Paul Botha Rossouw; 3 November 1969 Pretoria, Gauteng, South Africa
- Died: 29 August 2023 (aged 53)
- Height: 1.98 m (6 ft 6 in)
- Weight: 115 kg (254 lb)
- School: Tom Naude Technical High School, Pietersburg
- University: Potchefstroom University

Rugby union career
- Position: Flanker
Provincial / State sides
Years	Team	Apps	(Points)
1990–1993	Western Transvaal	39	
1994–1996	Northern Transvaal	31	
1997–1998	South Western Districts	36	
International career
Years	Team	Apps	(Points)
1992	South Africa (tour)	2	

Paul Botha Rossouw (3 November 1969 – 29 August 2023) was a South African rugby union player.

== Playing career ==
Rossouw represented Far North at the annual Craven Week tournament in 1987. He made his debut for Western Transvaal in 1990 and in 1994 he relocated to Northern Transvaal. Rossouw toured with the Springboks to France and England in 1992 but sustained an injury and had to return to South Africa and was replaced by FC Smit. Rossouw did not play in any test matches on tour, but played in two tour matches for the Springboks.

== Death ==
Botha Rossouw died on 29 August 2023, at the age of 53.

== See also ==
- List of South Africa national rugby union players – Springbok no. 578
