= Jannie Breedt =

South African rugby union footballer

- Born: Johannes Christoffel Breedt; 4 June 1959 (age 67) Kempton Park, Gauteng
- Height: 1.93 m (6 ft 4 in)
- Weight: 98 kg (216 lb)
- School: Kempton Park High School

Rugby union career
- Position(s): Number 8, Flank
Provincial / State sides
Years	Team	Apps	(Points)
1981–1984	Northern Transvaal	47	
1985–1992	Transvaal	118	
International career
Years	Team	Apps	(Points)
1986–1992	South Africa	8	

Johannes Christoffel Breedt (born 4 June 1959) is a South African former rugby union player.

== Playing career ==
Breedt played for Northern Transvaal and Transvaal in the South African provincial competitions. He made his debut for Northern Transvaal in 1981 and in 1985 he relocated to Transvaal. He played 118 matches for Transvaal and captained the side on a 102 occasions, the first player to captain the province more than a hundred times. He led his team to four Currie Cup finals, finishing runner–up on each occasion.

Breedt made his test debut for the Springboks against the visiting New Zealand Cavaliers on 10 May 1986 at Newlands in Cape Town. In 1989, Breedt was appointed as Springbok captain for the two test matches against the World XV and so became the 41st Springbok test captain. He was capped 8 times for the Springboks.

=== Test history ===
No.	Opposition	Result (SA 1st)	Position	Tries	Date	Venue
1.	New Zealand Cavaliers	21–15	Number 8		10 May 1986	Newlands, Cape Town
2.	New Zealand Cavaliers	18–19	Number 8		17 May 1986	Kings Park, Durban
3.	New Zealand Cavaliers	33–18	Number 8		24 May 1986	Loftus Versfeld, Pretoria
4.	New Zealand Cavaliers	24–10	Number 8		31 May 1986	Ellis Park, Johannesburg
5.	World XV	20–19	Number 8 (c)		26 Aug 1989	Newlands, Cape Town
6.	World XV	22–16	Number 8 (c)		2 Sep 1989	Ellis Park, Johannesburg
7.	New Zealand	24–27	Number 8		15 Aug 1992	Ellis Park, Johannesburg
8.	Australia	3–26	Number 8		22 Aug 1992	Newlands, Cape Town

== Accolades ==
Breedt was one of the five nominees for 1985 SA Rugby player of the Year award. The other nominees for the award were Schalk Burger, Gerrie Sonnekus, Danie Gerber and the eventual winner of the award, Naas Botha.

== See also ==
- List of South Africa national rugby union players – Springbok no. 547
- List of South Africa national rugby union team captains

Sporting positions
Preceded by Naas Botha	Springbok Captain; 1989	Succeeded by Francois Pienaar
