= Jacques Olivier (rugby union) =

South African rugby union footballer

- Born: Jacques Olivier; 13 November 1968 (age 58) Pretoria, South Africa
- Height: 1.80 m (5 ft 11 in)
- Weight: 90 kg (200 lb)
- School: Die Hoërskool Menlopark
- University: University of Pretoria

Rugby union career
- Position: Wing
Provincial / State sides
Years	Team	Apps	(Points)
1991–2000	Northern Transvaal	137	(375)
2001–2002	Pumas		
International career
Years	Team	Apps	(Points)
1992–1996	South Africa	17	(15)
National sevens team
Years	Team		Comps
1993, 97–2001	South Africa		17

Jacques Olivier (born 13 November 1968 in Pretoria, South Africa) is a former South African rugby union player.

== Playing career ==
Olivier started his career in Pretoria, making his debut for Northern Transvaal in 1990. He played 137 matches for the Northern Transvaal or the Blue Bulls and scored 75 tries, including a record seven tries in a Currie Cup match for Northern Transvaal against South Western Districts during the 1996 season. In 2001, Olivier joined the Pumas and played two seasons for the union.

Olivier made his test debut for the Springboks on 17 October 1992 against France at Stade de Gerland in Lyon. He played 17 tests for the Springboks, scoring three tries and also played a further 17 tour matches in which he scored 10 tries.

=== Test history ===
No.	Opposition	Result (SA 1st)	Position	Tries	Date	Venue
1.	France	20–15	Wing		17 October 1992	Stade de Gerland, Lyon
2.	France	16–29	Wing		24 October 1992	Parc des Princes, Paris
3.	England	16–33	Wing		14 November 1992	Twickenham, London
4.	France	20–20	Wing		26 June 1993	Kings Park, Durban
5.	France	17–18	Wing		3 July 1993	Ellis Park, Johannesburg
6.	Australia	19–12	Wing		31 July 1993	Sydney Football Stadium (SFG), Sydney
7.	Australia	20–28	Wing	1	14 August 1993	Ballymore Stadium, Brisbane
8.	Australia	12–19	Wing		21 August 1993	Sydney Football Stadium (SFG), Sydney
9.	Argentina	29–26	Wing		6 November 1993	Ferrocarril Oeste Stadium, Buenos Aires
10.	Wales	40–11	Wing		2 September 1995	Ellis Park, Johannesburg
11.	Italy	40–21	Replacement		12 November 1995	Stadio Olimpico, Rome
12.	England	24–14	Wing		18 November 1995	Twickenham, London
13.	Argentina	46–15	Wing		9 November 1996	Ferrocarril Oeste Stadium, Buenos Aires
14.	Argentina	44–21	Wing	1	16 November 1996	Ferrocarril Oeste Stadium, Buenos Aires
15.	France	22–12	Wing		30 November 1996	Stade Chaban-Delmas, Bordeaux
16.	France	13–12	Wing		7 December 1996	Parc des Princes, Paris
17.	Wales	37–20	Wing	1	15 December 1996	Cardiff Arms Park, Cardiff

== Accolades ==
Olivier was voted as one of the five Young Players of the Year for 1991, along with Hennie le Roux, Pieter Hendriks, Pieter Muller and Johan Nel.

== See also ==
- List of South Africa national rugby union players – Springbok no. 570
- List of South Africa national rugby sevens players
