= Kevin Junee =

Australia international rugby league footballer

Personal information
- Born: 1 August 1943 (age 82)

Playing information
- Position: Halfback
Club
Years	Team	Pld	T	G	FG	P
1964–73	Eastern Suburbs	165	62	0	1	188
1974–75	Manly-Warringah	38	29	0	0	87
1976	Eastern Suburbs	1	0	0	0	0
	Total	204	91	0	1	275
Representative
Years	Team	Pld	T	G	FG	P
1965–68	New South Wales	5	3	0	0	9
1967–68	Australia	0	0	0	0	0
- Relatives: Darren Junee (son)

Kevin Junee (born 1 August 1943) is an Australian former rugby league footballer who played as a halfback in the 1960s and 1970s.

An Australian international and New South Wales interstate representative back, he played his club football in the New South Wales Rugby Football League premiership for Sydney teams Eastern Suburbs and Manly-Warringah.

== Family ==
Junee is of Russian and Greek descent. He grew up in Paddington, Sydney and attended Paddington Public School. He attended technical college and trained as a fitter and turner. Junee has been married to Frances since 1967. They have two daughters (Natalie and Tiffanny) and one son (Darren). His eldest two children, Natalie and Darren are both school teachers. Darren is also an Australian dual code rugby league and rugby union player Darren Junee who also played rugby league for the Sydney City Roosters (Easts Leagues Club) between 1995 and 1998. His youngest, Tiffanny - a former rugby union journalist - is a sessional lecturer with the Media and Communications Department at the University of Sydney, Australia. Junee's Easts teammate, Mark Mark Harris along with his wife Maureen, are godparents to his daughter, Tiffanny.

== Career ==
Junee played all his junior rugby league in the Eastern Suburbs area for both the Paddington Colts and Bondi United junior clubs. Junee then made the Eastern Suburbs top grade in 1964 - the bleakest period in the club's history, winning just 2 matches that year and just 3 more in the following two. However this didn't stop Junee from breaking into the representative scene. In 1965, the speedy halfback was chosen for New South Wales and at the end of the 1967 NSWRFL season was selected for the 1967–68 Kangaroo Tour, becoming Kangaroo No. 422, though he did not play in a test match on the tour. In the 1970 NSWRFL season Junee was awarded the Rothmans Medal – rugby league's leading player award presented annually to the year's best player. Premiership success was one of the few things that eluded Junee throughout his career. The closest he came was in 1972 when he was a member of the Eastern Suburbs side that was defeated by Manly in that year's Grand Final 19–14.

At the end of the 1973 season, Junee left Easts to join Manly in 1974 after a player swap brought his former halfback rival at Easts (and a 1973 premiership winner with Manly), Johnny Mayes back to the club. That year, Eastern Suburbs won their first premiership since 1945 and won again in 1975, losing only three games all season. To rub salt into these wounds, Mayes had just won a premiership with Manly in 1973 and was part of these two premiership winning sides. While playing for the Sea Eagles during the 1974 NSWRFL season Junee topped the season's try-scoring list with 23 tries, a club record at the time and still second all-time season for the club (as of 2017), only beaten by Phil Blake who crossed for 27 in 1983. Junee scored only 6 tries for Manly in 1975.

Junee returned to Easts for his final season in 1976 (Manly won the 1976 premiership), displacing Mayes at halfback before the emergence of an up-and-coming Kevin Hastings. Junee, who played 159 matches for Eastern Suburbs, has been made a life member of the club.

== Post Playing ==
Junee founded a chain of sports stores with business partner Tony Rule in the late 60's / early 70's called Kevin Junee's Run For Your Life sports stores. The original store was located in Bondi Junction. Additional stores opened up in Angel Arcade in Sydney's CBD; Kingsford, Liverpool, Bankstown and Roselands.
