= Heinrich Rodgers =

South African rugby union footballer

- Born: Pieter Heinrich Rodgers; 23 June 1962 (age 64) Harrismith, Free State
- Height: 1.82 m (6 ft 0 in)
- Weight: 106 kg (234 lb)
- School: Harrismith High School
- University: University of Pretoria

Rugby union career
- Position(s): Loosehead prop, Tighthead prop
Provincial / State sides
| Years | Team | Apps | (Points) |
| 1984–91, 94–95 | Northern Transvaal | 116 | |
| 1992–93 | Transvaal | | |
International career
| Years | Team | Apps | (Points) |
| 1989–93 | South Africa | 5 | |

Pieter Heinrich Rodgers (born 23 June 1962) is a South African former rugby union player.

== Playing career ==
Rodgers went to school in Harrismith in the Free State and represented Eastern Free State at the annual Craven Week tournament in 1980. After finishing school, Rodgers moved to Pretoria to study at the University of Pretoria. He made his provincial debut for Northern Transvaal in 1984. Rodgers also played for Transvaal, but finished his career with Northern Transvaal. Although he was known as a specialist loosehead prop, he could also pack down on the tighthead side.

Rodgers made his test debut for the Springboks against the World XV on 26 August 1989 at Newlands in Cape Town. He also played in the second test against the World XV as well as the 1992 match against the All Blacks. Rodgers toured with the Springboks to England and France in 1992, playing in the two test matches against France. He also played in seven tour matches for the Springboks.

=== Test history ===
| No. | Opponents | Results(RSA 1st) | Position | Tries | Dates | Venue |
|---|---|---|---|---|---|---|
| 1. | World XV | 20–19 | Loosehead prop | | 26 Aug 1989 | Newlands, Cape Town |
| 2. | World XV | 22–16 | Loosehead prop | | 2 Sep 1989 | Ellis Park, Johannesburg |
| 3. | New Zealand | 24–27 | Loosehead prop | | 15 Aug 1992 | Ellis Park, Johannesburg |
| 4. | France | 20–15 | Tighthead prop | | 17 Oct 1992 | Stade de Gerland, Lyon |
| 5. | France | 16–29 | Tighthead prop | | 24 Oct 1992 | Parc des Princes, Paris |

== See also ==
- List of South Africa national rugby union players – Springbok no. 554
