= Johan Styger =

South African rugby union footballer

- Born: Johannes Jakobus Styger; 31 January 1962 (age 64) Bloemfontein, Free State, South Africa
- Height: 1.83 m (6 ft 0 in)
- Weight: 105 kg (231 lb)
- School: Grey College, Bloemfontein
- University: University of Pretoria

Rugby union career
- Position: Loosehead prop
Provincial / State sides
Years	Team	Apps	(Points)
1983–1986	Northern Transvaal	13	
1987–1993	Free State	123	
International career
Years	Team	Apps	(Points)
1992–1993	South Africa	7	

Johannes Jakobus Styger (born 31 January 1962) is a South African former rugby union player, who played loosehead prop.

== Playing career ==
Styger made his provincial debut for Northern Transvaal in 1983. In 1987 he joined Free State and continued his career in Bloemfontein.

He made his test debut for the Springboks as a replacement for Heinrich Rodgers after 24 minutes in the second half in the test against the New Zealand All Blacks on 15 Augustus 1992 at Ellis Park in Johannesburg. His first start for the Springboks was in the next test on 22 August 1992 at Newlands in Cape Town against Australia. Styger toured with the Springboks to France and England in 1992 and to Australia in 1993. He played in seven test matches and eleven tour matches for the Springboks.

=== Test history ===
No.	Opposition	Result (SA 1st)	Position	Tries	Date	Venue
1.	New Zealand	24–27	Replacement		15 August 1992	Ellis Park, Johannesburg
2.	Australia	3–26	Loosehead prop		22 August 1992	Newlands, Cape Town
3.	France	20–15	Loosehead prop		17 October 1992	Stade de Gerland, Lyon
4.	France	16–29	Loosehead prop		24 October 1992	Parc des Princes, Paris
5.	England	16–33	Loosehead prop		14 November 1992	Twickenham, London
6.	France	17–18	Replacement		3 July 1993	Ellis Park, Johannesburg
7.	Australia	12–19	Replacement		21 August 1993	Sydney Football Stadium (SFG), Sydney

== See also ==
- List of South Africa national rugby union players – Springbok no. 566
