= Deon Oosthuysen =

South African rugby union player

- Born: Deon Eugene Oosthuysen; 4 December 1963 (age 62) Vanderbijlpark, South Africa
- Height: 1.72 m (5 ft 7 1/2 in)
- Weight: 82 kg (181 lb)
- School: Driehoek High, Vanderbijlpark

Rugby union career
- Position: Wing
Provincial / State sides
Years	Team	Apps	(Points)
1986–1987	Western Transvaal	16	
1988–1994	Northern Transvaal	140	
International career
Years	Team	Apps	(Points)
1992–1993	South Africa	0	(20)

Deon Eugene Oosthuysen (born 4 December 1963 in Vanderbijlpark, South Africa) is a former South African rugby player. He never played in a test match, but played for South Africa in 12 tour matches.

== Rugby career ==
He played for Western Transvaal (now known as the Leopards) and Northern Transvaal at provincial level. He was known for having a lot of pace and scored 85 tries in 140 matches for Northern Transvaal, which is, at the time of writing (2016), still a record for any Northern Transvaal/Blue Bulls player. Although he originally retired from playing in 1994 due to a hip injury, he made a comeback in 1996.

In addition to playing in 12 tour matches and scoring four tries for South Africa, he was also an accomplished sevens player and was for a while coach of the South African sevens team in the late 1990s.

== See also ==
- List of South Africa national rugby union players – Springbok no. 571
