= Willie Hills =

South African rugby union footballer

- Born: Willem Gerhardus Hills; 26 January 1962 (age 64) Pretoria, South Africa
- Height: 1.80 m (5 ft 11 in)
- Weight: 118 kg (260 lb)
- School: Pretoria–Tuine Technical High School

Rugby union career
- Position(s): Hooker, Loosehead prop
Amateur team(s)
Years	Team	Apps	(Points)
- Pretoria Police RC
Provincial / State sides
Years	Team	Apps	(Points)
1990–1994	Northern Transvaal	49	
International career
Years	Team	Apps	(Points)
1992–1993	South Africa	6	(0)
1992–1993	South Africa (tour)	7	(0)

Willem Gerhardus "Willie" Hills (born 26 January 1962) is a former South African rugby union player.

== Playing career ==
Hills represented the Northern Transvaal Schools team and under–20 team as a flanker and made his debut for the Northern Transvaal senior team in 1990, playing hooker. Hills toured with the Springboks to France and England in 1992, when he was originally included at tighthead, and made his test debut at hooker against France on 17 October 1992 at Stade de Gerland in Lyon. Hills got injured in the first test against Australia in 1993, playing loosehead, effectively ending his test career. He played six test matches and seven tour matches for the Springboks.

=== Test history ===
No.	Opponents	Results (RSA 1st)	Position	Tries	Dates	Venue
1.	France	20–15	Hooker		17 Oct 1992	Stade de Gerland, Lyon
2.	France	16–29	Hooker		24 Oct 1992	Parc des Princes, Paris
3.	England	16–33	Hooker		14 Nov 1992	Twickenham, London
4.	France	20–20	Loosehead prop		26 Jun 1993	Kings Park Stadium, Durban
5.	France	17–18	Loosehead prop		3 Jul 1993	Ellis Park, Johannesburg
6.	Australia	19–12	Loosehead prop		31 Jul 1993	Sydney Football Stadium, Sydney

== See also ==
- List of South Africa national rugby union players – Springbok no. 575
