= Drikus Hattingh =

South African rugby union footballer

- Born: Hendrikus Hattingh; 21 February 1968 (age 58) Rustenburg, North West
- Height: 1.94 m (6 ft 4 in)
- Weight: 115 kg (254 lb)
- School: Rustenburg High School

Rugby union career
Provincial / State sides
Years	Team	Apps	(Points)
1991–1995	Northern Transvaal	64	
International career
Years	Team	Apps	(Points)
1992–1994	South Africa	5	(0)

Hendrikus 'Drikus' Hattingh (born 21 February 1968) is a former South African rugby union player, who played at lock.

== Playing career ==
Hattingh played Craven Week rugby for Western Transvaal in 1985. He made his provincial debut for Northern Transvaal in 1991 and his international debut for the Springboks on 22 August 1992 against Australia at Newlands in Cape Town, when he replaced Adri Geldenhuys in the first half. Hattingh played in five test matches and twelve tour matches for the Springboks, scoring four tries in tour matches.

=== Test history ===
No.	Opponents	Results(RSA 1st)	Position	Tries	Dates	Venue
1.	Australia	3–26	Replacement		22 August 1992	Newlands, Cape Town
2.	France	16–29	Replacement		24 October 1992	Parc des Princes, Paris
3.	England	16–33	Lock		14 November 1992	Twickenham, London
4.	Argentina	42–22	Lock		8 October 1994	Boet Erasmus, Port Elizabeth
5.	Argentina	46–26	Lock		15 October 1994	Ellis Park, Johannesburg

== See also ==
- List of South Africa national rugby union players – Springbok no. 568
