= Adriaan Richter =

South African rugby union footballer

- Born: Adrianus Hendrikus Richter; 10 May 1966 (age 60) Roodepoort, Gauteng
- Height: 1.96 m (6 ft 5 in)
- Weight: 100 kg (220 lb)
- School: Roodepoort High School
- University: Rand Afrikaans University

Rugby union career
Provincial / State sides
Years	Team	Apps	(Points)
1988	Transvaal	27	
	Northern Transvaal	137	
Super Rugby
Years	Team	Apps	(Points)
1996–1998	Bulls	31	(40)
International career
Years	Team	Apps	(Points)
1992–1995	South Africa	10	(20)

Adrianus Hendrikus 'Adriaan' Richter (born 10 May 1966), is a former South African rugby union player who played for the South Africa national rugby union team between 1992 and 1995.

== Career ==
=== Province ===
Richter made his provincial debut for Transvaal in 1988. He moved to Northern Transvaal (later renamed the Blue Bulls) and played 137 matches for the union, captaining the team 80 times.

=== National team ===
He played his first test match for the Springboks on 17 October 1992 against France at the Stade de Gerland in Lyon. He was a member of the South African squad that won the 1995 Rugby World Cup, captaining the Springboks in their victory over Romania, during the pool matches. His last test match was on 10 June 1995 against Samoa, during the 1995 World Cup quarter-finals at Ellis Park in Johannesburg. Richter also played in nineteen tour matches, scoring seven tries for the Springboks.

=== Test history ===
No.	Opposition	Result (SA 1st)	Position	Tries	Date	Venue
1.	France	20–15	Flank		17 October 1992	Stade de Gerland, Lyon
2.	France	16–29	Flank		24 October 1992	Parc des Princes, Paris
3.	England	16–33	Number 8		14 November 1992	Twickenham, London
4.	England	27–9	Number 8		11 June 1994	Newlands, Cape Town
5.	New Zealand	14–22	Number 8		9 July 1994	Carisbrook, Dunedin
6.	New Zealand	9–13	Number 8		23 July 1994	Athletic Park, Wellington
7.	New Zealand	18–18	Number 8		6 August 1994	Eden Park, Auckland
8.	Romania	21–8	Number 8 (c)	2	30 May 1995	Newlands, Cape Town
9.	Canada	20–0	Number 8	2	3 June 1995	Boet Erasmus, Port Elizabeth
10.	Samoa	42–14	Replacement		10 June 1995	Ellis Park, Johannesburg

== See also ==
- List of South Africa national rugby union players – Springbok no. 580

Sporting positions
Preceded by Tiaan Strauss	Springbok Captain; 1995	Succeeded by Gary Teichmann
