= Rod McCall =

Australia international rugby union player

- Born: Roderick James McCall; 20 September 1963 (age 63) Brisbane, Australia

Rugby union career
Provincial / State sides
Years	Team	Apps	(Points)
- Queensland Reds
International career
Years	Team	Apps	(Points)
1989–1995	Australia	40	(5)

Roderick James McCall (born 20 September 1963, in Brisbane) is a former Australian rugby union lock. McCall played for Australia from 1989 to 1995, including winning the 1991 Rugby World Cup. He played 40 times in total for Australia. He played 107 times for the Queensland Reds.

McCall made his début for Australia at age 25 on 4 November 1989 in a game against the French, the game was won by Australia, 32 points to 15 in Strasbourg. McCall played in all of Australia's matches at the 1991 World Cup, and after winning all of their pool games and then defeating the All Blacks in the semi-finals, Australia won the World Cup against England in the final.

He played his final two tests in Australia against Argentina, winning both games in Sydney and Brisbane, before heading over to South Africa for the 1995 Rugby World Cup. Although losing to the Springboks and England, Australia won their game against Romania. McCall captained the Wallabies in that match, his final international match for Australia and his sole honour as captain.

He played in the Queensland Reds' first ever Super 12 game in 1996 against the Otago Highlanders on 3 March. He retired in that 1996 season aged 31.

Preceded by Phil Kearns	Australian national rugby union captain 1995	Succeeded by John Eales
