= Pieter Muller =

South African rugby union footballer

- Born: Pieter Gysbert Muller; 5 May 1969 (age 57) Bloemfontein, Free State, South Africa
- Height: 1.87 m (6 ft 2 in)
- Weight: 100 kg (220 lb)
- School: Grey College, Bloemfontein
- Notable relative: Helgard Muller (brother)

Rugby union career
- Position: Centre
Amateur team(s)
Years	Team	Apps	(Points)
1992–1995	College Rovers		
Senior career
Years	Team	Apps	(Points)
→1996–1997	Toulouse, France		
2000–2004	Cardiff Blues	80	
Provincial / State sides
Years	Team	Apps	(Points)
1990–1991	Free State	27	
1992–1995	Natal		
1997–1999	Natal/Sharks	64	
International career
Years	Team	Apps	(Points)
1992–1999	South Africa	33	(15)

Pieter Gysbert Muller (born 5 May 1969) is a South Africa former international rugby union player. A centre, he was known for his strength and direct running.

== Rugby union career ==
As a schoolboy, Muller represented Free State at the Craven Week tournaments in 1987 and 1988 and on both occasions were selected for the SA Schools team. He made his provincial debut for Free State in 1990, after spending some time playing club rugby in Ireland for Greystones R.F.C. In 1992, Muller joined Natal and was a member of the Currie Cup winning team in 1992. He suffered a serious neck injury early in 1995 that required time away from rugby, after which he tried rugby league and spent time in France playing for Toulouse. In 1997, Muller returned to the Sharks and in 2000 he joined Cardiff Blues in Wales.

His first test match for the Springboks was in 1992 against the All Blacks at Ellis Park in Johannesburg and he scored a try on debut. Muller played 33 test matches for the Springboks and was a member of the 1999 World Cup squad. His last test match for South Africa was the third place playoff at the 1999 World Cup against New Zealand at the Millennium Stadium in Cardiff. Muller also played in 19 tour matches for the Springboks and scored 7 tries.

=== Test history ===
No.	Opposition	Result (SA 1st)	Position	Tries	Date	Venue
1.	New Zealand	24–27	Centre	1	15 August 1992	Ellis Park, Johannesburg
2.	Australia	3–26	Centre		22 August 1992	Newlands, Cape Town
3.	France	20–15	Centre		17 October 1992	Stade de Gerland, Lyon
4.	France	16–29	Centre		24 October 1992	Parc des Princes, Paris
5.	England	16–33	Centre		14 November 1992	Twickenham, London
6.	France	20–20	Centre		26 June 1993	Kings Park, Durban
7.	France	17–18	Centre		3 July 1993	Ellis Park, Johannesburg
8.	Australia	19–12	Centre	1	31 July 1993	Sydney Football Stadium (SFG), Sydney
9.	Australia	20–28	Centre		14 August 1993	Ballymore Stadium, Brisbane
10.	Australia	12–19	Centre		21 August 1993	Sydney Football Stadium (SFG), Sydney
11.	Argentina	29–26	Centre		6 November 1993	Ferrocarril Oeste Stadium, Buenos Aires
12.	Argentina	52–23	Centre		13 November 1993	Ferrocarril Oeste Stadium, Buenos Aires
13.	England	15–32	Centre		4 June 1994	Loftus Versfeld, Pretoria
14.	England	27–9	Centre		11 June 1994	Newlands, Cape Town
15.	New Zealand	14–22	Centre		9 July 1994	Carisbrook, Dunedin
16.	Scotland	34–10	Centre		19 November 1994	Murrayfield, Edinburgh
17.	Wales	20–12	Centre		26 November 1994	Cardiff Arms Park, Cardiff
18.	Ireland	37–13	Centre		13 June 1998	Free State Stadium, Bloemfontein
19.	Ireland	33–0	Centre		20 June 1998	Loftus Versfeld, Pretoria
20.	Wales	96–13	Centre		27 June 1998	Loftus Versfeld, Pretoria
21.	England	18–0	Centre		4 July 1998	Newlands, Cape Town
22.	Australia	14–13	Centre		18 July 1998	Subiaco Oval, Perth
23.	New Zealand	13–3	Centre		25 July 1998	Athletic Park, Wellington
24.	New Zealand	24–23	Centre		15 August 1998	Kings Park, Durban
25.	Australia	29–15	Centre		29 August 1998	Ellis Park, Johannesburg
26.	Italy	74–3	Centre		12 June 1999	Boet Erasmus, Port Elizabeth
27.	Wales	19–29	Centre		26 June 1998	Millennium Stadium, Cardiff
28.	New Zealand	0–28	Centre		10 July 1999	Carisbrook, Dunedin
29.	Australia	6–32	Centre		17 July 1999	Suncorp Stadium, Brisbane
30.	Spain	47–3	Centre	1	10 October 1999	Murrayfield, Edinburgh
31.	England	44–21	Centre		24 October 1999	Stade De France, Paris
32.	Australia	21–27	Centre		30 October 1999	Twickenham, London
33.	New Zealand	22–18	Centre		4 November 1999	Millennium Stadium, Cardiff

== Rugby league ==
In 1996, Muller also had an unsuccessful stint playing for Australian rugby league side Penrith Panthers, in the Winfield Cup, making only a handful of appearances in the two years of his contract. Muller then returned to South Africa and club rugby before once again representing the Springboks.

== Accolades ==
Muller was voted as one of the five Young Players of the Year for 1991, along with Hennie le Roux, Pieter Hendriks, Johan Nel and Jacques Olivier.

== Personal ==
He is the brother of Helgard Muller, also former Springboks rugby player. Muller resides in Cape Town (Hout Bay) and is closely involved with the SA Rugby Legends.

== See also ==
- List of South Africa national rugby union players – Springbok no. 560
- List of South Africa national under-18 rugby union team players
