= Anthony Herbert (rugby) =

Australian rugby footballer (born 1966)

Personal information
- Born: 13 August 1966 (age 59) Australia

Playing information

Rugby union
Representative
Years	Team	Pld	T	G	FG	P
1987–1993	Australia	10	1	0	0	5

Rugby league
- Position: Fullback
Club
Years	Team	Pld	T	G	FG	P
1995	South Queensland Crushers	2	0	0	0	0

Anthony Herbert (born 13 August 1966) is a former Australian rugby footballer. He represented the Wallabies on a number of occasions during the late 1980s and early 1990s. He was also a part of the Australian squad that won the 1991 Rugby World Cup in England.

== Early years ==
Herbert attended Marist College Ashgrove.

His brother Daniel was also an Australian rugby union representative player.

== Rugby union career ==
Herbert made his debut for the Wallabies on 17 May 1987 in a match against Korea. He came off the bench as a replacement, and the Wallabies eventually won the match, 65 points to 18, at Ballymore in Brisbane. He was also in the squad to play Ireland in June but was not used off the bench, but did earn another cap against France on 13 June.

He next played for the Wallabies in June 1990, as a replacement against France. He got his first match in the starting lineup against the USA, which Australia won 67–9. Herbert then played two tests against the All Blacks for the Bledisloe Cup; Australia lost the first 17–27 at Eden Park in Auckland, but won the second 9-21 at Athletic Park in Wellington.

Herbert was included in Australia's Rugby World Cup squad for the second tournament, taking place in England in 1991. He started in the match against Samoa in Pontypool, which the Wallabes won 9–3. Australia eventually won the World Cup.

He next played for the Wallabies in a Bledisloe Cup match against the All Blacks in Sydney in 1992. Australia lost 23–26, though Herbert scored one of the Wallabies' two tries. He also played in the 1993 Bledisloe match at Carisbrook, Dunedin, which the Wallabies lost 25–10. His last match for the Wallabies was the 28–20 victory over South Africa in 1993 at Ballymore, Brisbane.

== Rugby league career ==
Herbert played two matches for the new South Queensland Crushers franchise in 1995.
