= Lood Muller =

South Africa international rugby union player

- Born: Lodewyk Joseph Jurgens Muller; 5 July 1959 Pietermaritzburg, KwaZulu-Natal
- Died: 24 May 2018 (aged 58) Dundee, KwaZulu-Natal
- Height: 1.82 m (6 ft 0 in)
- Weight: 110 kg (243 lb)
- School: Voortrekker High School, Pietermaritzburg

Rugby union career
Provincial / State sides
Years	Team	Apps	(Points)
1989–1994	Sharks	90	(9)
International career
Years	Team	Apps	(Points)
1992	South Africa	2	

Lodewyk Joseph Jurgens 'Lood' Muller (5 July 1959 – 24 May 2018) was a South African rugby union player, who played tighthead prop.

== Playing career ==
Muller played his provincial rugby for Natal and was almost thirty years old when he made his debut for Natal in 1989. In 1990 he suffered a neck injury and missed out on Natal's first Currie Cup title in 1990, but he was a member of the Natal team that won the Currie Cup in 1992.

Muller made his test debut for the Springboks in 1992 against New Zealand at Ellis Park in Johannesburg.

=== Test history ===
No.	Opponents	Results (RSA 1st)	Position	Points	Dates	Venue
1.	New Zealand	24–27	Tighthead prop		15 August 1992	Ellis Park, Johannesburg
2.	Australia	3–26	Tighthead prop		22 August 1992	Newlands, Cape Town

== See also ==
- List of South Africa national rugby union players – Springbok no. 563
