= Peter Slattery =

- Born: Peter John Slattery; 6 June 1965 (age 61) Brisbane

Rugby union career
Senior career
Years	Team	Apps	(Points)
	University	108	
Provincial / State sides
Years	Team	Apps	(Points)
1985 -	Queensland Reds	109	
International career
Years	Team	Apps	(Points)
1990 - 1995	Australia	17	(8)

Peter John Slattery was an Australian rugby union player playing in the position of scrum-half. He was born 6 June 1965 in Brisbane, Queensland, Australia and attended Brisbane State High School.

Peter Slattery played 17 Tests for Australia in a six-year international career.
