= Pieter Hendriks =

South African rugby union footballer

- Born: Pieter Hendriks; 13 April 1970 (age 56) Douglas, Northern Cape
- Height: 1.82 m (6 ft 0 in)
- Weight: 86 kg (190 lb)
- School: Standerton High School

Rugby union career
Amateur team(s)
| Years | Team | Apps | (Points) |
- Technikon
Provincial / State sides
| Years | Team | Apps | (Points) |
| 1990–1997 | Transvaal | 137 | (423) |
International career
| Years | Team | Apps | (Points) |
| 1992–1996 | South Africa | 14 | (10) |

Pieter Hendriks (born 13 April 1970), is a former South African rugby union player who played for the South Africa national rugby union team between 1992 and 1996.

== Playing career ==
Hendriks represented the South Eastern Transvaal Schools team at the annual Craven Week tournament in 1988 and was also selected for the SA Schools team. He made his senior provincial debut for Transvaal in 1990 and was a member of the Transvaal team that won the Currie Cup in 1993 and 1994. Hendriks scored 38 Currie Cup tries and 89 tries in all matches for Transvaal.

Hendriks made his test debut for the Springboks against New Zealand on 15 Augustus 1992 at Ellis Park in Johannesburg. He was part of the South African squad that won the 1995 Rugby World Cup. Hendriks scored the opening try for South Africa in the opening game of the 1995 Rugby World Cup against Australia but was later banned for 90 days for kicking and punching in a mass brawl in the game against Canada. His last test match was against New Zealand in the 1996 test series that was lost by South Africa. He also played in nine tour matches, scoring four tries for the Springboks.

=== Test history ===
| No. | Opposition | Result (SA 1st) | Position | Tries | Date | Venue |
|---|---|---|---|---|---|---|
| 1. | New Zealand | 24–27 | Wing | | 15 August 1992 | Ellis Park, Johannesburg |
| 2. | Australia | 3–26 | Wing | | 22 August 1992 | Newlands, Cape Town |
| 3. | Scotland | 34–10 | Wing | | 19 November 1994 | Murrayfield, Edinburgh |
| 4. | Wales | 20–12 | Wing | | 26 November 1994 | Cardiff Arms Park, Cardiff |
| 5. | Australia | 27–18 | Wing | 1 | 25 May 1995 | Newlands, Cape Town |
| 6. | Romania | 21–8 | Wing | | 30 May 1995 | Newlands, Cape Town |
| 7. | Canada | 20–0 | Wing | | 3 June 1995 | Boet Erasmus, Port Elizabeth |
| 8. | Australia | 16–21 | Wing | 1 | 13 July 1996 | Sydney Football Stadium, Sydney |
| 9. | New Zealand | 11–15 | Wing | | 20 July 1996 | AMI Stadium, Christchurch |
| 10. | Australia | 25–19 | Wing | | 3 August 1996 | Free State Stadium, Bloemfontein |
| 11. | New Zealand | 18–29 | Wing | | 10 August 1996 | Newlands, Cape Town |
| 12. | New Zealand | 19–23 | Wing | | 17 August 1996 | Kings Park Stadium, Durban |
| 13. | New Zealand | 26–33 | Wing | | 24 August 1996 | Loftus Versfeld, Pretoria |
| 14. | New Zealand | 32–22 | Wing | | 31 August 1996 | Ellis Park, Johannesburg |

== Accolades ==
Hendriks was voted as one of the five Young Players of the Year for 1991, along with Hennie le Roux, Pieter Muller, Johan Nel and Jacques Olivier.

== See also ==
- List of South Africa national rugby union players – Springbok no. 559
- List of South Africa national under-18 rugby union team players
