= Tim Gavin =

Australia international rugby union player (born 1963)

Tim Bryant Gavin
- Born: Bryant Timothy Gavin; 20 November 1963 (age 62) Cumnock, New South Wales, Australia
- Height: 1.98 m (6 ft 6 in)
- Weight: 106 kg (16 st 10 lb)
- Occupation(s): Professional rugby union footballer, farmer

Rugby union career
- Position: Number 8
Amateur team(s)
Years	Team	Apps	(Points)
1992-95	Milan		
Provincial / State sides
Years	Team	Apps	(Points)
1988-96	Waratahs		
- Correct as of 7 July 2011
Super Rugby
Years	Team	Apps	(Points)
1988	NSW Waratahs	63	
International career
Years	Team	Apps	(Points)
1988-96	Australia	47	(40)

Bryant Timothy Gavin (born Sydney 20 November 1963) is an Australian former state and national representative rugby union player who played Number 8 for the Wallabies in 47 Test matches in between 1988 and 1996.

Gavin played 83 times for New South Wales between 1988 and 1996 and captained them 30 times. He also played for Milan in Italy in the Australian off seasons between 1992 and 1995. He missed the 1991 Rugby World Cup victory as he suffered a knee injury just before the tournament but played in the 1995 tournament and the inaugural Tri-Nations Series

== Later life ==
Since retiring from rugby, he has farmed land outside Gunnedah, New South Wales. and been President of the New South Wales Rugby Union.

Gavin was inducted into the Australian Rugby Hall of Fame in 2018.

== Sources ==
- Tim Gavin at ESPNscrum (archived)
- Fox Sports Interview
- it:Tim Gavin - Wikipedia Italian
