= Harry Roberts (rugby union, born 1960) =

South African rugby union footballer

- Born: Harry Roberts; 3 December 1960 (age 65) Lusaka, Northern Rhodesia
- Height: 1.75 m (5 ft 9 in)
- Weight: 95 kg (209 lb)
- School: Marandellas High School, Rhodesia
- University: University of the Witwatersrand

Rugby union career
- Position: Hooker
Amateur team(s)
Years	Team	Apps	(Points)
1987–89	Leicester		
1990-91	London Scottish		
Provincial / State sides
Years	Team	Apps	(Points)
1985–86, 90–94	Transvaal	95	
1994	Eastern Province	4	
-	Scottish Exiles		
International career
Years	Team	Apps	(Points)
1990	Scotland 'B'	1	(0)
1992	South Africa		

Harry Roberts (born 13 December 1960 in Lusaka, Northern Rhodesia) is a former South African rugby union player. He was qualified to play for both South Africa and Scotland.

== Rugby Union career ==
=== Amateur career ===
In 1987, Roberts moved to Leicester and spent a couple of years at the club.

The following season he played for London Scottish.

=== Provincial career ===
Roberts made his debut for Transvaal in 1985 and played 16 matches for Transvaal in 1985 and 1986., after which he returned to Transvaal and played a further 79 matches for the union. He was a member of the Transvaal teams that lost in the Currie Cup finals of 1991 and 1992.

He played for the Scottish Exiles in the Scottish Inter-District Championship.

=== International career ===
He was capped by Scotland 'B' to play against Ireland 'B' on 22 December 1990.

Roberts toured with the Springboks to France and England in 1992. He did not play in any test matches on tour, but played in six tour matches and scored one try for the Springboks.

== See also ==
- List of South Africa national rugby union players – Springbok no. 573
