= Heinrich Füls =

South African rugby union footballer

- Born: Heinrich Theodor Füls; 8 March 1971 (age 55) Hoopstad, Free State
- Height: 1.88 m (6 ft 2 in)
- Weight: 90 kg (198 lb)
- School: Grey College, Bloemfontein
- University: Rand Afrikaans University

Rugby union career
- Position: Centre
Amateur team(s)
Years	Team	Apps	(Points)
- RAU
–	Crusader–Technikon		
–	Parow NTC		
–	Hamiltons		
Provincial / State sides
Years	Team	Apps	(Points)
1992	Transvaal	16	
1993–94	Eastern Province	11	
1994	Western Province	3	
1998	Border Bulldogs	8	
International career
Years	Team	Apps	(Points)
1992–93	South Africa	8	

Heinrich Theodor Füls (born 8 March 1971) is a South African former rugby union player.

== Playing career ==
Füls made his provincial debut for Transvaal in 1992. He also played for Eastern Province, Western Province and the Border Bulldogs in the South African domestic competitions.

He made his test debut for South Africa as a replacement for James Small after 38 minutes in the second half in the test against the New Zealand on 15 August 1992 at Ellis Park in Johannesburg. Füls was capped eight times in test matches for the Springboks and also played a further 13 tour matches in which he scored one try for the Springboks.

== See also ==
- List of South Africa national rugby union players – Springbok no. 567
