= Adolf Malan =

South African rugby union footballer

- Born: Adolf Weich Malan; 6 September 1961 (age 65) Germiston, Gauteng
- Height: 2.04 m (6 ft 8 in)
- Weight: 110 kg (243 lb)
- School: Hoërskool Pietersburg, Polokwane, Limpopo
- University: University of Pretoria

Rugby union career
- Position: Lock
Amateur team(s)
Years	Team	Apps	(Points)
- University of Pretoria
–	Harlequins		
Provincial / State sides
Years	Team	Apps	(Points)
1983–1993	Northern Transvaal	159	
International career
Years	Team	Apps	(Points)
1989–1992	South Africa	7	

Adolf Weich Malan (born 6 September 1961) is a former South African rugby union player. He played 159 matches for Northern Transvaal. His usual position was as lock, where he also played for the national team, the Springboks.

== Playing career ==
Malan made his debut for South Africa on 26 August 1989 against a World XV team. The match was played at Newlands in Cape Town, and Malan started at lock, with the Springboks winning 20 to 19. He played in the subsequent test against the World XV, which was won 22 to 16 at Ellis Park.

Malan next played for the Springboks in 1992, when he earned five international caps for South Africa, the first of which was against the All Blacks at Ellis Park, which the Springboks lost 24 to 27, as well as the following test against Australia. He then played in two tests against France in France, winning one and losing one. Malan's last test was on 14 November 1992 against England. Malan was known as a strong ball winner in the line–out.

=== Test history ===
No.	Opponents	Results(RSA 1st)	Position	Tries	Dates	Venue
1.	World XV	20–19	Lock		26 Aug 1989	Newlands, Cape Town
2.	World XV	22–16	Lock		2 Sep 1989	Ellis Park, Johannesburg
3.	New Zealand	24–27	Lock		15 August 1992	Ellis Park, Johannesburg
4.	Australia	3–26	Lock		22 August 1992	Newlands, Cape Town
5.	France	20–15	Lock		17 October 1992	Stade de Gerland, Lyon
6.	France	16–29	Lock		24 October 1992	Parc des Princes, Paris
7.	England	16–33	Lock		14 November 1992	Twickenham, London

== Accolades ==
In 2000 he was inducted into the University of Pretoria Hall of fame.

== Trivia ==
Malan and his lock partner against the World XV, Niel Hugo had the honour of being the tallest Springbok players at 2.04m. In 2008 Andries Bekker became the tallest Springbok, at 2.08m.

== See also ==
- List of South Africa national rugby union players – Springbok no. 556
