= Gert Smal =

South African former rugby union player and coach

- Born: Gert Petrus Smal; 27 December 1961 (age 64) Kimberley, South Africa
- Height: 1.98 m (6 ft 6 in)
- Weight: 120 kg (18 st 13 lb)
- School: Hoërskool Kroonstad

Rugby union career
- Position: Flanker
Senior career
Years	Team	Apps	(Points)
1980–1983	Western Transvaal		
1984–1985	Maties		
1986–1990	Rugby Rovigo		
Provincial / State sides
Years	Team	Apps	(Points)
1984–1993	Western Province		
International career
Years	Team	Apps	(Points)
1984	SA Gazelles		
1986	Junior Springboks		
1986–1987	SA Defence Force		
1986–1989	South Africa	6	(4)
- Correct as of 31 July 2019
Coaching career
- Years: Team
- 1998–1999: Border Bulldogs
- 2000–2002: Western Province
- 2003–2005: Stormers
- 2004–2007: South Africa
- 2008–2013: Ireland
- 2014–2018: Western Province
- 2019-present: Toyota Verblitz
- Correct as of 31 July 2019

Gert Petrus Smal (born 27 December 1961) is a South African former rugby union player who also served as an assistant coach for South Africa and Ireland. He is currently the forwards coach for Toyota Verblitz in Japan.

== Playing career ==
=== Club career ===
Gert Smal was a flanker with Western Transvaal from 1980 to 1983 then played with Stellenbosch University from 1984 to 1985. After the appointment of former Springboks coach Nelie Smith for the Italian club Rugby Rovigo, he moved there in 1986, soon becoming a key element for the achievement of two national titles (1988 and 1990), alongside fellow South Africans Naas Botha and Tito Lupini. During his time in Italy, he also helped Rugby Rovigo reach another final (1989). The Smith-Lupini-Botha-Smal era is still fondly remembered in Rovigo, the most rugby addicted city in Italy, for the impact it had in ending a 9 years winning drought for the team.

=== Provincial/International career ===
Smal had a limited international playing career due to the international boycott of South African sports teams because of the apartheid regime which ended in 1992. He captained South African Gazelles (U24 side) in 1984. He turned out for the Springboks against the touring New Zealand Cavaliers in 1986, against a World Invitation XV in 1989 and a Serge Blanco World XV team against France.

He also represented Western Province between 1984 and 1993 and the South African Defence Forces in 1986 and 1987.

==== Retirement from playing ====
On the Australasian tour with Western Province in 1993, during a match against Queensland, Smal received a blow in the mouth causing him to lose vision in the bottom corner of his left eye forcing his retirement from playing.

== Coaching career ==
Following the end of his playing career, he was appointed to a number of key coaching positions in South Africa and held coaching positions at the Border Bulldogs (1998–99), Western Province (2000–02) when they twice won the Currie Cup and then with the Stormers in the Super 12 between 2003 and 2005, reaching the semi-finals in 2004.

In 2004, Smal was appointed to the South African team management as assistant coach to Jake White, during which time the Springboks won the Tri-Nations championship in 2004 before winning the 2007 Rugby World Cup. When Jake White was replaced by Peter de Villiers as head coach following the world cup in 2007, Smal offered to develop rugby in the Eastern Cape but was turned down by the South African Rugby Union

In June 2008, Smal was appointed forwards coach to the Irish National team under Declan Kidney. During Smal's time at Ireland, they won the 2009 Six Nations completing the Grand Slam for the first time in 61 years. His assistance was key in Ireland's victory over the 2007 World Champions and Tri Nations 2009 champions South Africa during the 2009 Autumn Internationals where he taught the Irish pack some Afrikaans so that they could read the opposition's line out calls.

In June 2011, he signed a contract extension with the IRFU.

Smal was forced to miss the remainder of the 2012 Six Nations Championship after an eye condition struck him. His temporary replacement was Munster forwards coach Anthony Foley.

Smal's contract with Ireland ended in 2013 after which he chose to return to South Africa. In 2014, Smal was appointed the Director of Rugby at Western Province. He then left Western Province in 2019 to join Jake White at Japanese club team Toyota Verblitz where he is currently the forwards coach. He accompanied the Zimbabwe national rugby union team as a technical assistant in their successful 2025 Rugby Africa Cup campaign held in Uganda which saw Zimbabwe qualify for the 2027 Rugby World Cup. He joined the coaching staff of the Fiji national rugby union team in 2026

== Achievements ==
- Currie Cup 1984, 85 & 86 with Western Province as player.
- Serie A1 Championship with Rugby Rovigo as player: 1988 and 1990.
- Currie Cup 2000 & 2001 with Western Province as head coach.
- Tri Nations 2004, with South Africa as assistant coach.
- 2007 Rugby World Cup with South Africa as assistant coach.
- 2009 Six Nations with Ireland as forward coach.
- Currie Cup 2014 & 2017 with Western Province as Director of Rugby.
- 2025 Rugby Africa Cup with Zimbabwe as an assistant coach.

== Personal life ==
He is married to Patti and they have two children, a son Dean and daughter Tamarin.

== See also ==
- List of South Africa national rugby union players – Springbok no. 546
