= Piet Pretorius (rugby union) =

South African rugby union footballer

- Born: Petrus Ingenas Lourens Pretorius; 17 August 1964 (age 62) Ellisras (now Lephalale), Limpopo
- Height: 1.92 m (6 ft 4 in)
- Weight: 102 kg (225 lb)
- School: Hoërskool Hans Strijdom, Mookgophong, Limpopo

Rugby union career
- Position: Flanker
Amateur team(s)
Years	Team	Apps	(Points)
- Pretoria RC
Provincial / State sides
Years	Team	Apps	(Points)
1989–1994	Northern Transvaal	64	
International career
Years	Team	Apps	(Points)
1992	South Africa		

Petrus Ingenas Lourens 'Piet' Pretorius (born 17 August 1964) is a former South African rugby union player.

== Playing career ==
Pretorius played his provincial rugby for Northern Transvaal and made his debut for the union on 1989. He was a member of the Northern Transvaal team that won the Currie Cup in 1991. Pretorius toured with the Springboks to France and England in 1992. He did not play in any test matches on tour, but played in six tour matches for the Springboks.

== See also ==
- List of South Africa national rugby union players – Springbok no. 577
