= Wahl Bartmann =

South African rugby union player

- Born: Wahl Justice Bartmann; 13 June 1963 (age 63) Florida, Gauteng
- Height: 1.88 m (6 ft 2 in)
- Weight: 105 kg (231 lb)
- School: Hoërskool Florida, Gauteng
- University: Rand Afrikaans University (Known as the University of Johannesburg)
- Occupation: CEO of Fidelity ADT

Rugby union career
- Position: Flanker
Provincial / State sides
Years	Team	Apps	(Points)
1982–1989	Transvaal	93	(72)
1990–1994	Natal	69	(94)
International career
Years	Team	Apps	(Points)
1986–1994	South Africa	8	

Wahl Justice Bartmann (born 13 June 1963) is a South African former rugby union player. After his rugby career, he became a businessman, initially working at a security firm his father founded. Bartmann is CEO of Fidelity ADT, South Africa's largest private security company.

== Playing career ==
Bartmann matriculated in 1981 and represented the South African Schools team in the same year. In 1982 Bartmann enrolled at the Rand Afrikaans University (RAU) (as of 2005, commonly known as the University of Johannesburg) in Johannesburg and made his debut for Transvaal as a nineteen year old. His two brothers, Leon and Francois, also represented Transvaal at provincial level. Bartmann also played for Natal and captained the team 45 times and was part of the team that won the Currie Cup in 1990 and 1992.

Bartmann made his test debut for the Springboks against the visiting New Zealand Cavaliers on 10 May 1986 at Newlands in Cape Town. In so doing, Bartmann became the first alumnus of RAU to receive Springbok colours for rugby. He toured with the Springboks to Argentina in 1993 and to New Zealand in 1994, but did not play in any test matches on these tours. He played eight tests without scoring any tries for the Springboks and also played in seven tour matches, scoring one try.

=== Test history ===
No.	Opponents	Results (RSA 1st)	Position	Tries	Dates	Venue
1.	New Zealand Cavaliers	21–15	Flanker		10 May 1986	Newlands, Cape Town
2.	New Zealand Cavaliers	18–19	Flanker		17 May 1986	Kings Park, Durban
3.	New Zealand Cavaliers	33–18	Flanker		24 May 1986	Loftus Versfeld, Pretoria
4.	New Zealand Cavaliers	24–10	Flanker		31 May 1986	Ellis Park, Johannesburg
5.	New Zealand	24–27	Flanker		15 August 1992	Ellis Park, Johannesburg
6.	Australia	3–26	Flanker		22 August 1992	Newlands, Cape Town
7.	France	20–15	Flanker		17 October 1992	Stade de Gerland, Lyon
8.	France	16–29	Flanker		24 October 1992	Parc des Princes, Paris

== Accolades ==
Bartmann was voted South Africa rugby player of the Year for two consecutive years, 1990 and 1991.

== Recent career ==
After his rugby career, Bartmann went on to join the security company his father founded, Springbok Patrols, as CEO. Bartmann grew the company into Southern Africa's largest integrated security solutions provider, and the company was renamed Fidelity Services Group.

In 2017, Bartmann decided that his company should acquire ADT Security South Africa from Tyco International, at a cost of R2 billion. The deal formed Fidelity ADT, which is South Africa's largest private security company.

== See also ==
- List of South Africa national rugby union players – Springbok no. 545
