= Garth Wright =

South Africa international rugby union player

- Born: Garth Derick Wright; 9 September 1963 (age 63) East London, Eastern Cape
- Height: 1.75 m (5 ft 9 in)
- Weight: 78 kg (172 lb)
- School: Muir College, Uitenhage, Eastern Cape
- University: University of Port Elizabeth

Rugby union career
- Position: Scrumhalf
Provincial / State sides
Years	Team	Apps	(Points)
1984–87, 93–94	Eastern Province	88	
1988–92	Transvaal	66	
International career
Years	Team	Apps	(Points)
1986–1992	South Africa	7	(4)

Garth Derick Wright (born 9 September 1963) is a former South African rugby union player.

== Playing career ==
Wright played for Eastern Province and Transvaal in the South African domestic competitions. He made his test debut for the Springboks in the third test against the visiting New Zealand Cavaliers team on 24 May 1986 at Loftus Versfeld in Pretoria. Wright scored his first and only test try in his second test, the fourth test against the Cavaliers. He was capped 7 times and scored 1 try for the Springboks and also played a further five tour matches.

=== Test history ===
No.	Opponents	Results (RSA 1st)	Position	Tries	Dates	Venue
1.	New Zealand Cavaliers	33–18	Scrumhalf		24 May 1986	Loftus Versfeld, Pretoria
2.	New Zealand Cavaliers	24–10	Scrumhalf	1	31 May 1986	Ellis Park, Johannesburg
3.	World XV	20–19	Scrumhalf		26 Aug 1989	Newlands, Cape Town
4.	World XV	22–16	Scrumhalf		2 Sep 1989	Ellis Park, Johannesburg
5.	France	20–15	Scrumhalf		17 Oct 1992	Stade de Gerland, Lyon
6.	France	16–29	Scrumhalf		24 Oct 1992	Parc des Princes, Paris
7.	England	16–33	Scrumhalf		14 Nov 1992	Twickenham, London

== See also ==
- List of South Africa national rugby union players – Springbok no. 548
