= John Williams (rugby union, born 1946) =

South African rugby union player (1946–2024)

- Born: Johannes Gerhardus Williams; 29 October 1946 Johannesburg, Transvaal, Union of South Africa
- Died: 5 December 2024 (aged 78)
- Height: 2.01 m (6 ft 7 in)
- Weight: 108 kg (238 lb)
- School: Hoërskool Piet Potgieter, Potgietersrus

Rugby union career
Provincial / State sides
Years	Team	Apps	(Points)
- Northern Transvaal
International career
Years	Team	Apps	(Points)
1971–1976	South Africa	13	
Coaching career
- Years: Team
- 1992: Springboks

Johannes Gerhardus "John" Williams (29 October 1946 – 5 December 2024) was a South African rugby union player and coach.

== Playing career ==
Williams played his senior provincial rugby in South Africa for Northern Transvaal. He made his test debut for the Springboks in 1971 against the touring French team on 12 June 1971 at the Free State Stadium in Bloemfontein. He also played test matches against Australia in 1971, England in 1972, the British Lions in 1974 and the 1976 All Blacks. He played in a further eleven tour matches, scoring one try for the Springboks.

=== Test history ===
No.	Opponents	Results (RSA 1st)	Position	Tries	Dates	Venue
1.	France	22–9	Lock		12 June 1971	Free State Stadium, Bloemfontein
2.	France	8–8	Lock		19 June 1971	Kings Park, Durban
3.	Australia	19–11	Lock		17 July 1971	Sydney Cricket Ground, Sydney
4.	Australia	14–6	Lock		31 July 1971	Brisbane Exhibition Ground, Brisbane
5.	Australia	18–6	Lock		7 August 1971	Sydney Cricket Ground, Sydney
6.	England	9–18	Lock		3 June 1972	Ellis Park, Johannesburg
7.	British Lions	3–12	Lock		8 June 1974	Newlands, Cape Town
8.	(British & Irish Lions) British Lions	9–28	Lock		22 June 1974	Loftus Versfeld, Pretoria
9.	(British & Irish Lions) British Lions	13–13	Lock		27 July 1974	Ellis Park, Johannesburg
10.	France	13–4	Lock		23 November 1974	Le stade de Toulouse, Toulouse
11.	France	10–8	Lock		30 November 1974	Parc des Princes, Paris
12.	New Zealand	16–7	Lock		24 July 1976	Kings Park, Durban
13.	New Zealand	9–15	Lock		14 August 1976	Free State Stadium, Bloemfontein

== Coaching career ==
Williams was the Northern Transvaal coach from 1987 to 1991 and coached his team to the Currie Cup final in each year. Northern Transvaal won three of the finals, in 1987, 1988 and 1991 and in 1989 they shared the title with Western Province. In 1992 Williams was appointed Springbok coach.

Williams was relieved of his duties after leading the team to one win in five games. He returned to coach the Bulls in the mid-1990s.

== Death ==
After being in a coma for 10 days, Williams died of leukemia on 5 December 2024. He was 78.

== See also ==
- List of South Africa national rugby union players – Springbok no. 450

Sporting positions
Preceded by (South Africa) Cecil Moss	South Africa National Rugby Union Coach; 1992	Succeeded by (South Africa) Ian McIntosh
