= Adri Geldenhuys =

South African rugby union footballer

- Born: Adrian Geldenhuys; 11 July 1964 (age 62) Clanwilliam, Western Cape
- Height: 1.98 m (6 ft 6 in)
- Weight: 108 kg (238 lb)
- School: PW Botha College, George, Western Cape

Rugby union career
- Position: Lock
Amateur team(s)
Years	Team	Apps	(Points)
- Pretoria Police
–	Despatch		
Provincial / State sides
Years	Team	Apps	(Points)
1987–1989	Northern Transvaal		
1990–1997	Eastern Province		
International career
Years	Team	Apps	(Points)
1992	South Africa	4	

Adrian Geldenhuys (born 11 July 1964) is a former South African rugby union player.

== Playing career ==
Geldenhuys made his provincial debut for Northern Transvaal in 1987. He had a very successful first provincial season with Northern Transvaal, winning the 1987 Currie Cup title and being nominated as one of the South African Players of the Year, the first player ever to be voted for this honour in his first year of first class rugby. In 1990, Geldenhuys relocated to the Eastern Cape and continued his career with Eastern Province. Geldenhuys made his test debut for South Africa on 15 August 1992 against the All Blacks at Ellis Park. He then played against Australia the following week and toured with the Springboks to France and England, playing in two tests against France, as well as seven tour matches.

=== Test history ===
No.	Opponents	Results(RSA 1st)	Position	Tries	Dates	Venue
1.	New Zealand	24–27	Lock		15 August 1992	Ellis Park, Johannesburg
2.	Australia	3–26	Lock		22 August 1992	Newlands, Cape Town
3.	France	20–15	Lock		17 October 1992	Stade de Gerland, Lyon
4.	France	16–29	Lock		24 October 1992	Parc des Princes, Paris

== See also ==
- List of South Africa national rugby union players – Springbok no. 564
