= Danie Gerber =

South African rugby union player

- Born: Daniël Mattheus Gerber; 14 April 1958 (age 68) Port Elizabeth, South Africa
- Height: 1.83 m (6 ft 0 in)
- Weight: 91 kg (201 lb)

Rugby union career
- Position: Centre
Provincial / State sides
Years	Team	Apps	(Points)
	Eastern Province	115	
-	Western Province	40	
-	Free State	24	
- Correct as of 2007-10-31
International career
Years	Team	Apps	(Points)
1980–1992	South Africa	24	(82)
- Correct as of 2007-10-31

Daniël Mattheus Gerber (born 14 April 1958) is a South African former rugby union player who played for South Africa between 1980 and 1992. Widely regarded as one of the greatest rugby players ever and considered by many as the greatest centre of all time, he played mainly at inside or outside centre, but also on the wing.

Gerber etched his name into rugby folklore by scoring 158 tries in 261 games in first-class rugby. It's the highest ever strike rate for a centre. For South Africa he scored 19 test tries in 24 appearances. It's the highest ever try-scoring ratio per game for a centre (79.16%) in the history of international rugby. Gerber was the blueprint of Springbok rugby in the 1980s and he is still regarded by many to be the greatest Springbok player ever. In 1981 he scored a brilliant individual try against Ireland; his agility and footwork caused 2 Irish players to tackle each other. In 1984 he scored 4 tries against England; 1 try in the first test and a hat-trick in the second test. In 1986 he played for the rest of the world XV against the 5 Nation's side at Twickenham. He scored 2 tries and got applauded by the whole stadium and the International Rugby Board members. In 1992 he scored 2 tries against New Zealand. Despite limited exposure internationally due to apartheid-era isolation, his impact on the game and talent was considered and still today, way ahead of his time.) He was inducted into the International Rugby Hall of Fame in 2007.

== Early life ==
Gerber initially played football and cricket at school level, but accelerated quickly when starting rugby, playing for SA schools. He said in multiple interviews that he got his incredible footwork and ball control abilities from his early childhood, when he played football with other kids in Despatch. One of his school teachers recognized his abilities and got him into rugby.

== Rugby career ==
In South African domestic rugby Gerber played 115 games for Eastern Province, 40 for Western Province and 24 for Orange Free State.

Gerber's international career of games played and points scored:

- In 1980, he played two tests against the South American Jaguars (a team mainly made up of Argentine players but also included a few Uruguayan, Chilean, Paraguayan and Brazilian players) in Montevideo and Santiago. He scored a try in each test. He also played one test against France in Pretoria without scoring any points, and one other test that year.
- In 1981, he played two tests against Ireland in Cape Town (scoring two tries) and in Durban without scoring points. He also went on the controversial 1981 Springbok Tour of New Zealand, playing in all three tests, (Christchurch, Wellington and Auckland) without scoring any points. He also played the final test of 1981 against the USA in Glenville, without scoring any points.
- In 1982, he played two tests against the South American Jaguars (again, mainly made up of Argentine players but also included a few Uruguayan, Chilean, Paraguayan and Brazilian players) scoring three tries in Pretoria and one in Bloemfontein.
- In 1984, he played two tests against England, scoring one try in his hometown, Port Elizabeth and three in Johannesburg. In this series, Gerber played outside South Africa's first ever Black player, Errol Tobias, in the series, and scored three tries in the second Test. Again the South American Jaguars toured South Africa and Gerber scored one try and one conversion in Pretoria and one try in Cape Town.
- In 1986, the New Zealand Cavaliers (a rebel tour conducted against the wishes of the NZ Rugby Union) toured South Africa, Gerber played in all four 'test' fixtures in Cape Town, Durban, Pretoria and Johannesburg and only managed one try in the Pretoria game.
- In 1992, after a long period of South African rugby isolation, Gerber played his final five test matches vs: New Zealand in Johannesburg scoring two tries, Australia in Cape Town without scoring any points, France in Lyon and Parc des Princes scoring one try in each match. His final test was against England in Twickenham which went without scoring any points.

=== Test history ===
No.	Opposition	Result (SA 1st)	Position	Points	Date	Venue
1.	South American Jaguars	22–13	Centre	4 (1 try)	18 October 1980	Wanderers Club, Montevideo
2.	South American Jaguars	30–16	Centre	4 (1 try)	25 October 1980	Prince of Wales Cricket Club, Santiago
3.	France	37–15	Centre		8 November 1980	Loftus Versfeld, Pretoria
4.	Ireland	23–15	Centre	8 (2 tries)	30 May 1981	Newlands, Cape Town
5.	Ireland	12–10	Centre		6 June 1981	Kings Park, Durban
6.	New Zealand	9–14	Centre		15 August 1981	Lancaster Park, Christchurch
7.	New Zealand	24–12	Centre		29 August 1981	Athletic Park, Wellington
8.	New Zealand	22–25	Centre		12 September 1981	Eden Park, Auckland
9.	United States	38–7	Centre		20 September 1981	Owl Creek Polo ground, Glenville, New York
10.	South American Jaguars	50–18	Centre	12 (3 tries)	27 March 1982	Loftus Versfeld, Pretoria
11.	South American Jaguars	12–21	Centre	4 (1 try)	3 April 1982	Free State Stadium, Bloemfontein
12.	England	33 - 15	Centre	4 (1 try)	2 June 1984	Boet Erasmus Stadium, Port Elizabeth
13.	England	35 - 9	Centre	12 (3 tries)	9 June 1984	Ellis Park, Johannesburg
14.	South American Jaguars	32–15	Centre	6 (1 try, 1 conv.)	20 October 1984	Loftus Versfeld, Pretoria
15.	South American Jaguars	21–13	Centre	4 (1 try)	27 October 1984	Newlands, Cape Town
16.	New Zealand Cavaliers	21–15	Centre		10 May 1986	Newlands, Cape Town
17.	New Zealand Cavaliers	18–19	Centre		17 May 1986	Kings Park, Durban
18.	New Zealand Cavaliers	33–18	Centre	4 (1 try)	24 May 1986	Loftus Versfeld, Pretoria
19.	New Zealand Cavaliers	24–10	Centre		31 May 1986	Ellis Park, Johannesburg
20.	New Zealand	24–27	Centre	10 (2 tries)	15 August 1992	Ellis Park, Johannesburg
21.	Australia	3–26	Centre		22 August 1992	Newlands, Cape Town
22.	France	20–15	Centre	5 (1 try)	17 October 1992	Stade de Gerland, Lyon
23.	France	16–29	Centre	5 (1 try)	24 October 1992	Parc des Princes, Paris
24.	England	16–33	Centre		14 November 1992	Twickenham, London

Gerber scored 19 tries in 24 internationals, a very high strike rate for a centre.

== Style of play ==
Gerber had high acceleration and pace, could sidestep off either foot, break tackles, had a clear vision of space on the field, and high ball skill levels (catching, passing and kicking). He was also very solid in defence.

Gerber attributed his sidestep to his early football. He trained extensively (particularly running, but also swimming, circuit training and weights) and had a high fitness level, which were unusual attributes before rugby went professional.

== Legacy ==
Gerber has been described as one of the greatest ever rugby players and considered by many as the greatest centre in the history of the game. Many former and current players admire Gerber's impact on the game and the legacy he left behind. Frank Bunce former All Blacks legend said: "He is in the conversation for being the greatest centre ever." Jean de Villiers former Springboks captain described Gerber as his childhood hero and the best player South Africa has ever produced. Former legendary Scottish commentator Bill McLaren regarded Gerber as the greatest centre the world has ever seen. He has been named South Africa's greatest ever centre, and Naas Botha has said he is one of the greatest ever South African rugby players. Martin Johnson named him in his International Rugby Hall of Fame member's XV, and Bill McLaren's named him in his 'all time' XV.

== Personal life ==
Gerber is married to Elsabe.

In 2002, he had heart surgery, and his family have a pattern of high cholesterol.

== See also ==
- List of South Africa national rugby union players – Springbok no. 514
- SA Rugby Player of the Year - 1984
