= 1986 Currie Cup =

Domestic rugby union competition

- Countries: South Africa
- Champions: Western Province (27th title)
- Runners-up: Transvaal

The 1986 Currie Cup was the 48th edition of the Currie Cup, the premier annual domestic rugby union competition in South Africa.

The tournament was won by Western Province for the 27th time; they beat Transvaal 22–9 in the final in Cape Town.

== Teams ==
The following teams took part in the 1986 Currie Cup:

1986 Currie Cup Division A
Eastern Province
Free State
Northern Free State
Northern Transvaal
Transvaal
Western Province

== Fixtures and Results ==
All result source:

=== Round One ===
03/05/1986	Eastern Province	6–6	Western Province

03/05/1986	Northern Transvaal	50–3	Northern Free State

=== Round Two ===
07/06/1986	Orange Free State	7–15	Northern Transvaal

07/06/1986	Western Province	13–16	Transvaal

=== Round Three ===
21/06/1986	Northern Free State	9–33	Orange Free State

21/06/1986	Northern Transvaal	27–31	Western Province

21/06/1986	Transvaal	23–16	Eastern Province

=== Round Four ===
05/07/1986	Eastern Province	18–28	Northern Transvaal

05/07/1986	Transvaal	27–15	Orange Free State

05/07/1986	Western Province	31–12	Northern Free State

=== Round Five ===
12/07/1986	Northern Free State	9–22	Eastern Province

12/07/1986	Northern Transvaal	19–19	Transvaal

12/07/1986	Orange Free State	13–34	Western Province

=== Round Six ===
19/07/1986	Eastern Province	29–27	Orange Free State

19/07/1986	Transvaal	23–15	Northern Free State

=== Round Seven ===
02/08/1986	Northern Free State	18–27	Northern Transvaal

02/08/1986	Orange Free State	6–22	Transvaal

02/08/1986	Western Province	39–24	Eastern Province

=== Round Eight ===
23/08/1986	Eastern Province	39–4	Northern Free State

23/08/1986	Northern Transvaal	19–13	Orange Free State

=== Round Nine ===
30/08/1986	Transvaal	12–20	Western Province

=== Round Ten ===
06/09/1986	Northern Free State	12–33	Transvaal

06/09/1986	Orange Free State	40–35	Eastern Province

06/09/1986	Western Province	26–16	Northern Transvaal

== Grand Final ==
27/09/1986	Western Province	22–9	Transvaal	Newlands Stadium, Cape Town

== See also ==
- Currie Cup
