= Naas Botha =

South African rugby union player

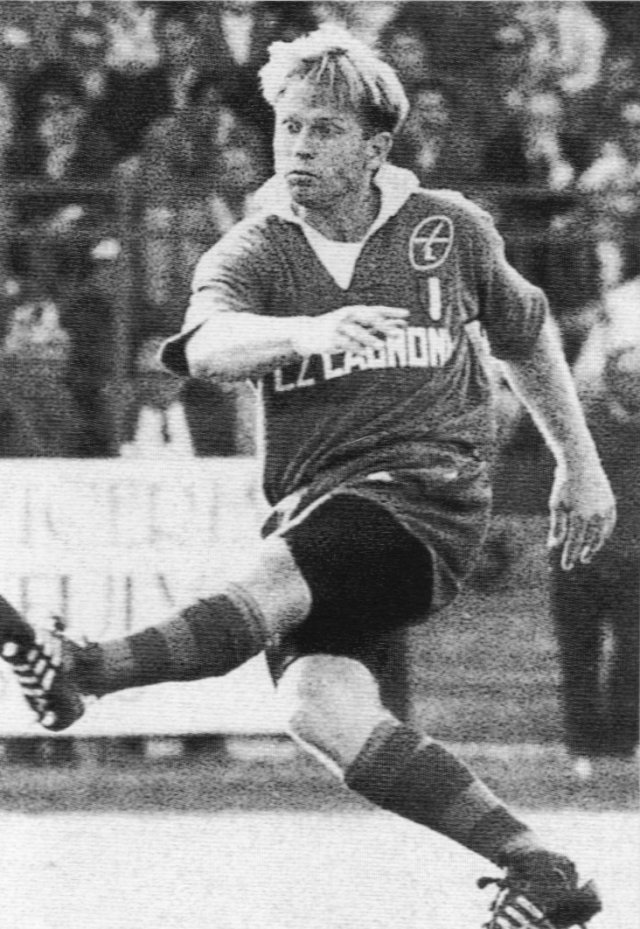
- Botha playing a game of rugby
- Born: Hendrik Egnatius Botha; 27 February 1958 (age 68) Breyten, Transvaal, South Africa
- School: Hoërskool Hendrik Verwoerd
- University: University of Pretoria

Rugby union career
- Position: Fly-half
Senior career
Years	Team	Apps	(Points)
1987–93	Rugby Rovigo	119	(1731)
- Correct as of 11 August 2014
Provincial / State sides
Years	Team	Apps	(Points)
1977–95	Northern Transvaal	179	(2511)
- Correct as of 11 August 2014
International career
Years	Team	Apps	(Points)
1980–92	South Africa	28	(312)
1986, 1992	World XV		
- Correct as of 11 August 2014

Hendrik Egnatius 'Naas' Botha (born 27 February 1958) is a South African former rugby union player who played as a Fly-half for Northern Transvaal, Rugby Rovigo and South Africa (the Springboks).

He was voted SA Rugby Player of the Year in 1979, 1981, 1985 and 1987. Botha mostly played in the fly-half position and is now a rugby commentator for the South African M-Net and Supersport TV channels. He was appointed the Director of Rugby at Hoërskool Eldoraigne in 2023.

== Family and early career ==
Botha was born in the town of Breyten in the Eastern Transvaal (now Mpumalanga), South Africa and went to school at the Hoërskool Hendrik Verwoerd in Pretoria. As a child, Botha aspired to playing professional baseball and applied for a sport scholarship in the United States. Botha was also an excellent schools cricket and tennis player and also a hurdles athlete.

However, Botha was selected to play for the South African under-20 rugby team, where he caught the eye of the selectors while still a student at the University of Pretoria.

As a result, Botha played his first Test for the Springboks on 26 April 1980 at the age of 22 in the flyhalf position against South America at Wanderers, Johannesburg.

== Rugby union ==
Botha was best known for extremely accurate (both left- and right-footed) kicking, which earned him the nickname "Nasty Booter" from the British press when the British Lions toured South Africa in 1980. He is best remembered for his abilities as a very successful drop-kicker in high pressure situations and is also considered to have had an outstanding tactical understanding of rugby.

While Botha was sometimes criticised for avoiding physical contact and not running with the ball, his handling of the ball was very deft and he could get his backline moving very quickly with accurate short- and long-range passing. As a result, he scored many tries and contributed to many more. However, some consider that he was somewhat weak in defence. Nevertheless, Danie Craven once said, "Give me Naas, and I'll conquer the world!"

Botha remained the highest points scorer in Springbok rugby history for a number of years, with a points total of 312. His tally was passed by Percy Montgomery on 17 July 2004. However, Montgomery passed him in his 50th match, while Botha had only played in 28.

In addition to his Springbok rugby-playing duties, Botha also played for the Northern Transvaal province (nicknamed the "Blou Bulle", which means "Blue Bulls", now their official name) from 1977 to 1995. During this period they won the Currie Cup nine times (sharing it twice with Western Province in 1979 and 1989). He was also captain of the province a record 128 times and scored a record 2,511 points (including 1,699 points in the Currie Cup).

== The 1981 tour and sporting bans ==
In 1980, Botha traveled with the Springboks to South America.

The 'boks beat France at Loftus Versveld in Pretoria; in 1981 they subsequently beat Ireland in their warm-up to their tour of New Zealand. Public opinion was deeply divided over the New Zealand tour. Botha and his fellow Springboks' focus on playing rugby was made difficult by actions such as pitch invasions and aircraft fly-bys from protesters opposed to South Africa's apartheid policies. South Africa lost the series 2-1, although the implications of the tour went far beyond rugby.

As an indirect result of this tour, South Africa was banned by the International Rugby Board from international competition until 1992. This meant that, apart from hosting the rebel New Zealand Cavaliers tour in 1986, Botha played few international games, including two tests in 1989 against a World 15 made up by players from England, Wales and France. Domestically he continued to excel: in 15 seasons playing for Northern Transvaal he played in 11 Currie Cup finals, winning nine (two shared) and scoring a record 2,511 points.

== International career ==
In the pre-professional era that Botha played in, being paid to play rugby was always a controversial subject. Despite being handsomely paid "under the table", Botha was of the opinion that he could earn more in professional sport, and was invited by the American football team the Dallas Cowboys in 1983 to travel to the United States to try out as a placekicker. While in the United States, Naas also played rugby with the Dallas Harlequins, where he helped them to the 1984 USA National Club Championships. The Dallas try-out was ultimately not successful, and he returned to South Africa to continue his rugby career.

In 1987, once again primarily for monetary considerations, Botha moved to the Italian club Rugby Rovigo, where he was coached by the former Springboks coach Nelie Smith and played alongside fellow South Africans Tito Lupini and Gert Smal. During the course of 6 seasons, Botha played 119 games for Rovigo and helped the team win two National Championships (in 1988 and 1990), ending a 9-years drought, also reaching the final twice (1989 and 1992), in addition to a semifinal (1991) and a quarter final (1993).

== Return to the Springboks ==
Botha's career lasted long enough for him to see South Africa let back into the international rugby fold and to play in one-off Tests against World Cup holders Australia and New Zealand. Both games ended in defeat. Botha then toured France with the Springboks, before bowing out, age 34, as flyhalf against England at Twickenham, London, in a 33–16 defeat on 14 November 1992.

Botha had set countless Springbok records during his rugby career and is still considered to be one of the Springbok "greats".

== Coaching and management career ==
In 2019, Botha was appointed coach of both the India men's national rugby union team and the India women's national rugby union team.

In 2026, Botha was appointed director of rugby at Kansas City Blues.

== Personal life ==
Botha is now married to Karen, a former Springbok athlete and long jump record-holder; the couple have three daughters, Kyla (1991) Gaeby (1998) and Lee-gre (2003).

== Career stats ==
=== Summary ===
Team	Matches	Won	Draw	Lost	Tries	Con	Pen	Drop	Points	P/M	%Won
South Africa – Test matches	28	19	0	9	2	50	50	18	312	11.14	67.86
South Africa – Tour matches	12	10	0	2	4	41	16	9	173	14.42	83.33

=== Test match record ===
No.	Opposition	Result (SA 1st)	Position	Points	Date	Venue
1.	South American Jaguars	24–9	Fly-half	12 (3 con, 1 pen, 1 drop)	26 Apr 1980	Wanderers Stadium, Johannesburg
2.	South American Jaguars	18–9	Fly-half	14 (1 con, 1 pen, 3 drop)	3 May 1980	Kings Park, Durban
3.	British Lions	26–22	Fly-half	6 (3 con)	31 May 1980	Newlands, Cape Town
4.	(British & Irish Lions) British Lions	26–19	Fly-half	10 (2 con, 2 pen)	14 Jun 1980	Free State Stadium, Bloemfontein
5.	(British & Irish Lions) British Lions	12–10	Fly-half	8 (1 con, 1 pen, 1 drop)	28 Jun 1980	Boet Erasmus Stadium, Port Elizabeth
6.	(British & Irish Lions) British Lions	13–17	Fly-half	3 (1 pen)	12 Jul 1980	Loftus Versfeld, Pretoria
7.	South American Jaguars	22–13	Fly-half	10 (2 con, 1 pen, 1 drop)	18 Oct 1980	Wanderers Club, Montevideo
8.	South American Jaguars	30–16	Fly-half	6 (3 con)	25 Oct 1980	Prince of Wales Country Club, Santiago
9.	France	37–15	Fly-half	17 (4 con, 3 pen)	8 Nov 1980	Loftus Versfeld, Pretoria
10.	Ireland	23–15	Fly-half	11 (1 con, 3 pen)	30 May 1981	Newlands, Cape Town
11.	Ireland	12–10	Fly-half	12 (1 pen, 3 drop)	6 Jun 1981	Kings Park, Durban
12.	New Zealand	9–14	Fly-half	5 (1 con, 1 drop)	15 Aug 1981	Lancaster Park, Christchurch
13.	New Zealand	24–12	Fly-half	20 (1 con, 5 pen, 1 drop)	29 Aug 1981	Athletic Park, Wellington
14.	New Zealand	22–25	Fly-half	10 (2 con, 2 pen)	12 Sep 1981	Eden Park, Auckland
15.	United States	38–7	Fly-half	6 (3 con)	20 Sep 1981	Owl Creek Polo ground, Glenville, New York
16.	South American Jaguars	50–18	Fly-half	15 (6 con, 1 drop)	27 Mar 1982	Loftus Versfeld, Pretoria
17.	South American Jaguars	12–21	Fly-half	8 (1 con, 2 pen)	3 Apr 1982	Free State Stadium, Bloemfontein
18.	New Zealand Cavaliers	21–15	Fly-half (c)	17 (1 con, 3 pen, 2 drop)	10 May 1986	Newlands, Cape Town
19.	New Zealand Cavaliers	18–19	Fly-half (c)	14 (1 con, 4 pen)	17 May 1986	Kings Park, Durban
20.	New Zealand Cavaliers	33–18	Fly-half (c)	21 (1 try, 4 con, 3 pen)	24 May 1986	Loftus Versfeld, Pretoria
21.	New Zealand Cavaliers	24–10	Fly-half (c)	17 (1 con, 5 pen)	31 May 1986	Ellis Park, Johannesburg
22.	World XV	20–19	Fly-half	12 (1 try, 1 con, 2 pen)	26 Aug 1989	Newlands, Cape Town
23.	World XV	22–16	Fly-half	14 (1 con, 3 pen, 1 drop)	2 Sep 1989	Ellis Park, Johannesburg
24.	New Zealand	24–27	Fly-half (c)	9 (3 con, 1 pen)	15 Aug 1992	Ellis Park, Johannesburg
25.	Australia	3–26	Fly-half (c)	3 (1 pen)	22 Aug 1992	Newlands, Cape Town
26.	France	20–15	Fly-half (c)	10 (2 con, 1 pen, 1 drop)	17 Oct 1992	Stade de Gerland, Lyon
27.	France	16–29	Fly-half (c)	11 (1 con, 2 pen, 1 drop)	24 Oct 1992	Parc des Princes, Paris
28.	England	16–33	Fly-half (c)	11 (1 con, 2 pen, 1 drop)	14 Nov 1992	Twickenham, London

Legend: pen = penalty (3 pts.); con = conversion (2 pts.), drop = drop kick (3 pts.).

== See also ==
- List of South Africa national rugby union players – Springbok no. 502

Sporting positions
Preceded by Divan Serfontein	Springbok Captain; 1986 and 1992	Succeeded by Jannie Breedt
