= Hennie le Roux =

South African rugby union footballer

- Born: Hendrik Pieter le Roux; 10 July 1967 (age 59) Grahamstown, Eastern Province
- Height: 1.75 m (5 ft 9 in)
- Weight: 80 kg (176 lb)
- School: Graeme College, Grahamstown University of Port Elizabeth
- University: Rand Afrikaans University

Rugby union career
Provincial / State sides
Years	Team	Apps	(Points)
1990–1991	Eastern Province	23	
1992–2000	Transvaal	153	
Super Rugby
Years	Team	Apps	(Points)
1998–2000	Cats	25	(41)
International career
Years	Team	Apps	(Points)
1993–1996	South Africa	27	(34)

Hendrik Pieter "Hennie" le Roux (born 10 July 1967), is a former South African rugby union player who played for the South Africa national rugby union team.

He was the founder and president of the players' union, which was founded in 1997 and received the contribution to rugby award in 2000.

== Career ==
=== Provincial ===
Le Roux represented the Eastern Province schools' team at the 1986 Craven Week tournament and in 1987 he played for the Eastern Province under–20 team. In 1990 he made his senior provincial debut for Eastern Province and in 1992 he moved to Transvaal. In 1996 he played Super Rugby for the Transvaal, when the South African provinces still participated and from 1998, he played for the Cats under the franchise structure.

=== International ===
He played his first test match for the Springboks on 26 June 1993 against France. His last test was on 15 December 1996 against Wales. He also played in 24 tour matches scoring 56 points for the Springboks.

==== Test history ====
World Cup final

No.	Opposition	Result (SA 1st)	Position	Points	Date	Venue
1.	France	20–20	Flyhalf		26 June 1993	Kings Park, Durban
2.	France	17–18	Flyhalf		3 July 1993	Ellis Park, Johannesburg
3.	England	15–32	Flyhalf		4 June 1994	Loftus Versfeld, Pretoria
4.	England	27–9	Flyhalf	14 (1 try, 3 pen)	11 June 1994	Newlands, Cape Town
5.	New Zealand	14–22	Flyhalf		9 July 1994	Carisbrook, Dunedin
6.	New Zealand	9–13	Flyhalf		23 July 1994	Athletic Park, Wellington
7.	New Zealand	18–18	Flyhalf		6 August 1994	Eden Park, Auckland
8.	Argentina	46–26	Centre		15 October 1994	Ellis Park, Johannesburg
9.	Scotland	34–10	Flyhalf		19 November 1994	Murrayfield, Edinburgh
10.	Wales	20–12	Flyhalf	5 (1 conv, 1 pen)	26 November 1994	Cardiff Arms Park, Cardiff
11.	Samoa	60–8	Centre		13 April 1995	Ellis Park, Johannesburg
12.	Australia	27–18	Centre		25 May 1995	Newlands, Cape Town
13.	Romania	21–8	Flyhalf		30 May 1995	Newlands, Cape Town
14.	Canada	20–0	Replacement		3 June 1995	Boet Erasmus Stadium, Port Elizabeth
15.	Samoa	42–14	Flyhalf		10 June 1995	Ellis Park, Johannesburg
16.	France	19–15	Centre		17 June 1995	Kings Park, Durban
17.	New Zealand	15–12	Centre		24 June 1995	Ellis Park, Johannesburg
18.	Wales	40–11	Centre		2 September 1995	Ellis Park, Johannesburg
19.	Italy	40–21	Centre	5 (1 try)	12 November 1995	Stadio Olimpico, Rome
20.	England	24–14	Centre		18 November 1995	Twickenham, London
21.	Fiji	43–18	Centre		2 July 1996	Loftus Versfeld, Pretoria
22.	New Zealand	18–29	Centre		10 August 1996	Newlands, Cape Town
23.	Argentina	46–15	Centre	5 (1 try)	9 November 1996	Ferro Carril Oeste Stadium, Buenos Aires
24.	Argentina	44–21	Centre	5 (1 try)	16 November 1996	Ferro Carril Oeste Stadium, Buenos Aires
25.	France	22–12	Centre		30 November 1996	Stade Chaban-Delmas, Bordeaux
26.	France	13–12	Centre		7 December 1996	Parc des Princes, Paris
27.	Wales	37–20	Centre		15 December 1996	Cardiff Arms Park, Cardiff

=== World Cup ===
- 1995 South Africa World Cup winners: 6 games (Wallabies, Romania, Canada, Samoa, France, All Blacks).

== See also ==
- List of South Africa national rugby union players – Springbok no. 572
