= M37 (Johannesburg) =

Metropolitan route in Greater Johannesburg, South Africa

Metropolitan route M37

Route information
- Maintained by Johannesburg Roads Agency and Department of Roads and Transport (Gauteng)
- Length: 24.8 km (15.4 mi)

Major junctions
- North end: N3 near Modderfontein
- R25 near Greenstone Hill M59 in Edenvale; M16 in Edenvale; R24 near Edenvale M99 near Edenvale; N12 near Edenvale M52 near Germiston M98 in Germiston; M14 in Germiston R29 / M57 in Germiston M53 in Germiston M49 in Germiston M53 in Germiston M93 in Germiston; N17 near Germiston M94 near Germiston; R554 / R103 near Germiston
- South end: Kgotso Road at Tsongweni, Katlehong

Location
- Country: South Africa

Highway system
- Numbered routes of South Africa
← M36	→ M38

The M37 is a metropolitan route in Greater Johannesburg, South Africa. It connects the N3 at Greenstone Shopping Mall with Katlehong via Edenvale and Germiston.

== Route ==
The M37 begins at Longmeadow Business Estate west of Modderfontein as an off-ramp of the N3 highway (Johannesburg Eastern Bypass). It begins by going southwards to meet the R25 road (Modderfontein Road) and bypass the Greenstone Shopping Centre west of Greenstone Hill.

It continues southwards as Lungile Mtshali Road (formerly Van Riebeeck Road and Edenvale Road), to enter the town of Edenvale and bypass the town centre as Andries Pretorius Road before becoming 17th Avenue. Crossing Horwood Street (M16), the route becomes Hurlyvale Avenue then St. John Avenue before it t-junctions with Lungile Mtshali Road again, and turns south. South of Edenvale, at the suburb of Meadowbrook, the M37 crosses the R24 highway (Albertina Sisulu Freeway) and meets the western terminus of the M99 road before crossing the N12 highway and entering the city of Germiston, bypassing Bedfordview to the east.

From the N12 junction, the M37 goes southwards firstly as A G De Witt Drive (meeting the M52 road just after the N12 junction), then as Shamrock Road, to pass through the suburb of Primrose and reach a junction with the R29 road (Main Reef Road). It meets the southern terminus of the M57 road at the same junction. The R29 joins the M37 and they are one road up to the next junction, where the R29 turns east and the M37 becomes the road south-westwards (Johan Rissik Road) to enter the Germiston City Centre.

The M37 becomes Victoria Street northwards and Meyer Street southwards (one-way streets) and is the main road southwards through Germiston Central, co-signed with the M53, up to the Georgetown section, where it becomes Voortrekker Street westwards before becoming Joubert Street to the south-west. It reaches Germiston Lake, where it meets Refinery Road (M93 road) and becomes Lake Road. Just after, at the entrance to Rand Airport, it becomes Russell Road and bypasses the Airport to the east before crossing the N17 toll highway as Wits Rifles Drive.

From the N17 junction, it continues southwards as Black Reef Road, through the suburb of Wadeville, to reach an interchange with the R554/R103 (Heidelberg Road). It becomes Masakhane Street and passes under the N3 highway to enter the township of Katlehong, where it ends at the junction with Kgotso Street west of the Katlehong Railway Station.
