= M53 (Johannesburg) =

Metropolitan route in the Greater Johannesburg, South Africa

Metropolitan route M53

Route information
- Maintained by Johannesburg Roads Agency and Gauteng Department of Roads and Transport

Major junctions
- North end: M14 in Primrose
- R29 in Primrose M37 in Germiston CBD M46 in Germiston South M39 in Elsburg M49 in Elsburg; N17 in Wadeville M94 in Wadeville; R554 in Klipoortjie; R103 in Roodekop; N3 in Vosloorus M43 in Vosloorus
- South end: M7 in Zonkizizwe

Location
- Country: South Africa

Highway system
- Numbered routes of South Africa
← M52	→ M54

The M53 is a short metropolitan route in Greater Johannesburg, South Africa. It connects Germiston (capital of the Ekurhuleni Metropolitan Municipality) with Vosloorus via Elsburg.

== Route ==
The M53 begins in the Primrose suburb of Germiston, at a junction with the M14 route (Cydonia Road; Gorst Avenue). It begins by going southwards as Johan Rissik Road to reach a junction with the R29 route (Main Reef Road). It continues southwards to reach a junction with the M37 route (also named Johan Rissik Road), where it enters the Germiston City Centre.

The M37 joins the M53 and they form one road south-south-east through the city centre, becoming two one-way-streets (Victoria Street southwards and Meyer Street northwards) to reach the Georgetown section, where the M37 becomes its own road to the south-west (Joubert Street) while the M53 remains facing southwards (Victoria Street & Meyer Street). At the southern end of the CBD, the M53 meets the M46 route (Power Street) and enters Germiston South, where it becomes one road south-east (Elsburg Road; no-longer one-way streets) and bypasses the Germiston Stadium.

The M53 reaches the suburb of Elsburg, where it meets the M39 route (Simon Bekker Street) at a roundabout. The M53 joins the M39 southwards for a few metres before the M39 becomes Voortrekker Street south-eastwards while the M53 remains facing southwards (Olivier Street). It meets the southern terminus of the M49 route (Webber Road) before crossing the N17 highway and entering the suburb of Wadeville, where it meets the M94 route (Dekema Road).

It continues southwards as Osborn Road to pass through the Klipoortjie suburb and meet the R554 route (Van Dyk Road). It turns to the south-west and meets the R103 route (Old Heidelberg-Alberton Road) just west of the Rondebult suburb. It continues south-west, separating Roodekop from Mapleton, to cross the N3 highway and enter the township of Vosloorus. It forms the northern border of Vosloorus before turning south and forming the western border of Vosloorus (separating it from Katlehong) as Brickfield Road. It meets the southern terminus of the M43 route (Bierman Road) before becoming Mercury Street. It then becomes Kaunda Street and reaches its end at a junction with the M7 route (Dihlabakela Road) in Zonkizizwe.
