= 1980 South American Jaguars rugby union tour of South Africa =

- Date: Abr–May 1980
- Tour captain: Hugo Porta
Summary
| P | W | D | L |
Total
| 7 | 5 | 0 | 2 |
Test match
| 2 | 0 | 0 | 2 |
Opponent
| P | W | D | L |
South Africa
| 2 | 0 | 0 | 2 |

The 1980 Sudamérica XV rugby union tour of South Africa was a series of seven matches played by the Sudamérica XV (also named the Jaguars) rugby union team in South Africa in April and May 1980. The South American team won five of the matches but lost both that were against the South Africa national team.

The touring party was composed almost entirely of players from the Argentina national rugby union team and included all but one of the players who had played for Argentina in a drawn series with Australia in 1979. The touring party numbered twenty-six players, of whom one came from Brazil, one from Chile, one from Uruguay and one from Paraguay. The other twenty-two players came from Argentina, including the captain, Hugo Porta. Porta was asked to return to South Africa later that year to play for the South African Barbarians against the touring 1980 British Lions.

The players were individually invited to play in this tour and against South Africa in two matches played later during the Springboks tour of South America.

The "South America Jaguars" was a "ghost" Argentine national team, not officially recognised by Argentine Rugby Union, to elude the Argentine government prohibition that since the early 1970s had forbid any official relationship between any Argentine sport federation and South African and Rhodesian ones due to the apartheid politics of the two African countries. This started in 1971 when the Argentine government forbid the national team from playing a match in Rhodesia during the tour in South Africa. Later in 1973, after a controversial period, the government forbid any sport relationship with South Africa.

== Touring party ==
- Manager: M. Dolan
- Assistant Managers: L. Gradin, A. Otano
- Captain: Hugo Porta

=== Backs ===
(Argentina unless stated)

- Daniel Baetti
- Ricardo Muniz
- Marcelo Campo
- Roberto Canessa (Uruguay)
- Adolfo Cappelletti
- Marcelo Loffreda
- Rafael Madero
- P. Mirando-Cardosa (Brazil)
- F. Moscarda (Paraguay)
- Hugo Porta
- Juan Pablo Piccardo
- R. Landajo
- Alfredo Soares-Gache

=== Forwards ===
(Argentina unless stated)

- Gabriel Travaglini
- A. Voltan
- Ernesto Ure
- H. Silva
- Enrique Rodríguez
- Tomás Petersen
- Javier Pérez-Cobo
- Hugo Nicola
- Fernando Morel
- Alastair MacGregor Martin (Chile)
- Alejandro Iachetti
- Marcos Iachetti
- Alejandro Cubelli

== Matches ==
=== Summary ===
Test matches

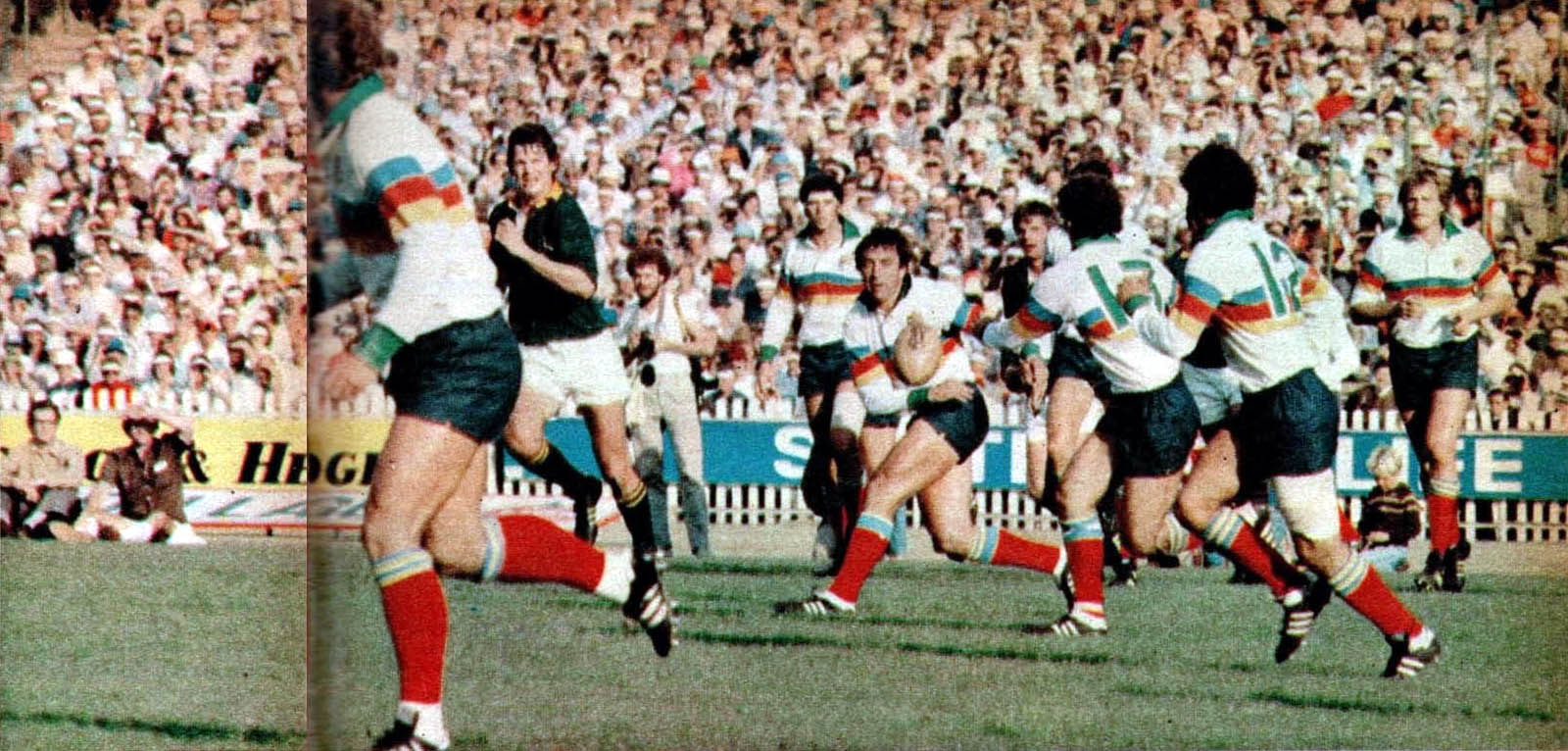
A moment of the first test at Wanderers Stadium

| # | Date | Rival | Score | Venue | City |
|---|---|---|---|---|---|
| 1 | 12 Apr | Boland | 42–12 | n/a | Wellington |
| 2 | 16 Apr | Northern Free State | 42–25 | n/a | Welkom |
| 3 | 19 Apr | SA Gazelles | 30–19 | n/a | Pretoria |
| 4 | 22 Apr | SE Transvaal | 30–21 | n/a | Witbank |
| 5 | 26 Apr | South Africa | 9–24 | Wanderers Stadium | Johannesburg |
| 6 | 29 Apr | Western Province | 15–13 | n/a | Cape Town |
| 7 | 3 May | South Africa | 9–18 | Kings Park Stadium | Durban |

Statistics
| Pl | W | D | L | PS | PC |
|---|---|---|---|---|---|
| 7 | 5 | 0 | 2 | 177 | 132 |

=== Details ===
12 April 1980

| Boland | 12–42 | Sudamérica XV |

Wellington

16 April 1980

| Northern Free State | 25–42 | Sudamérica XV |

Welkom

19 April 1980

| SA Gazelles (South Africa) | 19–30 | Sudamérica XV |

Pretoria

22 April 1980

| SE Transvaal | 21–30 | Sudamérica XV |

Witbank

26 April 1980

| South Africa | 24–9 | Sudamérica XV |
| Try: TD du Plessis; Germishuys, Mordt; Con: Botha 3 Pen: Botha; Drop: Botha | | Try: Travaglini; Con: Loffreda; Pen: Loffreda |

Wanderers Stadium, Johannesburg
Attendance: 34,000
Referee: Ken Rowlands (Wales)

Team details

| South Africa | | | Sudamérica XV |
| Pierre Edwards | FB | 15 | FB | Daniel Baetti |
| Ray Mordt | W | 14 | W | Adolfo Cappelletti |
| Willie du Plessis | C | 13 | C | Marcelo Loffreda |
| Peter Whipp | C | 12 | C | Rafael Madero |
| Gerrie Germishuys | W | 11 | W | Marcelo Campo |
| Naas Botha | FH | 10 | FH | Hugo Porta (capt.) |
| Tommy du Plessis | SH | 9 | SH | Tomas Landajo |
| (capt.) Morne du Plessis | N8 | 8 | N8 | Ernesto Ure |
| Theuns Stofberg | F | 7 | F | Gabriel Travaglini |
| Rob Louw | F | 6 | F | Tomas Petersen |
| Louis Moolman | L | 5 | L | Marcos Iachetti |
| Kevin de Klerk | L | 4 | L | Alejandro Iachetti |
| Johan Strauss | P | 3 | P | Hugo Nicola |
| Dave Frederickson | H | 2 | H | Alejandro Cubelli |
| Richard Prentis | P | 1 | P | Topo Rodriguez |

29 April 1980

| Western Province | 13–15 | Sudamérica XV |

Cape Town

3 May 1980

| South Africa | 18–9 | Sudamérica XV |
| Try: M du Plessis; Con: Botha; Pen: Botha; Drop: Botha 3 | | Pen: Piccardo 3 |

Kings Park, Durban
Attendance: 34,000
Referee: Ken Rowlands (Wales)

Team details

| South Africa | | | Sudamérica XV |
| Pierre Edwards | FB | 15 | FB | Daniel Baetti |
| Ray Mordt | W | 14 | W | Adolfo Cappelletti |
| Willie du Plessis | C | 13 | C | Juan Pablo Piccardo |
| Peter Whipp | C | 12 | C | Rafael Madero |
| Gerrie Germishuys | W | 11 | W | Marcelo Campo |
| Naas Botha | FH | 10 | FH | Hugo Porta (capt.) |
| Tommy du Plessis | SH | 9 | SH | Tomas Landajo |
| (capt.) Morne du Plessis | N8 | 8 | N8 | Hector Silva |
| Theuns Stofberg | F | 7 | F | Gabriel Travaglini |
| Rob Louw | F | 6 | F | Tomas Petersen |
| Louis Moolman | L | 5 | L | Ernesto Ure |
| Kevin de Klerk | L | 4 | L | Alejandro Iachetti |
| Daan du Plessis | P | 3 | P | Hugo Nicola |
| Dave Frederickson | H | 2 | H | Alejandro Cubelli |
| Richard Prentis | P | 1 | P | Topo Rodriguez |
| | | Replacements |
| Gysie Pienaar | FB | 16 |
| De Wet Ras | C | 17 |

== Bibliography ==
- Vivian Jenkins, ed. (1981). Rothmans Rugby Yearbook 1981–82. Rothmans Publications Ltd. pp. 47–51. ISBN 090757405X.
