= Lolly Jackson =

South African strip club owner (1956-2010)

- Born: Manoli Zachary c 1956; Belgian Congo
- Died: May 3, 2010 (aged 54); Edleen, Gauteng, South Africa
- Resting place: Southpark Cemetery, Elspark, Ekurhuleni, South Africa
- Other name: “King of Teaze”
- Occupations: Businessman; Strip club owner
- Known for: Founder of the Teazers chain of strip clubs
- Spouse: Demi Jackson
- Children: at least three: Samantha, Manoli, Julian; also a son George Zachary who died as infant

Emmanuel “Lolly” Jackson (known as Lolly Jackson ; born Manoli Zachary ;c. 1956– 3 May 2010) was a South African businessman who founded the Teazers chain of strip clubs.

== Early life ==
Lolly Jackson was born Manoli Zachary (sometimes rendered Emmanuel Zachary) to Greek parents who had fled the Belgian Congo for South Africa following the 1960 coup by Mobutu Sese Seko that ousted Patrice Lumumba from power.

The family settled on the East Rand, Johannesburg where they changed their surname to Jackson. His mother affectionately called him "Lolly", a nickname that later became his public identity.

Jackson’s formal education ended early. He was expelled from high school in Grade 8 after punching his principal, having already been expelled once in primary school for drawing a lewd sketch of a teacher.

During his youth, Jackson began trading in used cars under the name Honest Lolly’s Motors. He became known for his unconventional methods of concealing mechanical faults in the cars he sold, a reputation that eventually led him to abandon the business amid complaints and threats from dissatisfied customers.

He later founded the adult entertainment chain Teazers in the early 1990s, beginning with a club in Primrose, the suburb of his youth.

== Teazers business and controversies ==
Jackson established the Teazers brand in June 1996, opening his first club in Primrose, Germiston. He expanded the chain across South Africa, including Johannesburg suburbs (Rivonia, Midrand), Pretoria, Durban, Cape Town and others. He also founded a related venture called Teaze’Hers, another strip club intended to cater to female clientele. Jackson had a varied entrepreneurial past: he sold new cars, motor oil additives, biltong, helmets; he worked as a DJ and managed a sweets shop. He later founded a paving company, making his first substantial profits, before moving into adult entertainment. He said that Teazers is a large and profitable venture - especially the flagship Rivonia branch which earned him R2-million monthly.

Jackson was outspoken about maintaining standards in his clubs: rules about appearance, “house rules” for dancers, opposition to drug use, etc and boosted about paying a lot in salaries to his female workers.

In 2006, Jackson faced charges under South Africa's immigration law, among them the keeping of passports of foreign dancers, purportedly to prevent them from leaving employment. He was cleared of fraud and immigration contraventions by the Edenvale Magistrate’s Court in 2008.

In 2008, Jackson was criminally charged after assaulting two of his former employees, Thandi Maya and Alberto Nhandolo, during an incident at his Teazers club in Rivonia, Sandton. According to court records, Jackson shot Maya multiple times with a paintball gun loaded with rubber bullets and ordered two men to assault Nhandolo.

The case was heard in the Randburg Magistrate’s Court, where Jackson eventually entered into a plea agreement with the state, paying a R20,000 fine and R1,000 compensation to each complainant to avoid a two-year prison sentence, half of which was suspended for five years. Jackson claimed he was “framed” and described his decision to plead guilty as a commercial one due to mounting legal costs, which he said exceeded R500,000.

He alleged that most of the 27 witnesses called against him were former Teazers employees working for rival nightclub owner Andrew Phillips of The Grand. Jackson also pursued a defamation lawsuit against businessman Michael Kalymnios and his Ukrainian partner Yuliyana Moshorovska, accusing them of damaging his and Teazers’ reputation after they sued him for R4 million following public insults he directed at them.

In a separate incident, Jackson was arrested for speeding at 122 km/h in an 80 km/h zone, though the charge was later withdrawn after he claimed he had been rushing to assist an injured motorcyclist.

In 2009-2010, he faced further legal challenges including charges of extortion, assault, kidnapping, intimidation and crimen injuria.

== Death ==
On 3 May 2010, Jackson was shot and killed at a house in Edleen, Gauteng, sustaining multiple gunshot wounds. Jackson was buried in a quiet funeral presided over by a Greek Orthodox priest at the Southpark Cemetery, Ekurhuleni. Hundreds gathered. His coffin was escorted by a convoy of more than 30 cars led by a black stretch Hummer and was interred beside the graves of his parents and infant son, George Zachary. Family spokesman Sean Newman expressed confidence that police would eventually “bring the killers to book.” During the service, Jackson’s wife, Demi, broke down in tears, and his brother Costa described him as “a supportive brother” who “was always involved, always in trouble.” As mourners began to leave, a gust of wind toppled a framed photo of Jackson from its pedestal, shattering the glass — prompting Costa Jackson to remark, “He went out with a bang! Celebrate".

Police identified George Smith as the suspect in the murder as Jackson was killed while visiting him.

In September 2011, police found the dead body of Mark Andrews, a business partner of Jackson, alongside the R59 road in Brackendowns, Alberton. The body was found with a bullet wound to the head and the hands tied behind the back. Andrews was reported to have had a dispute with Jackson over ownership and operation of the Teazers branch in Cresta, Johannesburg. Police also noted that Andrews had been suspected of involvement in the kidnapping and possible murder of Jackson’s lawyer, Ian Jordaan, whose charred body was found days earlier, though investigators cautioned that links between the deaths had not been firmly established.

In 2015, George Smith (also known as George Louka), a suspect in the murder of Jackson, filed an affidavit asserting that the actual shooter was Radovan Krejcir, a Czech national and fugitive serving jail time in South Africa. Louka claimed that the fatal shooting occurred following a dispute about money laundering. He alleged that Krejcir presented Jackson with fake documents suggesting he had deposited funds into an overseas account belonging to Jackson, and when Jackson discovered the deception, a confrontation ensued.

According to the affidavit, the meeting took place at Louka’s rented residence in Kempton Park, east of Johannesburg, and ended with Krejcir allegedly shooting Jackson and ordering Louka to help conceal the body. In Louka’s account, he later fled the scene in Jackson’s Jeep, fearing for his own life.

Law enforcement sources and forensic consultants have publicly stated that investigations regard the money laundering dispute as a possible motive, and the case docket remains under the purview of the Hawks (South Africa’s serious organised crime unit).

At the time of the affidavit, Krejcir was incarcerated on unrelated charges and had denied any involvement. Prosecutors indicated they intended to call Krejcir as a witness against Louka in the forthcoming trial. However, the National Prosecuting Authority (NPA) stated that no formal deal or immunity agreement had been made with Louka’s legal team. The case has been subject to delays and continued controversy.

== Estate ==
After his death, Jackson’s estate faced claims by the South African Revenue Service (SARS) reported to be R100-million, including frozen assets and outstanding tax liabilities.

There was dispute over his will. Shaun Russouw, owner of the Teazers branch in Durban, claimed there was a second will indicating he should inherit certain parts of Jackson’s business, but the court found such evidence insufficient.
