= M14 (Johannesburg) =

Metropolitan route in the City of Johannesburg, South Africa

Metropolitan route M14

Route information
- Maintained by Johannesburg Roads Agency and Gauteng Department of Roads and Transport
- Length: 11.3 km (7.0 mi)

Major junctions
- West end: R29 in Jeppestown
- M33 in Malvern M52 in Malvern East M53 in Primrose Hill

- East end: M37 in Primrose

Location
- Country: South Africa

Highway system
- Numbered routes of South Africa
← M13	→ M16

The M14 is a short metropolitan route in the Greater Johannesburg metropolitan area, South Africa. The route connects Jeppestown (just east of the Johannesburg CBD) with Primrose in northern Germiston.

== Route ==
The M14 begins at a T-junction with the R29 (Main Reef Road) in the Jeppestown suburb of Johannesburg. The M14 heads east as Jules Street into Malvern. It crosses the M33 (Monmouth Street; 31st Street) before continuing east through Malvern East. It then continues north-east as Geldenhuis Road and meets the M52 (Van Buuren Road) before continuing east-north-east, now as Cydonia Road, to fly over the N3/N12 highway (Eastern Bypass) and enter the city of Germiston, first passing through the suburb of Primrose Hill. It becomes Gorst Avenue, then Churchill Avenue, to pass through Primrose and reach its end at an intersection with the M37 (A.G. de Witt Drive; Shamrock Road).
