= M49 =

M49 or M-49 may be:

- Messier 49, an elliptical galaxy in the constellation Virgo
- The 49th known Mersenne prime
- M49 motorway, a motorway in Great Britain
- M49 (Cape Town), a Metropolitan Route in Cape Town, South Africa
- M49 (Johannesburg), a Metropolitan Route in Johannesburg, South Africa
- M49 expressway (Hungary), a planned highway
- M49 telescope, a telescope used by the United States military
- M-49 (Michigan highway), a Michigan state highway
- UN M49, the United Nations' "Standard Country or Area Codes for Statistical Use"
- M/49, or the Neuhausen pistol, the Danish name for the SIG Sauer P210
