= M78 (Johannesburg) =

Metropolitan route in Greater Johannesburg, South Africa

Metropolitan route M78

Route information
- Maintained by Johannesburg Roads Agency and Gauteng Department of Roads and Transport
- Length: 6.1 km (3.8 mi)

Major junctions
- North end: R25 near Modderfontein
- M59 in Sebenza, Edenvale; M16 in Edenglen, Edenvale M99 in Klopper Park, Germiston

- South end: M59 in Klopper Park, Germiston

Location
- Country: South Africa

Highway system
- Numbered routes of South Africa
← M77	→ M79

The M78 is a short metropolitan route in Greater Johannesburg, South Africa. It is a short route connecting Illiondale with Klopper Park in the Edenvale/Germiston area of Ekurhuleni Metropolitan Municipality.

== Route ==
The M78 begins at a junction with the R25 road in the suburb of Illiondale (south of Modderfontein and north-east of Edenvale CBD). It begins by going southwards through Illiondale to reach a junction with the M59 road (Terrace Road). It continues south as Harris Avenue, separating the Sebenza and Edenglen suburbs of Edenvale, to reach a junction with the M16 road (Baker Road) east of Edenvale CBD. The M16 joins the M78 and they are one road southwards for a few metres before the M16 becomes its own road eastwards (Harris Avenue) while the M78 remains as the southerly road (Shelton Road).

The M78 proceeds to fly over the R24 highway (Albertina Sisulu Freeway) and enter Klopper Park (the northernmost suburb of Germiston), where it reaches a junction with the M99 road (Herman Street). It proceeds south-east through Klopper Park to reach its end at another junction with the M59 road (Lazarus Mawela Road).
