= M99 (Johannesburg) =

Metropolitan route in the City of Johannesburg, South Africa

Metropolitan route M99

Route information
- Maintained by Johannesburg Roads Agency and Gauteng Department of Roads and Transport
- Length: 7.8 km (4.8 mi)

Major junctions
- East end: M57 near OR Tambo Int'l

- M39 in Isando, Kempton Park M59 in Klopper Park, Germiston M78 in Klopper Park, Germiston

- West end: M37 in Meadowbrook, Bedfordview

Location
- Country: South Africa

Highway system
- Numbered routes of South Africa
| ← M98 |

The M99 is a short metropolitan route in Greater Johannesburg, South Africa. For its entire route, it parallels the R24 highway (Albertina Sisulu Freeway) in the City of Ekurhuleni Metropolitan Municipality.

== Route ==
The M99 begins at a junction with the M57 road (Pretoria Road) near O. R. Tambo International Airport in the southern part of Kempton Park. It begins by going eastwards towards the airport and at the next junction, the M99 turns north, then west, via a left turn to pass under the M57 and head westwards.

It heads west-south-west as Electron Avenue, parallel to the R24 highway (Albertina Sisulu Freeway), to form the northern border of the southernmost suburb of Kempton Park (Isando Industrial Area) and reach a junction with the M39 road (Isando Road). Shortly after, it reaches a junction with the M59 road (Lazarus Mawela Road).

The M99 continues west-south-west as Herman Street, still parallel to the R24, to pass north of some of the northern suburbs of Germiston (Klopper Park and Meadowdale) before entering the suburb of Meadowbrook at the north-eastern corner of Bedfordview (just south of Edenvale), where it reaches its end at a junction with the M37 road (Lungile Mtshali Road).
