= Johann Strauss (disambiguation) =

Johann Strauss II (1825–1899) or Johann Strauss Jr. was an Austrian composer, known as the "Waltz King".

Johann Strauss may also refer to:

- Johann Strauss I (1804–1849), or Johann Strauss Sr., Austrian composer, father of Johann Strauss II
- Johann Strauss III (1866–1939), Austrian composer, son of Eduard Strauss and grandson of Johann I
- Johan Strauss (rugby union) (born 1951), South African rugby union player

== Fictional character ==
- Johann Strauss, a supportive character of the video game Quake IV

== See also ==
- John Strauss (1920–2011), American composer and music editor
