= Heunis =

Heunis is a surname. Notable people with the surname include:

- Chris Heunis (1927–2006), South African lawyer and politician
- Claudia Heunis (born 1989), South African track and field athlete
- Johan Heunis (born 1958), South African rugby union player
