= Teazers =

- Type: Private
- Industry: Adult entertainment / Nightlife
- Founded: June 1996 in Primrose, East Rand
- Founder: Emmanuel “Lolly” Jackson
- Headquarters: Johannesburg, South Africa
- Area served: Multiple cities in South Africa including Johannesburg, Pretoria, Durban, Cape Town and Midrand
- Key people: Lolly Jackson (owner until 2010)
- Products: Strip clubs, adult entertainment, private dances, table dances etc.
- Revenue: Unknown
- Number of employees: ~300 (across chain)
- Website: Teazers official website

Teazers is a chain of strip clubs in South Africa, founded by Emmanuel “Lolly” Jackson in June 1996. It operates in various major cities and has been both popular and controversial for its advertising, legal disputes and roles in the country’s adult entertainment sector.

After Jackson’s death in May 2010, the chain briefly closed clubs in respect, but then resumed operations under its existing structure.

Jackson emphasised maintaining certain standards in the operation: rules governing appearance, behaviour (e.g. hair, nails, no smoking or drinking on the floor), to promote a clean, professional environment.

Teazers also ventured into a related brand, Teaze’Hers, which catered to female clientele. Teazers offers a mix of adult entertainment services that include stage performances, strip shows, table dances, private booths, private dances, bars and food services within the club premises.

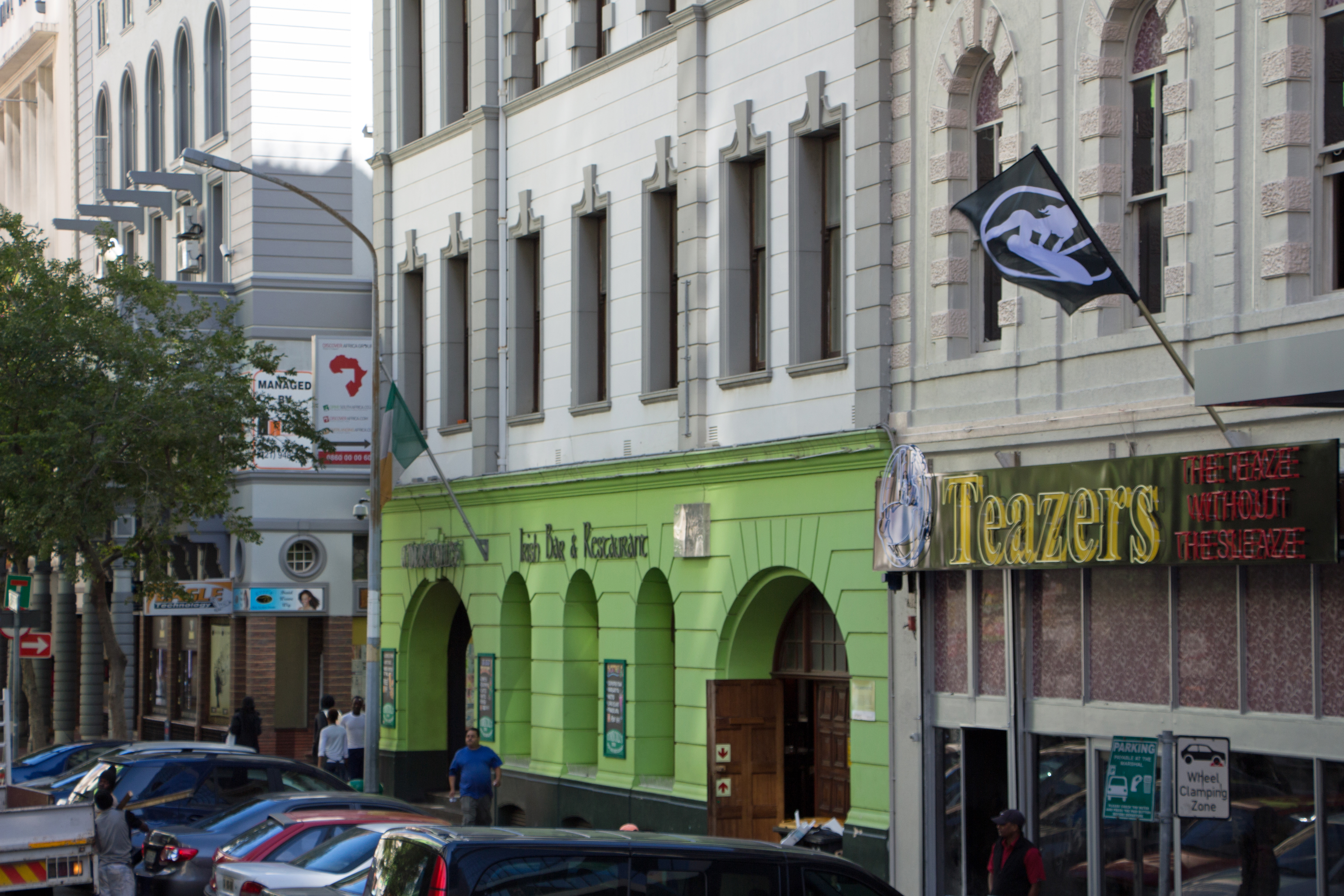
O'Driscoll's Irish Pub and Teazers strip club, corner of Hout and Burg Streets, Cape Town, South Africa (2014)
