= M99 =

M99 or M-99 may refer to:

== Places ==
- M-99 (Michigan highway), a state highway in south central Michigan
- Messier 99, an unbarred spiral galaxy approximately 60 million light-years away in the constellation Coma Berenices
- M99 road (Johannesburg), Metropolitan route in the City of Johannesburg, South Africa

== Rifles ==
- Barrett M99, a sniper rifle
- Zijiang M99, a Chinese anti-materiel rifle

== Tranquilizer ==
- Etorphine (a.k.a. Immobilon or M99), a veterinary tranquilizer
