= Cousin murders =

Murder and rape of two cousins on 10 January 1966 in Odendaalsrus, South Africa

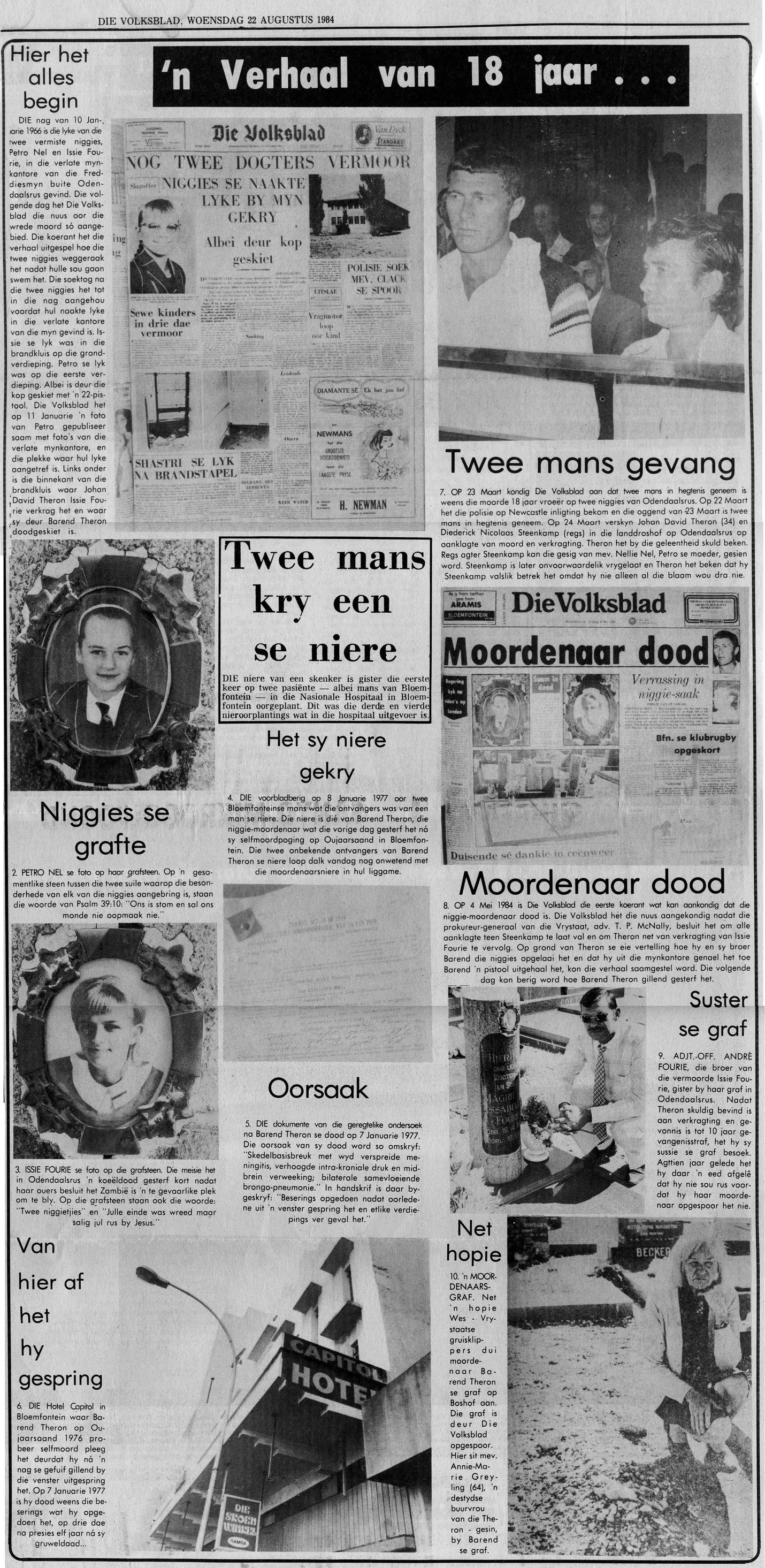
- Volksblad articles about the niece murders
- Location: Odendaalsrus, South Africa
- Date: 10 January 1966; 60 years ago
- Attack type: Familicide, nepiticide
- Deaths: 2
- Perpetrators: John David Theron, Barend Theron
- Convictions: Murder, rape

The cousin murders or niece murders took place on 10 January 1966 in Odendaalsrus, South Africa and received national news coverage. John David Theron involved in the crime was sentenced to 10 years in 1984, which was later reduced to 6 years on appeal. His brother Barend Theron, the alleged murderer, committed suicide before any suspects could be identified. In 1976, he jumped head first from the third floor of the Capitol Hotel in Bloemfontein. The story was dramatised in the KykNET series Niggies which aired in 2025.

== Incident ==
Petronella (Petro) Nel lived with her parents at Odendaalsrus. She was 12 years old. Her cousin, Magrieta (Issie) Fourie, also 12 years old, was visiting Petronella at the time of this incident. Her home was in Zambia.

On Monday afternoon, 10 January 1966, the nieces left the Nel residence to go swimming at the municipal swimming pool. John David Theron and his brother, Barend, left their home in Elsburg, East Rand, on the same Monday on their way to Kimberley. During the afternoon they drove through Odendaalsrus. The Theron brothers picked up the cousins and took them to an old abandoned Freddies mine double-storey building. The building is about 1.2 km from the swimming pool. All four of them went into the building.

The nieces were asked to consent to sex, but they refused. Barend then produced a pistol and ordered the nieces to take off their clothes. They refused. The accused stripped Fourie naked and tied her hands behind her back with electric wire. Barend took Nel to the first floor. He took Fourie's clothes, shoes, swimsuit and towel with him. John raped Fourie, who was still a virgin, in a safe on the ground floor.

Barend then shot Fourie dead. He also shot Nel, whose hands and feet were tied. The Theron brothers left the scene, abandoned their plan to drive to Kimberley and returned to Elsburg. The nieces' bodies were found the next day.

Andre Fourie, the brother of (Issie) Fourie, was supposed to look after the cousins that day, but did not do so and arrived at the swimming pool too late. Andre Fourie wanted to become a doctor but swore an oath to the grave that he would catch the culprit and joined the South African Police (SAP). He was also later involved in solving the case.

== Sentencing ==
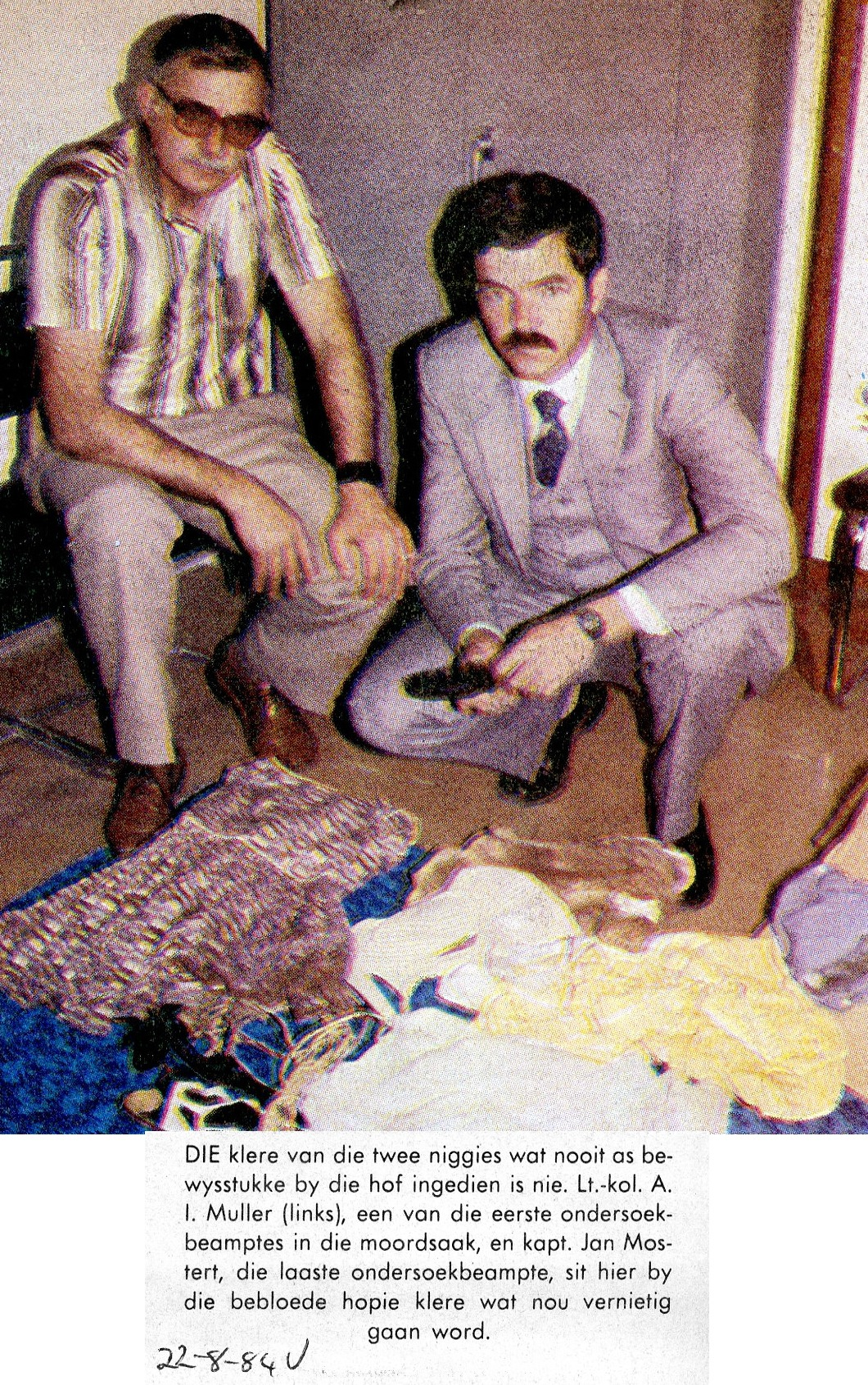
Volksblad clipping from 22 August 1984.

In 1984, 19 years after the incident, Theron, one of the rapists, confided in a cellmate in prison and confessed to the crime. Theron and Diederick Steenkamp then appeared on 27 March 1984 on charges of murder and rape in the court at Odendaalsrus. Theron said that he did not murder them. Steenkamp had an alibi and was later acquitted. Theron's older brother, Barend, is considered the real mastermind behind the tragedy. He was a man with self-esteem problems. One of his hands was disabled and he always covered it with a stocking. Everyone was afraid of this violent bully who abused alcohol and dagga.

The trial of Theron took place in the Circuit Court at Odendaalsrus, before R Smuts and one assessor. He pleaded guilty and a written statement from him was submitted to the Trial Court in terms of section 112 (2) of Act 51 of 1977. The sentence of 10 years imprisonment was imposed on him.

== Media coverage ==
The murders of the two cousins captured the nation’s imagination at the time. Chris (Molie) Moolman, then the Goudveld representative of Die Volksblad, wrote the first reports on the murders. Moolman obtained the story from the detective chief in Welkom on his usual morning rounds. Within an hour, a report was on the desk of the news editor, Gert Terblanche. Hennie van Deventer, then the chief sub-editor of Die Volksblad, was warned to make provision for the article on the front page.

== Niggies television series ==
Niggies is an Afrikaans thriller based on the niece murders and was first shown on kykNET from 25 March to 6 May 2025. The thriller was written by Saartjie Botha and Philip Rademeyer.
