= M98 (Johannesburg) =

Metropolitan route in the City of Johannesburg, South Africa

Metropolitan route M98

Route information
- Maintained by Johannesburg Roads Agency and Gauteng Department of Roads and Transport

Major junctions
- East end: M22
- West end: M37

Location
- Country: South Africa

Highway system
- Numbered routes of South Africa
← M97	→ M99

The M98 is a short metropolitan route in Johannesburg, South Africa.

== Route ==
The M98 begins at the M22 and ends at the M37.
