= M97 (Johannesburg) =

Metropolitan route in the City of Johannesburg, South Africa

Metropolitan route M97

Route information
- Maintained by Johannesburg Roads Agency and Gauteng Department of Roads and Transport

Major junctions
- East end: M22
- West end: M16

Location
- Country: South Africa

Highway system
- Numbered routes of South Africa
← M96	→ M98

The M97 is a short metropolitan route in the Greater Johannesburg metropolitan area, South Africa.

== Route ==
The M97 begins at the M22 and ends at the M16.
