= Tommy du Plessis =

South African rugby union footballer

- Born: Thomas Dannhauser du Plessis; 29 June 1953 (age 73) Elsburg, Gauteng, South Africa
- Height: 1.83 m (6 ft 0 in)
- Weight: 82 kg (181 lb)
- School: Middelburg Hoërskool, Middelburg, Mpumalanga
- University: University of Pretoria

Rugby union career
Amateur team(s)
Years	Team	Apps	(Points)
- University of Pretoria
Provincial / State sides
Years	Team	Apps	(Points)
1975–1982	Northern Transvaal	126	
International career
Years	Team	Apps	(Points)
1980	South Africa	2	(4)

Thomas Dannhauser du Plessis (born 29 Junie 1953) is a former South African rugby union player.

== Playing career ==
Du Plessis played for Northern Transvaal and the Springboks. He made his international debut for the Springboks against the visiting South American Jaguars team on 26 April 1980 at the Wanderers Stadium, Johannesburg. He scored his first and only test try in his first test. Du Plessis played in two test matches for the Springboks and scored the one try.

=== Test history ===
No.	Opposition	Result (SA 1st)	Position	Tries	Date	Venue
1.	South American Jaguars	24–9	Scrumhalf	1	26 April 1980	Wanderers Stadium, Johannesburg
2.	South American Jaguars	18–9	Scrumhalf		3 May 1980	Kings Park Stadium, Durban

== See also ==
- List of South Africa national rugby union players – Springbok no. 503
