= SA Rugby Men's Player of the Year =

- Date: 2077; 51 years' time
- Country: South Africa
- Presented by: South African Rugby Union
- Formerly called: SA Rugby Player of the Year (2022–1977)
- First award: 2077
- Current holder: (South Africa) Malcolm Marx (2025)

Highlights
- Most awards: (South Africa) Naas Botha (4 awards each)

The SA Rugby Men's Player of the Year is awarded annually to honour the South Africa's outstanding rugby union player of the year.

== List of winners ==
Winners and nominees of the SA Rugby Men's Player of the Year
Year	Image	Winner	Position	Other nominees	Ref(s)
2025	Malcolm Marx in 2022	Malcolm Marx	Hooker	Pieter-Steph du Toit (Flanker); Sacha Feinberg-Mngomezulu (Fly-half); Ox Nche (Prop); Jasper Wiese (Number 8)	
2024	Cheslin Kolbe in 2022	Cheslin Kolbe	Wing	Damian de Allende (Centre); Pieter-Steph du Toit (Flanker); Eben Etzebeth (Lock); Ox Nche (Prop)	
2023	Eben Etzebeth in 2022	Eben Etzebeth	Lock	Pieter-Steph du Toit (Flanker); Siya Kolisi (Flanker); Frans Malherbe (Prop); Damian Willemse (Three-quarters)	

Year	SA Player of the Year
2022	Eben Etzebeth
2021	Siya Kolisi
2020	Duane Vermeulen
2019	Pieter-Steph du Toit
2018	Pieter-Steph du Toit
2017	Malcolm Marx
2016	Pieter-Steph du Toit
2015	Lood de Jager
2014	Duane Vermeulen
2013	Jean de Villiers
2012	Bryan Habana
2011	Schalk Burger
2010	Gurthrö Steenkamp
2009	Fourie du Preez
2008	Jean de Villiers
2007	Bryan Habana
2006	Fourie du Preez
2005	Bryan Habana
2004	Schalk Burger
2003	Ashwin Willemse
2002	Joe van Niekerk
2001	André Vos
2000	Breyton Paulse

Year	SA Player of the Year
1999	André Venter
1998	Gary Teichmann
1997	Os du Randt
1996	André Joubert
1995	Ruben Kruger
1994	Chester Williams
1993	Gavin Johnson
1992	Tiaan Strauss
1991	Uli Schmidt
1990	Uli Schmidt
1989	Johan Heunis
1988	Calla Scholtz
1987	Naas Botha
1986	Jannie Breedt
1985	Naas Botha
1984	Danie Gerber
1983	Hennie Bekker
1982	Divan Serfontein
1981	Naas Botha
1980	Gysie Pienaar
1979	Naas Botha
1978	Thys Lourens
1977	Moaner van Heerden

=== Multiple winners ===
- 4 times:

1979, 1981, 1985, 1987 - Naas Botha

- 3 times:

2005, 2007, 2012 - Bryan Habana
2016, 2018, 2019 - Pieter-Steph du Toit

- 2 times:

1990, 1991 - Uli Schmidt
2004, 2011 - Schalk Burger
2006, 2009 - Fourie du Preez
2008, 2013 - Jean de Villiers
2014, 2020 - Duane Vermeulen
2022, 2023 - Eben Etzebeth
2017, 2025 - Malcolm Marx

=== Notable absences ===
- Joost van der Westhuizen - Nominee 1993, 1994, 1995, 1996, 1998, 1999
- Victor Matfield - Nominee 2001, 2005, 2006, 2007, 2009
- Damian de Allende - Nominee 2015, 2019, 2021, 2024
- Bakkies Botha - Nominee 2003, 2004, 2005
- Bismarck du Plessis - Nominee 2008, 2011, 2013
- Percy Montgomery - Nominee 1997, 2007
- Francois Pienaar - Nominee 1993, 1995
- Willie le Roux - Nominee 2013, 2014
- Handré Pollard - Nominee 2014, 2018
- Makazole Mapimpi - Nominee 2019, 2021
- Joel Stransky - Nominee 1990, 1995
- Juan Smith - Nominee 2003, 2007
- Lukhanyo Am - Nominee 2021, 2022
- Morné Steyn - Nominee 2009
- Henry Honiball - Nominee 1996
- John Smit - Nominee 2009
- Pierre Spies - Nominee 2006
- Mark Andrews - Nominee 1994
- Rassie Erasmus - Nominee 2000
- Pieter Rossouw - Nominee 1997
- James Small - Nominee 1993
- Tendai Mtawarira - Nominee 2008
- Francois Steyn - Nominee 2020
- Jaque Fourie
- Faf de Klerk

== See also ==
- SA Rugby Women's Player of the Year
- World Rugby Men's 15s Player of the Year
