= Pierre Edwards (rugby union) =

South African rugby union footballer

- Born: Peter Edwards; 23 May 1953 (age 73) George, Western Cape, South Africa
- Height: 1.93 m (6 ft 4 in)
- Weight: 82 kg (181 lb)
- School: Afrikaanse Hoër Seunskool, Pretoria
- University: University of Pretoria

Rugby union career
- Position: Full-back
Amateur team(s)
Years	Team	Apps	(Points)
1975–1979	University of Pretoria		
1980–1984	Harlequins		
Provincial / State sides
Years	Team	Apps	(Points)
1977–1984	Northern Transvaal	88	(202)
International career
Years	Team	Apps	(Points)
1980	South Africa	2	

Peter 'Pierre' Edwards (born 23 May 1953) is a former South African rugby union player.

== Playing career ==
Edwards played for Northern Transvaal and the Springboks. He made his international debut for the Springboks against the visiting South American Jaguars team on 26 April 1980 at the Wanderers Stadium, Johannesburg. Edwards also started in the second test against the South American Jaguars, but got injured after 12 minutes in the second half and was replaced by Gysie Pienaar. He thereafter never again played for the Springboks.

=== Test history ===
No.	Opposition	Result (SA 1st)	Position	Tries	Date	Venue
1.	South American Jaguars	24–9	Full-back		26 April 1980	Wanderers Stadium, Johannesburg
2.	South American Jaguars	18–9	Full-back		3 May 1980	Kings Park Stadium, Durban

== See also ==
- List of South Africa national rugby union players – Springbok no. 499
