= OTEL Telecoms =

South African telecommunication company

- Industry: Telecommunications
- Founded: 1995
- Headquarters: Boksburg, City of Ekurhuleni Metropolitan Municipality, South Africa
- Key people: Mohammad Ashraf Patel, CEO
- Products: SIP Trunking 1Cloud Hosted PBX; Fax over IP TVNO Class 5 Softswitch
- Website: www.otelafrica.com/

OTEL Telecoms (also known as Ohren Telecom and O-Tel) is a South African national telecommunications company based in Boksburg. Established in 1995, the company provides Infrastructure as a service VoIP and broadband products.

O-tel is a member of South African Internet industry body, Internet Service Providers Association (ISPA), where OTEL's CEO Mohammad Patel serves in the senior management committee, and holds ECS and ECNS telecom licences. The company is also a member of Wireless Access Providers Association (WAPA) of South Africa, where O-tel's CEO Mohammad Patel is the Deputy Chairman.

== History and overview ==
OTEL telecoms was founded in 1995 as part of South African IT distributor World Computer Systems, developing VoIP products.

In 2009 the company received an ECNS license and spun off from WCS division Illuder.com. It utilised existing Vodacom’s 3G and Telkom's ADSL network in its first telephone line offering. Since then the company has grown significantly, and as of 2011 it offered a set of white label services, including SIP trunking, 1cloud hosted PBX, fax over IP, Centrex cloud call centre, Terrestrial Virtual Network Operator and leased line service.

In August 2013, the company announced expansion of its presence at Teraco Isando and Teraco Cape Town data centres, and its shift from voice transit services to IaaS model, providing voice over Internet Protocol and fibre enabled broadband products to various licensed operators and resellers across Southern Africa.
