= Johan Heunis =

South African rugby union footballer

- Born: Johan Wilhelm Heunis; 26 January 1958 (age 68) George, Western Cape, South Africa
- Height: 1.82 m (6 ft 0 in)
- Weight: 87 kg (192 lb)
- School: Outeniqua High School, George
- University: University of Port Elizabeth

Rugby union career
- Position: Fullback
Provincial / State sides
Years	Team	Apps	(Points)
1979–1980	Eastern Province		
1981–1989	Northern Transvaal	110	(29)
International career
Years	Team	Apps	(Points)
1981–1989	South Africa	14	(41)

Johan Wilhelm Heunis (born 26 January 1958 in George, Western Cape, South Africa) is a former South African rugby union player.

== Playing career ==
Heunis started his career in Port Elizabeth while studying law at the University of Port Elizabeth (Nelson Mandela Metropolitan University) and made his provincial debut for Eastern Province in 1979. After receiving his call up for his national service in Pretoria, he moved to Pretoria and gained Northern Transvaal colours in 1981.

Heunis made his test debut for the Springboks during the 1981 tour of New Zealand as a replacement for Gysie Pienaar in the third test on 12 September 1981 at Eden Park in Auckland. His first start for the Springboks in a test match was against the USA on 20 September 1981 at the Owl Creek Polo ground in Glenville, New York. Heunis played 14 test matches for the Springboks, scoring 41 points. He played a further 10 tour matches for the Springboks in which he scored 31 points.

=== Test history ===
No.	Opposition	Result (SA 1st)	Position	Points	Date	Venue
1.	New Zealand	22–25	Replacement		12 September 1981	Eden Park, Auckland
2.	United States	38–7	Fullback		20 September 1981	Owl Creek Polo ground, Glenville, New York
3.	South American Jaguars	50–18	Fullback	3 (1 pen)	27 March 1982	Loftus Versfeld, Pretoria
4.	South American Jaguars	12–21	Fullback		3 April 1982	Free State Stadium, Bloemfontein
5.	England	33–15	Fullback	21 (3 con, 5 pen)	2 June 1984	Boet Erasmus, Port Elizabeth
6.	England	35–9	Fullback	9 (3 con, 1 pen)	9 June 1984	Ellis Park Stadium, Johannesburg
7.	South American Jaguars	32–15	Fullback	4 (1 try)	20 October 1984	Loftus Versfeld, Pretoria
8.	South American Jaguars	21–13	Fullback		27 October 1984	Newlands, Cape Town
9.	New Zealand Cavaliers	21–15	Fullback		10 May 1986	Newlands, Cape Town
10.	New Zealand Cavaliers	18–19	Fullback		17 May 1986	Kings Park, Durban
11.	New Zealand Cavaliers	33–18	Fullback		24 May 1986	Loftus Versfeld, Pretoria
12.	New Zealand Cavaliers	24–10	Fullback		31 May 1986	Ellis Park, Johannesburg
13.	World XV	20–19	Fullback		26 Aug 1989	Newlands, Cape Town
14.	World XV	22–16	Fullback	4 (1try)	2 Sep 1989	Ellis Park, Johannesburg

Legend: pen = penalty (3 pts.); con = conversion (2 pts.), drop = drop kick (3 pts.).

== Accolades ==
Heunis was named the SA Rugby Player of the Year for 1989

== See also ==
- List of South Africa national rugby union players – Springbok no. 521
