= Daan du Plessis =

South Africa international rugby union player

- Born: Daniël Coenraad du Plessis; 9 August 1948 (age 78) Potchefstroom, North West, South Africa
- Height: 1.83 m (6 ft 0 in)
- Weight: 107 kg (236 lb)
- School: Hoër Volkskool, Potchefstroom
- University: University of Pretoria

Rugby union career
Amateur team(s)
Years	Team	Apps	(Points)
- University of Pretoria
Provincial / State sides
Years	Team	Apps	(Points)
1973	Northern Transvaal		
International career
Years	Team	Apps	(Points)
1977–1980	South Africa	2	

Daniël Coenraad du Plessis (born 9 August 1948 in Potchefstroom, North West, South Africa) is a former South African rugby union player.

== Playing career ==
Du Plessis played for Northern Transvaal in the South African Currie Cup competition. He was selected on the replacement bench for the Springboks during the test series against the 1976 visiting All Blacks, but did not get any game time. Du Plessis made his debut for the Springboks against the touring World XV on 27 August 1977 at Loftus Versveld in Pretoria. He played his second and last test match for the Springboks against the South American Jaguars on 3 May 1980 at Kings Park Stadium in Durban.

=== Test history ===
No.	Opposition	Result (SA 1st)	Position	Tries	Date	Venue
1.	World XV	45–24	Tighthead prop		27 August 1977	Loftus Versveld, Pretoria
2.	South American Jaguars	18–9	Tighthead prop		3 May 1980	Kings Park Stadium, Durban

== See also ==
- List of South Africa national rugby union players – Springbok no. 496
