= Eastgate Shopping Centre, Johannesburg =

Shopping centre in Bedfordview, South Africa

Eastgate Shopping Centre
- Location: Bradford Road, Bedfordview, Ekurhuleni, South Africa
- Coordinates: 26°10′47″S 28°6′59″E
- Address: 43 Bradford Road, Bedfordview, Ekurhuleni
- Opened: 1979; 47 years ago
- Manager: JHI Retail
- Owner: Liberty Holdings Limited, Liberty Two Degrees
- Num. of stores: 300
- Floor area: 145,240 square metres
- Website: www.eastgateshops.com

Eastgate Shopping Centre is a super-regional shopping centre in Bedfordview, near Bedford Gardens and the Johannesburg city centre in Gauteng. It remains one of the largest centres in the country and is the fourth largest shopping centre in Gauteng, after Mall of Africa, Sandton City and Menlyn Park. The centre lies next to the R24 airport freeway, between the Johannesburg CBD to the west and O. R. Tambo International Airport to the east.

== History ==
Eastgate was Johannesburg's first 'super-regional' shopping centre. The decision to build Eastgate was taken in 1974 by Rapp & Maister. It was to be built on an 18 ha site with 5 ha inside the Johannesburg municipality while the other 13 ha was in Bedfordview. It was planned to be opened in 1978 and would have 90,000sqm of retail space with major tenants being OK Bazaars, Edgars, Woolworths, Greatermans and John Orrs. There would be another 180 smaller stores, four cinemas and 5,000 parking bays. When it opened in 1979, it was the largest shopping centre in the Southern Hemisphere.

=== Further upgrades ===
A R 300,000,000 expansion was completed in 2010, which brings Eastgate to over 121,000 m^{2} (1,300,000 sq ft). A few years later, the centre underwent another major redevelopment by Liberty Life to modernise both the retail and office components, which was completed in 2017. To this day, it is managed by Liberty Properties on behalf of the parent company, Liberty Holdings Limited. The centre is currently over 145,000 m^{2} (1,560,000 sq ft).

Eastgate Shopping Centre is frequented by over 80,000 shoppers on Saturdays and over 2 million shoppers during an average month. The shopping centre offers Bureau de change facilities. Major retailers include one of the most successful Woolworths in South Africa and a recently refurbished cinema complex. The centre has over 250 stores, which include more than 60 fashion boutiques and 13 jewellers.

Unusual for a single complex, the building straddled the municipal boundaries of the City of Johannesburg Metropolitan Municipality and Ekurhuleni Metropolitan Municipality. However, in 2013, the boundary was adjusted by the Municipal Demarcation Board to move Eastgate fully into Ekurhuleni.
