= Thys Lourens =

South African rugby union footballer

- Born: Matthys Johannes Lourens; 15 May 1943 (age 83) Vryheid, KwaZulu-Natal
- Height: 1.83 m (6 ft 0 in)
- Weight: 90 kg (198 lb)
- School: Vryheid High School

Rugby union career
Provincial / State sides
Years	Team	Apps	(Points)
	Northern Transvaal	168	
International career
Years	Team	Apps	(Points)
1968	South Africa	3	(3)

Matthys Johannes 'Thys' Lourens (born 15 May 1943) is a former South African rugby union Rugby player.

== Playing career ==
Lourens played 168 first class provincial matches for Northern Transvaal, 91 of which were in the Currie Cup competition. He captained the team on 84 occasions and scored 63 tries.

Only Louis Moolman (171), Naas Botha (179) and Burger Geldenhuys (184) have played in more matches than Lourens. His usual position was as a flanker, where he also played for the national team, the Springboks.

He represented South Africa thrice, the first on 22 June 1968, when he played at flanker in a match against the British & Irish Lions at the Boet Erasmus Stadium in Port Elizabeth, which resulted in a six-all draw. He played in the subsequent test at Newlands in which he scored a try in the 11–6 win. He earned a third cap in the third match of the test series, at Ellis Park, which the Springboks won 19–6.

== Test history ==
No.	Opposition	Result (RSA 1st)	Position	Tries	Date	Venue
1.	British Lions	6–6	Flank		22 June 1968	Boet Erasmus, Port Elizabeth
2.	(British & Irish Lions) British Lions	11–6	Flank	1	13 July 1968	Newlands, Cape Town
3.	(British & Irish Lions) British Lions	19–6	Flank		27 July 1968	Ellis Park, Johannesburg

== See also ==
- List of South Africa national rugby union players – Springbok no. 425
- SA Rugby Player of the Year - 1978
