= Lakeside, Johannesburg =

Lakeside
- Location within Gauteng Location within South Africa
- Coordinates: 26°5′57″S 28°8′37″E
- Country: South Africa
- Province: Gauteng
- Municipality: City of Johannesburg

Area
  - Total: 0.72 km^{2} (0.28 sq mi)

Population (2011)
  - Total: 1,163
  - Density: 1,600/km^{2} (4,200/sq mi)

Racial makeup (2011)
  - White: 73.34%
  - Black African: 20.81%
  - Indian/Asian: 4.13%
  - Coloured: 1.55%
  - Other: 0.17%

First languages (2011)
  - English: 71.77%
  - Afrikaans: 9.72%
  - Zulu: 3.53%
  - Sotho: 3.27%
  - Other: 11.71%
- Time zone: UTC+2 (SAST)
- PO box: 1645

Lakeside is a suburb of Johannesburg, South Africa. It is located adjacent to Modderfontein in the City of Johannesburg Metropolitan Municipality.
