= Uli Schmidt =

South African rugby union player

- Born: Ulrich Louis Schmidt; 10 July 1961 (age 65) Pretoria, South Africa
- Height: 1.80 m (5 ft 11 in)
- Weight: 93 kg (205 lb; 14 st 9 lb)
- School: Hoërskool Hendrik Verwoerd
- University: University of Pretoria
- Notable relative: Louis Schmidt (father)

Rugby union career
- Position: Hooker
Provincial / State sides
Years	Team	Apps	(Points)
1986–1992	Blue Bulls	136	
1992–1994	Transvaal	34	
- Correct as of 11 August 2014
International career
Years	Team	Apps	(Points)
1986–1994	South Africa	17	(9)
- Correct as of 11 August 2014

Ulrich Louis Schmidt (also known as Uli Schmidt) (born 10 July 1961 in Pretoria, South Africa) is a former South African rugby union footballer. His usual position was at hooker, where he played for the Blue Bulls in the Currie Cup, and later the Golden Lions, as well as the national team, the Springboks. He later became a Springbok team doctor.

== Playing career ==
Schmidt made his international debut for the Springboks as a 24-year-old on 10 May 1986 in a test against the NZ Cavaliers, which the Springboks won 21 to 15 at Newlands. He played in three subsequent tests against the New Zealand side throughout that May as well. The next time he would be capped for the national side would be in 1989, when he played in two tests against a World Invitation side, both of which the Springboks won.

He was capped twice in 1992, playing at hooker in a test against the All Blacks, which the Springboks lost 24 to 27, as well as a test against the Wallabies, which South Africa also lost, 3 to 26. He was capped five times for South Africa in the subsequent season, playing two tests against France and a three test series against the Wallabies in Australia. He earned four caps in 1994, the year in which he played his last test for South Africa on 26 November at Cardiff Arms Park, in a victory over Wales.

On the field, he was known for rough, even violent play.

=== Test history ===
No.	Opposition	Result (SA 1st)	Position	Tries	Date	Venue
1.	New Zealand Cavaliers	21–15	Hooker		10 May 1986	Newlands, Cape Town
2.	New Zealand Cavaliers	18–19	Hooker		17 May 1986	Kings Park, Durban
3.	New Zealand Cavaliers	33–18	Hooker	1	24 May 1986	Loftus Versfeld, Pretoria
4.	New Zealand Cavaliers	24–10	Hooker		31 May 1986	Ellis Park, Johannesburg
5.	World XV	20–19	Hooker		26 August 1989	Newlands, Cape Town
6.	World XV	22–16	Hooker		2 September 1989	Ellis Park, Johannesburg
7.	New Zealand	24–27	Hooker		15 August 1992	Ellis Park, Johannesburg
8.	Australia	3–26	Hooker		22 August 1992	Newlands, Cape Town
9.	France	20–20	Hooker	1	26 June 1993	Kings Park, Durban
10.	France	17–18	Hooker		3 July 1993	Ellis Park, Johannesburg
11.	Australia	19–12	Hooker		31 July 1993	Sydney Football Stadium (SFG), Sydney
12.	Australia	20–28	Hooker		14 August 1993	Ballymore Stadium, Brisbane
13.	Australia	12–19	Hooker		21 August 1993	Sydney Football Stadium (SFG), Sydney
14.	Argentina	42–22	Hooker		8 October 1994	Boet Erasmus, Port Elizabeth
15.	Argentina	46–26	Hooker		15 October 1994	Ellis Park, Johannesburg
16.	Scotland	34–10	Hooker		19 November 1994	Murrayfield, Edinburgh
17.	Wales	20–12	Hooker		26 November 1994	Cardiff Arms Park, Cardiff

== Personal ==
He moved to Australia in 2006 with his wife and three daughters. He currently lives and works on the New South Wales Central Coast.

== Accolades ==
In 2000 he was inducted into the University of Pretoria Sport Hall of fame. Schmidt was named the SA Rugby player of the Year for 1990 and 1991.

== See also ==
- List of South Africa national rugby union players – Springbok no. 544
- SA Rugby Player of the Year - 1990, 1991
