= Bedfordview =

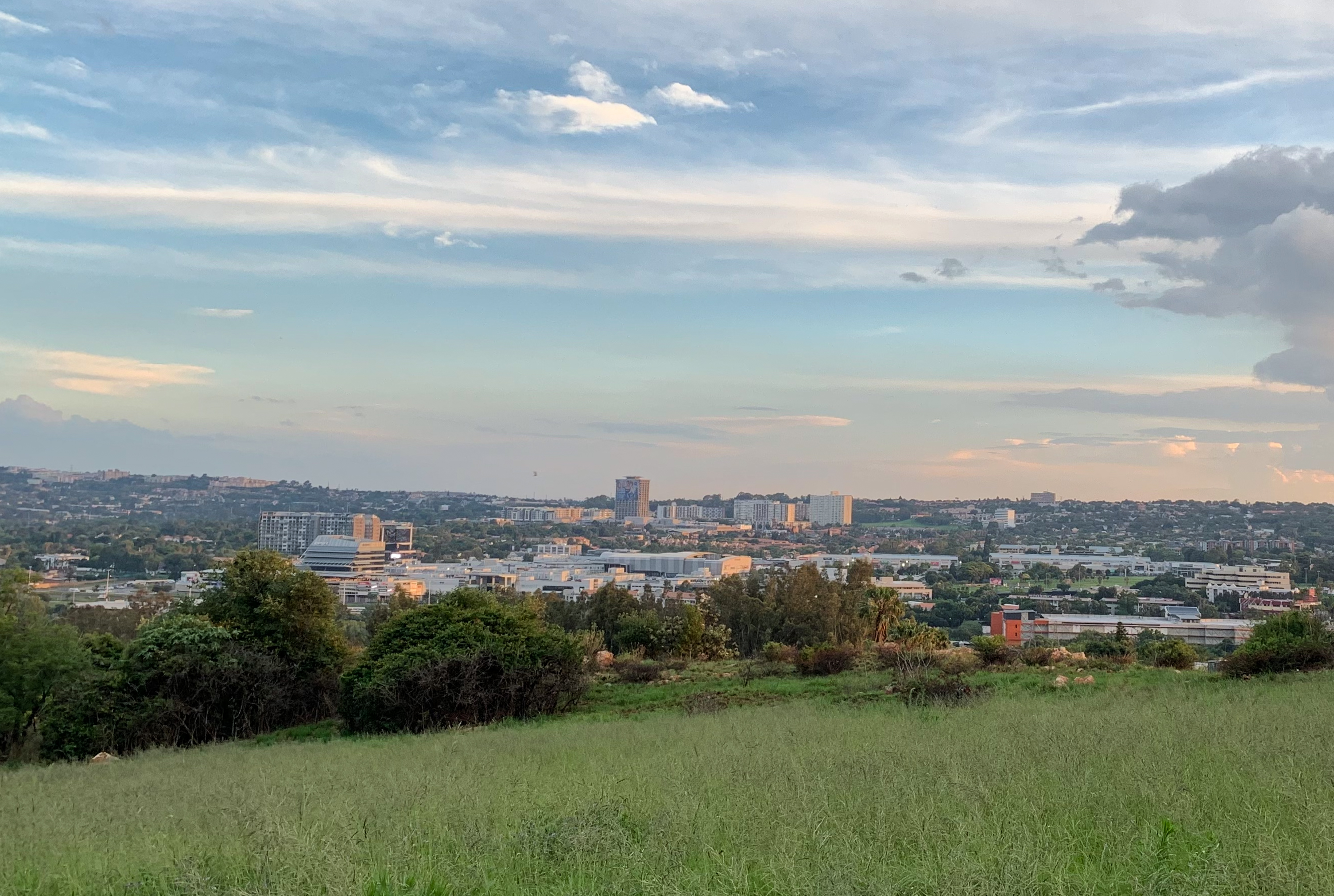
- Northern view on Bedfordview

- Location within Gauteng Location within South Africa Location within Africa
- Coordinates: 26°10′46″S 28°08′10″E
- Country: South Africa
- Province: Gauteng
- Municipality: Ekurhuleni
- Main Place: Germiston

Area
  - Total: 11.07 km^{2} (4.27 sq mi)
- Elevation: 1,639 m (5,377 ft)

Population (2011)
  - Total: 13,959
  - Density: 1,261/km^{2} (3,266/sq mi)

Racial makeup (2011)
  - Black African: 23.2%
  - Coloured: 1.7%
  - Indian/Asian: 7.7%
  - White: 63.9%
  - Other: 3.3%

First languages (2011)
  - English: 69.6%
  - Afrikaans: 7.5%
  - Zulu: 4.0%
  - Northern Sotho: 2.2%
  - Other: 16.6%
- Time zone: UTC+2 (SAST)
- Postal code (street): 2007
- PO box: 2008

Bedfordview is an affluent suburb in western Ekurhuleni, sharing an administrative boundary with the City of Johannesburg Metropolitan Municipality, Gauteng, South Africa. Bedfordview has been part of the City of Ekurhuleni Metropolitan Municipality since 2000. The Eastgate Shopping Centre, one of the biggest in Africa when first built, is also located here.

== History ==
The site of Bedfordview was largely taken up by the farm Elandsfontein, created in 1853 by Gerhardus van der Linden and was administered as part of the District of Potchefstroom in the South African Republic. The coat-of-arms of Bedfordview features an Eland holding a fountain as a tribute to the early rural history of the town.

The Witwatersrand Gold Reef had a huge impact on the area. Elandsfontein was purchased for the mineral rights, and was later divided into smaller farms and small-holdings, many of which were settled by retired miners. The entire area became known as Geldenhuis Estates Smallholdings.

One of these farms was owned by Sir George Herbert Farrar, a randlord who played a prominent role in planning the infamous Jameson Raid, one of the main causes of the Second Anglo-Boer War. His farm, Bedford, purchased in 1893, was located in the present-day suburb of St Andrews, and parts of the original farm can still be seen in St Andrews' School. The farm itself was named after Sir Farrar's home-town of Bedford in England. Apparently the raid itself was planned in a small house close to the farm. Sir George is buried on Milner Ave, close to the school, the only official grave in the town.

British cavalry was based in Bedfordview during the war and apparently planted the oak trees along Van Buuren Ave. There is also a legend that an Indian Rajah-based with the unit died and was buried somewhere in Bedfordview in full regalia, including his jewel-encrusted sword.

The name "Bedfordview" came about as the result of a competition. A young lady, Daisy Dollery, won the competition and thought there was a nice view from Bedford Farm. "Bedford View" (two words) was then registered. Over the years the name has contracted to one word. On 24 February 1926, the suburb officially obtained its name.

By 1932 the small-holding had developed into a small village. The 1st Bedfordview Scout Troop opened its doors on 26 July 1928, and there was a government school and a post office. However, there were major health concerns. Bill Stewart, the headmaster at the school, recalled that sewage would run down Van Buuren Road from Malvern East and that the piggeries and other farms caused swarms of flies. There was talk that the area should become part of a municipality in order to deal with the matter, and residents were asked whether they would prefer to join Johannesburg or Germiston. Joining a municipality would mean rates and taxes though, so the residents elected instead to set up a health committee to sort out the problem. This later developed into the Bedfordview Village Council and then the Bedfordview Town Council.

Bedfordview was joined with Germiston and Palm Ridge to form the Transitional Council of Greater Germiston, after the institutition of democracy. This was in turn merged with other East Rand towns to form the City of Ekurhuleni, which incorporated the old municipalities of Alberton, Bedfordview, Benoni, Boksburg, Brakpan, Edenvale, Germiston, Kempton Park, Nigel, and Springs.

== Listings ==
The site Bedfordview.co.za is a dedicated listing for business, malls, shops, jobs and property in the Bedfordview area.

== Economy ==
TAAG Angola Airlines has an office in Bedfordview.

Murray and Roberts has its head office in Bedfordview."

Securities and Trading Technology (STT) has its head office in Bedfordview."

Mochachos has its head office in Bedfordview."

== Suburbs ==
The following suburbs form part of Bedfordview:

- Bedford Gardens
- Bedford Park
- Essexwold
- Morninghill
- Oriel
- Senderwood (ex Johannesburg)
- St Andrews
- Malvern East Ext 1,3,7,9 (ex Germiston)

== Malls ==
- Eastgate Shopping Centre
- Bedford Centre

== Schools ==
- Bedfordview High School
- Bedfordview Primary School
- Bishop Bavin School
- Elandspark School
- Leeuwenhof Akademie
- New Crawford School
- Reddam House School
- SAHETI School
- St Andrew's School for Girls
- St Benedict's College

== Transport ==
Bedfordview is located at the interchange between the N3, N12 and R24 highways named the George Bizos Interchange (previously Gilooly’s Interchange). The N3 connects Germiston and Durban to the south with Sandton and Midrand to the north; the N12 connects Boksburg and eMalahleni to the east with Soweto and Potchefstroom to the west; and the R24 connects Johannesburg to the west with Edenvale and Kempton Park (including O.R. Tambo International Airport) to the north-east.

The main route through the Bedfordview central business district (CBD) is Van Buuren Road (M52) which connects Bedfordview to the neighbouring suburbs of Wilbart and Wychwood.

== Notable residents ==
- Janet Semple, former MPL and senior Democratic Alliance politician
- Johnny Clegg, singer-songwriter
