= Kevin de Klerk =

South African rugby union footballer

- Born: Kevin Brian Henry de Klerk; 6 June 1950 (age 76) Johannesburg, South Africa
- Height: 1.98 m (6 ft 6 in)
- Weight: 111 kg (245 lb)
- School: Hill High School, Johannesburg

Rugby union career
- Position: Lock
Amateur team(s)
Years	Team	Apps	(Points)
- Glenwood Old Boys
Provincial / State sides
Years	Team	Apps	(Points)
1971–78, 80–84	Transvaal	108	
1979	Natal		
International career
Years	Team	Apps	(Points)
1974–81	South Africa	13	(0)

Kevin Brian Henry de Klerk (born 6 June 1950 in Johannesburg, South Africa) is a former South African rugby union player.

== Playing career ==
=== Youth and Provincial career ===
De Klerk started his rugby career with Transvaal when he was picked to represent the Transvaal schools team at the annual Craven Week tournament in 1968. De Klerk was again selected for the Schools team in 1969. His playing career with Transvaal continued after school, when he was selected for the under-20 age group team. De Klerk made his provincial first team debut for Transvaal in 1971.

=== International career ===
De Klerk made his test debut for the Springboks on 8 June 1974 at Newlands in Cape Town against the touring British Lions team, captained by Willie John McBride. De Klerk played in the second test in the series against the British Lions, but was dropped for the third test and replaced by Moaner van Heerden. In subsequent years it was often a choice between de Klerk and Van Heerden for the number 4 lock position in the Springbok team.

Following the 1974 test series against the British Lions, de Klerk also represent the Springboks against the, 1975 French touring team, the 1976 All Blacks, the 1980 South American Jaguars and British Lions, and the 1981 Irish touring team. De Klerk's last test match was against Ireland on his 31st birthday, 6 June 1981 at Kings Park Stadium, Durban. De Klerk played 13 test matches for the Springboks.

=== Test history ===
No.	Opposition	Result (SA 1st)	Position	Tries	Date	Venue
1.	British Lions	3–12	Lock		8 June 1974	Newlands, Cape Town
2.	(British & Irish Lions) British Lions	9–28	Lock		22 June 1974	Loftus Versfeld, Pretoria
3.	(British & Irish Lions) British Lions	9–26	Reserve		13 July 1974	Boet Erasmus Stadium, Port Elizabeth
4.	France	38–25	Lock		21 June 1975	Free State Stadium, Bloemfontein
5.	France	33–18	Lock		28 June 1975	Loftus Versveld, Pretoria
6.	New Zealand	9–15	Reserve		14 August 1976	Free State Stadium, Bloemfontein
7.	New Zealand	15–10	Lock		4 September 1976	Newlands, Cape Town
8.	New Zealand	15–14	Lock		18 September 1976	Ellis Park Stadium, Johannesburg
9.	South American Jaguars	24–9	Lock		26 April 1980	Wanderers Stadium, Johannesburg
10.	South American Jaguars	18–9	Lock		3 May 1980	Kings Park Stadium, Durban
11.	(British & Irish Lions) British Lions	26–19	Lock		14 June 1980	Free State Stadium, Bloemfontein
12.	Ireland	23–15	Lock		30 May 1981	Newlands, Cape Town
13.	Ireland	12–10	Lock		6 June 1981	Kings Park Stadium, Durban

== Accolades ==
De Klerk was named one of the five SA Rugby players of the Year for 1972. The four other players named, were two members of the 1972 England team that toured South Africa, namely Sam Doble and John Pullin, as well as the South African flanker Jan Ellis and future Springbok Carel Fourie.

== Rugby administration ==
Since his playing days and from 2000, De Klerk has served in various executive capacities with the Golden Lions Rugby Union, the Lions Rugby Company (Pty) Ltd. and Ellis Park Stadium (Pty) Ltd. He was elected president of the Golden Lions Rugby Union in July 2009 and held this position until his retirement in August 2018.

== See also ==
- List of South Africa national rugby union players – Springbok no. 464
