= M93 (Johannesburg) =

Metropolitan route in the City of Ekurhuleni, South Africa

Metropolitan route M93

Route information
- Maintained by Johannesburg Roads Agency and Gauteng Department of Roads and Transport

Major junctions
- Northwest end: M2
- Southeast end: M37

Location
- Country: South Africa

Highway system
- Numbered routes of South Africa
← M92	→ M94

The M93 is a short metropolitan route in the Greater Johannesburg, South Africa. It consists of only one street (Refinery Road) in the city of Germiston.

== Route ==
The M93 begins at the M2 and ends at the M37.
