= Alastair MacGregor Martin =

Chile international rugby union player

Alastair MacGregor
- Born: Alastair MacGregor Martin; June 30, 1954 (age 72)
- School: The Mackay School

Rugby union career
- Position: No. 8
International career
Years	Team	Apps	(Points)
1977-1980s	Chile		
1980	South American Jaguars		
1980	World XV		

Alastair MacGregor Martin (born 30 June 1954) is a former rugby union international who represented Chile in the late 1970s and early 1980s. He was noted as one of the finest players in Chile and as such was selected to play for a World XV against Argentina in 1980.

== Early life ==
Alastair MacGregor Martin was born on 30 June 1954 and attended The Mackay School in Chile.

== Rugby career ==
Alastair MacGregor Martin played his club rugby for his school's old boys club, the Old Mackayans Rugby Football Club, and led them to national cup wins on 1978, 1981 and 1982.

For Chile, he first faced the Pumas in 1977 and by 1979 was captain of his national side. He was also part of the 1980 South American Jaguars side that toured South Africa. Notably, in 1980 he also played for a World XV on 9 August 1980 against Argentina in Buenos Aires, losing 36-22. alongside John Scott and Jean-Pierre Rives.

In 2009 he became the president of the Federación de Rugby de Chile (FERUCHI) replacing Carlos Silva Echiburu. This was in response to what was described as a messy institutional period, when the Chilean rugby chiefs looked to one of the countries former rugby greats to lead the new road.

== Career ==
Alastair MacGregor Martin is an engineer by profession.
