= Dave Frederickson (rugby union) =

South African rugby union footballer

- Born: Cornelius Abraham Frederickson; 17 August 1950 (age 76) Lichtenburg, North West, South Africa
- Height: 1.85 m (6 ft 1 in)
- Weight: 102 kg (225 lb)
- School: Bekker High School, Magaliesburg

Rugby union career
Amateur team(s)
Years	Team	Apps	(Points)
- Rand Leases
Provincial / State sides
Years	Team	Apps	(Points)
1973	Transvaal		
International career
Years	Team	Apps	(Points)
1974–1980	South Africa	3	

Cornelius Abraham "Dave" Frederickson (born 17 August 1950 in Lichtenburg, North West, South Africa) is a former South African rugby union player.

== Playing career ==
Frederickson played for the Transvaal Schools team at the 1968 Craven Week tournament and at age group level played for the Transvaal under–20 team and he also represented Western Province at under–20 level.

Frederickson made his international debut for the Springboks in the second test against the visiting British Lions on 22 June 1974, at Loftus Versfeld, Pretoria. Frederickson played a further two tests for the Springboks, the last being against the touring South American Jaguars on 3 May 1980 at Kings Park Stadium, Durban.

=== Test history ===
No.	Opposition	Result (SA 1st)	Position	Tries	Date	Venue
1.	British Lions	9–28	Hooker		22 June 1974	Loftus Versfeld, Pretoria
2.	South American Jaguars	24–9	Hooker		26 April 1980	Wanderers Stadium, Johannesburg
3.	South American Jaguars	18–9	Hooker		3 May 1980	Kings Park Stadium, Durban

== See also ==
- List of South Africa national rugby union players – Springbok no. 469
