= The Mackay School =

School in Valparaiso, Chile

Coordinates: 33°58′25″S 71°32′10″W

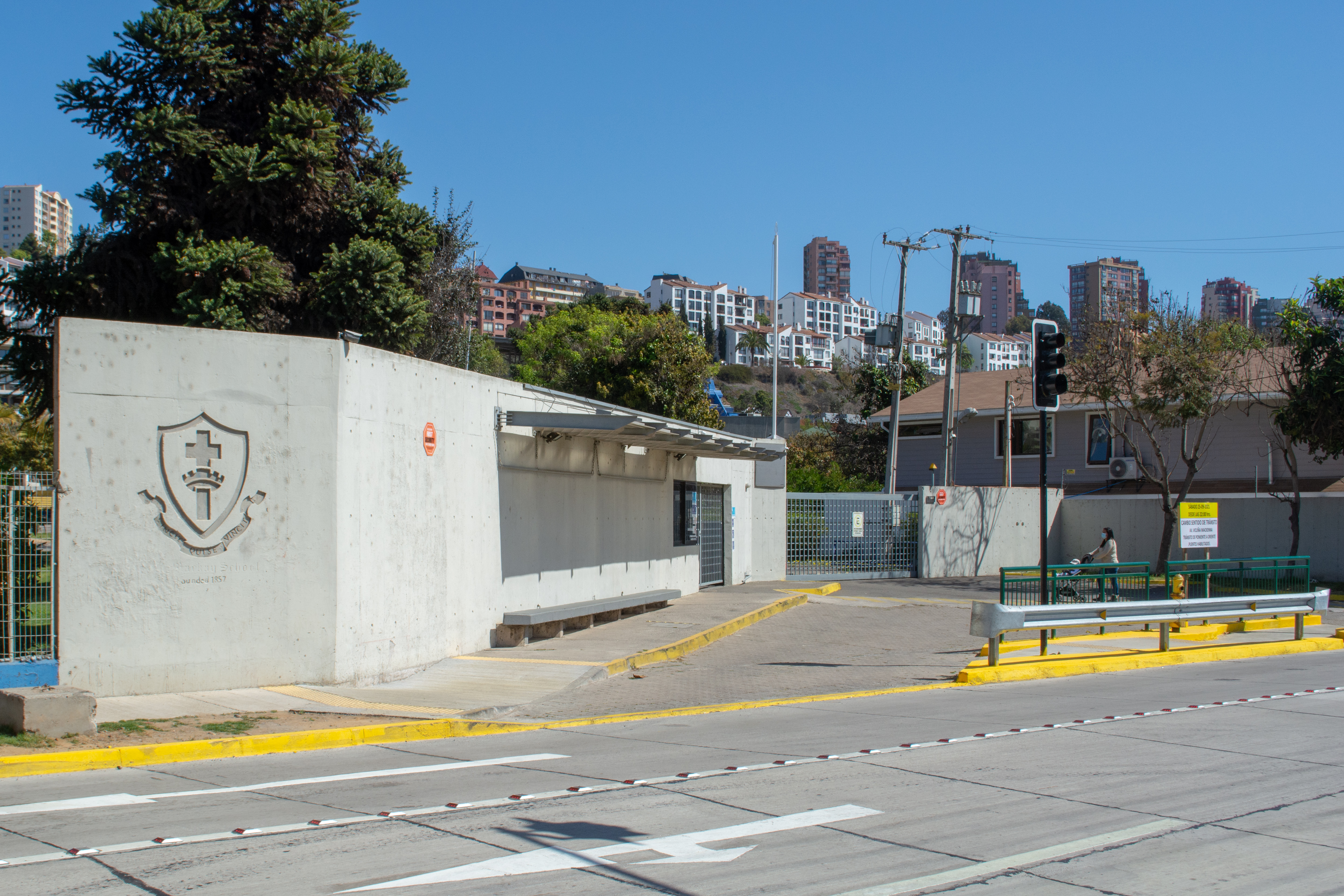

The Mackay School a Chilean school located in Reñaca, Region of Valparaiso, Chile. It was founded in 1857 by Scottish immigrants. It is considered one of the best academic institutions in the Valparaíso Region. Currently it only educates male students.

== History ==
The Mackay School was founded in 1857 by Peter Mackay as The Valparaíso Artizan School, with the aim to make available quality education for the children of English, American and especially Scottish craftsmen of limited resources who worked in the factories and railroads of Valparaíso during the middle of the 19th century.

The school was first located in the Cerro Alegre area of Valparaíso. One of the founders of the school was Scot Peter Mackay, who was also the first headmaster. The school had a spectacular welcome, showing why more teachers were needed. One that arrived to reinforce Mackay was George Sutherland. By 1866, the institution counted with more than 140 students. Another educator that arrived was Thomas Somerscales, who was contracted as an arts teacher. Until then, only students who spoke English were accepted. But this tradition would be broken in 1871, when opening the first course for Chilean children who did not speak the English language.

== Others ==
The purpose of creating the school was to provide a suitable education for the children of the English, the American and especially for those of the Scottish craftsmen who worked in the railway workshops in Valparaíso during the midst of the 19th century. In response to this, The Valparaíso Artizian School Society was organised.

Peter Mackay, a teacher in Glasgow, Scotland, accepted the post of headmaster and moved to Valparaíso, arriving on 8 October 1857. As the school grew in number, an assistant teacher was required. Mr. George Sutherland arrived at Valparaíso from the Moray House Training College, Edinburgh.

In 1866, the school's average student body number was 180. Mr. Thomas Somerscales was hired as an arts teacher and he taught for almost 20 years. Parallel to his job at the school, he taught private lessons for painting and drawing. It was not until 1871 that the first class for Chilean students, with no knowledge of English, was opened.

== Notable alumni ==
- Edmundo González Robles, Former Commander in Chief of the Chilean Navy
- Alastair MacGregor Martin, rugby union international, captain of Chile and member of 1980 World XV.
- Nicolás Alejandro Massú Fried, Former professional tennis player, two-time Olimpic gold medal winner.
- Carlos van Buren, Chilean philanthropist, banker and businessman.
- Osvaldo "El Gitano" Rodriguez, Chilean troubadour, poet and essayist.
- Mario Salas, Chilean former soccer player, physical education teacher and soccer coach.
- Jorge Arrate, Chilean lawyer, economist, writer and politician. He was minister of state on multiple occasions and candidate for the presidency of Chile in 2009.
- Martín Cárcamo, Chilean television presenter, actor and host of the Festival de Viña del Mar.
- Eduardo de la Iglesia, actor and television presenter.
- José Miguel Benavente Hormazabal, Chilean industrial engineer and Oxford-trained PhD economist, currently Vice President of CORFO, appointed under President Gabriel Boric.
