= Janet Semple =

South African politician

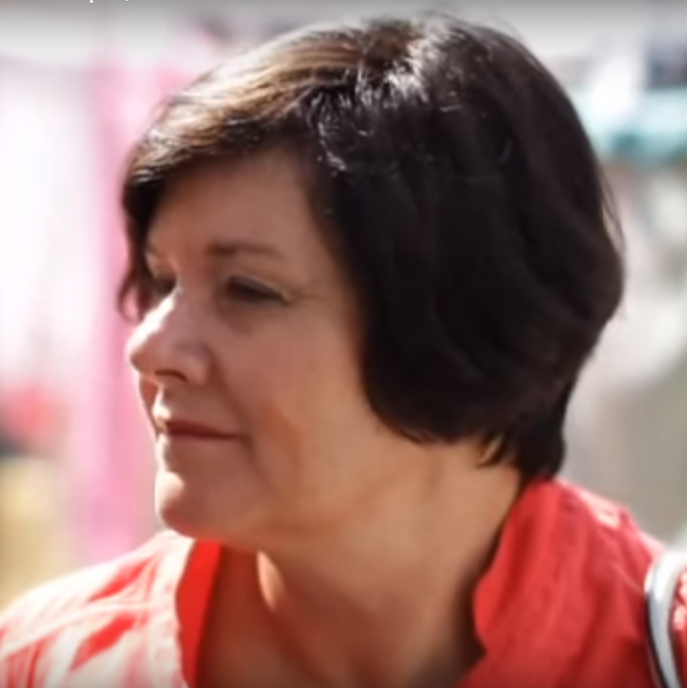

Leader of the Democratic Alliance in Gauteng
- In office 18 April 2010 – 10 March 2012
- Preceded by: John Moodey
- Succeeded by: John Moodey

Member of the Gauteng Provincial Legislature
- In office 19 October 2010 – 7 May 2019

Member of the National Assembly of South Africa
- In office 14 June 1999 – 21 April 2009

Personal details
- Born: 29 March 1955 (age 71)
- Citizenship: South Africa
- Party: Democratic Alliance

Janet Audrey Semple (born 29 March 1955) is a retired South African politician who served as a Member of the Gauteng Provincial Legislature for the Democratic Alliance (DA) from 2010 to 2019. She was the Provincial Leader of the DA in Gauteng from 2010 to 2012. She previously represented the DA and Democratic Party (DP) in the National Assembly from 1999 to 2009.

== Early life and career ==
Semple was born on 29 March 1955. She started her political career by serving as both the mayor and deputy mayor of Bedfordview. She was a member of the Women's National Coalition.

== Parliament ==
Semple joined the National Assembly in the 1999 general election, representing the DP, and stood successfully for re-election in 2004, ranked fourth on the Gauteng party list of the DA, the DP's successor party. She was also Chairperson of the Democratic Alliance's Women Network from 2005 to 2009 and the DA's political head in Benoni. She left Parliament after the 2009 general election.

== Provincial legislature ==
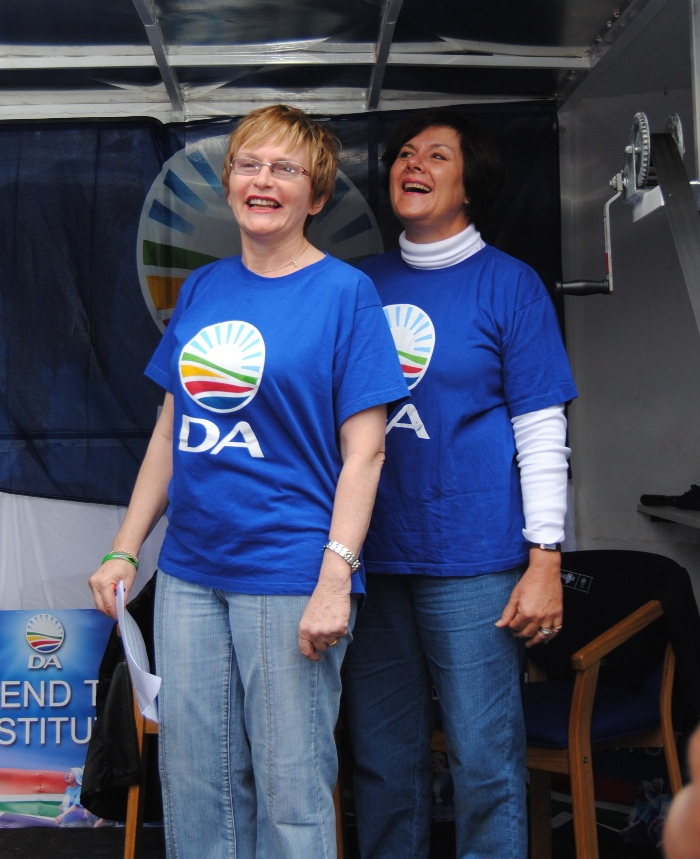
Semple and DA Leader Helen Zille

Semple was elected the Provincial Leader of the Democratic Alliance in April 2010. She defeated incumbent John Moodey by just 8 votes. She was soon appointed to the Gauteng Provincial Legislature in October 2010. She became the party's provincial spokesperson on Housing and the party's head in Boksburg.

Semple announced her retirement as the provincial leader in January 2012. Her predecessor, John Moodey, was elected as her successor at the party's March 2012 conference.

She left the Gauteng Provincial Legislature at the May 2019 general election.

Party political offices
Preceded by John Moodey	Provincial Leader of the Gauteng Democratic Alliance; 2010–2012	Succeeded by John Moodey
