= Johan Strauss (rugby union) =

South African rugby union footballer

- Born: Johan Hendrik Potgieter Strauss; 27 September 1951 (age 75) Alberton, Gauteng, South Africa
- Height: 1.80 m (5 ft 11 in)
- Weight: 99 kg (218 lb)
- School: Bekker High School, Magaliesburg

Rugby union career
Provincial / State sides
Years	Team	Apps	(Points)
1972	Transvaal	108	
International career
Years	Team	Apps	(Points)
1976–1980	South Africa	3	

Johan Hendrik Potgieter Strauss (born 27 September 1951 in Alberton, Gauteng, South Africa) is a former South African rugby union player.

== Playing career ==
Strauss played for Transvaal and the Springboks. He made his international debut in the third test against the visiting All Blacks on 4 September 1976, at Newlands, Cape Town. Strauss played a further two tests for the Springboks, the last being against the touring South American Jaguars on 26 April 1980 at the Wanderers Stadium, Johannesburg.

=== Test history ===
No.	Opposition	Result (SA 1st)	Position	Tries	Date	Venue
1.	New Zealand	15–10	Tighthead prop		4 Sep 1976	Newlands, Cape Town
2.	New Zealand	15–14	Tighthead prop		18 Sep 1976	Ellis Park Stadium, Johannesburg
3.	South American Jaguars	24–9	Tighthead prop		26 Apr 1980	Wanderers Stadium, Johannesburg

== See also ==
- List of South Africa national rugby union players – Springbok no. 490
