= Peter Whipp =

South African rugby union player

- Born: Peter John Milton Whipp; 22 September 1950 (age 76) East London, Eastern Cape
- Height: 1.80 m (5 ft 11 in)
- Weight: 81 kg (179 lb)
- School: Diocesan College
- University: University of Cape Town

Rugby union career
- Position: Centre
Amateur team(s)
Years	Team	Apps	(Points)
- Ikeys
–	Villager FC		
Provincial / State sides
Years	Team	Apps	(Points)
1971–81	Western Province	71	(120)
International career
Years	Team	Apps	(Points)
1974–80	South Africa	8	(4)
- Correct as of 29 July 2008

Peter John Milton Whipp (born 22 September 1950) was a South African rugby union player.

== Playing career ==
Whipp made his provincial debut for Western Province in the Currie Cup match against South Western Districts at Mossel Bay in 1971. He went on to gain 71 caps over a ten-year period for Western Province.

He made his international debut on 8 June 1974 against the British Lions on his home ground of Newlands in Cape Town. He played eight test matches and scored his only international try against France on 21 June 1975 in Bloemfontein. Whipp also played in two tour matches for the Springboks. His career was brought to a premature end in 1981 when he suffered a severe injury.

=== Test history ===
No.	Opposition	Result (SA 1st)	Position	Tries	Date	Venue
1.	British Lions	3–12	Centre		8 Jun 1974	Newlands, Cape Town
2.	(British & Irish Lions) British Lions	9–28	Centre		22 Jun 1974	Loftus Versfeld, Pretoria
3.	France	38–25	Centre	1	21 Jun 1975	Free State Stadium, Bloemfontein
4.	New Zealand	16–7	Centre		24 Jul 1976	Kings Park Stadium, Durban
5.	New Zealand	15–10	Centre		4 Sep 1976	Newlands, Cape Town
6.	New Zealand	15–14	Centre		18 Sep 1976	Ellis Park, Johannesburg
7.	South American Jaguars	24–9	Centre		26 Apr 1980	Wanderers Stadium, Johannesburg
8.	South American Jaguars	18–9	Centre		3 May 1980	Kings Park Stadium, Durban

== See also ==
- List of South Africa national rugby union players – Springbok no. 459
