= M49 (Johannesburg) =

Metropolitan route in Greater Johannesburg, South Africa

Metropolitan route M49

Route information
- Maintained by Johannesburg Roads Agency and Gauteng Department of Roads and Transport

Major junctions
- North end: M53

- South end: M37

Location
- Country: South Africa

Highway system
- Numbered routes of South Africa
← M48	→ M52

The M49 is a short metropolitan route in Greater Johannesburg, South Africa.

== Route ==
The M49 begins at the M53 and ends at the M37.
