= M94 (Johannesburg) =

Metropolitan route in Greater Johannesburg, South Africa

Metropolitan route M94

Route information
- Maintained by Johannesburg Roads Agency and Gauteng Department of Roads and Transport

Major junctions
- East end: M48

- West end: M35

Location
- Country: South Africa

Highway system
- Numbered routes of South Africa
← M93	→ M95

The M94 is a short metropolitan route in Greater Johannesburg, South Africa.

== Route ==
The M94 begins at the M48 and ends at the M35.
