= M48 (Johannesburg) =

Metropolitan route in Greater Johannesburg, South Africa

Metropolitan route M48

Route information
- Maintained by Johannesburg Roads Agency and Gauteng Department of Roads and Transport

Major junctions
- North end: M31 Florentia
- South end: M47 Webber

Location
- Country: South Africa

Highway system
- Numbered routes of South Africa
← M47	→ M49

The M48 is a short metropolitan route in Greater Johannesburg, South Africa.

== Route ==
The M48 begins at the M31 and ends at the M47.
