= Malvern, Johannesburg =

Malvern
- Location within Gauteng Location within South Africa
- Coordinates: 26.201°S 28.102°E
- Country: South Africa
- Province: Gauteng
- Municipality: City of Johannesburg
- Main Place: Johannesburg
- Established: 1904

Area
  - Total: 1.62 km^{2} (0.63 sq mi)

Population (2011)
  - Total: 10,525
  - Density: 6,500/km^{2} (16,800/sq mi)

Racial makeup (2011)
  - Black African: 86.0%
  - Coloured: 6.3%
  - Indian/Asian: 1.4%
  - White: 5.6%
  - Other: 0.7%

First languages (2011)
  - Zulu: 39.7%
  - English: 19.2%
  - Afrikaans: 5.9%
  - Xhosa: 5.8%
  - Other: 29.3%
- Time zone: UTC+2 (SAST)
- Postal code (street): 2094
- PO box: 2094

Malvern is a suburb of Johannesburg, South Africa. Situated east of the Johannesburg CBD, it lies south of Kensington and north of the industrial suburb of Denver. It is located in Region F of the City of Johannesburg Metropolitan Municipality and lies just west of Bedfordview in the City of Ekurhuleni Metropolitan Municipality.

== History ==
Prior to the discovery of gold on the Witwatersrand in 1886, the suburb lay on land on one of the original farms that make up Johannesburg, called Doornfontein. The area is named after Malvern or Malvern Hills in Worcestershire with the land proclaimed as a suburb on 24 June 1904. It was previously called Morriston.
