= Greenstone Hill =

- Location within Gauteng Location within South Africa
- Coordinates: 26.118°S 28.156°E
- Country: South Africa
- Province: Gauteng
- Municipality: City of Johannesburg

Area
  - Total: 2.02 km^{2} (0.78 sq mi)

Population (2011)
  - Total: 6,122
  - Density: 3,030/km^{2} (7,850/sq mi)

Racial makeup (2011)
  - Black African: 29.3%
  - Coloured: 3.2%
  - Indian/Asian: 17.8%
  - White: 48.1%
  - Other: 1.6%

First languages (2011)
  - English: 69.6%
  - Afrikaans: 10.7%
  - Zulu: 5.2%
  - Sotho: 2.5%
  - Other: 12.0%
- Time zone: UTC+2 (SAST)
- Postal code (street): 1609
- PO box: 1609

Greenstone Hill is a suburb on the East Rand in the City of Johannesburg Metropolitan Municipality in the Gauteng province of South Africa. It is between Edenvale to the south and Modderfontein to the north.

== Transport ==
Greenstone Hill, along with its neighboring town of Edenvale, is near four major roads — the N3 freeway (Johannesburg Eastern Bypass), the R24 freeway (which runs from Johannesburg city centre to O. R. Tambo International Airport), the Modderfontein Road (R25), and the N12 highway.

=== Public transport ===
The Gautrain rapid rail line passes to the east and the north of Greenstone Hill and the closest stations are Rhodesfield and Marlboro. As of October 2018, a midibus service links Greenstone Hill to Marlboro station with buses every 30 minutes during peak times and every hour during off-peak times.

== Businesses ==
Greenstone Hill is also the location of the Greenstone Shopping Mall, which was opened in 2007. Expansions of this mall and the nearby Stoneridge Centre, along with other smaller shopping center's such as Eden-Meadows, Greenstone Crescent, and Stoneridge Centre has made Greenstone Hill a big drawcard for shoppers and entertainment seekers from all over the city.

The nearby Longmeadow Business Park has made Greenstone Hill a convenient place to purchase residential property and as a result, a lot of residential development has been constructed or is still under construction here. These properties are mostly in the form of town houses and apartments within a Body Corporate, but there are also many free standing houses within residential estates. A three-bedroom, two-bathroom town house can be purchased for around R1 550 000 (approx. US$110,000). The free standing house can be purchased from R2 800 000 up to R6 000 000 (approx. $200k - $428k).

== Lifestyle living ==
The population of Greenstone Hill is generally younger, typically persons who have recently left home or those who have young families. A typical townhouse or apartment complex ranges from 600 to 1100 units where these apartments offer renters or homeowners options from 1 bedroom-1 bathroom through to 3 bedroom-2 bathroom variations. Free standing houses are situated within the 5 residential estates (Thorn Valley Estate, Bushwillow Park Estate, Emerald Estate, Pebble Creek Estate and Waterstone Park Estate). All of which are considered to be a very secure living option. Although the square kilometre radius of Greenstone Hill may seem quite small when compared to the neighbouring suburbs, there is a sense of luxury living associated with the area hence a high level of affluent residents and property investors are found in the area. Greenstone Hill seems to portray a fairly decent active lifestyle where a large contingency of joggers and cyclists are noticeable, this is over and above the advent of a number of gyms and crossfit boxes opening up within the area.
