= 1971 Argentina rugby union tour of South Africa =

Summary
P	W	D	L
Total
14	9	1	4
Test match
2	1	0	1
Opponent
P	W	D	L
Gazelles
2	1	0	1

The 1971 Argentina rugby union tour of South Africa was a series of 14 matches played by the Argentina national rugby union team in June and July 1971.

It was the second tour of Argentinian team in South Africa, six year after the 1965 tour .

The "Pumas" didn't play against Springboks (playing meanwhile in Australia, but against the Gazelles, the selection of emerging young players.

Originally was scheduled also a match in Rhodesia, but it was cancelled after a prohibition of Argentine government.

== Matches ==
26 June 1971

South Est Transvaal	3 - 21	Argentina XV
		Try: M.Pascual, D.Morgan, G.Blacksley, B.Otaño; Con: H.Méndez 3 Pen: H.Méndez

Witbank
Referee: Roberts (South Africa)

South East Transvall: M.de Pager; B.Strydom, J.Killitan, S.Breytenbach, K.Ferreira; K.Nel, J.Van Zyl; O.Du Preez, L.Luus, J.de Lange; L.Van der Merwe, K.Venter; S.Du Tand, H.Steenkamp (capt.), J.Taljaard.
Argentina:D.Morgan; M.Pascual, R.Matarazzo, A.Travaglini, M.Walther; H.Méndez, G.Blacksley; R.Foster, R.Handley, L.García Yáñez; B.Otaño, A.Anthony; M.Morgan, H.Silva (capt.), N.Carbone.

30 June 1971

East.Orange Free State	0 - 26	Argentina XV
		Try: M.Pascual 2, T.Harris-Smith, N.Carbone, Con: D.Margan; Pen: D.Morgan, H.Méndez; Drop: T.Harris Smith 2

Bethlehem
Referee: Cas de Bruyn (South Africa)

Eastern Orange Free State: G.Kotze: M.Van Rensburg, K.Wessel, P.Pultney, J.Visagie; D.Fourie, Pultney; R.Simes, J.Mintz, T.Human; G.Jordany K.Scheespers; C.Betern, J.Bell, T.Lyell.
Argentina:D.Morgan; M.Pascual, J.Walther, A.Travaglini, M.Walther, H.Méndez, A.Etchegaray; R.Foster, R.Handley, H.Incola: N.Carbone, B.Otaño; A.Anthony, H.Silva (capt.), J.Wittman.

3 July 1971

Northern Universities	20 - 14	Argentina XV
Try: Ch.Parker, A.Millar, D.Gradwell; Con: D.Gradwell; Pen: D.Gradwell 3		Try: E.Morgan, Con: D.Morgan; Pen: D.Morgan 2, T.Harris-Smith

Ellis Park, Johannesburg
Referee: Moolman (South Africa)

Northern Universities: O.de Meyer; A.Millar, D.van Wyk, B.Grace, Ch.Parker; D.Gradwell, J.Osthuizen; R.Portgieter, K.Resnick (capt.), N.Bezuidenbout; P.Bezuidenbout, T.Bernard; P.Du Pleussis, J.Stofberg, B.Bernardo.
Argentina:D.Morgan; E.Morgan, A.Rodríguez Jurado, A.Travaglini, M.Walther; T.Harris-Smith, A.Etchegaray; R.Foster, R.Handley, L.García Yáñez; A.Anthony B.Otaño; N.Carbone, H.Silva (capt.), M.Morgan.

7 July 1971

SA Colleges	13 - 18	Argentina XV
Try: J.De Vos 2 C.Classen; Con: J.Sauerman 2		Try: A.Rodríguez Jurado 2, J.Walther; Pen: R.Espagnol; Drop: R.Espagnol, T.Harris-Smith

Olen Park, Potchefstroom
Referee: Bert Wooley (South Africa)

South African Colleges: J.Sauerman; G.Germisius, J.Croftd-Jones, J.de Vos, Jan Pretorius; C.Classen, B.Wolmarans; R.van der Merwe, J.Wagenaer, R.Marchant; C.Knoetze, P.Clarke; J.Joubert, J.Kleingeld, M.Kocket.
Argentina:R.Espagnol; M.Pascual, A.Rodríguez Jurado, J.Walther, A.Travaglini; T.Harris-Smith, G.Blaksley; H.Incola, J.Constante, R.Foster, A.Anthony, B.Otaño; H.Miguens, H.Silva (capt.), J.Wittman.

10 July 1971

Natal	6 - 11	Argentina XV
Try: Greyling; Drop: M.Swanby		Try: A.Travaglini; Con: R.Espagnol; Pen: A.Travaglini 2

Durban
Referee: W.Lane (South Africa)

Natal: M.Swanby; R.Pitcher, R.Greyling, P.de Lange, M.Warner; T.Mehrtens, C.Hola; T. Dannahauser, J.Krotzingery R.Steyn (capt.); M.Van Rensburg, M.Mckenzie; F.Jackson, S.Labuschagno, D.Van der Berg.
Argentina:D.Morgan; M.Pascual, R.Matarazzo, A.Travaglini, J.Walther; R.Espagnol, G.Blaksley; J.Wittman, H.Silva (capt.), N.Carbone; A.Anthony, B.Otaño; R.Foster, R.Handley, H.Incola.

14 July 1971

Northern Orange Free State	16 - 23	Argentina XV
Try: Armes, F.Aucamp, W.Potgieter; Con: F.Froneman 2 Pen: F.Froneman		Try: R.Matarazzo, Con: R.Espagnol; Pen: R.Espagnol 4 Drop: R.Espagnok, A.Etchegaray

Welkom
Referee: Max Baise (South Africa)

Northern Orange Free State: J.Louw; F.Aucamp; B.Harris, D.Boytma, W.Armes; F.Froneman; J.van Eevter; H.Boerseun Roux, W.Potgieter; E.Kapp, J.Vandenberg; H.Fourie.B.Colette, J.Tredoux.
Argentina:D.Morgan; M.Pascual, J.Walther, R.Matarazzo, E.Morgan; R.Espagnol y a.Etchegaray; M.Morgan, H.Silva (capt.), J.Wittman; A.Anthony, J.Fernández; A.Orzábal, R. Handley, L.García Yáñez

17 July 1971

SA Gazelles (South Africa)	12 - 6	Argentina
Try: B.Swartz, C.Holm; Pen: J.Van Deventer; Drop: J.Van Deventer		Pen: R.Espagnol 2

Port Elizabeth
Referee: Cas de Bruyn (South Africa)

Gazelles: J.van Deventer; T.Du Toit, A.Swartz, A.van Staden, L.Vogel; J.Barnard, C.Hola; B.Neetling, J.Wagenaar, R.Potgieter; J.Jamneck, J.van Aswegen; M.van Resnburg, P.vanDeventer, C.Grobler.
Argentina:D.Morgan; M.Pascual, R.Matarazzo, A.Rodríguez Jurado, A.Travaglini; R.Espagnol, G.Blaksley; H.Silva (capt.), J.Wittman, N.Carbone; B.Otaño, A.Anthony; R.Foster, R.Handley, L.García Yáñez.

21 July 1971

South West Districts	11 - 17	Argentina XV
Try: L.Du Toit; Con: G.de Kok; Pen: G.de Kok 2		Try: M.Walther, A.Rodríguez Jurado 2, H.Silva; Con: H.Silva; Pen: T.Harris-Smith

Mossel Bay
Referee: A.Malan (South Africa)

South Western Districts: G.Kok; J.Bester, F.Stander, F.van Zyl, H.Faricius; S.de Oplesis, S.Bradley; P.Carstens, H.Vester, L.Du Toit; T.van der Westhuizen, J.Swec, C.Pretorius, S.Jonker.
Argentina:D.Morgan; M.Walther, A.Travaglini, A.Rodríguez Jurado, M.Pascual; T.Harris-Smith, A.Etchegaray; R.Foster, J.Constante, H.Incola; M.Morgan, B.Otaño; L.García Yáñez, H.Silva (capt.), J.Wittman.

24 July 1971

South Africa Country District	0 - 16	Argentina XV
		Try: H.Silva, M.Morgan, R.Matarazzo; Con: T.Harris-Smith 2 Drop: T.Harris-Smith

Wellington, Western Cape
Referee: Roberts (South Africa)

South Africa CD: A.Joubet; O.Fourie, B.Swartz, K.Walkdeck, P.Ackerman; L.Gerber, F.Duplessis; D.van der Merwe, D.Slabbert, D.Coleshan; B.Stander, K.Engelbrecht; J.Kritzinger, B.Jamneck, D.Vorster.
Argentina:D.Morgan; M.Pascual, A.Travaglini, A.Rodríguez Jurado, M.Walther; T.Harris-Smith, A.Etchegaray; H.Silva (capt.), M.Morgan, J.Wittman; A.Anthony, B.Otaño; R.Foster, R.Handley, L.García Yáñez.

28 July 1971

Southern Universities	12 - 9	Argentina XV
Try: F. Burger; Pen: J. Snyman 3		Try: M. Pascual; Pen: T. Harris-Smith 2

Cape Town
Referee: B.Calita (South Africa)

Southern Universities: R.Carlson; P.Berning, J.Snyman, J.van der Merwe, J.Engelbrecht (capt.); J.Nel, F.de Villiers; R.Bryant, B.Butler, R.Stader; J.Le Roux, G.Watt; F.Burger, B.Cohetes, P.Le Roux.
Argentina:D.Morgan; M.Pascual, A.Travaglini, J.Walther, M.Walther; T.Harris-Smith, A.Etchegaray, H.Silva (capt.), M.Morgan, J.Wittman; A.Anthony, B.Otaño; R.Foster, R.Handley, L.García Yáñez

31 July 1971

North West Cape	3 - 17	Argentina XV
Pen: B.Young		Try: J.Walther, R.Foster; Con: R.Espagnol; Pen: R.Espagnol; Drop: R.Espagnol 2,

Upington
Referee: Wege (South Africa)

North west Cape: Ch.Husamen; P.Maas, K.de Jong, J.Kotze, A.van Tonder; L.Harvey, T.van Zyl; N.De Pager; D.Herman, T.Kamfer; J.Niewoudt, H.Engelbrech (capt.); M.Vincent, V.Hanekom, B.Young.
Argentina:H.Silva (capt.); E.Morgan, G.Blacksley, J.Wittman, N.Carbone; A. Anthony, J.Fernández; H.Incola, U.Constante, R.Foster.

3 August 1971

Far North	6 - 6	Argentina XV
Pen: B.Viljoen; Drop: F.Roux		Try: A.Rodríguez Jurado, M.Walther

Pietersburg
Referee: Max Baise (South Africa)

Argentina:D.Morgan; M.Walther, A.Rodríguez Jurado, G.Blacksley, N.Pérez; R.Espagnol, A.Etchegaray; N.Carbone, H.Miguens, M.Morgan; J.Fernández, A.Orzábal; H.Incola, J.Constante, L.García Yáñez

7 August 1971

SA Gazelles (South Africa)	0 - 12	Argentina
		Pen: T.Harris-Smith 2 Drop: T.Harris-Smith 2

Pretoria
Referee: Cas de Bruyn (South Africa)

Gazelles: J.van Deventer; D.Svodoba, R.Swartz, T.Symons, A.Leter; D.Svodoba, R.Holm; T.Neetling (capt.), J.Wagenaar, D.Coleshaw; P.van Devente, J.van Aswegen; M.van Rensburg, K.van Dyck, K.Grobler.
Argentina:D.Morgan; M.Walther, A.Rodríguez Jurado, A.Travaglini, M.Pascual; T.Harris, A.Etchegaray; H.Silva (capt.), J.Wittman, M.Morgan; A.Anthony, J.Fernández; R.Foster, R.Handley, H.Incola.

11 August 1971

Giqualand West	22 - 11	Argentina XV
Try: de K.Waldeck, B.Swartz; T.Smith, B.Fourie; Con: P.Smith, P.Visagie; Pen: P.Smith, P.Visagie,		Try: M.Walther; Con: T.Harris-Smith; Pen: de T.Harris-Smit; Drop: A.Etchegaray

Kimberley
Referee: Corin (South Africa)

Griqualand West: T.Smith; O.Fourie, B.Swartz, K.Waldeck, J.Lategan; P.Visagie, J.Viljoen; B.Fourie, D.Slabbert, S.Nel; P.Smith, J.Theron; V.Schnetler, P.van Deventer, D.Vorster.
Argentina:D.Morgan; M.Pascual, A.Travaglini, R.Matarazzo, M.Walther; T.Harris-Smith, A.Etchegaray; H.Silva (capt.), H.Miguens, J.Wittman; B.Otaño, L.García Yáñez; R.Foster, R.Handley, H.Incola

== Sources ==
- Vivian Jenkins, ed. (1979). Rothmans Rugby Yearbook 1979-80. Queen Anne Press. pp. 47–51. ISBN 0-354-09087-9.
- Union Argentina de Rugby (November 1971). "MEMORIA Temporada año 1971" (PDF) (in Spanish). Archived from the original (.doc) on 1 November 2012.
