= M49 spotting scope =

The M49 spotting scope, also known as the M49 observation telescope, is a multipurpose scope system used primarily for long range marksmanship observation. It can also be used for observing the effects of artillery fires, wind direction, and other general purposes.

== Design ==
The M49 is a fixed 20-power telescope with an eyepiece focus. It has a field of view of 2 degrees and an exit pupil diameter of 0.108 inches. The M49 is an erect image instrument that is magnified by the lenses in the eyepiece.

The M49 does not have an adjustable sunshade; however, the front end of the body tube extends approximately three-quarters of an inch beyond the objective providing a permanent sunshade.

The telescope is focused by turning the knurled focusing sleeve.

== Additional information ==
- Length: 14 ½ in
- Power: 20x
- Field of view: 2 degrees 12 minutes

== Conflicts ==
The M49 spotting scope saw usage in the Vietnam War with the US Marine Corps.
