= M22 (Johannesburg) =

Metropolitan route in the City of Johannesburg, South Africa

Metropolitan route M22

Route information
- Maintained by Johannesburg Roads Agency and Gauteng Department of Roads and Transport

Major junctions
- North end: M1
- South end: M71

Location
- Country: South Africa

Highway system
- Numbered routes of South Africa
← M20	→ M27

The M22 is a short metropolitan route in the Greater Johannesburg metropolitan area, South Africa.

== Route ==
The M22 begins at the M1 and ends at the M71.
