= M52 (Johannesburg) =

Metropolitan route in the City of Johannesburg, South Africa

Metropolitan route M52

Route information
- Maintained by Johannesburg Roads Agency and Gauteng Department of Roads and Transport

Major junctions
- West end: M14
- East end: M39

Location
- Country: South Africa

Highway system
- Numbered routes of South Africa
← M49	→ M53

The M52 is a short metropolitan route in Johannesburg, South Africa.

== Route ==
The M52 begins at the M14 and ends at the M39.
