= Gysie Pienaar =

South African rugby union footballer

- Born: Zacharias Matheus Johannes Pienaar; 21 December 1954 (age 71) Bloemfontein, Free State, South Africa
- Height: 1.78 m (5 ft 10 in)
- Weight: 80 kg (180 lb)
- School: Dr Viljoen High School, Bloemfontein

Rugby union career
- Position: Full-back
Provincial / State sides
Years	Team	Apps	(Points)
1975–1987	Free State	165	(906)
International career
Years	Team	Apps	(Points)
1980–1981	South Africa	13	(14)

Zacharias Matheus Johannes 'Gysie' Pienaar (born 21 December 1954 in Bloemfontein, South Africa) is a former South African rugby union player.

== Playing career ==
Pienaar played for the Free State and the Springboks. He made his test debut against the visiting South American Jaguars team on 3 May 1980 as a replacement in the second half for Pierre Edwards. His first starting cap for the Springboks was on 31 May 1980 at Newlands in Cape Town against the touring British and Irish Lions team captained by Bill Beaumont.

Pienaar was capped 13 times for the Springboks, scored 2 tries and converted two penalty goals for a total of 14 test points.

=== Test history ===
No.	Opposition	Result (SA 1st)	Position	Points	Date	Venue
1.	South American Jaguars	18–9	Replacement		3 May 1980	Kings Park Stadium, Durban
2.	British Lions	26–22	Full-back		31 May 1980	Newlands, Cape Town
3.	(British & Irish Lions) British Lions	26–19	Full-back	4 (1 try)	14 June 1980	Free State Stadium, Bloemfontein
4.	(British & Irish Lions) British Lions	12–10	Full-back		28 June 1980	Boet Erasmus Stadium, Port Elizabeth
5.	(British & Irish Lions) British Lions	13–17	Full-back	6 (2 penalties)	12 July 1980	Loftus Versfeld, Pretoria
6.	South American Jaguars	22–13	Full-back		18 October 1980	Wanderers Club, Montevideo
7.	South American Jaguars	30–16	Full-back		25 October 1980	Prince of Wales Country Club, Santiago
8.	France	37–15	Full-back	4 (1 try)	8 November 1980	Loftus Versfeld, Pretoria
9.	Ireland	23–15	Full-back		30 May 1981	Newlands, Cape Town
10.	Ireland	12–10	Full-back		6 June 1981	Kings Park Stadium, Durban
11.	New Zealand	9–14	Full Back		15 August 1981	Lancaster Park, Christchurch
12.	New Zealand	24–12	Full-back		29 August 1981	Athletic Park, Wellington
13.	New Zealand	22–25	Full Back		12 September 1981	Eden Park, Auckland

== Accolades ==
Pienaar was named the SA Rugby Player of the Year for 1980.

== Personal ==
Pienaar is the father of Ruan Pienaar, a professional rugby player and former Springbok.

== See also ==
- List of South Africa national rugby union players – Springbok no. 506
