= Edenvale, South Africa =

Edenvale
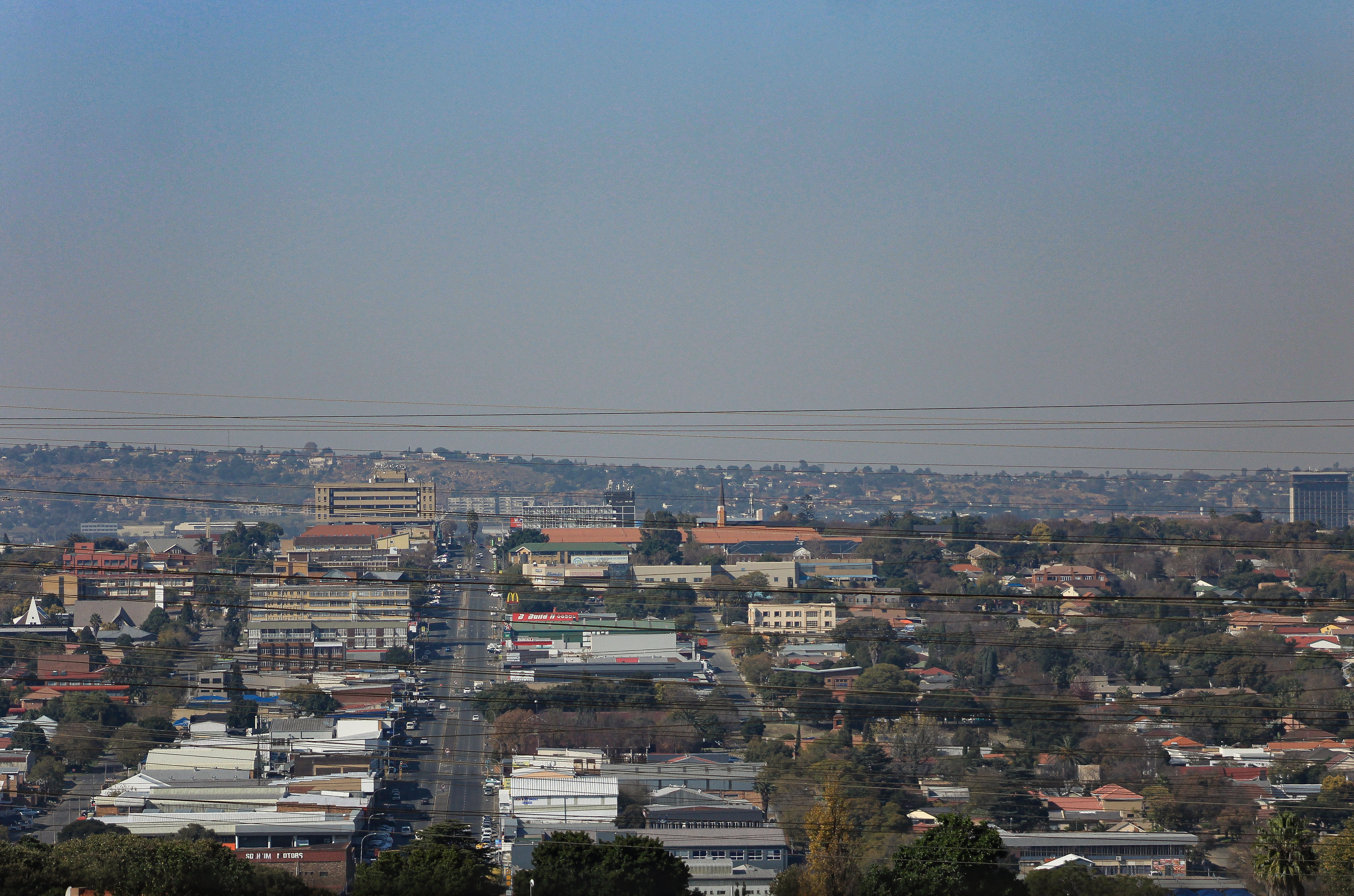
- Van Riebeeck Avenue, Edenvale CBD as seen from Greenstone Hill

- Location within Gauteng Location within South Africa
- Coordinates: 26°8′28″S 28°9′10″E
- Country: South Africa
- Province: Gauteng
- Municipality: Ekurhuleni
- Established: 1903; 123 years ago

Area
  - Total: 20.03 km^{2} (7.73 sq mi)

Population (2011)
  - Total: 49,292
  - Density: 2,461/km^{2} (6,374/sq mi)

Racial makeup (2011)
  - Black African: 20.5%
  - Coloured: 2.8%
  - Indian/Asian: 8.7%
  - White: 66.1%
  - Other: 1.9%

First languages (2011)
  - English: 72.2%
  - Afrikaans: 11.6%
  - Greek: 4.5%
  - Zulu: 4.0%
  - Portuguese: 3.6%
  - Italian: 2.1%
  - Northern Sotho: 2.0%
- Time zone: UTC+2 (SAST)
- Postal code (street): 1609
- PO box: 1610
- Area code: 011
- Website: ekurhuleni.gov.za

Edenvale is a town on the East Rand in Gauteng, South Africa. It is part of the Ekurhuleni Metropolitan Municipality. It lies about halfway between the O.R. Tambo International Airport and the Johannesburg city centre and is located 12 km by road from Sandton and about 9 km from the closest Gautrain station.

== History ==
It started out in 1903, after the Anglo Boer War as a small settlement on the farm Rietfontein which sprung up around the Rietfontein Gold Mine. It was made a municipality in 1942. The town is probably name after John Eden, a part owner of the farm Rietfontein. It was initially populated by Cornish mineworkers.

== Suburbs of Edenvale ==
Residential suburbs include:

- Clarens Park
- De Klerkshof
- Dowerglen
- Dunvegan
- Eastleigh (part residential)
- Edenglen
- Elma Park
- Hurlyvale
- Illiondale
- Isandovale (part residential)
- Marais Steyn Park
- Rietfontein (part of Rietfontein 61-ir) (Rietfontein 63-ir)

Industrial suburbs include:

- Sebenza
- Eastleigh (part industrial)
- Isandovale (part industrial)

== Demographics ==
Edenvale is a busy city that ranges from middle-class areas such as Edenvale Central, Eastleigh and Illiondale, to the more upper-class areas such as Dowerglen and Edenglen. Edenvale Central (locally referred to as The Avenues) has seen high investment over the past few years in the form of upper-income clusters and townhouses. This has resulted in small-scale gentrification and hence an increase in coffee shops and streetside cafes. There is also a trend in Eastleigh and Illiondale to purchase derelict properties and renovate them, which has also benefitted the area. Much of Edenvale widely diversified by immigration to other parts of Africa, notably: Zambians and Malawians. It also hosts a large population of Portuguese, Greeks and Italians.

== Economy ==
=== Retail ===
In the last ten years, the area to the north of Edenvale (Modderfontein) has expanded significantly. Five malls have been erected, Greenstone and Stoneridge mall, Eden Meadows, Stonehill Crossing and Green Valley as well as an array of complexes and townhouses, in an area now called Greenstone Hill and Greenstone Park, just west of Illiondale. This recent, yet rapid influx of infrastructure and added commercial business has bankrupted businesses in Lungile Mtshali Road (formerly Van Riebeeck Road; the main thoroughfare through the Edenvale City Centre) forcing numerous store owners to liquidate their capital investments.

== Law and government ==
=== Government ===
In 1995, after the local government elections, Edenvale was amalgamated with some surrounding areas, including Modderfontein, Rabie Ridge Extensions 4 and 5, Chloorkop and the western part of Tembisa to form the Lethabong municipality, as part of the short-lived transitional Khayalami Metropolitan Council, which also included Midrand and Kempton Park/Tembisa. This arrangement ended in 2000, and Edenvale is now part of the Ekurhuleni Metropolitan Municipality, which includes much of the East Rand, while Modderfontein and Rabie Ridge became part of the City of Johannesburg Metropolitan Municipality.

=== Politics ===
- Edenvale (House of Assembly of South Africa constituency)

== Notable people ==
- Tyla (born 2002), singer and songwriter
- Kyle Stolk (born 1996), competitive swimmer
- Tasmin Pepper (born 1990), race driver
- Jordan Pepper (born 1996), race driver
- Jessica Pengelly (born 1991), swimmer
- Marnus Schoeman (born 1989), rugby union player
- Jayde Kruger (born 1988), race driver
- Mahomed Navsa (born 1957), judge
- Chris Williams (born 1959), golfer
- Clinton Whitelaw (born 1970), golfer
- Tamara Reeves (born 1982), former cricketer
- Panyaza Lesufi (born 1968), politician
