= Modderfontein (East Rand) =

- Location within Gauteng Location within South Africa
- Coordinates: 26.0845°S 28.1669°E
- Country: South Africa
- Province: Gauteng
- Municipality: City of Johannesburg

Area
  - Total: 27.83 km^{2} (10.75 sq mi)

Population (2011)
  - Total: 131
  - Density: 4.71/km^{2} (12.2/sq mi)

Racial makeup (2011)
  - Black African: 83.2%
  - White: 16.8%
- Time zone: UTC+2 (SAST)
- Postal code (street): 1609
- PO box: 1645

Modderfontein is a small town on the East Rand of Gauteng, South Africa. It began as a mining town adjacent to the Mud River, hence its name which is Afrikaans for "mud spring" or "fountain". It is located in the City of Johannesburg Metropolitan Municipality, adjacent to Kempton Park in the neighbouring City of Ekurhuleni Metropolitan Municipality.

== History ==
Carl Friedrich Wolff was born on Christmas Eve 1851 in Kempten, the capital of the Austro-Bavarian district of Allgäu in southern Germany. After school and an early training in the iron and steel industry, he moved to London and in 1873, embarked on a financial career.

In 1875, his company, Adolph Mosenthal & Co. transferred him to South Africa where he took command of the accounting division in the Port Elizabeth branch. In 1880 he was transferred to Bloemfontein where he married Maria Fichardt, granddaughter of Carl Wuras, a noted missionary.

In 1888, Wolff was transferred to Pretoria to establish a branch office. He became a leading figure among the German community and was elected as chairman of the local German Club. From Pretoria he moved to Johannesburg to open another branch office and became a founder member and the first chairman of the German Club in the city.

Because of his German origin, Carl Friedrich Wolff was a natural choice as a go-between for the Z.A.R. in their transactions with the Nobel Trust, who were building the dynamite factory. The Nobel company had established the Zuid-Afrikaansche Fabrieken voor Ontplofbare Stoffen and had appointed Wolff as local director in South Africa (although he apparently retained his connections with his English employers).

The Nobel Trust exercised complete financial control over the dynamite factory and Wolff's major role appears to have been as negotiator with the Z.A.R. government and local landowners. During the establishment of the dynamite factory and the delicate negotiations which evolved as a result of the private rail link from the factory to Zuurfontein, Wolff played a prominent part.

The events taking place at this time can well be imagined. Gold fever had gripped the Witwatersrand and the dynamite factory was a vital industrial necessity. Land speculation was rife, community development was beginning to take shape and Carl Wolff, at the peak of his career, was crucial to these events.

Establishing the rail link was of prime importance and successful negotiation with the owners of the farm Zuurfontein, the Buitendags, was crucial. The Buitendags' great complaint was that the existing railway line already divided their property and some 113 morgen on the east side of the farm was completely cut off from the main property. The new railroad to the dynamite factory would further divide their property and disrupt their farming operations.

== Modderfontein New City ==
Modderfontein New City
- Interactive map of Modderfontein New City
- Location: Modderfontein, City of Johannesburg Metropolitan Municipality
- Status: Abandoned
- Constructed: 2015
- Estimated completion: 2030/35
- Website: www.heartland.co.za

Companies
- Developer: Zendai Development South Africa
- Owner: Shanghai Zendai Property Ltd.

Technical details
- Cost: US$6.4 Billion+ (R84 Billion) over a 15 year period
- Size: 1,600 ha (170,000,000 sq ft)

Modderfontein New City, or Modderfontein Mega City, was a 16,000,000 m^{2} (1,600 ha) project approved for construction in Modderfontein. The project was designed by the Shangai Zendai Group (who bought the land in 2013) and was expected to cost $8 billion, roughly R84 billion at the time. However, due to a lack of funding together with a disagreement between the developers and the City of Johannesburg, the project was abandoned.

The land was sold in December 2016 to a developer (M&T development group) who has begun construction of a much more scaled down project, in the form of a gated-community style housing development. This has led to the southern suburbs of Modderfontein (Greenstone, Thornhill, Lakeside, Westlake and Longmeadow) being very developed while the north is relatively untouched, including the Modderfontein Nature Reserve. The original town centre has been preserved.
