= Elsburg =

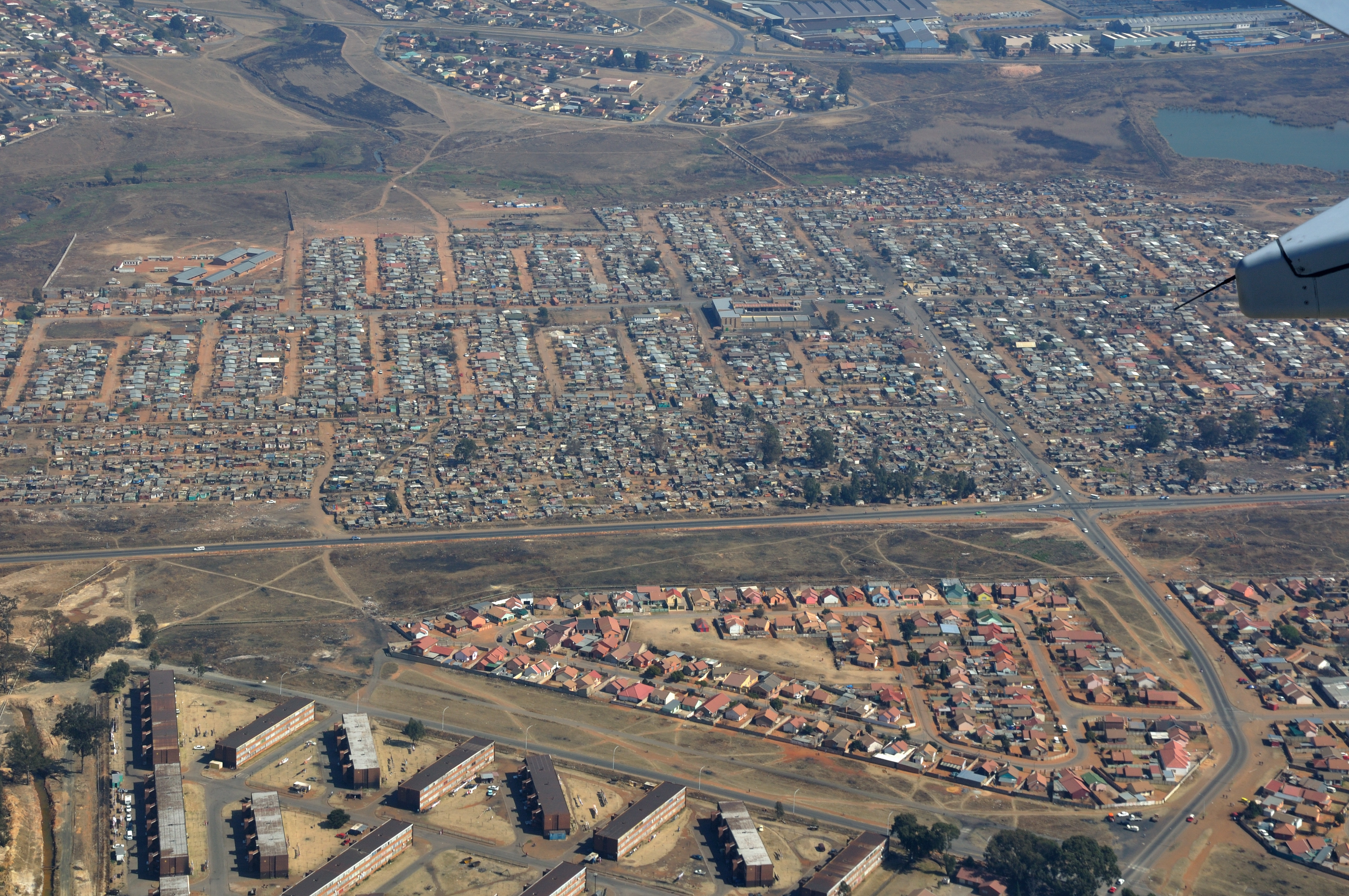
- Aerial view overhead Elsburg

- Location within Gauteng Location within South Africa
- Coordinates: 26.245°S 28.197°E
- Country: South Africa
- Province: Gauteng
- Municipality: Ekurhuleni
- Main Place: Germiston

Area
  - Total: 3.05 km^{2} (1.18 sq mi)

Population (2011)
  - Total: 6,231
  - Density: 2,040/km^{2} (5,290/sq mi)

Racial makeup (2011)
  - Black African: 22.3%
  - Coloured: 3.8%
  - Indian/Asian: 2.7%
  - White: 70.7%
  - Other: 0.5%

First languages (2011)
  - Afrikaans: 65.0%
  - English: 16.2%
  - Zulu: 4.6%
  - Sotho: 2.2%
  - Other: 12.1%
- Time zone: UTC+2 (SAST)
- Postal code (street): 1428
- PO box: 1407

Elsburg is a town in Ekurhuleni in the Gauteng province of South Africa. It is a town some 6 km south-east of Germiston.

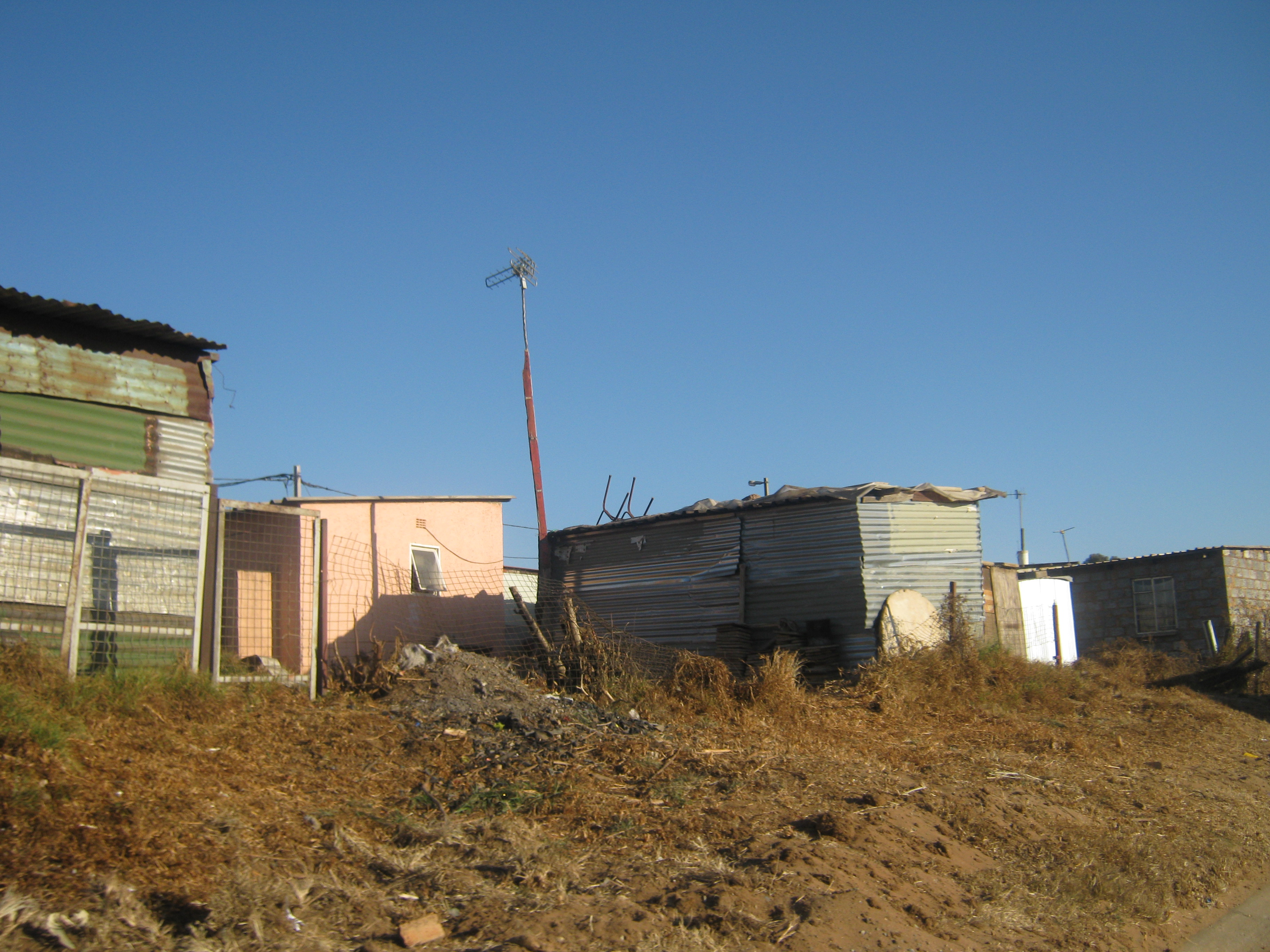
A squatter camp on the outskirts of Elsburg.

== History ==
Laid out on the farm Klippoortjie in 1887 and proclaimed a town in 1908. It was named after the owner, Commandant Johannes Marthinus Els. Els returned from the Boer war and divided his farm among his remaining troops who had lost everything. It was administered by a health committee from 1908 and by a village council from 1938. Municipal status was achieved in October 1957. It almost became the capital of the goldfields instead of Johannesburg.
