= Primrose, South Africa =

Primrose
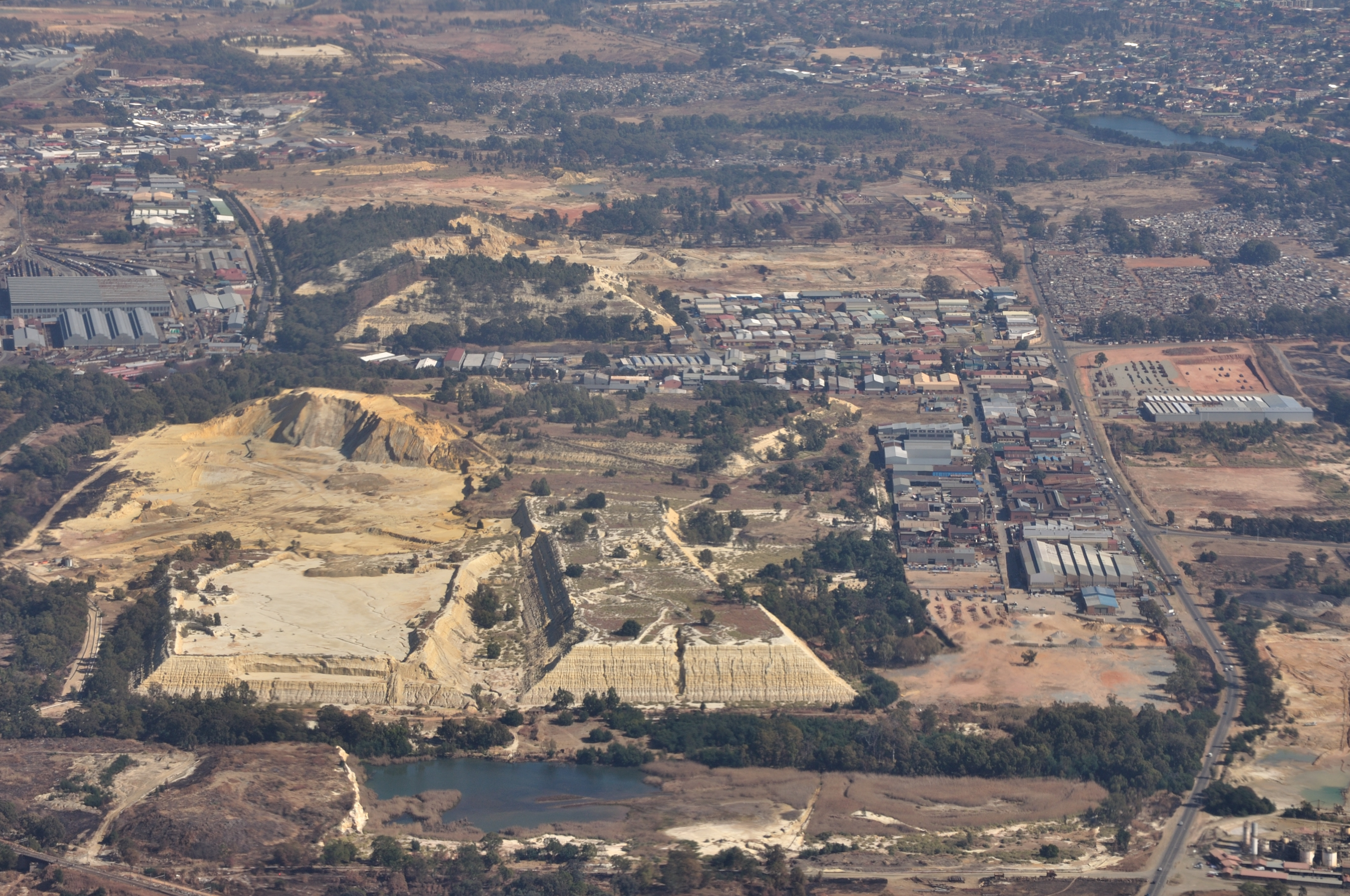
- Primrose

- Location within Gauteng Location within South Africa
- Coordinates: 26°11′S 28°10′E
- Country: South Africa
- Province: Gauteng
- Municipality: Ekurhuleni
- Main Place: Germiston

Area
  - Total: 4.54 km^{2} (1.75 sq mi)

Population (2011)
  - Total: 14,024
  - Density: 3,090/km^{2} (8,000/sq mi)

Racial makeup (2011)
  - Black African: 35.1%
  - Coloured: 3.7%
  - Indian/Asian: 4.2%
  - White: 56.1%
  - Other: 1.0%

First languages (2011)
  - Afrikaans: 35.5%
  - English: 34.7%
  - Zulu: 8.6%
  - Northern Sotho: 3.1%
  - Other: 18.0%
- Time zone: UTC+2 (SAST)
- Postal code (street): 1401
- PO box: 1416

Primrose is a suburb of Germiston in Ekurhuleni, Gauteng, South Africa. It is an old residential area built in the early 1900s, in response to the gold rush.
