= List of South Africa rugby union test matches =

A list of all international test matches played by the Springboks.

== Overall ==
South Africa's overall test match record against all nations, updated to 13 November 2026, is as follows:

Decade	Games				
Decade	Played	Won	Lost	Drawn	Win percentage
1890s	7	1	6	0	14.29%
1900s	7	3	1	3	42.86%
1910s	8	7	1	0	87.5%
1920s	11	6	3	2	54.55%
1930s	17	13	4	0	76.47%
1940s	4	4	0	0	100%
1950s	21	13	7	1	61.9%
1960s	47	28	14	5	59.57%
1970s	25	15	6	4	60%
1980s	27	22	5	0	81.48%
1990s	82	54	26	2	65.85%
2000s	125	76	47	2	60.8%
2010s	122	73	44	5	59.84%
2020s	78	59	19	0	75.64%
Overall	581	373	184	24	64.2%

== 2020s ==
2020s record

Games played	Won	Lost	Drawn	Win percentage
78	59	19	0	75.64%

=== 2026 ===
2026 record

Games played	Won	Lost	Drawn	Win percentage
12	8	4	0	66.67%

21 November 2026	Ireland	20–17	South Africa	Aviva Stadium, Dublin
16:40 WET (UTC+0)			Try: Morné van den Berg 35' c; Malcolm Marx 57' c Con: Sacha Feinberg-Mngomezulu (2/2) 36', 58'; Pen: Sacha Feinberg-Mngomezulu 4' (1/1)	Attendance: 51,711; Referee: Christophe Ridley (France)

13 November 2026	France	21–19	South Africa	Stade de France, Paris
CET (UTC+1)			Try: Jan-Hendrik Wessels 29' c; Cobus Reinach 50' c; Malcolm Marx 71'; Con: Sacha Feinberg-Mngomezulu (2/2) 30', 51'; Manie Libbok (0/1) 73'	Attendance: 80,000; Referee: Andrea Piardi (Italy)

7 November 2026	Italy	7–66	South Africa	Allianz Stadium, Turin
12:40 CET (UTC+1)			Try: Sacha Feinberg-Mngomezulu 8'; Morné van den Berg 15'; Malcolm Marx 19', 32'; Siya Kolisi 22'; Damian Willemse 24'; Wilco Louw 49'; Paul de Villiers 72'; Ethan Hooker 80'; Con: Sacha Feinberg-Mngomezulu (9/9) 9', 16', 20', 23', 25', 33', 50', 73', 80'; Pen: Sacha Feinberg-Mngomezulu (1/1) 5'	Attendance: 31,500; Referee: Eoghan Cross (Ireland)

27 September 2026	Australia	42–38	South Africa	Optus Stadium, Perth
17:45 AWST (UTC+8)			Try: Johan Grobbelaar 9'; Edwill van der Merwe 29'; Penalty Try 70'; Morné van den Berg 73'; Ox Nche 79'; Con: Handré Pollard (2/2) 10', 30'; Sacha Feinberg-Mngomezulu (2/2) 73', 79'; Pen: Handré Pollard (1/1) 3'	Attendance: 54,678; Referee: Andrea Piardi (Italy)

12 September 2026	South Africa	43–28	New Zealand	M&T Bank Stadium, Baltimore
17:00 (EDT) (UTC-4)	Try: Damian de Allende 14', 48'; Morné van den Berg 21'; Pieter-Steph du Toit 51'; Kurt-Lee Arendse 71'; Cameron Hanekom 75'; Con: Sacha Feinberg-Mngomezulu (2/3) 15', 22'; Morné van den Berg (1/1) 52'; Manie Libbok (2/2) 72', 76'; Pen: Sacha Feinberg-Mngomezulu (1/1) 3'			Attendance: 68,173; Referee: Karl Dickson (England)

5 September 2026	South Africa	29–24	New Zealand	FNB Stadium, Soweto
17:10 (SAST) (UTC+2)	Try: Kurt-Lee Arendse 20'; Penalty Try 36'; Jesse Kriel 57'; Malcolm Marx 65'; Con: Sacha Feinberg-Mngomezulu (2/3) 58', 66'; Pen: Sacha Feinberg-Mngomezulu (1/1) 70'			Attendance: 85,976; Referee: Nika Amashukeli (Georgia)

29 August 2026	South Africa	33–26	New Zealand	DHL Stadium, Cape Town
17:10 (SAST) (UTC+2)	Try: Jesse Kriel 1' e; Damian de Allende 21' e; Siya Kolisi 37' e Con: Cheslin Kolbe (3/3) 2', 22', 38'; Pen: Cheslin Kolbe (4/4) 18', 48', 50', 71'			Attendance: 62,000; Referee: Angus Gardner ( Australia)

22 August 2026	South Africa	16–33	New Zealand	Ellis Park Stadium, Johannesburg
17:10 (SAST) (UTC+2)	Try: Andre Esterhuizen 13' c Con: Cheslin Kolbe (1/1) 13'; Pen: Cheslin Kolbe (3/3) 4', 26', 46'			Attendance: 60,592; Referee: Matthew Carley (England)

8 August 2026	Argentina	10–17	South Africa	Estadio José Amalfitani, Buenos Aires
16:00 (ART) (UTC-3)			Try: Edwill van der Merwe 39' c Cameron Hanekom 62' c Con: Sacha Feinberg-Mngomezulu (1/1) 40'; Handré Pollard (1/1) 63'; Pen: Sacha Feinberg-Mngomezulu (1/1) 6'	Attendance: 49,540; Referee: Christophe Ridley (England)

18 July 2026	South Africa	43–0	Wales	Kings Park Stadium, Durban
17:10 (SAST) (UTC+2)	Try: Jasper Wiese 4' c Cobus Reinach 13' c Jesse Kriel 40' c Jaco Williams 40'; Herschel Jantjies 62'; Kurt-Lee Arendse 68'; Paul de Villiers 79' c Con: Vusi Moyo (3/4) 5', 14', 41'; Manie Libbok (1/4) 79'			Attendance: 40,299; Referee: Andrew Brace (Ireland)

11 July 2026	South Africa	42–28	Scotland	Loftus Versfeld, Pretoria
17:10 (SAST) (UTC+2)	Try: Embrose Papier 16' c Evan Roos 18' c Elrigh Louw 57' c Damian Willemse 59' c Zachary Porthen 65' c Jesse Kriel 77' c Con: Handré Pollard (5/5) 17', 19', 57', 60', 66'; Quan Horn (1/1) 77'			Attendance: 45,053; Referee: Pierre Brousset (France)

4 July 2026	South Africa	45–21	England	Ellis Park Stadium, Johannesburg
17:10 (SAST) (UTC+2)	Try: Thomas du Toit 2' c Cheslin Kolbe 5' c Kurt-Lee Arendse 11'; Grant Williams 44' c Jesse Kriel 56' c Malcolm Marx 72' c Ben-Jason Dixon 78' c Con: Cheslin Kolbe (5/7) 6', 45', 57', 73', 79'			Attendance: 52,790; Referee: James Doleman (New Zealand)

=== 2025 ===
2025 record

Games played	Won	Lost	Drawn	Win percentage
14	12	2	0	85.71%

29 November 2025	Wales	0–73	South Africa	Millennium Stadium, Cardiff
15:10 GMT (UTC+0)			Try: Gerhard Steenekamp 9' c Ethan Hooker 14' c Jasper Wiese 31' c Wilco Louw 42' c Morné van den Berg 44' c Sacha Feinberg-Mngomezulu (2) 46' c, 63' c Canan Moodie 49' c Andre Esterhuizen 54' m Ruan Nortjé 69' c Eben Etzebeth 74' m Con: Sacha Feinberg-Mngomezulu (9/11) 10', 15', 32', 44', 44', 47', 50', 64', 70'	Attendance: 50,112; Referee: Luc Ramos (France)

22 November 2025	Ireland	13–24	South Africa	Aviva Stadium, Dublin
17:40 WET (UTC+0)			Try: Damian Willemse 3' m Cobus Reinach 34' c Penalty try 44'; Sacha Feinberg-Mngomezulu 47' m Con: Sacha Feinberg-Mngomezulu (1/3) 34'	Attendance: 51,711; Referee: Matthew Carley (England)

15 November 2025	Italy	14–32	South Africa	Allianz Stadium, Turin
13:40 CET (UTC+1)			Try: Marco van Staden 40+1' c Morné van den Berg 60' c Grant Williams 72' c Ethan Hooker 79' m Con: Handré Pollard (2/2) 40+2', 61'; Manie Libbok (1/2) 73'; Pen: Handré Pollard (2/2) 34', 55'	Attendance: 32,103; Referee: James Doleman (New Zealand)

8 November 2025	France	17–32	South Africa	Stade de France, Paris
21:10 CET (UTC+1)			Try: Cobus Reinach 32' c André Esterhuizen 64' m Grant Williams 70' c Sacha Feinberg-Mngomezulu 76' c Con: Sacha Feinberg-Mngomezulu (3/4) 33', 71', 77'; Pen: Sacha Feinberg-Mngomezulu (2/4) 9', 12'	Attendance: 80,000; Referee: Angus Gardner (Australia)

1 November 2025	South Africa	61–7	Japan	Wembley Stadium, London, England
16:10 GMT (UTC+0)	Try: Siya Kolisi 3' c Sacha Feinberg-Mngomezulu (2) 12' c, 18' m Penalty try 35'; Wilco Louw 46' c Kurt-Lee Arendse (2) 57' c, 66' c André Esterhuizen 62' c Jesse Kriel 78' c Con: Sacha Feinberg-Mngomezulu (3/4) 4', 13', 47'; Manie Libbok (4/4) 58', 63', 67', 79'; Pen: Sacha Feinberg-Mngomezulu (1/1) 17'			Attendance: 89,000; Referee: Eoghan Cross (Ireland)

4 October 2025	Argentina	27–29	South Africa	Twickenham Stadium, London, England
14:00 BST (UTC+1)			Try: Cobus Reinach (2) 38' c, 52' c Malcolm Marx (2) 44' m, 58' c Con: Sacha Feinberg-Mngomezulu (3/4) 39', 53', 59'; Pen: Sacha Feinberg-Mngomezulu (1/1) 10'	Attendance: 70,360; Referee: Andrea Piardi (Italy)

27 September 2025	South Africa	67-30	Argentina	Kings Park Stadium, Durban
17:10 SAST (UTC+02)	Try: Malcolm Marx 30'; Sacha Feinberg-Mngomezulu 37', 40', 50'; Cheslin Kolbe 42'; Morne van den Berg 59'; Pieter-Steph du Toit 65', 79'; Manie Libbok 74'; Con: Sacha Feinberg-Mngomezulu (8); Pen: Sacha Feinberg-Mngomezulu (2)			Attendance: 45,158; Referee: Angus Gardner (Australia)

13 September 2025	New Zealand	10-43	South Africa	Wellington Regional Stadium, Wellington
09:10 SAST (UTC+02)			Try: Cheslin Kolbe (2) 24' c, 42' c Damian Willemse 60' c Kwagga Smith 68' m RG Snyman 72' c André Esterhuizen 78' c Con: Manie Libbok (5/6) 25', 43', 61', 73', 79'; Pen: Manie Libbok (1/1) 46'	Attendance: 34,068; Referee: Nika Amashukeli (Georgia)

6 September 2025	New Zealand	24-17	South Africa	Eden Park, Auckland
09:10 SAST (UTC+02)			Try: Malcolm Marx 62' c Cobus Reinach 74' c Con: Sacha Feinberg-Mngomezulu (2/2) 63', 75'; Pen: Handré Pollard (1/2) 23'	Attendance: 48,312; Referee: Karl Dickson (England)

23 August 2025	South Africa	30–22	Australia	DHL Stadium, Cape Town
17:10 SAST (UTC+02)	Try: Canan Moodie 10' c Kwagga Smith 34' c Eben Etzebeth 73' c Con: Handré Pollard (3/3) 11', 35', 74'; Pen: Handré Pollard (3/3) 1', 5', 56'			Attendance: 56,350; Referee: James Doleman (New Zealand)

16 August 2025	South Africa	22–38	Australia	Ellis Park Stadium, Johannesburg
17:10 SAST (UTC+02)	Try: Kurt-Lee Arendse 1' c André Esterhuizen 12' m Siya Kolisi 17' c Con: Manie Libbok (2/3) 2', 18'; Pen: Manie Libbok (1/1) 8'			Attendance: 51,300; Referee: Ben O'Keeffe (New Zealand)

19 July 2025	South Africa	55–10	Georgia	Mbombela Stadium, Mbombela
17:10 SAST (UTC+02)	Try: Boan Venter 9' m Marnus van der Merwe (2) 14' m, 32' c Canan Moodie 17' m Edwill van der Merwe (2) 47' m, 73' c Damian Willemse 56' c Kurt-Lee Arendse 79' c Handré Pollard 80+1' c Con: Sacha Feinberg-Mngomezulu (1/5) 33'; Handré Pollard (4/4) 57', 74', 79', 80+2'			Attendance: 36,842; Referee: Matthew Carley (England)

12 July 2025	South Africa	45–0	Italy	Nelson Mandela Bay Stadium, Gqeberha
17:10 SAST (UTC+02)	Try: Grant Williams 8' m Edwill van der Merwe (2) 15' m, 31' c Canan Moodie 37' m Malcolm Marx 50' c Makazole Mapimpi 72' c Jan-Hendrik Wessels 80' c Con: Manie Libbok (4/7) 32', 51', 73', 80+1'			Attendance: 44,282; Referee: Andrew Brace (Ireland)

5 July 2025	South Africa	42–24	Italy	Loftus Versfeld Stadium, Pretoria
17:10 SAST (UTC+02)	Try: Jesse Kriel 11' c van den Berg (2) 23' c, 37' c Kurt-Lee Arendse 30' c Vincent Koch 57' c Marco van Staden 73' c Con: Handré Pollard (6/6) 12', 23', 31', 38', 58', 74'			Attendance: 42,632; Referee: Hollie Davidson (Scotland)

=== 2024 ===
2024 record

Games played	Won	Lost	Drawn	Win percentage
13	11	2	0	84.6%

23 November 2024	Wales	12–45	South Africa	Millennium Stadium, Cardiff
17:40 GMT (UTC+0)			Try: Franco Mostert; Eben Etzebeth; Kurt-Lee Arendse; Elrigh Louw; Aphelele Fassi; Gerhard Steenekamp; Jordan Hendrikse; Con: Jordan Hendrikse (5)	Referee: Karl Dickson (England)

16 November 2024	England	20–29	South Africa	Twickenham Stadium, London
17:40 GMT (UTC+0)			Try: Grant Williams du Toit; Cheslin Kolbe (2); Con: Manie Libbok (2); Handré Pollard (1); Pen: Handré Pollard (1)	Referee: Andrew Brace (Ireland)

10 November 2024	Scotland	15–32	South Africa	Murrayfield Stadium, Edinburgh
16:10 GMT (UTC+0)			Try: Makazole Mapimpi (2); Thomas du Toit; Jasper Wiese; Con: Handré Pollard (3); Pen: Handré Pollard (2)	Referee: Christophe Ridley (England)

28 September 2024	South Africa	48–7	Argentina	Mbombela Stadium, Mbombela
17:00 SAST (UTC+2)	Try: Aphelele Fassi (2); Pieter-Steph du Toit (2); Cheslin Kolbe; Malcolm Marx; Jesse Kriel; Con: Jaden Hendrikse (2); Handré Pollard (3); Pen: Jaden Hendrikse			Referee: Ben O'Keeffe (New Zealand)

21 September 2024	Argentina	29–28	South Africa	Madre de Ciudades, Santiago del Estero
18:00 ART (UTC-3)			Try: Aphelele Fassi; Jesse Kriel; Cobus Reinach; Con: Handré Pollard (2); Pen: Handré Pollard (2); Manie Libbok	Referee: Christophe Ridley (England)

7 September 2024	South Africa	18–12	New Zealand	DHL Stadium, Cape Town
17:00 SAST (UTC+2)	Try: Siya Kolisi; Malcolm Marx; Con: Handré Pollard; Pen: Handré Pollard; Sacha Feinberg-Mngomezulu			Referee: Matthew Carley (England)

31 August 2024	South Africa	31–27	New Zealand	Ellis Park, Johannesburg
17:00 SAST (UTC+2)	Try: Bongi Mbonambi; Kwagga Smith; Grant Williams; Con: Sacha Feinberg-Mngomezulu (2); Pen: Sacha Feinberg-Mngomezulu (4)			Referee: Andrew Brace (Ireland)

17 August 2024	Australia	12–30	South Africa	Optus Stadium, Perth
19:45 AWST (UTC+8)			Try: Aphelele Fassi; Marco van Staden; Malcolm Marx (2); Con: Sacha Feinberg-Mngomezulu; Handré Pollard; Pen: Sacha Feinberg-Mngomezulu (2)	Referee: Paul Williams (New Zealand)

10 August 2024	Australia	7–33	South Africa	Suncorp Stadium, Brisbane
14:45 AEST (UTC+10)			Try: Siya Kolisi; Pieter-Steph du Toit; Kurt-Lee Arendse (2); Kwagga Smith; Con: Sacha Feinberg-Mngomezulu (4)	Referee: Luke Pearce (England)

20 July 2024	South Africa	64–21	Portugal	Toyota Stadium, Bloemfontein
17:00 SAST (UTC+2)	Try: Jan-Hendrik Wessels; Phepsi Buthelezi; Kurt-Lee Arendse; Ben-Jason Dixon; Lukhanyo Am; Makazole Mapimpi (3); Quan Horn; Andre-Hugo Venter; Con: Manie Libbok (2); Sacha Feinberg-Mngomezulu (5)			Referee: Hollie Davidson (Scotland)

13 July 2024	South Africa	24–25	Ireland	Kings Park, Durban
17:00 SAST (UTC+2)	Pen: Handré Pollard (8)			Referee: Karl Dickson (England)

6 July 2024	South Africa	27–20	Ireland	Loftus Versfeld, Pretoria
17:00 SAST (UTC+2)	Try: Kurt-Lee Arendse; Cheslin Kolbe; Penalty Try; Con: Handré Pollard (2); Pen: Handré Pollard (2)			Referee: Luke Pearce (England)

22 June 2024	South Africa	41–13	Wales	Twickenham, London
14:00 BST (UTC+1)	Try: Jesse Kriel; Penalty Try; Makazole Mapimpi; Bongi Mbonambi; Edwill van der Merwe; Con: Jordan Hendrikse (2); Sacha Feinberg-Mngomezulu (2); Pen: Jordan Hendrikse; Sacha Feinberg-Mngomezulu			Referee: Chris Busby (Ireland)

=== 2023 ===
2023 record

Games played	Won	Lost	Drawn	Win percentage
13	11	2	0	84.61%

28 October 2023	New Zealand	11–12	South Africa	Stade de France, Paris
21:00 CEST (UTC+2)			Pen: Handré Pollard (4)	Referee: Wayne Barnes (England)

21 October 2023	England	15–16	South Africa	Stade de France, Paris
21:00 CEST (UTC+2)			Try: RG Snyman; Con: Handré Pollard; Pen: Manie Libbok; Handré Pollard (2)	Attendance: 78,098; Referee: Ben O'Keeffe (New Zealand)

15 October 2023	France	28–29	South Africa	Stade de France, Paris
21:00 CEST (UTC+2)			Try: Kurt-Lee Arendse; Damian de Allende; Cheslin Kolbe; Eben Etzebeth; Con: Manie Libbok (2); Handré Pollard; Pen: Handré Pollard	Attendance: 79,486; Referee: Ben O'Keeffe (New Zealand)

1 October 2023	South Africa	49–18	Tonga	Stade Vélodrome, Marseille
21:00 CEST (UTC+2)	Try: Cobus Reinach; Canan Moodie; Deon Fourie; Jesse Kriel; Willie Le Roux; Marco van Staden; Kwagga Smith; Con: Handré Pollard (4); Manie Libbok (3)			Attendance: 60,387; Referee: Luke Pearce (England)

23 September 2023	South Africa	8–13	Ireland	Stade de France, Saint-Denis
21:00 CEST (UTC+2)	Try: Kolbe 51' m Pen: Libbok (1/2) 6'	Report	Try: Hansen 33' c Con: Sexton 35'; Pen: Sexton (1/1) 59', Crowley (1/1) 77'	Referee: Ben O'Keeffe (New Zealand)

17 September 2023	South Africa	76–0	Romania	Stade de Bordeaux, Bordeaux
15:00 CEST (UTC+2)	Try: Reinach (3) 2' m, 8' c, 23' c Mapimpi (3) 6' c, 63' m, 67' c Willemse 11' c Fourie 42' m Penalty try 52'; Williams (2) 54' c, 61' c Le Roux 73' m Con: Willemse (5/7) 7', 9', 11', 24', 55'; De Klerk (2/4) 62', 68'			Attendance: 38,789; Referee: Mathieu Raynal (France)

10 September 2023	Scotland	3-18	South Africa	Stade Vélodrome, Marseille
17:45 CEST (UTC+2)			Try: Pieter-Steph du Toit; Kurt-Lee Arendse; Con: Faf de Klerk; Pen: Manie Libbok (2)	Referee: Angus Gardner (Australia)

25 August 2023	New Zealand	7–35	South Africa	Twickenham Stadium, London
19:30 BST (UTC+1)			Try: Siya Kolisi; Kurt-Lee Arendse; Malcolm Marx; Bongi Mbonambi; Kwagga Smith; Con: Manie Libbok (5)	Attendance: 80,827; Referee: Matthew Carley (England)

19 August 2023	Wales	16–52	South Africa	Millennium Stadium, Cardiff
15:15 BST (UTC+1)			Try: Malcolm Marx; Canan Moodie (2); Penalty try Jesse Kriel (2); Pieter-Steph du Toit; Damian Willemse; Con: Manie Libbok (5)	Attendance: 68,511; Referee: Andrew Brace (Ireland)

5 August 2023	Argentina	13–24	South Africa	José Amalfitani Stadium, Buenos Aires
16:10 ART (UTC-3)			Try: Makazole Mapimpi; Canan Moodie; Con: Manie Libbok; Pen: Manie Libbok (4)	Referee: Nika Amashukeli (Georgia)

29 July 2023	South Africa	22–21	Argentina	Ellis Park Stadium, Johannesburg
17:05 SAST (UTC+2)	Try: Eben Etzebeth; Damian de Allende; Manie Libbok; Con: Manie Libbok (2); Pen: Manie Libbok			Attendance: 45,000; Referee: Andrew Brace (Ireland)

15 July 2023	New Zealand	35–20	South Africa	Mount Smart Stadium, Auckland
19:05 NZST (UTC+12)			Try: Malcolm Marx; Cheslin Kolbe; Kwagga Smith; Con: Cheslin Kolbe; Pen: Faf de Klerk	Attendance: 31,265; Referee: Mathieu Raynal (France)

8 July 2023	South Africa	43–12	Australia	Loftus Versfeld, Pretoria
17:05 SAST (UTC+2)	Try: Kurt-Lee Arendse (3); Penalty Try (2); Pieter-Steph du Toit; Con: Manie Libbok (3); Pen: Manie Libbok			Attendance: 50,089; Referee: Ben O'Keeffe (New Zealand)

=== 2022 ===
2022 record

Games played	Won	Lost	Drawn	Win percentage
13	8	5	0	61.5%

26 November 2022	England	13–27	South Africa	Twickenham, London
17:30 GMT (UTC+0)			Try: Kurt-Lee Arendse; Eben Etzebeth; Con: Faf de Klerk; Pen: Faf de Klerk (3); Drop: Damian Willemse (2)	Referee: Angus Gardner (Australia)

19 November 2022	Italy	21–63	South Africa	Stadio Luigi Ferraris, Genoa
14:00 CET (UTC+1)			Try: Kurt-Lee Arendse (2); Bongi Mbonambi; Cheslin Kolbe; Kwagga Smith; Malcolm Marx; Steven Kitshoff; Damian Willemse; Cobus Reinach; Con: Cheslin Kolbe; Manie Libbok (5); Pen: Cheslin Kolbe (2)	Attendance: 26,457; Referee: Matthew Carley (England)

12 November 2022	France	30–26	South Africa	Stade Vélodrome, Marseille
21:00 CET (UTC+1)			Try: Siya Kolisi; Kurt-Lee Arendse; Con: Cheslin Kolbe; Faf de Klerk; Pen: Cheslin Kolbe (2); Faf de Klerk; Damian Willemse	Attendance: 62,500; Referee: Wayne Barnes (England)

5 November 2022	Ireland	19–16	South Africa	Aviva Stadium, Dublin
17:30 CET (UTC+1)			Try: Franco Mostert; Kurt-Lee Arendse; Pen: Damian Willemse; Cheslin Kolbe	Attendance: 51,000; Referee: Nika Amashukeli (Georgia)

24 September 2022	South Africa	38–21	Argentina	Kings Park Stadium, Durban
17:05 SAST (UTC+2)	Try: Jasper Wiese; Siya Kolisi; Penalty Try 2 Kurt-Lee Arendse; Con: Frans Steyn 3 Pen: Frans Steyn			Referee: Damon Murphy (Australia)

17 September 2022	Argentina	20–36	South Africa	Estadio Libertadores de América, Buenos Aires
16:10 ART (UTC-3)			Try: Penalty try Jaden Hendrikse; Malcolm Marx 2 Damian de Allende; Con: Damian Willemse; Frans Steyn 2 Pen: Damian Willemse	Referee: James Doleman (New Zealand)

3 September 2022	Australia	8–24	South Africa	Sydney Football Stadium, Sydney
19:35 AEST (UTC+10)			Try: Damian de Allende; Canan Moodie; Franco Mostert; Makazole Mapimpi; Con: Damian Willemse; Frans Steyn	Attendance: 45,000; Referee: Ben O'Keeffe (New Zealand)

27 August 2022	Australia	25–17	South Africa	Adelaide Oval, Adelaide
15:00 ACST (UTC+9:30)			Try: Kwagga Smith 2 Con: Elton Jantjies 2 Pen: Handre Pollard	Attendance: 36,336; Referee: Paul Williams (New Zealand)

13 August 2022	South Africa	23–35	New Zealand	Ellis Park Stadium, Johannesburg
17:05 SAST (UTC+2)	Try: Lukhanyo Am; Makazole Mapimpi; Con: Handre Pollard 2 Pen: Handre Pollard 3			Attendance: 61,519; Referee: Luke Pearce (England)

6 August 2022	South Africa	26–10	New Zealand	Mbombela Stadium, Mbombela
17:05 SAST (UTC+2)	Try: Kurt-Lee Arendse; Willie le Roux; Con: Handre Pollard 2 Pen: Handre Pollard 3 Drop: Handre Pollard			Attendance: 42,367; Referee: Angus Gardner (Australia)

16 July 2022	South Africa	30–14	Wales	DHL Stadium, Cape Town
17:05 SAST (UTC+2)	Try: Handre Pollard; Bongi Mbonambi; Siya Kolisi; Con: Handre Pollard 3 Pen: Handre Pollard 3			Attendance: 51,347; Referee: Matthew Carley (England)

9 July 2022	South Africa	12–13	Wales	Toyota Stadium, Bloemfontein
17:05 SAST (UTC+2)	Pen: Handre Pollard 4			Attendance: 46,000; Referee: Angus Gardner (Australia)

2 July 2022	South Africa	32–29	Wales	Loftus Versfeld Stadium, Pretoria
17:05 SAST (UTC+2)	Try: Bongi Mbonambi; Malcolm Marx; Cheslin Kolbe; Penalty try Con: Damian Willemse 2 Pen: Elton Jantjies; Damian Willemse			Attendance: 51,762; Referee: Nika Amashukeli (Georgia)

=== 2021 ===
2021 record

Games played	Won	Lost	Drawn	Win percentage
13	8	5	0	61.53%

20 November 2021	England	27–26	South Africa	Twickenham Stadium, London
15:15 GMT (UTC+0)			Try: Makazole Mapimpi; Pen: Handré Pollard 5, Elton Jantjies, François Steyn	Referee: Andrew Brace (Ireland)

13 November 2021	Scotland	15–30	South Africa	Murrayfield Stadium, Edinburgh
13:00 GMT (UTC+0)			Try: Makazole Mapimpi 2 Con: Elton Jantjies; Pen: Elton Jantjies 3, Handré Pollard 2, François Steyn	Attendance: 67,144; Referee: Angus Gardner (Australia)

6 November 2021	Wales	18–23	South Africa	Millennium Stadium, Cardiff
17:30 GMT (UTC+0)			Try: Malcolm Marx; Pen: Handré Pollard 4, François Steyn, Elton Jantjies	Attendance: 70,353; Referee: Paul Williams (New Zealand)

2 October 2021	South Africa	31–29	New Zealand	Cbus Super Stadium, Gold Coast
20:05 AEST (UTC+10)	Try: Damian de Allende, Makazole Mapimpi; Pen: Handré Pollard 4, Elton Jantjies 2 Drop: Elton Jantjies			Attendance: 20,441; Referee: Matthew Carley (England)

25 September 2021	New Zealand	19–17	South Africa	North Queensland Stadium, Townsville
17:05 AEST (UTC+10)			Try: Sbu Nkosi; Pen: Handré Pollard 4	Attendance: 25,000; Referee: Luke Pearce (England)

18 September 2021	Australia	30–17	South Africa	Suncorp Stadium, Brisbane
17:05 AEST (UTC+10)			Try: Lukhanyo Am; Pen: Handré Pollard 4	Attendance: 40,000; Referee: Matthew Carley (England)

12 September 2021	South Africa	26–28	Australia	Cbus Super Stadium, Gold Coast
20:05 AEST (UTC+10)	Try: Bongi Mbonambi, Malcolm Marx 2 Con: Handré Pollard; Pen: Handré Pollard 3			Attendance: 15,191; Referee: Luke Pearce (England)

21 August 2021	Argentina	10–29	South Africa	Nelson Mandela Bay Stadium, Gqeberha
17:05 SAST (UTC+2)			Try: Makazole Mapimpi, Malcolm Marx; Con: Handré Pollard 2 Pen: Handré Pollard 5	Attendance: 0 Referee: Karl Dickson (England)

14 August 2021	South Africa	32–12	Argentina	Nelson Mandela Bay Stadium, Gqeberha
17:05 SAST (UTC+2)	Try: Cobus Reinach, Aphelele Fassi, Jaden Hendrikse; Con: Elton Jantjies; Pen: Elton Jantjies 5			Attendance: 0 Referee: Andrew Brace (Ireland)

7 August 2021	South Africa	19–16	British & Irish Lions	DHL Stadium, Cape Town
18:00 SAST (UTC+2)	Try: Cheslin Kolbe; Con: Handré Pollard; Pen: Handré Pollard 2, Morné Steyn 2			Attendance: 0 Referee: Mathieu Raynal (France)

31 July 2021	South Africa	27–9	British & Irish Lions	DHL Stadium, Cape Town
18:00 SAST (UTC+2)	Try: Makazole Mapimpi, Lukhanyo Am; Con: Handré Pollard; Pen: Handré Pollard 5			Attendance: 0 Referee: Ben O'Keeffe (New Zealand)

24 July 2021	South Africa	17–22	British & Irish Lions	DHL Stadium, Cape Town
18:00 SAST (UTC+2)	Try: Faf de Klerk; Pen: Handré Pollard 4			Attendance: 0 Referee: Nic Berry (Australia)

2 July 2021	South Africa	40–9	Georgia	Loftus Versfeld Stadium, Pretoria
19:00 SAST (UTC+2)	Try: Aphelele Fassi, Bongi Mbonambi, Cobus Reinach, Kwagga Smith, Herschel Jantjies, Malcolm Marx; Con: Handré Pollard 4, Elton Jantjies			Attendance: 0 Referee: Mike Adamson (Scotland)

== 2010s ==
2010s record

Games played	Won	Lost	Drawn	Win percentage
122	73	44	5	59.84%

=== 2019 ===
2019 record

Games played	Won	Lost	Drawn	Win percentage
12	10	1	1	83.33%

2 November 2019	South Africa	32–12	England	International Stadium Yokohama, Yokohama
18:00 JST (UTC+9)	Try: Mapimpi 66' c Kolbe 74' c Con: Pollard (2/2) 67', 75'; Pen: Pollard (6/8) 10', 26', 39', 40+3', 46', 58'			Attendance: 70,103; Referee: Jérôme Garcès (France)

27 October 2019	South Africa	19–16	Wales	International Stadium Yokohama, Yokohama
18:00 JST (UTC+9)	Try: de Allende 57' c Con: Pollard (1/1) 58'; Pen: Pollard (4/4) 15', 20', 35', 76'			Attendance: 67,750; Referee: Jérôme Garcès (France)

20 October 2019	South Africa	26–3	Japan	Ajinomoto Stadium, Tokyo
19:15 JST (UTC+9)				Referee: Wayne Barnes (England)

8 October 2019	South Africa	66–7	Canada	Noevir Stadium Kobe, Kobe
19:15 JST (UTC+9)				Referee: Luke Pearce (England)

4 October 2019	South Africa	49–3	Italy	Shizuoka Stadium, Fukuroi
18:45 JST (UTC+9)				Referee: Wayne Barnes (England)

28 September 2019	South Africa	57–3	Namibia	Toyota Stadium, Toyota
18:45 JST (UTC+9)				Referee: Mathieu Raynal (France)

21 September 2019	South Africa	13–23	New Zealand	Nissan Stadium, Yokohama
18:45 JST (UTC+9)				Referee: Jerome Garces (France)

6 September 2019	South Africa	41–7	Japan	Kumagaya Rugby Ground, Saitama
19:15 JST (UTC+9)				Referee: Nic Berry (Australia)

17 August 2019	South Africa	24–18	Argentina	Loftus Versfeld, Pretoria
17:05 SAST (UTC+2)				Attendance: 29,826; Referee: Luke Pearce (England)

10 August 2019	Argentina	13–46	South Africa	Estadio Padre Ernesto Martearena, Salta
16:40 ART (UTC-3)				Attendance: 22,190; Referee: Romain Poite (France)

27 July 2019	New Zealand	16–16	South Africa	Wellington Regional Stadium, Wellington
19:35 NZST (UTC+12)			Try: Herschel Jantjies; Con: Handre Pollard; Pen: Handre Pollard 3	Attendance: 35,213; Referee: Nic Berry (Australia)

20 July 2019	South Africa	35–17	Australia	Ellis Park Stadium, Johannesburg
17:05 SAST (UTC+2)	Try: Lood de Jager, Herschel Jantjies 2, S'bu Nkosi, Cobus Reinach; Con: Elton Jantjies 5			Referee: Paul Williams (New Zealand)

=== 2018 ===
2018 record

Games played	Won	Lost	Drawn	Win percentage
14	7	7	0	50%

24 November 2018	Wales	20–11	South Africa	Cardiff Arms Park, Cardiff
			Try: Jesse Kriel; Pen: Handre Pollard, Elton Jantjies	Referee: Luke Pearce (England)

17 November 2018	Scotland	20–26	South Africa	Murrayfield, Edinburgh
			Try: Jesse Kriel, Handre Pollard; Con: Handre Pollard 2 Pen: Handre Pollard 3, Elton Jantjies	Referee: Romain Poite (France)

10 November 2018	France	26–29	South Africa	Stade de France, Paris
			Try: S'busiso Nkosi, Bongi Mbonambi; Con: Handre Pollard 2 Pen: Handre Pollard 5	Referee: Nigel Owens (Wales)

3 November 2018	England	12–11	South Africa	Twickenham Stadium, London
			Try: S'busiso Nkosi; Pen: Handre Pollard 2	Referee: Angus Gardner (Australia)

6 October 2018	South Africa	30–32	New Zealand	Loftus Versfeld Stadium, Pretoria
	Try: Cheslin Kolbe, Jesse Kriel, Damian de Allende; Con: Handré Pollard 3 Pen: Handré Pollard 3			Referee: Angus Gardner (Australia)

29 September 2018	South Africa	23–12	Australia	Nelson Mandela Bay Stadium, Port Elizabeth
	Try: Faf de Klerk, Aphiwe Dyantyi; Con: Handré Pollard 2 Pen: Handré Pollard 3			Referee: Jérôme Garcès (France)

15 September 2018	New Zealand	34–36	South Africa	WestPac Stadium, Wellington
			Try: Malcolm Marx, Aphiwe Dyantyi 2, Willie le Roux, Cheslin Kolbe; Con: Handré Pollard 4 Pen: Handré Pollard 1	Referee: Nigel Owens (Wales)

8 September 2018	Australia	23–18	South Africa	Suncorp Stadium, Brisbane
			Try: Bongi Mbonambi, Makazole Mapimpi; Con: Handré Pollard 1 Pen: Handré Pollard 2	Referee: Glen Jackson (New Zealand)

25 August 2018	Argentina	32–19	South Africa	Estadio Malvinas Argentinas, Mendoza, Argentina
			Try: Siya Kolisi, Lionel Mapoe 2 Con: Handré Pollard 2	Referee: Angus Gardner (Australia)

18 August 2018	South Africa	34–21	Argentina	Kings Park Stadium, Durban
	Try: Faf de Klerk, Aphiwe Dyantyi 2, Lukhanyo Am, Makazole Mapimpi 2 Con: Handré Pollard 2			Referee: Ben O'Keeffe (New Zealand)

23 June 2018	South Africa	10–25	England	Newlands Stadium, Cape Town
	Try: Jesse Kriel; Con: Elton Jantjies 1 Pen: Elton Jantjies 1			Referee: Glen Jackson (New Zealand)

16 June 2018	South Africa	23–12	England	Free State Stadium, Bloemfontein
	Try: Duane Vermeulen; Con: Handre Pollard 1 Pen: Handre Pollard 3			Referee: Romain Poite (France)

9 June 2018	South Africa	42–39	England	Ellis Park Stadium, Johannesburg
	Try: Faf de Klerk, Aphiwe Dyantyi, S'busiso Nkosi 2 Con: Handre Pollard 4 Pen: Handre Pollard 3			Referee: Ben O'Keeffe (New Zealand)

2 June 2018	South Africa	20–22	Wales	RFK Stadium, Washington, D.C.
	Try: Makazole Mapimpi, Travis Ismaiel; Con: Elton Jantjies 2 Pen: Elton Jantjies 1, Robert du Preez JR 1			Referee: Matthew Carley (England)

=== 2017 ===
2017 record

Games played	Won	Lost	Drawn	Win percentage
13	7	4	2	53.85%

2 December 2017	Wales	24–22	South Africa	Cardiff Arms Park, Cardiff
			Try: Handre Pollard, Warrick Gelant, Jesse Kriel; Con: Handre Pollard 2 Pen: Handre Pollard	Referee: Jérôme Garcès (France) (France)

25 November 2017	Italy	6–35	South Africa	Stadio Euganeo, Padua
	Pen: Canna (2/3) 10', 19'		Try: F. Louw 13' c Mbonambi 23' c Venter 33' c Kitshoff 43' c Mostert 75' c Con: Pollard (4/4) 15', 24', 34', 44'; Jantjies (1/1) 77'	Attendance: 23,595; Referee: Romain Poite (France)

18 November 2017	France	17–18	South Africa	Stade de France, Paris
			Try: Jesse Kriel, Dillyn Leyds; Con: Handre Pollard 1 Pen: Handre Pollard 2	Referee: Nigel Owens (Wales)

11 November 2017	Ireland	38–3	South Africa	Aviva Stadium, Dublin
			Pen: Elton Jantjies	Referee: Ben O'Keeffe (New Zealand)

7 October 2017	South Africa	24–25	New Zealand	Newlands Stadium, Cape Town
	Try: Malcolm Marx, Ross Cronjé, Jean-Luc du Preez; Con: Elton Jantjies 2, Handre Pollard 1 Pen: Elton Jantjies 1			Referee: Jerome Garces (France)

30 September 2017	South Africa	27–27	Australia	Free State Stadium, Bloemfontein
	Try: Ruan Dreyer, Courtnall Skosan, Jan Serfontein; Con: Elton Jantjies 3 Pen: Elton Jantjies 1			Referee: Ben O'Keeffe (New Zealand)

16 September 2017	New Zealand	57–0	South Africa	North Harbour Stadium
				Referee: Nigel Owens (Wales)

9 September 2017	Australia	23–23	South Africa	Perth Oval, Perth
			Try: Malcolm Marx, Jesse Kriel; Con: Elton Jantjies 2 Pen: Elton Jantjies 2	Referee: Glen Jackson (New Zealand)

26 August 2017	Argentina	23–41	South Africa	Estadio Padre Ernesto Martearena, Salta
			Try: Siya Kolisi 2, Elton Jantjies, Jean-Luc du Preez; Con: Elton Jantjies 5 Pen: Elton Jantjies 2	Referee: Pascal Gauzère (France)

19 August 2017	South Africa	37–15	Argentina	Nelson Mandela Bay Stadium, Port Elizabeth
	Try: Siya Kolisi, Courtnall Skosan, Raymond Rhule, Pieter-Steph du Toit; Con: Elton Jantjies 4 Pen: Elton Jantjies 3			Referee: Romain Poite (France)

24 June 2017	South Africa	35–12	France	Ellis Park Stadium, Johannesburg
	Try: Malcolm Marx, Eben Etzebeth, Jesse Kriel, Rudy Paige; Con: Elton Jantjies 3 Pen: Elton Jantjies 3			Referee: Angus Gardner (Australia)

17 June 2017	South Africa	37–15	France	Kings Park Stadium, Durban
	Try: Siya Kolisi, Elton Jantjies, Jan Serfontein, Coenie Oosthuizen; Con: Elton Jantjies 4 Pen: Elton Jantjies 3			Referee: Ben O'Keeffe (New Zealand)

10 June 2017	South Africa	37–14	France	Loftus Versfeld Stadium, Pretoria
	Try: Ross Cronjé, Jan Serfontein, Jesse Kriel; Con: Elton Jantjies 4 Pen: Elton Jantjies 3			Referee: Glen Jackson (New Zealand)

=== 2016 ===
2016 record

Games played	Won	Lost	Drawn	Win percentage
12	4	8	0	25%

26 November 2016	Wales	27–13	South Africa	Cardiff Arms Park, Cardiff
			Try: Uzair Cassiem; Con: Patrick Lambie; Pen: Elton Jantjies 2	Referee: Romain Poite (France)

19 November 2016	Italy	20–18	South Africa	Stadio Artemio Franchi, Florence
			Try: Bryan Habana, Damian de Allende; Con: Patrick Lambie; Pen: Patrick Lambie, Elton Jantjies	Referee: George Clancy (France)

12 November 2016	England	37–21	South Africa	Twickenham Stadium, London
			Try: Willie le Roux, Johan Goosen; Con: Ruan Combrinck; Pen: Patrick Lambie 2 Drop: Patrick Lambie	Referee: Jerome Garces (France)

8 October 2016	South Africa	15–57	New Zealand	Kings Park Stadium, Durban
	Pen: Morné Steyn 5			Referee: Jerome Garces (France)

1 October 2016	South Africa	18–10	Australia	Loftus Versfeld Stadium, Pretoria
	Pen: Morné Steyn 4 Drop: Morné Steyn 2			Referee: Wayne Barnes (England)

17 September 2016	New Zealand	41–13	South Africa	Rugby League Park, Christchurch
			Try: Bryan Habana; Con: Elton Jantjies; Pen: Elton Jantjies 2	Referee: Angus Gardner (Australia)

10 September 2016	Australia	23–17	South Africa	Suncorp Stadium, Brisbane
			Try: Warren Whiteley, Johan Goosen; Con: Elton Jantjies 2 Pen: Morné Steyn 1	Referee: Nigel Owens (Wales)

27 August 2016	Argentina	26–24	South Africa	Estadio Padre Ernesto Martearena, Salta
			Try: Bryan Habana, Pieter-Steph du Toit; Con: Elton Jantjies 2 Johan Goosen; Pen: Morné Steyn 2 Elton Jantjies 2	Referee: Jerome Garces (France)

20 August 2016	South Africa	30–23	Argentina	Mbombela Stadium, Mbombela
	Try: Warren Whiteley, Ruan Combrinck, Johan Goosen; Con: Elton Jantjies 3 Pen: Elton Jantjies 3			Referee: Glen Jackson (New Zealand)

25 June 2016	South Africa	19–13	Ireland	Nelson Mandela Bay Stadium, Port Elizabeth
	Try: JP Pietersen; Con: Elton Jantjies; Pen: Elton Jantjies 3, Ruan Combrinck 1			Referee: Glen Jackson (New Zealand)

18 June 2016	South Africa	32–26	Ireland	Ellis Park Stadium, Johannesburg
	Try: Pieter-Steph du Toit, Damian de Allende, Ruan Combrinck, Warren Whiteley; Con: Elton Jantjies 3 Pen: Elton Jantjies 2			Referee: Angus Garnder (Australia)

11 June 2016	South Africa	20–26	Ireland	Newlands Stadium, Cape Town
	Try: Pieter-Steph du Toit, Lwazi Mvovo; Con: Elton Jantjies 2 Pen: Elton Jantjies, Patrick Lambie			Referee: Mathieu Raynal (France)

=== 2015 ===
2015 record

Games played	Won	Lost	Drawn	Win percentage
11	6	5	0	54.55%

30 October 2015	South Africa	24–13	Argentina	London Stadium, London
	Try: Eben Etzebeth, JP Pietersen; Con: Handre Pollard; Pen: Handre Pollard 4			Referee: John Lacey (Ireland)

24 October 2015	South Africa	18–20	New Zealand	Twickenham Stadium, London
	Pen: Handre Pollard 4, Patrick Lambie			Referee: Jerome Graces (France)

17 October 2015	South Africa	23–19	Wales	Twickenham Stadium, London
	Try: Fourie du Preez; Pen: Handre Pollard 5 Drop: Handre Pollard			Referee: Wayne Barnes (England)

7 October 2015	South Africa	64–0	United States	London Stadium, London
	Try: Bismarck du Plessis, Francois Louw, Lwazi Mvovo, Damian de Allende, Jesse Kriel, Bryan Habana 3 Con: Handre Pollard 4, Morné Steyn 3			Referee: Pascal Gauzère (France)

3 October 2015	South Africa	34–16	Scotland	St James' Park, Newcastle
	Try: Schalk Burger, Bryan Habana, JP Pietersen; Con: Handre Pollard 2 Pen: Handre Pollard 4 Drop: Handre Pollard			Referee: Nigel Owens (Wales)

26 September 2015	South Africa	46–6	Samoa	Villa Park, Birmingham
	Try: Schalk Burger, Bryan Habana, JP Pietersen 3, Schalk Brits; Con: Handre Pollard, Patrick Lambie			Referee: Wayne Barnes (England)

19 September 2015	South Africa	32–34	Japan	Falmer Stadium, Brighton and Hove
	Try: Bismarck du Plessis, Lood de Jager, Francois Louw, Adriaan Strauss; Con: Patrick Lambie 2, Handre Pollard 1 Pen: Patrick Lambie, Handre Pollard			Referee: Jérôme Garcès (France)

15 August 2015	Argentina	12–26	South Africa	José Amalfitani Stadium, Buenos Aires
			Try: Lwazi Mvovo, Bryan Habana; Con: Patrick Lambie 2 Pen: Patrick Lambie 3 Drop: Patrick Lambie	Referee: Glen Jackson (New Zealand)

8 August 2015	South Africa	25–37	Argentina	Kings Park Stadium, Durban
	Try: Lood de Jager, Bryan Habana, Willie le Roux; Con: Handre Pollard 2 Pen: Handre Pollard 2			Referee: Romain Poite (France)

25 July 2015	South Africa	20–27	New Zealand	Ellis Park Stadium, Johannesburg
	Try: Jesse Kriel, Willie le Roux; Con: Handre Pollard 2 Pen: Handre Pollard 2			Referee: Jerome Garces (France)

18 July 2015	Australia	24–20	South Africa	Lang Park, Brisbane
			Try: Eben Etzebeth, Jesse Kriel; Con: Handre Pollard 2 Pen: Handre Pollard 2	Referee: Nigel Owens (Wales)

=== 2014 ===
2014 record

Games played	Won	Lost	Drawn	Win percentage
13	9	4	0	69%

29 November 2014	Wales	12–6	South Africa	Cardiff Arms Park, Cardiff
			Pen: Patrick Lambie 2	Referee: John Lacey (Ireland)

22 November 2014	Italy	6–22	South Africa	Stadio Euganeo, Padua
			Try: Coenie Oosthuizen, Cobus Reinach, Bryan Habana; Con: Handre Pollard 2 Pen: Patrick Lambie	Referee: Jerome Garces (France)

15 November 2014	England	28–31	South Africa	Twickenham, London
			Try: Schalk Burger, Cobus Reinach, Jan Serfontein; Con: Patrick Lambie 2 Pen: Patrick Lambie 3 Drop: Patrick Lambie	Referee: Steve Walsh (New Zealand)

8 November 2014	Ireland	29–15	South Africa	Aviva Stadium, Dublin
			Try: Marcell Coetzee, JP Pietersen; Con: Handre Pollard; Pen: Handre Pollard	Referee: Romian Poite (France)

4 October 2014	South Africa	27–25	New Zealand	Ellis Park Stadium, Johannesburg
	Try: Francois Hougaard, Handre Pollard 2 Con: Handre Pollard 3 Pen: Handre Pollard, Patrick Lambie			Referee: Wayne Barnes (England)

27 September 2014	South Africa	28–10	Australia	Newlands Stadium, Cape Town
	Try: Marcell Coetzee, Jean de Villiers 2, Pat Lambie; Con: Pat Lambie; Pen: Handre Pollard; Drop: Pat Lambie			Referee: Nigel Owens (Wales)

13 September 2014	New Zealand	14–10	South Africa	WestPac Stadium, Wellington
			Try: Cornal Hendricks; Con: Handre Pollard; Drop: Handre Pollard	Referee: Jerome Garces (France)

6 September 2014	Australia	24–23	South Africa	Subiaco Oval, Perth
			Try: Cornal Hendricks; Pen: Morné Steyn 6	Referee: George Clancy (Ireland)

23 August 2014	Argentina	31–33	South Africa	Estadio Padre Ernesto Martearena, Salta
			Try: Bryan Habana, Cornal Hendricks, Marcell Coetzee; Con: Handre Pollard, Morné Steyn 2 Pen: Handre Pollard 3, Morné Steyn	Referee: Steve Walsh (New Zealand)

16 August 2014	South Africa	13–6	Argentina	Loftus Versfeld Stadium, Pretoria
	Try: Ruan Pienaar; Con: Handre Pollard; Pen: Handre Pollard, Morné Steyn			Referee: John Lacey (Ireland)

28 June 2014	South Africa	55–6	Scotland	Nelson Mandela Bay Stadium, Port Elizabeth
	Try: Lood de Jager 2, Marcell Coetzee 2, Lwazi Mvovo 2, JP Pietersen, Willie le Roux; Con: Handre Pollard 5, Marnitz Boshoff; Pen: Handre Pollard			Referee: Glen Jackson (New Zealand)

21 June 2014	South Africa	31–30	Wales	Mbombela Stadium, Mbombela
	Try: Cornal Hendricks, Willie le Roux; Con: Morné Steyn 4 Pen: Morné Steyn			Referee: Steve Walsh (New Zealand)

14 June 2014	South Africa	38–16	Wales	Kings Park Stadium, Durban
	Try: Duane Vermeulen, Bryan Habana 2, Cornal Hendricks, Willie le Roux; Con: Morné Steyn 5 Pen: Morné Steyn			Referee: Romaine Poite (France)

=== 2013 ===
2013 record

Games played	Won	Lost	Drawn	Win percentage
12	10	2	0	83%

23 November 2013	France	10–19	South Africa	Stade de France, Paris
			Try: JP Pietersen; Con: Morné Steyn; Pen: Morné Steyn 3, Patrick Lambie	Referee: Wayne Barnes (England)

17 November 2013	Scotland	0–28	South Africa	Murrayfield, Edinburgh
			Try: Willem Alberts, JP Pietersen, Willie le Roux, Coenie Oosthuizen; Con: Patrick Lambie 4	Referee: Jerome Garces (France)

9 November 2013	Wales	15–24	South Africa	Cardiff Arms Park, Cardiff
			Try: Bismarck du Plessis, Fourie du Preez, Jean de Villiers; Con: Morné Steyn 2, Patrick Lambie; Pen: Morné Steyn	Referee: Alain Rolland (Ireland)

5 October 2013	South Africa	27–38	New Zealand	Ellis Park Stadium, Johannesburg
	Try: Bryan Habana 2, Jean de Villiers, Willie le Roux; Con: Morné Steyn 2 Pen: Morné Steyn			Referee: Nigel Owens (Wales)

28 September 2013	South Africa	28–8	Australia	Newlands Stadium, Cape Town
	Try: Adriaan Strauss, Willie le Roux, Zane Kirchner; Con: Morné Steyn 2 Pen: Morné Steyn 3			Referee: Jerome Garces (France)

14 September 2013	New Zealand	29–15	South Africa	Eden Park, Auckland
			Try: Bismarck du Plessis, Patrick Lambie; Con: Morné Steyn; Pen: Morné Steyn	Referee: Romain Poite (France)

7 September 2013	Australia	12–38	South Africa	Lang Park, Brisbane
			Try: Jean de Villiers, Willie le Roux, Zane Kirchner, Coenie Oosthuizen; Con: Morné Steyn 3 Pen: Morné Steyn 4	Referee: George Clancy (Ireland)

24 August 2013	Argentina	17–22	South Africa	Estadio Malvinas Argentinas, Mendoza
			Try: Bjorn Basson; Con: Morné Steyn 1 Pen: Morné Steyn 5	Referee: Steve Walsh (New Zealand)

17 August 2013	South Africa	73–13	Argentina	FNB Stadium, Soweto
	Try: Adriaan Strauss, Willem Alberts, Duane Vermeulen, Bryan Habana, Jean de Villiers, JJ Engelbrecht, Fourie du Preez, Bismarck du Plessis; Con: Morné Steyn 8 Pen: Morné Steyn4			Referee: Chris Pollock (New Zealand)

22 June 2013	South Africa	56–23	Samoa	Loftus Versfeld Stadium, Pretoria
	Try: JJ Engelbrecht, Francois Louw 2, Morné Steyn, Bryan Habana 2, Trevor Nyakane; Con: Morné Steyn 3, Patrick Lambie 2 Pen: Morné Steyn2			Referee: Pascal Gauzère (France)

15 June 2013	South Africa	30–17	Scotland	Mbombela Stadium, Mbombela
	Try: JJ Engelbrecht, Jan Serfontein; Con: Morné Steyn 2 Patrick Lambie; Pen: Morné Steyn2 Patrick Lambie			Referee: Romain Poite (France)

8 June 2013	South Africa	44–10	Italy	Kings Park Stadium, Durban
	Try: Adriaan Strauss, Bjorn Basson, Jean de Villiers, JJ Engelbrecht, Bryan Habana; Con: Morné Steyn 4 Patrick Lambie; Pen: Morné Steyn 3			Referee: Pascal Gauzère (France)

=== 2012 ===
2012 record

Games played	Won	Lost	Drawn	Win percentage
12	7	3	2	58%

24 November 2012	England	15–16	South Africa	Twickenham, London
			Try: Willem Alberts; Con: Patrick Lambie; Pen: Patrick Lambie 2	Referee: Nigel Owens (Wales)

17 November 2012	Scotland	10–21	South Africa	Murrayfield, Edinburgh
			Try: Adriaan Strauss 2 Con: Patrick Lambie; Pen: Patrick Lambie 3	Referee: George Clancy (Ireland)

10 November 2012	Ireland	12–16	South Africa	Aviva Stadium, Dublin
			Try: Ruan Pienaar; Con: Patrick Lambie; Pen: Patrick Lambie 3	Referee: Wayne Barnes (England)

6 October 2012	South Africa	16- 32	New Zealand	FNB Stadium, Soweto
	Try: Bryan Habana; Con: Johan Goosen; Pen: Johan Goosen, Elton Jantjies 2			Referee: Alain Rolland (Ireland)

29 September 2012	South Africa	31–8	Australia	Loftus Versfeld Stadium, Pretoria
	Try: Bryan Habana 3, Zane Kirchner, Francois Louw; Con: Ruan Pienaar 3			Referee: Alain Rolland (Ireland)

15 September 2012	New Zealand	21–11	South Africa	Forsyth Barr Stadium, Dunedin
			Try: Bryan Habana; Pen: Morné Steyn, Johan Goosen	Referee: George Clancy (Ireland)

8 September 2012	Australia	26–19	South Africa	Subiaco Oval, Perth
			Try: Bryan Habana; Con: Morné Steyn; Pen: François Steyn 2, Morné Steyn 2	Referee: Nigel Owens (Wales)

25 August 2012	Argentina	16–16	South Africa	Estadio Malvinas Argentinas, Mendoza
			Try: François Steyn; Con: Morné Steyn; Pen: Morné Steyn 3	Referee: Steve Walsh (New Zealand)

18 August 2012	South Africa	27–6	Argentina	Newlands Stadium, Cape Town
	Try: Zane Kirchner, Bryan Habana, Marcell Coetzee; Con: Morné Steyn 3 Pen: Morné Steyn 2			Referee: Steve Walsh (New Zealand)

23 June 2012	South Africa	14–14	England	Nelson Mandela Bay Stadium, Port Elizabeth
	Try: JP Pietersen; Pen: Morné Steyn 3			Referee: Steve Walsh (New Zealand)

16 June 2012	South Africa	36–27	England	Ellis Park Stadium, Johannesburg
	Try: JP Pietersen, Francois Hougaard, Willem Alberts, Bismarck du Plessis; Con: Morné Steyn 2 Pen: Morné Steyn 3 Drop: Morné Steyn			Referee: Alain Rolland (Ireland)

9 June 2012	South Africa	22–17	England	Kings Park Stadium, Durban
	Try: Jean de Villiers; Con: Morné Steyn; Pen: Morné Steyn 4			Referee: Steve Walsh (New Zealand)

=== 2011 ===
2011 record

Games played	Won	Lost	Drawn	Win percentage
9	5	4	0	56%

9 October 2011	South Africa	9–11	Australia	Wellington Regional Stadium, Wellington
			Con: Morné Steyn 2 Pen: Morné Steyn	Referee: Bryce Lawrence (New Zealand)

29 September 2011	South Africa	13–5	Samoa	North Harbour Stadium, North Shore City
	Try: Bryan Habana; Con: Morné Steyn; Pen: Morné Steyn, François Steyn			Referee: Nigel Owens (Wales)

22 September 2011	South Africa	87–0	Namibia	North Harbour Stadium, North Shore City
	Try: Juan de Jongh 2, Gio Aplon 2, Francois Hougaard 2, Jaque Fourie, François Steyn, Bryan Habana, Morné Steyn, Danie Rossouw; Con: Morné Steyn 6, Ruan Pienaar 6 Pen: Morné Steyn			Referee: George Clancy (Ireland)

17 September 2011	South Africa	49–3	Fiji	Wellington Regional Stadium, Wellington
	Try: Tendai Mtawarira, Jaque Fourie, François Steyn, Morné Steyn, Danie Rossouw, Gürthro Steenkamp; Con: Morné Steyn 5 Pen: Morné Steyn 2			Referee: Romain Poite (France)

11 September 2011	South Africa	17–16	Wales	Wellington Regional Stadium, Wellington
	Try: Francois Hougaard, François Steyn; Con: Morné Steyn 2 Pen: Morné Steyn			Referee: Wayne Barnes (England)

20 August 2011	South Africa	18–5	New Zealand	Nelson Mandela Bay Stadium, Port Elizabeth
	Pen: Morné Steyn 5 Drop: Morné Steyn			Referee: George Clancy (Ireland)

13 August 2011	South Africa	9 -14	Australia	Kings Park Stadium, Durban
	Pen: Butch James 2, François Steyn			Referee: Bryce Lawrence (New Zealand)

30 July 2011	New Zealand	40–7	South Africa	Wellington Regional Stadium, Wellington
			Try: John Smit; Con: Morné Steyn	Referee: Alain Rolland (Ireland)

23 July 2011	Australia	39–20	South Africa	Stadium Australia, Sydney
			Try: John Smit, Chilliboy Ralepelle; Con: Patrick Lambie 2 Pen: Morné Steyn 2	Referee: Chris Pollock (New Zealand)

=== 2010 ===
2010 record

Games played	Won	Lost	Drawn	Win percentage
14	8	6	0	57%

27 November 2010	England	11–21	South Africa	Twickenham, London
			Try: Willem Alberts, Lwazi Mvovo; Con: Morné Steyn; Pen: Morné Steyn 3	Referee: George Clancy (Ireland)

20 November 2010	Scotland	21–17	South Africa	Murrayfield, Edinburgh
			Try: Willem Alberts; Pen: Morné Steyn 4	Referee: Stuart Dickinson (Australia)

13 November 2010	Wales	25–29	South Africa	Cardiff Arms Park, Cardiff
			Try: Willem Alberts, Victor Matfield; Con: Morné Steyn 2 Pen: Morné Steyn 5	Referee: Steve Walsh (New Zealand)

6 November 2010	Ireland	21–23	South Africa	Aviva Stadium, Dublin
			Try: Gio Aplon, Juan Smith; Con: Morné Steyn, Patrick Lambie; Pen: Morné Steyn 3	Referee: Nigel Owens (Wales)

4 September 2010	South Africa	39–41	Australia	Free State Stadium, Bloemfontein
	Try: Gürthro Steenkamp, Jean de Villiers, Jaque Fourie; Con: Morné Steyn 3 Pen: Morné Steyn 6			Referee: Wayne Barnes (England)

28 August 2010	South Africa	44–31	Australia	Loftus Versfeld, Pretoria
	Try: Gürthro Steenkamp, Juan Smith, Pierre Spies, JP Pietersen, François Steyn; Con: Morné Steyn 4, Butch James; Pen: Morné Steyn 2, François Steyn			Referee: Alain Rolland (Ireland)

21 August 2010	South Africa	22–29	New Zealand	FNB Stadium, Soweto
	Try: Schalk Burger; Con: Morné Steyn; Pen: Morné Steyn 5			Referee: Nigel Owens (Wales)

24 July 2010	Australia	30–13	South Africa	Lang Park, Brisbane
			Try: Gürthro Steenkamp, Jaque Fourie; Pen: Morné Steyn	Referee: George Clancy (Ireland)

17 July 2010	New Zealand	31–17	South Africa	Wellington Regional Stadium, Wellington
			Try: Danie Rossouw, Schalk Burger; Con: Morné Steyn 2 Pen: Morné Steyn	Referee: Alain Rolland (Ireland)

10 July 2010	New Zealand	32–12	South Africa	Eden Park, Auckland
			Pen: Morné Steyn 4	Referee: Alan Lewis (Ireland)

26 June 2010	South Africa	55–11	Italy	Buffalo City Stadium, East London
	Try: Flip van der Merwe, BJ Botha, Bryan Habana, Morné Steyn 2, Pierre Spies, Jannie du Plessis			Referee: Andrew Small (England)

19 June 2010	South Africa	29–13	Italy	Witbank Stadium, Witbank
	Try: Francois Louw, Morné Steyn, Zane Kirchner, Bryan Habana; Con: Morné Steyn 3 Pen: Morné Steyn			Referee: Andrew Small (England)

12 June 2010	South Africa	42–17	France	Newlands Stadium, Cape Town
	Try: Gio Aplon 2, Pierre Spies, Francois Louw, Gürthro Steenkamp; Con: Morné Steyn 3, Ruan Pienaar; Pen: Morné Steyn 3			Referee: Bryce Lawrence (New Zealand)

5 June 2010	South Africa	34–31	Wales	Cardiff Arms Park, Cardiff
	Try: Juan de Jongh, Odwa Ndungane, Dewald Potgieter; Con: Ruan Pienaar 2 Pen: Ruan Pienaar 4, François Steyn			Referee: Alan Lewis (Ireland)

== 2000s ==
2000s record

Games played	Won	Lost	Drawn	Win percentage
125	76	47	2	60.8%

=== 2009 ===
2009 record

Games played	Won	Lost	Drawn	Win percentage
12	8	4	0	67%

28 November 2009	Ireland	15–10	South Africa	Croke Park, Dublin
			Try: Schalk Burger; Con: Morné Steyn; Drop: Morné Steyn	Referee: Nigel Owens (Wales)

21 November 2009	Italy	10–32	South Africa	Stadio Friuli, Udine
			Try: Wynand Olivier, Jaque Fourie, Bryan Habana, Fourie du Preez; Con: Morné Steyn 2, Ruan Pienaar; Pen: Morné Steyn 2	Referee: Alain Rolland (Ireland)

13 November 2009	France	20–13	South Africa	Stadium Municipal, Toulouse
			Try: John Smit; Con: Morné Steyn; Pen: Morné Steyn; Drop: Morné Steyn	Referee: Wayne Barnes (England)

12 September 2009	New Zealand	29–32	South Africa	Waikato Stadium, Hamilton
			Try: Jean de Villiers, Fourie du Preez; Con: Morné Steyn 2 Pen: Morné Steyn 2, François Steyn 3 Drop: Morné Steyn	Referee: Nigel Owens (Wales)

5 September 2009	Australia	21–6	South Africa	Lang Park, Brisbane
			Pen: Morné Steyn; Drop: Morné Steyn	Referee: Wayne Barnes (England)

29 August 2009	Australia	25–32	South Africa	Subiaco Oval, Perth
			Try: Jaque Fourie, Bryan Habana 2, Fourie du Preez; Con: Morné Steyn 3 Pen: Morné Steyn 2	Referee: Bryce Lawrence (New Zealand)

8 August 2009	South Africa	29–17	Australia	Newlands Stadium, Cape Town
	Try: Victor Matfield; Pen: Morné Steyn 7 Drop: Morné Steyn			Referee: Alain Rolland (Ireland)

1 August 2009	South Africa	31–19	New Zealand	Kings Park Stadium, Durban
	Try: Morné Steyn; Con: Morné Steyn; Pen: Morné Steyn 8			Referee: Nigel Owens (Wales)

25 July 2009	South Africa	28–19	New Zealand	Free State Stadium, Bloemfontein
	Try: Ruan Pienaar, Jaque Fourie; Pen: Ruan Pienaar, François Steyn 2, Morné Steyn 3			Referee: Alain Rolland (Ireland)

4 July 2009	South Africa	9–28	British & Irish Lions	Ellis Park Stadium, Johannesburg
	Pen: Morné Steyn 3			Referee: Stuart Dickinson (Australia)

27 June 2009	South Africa	28–25	British & Irish Lions	Loftus Versfeld, Pretoria
	Try: Bryan Habana, JP Pietersen, Jaque Fourie; Con: Morné Steyn 2 Pen: Morné Steyn 2, François Steyn			Referee: Christophe Berdos (France)

20 June 2009	South Africa	26–21	British & Irish Lions	Kings Park Stadium, Durban
	Try: John Smit, Heinrich Brüssow; Con: Ruan Pienaar 2 Pen: Ruan Pienaar 3, François Steyn			Referee: Bryce Lawrence (New Zealand)

=== 2008 ===
2008 record

Games played	Won	Lost	Drawn	Win percentage
13	9	4	0	69%

22 November 2008	England	6–42	South Africa	Twickenham, London
			Try: Danie Rossouw, Ruan Pienaar, Bryan Habana, Adrian Jacobs; Con: Ruan Pienaar 3, François Steyn; Pen: Ruan Pienaar 3	Referee: Nigel Owens (Wales)

15 November 2008	Scotland	10–14	South Africa	Murrayfield, Edinburgh
			Try: Jaque Fourie; Pen: Ruan Pienaar 3	Referee: Dave Pearson (England)

8 November 2008	Wales	15–20	South Africa	Cardiff Arms Park, Cardiff
			Try: Adrian Jacobs, Jean de Villiers; Con: Ruan Pienaar 2 Pen: Ruan Pienaar 2	Referee: Alain Rolland (Ireland)

30 August 2008	South Africa	53–8	Australia	Ellis Park Stadium, Johannesburg
	Try: Andries Bekker, Jongi Nokwe 4, Adrian Jacobs, Odwa Ndungane, Ruan Pienaar; Con: Butch James 3, Percy Montgomery 2 Pen: Butch James			Referee: Bryce Lawrence (New Zealand)

23 August 2008	South Africa	15–27	Australia	Kings Park Stadium, Durban
	Try: Adrian Jacobs 2 Con: Percy Montgomery; Pen: Butch James			Referee: Lyndon Bray (New Zealand)

16 August 2008	South Africa	0–19	New Zealand	Newlands Stadium, Cape Town
				Referee: Matt Goddard (Australia)

9 August 2008	South Africa	63–9	Argentina	Ellis Park Stadium, Johannesburg
	Try: Joe van Niekerk 2, Fourie du Preez, JP Pietersen 2, Adrian Jacobs, Jongi Nokwe, Pierre Spies, Bismarck du Plessis; Con: Butch James 9			Referee: Wayne Barnes (England)

19 July 2008	Australia	16–9	South Africa	Subiaco Oval, Perth
			Pen: François Steyn 2, Butch James	Referee: Bryce Lawrence (New Zealand)

12 July 2008	New Zealand	28–30	South Africa	Carisbrook, Dunedin
			Try: Ricky Januarie, JP Pietersen; Con: François Steyn; Pen: Butch James 2, Percy Montgomery 3 Drop: Butch James	Referee: Matt Goddard (Australia)

5 July 2008	New Zealand	19–8	South Africa	Wellington Stadium, Wellington
			Try: Bryan Habana; Pen: Butch James	Referee: Stuart Dickinson (Australia)

21 June 2008	South Africa	26–0	Italy	Newlands Stadium, Cape Town
	Try: Tendai Mtawarira, Bismarck du Plessis 2, François Steyn; Con: François Steyn 3			Referee: George Clancy (Ireland)

14 June 2008	South Africa	37–21	Wales	Loftus Versfeld, Pretoria
	Try: Bismarck du Plessis, Jean de Villiers 2, Ricky Januarie; Con: Butch James 4 Pen: Butch James 3			Referee: Lyndon Bray (New Zealand)

7 June 2008	South Africa	43–17	Wales	Free State Stadium, Bloemfontein
	Try: Percy Montgomery, Conrad Jantjes, Jean de Villiers, Pierre Spies; Con: Butch James 4 Pen: Butch James 5			Referee: Dave Pearson (England)

=== 2007 ===
2007 record

Games played	Won	Lost	Drawn	Win percentage
17	14	3	0	82%

24 November 2007	Wales	12–34	South Africa	Cardiff Arms Park, Cardiff
			Try: Juan Smith, Jaque Fourie 2, Ryan Kankowski, JP Pietersen; Con: André Pretorius 3 Pen: François Steyn	Referee: Chris White (England)

20 October 2007	South Africa	15–6	England	Stade De France, Paris
	Pen: Percy Montgomery 4, François Steyn		Pen: Jonny Wilkinson 2	Referee: Alain Rolland (Ireland)

14 October 2007	South Africa	37–13	Argentina	Stade De France, Paris
	Try: Bryan Habana 2, Fourie du Preez, Danie Rossouw; Con: Percy Montgomery 4 Pen: Percy Montgomery 3			Referee: Steve Walsh (New Zealand)

7 October 2007	South Africa	37–20	Fiji	Stade Vélodrome, Marseille
	Try: John Smit, Juan Smith, Butch James, Jaque Fourie, JP Pietersen; Con: Percy Montgomery 3 Pen: François Steyn, Percy Montgomery			Referee: Alan Lewis (Ireland)

30 September 2007	South Africa	64–15	United States	Stade de la Mosson, Montpellier
	Try: Schalk Burger, Fourie du Preez, Jaque Fourie 2, Bryan Habana 2, Juan Smith, François Steyn, CJ van der Linde; Con: Butch James 2, Percy Montgomery 6 Pen: Percy Montgomery			Referee: Tony Spreadbury (England)

22 September 2007	South Africa	30–25	Tonga	Stade de la Mosson, Montpellier
	Try: Bob Skinstad, Ruan Pienaar 2, Juan Smith; Con: Percy Montgomery, André Pretorius; Pen: Percy Montgomery			Referee: Tony Spreadbury (England)

14 September 2007	South Africa	36–0	England	Stade de France, Paris
	Try: Juan Smith, JP Pietersen 2 Con: Percy Montgomery 3 Pen: Percy Montgomery 4, François Steyn			Referee: Joel Jutge (France)

9 September 2007	South Africa	59–7	Samoa	Parc des Princes, Paris
	Try: Bryan Habana 4, Jaque Fourie, JP Pietersen, Percy Montgomery 2 Con: Percy Montgomery 5 Pen: Percy Montgomery 3			Referee: Paul Honiss (New Zealand)

25 August 2007	Scotland	3–27	South Africa	Murrayfield, Edinburgh
			Try: Fourie du Preez, Bryan Habana, Jaque Fourie; Con: Percy Montgomery 3 Pen: Percy Montgomery 2	Referee: Christophe Berdos (France)

15 August 2007	South Africa	105–13	Namibia	Newlands Stadium, Cape Town
	Try: Os du Randt, CJ van der Linde, Schalk Burger 3, Juan Smith 3, JP Pietersen, Jean de Villiers, Jaque Fourie, Ashwin Willemse, Percy Montgomery, Bismarck du Plessis, Ruan Pienaar; Con: Percy Montgomery 12; Pen: Percy Montgomery 2			Referee: Jonathan Kaplan (South Africa)

14 July 2007	New Zealand	33–6	South Africa	Jade Stadium, Christchurch
			Pen: Derick Hougaard 2	Referee: Stuart Dickinson (Australia)

7 July 2007	Australia	25–17	South Africa	Stadium Australia, Sydney
			Try: Wikus van Heerden, Breyton Paulse; Con: Derick Hougaard 2 Pen: Derick Hougaard	Referee: Paul Honiss (New Zealand)

23 June 2007	South Africa	21–26	New Zealand	Kings Park Stadium, Durban
	Try: Schalk Burger, Butch James; Con: Percy Montgomery; Pen: Ruan Pienaar, Percy Montgomery 2			Referee: Alain Rolland (Ireland)

16 June 2007	South Africa	22–19	Australia	Newlands Stadium, Cape Town
	Try: Jaque Fourie; Con: Percy Montgomery; Pen: Percy Montgomery 3 Drop: François Steyn 2			Referee: Wayne Barnes (England)

9 June 2007	South Africa	35–8	Samoa	Ellis Park Stadium, Johannesburg
	Try: John Smit, JP Pietersen, François Steyn, Pedrie Wannenburg, Percy Montgomery; Con: Derick Hougaard, Percy Montgomery; Pen: Derick Hougaard 2			Referee: Malcolm Changleng (Scotland)

2 June 2007	South Africa	55–22	England	Loftus Versfeld, Pretoria
	Try: Bakkies Botha, Schalk Burger, Pierre Spies 2, Ricky Januarie, Bryan Habana, Percy Montgomery; Con: Butch James, Percy Montgomery 5 Pen: Percy Montgomery			Referee: Joël Jutge (France)

26 May 2007	South Africa	58–10	England	Free State Stadium, Bloemfontein
	Try: Schalk Burger, Bryan Habana 2, Jean de Villiers, Ashwin Willemse, CJ van der Linde, François Steyn; Con: Percy Montgomery 7 Pen: Percy Montgomery 3			Referee: Steve Walsh (New Zealand)

=== 2006 ===
2006 record

Games played	Won	Lost	Drawn	Win percentage
12	5	7	0	42%

10 June 2006	South Africa	36–16	Scotland	Kings Park Stadium, Durban
	Try: Schalk Burger, Breyton Paulse, André Snyman, Percy Montgomery; Con: Percy Montgomery 2 Pen: Percy Montgomery 4			Referee: Donald Courtney (Ireland)

17 June 2006	South Africa	29–15	Scotland	EPRU Stadium, Port Elizabeth
	Try: Fourie du Preez; Pen: Percy Montgomery 7, Jaco van der Westhuyzen			Referee: Tony Spreadbury (England)

24 June 2006	South Africa	26–36	France	Newlands Stadium, Cape Town
	Try: Brent Russell; Pen: Percy Montgomery 7			Referee: Stuart Dickinson (Australia)

15 July 2006	Australia	49–0	South Africa	Lang Park, Brisbane
				Referee: Paul Honiss (New Zealand)

22 July 2006	New Zealand	35–17	South Africa	Wellington Regional Stadium, Wellington
			Try: Fourie du Preez, Breyton Paulse; Con: Percy Montgomery 2 Pen: Percy Montgomery	Referee: Joël Jutge (France)

8 August 2006	Australia	18–20	South Africa	Stadium Australia, Sydney
	Try: Mark Gerrard 32' c Mat Rogers 75' c Con: Stirling Mortlock (2) 32', 76'; Pen: Stirling Mortlock (2) 11', 64'		Try: Jaque Fourie 55' c Percy Montgomery 68'; Con: Butch James (1) 56'; Pen: Butch James (2) 46', 49'	Attendance: 60,522

26 August 2006	South Africa	26–45	New Zealand	Free State Stadium, Bloemfontein
	Try: Fourie du Preez, Jaque Fourie 2, Con: André Pretorius; Pen: Percy Montgomery 2, Butch James			Referee: Alan Lewis (Ireland)

2 September 2006	South Africa	21–20	New Zealand	Royal Bafokeng Stadium, Rustenburg
	Try: Pedrie Wannenburg, Bryan Habana; Con: André Pretorius; Pen: André Pretorius 3			Referee: Chris White (England)

9 September 2006	South Africa	24–16	Australia	Ellis Park Stadium, Johannesburg
	Try: Breyton Paulse, Fourie du Preez; Con: André Pretorius; Pen: André Pretorius 3 Drop: André Pretorius			Referee: Steve Walsh (New Zealand)

11 November 2006	Ireland	32–15	South Africa	Lansdowne Road, Dublin
			Try: Bryan Habana, François Steyn; Con: André Pretorius; Pen: André Pretorius	Referee: Paul Honiss (New Zealand)

18 November 2006	England	23–21	South Africa	Twickenham, London
			Try: Butch James, Akona Ndungane; Con: Butch James; Pen: Butch James 2 Drop: François Steyn	Referee: Steve Walsh (New Zealand)

25 November 2006	England	14–25	South Africa	Twickenham, London
			Try: CJ van der Linde; Con: André Pretorius; Pen: André Pretorius 2 Drop: André Pretorius 4	Referee: Alan Lewis (Ireland)

=== 2005 ===
2005 record

Games played	Won	Lost	Drawn	Win percentage
12	8	3	1	67%

26 November 2005	France	26–20	South Africa	Stade de France, Paris
			Try: Bakkies Botha, Jaque Fourie; Con: Percy Montgomery 2 Pen: Percy Montgomery, Meyer Bosman	Referee: Scott Young (Australia)

19 November 2005	Wales	16–33	South Africa	Cardiff Arms Park, Cardiff
			Try: Bryan Habana 2, Conrad Jantjes, Danie Rossouw; Con: Meyer Bosman 2 Pen: Percy Montgomery 3	Referee: Stuart Dickinson (Australia)

5 November 2005	Argentina	23–34	South Africa	José Amalfitani Stadium, Buenos Aires
			Try: Juan Smith, Jaque Fourie, Percy Montgomery; Con: Percy Montgomery 2 Pen: André Pretorius, Percy Montgomery 3 Drop: Bolla Conradie	Referee: Tony Spreadbury (England)

27 August 2005	New Zealand	31–27	South Africa	Carisbrook, Dunedin
			Try: Ricky Januarie, Bryan Habana, Jaque Fourie; Con: Percy Montgomery 3 Pen: Percy Montgomery 2	Referee: Joël Jutge (France)

20 August 2005	Australia	19–22	South Africa	Subiaco Oval, Perth
			Try: Bryan Habana 2 Pen: Percy Montgomery 3 Drop: Percy Montgomery	Referee: Alain Rolland (Ireland)

6 August 2005	South Africa	22–16	New Zealand	Newlands Stadium, Cape Town
	Try: Jean de Villiers; Con: Percy Montgomery; Pen: Percy Montgomery 4 Drop: André Pretorius			Referee: Andrew Cole (Australia)

30 July 2005	South Africa	22–16	Australia	Loftus Versfeld Stadium, Pretoria
	Try: Breyton Paulse 51' c Con: Percy Montgomery (1) 52'; Pen: Percy Montgomery (3) 3', 61', 73'; Drop: Percy Montgomery 29', Andre Pretorius 80'		Try: George Smith 40' c Con: Matt Giteau (1) 41'; Pen: Matt Giteau (3) 22', 27', 58'	Attendance: 50,000; Referee: Paul Honiss

23 July 2005	South Africa	33–20	Australia	Ellis Park Stadium, Johannesburg
	Try: Bryan Habana, Jaque Fourie, Jean de Villiers; Con: Percy Montgomery 3 Pen: Percy Montgomery 4			Referee: Steve Walsh (New Zealand)

9 July 2005	Australia	30–12	South Africa	Stadium Australia, Sydney
			Pen: Percy Montgomery 4	Referee: Kelvin Deaker (New Zealand)

25 June 2005	South Africa	27–13	France	EPRU Stadium, Port Elizabeth
	Try: Bryan Habana 2, Jean de Villiers; Con: Percy Montgomery 3 Pen: Percy Montgomery 2			Referee: Donal Courtney (Ireland)

18 June 2005	South Africa	30–30	France	Kings Park Stadium, Durban
	Try: Bryan Habana 2, Jean de Villiers; Con: Percy Montgomery 3 Pen: Percy Montgomery 2 Drop: Percy Montgomery			Referee: Alan Lewis (Ireland)

11 June 2005	South Africa	134–3	Uruguay	Buffalo City Stadium, East London
	Try: Gürthro Steenkamp, Albert van den Berg 2, Solly Tyibilika 2, Danie Rossouw, Jacques Cronjé, Ricky Januarie, Jaco van der Westhuyzen, Bryan Habana 2, Jean de Villiers 2, Marius Joubert, Tonderai Chavhanga 6, Jaque Fourie; Con: Jaco van der Westhuyzen 7, Percy Montgomery 6 Pen: Percy Montgomery			Referee: Donal Courtney (Ireland)

=== 2004 ===
2004 record

Games played	Won	Lost	Drawn	Win percentage
13	9	4	0	69%

4 December 2004	Argentina	7–39	South Africa	José Amalfitani Stadium, Buenos Aires
			Try: Jacques Cronjé, Fourie du Preez, Marius Joubert, Gaffie du Toit 2 Con: Gaffie du Toit 4 Pen: Gaffie du Toit 2	Referee: Chris White (England)

27 November 2004	Scotland	10–45	South Africa	Murrayfield, Edinburgh
			Try: Solly Tyibilika, Jaco van der Westhuyzen, Bryan Habana 2, Jaque Fourie; Con: Percy Montgomery 4 Pen: Percy Montgomery; Drop: Jaco van der Westhuyzen 3	Referee: Nigel Williams (Wales)

20 November 2004	England	32–16	South Africa	Twickenham, London
			Try: Bryan Habana; Con: Percy Montgomery; Pen: Percy Montgomery 3	Referee: Alain Rolland (Ireland)

13 November 2004	Ireland	17–12	South Africa	Lansdowne Road, Dublin
			Pen: Percy Montgomery 4	Referee: Paul Honiss (New Zealand)

6 November 2004	Wales	36–38	South Africa	Cardiff Arms Park, Cardiff
			Try: Joe van Niekerk, Jaco van der Westhuyzen, Percy Montgomery, Jean de Villiers; Con: Percy Montgomery 3 Pen: Percy Montgomery 4	Referee: Paddy O'Brien (New Zealand)

21 August 2004	South Africa	23–19	Australia	Kings Park Stadium, Durban
	Try: Victor Matfield, Joe van Niekerk, Con: Percy Montgomery 2 Pen: Percy Montgomery 3			Referee: Paddy O'Brien (New Zealand)

14 August 2004	South Africa	40–26	New Zealand	Ellis Park Stadium, Johannesburg
	Try: Jean de Villiers, Marius Joubert 3, Breyton Paulse; Con: Percy Montgomery 3 Pen: Percy Montgomery 3			Referee: Nigel Williams (Wales)

31 July 2004	Australia	30–26	South Africa	Subiaco Oval, Perth
			Try: Jaco van der Westhuyzen, Jean de Villiers, Gaffie du Toit; Con: Percy Montgomery; Pen: Percy Montgomery 3	Referee: Chris White (England)

24 July 2004	New Zealand	23–21	South Africa	Lancaster Park, Christchurch
			Try: Jacques Cronjé, Fourie du Preez, Jean de Villiers; Con: Percy Montgomery 3	Referee: Andrew Cole (Australia)

17 July 2004	Pacific Islanders	24–38	South Africa	Central Coast Stadium, Gosford
			Try: Jacques Cronjé, Jean de Villiers, Breyton Paulse; Con: Percy Montgomery 3 Pen: Percy Montgomery 4	Referee: Scott Young (Australia)

26 June 2004	South Africa	53–18	Wales	Loftus Versfeld Stadium, Pretoria
	Try: John Smit, Schalk Burger, Brent Russell 2, Wayne Julies, Breyton Paulse, Bolla Conradie; Con: Percy Montgomery 6 Pen: Percy Montgomery 2			Referee: Steve Walsh (New Zealand)

19 June 2004	South Africa	26–17	Ireland	Newlands Stadium, Cape Town
	Try: Jaque Fourie, Breyton Paulse; Con: Percy Montgomery 2 Pen: Percy Montgomery 4			Referee: Joel Jutge (France)

12 June 2004	South Africa	31–17	Ireland	Free State Stadium, Bloemfontein
	Try: Bakkies Botha 2, Pedrie Wannenburg, Wayne Julies; Con: Gaffie du Toit; Pen: Gaffie du Toit 3			Referee: Tony Spreadbury (England)

=== 2003 ===
2003 record

Games played	Won	Lost	Drawn	Win percentage
12	7	5	0	58%

8 November 2003	South Africa	9–29	New Zealand	Docklands Stadium, Melbourne
	Pen: Derick Hougaard 3			Referee: Tony Spreadbury (England)

1 November 2003	South Africa	60–10	Samoa	Lang Park, Brisbane
	Try: Joe van Niekerk, Juan Smith, Derick Hougaard, Jorrie Muller, Ashwin Willemse, Jaco van der Westhuyzen, Jaque Fourie, Neil de Kock; Con: Derick Hougaard 5, Louis Koen 2 Pen: Derick Hougaard; Drop: Derick Hougaard			Referee: Chris White (England)

24 October 2003	South Africa	46–19	Georgia	Sydney Football Stadium, Sydney
	Try: Bakkies Botha, Danie Rossouw 2, Joe van Niekerk, Derick Hougaard, Jaque Fourie, Schalk Burger; Con: Derick Hougaard 4 Pen: Derick Hougaard			Referee: Stuart Dickinson (Australia)

18 October 2003	South Africa	6–25	England	Subiaco Oval, Perth
	Pen: Louis Koen 2			Referee: Peter Marshall (Australia)

11 October 2003	South Africa	72–6	Uruguay	Subiaco Oval, Perth
	Try: Richard Bands, Bakkies Botha 2, Joe van Niekerk, Danie Rossouw, Joost van der Westhuizen 3, Thinus Delport, Jaque Fourie, Werner Greeff, Hendro Scholtz; Con: Louis Koen 5, Derick Hougaard			Referee: Paddy O'Brien (New Zealand)

9 August 2003	New Zealand	19–11	South Africa	Carisbrook, Dunedin
			Try: Richard Bands; Pen: Louis Koen 2	Referee: Peter Marhsall (Australia)

2 August 2003	Australia	29–9	South Africa	Lang Park, Brisbane
			Pen: Louis Koen 3	Referee: Paddy O'Brien (New Zealand)

19 July 2003	South Africa	16–52	New Zealand	Loftus Versfeld Stadium, Pretoria
	Try: Ashwin Willemse; Con: Louis Koen; Pen: Louis Koen 2 Drop: Louis Koen			Referee: Alain Rolland (Ireland)

12 July 2003	South Africa	26–22	Australia	Newlands Stadium, Cape Town
	Try: Victor Matfield, Brent Russell; Con: Louis Koen 2 Pen: Louis Koen 4			Referee: Steve Walsh (New Zealand)

28 June 2003	South Africa	26–25	Argentina	EPRU Stadium, Port Elizabeth
	Try: Danie Coetzee, Brent Russell; Con: Louis Koen 2 Pen: Louis Koen 4			Referee: Nigel Williams (Wales)

14 June 2003	South Africa	28 -19	Scotland	Ellis Park Stadium, Johannesburg
	Try: Stefan Terblanche; Con: Louis Koen; Pen: Louis Koen 6 Drop: Louis Koen			Referee: Scott Young (Australia)

7 June 2003	South Africa	29–25	Scotland	Kings Park Stadium, Durban
	Try: Trevor Halstead, Stefan Terblanche; Con: Louis Koen 2 Pen: Louis Koen 5			Referee: Joël Jutge (France)

=== 2002 ===
2002 record

Games played	Won	Lost	Drawn	Win percentage
11	5	6	0	45%

23 November 2002	England	53–3	South Africa	Twickenham, London
			Pen: André Pretorius	Referee: Paddy O'Brien (New Zealand)

16 November 2002	Scotland	21–6	South Africa	Murrayfield, Edinburgh
			Con: Butch James 2	Referee: Nigel Williams (Wales)

9 November 2002	France	30–10	South Africa	Stade Vélodrome, Marseille
			Try: Joe van Niekerk; Con: André Pretorius; Pen: André Pretorius	Referee: Alain Rolland (Ireland)

17 August 2002	South Africa	33–31	Australia	Ellis Park Stadium, Johannesburg
	Try: Joe van Niekerk, Brent Russell, Breyton Paulse 2, Werner Greeff; Con: Werner Greeff 4			Referee: Paddy O'Brien (New Zealand)

10 August 2002	South Africa	23–30	New Zealand	Kings Park Stadium, Durban
	Try: Neil de Kock, Con: André Pretorius 2 Pen: André Pretorius 2 Drop: André Pretorius			Referee: Dave McHugh (Ireland)

27 July 2002	Australia	38–27	South Africa	The Gabba, Brisbane
			Try: Bobby Skinstad, Marius Joubert 2, Brent Russell; Con: André Pretorius 2 Pen: André Pretorius	Referee: Steven Lander (England)

20 July 2002	New Zealand	41–20	South Africa	Wellington Regional Stadium, Wellington
			Try: Marius Joubert, Werner Greeff; Con: André Pretorius 2 Pen: André Pretorius; Drop: André Pretorius	Referee: Stuart Dickinson (Australia)

6 July 2002	South Africa	60–18	Samoa	Loftus Versfeld, Pretoria
	Try: Victor Matfield, Joe van Niekerk, De Wet Barry 2, Dean Hall 2, Werner Greeff, Delarey du Preez; Con: André Pretorius 7 Pen: André Pretorius 2			Referee: Andrew Cole (Australia)

29 June 2002	South Africa	49–29	Argentina	PAM Brink Stadium, Springs
	Try: Craig Davidson, André Pretorius, Stefan Terblanche 2, Adrian Jacobs, Bolla Conradie; Con: André Pretorius 5 Pen: André Pretorius 3			Referee: Wayne Erickson (Australia)

15 June 2002	South Africa	19–8	Wales	Newlands Stadium, Cape Town
	Try: Brent Russell, Craig Davidson; Pen: André Pretorius 3			Referee: Tony Spreadbury (England)

8 June 2002	South Africa	34–19	Wales	Free State Stadium, Bloemfontein
	Try: Victor Matfield, Bobby Skinstad, Marius Joubert, Faan Rautenbach; Con: André Pretorius 3 Pen: André Pretorius			Referee: Kelvin Deaker (New Zealand)

=== 2001 ===
2001 record

Games played	Won	Lost	Drawn	Win percentage
11	5	5	1	50%

1 December 2001	United States	20–43	South Africa	Robertson Stadium, Houston
			Try: Lukas van Biljon, Albert van den Berg, Dean Hall, Pieter Rossouw, Conrad Jantjes 2 Con: Louis Koen 5 Pen: Louis Koen 1	Referee: Didier Mené (France)

24 November 2001	England	29–9	South Africa	Twickenham, London
			Pen: Braam van Straaten 3	Referee: Stuart Dickinson (Australia)

17 November 2001	Italy	26–54	South Africa	Stadio Luigi Ferraris, Genoa
			Try: John Smit, Willie Meyer, Victor Matfield, Bobby Skinstad, Joost van der Westhuizen, Dean Hall, Trevor Halstead 2 Con: Louis Koen 2, Braam van Straaten 5	Referee: Wayne Erikson (Australia)

10 November 2001	France	20–10	South Africa	Stade de France, Paris
			Try: Pieter Rossouw; Con: Braam van Straaten; Pen: Braam van Straaten	Referee: Alan Lewis (Ireland)

25 August 2001	New Zealand	26–15	South Africa	Eden Park, Auckland
			Pen: Braam van Straaten 5	Referee: Peter Marshall (Australia)

18 August 2001	Australia	14–14	South Africa	Subiaco Oval, Perth
			Try: Mark Andrews; Pen: Braam van Straaten 3	Referee: Steve Walsh (New Zealand)

28 July 2001	South Africa	20–15	England	Loftus Versfeld, Pretoria
	Try: Bobby Skinstad; Pen: Braam van Straaten 5			Referee: Dave McHugh (Ireland)

21 July 2001	South Africa	3–12	New Zealand	Newlands Stadium, Cape Town
	Pen: Percy Montgomery			Referee: Scott Young (Australia)

30 June 2001	South Africa	60–14	Italy	EPRFU Stadium, Port Elizabeth
	Try: Mark Andrews, André Venter, Percy Montgomery, Thinus Delport, Breyton Paulse 2, Joost van der Westhuizen 2 Con: Percy Montgomery 3, Conrad Jantjes; Pen: Percy Montgomery 4			Referee: Joel Dumé (France)

23 June 2001	South Africa	20–15	France	Kings Park Stadium, Durban
	Try: Corné Krige; Pen: Butch James 5			Referee: Chris White (England)

16 June 2001	South Africa	23–32	France	Ellis Park Stadium, Johannesburg
	Try: Breyton Paulse; Pen: Percy Montgomery 6			Referee: Pablo DeLuca ( Argentina)

=== 2000 ===
2000 record

Games played	Won	Lost	Drawn	Win percentage
12	6	6	0	50%

2 December 2000	England	25–17	South Africa	Twickenham, London
			Try: Braam van Straaten; Pen: Braam van Straaten 4	Referee: Dave McHugh (Ireland)

26 November 2000	Wales	13–23	South Africa	Cardiff Arms Park Cardiff
			Try: Joost van der Westhuizen, Breyton Paulse; Con: Braam van Straaten 2 Pen: Braam van Straaten 3	Referee: Steve Walsh (New Zealand)

19 November 2000	Ireland	18–28	South Africa	Lansdowne Road, Dublin
			Try: Corné Krige, André Venter, Joost van der Westhuizen; Con: Percy Montgomery, Braam van Straaten; Pen: Percy Montgomery 2, Braam van Straaten	Referee: Steve Lander (England)

12 November 2000	Argentina	33–37	South Africa	Estadio Monumental Antonio Vespucio Liberti, Buenos Aires
			Try: Mark Andrews, Robbie Fleck, Breyton Paulse 2, Braam van Straaten; Con: Percy Montgomery 3 Pen: Braam van Straaten 2	Referee: Scott Young (Australia)

26 August 2000	South Africa	18–19	Australia	Kings Park Stadium, Durban
	Pen: Braam van Straaten 6			Referee: Paul Honiss (New Zealand)

19 August 2000	South Africa	46–40	New Zealand	Ellis Park Stadium, Johannesburg
	Try: Werner Swanepoel, Chester Williams, Thinus Delport; Con: Braam van Straaten 5 Pen: Braam van Straaten 2			Referee: Andrew Cole (Australia)

29 July 2000	Australia	26–6	South Africa	Stadium Australia, Sydney
			Pen: Braam van Straaten 2	Referee: Ed Morrison (England)

22 July 2000	New Zealand	25–12	South Africa	Lancaster Park, Christchurch
			Pen: Braam van Straaten 3 Drop: Percy Montgomery	Referee: Chris White (England)

8 July 2000	Australia	44–23	South Africa	Docklands Stadium, Melbourne
			Try: Werner Swanepoel, Breyton Paulse 2 Con: Louis Koen; Pen: Louis Koen 2	Referee: Paddy O'Brien (New Zealand)

24 June 2000	South Africa	22–27	England	Free State Stadium, Bloemfontein
	Try: Joost van der Westhuizen; Con: Percy Montgomery; Pen: Braam van Straaten 4, Percy Montgomery			Referee: Stuart Dickinson (Australia)

17 June 2000	South Africa	18–13	England	Loftus Versfeld, Pretoria
	Pen: Braam van Straaten 6			Referee: Colin Hawke (New Zealand)

10 June 2000	South Africa	51–18	Canada	Buffalo City Stadium, East London
	Try: Robbie Kempson, André Vos, De Wet Barry, Robbie Fleck 2, Breyton Paulse 2, Percy Montgomery; Con: Braam van Straaten 4 Pen: Braam van Straaten			Referee: Alan Lewis (Ireland)

== 1990s ==
1990s record

Games played	Won	Lost	Drawn	Win percentage
82	54	26	2	65.9%

=== 1999 ===
1999 record

Games played	Won	Lost	Drawn	Win percentage
13	8	5	0	62%

4 November 1999 *	South Africa	22–18	New Zealand	Cardiff Arms Park, Cardiff
	Try: Breyton Paulse; Con: Henry Honiball; Pen: Henry Honiball 3			Referee: Peter Marshall (Australia)

30 October 1999 *	South Africa	21–27	Australia	Twickenham, London
	Pen: Jannie de Beer 6 Drop: Jannie de Beer			Referee: Derek Bevan (Wales)

24 October 1999 *	South Africa	44–21	England	Stade de France, Paris
	Try: Joost van der Westhuizen, Pieter Rossouw; Con: Jannie de Beer 2 Pen: Jannie de Beer 5 Drop: Jannie de Beer 5			Referee: Jim Fleming (Scotland)

15 October 1999 *	South Africa	39–3	Uruguay	Hampden Park, Glasgow
	Try: Joost van der Westhuizen, Robbie Fleck, Deon Kayser, Albert van den Berg 2 Con: Jannie de Beer 4 Pen: Jannie de Beer 2			Referee: Peter Marshall (Australia)

10 October 1999 *	South Africa	47–3	Spain	Murrayfield, Edinburgh
	Try: Anton Leonard, André Vos 2, Werner Swanepoel, Pieter Muller, Bobby Skinstad; Con: Jannie de Beer 6			Referee: Paul Honiss (New Zealand)

3 October 1999 *	South Africa	46–29	Scotland	Murrayfield, Edinburgh
	Try: André Venter, Joost van der Westhuizen, Brendan Venter, Robbie Fleck, Deon Kayser, Ollie le Roux; Con: Jannie de Beer 5 Pen: Jannie de Beer 2			Referee: Colin Hawke (New Zealand)

14 August 1999	South Africa	10–9	Australia	Newlands Stadium, Cape Town
	Try: Robbie Fleck; Con: Jannie de Beer; Pen: Jannie de Beer			Referee: Colin Hawke (New Zealand)

7 August 1999	South Africa	18–34	New Zealand	Loftus Versfeld, Pretoria
	Try: Joost van der Westhuizen, André Snyman; Con: Gaffie du Toit; Pen: Gaffie du Toit 2			Referee: Ed Morrison (England)

17 July 1999	Australia	32–6	South Africa	Lang Park, Brisbane
			Pen: Braam van Straaten 2	Referee: Paddy O'Brien (New Zealand)

10 July 1999	New Zealand	28–0	South Africa	Carisbrook, Dunedin
				Referee: Peter Marshall (Australia)

26 June 1999	Wales	29–19	South Africa	Cardiff Arms Park, Cardiff
			Try: Werner Swanepoel, Percy Montgomery; Pen: Braam van Straaten 2, Gaffie du Toit	Referee: Ed Morrison (New Zealand)

19 June 1999	South Africa	101–0	Italy	Kings Park Stadium, Durban
	Try: Naka Drotské, André Vos, Stefan Terblanche, Robbie Fleck, Percy Montgomery, Deon Kayser 3, Charl Marais; Con: Gaffie du Toit 8, Braam van Straaten 5			Referee: Andrew Cole (Australia)

12 June 1999	South Africa	74–3	Italy	EPRFU Stadium, Port Elizabeth
	Try: Selborne Boome, Gary Teichmann, Gaffie du Toit 2, Robbie Fleck, Breyton Paulse 3, Percy Montgomery, Stefan Terblanche; Con: Gaffie du Toit 8 Pen: Gaffie du Toit 1			Referee: Andrew Cole (Australia)

=== 1998 ===
1998 record

Games played	Won	Lost	Drawn	Win percentage
12	11	1	0	92%

5 December 1998	England	13–7	South Africa	Twickenham, London
			Try: Pieter Rossouw; Con: Percy Montgomery	Referee: Paddy O'Brien (New Zealand)

28 November 1998	Ireland	13–27	South Africa	Lansdowne Road, Dublin
			Try: Rassie Erasmus, Bob Skinstad, Joost van der Westhuizen; Con: Percy Montgomery 3 Pen: Percy Montgomery 2	Referee: Clayton Thomas (Wales)

21 November 1998	Scotland	10–35	South Africa	Murrayfield, Edinburgh
			Try: Bob Skinstad, Joost van der Westhuizen, Pieter Rossouw, André Snyman, Stefan Terblanche; Con: Percy Montgomery 2 Pen: Percy Montgomery 2	Referee: Chris White (England)

14 November 1998	Wales	20–28	South Africa	Wembley Stadium, London
			Try: André Venter, Joost van der Westhuizen; Con: Franco Smith 2 Pen: Franco Smith 3	Referee: Stuart Dickinson (Australia)

22 August 1998	South Africa	29–15	Australia	Ellis Park Stadium, Johannesburg
	Try: Adrian Garvey, Bob Skinstad; Con: Percy Montgomery 2 Pen: Percy Montgomery 5			Referee: Jim Fleming (Scotland)

15 August 1998	South Africa	24–23	New Zealand	Kings Park Stadium, Durban
	Try: James Dalton, Joost van der Westhuizen, Stefan Terblanche, Bob Skinstad; Con: Percy Montgomery 2			Referee: Peter Marshall (Australia)

25 July 1998	New Zealand	3–13	South Africa	Athletic Park, Wellington
			Try: Pieter Rossouw; Con: Percy Montgomery; Pen: Percy Montgomery 2	Referee: Ed Morrison (Australia)

18 July 1998	Australia	13–14	South Africa	Subiaco Oval, Perth
			Try: Joost van der Westhuizen; Pen: Percy Montgomery	Referee: Colin Hawke (New Zealand)

4 July 1998	South Africa	18–0	England	Newlands Stadium, Cape Town
	Try: Joost van der Westhuizen, Stefan Terblanche; Con: Percy Montgomery; Pen: Percy Montgomery 2			Referee: Colin Hawke (New Zealand)

27 June 1998	South Africa	96–13	Wales	Loftus Versfeld, Pretoria
	Try: Krynauw Otto, Rassie Erasmus, André Venter 2, Joost van der Westhuizen, Franco Smith, Pieter Rossouw 3, Stefan Terblanche 2, Percy Montgomery 2, Bob Skinstad, McNeill Hendricks; Con: Percy Montgomery 9 Pen: Percy Montgomery			Referee: Paddy O'Brien (New Zealand)

20 June 1998	South Africa	33–0	Ireland	Loftus Versfeld, Pretoria
	Try: James Dalton, Rassie Erasmus, Gary Teichmann, Joost van der Westhuizen, Pieter Rossouw; Con: Percy Montgomery 4			Referee: Joel Dumé (France)

13 June 1998	South Africa	37–13	Ireland	Free State Stadium, Bloemfontein
	Try: Mark Andrews, Stefan Terblanche 4 Con: Gaffie du Toit 3 Pen: Gaffie du Toit 2			Referee: Ed Morrison (England)

=== 1997 ===
1997 record

Games played	Won	Lost	Drawn	Win percentage
13	8	5	0	62%

6 December 1997	Scotland	10–68	South Africa	Murrayfield, Edinburgh
			Try: Rassie Erasmus, André Venter, Gary Teichmann, Pieter Rossouw, André Snyman, James Small, Percy Montgomery 2, Franco Smith; Con: Percy Montgomery 8, Jannie de Beer	Referee: Patrick Thomas (France)

29 November 1997	England	11–29	South Africa	Twickenham, London
			Try: Adrian Garvey, Mark Andrews, Werner Swanepoel, André Snyman; Con: Henry Honiball 2, Percy Montgomery; Pen: Henry Honiball	Referee: Colin Hawke (New Zealand)

22 November 1997	France	10–52	South Africa	Parc de Princes, Paris
			Try: Gary Teichmann, Henry Honiball, Pieter Rossouw 4, André Snyman; Con: Henry Honiball 7 Pen: Henry Honiball	Referee: Paddy O'Brien (New Zealand)

15 November 1997	France	32–36	South Africa	Stade de Gerland, Lyon
			Try: James Dalton, Pieter Rossouw, Dick Muir, James Small, Percy Montgomery; Con: Henry Honiball 4 Pen: Henry Honiball	Referee: Derek Bevan (Wales)

8 November 1997	Italy	31–62	South Africa	Stadio Renato Dall'Ara, Bologna
			Try: Os du Randt, Rassie Erasmus, Pieter Rossouw, Dick Muir, James Small 2, Justin Swart; Con: Henry Honiball 7 Pen: Henry Honiball	Referee: Pablo DeLuca ( Argentina)

23 August 1997	South Africa	61–22	Australia	Loftus Versfeld, Pretoria
	Try: James Dalton, Mark Andrews, Warren Brosnihan, Rassie Erasmus, Jannie de Beer, Percy Montgomery 2, Pieter Rossouw; Con: Jannie de Beer 6 Pen: Jannie de Beer 3			Referee: Paddy O'Brien (New Zealand)

9 August 1997	New Zealand	55–35	South Africa	Eden Park, Auckland
			Try: Ruben Kruger, Gary Teichmann, Joost van der Westhuizen, Percy Montgomery, Pieter Rossouw; Con: Jannie de Beer 3, Henry Honiball 2	Referee: (New Zealand)

2 August 1997	Australia	32–20	South Africa	Lang Park, Brisbane
			Try: Os du Randt, Mark Andrews, Jannie de Beer; Con: Jannie de Beer; Pen: Jannie de Beer	Referee: Colin Hawke (New Zealand)

19 July 1997	South Africa	32–35	New Zealand	Ellis Park Stadium, Johannesburg
	Try: Naka Drotské, Russell Bennett; Con: Jannie de Beer 2 Pen: Jannie de Beer 4 Drop: Jannie de Beer 2			Referee: Peter Marshall (Australia)

5 July 1997	South Africa	35–16	British & Irish Lions	Ellis Park Stadium, Johannesburg
	Try: Joost van der Westhuizen, Pieter Rossouw, Percy Montgomery, André Snyman; Con: Jannie de Beer 2, Henry Honiball; Pen: Jannie de Beer 3			Referee: Wayne Erickson (Australia)

28 June 1997	South Africa	15–18	British & Irish Lions	Kings Park Stadium, Durban
	Try: Joost van der Westhuizen, Percy Montgomery, André Joubert			Referee: Didier Mené (France)

21 June 1997	South Africa	16–25	British & Irish Lions	Newlands Stadium, Cape Town
	Try: Os du Randt, Russell Bennett; Pen: Henry Honiball, Edrich Lubbe			Referee: Colin Hawke (New Zealand)

10 June 1997	South Africa	74–10	Tonga	Newlands Stadium, Cape Town
	Try: Naka Drotské, Adrian Garvey 2, Fritz van Heerden, Ruben Kruger 2, Joost van der Westhuizen, André Snyman 3, James Small 2 Con: Edrich Lubbe 7			Referee: Marty Wild (Zimbabwe)

=== 1996 ===
1996 record

Games played	Won	Lost	Drawn	Win percentage
13	8	5	0	62%

15 December 1996	Wales	20–37	South Africa	Cardiff Arms Park, Cardiff
			Try: Joost van der Westhuizen 3, Jacques Olivier, André Joubert; Con: André Joubert, Henry Honiball 2 Pen: Henry Honiball 2	Referee: Steve Lander (England)

7 December 1996	France	12–13	South Africa	Parc de Princes, Paris
			Try: James Dalton; Con: Henry Honiball; Pen: Henry Honiball 2	Referee: Derek Bevan (Wales)

30 November 1996	France	12–22	South Africa	Stade Chaban-Delmas, Bordeaux
			Try: James Small, André Joubert; Pen: Henry Honiball 4	Referee: Brian Stirling (Ireland)

16 November 1998	Argentina	21–44	South Africa	Estadio Arquitecto Ricardo Etcheverry, Buenos Aires
			Try: Ruben Kruger 2, André Venter, Jacques Olivier, Hennie le Roux, Japie Mulder; Con: Henry Honiball 4 Pen: Henry Honiball 2	Referee: Ed Murray (Scotland)

9 November 1996	Argentina	15–46	South Africa	Estadio Arquitecto Ricardo Etcheverry, Buenos Aires
			Try: Mark Andrews, André Venter, Joost van der Westhuizen, Hennie le Roux, James Small, André Joubert; Con: Henry Honiball 3, André Joubert; Pen: Henry Honiball	Referee: Jim Fleming (Scotland)

31 August 1996	South Africa	32–22	New Zealand	Ellis Park Stadium, Johannesburg
	Try: Joost van der Westhuizen 2, André Joubert; Con: Henry Honiball; Pen: Henry Honiball 2, André Joubert 3			Referee: Derek Bevan (Wales)

24 August 1996	South Africa	26–33	New Zealand	Loftus Versfeld, Pretoria
	Try: Hannes Strydom, Ruben Kruger, Joost van der Westhuizen; Con: Joel Stransky; Pen: Joel Stransky 3			Referee: Didier Mené (France)

17 August 1996	South Africa	19–23	New Zealand	Kings Park Stadium, Durban
	Try: Danie van Schalkwyk; Con: Joel Stransky; Pen: Joel Stransky 4			Referee: Patrick Thomas (France)

10 August 1996	South Africa	18–29	New Zealand	Newlands Stadium, Cape Town
	Try: Os du Randt, Japie Mulder; Con: Joel Stransky; Pen: Joel Stransky 2			Referee: Dave McHugh (Ireland)

3 August 1996	South Africa	25–19	Australia	Free State Stadium, Bloemfontein
	Try: Joel Stransky; Con: Joel Stransky; Pen: Joel Stransky 6			Referee: Brian Stirling (Ireland)

20 July 1996	New Zealand	15–11	South Africa	Lancaster Park, Christchurch
			Try: André Joubert; Pen: Joel Stransky 2	Referee: Ray Megson (Scotland)

13 July 1996	Australia	21–16	South Africa	Sydney Football Stadium, Stadium
			Try: Pieter Hendriks; Con: Henry Honiball; Pen: Henry Honiball 2, André Joubert	Referee: Tony Spreadbury (England)

2 July 1996	South Africa	43–18	Fiji	Loftus Versfeld, Pretoria
	Try: Mark Andrews, Japie Mulder, André Joubert, Danie van Schalkwyk; Con: Henry Honiball 2, André Joubert; Pen: Henry Honiball 2, André Joubert 2			Referee: Johan Meuwesen (Namibia)

=== 1995 ===
1995 record

Games played	Won	Lost	Drawn	Win percentage
10	10	0	0	100%

18 November 1995	England	14–24	South Africa	Twickenham, London
			Try: Joost van der Westhuizen, Chester Williams 2 Pen: Joel Stransky 3	Referee: Jim Fleming (Scotland)

12 November 1995	Italy	20–41	South Africa	Olympic Stadium, Rome
			Try: Francois Pienaar, Hennie le Roux, Japie Mulder, PENALTY TRY; Con: Joel Stransky 4 Pen: Joel Stransky 4	Referee: Steve Lander (England)

2 September 1995	Wales	11- 40	South Africa	Ellis Park Stadium, Johannesburg
			Try: Kobus Wiese, Francois Pienaar, Gary Teichmann, Japie Mulder, James Small; Con: Joel Stransky 3 Pen: Joel Stransky 3	Referee: Joel Dume (France)

24 June 1995 *	South Africa	15–12	New Zealand	Ellis Park Stadium, Johannesburg
	Pen: Joel Stransky 3 Drop: Joel Stransky 2			Referee: Ed Morrison (England)

17 June 1995 *	South Africa	19–15	France	Kings Park Stadium, Durban
	Try: Ruben Kruger; Con: Joel Stransky; Pen: Joel Stransky 4			Referee: Derek Bevan (France)

10 June 1995 *	South Africa	42–14	Samoa	Ellis Park Stadium, Johannesburg
	Try: Chris Rossouw, Mark Andrews, Chester Williams 4 Con: Gavin Johnson 3 Pen: Gavin Johnson 2			Referee: Jim Fleming (Scotland)

3 June 1995 *	South Africa	20–0	Canada	EPRFU Stadium, Port Elizabeth
	Try: Adriaan Richter 2 Con: Joel Stransky 2 Pen: Joel Stransky 2			Referee: Dave McHugh (Ireland)

30 May 1995 *	South Africa	21–8	Romania	Newlands Stadium, Cape Town
	Try: Adriaan Richter 2 Con: Gavin Johnson; Pen: Gavin Johnson 3			Referee: Ken McCartney (Scotland)

25 May 1995 *	South Africa	27–18	Australia	Newlands Stadium, Cape Town
	Try: Pieter Hendriks, Joel Stransky; Con: Joel Stransky; Pen: Joel Stransky 4 Drop: Joel Stransky			Referee: Steve Lander (England)

13 April 1995	South Africa	60–8	Samoa	Ellis Park Stadium, Johannesburg
	Try: Chris Rossouw, Mark Andrews, Joel Stransky, Chester Williams 2, James Small, Gavin Johnson 3 Con: Joel Stransky, Gavin Johnson 5 Pen: Gavin Johnson			Referee: Johan Meuwesen (Namibia)

=== 1994 ===
1994 record

Games played	Won	Lost	Drawn	Win percentage
9	5	3	1	56%

26 November 1994	Wales	12–20	South Africa	Cardiff Arms Park, Cardiff
			Try: Rudolph Straeuli, Chester Williams, André Joubert; Con: Hennie le Roux; Pen: Hennie le Roux	Referee: Didier Mene (France)

19 November 1994	Scotland	10–34	South Africa	Murrayfield, Edinburgh
			Try: Rudolph Straeuli, Joost van der Westhuizen 2, Chester Williams, Japie Mulder; Con: André Joubert 3 Pen: André Joubert	Referee: Owen Doyle (Ireland)

15 October 1994	South Africa	46–26	Argentina	Ellis Park Stadium, Johannesburg
	Try: Mark Andrews, Rudolph Straeuli, Joost van der Westhuizen, Joel Stransky, Chester Williams, Chris Badenhorst; Con: Joel Stransky 4 Pen: Joel Stransky			Referee: Glenn Wahlstrom (New Zealand)

8 October 1994	South Africa	42–22	Argentina	EPRFU Stadium, Port Elizabeth
	Try: Tiaan Strauss, Johan Roux, Joel Stransky, Chester Williams; Con: Joel Stransky 4 Pen: Joel Stransky 3			Referee: Glenn Wahlstrom (New Zealand)

6 August 1994	New Zealand	18–18	South Africa	Eden Park, Auckland
			Try: Brendan Venter, Gavin Johnson; Con: Gavin Johnson; Pen: Gavin Johnson 2	Referee: R. Yeman (Wales)

23 July 1994	New Zealand	13–9	South Africa	Athletic Park, Wellington
			Pen: Theo Jansen van Rensburg 3	Referee: Brian Stirling (Ireland)

9 July 1994	New Zealand	22–14	South Africa	Carisbrook, Dunedin
			Try: Rudolph Straeuli; Pen: André Joubert 3	Referee: Brian Stirling (Ireland)

11 June 1994	South Africa	27–9	England	Newlands Stadium, Cape Town
	Try: Hennie le Roux, André Joubert; Con: André Joubert; Pen: Hennie le Roux 3, André Joubert 2			Referee: Colin Hawke (New Zealand)

4 June 1994	South Africa	15–32	England	Loftus Versfeld, Pretoria
	Pen: André Joubert 5			Referee: Colin Hawke (New Zealand)

=== 1993 ===
1993 record

Games played	Won	Lost	Drawn	Win percentage
7	3	3	1	43%

13 November 1993	Argentina	23–52	South Africa	Estadio Arquitecto Ricardo Etcheverry, Buenos Aires
			Try: Tiaan Strauss 2, Joost van der Westhuizen, Chester Williams, James Small, Gavin Johnson; Con: Gavin Johnson 4 Pen: Gavin Johnson 3	Referee: Derek Bevan (Wales)

6 November 1993	Argentina	26–29	South Africa	Estadio Arquitecto Ricardo Etcheverry, Buenos Aires
			Try: Joost van der Westhuizen, James Small 2, André Joubert; Con: Joel Stransky 3 Pen: Joel Stransky	Referee: Derek Bevan (Wales)

21 August 1993	Australia	19–12	South Africa	Sydney Football Stadium, Sydney
			Try: Francois Pienaar, James Small; Con: Joel Stransky	Referee: Ed Morrison (Wales)

14 August 1993	Australia	28–20	South Africa	Ballymore Stadium, Brisbane
			Try: Jacques Olivier, Joel Stransky; Con: Joel Stransky 2 Pen: Joel Stransky 2	Referee: Ed Morrison (England)

31 July 1993	Australia	12–19	South Africa	Sydney Football Stadium, Sydney
			Try: Pieter Muller, James Small; Con: Theo Jansen van Rensburg 2	Referee: Lindsay McLachlan (New Zealand)

3 July 1993	South Africa	17–18	France	Ellis Park Stadium, Johannesburg
	Try: James Small; Pen: Theo Jansen van Rensburg 4			Referee: Ed Morrison (England)

26 June 1993	South Africa	20–20	France	Kings Park Stadium, Durban
	Try: Uli Schmidt; Pen: Theo Jansen van Rensburg 5			Referee: Steve Hilditch (Ireland)

=== 1992 ===
1992 record

Games played	Won	Lost	Drawn	Win percentage
5	1	4	0	20%

14 November 1992	England	33–16	South Africa	Twickenham, London
			Try: Tiaan Strauss, Con: Naas Botha; Pen: Naas Botha 2 Drop: Naas Botha	Referee: Steve Hilditch (Ireland)

24 October 1992	France	29–16	South Africa	Parc des Princes, Paris
			Try: Danie Gerber; Con: Naas Botha; Pen: Naas Botha 2 Drop: Naas Botha	Referee: Brian Kinsey (Australia)

17 October 1992	France	15–20	South Africa	Stade de Gerland, Lyon
			Try: Danie Gerber, James Small; Con: Naas Botha 2 Pen: Naas Botha; Drop: Naas Botha	Referee: Brian Kinsey (Australia)

22 August 1992	South Africa	3–26	Australia	Newlands Stadium, Cape Town
	Pen: Naas Botha			Referee: Dave Bishop (New Zealand)

15 August 1992	South Africa	24–27	New Zealand	Ellis Park Stadium, Johannesburg
	Try: Danie Gerber 2, Pieter Muller; Con: Naas Botha 3 Pen: Naas Botha			Referee: Sandy MacNeill (Australia)

== 1980s ==
1980s record

Games played	Won	Lost	Drawn	Win percentage
27	22	5	0	81.5%

=== 1989 ===
1989 record

Games played	Won	Lost	Drawn	Win percentage
2	2	0	0	100%

2 September 1989	South Africa	22–16	World XV	Ellis Park Stadium, Johannesburg
	Try: Michael du Plessis, Johan Heunis; Con: Naas Botha; Pen: Naas Botha 3 Drop: Naas Botha			Referee: Kerry Fitzgerald (Australia)

26 August 1989	South Africa	20–19	World XV	Newlands Stadium, Cape Town
	Try: Gert Smal, Faffa Knoetze, Naas Botha; Con: Naas Botha; Pen: Naas Botha 2			Referee: Kerry Fitzgerald (Australia)

=== 1986 ===
1986 record

Games played	Won	Lost	Drawn	Win percentage
4	3	1	0	75%

31 May 1986	South Africa	24–10	New Zealand Cavaliers	Ellis Park Stadium, Johannesburg
	Try: Garth Wright; Con: Naas Botha; Pen: Naas Botha 5 Drop: Michael du Plessis			Referee: Ken Rowlands (Wales)

24 May 1986	South Africa	33–18	New Zealand Cavaliers	Loftus Versfeld, Pretoria
	Try: Uli Schmidt, Danie Gerber, Jaco Reinach, Naas Botha; Con: Naas Botha 4 Pen: Naas Botha 3			Referee: Ken Rowlands (Wales)

17 May 1986	South Africa	18–19	New Zealand Cavaliers	Kings Park Stadium, Durban
	Try: Jaco Reinach; Con: Naas Botha; Pen: Naas Botha 4			Referee: Ken Rowlands (Wales)

10 May 1986	South Africa	21–15	New Zealand Cavaliers	Newlands Stadium, Cape Town
	Try: Carel du Plessis; Con: Naas Botha; Pen: Naas Botha 3 Drop: Naas Botha 2			Referee: Ken Rowlands (Wales)

=== 1984 ===
1984 record

Games played	Won	Lost	Drawn	Win percentage
4	4	0	0	100%

27 October 1984	South Africa	22–13	Sudamérica XV	Newlands Stadium, Cape Town
	Try: Kulu Ferreira, Carel du Plessis, Danie Gerber, Ray Mordt; Pen: Errol Tobias 2			Referee: René Hourquet (France)

20 October 1984	South Africa	32–15	Sudamérica XV	Loftus Versfeld, Pretoria
	Try: Rob Louw, Nick Mallett, Divan Serfontein, Danie Gerber, Johan Heunis; Con: Errol Tobias 2, Danie Gerber; Pen: Errol Tobias 2			Referee: René Hourquet (France)

9 June 1984	South Africa	35–9	England	Ellis Park Stadium, Johannesburg
	Try: Theuns Stofberg, Gerrie Sonnekus, Errol Tobias, Danie Gerber 3 Con: Errol Tobias, Johan Heunis 3 Pen: Johan Heunis			Referee: René Hourquet (France)

2 June 1984	South Africa	33–15	England	Boet Erasmus Stadium, Port Elizabeth
	Try: Rob Louw, Carel du Plessis, Danie Gerber; Con: Johan Heunis 3 Pen: Johan Heunis 5			Referee: René Hourquet (France)

=== 1982 ===
1982 record

Games played	Won	Lost	Drawn	Win percentage
2	1	1	0	50%

3 April 1982	South Africa	12–21	Sudamérica XV	Free State Stadium, Bloemfontein
	Try: Danie Gerber; Con: Naas Botha; Pen: Naas Botha			Referee: Fransie Muller (South Africa)

27 March 1982	South Africa	50–18	Sudamérica XV	Loftus Versfeld, Pretoria
	Try: Ockie Oosthuizen, Carel du Plessis, Willie du Plessis, Danie Gerber 3, Ray Mordt 2 Con: Naas Botha 6 Pen: Johan Heunis; Drop: Naas Botha			Referee: Steve Strydom (South Africa)

=== 1981 ===
1981 record

Games played	Won	Lost	Drawn	Win percentage
6	4	2	0	67%

20 September 1981	United States	7–38	South Africa	Owl Creek Polo ground, Glenville, NY
			Try: Burger Geldenhuys, Gerrie Germishuys, Colin Beck, Ray Mordt 3, Thys Burger; Con: Naas Botha 3	Referee: D. Morrison (United States)

12 September 1981	New Zealand	25–22	South Africa	Eden Park, Auckland
			Try: Ray Mordt 3 Con: Naas Botha 2 Pen: Naas Botha 2	Referee: Clive Norling (Wales)

29 August 1981	New Zealand	12–24	South Africa	Athletic Park, Wellington
			Try: Gerrie Germishuys; Con: Naas Botha; Pen: Naas Botha 5 Drop: Naas Botha	Referee: Clive Norling (Wales)

15 August 1981	New Zealand	14–9	South Africa	Lancaster Park, Christchurch
			Try: Hennie Bekker; Con: Naas Botha; Drop: Naas Botha	Referee: LM Prideaux (France)

6 June 1981	South Africa	12–10	Ireland	Kings Park Stadium, Durban
	Pen: Naas Botha; Drop: Naas Botha 3			Referee: Françis Palmade (France)

30 May 1981	South Africa	23–15	Ireland	Newlands Stadium, Cape Town
	Try: Rob Louw, Danie Gerber 2 Con: Naas Botha; Pen: Naas Botha 3			Referee: Françis Palmade (France)

=== 1980 ===
1980 record

Games played	Won	Lost	Drawn	Win percentage
9	8	1	0	89%

8 November 1980	South Africa	37–15	France	Loftus Versfeld, Pretoria
	Try: Willie Kahts, Theuns Stofberg, Divan Serfontein, Gerrie Germishuys, Gysie Pienaar; Con: Naas Botha 4 Pen: Naas Botha 3			Referee: John West (Ireland)

25 October 1980	Sudamérica XV	16–30	South Africa	Prince of Wales Country Club, Santiago
			Try: Morné du Plessis, Gerrie Germishuys 2, Danie Gerber, Ray Mordt 2 Con: Naas Botha 3	Referee: LM Prideaux (France)

18 October 1980	Sudamérica XV	13–22	South Africa	Wanderers Club, Montevideo
			Try: Theuns Stofberg, Thys Burger, Danie Gerber; Con: Naas Botha 2 Pen: Naas Botha; Drop: Naas Botha	Referee: LM Prideaux (France)

12 July 1980	South Africa	13–17	British & Irish Lions	Loftus Versfeld, Pretoria
	Try: Willie du Plessis; Pen: Gysie Pienaar 2, Naas Botha			Referee: Jean-Pierre Bonnet (France)

28 June 1980	South Africa	12–10	British & Irish Lions	Boet Erasmus, Port Elizabeth
	Try: Gerrie Germishuys; Con: Naas Botha; Pen: Naas Botha; Drop: Naas Botha			Referee: Jean-Pierre Bonnet (France)

14 June 1980	South Africa	26–19	British & Irish Lions	Free State Stadium, Bloemfontein
	Try: Rob Louw, Theuns Stofberg, Gerrie Germishuys, Gysie Pienaar; Con: Naas Botha 2 Pen: Naas Botha 2			Referee: Françis Palmade (France)

31 May 1980	South Africa	26–22	British & Irish Lions	Newlands Stadium, Cape Town
	Try: Moaner van Heerden, Rob Louw, Divan Serfontein, Gerrie Germishuys, Willie du Plessis; Con: Naas Botha 3			Referee: Françis Palmade (France)

3 May 1980	South Africa	18–9	Sudamérica XV	Kings Park Stadium, Durban
	Try: Morné du Plessis; Con: Naas Botha; Pen: Naas Botha; Drop: Naas Botha 3			Referee: Ken Rowlands (Wales)

26 April 1980	South Africa	24–9	Sudamérica XV	Wanderers, Johannesburg
	Try: Tommy du Plessis, Gerrie Germishuys, Ray Mordt; Con: Naas Botha 3 Pen: Naas Botha; Drop: Naas Botha			Referee: Ken Rowlands (Wales)

== 1970s ==
1970s record

Games played	Won	Lost	Drawn	Win percentage
25	15	6	4	60%

=== 1977 ===
1977 record

Games played	Won	Lost	Drawn	Win percentage
1	1	0	0	100%

27 August 1977	South Africa	45–24	World XV	Loftus Versfeld, Pretoria
	Try: Theuns Stofberg 2, Barry Wolmarans, Gerrie Germishuys, Hermanus Potgieter, Dawie Snyman; Con: Robbie Blair 3 Pen: Robbie Blair 5			Referee: Johan Gouws (South Africa)

=== 1976 ===
1976 record

Games played	Won	Lost	Drawn	Win percentage
4	3	1	0	75%

18 September 1976	South Africa	15–14	New Zealand	Ellis Park Stadium, Johannesburg
	Try: Klippies Kritzinger; Con: Gerald Bosch; Pen: Gerald Bosch 2 Drop: Gerald Bosch			Referee: Gert Bezuidenhout (South Africa)

4 September 1976	South Africa	15–10	New Zealand	Newlands Stadium, Cape Town
	Try: Johan Oosthuizen; Con: Gerald Bosch; Pen: Gerald Bosch 2 Drop: Dawie Snyman			Referee: Gert Bezuidenhout (South Africa)

14 August 1976	South Africa	9–15	New Zealand	Free State Stadium, Bloemfontein
	Pen: Gerald Bosch			Referee: Gert Bezuidenhout (South Africa)

24 July 1976	South Africa	16–7	New Zealand	Kings Park Stadium, Durban
	Try: Gerrie Germishuys; Con: Gerald Bosch; Pen: Gerald Bosch; Drop: Ian Robertson			Referee: Ian Gourlay (South Africa)

=== 1975 ===
1975 record

Games played	Won	Lost	Drawn	Win percentage
2	2	0	0	100%

28 June 1975	South Africa	33–18	France	Loftus Versfeld, Pretoria
	Try: Morné du Plessis, Carel Fourie; Con: Gerald Bosch 2 Pen: Gerald Bosch 6, Carel Fourie			Referee: Norman Sanson (Scotland)

21 June 1975	South Africa	38–25	France	Free State Stadium, Bloemfontein
	Try: Robert Cockrell, Kleintjie Grobler, Peter Whipp, Johan Oosthuizen, Chris Pope; Con: Gerald Bosch 2, Dawie Snyman; Pen: Gerald Bosch 3, Dawie Snyman			Referee: Norman Sanson (Scotland)

=== 1974 ===
1974 record

Games played	Won	Lost	Drawn	Win percentage
6	2	3	1	33%

30 November 1974	France	8–10	South Africa	Parc des Princes, Paris
			Try: Willem Stapelberg; Pen: Gerald Bosch 2	Referee: Johnny Johnson (England)

23 November 1974	France	4–13	South Africa	Stadium Municipal, Toulouse
			Try: Willem Stapelberg; Pen: Gerald Bosch 2, Carel Fourie	Referee: Norman Sanson (Scotland)

27 July 1974	South Africa	13–13	British & Irish Lions	Ellis Park Stadium, Johannesburg
	Try: Peter Cronjé; Pen: Jackie Snyman 3			Referee: Max Baise (South Africa)

13 July 1974	South Africa	9–26	British & Irish Lions	Boet Erasmus, Port Elizabeth
	Pen: Jackie Snyman 3			Referee: Cas de Bruyn (South Africa)

22 June 1974	South Africa	9–28	British & Irish Lions	Loftus Versfeld, Pretoria
	Pen: Gerald Bosch 2 Drop: Gerald Bosch			Referee: Cas de Bruyn (South Africa)

8 June 1974	South Africa	3–12	British & Irish Lions	Newlands Stadium, Cape Town
	Drop: Dawie Snyman			Referee: Max Baise (South Africa)

=== 1972 ===
1972 record

Games played	Won	Lost	Drawn	Win percentage
1	0	1	0	0%

3 June 1972	South Africa	9–18	England	Ellis Park Stadium, Johannesburg
	Pen: Dawie Snyman 3			Referee: Justus Moolman (South Africa)

=== 1971 ===
1971 record

Games played	Won	Lost	Drawn	Win percentage
5	4	0	1	80%

7 August 1971	Australia	6–18	South Africa	Sydney Cricket Ground, Sydney
			Try: Jan Ellis, Peter Cronjé, Piet Visagie; Con: Piet Visagie 3 Pen: Piet Visagie	Referee: Roger Vanderfield (Australia)

31 July 1971	Australia	6–14	South Africa	Brisbane Exhibition Ground, Brisbane
			Try: Piet Visagie 2, Hannes Viljoen; Con: Ian McCallum; Pen: Ian McCallum	Referee: Craig Ferguson (Australia)

17 July 1971	Australia	11–19	South Africa	Sydney Cricket Ground, Sydney
			Try: Jan Ellis, Joggie Viljoen, Hannes Viljoen; Con: Ian McCallum 2 Pen: Ian McCallum; Drop: Piet Visagie	Referee: Craig Ferguson (Australia)

19 June 1971	South Africa	8–8	France	Kings Park Stadium, Durban
	Try: Peter Cronjé; Con: Ian McCallum; Drop: Piet Visagie			Referee: Wynand Malan (South Africa)

12 June 1971	South Africa	22–9	France	Free State Stadium, Bloemfontein
	Try: Joggie Viljoen, Gert Muller, Con: Ian McCallum 2 Pen: Ian McCallum 3 Drop: Piet Visagie			Referee: Wynand Malan (South Africa)

=== 1970 ===
1970 record

Games played	Won	Lost	Drawn	Win percentage
6	3	1	2	50%

12 September 1970	South Africa	20–17	New Zealand	Ellis Park Stadium, Johannesburg
	Try: Piet Visagie, Gert Muller; Con: Ian McCallum; Pen: Ian McCallum 4			Referee: Bert Woolley (South Africa)

29 August 1970	South Africa	14–3	New Zealand	Boet Erasmus, Port Elizabeth
	Try: Gert Muller 2 Con: Ian McCallum; Pen: Ian McCallum 2			Referee: Piet Robbertse (South Africa)

8 August 1970	South Africa	8–9	New Zealand	Newlands Stadium, Cape Town
	Try: Joggie Jansen; Con: Ian McCallum; Pen: Ian McCallum			Referee: Wynand Malan (South Africa)

25 July 1970	South Africa	17–6	New Zealand	Loftus Versfeld, Pretoria
	Try: Dawie de Villiers, Syd Nomis; Con: Ian McCallum; Pen: Ian McCallum 2 Drop: Piet Visagie			Referee: Piet Robbertse (South Africa)

24 January 1970	Wales	6–6	South Africa	Cardiff Arms Park, Cardiff
			Try: Syd Nomis; Pen: HO de Villiers	Referee: Larry Lamb (England)

10 January 1970	Ireland	8–8	South Africa	Lansdowne Road, Dublin
			Try: Piet Greyling; Con: HO de Villiers; Pen: HO de Villiers	Referee: TFE Grierson (Scotland)

== 1960s ==
1960s record

Games played	Won	Lost	Drawn	Win percentage
47	28	14	5	59.6%

=== 1969 ===
1969 record

Games played	Won	Lost	Drawn	Win percentage
6	4	2	0	67%

20 December 1969	England	11–8	South Africa	Twickenham, London
			Try: Piet Greyling; Con: Piet Visagie; Pen: Piet Visagie	Referee: Kevin Kelleher (Ireland)

6 December 1969	Scotland	6–3	South Africa	Murrayfield, Edinburgh
			Pen: Piet Visagie	Referee: Kevin Kelleher (Wales)

20 September 1969	South Africa	19–8	Australia	Free State Stadium, Bloemfontein
	Try: Eben Olivier 2, Mannetjies Roux; Con: Piet Visagie 2 Pen: Piet Visagie 2			Referee: Cas de Bruyn (South Africa)

6 September 1969	South Africa	11–3	Australia	Newlands Stadium, Cape Town
	Try: Jan Ellis, Piet Visagie; Con: Piet Visagie; Pen: Piet Visagie			Referee: Solly Baise (South Africa)

16 August 1969	South Africa	16–9	Australia	Kings Park Stadium, Durban
	Try: Jannie Engelbrecht 2, Piet Visagie; Con: Piet Visagie 2 Pen: Piet Visagie			Referee: Max Baise (South Africa)

2 August 1969	South Africa	30–11	Australia	Ellis Park Stadium, Johannesburg
	Try: Piet Greyling, Jan Ellis, Syd Nomis 2, Mannetjies Roux; Con: Piet Visagie 3 Pen: Piet Visagie 3			Referee: Piet Robbertse (South Africa)

=== 1968 ===
1968 record

Games played	Won	Lost	Drawn	Win percentage
6	5	0	1	83%

16 November 1968	France	11–16	South Africa	Stade Olympique, Paris
			Try: Dawie de Villiers, Syd Nomis, Jannie Engelbrecht; Con: Piet Visagie 2 Pen: Piet Visagie	Referee: Paddy D'Arcy (Ireland)

9 November 1969	France	9–12	South Africa	Stade Municipal, Bordeaux
			Pen: Piet Visagie 4	Referee: Larry Lamb (England)

27 July 1968	South Africa	19–6	British & Irish Lions	Ellis Park Stadium, Johannesburg
	Try: Jan Ellis, Syd Nomis, Eben Olivier, Mannetjies Roux; Con: Piet Visagie 2 Drop: Rodney Gould			Referee: Dr. Bertie Strasheim (South Africa)

13 July 1968	South Africa	11–6	British & Irish Lions	Newlands Stadium, Cape Town
	Try: Thys Lourens; Con: Piet Visagie; Pen: Piet Visagie, Tiny Naudé			Referee: Max Baise (South Africa)

22 June 1968	South Africa	6–6	British & Irish Lions	Boet Erasmus, Port Elizabeth
	Pen: Piet Visagie, Tiny Naudé			Referee: Johan Schoeman (South Africa)

8 June 1968	South Africa	25–20	British & Irish Lions	Loftus Versfeld, Pretoria
	Try: Frik du Preez, Tiny Naudé, Dawie de Villiers; Con: Piet Visagie 2 Pen: Piet Visagie 2, Tiny Naudé			Referee: Max Baise (South Africa)

=== 1967 ===
1967 record

Games played	Won	Lost	Drawn	Win percentage
4	2	1	1	50%

12 August 1967	South Africa	6–6	France	Newlands Stadium, Cape Town
	Pen: HO de Villiers; Drop: Piet Visagie			Referee: Piet Robbertse (South Africa)

29 July 1967	South Africa	14–19	France	Ellis Park Stadium, Johannesburg
	Try: Jan Ellis, Eben Olivier; Con: Piet Visagie; Pen: Tiny Naudé 2			Referee: Max Baise (South Africa)

22 July 1967	South Africa	16–3	France	Free State Stadium, Bloemfontein
	Try: Corra Dirksen, Eben Olivier, Jannie Engelbrecht; Con: HO de Villiers 2 Pen: Tiny Naudé			Referee: Max Baise (South Africa)

15 July 1967	South Africa	26–3	France	Kings Park Stadium, Durban
	Try: Piet Greyling 2, Jan Ellis, Corra Dirksen 2 Con: HO de Villiers 4 Pen: HO de Villiers			Referee: Dr. Bertie Strasheim (South Africa)

=== 1965 ===
1965 record

Games played	Won	Lost	Drawn	Win percentage
8	1	7	0	13%

18 September 1965	New Zealand	20–3	South Africa	Eden Park, Auckland
			Pen: Tiny Naudé	Referee: David Millar (New Zealand)

4 September 1965	New Zealand	16–19	South Africa	Lancaster Park, Christchurch
			Try: Gertjie Brynard 2, John Gainsford 2 Con: Tiny Naudé 2 Pen: Tiny Naudé	Referee: Pat Murphy (New Zealand)

21 August 1965	New Zealand	13–0	South Africa	Carisbrook, Dunedin
				Referee: Pat Murphy (New Zealand)

31 July 1965	New Zealand	6–3	South Africa	Athletic Park, Wellington
			Drop: Keith Oxlee	Referee: Pat Murphy (New Zealand)

26 June 1965	Australia	12–8	South Africa	Lang Park, Brisbane
			Try: John Gainsford, Trix Truter; Con: Tiny Naudé	Referee: Kevin Crowe (Australia)

19 June 1965	Australia	18–11	South Africa	Sydney Cricket Ground, Sydney
			Try: Jannie Engelbrecht 2 Con: Tiny Naudé; Pen: Tiny Naudé	Referee: Craig Ferguson (Australia)

17 April 1965	Scotland	8–5	South Africa	Murrayfield, Edinburgh
			Try: Jannie Engelbrecht; Con: Wynand Mans	Referee: Gwynne Walters (Wales)

10 April 1965	Ireland	9–6	South Africa	Lansdowne Road, Dublin
			Try: Wynand Mans; Pen: Dave Stewart	Referee: PG Brook (England)

=== 1964 ===
1964 record

Games played	Won	Lost	Drawn	Win percentage
2	1	1	0	50%

25 July 1964	South Africa	6–8	France	PAM Brink Stadium, Springs
	Try: Dave Stewart; Pen: Dave Stewart			Referee: Dr. Bertie Strasheim (South Africa)

23 May 1964	South Africa	24–3	Wales	Kings Park Stadium, Durban
	Try: Hannes Marais, Doug Hopwood, Nelie Smith; Con: Keith Oxlee 3 Pen: Keith Oxlee 2 Drop: Lionel Wilson			Referee: Dr Gert Engelbrecht (South Africa)

=== 1963 ===
1963 record

Games played	Won	Lost	Drawn	Win percentage
4	2	2	0	50%

7 September 1963	South Africa	22–6	Australia	Boet Erasmus, Port Elizabeth
	Try: Abie Malan, John Gainsford, Tiny Naudé; Con: Keith Oxlee 2 Pen: Tiny Naudé, Keith Oxlee 2			Referee: Toy Myburgh (South Africa)

24 August 1963	South Africa	9–11	Australia	Ellis Park Stadium, Johannesburg
	Pen: Nelie Smith 3			Referee: Toy Myburgh (South Africa)

10 August 1963	South Africa	5–9	Australia	Newlands Stadium, Cape Town
	Try: PENALTY TRY; Con: Keith Oxlee			Referee: Toy Myburgh (South Africa)

13 July 1963	South Africa	14–3	Australia	Loftus Versfeld, Pretoria
	Try: Tommy Bedford, Gert Cilliers; Con: Keith Oxlee; Pen: Keith Oxlee 2			Referee: Eddie Hofmeyr (South Africa)

=== 1962 ===
1962 record

Games played	Won	Lost	Drawn	Win percentage
4	3	0	1	75%

25 August 1962	South Africa	34–14	British & Irish Lions	Free State Stadium, Bloemfontein
	Try: Johan Claassen, Hugo van Zyl, Mannetjies Roux 2, Wang Wyness, John Gainsford; Con: Keith Oxlee 5 Pen: Keith Oxlee 2			Referee: Toy Myburgh (South Africa)

4 August 1962	South Africa	8–3	British & Irish Lions	Newlands Stadium, Cape Town
	Try: Keith Oxlee; Con: Keith Oxlee; Pen: Keith Oxlee			Referee: Dr. Bertie Strasheim (South Africa)

21 July 1962	South Africa	3–0	British & Irish Lions	Kings Park Stadium, Durban
	Pen: Keith Oxlee			Referee: Ken Carlson (South Africa)

23 June 1962	South Africa	3–3	British & Irish Lions	Ellis Park Stadium, Johannesburg
	Try: John Gainsford			Referee: Dr. Bertie Strasheim (South Africa)

=== 1961 ===
1961 record

Games played	Won	Lost	Drawn	Win percentage
6	5	0	1	83%

12 August 1961	South Africa	23–11	France	Boet Erasmus, Port Elizabeth
	Try: Hennie van Zyl, Mannetjies Roux, Keith Oxlee; Con: Keith Oxlee; Pen: Keith Oxlee 3 Drop: Lionel Wilson			Referee: Eddie Hofmeyr (South Africa)

5 August 1961	South Africa	28–3	Australia	Ellis Park Stadium, Johannesburg
	Try: Martin Pelser, Doug Hopwood, Keith Oxlee, Hennie van Zyl 3, John Gainsford, Jannie Engelbrecht; Con: Johan Claassen 2			Referee: RW Burmeister (South Africa)

13 May 1961	South Africa	24–8	Ireland	Newlands Stadium, Cape Town
	Try: Doug Hopwood, Colin Greenwood 2, Ben-Piet van Zyl 2 Con: Charlie Nimb 3 Pen: Charlie Nimb			Referee: Piet Calitz (South Africa)

18 February 1961	France	0–0	South Africa	Stade Olympique, Colombes, Paris
				Referee: Gwynne Walters (Wales)

21 January 1961	Scotland	5–12	South Africa	Murrayfield, Edinburgh
	Try: Johan Claassen, Doug Hopwood; Pen: Frik du Preez 2			Referee: LM Boundy (England)

7 January 1961	England	0–5	South Africa	Twickenham, London
	Try: Doug Hopwood; Con: Frik du Preez			Referee: GJ Treharne

=== 1960 ===
1960 record

Games played	Won	Lost	Drawn	Win percentage
7	5	1	1	83%

17 December 1960	Ireland	3–8	South Africa	Lansdowne Road, Dublin
			Try: Hugo van Zyl, John Gainsford; Con: Dick Lockyear	Referee: GJ Treharne

3 December 1960	Wales	0–3	South Africa	Cardiff Arms Park, Cardiff
	Pen: Keith Oxlee			Referee: Jack Taylor (Scotland)

27 August 1960	South Africa	8–3	New Zealand	Boet Erasmus, Port Elizabeth
	Try: Martin Pelser; Con: Dick Lockyear; Pen: Dick Lockyear			Referee: Ralph Burmeister (South Africa)

13 August 1960	South Africa	11–11	New Zealand	Free State Stadium, Bloemfontein
	Try: Keith Oxlee; Con: Dick Lockyear; Pen: Dick Lockyear 2			Referee: Ralph Burmeister (South Africa)

23 July 1960	South Africa	3–11	New Zealand	Newlands Stadium, Cape Town
	Pen: Keith Oxlee			Referee: Mike Slabber (South Africa)

25 June 1960	South Africa	13–0	New Zealand	Ellis Park Stadium, Johannesburg
	Try: Hennie van Zyl 2 Con: Dick Lockyear, Roy Dryburgh; Pen: Dick Lockyear			Referee: Dr. Bertie Strasheim (South Africa)

30 April 1960	South Africa	18–10	Scotland	Boet Erasmus, Port Elizabeth
	Try: Hugo van Zyl 2, Des van Jaarsveldt, Mannetjies Gericke; Con: Mickey Gerber 3			Referee: Dr. Bertie Strasheim (South Africa)

== 1950s ==
1950s record

Games played	Won	Lost	Drawn	Win percentage
21	13	7	1	61.9%

=== 1958 ===
1958 record

Games played	Won	Lost	Drawn	Win percentage
2	0	1	1	0%

16 August 1958	South Africa	5–9	France	Ellis Park Stadium, Johannesburg
	Try: Lofty Fourie; Con: Mickey Gerber			Referee: Chris Ackermann (South Africa)

26 July 1958	South Africa	3–3	France	Newlands Stadium, Cape Town
	Try: Butch Lochner			Referee: Dr. Bertie Strasheim (South Africa)

=== 1956 ===
1956 record.,

Games played	Won	Lost	Drawn	Win percentage
6	3	3	0	50%

1 September 1956	New Zealand	11–5	South Africa	Eden Park, Auckland
	Try: Peter Jones; Con: Don Clarke; Pen: Don Clarke 2		Try: Roy Dryburgh; Con: Basie Vivier	Referee: Bill Fright (New Zealand)

18 August 1956	New Zealand	17–10	South Africa	Lancaster Park, Christchurch
	Try: Maurice Dixon, Ron Jarden, Richard White; Con: Don Clarke; Pen: Don Clarke 2		Try: Butch Lochner, Wilf Rosenberg; Con: Basie Vivier 2	Referee: Bill Fright (New Zealand)

4 August 1956	New Zealand	3–8	South Africa	Athletic Park, Wellington
	Try: Ross Brown		Try: Salty du Rand, Daan Retief; Con: Basie Vivier	Referee: Francis Parkinson (New Zealand)

14 July 1956	New Zealand	10–6	South Africa	Carisbrook, Dunedin
	Try: Richard White. Ron Jarden; Con: Ron Jarden 2		Try: Peewee Howe; Pen: Roy Dryburgh	Referee: Francis Parkinson (New Zealand)

2 June 1956	Australia	0–9	South Africa	Brisbane Exhibition Ground, Brisbane
			Try: Daan Retief, Roy Dryburgh; Pen: Tom van Vollenhoven	Referee: Tom Moore (Australia)

26 May 1956	Australia	0–9	South Africa	Sydney Cricket Ground, Sydney
			Try: Daan Retief, Jeremy Nel; Pen: Basie Vivier	Referee: Roger Vanderfield (South Africa)

=== 1955 ===
1955 record,

Games played	Won	Lost	Drawn	Win percentage
4	2	2	0	50%

24 September 1955	South Africa	22–8	British & Irish Lions	Crusaders (St George's Park), Port Elizabeth
	Try: Daan Retief, Tom van Vollenhoven, Theuns Briers 2, Clive Ulyate; Con: Roy Dryburgh 2 Drop: Clive Ulyate		Try: Tony O'Reilly	Referee: Chris Ackermann (South Africa)

3 September 1955	South Africa	6–9	British & Irish Lions	Loftus Versfeld, Pretoria
	Pen: Roy Dryburgh 2		Try: Jeff Butterfield; Pen: Doug Baker; Drop: Jeff Butterfield	Referee: Ralph Burmeister (South Africa)

20 August 1955	South Africa	25–9	British & Irish Lions	Newlands Stadium, Cape Town
	Try: Dawie Ackermann, Tom van Vollenhoven 3, Wilf Rosenberg, Theuns Briers, Roy Dryburgh; Con: Roy Dryburgh 2		Try: Jeff Butterfield, Bryn Meredith; Pen: Angus Cameron	Referee: Mike Slabber (South Africa)

6 August 1955	South Africa	22–23	British & Irish Lions	Ellis Park Stadium, Johannesburg
	Try: Chris Koch, Sias Swart, Theuns Briers 2 Con: Jack van der Schyff 2 Pen: Jack van der Schyff 2		Try: Cecil Pedlow, Jeff Butterfield, Cliff Morgan, Jim Greenwood, Tony O'Reilly; Con: Angus Cameron 4	Referee: Ralph Burmeister (South Africa)

=== 1953 ===
1953 record

Games played	Won	Lost	Drawn	Win percentage
4	3	1	0	75%

26 September 1953	South Africa	22–9	Australia	Crusaders (St George's Park), Port Elizabeth
	Try: Chris Koch, Hansie Oelofse; Con: Natie Rens 2 Pen: Natie Rens 2 Drop: Natie Rens, Johnny Buchler			Referee: Lammie Louw (South Africa)

19 September 1953	South Africa	18–8	Australia	Kingsmead, Durban
	Try: Jaap Bekker, Basie van Wyk, Daantjie Rossouw, Dolf Bekker; Con: Natie Rens 3			Referee: Chris Ackermann (South Africa)

5 September 1953	South Africa	14–18	Australia	Newlands Stadium, Cape Town
	Try: Chris Koch, Salty du Rand, Basie van Wyk, Chum Ochse; Con: Buks Marais			Referee: Chris Ackermann (South Africa)

22 August 1953	South Africa	25–3	Australia	Ellis Park Stadium, Johannesburg
	Try: Salty du Rand, Hennie Muller, Hansie Oelofse, Tjol Lategan, Buks Marais; Con: Buks Marais, Johnny Buchler; Pen: Buks Marais, Johnny Buchler			Referee: Ralph Burmeister (South Africa)

=== 1952 ===
1952 record

Games played	Won	Lost	Drawn	Win percentage
2	2	0	0	100%

16 February 1952	France	3–25	South Africa	Stade Olympique, Colombes, Paris
			Try: Willem Delport, Ernst Dinkelmann, Basie van Wyk, Hennie Muller, Paul Johnstone 2 Con: Hennie Muller, Paul Johnstone; Pen: Paul Johnstone	Referee: Capt. Michael Dowling (Ireland)

5 January 1952	England	3–8	South Africa	Twickenham, London
			Try: Fonnie du Toit; Con: Hennie Muller; Pen: Hennie Muller	Referee: William Murdoch (Scotland)

=== 1951 ===
1951 record

Games played	Won	Lost	Drawn	Win percentage
3	3	0	0	100%

22 December 1951	Wales	3–6	South Africa	Cardiff Arms Park, Cardiff
			Try: Chum Ochse; Pen: Hansie Brewis	Referee: Ham Lambert (Ireland)

8 December 1951	Ireland	5–17	South Africa	Lansdowne Road, Dublin
			Try: Basie van Wyk, Chum Ochse, Ryk van Schoor; Con: Okey Geffin; Drop: Hansie Brewis	Referee: William Murdoch (Scotland)

24 November 1951	Scotland	0–44	South Africa	Murrayfield, Edinburgh
			Try: Chris Koch 2, Willem Delport, Salty du Rand, Ernst Dinkelmann, Basie van Wyk, Hennie Muller, Tjol Lategan, Ryk van Schoor; Con: Okey Geffin 7 Drop: Hansie Brewis	Referee: Capt. Michael Dowling (Ireland)

== 1940s ==
1940s record

Games played	Won	Lost	Drawn	Win percentage
4	4	0	0	100%

=== 1949 ===
1949 record

Games played	Won	Lost	Drawn	Win percentage
4	4	0	0	100%

17 September 1949	South Africa	11–8	New Zealand	Crusaders (St George's Park), Port Elizabeth
	Try: Fonnie du Toit; Con: Okey Geffin; Pen: Okey Geffin; Drop: Hansie Brewis			Referee: Ralph Burmeister (South Africa)

3 September 1949	South Africa	9–3	New Zealand	Kingsmead, Durban
	Pen: Okey Geffin 3			Referee: Eddie Hofmeyr (South Africa)

13 August 1949	South Africa	12–6	New Zealand	Ellis Park Stadium, Johannesburg
	Try: Tjol Lategan, Hansie Brewis; Pen: Okey Geffin; Drop: Hansie Brewis			Referee: Ralph Burmeister (South Africa)

16 July 1949	South Africa	15–11	New Zealand	Newlands Stadium, Cape Town
	Pen: Okey Geffin 5			Referee: Eddie Hofmeyr (South Africa)

== 1930s ==
1930s record

Games played	Won	Lost	Drawn	Win percentage
17	13	4	0	76.5%

=== 1938 ===
1938 record

Games played	Won	Lost	Drawn	Win percentage
3	2	1	0	66%

10 September 1938	South Africa	16–21	British Lions	Newlands Stadium, Cape Town
	Try: Jan Lotz, Johnny Bester, Freddy Turner; Con: Freddy Turner 2 Pen: Freddy Turner			Referee: Nic Pretorius (South Africa)

3 September 1938	South Africa	19–3	British Lions	Crusaders (St George's Park), Port Elizabeth
	Try: Ben du Toit, Johnny Bester, Flappie Lochner; Con: Freddy Turner 2 Pen: Freddy Turner 2			Referee: Johnny Strasheim (South Africa)

6 August 1938	South Africa	26–12	British Lions	Ellis Park Stadium, Johannesburg
	Try: Fanie Louw, Tony Harris, Dai Williams 2 Con: Gerry Brand 4 Pen: Gerry Brand 2			Referee: At Horak (South Africa)

=== 1937 ===
1937 record

Games played	Won	Lost	Drawn	Win percentage
5	4	1	0	80%

25 September 1937	New Zealand	6–17	South Africa	Eden Park, Auckland
			Try: Ferdie Bergh, Freddy Turner, Louis Babrow 2, Dai Williams; Con: Gerry Brand	Referee: Joseph King (New Zealand)

4 September 1937	New Zealand	6–13	South Africa	Lancaster Park, Christchurch
			Try: Ebbo Bastard, Freddy Turner; Con: Gerry Brand 2 Pen: Gerry Brand	Referee: Joseph King (New Zealand)

14 August 1937	New Zealand	13–7	South Africa	Athletic Park, Wellington
			Try: Dai Williams; Drop: Jimmy White	Referee: Lyndon Macassey (New Zealand)

17 July 1937	Australia	17–26	South Africa	Sydney Cricket Ground, Sydney
			Try: Ferdie Bergh, George van Reenen 2, Louis Babrow, Jimmy White, Dai Williams; Con: Gerry Brand 4	Referee: WFB Kilner (Australia)

26 June 1937	Australia	5–9	South Africa	Sydney Cricket Ground, Sydney
			Try: Ferdie Bergh, Ebbo Bastard; Pen: Gerry Brand	Referee: Arthur Irving (Australia)

=== 1933 ===
1933 record

Games played	Won	Lost	Drawn	Win percentage
5	3	2	0	60%

2 September 1933	South Africa	4–15	Australia	Springbokpark, Bloemfontein
	Drop: Gerry Brand			Referee: Adv. Boet Neser (South Africa)

26 August 1933	South Africa	11–0	Australia	Crusaders (St George's Park), Port Elizabeth
	Try: Fanie Louw, Jimmy White; Con: Bennie Osler; Pen: Gerry Brand			Referee: Alex van der Horst (South Africa)

12 August 1933	South Africa	12–3	Australia	Ellis Park Stadium, Johannesburg
	Try: Boy Louw, Freddy Turner; Con: Gerry Brand; Drop: Bennie Osler			Referee: Adv. Boet Neser (South Africa)

22 July 1933	South Africa	6–21	Australia	Kingsmead, Durban
	Try: Frankie Waring; Pen: Gerry Brand			Referee: Adv. Boet Neser (South Africa)

8 July 1933	South Africa	17–3	Australia	Newlands Stadium, Cape Town
	Try: Ferdie Bergh 2, Danie Craven, Bennie Osler; Con: Gerry Brand; Pen: Gerry Brand			Referee: Adv. Boet Neser (South Africa)

=== 1932 ===
1932 record

Games played	Won	Lost	Drawn	Win percentage
2	2	0	0	100%

16 January 1932	Scotland	3- 6	South Africa	Murrayfield, Edinburgh
			Try: Danie Craven, Bennie Osler	Referee: Barry Cumberlege (England)

2 January 1932	England	0–7	South Africa	Twickenham, London
			Try: Ferdie Bergh; Drop: Gerry Brand	Referee: WL Freeman (Ireland)

=== 1931 ===
1931 record

Games played	Won	Lost	Drawn	Win percentage
2	2	0	0	100%

19 December 1931	Ireland	3–6	South Africa	Lansdowne Road, Dublin
			Try: Frankie Waring, Morris Zimerman; Pen: Bennie Osler	Referee: MA Allan (Scotland)

5 December 1931	Wales	3–8	South Africa	St. Helens, Swansea
			Try: Ferdie Bergh, George Daneel; Con: Bennie Osler	Referee: Edgar Holmes (England)

== 1920s ==
1920s record

Games played	Won	Lost	Drawn	Win percentage
11	6	3	2	54.5%

=== 1928 ===
1928 record

Games played	Won	Lost	Drawn	Win percentage
4	2	2	0	50%

1 September 1928	South Africa	5–13	New Zealand	Newlands Stadium, Cape Town
	Try: JC van der Westhuizen; Con: Bennie Osler			Referee: Adv. Boet Neser (South Africa)

18 August 1928	South Africa	11–6	New Zealand	Crusaders (St George's Park), Port Elizabeth
	Try: Phil Nel, George Daneel, Manus de Jongh; Con: Bennie Osler			Referee: Adv. Boet Neser (South Africa)

21 July 1928	South Africa	6–7	New Zealand	Ellis Park Stadium, Johannesburg
	Pen: Phil Mostert, Bennie Osler			Referee: Adv. Boet Neser (South Africa)

30 June 1928	South Africa	17–0	New Zealand	Kingsmead, Durban
	Try: Jack Slater; Pen: Bennie Osler 2 Drop: Bennie Osler 2			Referee: Adv. Boet Neser (South Africa)

=== 1924 ===
1924 record;

Games played	Won	Lost	Drawn	Win percentage
4	3	0	1	75%

20 September 1924	South Africa	16–6	British Isles	Newlands Stadium, Cape Town
	Try: Jack Slater, Jack Bester, Kenny Starke 2 Drop: Kenny Starke 2		Try: Stan Harris, Tom Voyce	Referee: Billy Millar (South Africa)

13 September 1924	South Africa	3–3	British Isles	Crusaders (St George's Park), Port Elizabeth
	Try: Jack van Druten		Try: Bill Cunningham	Referee: Billy Millar (South Africa)

23 August 1924	South Africa	17–0	British Isles	Wanderers, Johannesburg
	Try: Phil Mostert, Jack van Druten, Kenny Starke, PK Albertyn; Con: Bennie Osler; Pen: Bennie Osler			Referee: Adv. Boet Neser (South Africa)

16 August 1924	South Africa	7–3	British Isles	Kingsmead, Durban
	Try: Hans Aucamp; Drop: Bennie Osler		Try: Rowe Harding	Referee: Lionel Oakley (South Africa)

=== 1921 ===
1921 record

Games played	Won	Lost	Drawn	Win percentage
3	1	1	1	33%

17 September 1921	New Zealand	0–0	South Africa	Athletic Park, Wellington
				Referee: Alf Neilson (New Zealand)

27 August 1921	New Zealand	5–9	South Africa	Eden Park, Auckland
			Try: Billy Sendin; Con: Gerhard Morkel; Drop: Gerhard Morkel	Referee: Alf Neilson (New Zealand)

13 August 1921	New Zealand	13–5	South Africa	Carisbrook, Dunedin
			Try: Attie van Heerden; Con: Gerhard Morkel	Referee: Edward McKenzie (New Zealand)

== 1910s ==
1910s record

Games played	Won	Lost	Drawn	Win percentage
8	7	1	0	87.5%

=== 1913 ===
1913 record

Games played	Won	Lost	Drawn	Win percentage
2	2	0	0	100%

11 January 1913	France	5–38	South Africa	Le Bouscat, Bordeaux
			Try: Sep Ledger, Joe Francis, Boy Morkel, Boetie McHardy 2, Dick Luyt, Jacky Morkel, Dougie Morkel 2 Con: Jacky Morkel 2, Dougie Morkel 2 Pen: Dougie Morkel	Referee: Tom Williams (Wales)

4 January 1913	England	3–9	South Africa	Twickenham, London
			Try: Jacky Morkel; Pen: Dougie Morkel 2	Referee: John D Tulloch (Scotland)

=== 1912 ===
1912 record

Games played	Won	Lost	Drawn	Win percentage
3	3	0	0	100%

14 December 1912	Wales	0–3	South Africa	Cardiff Arms Park, Cardiff
			Pen: Dougie Morkel	Referee: Frank Potter-Irwin (England)

30 November 1912	Ireland	0–38	South Africa	Lansdowne Road, Dublin
			Try: Joe Francis, Billy Millar, Boetie McHardy 3, Jacky Morkel 2, Jan Stegmann 3 Con: Lammetjie Luyt, Gerhard Morkel 3	Referee: John D Tulloch (Scotland)

23 November 1912	Scotland	0–16	South Africa	Inverleith, Edinburgh
			Try: Boy Morkel, Boetie McHardy, Jan Stegmann 2 Con: Gerhard Morkel, Dougie Morkel	Referee: Frank Potter-Irwin (England)

=== 1910 ===
1910 record

Games played	Won	Lost	Drawn	Win percentage
3	2	1	0	66%

3 September 1910	South Africa	21–5	British Isles	Newlands Stadium, Cape Town
	Try: Gideon Roos, Koot Reynecke, Lammetjie Luyt, Percy Allport; Con: Dougie Morkel 3 Pen: Dougie Morkel			Referee: Reg Stanton (South Africa)

27 August 1910	South Africa	3–8	British Isles	Crusaders (St George's Park), Port Elizabeth
	Try: Wally Mills			Referee: Reg Stanton (South Africa)

6 August 1910	South Africa	14–10	British Isles	Wanderers, Johannesburg
	Try: Cocky Hahn, Dirkie de Villiers, Lammetjie Luyt, Dougie Morkel; Con: Dougie Morkel			Referee: Reg Stanton (South Africa)

== 1900s ==
1900s record

Games played	Won	Lost	Drawn	Win percentage
7	3	1	3	42.9%

=== 1906 ===
1906 record

Games played	Won	Lost	Drawn	Win percentage
4	2	1	1	50%

8 December 1906	England	3–3	South Africa	Crystal Palace, London
			Try: Billy Millar	Referee: John D Tulloch (Scotland)

1 December 1906	Wales	0–11	South Africa	St. Helens, Swansea
			Try: Klondyke Raaff, Bob Loubser, Stevie Joubert; Con: Stevie Joubert	Referee: AO Jones (England)

24 November 1906	Ireland	12–15	South Africa	Ravenhill Grounds, Belfast
			Try: Anton Stegmann, Japie Krige, Bob Loubser 2 Pen: Stevie Joubert	Referee: John D Tulloch (Scotland)

17 November 1906	Scotland	6–0	South Africa	Hampden Park, Glasgow
				Referee: Henry Corley (Ireland)

=== 1903 ===
1903 record

Games played	Won	Lost	Drawn	Win percentage
3	1	0	2	33%

12 September 1903	South Africa	8–0	British Isles	Newlands Stadium, Cape Town
	Try: Joe Barry, Alec Reid; Con: Fairy Heatlie			Referee: Biddy Anderson (South Africa)

5 September 1903	South Africa	0–0	British Isles	Kimberley Athletic Club Ground, Kimberley
				Referee: Percy Day (South Africa)

29 August 1903	South Africa	10–10	British Isles	Wanderers, Johannesburg
	Try: Uncle Dobbin, Alex Frew; Con: Fairy Heatlie 2			Referee: William Donaldson (England)

== 1890s ==
1890s record

Games played	Won	Lost	Drawn	Win percentage
7	1	6	0	14.3%

=== 1896 ===
1896 record

Games played	Won	Lost	Drawn	Win percentage
4	1	3	0	25%

5 September 1896	South Africa	5–0	British Isles	Newlands Stadium, Cape Town
	Try: Alf Larard; Con: Tommy Hepburn			Referee: Alf Richards (South Africa)

29 August 1896	South Africa	3–9	British Isles	Kimberley Athletic Club Ground, Kimberley
	Try: Percy Twentyman-Jones			Referee: William Bisset (South Africa)

22 August 1896	South Africa	8–17	British Isles	Wanderers Stadium, Johannesburg
	Try: Theo Samuels 2 Con: Davey Cope			Referee: Gordon Beves (South Africa)

30 July 1896	South Africa	0–8	British Isles	Crusaders Ground, Port Elizabeth
				Referee: Henry Kemsley (South Africa)

=== 1891 ===
1891 record

Games played	Won	Lost	Drawn	Win percentage
3	0	3	0	0%

5 September 1891	South Africa	0–4	British Isles	Newlands Stadium, Cape Town
				Referee: Herbert Hayton Castens (South Africa)

29 August 1891	South Africa	0–3	British Isles	Eclectic Cricket Ground, Kimberley
				Referee: Percy Ross-Frames (South Africa)

30 July 1891	South Africa	0–4	British Isles	Crusaders Ground, Port Elizabeth
				Referee: Dr. John Griffin (South Africa)
