= 1951–52 South Africa rugby union tour of Europe =

Summary
P	W	D	L
Total
31	30	0	1
Test match
5	5	0	0
Opponent
P	W	D	L
Scotland
1	1	0	0
Ireland
1	1	0	0
Wales
1	1	0	0
England
1	1	0	0
France
1	1	0	0

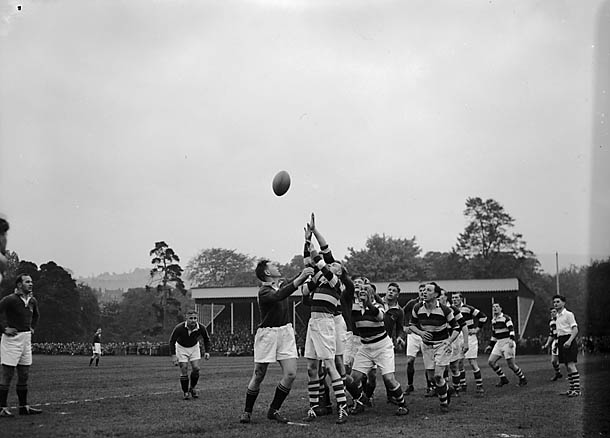
The Springboks match against a combined Newbridge and Pontypool team at Pontypool Park on 18th October 1951

In 1951–52 the South Africa national rugby union team toured England, France, Ireland, Scotland, and Wales, playing a series of test matches, as well as games against club, regional, and representative teams. South Africa accomplished their third Grand Slam by winning all four tests against the Home Nations sides, and also won the test match against France. This was the sixth South Africa tour and the fourth tour of the Northern Hemisphere. It was also the first time the South Africans played the invitational British Barbarian team.

The tour was the most successful the South African team had undertaken; the team only lost a single match. In the tests played the team beat all four Home Nations, France and the Barbarians. The only team to beat the Springboks was the invitational London Counties team. The final tour record saw 31 matches played, with South Africa winning 30 and losing just the one game.

== Touring party ==
=== Management ===
- Managers: F.W. Mellish, Danie Craven
- Captain: Basil Kenyon

=== Full backs ===
- Johnny Buchler (Transvaal)
- Jakkals Keevy (Eastern Transavaal)

=== Three-quarters ===
- Paul Johnstone (Western Province)
- Tjol Lategan (Western Province)
- Buks Marais (Boland)
- Chum Ochse (Western Province)
- Cowboy Saunders (Border)
- Ryk van Schoor (Rhodesia)
- Des Sinclair (Transvaal)
- Basie Vivier (Orange Free State)

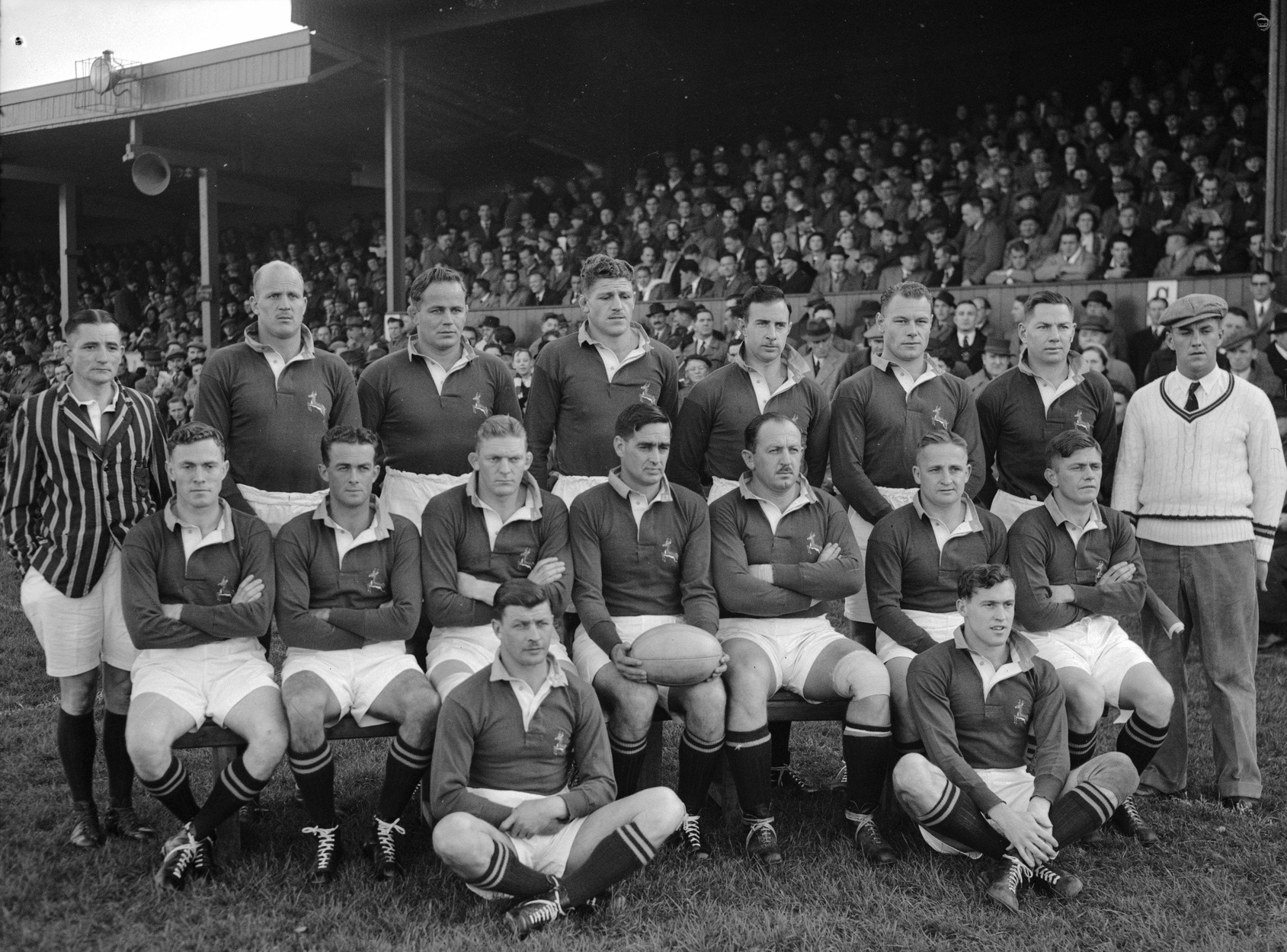
Llanelli versus Springbok match at Stradey Park

=== Half backs ===
- Hannes Brewis (Northern Transvaal)
- Dennis Fry (Western Province)
- Hansie Oelofse (Transvaal)
- Fonnie du Toit (Northern Transvaal)

=== Forwards ===
- Willem Barnard (Griqualand West)
- Jaap Bekker (Northern Transvaal)
- G. Dannhauser (Transvaal)
- Willem Delport (Eastern Province)
- Ernst Dinkelmann (Northern Transvaal)
- Stephen Fry (Western Province)
- Okey Geffin (Transvaal)
- Basil Kenyon (Border) capt.
- A.C. Koch (Boland)
- Hennie Muller (Transvaal)
- B. Myburgh (Eastern Transvaal)
- Jan Pickard (Western Province)
- Salty du Rand (Rhodesia)
- F.E.B. van der Ryst (Transvaal)
- P.W. Wessels (Orange Free State)
- Basie van Wyk (Transvaal)

== Results ==
	Date	Opponent	Location	Result	Score
Match 1	10 October 1951	South East Counties	Bournemouth	Won	31–6
Match 2	13 October	South West Counties	Plymouth	Won	17–8
Match 3	18 October	Pontypool and Newbridge	Pontypool	Won	15–6
Match 4	20 October	Cardiff	Pontypool Park, Pontypool	Won	11–9
Match 5	23 October	Llanelli	Stradey Park, Llanelli	Won	20–11
Match 6	27 October	North West Counties	Birkenhead Park	Won	16–9
Match 7	31 October	Glasgow - Edinburgh	Old Anniesland, Glasgow	Won	43–11
Match 8	3 November	North East Counties	Gosforth	Won	19–8
Match 9	8 November	Cambridge University	Cambridge	Won	30–0
Match 10	10 November	London Counties	Twickenham, London	Lost	9–11
Match 12	15 November	Oxford University	Oxford	Won	24–3
Match 12	17 November	Aberavon and Neath	Aberavon	Won	22–0
Match 13	24 November	SCOTLAND	Murrayfield, Edinburgh	Won	44–0
Match 14	28 November	North of Scotland	Aberdeen	Won	14–3
Match 15	1 December	Ulster	Ravenhill, Belfast	Won	27–5
Match 16	8 December	IRELAND	Dublin	Won	17–5
Match 17	11 December	Munster	Limerick	Won	11–6
Match 18	15 December	Swansea	St Helens, Swansea	Won	11–3
Match 19	22 December	WALES	Cardiff Arms Park, Cardiff	Won	6–3
Match 20	26 December	Combined Services	Twickenham, London	Won	24–8
Match 21	29 December	East Midlands	Leicester	Won	3–0
Match 22	5 January 1952	ENGLAND	Twickenham, London	Won	8–3
Match 23	10 January	Newport	Rodney Parade, Newport	Won	12–6
Match 24	12 January	Western Counties	Bristol	Won	16–5
Match 25	16 January	Midlands Counties	Coventry	Won	19–8
Match 26	19 January	South of Scotland	Hawick	Won	13–3
Match 27	26 January	Barbarians	Cardiff Arms Park, Cardiff	Won	17–3
Match 28	2 February	South East France	Lyons	Won	9–3
Match 29	7 February	South West France	Bordeaux	Won	20–12
Match 30	9 February	France B	Toulouse	Won	9–6
Match 31	16 February	FRANCE	Paris	Won	25–3

== The matches ==
=== Cardiff ===
20 October 1951

Cardiff	9–11	South Africa
Try: Williams; Pen: Tamplin (2)		Try: Ochse (2); Oelofse; Con: Brewis

Cardiff Arms Park
Attendance: 53,000
Referee: C Joynson (Wales)

Cardiff: Frank Trott, Haydn Morris, Bleddyn Williams, Jack Matthews (capt.), Alun Thomas, Cliff Morgan, Rex Willis, Arthur Hull, Geoff Beckingham, Cliff Davies, Bill Tamplin, Malcolm Collins, Sid Judd, Des O'Brien, CD Williams

South Africa: JU Buchler, MJ Saunders, MT Lategan, RA van Schoor, JK Ochse, JD Brewis, JS Oelofse, HJ Bekker, PW Wessels, AC Kosh, SP Fry, WHM Barnard, E Dinkelmann, CJ van Wyk, HSV Muller

=== Scotland ===
24 November 1951

Scotland	0–44	South Africa
		Try: Delport; Dinkelmann du Rand; Koch (2); Lategan; Muller van Schoor van Wyk; Con: Geffin (7); Drop: Brewis

Murrayfield
Attendance: 65,000
Referee: MJ Dowling Ireland

Scotland: Dod Burrell, John Hart, Donald Scott, Oliver Turnbull, David Rose, Angus Cameron (capt), Arthur Dorward, Hamish Dawson, John Macphail, Bob Wilson, James Johnston, Hamish Inglis, Doug Elliot, Bob Taylor, Peter Kininmonth

South Africa: Johnny Buchler, Buks Marais, Tjol Lategan, Ryk van Schoor, Paul Johnstone, Hannes Brewis, Fonnie du Toit, Chris Koch, Willa Delport, Okey Geffin, Salty du Rand, Ernst Dinkelmann, Basie van Wyk, Stephen Fry, Hennie Muller (capt)

=== Ireland ===
8 December 1951

Ireland	5–17	South Africa
Try: Browne; Con: Murphy		Try: Ochse; Van Schoor van Wyk (2); Con: Geffin; Drop: Brewis

Lansdowne Road
Attendance: 47,000
Referee: W.C.W. Murdoch (Scotland)

Ireland: Gerry Murphy, William McKee, Noel Henderson, Antony Browne, Mick Lane, Jackie Kyle, John O'Meara, Tom Clifford, Karl Mullen, John Hartley Smith, Patrick Lawlor, Robin Thompson, Bill McKay, Jim McCarthy, Des O'Brien (capt)

South Africa: JU Buchler, PG Johnstone, RA van Schoor, MT Lategan, JK Ochse, JD Brewis, E Dinkelmann, A Geffin, WH Delport, AC Kosh, SP Fry, WHM Barnard, JD du Rand, CJ van Wyk, HSV Muller

=== Wales ===
22 December 1951

Wales	3–6	South Africa
Try: Williams		Try: Ochse; Drop: Brewis

Cardiff Arms Park
Attendance: 55,000
Referee: NH Lambert Ireland

Wales: Gerwyn Williams (Llanelli), Ken Jones (Newport), Malcolm Thomas (Newport), Bleddyn Williams (Cardiff), Lewis Jones (Llanelli), Cliff Morgan (Cardiff), Rex Willis (Cardiff), Billy Williams (Swansea), Dai Davies (Somerset Police), Don Hayward (Newbridge), Rees Stephens (Neath), Roy John (Neath), Len Blyth (Swansea), John Gwilliam (Edinburgh Wanderers) (capt.), Allen Forward (Pontypool)

South Africa: JU Buchler, PG Johnstone, RA van Schoor, MT Lategan, JK Ochse, JD Brewis, PA du Toit, A Geffin, WH Delport, AC Kosh, SP Fry, WHM Barnard, JD du Rand, CJ van Wyk, HSV Muller

=== England ===
5 January 1952

England	3–8	South Africa
Try: Winn		Try: du Toit; Con: Muller; Pen: Muller

Twickenham Stadium
Attendance: 65,000
Referee: W.C.W. Murdoch (Scotland)

England: Bill Hook, Ted Woodward, Albert Agar, Lewis Cannell, Chris Winn, Nim Hall (capt), Gordon Rimmer, Wally Holmes, Eric Evans, Bob Stirling, John Matthews, Squire Wilkins, Don White, Alec Lewis, John Kendall-Carpenter

South Africa: Johnny Buchler, Paul Johnstone, Tjol Lategan, Ryk van Schoor, Chum Ochse, Hannes Brewis, Fonnie du Toit, Chris Koch, Willa Delport, Jaap Bekker, Salty du Rand, Ernst Dinkelmann, Basie van Wyk, Stephen Fry, Hennie Muller (capt)

=== Barbarians ===
26 January 1952

Barbarian F.C.	3–17	South Africa
Try: Elliot		Try: Ochse van Wyk; Con: Keevy; Pen: Keevy (2); Johnstone

Cardiff Arms Park
Attendance: 55,000
Referee: MJ Dowling Ireland

Barbarians: Gerwyn Williams (Llanelli), Ken Jones (Newport), Bleddyn Williams (Cardiff), LB Cannell (St. Mary's Hospital), Ted Woodward (Wasps), Cliff Morgan (Cardiff), Rex Willis (Cardiff), John Kendall-Carpenter (Penzance), Dai Davies (Somerset Police), RV Stirling (RAF), Rees Stephens (Neath), Roy John (Neath), Doug Elliot (Edinburgh Academicals), JE Nelson (Malone) (capt.), VG Roberts(Harlequins)

South Africa: AC Keevy, PG Johnstone, RA van Schoor, FP Marais, JK Ochse, MT Lategan, PA du Toit, HJ Bekker, WH Delport, FEB van der Ryst, SP Fry, E Dinkelmann, JM du Rand, CJ van Wyk, HSV Muller

=== France ===
16 February 1952

France	3–25	South Africa
Drop: Carabignac		Try: Delport; Dinkelmann; Johnstone (2); Muller van Wyk; Con: Johnstone; Muller; Pen: Johnstone

Stade Olympique Yves-du-Manoir
Attendance: 35,000
Referee: MJ Dowling (Ireland)

France: Pierre Guilleux, Georges Brun, Jacques Mauran, Maurice Prat, Jean Colombier, Georges Carabignac, Gerard Dufau, René Biénès, Paul Labadie, René Brejassou, Lucien Mias, Bernard Chevallier, Jean Prat, Jean-Roger Bourdeu, Guy Basquet (capt)

South Africa:

== Bibliography ==
- Billot, John (1974). Springboks in Wales. Ferndale: Ron Jones Publications.
- Smith, David; Williams, Gareth (1980). Fields of Praise: The Official History of The Welsh Rugby Union. Cardiff: University of Wales Press. ISBN 0-7083-0766-3.
- Stent, R.K. (1952). The Fourth Springboks 1951–1952. London: Longmans, Green and Co.
