= Morné du Plessis =

South African rugby union player

- Born: Morné du Plessis; 21 October 1949 (age 77) Vereeniging, South Africa
- Height: 1.95 m (6 ft 5 in)
- Weight: 95.25 kg (15 st 0 lb)
- School: Grey College, Bloemfontein
- University: Stellenbosch University
- Notable relative: Felix du Plessis (Father)

Rugby union career
- Position: Number 8 or Flank
Provincial / State sides
Years	Team	Apps	(Points)
1971–1980	Western Province	112	
International career
Years	Team	Apps	(Points)
1971–1980	South Africa	22	(12)

Morné du Plessis OIS (Afrikaans: [mɔrˈneː du plɛˈsi]; born 21 October 1949) is a former South African rugby union player often described as one of the Springboks' most successful captains. During the five years from 1975 to 1980 that he served as captain, the Springboks won 13 of 15 matches, giving Du Plessis an 86.66% success rate as captain.

Du Plessis's father, Felix, was also the captain of a Springbok rugby team, and his mother, Pat, captained the South African women's hockey side. Felix and Morné are the only father-and-son duo so far to have both been Springbok rugby captains, and Morné is the only Springbok captain born to parents both of whom captained national sports sides. Morné du Plessis was appointed manager of the 1995 Springbok team which won the 1995 Rugby World Cup.

Du Plessis co-founded with Tim Noakes both the Sports Science Institute of South Africa in Cape Town, and the Bioenergetics of Exercise Research Unit of the University of Cape Town and the Medical Research Council (renamed UCT/MRC Research Unit for Exercise Science and Sports Medicine in 2000).

== Early life and career ==
Du Plessis was born 21 October 1949 in Vereeniging, several sources incorrectly identify Krugersdorp as Du Plessis' town of birth, including the International Rugby Hall of Fame and ESPN Scrum. But in an interview Du Plessis pointed to Vereeniging as his place of birth, and this is confirmed in his profile on the Springboks' official site, and on the South African government's national orders. into a sporting family. His mother, Pat (née Smethurst) captained South Africa's women's national hockey side in 1954. A maternal uncle, Horace, was captain of the national soccer team that toured Australia and New Zealand in 1947.

His father, Felix, was born on 24 November 1919 in Steynsburg, in the Cape Province. Playing at lock, Felix made his debut for South Africa on 16 July 1949 at Newlands Stadium, Cape Town against the touring All Blacks, led by Fred Allen. His team – which included Springbok greats Tjol Lategan, Hannes Brewis, Okey Geffin, and Hennie Muller – swept the series 3 – 0. Six weeks after the last test, Morné was born. Felix worked as a representative for South African Breweries, then relocated to Vereeniging to manage Iscor's sport and recreation department. He moved to Stilfontein, where he opened a liquor store, one of the first shops in town. Morné recalls his father as a gentle and retiring person, who only started watching his son play rugby once he was at Stellenbosch. Felix Du Plessis died at Stilfontein in 1978 at the age of 58, having played only the three tests against New Zealand.

Du Plessis matriculated from Grey College, Bloemfontein in 1966, where he had excelled at cricket more than at rugby. While he was not chosen for the Free State Craven Week side, he was included in the 1966 South African Schools XI as a seam bowler. He first played fly-half at school, but was moved to centre to make room for future Springbok Dawie Snyman.

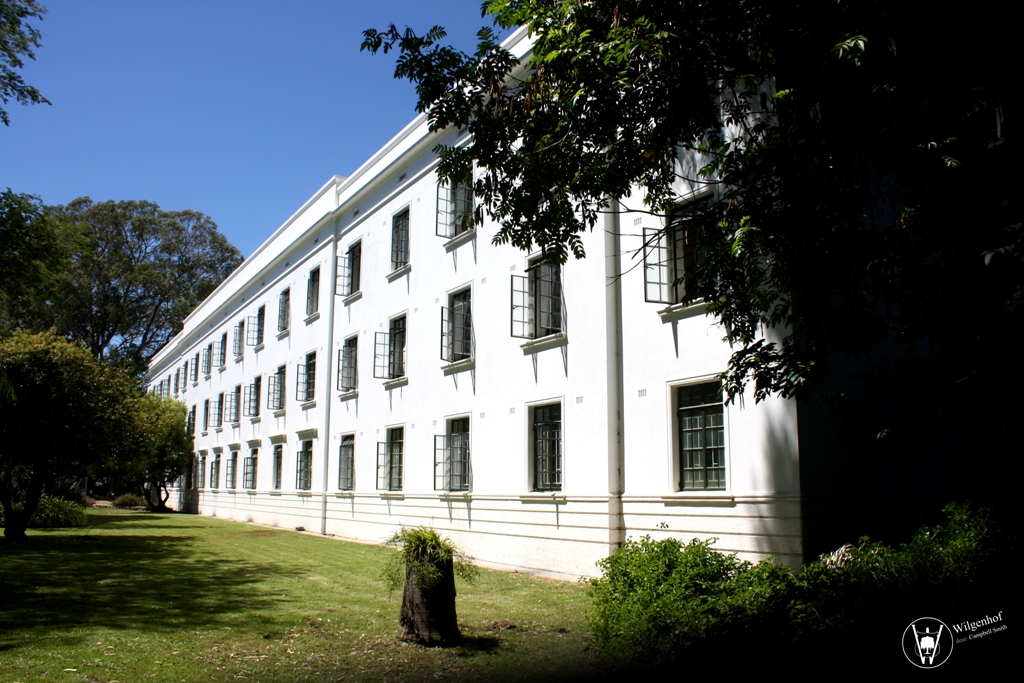
Stellenbosch University's Wilgenhof, where Du Plessis lived as a student.

Du Plessis completed his national service at the Naval Gymnasium in Saldanha Bay in 1967.

From 1968 to 1972 he studied Industrial Psychology at Stellenbosch University, graduating with a Bachelor of Arts (Honours) degree. Du Plessis lodged at the university's Wilgenhof men's residence. Built in 1903, Wilgenhof is not only the oldest university men's residence in South Africa, but also once housed the future Springbok and South African rugby administrator Danie Craven himself – both as a student, and as administrator. Craven was the resident principal of Wilgenhof during the period that Du Plessis lived there.

At Stellenbosch Du Plessis was initially more interested in cricket than rugby; he had chosen to go there because of his desire to play in the university cricket team. In 1971 his prowess at cricket earned him selection to the South African Universities cricket side, and then to the Western Province team during that same year. Playing five first-class cricket matches as a right-arm medium pace bowler, he took 16 wickets at an average of 25.62 runs per wicket, and turned in a best performance of 4 wickets for 71 runs. But when Barry Richards, opening batsman of the South African and of the Natal cricket sides, hit Du Plessis for two sixes in the final over before lunch during a Castle Cup match between Western Province and Natal, he decided that perhaps he should rather concentrate on rugby.

But being on a campus where rugby predominates sports, and living in a residence with a strong rugby tradition, Du Plessis inevitably turned his attention to the oval-ball game. He recalled, " 'when you go to Stellenbosch to play cricket, it is like going to India to play rugby' ". After his first year of rugby at Stellenbosch he was chosen at lock for Maties's first team, and was later selected for Province's U-20 team in the same position. Despite Du Plessis' 1.95 m (6 ft 5 in) frame, coach Craven considered him too small to be a lock, and moved him to eighthman. Du Plessis was selected to the Western Province rugby team in 1971, and eventually appointed captain. His 103 matches as captain for Province is still a record today.

== International career ==
Du Plessis made his test debut with the 1971 Springboks touring party that went to Australia for a three test series. The test team included Joggie Jansen, Syd Nomis, Frik du Preez, Jan Ellis, and Piet Greyling. Du Plessis played eighthman in all three tests, which the Springboks won 18–6 in Sydney, 14–6 in Brisbane, and 19–11 in Sydney.

Noted for being outspoken by Craven, Du Plessis was soon in trouble with South Africa's rugby administration for wearing denim trousers with his Springbok blazer. His liberal views, in which he was influenced by Frederik van Zyl Slabbert, and his subsequent support for the Progressive Federal Party, also ran afoul of the conservative politics of rugby administrators. Nor was Du Plessis a stranger to controversial incidents during his domestic and international career. In the 1975 Springbok trials prior to the French tour, Du Plessis punched Kleintjie Grobler, knocking out the man that a journalist later described as "pesky" and an "enforcer". Du Plessis and Grobler then played together on the national team against the Tricoleres that year. But probably the most notable incident involved Naas Botha, whom Du Plessis injured with a bone-crunching late tackle in the 1977 Currie Cup semifinal between Province and Northern Transvaal. The subsequent penalty kick by full-back Pierre Edwards was successful, and Province lost the match 17–15. The Loftus Versfeld faithful was so incensed that Du Plessis had to be escorted off the field by the police.

In 1974 the Springboks faced the touring British Lions, who swept through South Africa without a loss. Winning 19 of their 20 matches on South African soil (plus one in Namibia and another in Rhodesia), the Lions drew only in the last test match, 13-all. Along the way they smashed the hapless South Western Districts 97–0 at the Van Riebeeck Ground, with J. J. Williams scoring 6 tries, and Alan Old converting 15 times. Du Plessis played in the first two tests (8th man and flank) and was dropped for the third. The series was noted for the selectors' use of 33 players in an attempt to stem the British tide – only three men played in all four tests, namely Hannes Marais, Jan Ellis and right wing, Chris Pope.

At the end of the 1974 season Du Plessis turned out for the Springbok tour to France, playing in two tests against France which South Africa won 13–4 (at Toulouse) 10–8 (at Parc des Princes). For the return tour by the French in 1975, Du Plessis was appointed Springbok captain. He made a successful start as skipper with the Springboks defeating the French 38–25 in Bloemfontein in the first test, and winning 33–18 in Pretoria in the second.

In 1976 he led the Springboks in a tough four-test series against the All Blacks. The Springboks won the first test 16–7, but lost the second 15–9. But Du Plessis and his men bounced back in the third test, winning 15–10. The Springboks took the victory in a 15–14 win over the New Zealanders in the fourth and final test. The following year he led the Springboks to victory, 45–24, over a World XV side in Pretoria. Although anti-apartheid boycotts were increasingly isolating South African sports teams, the Springboks played two matches against the South American Jaguars in 1980, made up mainly of Argentinian players. South Africa won 24–9 in Johannesburg and 18–9 in Durban. Du Plessis captained the Springboks to a 3–1 victory in 1980's home test series against the British Lions and led the team on the 1980 South Africa rugby union tour of South America in October although an injury sustained in a Currie Cup match restricted him to just two matches, including only one of the internationals against the South American Jaguars.

Du Plessis's sudden decision to stop playing rugby before the 1981 tour to New Zealand was motivated by a combination of mental fatigue and the death of his Western Province teammate, full-back Chris Burger in a Currie Cup match. Playing under Du Plessis' leadership against Free State at Bloemfontein in 1980, 28-year-old Burger died after incurring a neck injury, sustained either while being tackled by two players or during the subsequent loose scrum. Craven tried to convince Du Plessis to continue playing, and remained convinced that if Du Plessis had made himself available for the tour, South Africa would have won the series.

In all Du Plessis played in 32 matches for South Africa, and was on the winning side 18 times in 22 tests. Under his captaincy the Springboks won thirteen matches and lost only twice.

== International caps ==
No.	Opposition	Result (SA 1st)	Position	Tries	Date	Venue
1.	Australia	19–11	Number 8		17 July 1971	Sydney Cricket Ground, Sydney
2.	Australia	14–6	Number 8		31 July 1971	Brisbane Exhibition Ground, Brisbane
3.	Australia	18–6	Number 8		7 August 1971	Sydney Cricket Ground, Sydney
4.	British and Irish Lions	3–12	Number 8		8 June 1974	Newlands Stadium, Cape Town
5.	British and Irish Lions	9–28	Flank		22 June 1974	Loftus Versfeld Stadium, Pretoria
6.	France	13–4	Number 8		23 November 1974	Stade Municipal, Toulouse
7.	France	10–8	Number 8		30 November 1974	Parc des Princes, Paris
8.	France	38–25	Number 8		21 June 1975	Free State Stadium, Bloemfontein
9.	France	33–18	Number 8	1	28 June 1975	Loftus Versfeld Stadium, Pretoria
10.	New Zealand	16–7	Number 8		24 July 1976	Kings Park Stadium, Durban
11.	New Zealand	9–15	Number 8		14 August 1976	Free State Stadium, Bloemfontein
12.	New Zealand	15–10	Number 8		4 September 1976	Newlands Stadium, Cape Town
13.	New Zealand	15–14	Number 8		18 September 1976	Ellis Park Stadium, Johannesburg
14.	World XV	45–24	Number 8		27 August 1977	Loftus Versfeld Stadium, Pretoria
15.	South America	24–9	Number 8		26 April 1980	Wanderers Stadium, Johannesburg
16.	South America	18–9	Number 8	1	3 May 1980	Kings Park Stadium, Durban
17.	British and Irish Lions	26–22	Number 8		31 May 1980	Newlands Stadium, Cape Town
18.	British and Irish Lions	26–19	Number 8		14 June 1980	Free State Stadium, Bloemfontein
19.	British and Irish Lions	12–10	Number 8		28 June 1980	Boet Erasmus Stadium, Port Elizabeth
20.	British and Irish Lions	13–17	Number 8		12 July 1980	Loftus Versfeld Stadium, Pretoria
21.	South America	30–16	Number 8	1	25 October 1980	Prince of Wales Cricket Club, Santiago
22.	France	37–15	Number 8		8 November 1980	Loftus Versfeld Stadium, Pretoria

== Legacy ==
=== Impact ===
Apart from co-founding the Sports Science Institute, he established the Chris Burger Fund in 1980, of which he was the chairman for 38 years. Now called the Chris Burger Pedro Jackson Players' Fund, the organization raises funds for the financial support of seriously or catastrophically injured South African rugby players and aims to create education to reduce injuries in the sport. The Fund established a 24-hour toll-free helpline for access to emergency response services in cases of serious rugby injuries.

He was elected a member of the Laureus World Sports Academy, and appointed chair of the Laureus Sport for Good Foundation (South Africa). Laureus raised R260m to improve the living conditions of disadvantaged youth, aiding 11 projects in South Africa and some 70 worldwide.

Wellington Lions loose forward Du'Plessis Kirifi is named after Du Plessis.

=== Honours ===
Du Plessis was nominated as South Africa's Rugby Player of the Year in 1976, 1977, 1979 and 1980.

In 1999 he was inducted into the International Rugby Hall of Fame, and in 2006 into the South African Sports and Arts Hall of Fame.

In 2007 Du Plessis was awarded the Order of Ikhamanga in Silver from the South African Government for "excellent achievement in rugby...and promoting the use of sport for social change".

== Personal life ==
Du Plessis is married and has two sons and a daughter.

== Business interests ==
Du Plessis was first involved in marketing sports goods, and then established Sports Plan (Pty) Ltd to develop "top-quality sports, service and medical facilities". Sports Plan was absorbed into Sail (Pty) Ltd, and Du Plessis became a director in the Sail Group (rebranded MARC Group Ltd.). Sail specializes in "high performance management...event creation and ownership, rights commercialization". The MARC Group owns 50% of the Blue Bulls Company, and 24.9% of both Western Province Rugby and Griffons Rugby. Sail also manages the Sports Science Institute.

Initially involved with the Stade de France company in developing and managing Cape Town Stadium for the 2010 FIFA World Cup, Sail withdrew from the project in 2010. Du Plessis, then the Executive Chair of the Sail de Stade Operating Company, explained that the creation of the stadium did not make financial sense for the group's shareholders. He emphasized that the stadium was an asset and a "' brilliant facility' ", and although the costs of managing the stadium were significant, they should not pose an insurmountable problem for the City of Cape Town.

== See also ==
- List of South Africa national rugby union players – Springbok no. 455

== Publications ==
- Noakes, Tim & Morné du Plessis, Rugby Without Risk: A Practical Guide to the Prevention and Treatment of Rugby Injuries (Pretoria: Van Schaik, 1996).

Sporting positions
Preceded by Piet Greyling	Springbok Captain; 1975–1980	Succeeded by Theuns Stofberg
