= Paul Johnstone =

South African rugby union player

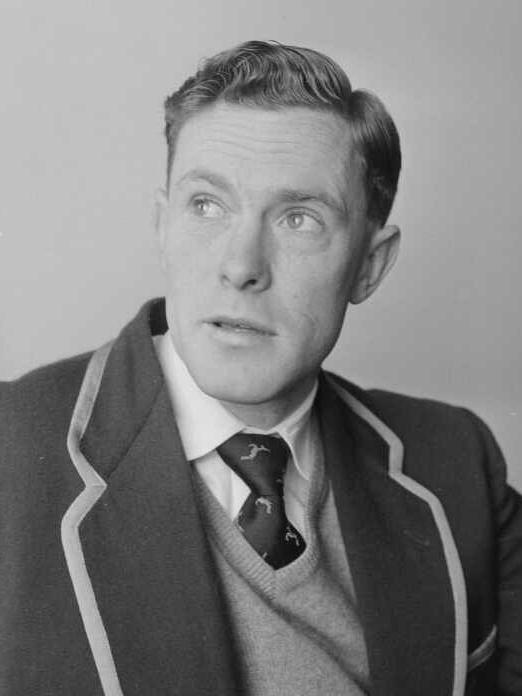
- Johnstone in New Zealand in 1956
- Born: Paul Geoffrey Allen Johnstone; 30 June 1930 Johannesburg, South Africa
- Died: 22 April 1996 (aged 65) Hermanus, South Africa
- Height: 1.75 m (5 ft 9 in)
- Weight: 73 kg (11 st 7 lb)
- School: Hilton College
- University: University of Cape Town

Rugby union career
- Position(s): Wing, Centre
Amateur team(s)
Years	Team	Apps	(Points)
- Blackheath F.C.
- University of Cape Town
1952–55	Oxford University RFC		
Provincial / State sides
Years	Team	Apps	(Points)
- Natal
-	Western Province		
International career
Years	Team	Apps	(Points)
1951–56	South Africa	9	(11)

Paul Geoffrey Allen Johnstone (30 June 1930 – 22 April 1996) was a South African rugby union wing. Johnstone played club rugby in South Africa for Paarl, Hamiltons, Villagers, Pirates and Berea Rovers; and in the UK for Blackheath He played provincial rugby for both Natal and Western Province. He was capped for South Africa nine times between 1951 and 1956 first representing the team on the 1951–52 South Africa rugby tour of Great Britain, Ireland and France. The touring team is seen as one of the greatest South African teams, winning 30 of the 31 matches, including all five internationals.

== Personal history ==
Johnstone was born in Johannesburg, South Africa in 1930. He was educated at Hilton College, leaving school at the age of 19. He soon after took a trip to England working as a clerk in London. On returning to South Africa he enrolled at the University of Cape Town where he became a law student. In 1952 he returned to the United Kingdom and entered St John's College, Oxford, to read law. He graduated B.A. in 1955. He played for the OURFC in each of his three years at Oxford University, earning his 'Blue' on each occasion, and in the season 1954-55 he was Captain of the OURFC. He married Josephine Booth and had three children: Amanda (Mandy), Louise and Matthew. For many years he was general manager of South African Breweries in Salisbury, Rhodesia (now Harare, Zimbabwe). He died in Hermanus, Western Cape on 22 April 1996.

== Rugby career ==
Johnstone played rugby from school age, selected for province side Natal at the age of 19. While working in London he played club rugby for Blackheath. After his return to South Africa, he turned out for the University of Cape Town. Johnstone was the surprise choice for the Sprinkboks tour of Britain. At the Newland Trials he began the week in the eighth choice team, before advancing into the first team for the main game on the last day. His rise during the trials was surprising, as his form at club level leading up to the trials had been very poor. There was talk of him being dropped to the university second team, and he was injured in his second appearance of the trial where there was doubt that he would be able to play again for some time.

=== 1951 Tour to Great Britain ===
Despite being unfancied before the tour and possessing no international experience, he became a regular team member of the tour appearing in 18 of the 31 matches, and was the only wing to play in all five international games. Johnstone finished the tour as the fourth highest scorer, with 43 points (11 tries, 2 penalties and 2 conversions).

The tour managers choose to place the four wing players on rotation. Johnstone and Saunders were chosen for the first game, against a combined South-Eastern Counties team at Bournemouth. Johnstone scored the first try of the tour in the 18th minute and doubled his score with another try in the second half. South Africa won 31–6. Johnstone next played in the third game against a joint Pontypool/Newbridge team (scoring another try), before being moved into the centre position in an encounter with Llanelli. The very next game Johnstone was back in his favoured wing position and was back on the scoresheet with a try in a victory over the North-Western Counties. After being rested for the Glasgow/Edinburgh match, Johnstone played in two games back to back, wins over North-Eastern Counties and Cambridge University. Johnstone missed the encounter against London Counties, the only South African loss of the tour, before scoring two tries in the eleventh game of the tour, against Oxford University.

On 24 November 1951, Johnstone was awarded his first international cap when he was selected to face Scotland at Murrayfield. Scotland were beaten heavily, and although South Africa scored nine tries, none came from Johnstone or from the South Africans other wing Buks Marais. His second cap came two weeks later when he was chosen for the match against Ireland. The South Africans won 17–5, but again Johnstone was unable to secure his first international points. The game after Ireland, was a rough-and-tumble match against Munster; As a result of this 'rough and tumble', Johnstone earned the nickname 'The Mauler of Munster". Johnstone was one of only six players from the Ireland encounter to be selected for the match, which was played in muddy conditions. Johnstone was criticised for some poor defensive work, with his tackling sometimes high and ineffective, but he started the scoring with a try late in the first half. The game ended 11–6 to South Africa.

Johnstone was rested after the Munster match, playing in only two games from the next five; both internationals, against Wales and England. The Wales game was the most highly anticipated of the tour, with the match being hailed as the 'game of the century' and as 'for the rugby championship of the world'. The match was a tense affair, with little action for the backs from either team. The game ended 6–3 to South Africa, and although Johnstone again failed to score at international level, he did make an important defensive contribution when he threw himself on the ball to prevent Wales' Ken Jones from scoring. On 5 January 1952, Johnstone played in the game against England. He came close to scoring on two occasions, but was unable to finish either. Even without his tries, England were beaten 8–3.

With the Home Nation internationals behind them, South Africa had five more matches before travelling to France. Johnstone played against Newport and Midland Counties, scoring a try in the former, before he was selected for the last game in Britain, an encounter with the Barbarians. On the day of the match, South Africa, through injuries, were without both fly-halves, Dennis Fry and Hannes Brewis. Johnstone was given the fly-half role despite having last played in that position over three years previously in an encounter between Natal and Transvaal. At half time, the Springboks were 3–0 down. Johnstone had not been poor at fly-half, but the play was not at its best. The South African's reacted by bringing Keevy in at fly half and putting Johnstone back out at his favoured right wing position. South Africa improved after the change, winning the game 17–3. Johnstone was given half of the kicking duties and scored a penalty, the last points of the match. Johnstone ended the British leg of the tour as he had started it, scoring the first and last points.

The tour then travelled to France to play a further four games, including an encounter with the France national team. Johnstone played in two, against South West France and the international. In the match against South West France, a 20–12 win, he scored a try and a conversion. In the encounter with France, Johnstone had an excellent start, scoring the first nine points, his first at international level. He scored his first, a penalty goal after 25 minutes, this was followed by a try after a break by Stephen Fry after 32, finished with a second try eight minutes into the second half. Johnstone finished the match by converting a van Wyk try. South Africa finished the tour by beating France 25–3. On their return to South Africa, Johnstone received a letter from 'Danie' Craven, the tour leader and coach, stating that "You were the most improved player in the team".

=== 1956 tour to Australia and New Zealand ===
Two major tours came to South Africa before Johnstone represented South Africa again. He failed to play in the four Tests against the 1953 touring Australians and the four Test matches played against the 1955 touring British Lions due to the fact that he was at that time studying law in Oxford. During his three years at Oxford, he was awarded a Blue each year; and in 1954–55 he was captain of Oxford University RFC. In 1956 the Springboks undertook a tour of Australia and New Zealand, and Johnstone was selected in the touring party. As well as the club and representative games, South Africa played six Tests, two against Australia and four against the New Zealand 'All Blacks'.

Johnstone played in the first Test against Australia, in his favoured position of right wing; South Africa won 9–0. He missed the second and final Test against Australia, but was back in the squad for the first Test against New Zealand on 14 July. South Africa were beaten 6–10, it was Johnstone's first loss at international level. Despite the loss, Johnstone was back for the second Test against the All Blacks, this time a win for South Africa. Johnstone was absent from the third New Zealand Test, in which the Springboks lost 17–10, and he was brought back for the final Test. South Africa lost the game, and the series against New Zealand, and Johnstone never represented South Africa at international level again.

== Bibliography ==
- Billot, John (1974). Springboks in Wales. Ferndale: Ron Jones Publications.
- Griffiths, John (1987). The Phoenix Book of International Rugby Records. London: Phoenix House. ISBN 0-460-07003-7.
- Parker, A. C. (1970). The Springboks, 1891–1970. London: Cassell & Company Ltd. ISBN 0-304-93591-3.
- Stent, R. K. (1952). The Fourth Springboks 1951–1952. London: Longmans, Green and Co.
