= Villager Football Club =

South African rugby union club, based in Cape Town

(South Africa) Villager Football Club
- Full name: Villager Football Club
- Union: Western Province RFU
- Nickname: The Dirty Whites
- Founded: 1876; 150 years ago
- Location: Claremont, Cape Town, South Africa
- Ground: Brookside
- President: TBC
- Director of Rugby: Warren Edwards
- Coach(es): Charl Jacobs, Gareth Rowe, Morgan Newman, Andy Coetzee
- Captain: TBC
- League: Super League A - Western Province Club Rugby
- 10

Official website
- villagerfc.co.za

Villager Football Club was established on 2 June 1876 and claims to be the second oldest rugby club in Cape Town, South Africa. Villager FC were scheduled to play against Stellenbosch Rugby Football Club in the first official match at Newlands Stadium after it opened on 31 May 1890. Many notable South African rugby players began their careers at the club, including Paddy Carolin, vice-captain on the 1906 Springbok tour to Europe, and former 800m track world record holder Marcello Fiasconaro.

== Name ==
The club's name derives from the number of villages that spread west from Cape Town towards Simonstown during the colonial period, which later became suburbs of the city. Rugby's rules of football were only adopted by Villagers in 1879, who played according to Winchester's rules until then.

== Notable members ==
Villagers have produced the second most Springboks (58) of all South African rugby clubs, second only to Stellenbosch (Maties). The first Villager to represent South Africa was H.H Castens. Other prominent Villager Springboks include John Gainsford ( 33 tests) who coached Villager's under-20 teams in 1968, and served as President of Villager's from 2006-2010, Dave Stewart, HO de Villiers (14 ), Morné du Plessis (22), and Joel Stransky (22). Villager Nick Mallet not only played in 2 tests but also coached the national sides of South Africa and Italy. In addition Villager FC produced 175 Western Province players.

Other prominent players include:

- Fairy Heatlie - Springbok (1891-1903); 5th Springbok captain (1896); caused Springboks to wear green jerseys; represented Argentina (1910)
- Doug Hopwood - first modern No. 8
- William Henry Milton - represented England (1874–75); South African cricketer (1988–92); Administrator of Southern Rhodesia (1901–14)
- Frank Mellish - represented England (1920–21; Springbok (1921–24); manager (1951 tour to Britain & France)
- Stephen Fry - Springbok (1951–55) & captain (1955)
- Paul Johnstone - Springbok (1951–56); captain, Oxford RFC (1954)
- Christian Stewart - represented Canada (1991–95) & South Africa (1998)
- Percy Montgomery - Springbok (1997-2008); 3rd most caps as Springbok (102)
- Nick Easter - represented England (2007–15); 54 caps including 3 World Cups

== Villager School Sevens ==
In 1969, John Gainsford and Dave Stewart founded Villager School Sevens. Their aim was to give schoolboys, playing their last game in their school jerseys, a stimulating outing that encourages those who are not going to university, to join rugby clubs and continue in the true spirit of rugby. The tournament still runs every year in September.

== Club honours ==
Since 1925 Villager FC have won either the Grand Challenge Cup or Western Province Super League A title 13 times.

The following refers to competitions that the club won between 1925 and 2001:

Competition	Wins	Year
Super League A	1	2000
Grand Challenge Cup	10	1997, 1981, 1979 (shared), 1973, 1958, 1953, 1935, 1934, 1931 (shared), 1925
Lion Shield	1	1989
Town Challenge Cup	9	1975, 1972, 1968, 1948, 1938, 1935, 1931, 1926, 1925
Ohlssons Shield	2	1981, 1979
WP Competition	3	1938, 1937, 1926
Super League B	1	2014

In 2017 the club was promoted to the Super League A. Struggling in the A league the club got demoted in 2015 and after a rebuilding process has been promoted once again to Super League A in 2017.

== See also ==
- Villager FC players
