= Frank Mellish =

England & South Africa international rugby union player

- Born: Frank Whitmore Mellish; 26 April 1897 Cape Town, South Africa
- Died: 21 August 1965 (aged 68) Groote Schuur Hospital, Cape Town, South Africa
- School: Wynberg Boys' High School, Rondebosch Boys' High School, South African College School

Rugby union career
- Position(s): Flanker, Lock
Amateur team(s)
| Years | Team | Apps | (Points) |
| 1914–19 | Cape Town Highlanders | | |
| – | Villagers | | |
Senior career
| Years | Team | Apps | (Points) |
| 1919–20 | Blackheath F.C. | | |
| – | Barbarian F.C. | 2 | |
Provincial / State sides
| Years | Team | Apps | (Points) |
- Western Province
International career
| Years | Team | Apps | (Points) |
| 1920–21 | England | 6 | |
| 1921–24 | South Africa | 6 | |

Frank Whitmore Mellish, MC (26 April 1897 – 21 August 1965) was a rugby union footballer who played internationally for England and South Africa. After his rugby career, he served as a selector for the South African team and as the manager of the 1951 Springbok tour of the British Isles and France.

Mellish was born in Rondebosch, Cape Town, Cape Colony where he attended Wynberg Boys' High School, Rondebosch Boys' High School, and SACS. During World War I, he served in South-West Africa as a gunner with the Cape Town Highlanders in the South African Heavy Artillery from 1914 to 1915. On 15 May 1915 he sailed on the SS City of Athens to Europe where he received the Military Cross for action at Ypres in 1916. He undertook officer training in England, followed by a stint at the Royal Artillery Cadet School before his promotion to 2nd Lieutenant (and later acting Lieutenant). He then served on the Western Front with the South African Heavy Artillery where he was wounded in the left leg in April 1918. He relinquished his commission on 1 June 1919.

After the War he played for Blackheath and was elected a Barbarian in the 1919–20 season. His test début for England came on 17 January 1920, against Wales, playing in the position of Flanker. He represented England on five more occasions, against France, Ireland and Scotland (1920), and Wales and Ireland (1921). He was then chosen to represent South Africa in the first Springbok tour of New Zealand in 1921.

Following his rugby career he worked as a business executive with United Tobacco Company Ltd and as a flower farmer. However, on the outbreak of World War II, he served as a colonel in the South African Armoured Division. Following the war he returned to rugby where he represented South Africa on the Rugby Football Union from 1945 to 1946. He took over as the convener of the national selectors after Bill Schreiner and as the manager of the 1951 Springbok tour of the British Isles and France. Danie Craven rated him the best Springbok manager of all time.

His daughter, Margaret, married Major Sir Wilfred Robinson, 3rd Bt. in 1946. Mellish died on 21 August 1965 and his ashes were scattered at Newlands Stadium.
