= Ernst Dinkelmann =

South African rugby union player

- Born: Ernst Erich Dinkelmann; 14 May 1927 Ermelo, South Africa
- Died: 22 October 2010 (aged 83) Nelspruit, South Africa
- Height: 1.92 m (6 ft 4 in)
- Weight: 96 kg (15 st 2 lb)
- School: Ermelo High School
- University: University of Pretoria
- Occupation: Medical practitioner

Rugby union career
- Position: Lock
Amateur team(s)
Years	Team	Apps	(Points)
- Ermelo
–	University of Pretoria		
Provincial / State sides
Years	Team	Apps	(Points)
	Northern Transvaal	49	
International career
Years	Team	Apps	(Points)
1951–53	South Africa	6	(6)

Ernst Erich Dinkelmann (14 May 1927 – 22 October 2010) was a South African rugby union player, most often playing as a lock. Dinkelmann played club rugby for Ermelo and provincial rugby for Northern Transvaal. He won six caps for the South African national team (the Springboks) and was part of the 1951–52 South Africa rugby tour of Great Britain, Ireland and France which lost only once in 31 matches, winning all five international Tests.

== Personal history ==
Dinkelmann was born in Ermelo, South Africa in 1927. He was schooled at Ermelo High School before matriculating to the University of Pretoria. He was a medical practitioner by profession. Dinkelmann was married to Lucy and they had a daughter, five sons and thirteen grandchildren. He died of a stroke in Nelspruit in 2010.

== Rugby career ==
Dinkelmann played rugby from a young age, and he represented his local town team of Ermelo while still a schoolboy, but as a fly-half. He later moved into the scrum, and was selected to represent provincial team Northern Transvaal. In his time with Northern Transvaal he played 49 matches and was captain on five occasions.

In 1951 Dinkelmann was selected for the fourth South African tour of Great Britain. Dinkelmann was one of the more regular members of the squad, playing in 19 games of the tour and scoring nine points through three tries. Although a regular presence in the team, South African sports journalist R.K. Stent stated that Dinkelmann's form fluctuated throughout the tour. Dinkelmann played in the first game of the tour against a South East Counties combined team, and shared half of the first 12 games of the tour with the other three South African locks Dannhauser, Pickard and Barnard.

On 24 November 1951, Dinkelmann won his first international cap, when he was selected to face Scotland. The match was a one-sided affair with South Africa in complete control; every member of the pack, apart from Stephen Fry finishing on the score sheet. Dinkelmann scored a single try, his first international points, in a 44–0 win. Rested for the next game, against North of Scotland, Dinkelmann was back in the team for a win over Ulster before facing Ireland at Lansdowne Road. After a slow start, the South Africans dominated to win 17–5.

As with the Scotland game, Dinkelmann was rested for the following game after the Irish match. He was then re-selected for an encounter with Swansea the warm up game before facing Wales. Although South Africa were victorious over Swansea, the management were unhappy with the line-out play in both that match and the game against Ireland. One change was made for the encounter with Wales, Dinkelmann was dropped to bring in Barnard, a specialist in the line. South Africa won by a narrow 6–3 scoreline. Despite being dropped for the Welsh game, Dinkelmann was a near constant presence in the team after that match, playing in nine of the eleven remaining fixtures. This included the wins over England, the Barbarians and the final fixture in Paris to France. The 25–3 win over the French, also saw Dinkelmann score his second international try, barging over the line on the 54th minute.

On his return to South Africa, Dinkelmann played in two more internationals, the first two fixtures against Australia on the Wallabies 1953 tour. The first match, held at Johannesburg, saw the Springboks win by a 25–3 scoreline, but the very next game saw Australia rally to win 14–18 and level the series. This was South Africa's first loss in 15 years, and was attributed to the team trying to run with the ball in an attempt to play to the crowd. With two games left to win the series, the South African selectors reacted by making six changes. Dinkelmann was one of those dropped and never represented his country again.

== Bibliography ==
- Billot, John (1974). Springboks in Wales. Ferndale: Ron Jones Publications.
- Griffiths, John (1987). The Phoenix Book of International Rugby Records. London: Phoenix House. ISBN 0-460-07003-7.
- Parker, A.C. (1970). The Springboks, 1891–1970. London: Cassell & Company Ltd. ISBN 0-304-93591-3.
- Stent, R.K. (1952). The Fourth Springboks 1951–1952. London: Longmans, Green and Co.
