= Paddy Carolin =

South African rugby union player (1881–1967)

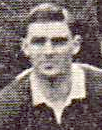
- 'Paddy' Carolin in 1906.
- Born: Harold William Carolin; 10 April 1881 Alicedale, Cape Colony
- Died: 15 March 1967 (aged 85)
- Height: 1.78 m (5 ft 10 in)
- Weight: 74.4 kg (164 lb)

Rugby union career
- Position(s): Centre; Fly-half
Amateur team(s)
Years	Team	Apps	(Points)
- Villagers RFC
Provincial / State sides
Years	Team	Apps	(Points)
- Western Province
International career
Years	Team	Apps	(Points)
1903–1906	South Africa	3	
- Correct as of 15 October 2007

Harold "Paddy" Carolin (10 April 1881 – 15 March 1967) was a rugby union player who represented South Africa and is credited with conceiving both the 3-4-1 scrum formation and helping choose the name 'Springboks' for the South African national side. Carolin was the second player ever to serve as captain abroad, following Paul Roos.

Carolin was born on 10 April 1881 in Alicedale in the Eastern Cape and attended Diocesan College in Cape Town. At school he won the award for best all-round sportsman for four years consecutive years, and was captain of both the rugby and cricket teams.

Carolin's first club was Villager Football Club, a Cape Town side.

In 1903 Carolin is selected at centre alongside Japie Krige for the 3rd test against the touring British side at Newlands on 12 September 1903.

He is captain of Villagers when he is chosen as vice-captain for the 1906-07 Springbok tour of Great Britain, Ireland, and France. Roos, Carolin, and team manager J C Carden chose the name 'Springboks' while on tour, prompted by the emblem that the side had worn on the left breast for the first time since the decision to do so had been taken in 1903.

In the test against Scotland in Glasgow on 17 November 1906 Carolin became the second player to captain South Africa abroad when Paul Roos had to withdraw from the team.

Carolin is often credited with inventing the 3-4-1 scrum formation in 1906, although he himself thought that fellow Villager Fairy Heatlie had first applied the formation in 1901. Heatlie and Carolin had both attended Diocesan College, although not at the same time. Danie Craven in turn pointed to 'Oubaas Mark' Markotter as the coach who had popularised and adapted the formation. The 1906 Springboks became "the first national team to utilize the 3-4-1 formation".

In all Carolin played in 3 test matches and 15 tour matches for the Springboks. His last test was on 24 November against Ireland at the Balmoral Showgrounds in Belfast, which South Africa won 15–12.

Carolin also played 9 first-class cricket matches for Western Province between 1902 and 1908. As a right-hand batter he scored 354 runs in 16 innings, and as a right-arm fast-medium bowler he took 30 wickets.

Carolin moved to Moorreesburg to practice law and subsequently became involved in two local sports clubs. With the help of his law partner, Fred Luyt (Springbok, 1910–12), he helped establish Moorreesburg's rugby club (est. 1889) as a force in Boland rugby. He coached the local team, which at one time included future Springbok Chris Koch (Springbok, 1949–60), who Carolin moved from wing to prop. In the process Carolin created "one of the very best ball players...amongst all of the world's international tight fives". With a Dr J P du Toit Carolin co-founded the Moorreesburg golf club in August 1912.

Carolin died in 1967.

Danie Craven described Carolin as an "outstanding player, captain, and powerful personality".

== See also ==
- 1906–07 South Africa rugby union tour
- Scrum (rugby union)
- The Springboks' Waltz

Sporting positions
Preceded by Jackie Powell	Springbok Captain; 1906	Succeeded by Paul Roos
