= Willem Barnard =

South African rugby union player

- Full name: Willem Hendrik Minnaar Barnard
- Born: 7 August 1923 Upington, South Africa
- Died: 14 June 2012 (aged 88) Upington, South Africa
- Height: 1.92 m (6 ft 4 in)
- Weight: 99.8 kg (220 lb)

Rugby union career
- Position: Lock
Provincial / State sides
Years	Team	Apps	(Points)
- Northern Transvaal
- Griqualand West
International career
Years	Team	Apps	(Points)
1949	South Africa	2	(0)

Willem Hendrik Minnaar Barnard (7 August 1923 – 14 June 2012) was a South African international rugby union player.

Born in Upington, Barnard was educated at Hoërskool Upington and Stellenbosch University.

Barnard started his professional career as a school teacher and represented Northern Transvaal while based at a technical college in Pretoria, from where he was first called up by the Springboks. He made his Springboks debut in the last of four home Test matches against the All Blacks in 1949, playing as a lock forward in place of Felix du Plessis. At the death of his father, Barnard returned to Upington to take over the family's cartage contracting company and began representing Griqualand West. He subsequently gained a place on the Springboks squad for their 1951–52 tour of Europe, where he featured in a total of 13 matches, with his only capped appearance coming against Wales in Cardiff.

== See also ==
- List of South Africa national rugby union players
