= Hannes Brewis =

South African rugby union player

- Born: Johannes Daniel Brewis; 15 June 1920 Oudtshoorn, South Africa
- Died: 9 September 2007 (aged 87) Pretoria, South Africa
- Height: 1.76 m (5 ft 9 in)
- Weight: 73 kg (11 st 7 lb; 161 lb)
- School: Oudtshoorn Boys' High; Langenhoven Commercial
- Occupation: Police officer

Rugby union career
- Position: Fly-half
Amateur team(s)
Years	Team	Apps	(Points)
- Police RFC
Provincial / State sides
Years	Team	Apps	(Points)
1946–53	Northern Transvaal		
International career
Years	Team	Apps	(Points)
1949–53	South Africa	10	(18)

Johannes Daniel "Hannes" Brewis (15 June 1920 – 9 September 2007) was a South African rugby union player. He was capped for South Africa ten times, and was selected to play for the Springboks on the 1951–52 South Africa rugby tour of Great Britain, Ireland and France; playing in all five international games of that tour. The touring team of 1951/52 is seen as one of the greatest South African teams, winning 30 of the 31 matches, including all five internationals. Brewis represented Northern Transvaal at regional level and is recognised as one of the great South African rugby players of the 1940s and early 1950s.

== Personal history ==
Brewis was born in Oudtshoorn, South Africa in 1920. He was educated at Oudtshoorn Boys' High and Langenhoven Commercial before moving to Pretoria. He became a police officer, and by the 1960s was a police warrant officer in Pretoria. On 28 September 1946 he married Priscilla Wilcocks of Bloemfontein with whom he had two daughters. He died in Pretoria in 2007.

== Rugby career ==
Brewis first came to note as a rugby player in the events of the 28 September 1946. On that day Northern Transvaal faced Western Province for the final of the Currie Cup, the same day Brewis was to marry Priscilla Wilcocks. Rather than miss the match, Brewis arranged to do both. In the match Brewis scored with two dropped goals, one from each foot. His last minute kick to the corner, with the score 8–9 in Western Province's favour, saw a defensive error allow Northern Transvaal to score an opportunistic winning try. This was the first time Northern Transvaal had won the Currie Cup. After the game, Brewis left the celebrations to attend his wedding, and initially the parson of the Dutch Reformed Church refused to marry the couple due to the late hour. The minister was persuaded to change his mind and Brewis and Priscilla were married that day.

In 1949 South Africa played its first international match since the end of the Second World War. The opposition was the touring New Zealand 'All Blacks'. All 15 players of the South Africa team were uncapped, and Brewis was selected at fly-half partnered with scrum-half Ballie Wahl. South Africa rugby legend, Hennie Muller, who made his name during the New Zealand tour, stated that the Springbok team was 'plainly worried' before the game and there were concerns as 'Hansie Brewis and Ballie Wahl, hardly new each other'. Despite the pre-match concerns the first Test of the series, played at Cape Town, saw South Africa beat New Zealand 15–11, all the South African points coming from penalties from Okey Geffin. Brewis was reselected for the second Test against the All Blacks, but his half back partner was switched from Wahl to Fonnie du Toit. Brewis and du Toit would play together for the next eight internationals, a South African half back record. The second Test, played at Johannesburg, saw Brewis score his first international points, with a dropped goal and a try in a 12–6 victory. The final two Tests of the tour both ended in South African victories, a whitewash for New Zealand. Brewis played in both, and in the fourth Test was on the scoreboard again with another dropped goal. The same match also saw du Toit score his first international score with a try.

"J. D. (Hannes) Brewis was the rugby brains of the party and is now established as the best strategist the game has known in South Africa since Bennie Osler".

— South African sports journalist R.K. Stent describing Brewis in his 1952 book The Fourth Springboks

In 1951, South Africa undertook their Fourth Tour of Great Britain, taking in matches against the four Home Nation teams and later, France. Brewis was selected for the tour, the second fly half selected was Dennis Fry, younger brother of fellow tourist and future South Africa captain Stephen Fry. Brewis played 14 matches of the 31 match tour, and initially was rotated with Fry for the early games against club and county teams. Although on a rota system, when the international games came around, Brewis and du Toit were always first choice selections. Brewis scored in the first three internationals, all South Africa wins, with dropped goals against Scotland, Ireland and Wales. In both the Ireland and Wales matches Brewis had scored his dropped goals after an earlier miss. In the Wales game his score was vital, as the South Africans won by a narrow 6–3 margin. The final Home Nations match, against England on 5 January 1952, saw Brewis play his final game on British soil. The South Africans beat England 8–3 to secure a Grand Slam of wins, but Brewis picked up an injury which ruled him out of the next four games. By the time Brewis was reselected the tour had moved onto France, where he played in two of the last four games. He faced a combined South-Western France team on 7 February, and then lined up against France in the final match of the tour. The Springboks won 25–3. Brewis finished the tour as the team's seventh highest scorer with 27 points, five tries and four dropped goals.

On his return to South Africa, Brewis was selected for one last international, the first Test of the 1953 touring Australia team. Played at Johannesburg, Brewis came into the squad partnered at centre with Hansie Oelofse. South Africa won 25–3. This was Brewis' final international, he had played in ten games, scored 18 points and never appeared on a losing side.

== Bibliography ==
- Billot, John (1974). Springboks in Wales. Ferndale: Ron Jones Publications.
- Griffiths, John (1987). The Phoenix Book of International Rugby Records. London: Phoenix House. ISBN 0-460-07003-7.
- Parker, A.C. (1970). The Springboks, 1891–1970. London: Cassell & Company Ltd. ISBN 0-304-93591-3.
- Stent, R.K. (1952). The Fourth Springboks 1951–1952. London: Longmans, Green and Co.
