= Ballie Wahl =

South African rugby union player

- Born: Johannes Joubert Wahl; 10 July 1920 Paarl, South Africa
- Died: 25 June 1978 (aged 57) Paarl, South Africa
- School: Paul Roos Gymnasium, Stellenbosch
- University: Stellenbosch University
- Occupation: Human Relations Manager

Rugby union career
- Position: Scrum-Half (rugby union)
Provincial / State sides
Years	Team	Apps	(Points)
1941-1949	Western Province (rugby team)	38	
-	Paarl RFC		
International career
Years	Team	Apps	(Points)
1949	Springboks	1	

Johannes Joubert (Ballie) Wahl (10 July 1920 – 25 June 1978) was a scrum-half rugby union player for South Africa's Springboks.

== Upbringing ==
Wahl was born on 10 July 1920 in Paarl, South Africa. He was the son of Francois Constant Wahl and Cecilia Elizabeth Joubert. He went to school at Paul Roos Gymnasium.

== Work life ==
After his studies at Stellenbosch University he started in 1944 in the personnel department at KWV South Africa (Pty) LTD in Paarl. In 1962 became the Human relation Manager.

== Rugby performance ==
He played scrumhalf. He represented Western Province (rugby team) in the local Currie Cup. For Western Province he played 38 games. He was chosen to represent South Africa against The All blacks in 1949. He played in the first test on 16 July 1949 at Newlands Stadium, under captain Felix du Plessis and Coach Danie Craven

== Personal life ==
He married Susanna Catharina Aletta Truter. They had three children. He died in Paarl on 25 June 1978.
