= Felix du Plessis =

South African rugby union player

- Born: Felix du Plessis; 24 November 1919 Steynsburg, South Africa
- Died: 1 May 1978 (aged 58) Stilfontein
- Notable relative: Morné du Plessis (son)

Rugby union career
- Position: Lock
Amateur team(s)
Years	Team	Apps	(Points)
- Wanderers, Johannesburg
–	Old Greys, Bloemfontein		
Provincial / State sides
Years	Team	Apps	(Points)
- Northern Transvaal
-	Transvaal		
International career
Years	Team	Apps	(Points)
1949	South Africa	3	

Felix du Plessis (24 November 1919 – 1 May 1978) was a South African rugby union footballer and captain of the South Africa (Springbok) team that in 1949 beat the All Blacks thrice in succession, a feat that was not repeated by a South African side until 2009. Du Plessis's son, Morné, also captained the Springboks, the only father-son duo to have done so.

== Early life and career ==
Du Plessis was born on 24 November 1919 in Steynsburg, in the Eastern Cape. He was the nephew of Nick du Plessis, a Springbok who toured to New Zealand in 1921 and gained 5 caps over a three-year career.

As a 19-year-old Felix Du Plessis was selected for the first Northern Transvaal team ever, when that union was formed in 1938. His teammate and captain was Danie Craven. He enlisted voluntarily during World War II.

== International career ==
Felix made his debut on 16 July 1949 for South Africa as a lock in the first test match at Newlands Stadium, Cape Town against the touring All Blacks, led by Fred Allen. He was the first ever Wanderers player to become Springbok captain. Supported by vice-captain Cecil Moss, Du Plessis' team – which included Springbok greats Tjol Lategan, Hannes Brewis, Okey Geffin, and Hennie Muller – swept the series 3 – 0. Six weeks after the last test, Morné was born.

Despite his three successive test victories as captain, Du Plessis was left out of the team that faced the All Blacks in the 4th test at Port Elizabeth. He was replaced by Basil Kenyon, possibly because the player-coach's Border team had emerged unbeaten from two encounters with the New Zealanders, with a 9–0 win and a 6–6 draw. Unlike Du Plessis, Kenyon would only receive this one cap.

=== International caps ===
No.	Opposition	Result (SA 1st)	Position	Tries	Date	Venue
1.	New Zealand	15–11	Lock		16 July 1949	Newlands Stadium, Cape Town
2.	New Zealand	12–6	Lock		13 August 1949	Ellis Park Stadium, Johannesburg
3.	New Zealand	9–3	Lock		3 September 1949	Kingsmead, Durban

== Personal life ==
Du Plessis married Pat Smethurst, who in 1954 captained the South African women's hockey team. Their son Morné is the only Springbok captain born to parents who both captained national sports sides. The Du Plessis couple supported the more liberal opposition United Party instead of the National Party, which had come to power in 1948 and would enforce apartheid for the next 42 years.

Felix worked as a representative for South African Breweries, then relocated to Vereeniging to manage Mittal Steel Company's sport and recreation department. He moved to Stilfontein, where he opened a liquor store, one of the first shops in town. Morné recalls his father as a gentle and retiring person, who only started watching his son play rugby once he was at Stellenbosch. Du Plessis died at Stilfontein in 1978 at the age of 58, having played only in the three tests against New Zealand.

== See also ==
- List of South Africa national rugby union players – Springbok no. 275
- Morné du Plessis
- 1949 New Zealand rugby union tour of South Africa

Sporting positions
Preceded by Danie Craven	Springbok Captain; 1949	Succeeded by Basil Kenyon
