= List of South Africa national rugby union team captains =

Every player to captain the South Africa national rugby union team (the Springboks) in a test match is listed here. Captains are listed in chronological order of their first match as captain.

H.H. Castens captained South Africa on 30 July 1891 in their first ever test against the touring British Isles team at Crusaders Cricket Ground in Port Elizabeth. John Smit holds the South Africa record as the most capped captain in international rugby history.

As of 14 July 2026

No.	Player	Initials	Date of first test	Date of first test as captain	Tests played	Tests played as captain
1	Herbert Castens	HH	30 July 1891	30 July 1891	1	1
2	Bob Snedden	RCD	29 August 1891	29 August 1891	1	1
3	Alf Richards	AR	30 July 1891	5 September 1891	1	1
4	Ferdie Aston	F	30 July 1896	30 July 1896	4	3
5	Fairy Heatlie	BH	9 August 1896	5 September 1896	6	2
6	Alex Frew	A	29 August 1903	29 August 1903	1	1
7	Jackie Powell	JM	19 August 1891	5 September 1903	4	1
8	Paddy Carolin	HW	12 September 1903	17 November 1906	3	1
9	Paul Roos	PJ	12 September 1903	24 November 1906	4	3
10	Dougie Morkel	DFT	24 November 1906	6 August 1910	9	2
11	Billy Millar	WA	8 December 1906	27 August 1910	6	5
12	Uncle Dobbin	FJ	29 August 1904	23 November 1913	9	1
13	Theo Pienaar^{[Note 1]}	TB	—	1921	—	—
14	Boy Morkel	WH	3 September 1910	13 August 1921	9	3
15	Pierre Albertyn	PK	16 August 1924	16 August 1924	4	4
16	Phil Mostert	PJ	13 August 1921	30 June 1928	14	4
17	Bennie Osler	BL	16 August 1924	5 December 1931	17	5
18	Phil Nel	PJ	30 June 1928	8 July 1933	16	8
19	Danie Craven	DH	5 December 1931	14 August 1937	16	4
20	Felix du Plessis	F	16 July 1949	16 July 1949	3	3
21	Basil Kenyon	BJ	17 September 1949	17 September 1949	1	1
22	Hennie Muller	HSV	16 July 1949	24 November 1951	13	9
23	Stephen Fry	SP	24 November 1951	6 August 1955	13	4
24	Basie Vivier	SS	26 May 1956	26 May 1956	5	5
25	Salty du Rand	JA	13 August 1949	14 July 1956	21	1
26	Johan Claassen	JT	6 August 1955	26 July 1958	28	9
27	Des van Jaarsveldt	DC	30 April 1960	30 April 1960	1	1
28	Roy Dryburgh	RG	20 August 1955	25 June 1960	8	2
29	Avril Malan	AS	25 June 1960	13 August 1960	16	10
30	Abie Malan	GF	16 August 1958	13 July 1963	18	4
31	Nelie Smith	CM	24 August 1963	25 July 1964	7	4
32	Dawie de Villiers	DJ	21 July 1962	31 July 1965	25	22
33	Tommy Bedford	TP	13 July 1963	16 August 1969	25	3
34	Hannes Marais	JFK	24 August 1963	12 June 1971	35	11
35	Piet Greyling	PJF	15 July 1967	30 June 1972	25	1
36	Morné du Plessis^{[Note 2]}	M	17 July 1971	21 June 1975	22	15
37	Theuns Stofberg	MTS	14 August 1976	18 October 1980	21	4
38	Wynand Claassen	W	30 May 1981	30 May 1981	7	7
39	Divan Serfontein	DJ	31 May 1980	20 October 1984	19	2
40	Naas Botha	HE	26 April 1980	10 May 1986	23	9
41	Jannie Breedt	JC	10 May 1986	26 August 1989	6	2
42	Francois Pienaar	JF	26 June 1993	26 June 1993	29	29
43	Tiaan Strauss	CP	17 October 1992	9 July 1994	15	1
44	Adriaan Richter	AH	17 October 1992	30 May 1995	10	1
45	Gary Teichmann	GH	2 September 1995	17 August 1996	42	36
46	Corné Krige	CP	19 June 1999	19 June 1999	39	18
47	Rassie Erasmus	J	5 July 1997	17 July 1999	36	1
48	Joost van der Westhuizen	JH	6 November 1993	7 August 1999	89	10
49	André Vos	AN	12 June 1999	10 October 1999	33	16
50	Bobby Skinstad	RB	29 November 1997	30 June 2001	42	12
51	John Smit	JW	10 June 2000	24 October 2003	111	83
52	Victor Matfield^{[Note 3]}	V	30 June 2001	23 June 2007	127	21
53	Johann Muller	GJ	10 June 2006	14 July 2007	22	1
54	Jean de Villiers	J	9 November 2002	9 June 2012	109	37
55	Schalk Burger	SWP	24 October 2003	25 July 2015	86	1
56	Fourie du Preez	PF	12 June 2004	3 October 2015	76	2
57	Adriaan Strauss	JA	19 July 2008	11 June 2016	57	3
58	Warren Whiteley	WR	6 September 2014	10 June 2017	23	2
59	Eben Etzebeth	E	9 June 2012	24 June 2017	131	12
60	Pieter-Steph du Toit	P	9 November 2013	2 June 2018	95	2
61	Siya Kolisi	SK	16 June 2013	9 June 2018	100	65
62	Duane Vermeulen	DJ	8 September 2012	27 July 2019	54	2
63	Schalk Brits	SB	21 June 2008	17 August 2019	15	2
64	Handré Pollard	H	28 June 2014	9 July 2022	65	1
65	Bongi Mbonambi	MT	25 June 2016	5 August 2023	73	2
66	Salmaan Moerat	S	2 July 2022	20 July 2024	10	3
67	Jessie Kriel	JA	18 July 2015	5 July 2025	77	1

== Notes ==
1 Theo Pienaar was selected as captain for the tour but never played. He is listed as captain number 13 by the South African Rugby Annual, the official yearbook of the South African Rugby Union.
2 Felix and Morné du Plessis are the only father-son combination who captained South Africa.
3 Victor Matfield returned as captain in June 2014 after Jean de Villiers was injured.
