= Buks Marais =

South African rugby union player

- Born: Franswa Pierre Marais; 13 December 1927 Worcester, South Africa
- Died: 12 December 1996 (aged 68) Durbanville, South Africa
- Height: 1.75 m (5 ft 9 in)
- Weight: 82 kg (12 st 13 lb)
- Occupation: Salesman

Rugby union career
- Position: Wing
Amateur team(s)
Years	Team	Apps	(Points)
- Paarl RFC
Provincial / State sides
Years	Team	Apps	(Points)
- Boland
International career
Years	Team	Apps	(Points)
1949–53	South Africa	5	(10)

Franswa Pierre "Buks" Marais (13 December 1927 – 12 December 1996) was a South African rugby union wing. Buks played club rugby for Paarl and provincial rugby for Boland. Marais was capped seven time for the South African national team (springboks) and was a member of the 1951–52 South Africa rugby tour of Great Britain, Ireland and France.

== Personal career ==
Marais was born in Worcester, South Africa in 1927. He was educated at Paarl Training College, and was a farm implement salesman by profession. He was nicknamed "Buks", which roughly translates to 'short but powerful', though Marais was just under 5 feet 10 inches.

== Rugby career ==
=== Early career ===
Marais played rugby for Paarl RFC, from Paarl Training College. In 1948 he was selected for province team Boland, and the next year he attended the Springbok trials in Pretoria, ready for the 1949 touring New Zealand team. He failed to make much of an impression as he was not shortlisted after the initial Trials. Despite this, after impressing in the regional game at Wellington for Boland, he was brought into the first Test against the New Zealand 'All Blacks'. This was Marais' first cap for South Africa, as was the case for the rest of the team, this being the first South African international for nine years. South Africa won 15–11. Marais was reselected for the second Test, played at Johannesburg. The game ended in another Springboks victory, though Marais, and his opposite wing Cecil Moss both failed to score; as had happened in the first Test. Marais was replaced for the third and fourth Tests.

=== 1951 tour ===
In 1951 Marais was selected for the Fourth South African tour of Great Britain, which also took in matches in Ireland and France. Although one of the few tour members with international experience Marais was not seen as a first choice for the wing position. He played 14 games in total during the tour, but only one of the internationals. The team managers decided to place the four wing players on a rotation system, which saw Marais play in three of the first six matches. His first game of the tour was against a joint South West Counties team on 15 October, this was followed with his first score of the tour when he scored a try in the encounter with a joint Pontypool/Newbridge side the very next game.

Marais added to his tally when he scored another try in the win over North West Counties, but then picked up an injury that kept out of the next five matches. By the time he recovered there was just one game before the first international of the tour, another joint Welsh game, this time to Neath/Aberafon. Marais was selected, and proved himself fit with three tries in a 22–0 win. The next game was the First tour international, against Scotland at Murrayfield. Chum Ochse was the press favourite to take the wing role, but the management made the surprise choice of choosing Marais due to Ochse's poor defensive showings in prior matches. The Scotland game became a rout, with South Africa winning 44–0, though none of the nine South Africa tries were scored from either of the wings.

Marais failed to be chosen for any of the final four internationals, with Ochse being preferred. Marais continued to play in the club and regional games, scoring ten tries in total by the end of the tour. He also played in the encounter between South Africa and the Barbarians on 26 January 1952.

=== Later career ===
After his return to South Africa, Marais was still considered a part of the Springboks team. When the 1953 touring Australian team came to South Africa, Marais was chosen for the first Test. Played at Johannesburg, the game ended in a convincing 25–3 win for the Springboks, Marais scoring a try, a conversion and a penalty. The second Test saw the first South African loss in 15 years, believed to have been caused by a desire to 'play to the crowd', which saw the team switch from their structured kicking game, to running with the ball. Although Marais converted one of the tries, his team lost 14–18, and he was never selected to play international rugby again.

== Bibliography ==
- Billot, John (1974). Springboks in Wales. Ferndale: Ron Jones Publications.
- Griffiths, John (1987). The Phoenix Book of International Rugby Records. London: Phoenix House. ISBN 0-460-07003-7.
- Parker, A.C. (1970). The Springboks, 1891–1970. London: Cassell & Company Ltd. ISBN 0-304-93591-3.
- Stent, R.K. (1952). The Fourth Springboks 1951–1952. London: Longmans, Green and Co.
