= Cowboy Saunders =

South African rugby union player

- Born: Martin J. Saunders; 26 November 1928 Hobhouse, South Africa
- Died: 17 May 2006 (aged 77) Johannesburg, South Africa
- Height: 1.81 m (5 ft 11 in)
- Weight: 86 kg (13 st 8 lb)
- School: Elliot School
- University: Paarl Training College
- Occupation: Police detective

Rugby union career
- Position: Wing
Amateur team(s)
Years	Team	Apps	(Points)
- Paarl RFC
–	Hamiltons		
–	Villagers		
–	Pirates		
Provincial / State sides
Years	Team	Apps	(Points)
- Border
International career
Years	Team	Apps	(Points)
1951–52	South Africa	0	(0)

Martin "Cowboy" Saunders (26 November 1928 – 17 May 2006) was a South African rugby union wing. Saunders played club rugby for Paarl, Hamiltons, Villagers and Pirates and provincial rugby for Border. Although he was never capped for South Africa Saunders is considered a 'Springbok' as he represented his country on the 1951–52 South Africa rugby tour of Great Britain, Ireland and France. The touring team is seen as one of the greatest South African teams, winning 30 of the 31 matches, including all five internationals.

== Personal history ==
Saunders was born in Hobhouse, South Africa in 1928. He was educated at Elliot School and later Paarl Training College, and was a detective in the South African Police force rising to the rank of colonel. South African journalist R.K. Stent said that he was nicknamed Cowboy, due to his 'high. bucking running style. Saunders was married, to Estelle, they had three children.

== Rugby career ==
Saunders played for a number of club teams, playing for Hamiltons in East London, Villagers in Queenstown and Pirates in Uitenhage. At provincial level, he was selected for Border. In 1949, the New Zealand rugby team toured South Africa. Four Test matches were arranged between New Zealand and South Africa and Saunders was rumoured to have been selected for the final Test, though he never played. Despite not playing for South Africa, Saunders did face New Zealand, twice, as part of the Border team. Both under the captaincy of Basil Kenyon, Border won the first game 9–0, and drew the second 6–6.

Saunders was then selected for the fourth South African tour of Britain, which also took in matches in Ireland and France. The South African team was composed of four wing players and the tour managers rotated the wings each game. Saunders played in 14 of the tour games, scoring 33 points with 11 tries; he was the fifth highest scoring player of the tour. Despite being utilised for nearly half of the games of the tour, he only faced club and combined teams; he failed to play against any of the five international teams.

Saunders was selected for the very first game of the tour, facing a combined South-Eastern Counties team on 10 October 1951. The South Africans won the opener and the two games that followed, for which Saunders was rested, before facing two Welsh teams in succession, Cardiff and Llanelli. Both were victories, and Saunders scored his first points of the tour, a late try against Llanelli. There were seven games after the Llanelli match until the first international encounter with Scotland, Saunders played in four of them; wins over a joint Glasgow/Edinburgh, North Eastern Counties and Oxford University, and the only loss of the tour to London Counties. Saunders scored in two of the matches, a try against London Counties and two tries against Oxford. Although not chosen for any of the internationals, Saunders played in a further seven tour matches, scoring tries against the North of Scotland, a Combined Services team, Western Counties (2), South of Scotland and South West France (2).

After Saunders returned from the British tour he continued to play for Border. An international cap eluded him, but with Border he faced two more international teams. In 1953 he was part of the Border team to face and lose to the touring Australia team, but two years later he was on the wing when Border beat the 1955 British Lions.

== Bibliography ==
- Billot, John (1974). Springboks in Wales. Ferndale: Ron Jones Publications.
- Griffiths, John (1987). The Phoenix Book of International Rugby Records. London: Phoenix House. ISBN 0-460-07003-7.
- Parker, A.C. (1970). The Springboks, 1891–1970. London: Cassell & Company Ltd. ISBN 0-304-93591-3.
- Stent, R.K. (1952). The Fourth Springboks 1951–1952. London: Longmans, Green and Co.
