= Willem Delport =

South African rugby union player

- Full name: Willem Hendrik Delport
- Born: 5 November 1920 Kirkwood, South Africa
- Died: 14 October 1984 (aged 63) Pretoria, South Africa

Rugby union career
- Position: Hooker
International career
Years	Team	Apps	(Points)
1951–53	South Africa	9	(6)

Willem Hendrik Delport (5 November 1920 – 14 October 1984) was a South African international rugby union player.

Delport was educated at Kirkwood High School and Stellenbosch University, where he studied law.

An Eastern Province hooker, Delport won nine Springboks caps between 1951 and 1953. He was a member of the 1951–52 Springboks that toured Europe and completed the grand slam, appearing in all five Tests.

== See also ==
- List of South Africa national rugby union players
