= Basie Vivier =

South African rugby union player (1927–2009)

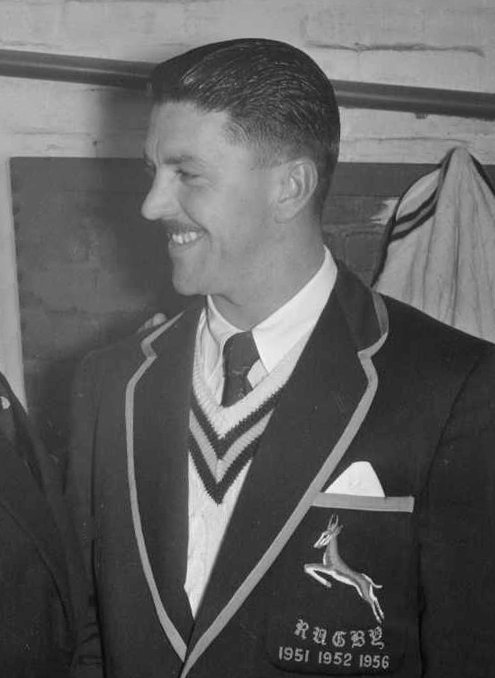
- Vivier in New Zealand in 1956
- Born: Stefanus Sebastian Vivier; 1 March 1927 Pietersburg, South Africa
- Died: 18 October 2009 (aged 82) Brandfort, South Africa
- Occupation(s): Police officer miner marketing consultant

Rugby union career
- Position(s): Centre; Fullback
Senior career
Years	Team	Apps	(Points)
1947–50	Northern Transvaal		
1950–1956	Orange Free State		
International career
Years	Team	Apps	(Points)
1951–57	South Africa	5	(11)

Stefanus Sebastian "Basie" Vivier (1 March 1927 – 18 October 2009) was a South African rugby union player. He was capped for South Africa five times in 1956, though he was first selected to play for the Springboks on the 1951–52 South Africa rugby tour of Great Britain, Ireland and France; but was never selected for an international match on that tour. The touring team of 1951/52 is seen as one of the greatest South African teams, winning 30 of the 31 matches, including all five internationals.

== Personal history ==
Vivier was born Stefanus Sebastian Viviers in 1927 in Pietersburg, Northern Transvaal to Stefanus Vivier. The family name was spelt "Viviers" until it was discovered that the 's' had been appended to his father's name by his school, and the family changed their surname when it was established in 1955 that the true surname was "Vivier". He was educated at Kenhardt and Nylstroom. A member of the South African Police in Pretoria, he later went mining in the new Orange Free State gold town of Welkom. After 1951 he became an insurance salesman before he was made marketing consultant for National Industries.

Vivier was known for his congeniality and sense of humour on tours. South African rugby journalist R. K. Stent, in his 1952 book The Fourth Springboks, described Vivier as the 'side's court jester' who possessed a fine tenor voice.

He married Eunice de Watt, with whom he had four children.

== Rugby career ==
Vivier played provincial rugby for Northern Transvaal from 1947 to 1950, before moving to the Free State where he played for Orange Free State. His 28 points scored in the 1950 match between Northern Transvaal and North Eastern Districts set a South African record, beating the 24 points scored by Gerry Brand 26 years earlier.

In 1951 he attended the Newlands' trials, set to determine the squad for the fourth Springboks tour of Britain. Vivier was selected as a utility back. He played 14 games on the tour, nine at centre, five at full-back and in the match against North of Scotland an injury to Johannes Oelofse saw Vivier switch from centre to scrum-half. Despite only playing 14 of the 31 matches, and not playing in any of the five international games, Viviers ended as the tour's second highest scorer with 58 points. His first match in the Springboks jersey was on 13 October 1952, in a win against a combined South-Western counties team. He followed this the very next match with his first points for South Africa, scoring a penalty as full-back in an encounter with a joint Pontypridd/Newbridge team in Wales. Throughout the tour when not playing, Vivier was often used as one of the touch judges.

On his return to South Africa, Vivier continued to turn out for Orange Free State, but was still unable to break into the international side. Two touring sides came to South Africa before Vivier won his first international cap, the 1952 Australian tour and the 1955 British Lions. Neither saw Vivier selected, therefore it was a surprise when Vivier was chosen to captain the Springboks on their 1956 tour of Australia and New Zealand. The season before Vivier had played the three opening games for Orange Free State, but had then been dropped for the next eight, he also had no international experience. Despite this, Vivier was then chosen for the 1956 tour ahead of in form fullback Jack van der Schyff. The first choice captains for the tour were Salty du Rand, captain of North Transvaal, and Jan Pickard, captain of Western Province; but the two men brawled with each other during the trials. This led the selectors to find an alternative choice, a player who would have the ability to unite the team; they chose Vivier.

The tour took in 29 matches, including two Tests against Australia and four against the New Zealand 'All Blacks'. The first Test of the tour was against Australia at Sydney on 26 May 1956. Vivier was selected at full-back, winning his first international cap, and scoring his first international points, with a penalty goal in a 9–0 victory. The second Test against Australia saw Vivier switch from full-back, Johnny Buchler taking that position, to half-back. South Africa won 9–0.

The first Test in New Zealand saw du Rand take the captaincy when Vivier was indisposed; South Africa lost 6–10. The second Test, played at Wellington, saw Vivier back in the team at full-back. The game was won by South Africa 8–3, with Vivier again on the score sheet converting one of the two tries. He continued in his position as full back for the final two Tests of the tour, both loses. Vivier scored in both Tests converting both South African tries in the third and Dryburgh's try in the fourth. The New Zealand defeat of South Africa in the Test series was the Springboks' first series defeat since 1896. He never represented South Africa again.

After retiring from playing, Vivier became a selector for Western Transvaal and then Northern Transvaal.

== Bibliography ==
- Billot, John (1974). Springboks in Wales. Ferndale: Ron Jones Publications.
- Griffiths, John (1987). The Phoenix Book of International Rugby Records. London: Phoenix House. ISBN 0-460-07003-7.
- Parker, A.C. (1970). The Springboks, 1891–1970. London: Cassell & Company Ltd. ISBN 0-304-93591-3.
- Stent, R.K. (1952). The Fourth Springboks 1951–1952. London: Longmans, Green and Co.

Sporting positions
Preceded by Stephen Fry	Springbok Captain; 1956	Succeeded by Salty du Rand
