= International Rugby Hall of Fame =

Sports award in New Zealand

The International Rugby Hall of Fame (IRHOF) was a hall of fame for rugby union. It was created in 1997 in New Zealand and is run as a charitable trust with an address at Chiswick in London. Most of the trustees are also inductees. IRHOF accepted new inductees every two years until 2007. Most inductees are former players, but others who have contributed to the game are eligible. In 2014 it was integrated into the IRB Hall of Fame, which then was renamed the World Rugby Hall of Fame.

== 1997 inductees ==
Inductee	Nation
Serge Blanco	France
Danie Craven	South Africa
Frik du Preez	South Africa
Gareth Edwards	Wales
Mark Ella	Australia
Mike Gibson	Ireland
Barry John	Wales
Willie John McBride	Ireland
Colin Meads	New Zealand
Cliff Morgan	Wales
George Nēpia	New Zealand
Tony O'Reilly	Ireland
Hugo Porta	Argentina
Jean-Pierre Rives	France
J. P. R. Williams	Wales

== 1999 inductees ==
Inductee	Nation
Gerald Davies	Wales
Morne du Plessis	South Africa
Nick Farr-Jones	Australia
Andy Irvine	Scotland
Carwyn James	Wales
Jack Kyle	Ireland
Brian Lochore	New Zealand
Philippe Sella	France
Wavell Wakefield	England
Wilson Whineray	New Zealand

== 2001 inductees ==
Inductee	Nation
Gordon Brown	Scotland
David Campese	Australia
Ken Catchpole	Australia
Don Clarke	New Zealand
Mervyn Davies	Wales
Sean Fitzpatrick	New Zealand
Michael Lynagh	Australia
Bill McLaren (commentator)	Scotland
Hennie Muller	South Africa
Jean Prat	France

== 2003 inductees ==
Inductee	Nation
Bill Beaumont	England
Gavin Hastings	Scotland
Tim Horan	Australia
Michael Jones	New Zealand
Ian Kirkpatrick	New Zealand
John Kirwan	New Zealand
Jo Maso	France
Syd Millar	Ireland

== 2005 inductees ==
Inductee	Nation
Fred Allen	New Zealand
Phil Bennett	Wales
André Boniface	France
Naas Botha	South Africa
John Eales	Australia
Grant Fox	New Zealand
Dave Gallaher	New Zealand
Martin Johnson	England
Ian McGeechan	Scotland
Gwyn Nicholls	Wales
Francois Pienaar	South Africa

== 2007 inductees ==
Inductee	Nation
Ieuan Evans	Wales
Danie Gerber	South Africa
Tom Kiernan	Ireland
Jason Leonard	England
Jonah Lomu	New Zealand
Terry McLean (journalist)	New Zealand
Graham Mourie	New Zealand
Bennie Osler	South Africa
Fergus Slattery	Ireland
Joost van der Westhuizen	South Africa

== Inductees per nation ==
Nation	Number of inductees
New Zealand	18
Wales	10
South Africa	9
Ireland	7
Australia	7
France	6
Scotland	5
England	4
Argentina	1

== See also ==
- World Rugby Hall of Fame – established in 2006 by World Rugby (previously known as the International Rugby Board)
