= Basie van Wyk =

South African rugby union player

- Full name: Christiaan Johannes van Wijk
- Born: 5 November 1923 Vryburg, South Africa
- Died: 29 August 2002 (aged 78) Warmbad, South Africa

Rugby union career
- Position: Flanker
International career
Years	Team	Apps	(Points)
1951–55	South Africa	10	(18)

Christiaan Johannes "Basie" van Wijk (5 November 1923 – 29 August 2002) was a South African rugby union international who was capped 10 times as a flanker for the Springboks in the 1950s.

Born in Vryburg, van Wijk played his provincial rugby for Transvaal. He debuted for South Africa on the 1951–52 Europe tour and scored four tries across the five Tests, all won by the Springboks. His career also included home Tests against the touring Australians in 1953. On the reciprocal trip to Australia in 1956, van Wijk broke his leg while training in Sydney ahead of his first tour match. He was a schoolteacher by profession.

== See also ==
- List of South Africa national rugby union players
