= Jackie Powell =

South African rugby union footballer and cricketer

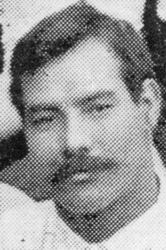
- Born: John Mercer Powell; 12 December 1871 Cape Town, South Africa
- Died: 19 December 1955 (aged 84)

Rugby union career
- Position(s): Inside centre Fly-half
Provincial / State sides
Years	Team	Apps	(Points)
- Griquas
International career
Years	Team	Apps	(Points)
1891 - 1903	South Africa	4	
- Correct as of 15 October 2007

John "Jackie" Powell (12 December 1871 – 19 December 1955) was a rugby union player who represented South Africa 4 times, once as captain. At 19 years 260 days, he is one of the youngest players to have represented South Africa.

Powell attended St. Andrew's College, Grahamstown in 1890. Alongside his rugby career, he also played 17 matches of first-class cricket for Griqualand West between the 1892–93 and 1913–14 seasons.

Sporting positions
Preceded by Alex Frew	Springbok Captain; 1903	Succeeded by Paddy Carolin
