= Hansie Oelofse =

South African rugby union player

- Full name: Johannes Stephanus Albertus Oelofse
- Born: 16 December 1926 Johannesburg, South Africa
- Died: 31 May 1978 (aged 51)
- Height: 1.71 m (5 ft 7 in)
- Weight: 72.6 kg (160 lb)

Rugby union career
- Position: Scrum–half
Provincial / State sides
Years	Team	Apps	(Points)
- Transvaal
International career
Years	Team	Apps	(Points)
1953	South Africa	4	(6)

Johannes Stephanus Albertus Oelofse (16 December 1926 – 31 May 1978), known as Hansie Oelofse, was a South African international rugby union player.

Oelofse was born in Johannesburg and educated at Parktown Boys' High School.

A scrum–half, Oelofse gained his maiden Springboks call up for their 1951–52 tour of Europe, to act as back up for Fonnie du Toit, but didn't get called upon until the final stage of the tour in France and made no capped appearances. He was the Springboks scrum–half for all four home internationals against the 1953 Wallabies, scoring two tries. His career was greatly impacted by persistent leg injuries.

== See also ==
- List of South Africa national rugby union players
