= Salty du Rand =

South African rugby union footballer

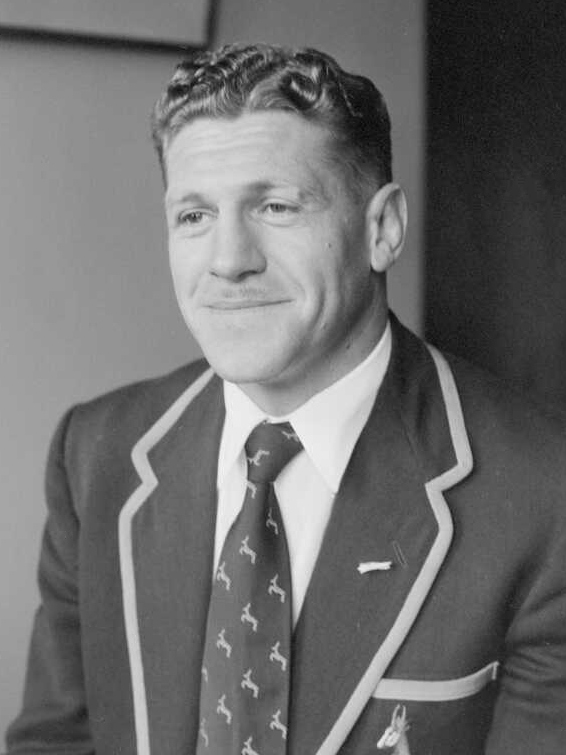
- du Rand in New Zealand in 1956
- Born: Jacobus Abraham du Rand; 16 January 1926 Hofmeyr, Union of South Africa
- Died: 27 February 1979 (aged 53) Pretoria, South Africa
- Height: 1.92 m (6 ft 4 in)
- Weight: 102 kg (225 lb)
- School: Cradock High School

Rugby union career
- Position(s): Flanker, Lock,
Amateur team(s)
| Years | Team | Apps | (Points) |
- Maties
- Pretoria RFC
Provincial / State sides
| Years | Team | Apps | (Points) |
| 1947–1948 | Western Province | | |
| 1949–1952 | Rhodesia | | |
| 1953–1956 | Northern Transvaal | | |
International career
| Years | Team | Apps | (Points) |
| 1949–1956 | South Africa | 21 | (12) |

Jacobus Abraham du Rand (better known as Salty du Rand) (16 January 1926 – 27 February 1979) was a former South African rugby union footballer. He played numerous times for South Africa, including on their 1951–52 Grand Slam tour of Europe, as well as captaining them once against the All Blacks.

== Playing career ==
He made his debut for the Springboks in 1949 in a Test match against the All Blacks, which was played at Ellis Park in Johannesburg. The game was won by South Africa, defeating the New Zealanders 12 to six. South Africa also won the subsequent contest in Durban, defeating the All Blacks again, nine points to three.

In 1951 he was capped three times for the Springboks, who went on a tour of Europe. The first Test he played in on tour was against Scotland at Murrayfield in late November, which the Springboks won 44 points to nil, in which he scored his first try in a Test. He then played in the 17–5 victory over Ireland at Lansdowne Road and the 6 to 3 win over Wales in Cardiff.

The tour continued into early 1952, and du Rand was capped in matches against England at Twickenham, which the Springboks won 8 to three, and then against France, where South Africa won 25 to three, and thus, completed a grand slam of Europe.

He was then chosen to play in a four match series against the Wallabies in 1953, scoring a try in the first Test at Ellis Park, which South Africa won 25 to three. He also scored in the following Test, and played in the two other games as well.

In 1955. the British Lions came to South Africa. Du Rand played in all four Tests. The following season he was capped twice against the Wallabies, both of which the Springboks won. The tour then continued to New Zealand, and du Rand captained South Africa against the All Blacks on July 14 at Carisbrook. He was capped another three times against the All Blacks, playing his last Test for South Africa on September 1 at Eden Park. He died in 1979.

== See also ==
- List of South Africa national rugby union players – Springbok no. 281

Sporting positions
| Preceded by Basie Vivier | Springbok Captain; 1956 | Succeeded by Johan Claassen |
