= Gerwyn Williams =

Wales international rugby union footballer & coach

- Born: Gerwyn Williams; 22 April 1924 Glyncorrwg, Neath Port Talbot, Wales
- Died: 10 February 2009 (aged 84) Clare, England
- School: Port Talbot Grammar
- University: Loughborough College
- Occupation: school teacher

Rugby union career
- Position: Fullback
Amateur team(s)
Years	Team	Apps	(Points)
- Taibach RFC
–	Devonport Services R.F.C.		
–	Royal Navy		
–	London Welsh RFC		
–	Llanelli RFC		
–	Middlesex		
–	Hampshire		
–	London Counties		
–	Barbarian F.C.		
International career
Years	Team	Apps	(Points)
- Welsh Secondary Schools
1950-1954	Wales	13	(0)
Coaching career
- Years: Team
- Cambridge University
- –: Blackheath F.C.
- –: London Counties

Gerwyn Williams (22 April 1924 – 10 February 2009) was a Welsh rugby union player, coach and author.

== Biography ==
Williams was born in Glyncorrwg, Glamorgan, the son of Ephraim and Catherin (Hopkins) Williams. He attended Port Talbot County School and Loughborough College after serving in the Royal Navy during World War II.

== Rugby career ==
Williams began playing rugby in grammar school, and won his first cap as a U-15 player with Wales against England. He continued at Loughborough, playing on the College XV. As a professional, Williams played fullback for Llanelli RFC and London Welsh, as well as on the Wales national rugby union team from 1950 to 1954. He won his first senior cap in the Triple Crown deciding match against Ireland in 1950. In 1952, Williams played on the Grand Slam winning team, and he was the fullback in the last Wales team to beat the New Zealand All Blacks.

== Post-rugby career ==
Williams was forced to retire from rugby following the dislocation of his shoulder in a five Nations match against England at Twickenham. In his post-rugby career, he became a school PE teacher in Harrow Grammar school, before moving to private education at Whitgift School in Croydon. Here he taught maths and PE and became the coach of Whitgift's first XV. In 1967 he developed the Whitgift school seven-aside team which won what was then called the Public Schools Sevens, now known as the Howden Rosslyn Park Schools Sevens. He coached both Cambridge University to victory in the Varsity match in 1968 and then at Blackheath. He went on to coach the outstanding London Welsh team of the 1970s. Williams was the author of four rugby union training manuals:

- Modern Rugby (1964);
- Schoolboy Rugby (1966);
- Tackle Rugger This Way (1968);
- Tackle Rugger (1975).

He died in Clare, Suffolk.
