= Basil Kenyon =

South African rugby union player

- Born: Basil John Kenyon; 19 May 1918 Umtata, Cape Province
- Died: 9 May 1996 (aged 77) Plettenberg Bay, Western Cape
- Height: 1.83 m (6 ft 0 in)
- Weight: 87 kg (192 lb)
- School: Umtata High School

Rugby union career
- Position: Flank
Provincial / State sides
Years	Team	Apps	(Points)
–	Border		
International career
Years	Team	Apps	(Points)
1949	South Africa	1	(0)

Basil John Kenyon (19 May 1918 – 9 May 1996) was a South African rugby union player.

== Biography ==
Kenyon was born in Umtata, and grew up in the Transkei. He joined the SA forces during the World War II in North Africa and Italy. On return to South Africa he moved to East London to join Border.

In 1949, Kenyon was selected to make his debut for the Springboks in the fourth and final test match against the All Blacks and was also named captain. He was the appointed captain of the Springbok team to tour Britain, Ireland and France in 1951. Kenyon played in five tour matches and in the match against Pontypool, he injured his eye so severely that it ended his tour and he never played rugby again. In his 5 tour matches he scored 13 points, which included 2 tries, 2 conversions and a penalty goal.

After his playing days, Kenyon started coaching and in 1958 he was the Springboks' coach in the Test series against France.

=== Test history ===
No.	Opponents	Results (SA 1st)	Position	Tries	Dates	Venue
1.	New Zealand	11–8	Flank (c)		17 Sep 1949	Crusaders Ground, Port Elizabeth

== See also ==
- List of South Africa national rugby union players – Springbok no. 286

Sporting positions
Preceded by Felix du Plessis	Springbok Captain; 1949	Succeeded by Hennie Muller
Preceded by (South Africa) Danie Craven	South Africa National Rugby Union Coach; 1958	Succeeded by (South Africa) Hennie Muller
