= Flappie Lochner =

South African rugby union player

- Born: George Philip Lochner; 11 January 1914 Vanrhynsdorp, South Africa
- Died: 30 January 1996 (aged 82) Somerset West, South Africa
- Height: 1.80 m (5 ft 11 in)
- Weight: 79.5 kg (175 lb)
- School: Hoërskool Dirkie Uys, Moorreesburg
- University: Stellenbosch University

Rugby union career
- Position: Centre
Amateur team(s)
Years	Team	Apps	(Points)
1931–34, 39	Maties		
1935	Cradock Rovers		
1936–38	Albanie		
1940–43	Wellington Rugby Football Club		
Provincial / State sides
Years	Team	Apps	(Points)
1935–38	Eastern Province		
1939	Western Province		
1940–43	Boland		
International career
Years	Team	Apps	(Points)
1937–38	South Africa	3	(3)
1937	South Africa (tour)	9	(24)

George Philip "Flappie" Lochner (11 January 1914 – 30 January 1996) was a South African rugby union player.

== Biography ==
Lochner was born in Vanrhynsdorp. He attended the Hoërskool Dirkie Uys in Moorreesburg, after which he studied at Stellenbosch University. After completing his studies, Lochner began teaching, first in Cradock and later at Kingswood College in Grahamstown. In 1935 he made his provincial debut for the Eastern Province.

Lochner was a member of the 1937 Springbok touring team to Australia and New Zealand and played his first test match for South Africa on 25 September 1937 against the All Blacks at Eden Park in Auckland. Lochner also played 9 tour matches and scored eight tries. In 1938 he played in two test matches against the touring team from the British Isles, scoring one try.

Lochner returned to Stellenbosch in 1939 to further his studies where he played for Western Province. In 1940 he became a lecturer at the Wellington Training College and played for Wellington Club and for Boland from 1940 to 1943. He later served as selector and manager of the Springbok team.

=== Test history ===
No.	Opponents	Results (SA 1st)	Position	Tries	Dates	Venue
1.	New Zealand	17–6	Centre		25 Sep 1937	Eden Park, Auckland
2.	(United Kingdom) British Isles	26–12	Centre		6 Aug 1938	Ellis Park, Johannesburg
3.	(United Kingdom) British Isles	19–3	Centre	1	3 Sep 1938	Crusaders Ground, Port Elizabeth

== See also ==
- List of South Africa national rugby union players – Springbok no. 249
