= Stephen Fry (rugby union) =

South African rugby union player (1924-2002)

- Fry before the England Match in 1952
- Born: Stephen Perry Fry; 14 July 1924 Somerset West, South Africa
- Died: 29 June 2002 (aged 77) Somerset West, South Africa
- Height: 1.88 m (6 ft 2 in)
- Weight: 90 kg (14 st 2 lb)
- University: University of Cape Town
- Occupation: Engineer

Rugby union career
- Position: Flanker
Amateur team(s)
Years	Team	Apps	(Points)
- Somerset West RFC
–	Villager Football Club		
Provincial / State sides
Years	Team	Apps	(Points)
- Western Province
International career
Years	Team	Apps	(Points)
1951–55	South Africa	13	(0)

Stephen Perry Fry (14 July 1924 – 29 June 2002) was a South African rugby union player, most often playing as a flanker. Fry played rugby for his home town of Somerset West and provincial rugby for Western Province. He won 13 caps for the South African national team (the Springboks), and captained the country in four matches against the British Lions.

== Personal history ==
Fry was born in Somerset West in South Africa in 1924. He was one of five brothers; one of whom was killed flying in the Battle of Britain. The others were, Dennis who also toured with the Springboks in 1951, Alec his twin, and Robert. Fry served South Africa during the Second World War, and on his return studied at the University of Cape Town, gaining a BSc in Engineering and qualified as an engineer. A keen sportsman, he is described as a first-class athlete and was a half-blue at the university.

Fry married Bettie, and they had two children, Juliet and Mark. He harboured ambitions to be a jazz pianist.

== Rugby career ==
Fry began playing rugby as a schoolboy, playing in an under-eleven side. As an adult he played for local club Somerset West RFC. Fry served in the South African 6th Armoured Division during the Second World War, and after the end of hostilities in 1945 he toured with the Armoured Division's rugby team. The team played in both Britain and France.

On his return to South Africa whilst at the University of Cape Town, he was chosen to represent the Western Province. After completing his studies, he qualified as an engineer, joining the Villagers rugby team.

=== 1951 Springbok's Tour ===
In 1951 he was chosen to represent the South African national team, on their fourth tour of Great Britain. According to South African journalist R.K. Stent, who travelled with the team during the five months, Fry was the player who most improved during the tour. Stent wrote, that at the beginning, Fry was an unlikely choice for team selection, but by the tour's end he was difficult to leave out. Given the number 27 shirt, Fry played in all five Test matches of the tour and 15 of the matches against club and county teams. His first match of the tour was on 13 October 1951, as flanker against the South Western Counties. Fry was then chosen for every other match for the next six games, scoring his first points with a try in the win over the North West Counties. In the match against the North East Counties on 3 November, Fry was initially selected at number eight, with Basil Kenyon as flanker; though the two switched positions almost immediately after play started.

Fry won his first international cap on 24 November 1951, in the encounter with Scotland. Scotland were totally overwhelmed, and lost the game 44–0; with Fry being the only South African forward not to score during the match. Fry continued to represent South Africa in the Tests, and played in the wins over Ireland, Wales and England. After the Welsh game the entire team, apart from Fonnie du Toit and Fry, were rested for the encounter with the Combined Services team. Fry was given the captaincy for the match, becoming the fifth player to hold the role during the tour. After the final match of the British leg of the tour, the team travelled to France. Despite Fry being the only player on the tour to have experience of playing in France, he was left out of the first match, against a South East France team. Fry was reselected for the final three games, playing at number eight, and again holding the captaincy for the match against South West France. He was back in his role as flanker against the France 'B' team and on 16 February 1952 played in the last game of the tour in a convincing win over France.

=== 1953 Australia tour of South Africa ===
The next year saw John Solomon's Australian team touring South Africa. Four Tests were arranged and Fry was to play in all of them. The first was a South Africa win at Johannesburg, but the Second Test, played at Cape Town, saw Fry on the losing side as an international for the first time. Australia won 14–18, with the defeat put down to a South Africans tactical change to try and run with the ball more, in a desire to play to the crowd. Fry kept his place for the remaining two games, wins at Durban and Port Elizabeth.

=== 1955 British Lions ===
Fry played his final matches for the Springboks when he captained the team for all four Tests against 1955 touring British Lions. Despite being captain of the national team, Fry was not amongst the Western Province team who were beaten by the Lions in a pre-Test game on 14 July. The first Test of the tour, at Johannesburg, saw the Lions win narrowly, 22–23. This was followed by a South African win in the second Test at Cape Town, but a 6–9 loss in the third Test in Pretoria meant that the final game would decide the tour. South Africa won the final game 22–8, drawing the tour. Fry never played for South Africa again, finishing his career with 10 wins from 13 games.

== Bibliography ==
- Billot, John (1974). Springboks in Wales. Ferndale: Ron Jones Publications.
- Griffiths, John (1987). The Phoenix Book of International Rugby Records. London: Phoenix House. ISBN 0-460-07003-7.
- Parker, A.C. (1970). The Springboks, 1891–1970. London: Cassell & Company Ltd. ISBN 0-304-93591-3.
- Stent, R.K. (1952). The Fourth Springboks 1951–1952. London: Longmans, Green and Co.

Sporting positions
Preceded by Hennie Muller	Springbok Captain; 1955	Succeeded by Basie Viviers
