= Geoff Beckingham =

Welsh rugby union player

- Full name: Geoffrey Thomas Beckingham
- Born: 29 July 1924 Barry, Wales
- Died: 4 March 2005 (aged 80) Barry, Wales
- School: Romilly School
- Occupation: Municipal gardener

Rugby union career
- Position: Hooker
Senior career
Years	Team	Apps	(Points)
1948–58	Cardiff	331	
International career
Years	Team	Apps	(Points)
1953–58	Wales	3	(0)

Geoffrey Thomas Beckingham (29 July 1924 – 4 March 2005) was a Welsh international rugby union player.

A native of Barry, Beckingham was educated at Romilly School in Dinas Powys.

Beckingham played his rugby for Cardiff and had a starring role in their 1953 win over the touring All Blacks.

Capped three times by Wales, Beckingham played twice in the 1953 Five Nations, then once in the 1958 Five Nations, with his international opportunities limited due to the presence of Bryn Meredith.

== See also ==
- List of Wales national rugby union players
