= Chum Ochse =

South African rugby union player

- Born: Johannes Karl Ochse; 9 February 1925 Graaf-Reinet, South Africa
- Died: 13 July 1996 (aged 71) Paarl, South Africa
- Height: 1.75 m (5 ft 9 in)
- Weight: 83 kg (13 st 1 lb)
- Occupation: School teacher

Rugby union career
- Position: Wing
Amateur team(s)
Years	Team	Apps	(Points)
- Paarl RFC
Provincial / State sides
Years	Team	Apps	(Points)
- Eastern Province
-	Boland		
-	Border		
–	Western Province		
International career
Years	Team	Apps	(Points)
1951–53	South Africa	7	(9)

Johannes Karl "Chum" Ochse (9 February 1925 – 13 July 1996) was a South African rugby union wing. Ochse played club rugby for Paarl and provincial rugby for Western Province. Ochse was capped seven time for the South African national team and was a member of the 1951–52 South Africa rugby tour of Great Britain, Ireland and France. He finished the tour as his country's highest try scorer.

== Personal history ==
Ochse was born in Graaf-Reinet South Africa in 1925, he was universally known as "Chum" as his father was before him. After leaving school he studied at Paarl Training College where he qualified to be a school teacher. As well as rugby, he had a great interest in athletics and cricket. He died in Paarl in 1996.

== Rugby career ==
=== Early career ===
Ochse played rugby from an early age, and at club level represented Paarl, also playing for Paarl Training College where he changed his position form scrum-half to centre on advice of the college coach. He is unusual in representing four provinces: Eastern Province, Boland, Border and Western Province. During the 1949 New Zealand tour of South Africa, Ochse was part of the Western Province team that faced the 'All Blacks', playing at centre. He again faced the same touring 'All Blacks' in the final match before the fourth and final Test, this time playing at wing for a Western Province Town side.

=== 1951 tour of Britain ===
In 1951 Ochse was selected for the fourth South Africa rugby tour of Britain, Ireland and France. Ochse was one of the more regular players of the tour, playing 19 of the 31 arranged games. He was also a regular in the international matches, playing in four of the five. Four wings were chosen for the tour, with the tour management rotating the two wing positions each match. Oche missed the first game of the tour, but was selected with Marais on the opposite wing for the second match against a combined South West Counties team. South Africa won 17–8.

Ochse's next two matches were against two Welsh teams, Cardiff and Llanelli. The tourists won both matches, with Ochse on the score-sheet in both, with a pair of tries in both. In the build up to the first international encounter, Ochse found himself playing with greater regularity. He played in the wins over a joint Glasgow/Edinburgh team, Cambridge University and Neath/Aberavon and the only loss of the tour, to London Counties. He also improved his try tally with one each in the Cambridge University and Neath/Aberavon games. Despite his continued success on the field, when South Africa played their first Test, against Scotland, Ochse was omitted. South African sports journalist, R.K. Stent, in his 1952 book The Fourth Springboks, reveals that this was a great surprise as it was thought Ochse was the first choice as a wing. Stent later heard that his omission was due to a perceived weakness in his defensive play, though Stent himself believed that such a flaw was only apparent in his first match against the South West Counties.

Ochse was back in the squad after the Scotland victory, scoring a try in the win over North of Scotland. He was then awarded his first cap, replacing Marais in the second international, in the encounter against Ireland. South Africa won 17–5 with Ochse scoring his first international points, a try in the first half. Ochse was then rested for the next game to Munster, before being reselected to face Swansea. Ochse continued his scoring streak with another try in the win over Swansea; the third consecutive match he had scored in. Ochse won his third cap when he was selected for the game against Wales. The South African management kept faith with Ochse, though they changed the back strategy to bring Schoor around to cover in case of an Ochse 'slip-up'. Ochse had an excellent game, though his first prominent move was not in attack but in defence when he tackled Ken Jones in mid stride. His second important move of the match came at the end of the first half. A lobbed pass from Lategan at the 25-yard line was collected by Ochse who crossed the line for a try and the first score of the game. The game ended 6–3 to South Africa.

After the Wales game Ochse was again rested, before facing a Mid Counties team. The game was extremely low scoring, South Africa winning by a single penalty goal from Viviers. The next game against England Ochse was reselected, his third cap, though a win for the Springboks Ochse did not score. Ochse played in three more games before the tour moved to France, against the Western Counties, South of Scotland and the Barbarians. In all three games the South Africans were victorious, and Ochse scored tries in each of them.

In France, Ochse played in three of the four games, including the international against France. He scored just once more, a try against the France B team. He ended the tour as South Africa's highest try scorer with 15 tries.

=== 1953 Australia tour ===
On his return to South Africa, Ochse was still an important part of the South African team. When the touring Australian team of 1953 came to Africa, he along with fellow 1951 tourist Marais were chosen as wings for the national team in the first Test. South Africa won 25–3. In the second Test, South Africa, reacting to the demands of the public, switched their play away from their kicking attack style of play, to holding the ball and running at their opponents. The tactic failed, and although Osche scored a try in the game, South Africa lost 14–18. The selectors reacted by dropping six players, which included both wings, Ochse and Marais. The South Africans regained control of the series by winning the third Test, and Ochse was called one last time to represent the Sprigboks in the final Test. South Africa won the final game 22–9 taking the series 3–1.

== Bibliography ==
- Billot, John (1974). Springboks in Wales. Ferndale: Ron Jones Publications.
- Griffiths, John (1987). The Phoenix Book of International Rugby Records. London: Phoenix House. ISBN 0-460-07003-7.
- Parker, A.C. (1970). The Springboks, 1891–1970. London: Cassell & Company Ltd. ISBN 0-304-93591-3.
- Stent, R.K. (1952). The Fourth Springboks 1951–1952. London: Longmans, Green and Co.
