= Fonnie du Toit =

South African rugby union player

- Full name: Pieter Alfonso du Toit
- Born: 13 March 1920 Vryburg, South Africa
- Died: 21 July 2001 (aged 81) Pretoria, South Africa
- Height: 1.74 m (5 ft 9 in)
- Weight: 77.1 kg (170 lb)

Rugby union career
- Position: Scrum–half
Provincial / State sides
Years	Team	Apps	(Points)
- Northern Transvaal
International career
Years	Team	Apps	(Points)
1949–52	South Africa	8	(6)

Pieter Alfonso "Fonnie" du Toit (13 March 1920 – 21 July 2001) was a South African international rugby union player.

== Biography ==
Born in Vryburg, du Toit was an insurance agent by profession.

A sturdy scrum–half, du Toit represented Northern Transvaal and was capped eight times for the Springboks, as a halfback partner of provincial teammate Hannes Brewis. He debuted in their home series against the All Blacks in 1949, featuring in three of the tour Test matches. His try in the final international in Port Elizabeth helped the Springboks to sweep the series. He next represented the Springboks on their 1951–52 tour and played in all five of the internationals, again winning each one. For the final fixture in England, against Midland Counties, du Toit was the stand in Springboks captain.

== See also ==
- List of South Africa national rugby union players
