= Hennie Muller =

South African rugby union player (1922–1977)

- Muller before the England encounter in 1952
- Born: Hendrik Scholtz Vosloo Muller; 26 March 1922 Witbank, South Africa
- Died: 26 April 1977 (aged 55) Cape Town, South Africa Goodwood

Rugby union career
- Position: Number eight
Provincial / State sides
Years	Team	Apps	(Points)
- Transvaal
-	Western Province		
International career
Years	Team	Apps	(Points)
1949, 1951-52 & 1953	South Africa	13	(16)
- Correct as of 2025-06-15
Coaching career
- Years: Team
- 1960, '61, '63 & '65.: South Africa 16 Tests
- Correct as of 2025-05-15

Hendrik Scholtz Vosloo Muller (26 March 1922 – 26 April 1977) was a South African rugby union footballer. Born in Witbank, Muller is considered one of the greatest South African rugby players, captaining South Africa in nine tests, and is a member of the International Rugby Hall of Fame. His usual position was at number eight.

== Career history ==
Muller made his international debut on 16 July 1949, in the starting line-up in the first of four matches against the touring New Zealand All Blacks. South Africa won the first test, 15–11, which was played at Newlands. The Springboks' winning ways continued at Ellis Park, when they won the second test 12–6. South Africa made it 3 games to nil with a 9–3 win in Durban. The series was tied up as a four to nil whitewash of the All Blacks, as the Springboks won the fourth encounter 11–8 in Port Elizabeth.

In 1951 Muller skippered South Africa at Murrayfield in Edinburgh, which saw the Springboks run away 44–0 winners, with Muller scoring one try. After defeating Scotland, the Springboks had the tough task of playing the other three home nations, as well as France on the rest of the tour. The Springboks made it two from two at Lansdowne Road, defeating Ireland 17–5. Muller guided the team to a closer victory in the subsequent match against Wales in Cardiff, which saw the Springboks keep the clean winning record on tour 3–0, winning the game 6–3, a South African drop-goal proving the difference between the two sides.

The tour had now entered early January, and the Springboks defeated England at Twickenham 8–3. Muller scored five of South Africa's nine points, with a conversion and penalty goal. Having defeated all four home nations, the final task to achieving a grand slam was to defeat France in Paris. The Springboks ran in six tries to win 25–3, Muller scoring one of the tries, as well as adding a conversion, and thus, South Africa completing a grand slam tour of Europe.

Muller captained the side against Australia for a four test series in South Africa in 1953. Muller scored a try in the opening exchange at Elils Park, which saw the home side win 25–3. The Wallabies hit back in Cape Town, taking the second test 18–14. However South Africa won the next test, 18–8 in Durban. In Muller's final match for the Springboks, played in Port Elizabeth, South Africa won 22–9. Muller would go on to coach the Springboks in 1965. In 2001, he was inducted into the International Rugby Hall of Fame. In 2015 he was inducted into the World Rugby Hall of Fame held in England with the 2015 Rugby World Cup.

Club Rugby Career:

Parow RFC : 1946 - 1st Team

Northerns RFC (Connect NTK RFC)

1952 - 1955 : 1st Team & Captain. 1956 - 1977 : 1st Team Coach. 1967 : Life Member

The Clubhouse inside the clubs Pavilion was named after him "Hennie Muller Hall" The club is situated in Parow North at the Jan Burger Sports Complex. He served the club for over 25 years. The club celebrated his 100th birthday posthumous on 26 March 2022 with a rugby day and special function called the Hennie Muller 100 Rugby Day in his honour with family members, past players who he coached and friends.

== Bibliography ==
- Billot, John (1974). Springboks in Wales. Ferndale: Ron Jones Publications.
- Griffiths, John (1987). The Phoenix Book of International Rugby Records. London: Phoenix House. ISBN 0-460-07003-7.
- Parker, A.C. (1970). The Springboks, 1891–1970. London: Cassell & Company Ltd. ISBN 0-304-93591-3.
- Stent, R.K. (1952). The Fourth Springboks 1951–1952. London: Longmans, Green and Co.

Sporting positions
Preceded by Basil Kenyon	Springbok Captain; 1951–1953	Succeeded by Stephen Fry
