= 1912–13 South Africa rugby union tour of Europe =

- Manager: Max Honnet
- Tour captain: Billy Millar
Summary
P	W	D	L
Total
27	24	0	3
Test match
5	5	0	0
Opponent
P	W	D	L
Scotland
1	1	0	0
Ireland
1	1	0	0
England
1	1	0	0
Wales
1	1	0	0
France
1	1	0	0

Tour chronology
- ← 1906–07 Europe 1921 Aus & NZ →

In 1912-13 the South Africa national rugby union team toured England, France, Ireland, Scotland, and Wales, playing a series of test matches, as well as games against club, regional, and representative teams. South Africa accomplished their first Grand Slam by winning all four tests against the Home Nations sides, and also won the test match against France. This was the second South African tour of the Northern Hemisphere, after the very successful 1906 tour.

Although not managing to win all the matches on the tour, the Springboks won all five test matches against international opposition. Billy Millar was the tour captain even though he was the last person chosen for the tour and was not the selectors' choice of captain, but they were over-ruled by the South African Rugby Board. Millar did have the advantage of being one of the few players to have toured Britain in the previous test, but was seen by the hosts as a fiery character and was not as popular with the players or fans as the 1906's tour captain, Paul Roos. The other two members of the squad to have played in the 1906 tour were vice-captain Fred 'Uncle' Dobbin and Doug Morkel.

In the touring party were two sets of brothers; Richard, Freddie and John Luyt and Gerhard and Jack Morkel.

== Touring party ==
- Manager: Max Honnet
- Captain: Billy Millar
- Vice-captain Frederick Dobbin

=== Full back ===
- J. J. Meintjies (Griqualand West)
- Gerhard Morkel (Western Province)

=== Three-quarters ===
- Otto van der Hoff (Transvaal)
- William Krige (Western Province)
- Richard Luyt (Western Province)
- Boetie McHardy (Orange Free State)
- Wally Mills (Western Province)
- Jacky Morkel (Western Province)
- Johan Stegmann (Transvaal)
- Bai Wrentmore (Western Province)

=== Half-backs ===
- Uncle Dobbin (Griqualand West)
- J. H. Immelman (Western Province)
- Freddie Luyt (Western Province)
- J. D. McCulloch (Griqualand West)

=== Forwards ===
- J. S. Braine (Griqualand West)
- S. N. Cronje (Transvaal)
- E. T. Delaney (Griqualand West)
- J. A. J. Francis (Transvaal)
- Saturday Knight (Transvaal)
- Septimus Ledger (Griqualand West)
- L. H. Louw (Western Province)
- John Luyt (Eastern Province)
- Billy Millar (Western Province)
- Dougie Morkel (Transvaal)
- Boy Morkel (Western Province)
- E. H. Shum (Transvaal)
- Tommy Thompson (Western Province)
- T. F. van Vuuren (Eastern Province)

== Match summary ==
Complete list of matches played by the Springboks in Europe:

Test matches

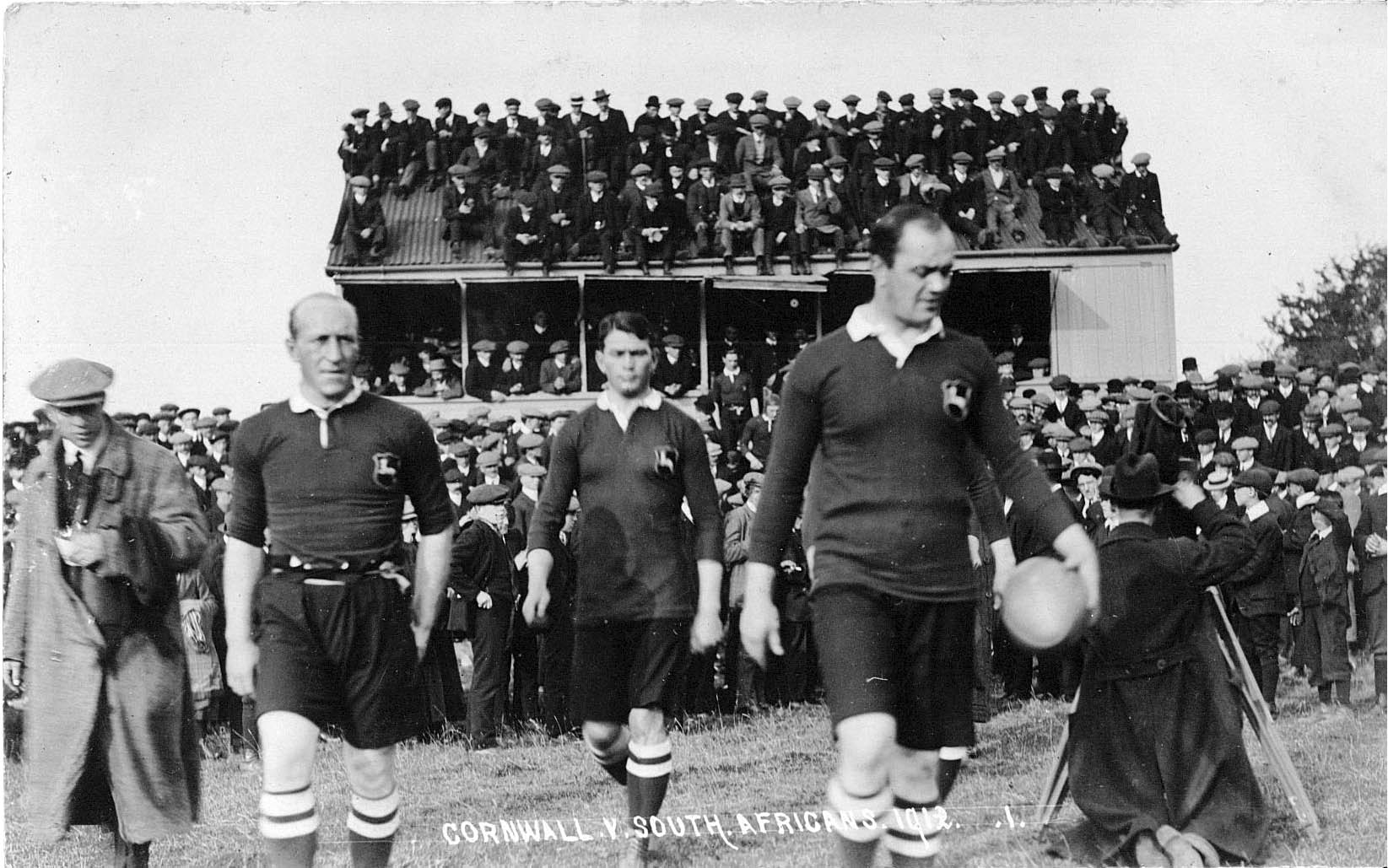
Captain Douglas Morkel holding the ball, besides him, G. Thompson (left) and S.N. Cronje, entering the pitch to play Cornwall in Redruth

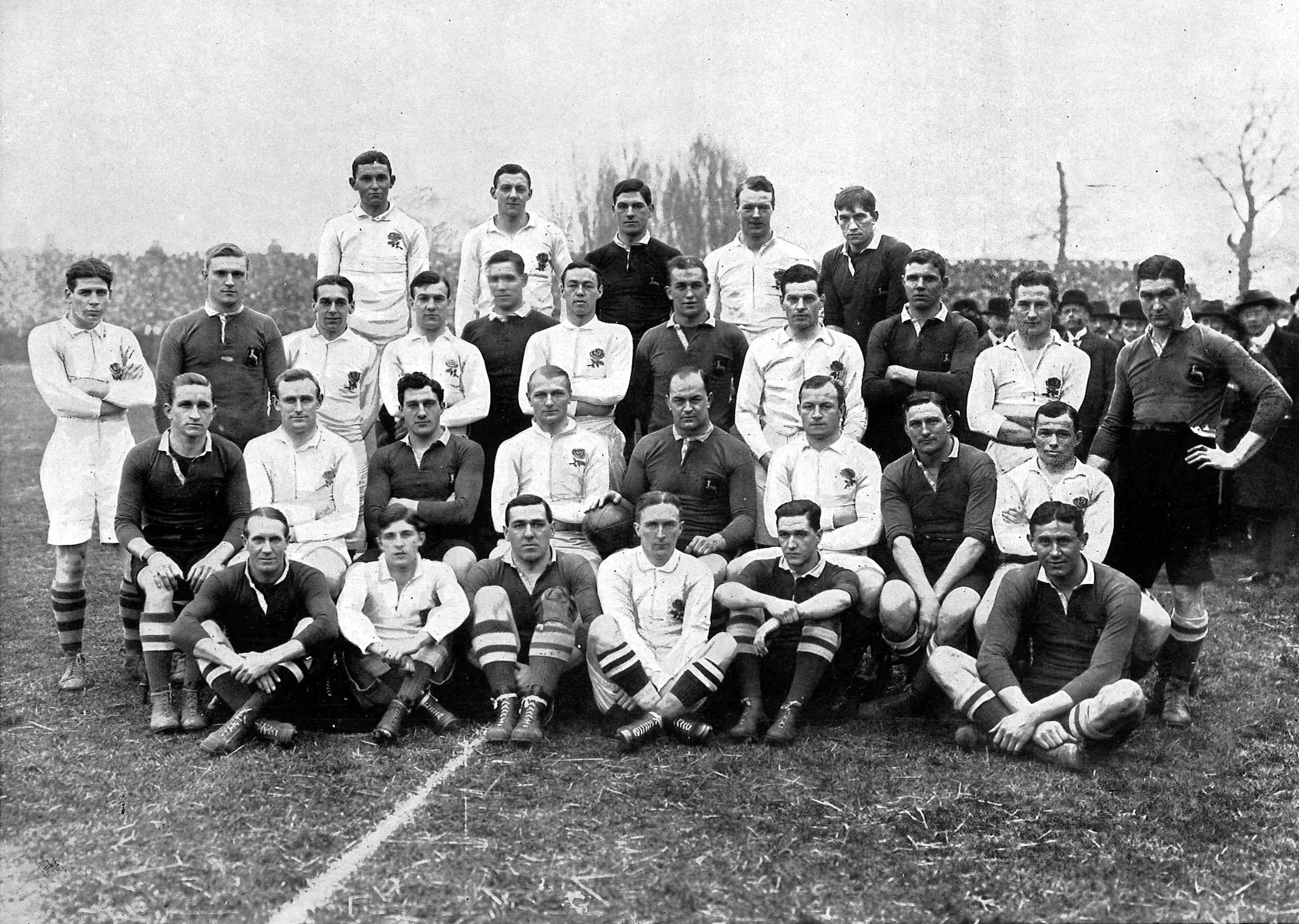
England and South Africa teams posing together for their Test match at Twickenham, 4 Jan 1913

#	Date	Opponents	City	Venue	Score
1	3 Oct 1912	Somerset RU	Bath		24–3
2	5 Oct 1912	Devon RU	Exeter		8–0
3	10 Oct 1912	Cornwall	Redruth		15–6
4	12 Oct 1912	Monmouthshire	Pontypool	Recreation Ground	16–0
5	17 Oct 1912	Glamorgan	Cardiff	Cardiff Arms Park	35–3
6	19 Oct 1912	Llanelli RFC	Llanelli	Stradey Park	8–7
7	24 Oct 1912	Newport RFC	Newport	Rodney Parade	3–9
8	26 Oct 1912	London Counties	Blackheath		12–8
9	30 Oct 1912	Combined Services	Portsmouth		18–16
10	2 Nov 1912	East Midlands	Northampton		14–5
11	6 Nov 1912	Oxford University RFC	Oxford		6–0
12	9 Nov 1912	Midland Counties	Leicester		25–3
13	14 Nov 1912	Cambridge University	Cambridge		24–0
14	16 Nov 1912	London Counties	London	Twickenham Stadium	8–10
15	20 Nov 1912	Northern Counties	Newcastle		17–0
16	23 Nov 1912	Scotland	Inverleith		16–0
17	27 Nov 1912	Combined Scottish Districts	Glasgow	New Anniesland	38–3
18	30 Nov 1912	Ireland	Dublin	Lansdowne Road	38–0
19	4 Dec 1912	Ulster	Belfast		19–0
20	7 Dec 1912	Northern Counties	Birkenhead	Birkenhead Park	21–8
21	14 Dec 1912	Wales	Cardiff	Cardiff Arms Park	3–0
22	19 Dec 1912	Neath RFC	Neath	The Gnoll	8–3
23	21 Dec 1912	Cardiff RFC	Cardiff	Cardiff Arms Park	7–6
24	26 Dec 1912	Swansea RFC	Swansea	St Helen's Ground	0–3
25	28 Dec 1912	Gloucestershire RU	Bristol		11–0
26	4 Jan 1913	England	London	Twickenham Stadium	9–3
27	11 Jan 1913	France	Le Bouscat	Stade Sainte-Germaine	38–5

Balance
Pl	W	D	L	Ps	Pc
27	24	0	3	441	101

== Match details ==
=== Monmouthshire ===
12 October

Monmouthshire	0–16	South Africa
		Try: Mills (2); F Luyt van Vuuren; Con:Wrentmore (2)

Recreation Ground, Pontypool
Attendance: 12,000
Referee: TD Schofield (Bridgend, Wales)

Team details

Monmouthshire
HA James (Abertillery), W Davies (Brynmawr), J Wetter (Newport), R Plummer (Newport), WJ Thomas (Abertillery), E Marsh (Abertillery), R Lloyd (Pontypool), Rees Thomas (Pontypool), F Talbot (Pontypool), E Stephens (Pontypool), T Davies (Pontypool), F Andrews (Pontypool), J Webb (Abertillery), J Hennessy (Rhymney), J Williams (Newport)
South Africa
PG Morkel, EE McHardy, WA Krige, FJ Dobbin, MJ Mills, FP Luyt, GM Wrentmore, ET Delaney, EH Shum, SH Ledger, AS Knight, TF van Vuuren, LH Louw, ET Delaney, WA Millar (capt.)

=== Glamorgan ===
17 October

Glamorgan RFC	3–35	South Africa
Try: B Lewis		Try: Stegmann (4), Mills, D Luyt, F Luyt, van Vuuren; Con: F Luyt; Pen: D Morkel; Drop: D Luyt

Arms Park, Cardiff
Attendance: 15,000
Referee: AO Jones (Leicester, England)

Team details

Glamorgan
P Howells (Penarth), G Heslop(Penarth), T Evans (Cardiff), William Davies (capt.) (Swansea), B Lewis (Swansea), J Rogers (Cardiff), Clem Lewis (Cardiff), W Jenkins (Cardiff), E Mithan (Cardiff), Bob Hayward (Llwynypia), W Hopkins (Aberavon), Harry Hiams (Llanelli), Glyn Stephens (Neath), T Williams (Swansea), T Morgan (Swansea)
South Africa
PG Morkel, JA Stegmann, RR Luyt, JWH Morkel, MJ Mills, FP Luyt, JH Immelman, ET Delaney, TF van Vuuren, WH Morkel, AS Knight, JAJ Francis, G Thompson, DF Morkel, WA Millar (capt.)

=== Llanelli ===
19 October

Llanelli RFC	7–8	South Africa
Try: J Evans; Drop: Hiams		Try: van der Hoff, J Morkel; Con: J Morkel

Stradey Park, Llanelli
Attendance: 15,000
Referee: Gil Evans (Birmingham, England)

Team details

Llanelli
F Rees, J Evans, W Watts, J Owen Davies, E Thomas, L Bennett, D Lloyd, S Phillips, G Evans, R Williams, DM Job, AJ Stacey (capt.), J Morgan, H Hiams, T Williams
South Africa
JJ Meintjies, EE McHardy, WA Krige, JWH Morkel, FJ Dobbin (capt.), JD McCulloch, EH Shum, SN Cronje, SH Ledger, JAJ Francis, LH Louw, A van der Hoff, JS Braine, JD Luyt, G Thompson

=== Newport ===
24 October

Newport RFC	9–3	South Africa
Try: Birt; Con:Birt drop: Birt		Try: D Morkel

Rodney Parade, Newport
Attendance: 18,300
Referee: F.C. Potter-Irwin (London, England)

Team details

Newport
H Wreford, Billy Geen, Walter Martin capt., J Wetter, Fred Birt, Reg Plummer, Tommy Vile, Jack Beames, J Williams, Harry Wetter, C Anderson, A Bell, R Dibble, Harry Uzzell, AR Williams
South Africa
JJ Meintjies, JA Stegmann, RR Luyt, GM Wrentmore, A van der Hoff, FP Luyt, JH Immelman, ET Delaney, JS Braine, JD Luyt, AS Knight, TF van Vuuren, G Thompson, DF Morkel, WA Millar (capt.)

=== Scotland ===
23 November

Scotland	0–16	South Africa
		Try: Stegmann (2), McHardy, W H Morkel; Con: D Morkel, G Morkel

Inverleith, Edinburgh
Attendance: 26,000
Referee: F.C. Potter-Irwin (London, England)

Team details

Scotland
Walter Dickson, Walter Sutherland, Alex Angus, AW Gunn, James Pearson, James Boyd, Eric Milroy, Patrick Blair, Lewis Robertson, WDCL Purves, David Howie, David Bain, JMB Scott, J Dobson, FH Turner capt.
South Africa
PG Morkel, JA Stegmann, RR Luyt, JWH Morkel, EE McHardy, FP Luyt, FJ Dobbin capt., JD Luyt, SH Ledger, G Thompson, TF van Vuuren, JAJ Francis, DFT Morkel, WH Morkel, AS Knight

=== Ireland ===
30 November

Ireland	0–38	South Africa
		Try: Stegmann (3), McHardy (3), J Morkel (2), Francis, Millar; Con: G Morkel (3), JD Luyt

Lansdowne Road, Dublin
Attendance: 20,000
Referee: John Dallas (1st half)
Fred Gardiner (2nd half)
F.C. Potter-Irwin (London, England) [sick]

Team details

Ireland	South Africa

Ireland
CP Stuart, R Watson, GW Holmes, JB Minch, M Abraham, RA Lloyd capt., HM Read, G. S. Brown, RB Burgess, SBB Campbell, H Moore, C Adams, R d'A Patterson, FG Schute, JJ Clune
South Africa
PG Morkel, JA Stegmann, RR Luyt, JWH Morkel, EE McHardy, FP Luyt, FJ Dobbin, WA Millar capt., SH Ledger, G Thompson, TF van Vuuren, JAJ Francis, DFT Morkel, WH Morkel, AS Knight

=== Wales ===
14 December

Wales	0–3	South Africa
		Pen: D Morkel

Arms Park, Cardiff
Attendance: 30,000
Referee: F.C. Potter-Irwin (London, England)

Team details

Wales
Bobbie Williams (Cardiff), Billy Geen (Newport), Fred Birt (Newport), Billy Spiller (Cardiff), Reg Plummer (Newport), Horace Thomas (Swansea), Tommy Vile (Newport) (capt.), F Andrews (Pontypool), Rees Thomas (Pontypool), F Perrett (Neath), Glyn Stephens (Neath), Percy Jones (Newport), Harry Wetter (Newport), Bert Hollingdale (Swansea), Johnnie Morgan (Llanelli)
South Africa
PG Morkel, JA Stegmann, RR Luyt, JWH Morkel, EE McHardy, FP Luyt, FJ Dobbin, JAJ Francis, JD Luyt, AS Knight, TF van Vuuren, G Thompson, WH Morkel, DF Morkel, WA Millar (capt.)

=== Neath ===
19 December

Neath RFC	3–8	South Africa
Try: Richards		Try: Van der Hoff; W Morkel; Con: D Morkel

The Gnoll, Neath
Attendance: 15,000
Referee: R.G. Smith (Bristol, England)

Team details

Neath
G Gethin, H Richards, G Rees, T Owen Jones, T John, F Rees, S Evans, F David (capt.), T Jenkins, F Perrett, W Hopkins, J Pullman, W Davies, G Stephens, TC Lloyd
South Africa
PG Morkel, A van der Hoff, RR Luyt, JWH Morkel, MJ Mills, FP Luyt, JH Immelman, EH Shum, JAJ Francis, ET Delaney, AS Knight, WH Morkel, G Thompson, DF Morkel, WA Millar (capt.)

=== Cardiff ===
21 December

Cardiff RFC	6–7	South Africa
Try: Spiller; Pen: Rogers		Pen: D Morkel; Drop: J Morkel

Arms Park, Cardiff
Referee: J.H. Miles (Leicester, England)

Team details

Cardiff
RF Williams, W Bowen, Billy Spiller (capt.), T Evans, WT Grassmore, Clem Lewis, J Rogers, WJ Jenkins, C Palmer, A Barker, JS Michael, J Birch, F Gaccon, T Mithan, A Green
South Africa
PG Morkel, JA Stegmann, RR Luyt, JWH Morkel, EE McHardy, FP Luyt, JH Immelman, FJ Dobbin, JAJ Francis, JD Luyt, AS Knight, TF van Vuuren, G Thompson, DF Morkel, WA Millar (capt.)

=== Swansea ===
26 December

Swansea RFC	3–0	South Africa
Try: Thomas

St. Helen's, Swansea
Attendance: 35,000
Referee: James Greenlees (Scotland)

Team details

Swansea
D Williams, Howell Lewis, WJ Trew (capt.), T Williams, F Williams, O Jenkins, Sidney Jerram, E Morgan, David John Thomas, B Williams, Tom Morgan, B Hollingdale, G Evans, H Moultan, G Hayward
South Africa
PG Morkel, JA Stegmann, RR Luyt, JWH Morkel, WJ Mills, FP Luyt, FJ Dobbin, SH Ledger, JAJ Francis, JD Luyt, AS Knight, WH Morkel, G Thompson, DF Morkel, WA Millar (capt.)

=== England ===
4 January

England	3–9	South Africa
Try: Poulton		Try: J Morkel; Pen: D Morkel (2)

Twickenham, London
Attendance: 29,000
Referee: John Tulloch (Scotland)

Team details

England	South Africa

England
William Johnston, Cyril Lowe, FM Stoop, RW Poulton, VHM Coates, W. J. A. Davies, WI Cheesman, JAS Ritson, Norman Wodehouse, SEJ Smart, JA King, LG Brown, AL Kewney, Jenny Greenwood, CH Pillman
South Africa
PG Morkel, JA Stegmann, RR Luyt, JWH Morkel, EE McHardy, FP Luyt, JD McCulloch, SH Ledger, JAJ Francis, EM Shum, AS Knight, WH Morkel, TF van Vuuren, DF Morkel, WA Millar (capt.)

=== France ===
11 January

France	5–35	South Africa
Try: Bruneau; Con: André		Try: Francis, Ledger, R Luyt, McHardy (2), D Morkel (2), J Morkel, W Morkel; Con: D Morkel (2), J Morkel (2); Pen: D Morkel

Le Bouscat, Gironde
Attendance: 20,000
Referee: W. Williams (England)

Team details

France	South Africa

France
FB J Caujolle, G Andre, M Bruneau, J Sentilles, P Jaureguy, A Chatau, M Hedembaigt, P Mauriat, JR Pascarel, H Tilh, P Mouniq, M Leuvielle capt., M Legrain, F Forgues, M Communeau
South Africa
PG Morkel, JA Stegmann, JWH Morkel, RR Luyt, EE McHardy, J Immelman, J McCulloch, D Morkel, T van Vuuren, A Knight, W Morkel, SH Ledger, JAJ Francis, WA Millar capt., J Luyt

== Bibliography ==
- Billot, John (1974). Springboks in Wales. Ferndale, Glamorgan: Ron Jones Publications.
