= Billy Geen =

Wales international rugby union footballer

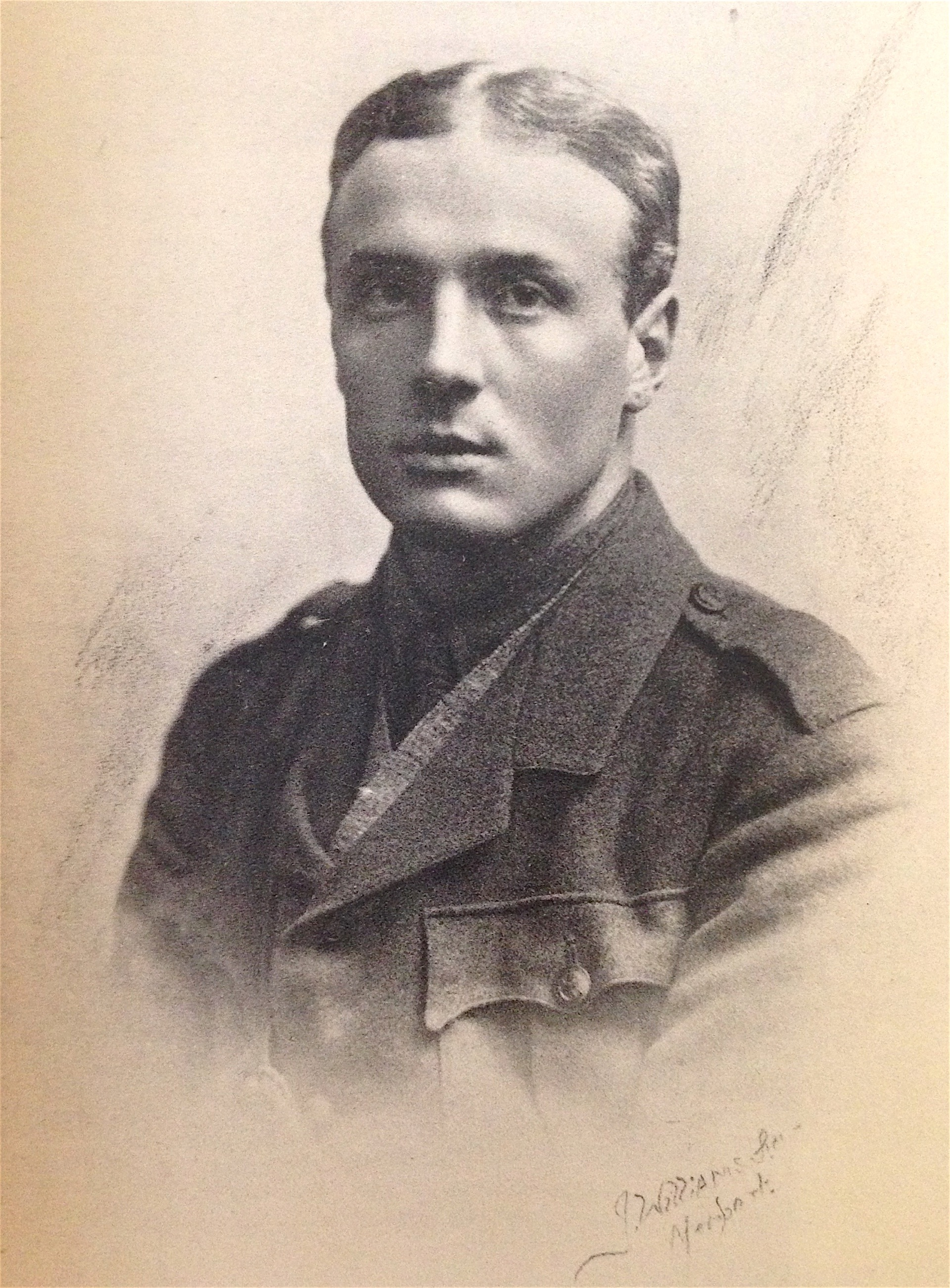
- Born: William Purdon Geen; 14 March 1891 Newport, Wales
- Died: 31 July 1915 (aged 24) Hooge, Flanders, Belgium
- School: Haileybury College
- University: Oxford University
- Notable relative: Frank Purdon (uncle)

Rugby union career
- Position(s): Wing, Centre
Amateur team(s)
Years	Team	Apps	(Points)
1910–1913	Oxford University RFC		
1911–1915	Barbarian F.C.		
–	Blackheath F.C.		
–	Monmouthshire		
Senior career
Years	Team	Apps	(Points)
1910–1914	Newport RFC	37	(61)
International career
Years	Team	Apps	(Points)
1912–1913	Wales	3	(0)
- Military career
- Allegiance: United Kingdom
- Branch: British Army
- Service years: 1914–1915
- Rank: Second lieutenant
- Unit: 9th King's Royal Rifle Corps
- Conflicts: First World War: Western Front; Ypres Salient actions; Battle of Hooge (1915) †
- Memorials: Menin Gate

William Purdon Geen (14 March 1891 – 31 July 1915) was a rugby union wing and centre, who represented Wales, and played club rugby for Oxford University and Newport and county rugby for Monmouthshire. He was also invited to play for the Barbarians on several occasions. Geen unsuccessfully trialled for England in 1910, but was selected and played for Wales on three occasions in the 1912–1913 season. Injury prevented him from playing more internationals, and his service in the First World War put an end to his career.

Geen excelled athletically at Oxford, earning four Blues between 1910 and 1913. However, in three successive Varsity Matches, he failed to score after dropping the ball over the tryline. In the holidays, he played club rugby for Newport, and he was part of the team that defeated the touring South African side of 1912–1913. He was also a decent cricketer keeping wicket for Oxford University Authentics and Monmouthshire.

Geen was commissioned second lieutenant into the 9th King's Royal Rifle Corps in August 1914, and sent to the Western Front in May 1915. He was killed in action in Hooge, Belgium. He is remembered on the Menin Gate memorial.

== Early life ==
Geen was born in Newport, Wales. He went to school in England at Northam Place, Potter's Bar, and then Haileybury College before being accepted into Oxford University. At Haileybury he was wicketkeeper for the cricket team; he also captained the rugby team, playing at centre.

== Rugby career ==
Although Geen was a decent cricketer, keeping wicket for Oxford University Authentics and Monmouthshire in the Minor Counties Championship between 1909 and 1912, his rugby playing was more notable. He played wing for Oxford and Wales, and centre for Newport. He was "in the thick of everything", a "class centre" with a "dodging style", according to the rugby journalist E. H. D. Sewell. He also appeared for Blackheath and the Barbarians. He was, however, repeatedly injured and his form was at times inconsistent. The First World War prevented him from playing more for Wales.

=== Oxford University and England trial ===
Geen was selected to play for Oxford against Cambridge in four consecutive years from 1910 to 1913. In the first of these, on 13 December 1910, a 9,000-strong crowd turned up at Queen's, mostly to watch Ronnie Poulton, playing for Oxford. Cambridge started strong but a try by Bryn Lewis was disallowed in the opening minutes after a touch judge signalled that Geen had put his foot into touch in the preceding Oxford move. Moments later, Poulton ran through the Cambridge defence, drew the fullback and passed to Geen to dive in at the corner for a try. With Turner's conversion, Oxford led 5–0. A similar passage of play again saw Poulton put Geen through for a try, but he dropped the ball after crossing the line while trying to get closer to the posts.

Geen got his second try after another break from Poulton. Cambridge meanwhile scored two tries and at half-time were leading 15–13. Fifteen minutes into the second half, a second try for Cambridge put them five points ahead. An injury to one of Cambridge's scoring wings reduced the team to fourteen players; a forward moved to cover the wing, giving Oxford an advantage in the forwards. Poulton capitalised on it: he scored from a dummy pass to Geen; and ran in a solo try after receiving a pass from flyhalf Freddie Knott. The end score was 23–18 to Oxford.

A couple of days before the Varsity Match, talk in the press had been of Geen's likely selection for England for the forthcoming Home Nations Championship. Geen and Poulton, who together were considered the scoring force of the Oxford team, were both selected to play for England in the second trial match against The North in Leeds. Although Geen scored a try in the game, his form was lacking and he was outshone by Poulton. So for the third and final trial, England versus The Rest on 7 January 1911, Geen was not selected.

In the run up to the 1911 Varsity Match, the Poulton–Geen partnership was a constant threat to opposition teams. Ten days before the Varsity Match, Oxford beat London Scottish 39–3. Twice Poulton put Geen in the clear, with the latter ending the day with four tries in total. On 12 December, Cambridge were favourites to win but Poulton captained Oxford to victory, in front of a crowd of 10,000. Geen's form coming into the game was suspect but he proved his worth. However, Poulton suffered a hamstring injury early on and his replacement Eric Thomas, a forward, lacked the speed and skills to combine effectively with Geen. Nevertheless, he came close to scoring, but, as he had done in the previous year's match, he dropped the ball over the tryline. He was to repeat the error the following year.

=== Newport Rugby Club and Wales ===
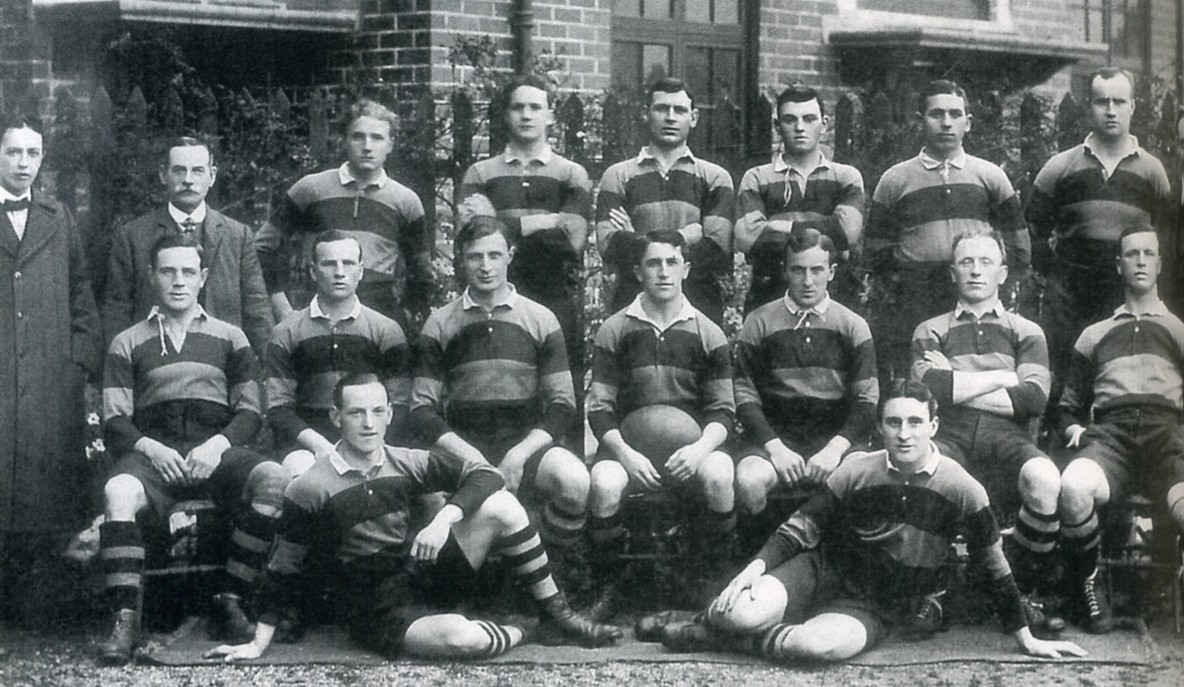
The Newport team that defeated South Africa in 1912. Billy Geen is the first player on the left of the back row.

Geen played for Newport Rugby Club before going to Oxford and returned to Newport during the holiday periods, providing "dazzling entertainment". He was described by Tommy Vile's biographer Philip J Grant as looking "the promising player in Wales"; and scored 10 tries and a dropped goal in 14 games for the Monmouthshire club. On 24 October 1912, he was part of the team that played and beat the touring South Africans 9–3. He was not first choice for the game, but when George Hirst failed to recover from an injury sustained at Leicester the week before, Geen was his replacement.

South Africa was as yet undefeated on the tour, with wins over Somerset, Devon, Cornwall, Monmouthshire, Glamorgan and Llanelli. Whereas Newport, according to "Dromio" (W J Townsend Collins) writing in the Argus, had been poor in attack in their previous three encounters and weak in defence in the last two. Townsend Collins later recollected that the South Africans were taller, heavier, stronger and faster. The Newport victory was the result of "superior tactics and superlative captaincy".

Just before half time, a try by Newport's Jack Wetter was disallowed for a forward pass. The ball was then worked back to Fred Birt, standing within range in front of the posts, and he kicked a drop-goal, putting the home side 4–0 ahead at the break. In the second half, the Springboks repeatedly attacked but the Newport defence kept them from crossing the line, although a break from Dick Luyt, the South African centre, left Douglas Morkel to score under the posts. Luyt failed to convert and Newport remained a point ahead. Newport scored again through a cross-kick from Wetter, which Birt jumped on over the line for a try, which he then converted.

Newport was one of only three teams to beat the Springboks on the tour and Geen played his part, bringing down Johan Stegmann when he was within sight of the try line. He was praised after the match for his play. The Times the following day reported: "Newport deserved the victory, if only for their remarkably sound and highly intelligent defence... In spite, however, of the good play of the Newport forwards ... the South African backs would have scored at least three tries but for the fine tackling of Geen and Reg Plummer, the Newport wings, who saved one certain try by just stopping Otto Van Der Hoff on the line."

Geen was then selected and played three times for Wales in the 1912–1913 season. He earned his first cap against the same touring South Africans on 14 December. His next international appearance, under the captaincy of his Newport teammate Tommy Vile, was on 18 January 1913 against England. Wales were beaten in Cardiff 0–12. After the game, and disappointed by the performance of most of the team, the selectors made nine changes for the upcoming match against Scotland. Only two backs were to be retained, Bobby Williams, the fullback, and Billy Geen, deemed the outstanding threequarter against England, moving from wing to centre. However, on the Wednesday preceding the encounter in Edinburgh, Geen withdrew after a training session due to an ongoing shoulder injury, and his place on the team was taken by Willie Watts.

His final game for Wales was on 8 March 1913 against Ireland, when he showed "brilliance and judgment" (according to Townsend Collins) helping to create two tries towards a Welsh 16–13 victory. Geen was selected to play centre for the first match of the 1914 Home Nations against England at Twickenham but was forced to withdraw due to injury. He was replaced, once again, by Willie Watts, and probably missed out on four more caps for Wales.

=== Barbarian F.C. ===
In 1911, Geen was approached by Barbarian F.C., an invitational touring rugby team based in England, to join them on their 1911 Easter tour. Geen played in two matches of the tour, the first a 15–8 loss against Cardiff RFC where he was captained by Ireland's Tommy Smyth. Despite missing the Swansea game two days later, Geen returned to the Barbarians squad to face Cheltenham, which ended in an 8–3 victory for the tourists. Later that year Geen was again invited to play for the Barbarians, another contest against Cardiff in their traditional Boxing Day encounter. In 1912 Geen played in his first Barbarians match outside Wales, facing the Leicester Tigers. His captain on that day was England international Edgar Mobbs, and although finishing on the losing side, Geen scored his first and only try for the Barbarians.

With the outbreak of the First World War in 1914, competitive rugby union matches were suspended. Despite this, Edgar Mobbs organised two Barbarians matches against Leicester in early 1915 to aid recruiting and to raise charity funds. Mobbs then arranged one final Barbarians match against the Royal Army Medical Corps (RAMC), leading a team made up of military personnel, including Geen in his last Barbarians appearance, to a 10–3 victory. Of Geen's teammates on that day, Mobbs and another England international Arthur James Dingle, would also die in action during the war.

=== International appearances for Wales ===
Opposition	Score	Result	Date	Venue	Ref(s)
South Africa	0–3	Lost	14 December 1912	Cardiff	
England	0–12	Lost	18 January 1913	Cardiff	
Ireland	16–13	Won	8 March 1913	Swansea	

== Military service and death ==
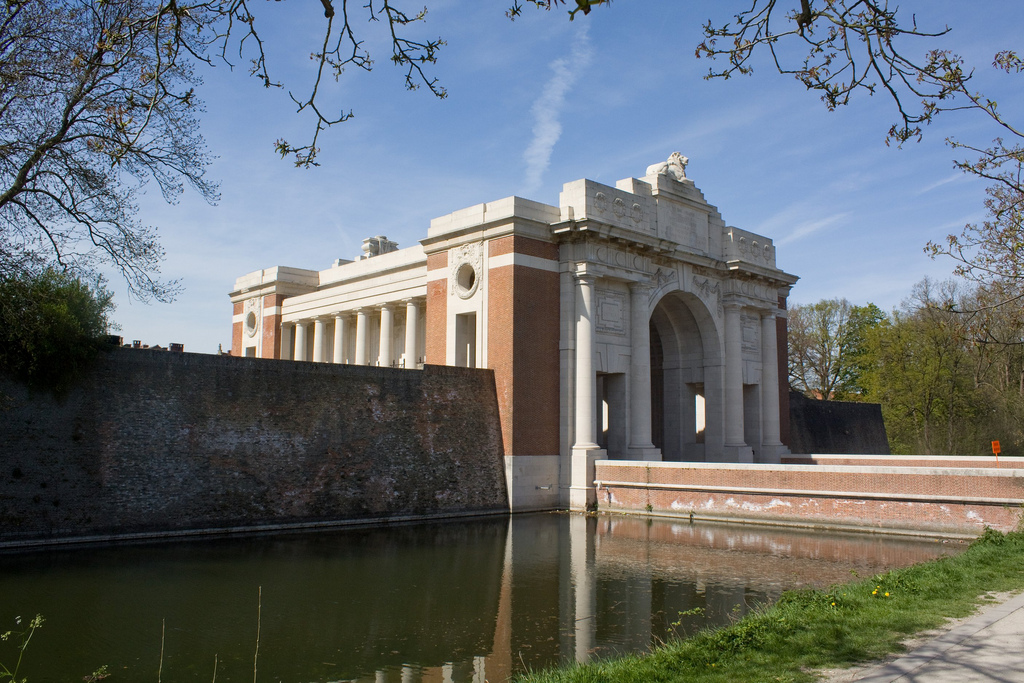
The Menin Gate Memorial to the Missing in Ypres, Belgium, where Billy Geen is commemorated

Geen was commissioned second lieutenant in the 9th Battalion, King's Royal Rifle Corps on 21 August 1914. He trained in Petworth and was sent to the Western Front in May 1915. The 9th was assigned to the 14th (Light) Division and served with it during the Second Battle of Ypres. After six weeks' combat, the battalion was withdrawn for rest but two days later was sent back to the front to reinforce the 41st Brigade. Geen was killed in action on 31 July 1915 at Hooge, Belgium. He was last seen leading his men in hand-to-hand fighting as they advanced towards ruined village buildings. Major John Hope wrote: "Geen fought gloriously, and was last seen alive leading his platoon in a charge after being for hours subjected to liquid fire and every device the Germans could bring to bear to break through. Seventeen officers and 333 other ranks of this battalion were killed in this engagement, in which officers and men showed themselves worthy of the best traditions of their Regiment."

Billy Geen is commemorated on panels 51 and 53 of the Menin Gate in Ypres, the memorial to missing soldiers from the battles of the Ypres Salient.
