= Jacky Morkel =

South African rugby union footballer

- Born: 13 November 1890 Somerset West
- Died: 15 May 1916 (aged 25) German East Africa
- Notable relatives: Gerhard Morkel (brother); Dougie Morkel (cousin)

Rugby union career
- Position: Centre
Senior career
Years	Team	Apps	(Points)
- Somerset West RFC
Provincial / State sides
Years	Team	Apps	(Points)
1911–1914	Western Province		
International career
Years	Team	Apps	(Points)
1912–1913	South Africa	5	(16)
- Military career
- Burial place: Dar es Salaam War Cemetery, Tanzania
- Allegiance: (Union of South Africa) South Africa
- Branch: Mounted Commandos, S.A. Forces
- Rank: Private
- Units: 1st Mounted Brigade, Van der Venter Scouts
- Conflicts: East African Campaign (World War I)

Jan "Jacky" Willem Hurter Morkel (13 November 1890 – 15 May 1916) was a South African international rugby union player, who also played first class cricket. Morkel played at centre for Somerset West RFC and Western Province. He was selected for South Africa for the 1912–13 tour of the Home Nations and France. He played in 18 games on the tour, including all five test matches, and scored four tries, two of them against Ireland. His brother, Gerhard, and his cousins 'Boy' and Dougie, were also on the tour. Jacky Morkel also represented Transvaal in cricket.

In the First World War, Morkel served as a scout in the 1st South African Mounted Brigade in German East Africa. When his unit was effectively cut off by the onset of the rainy season in April 1916, he and many of his fellow soldiers became sick. He died of dysentery, and is buried in the Dar es Salaam War Cemetery in modern-day Tanzania near Tommy Thompson, who was also on the 1912–1913 tour.

His entry on the International Roll of Honour reads:

He upheld in the worthiest possible manner the teachings of the rugby game....and his case will stand for all time as a shining example to his countrymen.

== Early life ==
Morkel was born on 13 November 1890 in Somerset West, in what is today the Western Cape, South Africa.

== Rugby career ==
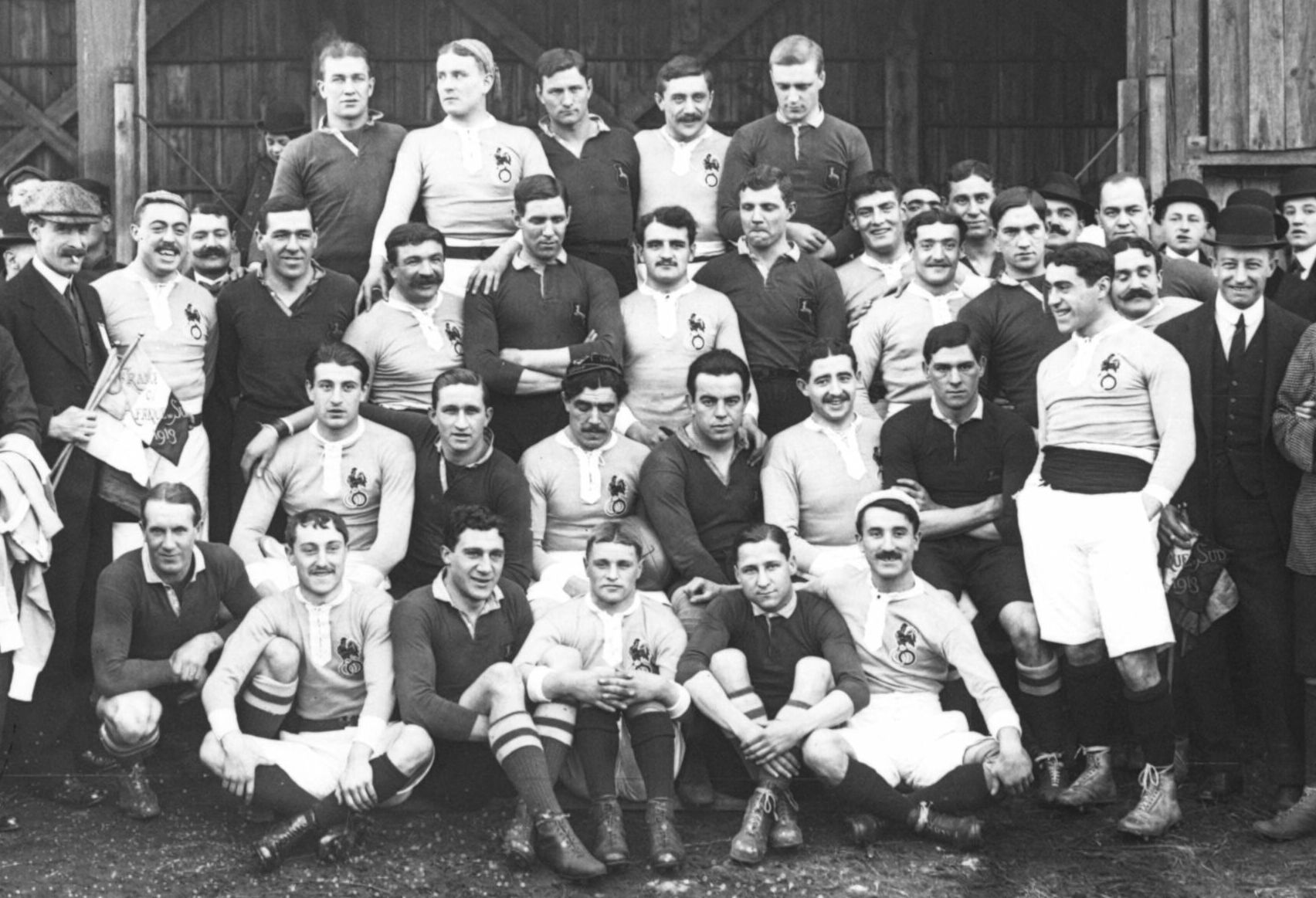
The rugby teams of France and South Africa for the test match, Bordeaux, 11 January 1913.

Morkel, who was a 'very quiet, unassuming fellow, a man of few words', was one of 21 brothers and cousins who played first class rugby in South Africa before the First World War, eight of whom played for the Springboks. Morkel played rugby for Somerset West Rugby Club, and from 1911 to 1914, for Western Province. He was selected to play for South Africa on the tour to Europe of 1912–13. Alongside Morkel in the team were his brother Gerhard, at full-back, and his cousins 'Boy' and Dougie, in the forwards.

The team played 27 matches, winning every game except those against Newport, Swansea and a combined London XV. Morkel himself played in the five tests against the Home Nations and France, and in 13 other matches. He scored four tries, two of them in the 0–38 victory over Ireland, one against England, and a try – as well as a conversion – against France. In the game against Llanelli, he kicked the ball over the three-quarters, caught it, then repeated the move against the full-back, and scored under the posts to take the game for South Africa by one point. Jacky and his cousin Dougie scored all the points in the victory over England.

Billy Geen and Fred Perrett, who were also killed in the First World War, were part of the Wales team that narrowly lost to the South African tourists in December 1912. Amongst the Springboks, as well as Jacky Morkel, both Sep Ledger and Tommy Thompson were also killed in action.

=== International appearances ===
Opposition	Score	Result	Date	Venue	Ref(s)
Scotland	0–16	Won	23 November 1912	Inverleith	
Ireland	0–38	Won	30 November 1912	Lansdowne Road	
Wales	0–3	Won	14 December 1912	Cardiff	
England	3–9	Won	4 January 1913	Twickenham	
France	5–38	Won	11 January 1913	Bordeaux	

== Military service ==
In the First World War, Morkel served as a scout with the 1st South African Mounted Brigade, under the command of Brigadier-General Jacob van Deventer in German East Africa. When Jan Smuts took command of the British Forces in East Africa on 12 February 1916, Morkel's brigade was with the 1st Division at Longido, following the unsuccessful assault on the German position at Salaita Hill. The brigade was transferred to Mbuyuni, arriving 4 March, where the 2nd Division was positioned, to act under the direct orders of Smuts, in the forthcoming move to occupy the Kilimanjaro area, before the rains arrived. The objective was rapidly achieved by 21 March, the 1st Mounted Brigade having played a critical role.

Smuts then reorganised his forces into three divisions: the First, under Major-General Hoskins; the Second, including the 1st South African Mounted Brigade at Aruscha, under van Deventer, recently promoted Major-General; and the Third, under Major-General Coen Brits. At the start of April, the forces under van Deventer began to advance southwards, the 1st Mounted Brigade taking Ufiome on 13 April, and pursuing the enemy until they reached Ssalanga on 17 April, where they paused to rest. By this time, the rainy season had set in, and van Deventer's division was cut off, and unable to progress beyond Kondoa Irangi. The troops lived off such local supplies as could be obtained, and their health severely deteriorated. The Germans, under direct command of Colonel von Lettow, the German Commander-in-Chief, took advantage of the situation to attack the 2nd Division at Kondoa Irangi, commencing on 7 May and continuing until 10 May, when they withdrew. Meanwhile, van Deventer was unable to counter due to the loss of horses from disease, and the sickness of his troops.

Morkel himself contracted dysentery and died on 15 May 1916. He is buried in Dar es Salaam War Cemetery (Grave 5. K. 6.) in Tanzania, near his friend and team-mate Tommy Thompson, who was shot dead soon after.

== See also ==
- List of international rugby union players killed in action during the First World War
- List of cricketers who were killed during military service
