= Hollingdale =

Hollingdale may refer to:

- Bert Hollingdale (1889–1961), Welsh international rugby union player
- Noel Hollingdale (1911–2000), Australian rugby union player
- Paul Hollingdale (1938–2017), British radio presenter
- Reginald John Hollingdale, English biographer and translator
- Thomas Hollingdale (1900–1978), Welsh international rugby union player
