= Kimberly High School =

Kimberly High School may refer to:

- Kimberly High School (Idaho), in Kimberly, Idaho
- Kimberly High School (Wisconsin), in Kimberly, Wisconsin

== See also ==
- Kimberley Boys' High School, Kimberley, Northern Cape, South Africa
- Kimberley Girls' High School, Kimberley, Northern Cape, South Africa
