= Morkel =

Morkel is a surname. Notable people with the surname include:

- Albie Morkel (born 1981), South African cricketer and older brother of Morne Morkel.
- Denys Morkel (1906–1980), South African cricketer
- Dougie Morkel (1885–1950), South African rugby union player
- Gerald Morkel (1941–2018), South African politician
- Harry Morkel (1888–1956), South African rugby union player
- Jacky Morkel (1890–1916), South African rugby union player
- John Morkel (1928–2010), South African born Rhodesian rugby union player
- Morné Morkel (born 1984), South African cricketer and younger brother of Albie Morkel.
