= John Clune =

John Clune may refer to:

- John J. Clune, director of athletics at the United States Air Force Academy
- John Clune (rugby union), Irish international rugby union player
