= Walter Michael Dickson =

Scotland international rugby union player

Mike Dickson
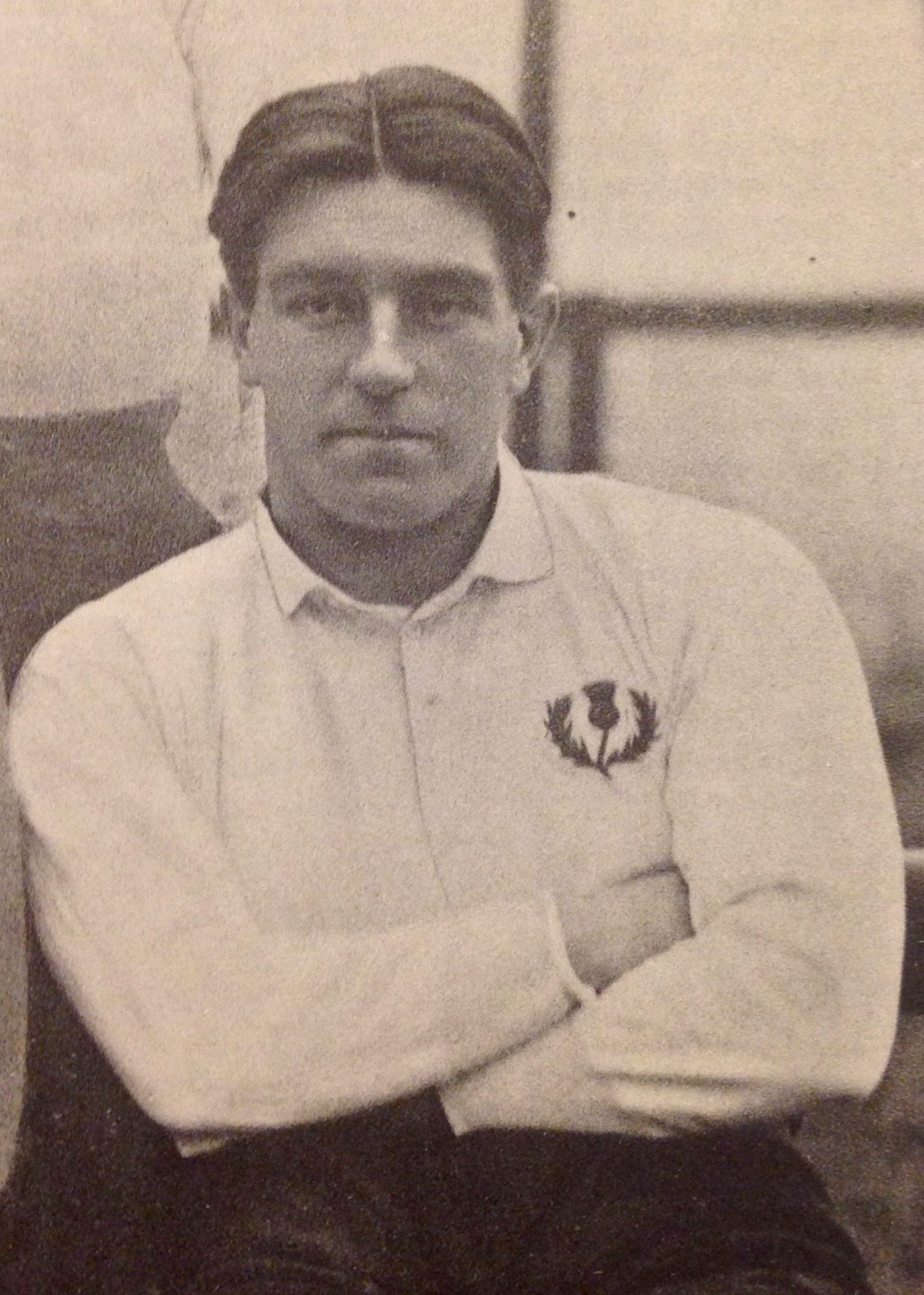
- Born: Walter Michael Dickson; 23 November 1884 Rondebosch, Cape Town, South Africa
- Died: 26 September 1915 (aged 30)
- University: University College, Oxford

Rugby union career
- Position: Fullback
Amateur team(s)
Years	Team	Apps	(Points)
1912	Oxford University		
1911–12	Barbarians	4	(4)
Senior career
Years	Team	Apps	(Points)
- London Scottish
–	Blackheath		
International career
Years	Team	Apps	(Points)
1912–1913	Scotland	7	(0)
- Military career
- Burial place: Loos Memorial (Panel 125–127); 50.461°N 2.77173°E
- Allegiance: United Kingdom
- Branch: British Army
- Rank: Lieutenant
- Unit: 11 Argyll and Sutherland Highlanders

Walter Michael "Mike" Dickson (23 November 1884 – 26 September 1915) was a rugby union player, who represented Scotland, Blackheath and Oxford. He was killed in World War I.

== Early life ==
Dickson was born in Rondebosch, Cape Colony (present-day South Africa), the younger son of Caroline Dickson.

He attended Diocesan College, SA, and University College, Oxford with a Rhodes Scholarship. At Oxford, he played in the Varsity XV of 1912 alongside Stephen Steyn, Billy Geen, Edward Fenwick Boyd, Gerard Crole and Eric Loudoun-Shand.

== Rugby career ==
Dickson played four games for the Barbarians, against Cardiff on 26 December 1911, Newport, the following day, Penarth on 5 April 1912 and Cheltenham on 9 April. He scored four points in the match against Cheltenham.

Dickson was first selected to play for Scotland in the Five Nations Championship match against France on 20 January 1912. The previous year, France had beaten Scotland 16–15 at Colombes. On this occasion, Scotland exacted a 'cruel revenge', winning the game 31–3 at Inverleith.

Dickson was playing for London Scottish in 1912 when he was selected to play against the touring South Africans.

Dickson was selected to play in the first game of 1913 on 1 January against France at the Parc des Princes. The French press wondered if the 16–15 victory of two years previous at Colombes would be repeated. 30,000 spectators turned out to watch the game. The French forwards were stronger in the scrum but Scotland's back line proved much faster and outperformed the French both in attack and defence. France scored the first try but Scotland quickly took the lead with a converted try, and a second, unconverted try consolidated the lead to 3–8 at half time. The French were unable to score again and the final result was 3–21 to the Scots. The match referee, Baxter, was impressed by the French pack but thought the French centres were responsible for the defeat, too slow to catch their opponents.

Dickson was selected to play against Wales in 1913 but it was rumoured before the game that he would withdraw.

=== International appearances ===
Opposition	Score	Result	Date	Venue	Ref(s)
France	31–3	Won	20 January 1912	Inverleith	
Wales	21–6	Lost	3 February 1912	Swansea	
England	8–3	Won	16 March 1912	Inverleith	
South Africa	0–16	Lost	23 November 1912	Inverleith	
France	3–21	Won	1 January 1913	Parc des Princes	
Wales	0–8	Lost	1 February 1913	Inverleith	
Ireland	29–14	Won	22 February 1913	Inverleith	

== Military service ==
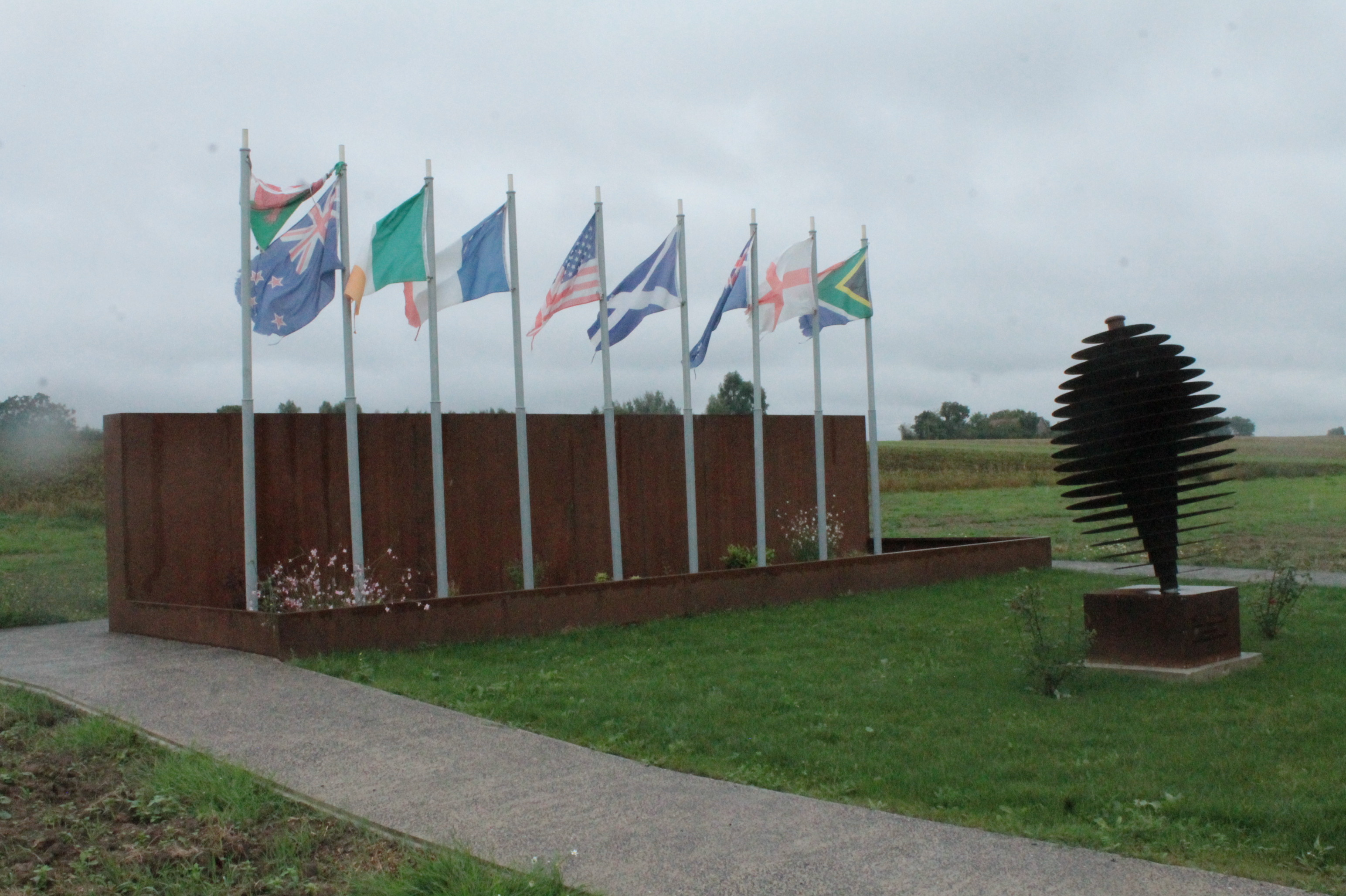
Memorial to the 133 rugby players killed in the Great War, at Fromelles

Dickson returned to South Africa after university and worked as a surveyor. When the war broke out, he returned to the UK from Durban on the SS Norman arriving in London on 4 November 1914. He enlisted in the Argyll and Sutherland Highlanders, and was commissioned second lieutenant (temporary) on 22 January 1915. He arrived in France in July 1915 and was killed in action at Loos on 26 September 1915.

He is remembered on the Loos Memorial (Panel 125–127), Pas de Calais, France. Eric Loudoun-Shand, his teammate at Oxford, said of Dickson, "He was one of the kindest and best fellows imaginable." His is also listed in the names of the 133 rugby players who were killed in the Great War on the memorial at Fromelles in north France.

== See also ==
- List of international rugby union players killed in action during the First World War
