= Tommy Thompson (rugby union) =

South African rugby union player

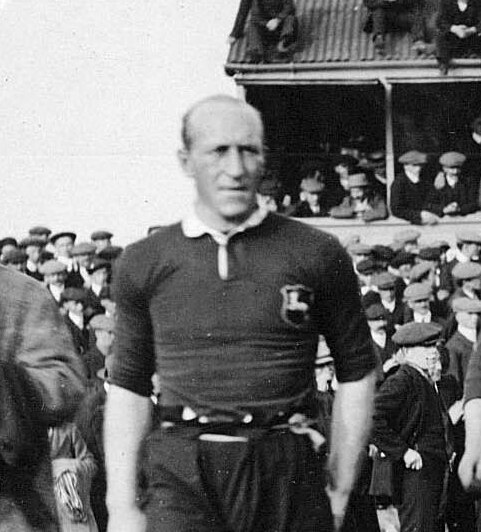
- Entering the pitch to play Cornwall. (10 October 1912)
- Born: Gerald W. Thompson; 4 October 1886
- Died: 20 June 1916 (aged 29) Kangata, German East Africa
- School: Rondebosch Boys' High School

Rugby union career
- Position: Forward
Senior career
| Years | Team | Apps | (Points) |
- Somerset West RFC
Provincial / State sides
| Years | Team | Apps | (Points) |
| 1912 | Western Province | | |
International career
| Years | Team | Apps | (Points) |
| 1912 | South Africa | 3 | |
- Military career
- Burial place: Dar es Salaam War Cemetery, Tanzania
- Allegiance: South Africa
- Branch: South African Infantry
- Conflicts: East African Campaign (World War I)

Gerald "Tommy" W. Thompson (4 October 1886 – 20 June 1916) was a South African rugby union player who played for Somerset West Rugby Club. He was selected for the provincial team of Western Province in 1912. He was selected to participate in the 1912–13 South Africa rugby tour to the British Isles and France, and was capped in three tests, against Scotland, Ireland and Wales, all in 1912. He played in a further 12 matches against club sides. He was considered one of the two best of an outstanding pack of South African forwards.

At the outbreak of the First World War, Thompson willingly volunteered for service, first in South West Africa, and then in the German East Africa campaign, with the 5th South African Infantry. He was killed in action at Kangata, taking a bullet in the neck. He is buried in the Dar es Salaam War Cemetery, near his fellow countryman and teammate Jacky Morkel, who died a few weeks before him.

== Early life ==
Tommy Thompson was born on 4 October 1886, in Carnarvon, Cape Colony, and attended Rondebosch Boys' High School.

== Rugby career ==
Thompson played rugby for Somerset West Rugby Club, and in 1912 was selected for his provincial club Western Province. He was a member of the South African rugby team that toured the British Isles and France in 1912–13. The team won all four of its international matches against the Home Nations, and against France. Thompson played against Scotland, Ireland, and Wales, and in a further twelve matches against other teams. He was considered to be one of the two best amongst the 'finest pack of forwards'. The contemporary rugby journalist and author E. H. D. Sewell recounted seeing the game against Ireland at Lansdowne Road on 23 November 1912, and said of Thompson: "I have never seen a better individual performance than his on that frost-bound pitch... Only a few have I seen to equal that all-round display". Thompson played "like one possessed" en route to a 38 point to zero victory.

=== International appearances ===
| Opposition | Score | Result | Date | Venue | Ref(s) |
|---|---|---|---|---|---|
| Scotland | 0–16 | Won | 23 November 1912 | Inverleith | |
| Ireland | 0–38 | Won | 30 November 1912 | Lansdowne Road | |
| Wales | 0–3 | Won | 14 December 1912 | Cardiff | |

== Military service ==
At the outbreak of the First World War, Thompson volunteered for service in South West Africa. At the conclusion of that campaign, he responded to the call for recruits to serve in East Africa, and was drafted into the 5th Regiment of the South African Infantry. In April 1916, Thompson contracted malaria and was hospitalised. The troops, who had to march hundreds of miles through difficult terrain, cutting their way through dense bush, suffered greatly from malaria and a shortage of rations.

On 19 June, the 5th South African Infantry, under the command of Colonel J.J. Byron, was sent in pursuit of German forces, to occupy Kangata, 8 miles south of Pongwe. (Note: McCrery (2014, p. 225) has made a transcription error, changing Kangata to Katanga.) They found the Germans entrenched in a concealed position in dense bush. During the firefight that ensued, Byron's forces took heavy losses, but sustained the attack until night, when the Germans retreated. Thompson was killed in action the following day, 20 June 1916, after a bullet pierced his neck.

Thompson is buried at Dar es Salaam War Cemetery (Grave 8. A. 3.). His grave lies near that of his fellow countryman and teammate, Jacky Morkel, who died on 15 May 1916 in East Africa.

== See also ==
- List of international rugby union players killed in action during the First World War
