= Uncle Dobbin =

South African rugby union player

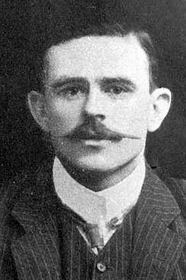
- Born: Frederick James Dobbin; 10 October 1879 Bethulie, South Africa
- Died: 5 February 1950 (aged 70) Kimberley, South Africa
- Height: 168 cm (5 ft 6 in)
- Weight: 71.2 kg (11 st 3 lb)
- School: Kimberley Boys' High School

Rugby union career
- Position: half-back
Provincial / State sides
Years	Team	Apps	(Points)
- Griqualand West
International career
Years	Team	Apps	(Points)
1903–1912	South Africa	9	(3)

Frederick James Dobbin (10 October 1879 – 5 February 1950) universally known as Uncle Dobbin was a South African rugby union player who represented South Africa on nine occasions. Dobbin played in two overseas tours and was the vice-captain to Paul Millar's 1912 team. He attended Kimberley Boys' High School in Kimberley, Northern Cape South Africa.

== Rugby career ==
Dobbin was first selected for the national rugby team in 1903, in the First Test of the 1903 British Isles tour of South Africa. South Africa had a poor international record to date, having played seven matches, all against the British Isles, and had won only one game. The 1903 tourists had a difficult campaign before meeting the South African national team, having lost seven of the 16 games against the invitational county and regional teams. Dobbin was brought into the South African team for the First Test, partnered at half-back with seasoned international Jackie Powell. The game was very tight, with both teams scoring two converted tries to leave the final score 10-10. Dobbin celebrated his first cap by scoring one of the two South African tries, converted by Fairy Heatlie.

Sporting positions
Preceded by Billy Millar	Springbok Captain; 1912	Succeeded by Theo Pienaar
