= Robert Burgess (rugby union) =

Irish rugby union player (1890–1915)

- Born: Robert Balderston Burgess; 25 December 1890
- Died: 9 December 1915 (aged 24) Armentières, France
- University: Trinity College, Dublin
- Occupation: Barrister

Rugby union career
- Position: Forward
Amateur team(s)
Years	Team	Apps	(Points)
1913–1914	Dublin University Football Club		
Senior career
Years	Team	Apps	(Points)
1913	Barbarians	1	(0)
International career
Years	Team	Apps	(Points)
1912	Ireland	1	(0)
- Military career
- Burial place: Bailleul Communal Cemetery Extension Nord (II.B.63), Bailleul, France; 50.737761°N 2.742365°E
- Allegiance: United Kingdom
- Branch: British Army
- Rank: Captain
- Unit: Royal Engineers
- Memorials: Reading room, Trinity College, Dublin

Robert Balderston Burgess (25 December 1890 – 9 December 1915) was a rugby union player, who represented Ireland. He died at Armentières during the First World War.

== Early life ==
Burgess was born on 25 December 1890 to Henry Burgess, a railway manager, and his wife Agnes. He went to Portora Royal School, where he played rugby and was reputedly the best forward in the team. From there he went to Trinity College, Dublin.

== Rugby career ==
Burgess was fast for a forward, and a strong tackler. He was selected to play for Ireland for a single match, on 30 November 1912 against the touring South Africans, which the visitors won 0–38. From 1913 to 1914, Burgess was playing for Dublin University Football Club and was the club's honorary secretary. He was invited to play for the Barbarians, alongside Alexander Jackson, the Irish centre, and former England captain Edgar Mobbs, against Newport RFC on 27 December 1913, losing 14–0.

=== International appearance ===
Opposition	Score	Result	Date	Venue	Ref(s)
South Africa	0–38	Lost	30 November 1912	Lansdowne Road	

== Military service and death ==
Soon after the First World War began, in November 1914, Burgess was commissioned in the Royal Army Service Corps. He was soon promoted to captain in January 1915 and served with the Royal Engineers. On 9 December 1915, he was hit by a shell while cycling down the rue de Dunkerque in Armentières, northern France, and died at a casualty clearing station. He was the fourth Irish international rugby player to be killed in action in the First World War. His commanding officer said of him:

The late Captain Burgess was an excellent officer, always ready for his duty day and night, and was the most popular officer in his section.

He is buried at the Bailleul Communal Cemetery Extension Nord (II.B.63), and is commemorated at the entrance to the reading room at Trinity College, Dublin.
