= Bill Cotty =

South Africa international rugby union player

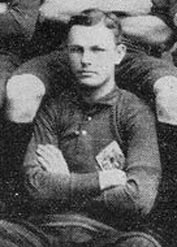
- Born: William Alfred Henry Cotty; 24 February 1875 Kimberley, South Africa
- Died: 6 September 1928 (aged 53) Kimberley, South Africa
- School: Kimberley Boys' High School

Rugby union career
- Position: Scrum-half
Provincial / State sides
Years	Team	Apps	(Points)
- Griqualand West
- Correct as of 19 July 2010
International career
Years	Team	Apps	(Points)
1896	South Africa	1	(0)
- Correct as of 19 July 2010

William Alfred Henry Cotty (24 February 1875 – 6 September 1928) was a South African international rugby union player. Born in Kimberley, he attended Kimberley Boys' High School before playing provincial rugby for Griqualand West (now known as Griquas). He made his only Test appearance for South Africa during Great Britain's 1896 tour. He played as a scrum-half in the 3rd Test of the series, a 9–3 loss in Kimberley.

During the Siege of Kimberley, Cotty fought as a trooper in the Kimberley Light Horse, a colonial unit of the Boer War of 1899–1902. This is unsurprising as the family were very close to Cecil Rhodes. It was Rhodes who had sponsored the raising of this new regiment, the Kimberley Light Horse, in anticipation of conflict with the Boers and shortly prior to the Siege of Kimberley. The Kimberley regiment is one of only two regiments of the British Empire holding as a Battle Honour the defence of its own city - in this instance Defence of Kimberley. Bill Cotty received the Defence of Kimberley clasp and the Kimberley Star for his service.

Cotty died in 1928, in Kimberley, at the age of 53.
