= Ian Kirkpatrick (rugby union, born 1930) =

South African rugby union player

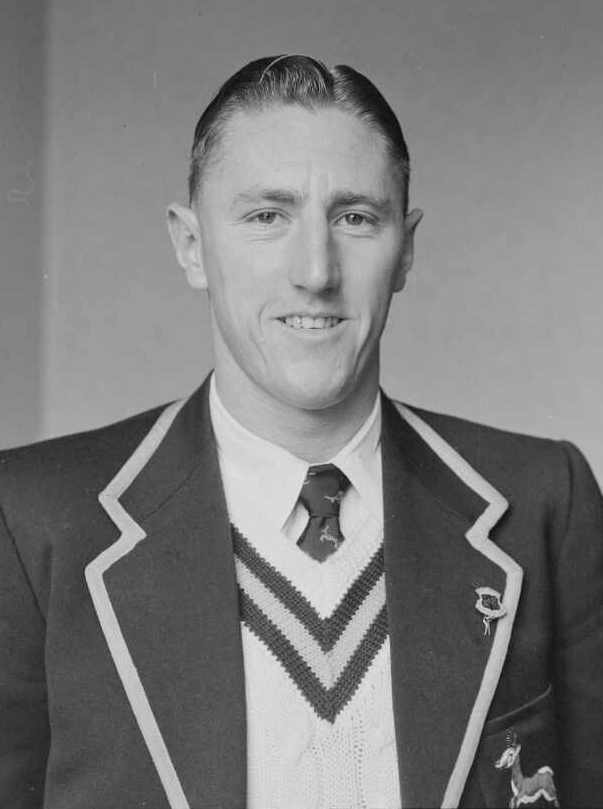
- Kirkpatrick in New Zealand in 1956
- Born: Alexander Ian Kirkpatrick; 25 July 1930 Bloemfontein, South Africa
- Died: 18 November 2012 (aged 82) Somerset West, South Africa
- School: Kimberley Boys' High School

Rugby union career
- Position: Centre
Provincial / State sides
Years	Team	Apps	(Points)
- Griqualand West
International career
Years	Team	Apps	(Points)
1953–61	South Africa	13	(0)

Alexander Ian Kirkpatrick (25 July 1930 – 18 November 2012) was a South African rugby union player, who played international rugby for his country on 13 occasions from 1953 to 1961. In his home country he is best known as a coach, where he led Griqualand West to victory in the Currie Cup in 1970, and in 1978 took on the role as the director of coaching for the South African Rugby Board.
