= Boetie McHardy =

South African rugby union player

- Full name: Evelyn Edgar McHardy
- Born: 11 June 1890 Bloemfontein, South Africa
- Died: 13 December 1959 (aged 69) Bloemfontein, South Africa

Rugby union career
- Position: Wing
International career
Years	Team	Apps	(Points)
1912–13	South Africa	5	(18)

Evelyn Edgar "Boetie" McHardy (11 June 1890 – 13 December 1959) was a South African rugby union international capped in five Test matches for the Springboks on the 1912–13 tour of Europe.

Born in Bloemfontein and a product of Grey College, McHardy was a speedy winger who won the sprint and 220 yard championships of Orange Free State. He was the first Springbok to come out of the province and also had the distinction of scoring South Africa's first Test hat-trick, against Ireland at Lansdowne Road in 1912. The other Springboks winger Jan Stegmann also scored three tries in the match, but McHardy had completed his by half-time.

== See also ==
- List of South Africa national rugby union players
