= Fred Perrett =

Wales international rugby union & league footballer

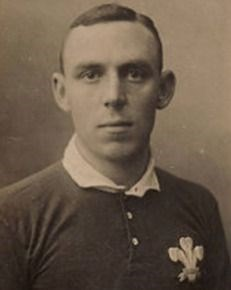
- Born: Fred Leonard Perrett; 9 May 1891 Briton Ferry, Neath Port Talbot, Wales
- Died: 1 December 1918 (aged 27) Boulogne, France

Rugby union career
- Position: Prop
Amateur team(s)
Years	Team	Apps	(Points)
–	Briton Ferry RFC		
–	Aberavon RFC		
–	Neath RFC		
International career
Years	Team	Apps	(Points)
1912-1913	Wales	5	(0)
- Rugby league career

Playing information
- Position: Forward
Club
Years	Team	Pld	T	G	FG	P
1913–14	Leeds
1914–16	Hull FC
	Total	0	0	0	0	0
- Military career
- Allegiance: United Kingdom
- Branch: British Army
- Service years: 1916-18
- Rank: second lieutenant
- Units: Welsh Guards; Royal Welsh Fusiliers
- Conflicts: World War I

Fred Leonard Perrett (9 May 1891 – 1 December 1918) was a Welsh international rugby union prop who played club rugby for Neath. He won five caps for Wales, and in his first international game faced the touring South Africans.

== Rugby career ==
Perrett originally played rugby for his local club Briton Ferry before eventually playing for Neath. While a member of Neath he earned his first Welsh cap against the touring South Africa team. Wales ran the South Africans close, but lost to a single penalty kick.

Perrett was reselected for Wales in the 1913 Five Nations Championship, one of only two Welsh players to appear in all four matches of the campaign; the other being Neath teammate Glyn Stephens. The two complemented each other well, especially during line outs. The Welsh team lost the first game against England, but won the final three games to finish second. Perrett may have been selected for further Wales matches, but turned professional at the end of the 1912/13 season, joining rugby league team Leeds, making his début on 6 September 1913, he later joined Hull FC.

Perrett's league career was cut short by the outbreak of World War I. He joined the Welsh Guards, and served in France from 19 February 1916. He was subsequently commissioned as a second lieutenant, and transferred to the 17th Battalion of the Royal Welsh Fusiliers with seniority from 27 June 1917. He was seriously injured and died of his wounds in a casualty clearing station almost a month after the Armistice. He is buried at Terlincthun British Cemetery at Wimille in France. Perrett is often left out of lists of the Welsh international war dead due to his supposed defection to the professional game.

== International matches played ==
Wales

- England 1913
- France 1913
- Ireland 1913
- Scotland 1913
- South Africa 1912

== Bibliography ==
- Billot, John (1974). Springboks in Wales. Ferndale: Ron Jones Publications.
- Godwin, Terry (1984). The International Rugby Championship 1883–1983. London: Willows Books. ISBN 0-00-218060-X.
- Griffiths, Terry (1987). The Phoenix Book of International Rugby Records. London: Phoenix House. ISBN 0-460-07003-7.
- Smith, David; Williams, Gareth (1980). Fields of Praise: The Official History of The Welsh Rugby Union. Cardiff: University of Wales Press. ISBN 0-7083-0766-3.
