= Harry Hiams =

Wales international rugby union player (1886–1954)

- Born: Harry Hiams
- Died: Swansea. Wales

Rugby union career
- Position: Forward
Amateur team(s)
Years	Team	Apps	(Points)
1905-1912	Swansea RFC		
- London Welsh RFC
1912-?	Llanelli RFC		
- Aberavon RFC
International career
Years	Team	Apps	(Points)
1912	Wales	2	(0)

Harry Hiams (1886 – 10 April 1954) was a Welsh international forward who played club rugby for Swansea and Llanelli. He won two caps for Wales and played for Llanelli against the touring South Africans. During the First World War, Hiams served with the Royal Field Artillery.

== Rugby career ==
Hiams joined Swansea in 1905, but it wasn't until 1912 that Hiams was selected to play for Wales. He turned out on 9 March 1912 against Ireland at the Balmoral Showgrounds, in a match Wales lost 12–5. Two weeks later he played his second and last game for Wales, this time at Rodney Parade against France. Although Wales won the game, it was seen as far too close a match and eight members of the Welsh team played their last Five Nations Championship game.

In the second half of 1912, Haines switched from Swansea to Llanelli, and on 17 October, he faced the 1912 touring South African team as part of an invitational Glamorgan XV. It was a humiliating match for the Glamorgan side losing 35–3, the largest winning margin for a touring side against a Welsh team. Two days later Hiams was the only international player in the Llanelli team to face the Springboks and after the previous match little was expected of the Welsh club side. When Hiams scored a dropped goal from 45 yards during the match, play had to be suspended as fans raced onto the pitch to congratulate him. Although Llanelli lost 8–7, the closeness and exciting match-play gave the Scarlets and Hiams a taste of glory. Hiams was dropped for the Wales game against the South Africans as the selectors decided they needed more heavy scrummagers.

=== International matches played ===
Wales

- France 1912
- Ireland 1912

== Bibliography ==
- Billot, John (1974). Springboks in Wales. Ferndale, Glamorgan: Ron Jones Publications.
- Smith, David; Williams, Gareth (1980). Fields of Praise: The Official History of The Welsh Rugby Union. Cardiff: University of Wales Press. ISBN 0-7083-0766-3.
