= Johnnie Morgan =

Welsh rugby player (1892–1947)

- Born: John Lewis Morgan; 2 October 1892 Patagonia, Argentina
- Died: 7 July 1947 (aged 54) Campo Largo, Chaco, Argentina

Rugby union career
- Position: Flanker
Amateur team(s)
Years	Team	Apps	(Points)
- Llandovery College
- Llanelli Orinetal Stars
?-1913	Llanelli RFC		
International career
Years	Team	Apps	(Points)
1912-13	Wales	2	(0)

John Lewis Morgan (23 October 1892 - 7 July 1947) was a Welsh international forward who played club rugby for Llandovery College and Llanelli. He won two caps for Wales before returning to live in his home country of Argentina. He is the only Wales rugby union player to date born in Patagonia.

== Personal history ==
Morgan was born in Alejandra, Argentina in 1892. He moved to Wales as a child and was educated at Carmarthen Grammar School and later at Llandovery College. He was a talented all-round sportsperson who played as a hooker for the college during the winter and was an important member of the cricket XI during the summer months. After leaving college he found employment as an engineer at the Thomas and Clement Foundry in Llanelli. In 1913 he returned to Argentina where he became a farmer in his birth town of Alejandra. In 192 he moved to Campo Largo where he worked as a police officer. He died in Argentina in 1947.

== Rugby career ==
Morgan is initially recorded playing rugby when he was a student at Llandovery College. On moving to Llanelli he joined local side the Oriental Stars, where he was soon spotted by Llanelli RFC and given a place in their team. While at Llanelli Morgan faced his first international opponents, selected for his club against the second touring South Africans. It was a close match with the tourists winning 8-7. Morgan did enough to impress and was selected for his first international cap for Wales, facing the same South African team. In another tough match Morgan again found himself on the losing side this time the result was 3-0. Morgan played one last match for his adopted country when he faced England in the 1913 Five Nations Championship.

=== International matches played ===
Wales

- South Africa 1912
- England 1913

== Bibliography ==
- Hughes, Gareth (1986). The Scarlets: A History of Llanelli Rugby Club. Llanelli: Llanelli Borough Council. ISBN 0906821053.
- Jenkins, John M.; Pierce, Duncan; Auty, Timothy (1991). Who's Who of Welsh International Rugby Players. Wrexham: Bridge Books. ISBN 1-872424-10-4.
- Smith, David; Williams, Gareth (1980). Fields of Praise: The Official History of The Welsh Rugby Union. Cardiff: University of Wales Press. ISBN 0-7083-0766-3.
