= 1973 Japan rugby union tour of Wales, England and France =

Summary
P	W	D	L
Total
11	2	0	9
Test match
3	0	0	3
Opponent
P	W	D	L
Wales XV
1	0	0	1
England U23
1	0	0	1
France
1	0	0	1

The 1973 Japan rugby union tour of England, Wales and France was a series of eleven matches played by the Japan national rugby union team in Wales, England and France in September and October 1973. The Japanese team won only of two of their matches and lost the other nine. Neither Wales nor France awarded full international caps for their games against Japan.

== Matches ==
Scores and results list Japan's points tally first.

Opposing Team	For	Against	Date	Venue
East Glamorgan	11	23	September 22	Graig Park, Penygraig
Monmouthshire	16	26	September 26	Pontypool Park, Pontypool
West Glamorgan	6	19	September 29	The Gnoll, Neath
Western Counties (Wales)	12	9	October 2	Stradey Park, Llanelli
Wales XV	14	62	October 6	Cardiff Arms Park, Cardiff
Midland Counties (England)	6	10	October 9	Welford Road, Leicester
England Under-23	19	23	October 13	Twickenham, London
French Regional XV	19	51	October 17	Avignon
French Regional XV	18	29	October 21	Perpignan
French Regional XV	19	8	October 24	Brive
France	18	30	October 27	Bordeaux

== In popular culture ==
The good-natured and friendly mood of the tour was captured by Max Boyce in the song "Asso Asso Yogoshi" on the album Live at Treorchy.
