= Horace Thomas =

Wales international rugby union footballer (1890–1916)

- Born: Horace Wyndham Thomas; 28 July 1890 Bridgend, Wales
- Died: 3 September 1916 (aged 26) Guillemont, France
- School: Monmouth School
- University: King's College, Cambridge

Rugby union career
- Position: Fly half
Amateur team(s)
Years	Team	Apps	(Points)
- Cambridge University R.U.F.C.
- Swansea RFC
- Blackheath F.C.
1911-1912	Barbarian F.C.		
–	Calcutta Football Club		
International career
Years	Team	Apps	(Points)
1912-1913	Wales	2	(0)

Not to be confused with American lawyer and public official Horace Holmes Thomas

Horace Wyndham Thomas (28 July 1890 – 3 September 1916) was a Welsh international rugby union fly-half who played club rugby for Swansea. He won just two caps for Wales, and was one of thirteen Welsh internationals to die in conflict during World War I.

== Rugby career ==
Thomas was born to a rector from Bettws, Bridgend, but moved to England when he gained a place at King's College, Cambridge after winning a choral scholarship. At Cambridge, Thomas studied History and was a keen sportsman. He played cricket for the Cambridge seconds, represented the athletics team and won a Blue at rugby. While playing for Cambridge he was first selected to represent Wales in 1912 in a game against the touring South African team. When Thomas was selected for the South African game he was chosen against a stipulated agreement, that stated that no Welsh player could be chosen to represent the country if they played within the London area, but did not play for London Welsh. Eight selectors travelled to Cambridge to watch Thomas play in a Varsity match which saw Cambridge victorious for the first time in seven years. The Thursday before the game, Thomas was named in the squad at a conference at the Queens's Hotel in Cardiff. Wales lost the game 3–0, but at one point after Thomas attempted a drop goal, the crowd mistakenly believing that the kick had succeeded, cheered thinking that Thomas had won the game for Wales.

Thomas would play only one more game for Wales, under the captaincy of Tommy Vile, in the team's opening match of the 1913 Five Nations Championship against England. Wales lost the game and Thomas ended his international rugby career without a win. Thomas left Britain to take up a post in Calcutta. While in Calcutta he joined and later became captain of the Calcutta Football Club.

=== International matches played ===
Wales

- England 1913
- South Africa 1912

== Later life ==
In 1916 Thomas volunteered to serve his country in World War I. He reached the rank of Second Lieutenant within the Rifle Brigade and was killed in battle at Hamel, north of the river Ancre, in September 1916. His body was never recovered and he is commemorated at the Thiepval Memorial.

== Bibliography ==
- Billot, John (1974). Springboks in Wales. Ferndale: Ron Jones Publications.
- Smith, David; Williams, Gareth (1980). Fields of Praise: The Official History of The Welsh Rugby Union. Cardiff: University of Wales Press. ISBN 0-7083-0766-3.
