= Fred Birt =

Wales international rugby union player

- Born: Frederick William Birt; 10 November 1886 Newport, Wales
- Died: 5 July 1956 (aged 69) Beaufort, Ebbw Vale, Wales

Rugby union career
- Position: Centre
Amateur team(s)
Years	Team	Apps	(Points)
- London Welsh RFC
1906-1922	Newport RFC		
–	Monmouthshire		
International career
Years	Team	Apps	(Points)
1911-1913	Wales	7	(7)

Fred Birt (10 November 1886 – 5 July 1956) was a Welsh international, rugby union centre who played club rugby for Newport and county rugby with Monmouthshire. He won seven caps for Wales but is most notable for his outstanding performance against the 1912 touring South African team for Newport. He was also a member of the Wales bowls team.

== Rugby career ==
Birt had an early connection with the game of rugby, and as a youth was a ball boy for Welsh rugby legend, Arthur Gould at Newport. He joined the club as a senior and was a member of the First XV in the 1906/07 season. In 1912 Birt was part of the Newport team that faced the touring South African side. The Springboks match took place on 24 October and Birt was central to the result. The Springboks played 27 games on the tour and only lost three, the first was to Newport. In the first half Birt kicked a drop goal, and the South African Meintjies shook his hand after he did so. In the second half the Springboks came back, scoring a try, but failed to complete the conversion leaving Newport still a point ahead. Newport won the game when after the Welsh kicked the ball towards the South African posts that van der Hoff failed to smother; Birt pounced on the loose ball and not only scored a try, but also completed the conversion. Newport won 9-3, all nine points scored by Fred Birt.

Birt's first international appearance for Wales was in a win against England on 28 January 1911. In the game at St Helens and under the captaincy of Billy Trew, Birt scored his first points for Wales with a penalty goal. Birt scored his only other Welsh points with a drop goal against Scotland in 1912, and ended his international career a year later against England.

=== International matches played ===
Wales

- England 1911, 1912, 1913
- Ireland 1912,
- Scotland 1911, 1912
- South Africa 1912

== Bibliography ==
- Smith, David; Williams, Gareth (1980). Fields of Praise: The Official History of The Welsh Rugby Union. Cardiff: University of Wales Press. ISBN 0-7083-0766-3.
