= Rees Stephens =

British Lions & Wales international rugby union footballer

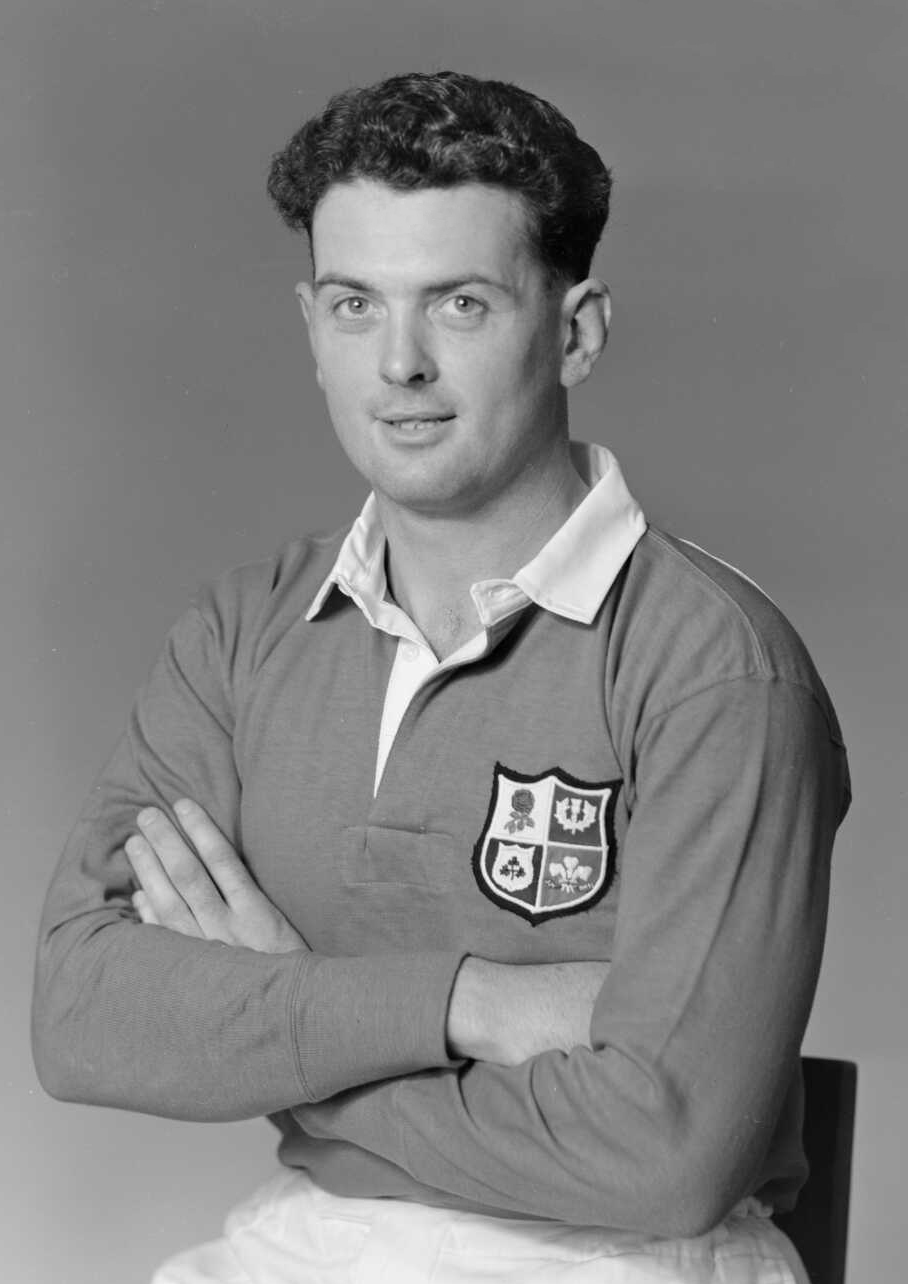
- Stephens in New Zealand in 1950
- Born: John Rees Glyn Stephens; 16 April 1922 Neath, Wales
- Died: 4 February 1998 (aged 75) Swansea, Wales
- School: Llandovery College
- Notable relative: Glyn Stephens (father)
- Occupation: miner

Rugby union career
- Position(s): No. 8 Lock
Amateur team(s)
| Years | Team | Apps | (Points) |
- Tonmawr RFC
- Neath RFC
| – | Barbarian F.C. | | |
International career
| Years | Team | Apps | (Points) |
| 1947–1957 | Wales | 32 | (8) |
| 1950 | British Lions | 2 | (0) |

John Rees Glyn Stephens (16 April 1922 – 4 February 1998) was a Welsh international rugby union player who played club rugby for Tonmawr RFC and Neath. He won 32 caps for Wales and was selected to play in the British Lions on the 1950 tour of Australia and New Zealand. He was the son of a past Welsh rugby international, Glyn Stephens, who was also president of the Welsh Rugby Union.

Born in 1922 in Neath, Stephens played under-14s rugby for Wales and then after being accepted to Llandovery College, he played for Wales Secondary Schools. During the Second World War Stephens played scratch rugby for many clubs while working as a miner. Initially a number eight, Stephens would later switch to the second row.

== International career ==
Stephens made his official debut for the senior Wales team against England in 1947 under the captaincy of Haydn Tanner. Stephens had turned out against the French team in the 1945/46 'Victory' internationals, but his first capped games were during the 1947 Five Nations Championship. The 1947 England game at the Cardiff Arms Park saw Wales lose 9–6 though Stephens did manage to score a try in the game, one of only two he would manage in his long career. During the 1947/48 season, Stephens lost his position to the returning Les Manfield, but Stephens was back for Wales's final game of the 1948 Championship game against Ireland. Over the next two years he would drop in and out of the Welsh squad, often through injury sometimes through selection choices, but in 1950 he and Bleddyn Williams were chosen to represent the British Lions of their tour of Australia and New Zealand.

=== International matches played ===
Wales

- England 1947, 1952, 1953, 1954, 1955, 1957
- France 1947, 1949, 1951, 1952, 1953, 1955, 1956, 1957
- Ireland 1947, 1948, 1949, 1952, 1953, 1954, 1955, 1956, 1957
- New Zealand 1953
- Scotland 1947, 1949, 1952, 1953, 1955, 1956, 1957
- South Africa 1951

=== British Lions ===
During the 1950 Lions tour, Stephens was chosen for the opening match against a joint Tasman regional team. During the game he injured his shoulder and would not be fit enough to play until the eleventh game of the tour. Although he played in two Australian tests, Stephens was not deemed to be fit enough to face the New Zealand All Blacks.

- Australia 1950
