= Saturday Knight =

South African rugby union footballer (1885–1946)

- Born: Arnold Sedgfield Knight; 16 December 1885 Burgersdorp, Cape Colony
- Died: 1 July 1946 (aged 60) Pumala Farm, White River, Transvaal

Rugby union career
- Position: Forward
International career
Years	Team	Apps	(Points)
1912–1913	South Africa	5	(0)

Arnold Sedgfield "Saturday" Knight (16 December 1885 - 1 July 1946) was a South African international rugby union player.

Knight, who played his club rugby with the Pirates, represented Transvaal in provincial fixtures. He was a member of the South African side which toured the British Isles, France and Ireland in 1912/13. A forward, he appeared in all five Test matches, making his debut against Scotland and then playing Ireland, Wales, England and France.

He also played a first-class cricket match, for a "Rest of South Africa" team, against Wanderers in 1908. He scored five in his first innings and 15 in the second.
