= Rudolph Bigalke =

South African zoologist

Rudolph Bigalke (2 October 1896 – 11 June 1989) was the third director of the National Zoological Gardens of South Africa (South Africa), from 1927 to 1962.

== Early life and education ==
Bigalke grew up and went to school in Kimberley, attending the Kimberley Boys' High School (matriculating as a Dux Medallist in 1914). He subsequently studied at Rhodes University, and at the University of Berlin (1923–1926) where he was awarded his PhD.

== Pretoria Zoo ==
One of the most noteworthy expansion projects under Bigalke's directorship of the National Zoological Gardens of South Africa was the creation of the mountain area exhibits to the north of the zoo. These habitats today house Bengal tigers, lions, urials and Nubian ibex. It has been remarked that the establishment of these large enclosures marked the beginning of the end of small cages for zoo animals.
