= Kimberley Girls' High School =

Girls' High School in Kimberley

Coordinates: 28°44′51″S 24°46′42″E

Information
- Established: 1887; 139 years ago
- Gender: Girls
- Website: kimberleygirlshigh.co.za

Kimberley Girls' High School is a high school located on Elsmere Road in Kimberley, Northern Cape, South Africa. It is over a hundred years old and has close affiliation with Kimberley Boys' High School and Kimberley Junior School.

== History ==
Kimberley Girls' High School was founded on 12 April 1887 in Woodley Street Hall. The Girls' High and Boys' High Schools, jointly known as the Kimberley Undenominational Schools, occupied separate wings of the building in Lanyon Terrace until 1913 when they moved to their present sites.

== See also ==
- Kimberley Boys' High School
