= Thomas Hollingdale =

Wales international rugby union player (1900–1978)

Tom Hollingdale
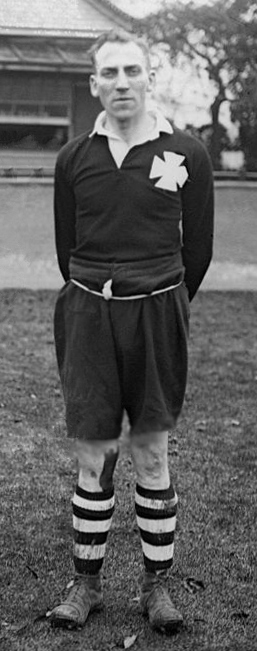
- Hollingdale in 1928
- Born: Thomas Henry Hollingdale; 12 November 1900 Waunarlwydd, Wales
- Died: 14 April 1978 (aged 77) Hounslow, England
- School: Waunarlwydd School; Gowerton County School
- Notable relative: Bert Hollingdale (brother – also capped for Wales)
- Occupation: cleric

Rugby union career
- Position: Number eight
Amateur team(s)
Years	Team	Apps	(Points)
- Waunarlwydd RFC
–	Gowerton RFC		
–	Briton Ferry RFC		
–	Ammanford RFC		
–	Neath RFC		
–	Neath Borough Police RFC		
–	Glamorgan County RFC		
International career
Years	Team	Apps	(Points)
1927–1930	Wales	6	(0)

The Rev Thomas "Tom" Henry Hollingdale AKC (12 November 1900 – 14 April 1978), was a Church of England cleric and Wales international rugby player.

== Rugby career ==
Thomas Hollingdale was born in Waunarlwydd on 12 November 1900. He attended Waunarlwydd School and Gowerton County School. He played his club rugby for Ammanford and Neath and captained Glamorganshire. In September 1927, he played for a combined Aberavon and Neath XV against the touring New South Wales Waratahs and a few weeks later, played for Wales against the Waratahs – this is now treated as a full international. He was capped in total six times for Wales in the late 1920s. On 26 November 1930 he played for a Welsh International XV against Reading, but never again represented his country.

=== International matches played ===
- Australia 1927
- France 1928
- Scotland 1928
- Ireland 1928
- England 1928, 1930

== Subsequent career ==
Hollingdale was employed in the local steel works and later as a policeman (PC number 22 on the Neath Police Force), before studying theology at King's College London, where he became an Associate of King's College (AKC). Following his ordination, he worked as a curate in Upminster and subsequently as vicar of the parish of Stratford in East London. From 1948 to 1959 he was vicar of St Peter's, Colchester — a living controlled by the Simeon Trust. During this time he contributed articles to rugby magazines and other publications and was President of Colchester RFC. Thereafter, he became rector of the parish of Copford, Essex until he retired in 1968.

He married Leah Williams in April 1921 at Swansea and they had three daughters – Joan, Mercia and Muriel (who was known by her second name, Shirley).

He died on 14 April 1978 in Hounslow.
