= Bert Hollingdale =

Welsh rugby union player (1889–1961)

- Born: Bertie George Hollingdale; 1889 Swansea, Wales
- Died: 11 February 1961 (aged 71–72) Waunarlwydd, Wales
- Notable relative: Tom Hollingdale (brother)

Rugby union career
- Position: Forward
Amateur team(s)
Years	Team	Apps	(Points)
- Swansea RFC
International career
Years	Team	Apps	(Points)
1913-1914	Wales	2	(0)

Bert Hollingdale (1889–11 February 1961) was a Welsh international rugby union forward who played club rugby for Swansea Rugby Football Club and was capped for Wales on two occasions. His younger brother, Tom also played rugby, though he played for rival club Neath and had a more successful international career, representing Wales six times.

Hollingdale made his Welsh international debut on 14 December 1912 against the touring South African team. He would face the South Africans twelve days later as part of the Swansea team that achieved a tight victory over the tourists. His second and final cap was during the 1913 Five Nations Championship when he was selected to face England. The Welsh team lost badly, and Hollingdale was one of eight players from the side that would not represent Wales again.

International matches played Wales

- England 1913
- South Africa 1912

== Bibliography ==
- Smith, David; Williams, Gareth (1980). Fields of Praise: The Official History of The Welsh Rugby Union. Cardiff: University of Wales Press. ISBN 0-7083-0766-3.
