= D'Arcy Patterson =

Rugby union player from Northern Ireland

- Full name: Richard d'Arcy Patterson
- Born: 23 October 1889 Belfast, Ireland
- Died: 24 November 1930 (aged 41) Tramore, County Waterford, Ireland

Rugby union career
- Position: Forward
International career
Years	Team	Apps	(Points)
1912–13	Ireland	8	(3)

Richard d'Arcy Patterson (23 October 1889 — 24 November 1930) was an Irish international rugby union player.

Born in Belfast, Patterson played locally for the Malone RFC. He spent some time in England early in his career, appearing for Manchester and Liverpool, then later played in Leinster with Wanderers, from where he gained his Ireland caps. In 1912 and 1913, Patterson was capped eight times as a forward for the national team.

Patterson was employed as an engineer for Great Southern Railways and served as president of Waterford City RFC, a position he held at the time of his death in 1930, from natural causes at age 41.

== See also ==
- List of Ireland national rugby union players
