= Sep Ledger =

South Africa international rugby union player

Septimus "Sep" Heyns Ledger (29 April 1889 – 13 April 1917) was a South African rugby union player from Kimberley, South Africa. He was killed in World War I, in Arras, France while serving as a sergeant in the South African Infantry. He was a clerk by profession.

Ledger took part in the 1912–13 South Africa rugby union tour. He was awarded four caps, the first against Scotland where he scored a try. His club team was Griqualand West.

== See also ==
- List of international rugby union players killed in action during the First World War
