= Billy Millar (rugby union) =

South African rugby union player

- Born: William Alexander Millar; 6 November 1883 Bedford, Cape Colony
- Died: 18 March 1949 (aged 65) Paarl, Cape Province, Union of South Africa
- Height: 5 ft 10 in (178 cm)
- Weight: 13 st 2 lb (184 lb; 83 kg)

Rugby union career
- Position: Forward
International career
Years	Team	Apps	(Points)
1906–13	South Africa	6	(6)
- Correct as of 15 October 2007
Refereeing career
Years	Competition		Apps
- Test Matches

William Alexander Millar (6 November 1883 – 3 March 1949) was a South African Rugby union player. He was captain during South Africa's Tour of Great Britain in 1906.

== Personal life ==
Millar was born in 1884 in Bedford. Millar was 5 feet 10 inches in height, and weighed 13 stone 2 pounds. He played a little football at the South African College in 1899. He was an amateur boxer, having won the heavyweight championship of the Western Province.

== Career ==
He did not start playing the game again till 1903. He was badly wounded during the Boer war, and, on returning to Cape Town to convalesce, his recreations were walking, mountain climbing and shooting. These exercises gave him stamina and strength for Rugby football.

In 1903 he started in the second string of the Gardens, but joined the first later that season. In 1904-6 he steadily improved, till in the last season he was recognised as one of the best forwards in the Western Province. He was selected for the Western Province in the Currie Cup Tournament at Johannesburg. His omission from the original list of those selected caused some surprise, but Bertie Mosenthal's inability to make the trip gave him a place as first reserve.

== See also ==
- South African rugby union captains

Sporting positions
Preceded by Dougie Morkel	Springbok Captain; 1910–1913	Succeeded by Uncle Dobbin
