= Kimberley Boys' High School =

Coordinates: 28°44′56″S 24°46′11″E

- Kimberley, Northern Cape; South Africa

Information
- Type: Public & Boarding
- Motto: Per Labores Ad Honores
- Religious affiliation: Undenominational
- Established: 12 April 1887; 139 years ago
- Locale: Suburban
- Sister school: Kimberley Girls' High School
- Headmaster: Mr Xolile Taba
- Grades: 8–12
- Gender: Male
- Colors: Black and White
- Rival: CBC
- Website: www.kbhs.co.za

Kimberley Boys' High School is a state secondary school or high school situated adjacent to the Honoured Dead Memorial, in the arc between Dalham and Memorial Roads, Kimberley, Northern Cape, South Africa – a site it has occupied since January 1914. The school was founded, along with what would become Kimberley Girls' High School, in 1887, under the name Kimberley Public Undenominational Schools. In July 1970 it gave rise to Kimberley Boys’ Junior School which in turn united with Belgravia Junior School in January 1977 to become what is today Kimberley Junior School.

== History ==
Kimberley Boys' High School traces its origins to the establishment of the Kimberley Undenominational Schools (a Boys' School and a Girls' School), opened at the Woodley Street Schoolroom on 12 April 1887. The Boys' and Girls' Schools occupied separate wings of a purpose-built school in Lanyon Terrace in Kimberley from 1888 until 1913, when Kimberley Girls' High School moved to its present site in Elsmere Road. Kimberley Boys' High School moved to its present site in January 1914.

=== Headmasters ===
Episodes in the school’s history have been recounted in Leslie Moult's 1987 centenary book, K.H.Story: a history of Kimberley Boys' High School, relative to the terms of successive headmasters:

- W.A. Norrie, 1887–1892
- L.C. Wilkes, 1893–1898
- H.C. Nottcutt

, 1899–1903

- A.H.J. Bourne, 1904–1917
- O.J.S. Satchel, 1918–1926
- S.D. Stoops, 1928–1941
- L.M. Dugmore, 1942–1957
- Alan Barker, 1958
- Herbert Pringle Gordon, 1959–1967
- R.C.H. "Bob" Hart, 1968–1973
- Alan S. Powell, 1974–1983
- T.J. Webster, from 1984
- Hennie van der Mescht
- John Lobban
- S Harward
- Dudley W Daniels 2003-2012
- Graham R. Steele 2013-2019
- W Sell 2019-2020 (Acting)
- Xolile Taba 2021–present

=== Impacts of War ===
Many of the boys of this school volunteered to serve in the armed forces in World War I, World War II and the Korean War, some serving with distinction. A Memorial Library was built in honour of those who died. Conscripted school-leavers in the second half of the twentieth century acquitted themselves equally well in the South African Defence Force.

=== Centenary ===
Kimberley Boys’ High School celebrated its Centenary Year in 1987.

== Hostels ==
The junior section of the school, which hived off as Kimberley Boys' Junior School in 1970, subsequently simply Kimberley Junior School, was served by a hostel known as Dugmore House. Leslie Moult who was hostel superintendent was also first headmaster of Kimberley Boys' Junior School.

The senior hostel was Francis Oats House.

Boys attending Boys' High were also housed at Bishop's Hostel, an institution owned by the Anglican Church until 1981 when it was transferred to Boys' High.

== Sport ==
Sport has an integral role in the life of KHS where every learner is encouraged to take part in at least one summer and one winter sport. At least sixteen KHS alumni have gone on to represent South Africa in international sport. Alumni who have achieved Springbok status in various sporting codes are listed below.

Sporting codes offered by the school today are:Athletics, Basketball, Cricket, Cross country, Golf, Hockey, Rugby, Soccer, Squash, Swimming, and Tennis.

== The performing arts ==
=== Boys' High School Players ===
D.H. Sanders established a tradition of high quality theatrical productions running from 1930 to 1955. Neil Small ran a Performing Arts Group from 1959 to 1962

=== Later generations - musicals ===
Musical theatre flourished from the 1970s under Johan Swart and later Aiden Smith.

The baton was taken up subsequently by Anne Solomon.

== Notable former students ==
- Xenophon Constantine Balaskas, Springbok cricketer, 1930–1939.
- Benjamin Bennett (1904-1985), well-known South African crime writer.
- Rudolph Bigalke (Matric, Dux Medallist, 1914), third director of the National Zoological Gardens of South Africa (Pretoria), 1927 to 1962.
- Rudolph Carl Bigalke, zoologist and one-time director of the McGregor Museum
- Frederick Dobbin, South African international rugby union player
- William Benbow Humphreys (1889-1965), politician, founder of and principal benefactor behind Kimberley's William Humphreys Art Gallery, and recipient of the Freedom of the City of Kimberley.
- Dan Jacobson, author.
- Donald Ross (Matric 1939), pioneer of British cardiac surgery. See Ross procedure.
- Professor Velva Schrire (Matric 1933), Head of the Groote Schuur Hospital Cardiac Clinic at the time that Dr Chris Barnard performed the world's first human heart transplant operation.

=== Alumni notable for their sporting achievements ===
Kimberley Boys’ High School has produced the following Springboks:

Athletics H. Clark (1956), T.R. Jones (1929)

Barefoot water-skiing G. McEwen (1986), Q. Posthumus (1984).

Bowls J.J. Armstrong (1934), E.A. Williams (1952)

Boxing J. Braine, T. White.

Canoeing D.J. Walker (1980)

Clay pigeon shooting J. Douglas (1961), H.A. Herbert (1962), J.A. Hill (half) (1962), D. Pogieter (1961), R. van der Schyff (half) (1962), C.T.C. Westley (1962), W. Wright (1964).

Cricket Xenophon Balaskas (1930-1939), Ernest Bock (1935), Albert Powell (1899), William Shalders (1899-1907), Ken Viljoen (1930-1949), Pat Symcox (1993-1999).

Cycling J. Billett (1969), R.A. Pressly (manager) (1960), R. Robertson (1954), R. Robinson (1952).

Gymkhana D. Brown (1974-5), K. Brown (1983)

Hockey W. Rosenberg (1964), W. Ubsdell (1956)

Karate H. Humphreys (1970)

Modern pentathlon D. Sterley (1968)

Motor racing B. Olthoff (1968)

Rifle shooting G.W. Church (1924)

Rugby F. Bennetto (reserve), J.S. Braine (1912–13), W. Brune (reserve), W.H. Clarke (1933), W. Cotty (1896), J. de Lany (1912), S.C. de Melcker (1903), Frederick J. Dobbin (1903-1913), J.H. Gage (1925-1927 – also Ireland), A.P. Gericke (1932), B. Gibbs (1903), Ian Kirkpatrick (1953-1961), S.H. Ledger (1912-1913), R.J. Lockyear (1960-1961), J.D. McCulloch (1912-1913), J.J. Meintjies (1912-1913), W.C. Martheze (1903–1907), A.W. Powell (1899), J.M. Powell (1891-1903), J.W.E. Raaff (1903-1910), F.C. Smollen (1933), A van der Hoff (1912-1913), J. van der Schyff (1949)

Show jumping B. Taylor (1986)

Soccer V. Marais (1951)

Tennis F. McMillan (1965)

Weight-lifting D. Benjamin (1981), B. Engelbrecht (1952), J. van Rensburg (1952)

Springbok trialists Cricket: W. Dickens, C. Helfrich, J.E. Waddington Rugby: W. Brune, W.H. Kokkinn, R. Roselt, W. Sendin

== See also ==
- Kimberley Girls' High School
