= John Clune (rugby union) =

Irish rugby union player

- Full name: John Joseph Clune
- Born: 2 April 1890 Ireland
- Died: 12 September 1942 (aged 52) off Ascension Island
- School: Blackrock College
- University: Trinity College Dublin
- Occupation: Veterinarian

Rugby union career
- Position: Hooker / Second row
International career
Years	Team	Apps	(Points)
1912–14	Ireland	6	(0)

John Joseph Clune (2 April 1890 — 12 September 1942) was an Irish international rugby union player.

Clune was educated at Blackrock College and Trinity College Dublin. He was capped six times for Ireland, utilised as both a hooker and second row forward, making his debut against the touring 1912–13 Springboks.

After qualifying as a vet, Clune was commissioned to the Royal Army Veterinary Corps and served in Mesopotamia in World War I, then worked at veterinary hospitals in Kurdistan between the wars.

Clune was on a posting to the Indian Army during World War II and attained the rank of lieutenant colonel. On 12 September 1942, Clune was a passenger on RMS Laconia when it was torpedoed by a German U-boat off the West African coast in the South Atlantic. He was one of an estimated 1,600 people to die in the sinking.

== See also ==
- List of Ireland national rugby union players
