= Paul Roos (rugby union) =

South African rugby union player

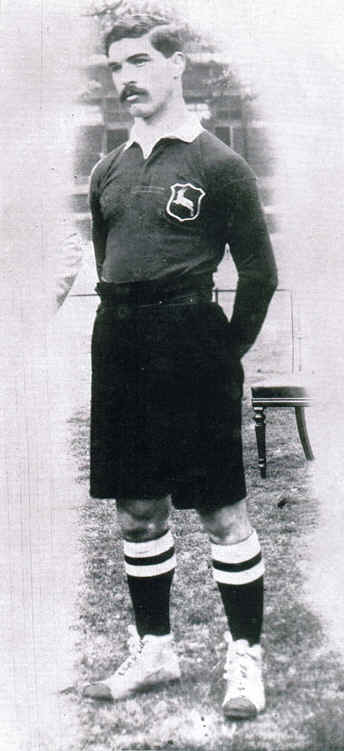
- Paul Roos, Springbok Captain, of the first South African touring rugby team to the British Isles in 1906
- Born: Paul Johannes Roos; 30 October 1880 Stellenbosch, South Africa
- Died: 22 September 1948 (aged 67) Stellenbosch, South Africa
- Height: 181 cm (5 ft 11 in)
- Weight: 90.5 kg (14 st 4 lb)
- School: Stellenbosch Gymnasium
- Occupation: schoolmaster

Rugby union career
- Position: Forward
Amateur team(s)
Years	Team	Apps	(Points)
- Western Province
International career
Years	Team	Apps	(Points)
1903–06	South Africa	4	(0)

Paul Johannes Roos (30 October 1880 – 22 September 1948) (also known as Oom Polla – Afrikaans for "Uncle Polla", "Polla" being a pet name for "Paul") was one of the first South African Springbok rugby union captains and led the first South African rugby team to tour overseas – to Britain in 1906. Roos was born near the South African town of Stellenbosch on 30 October 1880 and completed his education there.

A devout Christian, Roos was a popular rugby player and was chosen by his own teammates to captain the 1906 tour. Throughout the tour he saw the campaign as an attempt to improve the relationship between his fellow countrymen and the British after the events of the Second Boer War.

== Rugby career ==
Roos earliest recorded games of rugby were for Victoria College, for whom he played in the third team in 1897, progressing through the squads until by 1899 he was a prominent member of the first team. With no first class team in the area, he joined the Villagers in 1900, before returning to the Stellenbosch University side in 1901. By 1902 Roos was captaining the team, and led the team with great success.

By 1903 Roos had been selected for the Western Province team, but was such a devout Christian, he refused to play or travel on a Sunday. This led to Roos refusing to play for the Western Province team in the Currie Cup of 1904 as it would mean he would need to travel on a Sunday. The Western Province captain wrote to a professor at Stellenbosch University, where Roos lectured, to convince Roos to play. Roos' brother, Gideon Roos, followed his older brother playing for both Stellenbosch and Western Province before he himself played international rugby for South Africa.

Before his first international match Roos faced the 1903 touring British Isles while representing Western Province; the game ending in a 3–3 draw at Newlands. After his performance for Western Province, Roos was selected to represent the South African national team in 1903 in the final Test against the British Isles. The first two Test matches had both ended in draws, and when the South Africans won, they took their first series against a British team.

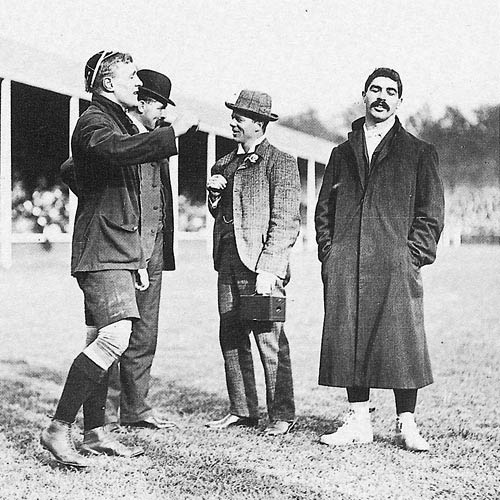
Vincent Cartwright and Paul Roos before the 1906 East Midlands game

In 1906 Roos was part of the first overseas touring South African team. The bulk of the team was made up of Western Province players, who had recently won the Currie Cup. Roos, who was the only player not to have undertaken a trial for the match as he was seen as a certainty for the team, was elected by the rest of the players to be the team captain. After being given the captaincy, Roos addressed the team by stating, "I would like to make absolutely clear at the outset we are not English-speaking or Afrikaans-speaking, but a band of happy South African"; as the tour took place just several years after the end of the Second Boer War, where once teammates had fought on different sides of the conflict.

The tour to Britain, Ireland and France took in 29 matches, including Test games against the four Home Nations and a non-Test with the French national team. The tour began with great expectations, as the previous season had seen the Original All Blacks tour Britain with incredible success. The first 15 games were against club and county teams, with the South Africans victorious in every encounter, though they were run close by a strong Glamorgan County team. The first international encounter for the team was against Scotland, played in front of a record crowd of 30,000. Roos was forced to miss the game after he injured his collarbone in the encounter with Oxford University, and the captaincy was handed over to Paddy Carolin; the match ended in the first defeat for the South African's with Scotland scoring two tries in the second half. The Springboks were back on winning form the very next game against the North of Scotland, then travelled to Belfast to face Ireland. Roos lead his team out at the Balmoral Showgrounds. After the first half, Roos men were leading 3–12, but Ireland levelled the scores to 12–12 before a try from the wing settled the game in the South Africans' favour.

How pleasantly the Tour passed over from first to last. What hospitality we enjoyed, even in private homes. Never could a team wish for better treatment, both from governing bodies and from spectators, than was accorded to us. Coming as it did just after the Anglo-Boer War, the 1906 team probably played no small part in healing the breach and restoring pleasant relations.

— Roos recollections of the 1906 tour, spoken in 1931

The game against Wales was the most anticipated of the tour. Wales had been unofficially crowned the World's best team after a Triple Crown winning season in 1905 and a win over the All Blacks in the 'Game of the Century'. The Glamorgan team that had run the South Africans close earlier in the tour had contained twelve internationals, and the Welsh were keen for revenge. Despite this, Roos was a popular figure in Wales, and with his deep impressive voice and "pronounced Dutch accent", he had spoken at church meetings throughout the tour; and Roos' cordial manner had paid dividends earlier in the tour after the game against Newport. South Africa beat Newport by a goal and a try to nil, and after the game the two team captains sat down at the Westgate Hotel for a post-match dinner. Roos asked Charlie Pritchard, the Newport skipper, how the Newport forwards, who were lighter than the South Africans, had stolen the ball away so many times in the scrums. The tactic, which the Welsh team had used to counter the famous New Zealand scrum, was discussed with great openness between Pritchard and Roos, and when the South Africans left the next day Roos shook Pritchard's hand at the train station and thanked him. This revelation became a controversial talking point when the Welsh press heard of it.

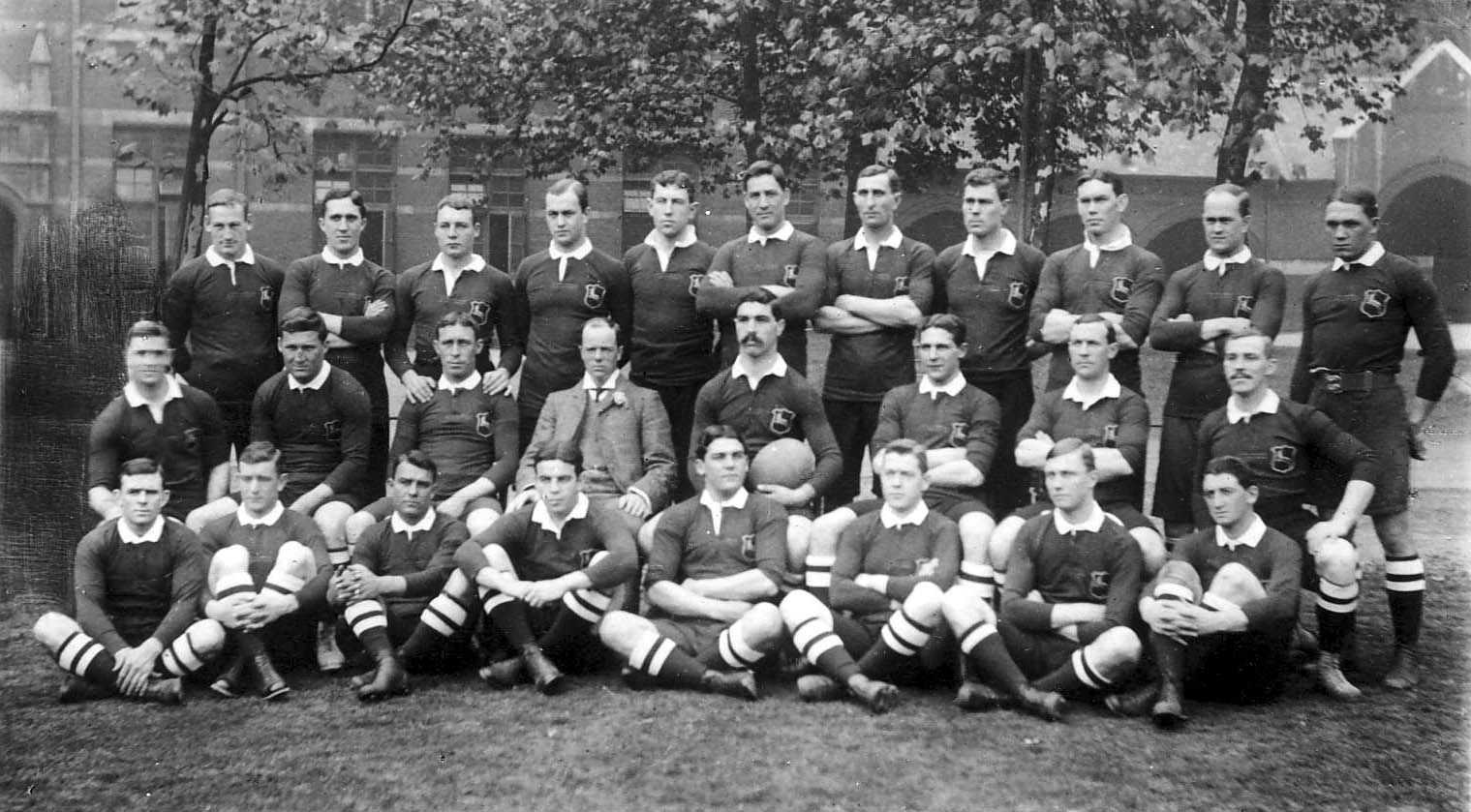
Roos' 1906 touring South Africa team

The match against Wales was set for 1 December 1906, and was played at St. Helen's Ground in Swansea. Wales selected a strong team, with Teddy Morgan and Johnnie Williams on the wings, and captained by talismanic three-quarter Gwyn Nicholls, who had come out of retirement to lead the Welsh. Roos started the match with heavy strapping to protect an injured shoulder, and several of his team were suffering from coughs and sore throats brought on by the British winter weather. Although the Welsh started at a fast pace, the South Africans soon began to launch their own attacks and the firm surface of the St. Helen's pitch played to the Springbok's strengths. Wales under performed throughout the game, and the Springbok tactic to tightly mark Nicholls and Rhys Gabe at centre prevented the pair's normal open game. South Africa scored three tries without reply, dominating the game 11–0. At the final whistle the South African supporters, assisted by Welsh fans, rushed onto the pitch and carried Roos from the field. Roos later stated that 'he considered it to be the greatest honour of his life to be borne triumphant from the ground by supporters of his beaten opponents'.

A week later the South Africans faced England at Crystal Palace and Roos was fit enough to lead his team out against international opposition for the third time. Conditions for the match were poor; the pitch resembled a morass and a drizzle that began half an hour before the kick off continued throughout the game. After 20 minutes the ball was extremely difficult to handle and the backs from both teams found themselves unable to interact in the game with any real purpose. The game ended in a 3–3 draw, and Roos took the opportunity after the game to again address the legacy of the Boer War, proclaiming, "...this tour will do far more to calm the troubled waters of South African life than years of legislation." Although a match against France was planned at the end of the tour, the game was not officially recognised, and the England encounter was Roos' final international game, ending with a record of played four, won three, drawn one.

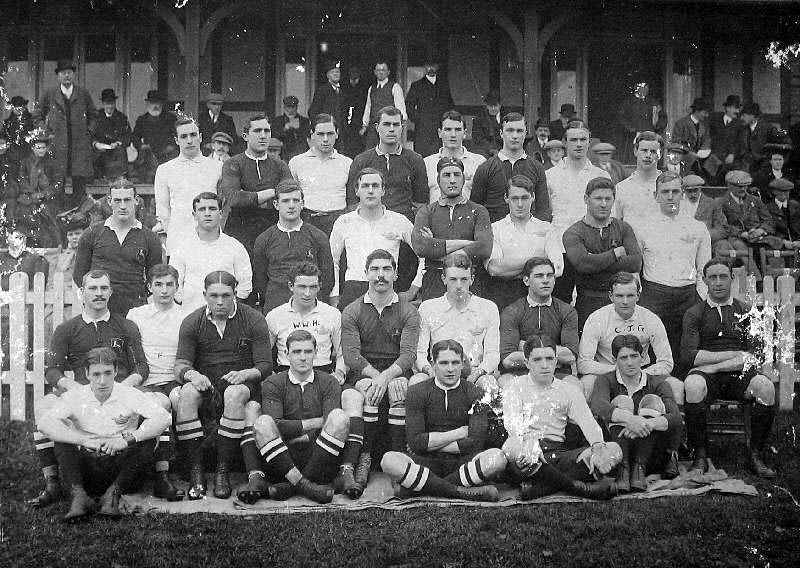
Joint photo of Oxford University and the Springboks, the game in which Roos was injured.

As the tour headed towards its end, the South African's took control of the matches once again, beating Lancashire narrowly, but with decisive wins over Cumberland, Surrey and Cornwall. The team then returned to Wales for the last three games of the British leg of their tour. Continuing their impressive form, South Africa beat a Monmouthshire team and then Roos lead his team in a victory over Llanelli. The final game, before leaving for France, was against Cardiff, captained by Percy Bush. Several of the Cardiff players had represented Wales when the teams had met earlier in the tour, and amongst the Cardiff squad was Gwyn Nicholls, who had received much of the blame for the Welsh defeat. The conditions at the Cardiff Arms Park were worse than the England game, and after Roos lost the toss, the Welsh took advantage of the weather, using the wind to keep the ball behind the South Africans and choosing to dribble rather than handle the ball. The tour appeared to have caught up with the Springboks, who appeared slow, allowing Cardiff to score four tries without reply. For only the second time on the tour, the South Africans had been beaten, this time by a convincing 17–0 scoreline. At the after-match dinner at the Queen's Hotel in Cardiff, Roos stood to make a speech, "It is only human to be disappointed in having been beaten... but I am glad for one man's sake that you had such a glorious success, and that is our friend Gwyn Nicholls."

The final match of the series was against a France XV, and was played at the Parc des Princes in Paris on 3 January 1907, just two days after the Cardiff defeat. Despite coming from a bad defeat played in sapping conditions, Paul Roos' team beat the French side 55–6.

=== The Springboks ===
It was during the tour that the South African national rugby union team's nickname, Springboks, was first used. At an impromptu meeting, the tour manager Cecil Carden, vice-captain Carolin and Paul Roos invented the nickname 'Springbok' to prevent the British press from inventing their own nickname. Roos told the newspaper reporters that they were to call the team 'De Springbokken', the Daily Mail then printed an article referring to the 'Springboks'. The trip helped heal wounds after the Boer War and instilled a sense of national pride in the South Africans.

=== Test history ===
No.	Opponents	Results (SA 1st)	Position	Tries	Dates	Venue
1.	(United Kingdom) British Isles	8–0	Forward		12 Sep 1903	Newlands, Cape Town
2.	Ireland	15–12	Forward (c)		24 Nov 1906	Ravenhill Grounds, Belfast
3.	Wales	11–0	Forward (c)		1 Dec 1906	St Helen's, Swansea
4.	England	3–3	Forward (c)		8 Dec 1906	Crystal Palace, London

== Later life ==
In 1910 he became Rector of the Stellenbosch Boys' High School, formerly Stellenbosch Gymnasium, of which he was a former pupil and teacher. He held this post for thirty years and retired in 1940. In 1941 the name of Stellenbosch Boys' High School was changed to Paul Roos Gymnasium in his honour.

He was elected as a National Party member of parliament for Stellenbosch in 1948. He died on 22 September 1948.

== See also ==
- List of South Africa national rugby union players – Springbok no. 88

== Bibliography ==
- Billot, John (1974). Springboks in Wales. Ferndale: Ron Jones Publications.
- Griffiths, John (1982). The Book of English International Rugby 1872–1982. London: Willow Books. ISBN 0002180065.
- Parry-Jones, David (1999). Prince Gwyn, Gwyn Nicholls and the First Golden Era of Welsh Rugby. Bridgend: seren. ISBN 1-85411-262-7.
- Platnauer, E.J.L. (1907). Springbokken tour in Great Britain. Johannesburg: Geo. Wunderlich.
- Thomas, J.B.G.; Rowe, Harding (1954). On Tour. Essex: Anchor Press Ltd.

Sporting positions
Preceded by Paddy Carolin	South Africa national rugby union team captain 1906	Succeeded by Dougie Morkel
