= Godfrey Wrentmore =

South African cricketer and rugby union footballer

Godfrey 'Bai' Maynard Wrentmore (20 February 1893 – 16 August 1953) was a South African sportsman who played first-class cricket with Western Province and represented his country at rugby union.

Born in Okiep, Namaqualand, Wrentmore appeared in five first-class matches for Western Province during the 1910/11 Currie Cup cricket season. He also played rugby with Western Province and in 1912/13 toured the British Isles, Ireland, and France with the South African national rugby union team. Wrentmore, a centre, failed to break into the Test side but did play in nine tour matches for the Springboks.
