= Reg Plummer (rugby union) =

British Lions & Wales international rugby union player (1888–1953)

- Born: Reginald Clifford Stanley Plummer; 29 December 1888 Newport, Monmouthshire
- Died: 18 June 1953 (aged 64) Newport, Monmouthshire
- School: Long Ashton School, Bristol
- Occupation: Hotelier

Rugby union career
- Position: Wing
Amateur team(s)
Years	Team	Apps	(Points)
- London Welsh RFC
1905-1923	Newport RFC		
1922-1923	Crawshays RFC		
1921-1922	Barbarian F.C.		
International career
Years	Team	Apps	(Points)
1912-1913	Wales	5	(6)
1910	British Lions	0	(0)

Reg Plummer (29 December 1888 – 18 June 1953) was a Welsh international, rugby union wing who played club rugby for Newport and invitational rugby with both the Barbarians and Crawshays RFC. He won five caps for Wales and was selected for the British Lions 1910 tour of South Africa, though he did not play in any of the test games.

== Rugby career ==
Plummer first played for Newport in 1905 at the age of 17 and spent almost the entirety of his career with the club. He captained Newport during the 1920/21 season and was part of the team that faced three touring sides; the 1906 and 1912 South Africans and the 1910 Australians.

Plummer was first capped for Wales on 3 February 1912 when he played against Scotland at St Helens under the captaincy of Dicky Owen. It was an excellent game from a Welsh viewpoint as the team beat Scotland 21-6, and Plummer himself scored a try. During the same campaign he scored a second international try, this time against France at Rodney Parade. Plummer was later selected against the touring South African team, as he done so for Newport two months earlier.

=== International matches played ===
Wales

- England 1913
- France 1912
- Ireland 1912
- Scotland 1912
- South Africa 1912

== Bibliography ==
- Smith, David; Williams, Gareth (1980). Fields of Praise: The Official History of The Welsh Rugby Union. Cardiff: University of Wales Press. ISBN 0-7083-0766-3.
