= Monmouthshire County RFC =

Welsh rugby union team

(Wales) Monmouthshire County RFC
- Full name: Monmouthshire County Rugby Football Club
- Location: Monmouthshire

Monmouthshire County RFC is a Welsh rugby union club that manages an invitational team, known as Monmouthshire that originally played rugby at county level. The team was made up of amateur players from sports clubs in the Monmouthshire region and historically played matches against other county teams from Wales and England, and during the 20th century was a fixture for touring international teams. Today clubs from the Monmouthshire region are still affiliated to Monmouthshire County RFC, as well as the Welsh Rugby Union.

== Games played against international opposition ==
Year	Date	Opponent	Result	Score	Tour	Ground
1906	26 December	(United Kingdom) South Africa	Loss	0–17	1906–07 South Africa rugby union tour of Europe	Rodney Parade, Newport
1912	12 October	South Africa	Loss	0–16	1912–13 South Africa rugby union tour of Europe	Recreation Ground, Pontypool
1919	5 May	New Zealand	Win	4–3	New Zealand Army rugby team of 1919	Ebbw Vale
1946	27 February	New Zealand Services	Win	15–0	1945–46 New Zealand Services tour of Britain	Recreation Ground, Pontypool
1967	6 December	New Zealand	Loss	12–23	1967 New Zealand rugby union tour of Britain, France and Canada	Rodney Parade, Newport
1969	19 November	South Africa	Win	14–8	1969–70 South Africa rugby union tour of Britain and Ireland	Eugene Cross Park, Ebbw Vale
1973	26 September	Japan	Win	26–16	1973 Japan tour of Wales, England and France	Pontypool Park, Pontypool
1976	21 January	Australia	Loss	15-26	1975-76 Australia rugby union tour of Britain, Ireland and the United States	Pontypool Park, Pontypool
1978	29 November	New Zealand	Loss	9–26	1978 New Zealand tour of Britain and Ireland	Rodney Parade, Newport
1982	3 November	New Zealand Māori	Loss	9–18	1982 New Zealand Māori tour of Wales	Rodney Parade, Newport
1992	17 November	Australia	Loss	9–19	1992 Australia rugby union tour of Europe	Eugene Cross Park, Ebbw Vale
