= Glyn Stephens =

Wales rugby union player (1891–1965)

- Born: David Hopkin Stephens; 19 September 1891 Rhydding, Neath, Wales
- Died: 22 April 1965 (aged 73) Neath, Wales
- School: Cadoxton Church School, Neath
- Notable relative: Rees Stephens (son)

Rugby union career
- Position: Prop
Amateur team(s)
| Years | Team | Apps | (Points) |
| ? | Neath RFC | | |
International career
| Years | Team | Apps | (Points) |
| 1912-1919 | Wales | 10 | (0) |

David Hopkin "Glyn" Stephens (19 September 1891 – 22 April 1965) was a Welsh international rugby union prop who played club rugby for Neath. He won 10 caps for Wales and captained his country. He was the father of Welsh rugby international, Rees Stephens and would later become president of the Welsh Rugby Union.

== Rugby career ==
Stephens earned his first Welsh cap against England on 20 January 1912 in a game at Twickenham, Wales lost the game, but Stephens was back for the next three matches in the 1912 Five Nations Championship. Stephens played not only in the home nations matches but also faced South Africa in the 1912 tour. After the war he played his last international game when he captained the Welsh team against the New Zealand Army. After his retirement from the game he became involved in the management of rugby and in 1956 became president of the WRU.

=== International matches played ===
Wales

- England 1912, 1913
- France 1912, 1913
- Ireland 1912, 1913
- New Zealand Army XV 1919
- Scotland 1912, 1913
- South Africa 1912

== Bibliography ==
- Smith, David; Williams, Gareth (1980). Fields of Praise: The Official History of The Welsh Rugby Union. Cardiff: University of Wales Press. ISBN 0-7083-0766-3.
- Thomas, Wayne (1979). A Century of Welsh Rugby Players. Ansells Ltd.
