= E. H. D. Sewell =

English cricketer, journalist, and author

Edward Sewell

Cricket information
- Batting: Right-handed
- Bowling: Right-arm medium

Career statistics
Competition	First-class
Matches	87
Runs scored	3,430
Batting average	24.50
100s/50s	5/17
Top score	181
Balls bowled	1,499
Wickets	17
Bowling average	47.47
5 wickets in innings	0
10 wickets in match	0
Best bowling	3/73
Catches/stumpings	70/0
- Source: CricketArchive

Edward Humphrey Dalrymple Sewell (30 September 1872 – 20 September 1947) was a first-class cricketer, popular cricket and rugby journalist and author, known universally as E. H. D. Sewell.

== Family ==
His grandfather was Sir William Henry Sewell (c1786–1862), who had been aide-de-camp to William Beresford, 1st Viscount Beresford, during the Peninsular War, and joined the Duke of Wellington's army in Portugal in 1808. Sir William was present with Sir John Moore's army in its retreat from Corunna and later served for 28 years in India.

His father Colonel Henry Fane Haylett Sewell (1838–1910) was a Colonel in the East Indies. He married Violetta Anna Burn in Singapore May 1860, they had seven sons.

Edward H D was the youngest son, born in Lingsugur, India, where his father served as an Army officer. Sewell was educated at the Rectory in Shropshire and Bedford School in England, returning to India as a civil servant. In 1893 he married Amie Sharpe, who was born in Darjeeling. They had a child, Douglas, born in Coonsor, India, in 1895 and later educated at Dulwich College.

== Career ==
While playing cricket in India he became the first batsman in the country to score three consecutive hundreds. In 1893 he played in the first ever All-India side. He went back to England and after a couple of seasons with London County he joined Essex in 1902. He remained with Essex until 1904 but his highest score was made for London County when he made 181 against Surrey at Crystal Palace. A big hitter of the ball, it is said that one of his on-drives measured 140 yards.

He was known as a good rugby footballer, playing for Bedford, Blackheath and Harlequins, but was most notable as a cricket player. On his return from India he became a professional cricket player for Essex. In 1904 he reached his highest score of 181 under the Captain W.G. Grace, at Crystal Palace against Surrey. Later he was coach to young players at The Oval for Surrey County Cricket Club, and played for Bedfordshire and Buckinghamshire. His final first-class match for the MCC Marylebone Cricket Club was in 1922.

He wrote for various newspapers, as well as many books on both cricket and rugby. His first book was published in 1911, and he continued to write up until his death in 1947. Among his many books were The Log of a Sportsman (1923), From a Window at Lords (1937), Who's Won the Toss? (1940) and Rugger: The Man’s Game (1944), reminiscing on the past fifty years of the game.

Edward died on 20 September 1947 in Paddington, London. His obituary in The Times newspaper wrote of his achievements as a writer and player, both of cricket and Rugby football. A friend wrote that he had a kindly and gentle disposition, an alert mind, and was a good man and a good sportsman.

== Books by E H D Sewell ==
- The past Rugby Football season, extracts from the Fortnightly Review, 1908
- The Revival in Rugby Football, extracts from the Fortnightly Review, 1910
- The Book of Football, J M Dent & Sons Ltd., 1911
- Cricket points: for the county, 'varsity, public school, and club cricketer, Sporting Life, London, 1911
- Triangular Cricket: Being a Record of the Greatest Contest in the History of the Game, J. M. Dent & Co., London, 1912
- Rugby Football Internationals Roll of Honour, T.C. & E.C. Jack, London & Edinburgh, 1919 (A tribute to all the rugby internationals who died during the Great War 1914 – 1919),
- Rugby Football Up To Date, Hodder & Stoughton, London, 1921
- Log of a Sportsman, T Fisher Unwin Ltd., Adelphi Terrace, London 1923 (Cricket, Rugger and Hunting in India)
- Cricket Up To Date, John Murray, 1931
- Rugby Football To-Day, John Murray, 1931
- First Principles of Cricket, Boy's Own Paper, GB, 1935
- From a Window at Lord's, (Essays on cricket) Methuen, 1937, (includes an account of the 1936-37 M.C.C. tour of Australia)
- Who's Won the Toss? Stanley Paul, 1940 Foreword by C.B.Fry
- Cricket Under Fire, Stanley Paul & Co, London, 1941 (includes chapters 'The Fade-Out of Jardine and Larwood' and 'The Game in India')
- Rugger: The Man's Game, First edition 1944, (revised by O. L. Owen; with a preface by Captain C.B.Fry) Hollis and Carter Ltd, London, 1950
- An Outdoor Wallah, Stanley Paul, 1945 (Autobiography) (with chapters on W.G. Grace, Ranjitsinhji, and the 1933-34 M.C.C. tour of India)
- Well Hit! Sir, Stanley Paul, London, 1946 (includes an account of the 1946 Indian tour of England)
- Overthrows, Stanley Paul, London, 1946

Contribution – extended reminiscences:

'The Memorial Biography of Dr. W. G. Grace', issued under the Auspices of The Committee of the MCC, Constable & Company Ltd., London 1919

== Sources ==
- May 2006 edition of Soul Search, the journal of The Sole Society. A British Family History Society, http://www.sole.org.uk/
- BM&D and census records
- Tony Collins, A Social History of English Rugby Union, Routledge, Oxford, 2009, ISBN 0-415-47660-7 (many references to EHD Sewell
- IMAGE: Edward Sewell: cricketer, columnist and part of the first all-India team
