= Dougie Morkel =

South African rugby union player (1885–1950)

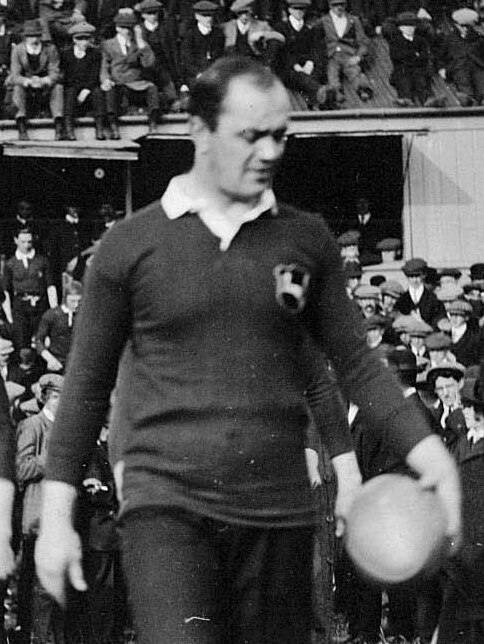
- Entering the pitch to play Cornwall. (10 October 1912)
- Born: Douglas Francis Theodore Morkel; 26 October 1885 Kimberley, South Africa
- Died: 20 February 1950 (aged 64)
- Height: 1.83 m (6 ft 0 in)
- Weight: 92.1 kg (203 lb)
- School: Marist College, Johannesburg

Rugby union career
- Position: Forward
Amateur team(s)
Years	Team	Apps	(Points)
- C. S. A. R.
Provincial / State sides
Years	Team	Apps	(Points)
- Transvaal
International career
Years	Team	Apps	(Points)
1906–1913	South Africa	9	(38)
- Correct as of 15 October 2007

Douglas Francis Theodore Morkel (26 October 1885 – 20 February 1950) was a South African international rugby union player. He was one of Paul Roos 1906 touring Springboks.

== Biography ==
Morkel was born in Kimberley in 1885, but as a child moved to Johannesburg with his parents. In 1903 he played for the Witwatersrand team against the touring team from the British Isles. In 1905, Morkel joined the Central South African Railways Club and in 1906 he was selected for Transvaal to play in the Currie Cup tournament. After the tournament, he was selected for South Africa to tour Europe, under the captaincy of Paul Roos. He made his test debut against Ireland on 24 November 1906 in Belfast.

Morkel played in two test matches against the 1910 British Isles team and captained the Springboks in the first test in Johannesburg. He again toured with the Springboks to Europe in 1912–13, playing in all five test matches and also captained the team against England. In addition to the 9 test matches that Morkel played, he also played 31 tour matches, in which he scored 99 points.

=== Test history ===
No.	Opponents	Results (SA 1st)	Position	Points	Dates	Venue
1.	Ireland	15–12	Forward		24 Nov 1906	Balmoral Showgrounds, Belfast
2.	England	3–3	Forward		8 Dec 1906	Crystal Palace, London
3.	(United Kingdom) British Isles	14–10	Forward (c)	5 (1 try, 1 conv)	6 Aug 1910	Wanderers, Johannesburg
4.	(United Kingdom) British Isles	21–5	Forward	9 (3 conv, 1 pen)	3 Sep 1910	Newlands, Cape Town
5.	Scotland	16–0	Forward	2 (1 conv)	23 Nov 1912	Inverleith, Edinburgh
6.	Ireland	38–0	Forward		30 Nov 1912	Lansdowne Road, Dublin
7.	Wales	3–0	Forward	3 (1 pen)	14 Dec 1912	Cardiff Arms Park, Cardiff
8.	England	9–3	Forward (c)	6 (2 pen)	4 Jan 1913	Twickenham, London
9.	France	38–5	Forward	13 (2 tries, 2 conv, 1 pen)	11 Jan 1913	Le Bouscat, Bordeaux

Legend: try (3 pts); pen = penalty (3 pts.); conv = conversion (2 pts.), drop = drop kick (4 pts.).

== See also ==
- List of South Africa national rugby union players – Springbok no. 106

Sporting positions
Preceded by Paul Roos	Springbok Captain; 1910, 1913	Succeeded by Billy Millar
