= 1914 Five Nations Championship =

Rugby union competition

- Date: 1 January - 13 April 1914
- Countries: England; France; Ireland; Scotland; Wales

Tournament statistics
- Champions: England (6th title)
- Grand Slam: England (2nd title)
- Triple Crown: England (5th title)
- Matches played: 9

The 1914 Five Nations Championship was the fifth series of the rugby union Five Nations Championship following the inclusion of France into the Home Nations Championship. Including the previous Home Nations Championships, this was the thirty-second series of the annual northern hemisphere rugby union championship. Nine matches were played between 1 January and 13 April. It was contested by England, France, Ireland, Scotland and Wales.

== Table ==
Pos	Team	Pld	W	D	L	PF	PA	PD	Pts
1	England	4	4	0	0	82	49	+33	8
2	Wales	4	3	0	1	75	18	+57	6
3	Ireland	4	2	0	2	29	34	−5	4
4	Scotland	3	0	0	3	20	46	−26	0
4	France	3	0	0	3	19	78	−59	0

== Matches ==
=== France vs. Ireland ===
1 January 1914

France	6 – 8	Ireland
Try: Lacoste; André		Try: Quinn; Wood; Con: Lloyd

Parc de Princes, Paris
Referee: EW Calver (England)

=== England vs. Wales ===
17 January 1914

England	10 – 9	Wales
Try: Brown; Pillman; Con: Chapman (2)		Try: Watts; Con: Bancroft; Drop: Hirst

Twickenham, London
Referee: James Greenlees (Scotland)

England: WR Johnston (Bristol Rugby), Cyril Lowe (Cambridge U), FE Chapman (Hartlepool Rovers), Ronald Poulton (Liverpool) (capt.), JHD Watson (Blackheath), FM Taylor (Leicester), GW Wood (Leicester), AG Bull (Northampton), AF Maynard (Cambridge U), John Eric Greenwood (Cambridge U), LG Brown (The London H.), J Brunton (North Durham), S Smart (Gloucester), G Ward (Leicester), Charles Pillman (Blackheath)

Wales: Bancroft (Swansea), Howell Lewis (Swansea), WH Evans (Llwynypia), W Watts (Llanelli), George Hirst (Newport), Clem Lewis (Cardiff), Bobby Lloyd (Pontypool), Jenkin Alban Davies (Llanelli) (capt.), David Watts (Maesteg), Jack Jones (Abertillery), Thomas Lloyd (Neath), Percy Jones (Pontypool), T Williams (Swansea), Edgar Morgan (Swansea), Harry Uzzell (Newport)

=== Wales vs. Scotland ===
7 February 1914

Wales	24 – 5	Scotland
Try: I Davies; Wetter; Hirst; Con: Bancroft (2); Drop: Hirst; Lewis; Pen: Bancroft		Try: Stewart; Con: Laing

Cardiff Arms Park, Cardiff
Referee: V Dreenon (Ireland)

=== Ireland vs. Wales ===
14 March 1914

Ireland	3 – 11	Wales
Try: Foster		Try: Davies; J Jones; Wetter; Con: Lewis

Balmoral Showgrounds, Belfast
Referee: John Tulloch (Scotland)

Ireland:

Wales: Bobbie Williams (Cardiff), George Hirst (Newport), Jack Wetter (Newport), WH Evans (Llwynypia), Ivor Davies (Llanelli), (Newport), Clem Lewis (Cardiff), Bobby Lloyd (Pontypool), Jenkin Alban Davies (Llanelli) capt., David Watts (Maesteg), Jack Jones (Abertillery), Thomas Lloyd (Neath), Percy Jones (Pontypool), T Williams (Swansea), Edgar Morgan (Swansea), Harry Uzzell (Newport)
