= 1920–21 Rugby Union County Championship =

28th edition of England's premier rugby union club competition

1920–21 County Championship
- Countries: England
- Champions: Gloucestershire (4th title)
- Runners-up: Leicestershire

The 1920–21 Rugby Union County Championship was the 28th edition of England's premier rugby union club competition at the time.

Gloucestershire won the competition for the fourth time defeating Leicestershire in the final.

== Semifinals ==
Date	Venue	Team one	Team two	Score
19 Feb	Welford Road Stadium	Leicestershire	Yorkshire	8-5
17 Feb	Kingsholm Stadium	Gloucestershire	Surrey	21-3

=== Final ===
10 March 1921

Gloucestershire	31–4	Leicestershire
Try: Feltham (2), Williams, Cook (2), Corbett; Con: x5, Pickles		Drop: x1

Kingsholm Stadium, Gloucester
Attendance: official 10,701
estimated 12,000
Referee: Helliwell (Yorkshire)

Reg Pickles (capt)	Bristol
H Feltham	Bristol
Stanley Cook	Gloucester & Cambridge U
Len Corbett	Bristol
T Spoors	Bristol
Tom Millington	Gloucester
William 'Father' Dix	Gloucester
George Halford	Gloucester
Sid Smart	Gloucester
Tom Voyce	Gloucester
Frank Ayliffe	Gloucester
Arthur 'Tart' Hall	Gloucester
Sam Tucker	Bristol
F Harris	Gloucester
F Williams	Gloucester

J Wilkinson	Leicester
F Mellor	Leicester
Percy Lawrie	Leicester
J Markham	Leicester
Teddy Haselmere	Leicester
F M Taylor	Leicester
G Wood	Leicester
G Ward	Leicester
Sos Taylor	Leicester
G Cross	Leicester
Doug Norman	Leicester
W J Allen	Leicester
W Buckler	Leicester
J Wickson	Leicester
B Ward	Leicester

=== See also ===
- English rugby union system
- Rugby union in England
