= 1914 in Wales =

- Centuries: 18th; 19th; 20th; 21st
- Decades: 1890s; 1900s; 1910s; 1920s; 1930s
- See also: List of years in Wales; Timeline of Welsh history 1914 in The United Kingdom Scotland Elsewhere

This article is about the particular significance of the year 1914 to Wales and its people.

== Incumbents ==
- Archdruid of the National Eisteddfod of Wales – Dyfed
- Lord Lieutenant of Anglesey – Sir Richard Henry Williams-Bulkeley, 12th Baronet
- Lord Lieutenant of Brecknockshire – Joseph Bailey, 2nd Baron Glanusk
- Lord Lieutenant of Caernarvonshire – John Ernest Greaves
- Lord Lieutenant of Cardiganshire – Herbert Davies-Evans
- Lord Lieutenant of Carmarthenshire – John William Gwynne Hughes
- Lord Lieutenant of Denbighshire – William Cornwallis-West
- Lord Lieutenant of Flintshire – William Glynne Charles Gladstone
- Lord Lieutenant of Glamorgan – Robert Windsor-Clive, 1st Earl of Plymouth
- Lord Lieutenant of Merionethshire – Sir Osmond Williams, 1st Baronet
- Lord Lieutenant of Monmouthshire – Ivor Herbert, 1st Baron Treowen
- Lord Lieutenant of Montgomeryshire – Sir Herbert Williams-Wynn, 7th Baronet
- Lord Lieutenant of Pembrokeshire – John Philipps, 1st Viscount St Davids
- Lord Lieutenant of Radnorshire – Powlett Milbank
- Bishop of Bangor – Watkin Williams
- Bishop of Llandaff – Joshua Pritchard Hughes
- Bishop of St Asaph – A. G. Edwards (later Archbishop of Wales)
- Bishop of St Davids – John Owen

== Events ==
- 14 January - The first trolleybuses in Wales come into operation, in Aberdare.
- 23 February - Light cruiser HMS Cordelia is launched at Pembroke Dock.
- 11 March - A Welsh Home Rule Bill is introduced by Edward T. John, MP for East Denbighshire; it fails.
- 4 April - Ystradfellte Reservoir inaugurated.
- 2 May - South Wales Transport begins operating motorbuses in the Swansea area.
- 4 August - World War I: Declaration of war by the United Kingdom on the German Empire.
- 6 August - Pembroke Dock-built HMS Amphion (1911) becomes the first British naval casualty of the war when she strikes mines off the east coast.
- 18 September - Welsh Church Act, disestablishing the Church in Wales, receives Royal Assent, but simultaneously with the Suspensory Act which delays its coming into effect.
- 21 September - William Charles Fuller wins the Victoria Cross for carrying a wounded officer to safety under fire.
- 14 November - Light cruiser HMS Carysfort is launched at Pembroke Dock.
- unknown dates
  - A women's teacher training college opens at Barry; a men's equivalent opens at Caerleon.
  - The hundredth intermediate school in Wales is established under the Welsh Intermediate and Technical Education Act, 1889.
  - William James Thomas, industrialist and philanthropist, is knighted.
  - Pen-coed Castle is restored by D. A. Thomas, Viscount Rhondda.

== Arts and literature ==
- January - The monthly periodical Welsh Outlook is founded by Thomas Jones (T. J.).

=== Awards ===
- National Eisteddfod of Wales - not held

=== New books ===
- Rhoda Broughton - Concerning a Vow
- Moelwyn - Caniadau Moelwyn, vol. 4
- Bertrand Russell - Our Knowledge of the External World as a Field for Scientific Method in Philosophy
- T. E. Ellis - Pont Orewyn

=== Drama ===
- T. Gwynn Jones - Caradog yn Rhufain

=== Music ===
- David John de Lloyd - Gwlad fy Nhadau (cantata)
- Ivor Novello - "Keep the Home Fires Burning"
- William Rhys-Herbert - The Bo'sn's Bride (operetta based on a play by Maude Elizabeth Inch)

== Film ==
- Welsh-descended Harold Lloyd begins his film career.
- Wild Wales

== Sport ==
- Boxing
  - 26 January: Percy Jones wins the British, European and World (disputed) featherweight titles.
  - 30 March: Jimmy Wilde wins the European flyweight title.
  - 7 July: Freddie Welsh wins the World lightweight title
  - 14 December: Johnny Basham wins the British welterweight title.
- Rugby union
  - 14 March: After Percy Jones is targeted by Irish players during the 1914 Five Nations Championship, Harry Uzzell leads his men in retaliation in a game notorious for its on the field violence. Wales win the match, and the Welsh pack are dubbed the 'Terrible Eight' by the press.

== Births ==
- 28 January - Trefor Morgan, financier (d. 1970)
- 11 February - Mervyn Levy, art critic (d. 1996)
- 12 March - Tommy Farr, boxer (d. 1986)
- 12 March - Cliff Jones, Wales international rugby captain (d. 1990)
- 21 March - Sir Goronwy Daniel, academic and civil servant (d. 2003)
- 23 April - Glyn Daniel, archaeologist and television presenter (d. 1986)
- 18 May - Louis Ford, footballer
- 24 May
  - Sir Granville Beynon, physicist, (d. 1996)
  - Harry Parr Davies, composer and songwriter (d. 1955)
- 9 September - Alexander Cordell, novelist (d. 1997)
- 12 September - Desmond Llewelyn, actor (d. 1999)
- 22 October - David Tecwyn Lloyd, author (d. 1992)
- 27 October - Dylan Thomas, poet (d. 1953)
- 21 November - Charles Fisher, poet (d. 2006)
- 2 December - Russell Taylor, Wales international rugby player
- 7 December - Bryan Hopkin, economist (d. 2009)
- date unknown - Norah Isaac, educationalist (died 2003)

== Deaths ==
- 22 February - Ivor Bertie Guest, 1st Baron Wimborne, 78
- 4 May - Rowland Griffiths, rugby player, 28 (typhoid)
- 17 May - John L. Griffiths, US lawyer and diplomat of Welsh parentage, 58
- 16 June - John Hughes (Landore), composer, 42 (cerebral haemorrhage)
- 18 June - Abel Davies, rugby union player, 53?
- 21 June - Morgan Bransby Williams, engineer, 89
- 23 July - Harry Evans, conductor and composer, 41
- 8 August - Sir Edward Anwyl, academic, 48
- 22 August (in Swanley) - James Dickson Innes, artist, 27 (tuberculosis)
- 27 August - William Lewis, 1st Baron Merthyr, 77
- 17 September - Shadrach Pryce, clergyman and educationalist, 81
- 2 October - Jack Hughes, footballer, 59
- 22 October - William Morgan, cricketer, 51/2
- 27 October - Sir T. Marchant Williams, lawyer and author, 68/9

== See also ==
- 1914 in Ireland
