= 1913–14 Rugby Union County Championship =

English rugby union competition

1913–1914 County Championship
- Countries: England
- Date: October 1913 – March 1914
- Champions: Midland Counties (1st title)
- Runners-up: Durham County

The 1913–1914 Rugby Union County Championship was the 26th edition of England's premier rugby union club competition at the time.

The Midland Counties won the competition for the first time defeating Durham County in the final.

== Draw and results ==
=== Semifinals ===
Date	Team one	Team two	Score
18 Feb	Midland Counties	Cornwall	24-10
7 Mar	Durham County	Yorkshire	14-13

=== Final ===
28 March 1914

Midland Counties	22–5	Durham County
Try: Hill, Tarr, Wood; Con: Mellor; Pen: Mellor; Drop: Pemberton, Turland		Try: Dingle

Welford Road Stadium, Leicester

F Mellor	Leicester
M G Turland	Coventry
H J Pemberton	Coventry
Frank Tarr	Leicester
S A Hunter	Leicester
Pedlar Wood	Leicester
Tim Taylor	Leicester
George Ward	Leicester
H S B Lawrie	Leicester
J W Allen	Leicester
G Hopkins	Leicester
F Taylor	Leicester
William Oldham	Coventry
H W Hill	Moseley
J B Leather	Handsworth

G Farrow	Hartlepool Rovers
Arthur Dingle	Hartlepool Rovers
Fred Chapman	Hartlepool Rovers
A Gelsthorpe	Durham University
J Thompson	Hartlepool Rovers
H J Dingle	Durham University
J Sivewright	Hartlepool Rovers
C Pickersgill	Sunderland
W A Robertson	Hartlepool Rovers
R H Robson	Hartlepool Rovers
J Farrow	Hartlepool Rovers
J Ainslie	Hartlepool Rovers
A T Harrison	North Durham
R Noble	North Durham
D H Blakey	Winlaton Vulcans

== See also ==
- English rugby union system
- Rugby union in England
