= Charles Pillman =

English rugby union player

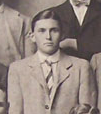
- Born: Charles Henry Pillman; 8 January 1890 Bromley, England
- Died: 13 November 1955 (aged 65) Bromley-by-Bow, England
- Height: 1.90 m (6 ft 3 in)
- Weight: 78 kg (12 st 4 lb)
- School: Tonbridge School
- Occupation: stock broker

Rugby union career
- Position: Flanker
Senior career
Years	Team	Apps	(Points)
1907–1908	Sidcup F.C.		
1908–1920	Blackheath F.C.		
1910–1913	Barbarian F.C.		
1908–1913	Kent		
International career
Years	Team	Apps	(Points)
1910–1914	England	18	(26)
1910	British Isles	3	(4)

Charles Henry "Cherry" Pillman MC (8 January 1890 – 13 November 1955) was an English rugby union international who played on 18 occasions for his country and was part of the first official British Isles team that toured South Africa in 1910. He played club rugby with Blackheath and county rugby for Kent. Pillman's speed and tactics made him one of the leading exponents of an attacking wing forward, now recognised as the flanker position.

== Personal history ==
Charles Henry Pillman was born in Bromley, England, in 1890 to Joseph Charles and Mary Anna Pillman. He was educated at Tonbridge School and was a member of the London Stock Exchange. With the outbreak of the First World War he joined the 4th Dragoon Guards reaching the rank of second lieutenant. He was later Lieutenant in the Cavalry Special Reserve, attached to the Dragoon Guards. He was awarded the Military Cross in 1918. On 1 April 1920 he relinquished his commission and was granted the rank of captain. During the Second World War he served as Area Flour Officer for South East Division.

Before and after the First World War Charles worked for Pillman & Philips, established by his father in 1885 to import flour from Canada to feed the growing London population. He married Agnes Hastings in 1918, the daughter of one of the Canadian mill owners. They had three sons, all of whom were educated at Tonbridge School. During World War II two of his sons, Charles Hastings Pillman and Robert Pillman, joined the 4/7 Royal Dragoon Guards and trained together for D-Day. Robert was killed six weeks before D-Day when he stood on a landmine while playing golf. Charles Hastings was killed on D-Day after dismounting from his tank, by a shell from HMS Orion. Losing two sons within two months was a tragedy from which Charles and his wife never recovered.

== Rugby career ==
=== First internationals ===
Charles "Cherry" Pillman first played rugby as a schoolboy for Tonbridge School and Sidcup before joining Blackheath. It was at Blackheath that Pillman developed his style of play that defined him as one of the greatest wing forwards of his generation. Pillman's tactical play which included the introduction of detaching himself from the pack when opponents heeled the ball, attacking the opposing fly-half before passing movements could be initiated, brought him to the attention of the English selectors.

Pillman made his first appearance for the England national side in the opening match of the 1910 Five Nations Championship. The match was against Wales, who England had failed to beat in the last twelve years, and was the first international at the new home of English rugby, Twickenham. Pillman played an important role in an inexperienced pack, which saw England take an early lead which they defended stoutly in the later stages, winning the game 11–6. Pillman remained in the England side for the rest of the Championship, a draw against Ireland and wins over both France and Scotland, which saw him part of his first Five Nations winning team.

=== British Isles tour ===
In the summer of 1910 Pillman was selected to tour South Africa with the British Isles team. Pillman's techniques and style drew much interest in South Africa, and he was carefully studied by the Springbok's team. The hard sunbaked ground suited his fast running play, and he was a first choice player for the touring British team.

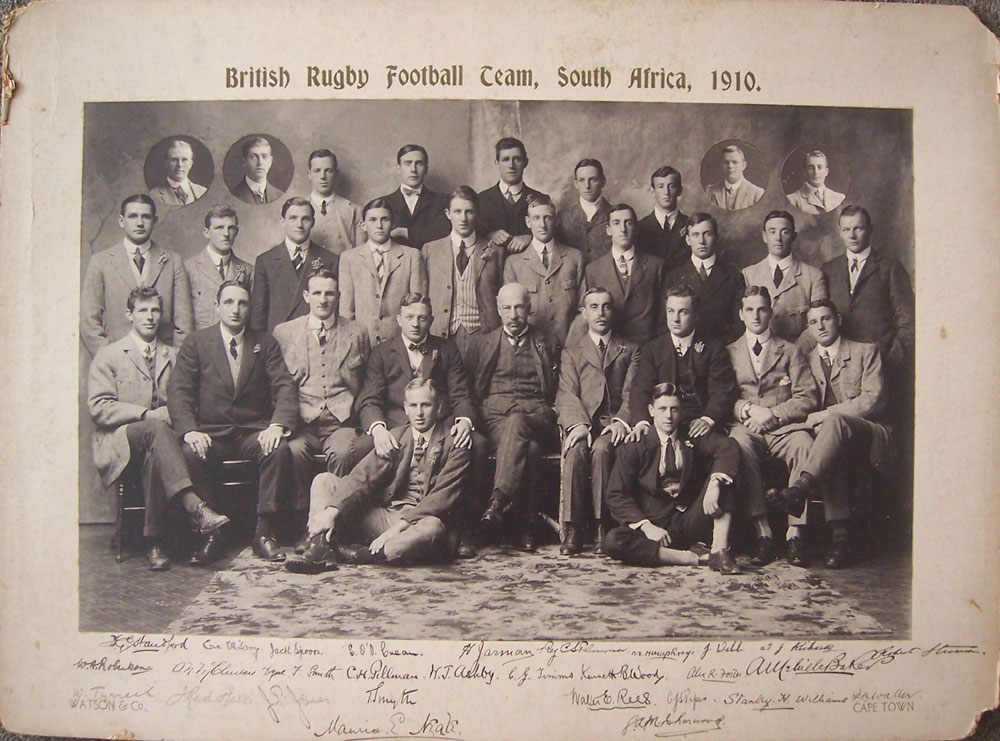
1910 British Isles team, Pillman is middle row fourth from left.

His first game of the tour, played on 11 June, was against the South Western Districts side, which the British won 14–4. Despite not being a recognised kicker, Pillman was given that duty, and he scored his first points of the tour converting one of the team's four tries. Pillman was then selected for four matches against varying Western Province combination teams over eleven days. Pillman scored a try against Western Provonce County, a conversion and a penalty against Western Province Town and then a try and conversion against the full Western Province team. Leading up to the first Test against the South Africa national side, the British Isles played 16 games against regional and invitational teams, Pillman played in twelve of them, picking up 59 points. His twelfth game, played against Griqualand West on 23 July, would be Pillman's last until 20 August, missing seven games through injury. During that period he missed the first Test match against South Africa, which the tourist lost.

Pillman returned to the British team for the second Test. Played at Port Elizabeth, Pillman dominated the match, brought in at fly half. In an outstanding display he manufactured both the British tries and converted the second, earning his first international points. Such was the impact that Pillman had on the Test, that the South African captain Billy Millar later wrote:

"I assert confidently that if ever a man can have been said to have won an international match through his unorthodox and lone-handed efforts, it can be said of the inspired black-haired Pillman I played against on the Crusaders' ground on 27 August 1903, when the "Rover" played as fly half, mark you, not as forward."

While Springbok's rugby legend Danie Craven stated that Pillman "must be looked upon as one of the originators of what became known as the loose forward."

Pillman was available for the third and final Test against the South African's but this time he was back in the pack. The tourists struggled losing 21–5, the British points coming from a Jack Spoors try which Pillman converted. He finished the tour as the tourist's top scorer with 65 points – six tries, three penalties and 19 conversions.

=== England career 1911 – 1914 ===
On returning to Britain, Pillman found himself back in the England team and he was selected for the opening game of the 1911 Five Nations Championship. Played away to Wales at St. Helen's, Pillman found himself on the losing side for the first time in his career, with Wales winning 15–11. Despite the loss, Pillman's place was secure and he held his position to face the first France team to play at Twickenham. The match was a sporting disaster for the French in a game remembered for Douglas Lambert's record 22 points. Pillman was also on the score sheet, scoring two tries from the forward position. England ended the tournament with an away loss to Ireland and a victory over Scotland, Pillman playing in both, to finish mid table in the Championship.

Pillman played only two games of the 1912 Championship. He was part of the opening game against Wales, which resulted in an 8–0 win, Pillman setting up the first try by Henry Brougham. Although missing the Ireland and Scotland encounters, he was back for the game against France. England won the game comfortably scoring four tries, one of which Pillman converted. England ended the tournament joint top with Ireland, giving Pillman his second Five Nations title.

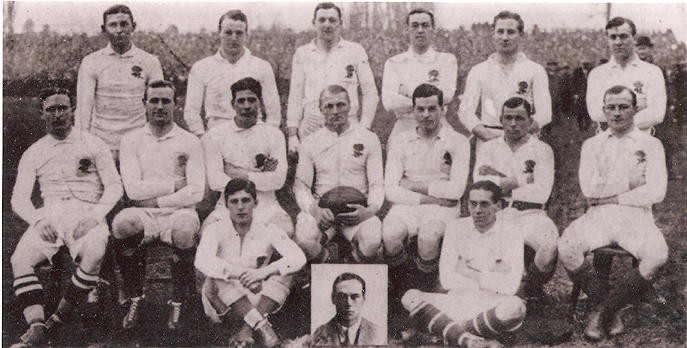
The England team that faced South Africa in 1913, Pillman is back row, first left.

1913 saw the second touring South African team come to Britain. On 4 January, England played South Africa at Twickenham and Pillman was selected to face the Springbok's for the third time. Although England took an early lead, the South Africa pack slowly gained dominance over their England counterparts, and took the lead in the second half. Pillman had a good game, stopping the South African wing, Jan Stegmann from scoring through a timely intercept. The game ended 9–3 to the tourists.

1913 was Pillman's most successful as an England player. He was a constant presence in the England pack throughout the 1913 Five Nations Championship, a campaign which saw England list their first Grand Slam title by beating all four opponents. Pillman was central to the England victory, scoring a try against Wales, two more against France and another in the match away to Ireland. If it had not been for Victor Coates, the Bath wing, who scored six tries, Pillman would have been his team's top scorer that year, and all from the forward position.

Pillman ended his international career, the next year, playing in three matches of the 1914 Five Nations Championship. In the opening game of the tournament against Wales, Pillman and Cambridge wing Cyril Lowe attacked the Welsh backs with sparkling runs, which put the Welsh under constant pressure. Pillman then set up a try for Bruno Brown, and followed this with his own try when Wales fumbled the ball near their own line. England won the game 10–9. This was followed by victories over Ireland and Scotland giving England their successive Triple Crown titles. Pillman scored his final international points in the win over Ireland, with a try started by a run in their own half from his captain, Ronald Poulton-Palmer. Pillman may have played in the final game of the Championship, a win over France, but he suffered a broken leg during the Scotland match. His place was taken by his brother, Robert Pillman, who gained his one and only cap in the encounter.

With the outbreak of World War I international rugby was halted, and Pillman never represented his country again.

=== International matches played ===
With England

- France 1910, 1911, 1912, 1913
- Ireland 1910, 1911, 1913, 1914
- Scotland 1910, 1911, 1913, 1914
- South Africa 1913
- Wales 1910, 1911, 1912, 1913, 1914

With the British Isles

- South Africa 1910, 1910

=== Club career ===
At club level, Pillman started playing at Sidcup, where His Father was a Member and elder Brother (Joseph.H) was Captain, and would also be first capped by Kent (v Eastern Counties 15th Jan 1908) before being prised away by Blackheath for the start of the 1908 season. With the end of World War I Pillman returned to Blackheath and was made captain for the 1919–20 season. With a lack of quality players caused by the events of the war, Pillman was central to rebuilding the Blackheath team, his popularity and patience with the younger members helping the club regain its high standing in club rugby.

As well as club rugby, Pillman played for invitational tourists the Barbarians, joining in the 1909/10 season and scoring a try in the 1911 encounter with Swansea. He also played county rugby for London Counties, playing alongside his brother Robert in a famous victory over the touring South Africans in 1912. As a captain in the British Army, he also represented the 'Mother Country' side that played in the King's Cup tournament in 1919. He was part of the team that lost to New Zealand Army at Inverleith.

== Bibliography ==
- Griffiths, John (1982). The Book of English International Rugby 1872–1982. London: Willow Books. ISBN 0002180065.
- Griffiths, John (1990). British Lions. Swindon: Crowood Press. ISBN 1-85223-541-1.
