= 1916 in Wales =

- Centuries: 18th; 19th; 20th; 21st
- Decades: 1890s; 1900s; 1910s; 1920s; 1930s
- See also: List of years in Wales; Timeline of Welsh history 1916 in The United Kingdom Scotland Elsewhere

This article is about the particular significance of the year 1916 to Wales and its people.

== Incumbents ==
- Archdruid of the National Eisteddfod of Wales – Dyfed
- Lord Lieutenant of Anglesey – Sir Richard Henry Williams-Bulkeley, 12th Baronet
- Lord Lieutenant of Brecknockshire – Joseph Bailey, 2nd Baron Glanusk
- Lord Lieutenant of Caernarvonshire – John Ernest Greaves
- Lord Lieutenant of Cardiganshire – Herbert Davies-Evans
- Lord Lieutenant of Carmarthenshire – John William Gwynne Hughes
- Lord Lieutenant of Denbighshire – William Cornwallis-West
- Lord Lieutenant of Flintshire – Henry Gladstone, later Baron Gladstone
- Lord Lieutenant of Glamorgan – Robert Windsor-Clive, 1st Earl of Plymouth
- Lord Lieutenant of Merionethshire – Sir Osmond Williams, 1st Baronet
- Lord Lieutenant of Monmouthshire – Ivor Herbert, 1st Baron Treowen
- Lord Lieutenant of Montgomeryshire – Sir Herbert Williams-Wynn, 7th Baronet
- Lord Lieutenant of Pembrokeshire – John Philipps, 1st Viscount St Davids
- Lord Lieutenant of Radnorshire – Powlett Milbank
- Bishop of Bangor – Watkin Williams
- Bishop of Llandaff – Joshua Pritchard Hughes
- Bishop of St Asaph – A. G. Edwards (later Archbishop of Wales)
- Bishop of St Davids – John Owen

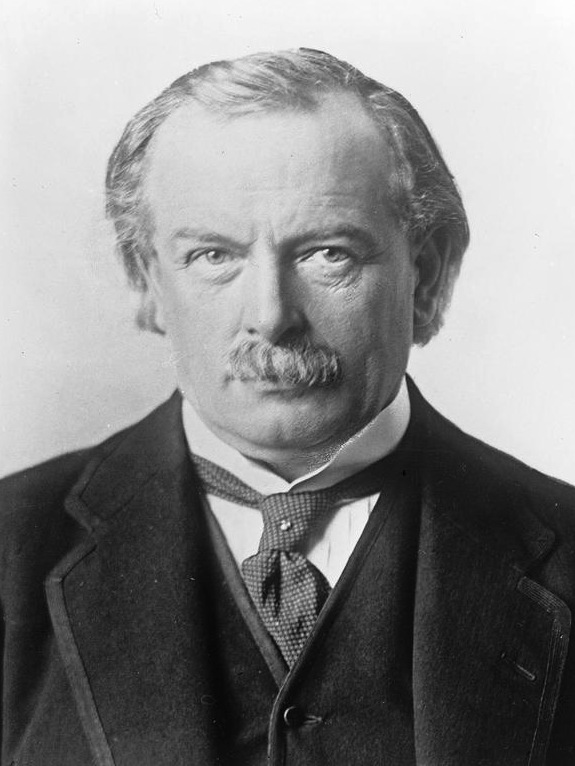
Lloyd George in 1916

== Events ==
- 1 January
  - The Port Eynon life-boat capsizes and three crew members die.
  - The Royal laryngologist John Milsom Rees is knighted.
- 8 January – The Apostolic Church in Wales is established.
- 2 February – Submarine HMS J4 is launched at Pembroke Dock.
- 7 February – The Roman Catholic archdiocese of Cardiff is established.
- 1 March – Transfer of the National Library of Wales at Aberystwyth into its purpose-built premises is completed.
- 3 March – Light cruiser HMS Cambrian is launched at Pembroke Dock.
- 31 May–1 June – Hugh Evan-Thomas distinguishes himself in the Battle of Jutland; he is later knighted.
- 1 June – Miners' wages in the South Wales Coalfield are increased by 15%.
- 11 June – Frongoch internment camp is used as a place of imprisonment for approximately 1,800 Irishmen involved with the Easter Rising.
- 4 July – Royal Welch Fusiliers Lieutenant Siegfried Sassoon attacks a German trench single-handed, and records the outcome in his memoirs.
- 7–12 July – The 38th (Welsh) Division loses so many men in the Mametz Wood engagement during the Battle of the Somme that it is unable to re-group for a year.
- 12 July – Railway worker James Dally is awarded the Edward Medal by King George V for his actions in saving a colleague from falling from the Crumlin Viaduct.
- July – Jimmy Thomas becomes General Secretary of the National Union of Railwaymen, which he had been instrumental in forming.
- October – T. E. Lawrence is sent into the desert to report on the Arab nationalist movements.
- 7 November – Charles Evans Hughes loses narrowly to Woodrow Wilson in the United States presidential election.
- November – Christopher Williams visits the scene of the Welsh losses at Mametz Wood and later paints his famous The Welsh at Mametz Wood at the request of David Lloyd George.
- 1 December – Government takes control of mines in the South Wales Coalfield.
- 2 December – Miners' wages in the South Wales Coalfield are again increased by 15%.
- 7 December
  - David Lloyd George is the first (and, as of a century later, only) Welshman to become Prime Minister of the United Kingdom.
  - David Alfred Thomas is created Baron Rhondda. He is appointed President of the Local Government Board.

== Awards ==
- National Eisteddfod of Wales (held in Aberystwyth)
  - Chair - J. Ellis Williams, "Ystrad Fflur"
  - Crown - withheld

== New books ==
- Llewelyn Powys and John Cowper Powys - Confessions of Two Brothers
- Richard Hughes Williams (Dic Tryfan) - Tair Stori Fer

== Film ==
- 22 April – Edmund Gwenn makes his screen debut in The Real Thing at Last.

== Sport ==
- Boxing: 14 February – Jimmy Wilde wins the British flyweight title at Liverpool.

== Births ==
- 26 February - Joan Strothers (later Lady Curran), scientist (died 1999)
- 2 March - Eddie Watkins, rugby player (died 1995)
- 1 May - Glenn Ford, Welsh-Canadian actor (died 2006)
- 6 May - Ted Peterson, British baseball player (died 2005)
- 7 May - Huw Wheldon, broadcaster (died 1986)
- 8 May - Sylvia Sleigh, painter (died 2010)
- 22 May - Rupert Davies, actor (died 1976)
- 3 July - Nigel Heseltine, writer (died 1995)
- 23 August - Willie Davies, Wales international rugby union and league player (died 2002)
- 29 August - Rhydwen Williams, poet, novelist and minister (died 1997)
- 13 September - Roald Dahl, novelist (died 1990)
- 14 September - Cledwyn Hughes, politician (died 2001)
- 24 September - W. J. Gruffydd (Elerydd), poet and Archdruid (died 2011)
- 31 October - Stan Trick, cricketer (died 1995)

== Deaths ==
- 12 March - Llywarch Reynolds, solicitor and Celtic scholar, 72
- 14 March - Lou Phillips, Wales international rugby player, 38 (killed in action)
- 18 March - David Cuthbert Thomas ("Dick Tiltwood"), soldier, 21 (killed in action)
- 14 April - Charlie Pritchard, Wales international rugby player, 32 (killed in action)
- May - John Griffiths, mathematician, 79
- 5 June - James Williams, footballer, 32 (killed in action)
- 26 June - Henry Allan Rolls, younger brother and heir presumptive of 2nd Baron Llangattock, 44
- 27 June - Sarah Jane Rees (Cranogwen), writer and temperance activist, 78
- 7 July - Dick Thomas, Wales international rugby player, 32 (killed in action at Mametz Wood, during the Somme)
- 12 July - Johnnie Williams, Wales international rugby player, 34 (died of wounds received at Mametz, on the Somme)
- 14 July - David Watts, Wales international rugby player, 30 (killed in action)
- 30 July - Eveline Willett Cunnington, social reformer in New Zealand, 67
- 3 September - Horace Thomas, Wales international rugby player, 26 (killed in action)
- 11 September - Thomas Lemuel James, Welsh-American banker and U.S. Postmaster-General, 85
- 28 September (in Bath, Somerset) - Richard Thomas, industrialist, 78
- 7 October - Leigh Richmond Roose, footballer, 38 (killed in action)
- 11 October - David Richard Thomas, clergyman and historian, 83
- 31 October - John Rolls, 2nd Baron Llangattock, 46 (killed in action)
- 12 November - Sir Walter Morgan, 1st Baronet, banker and Lord Mayor of London, 85
- 14 November - William Davies, footballer, 61

== See also ==
- 1916 in Ireland
