= Pillman =

Pillman is a surname. Notable people with the surname include:

- Brian Pillman (1962–1997), American professional wrestler
- Brian Pillman Jr. (born 1993), American professional wrestler
- Charles Pillman (1890–1955), English rugby union player
- Robert Pillman (1893–1916), English rugby union player
