= George Littlewood Hirst =

Wales international rugby union player (1890–1967)

George Hirst
- Born: George Littlewood Hirst; 5 May 1890 Dowlais, Wales
- Died: 30 July 1967 (aged 77) Abergavenny, Wales
- School: Emanuel School, Wandsworth
- Notable relative(s): Geoff Hirst, son

Rugby union career
- Position: Wing
Amateur team(s)
Years	Team	Apps	(Points)
- Pontypool RFC
1910-1914	Newport RFC		
1919	Barbarian F.C.		
International career
Years	Team	Apps	(Points)
1912-1914	Wales	6	(17)

George Littlewood Hirst (5 May 1890 – 30 July 1967) was a Welsh international rugby union player. He was educated at Emanuel School in London and played club rugby for Pontypool and Newport and invitational rugby for the Barbarians.

== Rugby career ==
Hirst made his debut for Wales on 3 February 1912 against Scotland. Under the captaincy of Dicky Owen, Wales won the game 21-6, with Hirst and fellow debutant Reggie Plummer scoring a try each. Hirst had difficulty holding his role in the Welsh team, and was replaced by Bryn Lewis and later Billy Geen. Hirst recovered his place the next year when he was again selected to face Scotland in the 1913 Five Nations Championship. Hirst was again on the winning team, but found himself dropped once more. In the 1914 Championship Hirst managed to hold down the role on the wing when he played in all four matches, losing only once, in the opening game against England. During the tournament, Hirst scored a further two tries and two drop goals.

Hirst's international career was cut short by the outbreak of World War I, but he returned to rugby when the war ended. He played in two matches for the Barbarians in 1919 before he sustained a broken leg in a charity game that ended his playing career.

=== International games played ===
Wales

- England 1914
- Ireland 1914
- France 1914
- Scotland 1912, 1913, 1914

== Bibliography ==
- Parry-Jones, David (1999). Prince Gwyn, Gwyn Nicholls and the First Golden Era of Welsh Rugby. Bridgend: seren. ISBN 1-85411-262-7.
- Smith, David; Williams, Gareth (1980). Fields of Praise: The Official History of The Welsh Rugby Union. Cardiff: University of Wales Press. ISBN 0-7083-0766-3.
