= Percy Jones (rugby union) =

- Born: Percy Llewellyn Jones; 23 March 1887 Pontypridd, Wales
- Died: 31 March 1969 (aged 82) Deal, Kent, England

Rugby union career
- Position: Lock
Amateur team(s)
| Years | Team | Apps | (Points) |
- Tredegar RFC
| 1906-1921 | Newport RFC | | |
| – | Pontypool RFC | | |
| – | Treorchy RFC | | |
| – | Caerphilly RFC | | |
| – | Rhydyfelin RFC | | |
| – | London Welsh RFC | | |
International career
| Years | Team | Apps | (Points) |
| 1912-1914 | Wales | 8 | (0) |

Percy Jones (23 March 1887 – 31 March 1969) was a Welsh international rugby union forward who played club rugby for Pontypool and Newport. He was awarded eight caps for Wales and faced the touring with South Africans. Jones was one of the 'Terrible Eight' who clashed with the Irish forwards during the 1914 Five Nations Championship.

== Rugby career ==
Jones played for several rugby clubs but was selected for Welsh international duty while with Newport and Pontypool. His first cap was against the 1912 touring South Africans and although Wales lost the game, he was reselected a few months later to face England in the 1913 Five Nations Championship. Under the captaincy of Tommy Vile, Wales lost on home soil for the first time against England since 1895. The selectors kept faith with Jones, and played in two of the next three games of the tournament, which saw wins for Wales and Jones against Scotland and France.

In 1914, Jones was selected to play in all four matches of that year's Championship. Wales only lost one game, narrowly against eventually Grand Slam champions England. Jones was best known during this campaign for the buildup to the match against Ireland. The match was to be played at the Balmoral Showgrounds in Belfast on 14 March, and the Welsh team had travelled out to Ireland the day before. Jones and fellow Newport team mate Harry Uzzell decided to visit a local theatre in the night before the match. There they were met by some of the Irish players, where they were approached by Ireland's William Tyrrell, later to become Air Vice Marshal Sir William Tyrell, Surgeon to George VI, who challenged Jones to a physical contest on the pitch the next day. What appeared to start as good natured banter turned into a full-blooded contest during the match. Jones took several early knocks, not just from Tyrrell but from other members of the Irish pack. At half time Uzzell decided to pay the Irish back and the game descended into running fist fights and the match is remembered as being one of the most violent in international rugby. The Welsh forwards were dubbed the 'Terrible Eight' by the press after the event.

=== International matches played ===
Wales

- England 1913, 1914
- France 1913, 1914
- Ireland 1914
- Scotland 1913, 1914
- South Africa 1912

== Bibliography ==
- Godwin, Terry (1984). The International Rugby Championship 1883-1983. London: Willows Books. ISBN 0-00-218060-X.
- Smith, David; Williams, Gareth (1980). Fields of Praise: The Official History of The Welsh Rugby Union. Cardiff: University of Wales Press. ISBN 0-7083-0766-3.
