= 1913 in Wales =

- Centuries: 18th; 19th; 20th; 21st
- Decades: 1890s; 1900s; 1910s; 1920s; 1930s
- See also: List of years in Wales; Timeline of Welsh history 1913 in The United Kingdom Scotland Elsewhere

This article is about the particular significance of the year 1913 to Wales and its people.

== Incumbents ==
- Archdruid of the National Eisteddfod of Wales – Dyfed
- Lord Lieutenant of Anglesey – Sir Richard Henry Williams-Bulkeley, 12th Baronet
- Lord Lieutenant of Brecknockshire – Joseph Bailey, 2nd Baron Glanusk
- Lord Lieutenant of Caernarvonshire – John Ernest Greaves
- Lord Lieutenant of Cardiganshire – Herbert Davies-Evans
- Lord Lieutenant of Carmarthenshire – Sir James Williams-Drummond, 4th Baronet (until 15 June); John William Gwynne Hughes (from 15 September)
- Lord Lieutenant of Denbighshire – William Cornwallis-West
- Lord Lieutenant of Flintshire – William Glynne Charles Gladstone
- Lord Lieutenant of Glamorgan – Robert Windsor-Clive, 1st Earl of Plymouth
- Lord Lieutenant of Merionethshire – Sir Osmond Williams, 1st Baronet
- Lord Lieutenant of Monmouthshire – Godfrey Morgan, 1st Viscount Tredegar (until 11 March) Ivor Herbert, 1st Baron Treowen (from 4 April)
- Lord Lieutenant of Montgomeryshire – Sir Herbert Williams-Wynn, 7th Baronet
- Lord Lieutenant of Pembrokeshire – John Philipps, 1st Viscount St Davids
- Lord Lieutenant of Radnorshire – Powlett Milbank
- Bishop of Bangor – Watkin Williams
- Bishop of Llandaff – Joshua Pritchard Hughes
- Bishop of St Asaph – A. G. Edwards (later Archbishop of Wales)
- Bishop of St Davids – John Owen

== Events ==
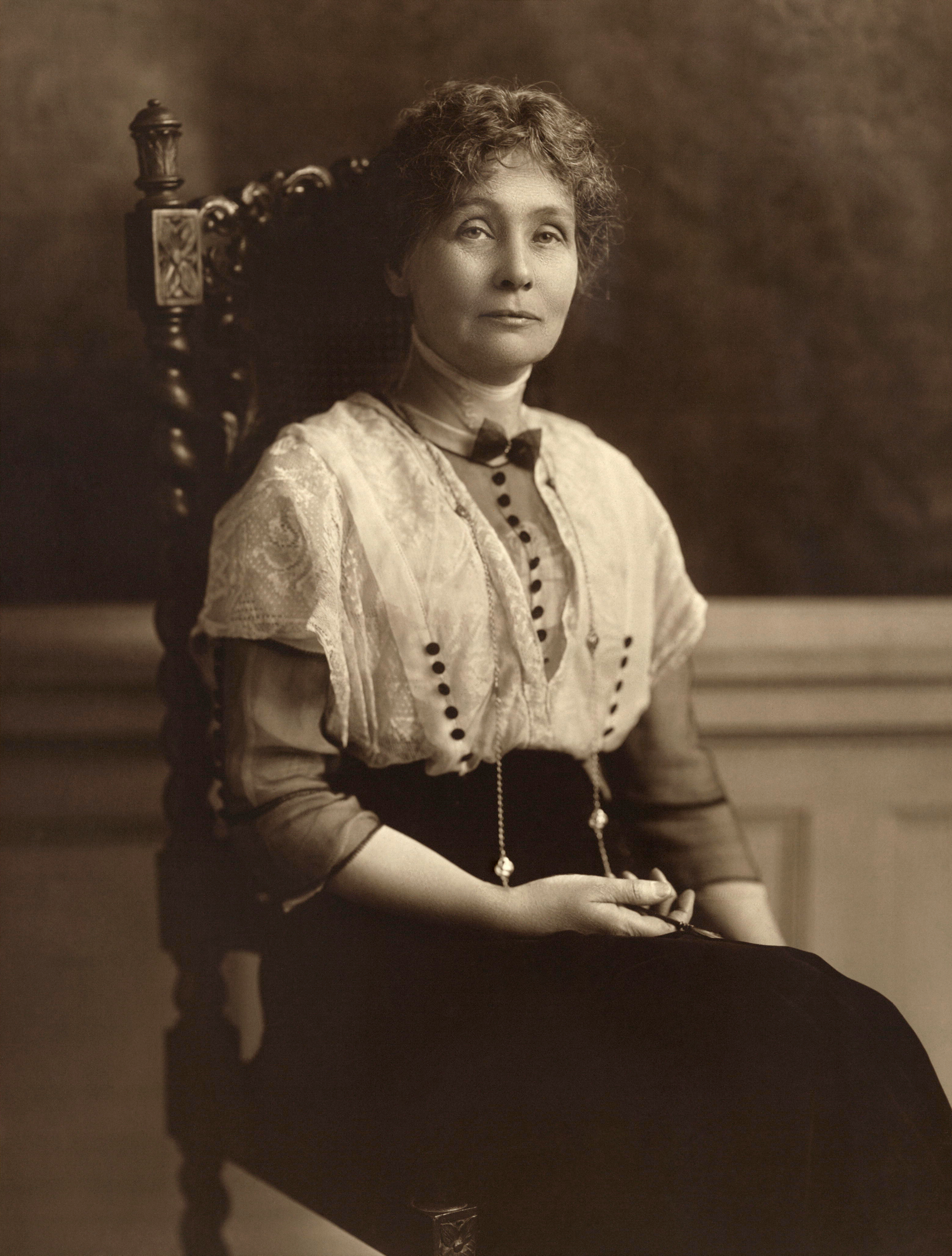
Mrs Pankhurst speaks in Cardiff

- 19 February - Suffragette arson attack on a house being built for David Lloyd George near Walton Heath Golf Club in Surrey. Emmeline Pankhurst, in a speech in Cardiff this evening, claims to have incited this and other incidents.
- 5 June - The last ship built at Porthmadog, Y Gestiana, is launched; on 4 October she is wrecked on her maiden voyage, on the coast of Nova Scotia.
- 14 June - Three years after leaving Cardiff on her fateful voyage to the Antarctic, Captain Robert Falcon Scott's ship Terra Nova returns to the port, commanded by Scott's former comrade Teddy Evans.
- 14 October - Senghenydd Colliery Disaster: 439 men are killed in a mining accident at Universal Colliery, Senghenydd - the worst accident in British mining history. 1913 is the peak year for coal production in Wales.
- 27 October - A tornado hits South Wales, killing four people.
- Diplomat William Henry Hoare Vincent is knighted.
- Carmarthen Farm Institute is founded - the first of its kind.
- Monmouthshire Training College is founded at Caerleon, with Edward Anwyl as its first principal.
- School of Mines founded at Treforest, a predecessor of the University of South Wales.

== Arts and literature ==
=== Awards ===
- National Eisteddfod of Wales - held in Abergavenny
  - Chair - Thomas Jacob Thomas, "Aelwyd y Cymro"
  - Crown - William Evans (Wil Ifan)

=== New books ===
==== English language ====
- Sabine Baring-Gould - Lives of the British Saints, volume 4
- W. H. Davies - Foliage
- Frances Hoggan - American Negro Women During Their First Fifty Years of Freedom
- Thomas Gwynn Jones - Cofiant Thomas Gee
- Sir John Morris-Jones - Welsh Grammar: Historical and Comparative
- Edward Thomas - The Happy-Go-Lucky Morgans

==== Welsh language ====
- T. Gwynn Jones - Brethyn Cartref
- Moelona - Teulu Bach Nantoer

=== Music ===
- Robert Griffith - Llyfr Cerdd Dannau
- Morfydd Llwyn Owen - Nocturne (Charles Lucas Medal)

== Film ==
- The American adaptation of Ivanhoe is filmed at Chepstow Castle.

== Sport ==
- Boxing
  - 2 June - Bill Beynon wins the British and Empire bantamweight championship.
- Rugby Union
  - 18 January - Wales are defeated 12–0 by England in a game played at the National Stadium, Cardiff

== Births ==
- 7 March – E. Gwyndaf Evans, poet and archdruid (died 1986)
- 13 March – Tessie O'Shea, entertainer and actress (d. 1995)
- 29 March - R. S. Thomas, poet (d. 2000)
- 31 March - Dai Rees, golfer (died 1983)
- 8 May - Tom Rees, Wales international rugby player (d. 1991)
- 27 May - Mervyn Stockwood, Anglican bishop (d. 1995)
- 5 June - Moelwyn Merchant, poet and novelist (d. 1997)
- 15 June - Sir James Hamlyn Williams-Drummond, Lord Lieutenant of Carmarthenshire, 56
- 6 July - Gwyn Thomas, author (died 1981)
- 23 July - Michael Foot, politician, MP for Ebbw Vale 1960-1992 (died 2010)
- 7 September - William "Wendy" Davis, Wales international rugby player (d. 2002)
- 2 October - Vivian Ridler, printer (died 2009)
- 18 December - Eddie Morgan, Wales international rugby player (d. 1978)

== Deaths ==
- 4 February - Tom Williams, Wales international rugby player and sports administrator, c.52
- 8 February - James Webb, Wales rugby international, 50
- 16 February (in Australia) - Lewis Thomas, colliery proprietor and politician, 80
- 11 March - Godfrey Charles Morgan, 1st Viscount Tredegar, British Army officer, politician and philanthropist, 81
- 19 March - John Thomas (Pencerdd Gwalia), harpist, 87
- 30 March - Sidney Herbert, 14th Earl of Pembroke, politician, 60
- 3 April (in London) - Henry Matthews, 1st Viscount Llandaff, politician, 87
- 15 April - William Jones, Victoria Cross recipient, c.73
- 4 June (in London) - Stuart Rendel, 1st Baron Rendel, politician, 78
- 24 July - Hugh Brython Hughes, children's author, 65
- 17 August - Harry Bowen, Wales international rugby player, 49
- 22 September - Emmeline Lewis Lloyd, alpine mountaineer, 85
- c. 8 October - John Jones (Coch Bach y Bala), notorious criminal, c.59
- 6 November - Sir William Henry Preece, electrical engineer, 79
- 7 November (in Broadstone, Dorset) - Alfred Russel Wallace, scientist, 90
- 19 December (in South Africa) - Bert Gould, Wales international rugby player, 43
- date unknown - Thomas Thomas (apTommas), harpist and younger brother of John Thomas, 82/3

== See also ==
- 1913 in Ireland
