= Walter Martin (rugby union) =

Wales international rugby union player

- Born: Walter John Martin; 14 May 1883 Woodford, England
- Died: 30 April 1933 (aged 49) Newport, Wales
- School: Newport High School
- University: University College, Cardiff

Rugby union career
- Position: Fly-half
Amateur team(s)
| Years | Team | Apps | (Points) |
| 1904-1921 | Newport RFC | | |
| – | Monmouthshire | | |
International career
| Years | Team | Apps | (Points) |
| 1912-1919 | Wales | 3 | (0) |

Walter John Martin DCM (born 14 May 1883 in Woodford, England) was a Wales international rugby union player. He played club rugby predominantly for Newport, captaining the side and played county rugby for Monmouthshire. While playing for Newport, Martin faced the three major Southern Hemisphere teams, Australia, South Africa and New Zealand. At international level he represented Wales on three occasions.

== Club career ==
Martin joined Newport Rugby Club in 1904, and during his career would captain the club during one of the most successful era's for the club. At Newport he formed an incredibly successful partnership with Tommy Vile, and they would face the touring New Zealanders, South Africans and Australians together.

== International career ==
Martin made his debut for Wales against Ireland at the Balmoral Showgrounds on 9 March 1912 as part of the Five Nations Championship. In an inexperienced team, Martin was one of seven new caps, under the captaincy of Jack Bancroft, and although leading at half time the team lost 12-5. Despite the loss, Martin was back for the next match, and this time finished on the winning side. Martin did not play for Wales the next season, but was back after the First World War, in a game against the New Zealand Army, which is now recognised as an international game. Martin was not the first choice in the New Zealand game, as the selectors had chosen Cardiff's Clem Lewis, but Lewis had picked up an injury playing for the British Army team. Martin was drafted in as a late replacement but during the game injured his head saving a try. Martin was removed from play, but later recovered and resumed the game, although his play was not as strong after the event. Martin's three caps were all played in partnership with Newport team mate, Tommy Vile.

=== International games played ===
Wales

- Ireland 1912
- France 1912
- New Zealand Army 1919

== Military service and later life ==
In World War I Martin served in the South Wales Borderers and was awarded the Distinguished Conduct Medal for his actions during the war. On his return he rejoined Newport and worked for Great Western Railway at Newport Docks, but in 1933 he was diagnosed with terminal cancer. Martin, who had suffered from depression, hanged himself while receiving treatment as a long term patient at St Woolos Hospital on 30 April 1933.

== Bibliography ==
- Billot, John (1972). All Blacks. Ferndale: Ron Jones Publications.
- Smith, David; Williams, Gareth (1980). Fields of Praise: The Official History of The Welsh Rugby Union. Cardiff: University of Wales Press. ISBN 0-7083-0766-3.

Rugby Union Captain
| Preceded by Tommy Vile | Newport RFC Captain; 1912-1913 | Succeeded by Harry Uzzell |
