= List of Leicester Tigers records and statistics =

This article collates key records and statistics relating to Leicester Tigers, including information on honours, player appearances, points and tries, matches, sequences, internationals, season records, opponents and attendances.

== Honours ==
Tigers first silverware was the Midlands Counties Cup, Tigers entered this competition from 1881 to 1914. There were then no competitions until 1971 when the RFU Knockout Cup started. Tigers won this for the first time in 1979, the competition continued until 2005 when it was replaced by the Anglo-Welsh Cup which Tigers have won three times, a record since the re-launch and addition of Welsh sides. The league started in 1987 and Tigers were the inaugural champions of England, a play off for the title was introduced in 2003. Leicester hold the record for most Premiership titles (11), the most consecutive Premiership Final appearances (9) and the most Play off appearances (14). On 18 May 2008 against Gloucester at Kingsholm they were the first team to achieve an away semi-final victory in the Premiership play-offs. They were the first side to retain the Heineken Cup after winning the competition in 2001 and 2002.

1st XV

- Premiership

Champions (11): 1988, 1995, 1999, 2000, 2001, 2002, 2007, 2009, 2010, 2013, 2022
Runners-up (8): 1994, 1996, 2005, 2006, 2008, 2011, 2012, 2025

- European Cup

Champions (2): 2001, 2002
Runners-up (3): 1997, 2007, 2009

- RFU Knockout Cup

Champions (5): 1979, 1980, 1981, 1993, 1997
Runners-up (5): 1978, 1983, 1989, 1994, 1996

- Anglo-Welsh Cup

Champions (3): 2007, 2012, 2017
Runners-up (1): 2008

- European Challenge Cup

Runners-up (1) 2020-21

- Midland Counties Cup

Champions (12) 1898, 1899, 1900, 1901, 1902, 1903, 1904, 1905, 1909, 1910, 1912, 1913
Runners-up (3) 1889, 1891, 1894

Leicester A

- Leicestershire County Cup

Champions (5) 1895, 1896, 1898, 1899, 1902

- Premiership A League

Champions (4) 2005, 2006, 2010, 2011
Runners-up (1) 2007

== Player records ==
=== Appearances ===
Most appearances

- **All-time most appearances**

Current players in bold.

#	Nat.	Pos.	Name	Period	Appearances
1	(England)	FL	David Matthews	1955–1974	502
2	(England)	HK	Sid Penny	1895–1910	491
3	(England)	SH	John Allen	1961–1975	457
4	(England)	HK	Doug Norman	1919–1933	453
5	(England)	CE	Paul Dodge	1975–1993	437
6	(England)	PR	Graham Rowntree	1990–2007	398
7	(England)	FB	Dusty Hare	1976–1989	394
8	(England)	SH	Pedlar Wood	1906–1923	388
9	(England)	N8	Garry Adey	1966–1981	381
10	(England)	FL	John Wells	1982–1998	367

- Most appearances: **502** – David Matthews (29 April 1955 – 23 August 1974)
- Most league appearances: **254** – Dan Cole (13 September 2008 – 14 June 2025)
- Most cup appearances: **51** – Paul Dodge (14 November 1975 – 26 January 1991)
- Most European appearances: **87** – Ben Youngs (17 November 2007 – 5 April 2025)
- Most appearances in a single season: **45** – Teddy Haselmere in 1922/23
- Most successive appearances: **109** – David Matthews (14 January 1961 – 7 December 1963)
- Most appearances in cup finals: **13** – Geordan Murphy
- Most appearances as captain:

#	Nat.	Pos.	Name	Period	Appearances	Wins	Win %
1	(England)	LK	Martin Johnson	1995–2005	**202**	146	72.3
2	(England)	WG	Percy Lawrie	1911–1923	**165**	107	64.8
3	(England)	FB	Arthur Jones	1896–1904	**131**	99	75.6
3	(England)	HK	Peter Wheeler	1973–1981	**131**	90	68.7
5	(England)	FH	Les Cusworth	1985–1990	**130**	101	77.7

Youngest and oldest appearances

- Longest spell at club: **27 years 169 days** – Graham Willars (17 October 1959 – 4 April 1987)
- Youngest first-team player: **16 years 52 days** – Martinus Swain (v Harlequins, 28 December 1895)
- Youngest player in competitive game: **16 years 237 days** – George Ford (v Leeds in Anglo-Welsh Cup, 8 November 2009)
- Oldest first-team player: **47 years 135 days** – Graham Willars (v Waterloo RFC, 4 April 1987)
- Oldest player in competitive game: **40 years 109 days** – Brad Thorn (v Bath in Premiership Rugby, 23 May 2015)
- Oldest debutant: **39 years 243 days** – Brad Thorn (v Gloucester, 4 October 2014)

=== Try and points scorers ===
Top try scorers

- **Top 10 all-time top tryscorers** Current players in **bold**.

#	Nat.	Pos.	Name	Period	Tries	Apps	Try Ratio
1	(England)	WG	Percy Lawrie	1907–1924	206	318	0.648
2	(England)	WG	Barry Evans	1981–1996	170	273	0.623
3	(Ireland)	WG	John Duggan	1969–1980	158	302	0.523
3	(England)	WG	Bob Barker	1968–1980	158	320	0.494
5	(England)	WG	Harry Wilkinson	1895–1905	153	233	0.657
6	(England)	WG	Teddy Haselmere	1918–1924	136	180	0.756
7	(England)	WG	Rory Underwood	1983–1997	134	236	0.568
8	(England)	FL	Neil Back	1990–2005	125	339	0.369
9	(England)	FL	David Matthews	1955–1974	119	502	0.237
10	(England)	CE	Ralph Buckingham	1924–1935	117	325	0.360

- Most tries: **206** – Percy Lawrie
- Most league tries: **75** – Neil Back
- Most cup tries: **31** – Harry Wilkinson
- Most European tries: **25** – Geordan Murphy
- Most tries in a game by a player: **7** – Alastair Smallwood (versus Manchester R.F.C. on 30 December 1922)
- Most tries scored in a single season: **59** – Teddy Haselmere in 1919–20
- Most tries scored in a season of Premiership Rugby or National League Division 1: **16** – Neil Back (1998–99)
- Most tries scored in a calendar year: **46** – Teddy Haselmere in 1920
- Most tries scored on debut: **3** – 7 players, most recently Marika Vunibaka (versus Loughborough Students, on 14 November 1997)

Other try-scoring records

- Most consecutive games with a try scored: **8** – Percy Lawrie (19 November 1911 – 28 December 1911)
- Most hat-tricks (or better): **17** – Teddy Haselmere
- Youngest try-scorer: **17 years, 1 month** – Charles Wynne (v Birkenhead, 26 December 1913)
- Youngest try-scorer in a competitive match: **18 years, 89 days** – Ollie Smith (v Gloucester in 2000–01 Tetley's Bitter Cup, 11 November 2000)
- Oldest try-scorer: **42 years +** – Jesse Ball (v Wortley, 4 April 1896)
- Oldest try-scorer in a competitive match: **39 years, 307 days** – Brad Thorn (v Toulon in 2014–15 Champions Cup, 7 December 2014)
- Quickest try: **14 seconds** – John Duggan (v Moseley, 22 April 1978)
- Quickest hat-trick: **8 minutes** – Peter Sandford (v Nuneaton, 20 February 1993)

Top points scorers

Note: Points recorded at contemporary values. See History of rugby union#Method of scoring and points for history of how points values have changed.

- **Top 10 all-time points scorers** Current players in **bold**.

#	Nat.	Pos.	Name	Period	Apps.	Tries	Cons.	Pens	Drop goals	Marks	Total points
1	(England)	FB	Dusty Hare	1976–1989	394	87	779	820	47	0	4,507
2	(England)	FB	John Liley	1988–1997	230	74	417	449	2	0	2,518
3	(England)	FH	Andy Goode	1998–2008	200	29	275	335	33	0	1,799
4	(England)	FB	Tim Stimpson	1998–2004	151	29	223	372	2	0	1,713
5	(England)	FH	Toby Flood	2008–2014	119	25	199	270	1	0	1,336
6	(England)	FH	George Ford	2009–2022	128	10	198	257	9	0	1,244
7	(England)	FH	Jez Harris	1984–1996	225	23	165	178	70	0	1,171
8	(England)	CE	Harold Day	1918–1929	212	108	281	81	4	2	1,151
9	(England)	WG	Bob Barker	1968–1980	320	158	92	107	2	0	1,117
10	(England)	FH	Les Cusworth	1978–1990	365	66	100	65	96	0	947

- Most points: **4,507** – Dusty Hare
- Most league points: **1,180** – Tim Stimpson
- Most cup points: **531** – Dusty Hare
- Most European points: **406** – Andy Goode
- Most points in a game by a player: **43** – Dusty Hare (v Birmingham on 17 September 1986
- Most points in a Premiership Rugby game: **32** – Tim Stimpson (v Newcastle on 21 September 2001)
- Most points scored in a single season: **486** (9t, 57c, 109p) – Tim Stimpson in 2000–01
- Most points scored in a season of Premiership Rugby or National League Division 1: **321** – Tim Stimpson (1999–2000)
- Most points scored in a calendar year: **451** – Tim Stimpson in 2001
- Most points scored on debut: **27** – Rob Liley (v Boroughmuir on 25 August 1996)

Other point-scoring records

- Youngest points scorer: **16 years, 237 days** – George Ford (v Leeds, Anglo-Welsh Cup, 8 November 2009)
- Oldest points scorer: **46 years +** – Jesse Ball (v Belgrave St Peters, 11 March 1899)
- Oldest points scorer in a competitive match: **39 years, 307 days** – Brad Thorn (v Toulon, 2014–15 Champions Cup, 7 December 2014)
- Quickest points scorer: **12 seconds** – Jez Harris (drop goal, v Northampton, 1993–94 Courage League, 8 January 1994)
- Most times scoring all of Leicester's points: **41 games** – Dusty Hare
- Most successive points scoring games: **118 games** – Dusty Hare (17 December 1983 – 4 August 1987)

=== Internationals ===
Italics denotes also national record.

- Most international caps won while at Leicester: **129** – Ben Youngs (127 England, 2 Lions)
- Most England international caps won while at Leicester: **127** – Ben Youngs
- Most Scotland international caps won while at Leicester: **16** – Jim Hamilton
- Most Wales international caps won while at Leicester: **27** – Tommy Reffell
- Most Ireland international caps won while at Leicester: **72** – Geordan Murphy
- Most British and Irish Lions international caps won while at Leicester: **8** – Martin Johnson
- Most international caps won while at Leicester for a non-British or Irish nation: **63** – Martin Castrogiovanni for Italy
- Most international tries scored while at Leicester: **50** – Rory Underwood (49 for England, 1 for Lions)

=== Awards ===
World Rugby Hall of Fame

The following people associated with club have been inducted into the World Rugby Hall of Fame.

- Tony O'Reilly – inducted in 2009
- Martin Johnson – inducted in 2011
- Clive Woodward – inducted in 2011
- Bob Dwyer – inducted in 2011
- Waisale Serevi – inducted in 2013
- Wavell Wakefield – inducted in 2015

World Rugby Junior Player of the Year

- George Ford – 2011

==== Premiership Rugby Awards ====
The following players and coaches have received awards at the end of the Premiership Rugby season, or its predecessor.

Player of the Season

- Martin Johnson – 1996–97, 1998–99
- Neil Back – 1997–98
- Austin Healey – 1999–2000
- Pat Howard – 2000–01
- Martin Corry – 2004–05
- Martin Castrogiovanni – 2006–07
- Tom Youngs – 2012–13

Discovery of the Season Awarded to those players under 23 years old

- Lewis Moody – 2001–02
- Ollie Smith – 2004–05
- Tom Varndell – 2005–06
- Ben Youngs – 2009–10
- Manu Tuilagi – 2010–11
- Ellis Genge – 2016–17

Director of Rugby of the Season

- Dean Richards – 2000–01
- John Wells – 2004–05
- Pat Howard – 2006–07
- Richard Cockerill – 2008–09
- Steve Borthwick — 2021–22

==== Rugby Players' Association Awards ====
Players' Player of the Season

- Neil Back – 1998–99
- Martin Corry – 2004–05
- Thomas Waldrom – 2010–11
- Vereniki Goneva – 2013–14
- Telusa Veainu – 2017–18
- Jasper Wiese – 2022–23

Players' Young Player of the Season

- Harry Ellis – 2004–05
- Tom Varndell – 2005–06
- Ben Youngs – 2009–10
- Manu Tuilagi – 2010–11
- Freddie Steward – 2021–22

== Team records ==
=== Matches ===
- First match: Leicester 0–0 Moseley, Belgrave Road Cycle and Cricket Ground, 28 October 1880
- First competitive match: Edgbaston Crusaders 1 goal, 2 tries to 0 Leicester, Edgbaston, 22 October 1881 in the Midlands Counties Cup
- First RFU Knock-out Cup match: Nottingham 10–3 Leicester, Ireland Avenue, 21 November 1971
- First Courage League match: Leicester 24–13 Bath, Welford Road, 12 September 1987
- First European Cup match: Leinster 10–27 Leicester, Donnybrook, 16 October 1996

==== Record wins ====
- Biggest win: 100–0 (v Liverpool St Helens, 11 April 1992)
- Biggest league win: 83–10 (v Newcastle, 19 February 2005)
- Biggest cup win: 76–0 (v Exeter, 1992–93 Pilkington Cup quarter-final, 27 February 1993)
- Biggest European Cup win: 90–19 (v Glasgow, 1997–98 Heineken Cup quarter-final play off, 1 November 1997)

==== Record defeats ====
- Biggest defeat: 10–85 (v Barbarians, 4 June 2000)
- Biggest league defeat: 0–45 (v Bath, 20 September 2014)
- Biggest cup defeat: 7–47 (v London Irish, 1999–2000 Tetley's Bitter Cup Round 5, 29 January 2000)
- Biggest European Cup defeat: 12–80 (v Toulouse, 2024–25 European Rugby Champions Cup pool stage, 19 January 2025)

==== Other match records ====
- Highest scoring draw: 41–41 (v Gloucester, 2010–11 Premiership, 16 April 2011)
- Highest scoring European Cup draw: 32–32 (v Ospreys, 2009–10 Heineken Cup pool stage, 11 October 2009)
- Highest scoring cup draw: 28–28 (v Sale, 2003-04 Powergen Cup round 6, 15 November 2003, lost 28-43 in extra time)

High scores and bonus points

- Most points scored
  - In a win: 100 (v Liverpool St Helens, 11 April 1992)
  - In a defeat: 42 (v Barbarians, 17 March 2006)
- Most points conceded
  - In a win: 37 ( v West Hartlepool, 1998–99 Premiership, 16 May 1999)
  - In a defeat: 85 (v Barbarians, 4 June 2000)
- Highest combined points: 109 (72–37 win v West Hartlepool, 1998–99 Premiership, 16 May 1999; and 90–19 v Glasgow in 1997–98 Heineken Cup quarter-final play off, 1 November 1997)
- Most tries scored: 19 (v Bedford, 15 February 1919 and v Liverpool St Helens, 11 April 1992)
- Most tries conceded: 13 (v Barbarians, 4 June 2000)
- Quickest bonus point try scored: 15 minutes 54 seconds by Harry Simmons (v Ampthill, Welford Road, 24 September 2023)

==== Sequences ====
Longest unbeaten run

- Overall: 22 (all wins, 17 November 1995 to 17 April 1996)
  - Home: 42 (all wins, 22 January 2000 to 15 May 2002)
  - Away: 10 (all wins, 17 February 1995 to 11 November 1995)

Longest losing run

- Overall: 9 (27 September 1947 to 15 November 1947)
  - Home: 6 (28 January 1937 to 6 March 1937)
  - Away: 13 (27 October 1926 to 16 April 1927) and (3 October 1970 to 10 April 1971)

Longest winless run

- Overall: 13 (6 October 1888 to 22 December 1888)
  - Home: 7 (24 December 1892 to 11 February 1893)
  - Away: 15 (14 January 1928 to 8 December 1928)

=== Individual Seasons ===
- Most games played in a season: 46 (in 1923–24, 1966–67, 1972–73 and 1996–97)
- Most wins in a season: 35 (in 46 games, 1996–97 season)
- Most league wins in a season: 22 (in 26 games, 1998–99 season)
- Fewest wins in a season: 5 (in 27 games, 1889–90 season)
- Fewest league wins in a season: 7 (in 22 games, 2018–19 season)
- Most defeats in a season: 24 (in 32 games, 2018–19 season)
- Most league defeats in a season: 15 (in 22 games, 2018–19 season)

=== Opponents and Familiarity ===
All stats correct up to 7 November 2026

- Club played most often: 264 v Northampton Saints (won 148, drawn 19, lost 97)
- Club played most often in the league: 77 v Bath
- Club played most often in domestic cup: 16 v Bath
- Club played most often in European Cup: 16 v Leinster
- Non-home ground Leicester have played on most often: 124 at Franklin's Gardens, Northampton
- Player who has played the most games against one opponent for Leicester: 31 by Sid Penny against Coventry
- Player who has played the most games against Leicester: 38 by Simon Shaw for Bristol, Wasps and Barbarians

=== Home attendances ===
Note: Records relate to Welford Road unless otherwise stated

- Highest home attendance: 35,000 v the All Blacks on 4 October 1924
- Highest home league attendance: 25,849 (first occasion v Northampton Saints, 9 January 2016)
- Highest home European Cup attendance: 32,500 v Bath (at Walkers Stadium, 2005–06 Heineken Cup quarter-final, 1 April 2006)
- Highest home cup attendance: 25,849 v Northampton Saints (2016–17 Anglo-Welsh Cup pool stage, 28 January 2017)
- Highest average attendance for a league season: 22,889 (2016–17 Premiership)
