= Edgar Morgan =

Edgar Morgan may refer to:

- Edgar Morgan (rugby union, born 1882) (1882–1962), Welsh rugby union footballer of the 1900s and 1910s
- Edgar Morgan (rugby, born 1896) (1896–1983), Welsh rugby union and rugby league international of the 1920s
