= 1924–25 Rugby Union County Championship =

English rugby union competition

1924–25 County Championship
- Countries: England
- Champions: Leicestershire (1st title)
- Runners-up: Gloucestershire

The 1924–25 Rugby Union County Championship was the 32nd edition of England's premier rugby union club competition at the time.

Leicestershire won the competition for the first time after defeating Gloucestershire in the final.

== Final ==
28 March 1925

Gloucestershire	6–14	Leicestershire
Try: Taylor, Pickles		Try: Bryson, Holder; Con: x1 Pen: Day; Drop: x1

Memorial Ground, Bristol
Referee: Albert Freethy (Neath)

T Millington	Gloucester
T Spoors	Bristol
Reg Pickles	Bristol
L Corbett	Bristol
E Hughes	Gloucester
Dr Taylor	Gloucester
R Milliner	Gloucester
Tom Voyce	Gloucester
F Ayliffe	Gloucester
S Duberley	Gloucester
F Ford	Gloucester
M Shaw	Bristol
A Hore	Bristol
F Coombes	Cinderford
W Preece	Bream

L Sambrook	Leicester
A Smallwood	Leicester
Harold Day	Leicester
O Bryson	Leicester
H Sambrook	Leicester
M Holden	Leicester
R Buckingham	Leicester
G German	Leicester
G Ward	Leicester
J Lawrie	Leicester
G Beamish	Leicester
H Sharratt	Leicester
Doug Prentice	Leicester
D Norman	Leicester
N Thorneloe	Leicester

== See also ==
- English rugby union system
- Rugby union in England
