= Stan Trick =

Stan Trick may refer to:

- Stanley Arthur Trick (1884–1958), English cricketer for Essex
- William Mervyn Stanley Trick (1916–1995), Welsh cricketer for Glamorgan
