= Bryn Lewis =

Wales international rugby union footballer

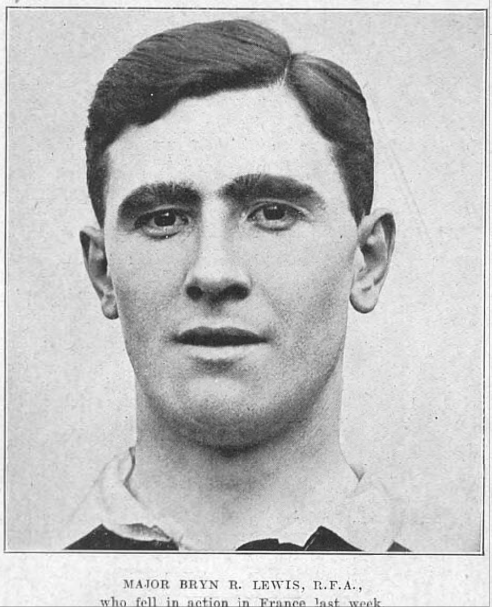
- Born: Brinley Richard Lewis; 4 January 1891 Pontardawe, Wales
- Died: 2 April 1917 (aged 26) Ypres, Belgium
- School: Swansea Grammar School
- University: Cambridge University

Rugby union career
- Position: Wing
Amateur team(s)
Years	Team	Apps	(Points)
- Pontardawe RFC
- Cambridge University R.U.F.C.
- Swansea F.C.
- London Welsh RFC
1912–1913	Barbarian F.C.		
International career
Years	Team	Apps	(Points)
1912–1913	Wales	2	(6)

Major Brinley Lewis (4 January 1891 – 2 April 1917), known as Bryn Lewis, was a Welsh international rugby union wing who played club rugby for Newport and Cambridge University. He is one of twelve Welsh internationals to have died in active duty during World War I.

== Rugby career ==
Lewis was born in Pontardawe, Wales but was educated at Swansea Grammar School and represented the Wales Schoolboy team. He later attended Cambridge University and while at university gained three 'Blues' when he was selected for three consecutive Varsity games from 1909 to 1911. Lewis gained his first cap for Wales against Ireland as part of the 1912 Five Nations Championship.

The Welsh team was inexperienced and lost the game 12–5, not helped when Lewis's teammate Tom Williams broke his arm and continued playing in the second half of the game. Lewis was back the next year in the 1913 Championship, for his second and last cap, again against Ireland. Lewis scored two tries in the game which saw Wales win narrowly. A scorer of one of the Irish tries in that game, Albert Stewart, would like Lewis, die in action in World War I.

=== International matches played ===
Wales

- Ireland 1912, 1913

== Military career ==
During the First World War, Lewis was a Major in 'B Battery' of the 122nd Brigade of the 38th (Welsh) Infantry Division, and was mentioned in Despatches. He was killed in action at Ypres on 2 April 1917, after the enemy shelled the rear of B Battery, hitting the mess where Lewis was situated, killing him instantly. He is buried at Ferme-Oliver Cemetery.

== Bibliography ==
- Godwin, Terry (1984). The International Rugby Championship 1883-1983. London, UK: Willows Books. ISBN 0-00-218060-X.
- Smith, David; Williams, Gareth (1980). Fields of Praise: The Official History of The Welsh Rugby Union. Cardiff: University of Wales Press. ISBN 0-7083-0766-3.
