= David Watts (rugby union) =

Wales international rugby union footballer (1886–1916)

- Born: David Watts; 14 March 1886 Maesteg, Wales
- Died: 14 July 1916 (aged 30) Bazentin, France
- Occupation: collier

Rugby union career
- Position: Lock
Amateur team(s)
Years	Team	Apps	(Points)
–	Maesteg RFC		
International career
Years	Team	Apps	(Points)
1914	Wales	4	(0)
- Military career
- Allegiance: United Kingdom

David Watts (14 March 1886 – 14 July 1916) was a Welsh international rugby union forward who played club rugby for Maesteg. He won four caps for Wales, all in 1914.

== Rugby career ==
Watts came to prominence in Welsh rugby when he was part of the Maesteg team that won the Glamorgan Challenge Cup in 1912. In 1914 Watts was selected to represent Wales as part of the Five Nations Championship. His first game was on the 17 January in a game against England at Twickenham. Under the captaincy of Jenkin Alban Davies, Wales lost the opening game but won the final three games of the tournament. Of all Watts' matches, the most notable was the final game at the Balmoral Showgrounds against Ireland. The game was an overly violent affair, after members of both packs ran into each other the night before the game. The Welsh pack, of which Watts was part of, was named the 'Terrible Eight' by newspapers after the game. Watts played one final game for his country, in an exhibition game against the Barbarians in 1915. Again led by Alban Davies, Watts turned out in the match played to boost recruitment for the Welsh Guards, though the game is not recognised as a full international.

The game against Ireland was the final Welsh international game before the outbreak of World War I. During the war Watts joined the King's Shropshire Light Infantry as part of the 7th Battalion, reaching the rank of corporal. He was killed in action at Bazentin Ridge in France in 1916.

== International matches played ==
Wales

- England 1914
- France 1914
- Ireland 1914
- Scotland 1914

== Bibliography ==
- Smith, David; Williams, Gareth (1980). Fields of Praise: The Official History of The Welsh Rugby Union. Cardiff: University of Wales Press. ISBN 0-7083-0766-3.
