= Ivor Davies (rugby union, born 1892) =

Welsh rugby union player

- Born: Ivor Thomas Davies; 6 April 1892 Carmarthen, Wales
- Died: 2 July 1959 (aged 67) Hampstead, England

Rugby union career
- Position: wing
Amateur team(s)
Years	Team	Apps	(Points)
- Carmarthen Quins RFC
–	Llanelli RFC		
–	London Welsh RFC		
International career
Years	Team	Apps	(Points)
1914	Wales	3	(6)

Ivor Thomas Davies (6 April 1892 – 2 July 1959) was a Welsh international rugby union player who played club rugby predominantly for Llanelli. Davies earned three caps for Wales before his career was disrupted by the outbreak of the First World War, in which he served.

== Personal history ==
Davies was born in Carmarthen in 1892. He was educated at Queen Elizabeth Grammar School then St David's College School in Lampeter before matriculating to St David's College. A civil servant by profession with the outbreak of the First World War he joined the British Army. Davies served in both the 2nd Dragoon Guards (Queen's Bays) and the Machine Gun Corps.

== Rugby career ==
Davies began playing rugby as a youth and represented Queen Elizabeth Grammar School as well as St David's College School. On joining St Davids College he was selected for the college team, and on leaving found a place in the first team of Carmarthen Quins RFC. He was later picked up by Llanelli RFC, from which he was selected for the Wales national team. His first international match was against Scotland as part of the 1914 Five Nations Championship. He scored his first international points on his debut with a try as Wales won convincingly 24–5 against the Scots. Davies played in two more matches for Wales, the final two games of the 1914 Championship, against Ireland and France. Davies may have played more games for Wales, but his career was halted by the outbreak of the First World War. Before retiring, Davies turned out for London Welsh RFC.

=== International games played ===
Wales

- Ireland 1914
- France 1914
- Scotland 1914

== Bibliography ==
- Smith, David; Williams, Gareth (1980). Fields of Praise: The Official History of The Welsh Rugby Union. Cardiff: University of Wales Press. ISBN 0-7083-0766-3.
