= Joe Brunton =

English rugby union player (1888–1971)

Joe Brunton DSO MC
- Full name: Joseph Brunton
- Born: 21 August 1888 Tynemouth, England
- Died: 18 September 1971 (aged 83) Hammersmith, England

Rugby union career
- Position: Second row
International career
Years	Team	Apps	(Points)
1914	England	3	(0)

Lieutenant colonel Joseph Brunton (21 August 1888 – 18 September 1971) was an English international rugby union player, referee and administrator.

Born in Tynemouth, Brunton was a solidly-built forward with North Durham and earned his first representative honours as a member of the Northumberland county side in 1912. He featured in the second row for England in the three of their four matches of the 1914 Five Nations Championship, to help secure the grand slam.

Brunton was an officer with the Northumberland Fusiliers during World War I, receiving a Military Cross (and bar), as well as the Distinguished Service Order, for gallantry shown on the Western Front. In 1919, Brunton featured on the "Mother Country" (British Army) team which played a series of Inter-Service matches.

Retiring as a player in 1920, Brunton subsequently became a referee and oversaw a 1924 match between the All Blacks and Wales at Swansea. He served a term as president of the Rugby Football Union in 1953–54.

== See also ==
- List of England national rugby union players
