= Harold Day (sportsman) =

England international rugby union player & referee

- Born: Harold Lindsay Vernon Day; 12 August 1898 Darjeeling, Bengal Presidency, British India
- Died: 15 June 1972 (aged 73) Hadley Wood, Hertfordshire, England

Rugby union career
- Position(s): Full-back; Wing
Senior career
Years	Team	Apps	(Points)
1918–29	Leicester Tigers	212	(1,151)
International career
Years	Team	Apps	(Points)
1920-26	England	4	(16)
- Cricket career

Cricket information
- Batting: Right-handed
- Bowling: Unknown

Domestic team information
- Years: Team
- 1920–1921: Bedfordshire
- 1922–1931: Hampshire

Career statistics
Competition	First-class
Matches	80
Runs scored	3,142
Batting average	25.33
100s/50s	4/18
Top score	142
Balls bowled	36
Wickets	0
Bowling average	–
5 wickets in innings	–
10 wickets in match	–
Best bowling	–
Catches/stumpings	27/–
- Source: Harold Day at Cricinfo

Harold Lindsay Vernon Day (12 August 1898 — 15 June 1972) was an English rugby union footballer and a first-class cricketer. After serving in the First World War with the Royal Artillery, he played domestic rugby predominantly for Leicester Tigers from 1918 to 1929, becoming their record points scorer. He also earned four Test caps for England, scoring 16 points. Following the end of his playing career, he became an international rugby union referee. As a first-class cricketer for Hampshire, he made 78 appearances as a batsman, scoring over 3,100 runs and making four centuries. Alongside a career in teaching, Day was also a rugby union and cricket journalist for The Daily Telegraph.

== Early life and WWI service ==
Day was born on 12 August 1898 in British India at Darjeeling. He was educated in England at Bedford Modern School, where he excelled in track sports, holding the school record for the long jump. He left Bedford at the height of the First World War and went straight to the Royal Military Academy at Woolwich, graduating from there into the Royal Artillery (RA) as a second lieutenant in November 1916, before being promoted to lieutenant in May 1918. He was seriously wounded in action during the war, and following the end of the war in November 1918 he was posted to Leicestershire. There he resigned his commission in the RA to take up a career in teaching.

== Sporting career ==
=== Rugby union ===
Whilst serving in Leicestershire with the RA, Day began his association with Leicester in 1918. He played as a full-back or winger in a Leicester career which lasted until 1929 and encompassed 212 appearances, during which he scored a then-club record 1,151 points including 108 tries, 281 conversions, 81 penalty goals, 4 drop goals and 2 goals from a mark. His record points tally was later overhauled by Dusty Hare in the 1970s. Alongside playing for Leicester, he also captained Leicestershire to victory in the final of the 1924–25 County Championship against Gloucestershire, in addition to representing the British Army. Considered at the time to be one of the greatest kickers of a rugby ball, he was known for his great power and accuracy, with an ability to score drop-goals from half-way. His presence in the Leicester team was known to attract large crowds, sometimes swelling gate attendances by up to 2,000 at Welford Road.

It was whilst representing the Army that he gained his first Test caps for England against Wales at Swansea in the 1920 Five Nations Championship, in somewhat unusual circumstances. W. M. Lowry was originally selected to play on the wing and was photographed with the team, but was replaced by Day just before kick-off, with the selectors feeling that the conditions would suit Day better. He ended up scoring and converting England's only try of the game. On the back of strong performances for Leicester, he earned his second and third Test caps in the 1922 Five Nations Championship, playing against Wales at Cardiff Arms Park (in which he scored a try) and France at Twickenham. Ahead of the fixture against France, Day had his kit stolen during lunch and had to borrow kit from his teammates, which was ill-fitting and led to discomfort whilst playing. Despite this, Day played an important part in denying the French what would have been a famous victory, by kicking one conversion and scoring two penalties. He gained his final cap for England in the 1926 Five Nations Championship against Scotland.

After his playing career ended, he became a well respected international rugby union referee.

=== Cricket ===
Day played minor counties cricket for Bedfordshire in 1920 and 1921, making four appearances in the Minor Counties Championship. Beginning in 1922, he began an association with Hampshire, for whom he made his debut in first-class cricket for against Kent at Southampton in the 1922 County Championship, a match in which he scored 56 and 91. He quickly established himself in the Hampshire side, making seventeen appearances in 1922 and scoring 1,062 runs at an average of 39.33; he scored one century, making 107 against Warwickshire at Southampton, alongside nine half centuries. Earlier in the season against Warwickshire at Edgbaston, he was a member of the Hampshire team which was bowled out for 15 runs in their first innings, but still defeated Warwickshire by 155 runs having followed-on 203 runs behind. Day was still serving in the British Army during the 1922 season, with him making one first-class appearance that season for the British Army cricket team against the Royal Navy at Lord's.

Due to his military duties, Day made just three appearances in the 1923 County Championship, but returned to play regularly for Hampshire in 1924, making 27 first-class appearances. Alongside playing for Hampshire in 1924, he also played for the Gentlemen in the Gentlemen v Players fixture at Blackpool. He passed a thousand runs in a season for the second time, scoring 1,119 runs at an average of 25.43; he made his career-high first-class score in 1924, with 142 against Somerset at Bath, with Day sharing in a fourth wicket stand of 135 with Ronnie Aird. He also made 100 against the touring South Africans in the same season. Thereafter, his appearances for Hampshire were limited by his teaching commitments. In 1925, he played in nine first-class matches, whilst the following season he played in ten; during the latter he made 103 against Middlesex, putting on 210 runs for the fourth wicket with Phil Mead. which was his final first-class century. Day made eight further first-class appearances in 1927, followed by one in 1928. Three years passed before he played for Hampshire in the 1931 County Championship, making four appearances.

Day was noted by Wisden as being a batsman who was able to adapt to the situation of the match, and who possessed a variety of strokes. Whilst a letter submitted to The Times referred to Day as "an attacking batsman". He made 78 appearances for Hampshire, scoring 3,047 runs at an average of 25.18; he made four centuries, alongside seventeen half centuries.

== Personal life and death ==
After retiring from sport, Day became rugby union correspondent and a cricket reporter at The Daily Telegraph. Beginning in 1924, he had been employed by Felsted School as an assistant master, an appointment he still held by 1932. In 1952, he wrote a book on rugby union. He took up golf in later life, reputedly playing to a high standard. Politically, Day was a Conservative. He died suddenly on 15 June 1972 at Hadley Wood, Hertfordshire; an obituary notice had been mistakenly published about Day some years prior to his death.
