= Grand Duet (John Thomas) =

The Grand Duet in E♭ minor by John Thomas is written for two harps. Described as one of John Thomas's best compositions, it consists of three movements:

1. Allegro con brio
2. Adagio
3. Allegro con spirito
