= Robert Pillman =

English rugby union player (1893–1916)

- Born: 9 February 1893 Sidcup, England
- Died: 9 July 1916 (aged 23) Armentieres, France
- School: Rugby
- University: University College London
- Notable relative: Cherry Pillman (brother)
- Occupation: Articled Clerk (trainee Lawyer)

Rugby union career
- Position: Forward
Senior career
Years	Team	Apps	(Points)
- Blackheath
International career
Years	Team	Apps	(Points)
1914	England	1	
- Military career
- Allegiance: United Kingdom
- Branch: British Army
- Service years: 1914−1916
- Rank: Captain
- Unit: Queen's Own Royal West Kent Regiment
- Conflicts: World War I: Western Front; Battle of the Somme; Battle of Albert †

Robert Laurence Pillman (9 February 1893 − 9 July 1916) was an English rugby union player. He was the brother of Cherry Pillman. He played once for England, against France in the 1914 Five Nations Championship. He was killed in action while serving with the British Army during the First World War.

== Early life ==
Robert Pillman was born in Sidcup on 16 February 1893, the third son of Joseph and Mary Anna Pillman. He was educated at Merton Court School, Sidcup, and Rugby School, which he attended from 1907 to 1911. There, he played as a forward in the 1st XV in 1910. Leaving school, he was articled to White and Leonard of Ludgate Circus, London. His older brother was Charles Pillman, who also went on to play for Blackheath and England.

== Rugby career ==
After leaving Rugby, he played at Blackheath, where he gained a reputation for playing hard and being quick on the ball. Pillman played for the London XV that was one of only two teams to beat the South African touring team of 1912–13. Pillman's only appearance for England was against France on 13 April 1914 in the last international rugby match before the First World War. The contemporary rugby journalist E. H. D. Sewell reckoned that Pillman was just at the beginning of a long international rugby career.

=== International appearance ===
Opposition	Score	Result	Date	Venue	Ref(s)
France	13–39	Win	13 April 1914	Colombes	

== Military service ==
At the outbreak of the Great War, Pillman enlisted in the 10th Battalion of the Queen's Own Royal West Kent Regiment, on 1 September 1914. He was made a lance corporal, and then received a commission in July 1915, being promoted to captain in January 1916. His went to the Western Front in May 1916. Pillman volunteered for the role of brigade bombing officer. In preparation for a raid on enemy trenches, he selected 50 men and trained them for several weeks on a replica of the target. He led the assault, which lasted a number of hours, and involved passing through barbed wire defences, and infiltrating the trenches. During this action, he was shot in the thigh and, although he managed to get back to his trenches, he died soon after.

== See also ==
- List of international rugby union players killed in action during the First World War

== Bibliography ==
- Sewell, Edward Humphrey Dalrymple (1919). The Rugby Football Internationals Roll of Honour. London, Edinburgh: T. C. & E. C. Jack.
- McCrery, Nigel (2014). Into Touch: Rugby Internationals Killed in the Great War. Pen and Sword. ISBN 978-1473833210.
