= Bob Barker (rugby union) =

English rugby union player

- Birth name: Robert George Barker
- Date of birth: 23 October 1944 (age 80)
- Place of birth: Leicester, England
- School: Alderman Newton's School
- Occupation(s): Head Teacher

Rugby union career
- Position(s): Wing
Senior career
Years	Team	Apps	(Points)
1968–1979	Leicester Tigers	320	(1,117)

Robert George Barker (born 23 October 1944) is a former rugby union wing who played 320 times for Leicester Tigers between 1968 and 1979. In 1977, he became only the third Leicester player to score 150 tries for the club, and is still joint third in the clubs list of all-time try scorers.

Barker made his Leicester debut against Northampton Saints on 19 October 1968. Despite scoring a try, Barker was not used again until March, when he became more of a regular, featuring in 14 of the last 17 matches that season. Originally a centre, Barker switched to his more common position on the wing during the 1969-70 season, during which he became the club's regular goal kicker and was the season's top scorer with 145 points. In 1971-72, Barker would be the club's top try scorer with 26 in 30 games, a feat he repeated in 1972-73, 73-74, 75-76 and 77-78. On 11 September 1973, Barker scored the winning try as Leicester beat the touring Fiji national team 22-17 at Welford Road, and in 1978, he was part of the Leicester side that reached the 1978 John Player Cup Final, only to lose 6-3 to Gloucester. Barker's late run proved the closest Leicester came to the Gloucester try line. He played for a further two seasons but featured in only 10 more games for the club.

== Sources ==
- Farmer, Stuart; Hands, David (2014). Tigers - Official history of Leicester Football Club. The Rugby Development Foundation. ISBN 978-0-9930213-0-5.
