= Sos Taylor =

England international rugby union player

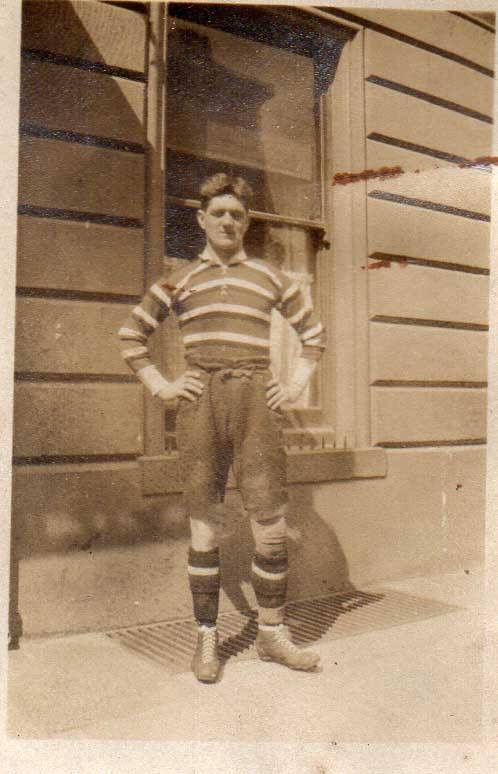
- Born: Frank Taylor; 4 May 1890 Leicester, England
- Died: 22 September 1956 (aged 66) Leicester, England
- Occupation: Clerk in boot factory

Rugby union career
- Position: Lock
Senior career
Years	Team	Apps	(Points)
1911–1924	Leicester Tigers	276	(108)
International career
Years	Team	Apps	(Points)
1920	England	2	(0)

Frank Taylor known as Sos Taylor (4 May 1890 – 22 September 1956) was a rugby union lock or backrow who played 276 games for Leicester Tigers between 1911–1924 and twice for England in 1920.

Taylor made his Leicester debut on 28 January 1911 at Welford Road against Moseley in a 21-5 win for Leicester. Taylor played once more that season, against Newport but did not feature again in the 1910/11 season. The following season Taylor firmly established himself in the side playing 30 of 39 games including the all three games in the Midlands Counties Cup. In 1912/13 season Taylor played 38 times, the joint most of any player that season alongside Pedlar Wood.

Taylor was badly wounded in the First World War whilst serving with the Leicestershire Regiment and told he would never play rugby again. However he recovered sufficiently well to resume his rugby career and make 1919/20 one of the best of his career. Taylor played 30 times for Leicester and on 31 January 1920 made his international debut for England against France at Twickenham.
