= Jan Stegmann =

South African rugby union player

- Full name: Johannes Augustus Stegmann
- Born: 21 June 1887 Bedford, Cape Colony
- Died: 7 December 1984 (aged 97)
- Height: 1.83 m (6 ft 0 in)
- Weight: 84.8 kg (187 lb)

Rugby union career
- Position: Wing three–quarter
Provincial / State sides
Years	Team	Apps	(Points)
- Transvaal
International career
Years	Team	Apps	(Points)
1912–13	South Africa	5	(15)

Johannes Augustus Stegmann (21 June 1887 – 7 December 1984) was a South African rugby union player.

== Biography ==
Stegmann was the ninth born of 13 siblings, which included Springbok Anton. He hailed from Bedford.

A strong–running winger, Stegmann played for Stellenbosch and Johannesburg club Digger. He was a Transvaal representative player when he gained his Springboks call up in 1912, for a tour of Great Britain, Ireland and France. The Springboks won all five international matches, with Stegmann contributing two tries against Scotland, followed a week later by a hat–trick against Ireland at Lansdowne Road. He featured in each of the five internationals.

Stegmann subsequently studied dentistry at the University of Edinburgh and represented Scotland in athletics.

== See also ==
- List of South Africa national rugby union players
