= William Rhys-Herbert =

William Rhys-Herbert

William Rhys-Herbert (1868-1921) was a Welsh composer, conductor, organist and pianist. He composed numerous operettas for performance in schools, and also published songs, partsongs, and cantatas.

== Early life ==
William Rhys Herbert was born in 1868 in Ffwrnas, near Resolven in South Wales. At an early age, like most boys at that time, he went down the local pit, Blaencwm Colliery, but it was obvious that he had great talent musically. He was able to save enough to buy himself a harmonium – the first to come to the village. The Resolven History Society records that "it arrived by train and was carted in style through the streets followed by hordes of children". He became the first organist at Jerusalem Chapel, where a concert was later held to raise funds so that he could study professionally, and he was accepted as a pupil by T. J. Davies Mus. Bac. of Swansea.

At the age of 19 he published his first composition. He then studied with Dr Frederick Karn at the London College of Music, (now part of Thames Valley University), gaining the degree of Mus. Bac. At the age of 22 he left for Canada, and studied at Trinity University, Toronto, (now part of the University of Toronto), where his former teacher, Frederick Karn, was appointed external examiner in 1894. He was awarded a Mus.Doc. by Trinity in 1900.

== United States ==
After moving to the United States in 1899, he was appointed organist at Hennepin Avenue Methodist Church in Minneapolis. In 1911 he became organist and choir director at the Church of the Redeemer, a downtown Minneapolis structure destroyed by fire in 1953 (the congregation is now called the First Universalist Church). Rhys-Herbert also directed the Elks Glee Club and served as principal accompanist to the Apollo Club (now the Apollo Male Chorus from 1905 until his death in 1921.

== Works ==
Many of his more than one thousand compositions are part songs for male voices. Many others are for children. He was well known as an adjudicator at eisteddfodau and as conductor at cymanfaoedd canu across America. He became an American citizen in 1913.

At the heart of his work is a cycle of sacred cantatas – Bethlehem, The Nazarene, Bethany, Calvary and Olivet. By far the most successful was Bethany; first published in 1909, it quickly became his most celebrated piece. It was performed widely in the USA during the 1920s and 30s. After that its popularity seems to have dwindled fairly quickly; however, a performance was given in Houston in 1955. The words of this cantata were written by William ApMadoc, a noted singer, adjudicator, publisher, temperance campaigner and conductor from Chicago, who provided Dr Rhys-Herbert with texts for many other settings in both Welsh and English. ApMadoc also was a native of Glamorgan, he arrived in America in 1878, settling first in Utica, subsequently in Chicago, where he was appointed musical director of the Chicago high schools, holding the title of Professor. In 1893 the World Fair was held in Chicago, an international eisteddfod was included, and an official American branch of the Welsh Gorsedd (subsequently abolished) was established in the city under the aegis of the Cymmrodorion Society of Chicago; ApMadoc was appointed 'Cofiadur' (Bardic Scribe). ApMadoc was also the music critic for The Cambrian, a magazine for Welsh Americans. He died in Chicago in 1916 at the age of 78.

In America, Rhys-Herbert's music has now all but disappeared, and little remains anywhere in print. If he is remembered for anything today, it is most likely to be for his operetta Sylvia, which still has some reputation. Other operettas include Bo'sn's Bride, Bulbul, Captain Van der Hum, A Nautical Knot, The Rivals, The Wild Rose, and Will Tell, which was published posthumously. However, in his hometown of Resolven, he is honoured as one of 'Y Tri Doctoriaid': three Doctors of Music who were born there (the others being Dr David Evans and Dr Tom Hopkin Evans). A concert featuring choral music by all three composers was given in Resolven in November 2008. A vocal duet, 'Ffarwel i'r Gwynt a'r Eira', (with text by ApMadoc) was included in the syllabus for the 2008 Urdd Eisteddfod in Llandudno.

William Rhys-Herbert also wrote choral music and piano sheet music under the pseudonym "W. H. Rees."

He died in Chicago on his fifty-third birthday, October 3, 1921, having reportedly been unwell for one or two weeks previously.

== Sources ==
- Howard, John Tasker (1939). Our American Music: Three Hundred Years of It. New York: Thomas Y. Crowell Company.
- William Rhys Herbert – Welsh-American Composer : Ninnau Vol 35 #5 Sep/Oct 2010 p25
