= John Thomas (harpist) =

Welsh composer and harpist (1826-1913)

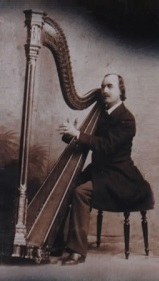

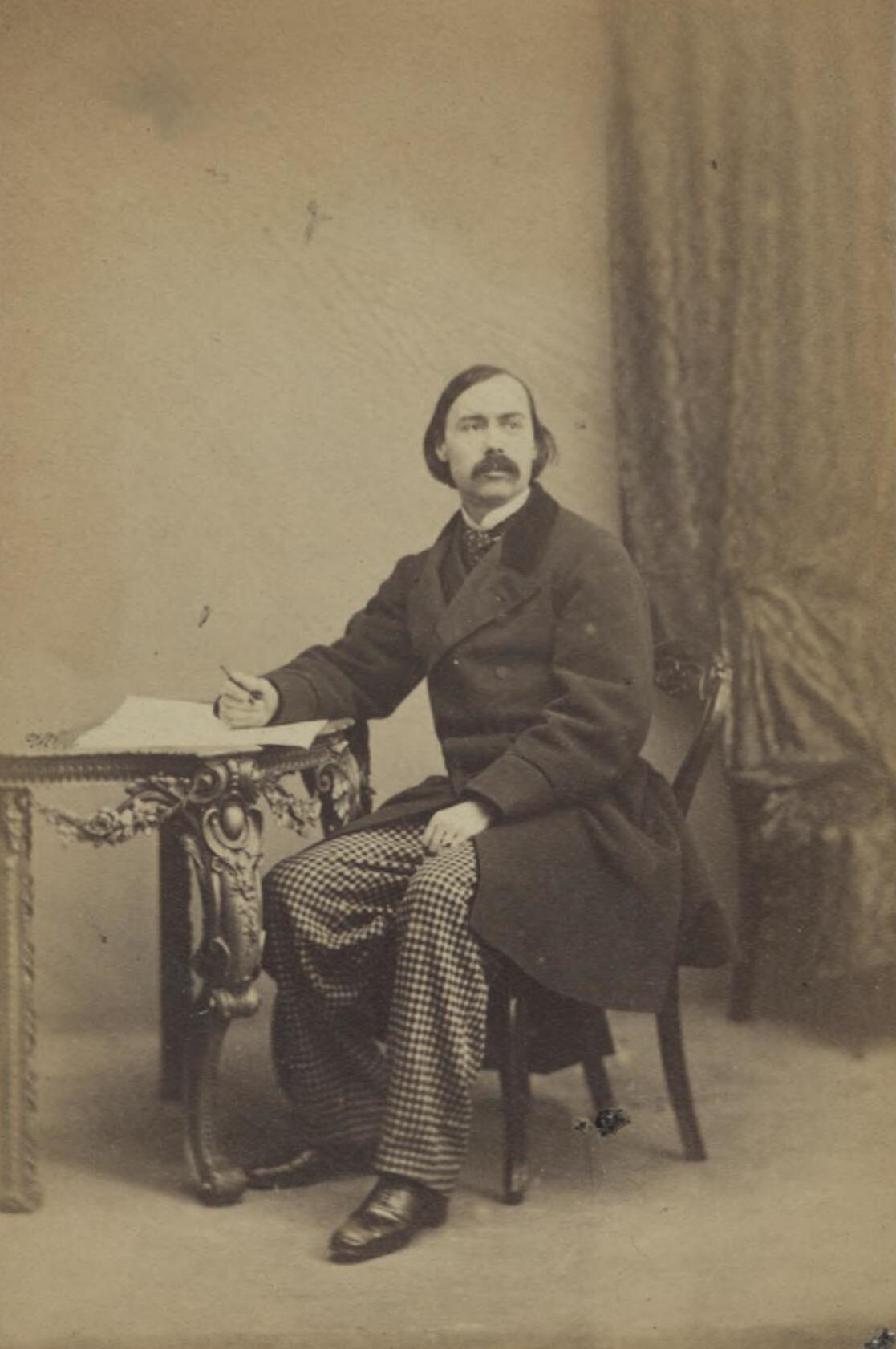
1860s photograph of John Thomas

John Thomas (1 March 1826 – 19 March 1913) was a Welsh composer and harpist. The bardic name Pencerdd Gwalia (Chief of the Welsh minstrels) was conferred on him at the 1861 Aberdare Eisteddfod.

== Life ==
He was born in Bridgend on Saint David's Day, son of a tailor, also named John Thomas, a clarinetist in the amateur town band. He was the eldest of seven children, four of whom also played the harp, most notably his brother Thomas Thomas. John Thomas started off by playing the triple harp, which had three rows of strings. At the age of 14, through the influence of Ada Lovelace, (Lord Byron's daughter), he was admitted to the Royal Academy of Music in London. His teachers there included Cipriani Potter for composition and John Balsir Chatterton for harp.

He taught at the Royal College of Music, where he eventually became professor, and at the Guildhall School of Music. One of his pupils at the Royal College was Gwendolen Mason.

He wrote many pieces for the harp that are popular today and are used in the exam syllabus. He also wrote an opera, a symphony, two harp concertos, overtures, chamber music, and two cantatas – Llewellyn (1863) and The Bride of Neath Valley (1866). He played one of his own harp concertos at a Philharmonic concert in 1852.

In 1861, he was briefly engaged to the Belgian soprano Désirée Artôt. He eventually married twice, both times to former students. His first wife, Alice Ann Keate, died in 1880, two years after their marriage; he married Joan Francis Denny in 1885.

In 1872, he was appointed harpist to Queen Victoria.

== Publications ==
- 1862 Welsh Melodies, with Welsh and English Poetry, vols. 1 & 2, by John Jones (Talhaiarn) & Thomas Oliphant. Author: John Thomas.
- 1870 Welsh Melodies, with Welsh and English Poetry, vol. 3, by John Jones (Talhaiarn) & Thomas Oliphant. Author: John Thomas.
- 1874 Welsh Melodies, with Welsh and English Poetry, vol. 4, by John Jones (Talhaiarn) & Thomas Oliphant. Author: John Thomas.

=== Selected recordings ===
- John Thomas. Harp Music: Scenes of Childhood; Grand Duet; Cambria. Lipman Harp Duo (Naxos, 2007).
- John Thomas. Welsh Music for Voice and Harps: Hela'r sgyfarnog; Gogerddan; La primola; Cambria; Ymadawiad y brenin; Serch hudol; Hob a derry dando; Souvenir du nord; Dadl dau; Bedd Gelert; Thou art the star; L'Adieu. Rachel Ann Morgan, Edward Witsenburg (Globe Classics, 2012).
- John Thomas. Complete Duos for Harp and Piano, vol. 1: Souvenir du nord; Dyddiau Mebyd (Scenes of Childhood); Cambria; Dewch i'r Frwydyr (Come to Battle); Grand Duet in E flat minor; arrangements of Adelaide, Op. 46 (Beethoven); Themes from Carmen (Bizet); Gigue from Water Music (Suite No. 3 in G major by Handel). Duo Praxedis: Praxedis Hug-Rütti (harp); Praxedis Geneviève Hug (piano) (Toccata Classics, 2020).
