= HMS Cambrian (1916) =

British C-class light cruiser

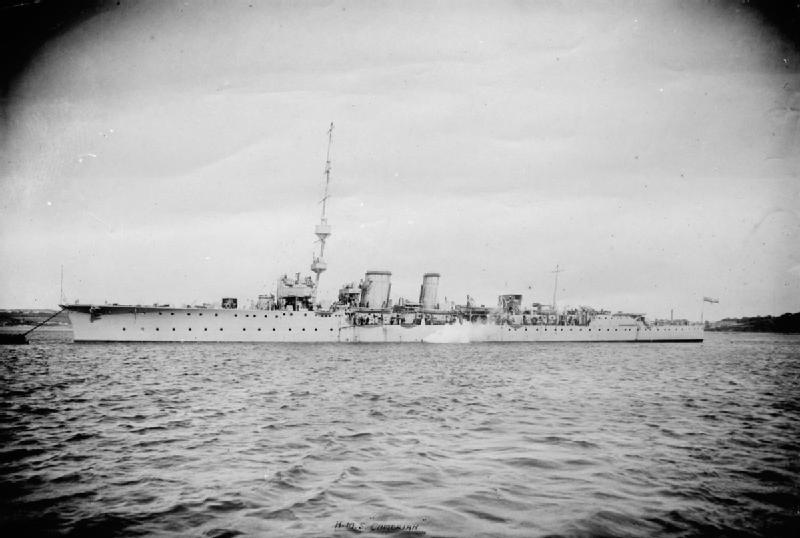
- Cambrian at anchor during World War I

History

United Kingdom
- Name: Cambrian
- Namesake: Cambrian Mountains
- Ordered: September 1914
- Builder: HM Dockyard, Pembroke
- Laid down: 8 December 1914
- Launched: 3 March 1916
- Completed: May 1916
- Commissioned: May 1916
- Decommissioned: June 1924
- Recommissioned: 1926
- Decommissioned: November 1929
- Recommissioned: March 1931
- Decommissioned: July 1933
- Identification: Pennant number: A3 (1914); 25 (Jan 18); 30 (Apr 18); 83 (Nov 19).
- Fate: Sold for scrap, 28 July 1934

General characteristics (as built)
- Class & type: C-class light cruiser
- Displacement: 4,320 long tons (4,390 t)
- Length: 446 ft (135.9 m) (o/a)
- Beam: 41 ft 6 in (12.6 m)
- Draught: 14 ft 10 in (4.5 m)
- Installed power: 6 × Yarrow boilers; 40,000 shp (30,000 kW)
- Propulsion: 2 × shafts; 2 × steam turbines
- Speed: 28.5 knots (52.8 km/h; 32.8 mph)
- Complement: 368
- Armament: 3 × single 6 in (152 mm) guns; 6 × single 4 in (102 mm) guns; 1 × single 4 in (102 mm) AA gun; 2 × 21 in (533 mm) torpedo tubes
- Armour: Waterline belt: 1.5–3 in (38–76 mm); Deck: 1 in (25 mm); Conning tower: 6 in

HMS Cambrian was a C-class light cruiser built for the Royal Navy during World War I. She was the name ship of her sub-class of four ships. Assigned to the Grand Fleet upon completion in 1916, the ship played only a small role during the war. Cambrian was assigned to the Atlantic and Mediterranean Fleets during the 1920s and was sent to support British interests in Turkey during the Chanak Crisis of 1922–1923. The ship was placed in reserve in late 1929. She was sold for scrap in 1934.

== Design and description ==
The C-class cruisers were intended to escort the fleet and defend it against enemy destroyers attempting to close within torpedo range. Ordered as part of the 1914–15 Naval Programme, the Cambrian sub-class were a slightly larger and improved version of the preceding Calliope sub-class; Cambrian, the last ship of her sub-class to be completed, differed from her sister ships as she had a more powerful armament. The ships were 446 feet (135.9 m) long overall, with a beam of 41 feet 6 inches (12.6 m) and a mean draught of 14 feet 10 inches (4.5 m). Displacement was 4,320 long tons (4,390 t) at normal and 4,799 long tons (4,876 t) at deep load. Cambrian was powered by four direct-drive Parsons steam turbines, each driving one propeller shaft, which produced a total of 40,000 indicated horsepower (30,000 kW). The turbines used steam generated by six Yarrow boilers which gave her a speed of 28.5 knots (52.8 km/h; 32.8 mph). She carried 841 long tons (854 t) tons of fuel oil. The ship had a crew of 368 officers and ratings.

Cambrian's main armament consisted of three BL 6-inch (152 mm) Mk XII guns that were mounted on the centreline. One gun was forward of the bridge and the last two were in the stern, with one gun superfiring over the rearmost gun. Her secondary armament consisted of six QF 4 in (102 mm) Mk IV guns, three on each side, one pair abaft the bridge on the forecastle deck and the other two pairs one deck lower amidships. For anti-aircraft defence, she was fitted with one QF 4 in (102 mm) Mk V gun. The ship also mounted two submerged 21 in (533 mm) torpedo tubes, one on each broadside. The Cambrians were protected by a waterline belt amidships that ranged in thickness from 1.5–3 inches (38–76 mm) with a 1-inch (25 mm) deck. The walls of their conning tower were 6 inches thick.

=== Wartime modifications ===
During 1917–18, her pole foremast was replaced by a tripod mast that was fitted with a gunnery director. In January 1919, Cambrian had her 4-inch guns removed and an additional 6-inch gun added abaft the funnels. At the same time, her AA gun was replaced by a pair of QF 3 in (76 mm) 20-cwt (Note: "Cwt" is the abbreviation for hundredweight, 20 cwt referring to the weight of the gun.) anti-aircraft guns. Sometime between 1919 and 1924 the ship received a pair of 2-pounder (40 mm) Mk II "pom-pom" guns on single mounts.

== Construction and career ==
Cambrian, the fourth ship of her name in the Royal Navy, was laid down by Pembroke Dockyard in Pembroke Dock, Wales, on 8 December 1914, launched on 3 March 1916, and completed in May 1916. She was commissioned into service that same month and was assigned to the 4th Light Cruiser Squadron of the Grand Fleet in which she served through the end of World War I and until 1919. The squadron was generally tasked with screening the battleships of the Grand Fleet during the war. The ship did not participate in the inconclusive Action of 19 August 1916 with the rest of her squadron. The squadron was briefly detached from the Grand Fleet in March 1917 to fruitlessly patrol off the Norwegian coast when news of a blockade runner was received by the Admiralty.

At the beginning of 1919, Cambrian was refitted in Rosyth before she sailed for Devonport where she was visited by the Edward, Prince of Wales on 13 June. The ship was assigned to the 8th Light Cruiser Squadron on the North America and West Indies Station, based at the Royal Naval Dockyard, on Ireland Island in the Imperial fortress colony of Bermuda the following month, where she served until 1923. Cambrian's crew spent several days in August trying to tow off the schooner Bella Scott after she had run aground near Kingston, Jamaica and received a brief refit in Bermuda in March–April 1920. The Prince of Wales again visited the ship on 26 September in Dominica. On 25 January 1921, she was inspected by Vice-Admiral Sir William Pakenham at Bermuda and again on 17 June. The ship arrived at Plymouth, Massachusetts to participate in the Pilgrim Tercentenary celebrations on 31 July.

She was part of the 2nd Light Cruiser Squadron of the Atlantic Fleet from August 1922 until June 1924, and was detached to support British interests during the Chanak Crisis of 1922–23. She escorted the seaplane carrier Ark Royal from the UK to Turkey from 27 September to 8 October and was later guard ship at Smyrna in December.

The ship was decommissioned in June 1924 and began a refit that lasted into 1926, during which her aft control tower and searchlight platform was removed, when she was recommissioned to serve in the 2nd Light Cruiser Squadron of the Mediterranean Fleet where she participated in a fleet exercise in March 1929. After transporting troops to China in 1929, she was decommissioned in November 1929 and assigned to the Reserve at Nore. She was recommissioned as the flagship of the Nore Reserve in March 1931 and was then decommissioned in July 1933 at Sheerness and listed for sale. Cambrian was sold for scrap on 28 July 1934.

== Bibliography ==
- Campbell, N. J. M. (1986). Jutland: An Analysis of the Fighting. Naval Institute Press. ISBN 0-87021-324-5.
- Colledge, J. J.; Warlow, Ben (2006) [1969]. Ships of the Royal Navy: The Complete Record of All Fighting Ships of the Royal Navy from the 15th Century to the Present (3rd Rev ed.). London: Chatham Publishing. ISBN 978-1-86176-281-8. OCLC 67375475.
- Friedman, Norman (2010). British Cruisers: Two World Wars and After. Seaforth Publishing. ISBN 978-1-59114-078-8.
- Halpern, Paul, ed. (2011). The Mediterranean Fleet 1920–1929. Navy Records Society Publications. Vol. 158. Ashgate. ISBN 978-1-4094-2756-8.
- Newbolt, Henry (1996) [1928]. Naval Operations. History of the Great War Based on Official Documents. Vol. IV. Battery Press. ISBN 0-89839-253-5.
- Preston, Antony (1985). "Great Britain and Empire Forces". In Gray, Randal (ed.). Conway's All the World's Fighting Ships 1906–1921. Naval Institute Press. pp. 1–104. ISBN 0-85177-245-5.
- Raven, Alan & Roberts, John (1980). British Cruisers of World War Two. Naval Institute Press. ISBN 0-87021-922-7.
- "Transcript: HMS CAMBRIAN – January 1919 to April 1922, North America & West Indies Station". Royal Navy Log Books of the World War 1 Era. Naval-History.net.
