= Clem Lewis =

Wales international rugby union player

- Born: John Morris Clement Lewis; 22 June 1890 Bridgend, Wales
- Died: 27 October 1944 (aged 54)

Rugby union career
- Position: Fly half
Amateur team(s)
Years	Team	Apps	(Points)
- Bridgend RFC
1909-1924	Cardiff RFC		
1913-1919	Cambridge University		
1915	Barbarian F.C.		
International career
Years	Team	Apps	(Points)
1912-1923	Wales	11	(19)

Clem Lewis (22 June 1890 – 27 October 1944) was a Welsh international fly-half who played club rugby for Cardiff. Lewis was capped for Wales eleven times either side of World War I, and captained his country on two occasions. Born in Bridgend, Lewis moved to first class team, Cardiff, in 1909 from local club Bridgend. Lewis won two rugby 'blues' for Cambridge and played for invitational team the Barbarians.

== International career ==
Lewis was first capped for Wales against England in the 1912 Five Nations Championship. The previous season, Wales had won the tournament, but Lewis was one of six new caps in the team who fell at the first hurdle, losing 8–0. Although Lewis did not play in the remainder of the tournament he was back the next year scoring a try and a conversion in his second game against Scotland. After serving in World War I, Lewis rejoined Cardiff and was recalled to the Welsh squad in 1921, and in 1923 captained the national team twice.

=== International matches played ===
Wales

- England 1912, 1914, 1923
- France 1913, 1914
- Ireland 1914, 1914, 1921
- Scotland 1913, 1914, 1923

== Bibliography ==
- Smith, David; Williams, Gareth (1980). Fields of Praise: The Official History of The Welsh Rugby Union. Cardiff: University of Wales Press. ISBN 0-7083-0766-3.
