= Thomas Lloyd (rugby union) =

Welsh rugby player (1882–1938)

- Born: Thomas John Lloyd; 1882 Neath, Wales
- Died: 27 April 1938 (aged 55–56) Neath, Wales
- School: Glynneath School
- Occupation(s): collier bookmaker

Rugby union career
- Position: Forward
Amateur team(s)
Years	Team	Apps	(Points)
- Glynneath RFC
–	Neath RFC		
International career
Years	Team	Apps	(Points)
1909-1914	Wales	7	(0)

Thomas John Lloyd (1882 – 27 April 1938) was a Welsh international, rugby union forward who played club rugby for Neath. He won seven international caps for Wales from 1909 to 1914; his last as part of the 'Terrible Eight', the Wales pack that played Ireland in a violent match before the First World War ended international competition.

== International matches played ==
Wales

- England 1914
- France 1909, 1913, 1914
- Ireland 1913, 1914
- Scotland 1909, 1910

== Bibliography ==
- Smith, David; Williams, Gareth (1980). Fields of Praise: The Official History of The Welsh Rugby Union. Cardiff: University of Wales Press. ISBN 0-7083-0766-3.
