= Teddy Haselmere =

English rugby union player

- Born: Edward Ernest Hasselmeier; 1 April 1895 Rugby, Warwickshire, England
- Died: 8 October 1983 (aged 88) Rugby, Warwickshire
- Occupation: Engineer

Rugby union career
- Position: Wing
Senior career
Years	Team	Apps	(Points)
1913	Rugby		
1918–23	Leicester Tigers	180	(528)
1923–?	Rugby	106	
–	Northampton Saints	162	

Teddy Haselmere (born Edward Ernest Hasselmeier, 1 April 1895 – 8 October 1983) was a rugby union wing who played for Leicester Tigers, Northampton Saints and Rugby Lions. He holds a number of records for Leicester Tigers including most appearances in a season (45 in 1922–23), most tries in a season (59 in 1919–20), most tries in a calendar year (46 in 1920) and most time scores a hat-trick or better (17). He scored 136 tries in 180 appearances for Leicester, 6th most of all-time.

Haselmere first played for his home-town of Rugby under his birth-name of Hasselmeier in 1913 but the family changed their name due to anti-German feeling arising from the First World War. He made his debut for Leicester on 26 December 1918 in the club's first post-war game. The next season he set the record for tries in a single season with 59 tries in 40 appearances. He gained an England trial in the season but was not capped. In 1922–23 he was an ever-present for the Tigers playing all 45 matches in the season but left the club the following season. He also played for Rugby and Northampton Saints amassing 310 tries in 448 games.

In 2008 he was nominated for a place on Leicester's Walk of Legends but was beaten by Rory Underwood.

== Sources ==
- Farmer, Stuart; Hands, David (2014). Tigers - Official history of Leicester Football Club. The Rugby Development Foundation. ISBN 978-0-9930213-0-5.
