= Arthur Gilbert Bull =

English rugby union player

- Born: Arthur Gilbert Bull; 1890 Olney, Buckinghamshire
- Died: 15 March 1963 (aged 72–73) Chandler's Ford, Hampshire
- School: Bedford Modern School

Rugby union career
- Position: Flanker
Senior career
Years	Team	Apps	(Points)
1902-1924	Northampton Saints	113	
1918–1919	Leicester Tigers	17	(8)
International career
Years	Team	Apps	(Points)
1910–1914	England	24	(20)

Arthur Gilbert Bull MRCS LRCP (1890–15 March 1963), also known as A.G. Bull, was an England rugby international and Captain of Northampton Saints in 1924.

== Life ==
Arthur Gilbert Bull was born in Olney, Buckinghamshire in 1890. He was baptised on 13 July 1890 at Hardingstone in the County of Northamptonshire, the son of Arthur Bull of Leicestershire and Annie Bull of Inverness-shire. He was educated at Bedford Modern School.

Bull's only game for England was against Wales at Twickenham on 17 January 1914. Bull played for Leicester Tigers in the 1918–1919 season following the end of the First World War. He later played club rugby for Northampton Saints and was captain of the team in 1924. After ending his career as a rugby player he became the manager of Northampton Saints.

Bull trained as a doctor and was a Member of the Royal College of Surgeons and the Royal College of Physicians. He died in Chandler's Ford, Hampshire on 15 March 1963.
