= Louis Ford (footballer) =

Welsh footballer

Personal information
- Full name: Louis John Copp Ford
- Date of birth: 18 May 1914
- Place of birth: Cardiff, Wales
- Date of death: 20 September 1980 (aged 66)
- Position: Defender

Senior career*
Years	Team	Apps	(Gls)
1936–1939	Cardiff City	35	(0)
- * Club domestic league appearances and goals

Louis John Copp Ford (18 May 1914 – 20 September 1980) was a Welsh professional footballer. He made 41 appearances for Cardiff City in all competitions before his career was ended following the outbreak of World War II.
