= Thomas Thomas (harpist) =

Thomas Thomas known by his Welsh surname Aptommas (1829-1913) was a Welsh harpist and composer-arranger.

He was born in Bridgend, a younger brother of the more famous John Thomas (Pencerdd Gwalia). He performed in America with Louis Moreau Gottschalk and Henriette Behrend. Even when playing the pedal harp, Thomas kept the instrument on his left shoulder, as did traditional Welsh harpists. Harp-maker Erard had to construct special harps with the mechanisms reversed for him.
