= Edgar Morgan (rugby union, born 1882) =

GB & Wales international rugby union player

- Born: Edgar Morgan Pontardawe, Wales
- School: Collegiate School, Alltwen
- University: University College of North Wales, Bangor

Rugby union career
- Position: Forward
Amateur team(s)
Years	Team	Apps	(Points)
- Alltwen RFC
–	Pontardawe RFC		
–	Swansea RFC		
International career
Years	Team	Apps	(Points)
1914	Wales	4	(0)
1908	British Isles	2	(0)

Edgar Morgan (15 April 1882– April 1962) was a Welsh international rugby union forward who played club rugby for Swansea Rugby Football Club and the British Lions

Morgan made his Swansea debut in 1907 and played in the Swansea victories over both touring Australian (1908) and South African (1912) teams. He joined the British Army during World War I, and was later commissioned as an infantry officer before transferring to the Royal Engineers.

== International career ==
Morgan gained his first international cap, when he was called up to play for Arthur Harding's Anglo-Welsh, British Lions team that toured New Zealand and Australia in 1908. It took a further six years until Morgan won his first Welsh cap against England at Twickenham on 17 January 1914. Morgan played all four home nation games that season and may have gained more caps but for the outbreak of the World War.

International matches played

- England 1914
- France 1914
- Ireland 1914
- Scotland 1914

== Bibliography ==
- Parry-Jones, David (1999). Prince Gwyn, Gwyn Nicholls and the First Golden Era of Welsh Rugby. Bridgend: seren. ISBN 1-85411-262-7.
- Smith, David; Williams, Gareth (1980). Fields of Praise: The Official History of The Welsh Rugby Union. Cardiff: University of Wales Press. ISBN 0-7083-0766-3.
