= Jenkin Alban Davies =

Wales international rugby union player (1885–1976)

- Born: Jenkin Alban Davies; 5 September 1885 Aberaeron, Wales
- Died: 18 July 1976 (aged 90) Los Angeles, United States
- School: St John's School, Leatherhead; Llandovery College
- University: Jesus College, Oxford
- Occupation(s): Vicar schoolmaster

Rugby union career
- Position: Forward
Amateur team(s)
Years	Team	Apps	(Points)
- Oxford University RFC
1909/10	Cardiff RFC		
1910–1913	Swansea RFC		
1913–1914	Llanelli RFC		
- London Welsh RFC
–	Glamorgan County RFC		
International career
Years	Team	Apps	(Points)
1913–1914	Wales	7	(6)

Jenkin Alban Davies (5 September 1885 – 18 July 1976) was a Welsh international rugby union player.

== Life ==
Davies was born in Aberaeron, Wales. He was educated at Jesus College, Oxford, but did not win a "Blue". He first played for Swansea RFC in 1910. Davies played for the Wales national rugby union team on seven occasions in the Five Nations Championship. He made his debut on 1 February 1913 against Scotland and later that month played against France scoring his first international try. In the following year, he played in all four matches (against England, Scotland, France and Ireland), scoring a try in the match against France. He captained the "Terrible Eight" against Ireland in 1914, but was playing for Llanelli RFC by this time.

During the First World War, Davies served as a chaplain with the Royal Field Artillery. He was appointed vicar of Hook in 1924, succeeding another Welsh rugby international, William Havard. Davies was also a schoolmaster. He died on 18 July 1976 in Los Angeles.

International matches played

- England 1914
- France 1913, 1914
- Ireland 1913, 1914
- Scotland 1913, 1914
