= Bruno Brown =

English rugby union player and surgeon

- Born: Leonard Graham Brown; 6 September 1888 Brisbane, Australia
- Died: 23 May 1950 (aged 61) Charing Cross

Rugby union career
- Position: Prop
International career
Years	Team	Apps	(Points)
1911–1922	England	18	(Pts:12; Tries:4; Conv:0; Pens:0; Drop:0)

Dr. Leonard Graham Brown MC (6 September 1888 – 23 May 1950) was an ear, nose and throat Surgeon, politician and rugby union international who represented England from 1911 to 1922. He also captained his country.

== Early life ==
Bruno Brown was born on 6 September 1888 in Brisbane.

== Rugby union career ==
Brown made his international debut on 21 January 1911 at St Helen's, Swansea in the Wales vs England match. Of the 18 matches he played for his national side, he was on the winning side on 14 occasions. He played his final match for England on 21 January 1922 at Cardiff Arms Park in the Wales vs England match.

== World War I ==
He became a lieutenant-colonel in the Royal Army Medical Corps in World War I and was awarded an MC in 1917.
