= William Mervyn Stanley Trick =

Welsh cricketer and footballer

William Mervyn Stanley Trick (31 October 1916 – 27 October 1995 (aged 78)) was a Welsh cricketer who made 19 appearances for Glamorgan between 1946 and 1950. A bowler who could bowl slow left-arm spin and left-arm medium pace, he enjoyed a "prolific record" before and after the Second World War in the South Wales Cricket Association which brought him his place in Glamorgan, and also played occasionally for the school-boy level Wales national football team. He played fewer matches than his abilities - 56 wickets at 19.41 - warranted, due to his dedication to a family motoring business in Neath.

He continued to play club cricket with Neath Cricket Club until well into his seventies
