= Sid Smart =

England international rugby union player

- Full name: Sydney Edward John Smart
- Born: 20 February 1888 Gloucester, England
- Died: 25 January 1969 (aged 80) Gloucester, England

Rugby union career
- Position: No. 8
Senior career
| Years | Team | Apps | (Points) |
| 1911-1926 | Gloucester RFC | 196 | (39) |
International career
| Years | Team | Apps | (Points) |
| 1913–20 | England | 12 | (0) |

Sydney Edward John Smart (20 February 1888 – 25 January 1969) was an English international rugby union player.

The son of a labourer, Smart was born and raised in Gloucester, where he attended Deacon's School.

Smart played his rugby primarily as a number eight and had a quick rise to representative rugby, following his Gloucester RFC debut in 1911. He appeared for Gloucestershire during his first season and in 1913 gained the first of his 12 England caps when he played against the Springboks at Twickenham. A member of England's 1913 and 1914 Five Nations grand slam-winning sides, Smart's career was then put on hold due to his wartime service.

An officer in the Gloucestershire Regiment, Smart saw active service in France and was twice wounded.

Smart returned to rugby briefly after the war, gaining a further three England caps in 1920. He captained Gloucester in 1921-22 and after one more season largely retired from the sport, making only sporadic club appearances thereafter.

== See also ==
- List of England national rugby union players
