= Tim Taylor (rugby union, born 1888) =

England international rugby union player

- Born: Frederick Mark Taylor; 18 March 1888 Leicester, England
- Died: 2 March 1966 (aged 77) Leicester, England
- Occupation: Solicitor's Managing Clerk

Rugby union career
- Position: Fly Half
Senior career
Years	Team	Apps	(Points)
1907–1923	Leicester Tigers	294	(295)
International career
Years	Team	Apps	(Points)
1914	England	1	(0)

Frederick Mark Taylor known as Tim Taylor (18 March 1888 – 2 March 1966) was a rugby union fly half who played 294 games for Leicester Tigers between 1907–1923 and once for England in 1914.

Taylor made his Leicester debut on 5 October 1907 at Welford Road against Manchester in a 32–6 win for Leicester, he also played the next match against Bristol but did not feature again in the 1907/08 season. For the next two season's Tim was the back up to Tigers captain Jamie Watson before forcing Watson to centre in the second half of the 1909/10 season. Taylor started the Midlands Counties Cup final in 1910 against Coventry which Leicester won, he also played as Leicester won the cup in 1912 and 1913.

Tim Taylor formed a long lasting half back partnership with Pedlar Wood playing 188 games together for Leicester, this is the third most selected half back partnership in the club's history.

Taylor played his only international for England on 17 January 1914 against Wales at Twickenham. He played with his regular Leicester partner Wood and despite winning the game both players were dropped for the next game in the 1914 Five Nations Championship against Scotland.

== Sources ==
Farmer, Stuart & Hands, David Tigers-Official History of Leicester Football Club (The Rugby DevelopmentFoundation ISBN 978-0-9930213-0-5)
