= Reg Pickles =

England international rugby union player

- Full name: Reginald Clarence Werrett Pickles
- Born: 11 December 1895 Bristol, England
- Died: 6 November 1978 (aged 82) Weston-super-Mare, England

Rugby union career
- Position: Fullback / Centre
International career
Years	Team	Apps	(Points)
1922	England	2	(0)

Reginald Clarence Werrett Pickles (11 December 1895 – 6 November 1978) was an English international rugby union player active in the 1910s and 1920s.

Born in Bristol, Pickles served as an officer in the Royal Engineers during World War I and gained his first international representative honours as a member of the "Mother County" team which played against the New Zealand Army at the 1918-19 Inter Services King's Cup tournament.

Pickles, primarily a fullback, was a fast player with a good kicking game. He could also play centre, a position he was used in more towards the end of his career, in matches for his club Bristol and Gloucestershire. In 1922, Pickles was fullback for England in two Five Nations matches, against Ireland at Lansdowne Road and France at Twickenham. He had two seasons as captain of Bristol, including the club's first at Memorial Stadium.

== See also ==
- List of England national rugby union players
