= Harry Uzzell =

Wales international rugby union player

- Born: Henry Uzzell; 6 January 1883 Shirehampton, England
- Died: 20 December 1960 (aged 77) Bassaleg, Wales
- School: Crindau School
- Occupation(s): Greengrocer publican

Rugby union career
- Position: hooker
Amateur team(s)
Years	Team	Apps	(Points)
- London Welsh RFC
- Tredegar RFC
1902-1921	Newport RFC		
–	Gloucestershire		
International career
Years	Team	Apps	(Points)
1912-1920	Wales	15	(6)

Henry "Harry" Uzzell (6 January 1883 – 20 December 1960) was a Welsh international rugby union player. He played club rugby predominantly for Newport and played county rugby for Gloucestershire. A fruiterer by trade he later became landlord of the Tredegar Arms in Bassaleg.

Uzzell spent the majority of his rugby career with Newport and captained them during the 1913/14 season. In 1912 he was part of the Swansea team that beat the touring South Africans.

== International career ==
Uzzell made his debut for Wales on 20 January 1912 against England. He would represent his country on 15 occasions in total, captaining his country four times. In one game against France at St Helen's, Swansea, Uzzell scored two tries the only points he collected for his country. It is probably true that Uzzell would have been capped far more but for the intervention of the First World War.

=== International games played ===
Wales

- England 1912, 1914, 1920
- Ireland 1912, 1913, 1914, 1920
- France 1912, 1913, 1914, 1920
- Scotland 1912, 1913, 1914, 1920

== Bibliography ==
- Parry-Jones, David (1999). Prince Gwyn, Gwyn Nicholls and the First Golden Era of Welsh Rugby. Bridgend: seren. ISBN 1-85411-262-7.
- Smith, David; Williams, Gareth (1980). Fields of Praise: The Official History of The Welsh Rugby Union. Cardiff: University of Wales Press. ISBN 0-7083-0766-3.

Rugby Union Captain
Preceded by Walter Martin	Newport RFC captain 1913-1914	Succeeded by World War I
