= 1913 Five Nations Championship =

Rugby union competition

- Date: 1 January - 24 March 1913
- Countries: England; France; Ireland; Scotland; Wales

Tournament statistics
- Champions: England (5th title)
- Grand Slam: England (1st title)
- Triple Crown: England (4th title)
- Matches played: 10

The 1913 Five Nations Championship was the fourth series of the rugby union Five Nations Championship following the inclusion of France into the Home Nations Championship. Including the previous Home Nations Championships, this was the thirty-first series of the annual northern hemisphere rugby union championship. Ten matches were played between 1 January and 24 March. It was contested by England, France, Ireland, Scotland and Wales.

England won the Grand Slam for the first time, and the Triple Crown for the fourth time. They conceded only one score during the tournament, a dropped goal scored by Ireland, and as of 2020 this remains a record for a Grand Slam-winning team.

== Table ==
Pos	Team	Pld	W	D	L	PF	PA	PD	Pts
1	England	4	4	0	0	50	4	+46	8
2	Wales	4	3	0	1	35	33	+2	6
3	Scotland	4	2	0	2	50	28	+22	4
4	Ireland	4	1	0	3	55	60	−5	2
5	France	4	0	0	4	11	76	−65	0

== Results ==
1913-01-01

France	3–21	Scotland

Paris

1913-01-18

Wales	0–12	England

Cardiff

1913-01-25

England	20–0	France

London

1913-02-01

Scotland	0–8	Wales

Edinburgh

1913-02-08

Ireland	4–15	England

Dublin

1913-02-22

Scotland	29–14	Ireland

Edinburgh

1913-02-27

France	8–11	Wales

Paris

1913-03-08

Wales	16–13	Ireland

Swansea

1913-03-15

England	3–0	Scotland

London

1913-03-24

Ireland	24–0	France

Cork
