= Pedlar Wood =

England international rugby union player

- Born: George William Wood; 5 February 1886 Leicester, England
- Died: 12 June 1969 (aged 83) Leicester, England
- Occupation: Inspector for British United Shoe Machinery Company

Rugby union career
- Position: Scrum half
Senior career
Years	Team	Apps	(Points)
1906–1922	Leicester Tigers	388	(336)
1922–1927	Nuneaton	170	(132)
1906–1927	Total	558	(468)
International career
Years	Team	Apps	(Points)
1914	England	1	(0)

George William Wood known as Pedlar Wood (5 February 1886 – 12 June 1969) was a rugby union scrum half who played 388 games for Leicester Tigers between 1906 and 1922, the 8th most of any player, and once for England in 1914.

== Career ==
Wood made his Leicester debut on 10 November 1906 at Welford Road against Newport in a 3–3 draw. Wood was a regular in the team and missed just 24 games as he became the 5th player to make 300 appearances for Leicester, in terms of club matches this is the fewest any player has taken to reach 300 individual appearances. However, as the First World War intervened in his career it was not the quickest.

Wood played in four victorious Midlands Counties Cup finals for Leicester between 1909 and 1913. Leicester left the Midlands Counties after the First World War but on joining Nuneaton in 1922 Wood won the competition a further two times. Wood played 170 games for Nuneaton over 5 seasons and retired aged 40 in 1927.

Wood formed a long lasting half back partnership with Tim Taylor playing 188 games together for Leicester, this is the third most selected half back partnership in the club's history.

Wood played his only international for England on 17 January 1914 against Wales at Twickenham. Wood played with his regular Leicester partner Taylor and despite winning the game both players were dropped for the next game in the 1914 Five Nations Championship against Scotland.

== Sources ==
Farmer, Stuart & Hands, David Tigers-Official History of Leicester Football Club (The Rugby DevelopmentFoundation ISBN 978-0-9930213-0-5)
