= 1912 Five Nations Championship =

Rugby union competition

- Date: 1 January - 8 April 1912
- Countries: England; France; Ireland; Scotland; Wales

Tournament statistics
- Champions: England and Ireland
- Matches played: 10
- Top point scorer: (Ireland) Lloyd (18)

The 1912 Five Nations Championship was the third series of the rugby union Five Nations Championship following the inclusion of France into the Home Nations Championship. Including the previous Home Nations Championships, this was the thirtieth series of the annual northern hemisphere rugby union championship. Ten matches were played between 1 January and 8 April. It was contested by England, France, Ireland, Scotland and Wales.

== Table ==
Pos	Team	Pld	W	D	L	PF	PA	PD	Pts
1	England	4	3	0	1	44	16	+28	6
1	Ireland	4	3	0	1	33	34	−1	6
3	Scotland	4	2	0	2	53	37	+16	4
3	Wales	4	2	0	2	40	34	+6	4
5	France	4	0	0	4	25	74	−49	0

== Results ==
1 January 1912

France	6–11	Ireland

Paris

20 January 1912

Scotland	31–3	France

Edinburgh

20 January 1912

England	8–0	Wales

London

3 February 1912

Wales	21–6	Scotland

Swansea

10 February 1912

England	15–0	Ireland

London

24 February 1912

Ireland	10–8	Scotland

Dublin

9 March 1912

Ireland	12–5	Wales

Belfast

16 March 1912

Scotland	8–3	England

Edinburgh

25 March 1912

Wales	14–8	France

Newport

8 April 1912

France	8–18	England

Paris
