= 1980 South Africa rugby union tour of South America =

Summary
P	W	D	L
Total
5	5	0	0
Test match
2	2	0	0
Opponent
P	W	D	L
South America
2	2	0	0

The 1980 South Africa rugby union tour of South America was a series of six matches played by the South Africa national rugby union team (the Springboks) in Paraguay, Uruguay and Chile in October 1980. The South Africa team won all six of their matches including both test matches against the South American Jaguars.

The tour was a reciprocal visit for the South American Jaguars tour to South Africa earlier in 1980 and the two test matches were originally scheduled to be played in Argentina. The Argentine government subsequently banned the South Africans from visiting Argentina in protest at the South African government's apartheid policies and the internationals were re-arranged for Uruguay and Chile. The South American side was composed entirely of Argentine players.

South Africa's touring party included Errol Tobias, the first non-white player to represent the Springboks.

== Matches ==
9 October 1980

Paraguay	6–84	South Africa XV

Asunción

11 October 1980

Invitation XV	18–79	South Africa XV

Asunción

14 October 1980

British School	13–83	South Africa XV

Estadio Viera, Montevideo

18 October 1980

South American Jaguars	13–22	South Africa
Try: Cubelli, Madero; Con: Porta; Drop: Landajo		Try: Burger, Gerber; Stofberg; Con: Botha 2 Pen: Botha; Drop: Botha

Estadio Viera, Montevideo
Referee: Laurie M. Prideaux (ENG)

South American Jaguars			South Africa
Daniel Baetti	FB	15	FB	Gysie Pienaar
Adolfo Cappelletti	W	14	W	Ray Mordt
Marcelo Loffreda	C	13	C	Danie Gerber
Rafael Madero	C	12	C	Willie du Plessis
Marcelo Campo	W	11	W	Gerrie Germishuys
(capt.) Hugo Porta	FH	10	FH	Naas Botha
Tomas Landajo	SH	9	SH	Divan Serfontein
Carlos Serrano	N8	8	N8	Thys Burger
Gabriel Travaglini	F	7	F	Theuns Stofberg (capt.)
Tomas Petersen	F	6	F	Rob Louw
Ernesto Ure	L	5	L	Louis Moolman
Alejandro Iachetti	L	4	L	Moaner van Heerden
Topo Rodriguez	P	3	P	Martiens le Roux
Alejandro Cubelli	H	2	H	Willie Kahts
Fernando Morel	P	1	P	Richard Prentis
		Replacements
Jose Crivelli	H	16		Hempies du Toit
Jorge Zerbino		17		Robert Cockrell
Eduardo Cerruti		18		Eben Jansen
Rodolfo Ventura		19		Tommy du Plessis
Javier Escalante		20		De Wet Ras
R. Luque		21		Tim Cocks

25 October 1980

South American Jaguars	16–30	South Africa
Try: Campo, Iachetti; Con: Porta; Pen: Porta; Drop: Porta		Try: Burger, Gerber; Stofberg; Con: Botha 3 Pen: Botha; Drop: Botha

Prince of Wales, Santiago
Referee: Laurie M. Prideaux (ENG)

South American Jaguars			South Africa
Daniel Baetti	FB	15	FB	Gysie Pienaar
Adolfo Cappelletti	W	14	W	Ray Mordt
Juan Pablo Piccardo	C	13	C	Danie Gerber
Guillermo Varone	C	12	C	Willie du Plessis
Marcelo Campo	W	11	W	Gerrie Germishuys
(capt.) Hugo Porta	FH	10	FH	Naas Botha
Tomas Landajo	SH	9	SH	Divan Serfontein
Carlos Serrano	N8	8	N8	Morne du Plessis (capt.)
Gabriel Travaglini	F	7	F	Theuns Stofberg
Jorge Allen	F	6	F	Rob Louw
Ernesto Ure	L	5	L	Louis Moolman
Alejandro Iachetti	L	4	L	Moaner van Heerden
Topo Rodriguez	P	3	P	Martiens le Roux
Alejandro Cubelli	H	2	H	Willie Kahts
Fernando Morel	P	1	P	Richard Prentis

== Touring party ==
- Manager: J. Pretorius
- Assistant Manager: Nelie Smith
- Captain: Morné du Plessis

=== Backs ===
- Gysie Pienaar
- Tim Cocks
- Gerrie Germishuys
- Edrich Krantz
- Ray Mordt
- Willie du Plessis
- Danie Gerber
- De Wet Ras
- Naas Botha
- Errol Tobias
- Divan Serfontein
- Tommy du Plessis

=== Forwards ===
- Morné du Plessis
- Thys Burger
- Theuns Stofberg
- Eben Jansen
- Rob Louw
- Div Visser
- Moaner van Heerden
- Louis Moolman
- Martiens le Roux
- Richard Prentis
- Hempies du Toit
- Willie Kahts
- Robert Cockrell
