= 1982 South American Jaguars rugby union tour of South Africa =

- Date: Mar–Abr 1982
- Tour captain: Hugo Porta
Summary
P	W	D	L
Total
7	6	0	1
Test match
2	1	0	1
Opponent
P	W	D	L
South Africa
2	1	0	1

The 1982 Sudamérica XV rugby union tour of South Africa was a series of seven matches played by the Sudamérica XV rugby union team in South Africa in March and April 1982. The South American team won six of their tour matches, suffering only a single defeat to the South Africa national side. The South American team's 21–12 victory over South Africa in the second international was a major shock and described by Rothmans Rugby Yearbook as "a phenomenon of international rugby".

The touring team comprised 42 players, including some from the Chile national rugby union team, Uruguay national rugby union team and Paraguay national rugby union team but the players who took part in the two international fixtures were drawn entirely from the Argentina national rugby union team and were described as "effectively the Pumas".

== Matches ==
=== Summary ===
Test matches

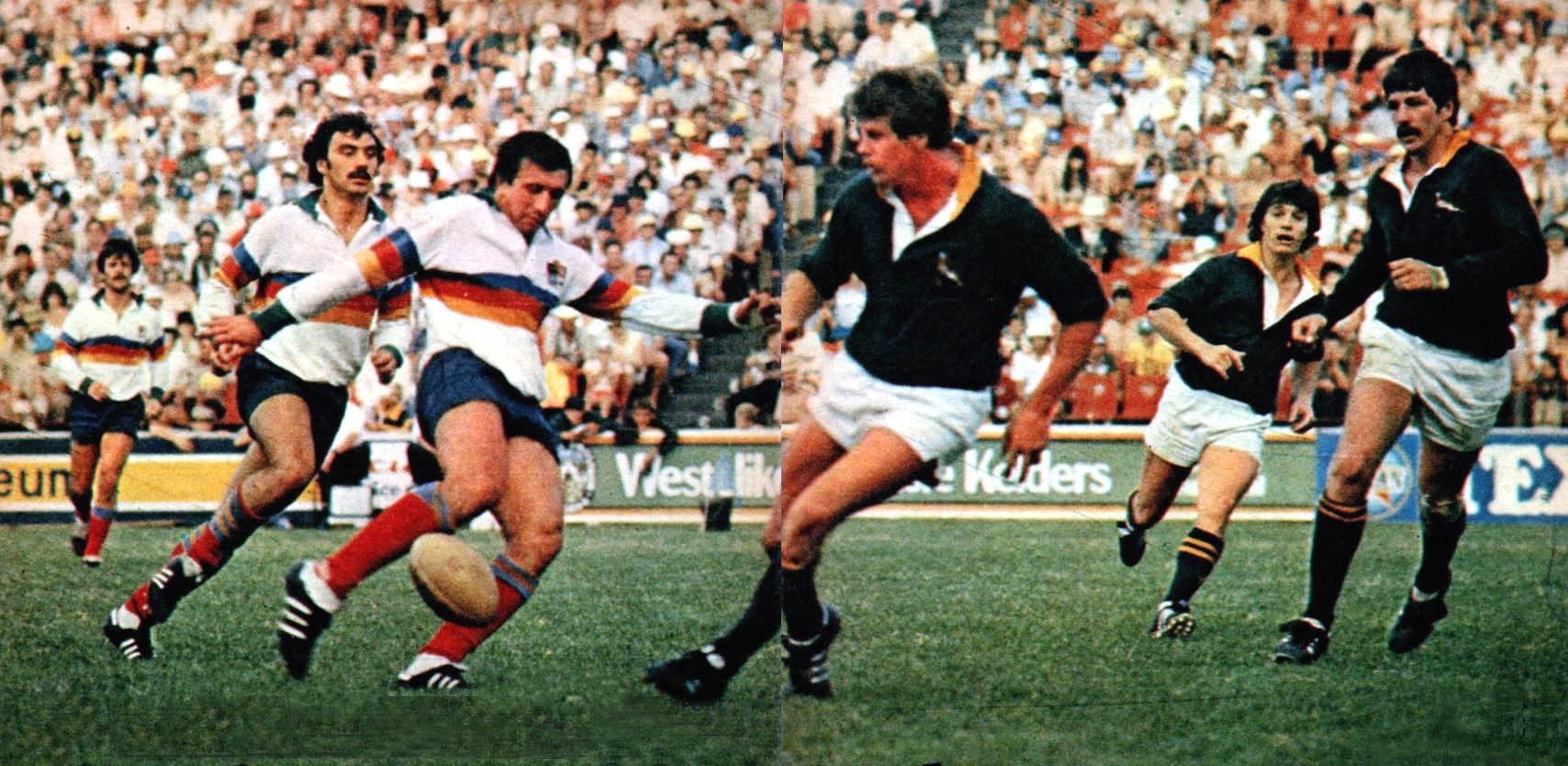
A moment of the 2nd test at Free State Stadium

#	Date	Rival	Score	Venue	City
1	13 Mar	Griqualand West	44–3	n/a	Kimberley
2	17 Mar	North Eastern Cape	72–3	n/a	Cradock
3	20 Mar	Natal	16–10	n/a	Durban
4	23 Mar	Western Transvaal	30–18	n/a	Potchefstroom
5	27 Mar	South Africa	18–50	Loftus Versfeld Stadium	Johannesburg
6	30 Mar	Northern Free State	18–12	n/a	Durban
7	3 Apr	South Africa	21–12	Free State Stadium	Bloemfontein

Statistics
Pl	W	D	L	PS	PC
7	6	0	1	219	108

=== Details ===
13 March 1982

Griqualand West	3–44	Sudamérica XV

Kimberley

17 March 1982

North Eastern Cape	3–72	Sudamérica XV

Cradock

20 March 1982

Natal	10–16	Sudamérica XV

Durban

23 March 1982

Western Transvaal	18–30	Sudamérica XV

Potchefstroom

27 March 1982

South Africa	50–18	Sudamérica XV
Try: CJ du Plessis, W du Plessis; Gerber 3, Mordt 2 Oosthuizen; Con: Botha 6 Pen: Heunis; Drop: Botha		Try: Puccio; Con: Porta; Pen: Porta 4

Loftus Versfeld, Pretoria
Attendance: 28.000
Referee: Steve Strydom (SARB)

Team details

South Africa	Sudamérica XV

South Africa			Sudamérica XV
Johan Heunis	FB	15	FB	Guillermo Varone
Ray Mordt	W	14	W	Jose Palma
Danie Gerber	C	13	C	Marcelo Loffreda
Willie du Plessis	C	12	C	Rafael Madero
Carel du Plessis	W	11	W	Alejandro Puccio
Naas Botha	FH	10	FH	Hugo Porta (capt.)
Divan Serfontein	SH	9	SH	Alfredo Soares Gache
(capt.) Wynand Claassen	N8	8	N8	Miguel Tezanos Pinto
Burger Geldenhuys	F	7	F	Ernesto Ure
Rob Louw	F	6	F	Jorge Allen
Louis Moolman	L	5	L	Carlos Bottarini
Theuns Stofberg	L	4	L	Miguel Glastra
Hempies du Toit	P	3	P	Carlos Sainz Trapaga
Willie Kahts	H	2	H	Andrés Courreges
Ockie Oosthuizen	P	1	P	Pablo Devoto

30 March 1982

Northern Free State	12–18	Sudamérica XV

Durban

3 April 1982

South Africa	12–21	Sudamérica XV
Try: Gerber; Con: Botha; Pen: Botha 2		Try: Porta; Con: Porta; Pen: Porta 4 Drop: Porta

Free State Stadium, Bloemfontein
Attendance: 21.000
Referee: Steve Strydom (SARB)

Team details

South Africa	Sudamérica XV

South Africa			Sudamérica XV
Johan Heunis	FB	15	FB	Eduardo Sanguinetti
Ray Mordt	W	14	W	Guillermo Varone
Danie Gerber	C	13	C	Marcelo Loffreda
Willie du Plessis	C	12	C	Rafael Madero
Carel du Plessis	W	11	W	Alejandro Puccio
Naas Botha	FH	10	FH	Hugo Porta (capt.)
Divan Serfontein	SH	9	SH	Alfredo Soares Gache
(capt.) Wynand Claassen	N8	8	N8	Ernesto Ure
Burger Geldenhuys	F	7	F	Mario Negri
Rob Louw	F	6	F	Jorge Allen
Louis Moolman	L	5	L	Carlos Bottarini
Theuns Stofberg	L	4	L	Eliseo Branca
Hempies du Toit	P	3	P	Serafín Dengra
Willie Kahts	H	2	H	Andrés Courreges
Ockie Oosthuizen	P	1	P	Pablo Devoto
		Replacements
(substituted on) Henning van Aswegen	P

== Touring party ==
- Manager: O. C. Martinez-Bassante
- Assistant managers: W. G. Davies, R. F. O'Reilly
- Captain: Hugo Porta

== Bibliography ==
- Vivian Jenkins, ed. (1982). Rothmans Rugby Yearbook 1982-83. Rothmans Publications Ltd. pp. 68–69. ISBN 0907574130.
