= 1980 British Lions tour to South Africa =

- Date: 10 May – 12 July
- Coach: (Ireland) Noel Murphy
- Tour captain: (England) Bill Beaumont
- Test series winners: South Africa (1–3)
- Top test point scorer: (Ireland) Tony Ward (18)
Summary
P	W	D	L
Total
18	15	0	3
Test match
4	1	0	3
Opponent
P	W	D	L
South Africa
4	1	0	3

Tour chronology
- ← New Zealand 1977 New Zealand 1983 →

In 1980 the British Lions rugby union team toured South Africa (including one game in Windhoek, South West Africa, the future Namibia). The tour was not a success for the Lions, as they lost the first three tests before salvaging some pride with a win in the fourth. The team did however win all their 14 non-international matches. The Lions were captained by Bill Beaumont.

== Political controversy ==
The tour went ahead in the face of opposition from the British Government and groups opposed to sporting contact with the apartheid regime in South Africa. Britain was a signatory to the 1977 Gleneagles Agreement in which Commonwealth governments agreed to discourage sporting contacts with South Africa. The Government of the Republic of Ireland were also against the tour. The Four Home Unions committee which organises Lions tours decided to go ahead with the planned tour, despite this opposition, in November 1979 and the rugby unions of England (RFU), Ireland (IRFU), Scotland (SRU) and Wales (WRU) all approved the tour by January 1980.

== Touring party, injuries and replacements ==
Of the 30 players originally selected, ten had previous Lions tour experience. Derek Quinnell had toured New Zealand in 1971 and 1977; Andy Irvine and Fran Cotton had toured South Africa in 1974 and New Zealand in 1977 while Bruce Hay, Bill Beaumont, Allan Martin, Graham Price, Jeff Squire, Peter Wheeler and Clive Williams had all toured New Zealand in 1977. Elgan Rees, added to the party before it left the UK, and Phil Orr, a replacement during the tour, had also toured in 1977. Quinnell was selected despite not playing in the 1980 Five Nations Championship; he had also toured in 1971 when yet to be capped by Wales.

The tour party was disrupted by an unusually high number of injuries and replacements throughout the 10-week-long tour. Eight players flew to South Africa to reinforce the original 30 tourists; Gareth Williams, Tony Ward, Ian Stephens, John Robbie, Phil Orr, Andy Irvine, Paul Dodge and Steve Smith.

Smith joined the tour as cover prior to the final test after Patterson was injured and did not appear in any games. Irvine was in the original 30 selected tourists but withdrew due to injury prior to leaving the UK. He was replaced by Elgan Rees but joined the tour later when Slemen withdrew.

Nine players left the tour early, including Mike Slemen who went home due to family illness. The eight players who were ruled out by injury were Rodney O'Donnell (neck), David Richards (shoulder), Gareth Davies (shoulder and knee), Terry Holmes (shoulder and knee), Stuart Lane (knee), Phil Blakeway (rib) and Fran Cotton (suspected heart trouble). Lane's injury occurred after 55 seconds of the opening game and gave him the shortest career of any Lions tourist. He never played international rugby again. O'Donnell's neck injury ended his rugby career completely. Colin Patterson suffered a knee injury in the penultimate game against Griqualand West which also proved career-ending.

== Squad ==
=== Management ===
- Manager Syd Millar (Ireland)
- Coach Noel Murphy (Ireland)
- Team Doctor Jack Matthews (Wales)

=== Backs ===
Fullbacks

- Rodney O'Donnell (St. Mary's College and Ireland)
- Bruce Hay (Boroughmuir and Scotland)
- Andy Irvine (Heriots FP and Scotland) as replacement

Wings

- Mike Slemen (Liverpool and England)
- John Carleton (Orrell and England)
- Elgan Rees (Neath and Wales)
- Peter Morgan (Llanelli and Wales)

Centres

- Jim Renwick (Hawick and Scotland)
- Ray Gravell (Llanelli and Wales)
- David Richards (Swansea and Wales)
- Clive Woodward (Leicester and England)
- Paul Dodge (Leicester and England) as replacement

Fly-halves

- Gareth Davies (Cardiff and Wales)
- Ollie Campbell (Old Belvedere and Ireland)
- Tony Ward (Garryowen and Ireland) as replacement

Scrum-halves

- Terry Holmes (Cardiff and Wales)
- Colin Patterson (Instonians and Ireland)
- John Robbie (Greystones RFC and Ireland) as replacement
- Steve Smith (Sale and England) as replacement

=== Forwards ===
Hookers

- Peter Wheeler (Leicester and England)
- Alan Phillips (Cardiff and Wales)

Props

- Fran Cotton (Sale and England)
- Clive Williams (Swansea and Wales)
- Ian Stephens (Bridgend and Wales) as replacement
- Phil Orr (Old Wesley and Ireland) as replacement
- Graham Price (Pontypool and Wales)
- Phil Blakeway (Gloucester and England)

Locks

- Bill Beaumont (captain; Fylde and England)
- Maurice Colclough (Angoulême and England)
- Alan Tomes (Hawick and Scotland)
- Allan Martin (Aberavon and Wales)

Back row

- John O'Driscoll (London Irish and Ireland)
- Colm Tucker (Shannon and Ireland)
- Jeff Squire (Pontypool and Wales)
- Stuart Lane (Cardiff and Wales)
- Derek Quinnell (Llanelli and Wales)
- John Beattie (Glasgow Academicals and Scotland)
- Gareth Williams (Bridgend and Wales) as replacement

== Schedule ==
Match	Date	Opponent	Location	Result	Score
Match 1	10 May	Eastern Province	Boet Erasmus Stadium, Port Elizabeth	Won	16–28
Match 2	14 May	SARA Invitation XV	Border RU Ground, East London	Won	6–28
Match 3	17 May	Natal	Kings Park Stadium, Durban	Won	15–21
Match 4	21 May	South African Invitation XV	Olën Park, Potchefstroom	Won	19–22
Match 5	24 May	Orange Free State	Free State Stadium, Bloemfontein	Won	17–21
Match 6	27 May	South African Rugby Football Federation Invitation XV	Danie Craven Stadium, Stellenbosch	Won	6–15
Match 7	31 May	South Africa	Newlands Stadium, Cape Town	Lost	26–22
Match 8	4 June	South African Country Districts XV	South West Stadium, Windhoek	Won	7–27
Match 9	7 June	Transvaal	Wanderers Stadium, Johannesburg	Won	12–32
Match 10	10 June	Eastern Transvaal	Pam Brink Stadium, Spring	Won	15–21
Match 11	14 June	South Africa	Free State Stadium, Bloemfontein	Lost	26–19
Match 12	18 June	Junior Springboks	Wanderers Stadium, Johannesburg	Won	6–17
Match 13	21 June	Northern Transvaal	Loftus Versfeld Stadium, Pretoria	Won	9–16
Match 14	28 June	South Africa	Boet Erasmus Stadium, Port Elizabeth	Lost	12–10
Match 15	2 July	South African Barbarians	Kings Park Stadium, Durban	Won	14–25
Match 16	5 July	Western Province	Newlands Stadium, Cape Town	Won	6–37
Match 17	8 July	Griqualand West	De Beers Stadium, Kimberley	Won	19–23
Match 18	12 July	South Africa	Loftus Versfeld Stadium, Pretoria	Won	13–17

== Results ==
=== First Test ===
31 May 1980

South Africa	26–22	British Lions
Try: Louw c W. du Plessis c Van Heerden; Germishuys c Serfontein; Con: Botha (3)	Report	Try: Price; Pen: Ward (5); Drop: Ward

Newlands Stadium, Cape Town
Attendance: 38,170
Referee: F. Palmade (France)

South Africa: Gysie Pienaar, Ray Mordt, David Smith, Willie du Plessis, Gerrie Germishuys, Naas Botha, Divan Serfontein, Morne du Plessis (c), Theuns Stofberg, Rob Louw, Louis Moolman, Moaner van Heerden, Martiens le Roux, Willie Kahts, Richard Prentis

Lions: O'Donnell, Carleton (replaced by Gravell), Richards, Renwick, Slemen, Ward, Patterson, Quinnell, O'Driscoll, Squire, Colclough, Beaumont (c), Price, Wheeler, Williams

=== Second Test ===
14 June 1980

South Africa	26–19	British Lions
Try: Louw; Stofberg c Germishuys; Pienaar c Con: Botha (2); Pen:Botha (2)	Report	Try: O'Driscoll c Gravell; Con: Davies; Pen: Davies (2); Irvine

Free State Stadium, Bloemfontein
Attendance: 57,159
Referee: F. Palmade (France)

South Africa: Gysie Pienaar, Ray Mordt, David Smith, Willie du Plessis, Gerrie Germishuys, Naas Botha, Divan Serfontein, Morné du Plessis (c), Theuns Stofberg, Rob Louw (replaced by Thys Burger), Louis Moolman, Kevin de Klerk, Martiens le Roux, Willie Kahts, Richard Prentis

Lions: Irvine, Carleton, Gravell, Woodward, Hay, Davies (replaced by Campbell), Patterson, Quinnell, O'Driscoll, Squire, Colclough, Beaumont (c), Price, Wheeler, Williams

=== Third Test ===
28 June 1980

South Africa	12–10	British Lions
Try: Germishuys c Con: Botha; Pen: Botha; Drop: Botha	Report	Try: Hay; Pen: Campbell (2)

Boet Erasmus Stadium, Port Elizabeth
Attendance: 49,250
Referee: J.-P. Bonnet (France)

South Africa: Gysie Pienaar, Ray Mordt, David Smith, Willie du Plessis, Gerrie Germishuys, Naas Botha, Divan Serfontein, Morné du Plessis (c), Theuns Stofberg, Rob Louw, Louis Moolman, Moaner van Heerden, Martiens le Roux, Willie Kahts (replaced by Ewoud Malan), Richard Prentis

Lions: Irvine, Woodward, Gravell, Dodge, Hay, Campbell, Patterson, Squire, O'Driscoll, Tucker, Colclough, Beaumont (c), Price, Wheeler, Williams

=== Fourth Test ===
12 July 1980

South Africa	13–17	British Lions
Try: W. du Plessis; Pen: Pienaar (2); Botha	Report	Try: C. Williams; Irvine; O'Driscoll c Con: Campbell; Pen: Campbell

Loftus Versfeld Stadium, Pretoria
Attendance: 68,000
Referee: J.-P. Bonnet (France)

South Africa: Gysie Pienaar, Ray Mordt, David Smith, Willie du Plessis, Gerrie Germishuys, Naas Botha, Divan Serfontein, Morné du Plessis (c), Theuns Stofberg, Rob Louw, Louis Moolman, Moaner van Heerden, Martiens le Roux, Ewoud Malan, Richard Prentis

Lions: Irvine, Carleton, Gravell, Dodge, Hay, Campbell, Robbie, Squire, O'Driscoll, Tucker, Colclough, Beaumont (c), Price, Wheeler, Williams
