= Mordt =

Mordt is a surname. Notable people with the surname include:

- Bjorn Mordt (born 1978), Zimbabwean cricketer
- Nils Mordt (born 1983), rugby player
- Per Edmund Mordt (born 1965), Norwegian football player
- Ray Mordt (born 1957), rugby player
