= Richard Prentis =

South African rugby union footballer

- Born: Richard Basil Prentis; 27 February 1947 (age 79) Krugersdorp, Gauteng, South Africa
- Height: 1.85 m (6 ft 1 in)
- Weight: 105 kg (231 lb)
- School: Brothers of Charity College, Pietersburg

Rugby union career
Amateur team(s)
Years	Team	Apps	(Points)
- Diggers Rugby Club
Provincial / State sides
Years	Team	Apps	(Points)
1974 –	Transvaal		
International career
Years	Team	Apps	(Points)
1980–1981	South Africa	11	

Richard Basil Prentis (born 27 February 1947) is a former South African rugby union player.

== Playing career ==
Prentis played for Transvaal during his provincial career, which began in 1974. He made his international debut for the Springboks against the visiting South American Jaguars team on 26 April 1980. In 1980, he played in all four tests against the Lions and followed it with tests against the South American Jaguars, France and in 1981, Ireland.

During the 1980 Springbok tour to South America, Prentis played in four tour matched and also captained the side against a Paraguay Invitation XV in Asunción. He played in 11 test matches for the Springboks.

=== Test history ===
No.	Opposition	Result (SA 1st)	Position	Tries	Date	Venue
1.	South American Jaguars	24–9	Loosehead prop		26 Apr 1980	Wanderers Stadium, Johannesburg
2.	South American Jaguars	18–9	Loosehead prop		3 May 1980	Kings Park Stadium, Durban
3.	British Lions	26–22	Loosehead prop		31 May 1980	Newlands, Cape Town
4.	(British & Irish Lions) British Lions	26–19	Loosehead prop		14 Jun 1980	Free State Stadium, Bloemfontein
5.	(British & Irish Lions) British Lions	12–10	Loosehead prop		28 Jun 1980	Boet Erasmus Stadium, Port Elizabeth
6.	(British & Irish Lions) British Lions	13–17	Loosehead prop		12 Jul 1980	Loftus Versfeld, Pretoria
7.	South American Jaguars	22–13	Loosehead prop		18 Oct 1980	Wanderers Club, Montevideo
8.	South American Jaguars	30–16	Loosehead prop		25 Oct 1980	Prince of Wales Country Club, Santiago
9.	France	37–15	Loosehead prop		8 Nov 1980	Loftus Versfeld, Pretoria
10.	Ireland	23–15	Loosehead prop		30 May 1981	Newlands, Cape Town
11.	Ireland	12–10	Loosehead prop		6 Jun 1981	Kings Park Stadium, Durban

== See also ==
- List of South Africa national rugby union players – Springbok no. 504
