= Henning van Aswegen =

South African rugby union footballer

- Born: Henning Jonathan van Aswegen; 11 February 1955 (age 71) Okahandja, South West Africa (now Namibia)
- Height: 1.86 m (6 ft 1 in)
- Weight: 100 kg (220 lb)
- School: Windhoek High School, Windhoek
- University: University of the Free State

Rugby union career
- Position: Loosehead prop
Amateur team(s)
Years	Team	Apps	(Points)
1975–1977	UOVS		
1978–1983	Noordelikes		
1984	Germiston Simmer		
1985–1986	Maties		
Provincial / State sides
Years	Team	Apps	(Points)
1977	Free State	14	
1985–1986	Western Province	84	
1984	Transvaal	6	
International career
Years	Team	Apps	(Points)
1981–1982	South Africa	2	

Henning Jonathan van Aswegen (born 11 February 1955 in Okahandja, South West Africa (now Namibia) is a former South African rugby union player.

== Playing career ==
Van Aswegen played for the Free State, Western Province and Transvaal in the South African Currie Cup competition. He was appointed captain of Western Province for the 1985 Currie Cup season and led his team to the Currie Cup title.

Van Aswegen made his debut for the Springboks during the 1981 tour of New Zealand in the first test on 15 August 1981 at Lancaster Park in Christchurch. He played his second and last test match for the Springboks against the South American Jaguars on 3 April 1982 at the Free State Stadium in Bloemfontein when he replaced his provincial teammate, Hempies du Toit after 27 minutes in the second half. Van Aswegen also played in eight tour matches for the Springboks.

=== Test history ===
No.	Opposition	Result (SA 1st)	Position	Tries	Date	Venue
1.	New Zealand	9–14	Loosehead prop		15 August 1981	Lancaster Park, Christchurch
2.	South American Jaguars	12–21	Replacement		3 April 1982	Free State Stadium, Bloemfontein

== See also ==
- List of South Africa national rugby union players – Springbok no. 525
