= Martiens le Roux =

South African rugby union player (1951–2006)

- Born: Marthinus le Roux; 30 March 1951 Wesselsbron, Free State, South Africa
- Died: 14 October 2006 (aged 55) Bloemfontein, Free State, South Africa
- Height: 1.87 m (6 ft 2 in)
- Weight: 107 kg (236 lb)
- School: Wessel Maree High School, Odendaalsrus

Rugby union career
Provincial / State sides
Years	Team	Apps	(Points)
1973	Free State	162	
International career
Years	Team	Apps	(Points)
1980–1981	South Africa	8	

Marthinus 'Martiens' le Roux (born 30 March 1951 – 14 October 2006) was a South African rugby union player.

== Playing career ==
Le Roux played his entire provincial career for the Free State and made 162 appearances for his province. He was part of the Free State team that won the province’s first Currie Cup trophy in 1976.

Le Roux made his test debut for the Springboks on 31 May 1980 at Newlands in Cape Town against the touring British and Irish Lions team, captained by Bill Beaumont. He played in all four tests against the Lions and followed it with tests against the South American Jaguars, France and Ireland. He played in 8 test matches for the Springboks.

=== Test history ===
No.	Opposition	Result (SA 1st)	Position	Tries	Date	Venue
1.	British Lions	26–22	Tighthead prop		31 May 1980	Newlands, Cape Town
2.	(British & Irish Lions) British Lions	26–19	Tighthead prop		14 June 1980	Free State Stadium, Bloemfontein
3.	(British & Irish Lions) British Lions	12–10	Tighthead prop		28 June 1980	Boet Erasmus Stadium, Port Elizabeth
4.	(British & Irish Lions) British Lions	13–17	Tighthead prop		12 July 1980	Loftus Versfeld, Pretoria
5.	South American Jaguars	22–13	Tighthead prop		18 October 1980	Wanderers Club, Montevideo
6.	South American Jaguars	30–16	Tighthead prop		25 October 1980	Prince of Wales Country Club, Santiago
7.	France	37–15	Tighthead prop		8 November 1980	Loftus Versfeld, Pretoria
8.	Ireland	23–15	Tighthead prop		30 May 1981	Newlands, Cape Town

== Death ==
On 14 October 2006, Le Roux and his wife were on their way home after watching the Currie Cup final between the Free State Cheetahs and the Blue Bulls at the Free State Stadium, when they were involved in a motor vehicle accident. Le Roux was seriously injured in the accident and died a few hours later in the Bloemfontein Medi-Clinic.

== See also ==
- List of South Africa national rugby union players – Springbok no. 510
