= Ewoud Malan =

South African rugby union footballer

- Born: Ewoud Malan; 4 July 1953 Groblersdal, Limpopo, South Africa
- Died: 24 October 2023 (aged 70) Pretoria
- Height: 1.83 m (6 ft 0 in)
- Weight: 90 kg (198 lb)
- School: Ben Viljoen High School, Groblersdal
- University: University of Pretoria

Rugby union career
Amateur team(s)
Years	Team	Apps	(Points)
- University of Pretoria
- Pretoria Harlequins
Provincial / State sides
Years	Team	Apps	(Points)
1975 –	Northern Transvaal		
International career
Years	Team	Apps	(Points)
1980	South Africa	2	

Ewoud Malan (4 July 1953 – 24 October 2023) was a South African rugby union player.

== Playing career ==
Malan played for Northern Transvaal and the Springboks. He made his international debut in the third test against the visiting Lions team on 28 June 1980, at the Boet Erasmus Stadium, Port Elizabeth, when he replaced the injured Willie Kahts after 33 minutes in the first half. Malan also played in the fourth test against the Lions.

=== Test history ===
No.	Opposition	Result (SA 1st)	Position	Tries	Date	Venue
1.	British Lions	12–10	Replacement		28 Jun 1980	Boet Erasmus Stadium, Port Elizabeth
2.	(British & Irish Lions) British Lions	13–17	Hooker		12 Jul 1980	Loftus Versfeld, Pretoria

== See also ==
- List of South Africa national rugby union players – Springbok no. 512
