= Hamilton High School (Bulawayo) =

Location
- Bulawayo; Zimbabwe
- Coordinates: 20.189°S 28.581°E

Information
- Type: Public high school
- Established: 1959
- Gender: Boys and Girls

Hamilton High School is a public high school for boys located in Bulawayo, Zimbabwe.

Hamilton High School was ranked 5th out of the top 100 best high schools in Africa by Africa Almanac in 2003, based upon quality of education, student engagement, strength and activities of alumni, school profile, internet and news visibility.

== History ==
Founded in 1959, until 1981 Hamilton High School had just three headmasters – 1959 to 1965 I.H. (Ian Hall) Grant, 1966 to 1975 E.C.W. Silcock, and 1976 to 1981 JPB Armstrong.

== Notable alumni ==
- Bruce Grobbelaar – goalkeeper for Liverpool Football Club
- Gary Crocker – cricketer
- David Smith – rugby player
- Saxon Logan – award-winning filmmaker

== See also ==
- List of schools in Zimbabwe
