= Hoërskool Sentraal =

Coordinates: 29.0865°S 26.2105°E

Location
- Genl Cronje street Bloemfontein, Free State, 9870; South Africa

Information
- Type: Public & boarding
- Motto: Werk en Wen
- Religious affiliation: Christian
- School district: District
- School number: 051 4101800
- Headmaster: Charles Liversage
- Grades: 8–12
- Gender: Boys & Girls
- Age: 14 to 18
- Language: Afrikaans
- Schedule: 07:30 - 16:00
- Hours in school day: 9hours, 30 minutes
- Accreditation: Free State Department of Education
- Website: www.sentraal.co.za

Sentraal High School is a public high school in Bloemfontein in the Free State province of South Africa.

== History ==
On 26 August 1905, the Free Christian School (Vrije Christelike School) was established under the roof of the Reformed Church in Zastron Street, Bloemfontein. It was a humble beginning, when 50 learners were taughtvin their mother tongue by D.F. du Toit (Oom Lokomotief).

The number of learners soon outgrew the capacity of the church building and in 1908, after an education law ensured that the Dutch language alongside English would enjoy equal rights, it was conceded that the Free Christian School could now be converted into a state school.

On 1 July 1908, the name of the school would be changed to the Preparatory Practical School (Voorbereidende Praktiese Skool). A zinc building was erected in which the st. 4 and 5 learners were accommodated. In 1912, the number of pupils has already grown to 163. By 1922 the school had 720 pupils.

== Notable alumni ==
- Nelie Smith, Springboks rugby player, scrumhalf (1963-1965)
- Piet Greyling, Springboks rugby player, flanker (1967-1972)
- Edrich Krantz, Springboks rugby player, wing (1976-1981)
- Neil Powell, South Africa national rugby sevens team rugby player and coach
- Zola Budd, Middle-distance running
- Elize Cawood, actress
- Dr Anna Böeseken, historian.
- Daan Reitmann, nuclear physicist.
