= Thys Burger =

South African rugby union footballer

- Born: Matthys Boshoff Burger; 10 November 1954 (age 72) Pietersburg, South Africa
- Height: 1.95 m (6 ft 5 in)
- Weight: 97 kg (214 lb)
- School: Helpmekaar, Johannesburg

Rugby union career
- Position(s): Loose-forward, Number 8
Amateur team(s)
Years	Team	Apps	(Points)
- Pretoria Police
Provincial / State sides
Years	Team	Apps	(Points)
1976	Northern Transvaal		
International career
Years	Team	Apps	(Points)
1980–1981	South Africa	3	(8)

Matthys Boshoff 'Thys' Burger (born 3 Augustus 1954 in Pietersburg, Limpopo, South Africa) is a former South African rugby union player.

== Playing career ==
Burger played for Northern Transvaal and made his provincial debut in 1976. Burger's first test for the Springboks was on 14 June 1980 in the second test against the touring British Lions team at the Free State Stadium, Bloemfontein, when he replaced Rob Louw late in the second half. He also toured with the Springboks to South America, where he made his first start in a test, as eighthman during the test in Montevideo. He scored his first test try in this match.

Burger was part of the squad that toured to New Zealand and the United States in 1981. He played in the test against the USA, once again as a replacement, this time for Theuns Stofberg and he also scored his second test try in this match.

=== Test history ===
No.	Opposition	Result (SA 1st)	Position	Tries	Date	Venue
1.	British Lions	26–19	Replacement		14 June 1980	Free State Stadium, Bloemfontein
2.	South American Jaguars	22–13	Number 8	1	18 October 1980	Wanderers Club, Montevideo
3.	United States	38–7	Replacement	1	20 September 1981	Owl Creek Polo ground, Glenville, New York

== Personal ==
Burger is the father of Philip Burger, a former professional rugby player and South African sevens (Blitzboks) player. His granddaughter Rume Burger is a South African national sprint champion.

== See also ==
- List of South Africa national rugby union players – Springbok no. 511
