= Hempies du Toit =

South African rugby union footballer

- Born: Pieter Gerhardus du Toit; 23 August 1953 (age 73) Villiersdorp, Western Cape, South Africa
- Height: 1.85 m (6 ft 1 in)
- Weight: 105 kg (231 lb)
- School: Paul Roos Gymnasium, Stellenbosch
- University: Stellenbosch University

Rugby union career
Amateur team(s)
Years	Team	Apps	(Points)
1976–1987	Maties		
Provincial / State sides
Years	Team	Apps	(Points)
1979–1987	Western Province	63	
International career
Years	Team	Apps	(Points)
1981–1984	South Africa	5	

Pieter Gerhardus 'Hempies' du Toit (born 23 August 1953 in Villiersdorp, Western Cape, South Africa) is a former South African rugby union player.

== Playing career ==
After school, du Toit enrolled for a degree in agricultural management at the University of Stellenbosch, where he joined the university's rugby club and played regularly for the Maties from 1976 to 1987. Du Toit made his provincial debut for Western Province in 1979. He also played for representative teams such as the South African Barbarians, the Proteas and the Junior Springboks. In 1980 he represented the Junior Springboks against the touring British Lions team.

Du Toit was first selected for the Springboks in 1980 to tour South America. He did not play in any test matches on the South American tour and made his test debut for the Springboks during the 1981 tour of New Zealand in the first test on 15 August 1981 at Lancaster Park in Christchurch. He played a further four tests for the Springboks, two each against the 1982 South American Jaguars and the 1984 English touring team, respectively. Du Toit also played in 11 tour matches for the Springboks, scoring two non-test tries.

=== Test history ===
No.	Opposition	Result (SA 1st)	Position	Tries	Date	Venue
1.	New Zealand	9–14	Tighthead prop		15 August 1981	Lancaster Park, Christchurch
2.	South American Jaguars	50–18	Tighthead prop		27 March 1982	Loftus Versfeld, Pretoria
3.	South American Jaguars	12–21	Tighthead prop		3 April 1982	Free State Stadium, Bloemfontein
4.	England	33–15	Tighthead prop		2 June 1984	Boet Erasmus Stadium, Port Elizabeth
5.	England	35–9	Tighthead prop		9 June 1984	Ellis Park Stadium, Johannesburg

== See also ==
- List of South Africa national rugby union players – Springbok no. 516
