= UruCup =

Rugby Union Competition

- Current season, competition or edition: 2015 UruCup
- Sport: Rugby union
- Founded: 2015
- No. of teams: 6
- Country: Argentina; Chile; Uruguay; South America
- Most recent champion: Argentina Jaguars (2015)

The UruCup is a rugby union competition that was first held in 2015 (from 8–14 March) at the Estadio Charrúa in Montevideo with Charrúas XV, Argentina Jaguars, South American XV, Chile, Uruguay U20 and Argentina U20 taking part.

Argentina Jaguars are the actual champions.

It is a regional tournament supported by the World Rugby which tries to bring the best players in the region. One big objective is that every year the competition upgrades and can invite teams from other continents.

Both Argentina U20 and Uruguay U20 played the tournament as a preparation for the 2015 World Rugby Under 20 Championship and the 2015 World Rugby Under 20 Trophy respectively.

== Format ==
It has a similar format with tournaments like the IRB Nations Cup in Romania or the IRB Tbilisi Cup in Georgia. The championship will be played in three days, in which there will be three matches per days.

== Teams ==
=== Current teams (2015) ===
- Argentina Jaguars
- Argentina U20
- Chile
- (Uruguay) Charrúas XV
- Uruguay U20
- South American XV

== See also ==
- Americas Rugby Championship
- South American Rugby Championship
