= Philip Burger =

South African rugby union player

- Born: Philip Boshoff Burger; August 28, 1980 (age 46) Pretoria, South Africa
- Height: 1.86 m (6 ft 1 in)
- Weight: 85 kg (187 lb)
- Notable relative(s): Thys Burger (father); Rumé Burger (daughter)

Rugby union career
- Position: Fullback
Senior career
| Years | Team | Apps | (Points) |
| 2008–2011 | Perpignan | 46 | (47) |
Provincial / State sides
| Years | Team | Apps | (Points) |
| 2004–2007 | FS Cheetahs | 25 | (113) |
| 2011–2012 | FS Cheetahs | 17 | (32) |
| 2012 | Griffons (loan) | 5 | (0) |
- Correct as of 27 October 2012
Super Rugby
| Years | Team | Apps | (Points) |
| 2007 & 2011 | Cheetahs | 18 | (20) |
National sevens team
| Years | Team | | Comps |
| 2006 | South Africa 7s | | |

Philip Burger (born 28 August 1980 in Pretoria, South Africa) is a rugby union player.

He is a Springbok Rugby Sevens player, and represented South Africa at the 2006 Melbourne Commonwealth Games. He was the top try scorer at the IRB Sevens tournament in George, South Africa in 2006. He is the son of 3-times capped Bok, Thys Burger.

Burger played Currie Cup rugby for the Free State Cheetahs from 2005 to 2007. In 2006 he was the top try scorer in the Currie Cup competition. Burger won the Currie Cup with the Cheetahs in 2005 and in 2006 (when the Cheetahs shared it with the Bulls). He played Super 14 Rugby for the Cheetahs in 2007. He is in the current squad for the French Club USA Perpignan, in the Heineken Cup and Top 14, and was part of the title winning squad in 2008/09.

According to his father, via social media posts, it was the kwota system that prevent him from becoming a Springbok.

His career was at the same time as with legendary wings Bryton Paulse, Brian Habana and Aswin Willemse.

== Personal ==
His daughter Rumé Burger competes as a sprinter and is a senior national champion over 200 metres.
