= David Smith (rugby union, born 1957) =

South African rugby union footballer

- Born: David John Smith; 9 November 1957 (age 69) Bulawayo, Federation of Rhodesia and Nyasaland
- Height: 1.85 m (6 ft 1 in)
- Weight: 88 kg (194 lb)
- School: Hamilton High School, Bulawayo

Rugby union career
- Position: Centre
Provincial / State sides
Years	Team	Apps	(Points)
- Rhodesia
International career
Years	Team	Apps	(Points)
1980	South Africa	4	

David John Smith (born 9 November 1957 in Bulawayo, Zimbabwe) is a South African former rugby union footballer.

== Playing career ==
Smith grew up in Rhodesia (now Zimbabwe) and played for Rhodesia in the South African Currie Cup competition. In 1980 he and his Rhodesian teammate, Ray Mordt, were selected to represent the Springboks against the touring British and Irish Lions team.

Smith made his debut on 31 May 1980 at Newlands, Cape Town and went on to play in all four tests in the series against the 1980 Lions.

=== Test history ===
No.	Opposition	Result (SA 1st)	Position	Points	Date	Venue
1.	British Lions	26–22	Centre		31 May 1980	Newlands, Cape Town
2.	(British & Irish Lions) British Lions	26–19	Centre		14 June 1980	Free State Stadium, Bloemfontein
3.	(British & Irish Lions) British Lions	12–10	Centre		28 June 1980	Boet Erasmus Stadium, Port Elizabeth
4.	(British & Irish Lions) British Lions	13–17	Centre		12 July 1980	Loftus Versfeld, Pretoria

== See also ==
- List of South Africa national rugby union players – Springbok no. 507
- List of South Africa national under-18 rugby union team players
