= Gerrie Germishuys =

South African rugby union player

- Born: Johannes Servaas Germishuys; 29 October 1949 (age 77) Port Shepstone, South Africa
- Height: 1.83 m (6 ft 0 in)
- Weight: 90 kg (14 st 2 lb)
- School: Brandwag, Benoni

Rugby union career
- Position: Wing
Provincial / State sides
Years	Team	Apps	(Points)
1974–77	Orange Free State		
1980–81	Transvaal		
International career
Years	Team	Apps	(Points)
1974–81	South Africa	20	(48)

Johannes Servaas Germishuys, best known as Gerrie Germishuys (born 29 October 1949 in Port Shepstone, Natal) is a former South African rugby union player who played wing for the Springboks.

== Biography ==
As a winger, Germishuys was known for his speed and agility. His international rugby debut was on 22 June 1974 for the Springboks against the British Lions. He also played against the All Blacks in 1976 and the Lions in 1980. In 1981, he participated in the infamous South Africa rugby team tour of New Zealand. His last cap was on 20 September 1981 against the United States rugby team. He also played in the Currie Cup competition for the provincial teams of the Orange Free State from 1974 to 1977 and the Transvaal from 1980 to 1981.

== National team statistics ==
- 20 selections between 1974 and 1981 for the South African Rugby team
- 48 points (12 tries)
- Selections by year: 1 in 1974, 4 in 1976, 1 in 1977, 9 in 1980 and 5 in 1981

=== Test history ===
No.	Opposition	Result (SA 1st)	Position	Tries	Date	Venue
1.	British Lions	9–28	Wing		22 June 1974	Loftus Versveld, Pretoria
2.	New Zealand	16–7	Wing	1	24 July 1976	Kings Park Stadium, Durban
3.	New Zealand	9–15	Wing		14 August 1976	Free State Stadium, Bloemfontein
4.	New Zealand	15–10	Wing		4 September 1976	Newlands, Cape Town
5.	New Zealand	15–14	Wing		18 September 1976	Ellis Park Stadium, Johannesburg
6.	World XV	45–24	Wing	1	27 August 1977	Loftus Versfeld, Pretoria
7.	South American Jaguars	24–9	Wing	1	26 April 1980	Wanderers Stadium, Johannesburg
8.	South American Jaguars	18–9	Wing		3 May 1980	Kings Park Stadium, Durban
9.	(British & Irish Lions) British Lions	26–22	Wing	1	31 May 1980	Newlands, Cape Town
10.	(British & Irish Lions) British Lions	26–19	Wing	1	14 June 1980	Free State Stadium, Bloemfontein
11.	(British & Irish Lions) British Lions	12–10	Wing	1	28 June 1980	Boet Erasmus Stadium, Port Elizabeth
12.	(British & Irish Lions) British Lions	13–17	Wing		12 July 1980	Loftus Versfeld, Pretoria
13.	South American Jaguars	22–13	Wing		18 October 1980	Wanderers Club, Montevideo
14.	South American Jaguars	30–16	Wing	2	25 October 1980	Prince of Wales Cricket Club, Santiago
15.	France	37–15	Wing	1	8 November 1980	Loftus Versfeld, Pretoria
16.	Ireland	23–15	Wing		30 May 1981	Newlands, Cape Town
17.	Ireland	12–10	Wing		6 June 1981	Kings Park Stadium, Durban
18.	New Zealand	24–12	Wing	1	29 August 1981	Athletic Park, Wellington
19.	New Zealand	22–25	Wing		12 September 1981	Eden Park, Auckland
20.	United States	38–7	Wing	2	20 September 1981	Owl Creek Polo ground, Glenville, New York

== See also ==
- List of South Africa national rugby union players – Springbok no. 465
