= Ockie Oosthuizen =

South African rugby union player (1955–2019)

- Born: Ockert Wessel Oosthuizen; 1 April 1955 Johannesburg, South Africa
- Died: 3 December 2019 (aged 64)
- Height: 1.88 m (6 ft 2 in)
- Weight: 102 kg (225 lb)
- School: Volkskool, Heidelberg

Rugby union career
- Position: Prop
Provincial / State sides
Years	Team	Apps	(Points)
1975–?	Western Transvaal		
1981	Northern Transvaal		
1982–1985	Transvaal		
International career
Years	Team	Apps	(Points)
1981–1984	South Africa	9	(4)

Ockert Wessel "Ockie" Oosthuizen (1 April 1955 – 3 December 2019) was a South African rugby player. He was capped nine times, scoring one try.

== Rugby career ==
Oosterhuizen was born in Johannesburg. He first played for Western Transvaal (now known as the Leopards) as a 20-year-old in 1975, and later moved on to provincial giants Northern Transvaal (Blue Bulls) winning the Currie Cup in 1981 and Transvaal (Golden Lions). He made his international debut against Ireland in 1981 and was part of the ill-fated 1981 South Africa rugby union tour of New Zealand.

Oosthuizen quit rugby in 1985, as he was unhappy with the rugby administration at the time. Along with former Transvaal centre Dries Maritz, he tried to negotiate better financial advantages for their fellow players, which inevitably led to numerous clashes with the powers that be. He later had to appear in front of disciplinary committee after allegations of receiving payment for playing from the Rand Afrikaanse Universiteit (Rand Afrikaans University, now the University of Johannesburg). Although he won the case after an appeal, he was never selected for Transvaal again. He then briefly served as chairman of the now-defunct Randburg RFC, before getting fed up with the politics of the game.

=== Test history ===
No.	Opposition	Result (SA 1st)	Position	Tries	Date	Venue
1.	Ireland	23–15	Reserve		30 May 1981	Newlands, Cape Town
2.	Ireland	12–10	Tighthead prop		6 June 1981	Kings Park Stadium, Durban
3.	New Zealand	24–12	Loosehead prop		29 August 1981	Athletic Park, Wellington
4.	New Zealand	22–25	Loosehead prop		12 September 1981	Eden Park, Auckland
5.	United States	38–7	Loosehead prop		20 September 1981	Owl Creek Polo ground, Glenville, New York
6.	South American Jaguars	50–18	Loosehead prop	1	27 March 1982	Loftus Versveld, Pretoria
7.	South American Jaguars	12–21	Loosehead prop		3 April 1982	Free State Stadium, Bloemfontein
8.	England	33–15	Loosehead prop		2 June 1984	Boet Erasmus, Port Elizabeth
9.	England	35–9	Loosehead prop		9 June 1984	Ellis Park Stadium, Johannesburg

== Life after rugby ==
After his retirement from playing, he went into business and became chairman of a company specializing in financial services. In the early 1990s, he got involved in efforts to restart rugby league in South Africa.

== See also ==
- List of South Africa national rugby union players – Springbok no. 520
- Rugby league in South Africa

== Bibliography ==
- Luyt, Louis (2003). Walking Proud. Don Nelson. ISBN 1-86806-212-0.
