= Rumé Burger =

South African sprinter (born 2008)

Personal information
- Born: 7 February 2008 (age 18) Perpignan, Pyrénées-Orientales, France
- Father: Philip Burger
- Relative: Thys Burger (grandfather)

Sport
- Sport: Athletics
- Event: Sprint

Achievements and titles
- Personal bests: 200m: 23.17 (Eugene, 2026)

Rumé Burger (born 7 February 2008) is a South African sprinter. She won the South African Athletics Championships over 200 metres in 2025.

== Biography ==
At the age of 17 years-old, Burger won the senior South African Athletics Championships gold medal in the women’s 200 metres in a time of 23.49 seconds. She also won the bronze medal in the 100m final in a time of 11.48 seconds. Burger also ran 23.36 seconds to break the SA Schools 200m record in Bloemfontein in 2025. Later that year, she signed a three-year sponsorship deal with sportswear company Nike, with the deal structured as a Name, Image and Likeness so as not to impede potential NCAA eligibility of she decided to accept an offer from the United States after finishing at Sekondêre Meisieskool Oranje in South Africa.

In February 2026, she won the 150 metres in 16.95 seconds ahead of Jada van Staden at the USN Simbine Classic Shootout. In April, she placed third in the 200 metres final at the South African Championships in Stellenbosch, running 23.64 seconds, to finish behind Anestayshia George and new champion Kayla La Grange.

Competing at the 2026 World Athletics U20 Championships in Eugene, Oregon, she qualified for the final of the 200 metres in a time of 23.18 seconds having run a personal best 23.17 in the first round.

== Personal life ==
From Bloemfontein, her father Philip Burger is a former Blitzboks rugby player and her mother Marinda played for the Proteas netball team. Her grandfather Thys Burger was also a rugby player for South Africa.
