= Nils Mordt =

Zimbabwean rugby union player

- Born: Nils Mordt; 5 December 1983 (age 42) Harare, Zimbabwe
- Height: 1.85 m (6 ft 1 in)
- Weight: 91 kg (14 st 5 lb; 201 lb)
- School: South African College Schools; Claires Court School, Maidenhead
- Notable relative(s): Ray Mordt (uncle), Bjorn Mordt

Rugby union career
- Position: Inside Centre fly half
Amateur team(s)
Years	Team	Apps	(Points)
- Maidenhead RFC
Senior career
Years	Team	Apps	(Points)
2004–2008	London Irish	64	(32)
2008–2009	Northampton Saints	3	(3)
2009–2010	Harlequins	9	(0)
2010–2016	Saracens	53	(79)
2014	→Bedford Blues	1	(0)
- Correct as of 14 March 2015
National sevens team
Years	Team		Comps
- England
Medal record
Men's rugby sevens
Representing England
Commonwealth Games
Silver medal – second place	2006 Melbourne	Team competition

Nils Mordt (born 5 December 1983 in Harare, Zimbabwe) is a retired rugby union footballer who played at centre for Saracens and England Sevens.

Mordt is the nephew of South African legend, Ray Mordt.

He played junior rugby at Maidenhead Rugby Football Club, and was part of the U17 National Cup winning Colts side.

On 25 January 2008, Northampton Saints announced that he had signed for the club for the 2008/2009 season from London Irish. Mordt joined Harlequins in 2009. In June 2010, Mordt joined Saracens. He was a replacement as Saracens won their first Premiership title in 2011. He was released by Saracens in 2016.
