= Jada van Staden =

South African athlete (born 2003)

Personal information
- Born: 20 April 2003 (age 23)

Sport
- Sport: Athletics
- Event(s): Sprint, Hurdles

Achievements and titles
- Personal best(s): 400 m: 52.42 (2026); 400 mH 58.59 (2024)

Jada van Staden (born 20 April 2003) is a South African sprinter and hurdler who competes in the 400 metres and over 400 metres hurdles.

== Biography ==
Van Staden began competing in athletics at a young age and had run 54 seconds for the 400 metres by the time she was 15 years-old, but was sidelined through injuries for a period of time, including a fractured hip. In 2020, she won at the Central Gauteng Championships in the 400m hurdles and 100m hurdles although the national championships were later cancelled due to the Covid-19 pandemic. The following year, she represented South Africa at the 2021 World Athletics U20 Championships in Nairobi, Kenya.

Later a student at the University of Pretoria, van Staden was third in the women's 400m final at the 2024 South African Championships, running 52.65 seconds. That year, she set a 400 m hurdles personal best of 58.29 seconds but made the choice to focus on the 400 metres dash.

Van Staden became South African under-23 champion over 400 metres in March 2025. The following month, she was part of the winning Athletics Gauteng North women's 4 x 400 metres relay at the senior South African Championships alongside Zenéy Geldenhuys, Coleen Scheepers and Hannah Van Niekerk. Selected to compete for South Africa, she raced at the 2025 World Athletics Relays in China, in the Mixed 4 × 400 metres relay, placing fifth alongside Hannah Van Niekerk, Mthi Mthimkulu and Tumisang Shezi.

In February 2026, she was runner-up to Rume Burger at the USN Simbine Classic Shootout. In April 2026, she placed second in the 400 metres behind Marlie Viljoen at the South African Championships in wet conditions. She also ran in the women's 4 × 400 metres relay at the championships in Gaborone, Botswana.
