= Elize Cawood =

South African actress (1952–2020)

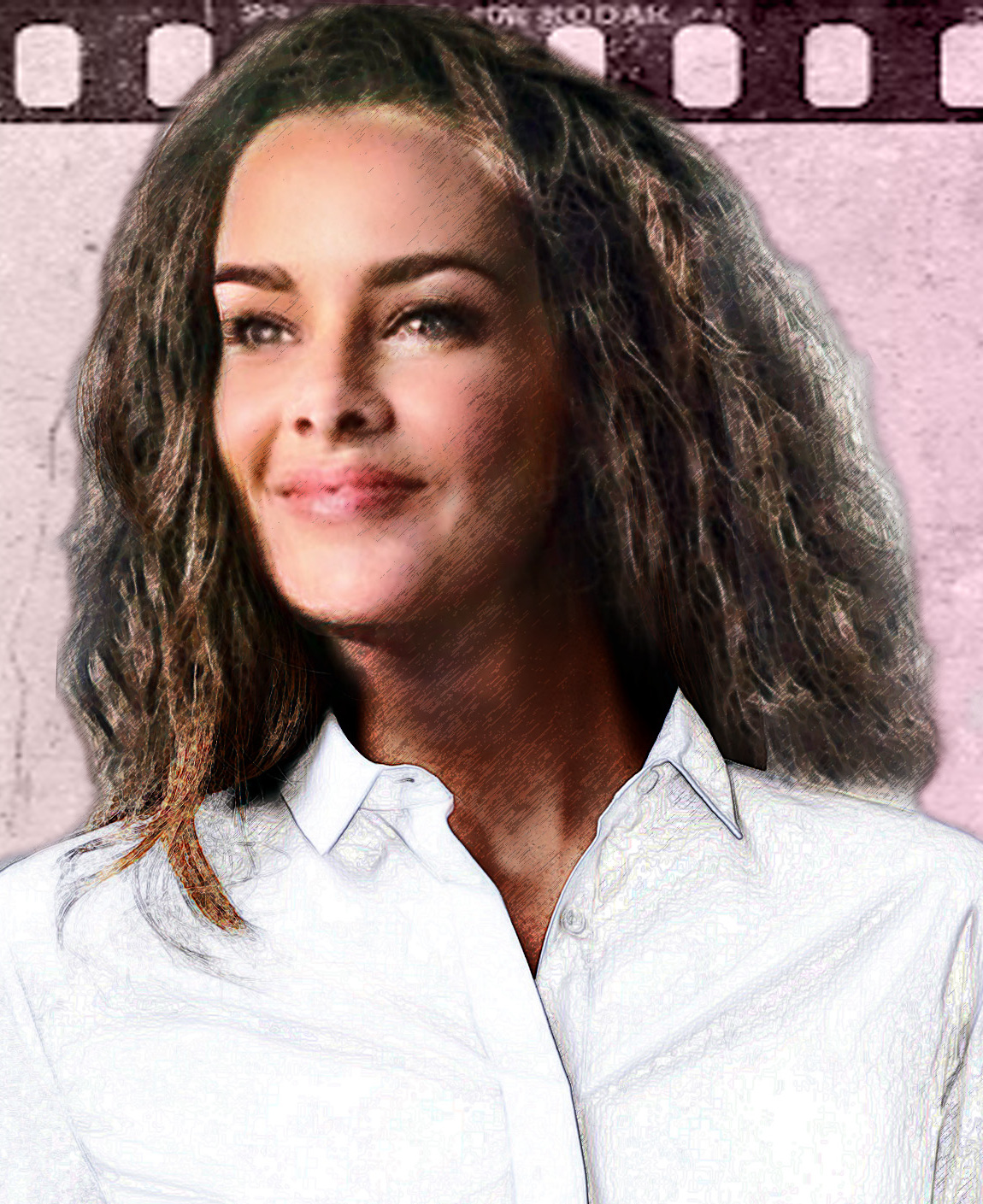
- Born: 28 June 1952; Bloemfontein, Union of South Africa
- Died: 18 July 2020 (aged 68)
- Education: University of the Free State
- Occupation: Actress
- Notable work: Red Dust

Elize Cawood (28 June 1952 – 18 July 2020) was a South African actress. Her most famous TV role is probably that of Pop in Verspeelde lente (1984) and on the silver screen opposite Marius Weyers and Peter Sepuma as the rich Afrikaner woman in Taxi to Soweto. She has also been seen in movies such as Die wonderwerker (2012) and Lien se lankstaanskoene (2012).

== Life and career ==
Elize Cawood was born in 1952 and matriculated at Hoërskool Sentraal in Bloemfontein. She then studied drama at the University of the Free State, where she obtained her B.A. degree. She began her career in 1974 with the then Sukovs. She starred in Paul Ziller's The Effect of Gamma Rays (directed by Ernst Eloff) and Bertolt Brecht's The Good Man of Setzuan (directed by William Egan). She has also performed in school and library programs.

Later she worked at Truk and then became a freelance actress. On stage, she became best known as Olive Schreiner in Stephen Gray's Schreiner - A One Woman Play (directed by Lucille Gillwald), as Elsa in the debut production of Athol Fugard's Road to Mecca in the Market Theater in Johannesburg, and as Stella in Tennessee Williams' A Streetcar Named Desire (translated by Lucas Malan and directed by Bobby Heany).

== Personal life ==
Cawood married actor Wilson Dunster in 1982, with whom she appeared in Paul Slabolepszy's The Art Of Charf and Dinner For One. Her brother Bromley is a film and television director, and her daughter, Jenna Dunster, is also an actress.

Elize Cawood Dunster died on 18 July 2020 at the age of 68 in Cape Town. The cause of her death was lung cancer, which was diagnosed in September 2019.

== Filmography ==
- 1979: Wat Jy Saai
- 1980: Les visiteurs
- 1981: Oh George!
- 1983: Verspeelde Lente
- 1983: Koöperasiestories
- 1986: Arme moordenaar
- 1987: Wolwedans in die Skemer
- 1990: The Fourth Reich
- 1991: Taxi to Soweto
- 1993: Daisy de Melker
- 1999: An Old Wife's Tale
- 2001: Der lange Weg zum Sieg (The Long Run)
- 2001: Lyklollery (Kinofilm; Südafrika)
- 2004: Red Dust
- 2004: Platinum
- 2007: Villa Rosa
- 2007: Andries Plak
- 2009: Isidingo
- 2010: Proesstraat
- 2010: Die Uwe Pottie Potgieter
- 2010: Liefling die Movie
- 2012: Die Wonderwerker
- 2012: Mad Buddies
- 2013: Lien se Lankstaanskoene
- 2014: Pandjieswinkelstories (Pawnshop Stories)
- 2015: Dis ek, Anna
- 2016: Vir Altyd
- 2016: Sy klink soos lente
- 2016: Vir die Voëls
- 2018: Stroomop
