= Edrich Krantz =

South African rugby union footballer

- Born: Eduard Friedrich Wilhelm Krantz; 10 August 1954 (age 72) Senekal, Free State
- Height: 1.83 m (6 ft 0 in)
- Weight: 82 kg (181 lb)
- School: Hoërskool Sentraal, Bloemfontein
- University: University of the Free State

Rugby union career
- Position: Wing
Provincial / State sides
Years	Team	Apps	(Points)
- Free State
-	Northern Transvaal		
International career
Years	Team	Apps	(Points)
1976–1981	South Africa	2	(4)

Eduard Friedrich Wilhelm "Edrich" Krantz (born 10 August 1954) is a former South African rugby union player.

== Playing career ==
Krantz played his senior provincial rugby for the Free State and Northern Transvaal. He was a member of the Free State team that won the Currie Cup in 1976 as well as the Northern Transvaal team that won in 1980.

Krantz made his test match debut for the Springboks against the touring New Zealand side captained by Andy Leslie, on 24 July 1976 at the Kings Park Stadium in Durban and scored a try on test debut. He played one further test match for the Springboks, against the 1981 touring team from Ireland. Krantz also toured with Springboks to South America in 1980 and to New Zealand in 1981. He played 9 matches for the Springboks on tour and scored 11 tries in tour matches.

=== Test history ===
No.	Opposition	Result (SA 1st)	Position	Tries	Date	Venue
1.	New Zealand	16–7	Wing	1	24 July 1976	Kings Park Stadium, Durban
2.	Ireland	23–15	Wing		30 May 1981	Newlands, Cape Town

== See also ==
- List of South Africa national rugby union players – Springbok no. 487
