= Neil Powell =

Namibian rugby union player

- Full name: Johannes Daniel Powell
- Born: 28 June 1978 (age 48) Windhoek, Namibia
- Height: 1.84 m (6 ft 1/2 in)
- Weight: 94 kg (207 lb; 14 st 11 lb)
- School: Hoërskool Sentraal, Bloemfontein
- University: University of the Free State

Rugby union career
- Position: Scrum-half
- Current team: South Africa Sevens
Youth career
- 1998: Free State U21
Amateur team(s)
Years	Team	Apps	(Points)
1998	UFS Shimlas		
Senior career
Years	Team	Apps	(Points)
2000–2003	Free State Cheetahs		
2003	Sharks		
2004–2005	Cats		
2005	Griquas	13	(10)
2006–2007	Blue Bulls	49	(35)
2008	Free State Cheetahs	11	(5)
- Correct as of 8 November 2016
International career
Years	Team	Apps	(Points)
1999	South Africa Under-21		
2001–2003, 2007–2012	South Africa Sevens	91	(117)
- Correct as of 2 January 2023
Coaching career
- Years: Team
- 2013–2022: South Africa Sevens (Head Coach)
- 2022–: Sharks (Director of Rugby)
Medal record
Men's rugby sevens
Representing South Africa
Commonwealth Games
Bronze medal – third place	2010 Delhi	Team competition

Johannes Daniel "Neil" Powell (born 28 June 1978) is a former South African Rugby Union player and currently the director of rugby of the Sharks. He is the former head coach of the South African national rugby sevens team.
