= Tim Cocks =

South Africa international rugby union player

- Born: Timothy Maxwell Delve Cocks; 29 September 1952 (age 74) Durban, South Africa
- Height: 1.77 m (5 ft 10 in)
- Weight: 77 kg (170 lb)
- School: Westville Boys' High School

Rugby union career
Amateur team(s)
Years	Team	Apps	(Points)
- Durban Collegians
Provincial / State sides
Years	Team	Apps	(Points)
1973–1980	Natal	85	
International career
Years	Team	Apps	(Points)
1980	South Africa		

Timothy Maxwell Delve Cocks (born 29 September 1952) is a former South African rugby union player.

== Playing career ==
Cocks represented the Natal Schools team at the 1970 annual Craven Week tournament. After school, Cocks played for the Natal under–20 team and thereafter for the Natal Currie Cup side. In 1979, Cocks was in the South African Barbarians side that toured to the United Kingdom under manager Chick Henderson, alongside players such as Divan Serfontein and Errol Tobias.

Cocks toured with the Springboks to South American during October 1980. He did not play in any test matches on tour, but played in three tour matches, scoring two tries for the Springboks. On thirteen occasions he was selected on the replacement bench for the Springboks, but never made on to the field in a test match.

== See also ==
- List of South Africa national rugby union players – Springbok no. 513
