= Anna Böeseken =

South African academic historian and writer

Anna Jacoba Böeseken
- Born: 23 October 1905; Pretoria, Transvaal Colony
- Died: 28 June 1997 (aged 91); Cape Town
- Occupations: Historian; Writer
- Known for: Authority of history of the Dutch East India Company

Anna Böeseken (born Anna Jacoba Böeseken in Pretoria on 23 October 1905; died on 28 June 1997 in Cape Town) was a South African history academic, journalist and writer who wrote under the pen name AJ. She is best known for her expertise as an authority of the history of the Dutch East India Company that existed between 1602 and 1798.

== Biography ==
Böeseken's parents were originally Dutch. She studied in both South Africa and Europe before the second world war.

She is regarded by modern scholars as one of the leading experts on the history and evolution of the Dutch East India Company. The 2013 publication in the journal Historia volume 48, Issue 2, titled "Historia - Dr. Anna Boëseken (1905-1997) : kenner van die Kaapse VOC-geskiedenis (English: Expert of Cape VOC history) "examined her contribution in making the history of the VOC in South Africa accessible and interpreting it for both the expert and layman".

On June 18, 1964 she founded the Genealogical Society which published a quarterly journal Familia.
