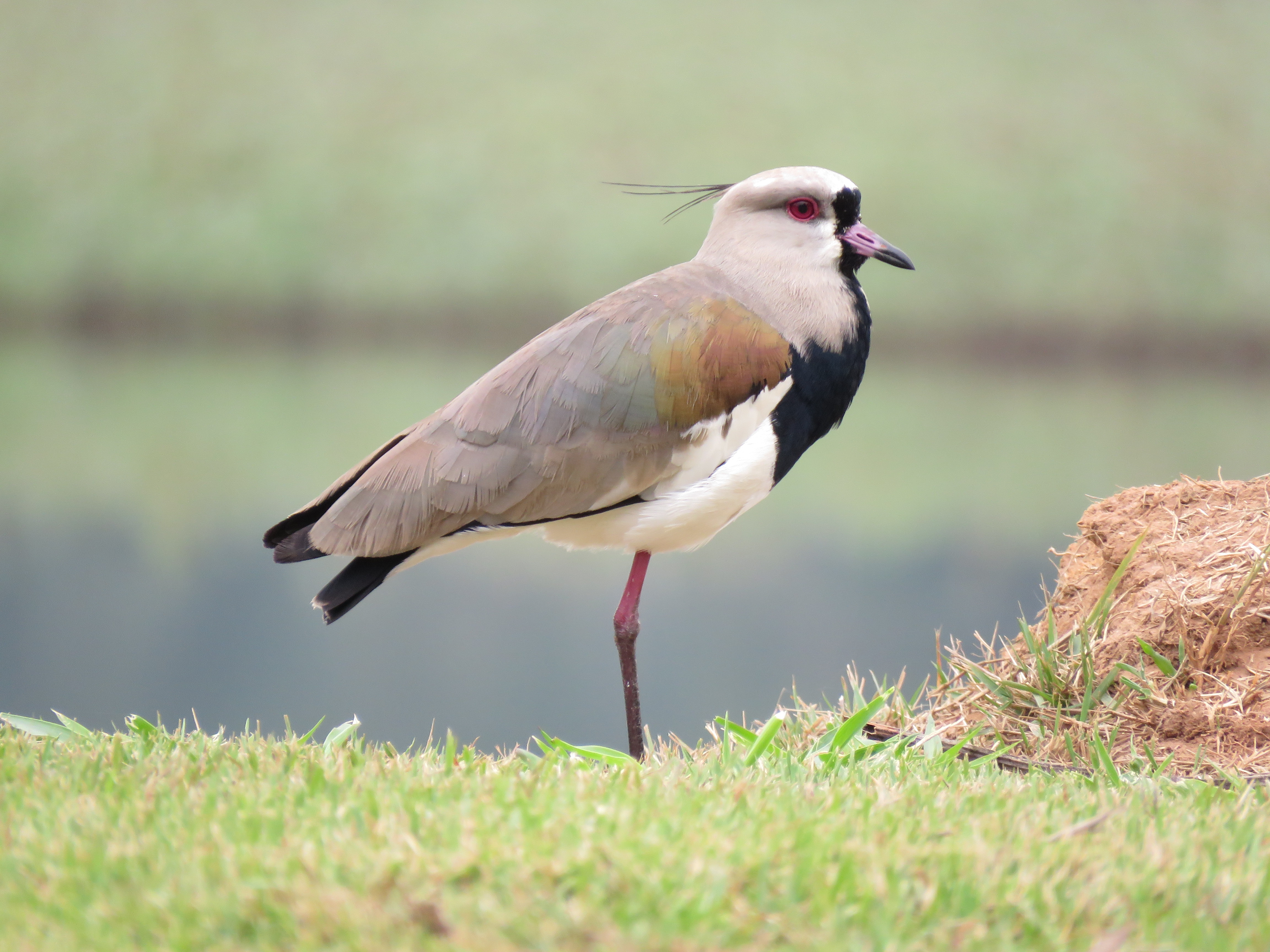

Conservation status
- Least Concern (IUCN 3.1)

Scientific classification
- Kingdom: Animalia
- Phylum: Chordata
- Class: Aves
- Order: Charadriiformes
- Family: Charadriidae
- Genus: Vanellus
- Species: V. chilensis

Binomial name
- Vanellus chilensis (Molina, 1782)

Subspecies
- 3-4 (see text)

Synonyms
- Parra chilensis Molina, 1782; Belonopterus chilensis (Molina, 1782); Vanellus grisescens Grant, 1912; Dorypaltus prosphatus Brodkorb, 1959 and see text

= Southern lapwing =

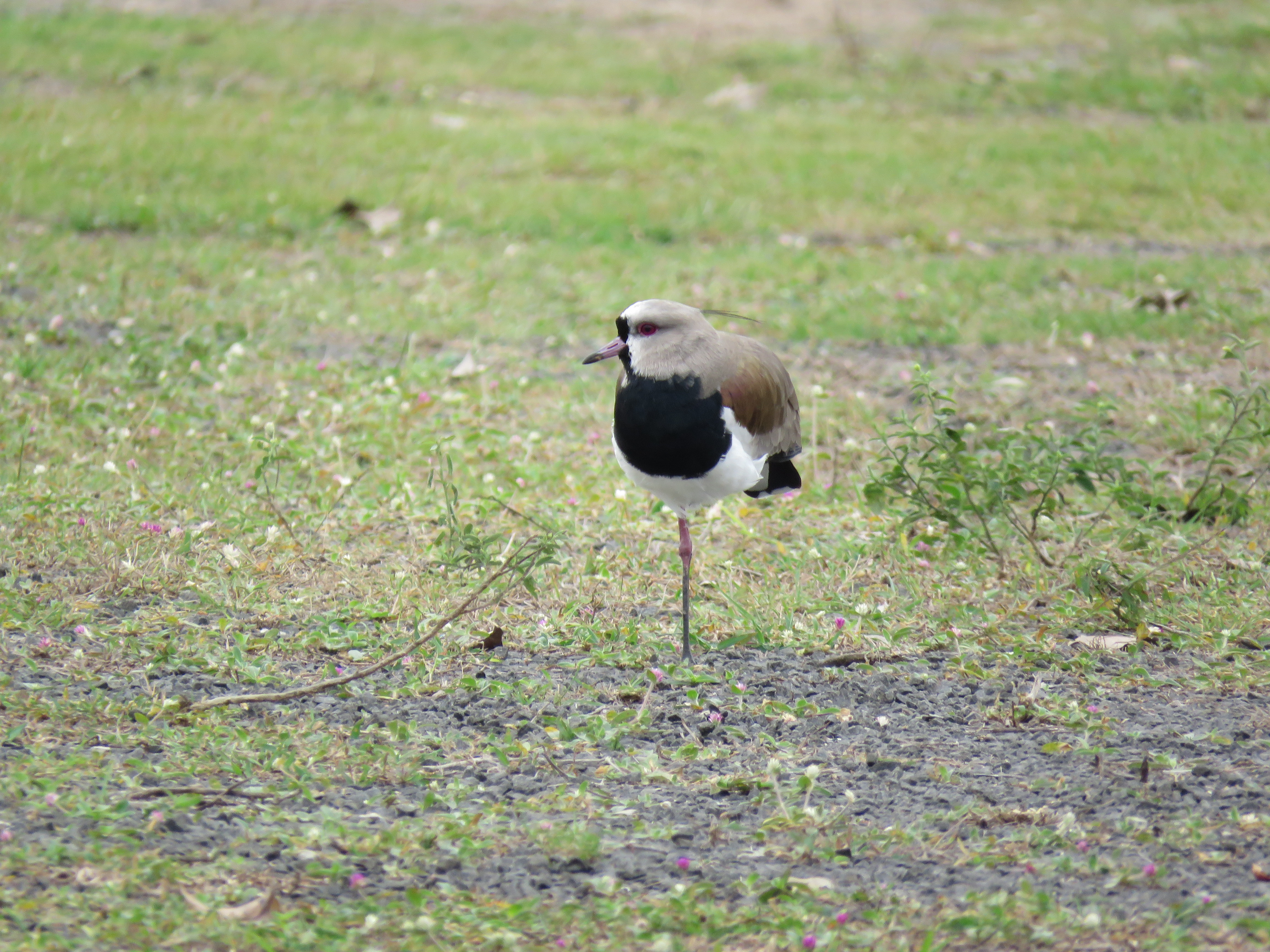
Southern Lapwing observed in Indaiatuba, SP, Brazil.

The southern lapwing (Vanellus chilensis), commonly called quero-quero in Brazil, or tero in Argentina and Uruguay, tero-tero in Paraguay, and queltehue in Chile is a wader in the order Charadriiformes. It is a common and widespread resident throughout South America, except in densely forested regions (e.g. most of the Amazon), the higher parts of the Andes, and the arid coast of a large part of western South America. This bird is particularly common in the basin of the Río de la Plata. It has also been spreading through Central America in recent years. It reached Trinidad in 1961, Tobago in 1974, and has rapidly increased on both islands, sporadically making its way North to Barbados where one pair mated, nested, and produced chicks in 2007.

== Description ==
This lapwing is the only crested wader in South America. It is 32 to 38 cm (13 to 15 in) in length and weighs approximately 250 to 425 g (8.8 to 15.0 oz). The upperparts are mainly brownish grey, with a bronze glossing on the shoulders. The head is particularly striking; mainly grey with a black forehead and throat patch extending onto the black breast. A white border separates the black of the face from the grey of the head and crest. The rest of the underparts are white and the eye ring, legs, and most of the bill are pink. It is equipped with red bony extensions under the wings (spurs), used to intimidate foes and fight birds of prey.

During its slow flapping flight, the southern lapwing shows a broad white wing bar separating the grey-brown of the back and wing coverts from the black flight feathers. The rump is white and the tail black. The call is a very loud and harsh keek-keek-keek.

There are three or four subspecies, differing slightly in head coloration and voice. Vanellus chilensis fretensis from Patagonia is sometimes included in the nominate subspecies V. c. chilensis. The northern subspecies—V. c. cayennensis from the north and V. c. lampronotus from the south of the Amazon River—are sometimes separated as a distinct species, Vanellus cayennensis. These two subspecies have a browner head—particularly the northernmost birds—and the white face band (broad in the northern and narrow in the southern one) does not reach to the center of the crown. However, birds from the general region of Uruguay apparently intergrade.

== Fossil record ==
In prehistoric times, the species seems to have been more widespread. Late Pleistocene lapwing bones from Florida were initially described as Dorypaltus prosphatus but have since been regarded as indistinguishable from those of the southern lapwing of the time, except by being smaller. Though they may not be specifically distinct, the lack of this bird's occurrence out of South America on a regular basis today suggests that they may be better considered a paleosubspecies V. c. prosphatus. This would have disappeared as the last ice age ended, but biogeography suggests that the species must also have occurred in Central America and/or the Caribbean. The entirely extinct prehistoric species V. downsi is closely related to the southern lapwing found in California; its remains have been found at the La Brea Tar Pits in Los Angeles. Separated by the Rocky Mountains, V. downsi makes an unlikely ancestor to the southern lapwing, but it is certainly possible that it was a northwestern sister species.

== Ecology ==
This is a lapwing of lake and river banks or open grassland. It has benefited from the extension of the latter habitat through widespread cattle ranching. When nesting in the vicinity of airports, it poses a threat to the safety of aerial traffic. Its food is mainly insects (such as grasshoppers) and other small invertebrates (including earthworms and cutworms), as well as small fish, hunted using a run-and-wait technique mainly at night, often in flocks. In urban areas like Rio de Janeiro, Montevideo, Buenos Aires and La Plata it can even be seen feeding or walking on parks or floodlit soccer pitches during televised matches.

The southern lapwing breeds cooperatively in social groups and that social group consists of a breeding pair with one or two young from the previous breeding season. They breed on grassland and sometimes on ploughed fields, and have an aerobatic flapping display flight. It lays 2–3 (rarely 4) olive-brown eggs in a bare ground scape. The nest and young are defended noisily and aggressively against all intruders (including humans) by means of threats, vocalizations, and low flights. After the breeding season, it disperses into wetlands and seasonally-flooded tropical grassland.

== Gallery ==
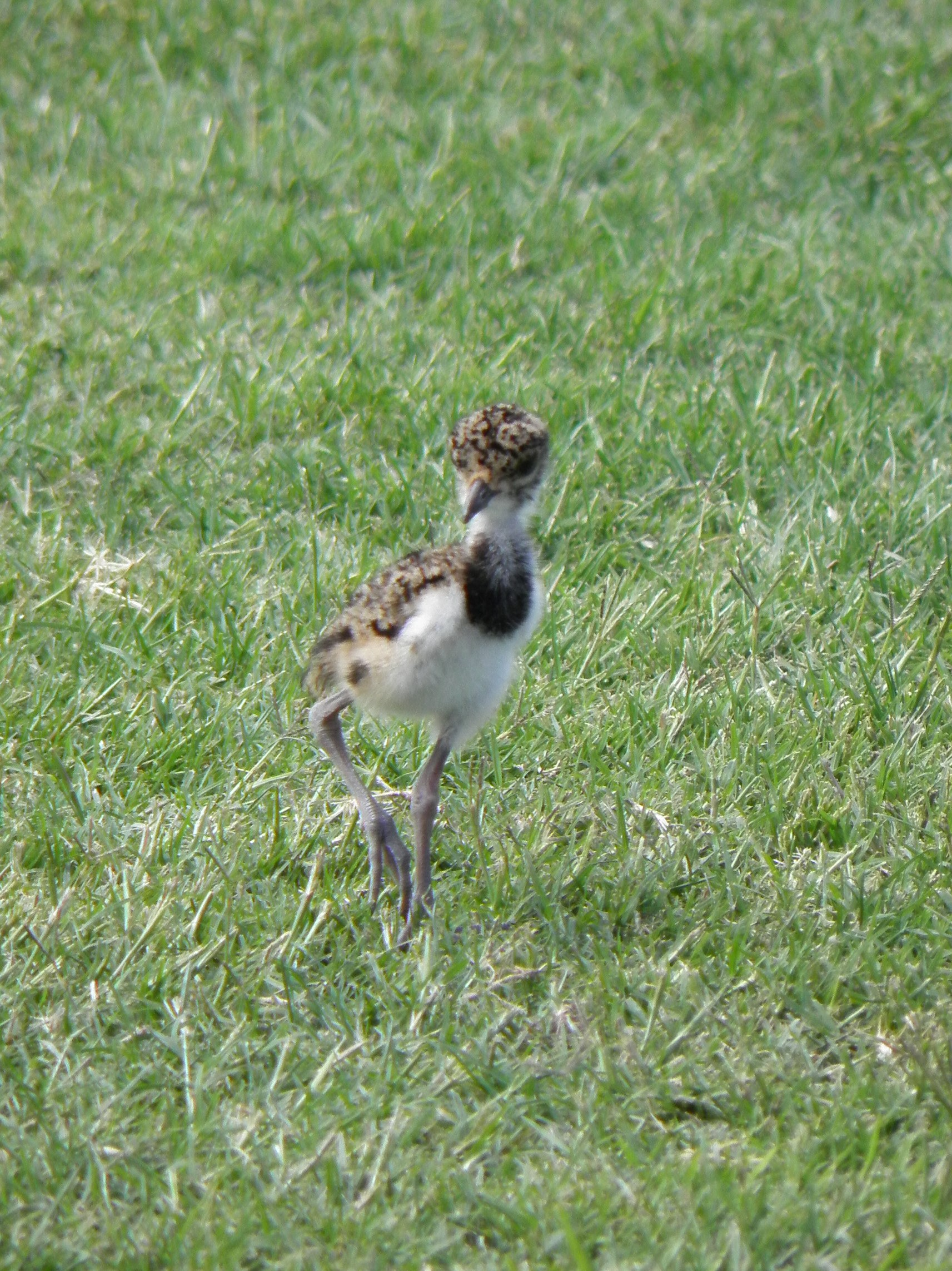
Southern lapwing chick

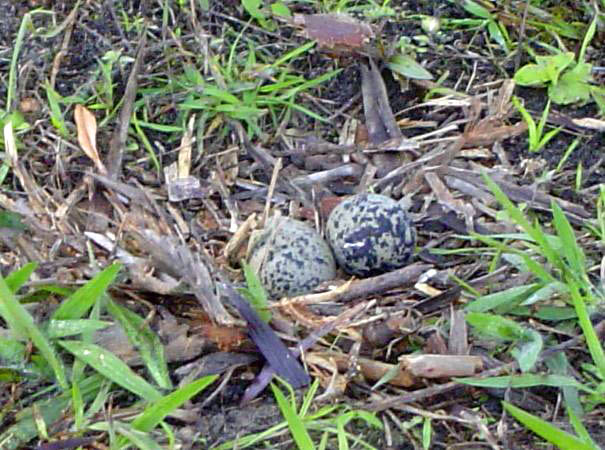
Nest of V. c. lampronotus with small clutch

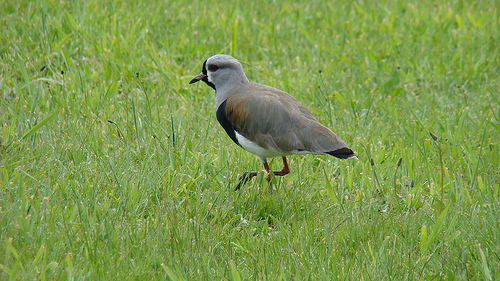
V. c. chilensis (Valdivia, Chile)

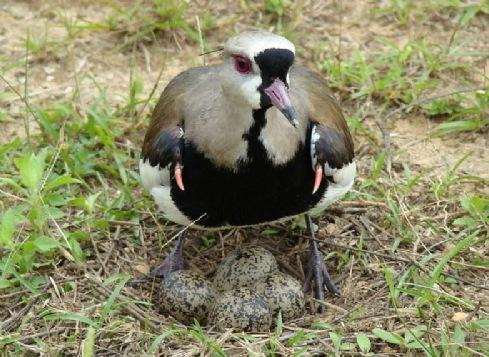
Nesting V. c. lampronotus threatening photographer. Note spurs protruding from wrists.

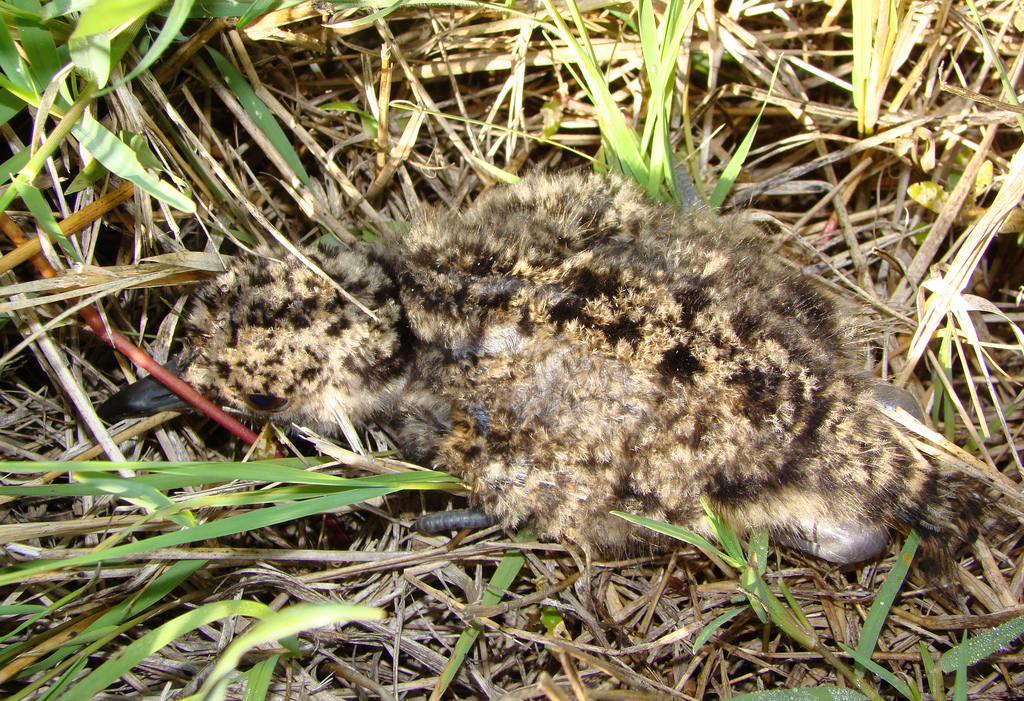
Chick

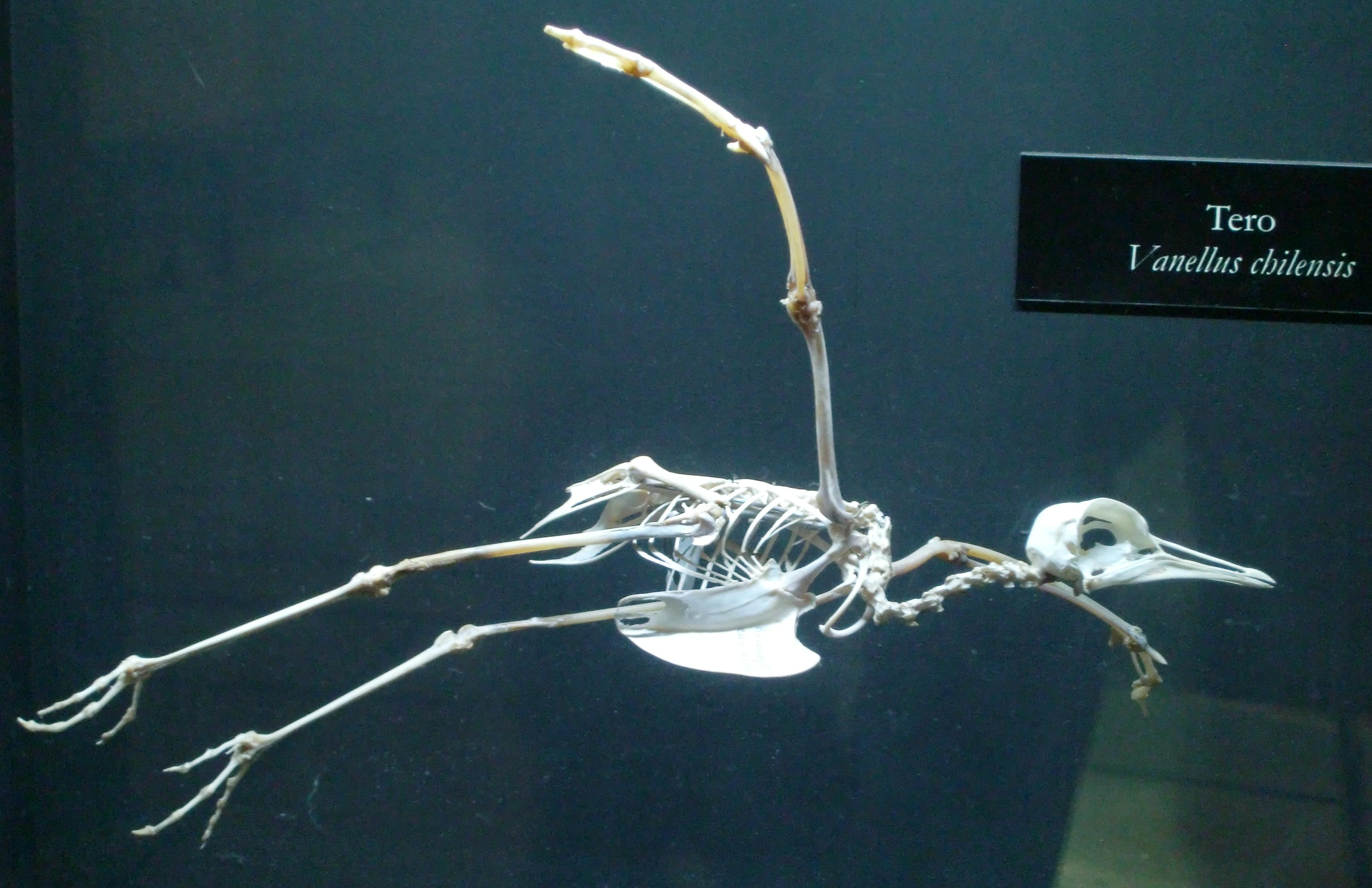
Skeleton

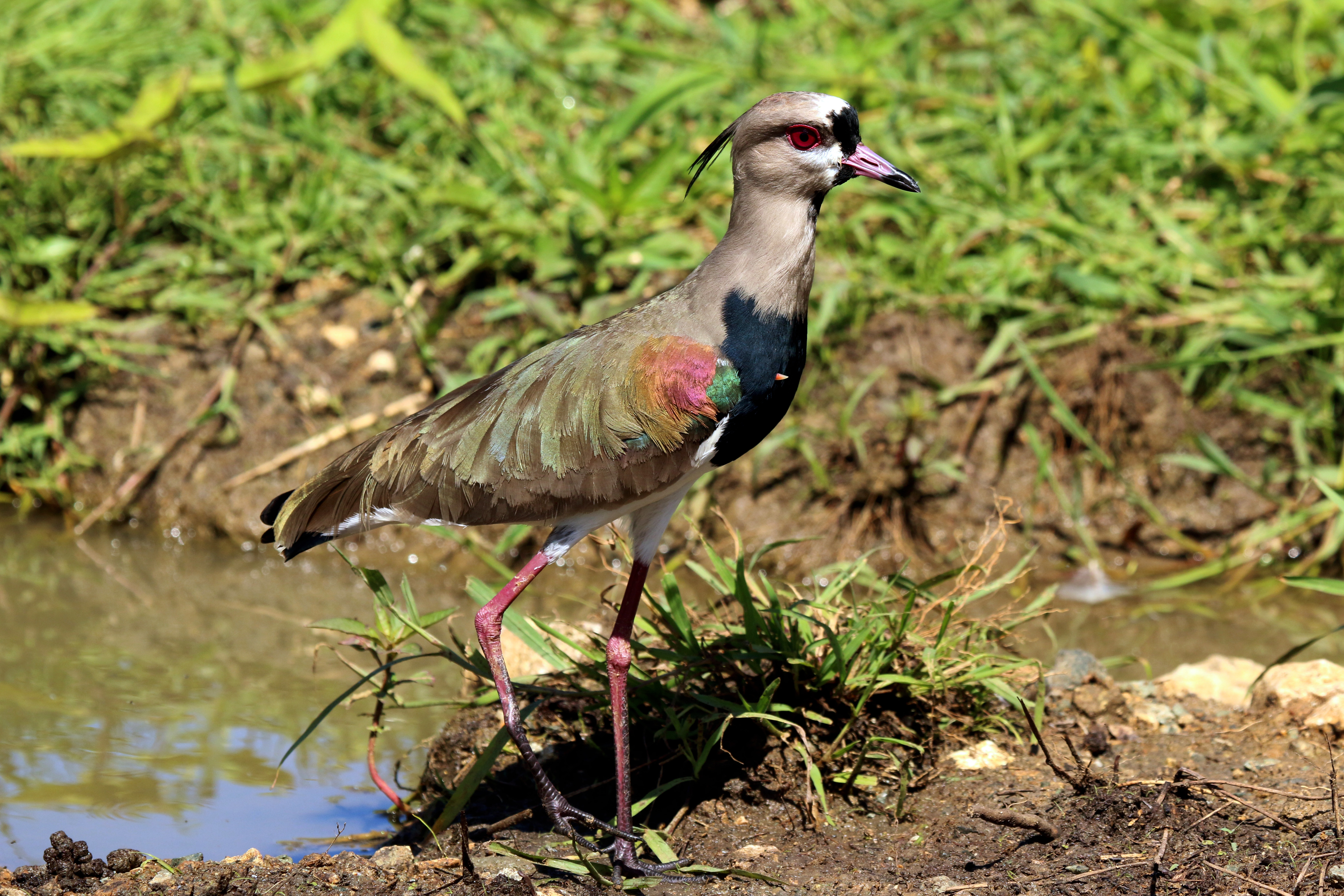
V. c. cayennensis, Tobago

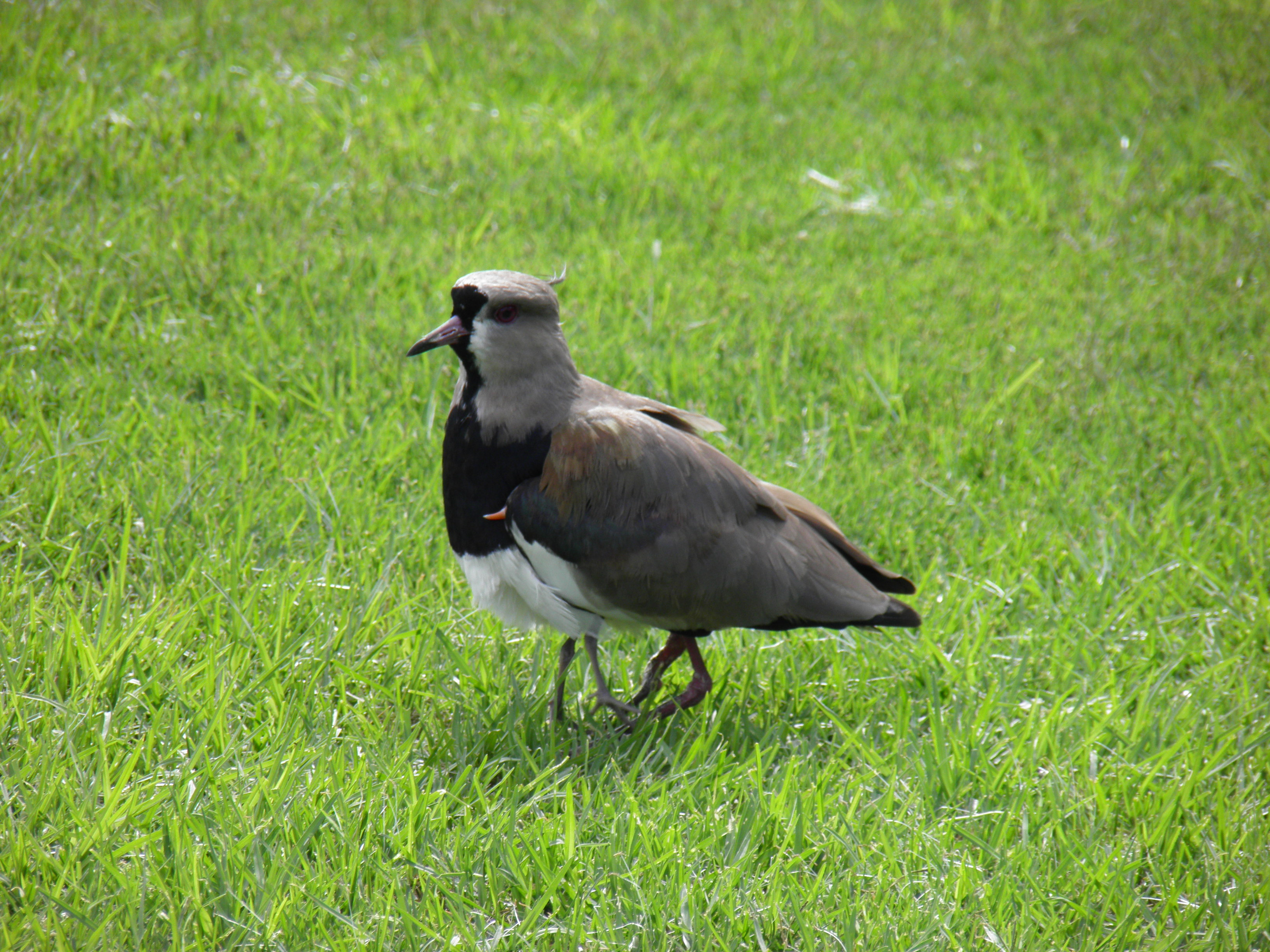
Southern lapwing with youngster under wings

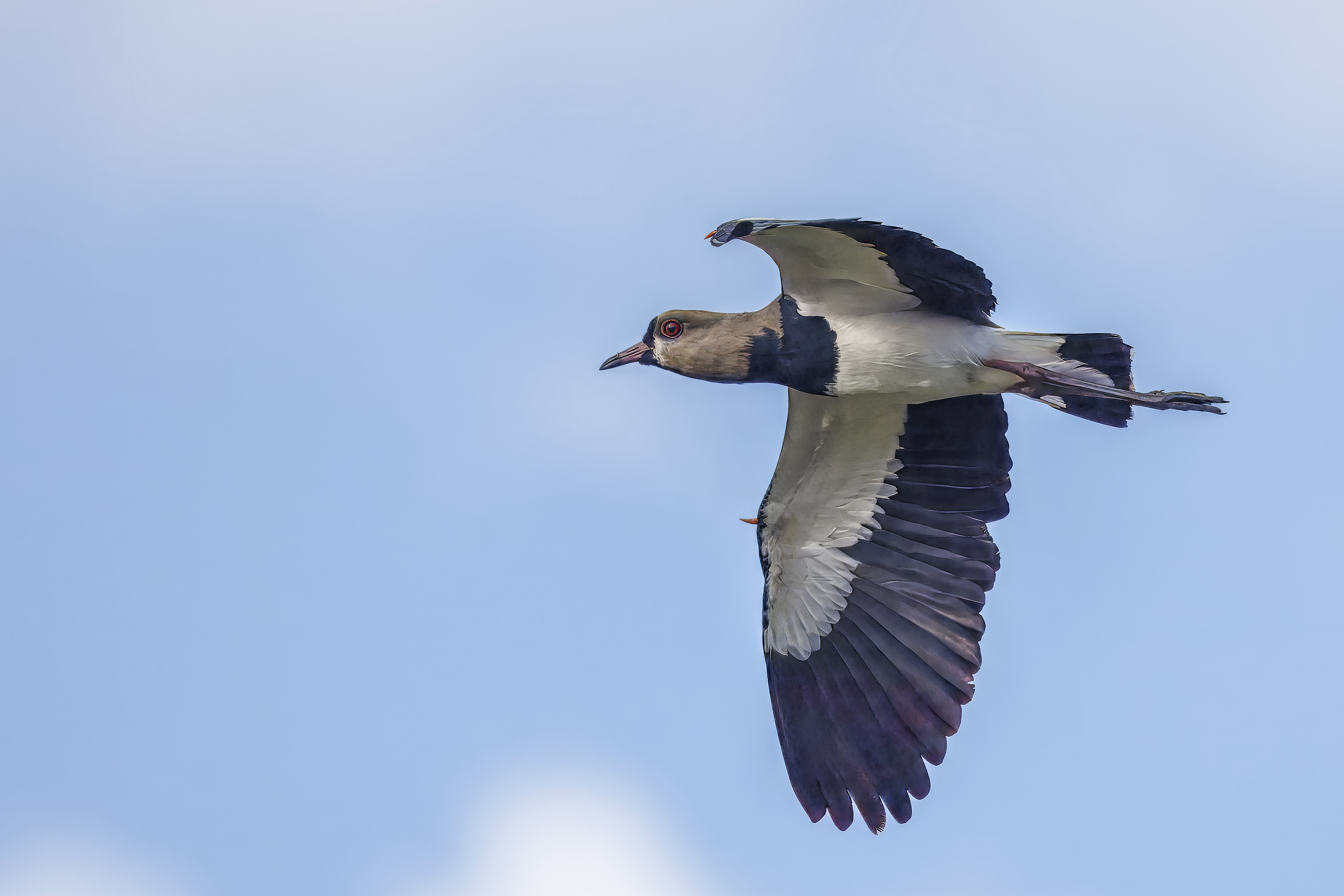
V. c. cayennensis, Ecuador

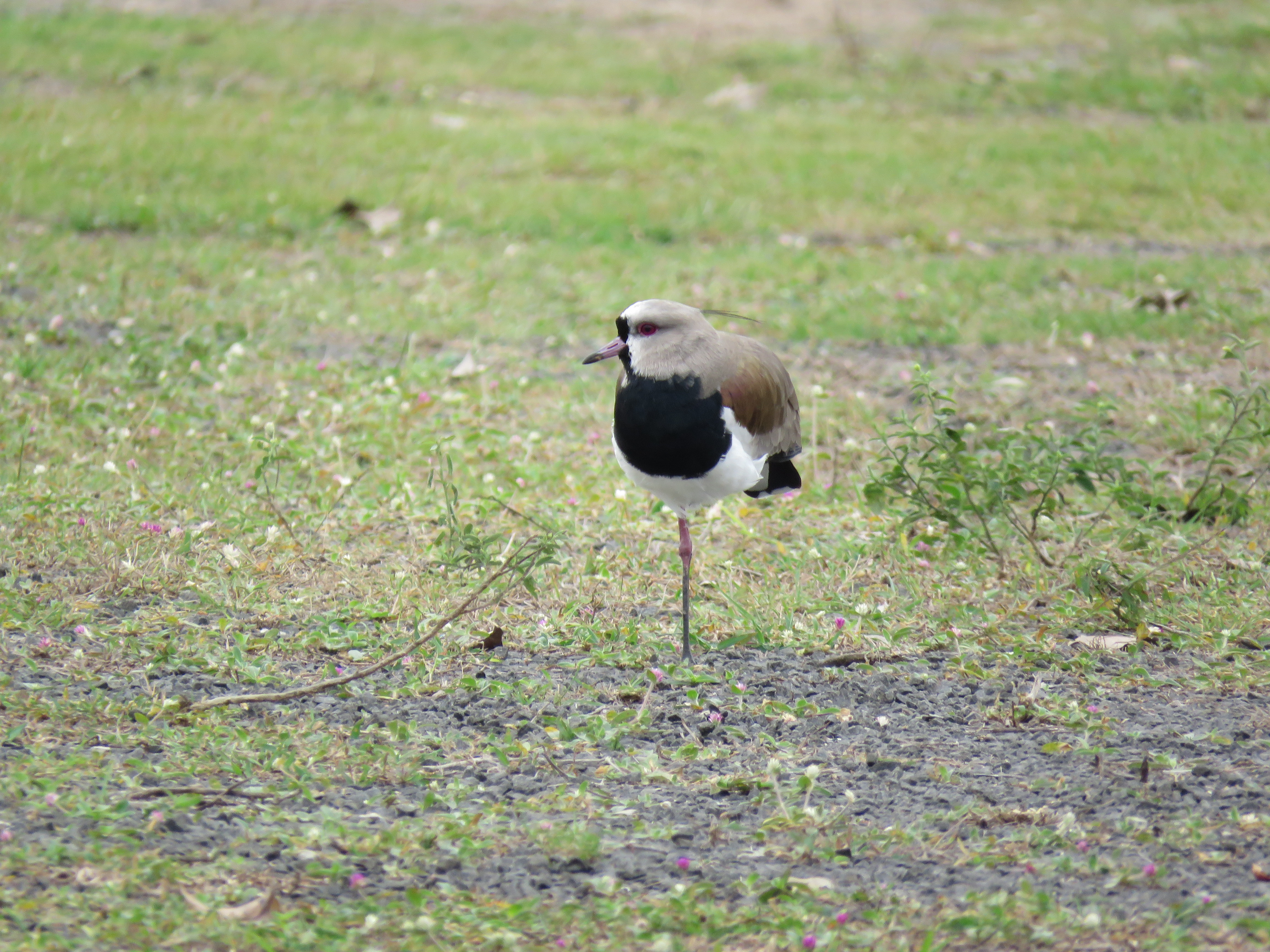
A Southern Lapwing observed in the Parque do Mirim, Indaiatuba, SP, Brazil

== Bibliography ==
- ffrench, Richard; O'Neill, John Patton; Eckelberry, Don R. (1991). A Guide to the Birds of Trinidad and Tobago (2nd ed.). Ithaca, N.Y.: Comstock Publishing. ISBN 978-0-8014-9792-6.
- Hayman, Peter; Marchant, John; Prater, Tony (1986). Shorebirds: an identification guide to the waders of the world. Boston: Houghton Mifflin. ISBN 978-0-395-60237-9.
- Hilty, Steven L. (2003). Birds of Venezuela. Princeton University Press. ISBN 978-0-7136-6418-8.
