= Willie Kahts =

South African rugby union footballer

- Born: Wilhelm Julius Heinrich Kahts; 20 February 1947 (age 79) Pretoria, South Africa
- Height: 1.80 m (5 ft 11 in)
- Weight: 94 kg (207 lb)
- School: Volksrust High School, Volksrust

Rugby union career
- Position: Hooker
Provincial / State sides
Years	Team	Apps	(Points)
- Northern Transvaal
International career
Years	Team	Apps	(Points)
1980–1982	South Africa	11	(4)

Wilhelm Julius Heinrich Kahts (born 20 February 1947 in Pretoria, South Africa) is a former South African rugby union player.

== Playing career ==
Kahts made his test debut for the Springboks on 31 May 1980 at Newlands in Cape Town against the touring British and Irish Lions team, captained by Bill Beaumont. He scored his first and only test try during his sixth test match and first at his home ground, Loftus Versveld, on 8 November 1980 against the touring French team.

His last test match, was the losing test against the South American Jaguars of Hugo Porta in Bloemfontein on 3 April 1982.

=== Test history ===
No.	Opposition	Result (SA 1st)	Position	Tries	Date	Venue
1.	British Lions	26–22	Hooker		31 May 1980	Newlands, Cape Town
2.	(British & Irish Lions) British Lions	26–19	Hooker		14 June 1980	Free State Stadium, Bloemfontein
3.	(British & Irish Lions) British Lions	12–10	Hooker		28 June 1980	Boet Erasmus Stadium, Port Elizabeth
4.	South American Jaguars	22–13	Hooker		18 October 1980	Wanderers Club, Montevideo
5.	South American Jaguars	30–16	Hooker		25 October 1980	Prince of Wales Country Club, Santiago
6.	France	37–15	Hooker	1	8 November 1980	Loftus Versveld, Pretoria
7.	Ireland	23–15	Hooker		30 May 1981	Newlands, Cape Town
8.	Ireland	12–10	Hooker		6 June 1981	Kings Park Stadium, Durban
9.	New Zealand	24–12	Hooker		29 August 1981	Athletic Park, Wellington
10.	South American Jaguars	50–18	Hooker		27 March 1982	Loftus Versfeld, Pretoria
11.	South American Jaguars	12–21	Hooker		3 April 1982	Free State Stadium, Bloemfontein

== See also ==
- List of South Africa national rugby union players – Springbok no. 509
