= Saxon Logan =

Film director, writer and producer

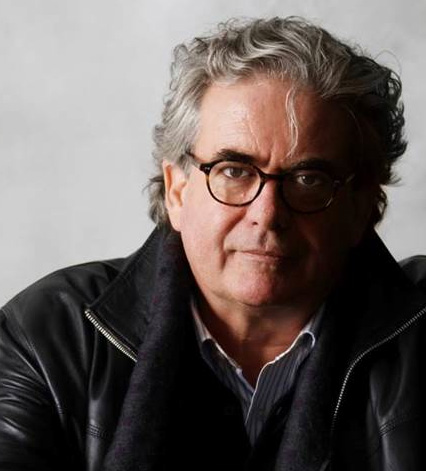
- Born: Hale, United Kingdom
- Citizenship: British
- Occupation: Director

Saxon Logan FRGS (born 8 September 1956) is a British born South African based film director, writer and producer. Logan is known for his singular documentary and narrative filmmaking and was the winner of an Emmy award for his work on The Lake That Made a Dent. A Nichiren Buddhist for 4 decades.

== Personal life ==
Saxon grew up in Rhodesia. For reasons he cannot explain he knew he wanted to make films from an early age. He was expelled from his High School Hamilton, having been caught reading Playboy magazines. At the age of 18 he was required to join the Rhodesian Army under conscription laws, however, due to identifying as an objector, he faced detention. His mother assisted him in escaping the Rhodesian authorities and his return to Britain. He could not study filmmaking as there were no film schools affordable at that time. After working odd jobs he contacted Lindsay Anderson as he was so struck by Anderson's If..... Lindsay Anderson recognised Logan as a vocationally iconoclastic artist. And thus formed a mentor pupil relationship. Logan served an apprenticeship with director Lindsay Anderson at the Theatre Upstairs at the Royal Court. At nineteen years of age he directed his first play Doctor Galley with Henry Woolf at the Traverse Theatre at the Edinburgh Festival. This transferred to the Soho Poly in the West End. Lindsay Anderson financed Logan's first short film, which was acquired by the British Film Institute and supported Polanski's The Tenant in Cinemas. His short film gave Anderson a return of GBP 11 profit on his investment. Lindsay Anderson was Best Man at Saxon Logan's wedding.

== Career ==
During his apprenticeship with Lindsay Anderson he worked in various departments including locations research, props department, and assistant editor. Following this apprenticeship, Lindsay Anderson made him his personal assistant on O Lucky Man!. They formed a deep friendship. "You are the lucky man", Lindsay exclaimed. Logan joined BBC TV where he worked as a producer on BBC Art's stand Omnibus amongst others. He made a documentary on Sir Dirk Bogarde ( according to Bogarde, his friend Charlotte Rampling said "his was a fine performance from an obviously great director").and Sculpture, Raymond Mason as well as his acclaimed Working Surface, starring Joanna David and Bill Douglas. Subsequent to his departure from BBC he worked as an independent producer/director and created work for Channel 4 and ITV.

His documentaries have often centred around environmental and societal issues. Place of The Skulls focussed on the plight of Ivory trade, and led to a ban on the ivory trade, which earned him an Academy Award. Black Rhino: the last stand, which focused on the dwindling number of black Rhinos in Africa saw him win the IDFA Gold Medal, African Hunter focused on big game hunting and was screened by National Geographic to great acclaim. As a result of his documentary work he was made an Honorary Fellow of The Royal Geographical Society.

In addition to documentary filmmaking he has directed several feature/narrative films. He made the super cult film Sleepwalker with Bill Douglas, Nick Grace and Joanna David. It was held over for numerous screenings at The Berlin Film Festival. As a vocational film maker Logan only makes films that he takes a personal interest in. On viewing Sleepwalker, Jean Luc Godard is known to have said: "at least there is one committed filmmaker in Britain". Logan identifies as a Scottish filmmaker, in the tradition of Alexander MacKenzie, Robert Hamer, Bill Douglas, Lynne Ramsay and Lindsay Anderson.

== Awards ==
Logan is known for his documentary filmmaking and was the winner of an Emmy award for his work on The Lake That Made a Dent and was made an Honorary Fellow of The Royal Geographical Society. He also received an honorary mention from the American Academy of Motion Picture Arts and Sciences for his work on Place of Skulls. He received an award at the Berlin Film Festival for his feature film Sleepwalker. He is currently working on a streamer drama film series of Doctor David Livingstone's failed Zambezi Expedition, Produced by Lucas Foster.

== Filmography ==
=== Films ===
| Year | Title | Notes |
|---|---|---|
| 1977 | Stepping Out Winner of Le Touquet best film award. | Short |
| 1982 | Omnibus with Dirk Bogarde | Documentary |
| 1984 | Sleepwalker Jury Award Berlin. | Also writer |
| 1986 | African Hunter | Documentary |
| 1987 | Black Rhino | Documentary |
| 1989 | A Place of Skulls | Honorary Mention |
| 1989 | The Lake That Made A Dent | Emmy Award |
| 1991 | Fragile Earth | Documentary |
| 2016 | Sylvia - Tracing Blood | Also writer |
