= Bjorn Mordt =

Zimbabwean cricketer (born 1978)

Personal information
- Full name: Bjorn Haaken David Mordt
- Born: 29 June 1978 (age 48); Umtali, Manicaland, Rhodesia
- Batting: Right-handed
- Bowling: Right-arm medium

Domestic team information
- Years: Team
- 2003–2012: Berkshire

Career statistics
Competition	List A
Matches	2
Runs scored	44
Batting average	22.00
100s/50s	–/–
Top score	43
Balls bowled	–
Wickets	–
Bowling average	–
5 wickets in innings	–
10 wickets in match	–
Best bowling	–
Catches/stumpings	–/–
- Source: Cricinfo, 11 October 2011

Bjorn Haaken David Mordt (born 29 June 1978) is a Zimbabwean cricketer. Mordt is a right-handed batsman who bowls right-arm medium pace. He was born at Mutare, Manicaland Province.

Mordt joined English county Berkshire in 2003, making his debut for the county in that season's Minor Counties Championship against Shropshire. Between 2003 and 2012, he made 52 Minor Counties Championship appearances and 31 MCCA Knockout Trophy appearances. When Berkshire were permitted to take part in the Cheltenham & Gloucester Trophy alongside the first-class counties, Bjorn made two List A appearances in that competition. The first of these came against Kent in the 2004 competition, with him scoring a single run before he was dismissed by Martin Saggers in a match which Kent won by 9 wickets. The second of these came against Gloucestershire in the 2005 competition, with Mordt top scoring with 43 runs before he was dismissed by Martyn Ball, with Gloucestershire winning by 85 runs. He has captained Berkshire since 2007, which included leading them to the Minor Counties Championship in 2008.
