= Louis Moolman =

South African rugby union footballer

- Born: Louis Christiaan Moolman; 21 January 1951 Pretoria, Gauteng, South Africa
- Died: 10 February 2006 (aged 55) Kempton Park, Gauteng, South Africa
- Height: 1.95 m (6 ft 5 in)
- Weight: 111 kg (245 lb)
- School: Hoërskool Verwoerdburg

Rugby union career
Provincial / State sides
Years	Team	Apps	(Points)
1974–1986	Northern Transvaal	171	
International career
Years	Team	Apps	(Points)
1977–1986	South Africa	24	

Louis Christiaan Moolman (21 January 1951 - 10 February 2006) was a Northern Transvaal and Springboks Rugby Union player. He was born in Pretoria, South Africa and went to school at Hoërskool Verwoerdburg. He played in the lock position.

== Playing career ==
Moolman played his first test for the Boks on 27 August 1977 against a World Invitation Side at Loftus Versfeld, Pretoria. He played his last test on 31 May 1986 against the New Zealand Cavaliers at Ellis Park Stadium, Johannesburg at the age of 35. In total he played in 24 tests.

Moolman was a solid lock forward and was an impressive sight with his bulk and thick beard (1.95m and 111 kg) driving upfield with the ball in hand. He represented Northern Transvaal in 171 matches over a period of 13 seasons (1974–86). Only Naas Botha and Burger Geldenhuys represented the province on more occasions. He appeared in the Currie Cup final 9 times, of which 5 were won, and one drawn.

=== Test history ===
No.	Opposition	Result (SA 1st)	Position	Tries	Date	Venue
1.	World XV	45–24	Lock		27 August 1977	Loftus Versfeld, Pretoria
2.	South American Jaguars	24–9	Lock		26 April 1980	Wanderers Stadium, Johannesburg
3.	South American Jaguars	18–9	Lock		3 May 1980	Kings Park Stadium, Durban
4.	British Lions	26–22	Lock		31 May 1980	Newlands, Cape Town
5.	(British & Irish Lions) British Lions	26–19	Lock		14 June 1980	Free State Stadium, Bloemfontein
6.	(British & Irish Lions) British Lions	12–10	Lock		28 June 1980	Boet Erasmus Stadium, Port Elizabeth
7.	(British & Irish Lions) British Lions	13–17	Lock		12 July 1980	Loftus Versfeld, Pretoria
8.	South American Jaguars	22–13	Lock		18 October 1980	Wanderers Club, Montevideo
9.	South America Jaguars	30–16	Lock		25 October 1980	Prince of Wales Cricket Club, Santiago
10.	France	37–15	Lock		8 November 1980	Loftus Versfeld, Pretoria
11.	Ireland	23–15	Lock		30 May 1981	Newlands, Cape Town
12.	Ireland	12–10	Lock		6 June 1981	Kings Park Stadium, Durban
13.	New Zealand	9–14	Lock		15 August 1981	Lancaster Park, Christchurch
14.	New Zealand	24–12	Lock		29 August 1981	Athletic Park, Wellington
15.	New Zealand	22–25	Lock		12 September 1981	Eden Park, Auckland
16.	United States	38–7	Lock		20 September 1981	Owl Creek Polo ground, Glenville, New York
17.	South American Jaguars	50–18	Lock		27 March 1982	Loftus Versfeld, Pretoria
18.	South American Jaguars	12–21	Lock		3 April 1982	Free State Stadium, Bloemfontein
19.	South American Jaguars	32–15	Lock		20 October 1984	Loftus Versfeld, Pretoria
20.	South American Jaguars	21–13	Lock		27 October 1984	Newlands, Cape Town
21.	New Zealand Cavaliers	21–15	Lock		10 May 1986	Newlands, Cape Town
22.	New Zealand Cavaliers	18–19	Lock		17 May 1986	Kings Park Stadium, Durban
23.	New Zealand Cavaliers	33–18	Lock		24 May 1986	Loftus Versfeld, Pretoria
24.	New Zealand Cavaliers	24–10	Lock		31 May 1986	Ellis Park, Johannesburg

== Death ==
Moolman died after a short illness after suffering a stroke.

== Accolades ==
In 2000 he was inducted into the University of Pretoria Sport Hall of fame.

== See also ==
- List of South Africa national rugby union players – Springbok no. 498
