= 1980 France rugby union tour of South Africa =

Summary
P	W	D	L
Total
4	3	0	1
Test match
1	0	0	1
Opponent
P	W	D	L
South Africa
1	0	0	1

The 1980 France rugby union tour of South Africa was a series of matches played by the France national rugby union team in South Africa in November 1980. France lost their only international match against the South Africa national rugby union team.

== Results ==
Scores and results list France's points tally first.

	Date	Opponent	Location	Result	Score
Match 1	29 October	Natal	Durban	Won	27–16
Match 2	1 November	Western Province	Cape Town	Won	16–15
Match 3	4 November	SA Invitation XV	Bloemfontein	Won	32–27
Match 4	8 November	SOUTH AFRICA	Loftus Versfeld, Pretoria	Lost	15–37
