= Ray Mordt =

South Africa international rugby footballer (born 1957)

Personal information
- Full name: Raymond Herman Mordt
- Born: 15 February 1957 (age 69) Cape Town, South Africa

Playing information
- Height: 5 ft 11 in (180 cm)
- Weight: 14 st 9 lb (93 kg)

Rugby union
- Position: Wing
Club
Years	Team	Pld	T	G	FG	P
1981–83	Transvaal
1984–85	Northern Transvaal
	Total	0	0	0	0	0
Representative
Years	Team	Pld	T	G	FG	P
1978–80	Rhodesia
1980–84	South Africa	18	12			48

Rugby league
- Position: Wing
Club
Years	Team	Pld	T	G	FG	P
1986–87	Wigan	25	16	0	0	64

Coaching information
Club
Years	Team	Gms	W	D	L	W%
	Transvaal
- Education: Churchill High School
- Relatives: Nils Mordt (nephew)

Raymond Herman Mordt (/mɔːrt/ MORT); born 15 February 1957) is a Zimbabwean/South African rugby footballer who represented his country in rugby union before moving to English professional rugby league club, Wigan, with whom he won the Championship during the 1986–87 season. He is the uncle of England Sevens player Nils Mordt.

== Playing career ==
=== Rugby union ===
Mordt grew up and started playing rugby in Rhodesia (now Zimbabwe). He went to Churchill High School in Salisbury. He played Wing for the Springboks where he captained the team 3 times (twice as a substitute) from 1980 until 1984. He made his début against the South American Jaguars on 26 April 1980 at the Wanderers Stadium in Johannesburg. South Africa won the game 24–9. As a player, he may be best known for scoring 3 tries against the All Blacks in the famous "flour bomb" Test at Eden Park in Auckland, New Zealand on 12 September 1981. South Africa lost the game 25–22. Ray Mordt played a total of 18 tests (plus 7 tour games) for the Springboks, scoring 12 tries for a total of 48 points.

Mordt played Currie Cup rugby for Zimbabwe, Transvaal and Northern Transvaal and scored 35 career tries.

==== Test history ====
No.	Opposition	Result (SA 1st)	Position	Tries	Date	Venue
1.	South American Jaguars	24–9	Wing	1	26 April 1980	Wanderers Stadium, Johannesburg
2.	South American Jaguars	18–9	Wing		3 May 1980	Kings Park Stadium, Durban
3.	British Lions	26–22	Wing		31 May 1980	Newlands, Cape Town
4.	British Lions	26–19	Wing		14 June 1980	Free State Stadium, Bloemfontein
5.	British Lions	12–10	Wing		28 June 1980	Boet Erasmus Stadium, Port Elizabeth
6.	British Lions	13–17	Wing		12 July 1980	Loftus Versfeld, Pretoria
7.	South American Jaguars	22–13	Wing		18 October 1980	Wanderers Club, Montevideo
8.	South American Jaguars	30–16	Wing	2	25 October 1980	Prince of Wales Country Club, Santiago
9.	France	37–15	Wing		8 November 1980	Loftus Versfeld, Pretoria
10.	Ireland	12–10	Wing		6 June 1981	Kings Park Stadium, Durban
11.	New Zealand	9–14	Wing		15 August 1981	Lancaster Park, Christchurch
12.	New Zealand	24–12	Wing		29 August 1981	Athletic Park, Wellington
13.	New Zealand	22–25	Wing	3	12 September 1981	Eden Park, Auckland
14.	United States	38–7	Wing	3	20 September 1981	Owl Creek Polo ground, Glenville, New York
15.	South American Jaguars	50–18	Wing	2	27 March 1982	Loftus Versfeld, Pretoria
16.	South American Jaguars	12–21	Wing		3 April 1982	Free State Stadium, Bloemfontein
17.	South American Jaguars	32–15	Wing		20 October 1984	Loftus Versfeld, Pretoria
18.	South American Jaguars	22–13	Wing	1	27 October 1984	Newlands, Cape Town

==== Accolades ====
During his rugby union playing career Mordt was nominated for the SA Rugby Young Player of the Year in 1978 and SA Rugby Player of the Year in 1981, 1983 and 1984.

=== Rugby league ===
Mordt joined English rugby league club Wigan, making his début for them on the wing on 5 January 1986 against Swinton. he scored his first try for Wigan in the 44–6 victory over Hull F.C. at Central Park, Wigan on Sunday 2 March 1986. He played on the wing in Wigan's 11–8 victory over Hull Kingston Rovers in the 1985–86 John Player Special Trophy Final at Elland Road, Leeds on Saturday 11 January 1986, and was also part of the Championship-winning team during the 1986–87 season. He scored his last try for Wigan in the 54–2 victory over Oldham at Central Park, Wigan on Wednesday 8 April 1987, he played his last match for Wigan in the 24–6 victory over Oldham at Watersheddings, Oldham on Monday 20 April 1987, before retiring due to injury.

=== Baseball ===
Mordt also represented Rhodesia in the 1978 inter-provincial tournament in Durban, South Africa.

== Coaching career ==
After his active career Mordt has been engaged as a coach for the Springboks and other teams. In 1994 The International Rugby Board barred Mordt from joining South Africa's tour of Wales, Scotland and Ireland as a fitness instructor because of his time spent playing rugby league.

As a coach Mordt has won the Currie Cup in 1994, coaching Transvaal. He was also a crucial cog in the 1995 Rugby World Cup-winning coaching set-up of Kitch Christie.

== See also ==
- List of South Africa national rugby union players – Springbok no. 501
