= Sudamérica XV =

South American representative rugby union team

- Unions: Sudamérica Rugby
- Founded: 1980; 46 years ago
- Region: South America
- Coach: (Argentina) Daniel Hourcade
Team kit

First match
- Boland Cavaliers 12–42 Sudamérica XV (12 April 1980)

Largest win
- NE Cape 3–72 Sudamérica XV (17 March 1982)

Largest test win
- South Africa 12–21 Sudamérica XV (3 April 1982)

Largest test defeat
- Argentina 78–15 Sudamérica XV (6 August 2011)

The Sudamérica XV (sometimes nicknamed the Jaguars) is a rugby union team made up from the national rugby sides in the Sudamérica Rugby (formerly CONSUR) rugby federation.

The squad was first formed in 1980 to compete against South African teams, in defiance of the anti-apartheid sporting boycott. Over the eight test matches played, seven of them were won by the Springboks and only one was won by the Jaguars. This single victory came at Bloemfontein in 1982.

In 2011, a new Sudamérica XV was formed to face the Argentine side before they trip to New Zealand to play the 2011 Rugby World Cup.

== History ==
=== First team: the 1980s ===
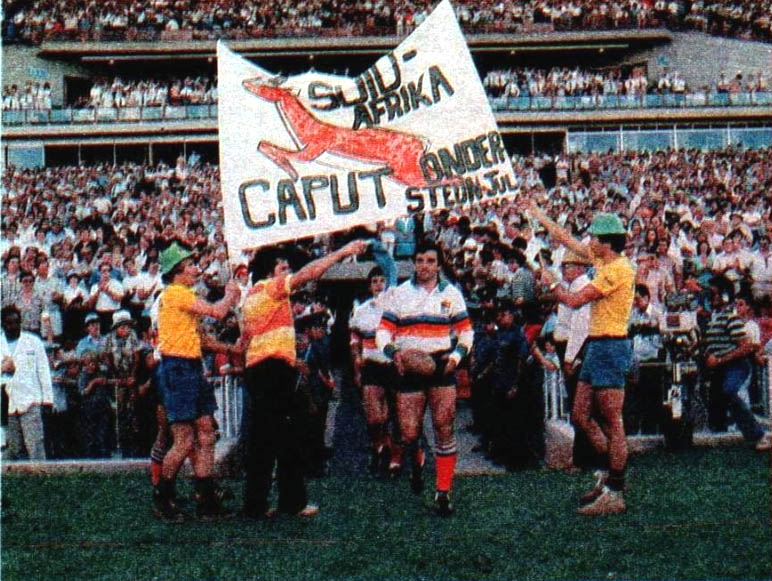
The South American side entering the field with Hugo Porta leading the team in 1980

The side was formed in 1980 after an invitation from the SARU to the Argentine Rugby Union (UAR) to play a series of games there as a way of counteracting its sporting isolation which was due to the country's apartheid policies.

The team that toured was mainly made up of Argentina players and included a few Uruguayan, Chilean, Paraguayan, Brazilian and even Spanish players. The team was named "Sudamérica XV", wearing a white jersey with blue, red and gold stripes. The badge included a puma, a condor, a lapwing and a jaguar, representing Argentina, Chile, Uruguay and Paraguay respectively. Rodolfo O'Reilly was appointed as coach.

Boys from other countries knew that (South America XV) was a facade, and, although they played some matches in the tour, it were the Pumas who played the tests

— Rodolfo O'Reilly remembering his days as coach of South American Jaguars in an interview with Argentine newspaper La Gazeta.

The Jaguars was a 'shadow' Argentine national team, not officially recognised by the UAR as a stratagem to elude the prohibition of the Argentine government that since the early 1970s forbade any official relationship between any Argentine sport federation and South African and Rhodesian ones, due to the apartheid politics of those countries. This ostracism had started in 1971 when the Argentine government forbade the Pumas to play a match in Rhodesia during the tour in South Africa.

In March 1973, the Argentine government and the UAR had a great conflict: the government contested to UAR the permit given to San Isidro Club to visit South Africa, and forced the federal committee of UAR to resign. A new committee was elected on 24 April 1973. In November the government also forbade all visits to South Africa by any Argentine team and any visit of a South African team into Argentina. This ban remained until 1991.

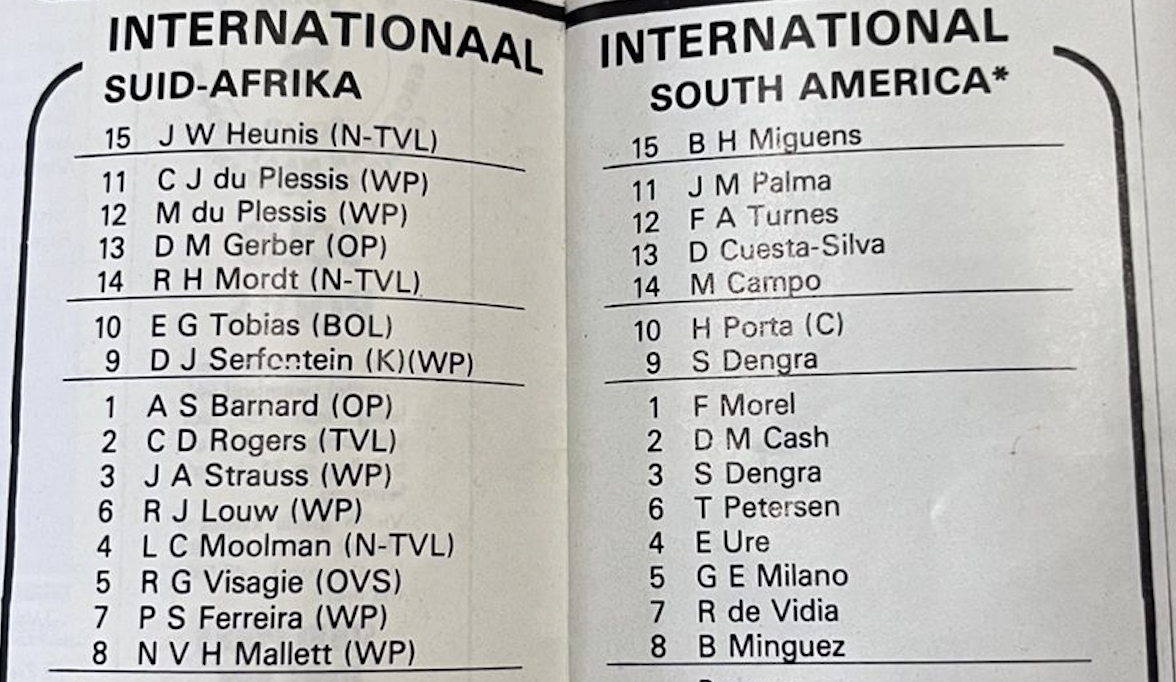
Team listing for the rugby match between South Africa and "South America" on 20 October 1984 in Pretoria

The only victory of Sudamérica XV in a test match came in 1982, when they beat South Africa 21–12, with all points scored by captain Hugo Porta. It also became the first win of an Argentine side over South Africa so all the players on the field were from that country.

In 1984 the Argentine Government forced the UAR to forbid the use of any Argentine emblem by the players. As a result, the body decided not to send any representative to South Africa, declining the invitation. Nevertheless, the players accepted the invitation, being part of the South American Jaguars that toured that year. That tour was the last, with the Jaguars being dissolved.

=== Rebirth ===
In 2011, the side played one match against Argentina, in San Juan as part of their 2011 Rugby World Cup warm-ups. Argentina won 78–15.

The team reassembled in 2013, and played England on 2 June 2013 at Estadio Charrúa in Montevideo as a warm-up match for the English before playing 2 tests against Argentina.

The team competed at the 2015 Urucup, with players from the Argentine Pladar Litoral plus three guests from Colombia, Paraguay and Venezuela.

In November 2018, Sudamérica XV toured Chile and Paraguay to play the respective national teams. In August 2019, the team played Uruguay, which beat them 24–20.

After a long hiatus of over four years, Sudamérica XV was reassembled in 2023 to play vs Georgian professional team Black Lion, then Rugby Europe Super Cup champion, at Estadio Charrúa. Sudamérica XV defeated the Lions 28–24. The regional side was formed by players from Argentina, Brazil, Chile, Colombia, and Uruguay.

== Team image ==
=== Badge ===
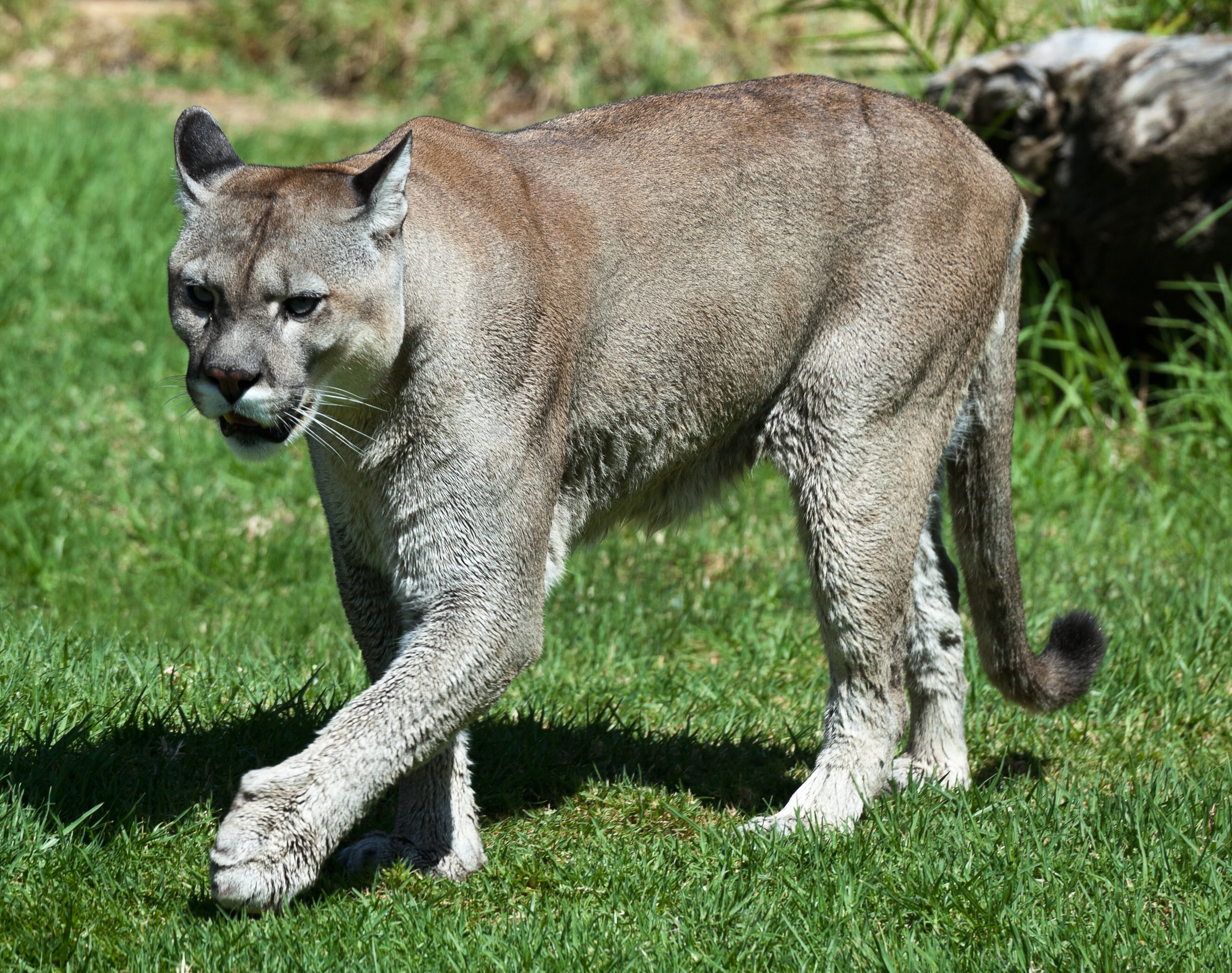
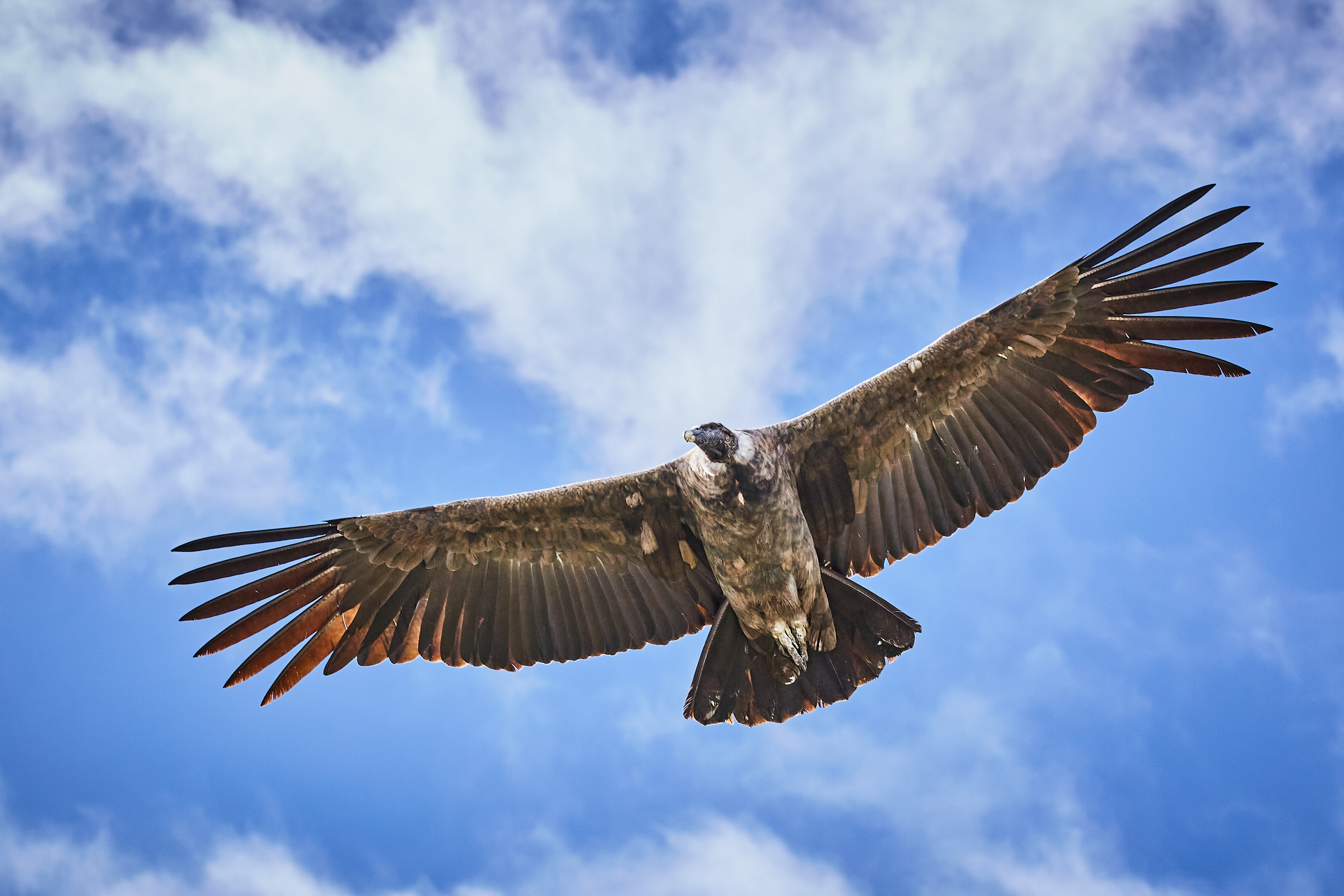
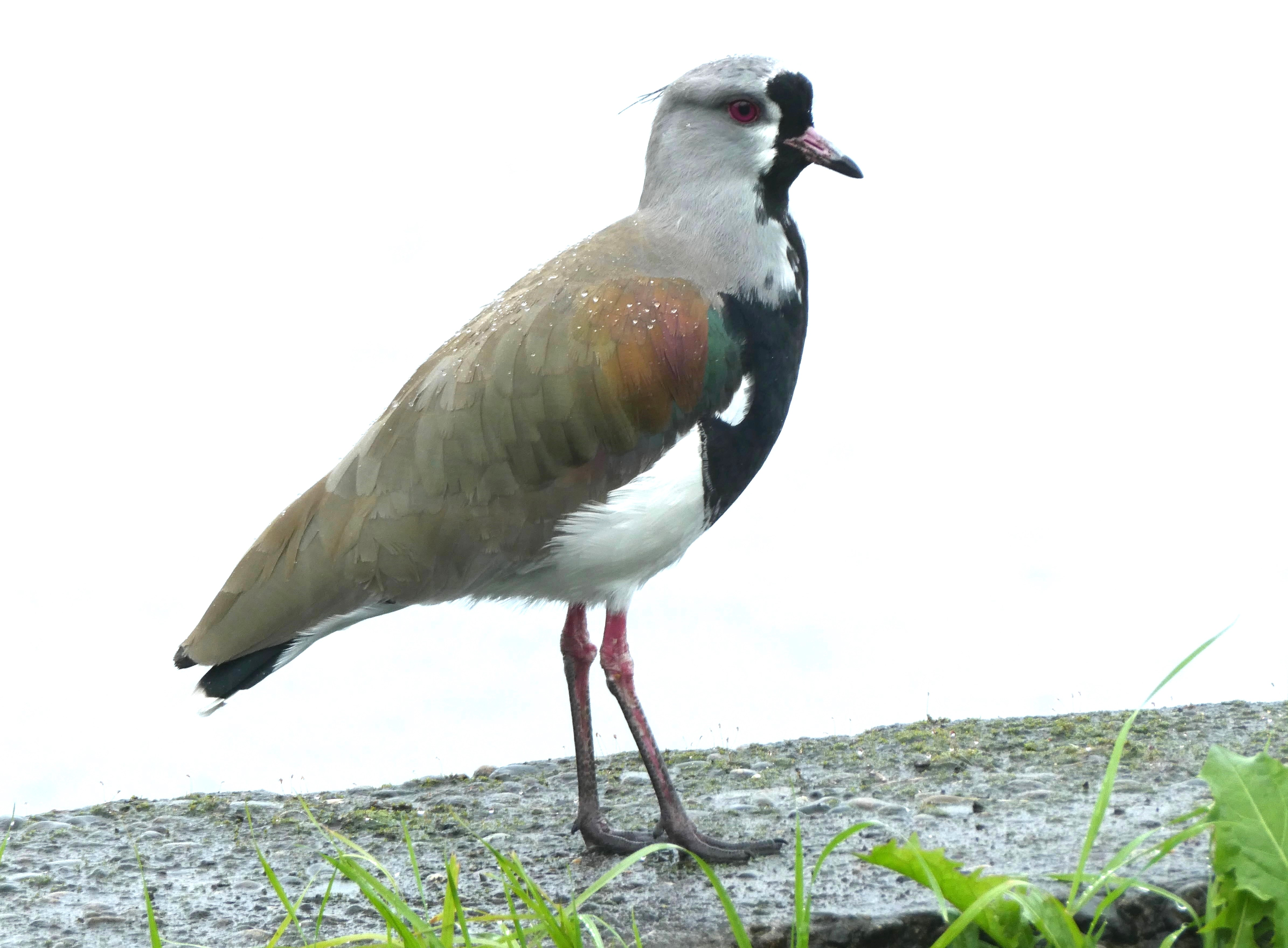
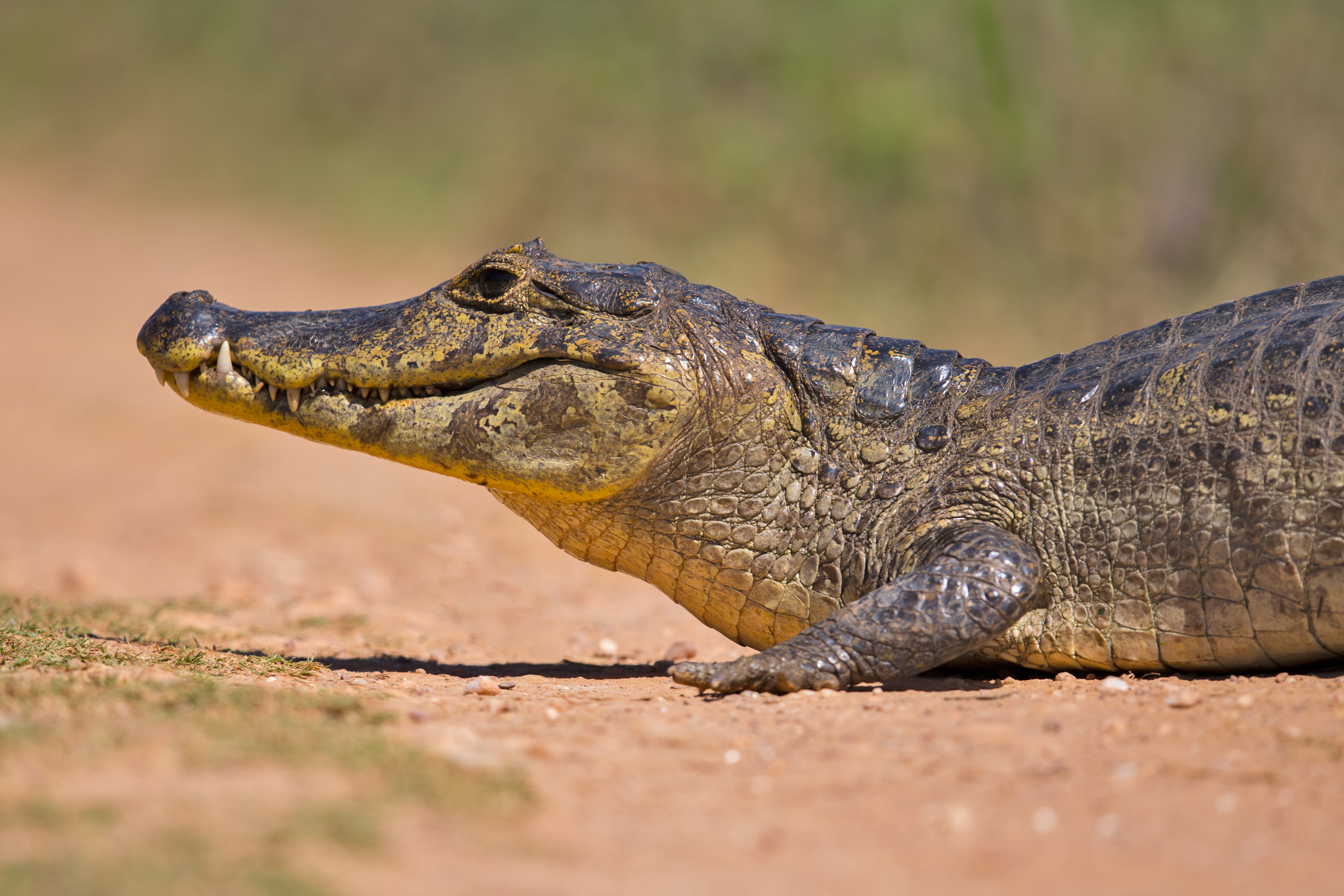
Fltr (above): Puma, condor; (below) tero, and yaguareté, the animals depicted on the badge

The team's badge includes four animal figures, each of them representing a symbol of their respective countries, they are puma (Argentina), condor (Chile), tero (Uruguay), and yacare (Paraguay).

These animals have also been the symbols (and nicknames) of the four rugby national teams. In the case of Chile, the condor is also the national emblem of the country, appearing in the national coat of arms promulgated in 1832.

=== Kit history ===
1980–84, 2023–	2013–15	2018–19

== Test results ==
Summarised list of matches played by the South American side (only considered "tests" are included):

Date	Venue	City	Rival	Res.	Score	Character	Ref.
26 April 1980	Wanderers Stadium	Johannesburg	South Africa	L	9–24	Tour to South Africa	
3 May 1980	Kings Park Stadium	Durban	South Africa	L	9–18	Tour to South Africa	
18 October 1980	Wanderers Club	Montevideo	South Africa	L	13–22	Tour to South America	
25 October 1980	Prince of Wales C.C.	Santiago	South Africa	L	16–30	Tour to South America	
27 March 1982	Loftus Versfeld	Pretoria	South Africa	L	18–50	Tour to South Africa	
3 April 1982	Free State	Bloemfontein	South Africa	W	21–12	Tour to South Africa	
20 October 1984	Loftus Versfeld	Pretoria	South Africa	L	15–32	Tour to South Africa	
27 October 1984	Newlands	Cape Town	South Africa	L	13–22	Tour to South Africa	
6 August 2011	Bicentenario	San Juan	Argentina	L	15–78	VISA Cup	
2 June 2013	Estadio Charrúa	Montevideo	England	L	21–41	Tour to Argentina	
31 May 2014	Ateneo Inmaculada	Santo Tomé	Argentina	L	0–40	Copa Banco Santa Fe	
8 March 2015	Estadio Charrúa	Montevideo	Uruguay B	W	21–18	Urucup (Note: It was a friendly competition contested by several South American national teams, organised by Uruguayan Rugby Union.)	
11 March 2015	Estadio Charrúa	Montevideo	Argentina U-20	L	20–29	Urucup	
14 March 2015	Estadio Charrúa	Montevideo	Uruguay U-20	W	43–16	Urucup	
10 November 2018	Municipal Stadium	La Pintana	Chile	W	38–21	Tour to South America	
17 November 2018	Héroes de Curupaytí	Asunción	Paraguay	W	73–22	Tour to South America	
24 August 2019	Estadio Charrúa	Montevideo	Uruguay	L	20–24	Warm-up match (Note: Served as preparation for the 2019 World Cup.)	
28 April 2023	Estadio Charrúa	Montevideo	(Georgia (country)) Black Lion	W	28–24	Tour to South America	
