= Hennie Bekker (rugby union) =

South African rugby union footballer and coach

- Born: Hendrik Johnnes Bekker; 12 September 1952 (age 74) Nuwerus, Western Cape, South Africa
- Height: 2.01 m (6 ft 7 in)
- Weight: 120 kg (265 lb)
- School: JG Meiring High School, Goodwood, Cape Town
- University: Stellenbosch University

Rugby union career
- Position: Lock
Amateur team(s)
Years	Team	Apps	(Points)
1973	Paarl Teachers Training College		
1979–1985	Stellenbosch University (Maties)		
1977–1978	Free State Defence		
Provincial / State sides
Years	Team	Apps	(Points)
1973	Boland	8	(50)
1979–1985	Western Province	108	(176)
1977–1978	Free State	27	(60)
International career
Years	Team	Apps	(Points)
1981	South Africa	2	(4)
Coaching career
- Years: Team
- 1990: Western Province

Hendrik Johannes Bekker (born 12 September 1952 in Nuwerus, Western Cape, South Africa is a former South African rugby union player.

== Early life and career ==
Bekker was born in the small town of Nuwerus in the North-western region of the Western Cape, but spent most of his school years in Goodwood, Cape Town where he attended JG Meiring High School and represented the school's first team for three years. In 1970 he was selected to represent the Western Province schools team at the annual Craven Week tournament held in Salisbury, Rhodesia (now Harare, Zimbabwe).

== Playing career ==
=== Provincial career ===
After school, Bekker enrolled at Paarl Teachers Training College and made his provincial debut for Boland on 24 May 1973 against a touring London Counties team. In 1974 Bekker moved to Stellenbosch University to further his studies and joined the university's rugby club, Maties. He made his debut for Western Province on 10 August 1974 against Transvaal and scored his first try for Western Province.

Two years later, in 1977 Bekker received his call up for military service and he had to join the Defence Force in Bloemfontein. During his time in Bloemfontein he played 27 matches for the Free State. Bekker returned to Stellenbosch in 1979 and again joined the Maties. He also returned to the Western Province team and represented the province until he retired from playing at the end of 1985. During the 1980s Bekker was part of the Western Province team that won the Currie Cup in 1982, 1983, 1984 and 1985. At the time of his retirement, Bekker scored 44 tries for Western Province, which was the Western Province try scoring record.

=== International career ===
Bekker made his test debut for the Springboks during the 1981 tour of New Zealand in the first test on 15 August 1981 at Lancaster Park, Christchurch, New Zealand. He was not selected for the second test but returned to the side for the third test match against New Zealand at Eden Park, Auckland. Bekker played a further 8 matches on tour for the Springboks, scoring three tries.

=== Test history ===
No.	Opposition	Result (SA 1st)	Position	Tries	Date	Venue
1.	New Zealand	9–14	Lock	1	15 August 1981	Lancaster Park, Christchurch
2.	New Zealand	22–25	Lock		12 September 1981	Eden Park, Auckland

== Accolades ==
Bekker was named the SA Rugby Player of the Year for 1983. The other nominees for the award in 1983 were Divan Serfontein, Carel du Plessis, Liaan Kirkham and Ray Mordt.

== Coaching ==
On 1 October 1985, Bekker was appointed assistant–organiser for coaching at the South African Rugby Board. From 1986 to 1989 he acted as forward–coach for Western Province and in 1990 he replaced Dawie Snyman as head coach of Western Province.

== Personal ==
Bekker is the father of Andries Bekker, a former Western Province, Stormers and Springbok Rugby player. Andries is currently playing for Kobelco Steelers in the Japanese Top League.

== See also ==
- List of South Africa national rugby union players – Springbok no. 527
