= Theuns Stofberg =

South African rugby union player

- Born: Marthinus Theunis Steyn Stofberg; 6 June 1955 Villiers, South Africa
- Died: 23 August 2023 (aged 68) Stellenbosch, South Africa
- Height: 6 ft 4 in (1.93 m)
- Weight: 239 lb (108 kg; 17 st 1 lb)

Rugby union career
- Position(s): Flanker, Lock
Amateur team(s)
Years	Team	Apps	(Points)
1973-1975	Shimlas		
Provincial / State sides
Years	Team	Apps	(Points)
1976	Orange Free State		
1980	Northern Transvaal		
1983	Western Province		
International career
Years	Team	Apps	(Points)
1976–1984	South Africa	21	(30)

Marthinus Theunis Steyn 'Theuns' Stofberg (6 June 1955 – 23 August 2023) He is remembered for his speed and his size, both remarkable for a flank at that time.

== Early life and career ==
Marthinus Theunis Steyn Stofberg, named after the 6th State President of the Orange Free State, Martinus Theunis Steyn, was born in Villiers, Free State on 6 June 1955. He attended school at Grey College in Bloemfontein, one of the strongholds in South African rugby. He started his provincial career playing for Orange Free State while he was still studying at the University of the Free State. When he was called up for his conscription, he was moved to Pretoria where he started playing for Northern Transvaal, currently called the Blue Bulls. It was during this time that he went from strength to strength cementing his place in the national side as flanker.

== Test career ==
Stofberg played his first test on the 14 August 1976 against New Zealand at Free State Stadium, Bloemfontein at the age of 21. The Springboks lost the test 9-15.

Stofberg played in 21 tests and scored 6 tries during this time. His first test as captain was against the South American Jaguars on the 18 October 1980 in Montevideo where the Springboks won 22-13. His biggest test as a captain was leading the Springbok side, after the regular captain Wynand Claassen was injured, in the first test of the infamous 1981 Springbok Tour of New Zealand. The tour was disrupted by protesters during the matches and is now seen as one of the most important tours in rugby history. Stofberg did not play in the last of the three test series, which was stopped momentarily due to a light airplane throwing flour bombs, due to a knee injury that would ultimately end his career.

Stofberg left Northern Transvaal in 1982 and moved to their arch-rivals Western Province Rugby Union where he settled and opened a physiotherapy practice. Stofberg captained his last two international tests against England in 1984, winning both and scoring a try in the second test. After yet another series setback due a knee injury he retired from rugby in 1984 at the age of 29. He is the only player in history to have won the Currie Cup with three different teams. He won titles with Free State (1976), Northern Transvaal (1979 and 1980) and Western Province (1982 and 1983). In total he played 7 finals, winning 4 ('76, '80, '82 & '83) and drawing one (1980).

=== Test history ===
No.	Opposition	Result (SA 1st)	Position	Tries	Date	Venue
1.	New Zealand	9–15	Flank		14 August 1976	Free State Stadium, Bloemfontein
2.	New Zealand	15–10	Flank		4 September 1976	Newlands, Cape Town
3.	World XV	45–24	Flank	2	27 August 1977	Loftus Versfeld, Pretoria
4.	South American Jaguars	24–9	Flank		26 April 1980	Wanderers Stadium, Johannesburg
5.	South American Jaguars	18–9	Flank		3 May 1980	Kings Park Stadium, Durban
6.	British Lions	26–22	Flank		31 May 1980	Newlands, Cape Town
7.	(British & Irish Lions) British Lions	26–19	Flank	1	14 June 1980	Free State Stadium, Bloemfontein
8.	(British & Irish Lions) British Lions	12–10	Flank		28 June 1980	Boet Erasmus Stadium, Port Elizabeth
9.	(British & Irish Lions) British Lions	13–17	Flank	1	12 July 1980	Loftus Versfeld, Pretoria
10.	South American Jaguars	22–13	Flank (c)	1	18 October 1980	Wanderers Club, Montevideo
11.	South American Jaguars	30–16	Flank		25 October 1980	Prince of Wales Country Club, Santiago
12.	France	37–15	Flank	1	8 November 1980	Loftus Versfeld, Pretoria
13.	Ireland	23–15	Flank		30 May 1981	Newlands, Cape Town
14.	Ireland	12–10	Flank		6 June 1981	Kings Park Stadium, Durban
15.	New Zealand	9–14	Flank (c)		15 August 1981	Lancaster Park, Christchurch
16.	New Zealand	24–12	Flank		29 August 1981	Athletic Park, Wellington
17.	United States	38–7	Flank		20 September 1981	Owl Creek Polo ground, Glenville, New York
18.	South American Jaguars	50–18	Lock		27 March 1982	Loftus Versfeld, Pretoria
19.	South American Jaguars	12–21	Lock		3 April 1982	Free State Stadium, Bloemfontein
20.	England	33–15	Flank (c)		2 June 1984	Boet Erasmus Stadium, Port Elizabeth
21.	England	35–9	Flank (c)		9 June 1984	Ellis Park Stadium, Johannesburg

== Personal life ==
Stofberg lived in Stellenbosch where he had a physiotherapy practice until 2008, before starting a business to take tour groups abroad. He fell ill while watching a test against England and was diagnosed with eosinophilic granulomatosis with polyangiitis, causing him to stop practising as a physiotherapist.

=== Death ===
Theuns Stofberg died in a traffic collision on 23 August 2023, at the age of 68.

== See also ==
- List of South Africa national rugby union players – Springbok no. 489

Sporting positions
Preceded by Morne du Plessis	Springbok Captain; 1980, 1981, 1984	Succeeded by Wynand Claassen
