= Shaun Povey =

South African rugby union player

- Born: Shaun Albert Povey; 9 August 1954 Port Elizabeth, South Africa
- Height: 1.84 m (6 ft 0 in)
- Weight: 94 kg (207 lb)
- School: Grey High School, Port Elizabeth
- University: University of Port Elizabeth, Stellenbosch University

Rugby union career
- Position: Hooker
Amateur team(s)
Years	Team	Apps	(Points)
1973	UPE		
1974–1984	Maties		
1985–1987	Gardens–Tech RFC		
Provincial / State sides
Years	Team	Apps	(Points)
1977–1987	Western Province	103	(20)
International career
Years	Team	Apps	(Points)
1981	South Africa (tour)	2	(0)

Shaun Albert Povey (born 9 August 1954) is a former South African rugby union player.

== Playing career ==
Povey represented the Eastern Province Schools team at the 1972 annual Craven Week tournament in Potchefstroom. After school, Povey did his national service in Oudtshoorn and was selected to represent the South Western Districts under–20 side. In 1973, he spent the year at the University of Port Elizabeth, after which he moved to Stellenbosch University. He made his provincial debut for Western Province in 1977 and represented Western Province in their five winning Currie Cup finals, in 1982, 1983, 1984, 1985 and 1986.

Povey toured with the Springboks to New Zealand and the USA in 1981 as a replacement for Willie Kahts. He did not play in any test matches on tour, but played in two tour matches for the Springboks.

== See also ==
- List of South Africa national rugby union players – Springbok no. 531
