= Divan Serfontein =

South African rugby union footballer

- Born: David Jacobus Serfontein; 3 August 1954 (age 72) Krugersdorp, South Africa
- Height: 1.67 m (5 ft 6 in)
- Weight: 70 kg (150 lb)
- School: Vanderbijlpark High School
- University: Stellenbosch University
- Occupation: Orthopedic surgeon

Rugby union career
- Position: Scrumhalf
Provincial / State sides
Years	Team	Apps	(Points)
1976–1984	Western Province	100	(86)
International career
Years	Team	Apps	(Points)
1980–1984	South Africa	19	(12)

David Jacobus 'Divan' Serfontein (born 3 August 1954 in Krugersdorp, South Africa) is a former Springbok rugby union player.

== Playing career ==
=== Provincial career ===
Serfontein started his rugby career in 1974 at Maties where he was selected for the club's under-20 age group team. He was soon afterwards selected for the Western Province under-20 team and in his first match he played alongside the future South African cricketer, Peter Kirsten. In 1976 Serfontein made his provincial first team debut for Western Province against the touring All Blacks side of Andy Leslie. Western Province won this match 12–11.

At the start of the 1981 rugby season, Serfontein was appointed as Western Province captain. He went on to captain his province 51 times and also led his team to three consecutive Currie Cup titles, in 1982, 1983 and 1984.

=== International career ===
Serfontein made his test debut for the Springboks on 31 May 1980 at his home ground, Newlands in Cape Town against the touring British and Irish Lions team, captained by Bill Beaumont. He also scored his first test try in this match. The test series against the Lions, was followed with tests against the South American Jaguars, France, Ireland, New Zealand ( the so-called Rebel Tour) and England.

Serfontein was selected as captain for the two test matches against the touring South American Jaguars in October 1984 and in doing so became the 39th Springbok test captain. Serfontein retired from rugby union at the end of the 1984 season, having played 100 matches for Western Province and 19 consecutive test matches for the Springboks. He also scored 3 test tries.

=== Test history ===
No.	Opposition	Result (SA 1st)	Position	Tries	Date	Venue
1.	British Lions	26–22	Scrumhalf	1	31 May 1980	Newlands, Cape Town
2.	(British & Irish Lions) British Lions	26–19	Scrumhalf		14 June 1980	Free State Stadium, Bloemfontein
3.	(British & Irish Lions) British Lions	12–10	Scrumhalf		28 June 1980	Boet Erasmus Stadium, Port Elizabeth
4.	(British & Irish Lions) British Lions	13–17	Scrumhalf		12 July 1980	Loftus Versfeld, Pretoria
5.	South American Jaguars	22–13	Scrumhalf		18 October 1980	Wanderers Club, Montevideo
6.	South American Jaguars	30–16	Scrumhalf		25 October 1980	Prince of Wales Country Club, Santiago
7.	France	37–15	Scrumhalf	1	8 November 1980	Loftus Versfeld, Pretoria
8.	Ireland	23–15	Scrumhalf		30 May 1981	Newlands, Cape Town
9.	Ireland	12–10	Scrumhalf		6 June 1981	Kings Park Stadium, Durban
10.	New Zealand	9–14	Scrumhalf		15 August 1981	Lancaster Park, Christchurch
11.	New Zealand	24–12	Scrumhalf		29 August 1981	Athletic Park, Wellington
12.	New Zealand	22–25	Scrumhalf		12 September 1981	Eden Park, Auckland
13.	United States	38–7	Scrumhalf		20 September 1981	Owl Creek Polo ground, Glenville, New York
14.	South American Jaguars	50–18	Scrumhalf		27 March 1982	Loftus Versfeld, Pretoria
15.	South American Jaguars	12–21	Scrumhalf		3 April 1982	Free State Stadium, Bloemfontein
16.	England	33–15	Scrumhalf		2 June 1984	Boet Erasmus Stadium, Port Elizabeth
17.	England	35–9	Scrumhalf		9 June 1984	Ellis Park Stadium, Johannesburg
18.	South American Jaguars	32–15	Scrumhalf (c)	1	20 October 1984	Loftus Versfeld Stadium, Pretoria
19.	South American Jaguars	22–13	Scrumhalf (c)		27 October 1984	Newlands, Cape Town

== Accolades ==
Serfontein was named the SA Rugby Player of the Year for 1982.

== See also ==
- List of South Africa national rugby union players – Springbok no. 508

Sporting positions
Preceded by Wynand Claassen	Springbok Captain; 1984	Succeeded by Naas Botha
