= Gawie Visagie =

South African rugby union footballer (1955–2014)

- Born: Gabriël Pieter Visagie; 31 March 1955 Vereeniging, South Africa
- Died: 19 November 2014 (aged 59) Durban, South Africa
- Height: 1.81 m (5 ft 11 in)
- Weight: 82 kg (181 lb)
- School: HTS Kimberley
- Notable relative(s): Piet Visagie (brother), Janet Visagie (Wife), Jayde Visagie (Daughter), Morne Visagie (Son)

Rugby union career
- Position(s): Scrumhalf, Fly-half, Centre
Provincial / State sides
Years	Team	Apps	(Points)
1977–1980	Griqualand West	39	
1981–1985	Natal	42	
International career
Years	Team	Apps	(Points)
1981	South Africa (tour)	3	(8)

Gabriël Pieter 'Gawie' Visagie (31 March 1955 – 19 November 2014) was a South African rugby union footballer.

== Playing career ==
Visagie was born in Vereeniging, Gauteng, but finished his schooling in Kimberley in the Northern Cape at HTS Kimberley and was selected to represent Griqualand West at the annual Craven Week tournament in 1973. In 1974 he moved to Pretoria for his two years of National service and played for the Northern Transvaal under–20 team. In 1976 he was back in the Northern Cape to work at the Associated Manganese Mines of South Africa Limited (AMMOSAL), now called Assmang Proprietary Limited. Visagie made his Provincial debut for Griqualand West in 1977 and played 39 games for the union.

In 1981 Visagie re-located to Natal and played for Natal until 1985. He was also part of the team that unexpectedly reaches the Currie Cup Final in 1984. Visagie toured with the Springboks to New Zealand in 1981. He did not play in any test matches for the Springboks, but played in three tour matches, scoring two tries.

== Accolades ==
Visagie, along with Darius Botha, Willie du Plessis, Doug Jeffrey and Andre Markgraaff, was named one of the five SA Rugby Young players of the year for 1979.

== Death ==
Visagie died on 19 November 2014 after a long battle with cancer.

== See also ==
- List of South Africa national rugby union players – Springbok no. 530
