= Mzanzi Challenge =

Rugby union competition in South Africa

Mzansi Challenge
- Current season, competition or edition: 2023 Mzanzi Challenge
- Sport: Rugby union
- Founded: 2023
- First season: 2023
- Folded: 2023
- No. of teams: 10
- Country: South Africa, Namibia, Kenya, United States, Zimbabwe
- Last champion: Valke
- Most titles: Valke (1)

The 2023 Currie Cup First Division ran concurrently with the Mzansi Challenge, which, in addition to the six South African sides, featured four additional international sides; the Welwitschias from Namibia, the Zimbabwe Goshawks, the Simbas from Kenya and the San Clemente Rhinos from the USA. Initially, the Tel Aviv Heat from Israel were due to play. However, after pressure from the South African BDS, SARU withdrew their invitation to the Heat, who were replaced by the Rhinos.

The SA Cup became the long term replacement for the Mzansi Challenge.

== Standings - Mzansi Challenge ==
2023 Mzansi Challenge standings
Pos	Team	Pld	W	D	L	PF	PA	PD	TF	TA	TB	LB	Pts	Qualification
1	Valke	9	8	0	1	323	208	+115	48	29	9	0	41	Semifinals
2	SWD Eagles	9	8	0	1	223	174	+49	31	23	8	0	40	Semifinals
3	Boland Cavaliers	9	7	0	2	232	146	+86	34	17	8	0	36	Semifinals
4	Leopards	9	5	0	4	190	170	+20	24	23	6	0	26	Semifinals
5	Eastern Province Elephants	9	5	0	4	191	211	−20	23	28	5	0	25	
6	San Clemente Rhinos	9	4	0	5	209	226	−17	30	34	8	0	24	
7	Welwitschias	9	3	0	6	241	274	−33	32	35	5	0	17	
8	Simbas	9	2	0	7	135	119	+16	20	17	4	0	12	
9	Border Bulldogs	9	2	0	7	197	352	−155	27	51	4	0	12	
10	Zimbabwe Goshawks	9	1	0	8	106	167	−61	14	26	4	0	8	

Updated to match(es) played on 17 June 2023. Source: springboks.rugby
Rules for classification: Tournament points in the standings were awarded to teams as follows:
- 4 points for a win.
- 2 points for a draw.
- 1 bonus point for a loss in a match by seven points or under.
- 1 bonus point for scoring four tries or more.
Teams were ranked in the standings firstly by tournament points then by: (a) points difference from all matches (points scored less points conceded); (b) tries difference from all matches (tries scored less tries conceded); (c) points difference from the matches between the tied teams; (d) points scored in all matches; (e) tries scored in all matches; and, if needed, (f) a coin toss.

== Round 1 ==
25 March 2023

Border Bulldogs	26–21	Welwitschias

Police Park, East London

25 March 2023

Leopards	Cancelled	Zimbabwe Goshawks

Olen Park, Potchefstroom

25 March 2023

SWD Eagles	36–23	Eastern Province

Riverville Stadium, Riversdale

== Round 2 ==
1 April 2023

Simbas	Cancelled	Boland Cavaliers

Hamiltons Rugby Club, Cape Town

1 April 2023

Eastern Province Elephants	Cancelled	Zimbabwe Goshawks

Adcock Stadium, Gqeberha

1 April 2023

Valke	64–17	Border Bulldogs

Barnard Stadium, Kempton Park

1 April 2023

Welwitschias	22–31	SWD Eagles

Hage Geingob Rugby Stadium, Windhoek

== Round 3 ==
8 April 2023

Boland Cavaliers	Cancelled	Zimbabwe Goshawks

Lyle Street Sportsgound, Ceres

8 April 2023

Leopards	Cancelled	Simbas

Olen Park, Potchefstroom

8 April 2023

SWD Eagles	28–26	San Clemente Rhinos

Outeniqua Park, George

8 April 2023

Welwitschias	24–48	Valke

Hage Geingob Rugby Stadium, Windhoek

== Round 4 ==
15 April 2023

SWD Eagles	33-24	Valke

Outeniqua Park, George

15 April 2023

San Clemente Rhinos	33-22	Simbas

Charles Morkel Stadium, Strand

15 April 2023

Eastern Province	24–20	Leopards

De Wet Stadium, Despatch

15 April 2023

Zimbabwe Goshawks	26–31	Welwitschias

Harare Sports Club, Harare

== Round 5 ==
22 April 2023

Valke	31-22	Boland Cavaliers

Barnard Stadium, Kempton Park

22 April 2023

Leopards	25-33	SWD Eagles

Charles Morkel Stadium, Strand

22 April 2023

Border Bulldogs	27–43	Eastern Province

Police Park, East London

22 April 2023

Welwitschias	24–25	San Clemente Rhinos

Hage Geingob Rugby Stadium, Windhoek

== Round 6 ==
28 April 2023

SWD Eagles	47-25	Border Bulldogs

Outeniqua Park, George

29 April 2023

San Clemente Rhinos	31-25	Zimbabwe Goshawks

Charles Morkel Stadium, Strand

29 April 2023

Boland Cavaliers	12–3	Leopards

Glaskasteel Fields, Bredasdorp

29 April 2023

Eastern Province	18–7	Simbas

Port Alfred High School, Port Alfred

== Round 7 ==
6 May 2023

Simbas	30-26	Border Bulldogs

CPUT Sports Stadium, Cape Town

6 May 2023

San Clemente Rhinos	36-45	Boland Cavaliers

Charles Morkel Stadium, Strand

6 May 2023

Zimbabwe Goshawks	48–57	Valke

Harare Sports Club, Harare

6 May 2023

Welwitschias	20–23	Leopards

Jan Wilken Stadium, Walvis Bay

== Round 8 ==
13 May 2023

San Clemente Rhinos	22-41	Leopards

Charles Morkel Stadium, Strand

13 May 2023

Eastern Province	25-18	Boland Cavaliers

De Wet Stadium, Despatch

13 May 2023

Welwitschias	35–28	Simbas

Hage Geingob Rugby Stadium, Windhoek

13 May 2023

Zimbabwe Goshawks	cancelled	Border Bulldogs

Harare Sports Club, Harare

== Round 9 ==
20 May 2023

Simbas	48-7	Zimbabwe Goshawks

Nakuru Rugby Club, Nakuru

20 May 2023

Boland Cavaliers	29-15	SWD Eagles

Pella Park, Porterville

20 May 2023

Valke	56–29	Eastern Province

Barnard Stadium, Kempton Park

20 May 2023

Border Bulldogs	41-36	San Clemente Rhinos

Sisa Dukashe Stadium, Mdantsane

== Round 10 ==
27 May 2023

San Clemente Rhinos	cancelled	Eastern Province

N/A

27 May 2023

Simbas	cancelled	Valke

Barnard Stadium, Kempton Park

27 May 2023

Border Bulldogs	16–43	Leopards

Police Park, East London

27 May 2023

Zimbabwe Goshawks	cancelled	SWD Eagles

Harare Sports Club, Harare

27 May 2023

Welwitschias	17-38	Boland Cavaliers

Hage Geingob Rugby Stadium, Windhoek

== Round 11 ==
3 June 2023

Simbas	cancelled	SWD Eagles

RFUEA Ground, Nairobi

3 June 2023

Leopards	35-43	Valke

Olen Park, Potchefstroom

3 June 2023

Border Bulldogs	19–68	Boland Cavaliers

Sisa Dukashe Stadium, Mdantsane

3 June 2023

Welwitschias	47-29	Eastern Province

Hage Geingob Rugby Stadium, Windhoek

== Play-offs ==
On the eve of the playoffs, South Western Districts Eagles threatened to pull out of their semifinal, disputing the decision to award the Valke points after they refused to play against the San Clemente Rhinos.

=== Semifinals ===
10 June 2023	Valke	57–30	Leopards	Barnard Stadium
15:00

10 June 2023	SWD Eagles	37–20	Boland Cavaliers	Outeniqua Park
15:00

=== Final ===
17 June 2023	Valke	55–38	SWD Eagles	Barnard Stadium
12.30	Try: Tshabalala; Elias; Wellman; Stamper; Ntunja; Arendse; Con: Fortune (5); Pen: Fortune (5)		Try: Syster (2); Leonard; Stander; Ntsane; Con: Weich (3); Syster (1)

== See also ==
- Rugby union in South Africa
- Currie Cup
- SA Cup
