= Wynand Claassen =

South African rugby union player

- Born: Wynand Claassen; 16 January 1951 (age 75) Schweizer-Reneke
- School: Middelburg High School, Mpumalanga
- University: University of Pretoria; University of Natal
- Notable relative(s): George Claassen (father); Antonie Claassen (son)
- Occupation: Architect

Rugby union career
- Position: No. 8
Amateur team(s)
Years	Team	Apps	(Points)
1976–80	University of Pretoria		
1981–85	University of Natal		
Provincial / State sides
Years	Team	Apps	(Points)
	Northern Transvaal	61	
-	Natal		
International career
Years	Team	Apps	(Points)
1981–82	Springboks	7	(0)
- Correct as of 6 July 2023
Coaching career
- Years: Team
- 1986–89: University of Natal

Wynand Claassen (born 16 January 1951, in Schweizer-Reneke) is a former South African rugby player and Springbok captain.

== Playing career ==
He was selected as eighth-man for Northern Transvaal whilst studying architecture at the University of Pretoria in the late 1970s. He formed a loose-trio with Thys Lourens and Burger Geldenhuys and soon had two Currie Cup final victories, in 1975 and 1977.

In 1980 he moved to Natal and was selected for the Springboks in 1981, captaining the team on his debut against Ireland. Despite Natal's relegation to the Currie Cup B section at the end of 1981 he continued as Springbok captain until 1984. He played seven test matches for the Springboks, all as captain and also played in six tour matches, scoring two tries.

Claassen is credited with reviving rugby at the University of Natal, both as a player and later as a coach. In 1988 he coached the Durban campus of the University of Natal to the Moor Cup title.

=== Test history ===
No.	Opposition	Result (SA 1st)	Position	Tries	Date	Venue
1.	Ireland	23–15	Number 8 (c)		30 May 1981	Newlands, Cape Town
2.	Ireland	12–10	Number 8 (c)		6 June 1981	Kings Park Stadium, Durban
3.	New Zealand	24–12	Number 8 (c)		29 August 1981	Athletic Park, Wellington
4.	New Zealand	22–25	Number 8 (c)		12 September 1981	Eden Park, Auckland
5.	United States	38–7	Number 8 (c)		20 September 1981	Owl Creek Polo ground, Glenville, New York
6.	South American Jaguars	50–18	Number 8 (c)		27 March 1982	Loftus Versfeld, Pretoria
7.	South American Jaguars	12–21	Number 8 (c)		3 April 1982	Free State Stadium, Bloemfontein

== Springbok captain ==
In 1981 he earned international acclaim as captain during the infamous "Rebel Tour" in New Zealand.

== Political influence in South African Rugby ==
Since retiring from the sport, he has maintained an active role in South African Rugby across the spectrum. He is often invited to the Captain's Table at various fund raising events.

He has also earned great respect through his active involvement along with other Springbok captains supporting AfriForum's memorandum against political interference and racial discrimination in rugby.

On 12 August 2008, Wynand Claassen and a delegation of former Springbok captains met with the South African Rugby Union as part of their campaign to express concerns and lobby against the use of race to determine team selection.

In this meeting they expressed their intent to send a memorandum to the International Rugby Board. They assert that racial discrimination in sport and team selection is in conflict with international sporting regulations.

== Autobiography ==
His autobiography, "More Than Just Rugby" was published in 1985.

== Social Appearances ==
Wynand Claassen was an honorary host on the Amabokoboko Blue Train which departed in June 2009 on a rare and distinguished journey from Pretoria. He played host to exclusive guests en route to watch the Springboks vs the British & Irish Lions in their first test match in Durban.

== Architect ==
Claassen is also an architecture graduate and occasional artist. In a Sunday Times interview with Jani Allan he described his passion for architecture: "I'm very interested in old architecture – I think it's a great pity that beautiful buildings that are part of our heritage are torn down to make way for great glass boxes." A self-portrait also accompanied the column.

== Personal ==
His father was George Claassen, a schoolmaster from Middelburg Hoërskool and winner of the 1961 Comrades Marathon between Pietermaritzburg and Durban.

== See also ==
- List of South Africa national rugby union players – Springbok no. 519

Sporting positions
Preceded by Theuns Stofberg	Springbok captain 1981–1982	Succeeded by Divan Serfontein
