= 2009 Currie Cup First Division =

Domestic rugby union competition

- Official logo
- Champions: Pumas

The 2009 Absa Currie Cup First Division season was contested from 11 July through to 16 October. The Currie Cup is an annual domestic competition for provincial rugby union teams in South Africa.

The Currie Cup tournament (also known as the Absa Currie Cup for sponsorship reasons) is South Africa's premier domestic rugby union competition, featuring teams representing either entire provinces or substantial regions within provinces.

The 2008 Champions The Griffons won their first Currie Cup First Division trophy by winning the Currie Cup First Division Final, against the Platinum Leopards in Potchefstroom on 10 October 2008, by 31 – 26.

The 2009 Champions The Pumas won their second Currie Cup First Division trophy by winning the Currie Cup First Division Final, against the SWD Eagles in Witbank on 16 October 2009, by 47 - 19.

== Standings ==
2009 Absa Currie Cup First Div
Team	P	W	D	L	PF	PA	PD	TF	TA	BP	Pts
Pumas	10	9	0	1	478	215	+263	62	26	8	44
SWD Eagles	10	7	0	3	259	193	+66	38	21	3	31
Griffons	10	6	1	3	285	271	+14	36	34	5	31
Mighty Elephants	10	5	0	5	264	232	+32	32	23	6	26
Border Bulldogs	10	2	1	7	256	302	-46	31	37	7	17
Valke	10	0	0	10	211	540	-329	28	76	3	3

Updated 6 October 2009:

=== Points Breakdown ===
- Four points for a win
- Two points for a draw
- One bonus point for a loss by seven points or less
- One bonus point for scoring four or more tries in a match

=== Table Notes ===
- P = Played
- W = Won
- D = Drawn
- L = Lost
- PF = points for
- PA = Points Against
- PD = Points Difference (PF - PA)
- TF = Tries For
- TA = Tries Against
- BP = Bonus points
- Pts = Total Points

== Teams ==
- Border Bulldogs
- Griffons
- Mighty Elephants
- Pumas
- SWD Eagles
- Valke

== Fixtures and results ==
- Fixtures are subject to change.
- All times are South African (GMT+2).

== Compulsory Friendlies ==
15:00 2009-06-06

Mighty Elephants	10 – 72	Western Province
	Scoreboard

EPRFU Stadium, Port Elizabeth

15:00 2009-06-26

Valke	20 – 67	Griquas
	Scoreboard

Barnard Stadium, Kempton Park

19:00 2009-06-26

SWD Eagles	15 – 42	Free State Cheetahs
	Scoreboard

Outeniqua Park, George

19:05 2009-07-01

Border Bulldogs	0 – 58	Blue Bulls
	Scoreboard

Border Rugby Stadium, East London

15:00 2009-07-03

Griffons	7 – 54	Golden Lions
	Scoreboard

North West Stadium, Welkom

== July 2009 ==
15:00 2009-07-11

Mighty Elephants	16 – 10	Border Bulldogs
	Scoreboard

Central Grounds, Uitenhage
Referee: Jason Jaftha

15:00 2009-07-11

Valke	27 – 39	Griffons
	Scoreboard

Barnard Stadium, Kempton Park
Referee: Jonathan Kaplan

17:05 2009-07-17

Border Bulldogs	10 – 11	SWD Eagles
	Scoreboard

Border Rugby Stadium, East London

15:00 2009-07-18

Pumas	79 – 24	Valke
	Scoreboard

Puma Stadium, Witbank

15:00 2009-07-18

Griffons	36 – 25	Mighty Elephants
	Scoreboard

North West Stadium, Welkom

19:00 2009-07-24

SWD Eagles	13 – 3	Griffons
	Scoreboard

Outeniqua Park, George

14:00 2009-07-25

Mighty Elephants	25 – 27	Pumas
	Scoreboard

Central Grounds, Uitenhage

== August 2009 ==
2009-08-07
18:00

Pumas	44 - 26	SWD Eagles
	Scoreboard

Puma Stadium, Witbank
Referee: Mark Lawrence

2009-08-08
15:00

Valke	30 - 36	Mighty Elephants
	Scoreboard

Barnard Stadium, Kempton Park
Attendance: 150
Referee: Jason Jaftha

2009-08-08
15:00

Griffons	63 - 45	Border Bulldogs
	Scoreboard

North West Stadium, Welkom
Attendance: 600
Referee: Jonathan Kaplan

15:00 2009-08-15

SWD Eagles	47 - 15	Valke

Outeniqua Park, George

2009-08-15

Border Bulldogs	12 - 47	Pumas

Border Rugby Stadium

2009-08-22

Pumas	43 - 7	Griffons

Stadium tbc

2009-08-22

Valke	31 - 48	Border Bulldogs

Barnard Stadium, Kempton Park

2009-08-22

Mighty Elephants	6 - 15	SWD Eagles

Stadium tbc

2009-08-28

Border Bulldogs	28 - 37	Mighty Elephants

Border Rugby Stadium

2009-08-28

Griffons	35 - 19	Valke

North West Stadium, Welkom

== September 2009 ==
2009-09-05

Valke	14 - 95	Pumas

Barnard Stadium, Kempton Park

2009-09-05

Mighty Elephants	29 - 16	Griffons

EPRFU Stadium

15:00 2009-09-05

SWD Eagles	14 - 13	Border Bulldogs

Outeniqua Park, George

2009-09-12

Pumas	44 - 30	Mighty Elephants

Puma Stadium, Witbank

2009-09-12

Griffons	26 - 21	SWD Eagles

North West Stadium, Welkom

2009-09-18

Border Bulldogs	25 - 35	Griffons

Border Rugby Stadium

2009-09-19

Mighty Elephants	44- 8	Valke

Nelson Mandela Bay Stadium

15:00 2009-09-19

SWD Eagles	16 - 32	Pumas

Outeniqua Park, George

2009-09-26

Pumas	43 - 26	Border Bulldogs

Puma Stadium, Witbank

2009-09-26

Valke	28 - 78	SWD Eagles

Barnard Stadium, Kempton Park

== October 2009 ==
2009-10-03

SWD Eagles	18 - 16	Mighty Elephants

Outeniqua Park, George

2009-10-03

Border Bulldogs	39 - 15	Valke

Sisa Dukashe Stadium

== Knock Out Stage ==
Semi-finals
2009-10-09 17:05 - Puma Stadium, Witbank
Pumas	31
Mighty Elephants	18
2009-10-09 19:10 - Outeniqua Park, George
SWD Eagles	31
Griffons	18

Final
2009-10-16 - Puma Stadium, Witbank
Pumas	47
SWD Eagles	19

== Semi finals ==
2009-10-09
17:05

Pumas	31 - 18	Mighty Elephants

Puma Stadium, Witbank

2009-10-09
19:10

SWD Eagles	31 - 18	Griffons

Outeniqua Park, George

== Final ==
2009-10-16

Pumas	47 - 19	SWD Eagles

Puma Stadium, Witbank

2009 Absa Currie Cup
First Division Champions

Pumas
2nd Title

== Promotion/relegation Matches ==
=== Round 1 ===
15:30 2009-10-24

Boland Cavaliers	36 – 35	Pumas
	Scoreboard

Boland Stadium, Wellington
Referee: Jonathan Kaplan

17:30 2009-10-24

Platinum Leopards	47 – 42	SWD Eagles
	Scoreboard

Olën Park, Potchefstroom
Attendance: 4,000
Referee: Marius Jonker

=== Round 2 ===
16:00 2009-10-30

SWD Eagles	18 – 17	Platinum Leopards
	Scoreboard

Outeniqua Park, George

18:00 2009-10-30

Pumas	40 – 3	Boland Cavaliers
	Scoreboard

Puma Stadium, Witbank

The Pumas are promoted to the Premier Division while the Boland Cavaliers are relegated to the First Division. The Platinum Leopards retain their place in the Premier Division while the SWD Eagles remain in the First Division.
