= Flip Geel =

South African rugby union player (1914–1971)

- Full name: Philippus Johannes Geel
- Born: 7 February 1914 Boshof, South Africa
- Died: 12 June 1971 (aged 57) Florida, South Africa
- Height: 1.89 m (6 ft 2 in)
- Weight: 106.6 kg (235 lb)

Rugby union career
- Position: Lock
Provincial / State sides
Years	Team	Apps	(Points)
- Northern Transvaal
- Orange Free State
International career
Years	Team	Apps	(Points)
1949	South Africa	1	(0)

Philippus Johannes Geel (7 February 1914 – 12 June 1971) was a South African international rugby union player.

A forward from Boshof, Geel captained Northern Transvaal to the 1946 Currie Cup title and later moved to Orange Free State, from where he received his Springboks call up at the late age of 35. His opportunity came in their home series against the 1949 All Blacks and he had been considered as one of the candidates to captain the side. He however didn't feature until the third of the four Test matches at Kingsmead, playing as a lock forward for his only Springboks cap.

Geel died of heart failure in 1971.

== See also ==
- List of South Africa national rugby union players
