= Darius Botha =

South African rugby union footballer

- Born: Daniël Sarel Botha; 26 June 1955 Breyten, Mpumalanga, South Africa
- Died: 12 February 2018 (aged 62)
- Height: 1.83 m (6 ft 0 in)
- Weight: 93 kg (205 lb)
- School: Hendrik Verwoerd High School, Pretoria
- University: University of Pretoria, University of Stellenbosch
- Notable relative: Naas Botha (brother)

Rugby union career
- Position: Wing
Provincial / State sides
Years	Team	Apps	(Points)
1976–1981	Northern Transvaal	61	
International career
Years	Team	Apps	(Points)
1981	South Africa	1	

Daniël Sarel 'Darius' Botha (26 June 1955 – 12 February 2018) was a South African rugby union player.

== Playing career ==
Botha played for the Northern Transvaal under–20 side in 1974 to 1975 and made his debut for the Northern Transvaal senior side in 1976. He and his younger brother Naas, played for Northern Transvaal in five Currie Cup finals from 1977 to 1981. In four of those five years, 1977, 1978, 1980 and 1981 Northern Transvaal won the Currie Cup and in 1979 they shared it with Western Province.

Botha played in only one test match for the Springboks, being the first test on the 1981 tour to New Zealand at Lancaster Park, Christchurch. He also played in seven tour matches for the Springboks, scoring three tries.

=== Test history ===
No.	Opposition	Result (SA 1st)	Position	Points	Date	Venue
1.	New Zealand	9–14	Wing		15 August 1981	Lancaster Park, Christchurch

== Death ==
Botha was first diagnosed with stomach cancer in 2014. After an operation the cancer went into remission, but unfortunately in November 2017, the cancer returned and Botha died on 12 February 2018.

== See also ==
- List of South Africa national rugby union players – Springbok no. 522
