= Div Visser =

South African rugby union footballer

- Born: Johann De Villiers Visser; 26 November 1958 (age 67) Cape Town, South Africa
- Height: 1.94 m (6 ft 4 in)
- Weight: 110 kg (243 lb)
- School: Voortrekker High School, Wynberg, Cape Town

Rugby union career
Provincial / State sides
Years	Team	Apps	(Points)
1979–1990	Western Province	106	(76)
International career
Years	Team	Apps	(Points)
1981	South Africa	2	

Johann De Villiers 'Div' Visser (born 26 November 1958 in Cape Town, South Africa is a former South African rugby union player.

== Playing career ==
Visser played for Western Province in the South African Currie Cup competition. Visser made his debut for the Springboks during the 1981 tour of New Zealand in the second test on 29 August 1981 at Athletic Park, Wellington, New Zealand. He also played in the Springboks' first ever test against the USA on 20 September 1981 at the Owl Creek Polo ground in Glenville, New York. Visser also played in 10 tour matches for the Springboks, in which he scored four tries.

=== Test history ===
No.	Opposition	Result (SA 1st)	Position	Tries	Date	Venue
1.	New Zealand	24–12	Lock		29 August 1981	Athletic Park, Wellington
2.	United States	38–7	Lock		20 September 1981	Owl Creek Polo ground, Glenville, New York

== See also ==
- List of South Africa national rugby union players – Springbok no. 517
