= 1981 South Africa rugby union tour of New Zealand and the United States =

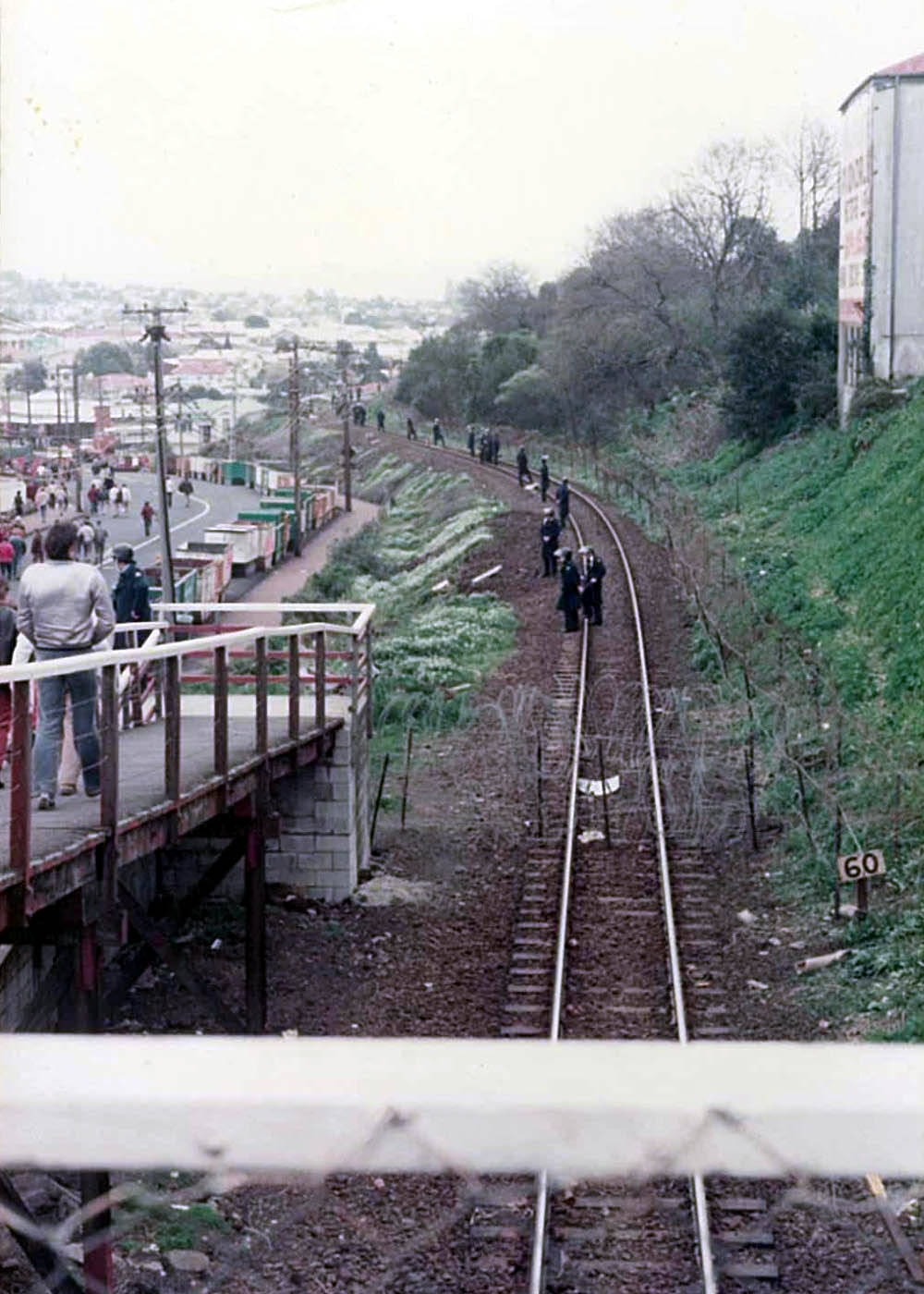
Police officers guarding a barbed wire perimeter around Eden Park near Kingsland railway station.

The 1981 South African rugby tour (known in New Zealand as the 1981 Springbok Tour, and in South Africa as the Rebel Tour) polarised opinions and inspired widespread protests across New Zealand. The controversy also extended to the United States, where the South African rugby team continued their tour after departing New Zealand.

Apartheid had made South Africa an international pariah, and other countries were strongly discouraged from having sporting contacts with it. Rugby union was (and still is) an extremely popular sport in New Zealand, and the South African national team, known as the Springboks, were considered to be New Zealand's most formidable opponents. Therefore, there was a major split in opinion in New Zealand as to whether politics should influence sport in this way and whether the Springboks should be allowed to tour.

The dispute was similar to that involving Peter Hain in the United Kingdom in the early 1970s, when Hain's Stop the Tour campaign clashed with the more conservative 'Freedom Under Law' movement championed by barrister Francis Bennion. The police response to the protests also became a focus of controversy. Although the protests were among the most intense in New Zealand's recent history, no deaths or serious injuries resulted.

After the tour, no official sporting contact took place between New Zealand and South Africa until the early 1990s, after apartheid had been abolished. The tour has been said to have led to a decline in the popularity of rugby union in New Zealand, until the 1987 Rugby World Cup.

== Background ==
A 1959 poster advertising a meeting of the Citizens' All Black Tour Association to protest against racially selected All Blacks teams touring South Africa.

The Springboks and New Zealand's national rugby team, the All Blacks, have a long tradition of intense and friendly sporting rivalry. From 1948 to 1969, the South African apartheid regime affected team selection for the All Blacks, with selectors passing over Māori players for some All Black tours to South Africa. Opposition to sending race-based teams to South Africa grew throughout the 1950s and 1960s, and prior to the All Blacks' tour of South Africa in 1960, 150,000 New Zealanders – 6.25% of the country's population at that time – signed a petition supporting a policy of "No Maoris, No Tour". Despite this, the tour went ahead, and in 1969, Halt All Racist Tours (HART) was formed.

During the 1970s, public protests and political pressure forced on the NZRFU the choice of either fielding a team not selected by race, or not touring South Africa: after South African rugby authorities continued to select Springbok players by race, the Norman Kirk Labour Government barred the Springboks from touring New Zealand in 1973. In response, the NZRFU protested about the involvement of "politics in sport".

On 28 March 1976, the final game of ex-All Black Fergie McCormick was played at Lancaster Park in Christchurch, to which two Springbok players had been invited. Ten days before the game, protesters had written "WELCOME TO RACIST GAME" in 20-foot high letters on the pitch using weed-killer.

The All Blacks toured South Africa in 1976 with the blessing of the newly elected New Zealand prime minister, Robert Muldoon. In response, 25 African nations boycotted the 1976 Summer Olympics in Montreal, stating that in their view the All Blacks tour gave tacit support to the apartheid regime in South Africa: the IOC declined to ban New Zealand from the Olympics on the grounds that rugby union was no longer an Olympic sport. The tour attracted several anti-apartheid protests in New Zealand, including one on 28 May 1976 in Cathedral Square, Christchurch, which attracted 1000–1500 people and included guerrilla theatre. Protesters also attempted to disrupt television coverage of the first test by vandalising the Makara Hill microwave station in Wellington, which was responsible for relaying programming in and out of TV One's Avalon studios.

The 1976 tour contributed to the creation of the Gleneagles Agreement that was adopted by the Commonwealth Heads of Government Meeting in 1977, wherein Commonwealth heads of state agreed to discourage competition with sporting teams from South Africa.

== Tour of New Zealand ==
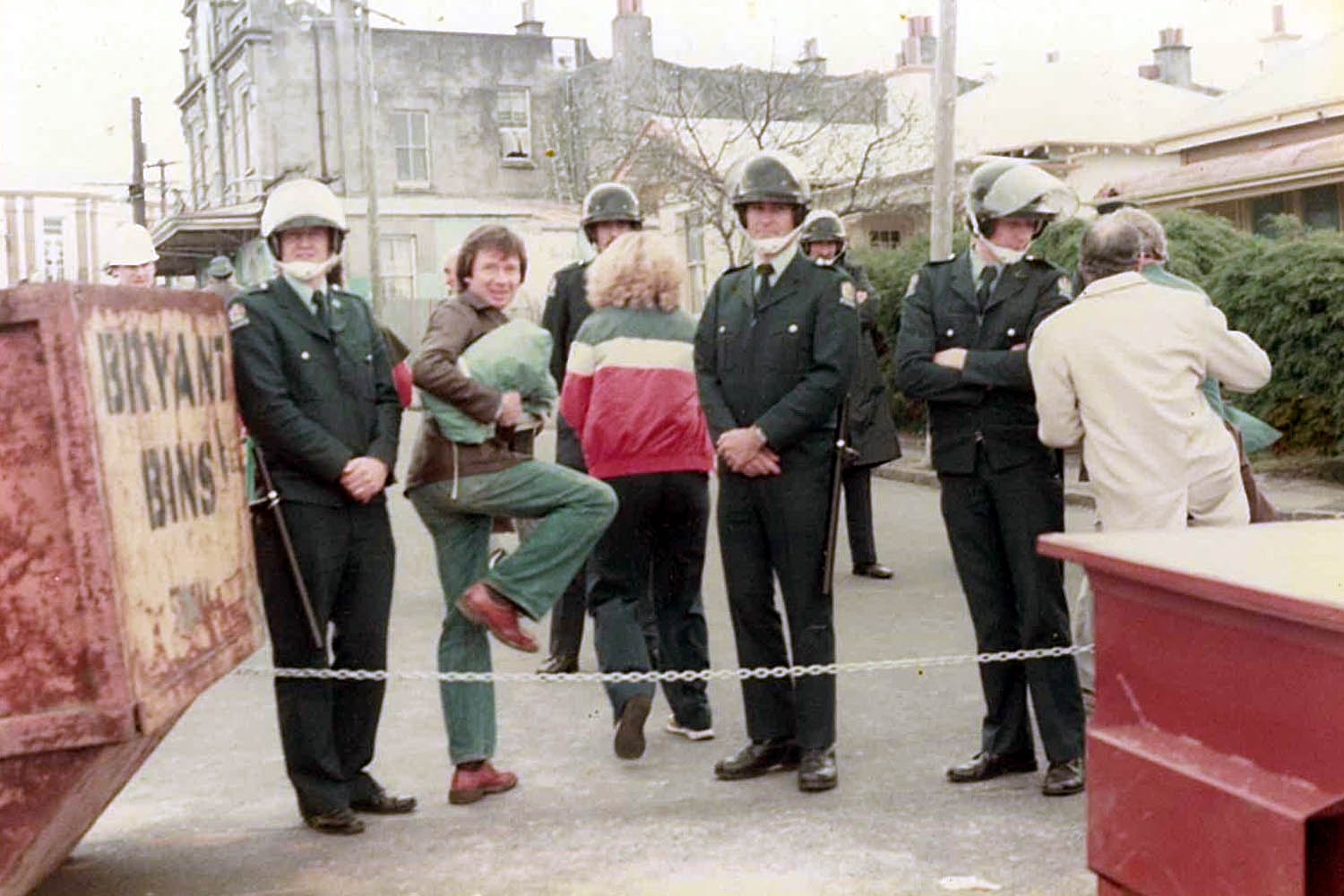
Entry to Eden Park before the Auckland test match

By the early 1980s, the pressure from other countries and from protest groups in New Zealand such as HART reached a head when the NZRFU proposed a Springbok tour for 1981. This became a topic of political contention due to the international sports boycott. After the Australian Prime Minister, Malcolm Fraser, refused permission for the Springboks' aircraft to refuel in Australia, the Springboks' flights to and from New Zealand went via New York, Los Angeles and Hawaii.

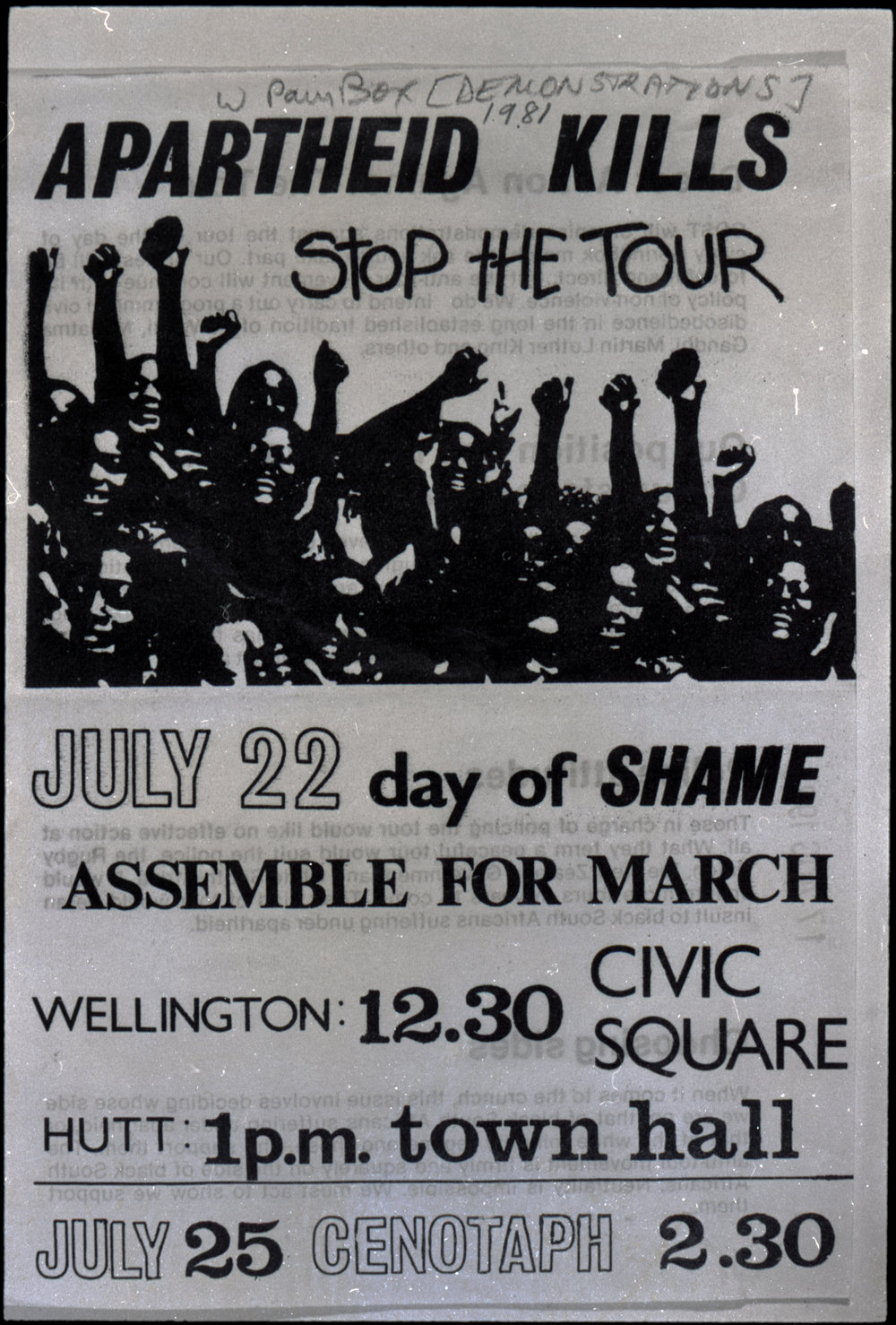
Anti-tour poster from Wellington

Despite pressure for the Muldoon government to cancel the tour, permission was granted for it, and the Springboks arrived in New Zealand on 19 July 1981. Since 1977 Muldoon's government had been a party to the Gleneagles Agreement, in which the countries of the Commonwealth accepted that it was:

the urgent duty of each of their Governments vigorously to combat the evil of apartheid by withholding any form of support for, and by taking every practical step to discourage contact or competition by their nationals with sporting organisations, teams or sportsmen from South Africa or from any other country where sports are organised on the basis of race, colour or ethnic origin.

Despite this, Muldoon also argued that New Zealand was a free and democratic country, and that "politics should stay out of sport". In the years following the Gleneagles Agreement, it seemed that New Zealand government members did not feel bound to the Gleneagles agreement, and disregarded it. However, some historians claim that, "the [Gleneagles] agreement remained vague enough to avoid the New Zealand government from having to use coercive powers such as withdrawing visas and passports." This means Muldoon's government technically was not bound to the agreement to the extent it outwardly appeared to the public. In addition to this, Ben Couch, who was the minister for Māori development at the time, stated, "I believe that the Gleneagles agreement has been forced upon us by people who do not have the same kind of democracy that we have."

Muldoon made some effort to discourage the tour and stated that he could see "nothing but trouble coming from this". "A Springbok tour would dash to the ground all that has been achieved as a result of international acceptance", wrote deputy Prime Minister Brian Talboys to the chairman of the NZRFU in a further attempt to discourage the tour, "[the tour] may affect the harmonious development of the Commonwealth and international sport".

Some rugby supporters echoed the separation of politics and sport, while other rugby supporters argued that if the tour were cancelled, there would be no reporting of the widespread criticism of apartheid in New Zealand in the controlled South African media.

Muldoon's critics felt that he allowed the tour in order for his National Party to secure the votes of rural and provincial conservatives in the general election later in the year, which National won. Along with Muldoon's policy of "leaving sporting contacts to sporting bodies", Muldoon also held the opinion that the disruption and division of New Zealand was not caused by the NZRFU, nor the Springboks, but the anti-tour protesters themselves. This argument was vehemently refuted by anti-tour voices, political activist Tom Newnham claimed that the government enabled "the greatest breakdown in law and order [New Zealand] has ever witnessed."

The ensuing public protests polarised New Zealand: while rugby fans filled the football grounds, protest crowds filled the surrounding streets, and on one occasion succeeded in invading the pitch and stopping the game.

Initially the anti-tour movement was committed to non-violent civil disobedience, demonstrations and direct action. As protection for the Springboks, the police created two special riot squads, the Red and Blue Squads. These police were, controversially, the first in New Zealand to be issued with visored riot helmets and long batons (more commonly the side-handle baton). Some protesters were intimidated and interpreted this initial police response as overkill and heavy-handed tactics. After early disruptions, police began to require that all spectators assemble in sports grounds at least an hour before kick-off. While the protests were meant to be largely peaceful resistance to the Springbok tour, quite often there were "violent confrontations with rugby supporters and specially trained riot police".

At Gisborne on the day before the match anti-tour activists, including Mereana Pitman, gained access to the pitch with a vehicle and tipped broken glass on the pitch. On 22 July, protesters managed to break through a fence, but quick action by spectators and ground security prevented the game being disrupted. Some protesters were beaten by police. From the very first match of the tour in Gisborne, protester tension levels ran high, and one protester, cartoonist Murray Ball, who was the son of an All Black, recalled that it "was strange for New Zealanders to feel so aggressive towards other New Zealanders" and that he was "scared as hell" when he came up against pro-tour defenders.

=== Hamilton: Game cancelled ===
At Rugby Park, Hamilton (the site of today's Waikato Stadium), on 25 July, about 350 protesters invaded the pitch after pulling down a fence. The police arrested about 50 of them over a period of an hour, but were concerned that they could not control the rugby crowd, who were throwing bottles and other objects at the protesters. Following reports that a stolen light plane (piloted by Pat McQuarrie) was approaching the stadium, police cancelled the match.

The protesters were ushered from the ground and were advised by protest marshals to remove any anti-tour insignia from their attire, with enraged rugby spectators lashing out at them. Gangs of rugby supporters waited outside Hamilton police station for arrested protesters to be processed and released, and assaulted some protesters making their way into Victoria Street. There are many reports from protesters feeling unsafe during this protest. "It was terrifying, I don’t know how big the crowd was, but they were clearly furious .... The police looked vulnerable as they spread out around the whole ground", recollects one protester.

=== Wellington: Molesworth Street protest ===
The aftermath of the Hamilton game, followed by the bloody batoning of marchers in Wellington's Molesworth Street in the following week, in which police batoned bare-headed protesters, led to the radicalisation of the protest movement. There were many instances where the protesters feared for their safety, especially considering the violence that began on Molesworth Street, where police are said to have "behaved rather too similarly to South African police", according to Tom Newnham. Former police officer, Ross Meurant, who was pro-tour, said of the Molesworth St protest: "The protestors, who so obviously lacked self-control, were that evening privy to a classic display of discipline." This perspective of the police tactics was opposed by anti-tour activists, with claims that protesters were "savagely attacked by police", and that "police provoked violence". While Newnham's claims that the violence towards protesters from police was unjustified was likely true in his experience, Meurant maintained that there were protesters who intended to inflict "serious injury or disfigurement" on the police.

After this event many protesters began to wear motorcycle or bicycle helmets to protect themselves from batons and head injury.

The authorities strengthened security at public facilities after protesters disrupted telecommunications by damaging a waveguide on a microwave repeater, disrupting telephone and data services, though TV transmissions continued as they were carried by a separate waveguide on the tower. Army engineers were deployed, and the remaining grounds were surrounded with razor wire and shipping container barricades to decrease the chances of another pitch invasion. At Eden Park, an emergency escape route was constructed from the visitors' changing rooms for use if the stadium was overrun by protesters. Crowds of anti-tour protesters stood outside as the police were overwhelmed but the hundreds of police still managed to prevent the protesters from entering the stadium.

=== Christchurch ===
At Lancaster Park, Christchurch, on 15 August, some protesters managed to break through a security cordon and a number invaded the pitch. They were quickly removed and forcibly ejected from the stadium by the police. A large demonstration managed to occupy the street adjacent to the ground and confront the riot police. Spectators were kept in the ground until the protesters dispersed.

=== Auckland: plane invasion ===
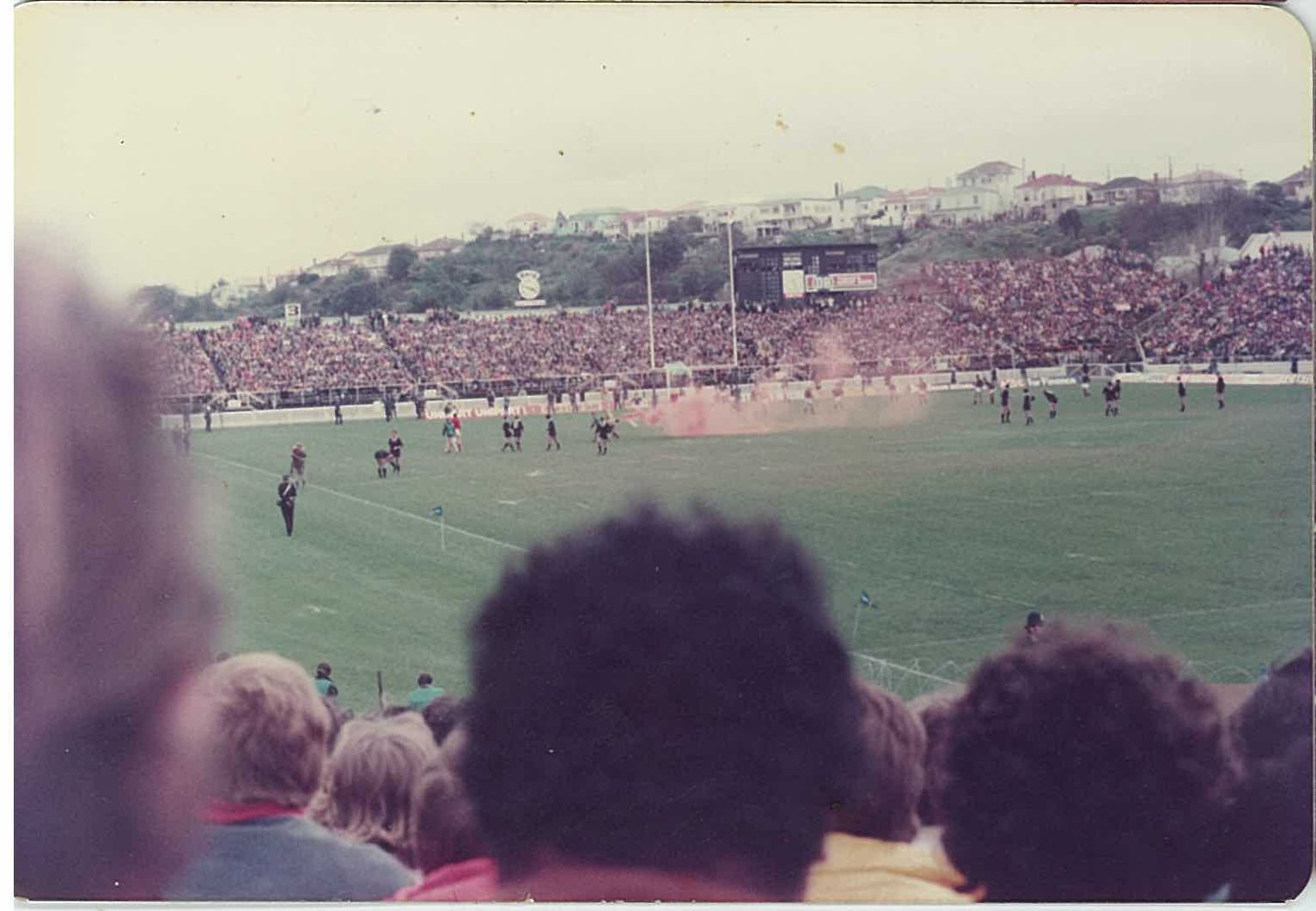
A smoke bomb at Eden Park

A low-flying Cessna 172 piloted by Marx Jones and Grant Cole disrupted the final test at Eden Park, Auckland, on 12 September by dropping flour-bombs on the pitch, despite which the game continued. "Patches" of criminal gangs, such as traditional rivals Black Power and the Mongrel Mob, were also evident. (Black Power were Muldoon supporters.). A group of peaceful protestors dressed as clowns were beaten with batons by police.

Outside Eden Park, clashes between protesters, spectators and police resulted in 201 arrests, while more than 90 police officers and protesters were injured. The same day in Warkworth, Dunedin and Timaru protesters stormed the local TV transmitters and shut off coverage of the game.

== The protest movement ==
Some of the protests had the dual purpose of linking racial discrimination against Māori in New Zealand to apartheid in South Africa. Some of the protesters, particularly young Māori, felt frustrated by the image of New Zealand as a paradise for racial unity. Many opponents of racism in New Zealand in the early 1980s saw it as useful to use the protests against South Africa as a vehicle for wider social action. However, some Māori supported the tour and attended games. John Minto, the national organizer for HART, thought that the tour "stimulate[d] the whole debate about racism and the place of Māori in our community." Political activist Tom Newnham's opinion echoes that of Minto's, albeit considerably more radical, stating that "we are basically the same as white South Africans, just as racist." Some of those protesting racism in South Africa felt inclined to reflect on the racial divide in their own country, before condemning another – part-Māori rugby spectator Kevin Taylor did not join the protests because he "wanted New Zealand to fix its own issues before New Zealanders started telling other countries how to fix their problems."

== Tour of the United States ==
Exhausted physically and mentally, even the Springboks by and large had no idea why they were travelling to the United States, a country with little rugby presence. Partially they had to travel through the United States, because countries like India and Australia refused to allow South African carriers access to their air space. What followed was a largely farcical affair. With the American leg of the tour following directly after the events of New Zealand, further protests and clashes with police were expected. Threats of riots caused city officials in Los Angeles, Chicago, New York City and Rochester to withdraw their previous authorisation for the Springboks to play in their cities.

=== Midwest ===
The Springboks' match against the Midwest All Stars team had originally been intended to be played in Chicago. Following the anti-apartheid protests, it was secretly rescheduled to the mid morning of Saturday 19 September at Roosevelt Park in Racine, Wisconsin. The clandestine strategy seemingly worked as around 500 spectators gathered to watch the match. Late in the game, however, a small number of protesters arrived to disrupt proceedings and two were arrested after a brief altercation broke out on the field.

=== Albany: pipe bomb ===
The cancelled New York City match against the Eastern All Stars was moved upstate to Albany. The long serving Mayor of Albany, Erastus Corning, maintained that there was a right of peaceful assembly to "publicly espouse an unpopular cause", despite his own stated view that "I abhor everything about apartheid". Governor Hugh Carey argued that the event should be barred as the anti-apartheid demonstrators presented an "imminent danger of riot", but a Federal court ruling allowing the game to be played was upheld in the United States Court of Appeals. A further appeal to Supreme Court Justice Thurgood Marshall was also overruled on the grounds of free speech.

The match went ahead with around a thousand demonstrators (including Pete Seeger) corralled 100 yards away from the field of play, which was surrounded by the police. No violence occurred at the game but a pipe bomb was set off in the early morning outside the headquarters of the Eastern Rugby Union resulting in damage to the building estimated at $50,000. No one was injured.

=== Glenville ===
The final match of the tour, against the United States national team, took place in secret at Glenville in upstate New York. The twenty-nine spectators recorded at the match is the lowest ever attendance for an international rugby match. Increasingly isolated, the Springboks would not play outside of South Africa again until the 1990s and the waning days of apartheid.

== The matches ==
1981 Springbok tour
- Manager: Johan Claassen
- Tour captain: Wynand Claassen
Summary
P	W	D	L
Total
17	14	1	2
Test match
4	2	0	2
Opponent
P	W	D	L
New Zealand
3	1	0	2
United States
1	1	0	0

=== In New Zealand ===
Schedule of matches
Date	Venue	Team	Winner and score
Wed 22 July	Gisborne	Poverty Bay	SA 6–24
Sat 25 July	Hamilton	Waikato	cancelled
Wed 29 July	New Plymouth	Taranaki	SA 9–34
Sat 1 August	Palmerston North	Manawatu	SA 19–31
Wed 5 August	Whanganui	Wanganui	SA 9–45
Sat 8 August	Invercargill	Southland	SA 6–22
Tue 11 August	Dunedin	Otago	SA 13–17
Sat 15 August	Christchurch	New Zealand (1st Test)	NZ 14–9
Tue 19 August	Timaru	South Canterbury	cancelled
Sat 22 August	Nelson	Nelson Bays	SA 0–83
Tue 25 August	Napier	NZ Māori	12–12
Sat 29 August	Wellington	New Zealand (2nd Test)	SA 12–24
Tue 2 September	Rotorua	Bay of Plenty	SA 24–29
Sat 5 September	Auckland	Auckland	SA 12–39
Tue 8 September	Whangārei	North Auckland	SA 10–19
Sat 12 September	Auckland	New Zealand (3rd Test)	NZ 25–22

=== In United States ===
Schedule of matches
Date	Venue	Team	Winner and score
Sat 19 September	Racine, Wisconsin	Midwest All Stars	SA 46–12
Tue 22 September	Albany, New York	Eastern All Stars	SA 41–0
Fri 25 September	Glenville, New York	United States (Test match)	SA 38–7

=== Touring party ===
- Manager: Johan Claassen
- Assistant Manager: Abe Williams
- Coach: Nelie Smith (Free State)
- Captain: Wynand Claassen

Name	Position	Provincial Team	Age (in 1981)	Height (m)	Weight (kg)	Occupation	Caps
Gysie Pienaar	Fullback	Free State	26	1.75	85	Development Officer	10
Johan Heunis	Fullback	Northern Transvaal	23	1.85	85	Serviceman	–
Edrich Krantz	Wing	Free State	26	1.83	82	Doctor	2
Ray Mordt	Wing	Transvaal	24	1.81	89	Representative	10
Darius Botha	Wing	Northern Transvaal	26	1.83	93	Pastor	–
Gerrie Germishuys	Wing	Transvaal	31	1.83	90	Sports officer	17
Carel du Plessis	Centre	Western Province	21	1.84	85	Student	–
Willie du Plessis	Centre	Western Province	25	1.80	83	Serviceman	9
Errol Tobias	Centre	Boland	31	1.74	77	Artisan	2
Danie Gerber	Centre	Eastern Province	26	1.85	90	Clerk	35
Colin Beck	Flyhalf	Western Province	22	1.80	82	Student	–
Naas Botha	Flyhalf	Northern Transvaal	23	1.79	73	Sports officer	11
Divan Serfontein	Scrumhalf	Western Province	26	1.67	64	Doctor	9
Barry Wolmarans	Scrumhalf	Free State	32	1.65	68	Development Officer	1
Wynand Claassen	No. 8	Natal	30	1.85	90	Architect	2
Johan Marais	No. 8	Northern Transvaal	22	1.94	92	Student	–
Thys Burger	Flanker	Northern Transvaal	26	1.95	92	Sports Officer	2
Burger Geldenhuys	Flanker	Northern Transvaal	25	1.88	91	Student	–
Eben Jansen	Flanker	Free State	27	1.90	98	Development Officer	–
Rob Louw	Flanker	Western Province	26	1.89	91	Sports Officer	11
Theuns Stofberg	Lock	Northern Transvaal	26	1.95	105	Physiotherapist	15
Div Visser	Lock	Western Province	23	1.95	109	Air Force Technician	–
Hennie Bekker	Lock	Western Province	28	2.00	113	Sports officer	–
Louis Moolman	Lock	Northern Transvaal	30	1.95	111	Farmer	12
Flippie van der Merwe	Prop	South Western Districts	23	1.96	130	Serviceman	–
Ockie Oosthuizen	Prop	Northern Transvaal	26	1.88	102	Serviceman	2
Hempies du Toit	Prop	Western Province	28	1.85	100	Farmer	–
Henning van Aswegen	Prop	Western Province	26	1.86	95	Businessman	–
Willie Kahts	Hooker	Northern Transvaal	34	1.80	91	Teacher	8
Robert Cockrell	Hooker	Western Province	31	1.83	90	Representative	7
Shaun Povey	Hooker (tour replacement)	Western Province	26	1.84	92	Student	–
Gawie Visagie	Scrumhalf (tour replacement)	Natal	26	1.81	82	Representative	–

== Aftermath ==
The Muldoon government was re-elected in the 1981 election losing three seats to leave it with a majority of one.

The NZRFU constitution contained much high-minded wording about promoting the image of rugby and New Zealand, and generally being a benefit to society. In 1985, the NZRFU proposed an All Black tour of South Africa: two lawyers successfully sued it, claiming such a tour would breach its constitution. A High Court injunction by Justice Casey saw the tour cancelled.

Afterwards, the All Blacks would not tour South Africa until after the fall of the apartheid regime, with the next official tour in 1992. After the 1985 tour was cancelled, an unofficial tour took place a year later by a team that included 28 out of the 30 All Blacks selected for the 1985 tour, known as the New Zealand Cavaliers, a team that was often advertised in South Africa as the All Blacks and/or depicted with the Silver Fern.

After the All Blacks won the 1987 Rugby World Cup, rugby union was once again the dominant sport – in both spectator and participant numbers – in New Zealand.

== In New Zealand culture ==
- Prominent artist Ralph Hotere painted a Black Union Jack series of paintings in protest against the tour.
- Merata Mita's documentary film Patu! (1983) tells the tale of the tour from a Māori perspective. Patu! was added to New Zealand's national UNESCO Memory of the World Register in 2012.
- Music popularly associated with the tour included the punk band RIOT 111, and the songs "Riot Squad" by the Newmatics and "There Is No Depression in New Zealand" by Blam Blam Blam.
- Ross Meurant, commander of the police "Red Squad", published Red Squad Story in 1982, giving a conservative view. ISBN 978-0-908630-06-6
- The TVNZ 1980s police drama Mortimer's Patch included a flashback episode of the (younger) main character's tour police duties
- In 1984 Geoff Chapple wrote the book 1981: The Tour, chronicling the events from the protesters' perspective. ISBN 978-0-589-01534-3
- In 1999 Glenn Wood's biography Cop Out covered the tour from the perspective of a frontline policeman. ISBN 978-0-908704-89-7
- David Hill's book The Name of the Game is the story of a schoolboy's personal struggles during the tour. ISBN 978-0-908783-63-2
- Tom Newnham's book By Batons And Barbed Wire is one of the largest collections of photos and general information of the protest movement during the tour. ISBN 978-0-473-00253-4 (hardback). ISBN 978-0-473-00112-4 (paperback)
- The documentary 1981: A Country at War chronicled the tour from various perspectives.
- Te Papa has objects related to the tour including images, helmets and an entrance ticket. The exhibition Slice of Heaven: 20th Century Aotearoa has a section about the tour.
- Rage, a dramatisation of the tour by Tom Scott, was filmed in mid-2011 and was broadcast on TV One on 4 September 2011.
- The Engine Room, a play by Ralph McCubbin Howell, opened at BATS Theatre in Wellington on 27 September 2011. It contrasts the stories and viewpoints of John Key and Helen Clark during the tour and the 2008 general election.
- The second series of the television show Westside takes place during the events of the tour and portrays the main characters' involvement in several of the major incidents.
- Uproar, a 2023 New Zealand coming-of-age comedy-drama film. In 1981, relates the story of a 17-year-old boy who supports the 1981 Springboks tour is drawn into political activism to stand up for himself, his family and his future.

== See also ==
- 1971 South Africa rugby union tour of Australia
- History of South Africa in the apartheid era
- Ces Blazey
- Politics and sports
- Sporting boycott of South Africa

== Bibliography ==
- Catsam, Derek Charles (2021). Flashpoint: How a Little-Known Sporting Event Fueled America's Anti-Apartheid Movement. Lanham, Maryland: Rowman and Littlefield. ISBN 978-1538144695.
- Chapple, Geoff (1984). 1981: The Tour. Wellington: A H & A W Reed. ISBN 978-0-589-01534-3.
- Newnham, Tom (1981). By Batons and Barbed Wire. New Zealand: Real Pictures Ltd. ISBN 978-0-473-00112-4.
- Richards, Trevor (1999). Dancing on Our Bones: New Zealand, South Africa, Rugby and Racism. Wellington, New Zealand: Bridget Williams Books. ISBN 1-877-242-004.
