= 1911 Currie Cup =

Domestic rugby union competition

- Countries: South Africa
- Champions: Griqualand West (2nd title)

The 1911 Currie Cup was the tenth edition of the Currie Cup, the premier domestic rugby union competition in South Africa.

The tournament was won by Griqualand West for the second time, who won six of their matches in the competition and drew the other match.

This tournament also marked the first ever loss for Western Province, who previously went 48 matches unbeaten in the competition since its inception in 1892, winning 46 and drawing two of those matches. Griqualand West beat them 12–0 in the tournament held in Cape Town.

== See also ==
- Currie Cup
