= Howard Watt =

South African rugby union footballer and cricketer

- Born: Howard Hugh Watt; 1 March 1911 Rosebank, Cape Town, Cape Province
- Died: 17 August 2005 (aged 94) Howick, KwaZulu-Natal, South Africa
- School: Diocesan College, Rondebosch

Rugby union career
- Position: Loose-forward
Amateur team(s)
Years	Team	Apps	(Points)
- Villagers FC
Provincial / State sides
Years	Team	Apps	(Points)
1935–36	Western Province		
1938	Transvaal		
International career
Years	Team	Apps	(Points)
1937	South Africa (tour)	7	(9)
- Cricket career

Cricket information
- Batting: Right-handed
- Bowling: Right-arm fast-medium

Domestic team information
- Years: Team
- 1933/34–1934/35: Western Province
- 1946/47: North Eastern Transvaal

Career statistics
Competition	First-class
Matches	12
Runs scored	115
Batting average	7.66
100s/50s	0/0
Top score	22
Balls bowled	2,681
Wickets	44
Bowling average	24.54
5 wickets in innings	2
10 wickets in match	0
Best bowling	6/84
Catches/stumpings	3/–
- Source: CricketArchive, 30 April 2025

Howard Hugh Watt (1 March 1911 – 17 August 2005) was the last surviving pre-war Springbok and part of the South African rugby team nicknamed "The Invincibles". Nicknamed Sparkle, he was both a cricketer and rugby player.

== Early life ==
Watt was born in Rosebank, Cape Town and educated at Bishops. At school he did not play for the school's first rugby team and in 1928 he went to the United States where he joined a bank and then worked for the Quaker Oats Company in Chicago. While living in Chicago, he became involved in promoting rugby union and cricket in the area.

== Cricket career ==
An Australian cricket team, with a young Don Bradman in the team, toured the US and Canada. Watt, playing for an Illinois XI, bowled Sir Donald Bradman twice in one match in Chicago in 1932 as a fast bowler. When Howard Watt met him again in 1937, Bradman remembered him as one of the few people to dismiss him so cheaply.

In 1934 he returned to South Africa and started playing first-class cricket for Western Province, for whom he opened bowling. He played in six matches for Western Province with a best return of 6–84 for Western Province against Griqualand West in Kimberley in 1934/35. In 1938 he moved to the Transvaal area and played for North Eastern Transvaal. In 1928, Watt played against the England touring team and took 2–59, including the wickets of Len Hutton and Eddie Paynter.

== Rugby union career ==
In 1934, Watt also joined Villagers and was chosen for Western Province in 1935 and was a member of the 1936 Currie Cup winning team.

He was a member of the 1937 Springbok touring team to Australia and New Zealand and although he participated in seven tour games he did not play a test match.

== See also ==
- List of South Africa national rugby union players – Springbok no. 260
