= Colin Beck =

Colin Beck may refer to:

- Colin Beck (diplomat) (born 1964), Solomon Islands diplomat
- Colin Beck (rugby union) (born 1959), South African rugby union player
