= Andries Bekker =

South African rugby union player

- Born: 5 December 1983 (age 42) Goodwood, Cape Town, South Africa
- Height: 2.08 m (6 ft 10 in)
- Weight: 121 kg (267 lb)
- School: Paul Roos Gymnasium
- University: University of South Africa
- Notable relative: Hennie Bekker (father)
- Occupation: Professional rugby player

Rugby union career
- Position: Lock
Provincial / State sides
Years	Team	Apps	(Points)
2004–2012	Western Province	38	(60)
2013–2018	Kobelco Steelers	42	(70)
- Correct as of 15 January 2017
Super Rugby
Years	Team	Apps	(Points)
2005–2013	Stormers	104	(75)
- Correct as of 2 June 2013
International career
Years	Team	Apps	(Points)
2008–2012	South Africa	29	(5)
- Correct as of 14 April 2013

Andries Bekker (born 5 December 1983 in Cape Town, South Africa) is a former South African rugby union player for the Springbok rugby team as well as Kobelco Steelers in the Japanese Top League.

== Playing career ==
Bekker made his South African debut in 2008 against Wales in a 43–17 victory in Bloemfontein.

At 6'11" he is one of the tallest international rugby players, but he only made the Springbok side regularly after the retirement of locks Bakkies Botha and Victor Matfield. He is the son of former Springbok International Hennie Bekker who was also a lock.

He held the record for being the tallest Springbok in history.

In 2013 Bekker agreed to a move to Japanese club Kobelco Steelers. He announced his retirement in January 2018.

== Accolades ==
Bekker was a Vodacom Super 14 Rugby Player of the Year nominee in 2008.
