= 2023 Currie Cup First Division =

Domestic rugby union competition

- Countries: South Africa
- Date: 11 February – 24 June
- Champions: Boland Cavaliers (6th title)

The 2023 Currie Cup First Division is the 85th edition of the Currie Cup. As the second-tier of the competition, it runs alongside the 2023 Currie Cup Premier Division. It is sponsored by beer brand Carling Black Label and organised by the South African Rugby Union.

The tournament will be played from February to June in a single round-robin format, following the realignment of the South African domestic rugby union calendar to dovetail with the northern hemisphere and the United Rugby Championship, which features four South African sides.

The competition ran concurrently with the Mzansi Challenge, which, in addition to the six South African sides, featured four additional international sides; the Welwitschias from Namibia, the Zimbabwe Goshawks, the Simbas from Kenya and the San Clemente Rhinos from the USA. Initially, the Tel Aviv Heat from Israel were due to play. However, after pressure from the South African BDS, SARU withdrew their invitation to the Heat, who were replaced by the Rhinos.

Heat accused SARU of discrimination and took the case to World Rugby, who ruled that the withdrawal of the invitation was not discriminatory.

The top South African side in the 2023 Currie Cup First Division will be promoted to the Premier Division for 2024, forming an eight team competition. The 2023 Currie Cup Premier Division began in January and was completed in June.

South Western District Eagles and the Valke qualified for the Mzansi Challenge final, with the Valke winning 55-38 and taking their first title since 2006.

Boland Cavaliers and the Valke qualified for the Currie Cup First Division final, with Boland winning 43–21.

== Teams ==
Location of teams in the 2023 Currie Cup First Division - not including the international Mzansi Challenge participants

The ten competing teams are:

2023 Currie Cup First Division/Mzansi Challenge
| Team | Sponsored name |
|---|---|
| Boland Cavaliers | Boland Kavaliers |
| Border Bulldogs | Border Bulldogs |
| Eastern Province Elephants | Eastern Province Elephants |
| Leopards | Leopards |
| San Clemente Rhinos | San Clemente Rhinos |
| Simbas | Simbas |
| SWD Eagles | SWD Eagles |
| Valke | Valke |
| Welwitschias | Windhoek Draught Welwitschias |
| Zimbabwe Goshawks | Zimbabwe Goshawks |

== Regular season ==
=== Standings - Mzansi Challenge ===
2023 Mzansi Challenge standings
| Pos | Team | Pld | W | D | L | PF | PA | PD | TF | TA | TB | LB | Pts | Qualification |
|---|---|---|---|---|---|---|---|---|---|---|---|---|---|---|
| 1 | Valke | 9 | 8 | 0 | 1 | 323 | 208 | +115 | 48 | 29 | 9 | 0 | 41 | Semifinals |
| 2 | SWD Eagles | 9 | 8 | 0 | 1 | 223 | 174 | +49 | 31 | 23 | 8 | 0 | 40 | Semifinals |
| 3 | Boland Cavaliers | 9 | 7 | 0 | 2 | 232 | 146 | +86 | 34 | 17 | 8 | 0 | 36 | Semifinals |
| 4 | Leopards | 9 | 5 | 0 | 4 | 190 | 170 | +20 | 24 | 23 | 6 | 0 | 26 | Semifinals |
| 5 | Eastern Province Elephants | 9 | 5 | 0 | 4 | 191 | 211 | −20 | 23 | 28 | 5 | 0 | 25 | |
| 6 | San Clemente Rhinos | 9 | 4 | 0 | 5 | 209 | 226 | −17 | 30 | 34 | 8 | 0 | 24 | |
| 7 | Welwitschias | 9 | 3 | 0 | 6 | 241 | 274 | −33 | 32 | 35 | 5 | 0 | 17 | |
| 8 | Simbas | 9 | 2 | 0 | 7 | 135 | 119 | +16 | 20 | 17 | 4 | 0 | 12 | |
| 9 | Border Bulldogs | 9 | 2 | 0 | 7 | 197 | 352 | −155 | 27 | 51 | 4 | 0 | 12 | |
| 10 | Zimbabwe Goshawks | 9 | 1 | 0 | 8 | 106 | 167 | −61 | 14 | 26 | 4 | 0 | 8 | |

Updated to match(es) played on 17 June 2023. Source: springboks.rugby
Rules for classification: Tournament points in the standings were awarded to teams as follows:
- 4 points for a win.
- 2 points for a draw.
- 1 bonus point for a loss in a match by seven points or under.
- 1 bonus point for scoring four tries or more.
Teams were ranked in the standings firstly by tournament points then by: (a) points difference from all matches (points scored less points conceded); (b) tries difference from all matches (tries scored less tries conceded); (c) points difference from the matches between the tied teams; (d) points scored in all matches; (e) tries scored in all matches; and, if needed, (f) a coin toss.

=== Standings - Currie Cup First Division ===
2023 Currie Cup First Division standings
| Pos | Team | Pld | W | D | L | PF | PA | PD | TF | TA | TB | LB | Pts | Qualification |
|---|---|---|---|---|---|---|---|---|---|---|---|---|---|---|
| 1 | Boland Cavaliers | 10 | 7 | 0 | 3 | 355 | 197 | +158 | 53 | 24 | 10 | 0 | 38 | Final |
| 2 | Valke | 10 | 7 | 0 | 3 | 390 | 300 | +90 | 55 | 42 | 10 | 0 | 38 | Final |
| 3 | SWD Eagles | 10 | 6 | 0 | 4 | 328 | 252 | +76 | 48 | 32 | 9 | 0 | 33 | |
| 4 | Eastern Province Elephants | 10 | 7 | 0 | 3 | 264 | 251 | +13 | 0 | 0 | 5 | 0 | 33 | |
| 5 | Leopards | 10 | 3 | 0 | 7 | 255 | 288 | −33 | 0 | 0 | 6 | 0 | 18 | |
| 6 | Border Bulldogs | 10 | 0 | 0 | 10 | 172 | 476 | −304 | 0 | 0 | 2 | 0 | 2 | |

Updated to match(es) played on 17 June 2023. Source: springboks.rugby
Rules for classification: Tournament points in the standings were awarded to teams as follows:
- 4 points for a win.
- 2 points for a draw.
- 1 bonus point for a loss in a match by seven points or under.
- 1 bonus point for scoring four tries or more.
Teams were ranked in the standings firstly by tournament points then by: (a) points difference from all matches (points scored less points conceded); (b) tries difference from all matches (tries scored less tries conceded); (c) points difference from the matches between the tied teams; (d) points scored in all matches; (e) tries scored in all matches; and, if needed, (f) a coin toss.

== Play-offs: Mzansi Challenge ==
On the eve of the playoffs, South Western Districts Eagles threatened to pull out of their semifinal, disputing the decision to award the Valke points after they refused to play against the San Clemente Rhinos.

=== Semifinals ===
| 10 June 2023 | Valke | 57–30 | Leopards | Barnard Stadium |
| 15:00 |

| 10 June 2023 | SWD Eagles | 37–20 | Boland Cavaliers | Outeniqua Park |
| 15:00 |

=== Final ===
| 17 June 2023 | Valke | 55–38 | SWD Eagles | Barnard Stadium |
| 12.30 |

== Play-offs: Currie Cup First Division ==
=== Final ===
| 24 June 2023 | Boland Cavaliers | 43–21 | Valke | Boland Stadium |
| 13.00 |

== See also ==
- 2023 Currie Cup Premier Division
