= 1972 Currie Cup =

Domestic rugby union competition

- Countries: South Africa
- Champions: Transvaal (6th title)
- Runners-up: Eastern Transvaal

The 1972 Currie Cup was the 34th edition of the Currie Cup, the premier annual domestic rugby union competition in South Africa.

The tournament was won by Transvaal for the sixth time; they beat Eastern Transvaal 25–19 in the final in Springs.

== Fixtures and Results ==
=== Final ===
1972	Eastern Transvaal	19 - 25	Transvaal	Pam Brink, Springs
				Referee: Piet Robbertse

== See also ==
- Currie Cup
