= 2023 Currie Cup Premier Division =

Domestic rugby union competition

- Countries: South Africa
- Date: 10 March – 24 June
- Champions: Free State Cheetahs (7th title)
- Runners-up: Pumas
- Matches played: 56
- Tries scored: 406 (average 7.3 per match)
- Top point scorer: Tinus de Beer (126)
- Top try scorer: Gideon van der Merwe, David Kriel, Fez Mbatha, Devon Williams (7)

The 2023 Currie Cup Premier Division was the 85th edition of the Currie Cup, the premier domestic rugby union competition in South Africa. The competition was sponsored by beer brand Carling Black Label and organised by the South African Rugby Union.

The tournament was played from Friday 10 March 2023 to Saturday 24 June 2023. This follows the realignment of the South African domestic rugby union calendar to dovetail with the northern hemisphere and the United Rugby Championship, which features four South African sides.

The Free State Cheetahs won the tournament final 25-17 against the Pumas to claim their 7th overall Currie Cup title

The competition featured an increased eight teams this season, with Griffons earning promotion into the Currie Cup Premier Division, after winning the 2022 Currie Cup First Division.

== Teams ==
Team locations in the 2023 Currie Cup Premier Division

The eight competing teams are:

2023 Currie Cup Premier Division
Team	Sponsored name	Stadium	Capacity
Blue Bulls	Vodacom Blue Bulls	Loftus Versfeld, Pretoria	51,762
Free State Cheetahs	Toyota Free State Cheetahs	Free State Stadium, Bloemfontein	48,000
Golden Lions	Sigma Golden Lions	Ellis Park Stadium, Johannesburg; Wits Rugby Stadium, Johannesburg	62,567; 5,000
Griffons	Novavit Griffons	North West Stadium, Welkom	17,000
Griquas	Tafel Lager Griquas	Griqua Park, Kimberley	11,000
Pumas	Airlink Pumas	Mbombela Stadium, Mbombela	40,929
Sharks	Cell C Sharks	Kings Park Stadium, Durban	54,000
Western Province	DHL Western Province	Cape Town Stadium, Cape Town; Danie Craven Stadium, Stellenbosch	55,000; 16,000

== Regular season ==
=== Standings ===
2023 Currie Cup Premier Division standings
Pos	Team	Pld	W	D	L	PF	PA	PD	TF	TA	B	Pts	Qualification
1	Free State Cheetahs	14	9	1	4	439	324	+115	63	39	13	51	Semifinals
2	Sharks	14	10	0	4	370	310	+60	50	37	8	48	Semifinals
3	Pumas	14	8	0	6	436	292	+144	58	38	8	40	Semifinals
4	Blue Bulls	14	7	0	7	399	415	−16	57	53	10	38	Semifinals
5	Western Province	14	7	0	7	377	335	+42	49	47	9	37	
6	Golden Lions	14	6	0	8	386	390	−4	52	51	12	36	
7	Griquas	14	7	1	6	364	399	−35	45	53	5	35	
8	Griffons	14	1	0	13	288	594	−306	33	89	6	10	

Source: springboks.rugby

Tournament points in the standings were awarded to teams as follows:

- 4 points for a win.
- 2 points for a draw.
- 1 bonus point for a loss in a match by seven points or under.
- 1 bonus point for scoring four tries or more.

Teams were ranked in the standings by tournament points. Had two or more teams tied on points the tie would have been broken by: (a) points difference from all matches (points scored less points conceded); (b) tries difference from all matches (tries scored less tries conceded); (c) points difference from the matches between the tied teams; (d) points scored in all matches; (e) tries scored in all matches; and, if needed, (f) a coin toss.

== Fixtures ==
=== Round 1 ===
10 March 2023	Griquas	19–42	Free State Cheetahs	Griqua Park, Kimberley

11 March 2023	Sharks	32–16	Griffons	Kings Park Stadium, Durban

11 March 2023	Golden Lions	28–44	Western Province	Ellis Park, Johannesburg

12 March 2023	Blue Bulls	15–63	Pumas	Loftus Versfeld, Pretoria
	Try: Mihlali Mosi; Cornal Hendricks; Con: Morne Steyn; Pen: Morne Steyn	Report	Try: Eduan Swart; Giovan Snyman; Sebastian de Klerk; Jade Stighling; Devon Williams; Andre Fouche; Diego Appollis (2); Francois Kleinhans; Con: Tinus de Beer (4); Giovan Snyman; Brandon Thomson; Pen: Tinus de Beer (2)

=== Round 2 ===
17 March 2023	Pumas	34–27	Golden Lions	Mbombela Stadium, Nelspruit

17 March 2023	Blue Bulls	33–41	Western Province	Loftus Versfeld, Pretoria
		Report

19 March 2023	Griffons	12–52	Free State Cheetahs	North West Stadium, Welkom

19 March 2023	Griquas	48–40	Sharks	Griqua Park, Kimberley

=== Round 3 ===
24 March 2023	Golden Lions	41–26	Griffons	Ellis Park, Johannesburg

24 March 2023	Free State Cheetahs	32–7	Blue Bulls	Free State Stadium, Bloemfontein
		Report

24 March 2023	Pumas	28–13	Griquas	Mbombela Stadium, Nelspruit

26 March 2023	Sharks	20–7	Western Province	Kings Park Stadium, Durban

=== Round 4 ===
31 March 2023	Griffons	32–28	Blue Bulls	North West Stadium, Welkom
		Report

31 March 2023	Free State Cheetahs	21–61	Pumas	Free State Stadium, Bloemfontein

1 April 2023	Golden Lions	34–22	Sharks	Ellis Park, Johannesburg

1 April 2023	Western Province	13–32	Griquas	Cape Town Stadium, Cape Town

=== Round 5 ===
7 April 2023	Blue Bulls	40–3	Griquas	Loftus Versfeld, Pretoria

7 April 2023	Sharks	19–12	Pumas	Kings Park Stadium, Durban

8 April 2023	Western Province	47–28	Griffons	Cape Town Stadium, Cape Town

9 April 2023	Golden Lions	15–52	Free State Cheetahs	Ellis Park, Johannesburg

=== Round 6 ===
14 April 2023	Sharks	20–24	Blue Bulls	Kings Park Stadium, Durban

15 April 2023	Western Province	17–26	Free State Cheetahs	Cape Town Stadium, Cape Town

16 April 2023	Griffons	6–64	Pumas	North West Stadium, Welkom

16 April 2023	Golden Lions	18–25	Griquas	Ellis Park, Johannesburg

=== Round 7 ===
21 April 2023	Free State Cheetahs	17–24	Sharks	Free State Stadium, Bloemfontein

21 April 2023	Pumas	25–24	Western Province	Mbombela Stadium, Nelspruit

22 April 2023	Blue Bulls	30–19	Golden Lions	Loftus Versfeld, Pretoria

23 April 2023	Griquas	42–27	Griffons	Griqua Park, Kimberley

=== Round 8 ===
28 April 2023	Golden Lions	26–10	Pumas	Ellis Park, Johannesburg

28 April 2023	Free State Cheetahs	33–10	Griffons	Free State Stadium, Bloemfontein

29 April 2023	Sharks	24–6	Griquas	Kings Park Stadium, Durban

29 April 2023	Western Province	31–7	Blue Bulls	Cape Town Stadium, Cape Town

=== Round 9 ===
5 May 2023	Griquas	25–21	Golden Lions	Griqua Park, Kimberley

6 May 2023	Pumas	45–25	Griffons	Mbombela Stadium, Nelspruit

6 May 2023	Free State Cheetahs	26–21	Western Province	Free State Stadium, Bloemfontein

6 May 2023	Blue Bulls	27–41	Sharks	Loftus Versfeld, Pretoria

=== Round 10 ===
12 May 2023	Griffons	21–25	Western Province	North West Stadium, Welkom

12 May 2023	Pumas	22–24	Sharks	Mbombela Stadium, Nelspruit

13 May 2023	Free State Cheetahs	26–33	Golden Lions	Free State Stadium, Bloemfontein

13 May 2023	Griquas	20–40	Blue Bulls	Griqua Park, Kimberley

=== Round 11 ===
19 May 2023	Western Province	22–14	Pumas	Athlone Stadium, Cape Town

19 May 2023	Sharks	35–23	Free State Cheetahs	Kings Park Stadium, Durban

20 May 2023	Griffons	21–47	Griquas	North West Stadium, Welkom

20 May 2023	Golden Lions	32–33	Blue Bulls	Ellis Park, Johannesburg

=== Round 12 ===
26 May 2023	Griffons	9–35	Sharks	North West Stadium, Welkom

26 May 2023	Western Province	12–32	Golden Lions	Athlone Stadium, Cape Town

27 May 2023	Free State Cheetahs	29–29	Griquas	Free State Stadium, Bloemfontein

27 May 2023	Pumas	17–24	Blue Bulls	Mbombela Stadium, Nelspruit

=== Round 13 ===
2 June 2023	Griquas	38–29	Western Province	Griqua Park, Kimberley

2 June 2023	Blue Bulls	64–33	Griffons	Loftus Versfeld, Pretoria
		Report

3 June 2023	Pumas	14–29	Free State Cheetahs	Mbombela Stadium, Nelspruit

3 June 2023	Sharks	29–21	Golden Lions	Kings Park Stadium, Durban

=== Round 14 ===
9 June 2023	Griquas	17–27	Pumas	Griqua Park, Kimberley

9 June 2023	Griffons	22–39	Golden Lions	North West Stadium, Welkom

10 June 2023	Blue Bulls	27–31	Free State Cheetahs	Loftus Versfeld, Pretoria

10 June 2023	Western Province	44–5	Sharks	Cape Town Stadium, Cape Town

== Play-offs ==
=== Semifinals ===
17 June 2023	Free State Cheetahs	37–10	Blue Bulls	Free State Stadium, Bloemfontein
15:00

17 June 2023	Sharks	20–26	Pumas	Kings Park Stadium, Durban
17:30

=== Final ===
24 June 2023	Free State Cheetahs	25–17	Pumas	Free State Stadium, Bloemfontein
	Try: Fortuin 28'; Jasper 37'; Kruger 51'; Con: Pienaar (2) 38',52'; Pen: Pienaar (2) 5',20'		Try: Mgijima 33'; Pen: de Beer (4) 18',23',42',46'	Attendance: 33,804

== See also ==
- 2023 Currie Cup First Division
