= Colin Beck (rugby union) =

South African rugby union footballer (born 1959)

- Born: Jacobus Johannes Beck; 27 March 1959 (age 67) Strand, Western Cape, South Africa
- Height: 1.80 m (5 ft 11 in)
- Weight: 82 kg (181 lb)
- School: Strand High School, Strand, Western Cape
- University: Stellenbosch University

Rugby union career
- Position(s): Fullback, Fly-half, Centre
Amateur team(s)
Years	Team	Apps	(Points)
1977–1981, 1985	Stellenbosch University		
1982–1983	Defence		
Provincial / State sides
Years	Team	Apps	(Points)
1980–1985	Western Province	44	(364)
International career
Years	Team	Apps	(Points)
1981	South Africa	3	(4)

Jacobus Johannes 'Colin' Beck (born 27 March 1959) is a South African former rugby union player.

== Playing career ==
=== Provincial career ===
Beck started his career at the University of Stellenbosch in 1977 when he played for the Maties under–19 side. He made his senior provincial debut in April 1980 for Western Province as a replacement against the touring South American Jaguars. Beck had a very successful 1982 season, when he was the top scorer in all provincial matches in South Africa with 225 points and in the Currie Cup with 149 points. As a result of his performance he was nominated for Player of the Year. Beck suffered a severe knee injury in 1983, which kept him out of rugby for more than a year. On his return in 1985 he struggled to regain his previous form and his last provincial match was on 18 May 1985 against Transvaal at Newlands.

=== International career ===
Beck was first selected for the Springboks to tour New Zealand in 1981. He made his test debut for the Springboks as a replacement for Willie du Plessis at half time in the second test on 29 August 1981 at Athletic Park in Wellington. In the third test he once again replaced Du Plessis in the second half. His first start in a test for the Springboks was against the USA at the Owl Creek Polo ground in Glenville, New York. Beck scored one test try and also played in 9 tour matches for the Springboks, scoring 31 points (4 tries, 3 conversions, 2 penalty goals and 1 drop goal).

== See also ==
- List of South Africa national rugby union players – Springbok no. 524
