= 1968 Currie Cup =

Domestic rugby union competition

- Countries: South Africa
- Champions: Northern Transvaal (3rd title)
- Runners-up: Transvaal

The 1968 Currie Cup was the 30th edition of the Currie Cup, the premier annual domestic rugby union competition in South Africa. It was also the first season that the Currie Cup became an annual competition, having previously been held intermittently.

The tournament was won by Northern Transvaal for the third time; they beat Transvaal 16–3 in the final in Pretoria.

== Fixtures and Results ==
=== Final ===
1954	Northern Transvaal	16 - 3	Transvaal	Loftus Versfeld, Pretoria
				Referee: Bertie Strasheim

== See also ==
- Currie Cup
