= 1954 Currie Cup =

Domestic rugby union competition

- Countries: South Africa
- Champions: Western Province (18th title)
- Runners-up: Northern Transvaal

The 1954 Currie Cup was the 25th edition of the Currie Cup, the premier domestic rugby union competition in South Africa.

The tournament was won by Western Province for the 18th time; they beat Northern Transvaal 11–8 in the final in Cape Town.

== Fixtures and Results ==
=== Semi-final ===
1954	Free State	8 - 9	Northern Transvaal	Free State Stadium, Bloemfontein

=== Final ===
1954	Western Province	11 - 8	Northern Transvaal	Newlands, Cape Town
				Referee: Ralph Burmeister

== See also ==
- Currie Cup
