= 1966 Currie Cup =

Domestic rugby union competition

- Countries: South Africa
- Champions: Western Province (21st title)

The 1966 Currie Cup was the 29th edition of the Currie Cup, the premier domestic rugby union competition in South Africa.

The tournament was won by Western Province for the 21st time.

== See also ==
- Currie Cup
