= RIOT 111 =

New Zealand political punk band

Golden Showers Gig, 1982

RIOT 111 was a New Zealand political punk band active from 1981 to 1984, often associated with anarcho-punk. The group was formed by two political activists, singer "Void" and drummer "Roger Riot", during the South Africa national rugby union team's infamous 1981 tour of New Zealand. The members of Riot 111 were Brown Squad protesters, who were involved in running battles with the police's Red Squad outside the apartheid South African rugby union games.

Void and Roger Riot recorded with guitarist Nick Swan and bassist Mark Crawford and their first song "1981" was based on the Haka of the All Blacks. It got to No. 18 in the national chart considered the 12th most important song ever written in New Zealand music history by Rocked the Nation 2009 documentary series.

International touring acts asked Riot 111 to support them at New Zealand concerts, and through 1982 they played with The Birthday Party, John Cooper Clark and The Dead Kennedys. Jello Biafra wrote extensively about Void in US punk fanzines as an icon of anti-music imperialism. Riot 111 was one of the first bands to express Oceania indigenous culture through alternative post-punk rebellion.

Riot 111's EP of illuminate was released in 1982. "Songs "Your all waiting for 1984 but we all know it’s here" The bleak reality growing Surveillance State gearing up and turning on its citizens, "Subversive radicals" a collage of the propaganda names activists were being labelled in the press. A music clip had been created to go with one of the EP's tracks, "Writing on the Wall", but it was refused airplay by state television on the only music channel. The band publicly protested the decision, as most local bands were refused airplay, outside Television New Zealand's studio in the Hutt Valley.

Subversive Radicals was followed by a tour of the South Island with a band called The First XV. This resulted in four of the eight tour members being arrested in Christchurch on the first day of arrival. They were also involved in a street battle with police outside The Star and Garter hotel, which caused the closure the hotel for the year and led to more banning of the band.

Void co-produced two nationwide punk rock concerts as alternates to the backward looking hippy music festivals most of the bands are excluded from. Capital Kaos live record was released. Such trouble with the police proved to be one factor that caused the band to fall apart. Other factors included continued violence from skinheads, Maori gangs, selfish girlfriends, the replacement of bassist Mark Crawford with Tim Ord, and a close friendship with Neil Roberts, an anarchist who died bombing a police computer database building.
