= 1957–1959 Currie Cup =

Domestic rugby union competition

- Countries: South Africa
- Champions: Western Province (19th title)

The 1957–1959 Currie Cup was the 27th edition of the Currie Cup, the premier domestic rugby union competition in South Africa. It was the first time in the tournament's history that the competition spanned multiple years.

The tournament was won by Western Province for the 19th time.

== See also ==
- Currie Cup
