= 1964 Currie Cup =

Domestic rugby union competition

- Countries: South Africa
- Champions: Western Province (20th title)

The 1964 Currie Cup was the 28th edition of the Currie Cup, the premier domestic rugby union competition in South Africa.

The tournament was won by Western Province for the 20th time.

== See also ==
- Currie Cup
