= 1898 Currie Cup =

Domestic rugby union competition

- Countries: South Africa
- Champions: Western Province (5th title)

The 1898 Currie Cup was the fifth edition of the Currie Cup, the premier annual domestic rugby union competition in South Africa.

The tournament was won by Western Province for the fifth time, who won all five of their matches in the competition.

== See also ==
- Currie Cup
