= 1950 Currie Cup =

Domestic rugby union competition

- Countries: South Africa
- Champions: Transvaal (3rd title)
- Runners-up: Western Province

The 1950 Currie Cup was the 23rd edition of the Currie Cup, the premier domestic rugby union competition in South Africa.

The tournament was won by Transvaal for the third time; they beat Western Province 22–11 in the final in Johannesburg.

== Fixtures and Results ==
=== Playoff match ===
Transvaal and Northern Transvaal ended level on 14 points each after beating all seven teams in the B Section. As a result, Transvaal and Northern Transvaal played off, Transvaal winning 17–9.

| 1946 | Northern Transvaal | 9 - 17 | Transvaal |

=== Final ===
| 30 September 1950 | Transvaal | 22–11 | Western Province | Ellis Park Stadium, Johannesburg |
| | Try: Muller; Sinclair; Van Staden; Con: Geffin (2); Pen: Geffin (2); Drop: Buchler (1) | Report | Try: Visser; Ochse (2); Con: Boyes | Attendance: 40,000 |

== See also ==
- Currie Cup
