= 1936 Currie Cup =

Domestic rugby union competition

- Countries: South Africa
- Champions: Western Province (16th title)

The 1936 Currie Cup was the 19th edition of the Currie Cup, the premier domestic rugby union competition in South Africa.

The tournament was won by Western Province for the 16th time.

== See also ==
- Currie Cup
