= 1892 Currie Cup =

Domestic rugby union competition

- Countries: South Africa
- Champions: Western Province (1st title)

The 1892 Currie Cup was the first edition of the Currie Cup, the premier domestic rugby union competition in South Africa.

The tournament was won by Western Province, who won all four of their matches in the competition, beating Border, Griqualand West, Natal and Transvaal.

== Log ==
1892 Currie Cup
Pos	Team	P	W	D	L	PF	PA	PD	Pts
1	Western Province	4	4	0	0	63	2	61	8
2	Griqualand West	4	3	0	1	51	10	41	6
3	Transvaal	3	1	0	2	28	26	2	2
4	Natal	4	1	0	3	11	69	-58	2
5	Border	3	0	0	3	0	46	-46	0
Source: rugbyarchive.net Key: P = matches played, W = Won, D = Drawn, L = Lost, PF = Points for, PA = Points against, PD = Points difference, Pts = Tournament points The top-placed team won the Currie Cup title

== Fixtures and Results ==
Source of results.

1892	Griqualand West	15 – 5	Transvaal

1892	Griqualand West	13 – 0	Border

1892	Griqualand West	21 – 0	Natal

1892	Natal	11 – 0	Border

1892	Transvaal	23 – 0	Natal

12 September 1892	Western Province	11 – 0	Transvaal	Kimberley

15 September 1892	Western Province	22 – 0	Border	Kimberley

19 September 1892	Western Province	25 – 0	Natal	Kimberley

24 September 1892	Western Province	5 – 2	Griqualand West	Kimberley

== See also ==
- Currie Cup
