= 1946 Currie Cup =

Domestic rugby union competition

- Countries: South Africa
- Champions: Northern Transvaal (1st title)
- Runners-up: Western Province

The 1946 Currie Cup was the 21st edition of the Currie Cup, the premier domestic rugby union competition in South Africa.

The tournament was won by Northern Transvaal for the first time; they beat Western Province 11–9 in the final in Pretoria.

== Tables ==
=== Northern Section ===
1946 Currie Cup
Pos	Team	P	W	D	L	PF	PA	PD	Pts
1	Western Province	6	5	0	1	90	42	+48	10
2	Eastern Province	6	4	0	2	76	58	+18	8
3	Border	6	3	1	2	63	65	-2	7
4	Boland	6	2	0	4	47	75	-28	4
5	Rhodesia	6	1	0	5	40	78	-38	2
6	South Western Districts	6	0	2	4	22	71	-49	2
7	North Eastern Districts	6	0	1	5	38	117	-79	1
Source: rugbyarchive.net Key: P = matches played, W = Won, D = Drawn, L = Lost, PF = Points for, PA = Points against, PD = Points difference, Pts = Tournament points The top-placed team advanced to the Currie Cup grand final

=== Southern Section ===
1946 Currie Cup
Pos	Team	P	W	D	L	PF	PA	PD	Pts
1	Northern Transvaal	7	7	0	0	159	50	+109	10
2	Transvaal	7	6	0	1	81	49	+32	6
3	Natal	7	3	1	3	66	68	-2	6
4	Griqualand West	7	2	2	3	92	68	+24	6
5	Western Transvaal	7	3	0	4	53	69	-16	2
6	Orange Free State	7	2	1	4	55	72	-17	0
Source: rugbyarchive.net Key: P = matches played, W = Won, D = Drawn, L = Lost, PF = Points for, PA = Points against, PD = Points difference, Pts = Tournament points The top-placed team advanced to the Currie Cup grand final

== Interdivisional Fixtures and Results ==
1946	Boland	8 - 6	Orange Free State

1946	Boland	15 - 6	Western Transvaal

1946	Border	20 - 10	Orange Free State

1946	Border	12 - 8	Natal

1946	Border	9 - 4	Western Transvaal

1946	Eastern Province	21 - 8	Natal

1946	Eastern Province	15 - 10	Orange Free State

1946	Eastern Province	14 - 6	Western Transvaal

1946	Eastern Province	17 - 11	Griqualand West

1946	Griqualand West	26 - 6	Boland

1946	Griqualand West	6 - 6	Border

1946	Griqualand West	29 - 10	North Eastern Districts

1946	Natal	13 - 6	Boland

1946	Natal	28 - 5	North Eastern Districts

1946	Natal	3 - 0	Rhodesia

1946	North Eastern Districts	3 - 3	Orange Free State

3 August 1946	Northern Transvaal	16 - 6	Eastern Province

1946	Northern Transvaal	6 - 3	Boland

1946	Northern Transvaal	26 - 10	Border

1946	Northern Transvaal	30 - 3	North Eastern Districts

20 July 1946	Northern Transvaal	28 - 6	Rhodesia

1946	Northern Transvaal	37 - 10	South Western Districts

1946	Orange Free State	14 - 9	Rhodesia

1946	Orange Free State	12 - 6	South Western Districts

1946	Rhodesia	16 - 12	Griqualand West

1946	South Western Districts	0 - 0	Griqualand West

1946	South Western Districts	3 - 3	Natal

1946	Transvaal	8 - 3	Rhodesia

1946	Transvaal	18 - 9	Boland

1946	Transvaal	11 - 6	Border

1946	Transvaal	7 - 3	Eastern Province

1946	Transvaal	16 - 11	North Eastern Districts

1946	Transvaal	13 - 0	South Western Districts

1946	Western Province	12 - 16	Northern Transvaal

1946	Western Province	13 - 8	Griqualand West

1946	Western Province	21 - 3	Natal

1946	Western Province	11 - 0	Orange Free State

1946	Western Province	17 - 8	Transvaal

1946	Western Province	16 - 7	Western Transvaal

1946	Western Transvaal	13 - 6	Rhodesia

1946	Western Transvaal	11 - 6	North Eastern Districts

1946	Western Transvaal	6 - 3	South Western Districts

=== Final ===
1946	Northern Transvaal	11 - 9	Western Province	Loftus Versfeld, Pretoria

== See also ==
- Currie Cup
