= 1985 Currie Cup =

Domestic rugby union competition

- Countries: South Africa
- Champions: Western Province (26th title)
- Runners-up: Northern Transvaal

The 1985 Currie Cup was the 47th edition of the Currie Cup, the premier annual domestic rugby union competition in South Africa.

The tournament was won by Western Province for the 26th time; they beat Northern Transvaal 22–15 in the final in Cape Town.

== See also ==
- Currie Cup
