= Valke (rugby union) =

- Full name: Valke / Falcons
- Union: Valke Rugby Union
- Emblem: Falcon
- Founded: 1947
- Region: Eastern Gauteng
- Ground(s): Barnard Stadium, Kempton Park (Capacity: 7,000)
- Coach: JP Immelman
- League(s): Currie Cup First Division; SA Cup
- 2026 CC 2026 SA: Runners-up; 3rd 6th
Team kit

Official website
- www.valke.co.za
- Current season

The Valke, sometimes known as the Falcons, are a South African rugby union team in Gauteng province that participates in the annual Currie Cup tournament.

Their home ground is Barnard Stadium in Kempton Park, to which they have returned in 2009. The Falcons have operated from Bosman Stadium in Brakpan and Pam Brink Stadium in Springs. They occasionally still host matches at Bosman Stadium. The Falcons draw players from Ekurhuleni and other municipalities to the east and south of Johannesburg.

== History ==
The Valke Rugby Union was founded in 1947 as the Eastern Transvaal Rugby Football Union. After the 1995 World Cup, rugby was declared a professional sport in South Africa, after which the Eastern Transvaal Rugby Football Union merged with the Vaal Triangle Rugby Union to form the Gauteng Valke Rugby Union. It is one of only fourteen Provincial Unions in the country.

== Honours ==
In 2006 the Valke were the Vodacom Cup champions, the first cup won in the history of the union.

- Currie cup runner-up: 1972
- Currie Cup First Division runner-up: 2005, 2014, 2018, 2023, 2025, 2026
- Vodacom cup champions: 2006
- Mzansi Challenge champions: 2023

== Valke Professional Rugby ==
Valke Rugby (Pty) Ltd is the arm responsible for the Valke Brand and the operation of the Professional Rugby Team, which competes in two high-profile competitions in South African Rugby:

- Currie Cup
- SA Cup

== Amateur Union ==
The Community Rugby arm, known historically as the Amateur Union, maintains the structure and development of the amateur Rugby set-up for the region, and includes:

- 18 Clubs (approximately 2,000 players)
- 54 High Schools
- 101 Primary Schools
- 80 registered referees
- and the structured development and transformation of Rugby in the region.

== See also ==
- Malaysia Valke
