= 1980 Currie Cup =

South African rugby union football competition

- Countries: South Africa
- Champions: Northern Transvaal (12th title)
- Runners-up: Western Province

The 1980 Currie Cup was the 42nd edition of the Currie Cup, the premier annual domestic rugby union competition in South Africa.

The tournament was won by Northern Transvaal for the 12th time; they beat Western Province 39–9 in the final in Pretoria.

== Results ==
=== Semi-finals ===
Northern Transvaal	49–6	South Eastern Transvaal	Loftus Versfeld, Pretoria
	Report

Eastern Province	13–21	Western Province	Boet Erasmus Stadium, Port Elizabeth
	Report

=== Final ===
Northern Transvaal	39–9	Western Province	Loftus Versfeld, Pretoria
	Report		Referee: Steve Strydom

== See also ==
- Currie Cup
