= 1979 Currie Cup =

Domestic rugby union competition

- Countries: South Africa
- Champions: Joint winners: Northern Transvaal (11th title); Western Province (22nd title)

The 1979 Currie Cup was the 41st edition of the Currie Cup, the premier annual domestic rugby union competition in South Africa.

The tournament was jointly won by Northern Transvaal (for the 11th time) and Western Province (for the 22nd time) after the two teams drew 15–15 in the final in Cape Town.

Northern Transvaal's Naas Botha, who played in eleven finals, finishing outside of the winning team only twice, slotted two drop goals, and Western Province's Morné du Plessis popularised the phrase 'like kissing your sister' when discussing the result afterwards.

== Results ==
=== Semi-finals ===
Eastern Province	6–16	Northern Transvaal	Boet Erasmus Stadium, Port Elizabeth
	Report

Griqualand West	15–20	Western Province	De Beers Stadium, Kimberley
	Report

=== Final ===
Western Province	15–15	Northern Transvaal	Newlands Stadium, Cape Town
	Report		Referee: Steve Strydom

== See also ==
- Currie Cup
