= Burger Geldenhuys =

South African rugby union player

- Born: Schalk Burger Geldenhuys; 18 May 1956 (age 70) Kroonstad, Free State, South Africa
- Height: 1.88 m (6 ft 2 in)
- Weight: 93 kg (205 lb)
- School: Kroonstad High School
- University: University of Pretoria

Rugby union career
Provincial / State sides
Years	Team	Apps	(Points)
1977–1989	Northern Transvaal	184	
International career
Years	Team	Apps	(Points)
1981–1989	South Africa	7	(4)

Schalk Burger Geldenhuys (born 18 May 1956) is a South African former rugby union player.

== Career ==
Throughout his career he played for only one province, Northern Transvaal. Geldenhuys played 184 matches for Northern Transvaal and also captained his province 54 times.

In total, he played in seven tests for the Springboks and scored one try. His first test was as flanker on 29 August 1981 against the All Blacks at Athletic Park, Wellington. His seventh and final test occurred on 2 September 1989 against a World XV side at Ellis Park, Johannesburg.

=== Test history ===
No.	Opposition	Result (SA 1st)	Position	Tries	Date	Venue
1.	New Zealand	24–12	Flank		29 August 1981	Athletic Park, Wellington
2.	New Zealand	22–25	Flank		12 September 1981	Eden Park, Auckland
3.	United States	38–7	Flank	1	20 September 1981	Owl Creek Polo ground, Glenville, New York
4.	South American Jaguars	50–18	Flank		27 March 1982	Loftus Versveld, Pretoria
5.	South American Jaguars	12–21	Flank		3 April 1982	Free State Stadium, Bloemfontein
6.	World XV	20–19	Flank		26 August 1989	Newlands, Cape Town
7.	World XV	22–16	Flank		2 September 1989	Ellis Park, Johannesburg

== Accolades ==
He was inducted into the University of Pretoria sport hall of fame.

== See also ==
- List of South Africa national rugby union players – Springbok no. 528
