= Barnard Stadium =

Sports stadium in Kempton Park, South Africa

- Interactive map of Barnard Stadium
- Location: Kempton Park, South Africa
- Coordinates: 26.10496°S 28.21365°E
- Capacity: 7,000
- Surface: Grass

Tenants
- Falcons Rugby (Pty) Ltd, Red Sox Baseball Club

Barnard Stadium is a sports stadium situated in Kempton Park, South Africa. It is the home of the Falcons Rugby Union team.

The stadium is situated next to the Kempton Park Golf Club, and has a small grand stand and flood lighting.
