= Currie Cup =

South Africa's premier domestic rugby union competition

- Current season or competition: 2026 Currie Cup Premier Division
- Sport: Rugby union
- Instituted: 1891
- Inaugural season: 1892
- Number of teams: Premier Division: 8 First Division: 6
- Country: South Africa
- Holders: Griquas (2026)
- Most titles: Western Province (34) Four shared (4)
- Broadcast partner: SuperSport; SABC 2 FloSports; Sky Sports; Stan; RugbyPass; Star+
- Related competition: SA Cup

The Currie Cup (Afrikaans: Curriebeker) is South Africa's premier domestic rugby union competition featuring teams representing either entire provinces or substantial regions within provinces. The Currie Cup dates back to 1891.

== History ==
The Currie Cup is one of the oldest rugby competitions, with the first games played in 1889, although it was only in 1892 that it became officially known as the Currie Cup. The competition had its humble beginnings as an inter-province competition in 1884, but when the South African Rugby Board was founded in 1889 it decided to organize a national competition that would involve representative teams from all the major unions. The original participating unions were Western Province, Griqualand West, Transvaal and Eastern Province. The first tournament was held in Kimberley and was won by Western Province. For a prize they received a silver cup donated by the South African Rugby Board, now displayed at the SA Rugby Museum in Cape Town. The story of how the Currie Cup came to be comes from the first overseas rugby team to tour South Africa in 1891, The British Isles, who carried with them a particularly precious bit of cargo. Among the bags, boots and balls was a golden cup given to them by Sir Donald Currie, owner of Union-Castle Lines, the shipping company that transported them to the southern tip of Africa. Sir Donald was clear with his instructions – hand this trophy over to the team in South Africa that gives the best game; and after a spirited display where the unbeaten British Lions narrowly won 3–0, Griqualand West became the first ever holders of the Currie Cup. They then handed the trophy over to the South African rugby board and it became the floating trophy for the Currie Cup competition. The inaugural Currie Cup tournament was thus held in 1892 with Western Province earning the honour of holding it aloft as the first official winners.

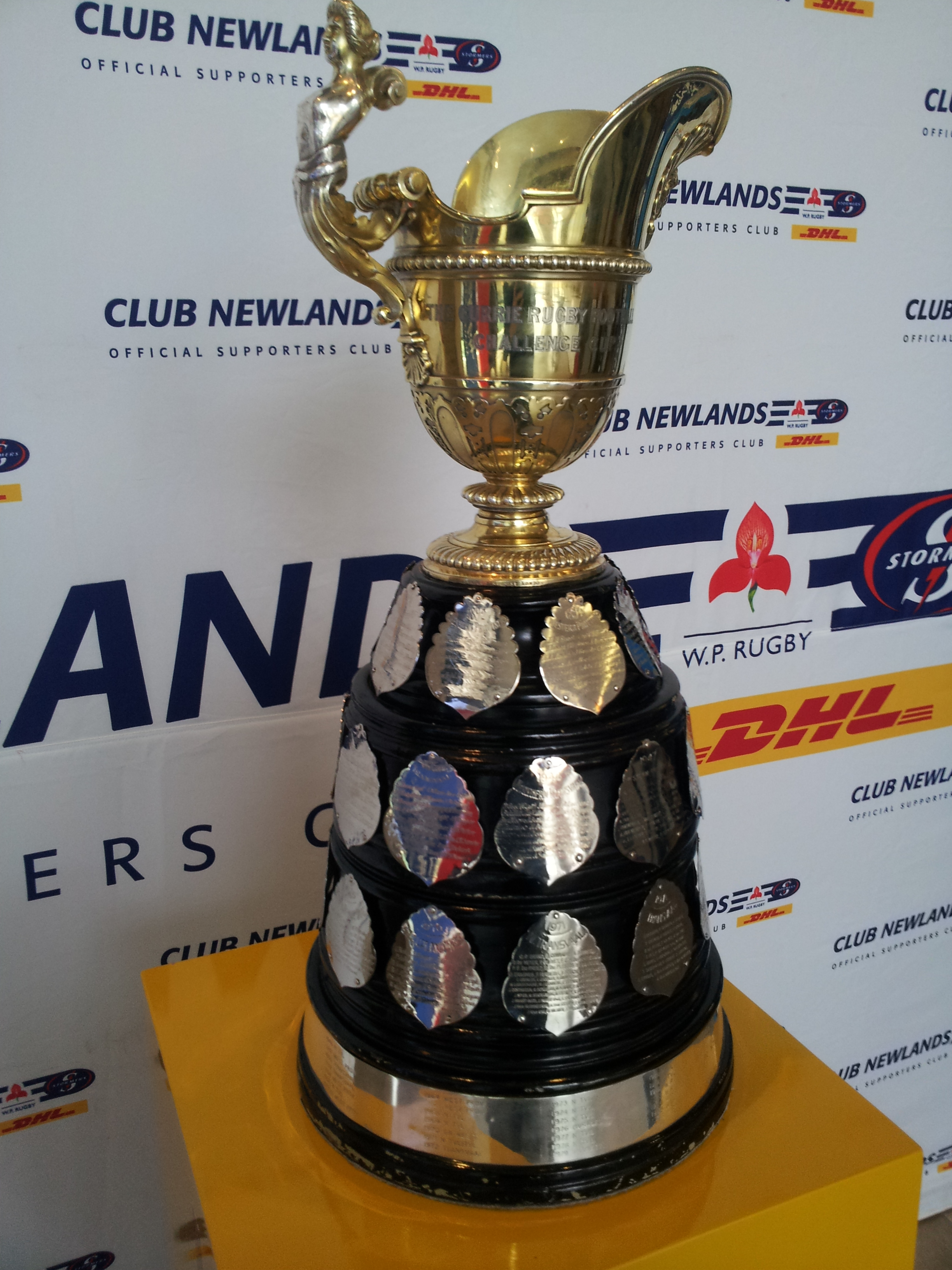
The Currie Cup trophy

Western Province dominated the competition's early years, and by 1920 the team from Cape Town had already secured the trophy 10 times. Only Griqualand West could halt the rampant WP side and win the trophy in 1899 and 1911. In 1922 the Transvaal won the competition for the first time, however Western Province would continue to dominate the Currie Cup throughout the 1920s and 1930s, winning the trophy a further 4 times and sharing it twice with Border. In 1939 the trophy returned to Johannesburg for only the second time after Transvaal defeated Western Province in Cape Town. This was the first time WP had lost a final at their home ground Newlands. The Currie Cup went into hiatus during the Second World War but resumed in 1946 when Northern Transvaal claimed their first ever trophy by beating Western Province 11–9 in the final at Loftus Versfeld in Pretoria. The late 1940s and early 1950s were dominated by Transvaal who would win the trophy in 1950 and 1952, however in 1954 the Currie Cup would finally return south following Western Province's narrow 11–8 victory over Northern Transvaal in the final at Newlands in Cape Town. The competition missed a few years here for reasons such as war and the like, but in 1968 it became a fully fledged annual showpiece.

At the end of the apartheid 1980s, South African rugby supporters were treated to two of the most memorable Currie Cup finals. In 1989 winger Carel du Plessis scored a last-minute try as WP managed to draw with Northern Transvaal 16-all, Riaan Gouws missed the conversion which would have given WP its 6th title of the decade a feat which has never been achieved. The following year the Blue Bulls slipped up, though, and Natal sneaked home 18–12, inspired by fly-half Joel Stransky. The 1990s saw further improvement by Natal and the rise of Francois Pienaar's Transvaal. Since the end of apartheid in 1990–4, and the age of professionalism in rugby union in the early 1990s, the Currie Cup has become much more competitive with no team able to carve out an era of dominance like that of WP in the early years or Northern Transvaal in the 1970s and 1980s.

In order to adjust to the European competition calendar, from the 2024 season the Currie Cup takes place in a new window between July and late September.

== Teams ==
=== Current Teams ===
Map of South Africa displaying the borders of the 14 teams in the Currie Cup

Currie Cup teams
Team	Home base	Region	Last appearance in Premier Division
Boland Cavaliers	Wellington	Northern and central districts of the Western Cape province	2026
Border Bulldogs	East London	Eastern districts of the Eastern Cape province	1999
Bulls XV (Note: Formerly the Blue Bulls.)	Pretoria	The Pretoria metropolitan area and Limpopo province	2026
Cheetahs (Note: Formerly the Free State Cheetahs.)	Bloemfontein	Central and western districts of the Free State province	2026
Eastern Province Elephants	Gqeberha	Western districts of the Eastern Cape province	2016
Griffons	Welkom	Northern and eastern districts of the Free State province	2024
Griquas	Kimberley	Northern Cape province	2026
Leopards	Potchefstroom	North West province	2011
Lions (Note: Formerly the Golden Lions.)	Johannesburg	Johannesburg and the West Rand	2026
Pumas	Mbombela	Mpumalanga province	2026
Sharks XV	Durban	KwaZulu-Natal province	2026
Stormers XXIII (Note: Formerly Western Province.)	Cape Town	Cape Town metropolitan area	2026
SWD Eagles	George	Eastern districts of the Western Cape province	2004
Valke (Note: Sometimes known by their English name, the Falcons.)	Kempton Park	The East Rand and other municipalities to the east and south of Johannesburg	2008

=== Former Teams ===
Currie Cup teams
Team	Home base	Region	Last appearance
(Georgia (country)) Black Lion	Tbilisi	Georgia	2022
(Argentina) Jaguares XV	Buenos Aires	Argentina	2019
(United States) San Clemente Rhinos	San Clemente	California, United States of America	2023 (Note: Only played in Mzansi Challenge.)
(Kenya) Simbas	Nairobi	Kenya	2023
(Namibia) Welwitschias	Windhoek	Namibia	2023
Zimbabwe Goshawks	Harare	Zimbabwe	2023

== Champions and finals ==
Between 1892 and 1920, the competition was held as a centralised tournament, with the team with the best record crowned as the winner. Between 1922 and 1936 (as well as in three tournaments between 1957 and 1966), the winner was the team with the best record following a round-robin competition. In all the other seasons, a final was played to determine the champion.

=== Currie Cup ===
Currie Cup Champions and Finals Results
Season	Champions	Runner-Up	Score	Final Venue
1892	Western Province	—N/a	—N/a	—N/a
1894	Western Province	—N/a	—N/a	—N/a
1895	Western Province	—N/a	—N/a	—N/a
1897	Western Province	—N/a	—N/a	—N/a
1898	Western Province	—N/a	—N/a	—N/a
1899^{1}	Griqualand West	—N/a	—N/a	—N/a
1904	Western Province	—N/a	—N/a	—N/a
1906	Western Province	—N/a	—N/a	—N/a
1908	Western Province	—N/a	—N/a	—N/a
1911	Griqualand West	—N/a	—N/a	—N/a
1914	Western Province	—N/a	—N/a	—N/a
1920	Western Province	—N/a	—N/a	—N/a
1922	Transvaal	—N/a	—N/a	—N/a
1925	Western Province	—N/a	—N/a	—N/a
1927	Western Province	—N/a	—N/a	—N/a
1929	Western Province	—N/a	—N/a	—N/a
1932	Border & Western Province (shared)	—N/a	—N/a	—N/a
1934	Border & Western Province (shared)	—N/a	—N/a	—N/a
1936	Western Province	—N/a	—N/a	—N/a
1939	Transvaal	Western Province	17–6	Newlands Stadium, Cape Town
1946	Northern Transvaal	Western Province	11–9	Loftus Versfeld, Pretoria
1947	Western Province	Transvaal	16–12	Newlands Stadium, Cape Town
1950	Transvaal	Western Province	22–11	Ellis Park Stadium, Johannesburg
1952	Transvaal	Boland	11–9	Wellington
1954	Western Province	Northern Transvaal	11–8	Newlands Stadium, Cape Town
1956	Northern Transvaal	Natal	9–8	Kings Park Stadium, Durban
1957–1959^{2}	Western Province	—N/a	—N/a	—N/a
1964	Western Province	—N/a	—N/a	—N/a
1966	Western Province	—N/a	—N/a	—N/a
1968	Northern Transvaal	Transvaal	16–3	Loftus Versfeld, Pretoria
1969	Northern Transvaal	Western Province	28–13	Loftus Versfeld, Pretoria
1970	Griqualand West	Northern Transvaal	11–9	De Beers, Kimberley
1971	Northern Transvaal & Transvaal (shared)	—N/a	14–14	Ellis Park Stadium, Johannesburg
1972	Transvaal	Eastern Transvaal	25–19	Pam Brink Stadium, Springs
1973	Northern Transvaal	Free State	30–22	Loftus Versfeld, Pretoria
1974	Northern Transvaal	Transvaal	17–15	Loftus Versfeld, Pretoria
1975	Northern Transvaal	Free State	12–6	Free State Stadium, Bloemfontein
1976	Free State	Western Province	33–16	Free State Stadium, Bloemfontein
1977	Northern Transvaal	Free State	27–12	Loftus Versfeld, Pretoria
1978	Northern Transvaal	Free State	13–9	Free State Stadium, Bloemfontein
1979	Northern Transvaal & Western Province (shared)	—N/a	15–15	Newlands Stadium, Cape Town
1980	Northern Transvaal	Western Province	39–9	Loftus Versfeld, Pretoria
1981	Northern Transvaal	Free State	23–6	Loftus Versfeld, Pretoria
1982	Western Province	Northern Transvaal	24–7	Newlands Stadium, Cape Town
1983	Western Province	Northern Transvaal	9–3	Loftus Versfeld, Pretoria
1984	Western Province	Natal	19–9	Newlands Stadium, Cape Town
1985	Western Province	Northern Transvaal	22–15	Newlands Stadium, Cape Town
1986	Western Province	Transvaal	22–9	Newlands Stadium, Cape Town
1987	Northern Transvaal	Transvaal	24–18	Ellis Park Stadium, Johannesburg
1988	Northern Transvaal	Western Province	19–18	Loftus Versfeld, Pretoria
1989	Northern Transvaal & Western Province (shared)	—N/a	16–16	Newlands Stadium, Cape Town
1990	Natal	Northern Transvaal	18–12	Loftus Versfeld, Pretoria
1991	Northern Transvaal	Transvaal	27–15	Loftus Versfeld, Pretoria
1992	Natal	Transvaal	14–13	Ellis Park Stadium, Johannesburg
1993	Transvaal	Natal	21–15	Kings Park Stadium, Durban
1994	Transvaal	Free State	56–33	Springbok Park, Bloemfontein
1995	Natal	Western Province	25–17	Kings Park Stadium, Durban
1996	Sharks^{6}	Golden Lions^{3}	33–15	Ellis Park Stadium, Johannesburg
1997	Western Province	Free State Cheetahs^{4}	14–12	Newlands Stadium, Cape Town
1998	Blue Bulls^{5}	Western Province	24–20	Loftus Versfeld, Pretoria
1999	Golden Lions	Sharks	32–9	Kings Park Stadium, Durban
2000	Western Province	Sharks	25–15	Kings Park Stadium, Durban
2001	Western Province	Sharks	29–24	Newlands Stadium, Cape Town
2002	Blue Bulls	Golden Lions	31–7	Ellis Park Stadium, Johannesburg
2003	Blue Bulls	Sharks	40–19	Loftus Versfeld, Pretoria
2004	Blue Bulls	Free State Cheetahs	42–33	Loftus Versfeld, Pretoria
2005	Free State Cheetahs	Blue Bulls	29–25	Loftus Versfeld, Pretoria
2006	Blue Bulls & Free State Cheetahs (shared)	—N/a	28–28	Free State Stadium, Bloemfontein
2007	Free State Cheetahs	Golden Lions	20–18	Free State Stadium, Bloemfontein
2008	Sharks	Blue Bulls	14–9	Kings Park Stadium, Durban
2009	Blue Bulls	Free State Cheetahs	36–24	Loftus Versfeld, Pretoria
2010	Sharks	Western Province	30–10	Kings Park Stadium, Durban
2011	Golden Lions	Sharks	42–16	Ellis Park Stadium, Johannesburg
2012	Western Province	Sharks	25–18	Kings Park Stadium, Durban
2013	Sharks	Western Province	33–19	Newlands Stadium, Cape Town
2014	Western Province	Golden Lions	19–16	Newlands Stadium, Cape Town
2015	Golden Lions	Western Province	32–24	Ellis Park Stadium, Johannesburg
2016	Free State Cheetahs	Blue Bulls	36–16	Free State Stadium, Bloemfontein
2017	Western Province	Sharks	33–21	Kings Park Stadium, Durban
2018	Sharks	Western Province	17–12	Newlands Stadium, Cape Town
2019	Free State Cheetahs	Golden Lions	31–28	Free State Stadium, Bloemfontein
2020–21^{7}	Blue Bulls	Sharks	26–19^{8}	Loftus Versfeld, Pretoria
2021	Blue Bulls	Sharks	44–10	Loftus Versfeld, Pretoria
2022	Pumas	Griquas	26–19	Griqua Park, Kimberley
2023	Free State Cheetahs	Pumas	25–17	Free State Stadium, Bloemfontein
2024	Sharks	Golden Lions	16–14	Ellis Park Stadium, Johannesburg
2025	Griquas	Golden Lions	27–25	Ellis Park Stadium, Johannesburg
2026	Griquas	Pumas	23–16	Griqua Park, Kimberley

In addition to the winners above, Western Province also won the South African Rugby Board Trophy in 1889. This tournament was effectively the precursor to the Currie Cup, which started in 1892.

^{1} Western Province and Transvaal did not compete.
^{2} Contested over two seasons.
^{3} Transvaal were renamed the Gauteng Lions; now known as Golden Lions.
^{4} Orange Free State were renamed the Free State Cheetahs.
^{5} Northern Transvaal were renamed the Blue Bulls.
^{6} Natal were renamed the Sharks.
^{7} Contested between November and January due to COVID-19 pandemic.
^{8} Final went to extra-time.

=== Currie Cup First Division ===
Currie Cup First Division Champions and Finals Results
Season	Champions	Runner-Up	Score	Final Venue
2000	Blue Bulls	Mighty Elephants	41–20	Telkom Park, Port Elizabeth
2001	Boland Cavaliers	Leopards	41–27	Boland Stadium, Wellington
2002	SWD Eagles	Border Bulldogs	29–20	Outeniqua Park, George
2003	Boland Cavaliers	Leopards	27–25	Olën Park, Potchefstroom
2004	Boland Cavaliers	Border Bulldogs	23–22	Boland Stadium, Wellington
2005	Pumas	Falcons	25–16	Barnard Stadium, Kempton Park
2006	Boland Cavaliers	Leopards	37–13	Olën Park, Potchefstroom
2007	SWD Eagles	Mighty Elephants	38–3	Outeniqua Park, George
2008	Griffons	Leopards	31–26	Olën Park, Potchefstroom
2009	Pumas	SWD Eagles	47–19	Puma Stadium, Witbank
2010	Eastern Province Kings	SWD Eagles	16–12	Outeniqua Park, George
2011	Boland Cavaliers	Eastern Province Kings	43–12	Boland Stadium, Wellington
2012	Eastern Province Kings	Pumas	26–25	Nelson Mandela Bay Stadium, Port Elizabeth
2013	Pumas	Eastern Province Kings	53–30	Mbombela Stadium, Mbombela
2014	Griffons	Falcons	23–21	North West Stadium, Welkom
2015	Leopards	SWD Eagles	44–20	Olën Park, Potchefstroom
2016	Griffons	Leopards	44–25	Olën Park, Potchefstroom
2017	Griffons	Leopards	60–36	North West Stadium, Welkom
2018	SWD Eagles	Falcons	36–27	Outeniqua Park, George
2019	Jaguares XV	Griffons	49–5	Mbombela Stadium, Mbombela
2020^{1}	—N/a	—N/a	—N/a	—N/a
2021	Leopards	Griffons	19–18	Olën Park, Potchefstroom
2022	Griffons	Eastern Province Elephants	45–16	HT Pelatona Projects Stadium, Welkom
2023	Boland Cavaliers	Valke	43–21	Boland Stadium, Wellington
2024	Boland Cavaliers	Eastern Province	27–27^{2}	Boland Stadium, Wellington
2025	Griffons	Valke	51–44	Barnard Stadium, Kempton Park
2026	SWD Eagles	Valke	41–21	Outeniqua Park, George

^{1} The 2020 Currie Cup First Division was cancelled due to the COVID-19 pandemic.
^{2} The final went into extra time. It remained 27 all after the time was up and Boland was determined champions due to scoring more tries in the final.

=== SA Cup ===
SA Cup Champions and Finals Results
Season	Champions	Runner-Up	Score	Final Venue
2024	Griquas	Pumas	46–24	Griqua Park, Kimberley
2025	Pumas	Griquas	39–14	Mbombela Stadium, Mbombela
2026	Pumas	Griquas	38–35	Griqua Park, Kimberley

=== Mzansi Challenge ===
Mzansi Challenge Champions and Finals Results
Season	Champions	Runner-Up	Score	Final Venue
2023	Valke	SWD Eagles	55–38	Barnard Stadium, Kempton Park

=== Champions Match ===
South African Rugby Union announced that fans would get a chance to vote and select their own Currie Cup Select XV. Two matches were played in 2021 and 2022.

Champions Match Results
Season	Winner	Runner-Up	Score	Final Venue
2021 Champions match	Currie Cup Select XV	Kenya	85–17	Loftus Versfeld Stadium, Pretoria
2022 Champions match	Carling Champions team	Italy A	31–27	Nelson Mandela Bay Stadium, Gqeberha

== Overall winners ==
=== Currie Cup Premier Division ===
Overall record in the Currie Cup Premier Division
Team	Number of titles	Runner-up	Semi-Finalists	Notes	Most recent title
Western Province	34	13	11	Four titles shared	2017
Northern Transvaal/Blue Bulls	25	9	11	Four titles shared	2021
Transvaal/Gauteng Lions/Golden Lions	11	14	12	One title shared	2015
Natal/Sharks	9	12	14		2024
Orange Free State/Free State Cheetahs	7	9	16	One title shared	2023
Griqualand West/Griquas	5	1	4		2026
Border/Border Bulldogs	2	0	0	Two titles shared	1934
South Eastern Transvaal/Pumas	1	2	1		2022
Eastern Transvaal/Falcons/Valke	0	1	2		
Boland/Boland Cavaliers	0	1	2		
Northern Free State/Griffons	0	0	4		
Eastern Province	0	0	3		
South West Africa	0	0	1		
SWD/SWD Eagles	0	0	1		
Rhodesia	0	0	1		
Western Transvaal/Leopards	0	0	1		

- Correct as of 12 September 2026

Since the competition became established as an annual competition in 1968 (see History above).

Team	Number of wins	Number shared	Number runners-up	Years won	Years shared	Year runner-up
Northern Transvaal/Blue Bulls	19	4	8	1968, 1969, 1973, 1974, 1975, 1977, 1978, 1980, 1981, 1987, 1988, 1991, 1998, 2002, 2003, 2004, 2009, 2020–21, 2021	1971, 1979, 1989, 2006	1970, 1982, 1983, 1985, 1990, 2005, 2008, 2016
Western Province	11	2	10	1982, 1983, 1984, 1985, 1986, 1997, 2000, 2001, 2012, 2014, 2017	1979, 1989	1969, 1976, 1980, 1988, 1995, 1998, 2010, 2013, 2015, 2018
Natal/Sharks	9	0	11	1990, 1992, 1995, 1996, 2008, 2010, 2013, 2018, 2024		1984, 1993, 1999, 2000, 2001, 2003, 2011, 2012, 2017, 2020–21, 2021
Transvaal/Gauteng Lions/Golden Lions	6	1	13	1972, 1993, 1994, 1999, 2011, 2015	1971	1968, 1974, 1986, 1987, 1991, 1992, 1996, 2002, 2007, 2014, 2019, 2024, 2025
Orange Free State/Free State Cheetahs	6	1	9	1976, 2005, 2007, 2016, 2019, 2023	2006	1973, 1975, 1977, 1978, 1981, 1994, 1997, 2004, 2009
Griqualand West/Griquas	3	0	1	1970, 2025, 2026		2022
Pumas	1	0	2	2022		2023, 2026
Eastern Transvaal/Falcons/Valke	0	0	1			1972

=== Currie Cup First Division ===
Overall winners in the Currie Cup First Division
Team	Number of wins	Runners-up	Years won	Year Runner-up	Secondary titles
Boland Cavaliers	7	0	2001, 2003, 2004, 2006, 2011, 2023, 2024		
Griffons	6	2	2008, 2014, 2016, 2017, 2022, 2025	2019, 2021	
SWD Eagles	4	3	2002, 2007, 2018, 2026	2009, 2010, 2015	
Pumas	3	1	2005, 2009, 2013	2012	SA Cup 2025, 2026
Leopards	2	6	2015, 2021	2001, 2003, 2006, 2008, 2016, 2017	
Eastern Province Kings/Eastern Province Elephants	2	6	2010, 2012	2000, 2007, 2011, 2013, 2022, 2024	
Blue Bulls	1	0	2000		2026 SA Rugby Under-23 Cup
Jaguares XV	1	0	2019		
Falcons/Valke	0	6		2005, 2014, 2018, 2023, 2025, 2026	Mzanzi Challenge
Border	0	2		2002, 2004	
Griquas	0	0			2024 SA Cup

== Records and statistics ==
- Most career matches

Name	Team/s	Seasons	Games
Hugh Reece-Edwards	Natal	1982–1995	165
Jacques Botes	Pumas/Sharks	2002–2014	156
Helgard Müller	Free State Cheetahs	1983–1998	142
Rudi Visagie	Free State/Natal/Mpumalanga	1980–1996	141
Chris Badenhorst	Free State Cheetahs	1987–1999	136
Burger Geldenhuys	Blue Bulls	1977–1989	128
André Joubert	Free State/Natal	1986–1999	126

- Most career points
  - 1. 1699 Naas Botha (Northern Transvaal) 1977–1992
  - 2. 1412 Willem de Waal (Leopards/Free State/WP) 2002–2010
  - 3. 1402 Eric Herbert (Northern Free State (Griffons)/Free State) 1986–2001
  - 4. 1210 De Wet Ras (Free State/Natal) 1974–1986
  - 5. 1165 André Joubert (Free State/Natal) 1986–1999
- Most career tries
  - 1. 74 John Daniels (Golden Lions/Boland Cavaliers)
  - 2. 66 Breyton Paulse (Western Province)
  - 3. 65 Chris Badenhorst (Free State)
  - 4. 58 André Joubert (Free State/Natal)
  - 5. 51 Gerrie Germishuys (Free State/Transvaal)
  - 5. 51 Carel du Plessis (Western Province/Transvaal)
  - 5. 51 Niel Burger (Western Province)
  - 5. 51 Jan-Harm Van Wyk (Free State/Pumas)
- Most individual points in a season
  - 1. 268 Johan Heunis (Northern Transvaal) 1989
  - 2. 263 Gavin Lawless (Golden Lions) 1996
  - 3. 252 Casper Steyn (Blue Bulls) 1999
  - 4. 230 Kennedy Tsimba (Cheetahs) 2003
  - 5. 228 Kennedy Tsimba (Cheetahs) 2002
- Most team points in a season
  - Sharks (792 in 1996)
- Most individual tries in a season
  - 1. 21 Bjorn Basson (Griquas) 2010
  - 2. 19 Carel du Plessis (Western Province) 1989
  - 2. 19 Colin Lloyd (Leopards) 2006
  - 4. 18 Ettienne Botha (Blue Bulls) 2004
  - 5. 16 Jan-Harm Van Wyk (Free State) 1997
  - 6. 15 Phillip Burger (Cheetahs) 2006
- Most team tries in a season
  - Sharks (112 in 1996)
- Most points in match
  - Jannie de Beer – 46 v. Northern Free State in 1997
- Most tries in a match
  - Jacques Olivier – 7 v SWD in 1996
- Most final appearances
  - Burger Geldenhuys 11 (Northern Transvaal—between 1977 and 1989)
  - Naas Botha 11 (Northern Transvaal—between 1977 and 1991)

== Broadcasting rights ==
- SuperSport broadcasts live Currie Cup matches in South Africa.
- Sky Sports broadcasts live Currie Cup matches in Ireland and the United Kingdom.
- FloSports airs live Currie Cup matches in the Americas via online streaming.
- Nine Network airs Currie Cup matches live in Australia through streaming service Stan. Previously matches were aired on Fox Sports.
- RugbyPass airs live Currie Cup matches via online streaming in certain countries in Asia (Bangladesh, Bhutan, Brunei, Cambodia, China, East Timor, Hong Kong, India, Indonesia, Laos, Macau, Malaysia, Maldives, Myanmar, Nepal, Pakistan, Philippines, Singapore, South Korea, Sri Lanka, Taiwan, Thailand and Vietnam), European Economic Area (Austria, Belgium, Bulgaria, Croatia, Cyprus, Czech Republic, Denmark, Estonia, Finland, Germany, Greece, Hungary, Iceland, Latvia, Liechtenstein, Lithuania, Malta, Netherlands, Norway, Poland, Romania, Slovakia, Slovenia, Sweden), and Eastern Europe (Albania, Armenia, Azerbaijan, Belarus, Bosnia, & Herzegovina, Georgia, Kazakhstan, Kosovo, Macedonia, Moldova, Montenegro, Russia, Serbia, Turkey, Ukraine).
- Star+ airs live matches in Latin América, including Brazil.

== See also ==
- Rugby union in South Africa
- Super Rugby
- Super Rugby franchise areas
- SA Cup
- SA Rugby Under-23 Cup
- Mzanzi Challenge
- Preparation Series
- SuperSport Rugby Challenge
- Vodacom Cup
- Bankfin Nite Series
- 2019 Currie Cup First Division
- Lion Cup
- Currie Cup / Central Series
