= 1983 Currie Cup =

Domestic rugby union competition

- Countries: South Africa
- Champions: Western Province (24th title)
- Runners-up: Northern Transvaal

The 1983 Currie Cup was the 45th edition of the Currie Cup, the premier annual domestic rugby union competition in South Africa.

The tournament was won by Western Province for the 24th time; they beat Northern Transvaal 9–3 in the final in Pretoria.

== See also ==
- Currie Cup
