= 1984 Currie Cup =

Domestic rugby union competition

- Countries: South Africa
- Champions: Western Province (25th title)
- Runners-up: Natal

The 1984 Currie Cup was the 46th edition of the Currie Cup, the premier annual domestic rugby union competition in South Africa.

The tournament was won by Western Province for the 25th time; they beat Natal 19–9 in the final in Cape Town.

== See also ==
- Currie Cup
