= 1982 Currie Cup =

Domestic rugby union competition

- Countries: South Africa
- Champions: Western Province (23rd title)
- Runners-up: Northern Transvaal

The 1982 Currie Cup was the 44th edition of the Currie Cup, the premier annual domestic rugby union competition in South Africa.

The tournament was won by Western Province for the 23rd time; they beat Northern Transvaal 24–7 in the final in Cape Town.

This was Province's first outright victory since 1966, and was remembered by Nick Mallet for a back-flip pass by Michael du Plessis.

== See also ==
- Currie Cup
