= Rugby union and apartheid =

Rugby under apartheid South Africa

From 1948 to 1994, international rugby relations with apartheid South Africa, and also the non-integrated nature of rugby within the country drew frequent controversy. South Africa remained a member of the International Rugby Board (IRB) throughout the apartheid era.

Halt All Racist Tours was established in New Zealand in 1969 to oppose continued tours to and from South Africa. Though contacts were restricted after the Gleneagles Agreement in 1977, there were controversial tours in 1980 by the British Lions and by France, in 1981 by Ireland, and in 1984 by England. South Africa toured New Zealand in 1981. South Africa were excluded from the first two Rugby World Cups, in 1987 and 1991. Racially selected New Zealand sports teams toured South Africa until the 1970 All Blacks rugby tour allowed Māori to go under the status of 'honorary whites'.

The issue affected not only black South Africans, but also indigenous New Zealanders and to a lesser extent indigenous Australians. Many major rugby union international sides had few non-white players, but theoretically, a side such as Fiji would have been frowned upon.

Apartheid South Africa's last foreign tour was to New Zealand in 1981, prior to the system's dismantlement in 1991 and new elections in 1994.

== Governing bodies ==
Like most other institutions in South Africa, the South African rugby bodies were divided along racial lines:

- The South African Rugby Board (SARB) for whites,
- The South African Rugby Federation (SARF) for "coloureds" i.e. people considered to be of mixed race.
- The South African Rugby Association (SARA) (originally the South African African Rugby Board) for blacks.

There was also the South African Rugby Union (SARU), which was a non-racial body, with a considerable membership. However, only the SARB had any say in international tours, and they alone chose the national team.

At the end of the 1970s, the SARB took over the SARF and SARA, but Abdul Abbas, leader of SARU refused to co-operate with the new board until the game was integrated at club level and certain political laws scrapped.

== British Lions ==
The British Lions were regular visitors to South Africa until the 1980s, and the less formally segregated colony long before that. They would alternate these tours with tours to Australia and/or New Zealand.

In the years 1948–1980, the Lions made five tours to South Africa, more or less one for every decade, and half of their total ten tours in this period. Their first tour in the apartheid period was in 1955, seven years after the formal inauguration of apartheid. They made further tours in 1962, 1968, 1974 and one final one in 1980. The controversy caused by this matter meant that the Lions did not go back there until their 1997 tour when the South Africa team was ostensibly mixed.

The Lions would have toured South Africa in 1986 if the regular schedule had been kept to, but in December 1985 the South African Rugby Board announced they would not be inviting the Lions to tour the following year. Political objections to South Africa's apartheid policies including a potential boycott of the 1986 Commonwealth Games and state of emergency in South Africa at the time lay behind this decision. The squad selected for an International Rugby Board centenary match was the closest thing to an official 1986 British Lions side. It was managed by Clive Rowlands and coached by Mick Doyle. The 21 players selected were issued with Lions' blazers and ties and considered to be official British Lions.

== Māori and apartheid ==
New Zealand has a long history of sporting contact with South Africa, especially through rugby union. Until the 1970s this resulted in discrimination against Māori players, since the apartheid political system in South Africa for most of the twentieth century did not allow people of different races to play sport together, and therefore South African officials requested that Māori players not be included in sides which toured their country. Despite some of New Zealand's best players being Māori, this was agreed to, and Māori were excluded from tours of South Africa. Some Māori always objected to this, but it did not become a major issue until 1960, when there were several public protests at Māori exclusion from that year's tour. The protest group Halt All Racist Tours was formed in 1969. Although this was an issue in which Māori were central, and Māori were involved in the protests, the anti-tour movement was dominated by Pākehā (white New Zealanders).

In 1973 a proposed Springbok (South African rugby team) tour of New Zealand was cancelled. In 1976 the South African government relented and allowed a mixed-race All Black team to tour South Africa. However, by this time international opinion had turned against any sporting contact with South Africa, and New Zealand faced significant international pressure to cut ties. Despite this, in 1981 the Springboks toured New Zealand, sparking mass protests and civil disobedience. Although Pākehā continued to dominate the movement, Māori were prominent within it, and in Auckland formed the patu squad in order to remain autonomous within the wider movement.

During and after the Tour, many Māori protesters questioned Pākehā protesters' commitment to racial equality, accusing them of focusing on racism in other countries while ignoring it within New Zealand. The majority of Pākehā protesters were not heavily involved in protest after the Tour ended, but a significant minority, including several anti-Tour groups, turned their attention to New Zealand race issues, particularly Pākehā prejudice and the Treaty of Waitangi.

== 1950s ==
South Africa's isolation in sport began in the mid-1950s and increased throughout the 1960s. Apartheid forbade multiracial sport, which meant that overseas teams, by virtue of their having players of diverse races, could not play in South Africa. In 1956, the International Table Tennis Federation severed its ties with the all-white South African Table Tennis Union, preferring the non-racial South African Table Tennis Board. The apartheid government responded by confiscating the passports of the Board's players so that they were unable to attend international games.

In April 2010 it was revealed by Muru Walters that in 1956 Ernest Corbett, Minister of Māori Affairs, had told the Māori All Blacks to deliberately lose to the Springboks "for the future of rugby". The Māori team lost 37–0. This was followed by Walters calling for the New Zealand government to apologise for the way it treated Māori rugby players.

== 1960s ==
Foreign complaints about South Africa's segregated sports brought more isolation. In 1960, Verwoerd barred a Māori rugby player from touring South Africa with New Zealand, and the tour was cancelled. New Zealand made a decision not to send an authorised rugby team to South Africa again.

In 1961, South Africa left the Commonwealth, having been forced out at the 1961 Commonwealth Prime Ministers' Conference. In 1963, Lloyd McDermott, the first Australian aborigine on the Australia team refused to go on a tour of South Africa, and switched to rugby league as a result.

B. J. Vorster took Verwoerd's place as PM in 1966 and declared that South Africa would no longer dictate to other countries what their teams should look like. Although this reopened the gate for sporting competition, it did not signal the end of South Africa's racist sporting policies. In 1968, Vorster went against his policy by refusing to permit Basil D'Oliveira, a Coloured South African-born cricketer, to join the English cricket team on its tour to South Africa. Vorster said that the side had been chosen only to prove a point, and not on merit. After protests, however, "Dolly" was eventually included in the team. Protests against certain tours brought about the cancellation of a number of other visits, like that of an England rugby team in 1969/70.

== 1970s ==
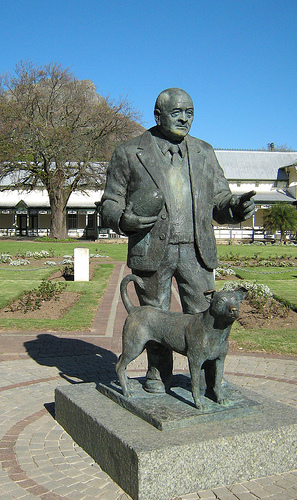
Statue of Danie Craven in Stellenbosch

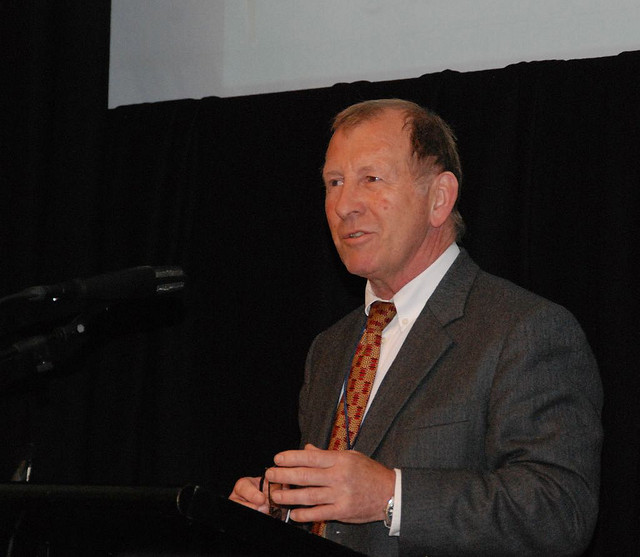
Chris Laidlaw, former All Black, politician and fierce critic of apartheid

In March 1973, the Argentine government and the Union Argentina de Rugby had a great conflict: the government contested to UAR the permit given to San Isidro Club to visit South Africa, and forced the federal committee of UAR to resign. A new committee was elected on 24 April 1973. In November the government also forbade all visits to South Africa by any Argentine team and any visit of a South African team into Argentina. This ban remained until 1991.

South Africa was the indirect cause of the 1976 Olympic boycott. A New Zealand rugby union tour of South Africa prompted African countries to demand that the New Zealand Olympic team be excluded from the games. The IOC demurred on the grounds that rugby union was not an Olympic sport and the New Zealand Rugby Union was not affiliated to the New Zealand Olympic Committee. Of 28 African invitees, 26 boycotted the Games, joined by Iraq and Guyana.

In February 1977, Danie Craven flew to London to plead for South African rugby's reintegration into the international scene, and to make a last ditch attempt to save the Springboks' scheduled tour of the British Isles in 1978, and the British Lions tour of South Africa in 1980.

For the first time I no longer have to circumvent questions, I can at long last look everybody in the face. It is really a disgrace that we in South Africa have tolerated putting the Blacks and Coloured in a place, perhaps the worst place imaginable in our rugby grounds. We are now closing a book and entering a new era. South Africa will never be the same again. You know we must make changes towards a multi-racial deal not to placate or pander to overseas opinion but because it is the right and just thing.

However, some, such as Chris Laidlaw, later a Labour MP in New Zealand, had had enough, and believed that rugby's failure to engage with the issue properly was harming the sport:

Times have changed, however. Youth has begun to write its own rules and by the 1970s the conventions of the rugby community had begun to look a little creaky, its formalities became a bore. The cleavage was brought into sharp relief by the tragic failure of rugby to come to grips with the problem of racism in Southern Africa. The emerging reputation of the rugby player throughout the Anglo-Saxon world as an outdated, boorish oaf – a reputation derived as much from the insensitivities of the rugby community as from the intolerance of the younger generation - was given a new dimension by the quarrels over apartheid in sport. Rightly or wrongly, it has dealt the image of rugby a vicious blow, one from which it may never really recover. South Africa has now been exposed for what it really is, a malignant cancer in the corpus of rugby which has long called for the surgeon's knife. Yet the rugby community - most notably in New Zealand - still remains fatally hesitant when it comes to acting as doctor.

But there were criticisms of the behaviour of some of the protesters too. Bill McLaren thought apartheid was "unacceptable", but:

...some of the actions adopted by those aiming to stop tours were despicable. Bette [Bill McLaren's wife] and I were referred to as 'racist scum' on our way down to Mansfield Park to see the South African Barbarians play in 1979 – a tour party comprising equal numbers of coloureds, blacks and whites. That, said the protesters, was just window dressing. When the Springboks last toured the UK, I was asked to provide commentary on their match against the Midland Counties (East) at Welford Road, Leicester. I remember having to walk the gauntlet up a narrow channel lined on each side by policemen holding back the mob. Those policemen were covered in spittle, had hats knocked off, were kicked in places where no man should be kicked, and yet took it all with stoic calm. I couldn't believe that people in the British Isles would behaved in that manner.... Constant noise outside the South Africans' hotels to try and prevent them sleeping was another unbelievable ploy that sickened decent people.

== 1980s ==
Though contacts were restricted after the Gleneagles Agreement in 1977, there were controversial tours in 1980 by the British Lions and by France, in 1981 by Ireland, and in 1984 by England. In 1986, though a Lions tour was cancelled, South Africans played in all-star matches in Cardiff and in London marking the IRB centenary. South Africa was excluded from the first two Rugby World Cups, in 1987 and 1991.

In 1982 the political relationship between Australia and Argentina was also damaged due to the Falklands War.

The Soviet Union supposedly turned down its invitation to the 1987 Rugby World Cup, because of its distaste for the apartheid regime of South Africa. However, South Africa was not invited in the end. While the Great Soviet Encyclopedia states that rugby is popular in Great Britain, New Zealand, France, Romania and Australia, it tellingly makes no mention of South Africa. Chris Thau says that France approached the USSR before 1987 on the issue, and that the Soviets said that they would be happy to participate if South Africa was not invited. In the end, South Africa was not invited, but the USSR did not attend either. It has been said that:

No nation outside the Third World did more than the USSR to oppose apartheid in sport and have South Africa banned from world sports forums and arenas.

The Soviets leaned on other nations heavily:

Over the years, Ferasse has resisted Eastern Bloc pressure to break with South Africa. At one point Moscow threatened to set up a rival Federation, but the Rumanians, with whom the French have long had good relationships, stood by France. Moscow tried again later by threatening to call off the France v. USSR match in Toulouse in November 1978. Once again Ferasse held firm and the Russians went to France, where they were beaten 29-7

In September 1981, South Africa was due to play the Mid-West in Chicago. To avoid protestors, they drove 77 miles to Racine and played in front of 247 spectators, winning 46–12. By the time they returned to Chicago, none of the protestors knew that the game had happened.

In 1989 a World XV, sanctioned by the IRB and funded by South African Breweries, played two tests against South Africa in 1989 in celebration of the centenary of the South African Rugby Board (SARB). The Springboks won both, by 20–19 at Newlands Stadium in Cape Town and the second test 22–16 on 2 September at Ellis Park in Johannesburg .

=== South Africa in New Zealand, 1981 ===
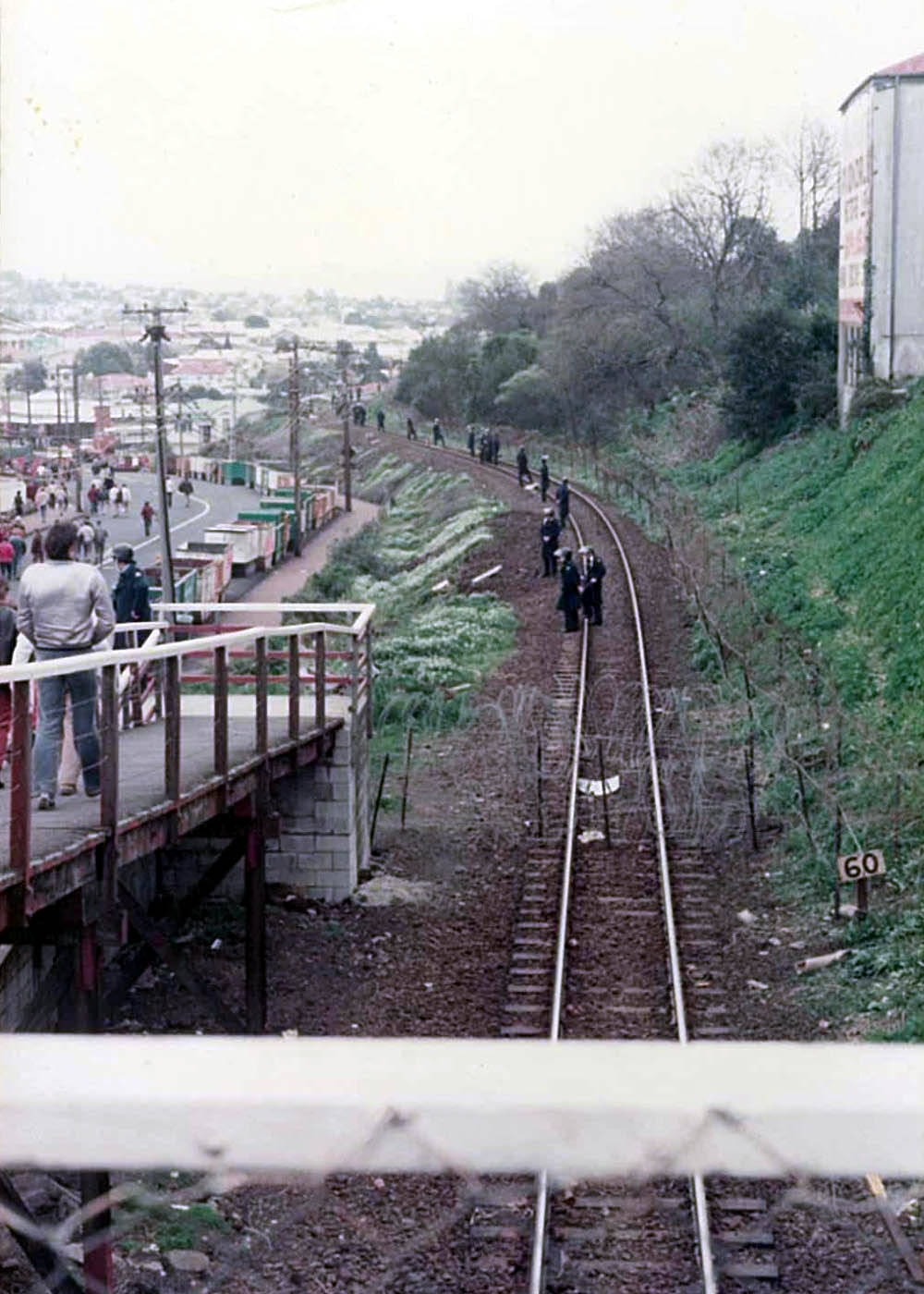
Police officers guarding a barbed wire perimeter around Eden Park near Kingsland railway station in New Zealand

The 1981 Springboks tour of New Zealand was compromised by demonstrations, and the tourists had to be kept under strict security throughout their visit.

Two games had to be cancelled. The game at Hamilton in the first week of the tour saw 200 protestors rip down a chain fence, sprinkle tacks all over the pitch and then staged a sit-in on the halfway line. At the time, a crowd of 25,000 was watching them playing Waikato. Subsequent matches saw the arrival of barbed wire, and police with batons. The match against South Canterbury at Timaru was cancelled because the authorities thought that they would not be able to control the demonstrations there.

The final test of the tour was buzzed by a Cessna aircraft - some in fact nicknamed it the "Crazy Biggles Test". The plane continually strafed the pitch, and dropped flour bombs, flares and leaflets. All-Black prop Gary Knight was temporarily stunned by a flour bomb.

Musician Bruce Russell received two police convictions as a student leader of protests against the tour. He was at the University of Otago at the time.

It was a tight game, with Allan Hewson, the New Zealand full-back kicking a long range penalty to win the game 25–22. As Rod Chester and Nev McMillan described the scene:

There will probably never be another Test match like this. The tension generated by the closeness and importance of the game, combined with the efforts of the protestors inside, outside and above the ground, made for an exhilarating and yet terrifying afternoon.

The role of the NZ police also became more controversial as a result of the tour.

The NZRFU constitution contained much high-minded wording about promoting the image of rugby and New Zealand, and generally being a benefit to society. In 1985 the NZRFU proposed an All Black tour of South Africa that remobilised New Zealand protesters. Two lawyers successfully sued it, claiming such a tour would breach its constitution. The High Court stopped the tour.

=== New Zealand Cavaliers ===
A "rebel tour" not government sanctioned went ahead in 1986, but after that sporting ties were cut, and New Zealand made a decision not to convey an authorised rugby team to South Africa until the end of apartheid. This followed the intensely controversial 1981 South African tour New Zealand which had provoked nationwide protest and world-wide condemnation. The Cavaliers tour was very controversial within New Zealand and the players found that support for their actions was far less than they had expected. This controversy meant there were no future rugby contacts until the South African apartheid regime ended.

The All Blacks did not tour South Africa until after the fall of the apartheid régime (1990–1994), although after the 1985 tour was cancelled an unofficial tour took place in 1986 by a team that included 28 out of the 30 All Blacks selected for the 1985 tour, known as the New Zealand Cavaliers but often advertised in South Africa as the All Blacks or depicted with the Silver Fern.

Of the 30 players who had been selected for the All Black tour, only David Kirk and John Kirwan did not join the Cavaliers. The rebel team were widely believed to have received large secret payments—a controversial issue at a time when rugby union was still supposedly an amateur sport

On their return, the NZRFU barred all the players from participating in the next two All Black tests, and instead selected a new group of players. Most of these replacement players were younger, and were quickly dubbed the "Baby Blacks". Those new All Blacks went on to form the basis of one of the most successful periods in All Black rugby, which resulted in many Cavalier players struggling to get their places back.

=== South American Jaguars ===
The Jaguars consisted mainly of Argentine rugby players, but also with some from Uruguay, Brazil, Paraguay, Chile and Spain.

While many of these countries suffered from dictatorships, they too had sporting bans of a sort. The Jaguars were not officially recognised by Union Argentina de Rugby, a stratagem to elude the prohibition of the Argentine government that since the early 1970s forbade any official relationship between any Argentine sport federation and South African and Rhodesian ones, due to the politics of those countries. This ostracism started in 1971 when the Argentine government forbade the Pumas to play a match in Rhodesia during the tour in South Africa.

== Post-apartheid era ==
=== 1995 Rugby World Cup ===
After his election in 1994, Nelson Mandela encouraged black South Africans to get behind the previously hated national rugby team, the Springboks, as South Africa hosted the 1995 Rugby World Cup.

Prior to the World Cup in 1995, the Springboks were only seeded ninth and were not expected to dethrone the incumbent champions Australia, who had not lost a game in the preceding 12 months.

During the tournament, South Africa defeated Australia, Romania, Canada, Western Samoa and France. They then met New Zealand in the 1995 Rugby World Cup Final at Ellis Park Stadium. Springbok captain Francois Pienaar played on in extra-time despite a calf strain and the Springboks secured a three-point victory with a drop goal from Joel Stransky.

During the remarkable post-match presentation ceremony, Nelson Mandela presented Pienaar with the Webb Ellis Cup while wearing a Springbok jersey bearing Pienaar's own number 6. During his acceptance speech, Pienaar made it clear that the team had won the trophy not just for the 60,000 fans at Ellis Park, but also for all 43,000,000 South Africans.

This was widely seen as a major step in the reconciliation of white and black South Africans; as F.W. de Klerk later put it, "Mandela won the hearts of millions of white rugby fans." Mandela's efforts at reconciliation assuaged the fears of whites, but also drew criticism from more militant blacks. His estranged wife, Winnie, accused the ANC of being more interested in appeasing whites than in helping blacks.

These events, along with the relationship between Mandela and Pienaar, were the subject of a 2008 book by John Carlin, Playing the Enemy: Nelson Mandela and the Game that Made a Nation, that spotlights the role of the 1995 Cup win in post-apartheid South Africa. Carlin sold the film rights to Morgan Freeman. The result was the 2009 film Invictus, directed by Clint Eastwood and starring Freeman as Nelson Mandela and Matt Damon as Pienaar.

== Views ==
In his autobiography, Scottish commentator Bill McLaren wrote in 1991: "It has been a disgrace that a World Rugby Union power has been eliminated from world competition for all those years, even allowing for their country's unacceptable racist policy."

Ian Robertson documented how the Springboks' position slowly deteriorated over the decades, but suggested that the fault lay outside the rugby fraternity:

The Springboks had fulfilled all of their touring commitments through the Fifties and Sixties but the oppressive, claustrophobic political pressures overwhelmed them during the Seventies. They have not been able to play in Britain, Ireland, France or Australia since 1974, and their only major tour abroad in the last ten years to New Zealand in 1981, was full of controversy, and mass demonstrations. There is no doubt that giant steps have been taken to make Rugby totally integrated in South Africa in recent years, and their supporters feel that no sooner have they fulfilled the conditions required of them by world opinion than the goalposts are moved. Their opponents, who are against having any sporting links with a country which practises apartheid, accept that sport in South Africa has become increasingly integrated but claim it is impossible to have normal sport in an abnormal society.

== See also ==
- 1968 Olympics Black Power salute
- Apartheid-era South Africa and the Olympics
- British and Irish Lions
- Halt All Racist Tours
- Peter McGregor
- New Zealand Cavaliers
- South African rebel tours (cricket)
- South American Jaguars
- Sporting boycott of South Africa during the Apartheid era

== Sources ==
- Bath, Richard (ed.) The Complete Book of Rugby (Seven Oaks Ltd, 1997 ISBN 978-1-86200-013-1)
- ed. Brown, Archie; Kaser, Michael & Smith, Gerald S. (ed.s) The Cambridge Encyclopedia of Russia and the former Soviet Union, (2nd Ed., Cambridge University Press, Cambridge, England 1994; ISBN 0-521-35593-1)
- Cotton, Fran (Ed.) The Book of Rugby Disasters & Bizarre Records. (Compiled by Chris Rhys, Century Publishing, London, 1984). ISBN 0-7126-0911-3
- Griffiths, John. Rugby's Strangest Matches: Extraordinary but true stories from over a century of rugby (Past Times/Robson Books, England; ISBN 978-1-86105-354-1)
- Hopkins, John (ed) Rugby (1979 ISBN 0-304-30299-6)
- Laidlaw, Chris From Twickers with Love: Rugby's Universal Message in Hopkins, John (ed) Rugby (1979 ISBN 0-304-30299-6)
- Richards, Huw A Game for Hooligans: The History of Rugby Union (Mainstream Publishing, Edinburgh, 2007, ISBN 978-1-84596-255-5)
- Riordan, James Sport in Soviet Society — development of sport and physical education in Russia and the USSR (Cambridge University Press, Cambridge, England, 1977)
- Sorokin, A.A. (А. А. Сорокин) "Rugby" (Регби) in English translation of Great Soviet Encyclopedia (Progress Publishers, Moscow, 1978)
- Starmer-Smith, Nigel (ed) Rugby - A Way of Life, An Illustrated History of Rugby (Lennard Books, 1986 ISBN 0-7126-2662-X)
- Thau, Chris Soviet Rugby in Starmer-Smith, Nigel & Robertson, Ian (eds) The Whitbread Rugby World '89 (Lennard Books, 1988 ISBN 1-85291-038-0)
- Thau, Chris Soviet Students in Starmer-Smith, Nigel & Robertson, Ian (eds) The Whitbread Rugby World '90 (Lennard Books, 1989 ISBN )
- The Ultimate Encyclopaedia of Rugby, (Carlton Books, 1997 ISBN 1-85868-076-X)
- Dancing On Our Bones: New Zealand, South Africa, Rugby and Racism by Trevor Richards (Bridget Williams Books, 1999). The author was one of a small group of people who founded Halt All Racist Tours (HART) in Auckland in 1969 and worked for the organisation for many years, serving as chair (1969–1980) and international secretary (1980–1985).

== Sources ==
- Meredith, Martin (2010). Mandela: A Biography. New York: PublicAffairs. ISBN 978-1-58648-832-1.
- Sampson, Anthony (2011) [1999]. Mandela: The Authorised Biography. London: HarperCollins. ISBN 978-0-00-743797-9.
