= Errol Tobias =

South African rugby union player

- Born: Errol Tobias; 18 March 1950 (age 76) Caledon, South Africa
- Height: 1.75 m (5 ft 9 in)
- Weight: 76.66 kg (12 st 1.0 lb)
- School: Swartberg Secondary School, Caledon

Rugby union career
- Position(s): Fly-half, Centre
Amateur team(s)
Years	Team	Apps	(Points)
- Caledonians RFC
Provincial / State sides
Years	Team	Apps	(Points)
- Boland
-	SARFF		
International career
Years	Team	Apps	(Points)
1981–84	South Africa	6	(22)

Errol George Tobias (born 18 March 1950) is a former South African rugby union player, and the first player of colour to play in a test match for the South African national side. He gained six caps between 1981 and 1984 when the country was still following the policy of apartheid. Tobias's selection paved the way for other black players to be added to the national team: first Avril Williams, and later, Avril's nephew, Chester Williams. Of his 21 games for the Springboks, six were tests.

== Early life and rugby career ==
Errol Tobias was born on the farm Klipdrift, located outside Caledon in the Overberg district of the Western Cape.

In August 1978, Tobias turned out at fly-half for a multi-racial South African Country Districts XV against the American Cougars. Tobias scored two tries at the Border Rugby Union Grounds, and helped in the scoring of two more. About 5,500 spectators witnessed the 44–12 victory over the American team. The Associated Press erroneously reported this match as being the first in which a multi-racial team played against an international touring side in South Africa. In fact, the first official multi-racial team to play a foreign national side was the South African Invitation XV which included four players of colour: John Noble, Turkey Shields, Toto Tsotsobe and Morgan Cushe. Selected by Danie Craven, the team beat the French on 7 June 1975 at Newlands in Cape Town by 18 points to 3.

== International career ==
Tobias' international career began when he was selected for the Proteas' 1971 tour of Britain. The Proteas were affiliated with the Coloured South African Rugby Football Federation, one of four racially segregated rugby union associations in South Africa at the time.

On 4 June 1974 Tobias scored the only points (a penalty and a drop-kick) at fly-half as the South African Proteas were beaten 6–37 by the touring Lions side at Goodwood Showground in Cape Town.

In 1979 Tobias was part of the first multi-racial South African Barbarians side to tour the United Kingdom under manager Chick Henderson. Tobias was again included at centre in the South African Barbarians team that lost 14–25 to the British Lions at Kings Park on 2 July 1980. His teammates included Hugo Porta and three players of colour, Francois Davids, Charles Williams and Solomon Mhlaba.

Tobias was a member of the Springbok touring party to South America in October 1980 which was denied visas to enter Argentina. Due to international political pressure to sever cultural and sporting ties with South Africa because of apartheid, the tour was wrapped in secrecy, and matches played against Paraguay, Uruguay and Chile drew crowds as small as one hundred.

In 1981 Tobias was selected at centre for the Springboks to play against the touring Irish team. In the first test at Newlands on 30 May, a crowd of 37,000 watched as Tobias broke, then gave an inside pass to Rob Louw, who scored. Prior to the test Danie Craven warned Tobias that the game would be over before he would even realize that he was representing his country. The Springboks defeated the Irish 23–15, with Danie Gerber scoring one of the best tries ever seen at Newlands, Tobias recalled.

Tobias received his call-up to the national team's tour to New Zealand in 1981 from Dr Danie Craven via telephone. Before the ill-fated Springbok tour, managed by Johan Claassen and coached by Nelie Smith, Tobias prepared to play on the rain-soaked rugby fields that he expected to encounter by turning his back yard into a mud-bath.

His selection was controversial at home and abroad, with some critics suggesting that he was included as a token Black player. He was the target of placards and verbal abuse from the New Zealand anti-apartheid organisation Halt All Racist Tours, whose Dick Cuthbert called Tobias "an Uncle Tom". Within the touring squad attitudes towards Tobias also differed. Naas Botha implied in 2006 that players were more accepting, while Johan Claassen admitted that team management possibly had an "anti-Errol" bias.

== International caps ==
No.	Opposition	Result	Position	Points	Date	Ground
1.	Ireland	23 - 15	Outside Centre		30 May 1981	Newlands Stadium, Cape Town
2.	Ireland	12 - 10	Outside Centre		6 June 1981	Kings Park Stadium, Durban
3.	England	33 - 15	Fly-half		2 June 1984	Boet Erasmus Stadium, Port Elizabeth
4.	England	35 - 9	Fly-half	6 (1 try, 1 conv.)	9 June 1984	Ellis Park Stadium, Johannesburg
5.	South American Jaguars	32 - 15	Fly-half	10 (2 conv., 2 pen.)	20 October 1984	Loftus Versfeld Stadium, Pretoria
6.	South American Jaguars	22 - 13	Fly-half	6 (2 pen.)	27 October 1984	Newlands Stadium, Cape Town

== Later life ==
Tobias worked as a brick-layer and later owned his own construction company. He is married and has a son, Sidney (Sid), who was selected for the Western Province Under-21 side in October 2010, while another, also called Errol, played for the Bloemfontein club Old Greys in 2004. Errol Junior was included at fly-half in the 2004 tryouts for the Cats Super 12 team, and was a replacement for the Leopards' during the 2007 Currie Cup season. In 2011 Sid Tobias played for the Sale Jets, for whom he scored a hat-trick in a game against Northampton Wanderers.

As co-commentator for provincial, Super Rugby, and test matches, Tobias drew positive comments from the public for his elegant use of Afrikaans, although others opined that he was not good at summarising.

On 8 November 1995 he became the first black mayor of his home town, Caledon. He had stood for election as part of the Caledon Community Association, formed in 1993, and which aimed to improve the welfare of local residents. Tobias' association won 5 of 13 available seats, and formed a coalition with the African National Congress. He committed himself to promoting racial reconciliation by running rugby training camps. During 1996 he lost his position when the local ANC elected Abe Botha as new mayor. Tobias, who continued as a councillor, initially criticized the new mayor for being part of the repression of Coloured residents during Botha's earlier terms as mayor from 1974 to 1981. Tobias later committed to co-operate with Botha for the welfare of the town.

== See also ==
- List of South Africa national rugby union players – Springbok no. 515
