= Proteas (rugby union) =

The Proteas was the representative side of the South African Rugby Football Federation, one of three racially segregated rugby union governing bodies in apartheid South Africa.

In December 1971 the Proteas embarked on a six-match tour of Britain and Holland – the first "Coloured" rugby team to tour abroad. Arriving on the 13th, they were met at the airport by protesters from anti-apartheid movements. The Proteas lost their first match 3–14 to Hertfordshire at Croxley Green on 16 December, after the home side had led 10–3 at half-time. A fight broke out during the game, which the press blamed on the Proteas' tactic of tackling at head height. The tour ended with a 33–3 loss to the United Hospitals on 2 January 1972 in London. Cuthbert (Charles) Loriston, the Proteas' team manager and SARFF's first president, explained that the purpose of the tour was " 'to test our strength' ". He said that the two wins, a draw, and three losses proved that " 'we have the technical know-how and enthusiasm to build strong opposition within the next five years' ". The wins came against county side Oxfordshire (33–5) and a London team (19–12). Loriston said that the next steps would be to play against white teams that tour South Africa, such as England's intended visit the next year; to play white South African teams; and then move towards integration of sports. He concluded that the Proteas had found, despite their initial scepticism, that they were treated " 'differently than...at home' ".

The first of Loriston's next steps was duly made on 22 May 1972 when the Proteas side lost narrowly (6–11) to John Pullin's touring England side in Cape Town. England had undertaken a short, unbeaten seven match tour to the Republic and whilst the headlines in the UK were undoubtedly linked to his side's 18–9 test match victory, the Proteas versus England fixture remains the first reported international rugby match in which coloureds played against whites on South African soil. The Sunday Times later reported that the showings of both the Proteas side and the blacks' Leopards side (who lost considerably more heavily against England two days later in Port Elizabeth) " gave the lie to the oft-repeated claim in South Africa that no blacks are ready for a trial against the top local white players."

On Tuesday 4 June 1974, the Proteas played against the touring Lions side at Goodwood Showground in Cape Town. Fly-half Errol Tobias scored the only points (a penalty and a drop-kick) for the Proteas, who were beaten 6–37 by the visitors. The team included Hennie Shields, John Noble, Turkey Shields, Doug Dyers and William Reeding. For the Lions, centre Dick Milliken, wing J. J. Williams, lock Gordon Brown, flank and captain Fergus Slattery scored a try each. Fullback Andy Irvine (a conversion, three penalty kicks) and fly-half Alan Old (two penalties) also contributed.

1974 also saw the Proteas compete against the Leopards in what have been referred to as two mini tests in Johannesburg and Port Elizabeth, respectively.

1975 saw the French undertake an eleven match tour to South Africa which included two tests. They played their third tour fixture against the Proteas at Goodwood in Cape Town on 4 June 1975 winning by a comfortable 37–3 margin. It was perhaps the events that unfolded at Newlands some three days which resonated louder when a South African Invitation XV, the first official mixed-race team (containing white, black and coloured players) ever fielded in South Africa ran out 18–3 winners against the touring side. Strand prop Turkey Shields and Stellenbosch's try-scoring wing, John Noble represented the Federation in the victorious Invitation XV.

During the 1976 All Black tour of South Africa, the Proteas were defeated 3–25 by the tourists on a wet 7 July at the Goodwood Oval in Cape Town before a crowd of 10,000. The full-strength All Black team included players such as Laurie Mains, Bill Osborne, Sid Going, Andy Leslie, Frank Oliver and Lawrie Knight. Among the Proteas were John Noble and Charles Williams (who would later go on to represent the South African Barbarians side who toured Britain in 1979).

Billy Beaumont's British and Irish Lions touring side of 1980 defeated a Proteas XV 15–6 in front of a crowd of 15,000 at the Danie Craven Stadium on 27 May 1980. The nomenclature Proteas XV is of import here and the distinction is made since whilst the Proteas' running backline included notable SARFF star players such as Ronnie Louw, John Noble, Hennie Shields, Charles Williams, Frankie Davids, Errol Tobias (who notched two penalties on the day) and Attie Lategan, the Proteas' forward pack's front five was composed entirely of white Western Province players. A similar arrangement had been witnessed when the Lions played a Leopards XV bolstered by numerous WP and Northern's personnel a little under two weeks earlier in the tour match in Border and signified recognition that the touring party had expressed a commitment that it would not compete against teams overtly selected on racial grounds alone.

Within four months, the Federation's star outside-half, Errol Tobias was included in the Springboks' Tour party to South America and 30 May 1981 saw Tobias become the first non-white to be capped when he was selected at outside centre in the 12–10 defeat of Fergus Slattery's Irish touring side.

== See also ==
- SAARB Leopards
- South African Rugby Football Federation
- South African Rugby Union
