= Dean Parker =

New Zealand screenwriter (1947–2020)

Dean Leo Parker (20 August 1947 – 14 April 2020) was a New Zealand screenwriter, playwright, journalist and political commentator based in Auckland. Known for the screenplay of iconic film Came a Hot Friday which he co-wrote with Ian Mune, the television film Old Scores and recent play Midnight in Moscow and was awarded Laureate of the New Zealand Arts Foundation in 2010.

== Biography ==
=== Early years ===
Parker was born in Napier, Hawke's Bay. He went to school at Napier Marist and St John's College, Hastings.

By 1969 he was living in London, England. While of mainly Irish ancestry, he knew little of the Irish struggle until The Troubles began that year in Northern Ireland. Parker joined the Northern Ireland Civil Rights Solidarity Campaign, led by the International Socialists (now known as the Socialist Workers Party), and immersed himself in literature on the Irish struggle. He continued his involvement with the International Socialists into the early 1970s, attending branch meetings in West London, with his old Napier friend, Blair Peach. Peach was later killed while participating in a 1979 anti-National Front rally.

=== Career ===
Parker worked as a writer for much of his life and was prominent in his union, the New Zealand Writers Guild. His plays included Midnight in Moscow — which The Press reviewer Alan Scott called "entertaining and thought-provoking" and "one of his best to date" — 2005's Iraq-set Baghdad, Baby, and an adaptation of Nicky Hager's exposé The Hollow Men. He won awards in New Zealand for teleplay Share the Dream (starring Joel Tobeck), and co-writing the successful big-screen comedy Came a Hot Friday. The 1985 film centered on two conmen in small town New Zealand, and was adapted from the novel by Ronald Hugh Morrieson.

Parker's theatrical CV included The Feds, Two Fingers From Frank Zappa, and adaptations of Great Expectations, and The Trial. He also wrote many radio plays, among them Joe Stalin Knew My Father and Engels F: A History of the Ould Sod.

Arguably his best-known television work is Welsh-Kiwi rugby tale Old Scores, which Parker co-wrote with ex All Black triallist and occasional soccer player Greg McGee. The two also co-created the 1980s trucking series Roche, whose cast included John Bach and Andy Anderson, and goldmining drama Gold, a co-production between New Zealand and Canada. Parker also worked on episodes of police drama Mortimer's Patch, Betty's Bunch, and documentary Just Slightly, A People Apart: The Irish in NZ.

In 1990 Parker co-directed Shattered Dreams, a documentary on the years leading up to the 1951 Waterfront strike.

By 1975, Parker was back in New Zealand. Horrified at the election of National Prime Minister, Robert Muldoon, Parker joined the pro-Soviet Socialist Unity Party of New Zealand and soon became chairman of its Auckland City Branch. He was active in the Campaign for an Independent East Timor and played soccer for the Halt All Racist Tours team for a number of years, though the quality of his play was purportedly variable.

In July 1977 he penned the first of many articles on Ireland for the SUP's paper, Tribune. By the late 1970s the SUP had decided to ally with the Labour Party. Parker resigned from the SUP in 1978, though he remained a supporter into the late 1980s.

In 1979 Parker travelled to Northern Ireland, visiting West Belfast and trouble spots such as the Falls Road. Returning to New Zealand, Parker helped form H Block/Armagh in 1980/81 as a support group for republican prisoners in Irish jails. Parker served on the editorial board of the organisation's publication Saoirse from 1982 until its demise in 2000. Parker contributed regular articles on Irish issues to SUP publications until the party split in 1990.

In 1991 Parker was a member of the Editorial Group of the socialist journal Agenda. He was also active in the Workers' Charter Movement, a joint project of Socialist Worker, SPA, John Minto's Global Peace and Justice Auckland and Matt McCarten's Unite Union.

He also contributed to the New Zealand Listener and The New Zealand Herald.

Parker was a Marxist–Leninist, and injected his politics into his art.

In the socialist journal Sites, No. 16 Autumn 1988, he wrote, "I would describe myself as a class-conscious writer. I'm with Lenin. I'm for the working class seizing control of the wealth it creates, for the replacement of parliament, the army, the police, the judiciary — all those deadly manacles of state control — with workers' committees and militias, and all this done as part of a world-wide struggle ..."

=== Personal life ===
Parker and his partner Isabel lived in Ponsonby, Auckland and had a son. Parker died on 14 April 2020 aged 72, having finished a stage adaption of Albert Camus' The Plague the previous day.

== Works ==
Selected works produced by Dean Parker over his career are listed below.

=== Plays ===
- Midnight in Moscow
- The Tigers Of Wrath
- Other People's Wars
- Slouching Toward Bethlehem
- The Perfumed Garden
- The Man That Lovelock Couldn't Beat
- Baghdad Baby!
- The Hollow Men
- Tonite Let's All Make Love in London

=== Screenplays and television ===
- Came a Hot Friday (film) Co-written with Ian Mune — adapted from the novel by Ronald Hugh Morrison
- Old Scores Co-written with Greg McGee — a Welsh-Kiwi rugby tale
- Share The Dream (television)
- Life's a Riot (television)
- Roche (television) Co-created with Greg McGee
- Gold (television)
- Shattered Dreams (television) Co-director. A documentary on the years leading up to the 1951 waterfront strike.

=== Other ===
- 2017 Johnson — novel. A sequel to John Mulgan's Man Alone SKU: 978-0-947493-53-0

== Awards ==
- 1986 Screenplay Adaption — Film Came a Hot Friday, co-written by Dean Parker and Ian Mune — National Mutual GOFTA Awards
- 1998 Best Television Drama Script — TV Guide Television Awards
- 2010 Laureate Award — Arts Foundation (New Zealand)
- 2012 Playmarket Award for significant artistic contribution (inaugural winner)
