= Rugby union in South Africa =

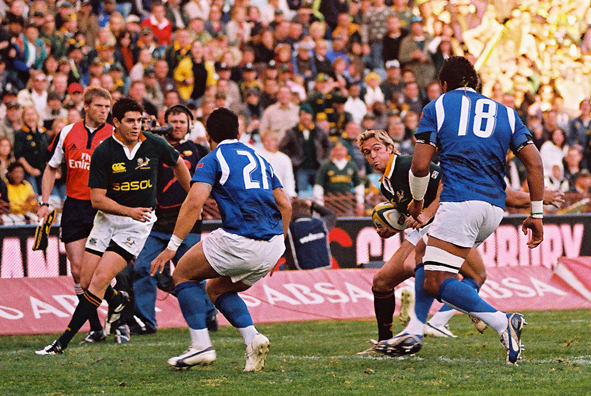
- Springbok Percy Montgomery weaves his way towards the try-line against Samoa on 9 June 2007
- Country: South Africa
- Governing body: South African Rugby Union
- National teams: South Africa national rugby union team South Africa women's national rugby union team South Africa national rugby sevens team South Africa women's national rugby sevens team
- Nicknames: Springboks; Boks; Bokke; Amabokoboko
- First played: 1862, Cape Town
- Registered players: 651,146 (total); 121,663 (adult); 204,119 (teen); 325,364 (pre-teen)
- Clubs: 1,526

Club competitions
- Currie Cup; SA Cup; Varsity Cup; Gold Cup; Craven Week

International competitions
- The Rugby Championship; Cape Town Sevens; World Rugby competitions: Rugby World Cup; Rugby World Cup Sevens; Sevens World Series; Women's Rugby World Cup; World Rugby Women's Sevens Series

Rugby union in South Africa is a highly popular team sport, along with cricket and soccer, and is widely played all over the country. South Africa has the largest proportion of rugby union supporters in the world with a 2013 SMG Insight report indicating 70% of the people liking the sport.

The national team is among the strongest in the world and has been ranked in at least the top seven of the World Rugby Rankings since its inception in 2003. The country hosted and won the 1995 Rugby World Cup, and won again in 2007, 2019 and 2023 - more than any other nation, despite its exclusion from the first two competitions.

As with much else in South Africa, the organisation and playing of rugby union has been entangled with politics, and racial politics in particular.

== History ==
When Canon George Ogilvie became headmaster of Diocesan College in Cape Town in 1861, he introduced the game of Winchester College football. This version of football, which included handling of the ball, is seen as the beginnings of rugby in South Africa. Soon, the young gentlemen of Cape Town joined in and the first match in South Africa took place between the "Officers of the Army" and the "Gentlemen of the Civil Service" at Green Point in Cape Town on 23 August 1862 and ended as a 0–0 draw. The local press reported a series of football matches between scratch sides "Town v Suburbs" or "Home v Colonial-born".

Around 1875, rugby began to be played in the Cape colony; the same year the first rugby (as opposed to Winchester football) club, Hamilton, was formed in Sea Point, Cape Town. Former England international William Henry Milton arrived in Cape Town in 1878. He joined the Villagers club and started playing and preaching rugby. By the end of that year Cape Town had all but abandoned the Winchester game in favour of rugby. British colonists helped spread the game through the Eastern Cape, Natal and along the gold and diamond routes to Kimberley and Johannesburg. British troops would also play a key role in spreading the game throughout the country.

Rugby union was introduced to South Africa by British colonists, including miners from rugby union stronghold Cornwall Rugby union in Cornwall (before 1900), and began to be played in the Cape colony around 1875. In 1883, the Stellenbosch club was formed in the predominantly Boer farming district outside Cape Town and rugby was enthusiastically adopted by the young Boer farmers. As British and Boer migrated to the interior they helped spread the game from the Cape colony through the Eastern Cape, and Natal, and along the gold and diamond routes to Kimberley and Johannesburg.

The game was strong enough in the Western Cape for the Western Province Rugby Football Union to be formed that same year; Griqualand West followed in 1886; Eastern Province in 1888; Transvaal in 1889 and in 1889 the South African Rugby Board was founded. Kimberley was the founding city of the South Africa Rugby Football Board in 1889.

In 1889 the first nationwide tournament was held at Kimberley, with the Western Province (rugby team) prevailing over Griqualand West, Eastern Province and Transvaal.

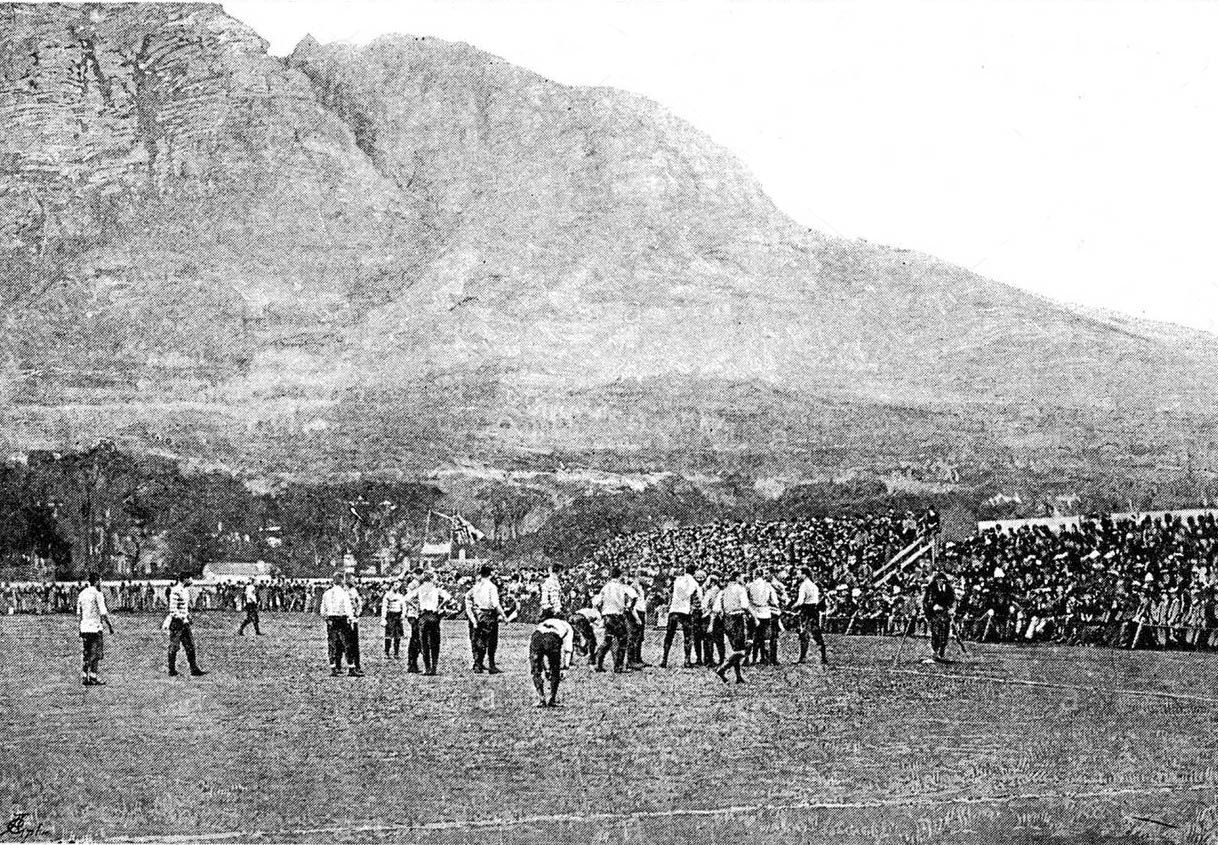
British Isles v Cape Colony, the first match of the British Isles tour of South Africa in 1891

The first-ever tour of the British Isles by a team from Southern Africa (drawing on players from the then independent republics of the Transvaal and the Orange Free State, and the British colonies of the Cape and Natal) took place in 1891, with the trip financially underwritten by (the British arch imperialist) Cecil Rhodes of the Cape and (the resolutely Boer) President Kruger of the Transvaal Republic. Seven years later Britain was at war with the Boer republics, and during the Boer war British troops would play a key role in entrenching the game throughout the country, and games amongst the Boer population in prisoner of war camps popularised the game further.

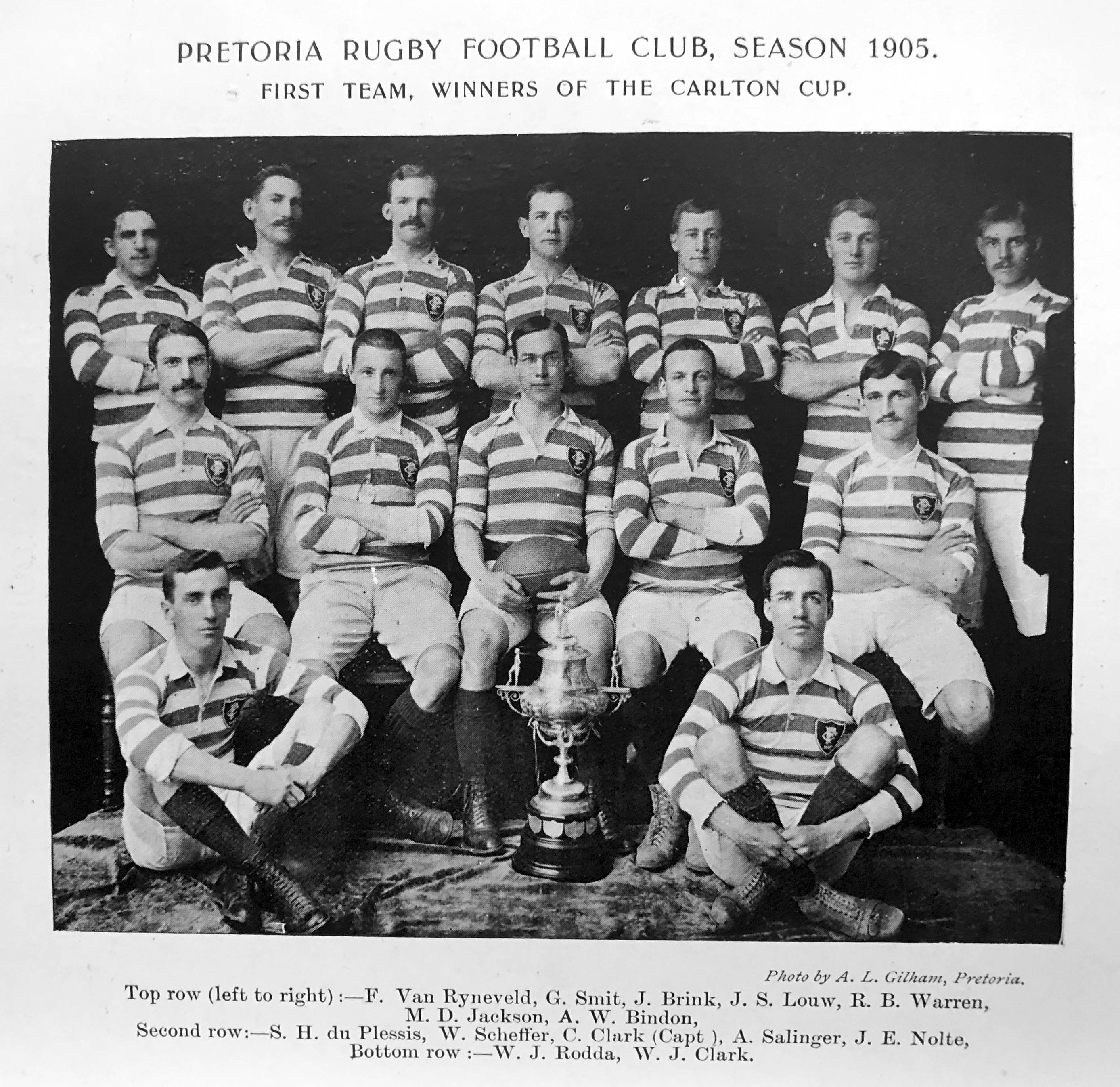
The Pretoria RFC team of 1905

From the early years the game had been enthusiastically and passionately adopted by coloured and black populations in the Cape colony, and the Eastern Cape in particular, but rugby organisation (under the South Africa Coloured Rugby Board formed in 1896) and teams were kept segregated with discrimination against black and coloured players and little government funding.

Even before the 1948 elections in South Africa in which the apartheid government came to power and legislated systematically along racial lines, foreign sporting teams going to South Africa had felt it necessary to exclude non-white players. New Zealand rugby teams in particular had done this, and the exclusion of George Nēpia and Jimmy Mill from the 1928 All Blacks tour, and the dropping of "Ranji" Wilson from the New Zealand Army team nine years before that, had attracted little comment at the time.

From 1960, international criticism of apartheid in particular grew in the wake of "The Wind of Change" speech by the British Prime Minister, Macmillan, and the Sharpeville massacre near Johannesburg in South Africa. From then onward, the Springboks, perceived as prominent representatives of apartheid South Africa, were increasingly isolated internationally.

Coming shortly after the Soweto riots as it did, the 1976 All Blacks tour of South Africa attracted international condemnation and 28 countries boycotted the 1976 Summer Olympics in protest. The next year, in 1977, the Commonwealth signed the Gleneagles Agreement, which discouraged any sporting contact with South Africa. A planned 1979 Springbok tour of France was stopped by the French government, which announced that it was inappropriate for South African teams to tour France, and after the 1981 Springbok tour of New Zealand went ahead in defiance of the Gleneagles Agreement, South Africa was banned by the International Rugby Board from international competition until such time as apartheid ended. Despite the Gleneagles Agreement, in July 1982, Hong Kong Rugby Football Union Vice-President A. D. C "Tokkie" Smith brought the first ever mixed-race team on tour in South Africa.

From 1990 to 1994 the legal apparatus of apartheid was abolished, and in 1992 the Springboks were readmitted to international rugby. On 23 March 1992 the non-racial South African Rugby Union and the South African Rugby Board were merged to form the South African Rugby Football Union. The unified body changed its name in 2005 to the current South African Rugby Union.

SA Rugby celebrated 100 years of test rugby in 2006 and unveiled a new logo at a function at Kings Park Stadium in Durban. Celebrations continued later in the year, with two tests against England at Twickenham.

== Present ==
According to World Rugby, South Africa has 434,219 registered players broken down into: 157,980 pre-teen males; 121,879 teen males; 143,722 senior males (total male players 423,581); 1,653 pre-teen females; 5,504 teen females; 3,481 senior females (total female players 10,638). However, this is an old report.

There are 4,074 referees.

== Governing body ==
From 1990 to 1991 the legal apparatus of apartheid was abolished, and in 1992 the Springboks were readmitted to international rugby. On 23 March 1992 the non-racial South African Rugby Union and the South African Rugby Board (the government-approved white-only governing body) were merged to form the South African Rugby Football Union. The unified body changed its name in 2005 to the current South African Rugby Union.

== National team ==
The national team are known as the Springboks. The jersey is a dark myrtle green with a gold collar and a logo of a leaping springbuck and a protea.

The "Springbok" nickname and logo dates from the 1906/7 tour of Britain. The logo was not restricted to the white team alone though, the first coloured national team used the springbok in 1939 and the first black team in 1950.

== National sevens team ==
South Africa also occupies an important place in the sevens version of the sport. The country hosts one of the 10 events in the annual Sevens World Series. From 2001 through 2010, it was held at Outeniqua Park in George, a community along the Garden Route in the Western Cape. Starting in 2011, the tournament moved to the Eastern Cape and the much larger Nelson Mandela Bay Stadium in Port Elizabeth, and moved again in 2015 to Cape Town and Cape Town Stadium. The Cape Town Sevens has since become one of the biggest annual events on the South African sporting calendar, attracting numerous local and international visitors over the course of the weekend on which it is held. South Africa's national team, known as Springbok Sevens, and also nicknamed "Blitzbokke", have become one of the sport's top national sides, as evidenced by their victory in the 2008–09 IRB Sevens World Series and recently in both 2016–2017 and 2017–18. Cape Town is scheduled to host the 2022 Rugby World Cup Sevens.

== Domestic competitions ==
=== Men's competitions ===
==== Super Rugby ====
Super Rugby is an international provincial competition initially featuring teams from New Zealand, Australia and South Africa. South Africa withdrew its franchises in September 2020.

The Super 10 (predecessor to Super Rugby) was won in 1993 by Transvaal but the Super Rugby competition was not won by a South African team until 2007, when South Africa provided the two finalists, the Bulls and the Sharks. The Bulls scored a last-second win over the Sharks in the final. The Bulls went on to win the last two titles under the Super 14 format, handing the Chiefs of New Zealand a record 61–17 thrashing in the 2009 final and defeating the Stormers in the 2010 final.

==== United Rugby Championship ====
Four South African teams have been playing in the United Rugby Championship since the 2021–22 season, alongside teams from Ireland, Wales, Italy and Scotland. The teams are:

- Bulls
- Lions
- Sharks
- Stormers

Prior to that, the Cheetahs and Southern Kings played during the previous version of the tournament, the Pro14, from the 2017–18 season. This followed their axing from Super Rugby after its 2017 season.

==== Currie Cup ====
The Currie Cup tournament has been the premier domestic rugby union in South Africa since its first edition in 1892. Since then, the number of teams participating in the competition varied in different seasons, with the Currie Cup trophy being awarded to the champions of the top tier. Other trophies, such as the Percy Frames Trophy, the W.V. Simkins Trophy and the South African Cup (currently awarded to the winners of the First Division), were also on offer.

==== Other competitions ====
Between 1983 and 1994, teams also competed in a knockout cup competition called the Lion Cup. There was no competition in 1995, as South African rugby adjusted to the advent of professional rugby, but in 1996, a new competition – the Bankfin Nite Series – was launched. That lasted for two seasons before being replaced by the Vodacom Cup. The Vodacom Cup was held between 1998 and 2015 and included teams from Argentina, Namibia, Kenya and the South African Limpopo province in addition to the fourteen South African provincial sides. The Vodacom Cup was discontinued in 2015 and replaced for 2016 with a one-off expanded Currie Cup before its permanent replacement, the Rugby Challenge, launched in 2017. The Challenge now includes only South African sides, plus the Namibian team that had sporadically featured in the Vodacom Cup.

Since 2008, the Varsity Cup is an annual tournament held between the top university club sides in South Africa. In 2011, a second tier known as the Varsity Shield was added to the schedule.

Non-university club sides can also compete for national honours; they compete in the annual Gold Cup competition, which was launched in 2013. It was preceded by a similar competition called the National Club Championships.

There are also several youth competitions; all the provincial sides compete annually in the Under-21 and Under-19 Provincial Championships. The premier schools competition is known as the Craven Week (there are two editions of this competition – an Under-18 competition for high schools and an Under-13 competition for primary schools), and the other national youth weeks are the Under-18 Academy Week, the Under-16 Grant Khomo Week and the Under-18 LSEN Week for Learners with Special Educational Needs.

=== Women's competitions ===
==== Women's Premier Division ====
The Women's Premier Division was first played in 2003. The Bulls Daisies became the country's first professional team in 2023.

The Women's First Division is the second tier competition.

== International competitions ==
=== Rugby World Cup ===
South Africa did not take part in the first two World Cups, held in 1987 and 1991, as they were still under an international boycott due to apartheid. South Africa however did play an important role in the first World Cup; despite knowing that they would not be able to participate, the delegates voted in favor and provided the swing vote for the World Cup.

Since then South Africa have won the World Cup four times, in 1995 in their first appearance when they also hosted the event, and again in 2007, 2019 and 2023. The 1995 tournament concluded with then President Nelson Mandela (at the time described as the world's most famous former political prisoner), wearing a Springbok jersey and matching baseball cap, presenting the trophy to the South Africa's captain François Pienaar (a young Afrikaner). Given the political history of South Africa, the moment is seen as one of the most emotional in the sport's history and symbolic of reconciliation and the birth of a new, free South Africa as a "rainbow nation".

In 2007 the Springboks repeated their 1995 feat winning the 2007 World Cup by defeating England at Stade de France. In the 2011 World Cup, the Boks only managed to reach the quarter-final stage where they were beaten by Australia.

South Africa won the Rugby World Cup for a third time in 2019, once again defeating England, 32–12 in the final in Yokohama.

South Africa won the Rugby World Cup for a fourth time in 2023, once again defeating New Zealand at Stade de France., 12–11 in the final. Upon winning the fourth time, the Springboks became the only team to have held 4 World Cup titles and only the second team to win back-to-back championships.

=== Tri Nations and The Rugby Championship ===
The Tri Nations was an annual competition involving New Zealand, Australia, and South Africa. Previously this involved each country playing one home and one away game against both other countries. From 2006 the competition was expanded with each nation playing both the other nations three times (except in Rugby World Cup years). Since Argentina's strong performances in the 2007 World Cup a number of commentators believed they should join the Tri-Nations. This was firstly proposed for the 2008 tournament, then for 2010, but eventually this prospect came much closer to reality after the 2009 Tri Nations tournament, when SANZAR (South Africa, New Zealand and Australian Rugby) extended an official invitation to the Unión Argentina de Rugby (UAR), to join a new revised Four Nations tournament in 2012. This long-anticipated move was generally met with great approval from all parties involved. The invitation was however subject to certain conditions, like the guaranteed availability of the top Puma players, most of whom play highly paid professional club rugby in Europe at present.

With Argentina's entry ultimately confirmed, the Tri Nations was renamed The Rugby Championship. The involvement of the Pumas caused the competition to revert to a pure home-and-away series.

The Freedom Cup (against New Zealand) and the Mandela Challenge Plate (against Australia) are competed for as part of The Rugby Championship.

=== Africa Cup ===
The Africa Cup is an annual competition involving ten African nations. South Africa sent its top amateurs to this competition up until 2007.
