= American Cougars =

American Rugby Union

- Unions: USA Rugby
- Nickname(s): Cougars
- Founded: 1978; 47 years ago
Team kit

The American Cougars (also known as the USA Cougars or United States Cougars) is a rugby union team from the United States. It is the only rugby union team from the United States ever to beat a reigning Currie Cup championship team in South Africa. A combined and invitational side from the United States, the Cougars toured South Africa and Zimbabwe in 1978. The team was coached by Ray Cornbill, coach of the Eagles during the 1970s and 1980s. The squad comprised 25 players from 20 clubs, including 3 from Santa Monica Rugby Football Club, 2 each from Chicago Lions RFC, Washington DC RFC, and UCLA RFC.

== Matches ==
The Cougars played six games in South Africa: against Natal, Combined Universities, Griquas, Northern Transvaal, South African Gazelles and Rhodesia, and won once.

On 12 August 1978 they lost 12–44 to a racially mixed South African Country Districts XV side at East London. Some 5,500 spectators watched as future Springbok Errol Tobias contributed two tries to the Districts' total and aided in the scoring of two others. By half-time the Districts were ahead 24–3. Cougars' wing Tommy Smith, usually a fly-half, "registered a spectacular score" that was converted by fullback Dennis Jablonski. Jablonski added two penalty kicks to complete the visitors' score.

Four days later the Cougars faced a combined Universities of Stellenbosch and Cape Town side on 16 August 1978 at Cape Town.

The highlight of the tour was the Cougars' 18–15 win on 19 August 1978 over Northern Transvaal, who had won the Currie Cup in 1977 and went on to retain their title in 1978.

The tour closed with an international match on 28 August 1978, a 32–15 loss to a Rhodesia side that featured Ray Mordt.

== 1978 touring squad to southern Africa ==
Colours: Red, White & Blue Hoops

Coach: Ray Cornbill

Manager: Keith Seaber

| Player | Position | Club |
|---|---|---|
| Joe Sheitlin | Fullback | Minneapolis RFC |
| Dennis Jablonski | Fullback | Santa Monica RFC |
| Mike Hodgins | Wing | Atlanta Renegades RFC |
| Vic Clark | Wing | Kansas City Blues RFC |
| Tommy Smith | Wing | Washington D.C. RFC |
| Dan Wack | Centre | Washington D.C. RFC |
| Boyd Morrison | Centre | Louisiana State Univ RFC |
| Mike Fanucchi | Centre | Old Gaels RFC - California |
| Ian Gunn | Fly-half | Old Puget Sound Beach RFC |
| Steve Gray | Fly-half | UCLA RFC |
| Dick Cooke | Scrum-half | University of Iowa RFC |
| Kirk Andrus | Scrum-half | Santa Rosa RFC |
| Gary Wilson | Prop | Chicago Lions RFC |
| Mickey Ording | Prop | Olympic Club Rugby, San Francisco |
| Mike Lancaster | Prop | Northern Virginia RFC |
| Bruce Henderson | Prop | Wichita RFC |
| Jessie Lopez | Hooker | Fort Wayne RFC |
| Jeff Hollings | Hooker | Old Blues RFC |
| Jerry Kelleher | Lock | Santa Monica RFC |
| John Fowler | Lock | UCLA RFC |
| Nick Fedorenko | Lock | Chicago Lions RFC |
| Jeff Lombard | Flanker | Chuckanut Bay RFC |
| Clarence Culpepper (capt.) | Flanker | Roanoke RC |
| Tom Selfridge | 8th Man | Schenectady Reds RFC |
| Brad Andrews | 8th Man | Santa Monica RFC |

== See also ==
- Cougar selection tournament
