= South African Country Districts XV =

South African Country Districts
Team kit

The South African Country Districts XV was an invitational rugby union side selected to play against touring international teams. In one of its first guises, the Districts side lost 32–12 against the touring British Isles' Barbarians at Potchefstroom, on 24 May 1969. Barbarians' touring party included eight future or former British and Irish Lions with the likes of Mike Gibson, Sandy Arneil, Bob Taylor, John Pullin and John O'Shea having toured the Republic in 1968.

In 1978 and 1980 the team was multi-racial in composition. The Districts' multi-racial predecessor was the South African Invitation XV which on 7 June 1975 beat the French at Newlands in Cape Town by 18 points to 3.

In August 1978 the Country Districts XV played the touring American Cougars at the Border Rugby Union Grounds in East London before 5,500 spectators, winning 44-12.

As one of four games played prior to the Currie Cup final of 1979, a Country Districts XV defeated the multi racial South African Barbarians side (shorn of its WP forward contingent) 29-13 in Cape Town prior to their departure on their UK tour in October.

== 1980 Match v Lions ==
On Wednesday 4 June 1980 the South African Country Districts XV team lost 7-27 at Windhoek's South-West Stadium to the Lions on their tour of South Africa. A crowd of 9,000 saw replacement Charles Williams score a try and fly-half Errol Tobias add a penalty to complete the Districts' score. Jim Renwick, Gareth Williams, Clive Woodward and Colm Tucker scored a try each for the visitors, while Gareth Davies added 11 points through a conversion and three penalties.

Lineups:

| SA Districts | Position | Lions |
|---|---|---|
| Solomon Mhlaba | Fullback | Bruce Hay (capt) |
| E Durrheim | Wing | Clive Woodward |
| J Els | Centre | Ray Gravell |
| Hennie Shields | Centre | Jim Renwick |
| Brendan Venter | Wing | Peter Morgan |
| Errol Tobias | Fly-half | Gareth Davies |
| JP Venter | Scrum-half | John Robbie |
| J Volschenk | Prop | Ian Stephens |
| Noel van Rensburg (capt) | Hooker | Peter Wheeler |
| D Mather | Prop | Phil Orr |
| A Botha | Lock | Alan Tomes |
| R Meyer | Lock | Allan Martin |
| M Cushe | Flanker | John Beattie |
| Hendrik Schrader | Flanker | Colm Tucker |
| J Wolfaardt | 8th Man | Gareth Williams |
| Charles Williams | Replacement | |

On 26 May 1981 a Country Districts B XV recorded a 17-16 victory in Wellington against the touring Irish side whilst the following year they were defeated 33-24 by the second South American Jaguars touring side.

The Country Districts side played against both the 1984 touring English and South American Jaguar sides. The team was drawn from players competing in the Sport Pienaar Cup, losing both fixtures 33-12 and 30-18 respectively.

== See also ==
- 1980 British Lions tour to South Africa
