= Morgan Cushe =

- Born: Morgan Cushe

Rugby union career
- Position: No. 8 or Flank
International career
Years	Team	Apps	(Points)
1974, '76	Leopards	2	
1975, '76	South African Invitation XV	2	
Coaching career
- Years: Team
- Swallows Rugby Club

Morgan Cushe (died 5 October 2013) was a black South African rugby union player from Uitenhage who played for the Leopards as a loose forward. The Leopards was the representative side of the black South African African Rugby Board, one of three segregated unions that governed rugby in apartheid South Africa.

During the Lions' unbeaten tour of South Africa in 1974, Cushe captained the Leopards at eighthman against Willie John McBride's side at Sisa Dukashe Stadium in Mdantsane, the black township near East London. In accordance with apartheid laws, white spectators had to apply for a special permit to attend the game. Despite the Lions beating the Leopards 58–10, Cushe produced play that was " 'clearly good enough to be considered... if South Africa were to hold mixed trials' ".

Cushe was in the South African Invitation XV that beat the touring French side of Richard Astre 18–3 at Newlands in Cape Town on 7 June 1975. The winning side included John Noble, Turkey Shields, Toto Tsotsobe and Errol Tobias. Selected by Danie Craven, the team was the first official multi-racial team to face an international side on South African soil.

Cushe faced the visiting All Blacks twice on their 1976 tour of South Africa.

He was included as a flank for a South African Invitation XV team for their match on 10 July 1976 before a crowd of 35,000 at Newlands. The team included eight future Springboks, as well as players of colour such as fullback Ronnie Louw, prop Broadness Cona and wing John Noble. The All Blacks fielded Bryan Williams and Sid Going, who was pressured by Cushe. The game was a close one, with the Invitation side losing 24–31. Less than a week later the Soweto uprising erupted.

On 31 August 1976 Cushe represented the Leopards against the visiting All Blacks at Sisha Dukashe Stadium. The match took place under tight security surveillance by the South African Defence Force and the Police. The All Blacks had won over the local school children during their training run at the stadium the previous day. Cushe was noted for his tackling as the All Blacks won the match 31–0 in a game remembered for the negative play by the Leopards.

Later Cushe and his brother Meshack helped to coach the Swallows Rugby Club in Uitenhage. Swallows turned 100 years old in 2011.

He died on 5 October 2013 after a short illness.

== Appearances vs international sides ==
Team	Opposition	Result	Position	Tries	Date	Venue
Leopards	British and Irish Lions	0–58	No. 8		9 July 1974	Sisa Dukashe Stadium, Mdantsane
SA Invitation XV	France	18–3			7 June 1975	Newlands Stadium, Cape Town
SA Invitation XV	New Zealand	24–31	Flank		10 July 1976	Newlands Stadium, Cape Town
Leopards	New Zealand	0–31			31 August 1976	Sisa Dukashe Stadium, Mdantsane

== See also ==
- Leopards
