= SARB =

SARB, Sarb or sarb may refer to:

- Ancient South Arabian script (ISO 15924 code)
- South African Reserve Bank, central bank of South Africa
- South African Rugby Board, former rugby union governing body of white South Africans
