= John Noble (rugby union) =

John Noble is a former South African rugby union player and one of four players of colour to be included in the first multi-racial team to play a foreign team on South African soil in 1975. Noble also represented the South African Rugby Football Federation and its representative side, the Proteas.

Noble was selected by Danie Craven for the South African Invitation XV to play a touring French national side. The team, which also included Turkey Shields, Toto Tsotsobe and Morgan Cushe, beat the French on 7 June 1975 at Newlands in Cape Town by 18 points to 3. Playing on the wing, Noble scored a try after following up and diving on a grubber kick by Dawie Snyman.
