= Solomon Mhlaba =

Solomon Mhlaba is a former rugby union fullback, one of only four players of colour, and one of two black African players, to be selected for South African sides during the late 1970s and early 1980s.

In 1978, Mhlaba was invited to attend the Springbok training camp. He was selected for the South African Barbarians twice, touring with the team in Britain in 1979. In 1980 he played against the touring Lions team twice, once with the Barbarians, and once as member of the South African Country Districts XV.

He accompanied mining teams on local and overseas trips.

In 1992, he qualified as a referee with the Southeastern Transvaal Referees' Association while working for SASOL at Secunda.

== See also ==
- 1980 British Lions tour to South Africa
