= 2016 Christchurch mayoral election =

New Zealand mayoral election

- 8 October 2016
- Turnout: 90,137 (37.4%)
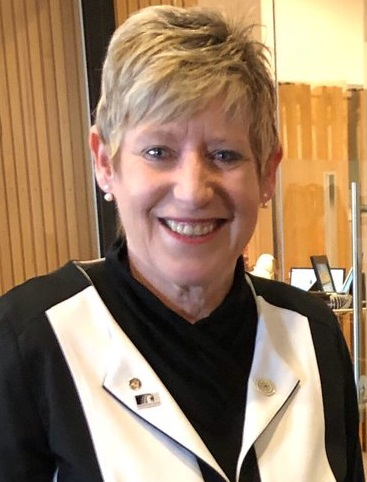

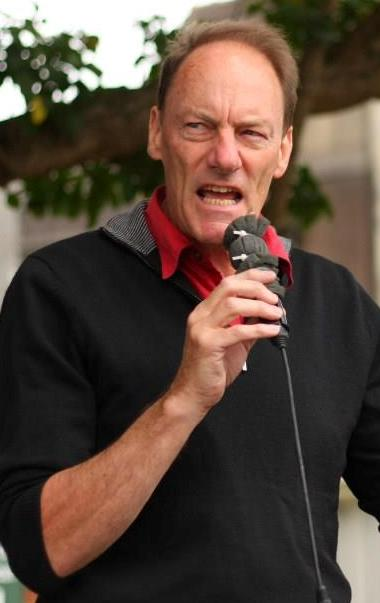
Candidate	Lianne Dalziel	John Minto
Party	Independent	Keep Our Assets
Popular vote	75,524	13,117
Percentage	83.86	14.57
Mayor before election
Lianne Dalziel
Elected mayor
Lianne Dalziel

The 2016 Christchurch mayoral election was part of the New Zealand local elections held on 8 October. The incumbent mayor, former Labour MP and government Minister Lianne Dalziel, who was first elected in the 2013 mayoral election was reelected, winning a commanding 83.9% of formal votes cast in the poll. However New Zealand's local government elections in 2016 were characterized by a nationwide low participation rate which saw only 41.8% of enrolled voters cast a ballot in the election. Christchurch's turnout rate was particularly low with only 38.3% of enrolled voters actually voting, down from 52.2% in 2010.

== Candidates ==
There were three candidates:

- Lianne Dalziel (Best for Christchurch), incumbent, who formally declared her intention to run for a second term on 25 April.
- Tubby Hansen (Economic Euthenics), perennial candidate
- John Minto (Keep Our Assets), veteran political activist, who announced his candidacy on 12 July

The left-leaning ticket, The People's Choice, represented on the outgoing city council by six councillors, declared that they would not stand a candidate in opposition to Dalziel – and councillor Paul Lonsdale, who came second in the 2013 mayoral campaign, acknowledged that Dalziel had done well in her first term and that he would not challenge her.

== Debates ==
The Press hosted a debate between Dalziel and Minto at the Cardboard Cathedral on 20 September, moderated by its editor, Joanna Norris. The following day, Guyon Espiner interviewed Dalziel and Minto on RNZ National's Morning Report.

Generation Zero hosted a debate at the University of Canterbury's Ilam campus on 22 September 2016.

== Results ==
2016 Christchurch mayoral election
Party	Candidate	Votes	%	±%
Best for Christchurch	Lianne Dalziel	75,524	83.86	+12.29
Keep Our Assets	John Minto	13,117	14.57	+14.57
Economic Euthenics	Tubby Hansen	1,414	1.57	+1.21
Majority		62,407	69.30	+20.48
Total valid votes		90,055	99.91	
Informal votes		82	0.09	−0.10
Turnout		90,137	37.4	−5.2
Registered electors		241,210		

=== By ward ===
	Dalziel		Minto		Hansen		Total valid votes
Ward	#	%	#	%	#	%	#
Banks Peninsula	2,395	78.96	612	20.18	26	0.86	3,033
Burwood	5,171	86.69	718	12.04	76	1.27	5,965
Cashmere	5,633	81.95	1158	16.85	83	1.21	6,874
Central	2,986	76.68	838	21.52	70	1.80	3,894
Coastal	4,694	80.69	1037	17.83	86	1.48	5,817
Fendalton	6,066	88.65	671	9.81	106	1.55	68,43
Halswell	6,039	87.85	715	10.40	120	1.75	6,874
Harewood	5,670	87.91	693	10.74	87	1.35	6,450
Heathcote	6,037	82.34	1208	16.48	87	1.19	7,332
Hornby	4,285	82.40	803	15.44	112	2.15	5,200
Innes	4,104	83.01	767	15.51	73	1.48	4,944
Linwood	4,015	78.79	987	19.37	94	1.84	5,096
Papanui	5,161	86.09	728	12.14	106	1.77	5,995
Riccarton	3,514	82.82	628	14.80	101	2.38	4,243
Spreydon	4,363	82.35	852	16.08	83	1.57	5,298
Waimairi	5,391	86.99	702	11.33	104	1.68	6,197
Total	75,524	83.39	13,117	15.03	1,414	1.58	90,055
