= 1978 National Rugby Championships =

U.S. sports championship games

Tournament details
- Tournament format(s): Various
- Date: 1978

Tournament statistics

Final

The 1978 National Rugby Championships were a series of tournaments organized to determine a national champion in several divisions for United States rugby teams. The divisions included College, Women's club, and Interterritorial.

== College ==
The 1978 College championship took place from February 4–5 at LSU's Parade Grounds in Baton Rouge, Louisiana. Palmer College of Chiropractic were the champions. Palmer had previously won championships in 1972 and 1973 and were runners-up in 1976. Palmer won three matches in the series to win the title.
Championship Bracket

Quarter-finals
February 4 - Baton Rouge, LA
Palmer	20
Georgia	0
February 4 - Baton Rouge, LA
Kentucky	3
Oklahoma	0
February 4 - Baton Rouge, LA
Miami (OH)	11
Florida	3
February 4 - Baton Rouge, LA
LSU	6
Texas A&M	0

Semi-finals
February 4 – Baton Rouge, LA
Palmer	20
Kentucky	0
February 4 – Baton Rouge, LA
LSU	22
Miami (OH)	3

Final
February 5 – Baton Rouge, LA
Palmer	19
LSU	4
Third place
February 5 – Baton Rouge, LA
Kentucky	10
Miami (OH)	0

Consolation Bracket

Semi-finals
February 4 – Baton Rouge, LA
Georgia	30
Oklahoma	16
February 4 – Baton Rouge, LA
Texas A&M	18
Florida	8

Fifth place
February 5 – Baton Rouge, LA
Georgia	4
Texas A&M	10
Seventh place
February 5 – Baton Rouge, LA
Oklahoma	13
Florida	4

=== Final ===
5 February 1978

Palmer	19–4	LSU
Try: Duncan Hales 30'; Duncan Hales; Duncan Hales 70' c Con: Mike Halliday; Pen: Mike Halliday 5'		Try: Tommy Martin

Baton Rouge
Attendance: 2000
Referee: Dr. Peter Jones

== ITT ==
The Inter Territorial Tournament involved the four regional rugby unions comprising the United States RFU: Pacific Coast RFU, Western RFU, Midwest RFU, and the Eastern Rugby Union. The region teams are formed from selected players from the sub regional rugby unions. Subsequently, the USA Eagles are selected from the four regional teams after the ITT concludes. The 1978 edition was sponsored by Michelob and played as a round robin from June 10–11 on Aviation Field at Forest Park in St. Louis, Missouri.

Results:

10 June 1978
9:30AM

Midwest	17–12	Western
Try: Paul Pauluzzi ? Mike Halliday; Drop: Mike Halliday		Try: ? c Con: Bennett; Pen: Bennett 2

St. Louis, MO

10 June 1978

Eastern	7–24	Pacific Coast
Try: Mike Liscovitz; Drop: Mike Hodgins		Try: Duncanson c Chipman ? c Niebauer; Duncanson; Con: Armstrong

St. Louis, MO

10 June 1978

Midwest	13–9	Pacific Coast
Try: Paul Pauluzzi c Gary Wilson; Con: Perkins; Drop: 15' Perkins		Try: Mike Fanucci c Con: Jablonski; Pen: Jablonski

St. Louis, MO

10 June 1978

Eastern	41–8	Western
Try: Morrison; 45' Cook; Peter Brock c Selfridge; Hodgins; Morrison c Tommy Smith c Con: Cook; Pen: Cook		Try: Arnold; Culbertson

St. Louis, MO

11 June 1978

Pacific Coast	44–6	Western
Try: Jeff Lombard; Chipman c John Fowler c Chipman; Walton; Walton; Jensen c Gunn; Jensen; Con: Larsen 3 Gunn		Pen: Bennett 2

St. Louis, MO

11 June 1978

Eastern	27–16	Midwest
Try: Hodgins; Mike Sherlock; Swords c Stone ? Con: Cook; Pen: Cook 2 Drop: Cook		Try: Scheitlin c ? Con: Perkins; Pen: Perkins; Drop: Perkins

St. Louis, MO

Team		W	L	F	A
1	Pacific Coast Grizzlies	2	1	77	27
2	Eastern Colonials	2	1	75	48
3	Midwest Thunderbirds	2	1	46	48
4	Western Mustangs	0	3	27	102

== Women's Club ==
The 1978 Women's National Rugby Classic for club teams was co-sponsored by the Chicago Women's Rugby Football Club and Michelob beer. The teams invited needed to have won a major regional title and have a winning record. The games were played at Lion's Park in Mount Prospect, Illinois. The team from Portland, Maine won the championship with four shutouts: 3–0 over Denver Blues in the first round, 24–0 over Houston Boars in the second round, then 4–0 against Chicago, and finally 18–0 against Madison, Wisconsin. Chicago took third place with a 4–0 win over Florida State after three overtimes.

Semi-finals
September 2 – Mount Prospect, IL
Portland	4
Chicago	0
September 2 – Mount Prospect, IL
Madison	4
Florida State	0

Final
September 3 – Mount Prospect, IL
Portland	18
Madison	0
Third place
September 3 – Mount Prospect, IL
Chicago	4
Florida State	0

Champions: Portland(ME) Women's Rugby Club. Qualified as New England Champions.
Record: 10–1–2
Coaching Staff: Rocky Frenzilli, Ricky Scala(Aide), Peter Gillis(Aide)
Roster: Sondra Spiers, Denise Dimitre, Pat Cribby, Kim Berry, Janet Muccino, Susan Adams, Brenda Costello, Mary Beth Staid, Reta Brown Flaherty, Brenda Swallow, Cheryl Ring, Ann Chippfield, Sue Malcolm, Marie Gagne, Amy Belliveau, Debbie Selleck (captain), Ann Chute, Mary Gouletand, Sue Lawler.

== Monterey National Championships ==
Program cover for 1978 tournament.

The 1978 Monterey National Rugby Championship was the 20th edition of the tournament and was considered to be the de facto national championship. This event took place at Pebble Beach, CA from March 25–26. The tournament MVP was Jeff Momsen (Old Blues), Miss Rugby winner was Nicole Parlette, Bill Armstrong of the Old Blues won the Running Drop Kick contest while Brian Lowe of UC Davis was runner-up. The Old Blues of Berkeley, CA went 5–0 to take first place.

First round

25 March 1978 1	Santa Monica RC	3-0	UC Davis	Pebble Beach
7:00AM				Stadium: Field 1

25 March 1978 2	Palo Alto RC	14-0	Washington State	Pebble Beach
7:00AM				Stadium: Field 2

25 March 1978 3	UC Berkeley	23-0	U. of Oregon	Pebble Beach
7:00AM				Stadium: Field 3

25 March 1978 4	Old Blue RFC (NY)	3-0	Sacramento Capitols	Pebble Beach
7:00AM				Stadium: Field 4

25 March 1978 5	James Bay Athletic Assn	12-3	Davis City RFC	Pebble Beach
7:30AM				Stadium: Field 1

25 March 1978 6	San Francisco RC	6-7	Kern County RC	Pebble Beach
7:30AM				Stadium: Field 2

25 March 1978 7	Chuckanut Bay Geoducks	0-6	Stanford	Pebble Beach
7:30AM				Stadium: Field 3

25 March 1978 8	BATS	12-3	U. of Washington	Pebble Beach
7:30AM				Stadium: Field 4

25 March 1978 9	OMBAC	13-6	Colusa County RC	Pebble Beach
8:00AM				Stadium: Field 1

25 March 1978 10	X–O RC	3-0	Los Angeles RC	Pebble Beach
8:00AM				Stadium: Field 2

25 March 1978 11	Seahawks RFC	4-3	Hawaii Harlequins	Pebble Beach
8:00AM				Stadium: Field 3

25 March 1978 12	Portland	7-4	St. Mary's College	Pebble Beach
8:00AM				Stadium: Field 4

25 March 1978 13	Old Puget Sound Beach	10-3	Monterey RC	Pebble Beach
8:30AM				Stadium: Field 1

25 March 1978 14	Newport Beach RC	4-0	Olde Gaels	Pebble Beach
8:30AM				Stadium: Field 2

25 March 1978 15	Dartmouth	0-0 (W–L p)	UC Santa Cruz	Pebble Beach
8:30AM				Stadium: Field 3

25 March 1978 16	Old Blues RC (CA)	3-0	Oregon State	Pebble Beach
8:30AM				Stadium: Field 4

Championship Bracket

Second Round; March 25
1	Santa Monica	17
16	Palo Alto	6
8	Old Blue (NY)	4
9	Cal Berkeley	18
4	BATS	3*
20	Stanford	3
5	James Bay	6
21	Kern County	0
2	Old Blues (CA)	10
15	Dartmouth	0
7	Old Puget Sound Beach	0
10	Newport Beach	10
3	OMBAC	11
14	X–O Rugby Club	10
6	Portland	9
11	Seahawks	0

Quarterfinals; March 25
1	Santa Monica	6
9	Cal Berkeley	3
4	BATS	0
5	James Bay	15
2	Old Blues (CA)	9
10	Newport Beach	0
3	OMBAC	9
6	Portland	3

Semifinals; March 25
1	Santa Monica	0
5	James Bay	4
2	Old Blues (CA)	17
3	OMBAC	3

Final; March 26
5	James Bay	9
2	Old Blues (CA)	18
Third place
1	Santa Monica	3
3	OMBAC	11

*Advanced on kicks

=== Final ===
26 March 1978
1:30PM

Old Blues	18–9	James Bay
Try: Pete Richter 2' c Dave Bateman c Con: Bill Armstrong; Pen: Bill Armstrong (2)		Pen: Barry Robbins (3)

Pebble Beach

Champions: Old Blues Rugby Club
Coach: Ron Mayes
Captain: Geoff Momsen
Roster: Steve Anderson, Bill Armstrong, Rick Bailey, Dave Bateman, Peter Burnam, Jack Clarke, John Dixon, Whit Everett, Leo Fracess, Pete Gunderson, Steve Gritch, Charlie Hextrim, Jeff Hollings, Bill McFarland, Steve Ponder, Peter Richter, Dennis Row, Vern Smith, Bill Stowers, Scott Stringer, Mark Villa, Dennis Ward, Blaine Warhurst.

5th–8th
L33	Cal Berkeley	0*
L34	BATS	0
L35	Portland	0
L36	Newport Beach	4

Fifth place
W51	Cal Berkeley	0
W52	Newport Beach	9
Seventh place
L51	BATS	20
L52	Portland	6

*Advanced on kicks

Thirteenth
Field 2 9:40AM
W55	Kern County	4
W56	Seahawks	7
Fifteenth
Field 4 12:00PM
L55	Old Blue (NY)	20
L56	Dartmouth	9

13th–16th
Field 2 3:00PM
L37	Old Blue (NY)	4
L38	Kern County	7
Field 4 3:40PM
L39	Seahawks	24
L40	Dartmouth	3

9th–16th
Field 2 12:10PM
L17	Palo Alto	12
L18	Old Blue (NY)	4
Field 3 12:50PM
L19	Stanford	33
L20	Kern County	3
Field 3 1:30PM
L21	X–O RC	11
L22	Seahawks	3
Field 4 1:00PM
L23	Old Puget Sound	10
L24	Dartmouth	0

9th–12th
Field 2 3:40PM
W37	Palo Alto	0
W38	Stanford	9
Field 3 4:10PM
W39	X–O	0
W40	Old Puget SB RC	14

Ninth
Field 2 10:50AM
W53	Stanford	8
W54	Old Puget	17
Eleventh
Field 3 12:00PM
L53	Palo Alto	18
L54	X–O	8

Consolation Bracket

Second Round; March 25
L1	UC Davis	15
L2	Washington State	0
L3	U. of Oregon	6
L4	Sacramento Capitols	16
L5	Davis City	0
L6	San Francisco	10
L7	Chuckanut Bay	10
L8	U. of Washington	0
L9	Colusa County	9
L10	Los Angeles	6
L11	Hawaii Harlequins	13
L12	Saint Mary's College	6
L13	Monterey	6
L14	Olde Gaels	7
L15	Oregon State	6
L16	UC Santa Cruz	3

Quarterfinals; March 25
W25	UC Davis	12
W26	Sacramento Capitols	3
W27	San Francisco	3
W28	Chuckanut Bay	7
W29	Colusa County	9
W30	Hawaii Harlequins	7
W31	Oregon State	3
W32	Olde Gaels	9

Semifinals; March 25
W41	UC Davis	3
W42	Chuckanut Bay	6
W43	Hawaii Harlequins	0
W44	Olde Gaels	10

17th place March 26
W57	Chuckanut Bay	26
W58	Old Gaels	3
19th place
L57	UC Davis	13
L58	Hawaii Harlequins	4

21st–24th
L41	Sacramento Capitols	6
L42	San Francisco	9
L43	Colusa County	10
L44	Oregon State	6

21st place
W59	San Francisco	6
W60	Colusa County	16
23rd place
L59	Sacramento Capitols	31
L60	Oregon State	7

29th place
Field 3 8:30AM
W63	Davis City	0
W64	UC Santa Cruz	0*
31st place
Field 4 8:30AM
L63	U. of Oregon	4
L64	St. Mary's	26

29th–32nd
Field 4 3:00PM
L45	U. of Oregon	9
L46	Davis City	13
Field 4 5:00PM
L47	St. Mary's	6
L48	UC Santa Cruz	7

25th–32nd
Field 4 11:40AM
L25	Washington State	3
L26	U. of Oregon	0
Field 4 12:20PM
L27	Davis City	4
L28	U. of Washington	6
Field 3 2:10PM
L29	Los Angeles	8
L30	Saint Mary's	0
Field 4 1:40PM
L31	UC Santa Cruz	0
L32	Monterey	3

25th–28th
Field 4 2:20PM
W45	Washington State	0
W46	U. of Washington	30
Field 4 4:20PM
W47	Los Angeles	0*
W48	Monterey	0

25th place
Field 1 8:30AM
W61	U. of Washington	10
W62	Los Angeles	0
27th place
Field 2 8:30AM
L61	Washington State	0
L62	Monterey	19

*Advanced on kicks

Exhibition match:

- B.C. Whoi Whoi (Vancouver, Canada) 4-8 Bald Eagles (San Francisco, CA)

== See also ==
- American Cougars
