= Gleneagles Agreement =

1977 Commonwealth anti-apartheid agreement

In the Gleneagles Agreement, in 1977, Commonwealth presidents and prime ministers agreed, as part of their support for the international campaign against apartheid, to discourage contact and competition between their sportsmen and sporting organisations, teams, or individuals from South Africa. The agreement was unanimously approved by the Commonwealth of Nations at a meeting at Gleneagles, Perthshire, Scotland.

The Gleneagles Agreement reinforced their commitment, embodied in the Singapore Declaration of Commonwealth Principles (1971), to oppose racism. This commitment was further strengthened by the Declaration on Racism and Racial Prejudice, adopted by Commonwealth leaders in Lusaka in 1979. The Commonwealth was a relevant body to impose a sporting ban on South Africa because several of the sports most popular among white South Africans are dominated by Commonwealth member states, for example cricket and rugby union.

== See also ==
- Sporting boycott of South Africa during the apartheid era
- Rugby union and apartheid
- 1981 South Africa rugby tour of New Zealand
- South African rebel tours
- Halt All Racist Tours
- South Africa national rugby union team
- South Africa national cricket team
