= SAARB Leopards (rugby union) =

The Leopards (also known as the African XV) were the South African African Rugby Board's representative side, which governed black rugby in apartheid South Africa. The team's name was reflected in the eponymous emblem that was worn on their rugby shirts.

== History ==
In 1972, the Leopards played against England in Port Elizabeth, losing the match 3-36. One year later, a test against the touring Italian national side in Port Elizabeth resulted in a 4-24 defeat.

The Leopards undertook the first tour abroad by a black South African rugby team when they traveled to Italy for a month during May 1974. The team was "the first South African team to tour Italy." The squad had 25 players and played in six fixtures, defeating Zebre in Milan, drawing against the Italian U23 side and losing four including a 25–10 defeat in the "test" defeat against the national side at Brescia. The latter was the only occasion when the margin of loss was by more than one score. Outside backs Toto Tsotsobe, Charles Mgweba, and Edmund Mnqatu were the team's most potent strike weapons behind the pack, allied to the goal-kicking abilities of Norman Mbiko and Peter Swartz, whilst forwards Broadness Cona, Liston Ntshongwana, Patsa Matyeshana, and Morgan Cushe played to excellent effect.

== 1974 match vs Lions ==
On 9 July 1974 the Leopards met the Lions on what would turn out to be the visitors' unbeaten tour of South Africa. The team was captained by hooker Thompson Magxala and included lock Liston Ntshongwana and Morgan Cushe at 8th Man. In their 10-56 loss to the Lions at Sisa Dukashe Stadium in Mdantsane, wing Charles Mgweba scored a try and Norman Mbiko succeeded with two penalties. Willie John McBride's side answered with 8 tries, one by scrum-half Gareth Edwards and a hat-trick by wing Tom Grace. The significance of Mgweba's try can be measured by the fact that the Springboks had not scored any tries in the two Tests that had been played against the Lions by that time.

Lineups:

Leopards	Position	Lions
Edmund Mnqatu	Fullback	Andy Irvine
Toto Tsotsobe	Wing	Tom Grace
Barrington Mnyazi	Centre	Mike Gibson
Mbulelo Matomela	Centre	Ian McGeechan
Charles Mgweba	Wing	Alan Morley
Peter Swartz	Fly-half	Phil Bennett
Norman Mbiko	Scrum-half	Gareth Edwards
Mbulelo Magosha	Prop	Sandy Carmichael
Thompson Magxala (capt)	Hooker	Ken Kennedy
V. Sonjani	Prop	Mike Burton
Liston Ntshongwana	Lock	Willie John McBride (capt)
Sid Ttakayi	Lock	Chris Ralston
Patsa Matayeshana	Flanker	Stewart McKinney
Vusumzi Nakani	Flanker	Tommy David
Morgan Cushe	8th Man	Andy Ripley
	Replacement	Roger Uttley

== France ==
Many of the 1974 Leopard team featured against the touring French side of June 1975 when the teams met in Mdantsane, East London in the Eastern Cape. The French emerged as comfortable winners, 39-9. The first official South African multi-racial team to play a foreign national side was the Invitation XV which included SARB's Toto Tsotsobe and Morgan Cushe. The Invitation XV beat the French at Newlands 18-3.

== All Blacks ==
The touring All Blacks were the fifth touring overseas side to play against the Leopards. The fixture in late August 1976 saw the New Zealanders running out comfortable winners 31-0 in Mdantsane. The Leopards side still contained seven of the line up featured against the 1974 British Isles side.

1979 saw the Leopards play fixtures against the Middlesex RFC side, undertaking their Centenary Tour to South Africa during May–June (including latter-day Springbok coach Nick Mallett -then at Richmond- in their squad) and they also drew 18-18 against the touring Newport squad in August.

== British and Irish Lions ==
A SARA XV, nominally a Leopards XV, recorded a second defeat at the hands of the British and Irish Lions of 1980 by a margin of 6-28. Cushe, who had played in the corresponding 1974 fixture, captained the side. The team featured a smattering of white Northern Transvaal and Western Province players in accordance with the Lions' expressed wish to play multiracial sides, departing from what some at the time considered its African XV origins.
