= Charles Williams (rugby union) =

Charles Williams is a former South African rugby union player who represented the Proteas against the All Blacks (1976). He was also selected in 1979 for the South African Barbarians, the first multi-racial South African side to tour Britain.

On 4 June 1980 he was in the South African Country Districts XV team that lost 27–7 at South-West Stadium to the Lions on their tour of South Africa. Although selected as a replacement, Williams was brought on and scored the District's sole try. The Lions' team included Clive Woodward, John Robbie, and Gareth Davies.
