= Tommy Smith (rugby union) =

US international rugby union player

Tommy Smith is a former rugby union player who represented the United States in 15s and 7s rugby before becoming the coach of the US sevens team in 1999. Smith played, captained, and coached the US National team and has been a member of the U.S. Rugby Hall of Fame since his 2017 induction.

== USA Rugby ==
Smith was awarded the Leslie Williams Award for "Best and Fairest Player" at the 1986 Hong Kong Sevens tournament, joining past recipients Jonah Lomu, Waisale Serevi and Mark Ella. In 1997 Tommy was named to the All Time All World 7's Hong Kong team at scrum half. He made 45 appearances for the U.S. national sevens team, and captained the side 19 times. In 15s, Tommy played wing, fullback, fly-half, and scrum half for the U.S. Eagles. He coached the United States national rugby sevens team from 1999 to 2001, at the beginning of the "World Series of 7s".

Career Highlights

1988 vs Canada Plate Championship (American Football passing try)

1988 Melrose 7s (American Football penalty play)

1986 Hong Kong 7s 80m try (“Best and Fairest” in tourney)

1986 Hong Kong 7s vs Japan (semi finals victory)

== College and club rugby ==
As a player, captain, and coach he spent a decade at UCLA from 1980 to 1990. Tommy was inducted into the UCLA Rugby Hall of Fame in January, 2018.

Tommy played, captained, and coached for Santa Monica Rugby Club starting in 1978 through 2011 periodically. Tommy was inducted into the Santa Monica Rugby Hall of Fame in March, 2018.

In 2007, Tommy coached Alameda Youth Rugby club and traveled to San Diego to attend the US Sevens at Petco Park. The team also participated in a 12U rugby tournament against youth teams from Southern California.

In 2011 he was the coach of the sevens team at the Santa Monica Rugby Club.

Tommy also coached at UC Berkeley. As the Pacific Coast Grizzlies captain and coach, the team won 2 National Championships in 1990 and 1991.

== Baseball career ==
Smith was drafted by the Texas Rangers out of Walter Johnson High School (Bethesda, MD) in 1974. He played shortstop for 3 seasons with the Ranger's minor league affiliates.
