= Workers' Charter =

Political movement in New Zealand

Workers' Charter was a broad-based, left-wing movement active in New Zealand, which produced a monthly newspaper of the same name. The paper's editor is well known New Zealand socialist and anti-racist John Minto, and its contributors range across the left wing spectrum- anarchists, revolutionary socialists, left wing reformists and trade union activists all contribute.
