= Halt All Racist Tours =

New Zealand protest group

Halt All Racist Tours (HART) was a protest group set up in New Zealand in 1969 to protest against rugby union tours to and from South Africa. Founding member Trevor Richards served as president for its first 10 years, with fellow founding member John Minto then serving as president until South Africa dismantled apartheid in the early 1990s.

== Chronology ==
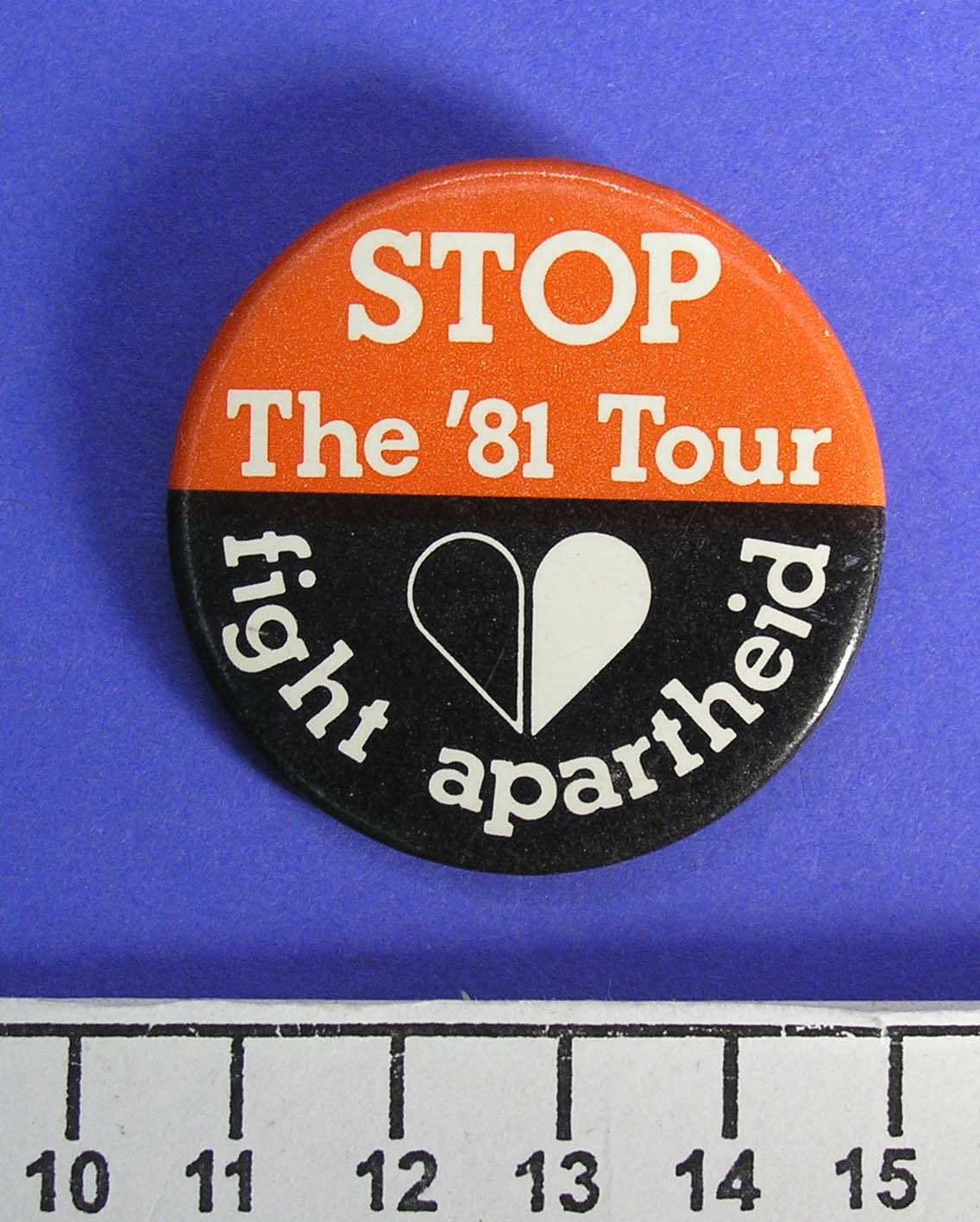
HART button badge reading, 'Stop The '81 Tour', above HART symbol and 'fight apartheid'

Until 1970, South Africa refused to allow mixed-race sports teams to tour South Africa, and they were not happy about having to play against "natives" in New Zealand. A protest movement against the 1960 New Zealand rugby union tour of South Africa used the slogan "No Maoris, No Tour", but it failed to stop the tour. In 1967, the New Zealand Rugby Union decided to cancel the proposed 1967 tour over the issue.

Trevor Richards, Tom Newnham, John Minto, Dave Wickham and others formed HART in 1969 to protest against the proposed 1970 New Zealand tour of South Africa. The tour went ahead after the South Africans agreed to accept a mixed-race team.

In 1973, HART promised a campaign of civil disruption if the Springboks, the South Africa national team, toured New Zealand. The Labour Prime Minister, Norman Kirk, prohibited the tour.

The All Blacks, the New Zealand national team, were next due to tour South Africa in 1976. Newly elected National Prime Minister Rob Muldoon refused to cancel the tour, which went ahead. Subsequently Commonwealth leaders adopted the Gleneagles Agreement whereby they agreed to discourage sporting contact with South Africa. Twenty-one African nations boycotted the 1976 Summer Olympics in Montreal in protest against the All Black tour.

HART merged with the National Anti-Apartheid Council in 1980 to become HART: NZAAM (Halt All Racist Tours: New Zealand Anti-Apartheid Movement). After ten years as National Chairperson, Richards stepped down and fellow HART founder Minto became president.

The high point of protest was around the 1981 Springbok tour of New Zealand in which thousands of New Zealanders protested to stretch police resources. HART was not the leading body in these protests, as broader organisations were set up in each major centre to coordinate protests, but HART members played a leading role in these organisations.

In 1985, a planned All Black tour of South Africa was stopped by the New Zealand High Court after two lawyers sued the NZRFU, claiming such a tour would breach the NZRFU's constitution. An unofficial tour did take place in 1986 by a team including the majority of the All Blacks players selected for the previous year's cancelled tour. These were known as the New Zealand Cavaliers, but were often advertised inside South Africa as the All Blacks or alternatively depicted with the Silver Fern. HART organised nationwide protests, but they were much smaller than the 1981 protests.

HART's reason for existence ended when South Africa rescinded the Population Registration Act, 1950 in 1991, leading to the further dismantling of apartheid by 1993.

== See also ==
- CARE (New Zealand)
- New Zealand cricket team in Zimbabwe in 2005
- Rugby union and apartheid
