= John Minto =

New Zealand political activist (born c. 1953)

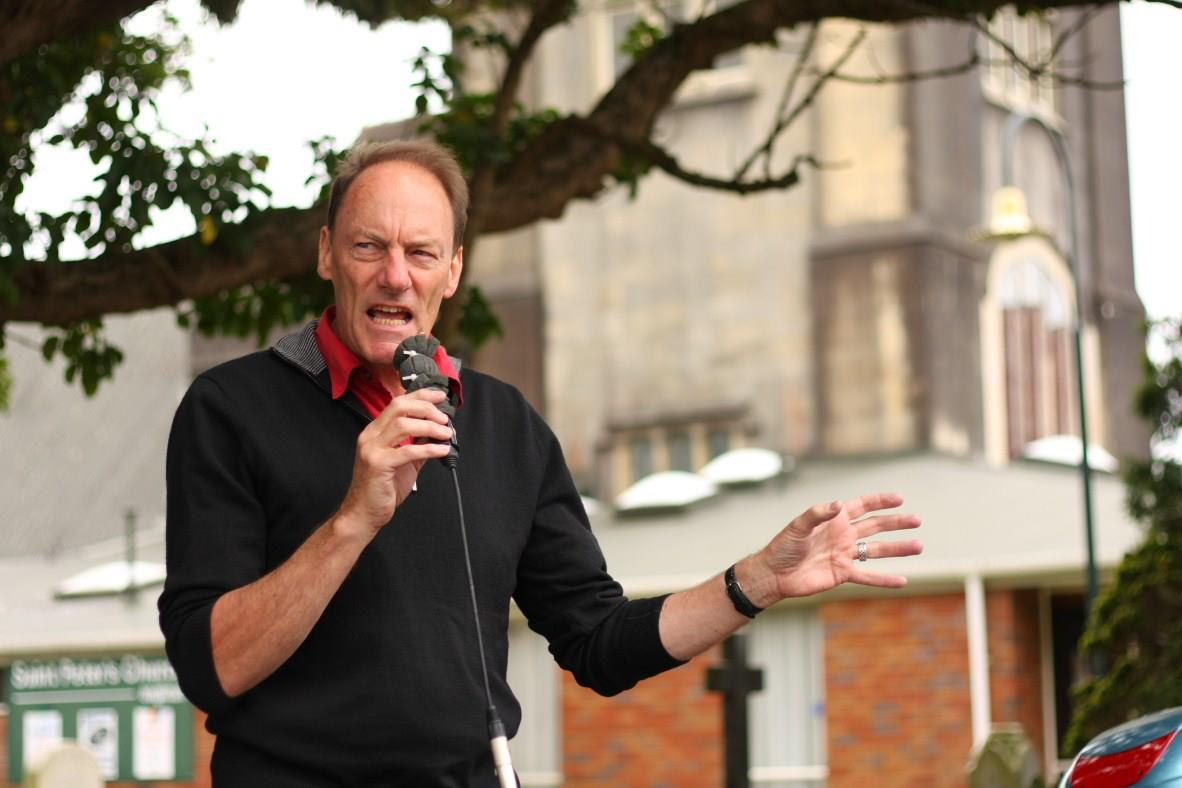
Minto at a 2012 Auckland Action Against Poverty beneficiary impact

John Minto (born c. 1953) is a New Zealand political activist known for his involvement in various left-wing groups and causes, most notably Halt All Racist Tours. A 2005 documentary on New Zealand's Top 100 History Makers listed him as number 89. As of 2011, he is involved with the protest group Global Peace and Justice Auckland and the Unite Union. He also wrote a weekly column for The Press and was formerly editor of the (now defunct) Workers' Charter newspaper.

Minto is a long-time member of the Post Primary Teachers' Association (PPTA) and also a national vice chairperson of QPEC, Quality Public Education Coalition (Inc) and co-vice-president of the Mana Movement. Minto was also a teacher at Hornby High School and retired from teaching in 2018.

== Activist career ==
=== Halt All Racist Tours ===
Trevor Richards, Tom Newnham and others formed Halt All Racist Tours to protest against rugby union tours to and from Apartheid South Africa, in 1969. Minto became the National Chairman of the organisation in 1980. In 1981, Minto was actively involved in protests against the South Africa national rugby union team's tour of New Zealand. He was assaulted by rugby supporters the evening after a disruptive protest at Rugby Park in Hamilton. This prompted him to add a protective helmet to his distinctive outfit of overalls. He remained at the forefront of the protests.

The New Zealand Security Intelligence Service (SIS) listed Minto in 1981 on a list of 'subversives' for the events of that year. In 2005 a police baton owned by Ross Meurant, a former member of Parliament who was second in charge of the "Red Squad" during the 1981 Springbok Tour was put up for auction online labelled as a "Minto Bar", a "joke" based on the co-incidence of names between John Minto and Minties, the brand name of a popular mint-flavoured sweet. In 2009 John Minto's helmet appeared in an episode of Tales from Te Papa a television series of mini-documentaries about objects from the collection of the Museum of New Zealand Te Papa Tongarewa.

In 2021, Minto organised a series of events around New Zealand, including in New Plymouth, Dunedin, and Invercargill, to mark the 40th anniversary of the protests against the 1981 Springbok Tour.

=== Companion of OR Tambo Award ===
During January 2008 Minto publicly "rejected" a nomination for the South African Companion of OR Tambo Award, saying he was dismayed over current conditions in the country. However, the Presidency of South Africa later stated that Minto had not been nominated for any national award.

=== Palestinian solidarity activism ===
==== 2009 Shahar Pe'er protest ====
In January 2009 Minto led a protest to the Auckland Tennis Stadium, where they demanded that Israeli player Shahar Pe'er, who served a compulsory two-years service in the Israel Defense Forces, withdraw from the tournament and denounce the Israeli Government and its actions in the 2008–2009 Israel-Gaza conflict, adding that she should respect international calls for a boycott against Israel. Pe'er ignored the group's demands and participated in the tournament as planned, stating at a press conference that "I think [the politics] is nothing to do with what I am doing".

Maurice Williamson, a member of parliament, rebuffed the protesters at the event, stating that Pe'er was not representing Israel and was playing as a private individual, and that thus the protesters should "leave her alone".

A similar protest occurred at the January 2010 event, where Shahar Pe'er again competed. On the third day of protest (7 January 2010) John Minto was one of five protesters arrested outside the ASB Tennis Centre in Auckland on a charge of disorderly behaviour. He later received of a 500-metre trespass-order. Minto subsequently successfully appealed his conviction on the charge of disorderly behaviour.

==== PSNA leadership ====
By 2021, Minto had become the Chair of the Palestine Solidarity Network Aotearoa (PSNA), which staged protests in response to the 2021 Israel–Palestine crisis and has called for the closure of the Israeli Embassy in Wellington. Minto has also expressed support for the Boycott, Divestment and Sanctions (BDS) movement, alleging that Israel is an "Apartheid state.

As Chair of the PSNA, Minto opposed the New Zealand Government's decision to join the International Holocaust Remembrance Alliance (IHRA) as an observer on 24 June 2022. He claimed that IHRA was a partisan organisation seeking to deflect criticism of Israeli policies and actions towards the Palestinians with what he regarded as "false smears" of antisemitism.

==== Gaza war, 2023–present ====
Following the outbreak of the Gaza war on 7 October 2023, Minto criticised the Auckland War Memorial Museum's decision to light up its premises in the colours of the Israeli flag in solidarity with Israel and victims of the 2023 Hamas-led attack on Israel. He condemned Hamas's attack and the kidnapping of civilians but said that Palestinians in New Zealand were enraged by the Government's refusal to condemn Israeli attacks on Palestinian civilians in the Gaza Strip. In early May 2024, Minto took part in a flash mob protest outside Foreign Minister Winston Peters' residence demanding that New Zealand reinstate funding for UNRWA and sever diplomatic relations with Israel.

In mid-October 2024, Minto, along with University of Canterbury postcolonial studies lecturer Josephine Varghese, successfully petitioned the Christchurch City Council to amend its procurement policy to exclude companies involved in building and maintaining Israeli settlements in the Occupied Palestinian territories. The Council voted by a margin of ten in favour, two opposed and three abstentions.

In late January 2025, Minto attracted media attention and controversy after establishing a hotline for New Zealanders to report Israeli citizens of military age who were holidaying in New Zealand in response to the Israel–Hamas war. New Zealand Jewish Council spokesperson Juliet Moses described the hotline as an "incitement to violence" and "vigilante justice" while Holocaust Centre New Zealand spokesperson Deb Hart said it would endanger the New Zealand Jewish community. Chief Human Rights Commissioner Stephen Rainbow described the hotline as "potentially harmful" to Israeli and Jewish people in New Zealand while Race Relations Commissioner Melissa Derby called on New Zealanders to support social cohesion. The Human Rights Commission called for the immediate halt of a local 'hotline' to report Israeli soldiers holidaying in New Zealand.The commission has received at least 100 complaints about the digital flyer being distributed by Palestine Solidarity Network Aotearoa. Similar criticism was echoed by Foreign Minister Winston Peters and ACT MP Simon Court, who said the hotline would promote totalitarianism and intimidatory behaviour against Israelis and Jews. His perceived anti-Semitism was also condemned by a group of 72 Church ministers from a variety of Church denominations . In response to criticism, Minto denied that the hotline campaign was anti-semitic but said that it was meant to "send the message to Israeli soldiers that New Zealand society does not support their actions." By 29 January, the Human Rights Commission had received about 100 complaints about a PSNA digital flyer promoting the hotline campaign.

In mid-May 2025, the Independent Police Conduct Authority (IPCA) found that the New Zealand Police had unlawfully pepper-sprayed and arrested Minto during a pro-Palestinian protest in Lyttelton on Waitangi Day in February 2024. Minto had been charged with obstructing and resisting Police during the protest. A Police investigation had initially ruled that Police actions were lawful but conceded that the arresting officer had failed in his duty "to provide aftercare" after pepper-spraying Minto. The IPCA's chair Judge Kenneth Johnston KC found there were several inconsistencies between the arresting officer's account and video footage of the incident. Johnston also concluded there was little evidence to support Police charges that Minto had obstructed and resisted Police during the protest. In mid June 2026, the Police awarded Minto $10,000 in compensation for the 2024 unlawful arrest and pepper spraying incident.

On 3 July, Minto and fellow PSNA co-chair Maher Nazzal referred six New Zealand political and business figures to the Prosecutor of the International Criminal Court, alleging their complicity in Israel's alleged war crimes during the Gaza war. These six individuals were Prime Minister Christopher Luxon, Foreign Affairs Minister Winston Peters, Defence and Space Minister Judith Collins, Deputy Prime Minister David Seymour, Rocket Lab chief executive Sir Peter Beck and Rakon Limited chief executive Dr Sinan Altug. The PSNA alleged that Rocket Lab launched spy satellites from Māhia that were used by Israel to target Palestinians while Rakon exported military-grade crystal oscillators to American defense contractors who supplied missiles to Israel for use in Gaza.

== Political career ==
=== Mayoralty bids ===
In April 2013, Minto announced his intention to run for the mayoralty of Auckland on the Mana Movement ticket. Minto had several candidates that ran for Councillor on the Minto for Mayor ticket. The campaign was unsuccessful with Minto coming fifth of 17 candidates.

In July 2016, Minto announced he would run in the 2016 Christchurch mayoral election as a candidate for The Keep Our Assets group. The campaign was unsuccessful as per 2016 Christchurch mayoral election.

=== Internet MANA ===
Minto stood in the 2014 New Zealand general election as a candidate for the Internet MANA party, and was ranked fourth on the party list. Mana Movement failed to win a single seat in Parliament.

=== Free Palestine ===
During the 2026 New Zealand general election, Minto stood as a candidate for the Free Palestine Party, and was ranked first on their party list. Based on preliminary results released on 8 November, the Free Palestine Party received 1,168 party votes (0.04%), below the five percent threshold needed to enter Parliament.

== Views and positions ==
=== COVID-19 pandemic ===
During the COVID-19 pandemic in New Zealand, John Minto expressed support for receiving COVID-19 vaccines but disagreed with the Government's vaccine mandate. Minto argued that vaccine mandates were an overreach of state power since they gave the Government the right to dismiss education and medical personnel for refusing to get vaccinated.

== Personal life ==
Since 2014, Minto has lived in the Christchurch suburb of Waltham. The sculptor Llew Summers was his brother-in-law.

== See also ==
- Halt All Racist Tours
- 1981 Springbok Tour
