= Finnigan v New Zealand Rugby Football Union =

- Court: Court of Appeal of New Zealand
- Full case name: Finnigan and another v. New Zealand Rugby Football Union (Incorporated) and others
- Decided: 21 June 1985
- Citation: [1985] 2 NZLR 159
- Transcript: High Court judgment Court of Appeal judgment

Court membership
- Judges sitting: Cooke, Richardson, McMullin, Somers JJ, and Sir Thaddeus McCarthy

Keywords
- standing, judicial review, All Blacks, South Africa

Finnigan v New Zealand Rugby Football Union, was a case taken against the New Zealand Rugby Football Union (NZRFU), by two members of NZRFU-affiliated clubs, challenging the decision of the NZRFU Council to accept an invitation for the All Blacks to tour South Africa. The invitation came just four years after the 1981 South Africa rugby union tour of New Zealand had divided the New Zealand public over the All Blacks refusal to participate in the sporting boycott of South Africa during the Apartheid era. The decision primarily concerned whether the two plaintiffs had sufficient standing to challenge the NZRFU decision. The decision marked the adoption of the principles of R (National Federation of Self-Employed and Small Businesses Ltd) v Inland Revenue Commissioners approach to standing in judicial review into New Zealand law.

== Background ==
The two plaintiffs, Patrick Thomas Finnigan and Philip James Recordon, were respectively members of Auckland University RFC and Teachers' RFC, both affiliated to the Auckland Rugby Union, itself a member of the NZRFU. On 20 May 1985 the plaintiffs sought to overturn a decision by the NZRFU Council to accept an invitation for the All Blacks to tour South Africa. As Cooke J noted,

They claimed that the decision failed to comply with the object of promoting, fostering and developing amateur rugby union football throughout New Zealand, and that for various specified reasons it gives the game a tarnished and sullied image and will reflect adversely on the game. These contentions we will refer to as the against-the-objects ground. They also claimed that the decision was outside the powers of the Council and could only have been made by the Union in general meeting. This we will refer to as the wrong body ground. They claimed therefore that the decision was invalid and unlawful, and sought a declaration and injunction.

The NZRFU as defendants sought to strike out the statement of claim as, "disclosing no cause of action and as frivolous, vexatious and an abuse of process." On 6 June the defendants strike out application was heard in the High Court by Sir Ronald Davison, the Chief Justice, who struck out the claim and dismissed the action, declining to grant the plaintiffs standing. The plaintiffs appealed.

== Judgment ==
The plaintiffs succeeded in their appeal, clearing the way for the claim to proceed to a substantive hearing. Cooke J delivered the judgment of the Court of Appeal. The judgment considered two points of law.

The first point concerned whether the NZRFU Council was the wrong body to make the arrangement of matches and tour. The Court agreed with the Chief Justice that the Council was not the wrong body to accept the invitation and held that the appeal failed on this point.

The second point concerned whether the plaintiffs had the requisite standing to bring their action against the NZRFU. The Court rejected the plaintiffs argument that implied contracts linked each of them with the NZRFU. However it approved earlier judgments that standing could be granted to those claiming an incorporated association acted beyond its powers even where no contract existed. Here Cooke J said,

In cases where an incorporated association is alleged to have acted against its objects but the plaintiff cannot show a contract, we think that all the circumstances have to be considered - case by case or category of case by category of case - in order to determine as a question of mixed law and fact whether or not he or she has sufficient standing.

The Court noted that the plaintiffs were connected to the club by a "chain of contracts" and that the plaintiffs were "at grass roots level; but it is the players, who are all at that level, for whom basically the organisation exists". The Court also noted that in exercising its discretion to grant standing regard had to be had to the plaintiff's claims that the NZRFU was acting contrary to the fundamental goals of its constitution and that "the decision challenged is probably at least as important as - if not more important than - any other in the history of the game in New Zealand." As Cooke J noted,

The decision affects the New Zealand community as a whole and so relations between the community and those, like the plaintiffs, specifically and legally associated with the sport. Indeed judicial notice can be taken of the obvious fact that in the view of a significant number of people, but no doubt contrary to the view of another significant number, the decision affects the international relations or standing of New Zealand.

The Court also noted that although the NZRFU was a private, voluntary association, its decision in this case put it in a "position of major national importance"; that the plaintiffs could not be dismissed as "mere busybodies, cranks or other mischief makers"; that unless persons such as the plaintiffs were granted standing they would have no "effective way of establishing whether or not the Union is acting within its lawful powers"; and that,

As a result of the disturbances accompanying the 1981 South African tour of New Zealand many citizens, including normally law-abiding citizens, were alleged to have gone too far when indulging in protest activity. The importance of preserving law and order was rightly stressed. The Courts applied the law impartially. There were numerous prosecutions, many of them successful. It is now no less appropriate that the lawfulness of the Union's decision under its own constitution to arrange the proposed tour should be open to test in the Courts.

== Significance ==
With standing granted, the hearing of the substantive action began in the Wellington High Court on 8 July, with the All Blacks due to leave for South Africa on 17 July. On 11 July the plaintiffs applied for an interim injunction to prevent the team leaving as it became clear the hearing would not be finished before the All Blacks were due to depart. Casey J ruled that,

[T]he plaintiffs in my opinion have put forward a strong prima facie case at this point for their proposition that the present tour cannot benefit rugby in this country. The correspondence and other evidence demonstrates much the same split in the community [as in 1981] over the issue, and those opposed cannot be brushed aside as irresponsible trouble makers or publicity seekers, as some of the evidence and opinions from the Union suggests. It is impossible to regard the leaders of nearly all our major churches, or a unanimous House of Representatives or the Auckland and North Harbour Rugby Unions in this light. Nor is the case answered by counting the heads of those who support the tour and suggesting they may be in a majority.

With the injunction granted the All Blacks tour of South Africa was halted. However an unofficial New Zealand team dubbed the New Zealand Cavaliers did tour South Africa in 1986.

== See also ==
- 1981 South Africa rugby union tour of New Zealand
- Sporting boycott of South Africa during the apartheid era
- South Africa under apartheid
