= South African Rugby Union (SACOS) =

The South African Rugby Union (founded 1966) was a non-racial governing body for rugby union in South Africa that aligned itself with the anti-apartheid movement. Previously known as the South African Coloured Rugby Football Board, SARU was a founder member of the South African Council on Sport and so strongly opposed the inter-racial structures of the South African Rugby Board (SARB). After the end of apartheid SARU combined with SARB in 1992 to form the South African Rugby Football Union, now known as the South African Rugby Union.

SARU's predecessor was the South African Coloured Rugby Football Board, founded in 1897 during South Africa's British colonial period as a national rugby governing body for players of colour. The SACRFB emerged from a meeting of all clubs and unions called to Kimberley by the Griqualand West Colonial Rugby Football Union. Black administrators like Bud Mbelle had earlier persuaded Cecil John Rhodes to provide a trophy like the Currie Cup to "'all the coloured Sporting People if South Africa'". The SACRFB then organized a domestic rugby competition for the Rhodes Cup, which started in 1898 and was first won by Western Province.

After the South African Rugby Football Federation broke away from the Coloured Rugby Football Board to ally themselves with the white South African Rugby Board in 1966, the remaining members changed the name to the South African Rugby Union (not to be confused with the current body of that name). In 1973 SARU became a founding member of the anti-apartheid South African Council on Sports, whose slogan argued that there could be no normal sport in an abnormal society.

SARU's predominantly coloured composition changed when they were joined by the mostly black Kwazakhele Rugby Union (Kwaru), itself a breakaway from the Port Elizabeth African Rugby Board. Kweru had initially wanted to affiliate with the black South African African Rugby Board but were rebuffed. Other black sporting bodies then followed Kwaru's lead.

== See also ==
- South African African Rugby Board
- South African Rugby Football Federation
- South African Rugby Union
