= South African Barbarians =

- Nickname: Baa-Baas
- Founded: 1960; 65 years ago
- Coach: (South Africa) Nick Mallett (May 2013)
Team kit

First match
- Natal – SA Barbarians (1960)

South African Barbarians is an invitational rugby union club styled along the lines of Barbarian F.C. It was formed in 1960 by Frank Mellish, the former 1951–52 Springbok selector and manager, together with former Natal Rugby Union President, Harry Stacey. The club is directly affiliated to the South African Rugby Union.

== Club colours and emblem ==
The club's colours are a light and dark blue quartered jersey with white shorts. Players may wear socks of their choice (usually preferring their own club socks). The blazer badge is similar to that used by the Barbarians in 1929, although playing jerseys simply have a leaping lamb on the left chest.

== History ==
=== Origins ===
The club's first incarnation was as a combined All Blacks and Springboks team under the captaincy of Avril Malan, in a fixture played against Natal RFC during the All Blacks' tour of South Africa in 1960. Another "red letter" day in the club's history was when it defeated the touring British Barbarians at Port Elizabeth in 1969. The club's existence was precarious thereafter but merged with the Quaggas, a Transvaal Barbarians side, in 1976 and recorded a narrow defeat (31–32) against the touring All Blacks' side of that year.

In May–June 1979, the SA Barbarians played against the Middlesex RFC County Centenary touring team, captained by 1974 B&I Lion Chris Rawlston, with a 28–28 draw being recorded.

=== 1979 Tour to the United Kingdom ===
Later that year, possibly the most significant event for the club was being the first multiracial South African rugby team to tour outside South Africa when it went to the United Kingdom in October 1979. The tour squad had eight white players (SARB), eight coloured players (SARFF) and eight black players (SARA/SARU) and was managed by Chick Henderson, formerly of Oxford University RFC, Richmond RFC, Coventry RFC and Transvaal RFC and who had gained nine caps for Scotland. Attempts were made from the start to integrate the squad's three ethnic groups, with six of the eight white Barbarians rooming with black or coloured teammates on the first overnight stay. The squad was coached in English despite only two of the twenty four using English as their first language whilst tour singing was often in Xhosa.

Seven fixtures were played, an eighth scheduled fixture against Maesteg on 20 October 1979 being cancelled, the results were as follows:

Date	Home team	Score	Away team	Venue
3 October 1979	Devon	18–27	SA Barbarians	Exeter
6 October 1979	Cornwall	7–23	SA Barbarians	Camborne
10 October 1979	Scottish Borders	20–20	SA Barbarians	Galashiels
14 October 1979	Co-Optimists	24–4	SA Barbarians	Hawick
17 October 1979	Coventry	24–41	SA Barbarians	Coventry
24 October 1979	Llanelli	6–15	SA Barbarians	Llanelli
27 October 1979	Newport	21–15	SA Barbarians	Newport

The Scottish leg of the tour saw two very demanding fixtures against "representative XVs", the first a highly creditable draw against a Borders Select which contained ten full Scottish capped players. The Sunday fixture against a strong Co-Optimist outfit containing five internationals was notable for the absence of a sizeable number of the white players from the starting line up on grounds of religious observance, principally amongst the forwards (only two white players started, with a further two joining as replacements, whilst previous starting line ups had included at least half a dozen of the white playing contingent).

It was tour policy to ensure that all players, injuries permitting, were selected to play a game in each of the three countries visited.

Seven of the touring side went on to gain full Springbok status: Martiens Le Roux, Ewoud Malan, Rob Louw and Divan Serfontein all featured against Bill Beaumont's 1980 Lions. Errol Tobias was later capped against Ireland in 1981 whilst Hennie Bekker and Div Visser gained their first caps on the "Barbed Wire Tour" to New Zealand later on in that year.

Seventeen of the twenty-four 1979 UK tourists represented various invitational or provincial sides against the touring Lions during 1980. Two significant fixtures specifically involving the SA Baa Baas took place during this tour. The first saw King's Park, Durban hosting the British and Irish Lions versus SA Baa Baas with five of the 1979 tour party included together with Hugo Porta and one time Australian back rower, Mark Loane. The second fixture of note involving the SA Baa Baas was the curtain raiser ahead of the Fourth Test Match at Loftus Versfeld. The Baa Baas included eight of the touring Lions party, alongside Porta and Jean-Pierre Rives in their match against a Junior Springbok side that contained two coloured players, Errol Tobias and Charles Williams (both 1979 UK tourists), the first two non-white players ever to represent what effectively was the Springboks second XV.

=== 1984 Tour to West Germany ===
Five years later on and the SA Barbarians undertook their second overseas tour, this time to West Germany. The touring party of twenty five was composed of twelve white and thirteen coloured and black players. Four fixtures were played (in Bonn, Wiedenbruck, Hannover and Heidelberg) 314 points were scored and only 27 conceded. South African "sides" had toured Southern Germany in 1974 and 1977 but this was the first multiracial tour to the Federal Republic which received official support and was seen as a reciprocal visit to the unofficial West German tour to South Africa in 1983 (under the guise of a Bonner XV)

=== Later amateur era ===
When the All Blacks' proposed tour to South Africa in 1985 was cancelled, a Springbok Internal Tour was arranged, the highlight of which was when the shadow Springbok team defeated the SA Baa Baas. One year on, the club also faced the touring New Zealand Cavaliers.

During the 1987 rebel South Sea Barbarians' 13 match tour (a team made up of representatives from Fiji, Samoa, Tonga and one Canadian(!)), organised in lieu of the cancelled visit by Australia, the SA Barbarians played two matches. No official test matches took place between the teams, however, in contrast to the 1985 and 1986 sides, the 1987 SA Barbarians lineup had a far more distinct Springbok XV feel to it despite some senior players questioning the quality of the opposition. The South Sea tourists were defeated 56–30 at Ellis Park but pushed their hosts considerably closer at Kings Park one week later in a narrower 38–32 loss. Earlier in March of the same year, a fixture to commemorate the centenary of the Crusaders club of Port Elizabeth had seen the Barbarians record a 16–10 victory.

In 1988 a multiracial side (the SA Barbarians in all but name - they toured as the Nampak Pioneers) eventually undertook a six match visit to Chile and Paraguay after a series of postponements and reschedulings. Home sides were intended to be bolstered by considerable Argentinian and Uruguayan representation - which did not come to pass and consequently a series of one sided encounters took place with over 100 points being scored against the respective national sides.

=== The professional era ===
As with other Barbarian clubs internationally the club has struggled to get fixtures in the professional era although it hosted a touring Welsh XV in June 1993 when (despite the inclusion of nine Springboks and three Namibian internationals) Wales ran out comfortable winners, 56–17. The SA Barbarians subsequently toured to the UK later on in the same year playing 8 games against club & county sides & remained undefeated . Many of the touring side , managed by the club secretary Perry Davies attained full South African colours .

== Notable players ==
Many well-known international players from other countries have represented the club including Hugo Porta, Jean-Pierre Rives, Tom Grace and Fergus Slattery. The 1992 SA Barbarian side that played against Transvaal featured Philippe Sella, Philippe Saint-André, Peter Winterbottom and Viliami Ofahengaue.

== 2013 squad ==
The following players were named in the team to play the Lions in the 2013 Lions Challenge Series:

Head Coach: (South Africa) Pine Pienaar

Player	Position	Club	Union
Shaun Malton	Hooker	(England) Nottingham	South Africa
Os Hamman	Prop	(South Africa) Maties	South Africa
JC Janse van Rensburg	Prop	(South Africa) Lions	South Africa
Bees Roux	Prop	(Italy) Treviso	South Africa
Jared Saunders	Prop	(England) Saracens	England
De-Jay Terblanche	Prop	(South Africa) Pumas	South Africa
Edwin Hewitt	Lock	(South Africa) Griquas	South Africa
Eoin Sheriff	Lock	(England) Saracens	Ireland
Myles Tucker	Lock	(South Africa) Maties	South Africa
Jonathan Adendorf	Flanker	(South Africa) Griquas	South Africa
Derick Minnie	Flanker	(South Africa) Lions	South Africa
Marnus Schoeman	Flanker	(South Africa) Griquas	South Africa
Corné Steenkamp	Flanker	(South Africa) Pumas	South Africa
Davon Raubenheimer	No 8	(South Africa) Free State Cheetahs	South Africa
Lohan Jacobs	Scrum-half	(South Africa) Blue Bulls	South Africa
Darryl Veenendaal	Scrum-half	(England) Bedford	South Africa
Francois Brummer	Fly-half	(South Africa) Griquas	South Africa
Jacques-Louis Potgieter	Fly-half	(France) Dax	South Africa
Paul Bosch	Centre	(France) Montpellier	Germany
Luzuko Vulindlu	Centre	(South Africa) Griquas	South Africa
Hansie Graaff	Winger	(South Africa) Griffons	South Africa
Courtnall Skosan	Winger	(South Africa) Blue Bulls	South Africa
Vainon Willis	Winger	(South Africa) Blue Bulls	South Africa
Clayton Blommetjies	Full-back	(South Africa) Blue Bulls	South Africa

== Results ==
16 May 2013
18:15 BST (UTC+01)

Saracens (England)	19–0	(South Africa) South African Barbarians
Try: Short 26' c Wilson 31' m, 53' c Con: Spencer 27', 55' (2/3)

Artillery Ground, London
Referee: David Rose (England)

== See also ==
- Australian Barbarians
- Brussels Barbarians
- Fiji Barbarians
- French Barbarians
- New Zealand Barbarians
