= South African Rugby Union =

Sports governing body

- Sport: Rugby union
- Founded: 1992; 34 years ago
- World Rugby affiliation: 1992
- Rugby Africa affiliation: 1992
- Headquarters: Cape Town
- President: Mark Alexander
- CEO: Rian Oberholzer (Interim)
- Men's coach: Rassie Erasmus
- Women's coach: Louis Koen
- Sevens coach: Sandile Ngcobo
- Website: sarugby.co.za

The South African Rugby Union (SARU) is the governing body for rugby union in South Africa and is affiliated to World Rugby. It was established in 1992 as the South African Rugby Football Union, from the merger of the South African Rugby Board and the non-racial South African Rugby Union (SACOS), and took up its current name in 2005.

SARU organises several national teams, most notably the senior national side, the Springboks. SARU consists of 14 regional associations, each of which sends its own team to the Currie Cup, the oldest and most important league title in South Africa. In addition, the SuperSport Rugby Challenge takes place annually.

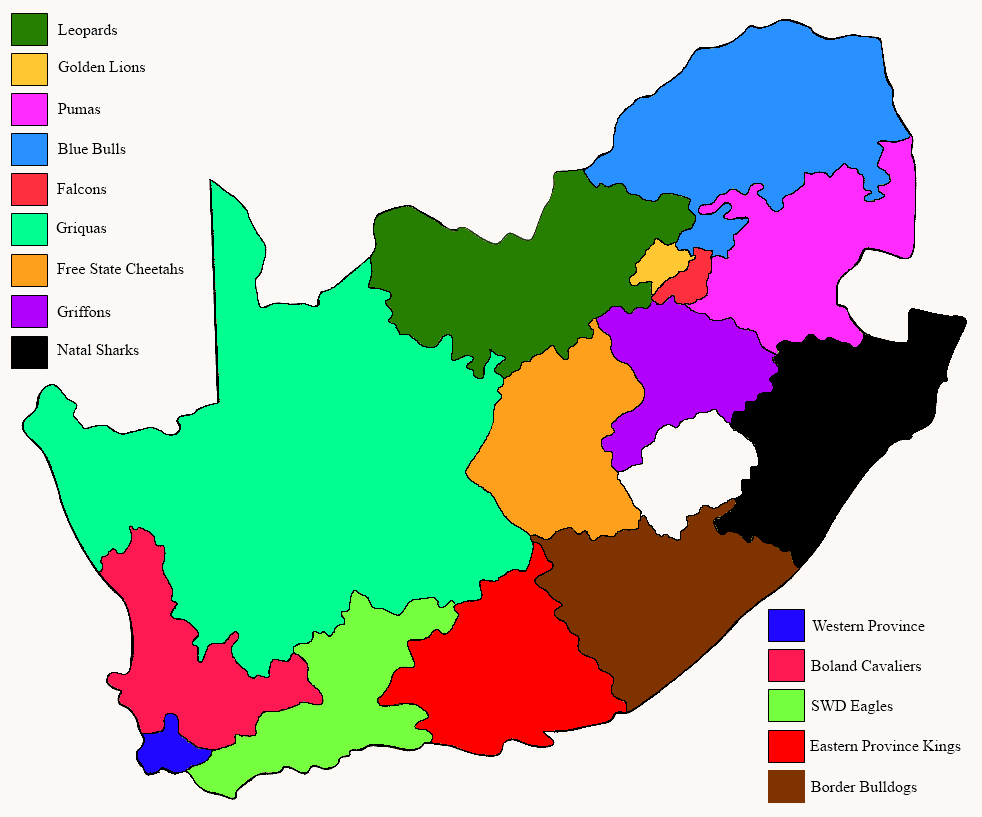
Map of the provincial rugby unions within South Africa

In addition to the actual national team, the SARU also puts together other teams. The Junior Springboks are the U-20 national team and take part in the Rugby Championship and the World Championships. There are also the Blitzboks, the national team for sevens rugby. Children and young people are introduced to rugby at school and then, depending on their interest and talent, training begins. The most talented players at school level are brought together every year after Craven Week (named after Danie Craven ) in the SA Schools team. Each South African university has its own rugby team, which can take part in the Varsity Cup and the Varsity Shield.

The national championship is superseded by the international championship United Rugby Championship, which is played together with teams from Ireland and Wales, as well as two franchises each from Italy and Scotland. South Africa is represented by four franchises, which are managed by the SARU: the Bulls from Pretoria, the Lions from Johannesburg, the Sharks from Durban and the Stormers from Cape Town. Since the seasons overlap only slightly, many players are used in both professional leagues.

== History ==
The South African Rugby Board was the rugby union governing body of white South Africans between 1889 and 1992. The governing of white and coloured rugby union was handled separately during South Africa under Apartheid. In 1992 the non-racial South African Rugby Union and the South African Rugby Board were merged to form the South African Rugby Football Union. The unified body changed its name in 2005 to the current South African Rugby Union.

=== Kamp Staaldraad ===
The debacle of the 2003 World Cup saw the Springboks exit in the quarterfinals. Further, SARU experienced the scandal of Kamp Staaldraad, the training camp run by then-Boks coach Rudolf Straeuli. Reportedly, "naked players were crammed into foxholes and doused repeatedly with ice-cold water while the English national anthem and New Zealand's haka were played over and over again... [and] were also forced into a freezing lake in the early hours of the morning to pump up rugby balls under water and... when some players tried to get out they were ordered back into the water at gunpoint." Straeuli resigned, as did Rian Oberholzer, the managing director of South Africa Rugby (Pty) Ltd, the commercial arm of SARFU. Soon afterwards, SARFU president Silas Nkununu, facing a strong reelection challenge, withdrew from consideration for election.

=== van Rooyen ===
Brian van Rooyen was elected president of SARU in 2004. He soon became a highly polarising figure in South African sport, with detractors accusing him of financial shenanigans, favouritism, and general mismanagement. His management style was also widely perceived as autocratic. One of the major gripes against the Van Rooyen administration was the allocation of venues for the Springboks home test matches. The KwaZulu-Natal Union and the Free State Union did not receive a Tri Nations Test in 2005 or 2006. Both unions, vocal opponents of Van Rooyen, accused him of punishing them for their opposition.

=== SANZAR ===
However, the biggest bone of contention surrounded the expansion of the Super Rugby competition. SANZAR, a consortium of the South African, Australian, and New Zealand governing bodies, expanded their Super 12 competition to 14 teams, a change that took effect in 2006. South Africa was entitled to add one franchise to the four from the Super 12 era. In a controversial move, the Southern Spears franchise was assured a place in the 2007 and 2008 competitions, with an increasingly unpopular promotion/relegation system established to keep the total of South African Super 14 teams at its allotted five. Van Rooyen was widely viewed as being responsible for this arrangement, which was generally opposed by the existing Super 12/14 sides. The South African government attempted to step in to address perceived problems within Van Rooyen's administration, but he survived two years of attempts to oust him. Finally, at the February 2006 SARU General Meeting, Van Rooyen was voted out.

Oregan Hoskins, who promised a more decentralised management style, was voted in. After the election, it was alleged by Free State Rugby Union president Harold Verster that Van Rooyen had offered a bribe of ZAR 3 million (US$485,000) plus a Springboks test against France to the Free State union in exchange for the union changing its vote in the presidential election in his favour. Hoskins announced that a planned investigation into Van Rooyen's administration would go forward. In June 2006 Van Rooyen was banned from serving in any capacity on the general council or committees of the South African Rugby Union.

As for the Spears issue, the SARU Presidents' Council issued a recommendation on 24 March 2006 that SA Rugby revisit the decision to admit the Spears. On 19 April 2006, the decision to admit the Spears was officially overturned by SARU.

== See also ==
- South African Rugby Football Federation
- South Africa national rugby union team
- South Africa national rugby sevens team
- South Africa women's national rugby union team
- South Africa women's national rugby sevens team
- Currie Cup
