= South African Rugby Board =

The South African Rugby Board was the rugby union governing body of white South Africans between 1889 and 1992. The governing of white and coloured rugby union was handled separately during South Africa under Apartheid.

On 23 March 1992 the non-racial South African Rugby Union (SARU) and the South African Rugby Board (SARB) were merged to form the South African Rugby Football Union (SARFU). The unified body changed its name in 2005 to the current South African Rugby Union.

== Names ==
The Board had different names over the years. They are detailed below:

- 1889: South African Football Board (SAFB);
- 1894: South African Rugby Football Board (SARFB);
- 1978: South African Rugby Board (SARB) – Suid-Afrikaanse Rugbyraad (SARR), absorbing the South African Rugby Football Federation (SARFF) and the South African Rugby Association (SARA).

== See also ==
- South African Rugby Union
- Springboks
