= South African Rugby Football Federation =

The South African Rugby Football Federation was an association formed by the majority of "Coloured" rugby union clubs that broke away from the South African Coloured Rugby Football Board (SACRFB) in the 1960s to affiliate with the whites-only South African Rugby Board (SARB). The SACRFB was founded in 1896.

The split with the SACRFB was driven by a number of factors and people, including personality clashes between SACRFB rugby officials Cuthbert Loriston and Abdullah Abbass. Since the 1950s black, coloured and Indian sporting codes had come under increased pressure to pursue three divergent paths: form non-racial organisations, affiliate with white associations (where they would continue within their segregated leagues), or refuse to do either. From the 1960s the formation of organisations such as the South African Sports Association and the South African Non-Racial Olympic Committee pressed black sports groupings to move towards non-racial amalgamation. Danie Craven, then president of SARB, was one of the main driving forces behind the drive to affiliate coloured rugby under the SARB, believing that he could not desegregate rugby unilaterally while all other sporting codes followed the segregation policies set by the apartheid government.

Loriston became the first president of the newly constituted SARFF, while the remainder of the SACRFB's clubs formed the SACOS-affiliated South African Rugby Union under leadership of Abass. SARU promoted non-racial rugby instead of the racially segregated associations that existed under SARB's organisational umbrella. It should not be confused with the body founded in 1992 that presently governs rugby in South Africa.

== See also ==
- Proteas
- South African African Rugby Board
- South African Rugby Union
- South African Rugby Union (SACOS)
