= Carl Otto Hager =

German architect, portrait painter and photographer (1813–1898)

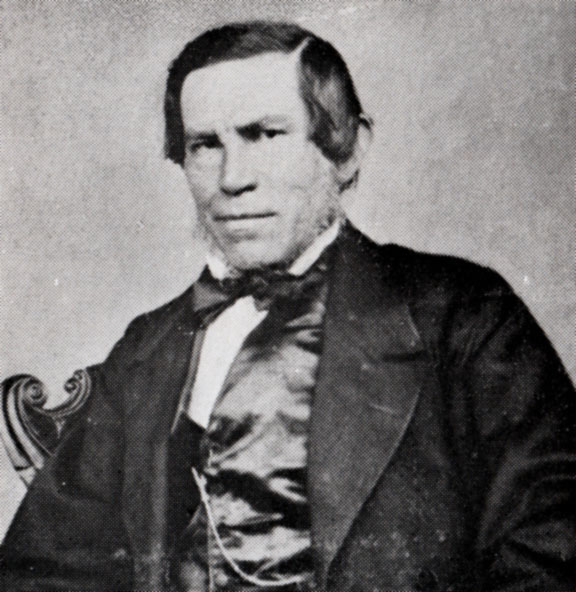
- Born: 16 October 1813; Dresden, Kingdom of Saxony
- Died: 7 October 1898; Stellenbosch, Cape Colony
- Occupations: Architect, portrait painter and pioneering photographer
- Spouse: Cornelia Janssen
- Children: 11 (or seven)
- Parent: Johann Gotthelf Hager en Johanna Rosina Galwitz

Carl Otto Hager (16 October 1813 – 7 October 1898) was a German architect, portrait painter and pioneering photographer who became especially known in South Africa for the design of numerous church buildings of the Dutch Reformed Church.

He was one of the greatest exponents of the Neo-Gothic architectural style in South Africa, but many of the churches he designed have since been demolished, including those at Carnarvon, Fraserburg, Willowmore (it is uncertain whether he actually designed them), Caledon, Ceres and Heidelberg, Cape. Some of the most beautiful that have survived are those at Stellenbosch, Piketberg, Ladismith, Somerset East and Pearston. He also designed churches in the Free State, but their names have been forgotten. Other notable buildings for which he was responsible are the Seminary (since radically altered) and the neoclassical Old Main Building of the university at Stellenbosch.

== Childhood and education ==
Hager was the son of Johann Carl Gotthelf Hager (Dresden, 1764 – 15 July 1816), legal consultant and tax official of the Saxon government, and his second wife, Johanna Rosina Galwitz (Russia, 1792 – Stellenbosch, 7 February 1854), a Russian lady of the nobility. Hager lost his father when he was three years old. Wilhelm Krüger (1775–1820), a well-known artist at the time, came to live with the family and the portraits he painted were copied so well by Hager that Kruger gave him lessons. He went to school at the age of six, but his drawing lessons continued until he was nine years old.

Due to his remarkable artistic talent, Hager was enrolled in 1828 at the Royal Academy of Arts in Dresden, where he studied until 1834 and qualified as a portrait painter. According to another source, Hager studied architecture at the Royal Academy of Arts in Dresden, not painting.

After his practical training, he emigrated to the Cape Colony in December 1838 with his student friend Carel Sparmann after a chance meeting with a former German consul at the Cape. Together they set up a construction firm in the Cape and in the meantime Hager also made a name for himself as a portrait painter and drawing teacher, although it was difficult for him to make a living due to a temporary business trip in Cape Town. In 1840 they were entrusted with the planning of St. Mary's Cathedral on Stalplein. Even today the ornate interior shows the unmistakable traces of Hager's designs. After the completion of the church building the two parted ways.

Hager moved to Stellenbosch in 1841, where he found work as a portrait painter. According to his memoirs, in a mixture of Dutch and German, this town reminded him of his "... fatherland and a sense of foreboding told me that it would be a place of rest on the earth for my being". From April 1842 he worked in Paarl and the surrounding area and from January 1843 in Worcester, Swellendam and Port Beaufort on the Breede River. On 9 August 1842 he married Cornelia Margaretha Janssen (died 22 April 1886) in Stellenbosch, the daughter of the local German teacher and herself a music teacher. For at least 20 years of their married life they had to live a struggling existence in which Hager was sometimes a portrait painter, then a snuff maker, then a candle maker and finally a photographer. He also loved to sketch and many of his sketches have fortunately survived.

== Church architect ==
Hager's design for the NG mother church in Stellenbosch made him almost immediately famous and orders for similar church buildings began to pour in from all over. He thus became the father of the Neo-Gothic architectural style in South Africa. Sometimes he personally supervised the construction work, for example during his stay in Somerset East for the construction of the local NG church when he stayed in the rectory with Rev. J.H. Hofmeyr and his family. In his Memoirs, Hager tells how he moved into Rev. Hofmeyr's rectory and how they accepted him as a member of their own family and he was able to share freely in domestic and religious life. He lived in the rectory for a total of 18 months and wrote: "It was a dear family. I was immediately accepted and shared in the domestic and religious fellowship… Through the example of Rev. Hofmeyr I made dear friends. I was honored and loved by everyone. If I had been at the height of misery for any number of years in Cape Town, then I was (in Somerset) at the height of prosperity, honor and blessings."

Hager sometimes assigned the supervision to his eldest son, Johann Carl Maxmillian Hager (1844–1917), but always drew the plans himself. Among the church buildings he designed were those of Clanwilliam (1864), Fraserburg (1866, since demolished), Somerset East (1870), Heidelberg, Cape (1872, since demolished), Ladismith (1874), Tulbagh (1876), Caledon (1877, since demolished), Oudtshoorn (1877–1880), Piketberg (1881). Churches that he does not mention in his memoirs, but which are most likely his work, are those of Ceres (1881, since demolished), Porterville (1894, since demolished), Hopefield (1877, later enlarged) and the Dutch Reformed congregation of Willowmore (since demolished).

In his memoirs he also mentioned several churches in the Orange Free State congregation between 1874 and 1880, but the names of the congregations are not known. Unfortunately, Hager does not mention these churches by name. Because church documents were largely destroyed during the Second War of Independence, there is no evidence as to which buildings are in question here. It is also known that he drew up the plans for the parsonage at Willowmore and was responsible for changes to the roof of the restored parsonage at Fraserburg. The only other buildings that can undoubtedly be attributed to him are the old Seminary at Stellenbosch, with the adjoining residences for professors (1868, thoroughly rebuilt in 1905) and the main building of the Victoria College, the cornerstone of which was laid in December 1880. The building was not taken into use until five years and 11 months later. It is the oldest academic building on the Stellenbosch University campus and was the result of an idea that arose in 1879 during the town's 200th anniversary celebration to build a memorial that would commemorate the town's founding, and therefore it was decided to erect a grand, new college building.

Richard Wocke (1831–1890), who, in addition to numerous government and other buildings, also designed the famous Two-Tower Church in Bloemfontein and the NG churches at Boshof, Brandfort, Edenburg, Philippolis and Rouxville, trained for several years in Cape Town as a plasterer and bricklayer under Hager. He therefore adopted Hager's direct, powerful style of church design.

The Neo-Gothic style of church building, of which Hager was the greatest exponent in South Africa, was the dominant style for Afrikaans church buildings until the early 20th century. After this, the architects Gerard Moerdijk and Wynand Louw made an effort to make it fall out of favor with the general Afrikaans public and especially with the church councils who decided in what form their church building would be erected. Schalk W. le Roux writes in his dissertation The search of three architects for a plan form for Afrikaans Reformed church building: "At the beginning of the twentieth century, with the rise of a distinctive consciousness after the Anglo-Boer War (1899–1902) and attempts at church unification before and after the establishment of the Union of South Africa (1910), an 'own' South African or Afrikaans church building style was eagerly sought. The search was led and directed by Wynand Louw and Gerard Moerdijk. This was accompanied by the rapid urbanization that continued until the 1940s. Many new congregations were founded, especially in cities, at a time when the contemporary functionalist aspiration in architecture was at the forefront. The first architects who were also members of the churches appeared on the scene and reflected on the nature and form that 'their' churches in the South African town or city should have. adopt." This search paved the way for the Neo-Byzantine church building style, which J.M.J. Koorts discusses in Principles of Reformed Church Building. He admits that these were the very first attempts at something new and typically South African, but believes that the churches are "imitations" of the Byzantine style that inspired them. It was somewhat modified with the help of more modern materials, building methods and a sense of scale. Koorts says that to further modernize these churches, "they were adorned with all the modernisms of the thirties: theatrical lines, vertical stripes, curls and other fancy things. The towers stood out in particular with stickers of modernist lines that strongly resemble jukeboxes found in cafes." He describes the building work as consisting mainly of "clumsy compositions of ornamental stone masses; the ornamental stones are mostly shiny, smooth and yellow-red".

Koorts describes the Neo-Gothic churches as the only type of church building to date (1974) that is "solemn and imposing in its appearance and which possesses a sacred atmosphere within". He describes the style as "old-fashioned" and a "simplified" Gothic with here and there Romanesque and Baroque elements. Koorts believes: "Purely architecturally, we can look back on these churches with pride; they belong to a venerable period that has passed unnoticed. It is only tragic that some of the most ornate ones have already landed in front of the bulldozer to make way for a new structure that does no honour to the landscape."

== Death and descendants ==
Hager was buried in the cemetery at Papegaaiberg. Of his eleven children, five died young, although another source puts the number at seven: Johan Carl Hager (1844–1917), Cornelia Susana Hager (1856–1924), Nicolaas Hager (1848–1848), Johanna Rosina Hager (1851–unknown), Carl Louis Hager (1852–1916), Emelia Charlotta Hager (1859–1860) and Carolina Ottoria Hager (1864–1936). The eldest son later became an architect-builder in the ZAR, where he designed numerous churches and public buildings, for example the tower church at Middelburg (1890). The youngest son, Carl Louis, became a teacher in the Orange Free State and was also a professional photographer.

Of the numerous oil portraits that Hager painted in the 1940s, a few are in the Stellenbosch Museum. His memoirs were translated into English by a descendant, Elizabeth J. Hager, under the title Autobiography of Carl Otto Hager, architect and artist ... (Johannesburg, 1960). In 1993, the Stellenbosch Museum published S.M. Hofmeyr's work Carl Otto Hager van Stellenbosch. In 2015, Ode Krige's Carl Otto Hager – architek tot eer van god, 1813–1898 was published by Hemel & See Boeke.
