= Dutch Reformed Church, Pearston =

Church in Pearston, South Africa

Coordinates: 32°34′51.78″S 25°08′22.71″E

Dutch Reformed Church
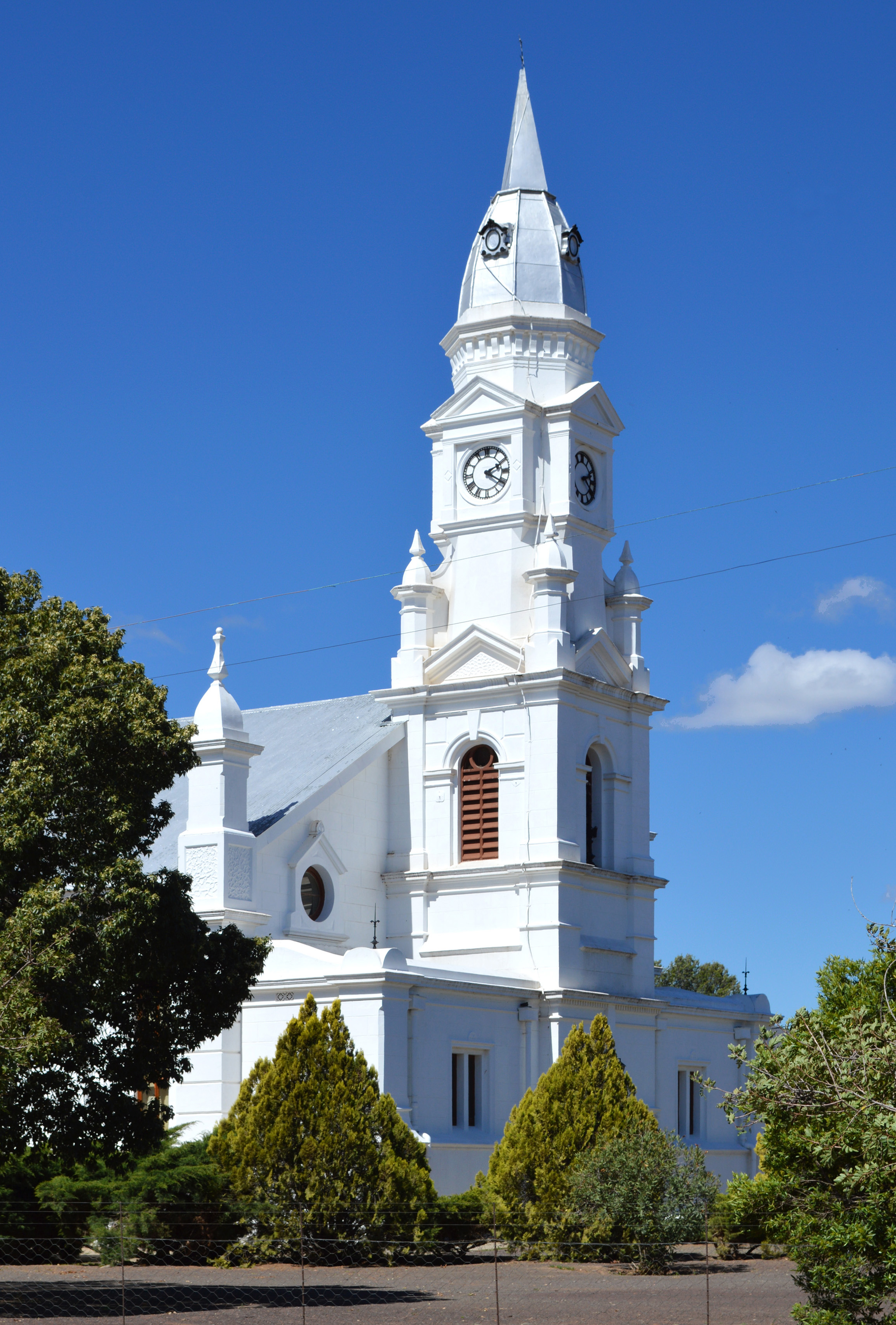
- Dutch Reformed Church
- Location: Pearston
- Country: South Africa
- Denomination: Nederduits Gereformeerde Kerk

History
- Founded: 1859

Architecture
- Functional status: Church

The Dutch Reformed Church in Pearston is a congregation of the Dutch Reformed Church in the Eastern Cape. At the time of its establishment, it was the 76th congregation in the Church and the 18th in what would later become the Eastern Cape Synod, but moved up one place in each case with the merger of the mother congregations of Middelburg and Middelburg-Uitsig in 2010. Because the village of Pearston was founded as a church town and the congregation is older than the settlement, Pearston owes its name to the congregation, and not the other way around as is usually the case.

== Foundation ==
The event that led to the establishment of the congregation was a meeting held on 21 September 1859 on the farm Rustenburg on the Vogel River in the Somerset East district, at which it was decided to apply to the Presbytery meeting to be held at Graaff-Reinet for the establishment of a separate congregation here. In order to obtain the required leave from the Presbytery, brothers J. Meintjes and C. Ziervogel were deputed to submit the request to the Presbytery meeting. This was granted on 12 October and the Presbytery Commission was instructed to take the necessary steps towards the establishment of the congregation. Immediately, work was also underway to build a parsonage and an emergency church.

The first church council members were, as elders, J. Meintjes and P.R. Botha and, as deacons, C.J. Lotter, G. van Eeden, J.J. Odendal and G.A.P. Kotzé. The first religious service was held here on 20 November of the same year by the consultant, Rev. John Pears of the Somerset-East Reformed Church, after whom the congregation was named. On this occasion the first church council members were introduced. At the first church council meeting on 16 January 1860 it was decided to begin building the parsonage and emergency church (temporary church), which cost about £2 000. After two calls were resigned, Rev. C.T. Muller of Jansenville accepted the third. He was confirmed on 7 September 1861, almost two years after the founding of the congregation. He served here for 12 years, when he again accepted a call to his old congregation.

In his time, namely in the year 1865, a start was made with the construction of a new church, but due to difficulties in the congregation (dispute between two strong parties), the work was stopped when the walls had already reached a certain height. This long-standing feud only subsided during the service of the fourth pastor. Rev. Muller's successor was the Rev. C.W. du Toit (9 May 1874 to June 1875). After a long period of service, Prop. P.F. Hugo was only ordained eight months after he accepted the profession on 29 September 1877 because he was traveling in Europe at the time of the profession. He served the congregation with faithfulness and dedication for only five years until 1883, because on 14 May of that year he was called to higher service. He left behind a considerable sum of money which he had collected with much effort for the building fund of the new church.

== Sources ==
- Maeder, ds. G.A. en Zinn, Christian. 1917. Ons Kerk Album.
- Olivier, ds. P.L. (samesteller), 1952. Ons gemeentelike feesalbum. Kaapstad en Pretoria: N.G. Kerk-uitgewers.
