= Bruintjieshoogte Pass =

Coordinates: 32°40′46.0″S 25°20′44.9″E

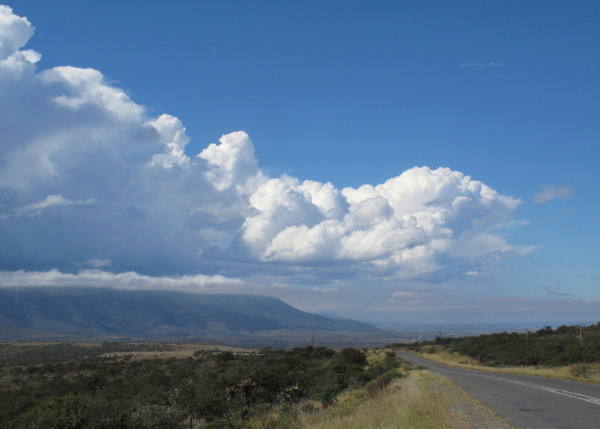
Bruintjieshoogte

Bruintjieshoogte Pass, (English: Brown's Height) is a mountain pass situated in the Eastern Cape province of South Africa, on the Regional road R63, between Somerset East and Pearston.

The Pass is named after Nicolaas de Bruijn, a former Heemraad of Swellendam.

The eponymous surrounding Bruintjieshoogte mountain range lies between the Sundays River, Renosterberg, the Groot Winterhoek Mountains, Camdeboo National Park, and the Sneeuberge and forms a watershed for the Little Fish River (a tributary of the Great Fish River) and the western side of the Blyde River (tributary of the Sundays River). The highest peak in the range is 1,757 m above sea level.

The first white settlers came to the area in the 1770s. In 1776, Swedish naturalist Anders Sparrman described the area as the most beautiful he had ever seen, and was shortly followed in September 1778 by the Governor of the Cape of Good Hope Joachim van Plettenberg. Although the Dutch East India Company declared the mountains the eastern border of Dutch Cape Colony in 1770, this did not stop settlers from farming the fertile Little Fish River valley. The history of the region was marked by struggles over boundaries, cattle theft, and resistance to government authority by Trekboers, Xhosa, Khoikhoi, San, and the British government. Shortly before 1780, adventurer Coenraad de Buys visited the area, as did Sir John Barrow, 1st Baronet, who was not fond of the Trekboers' behavior. The local inhabitants played roles in the Van Jaarsveld Rebellion of 1799 and the Slachter's Nek Rebellion of 1815, and the area was strategic during the Fourth Frontier War of 1810–11.

Since 1991, an annual marathon and tour has been held here.

== Sources ==
- Böeseken, A.J. (1966). Die Nuusbode. Cape Town: Nasou.
- Gie, S.F.N. (1955). Geskiedenis vir Suid-Afrika of Ons Verlede, vol. 2 (1795-1918). Cape Town: UUB.
- Pretorius, F. (ed.) (2012). Geskiedenis van Suid-Afrika: Van voortye tot vandag. Cape Town: Tafelberg. ISBN 978-0-624-05466-5
- Raper, P.E. (2004). New dictionary of South African place names. Johannesburg: Ball. ISBN 1-86842-190-2
