= Jean-Luc du Plessis =

South African rugby union player

- Born: 7 May 1994 (age 32) Cape Town, South Africa
- Height: 1.79 m (5 ft 10 1/2 in)
- Weight: 87 kg (13 st 10 lb; 192 lb)
- School: Paarl Boys' High School, Paarl
- University: Varsity College
- Notable relative(s): Carel du Plessis (father); Michael du Plessis (uncle); Willie du Plessis (uncle); Daniël du Plessis (cousin)

Rugby union career
- Position(s): Fly-half, Fullback
- Current team: Stormers / Western Province
Youth career
- 2007–2012: Western Province
- 2013–2014: Sharks
Senior career
Years	Team	Apps	(Points)
2014	Sharks XV	2	(13)
2015–2019	Western Province	15	(83)
2016–2020	Stormers	39	(232)
2021–2022	Mie Honda Heat	1	(0)
2022–	Stormers		
2023–	Western Province		
- Correct as of 24 November 2022
International career
Years	Team	Apps	(Points)
2014	South Africa Under-20	2	(2)
- Correct as of 18 April 2018

Jean-Luc du Plessis (born 7 May 1994 in Cape Town) is a South African rugby union player for the Stormers in the United Rugby Championship and for Western Province in the Currie Cup and the Rugby Challenge. His regular position is fly-half.

== Career ==
=== Youth ===
He represented Western Province at youth level, represented them at the 2007 Under-13 Craven Week competition and at the 2012 Under-18 Craven Week competition. However, at the end of 2012, despite being offered a spot in the Western Province Rugby Institute and receiving a contract with Western Province, he moved to Durban instead to join the Sharks Academy.

Du Plessis was the third-highest scorer in the 2013 Under-19 Provincial Championship Division A competition for the Sharks U19, scoring 116 points in eleven starts.

In April 2014, Du Plessis was named in the South Africa Under-20 squad for the 2014 IRB Junior World Championship.

=== Sharks ===
Du Plessis' first class debut came for the Sharks XV during the 2014 Vodacom Cup competition. He came on as a substitute in their 40–3 victory over Kenyan side Simba XV at City Park Stadium, Athlone. Within five minutes of coming on, Du Plessis scored a try and kicked the subsequent conversion. His first start came in the following match, a 27–11 defeat to the Eastern Province Kings in Durban, with Du Plessis scoring two penalties.

=== Western Province ===
He returned to Cape Town in 2015, joining Western Province for the 2015 Vodacom Cup competition.

== Personal ==
Du Plessis is the son of former Springbok player and head coach, Carel du Plessis. Two of his uncles, Michael du Plessis and Willie du Plessis, are former Springboks. His cousin Daniël du Plessis is also a rugby player that represented the South Africa Under-20 team in 2015. He went to Kenridge Primary School and to Paarl Boys' High School.
