= Willie du Plessis =

Willie du Plessis may refer to:

- Willie du Plessis (rugby union, born 1955), a South African international rugby union player
- Willie du Plessis (rugby union, born 1990), a South African rugby union player
