= Hambly Parker =

South African rugby union player

- Full name: Walter Hambly Parker
- Born: 13 April 1934 Somerset East, South Africa
- Died: 19 September 2014 (aged 80) Port Elizabeth, South Africa
- Height: 1.83 m (6 ft 0 in)
- Weight: 104.3 kg (230 lb)

Rugby union career
- Position: Prop
Provincial / State sides
Years	Team	Apps	(Points)
- Eastern Province
International career
Years	Team	Apps	(Points)
1965	South Africa	2	(0)

Walter Hambly Parker (13 April 1934 – 19 September 2014) was a South African international rugby union player.

Parker was born in Somerset East and educated at Gill College.

A prop, Parker played for Port Elizabeth club Crusaders and represented Eastern Province. He made 14 appearances for the Springboks, which included two official caps. Both of his Test matches came as loose–head prop on the unsuccessful Australian leg of their 1965 tour, for fixtures against the Wallabies in Sydney and Brisbane.

Parker and his wife operated a stud farm near Port Elizabeth for many years.

== See also ==
- List of South Africa national rugby union players
