= Blue Crane Route Local Municipality elections =

Local elections in the Eastern Cape, South Africa

The Blue Crane Route Local Municipality council consists of eleven members elected by mixed-member proportional representation. Six councillors are elected by first-past-the-post voting in six wards, while the remaining five are chosen from party lists so that the total number of party representatives is proportional to the number of votes received.

In the election of 4 November 2026 the African National Congress (ANC) lost its majority, but won a plurality of five seats.

== Results ==
The following table shows the composition of the council after past elections.

| Event | ANC | DA | EFF | Other | Total |
|---|---|---|---|---|---|
| 2000 election | 7 | 3 | — | 0 | 10 |
| 2002 floor-crossing | 7 | 2 | — | 1 | 10 |
| 2006 election | 8 | 2 | — | 0 | 10 |
| 2011 election | 7 | 4 | — | 0 | 11 |
| 2016 election | 7 | 4 | 0 | — | 11 |
| 2021 election | 6 | 4 | 1 | 0 | 11 |
| 2026 election | 5 | 4 | 1 | 1 | 11 |

== December 2000 election ==
The following table shows the results of the 2000 election.

| Party | Ward | | | List | | | Total seats |
| Party | Votes | % | Seats | Votes | % | Seats | Total seats |
|---|---|---|---|---|---|---|---|
| African National Congress | 5,944 | 70.20 | 5 | 5,979 | 70.34 | 2 | 7 |
| Democratic Alliance | 2,361 | 27.88 | 0 | 2,271 | 26.72 | 3 | 3 |
| United Democratic Movement | 162 | 1.91 | 0 | 250 | 2.94 | 0 | 0 |
| Total | 8,467 | 100.00 | 5 | 8,500 | 100.00 | 5 | 10 |
| Valid votes | 8,467 | 98.12 | | 8,500 | 98.29 | | |
| Invalid/blank votes | 162 | 1.88 | | 148 | 1.71 | | |
| Total votes | 8,629 | 100.00 | | 8,648 | 100.00 | | |
| Registered voters/turnout | 15,808 | 54.59 | | 15,808 | 54.71 | | |

=== October 2002 floor crossing ===
In terms of the Eighth Amendment of the Constitution and the judgment of the Constitutional Court in United Democratic Movement v President of the Republic of South Africa and Others, in the period from 8–22 October 2002 councillors had the opportunity to cross the floor to a different political party without losing their seats. In the Blue Crane Route council, one councillor crossed from the Democratic Alliance (DA) to the New National Party (NNP), which had formerly been part of the DA.

| Party | Seats before | Net change | Seats after |
|---|---|---|---|
| African National Congress | 7 | 0 | 7 |
| Democratic Alliance | 3 | ▼1 | 2 |
| New National Party | – | ▲1 | 1 |

=== By-elections from October 2002 to March 2006 ===
The following by-elections were held to fill vacant ward seats in the period between the floor crossing period in October 2002 and the election in March 2006.

| Date | Ward | Party of the previous councillor | Party of the newly elected councillor |
|---|---|---|---|
| 28 July 2004 | 2 | African National Congress | Democratic Alliance |

== March 2006 election ==
The following table shows the results of the 2006 election.

| Party | Ward | | | List | | | Total seats |
| Party | Votes | % | Seats | Votes | % | Seats | Total seats |
|---|---|---|---|---|---|---|---|
| African National Congress | 6,784 | 74.36 | 5 | 6,795 | 74.44 | 3 | 8 |
| Democratic Alliance | 2,059 | 22.57 | 0 | 2,011 | 22.03 | 2 | 2 |
| Pan Africanist Congress of Azania | 231 | 2.53 | 0 | 216 | 2.37 | 0 | 0 |
| United Democratic Movement | 49 | 0.54 | 0 | 106 | 1.16 | 0 | 0 |
| Total | 9,123 | 100.00 | 5 | 9,128 | 100.00 | 5 | 10 |
| Valid votes | 9,123 | 98.02 | | 9,128 | 98.08 | | |
| Invalid/blank votes | 184 | 1.98 | | 179 | 1.92 | | |
| Total votes | 9,307 | 100.00 | | 9,307 | 100.00 | | |
| Registered voters/turnout | 17,453 | 53.33 | | 17,453 | 53.33 | | |

== May 2011 election ==
The following table shows the results of the 2011 election.

| Party | Ward | | | List | | | Total seats |
| Party | Votes | % | Seats | Votes | % | Seats | Total seats |
|---|---|---|---|---|---|---|---|
| African National Congress | 6,203 | 61.53 | 5 | 6,488 | 65.54 | 2 | 7 |
| Democratic Alliance | 3,220 | 31.94 | 1 | 3,411 | 34.46 | 3 | 4 |
| Independent candidates | 659 | 6.54 | 0 | | | | 0 |
| Total | 10,082 | 100.00 | 6 | 9,899 | 100.00 | 5 | 11 |
| Valid votes | 10,082 | 97.74 | | 9,899 | 96.08 | | |
| Invalid/blank votes | 233 | 2.26 | | 404 | 3.92 | | |
| Total votes | 10,315 | 100.00 | | 10,303 | 100.00 | | |
| Registered voters/turnout | 17,451 | 59.11 | | 17,451 | 59.04 | | |

== August 2016 election ==
The following table shows the results of the 2016 election.

| Party | Ward | | | List | | | Total seats |
| Party | Votes | % | Seats | Votes | % | Seats | Total seats |
|---|---|---|---|---|---|---|---|
| African National Congress | 6,770 | 61.44 | 5 | 6,447 | 59.41 | 2 | 7 |
| Democratic Alliance | 4,028 | 36.56 | 1 | 4,188 | 38.59 | 3 | 4 |
| Economic Freedom Fighters | 221 | 2.01 | 0 | 217 | 2.00 | 0 | 0 |
| Total | 11,019 | 100.00 | 6 | 10,852 | 100.00 | 5 | 11 |
| Valid votes | 11,019 | 98.63 | | 10,852 | 98.73 | | |
| Invalid/blank votes | 153 | 1.37 | | 140 | 1.27 | | |
| Total votes | 11,172 | 100.00 | | 10,992 | 100.00 | | |
| Registered voters/turnout | 18,372 | 60.81 | | 18,372 | 59.83 | | |

=== By-elections from August 2016 to November 2021 ===
The following by-elections were held to fill vacant ward seats in the period between the elections in August 2016 and November 2021.

| Date | Ward | Party of the previous councillor | Party of the newly elected councillor |
|---|---|---|---|
| 6 November 2019 | 2 | Democratic Alliance | Democratic Alliance |

== November 2021 election ==
The following table shows the results of the 2021 election.

| Party | Ward | | | List | | | Total seats |
| Party | Votes | % | Seats | Votes | % | Seats | Total seats |
|---|---|---|---|---|---|---|---|
| African National Congress | 5,223 | 56.25 | 4 | 5,260 | 56.50 | 2 | 6 |
| Democratic Alliance | 3,455 | 37.21 | 2 | 3,450 | 37.06 | 2 | 4 |
| Economic Freedom Fighters | 582 | 6.27 | 0 | 575 | 6.18 | 1 | 1 |
| African Transformation Movement | 6 | 0.06 | 0 | 25 | 0.27 | 0 | 0 |
| Independent candidates | 20 | 0.22 | 0 | | | | 0 |
| Total | 9,286 | 100.00 | 6 | 9,310 | 100.00 | 5 | 11 |
| Valid votes | 9,286 | 98.73 | | 9,310 | 98.75 | | |
| Invalid/blank votes | 119 | 1.27 | | 118 | 1.25 | | |
| Total votes | 9,405 | 100.00 | | 9,428 | 100.00 | | |
| Registered voters/turnout | 17,867 | 52.64 | | 17,867 | 52.77 | | |

=== By-elections from November 2021 ===
The following by-elections were held to fill vacant ward seats in the period since November 2021.

| Date | Ward | Party of the previous councillor | Party of the newly elected councillor |
|---|---|---|---|
| 22 February 2023 | 2 | Democratic Alliance | Democratic Alliance |
| 22 February 2023 | 5 | Democratic Alliance | Democratic Alliance |
| 24 April 2024 | 4 | African National Congress | Democratic Alliance |

In ward 2, existing DA councillor Archer Heynse's membership was terminated for not settling outstanding 2021 election fees. He applied to have his membership reinstated and again represented the DA, holding onto his seat by 10 votes over the ANC, in what was seen to be a safe seat, with a 25% margin in the 2021 elections.

In ward 5, where the DA had won the ward for the first time in 2021, the councillor also had his membership terminated, but did not stand again. Lorraine Johnson narrowly held on to the marginal seat for the party.

== November 2026 election ==
The following table shows the results of the 2026 election.

| Party | Ward | | | List | | | Total seats |
| Party | Votes | % | Seats | Votes | % | Seats | Total seats |
|---|---|---|---|---|---|---|---|
| African National Congress | 4,576 | 44.95 | 2 | 4,635 | 45.55 | 3 | 5 |
| Democratic Alliance | 3,830 | 37.62 | 4 | 3,812 | 37.46 | 0 | 4 |
| Patriotic Alliance | 1,209 | 11.88 | 0 | 1,196 | 11.75 | 1 | 1 |
| Economic Freedom Fighters | 293 | 2.88 | 0 | 286 | 2.81 | 1 | 1 |
| Freedom Front Plus | 101 | 0.99 | 0 | 120 | 1.18 | 0 | 0 |
| South African Communist Party | 62 | 0.61 | 0 | 57 | 0.56 | 0 | 0 |
| Independent candidates | 63 | 0.62 | 0 | | | | 0 |
| uMkhonto weSizwe Party | 17 | 0.17 | 0 | 28 | 0.28 | 0 | 0 |
| African Transformation Movement | 15 | 0.15 | 0 | 27 | 0.27 | 0 | 0 |
| Afrika Mayibuye Movement | 15 | 0.15 | 0 | 15 | 0.15 | 0 | 0 |
| Total | 10,181 | 100.00 | 6 | 10,176 | 100.00 | 5 | 11 |
| Valid votes | 10,181 | 98.90 | | 10,176 | 98.93 | | |
| Invalid/blank votes | 113 | 1.10 | | 110 | 1.07 | | |
| Total votes | 10,294 | 100.00 | | 10,286 | 100.00 | | |
| Registered voters/turnout | 19,333 | 53.25 | | 19,333 | 53.20 | | |
