= Carel du Plessis =

South African rugby union coach and player

- Born: Carel Johan du Plessis; 24 June 1960 (age 66) Somerset East, Eastern Cape, South Africa
- Height: 1.84 m (6 ft 0 in)
- Weight: 85 kg (187 lb)
- School: Paarl Boys High
- University: Stellenbosch University

Rugby union career
- Position(s): Wing, Centre
Provincial / State sides
Years	Team	Apps	(Points)
1980–1986, 1988–1989	Western Province		
1987	Transvaal		
International career
Years	Team	Apps	(Points)
1982–1989	South Africa	12	(16)
Coaching career
- Years: Team
- 1997: South Africa

Carel Johan du Plessis (born 24 June 1960) is a former South African rugby union coach and player.

== Playing career ==
Du Plessis played for Western Province and the Springboks, his skills earning him the nickname the Prince of Wings. He is ranked among the best Springbok wings of all-time, although he was only capped 12 times, scoring 4 tries, with his international career curtailed by the sports boycott against apartheid South Africa.

=== Test history ===
No.	Opposition	Result (SA 1st)	Position	Tries	Date	Venue
1.	South American Jaguars	50–18	Wing	1	27 March 1982	Loftus Versveld, Pretoria
2.	South American Jaguars	12–21	Wing		3 April 1982	Free State Stadium, Bloemfontein
3.	England	33–15	Wing	1	2 June 1984	Boet Erasmus Stadium, Port Elizabeth
4.	England	35–9	Wing		9 June 1984	Ellis Park, Johannesburg
5.	South American Jaguars	32–15	Wing		20 October 1984	Loftus Versfeld, Pretoria
6.	South American Jaguars	21–13	Wing	1	27 October 1984	Newlands, Cape Town
7.	New Zealand Cavaliers	21–15	Wing	1	10 May 1986	Newlands, Cape Town
8.	New Zealand Cavaliers	18–19	Wing		17 May 1986	Kings Park, Durban
9.	New Zealand Cavaliers	33–18	Wing		24 May 1986	Loftus Versfeld, Pretoria
10.	New Zealand Cavaliers	24–10	Wing		31 May 1986	Ellis Park, Johannesburg
11.	World XV	20–19	Wing		26 Aug 1989	Newlands, Cape Town
12.	World XV	22–16	Wing		2 Sep 1989	Ellis Park, Johannesburg

== Coaching career ==
In late February 1997, du Plessis was appointed coach of the Springboks, succeeding Andre Markgraaff, despite a lack of coaching experience. He led the team to defeat in both the British and Irish Lions' 1997 tour and the 1997 Tri-Nations, before being sacked and replaced by Nick Mallett, his last game as coach being a 61–22 win over Australia. He was subsequently an assistant coach for Western Province and the Stormers, with Gert Smal.

== Personal ==
Du Plessis is the brother of Michael du Plessis and Willie du Plessis, both former Springboks, father of Jean-Luc du Plessis, who plays for the Stormers, and uncle of Daniël du Plessis, a former South Africa U20 player.

He has undergone three major surgeries after a brain tumour was discovered in January 2019.

== See also ==
- List of South Africa national rugby union players – Springbok no. 523

Sporting positions
Preceded by (South Africa) Andre Markgraaff	South Africa National Rugby Union Coach; 1997–1997	Succeeded by (South Africa) Nick Mallett
