= Pearston =

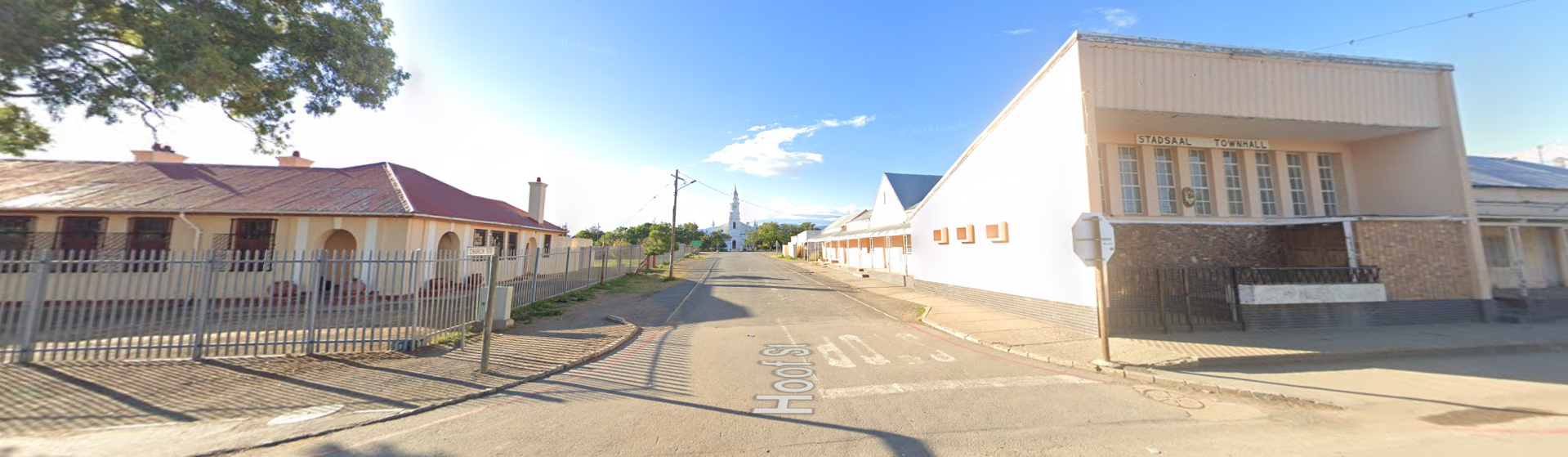
- Pearston seen from Voortrekker Street.

- Location within Eastern Cape Location within South Africa
- Coordinates: 32°34′54″S 25°08′16″E
- Country: South Africa
- Province: Eastern Cape
- District: Sarah Baartman
- Municipality: Blue Crane Route
- Established: 1859

Area
  - Total: 32.8 km^{2} (12.7 sq mi)

Population (2011)
  - Total: 4,516
  - Density: 138/km^{2} (357/sq mi)

Racial makeup (2011)
  - Black African: 37.4%
  - Coloured: 59.3%
  - Indian/Asian: 0.6%
  - White: 1.9%
  - Other: 0.8%

First languages (2011)
  - Afrikaans: 67.6%
  - Xhosa: 27.9%
  - English: 2.5%
  - Other: 2.0%
- Time zone: UTC+2 (SAST)
- Postal code (street): 5860
- PO box: 5860
- Area code: 042

Pearston is a small town in the eastern Karoo, in the Eastern Cape province of South Africa. It lies between Graaff-Reinet and KwaNojoli at the foot of the Coetzeesberge, about 160 kilometres (100 mi) north of Port Elizabeth. It falls within the Blue Crane Route Local Municipality and has a population of approximately 4,500 people.

== History ==
In 1850 John Pears, a former professor of Classics at the South African College and the minister of the Dutch Reformed Church in the town of Somerset (now Somerset East) began holding services in the open under a large pear tree on the farm Rustenburg, then the property of Mr Casparus Jacobus Lötter, on the bank of the Voël River. In 1858 the church announced its intention to establish a village named Pearston on that location. A portion of the farm was purchased and lots sold, and the village was officially founded on 21 September 1859. It became a town with municipal government on 3 April 1894.

== Government ==
Pearston falls within the Blue Crane Route Local Municipality, which has its seat at Somerset East, and forms part of the larger Cacadu District Municipality. It is located in the fourth ward of the municipality, which is represented by Councillor Mncedi Mali of the African National Congress.

== Geography ==
Pearston is located about 160 kilometres (100 mi) north of Port Elizabeth, on the banks of the Voël River. It is situated at an altitude of 710 metres (2,330 ft) on the Camdeboo plain. The Coetzeesberge, a spur of the Sneeuberge (a mountain), lie to the north, and the Groot-Bruintjieshoogte lie to the east. Pearston is the meeting point of two regional roads: the R63 from Graaff-Reinet to KwaNojoli and Cookhouse, and the R337 from Jansenville to Cradock.

== Demography ==
According to the 2011 Census 3,435 people live in Pearston proper, and a further 1,081 live in the adjacent township of Khayanisho, giving the urban area a total population of 4,516. 56.9% of the people described themselves as "Coloured", 39.3% as "Black African", 3.5% as "White" and 0.3% as "Indian or Asian". 64.2% of the people spoke Afrikaans as their first language, while 35.4% spoke Xhosa and 0.4% spoke English.
