= Gill College =

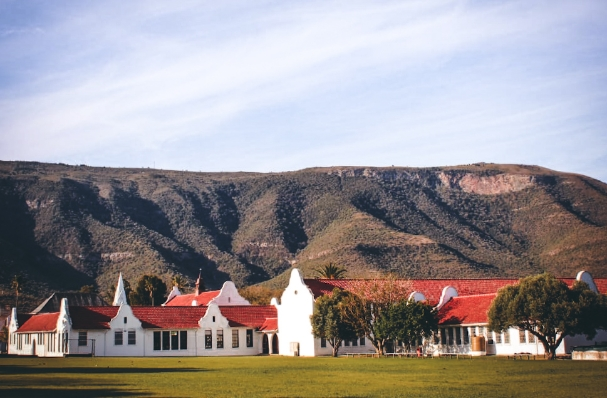

Location
- College Rd; Somerset East, Eastern Cape; South Africa; 32°43′15.4″S 25°35′18.5″E

Information
- Motto: Sursum Prorsusque
- Established: 1869; 157 years ago
- Grades: 8–12
- Gender: Co-educational
- Accreditation: Eastern Cape Education Department

Gill College is a dual-medium (Afrikaans and English), co-educational public high school in KwaNojoli, formerly Somerset East, Sarah Baartman District Municipality. It provides education for grades 8–12, serving students from all cultural backgrounds. The college was established in 1869, and is one of South Africa's oldest standing schools, with the original buildings preserved as heritage sites.

== History ==
Gill College was established through a bequest from Dr. William Gill (1795–1863), a Bristish-born surgeon who arrived in the Cape Colony in 1818 and who was appointed as the District Surgeon of Somerset in 1829. Beyond medicine, he acquired a number of farms in the district and became a wealthy merino sheep farmer. In his will dated 19 January 1863 he bequeathed £23 000 for the establishment of a college of higher education. It was stipulated in his will that the funds not be used for buying or erecting buildings, and that assets in the estate including property not be sold.

The Gill College Corporation was formed with seven trustees, including Dr. Langham Dale, local lawyer James Leonard and Robert Hart, to manage the endowment. Philip Wodehouse, the Governor of the Cape Good Hope, granted the Gill College Corporation land in Somerset East on 16 April 1867, for the sole purpose of erecting buildings for the educational institution.

A committee formed in 1865 under the chairmanship of Robert Bowker, appealed to the local community for public subscriptions and support to supplement Dr. Gill’s bequest for building the college. The initial plans of the campus were drafted by James Bisset, basing the architecture of the college on that of the University of Glasgow. The foundation stone was laid in late 1867 and Gill College was officially opened on 18 March 1869, under the Rectorship of Peter MacOwan.

The Gill College Act No. 32 of 1884 amended the restrictions of Gill's final will, in that it allowed for the sale of Erf 57, Paulett Street, including the building thereon, and that the proceeds be used to build student accommodation on the college property. The residence, College House, was completed in 1892 on the college campus.

Like other Cape colleges, it was an affiliated teaching college, with the University of the Cape of Good Hope examining and awarding degrees, and its constituent colleges doing the teaching. Gill College's remote frontier-town setting and small scale worked against it, and it could not satisfy the rule limiting university-college status to institutions with more than 75 matriculated pupils. By 1903 the Eastern Cape was moving toward a single central university college: St Andrew’s College Council agreed on 5 March 1903 that one should be founded, and Rhodes University College was established by act of parliament on 31 May 1904. Gill College lost its college status and became a high school in 1903, a change attributed to changes in educational regulations. The school was co-educational before 1928 and again after 1965, when it amalgamated with Bellevue Girls’ School (originally Bellevue Seminary); between those years it operated as a boys-only institution.

Bellevue Seminary was founded to address the lack of formal education for girls in the town. Until 1880 only two small private schools served girls, while boys attended Gill College. At the urging of the local Dutch Reformed minister, Rev. J.H. Hofmeyr, the church council acquired land in Paulet Street and laid the foundation stone on 19 July 1881. Designed by architect Carl Otto Hager, the building cost £5 000 and opened on 29 September 1882 under its first principal, Miss Jane Wright of Aberdeen, Scotland. The original structure later served as a boarding house and teachers’ residence. Government support began in 1885, additional buildings followed in 1895, and in 1906 a substantial new school block with an assembly hall and seven classrooms was opened by Cape Governor Sir Walter Hely-Hutchinson. The institution was raised to full high-school status in 1925. When it amalgamated with Gill College in 1965, a new senior girls’ hostel had just been completed; that building remains in use by Gill College today. The original Seminary buildings were later taken over for military use by the now-disbanded Somerset East Commando and have since deteriorated.

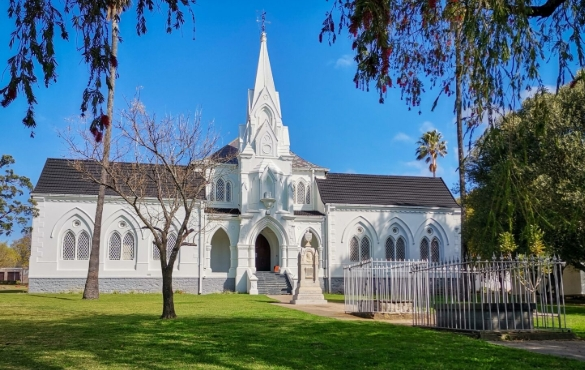
The original Gill College building, with Dr. Gill's grave and memorial and Mr. Coppens' grave in the foreground

The Gill Corporation Private Act of 1912 allowed for the Trustees to grant 3-year bursaries ("Gill Bursaries") to deserving students who passed the Matriculation Examination or the University Senior Certificate examination of the Cape of Good Hope, to further their studies at an acceptable institution within or outside the Union of South Africa.

The 1950s to 1970s saw Gill College emerge as a dominant force in schoolboy rugby in the Eastern Cape, as a result of the role played by legendary teacher and coach C.A. Coppens. Coppens was a mathematics teacher at the school from 1935 to 1984. He is buried next to Dr. Gill in front of the Old College building.

In 1916 Dr. Gill's remains were reburied in front of the school which he endowed, and a monument was erected next to the grave in 1923.

== Gill College coat of arms ==
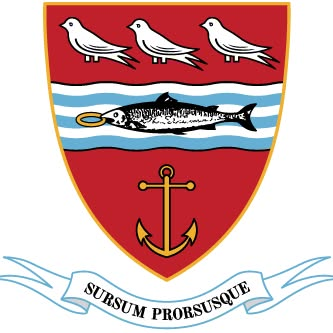
Gill College Coat of Arms

The Shield is divided into 3 sections horizontally:

- Three Footless Martlets: From the ancient Gill family crest (Scottish Lowlands origin, linked to clans like MacGill or Gill of Devorgilla). Martlets symbolize swiftness, migration (echoing Gill's journey from Scotland to the Cape), and the "winged" pursuit of knowledge without earthly ties (footless = ungrounded, ever-ascending).
- Fish (Salmon) with Ring in Mouth: Directly from the arms of the City of Glasgow and University of Glasgow (where Dr. Gill trained as a surgeon and the architectural inspiration for Gill College). It references the miracle of Saint Mungo (aka St Kentigern), Glasgow's patron saint, who recovered a lost ring from a fish's mouth to vindicate Queen Languoreth. This evokes themes of providence, truth, redemption, and the "hidden treasures" of learning.
- Sheet Anchor: The Cape Colony's colonial badge (introduced 1806), representing hope, stability, and the "anchor" of British education in the frontier. It grounds the Scottish elements in the local context.

The motto is "Sursum Prorsusque", inscribed on a blue riband below the shield. Translation: "Upwards and Onwards," emphasizing aspiration, resilience, and forward progress.

== Rectors and headmasters ==
- Peter MacOwen (1869 - 1881) was the first Rector of Gill College. He had previously served as principal of Shaw College in Grahamstown. At Gill College he headed the natural sciences department and contributed significantly to South African botany, especially the study of lichens and fungi. He later became a Director of the Cape Town Botanical Gardens and curator of the Cape Government Herbarium.
- Robert MacWilliam (1881 - 1903)
- William J. Gall (Rector 1903 - 1909; Headmaster 1909 - 1936)
- F. E. de Villiers (1937 - 1955)
- H. Winkler (1956 - 1960)
- S. D. Naudé (1960 - date unknown)
- Nic Viljoen (date unknown - 1980s)
- Tienie Koen (1980s - 2005)
- Steven Zietsman (2005 - 2014)
- Marina Marais (acting, post 2014)
- Hein van Heerden (2016 - 2018)
- Shirley Slater-Billett (2018 - 2026)
- Neil Schreuder (from May 2026 - present)

== Notable alumni ==
- James Weston Leonard was a South African barrister, politician, and Attorney-General of the Cape Colony.
- Sir James Rose Innes served as the second Chief Justice of South Africa from 1914 to 1927 and is widely regarded as one of the country’s greatest jurists.
- Jan Pieter de Lange was a prominent educationalist and chairman of the Afrikaner Broederbond.
- Hambly Parker, Hannes Marais, Michael du Plessis, Willie du Plessis and Anton Meiring, former South African rugby union players
