= Michael du Plessis =

South African rugby union footballer

- Born: Michael Josias du Plessis; 4 November 1958 (age 68) Somerset East, Eastern Cape
- Height: 1.88 m (6 ft 2 in)
- Weight: 87 kg (192 lb)
- School: Gill College, Somerset East
- University: Stellenbosch University
- Notable relative(s): Willie du Plessis (brother), Carel du Plessis (brother)

Rugby union career
- Position(s): Centre, Fly-half
Provincial / State sides
Years	Team	Apps	(Points)
1982–1986, 1988–1989	Western Province		
1985	Northern Transvaal		
1987	Transvaal		
1990–1992	Eastern Province		
International career
Years	Team	Apps	(Points)
1984–1989	South Africa	8	(7)

Michael Josias du Plessis (born 4 November 1958) is a former South African rugby union player.

== Playing career ==
Du Plessis played for Western Province, Northern Transvaal, Transvaal, Eastern Province and the Springboks. He made his test debut against the visiting South American Jaguars team on 20 October 1984. Capped 8 times, he scored 1 try for the Springboks.

=== Test history ===
No.	Opponents	Results (RSA 1st)	Position	Points	Dates	Venue
1.	South American Jaguars	32–15	Centre		20 Oct 1984	Loftus Versfeld, Pretoria
2.	South American Jaguars	22–13	Centre		27 Oct 1984	Newlands, Cape Town
3.	New Zealand Cavaliers	21–15	Centre		10 May 1986	Newlands, Cape Town
4.	New Zealand Cavaliers	18–19	Centre		17 May 1986	Kings Park, Durban
5.	New Zealand Cavaliers	33–18	Centre		24 May 1986	Loftus Versveld, Pretoria
6.	New Zealand Cavaliers	24–10	Centre	3 (dropgoal)	31 May 1986	Ellis Park, Johannesburg
7.	World XV	20–19	Centre		26 Aug 1989	Newlands, Cape Town
8.	World XV	22–16	Centre	4 (try)	2 Sep 1989	Ellis Park, Johannesburg

== Personal ==
Du Plessis is the brother of Willie du Plessis and Carel du Plessis, both former Springboks, and the father of Daniël du Plessis.

== See also ==
- List of South Africa national rugby union players – Springbok no. 537
