= Willie du Plessis (rugby union, born 1955) =

South African rugby union footballer

- Born: Willem du Plessis; 4 September 1955 (age 71) Somerset East, Eastern Cape, South Africa
- Height: 1.80 m (5 ft 11 in)
- Weight: 83 kg (183 lb)
- School: Gill College, Somerset East
- University: Stellenbosch University
- Notable relative(s): Carel du Plessis (brother); Dan du Plessis (nephew); Jean-Luc du Plessis (nephew); Lizaan du Plessis (daughter); Michael du Plessis (brother)

Rugby union career
Amateur team(s)
Years	Team	Apps	(Points)
- Maties
Provincial / State sides
Years	Team	Apps	(Points)
1977–1982	Western Province	67	(160)
International career
Years	Team	Apps	(Points)
1980–1982	South Africa	14	(12 [3t])

Willem du Plessis (born 4 September 1955) is a former South African rugby union player.

== Early life ==
Du Plessis was born in Somerset East in the Eastern Cape province of South Africa. His father, also named Willie, played provincial rugby for Eastern Province and his maternal grandfather, Michael Josias du Plessis played for Western Province in 1923 and 1924. Du Plessis was educated at Gill College in Somerset East and in 1973, represented North Eastern Cape at the annual Craven Week tournament. He also represented Eastern Province at the South African junior athletics championships.

== Playing career ==
In 1975, du Plessis enrolled at Stellenbosch University for a degree in Physical Education and in 1977 made his debut for Western Province. Between 1977 and 1982, he played 67 matches for Western Province and was a member of the Western Province team that won the Currie Cup in 1982. Two of his brothers, Michael and Carel, were also in the 1982 Currie Cup winning team.

Du Plessis made his test debut for the Springboks against the visiting South American Jaguars team on 26 April 1980 and in so doing became the 500th Springbok rugby player. He was capped 14 times and scored 3 test tries for the Springboks. Du Plessis also played in six tour matches, scoring four tries for the Springboks. He retired at the end of the 1982 season, at the age of 26, to take up farming.

=== Test history ===
No.	Opposition	Result (SA 1st)	Position	Tries	Date	Venue
1.	South American Jaguars	24–9	Centre		26 April 1980	Wanderers Stadium, Johannesburg
2.	South American Jaguars	18–9	Centre		3 May 1980	Kings Park Stadium, Durban
3.	British Lions	26–22	Centre	1	31 May 1980	Newlands, Cape Town
4.	(British & Irish Lions) British Lions	26–19	Centre		14 June 1980	Free State Stadium, Bloemfontein
5.	(British & Irish Lions) British Lions	12–10	Centre		28 June 1980	Boet Erasmus Stadium, Port Elizabeth
6.	(British & Irish Lions) British Lions	13–17	Centre	1	12 July 1980	Loftus Versfeld, Pretoria
7.	South American Jaguars	22–13	Centre		18 October 1980	Wanderers Club, Montevideo
8.	South American Jaguars	30–16	Centre		25 October 1980	Prince of Wales Country Club, Santiago
9.	France	37–15	Centre		8 November 1980	Loftus Versfeld, Pretoria
10.	New Zealand	9–14	Centre		15 August 1981	Lancaster Park, Christchurch
11.	New Zealand	24–12	Centre		29 August 1981	Athletic Park, Wellington
12.	New Zealand	22–25	Centre		12 September 1981	Eden Park, Auckland
13.	South American Jaguars	50–18	Centre	1	27 March 1982	Loftus Versfeld, Pretoria
14.	South American Jaguars	12–21	Centre		3 April 1982	Free State Stadium, Bloemfontein

== Accolades ==
In 1979, du Plessis was named one of the five South African Young Players of the Year, along with Darius Botha, Doug Jeffrey, Andre Markgraaff and Gawie Visagie.

== Personal ==
Du Plessis is the brother of Michael du Plessis and Carel du Plessis, both former Springboks and the father of Lizaan du Plessis, a former professional tennis player. His fourth brother, Jacques du Plessis played provincial rugby for Western Province and Eastern Province. During the latter part of the 2000s, Du Plessis emigrated to Australia and resides in Sydney.

== See also ==
- List of South Africa national rugby union players – Springbok no. 500
