= Cookhouse, South Africa =

Cookhouse Kookhuis
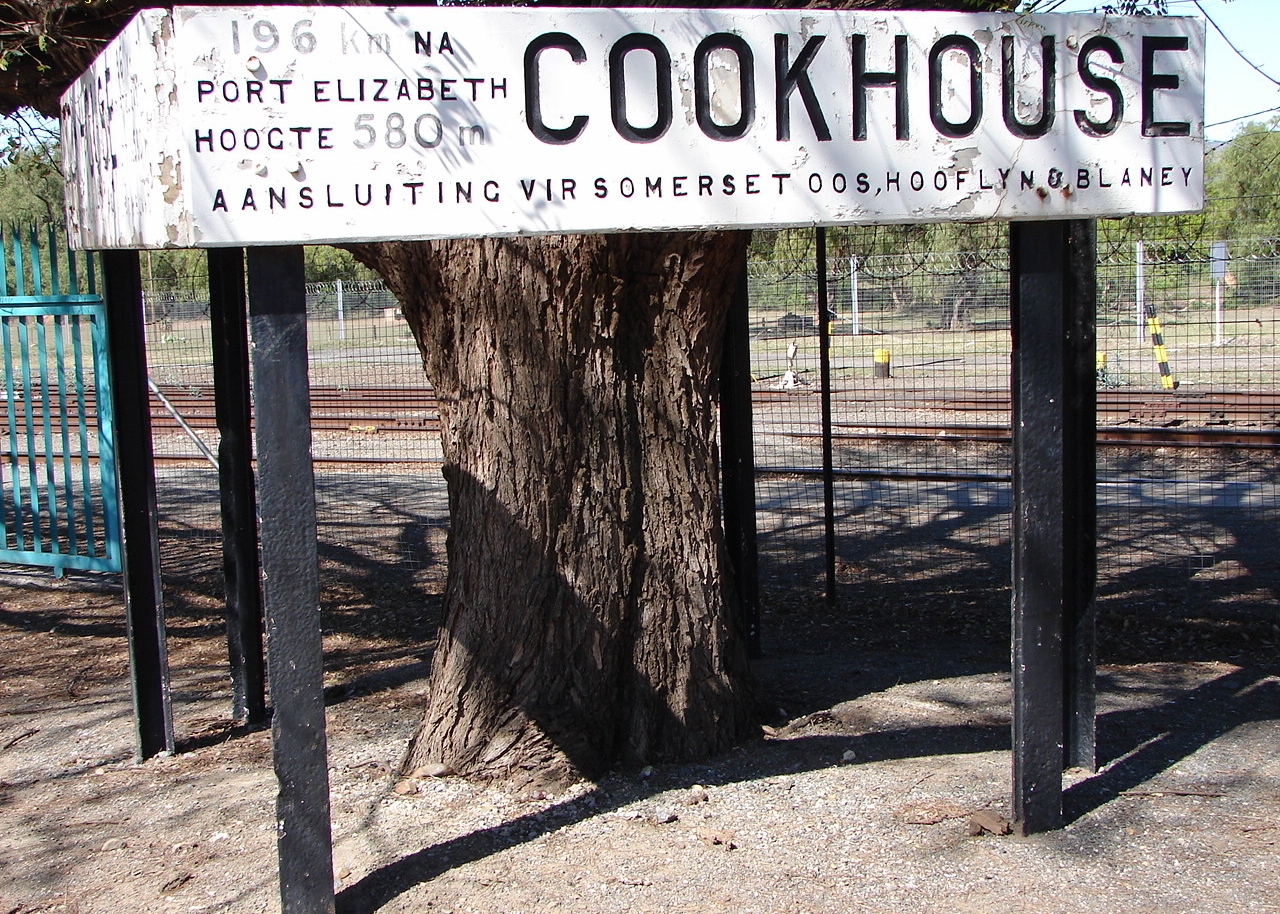
- Cookhouse station sign

- Location within Eastern Cape Location within South Africa
- Coordinates: 32°44′43″S 25°48′17″E
- Country: South Africa
- Province: Eastern Cape
- District: Sarah Baartman
- Municipality: Blue Crane Route

Area
  - Total: 50.98 km^{2} (19.68 sq mi)
- Elevation: 585 m (1,919 ft)

Population (2011)
  - Total: 5,707
  - Density: 111.9/km^{2} (289.9/sq mi)

Racial makeup (2011)
  - Black African: 80.7%
  - Coloured: 16.0%
  - Indian/Asian: 0.2%
  - White: 2.8%
  - Other: 0.4%

First languages (2011)
  - Xhosa: 75.4%
  - Afrikaans: 19.7%
  - English: 2.5%
  - Other: 2.4%
- Time zone: UTC+2 (SAST)
- Postal code (street): 5820
- PO box: 5820
- Area code: 042

Cookhouse (Afrikaans: Kookhuis) is a small village located in Eastern Cape province, South Africa, some 170 kilometres (110 mi) north of Port Elizabeth and 24 kilometres (15 mi) east of KwaNojoli, on the west bank of the Great Fish River.

Cookhouse is part of the Blue Crane Route Municipality, situated in Sarah Baartman District, in the Eastern Cape, South Africa. Cookhouse was an early colonial settlement. The Scottish abolitionist and poet, Thomas Pringle mentions Cookhouse in his journal. The town was also visited by early explorers and writers such as Dutch military commander Robert Jacob Gordon and French traveller François Levaillant. Gordon's stay in South Africa produced scientific writings, drawings and maps about the region.

The town is home to the Cookhouse Wind Farm which comprises 66 turbines. The farm became operational in November 2014 and supplies clean energy to the Eskom grid.

== History ==
The Great Fish River formed the eastern boundary of the Cape Colony until 1819. The current village is said to take its name from a small stone house used for shelter and cooking by troops camping on the bank of this river. Another explanation links the name to the hot climate as experienced by the troops stationed there.

The Cookhouse is located on what was the Roodewal farm owned by Frans Johannes van Aardt in the 1770s. He was born on 12 September 1777 in Somerset East and died in 1856. Frans Johannes van Aardt was married twice; first to Susanna Wilhelmina Tregardt on 21 October 1798. She died in 1825 aged 27. Another theory is that the town got its name is in the late 1790s because Susanna van Aardt supplied provisions from her "cookhouse" (or outdoor kitchen) to riders and soldiers waiting to cross the Great Fish River. After her death, Frans Johannes married Maria Johanna Mentz in 1826.

In the 1870s, the government of Prime Minister John Molteno oversaw a massive expansion of the Cape Colony's railway system, and a route northwards to De Aar from Port Elizabeth and Port Alfred was chosen by the Cape Government Railways to pass through what is now Cookhouse. A station was built here, which became an important railway junction, and a small settlement formed around this connection.

This railway station in Cookhouse is an attraction that was written about in Cookhouse Station, a poem by Chris Mann that describes how he imagines the railway station was at its peak.

== Monuments and museums ==
- Cookhouse is home to the Slachter's Nek monument, commemorating the hanging of the five rebels of the Slachter's Nek Rebellion who were sentenced by the British to be hanged in public. The monument was erected in 1916, 100 years after the execution.
- Cookhouse is home to Thomas Pringle's Cairn, a memorial built to commemorate his passage through the town.
- The Fallen Heroes Memorial was unveiled in 2007 to commemorate Cookhouse residents who lost their lives in the struggle against apartheid in South Africa.
- The Fairworld Fine Wool Museum used to be located in Cookhouse but was moved to Mulberry Grove Farm north of Cradock in 2016.
