= Dan du Plessis =

South African rugby union player

- Full name: Daniël Michael du Plessis
- Born: 17 March 1995 (age 31) Port Elizabeth, South Africa
- Height: 1.87 m (6 ft 1 1/2 in)
- Weight: 97 kg (15 st 4 lb; 214 lb)
- School: Paul Roos Gymnasium, Stellenbosch
- Notable relative(s): Michael du Plessis (father); Carel du Plessis (uncle); Willie du Plessis (uncle); Jean-Luc du Plessis (cousin)

Rugby union career
- Position: Centre
- Current team: Stormers / Western Province
Youth career
- 2013–2016: Western Province
Senior career
Years	Team	Apps	(Points)
2016–2026	Western Province	45	(90)
2016–2026	Stormers	95	(65)
- Correct as of 23 July 2022
International career
Years	Team	Apps	(Points)
2013	South Africa Schools	2	(0)
2015	South Africa Under-20	5	(5)
- Correct as of 18 April 2018

Daniël Michael du Plessis (born 17 March 1995) is a South African rugby union player for the Stormers in Super Rugby. His regular position is centre.

== Career ==
=== Youth ===
Du Plessis' first provincial selection came in 2013, when he was selected to represent Western Province at the Under-18 Craven Week tournament held in Polokwane. He started in their first match against the Pumas and ran in four tries in a 40–24 victory. He also played against the Blue Bulls and in the unofficial final against the Golden Lions, where he scored another try to secure victory for Western Province.

At the conclusion of the tournament, he was also named in a South African Schools squad and he represented them in matches against England and France.

Du Plessis played for the Western Province U19 side in the 2014 Under-19 Provincial Championship, scoring two tries in five matches to help his team all the way to the final, where they beat the Blue Bulls U19s 33–26.

In 2015, Du Plessis was named in the Western Province squad for the 2015 Vodacom Cup, but failed to make any appearances. Instead he linked up with the South Africa Under-20 squad. He was initially named in a 37-man training squad and also started for them in a friendly match against a Varsity Cup Dream Team, scoring a try in a 31–24 victory in a friendly match against a Varsity Cup Dream Team at the conclusion of the 2015 Varsity Cup competition. He was then named in their squad to tour Argentina for a two-match series as preparation for the 2015 World Rugby Under 20 Championship. He started both their 25–22 victory over Argentina in the first match, and their 39–28 win in the second match four days later.

Upon the team's return, he was named in the final squad for the 2015 World Rugby Under 20 Championship. He started all three of their matches in Pool B of the competition; a 33–5 win against hosts Italy, a 40–8 win against Samoa and a 46–13 win over Australia. He helped South Africa finish top of Pool B to qualify for the semi-finals with the best record pool stage of all the teams in the competition. Du Plessis also started their semi-final match against England and scored a try in the final minutes of the match, which wasn't enough to prevent them losing the match 20–28 to be eliminated from the competition by England for the second year in succession. He started their third-place play-off match against France, helping South Africa to a 31–18 win to win the bronze medal.

== Personal ==
Du Plessis is the son of former Springbok player Michael du Plessis and the nephew of former Springbok players Carel du Plessis and Willie du Plessis.

Du Plessis is the cousin of Jean-Luc du Plessis, who is also a professional rugby player.
