= St. Mary's Cathedral, Cape Town =

Catholic cathedral in Cape Town, South Africa

St. Mary's Cathedral
- The Metropolitan Cathedral of Saint Mary of the Flight into Egypt
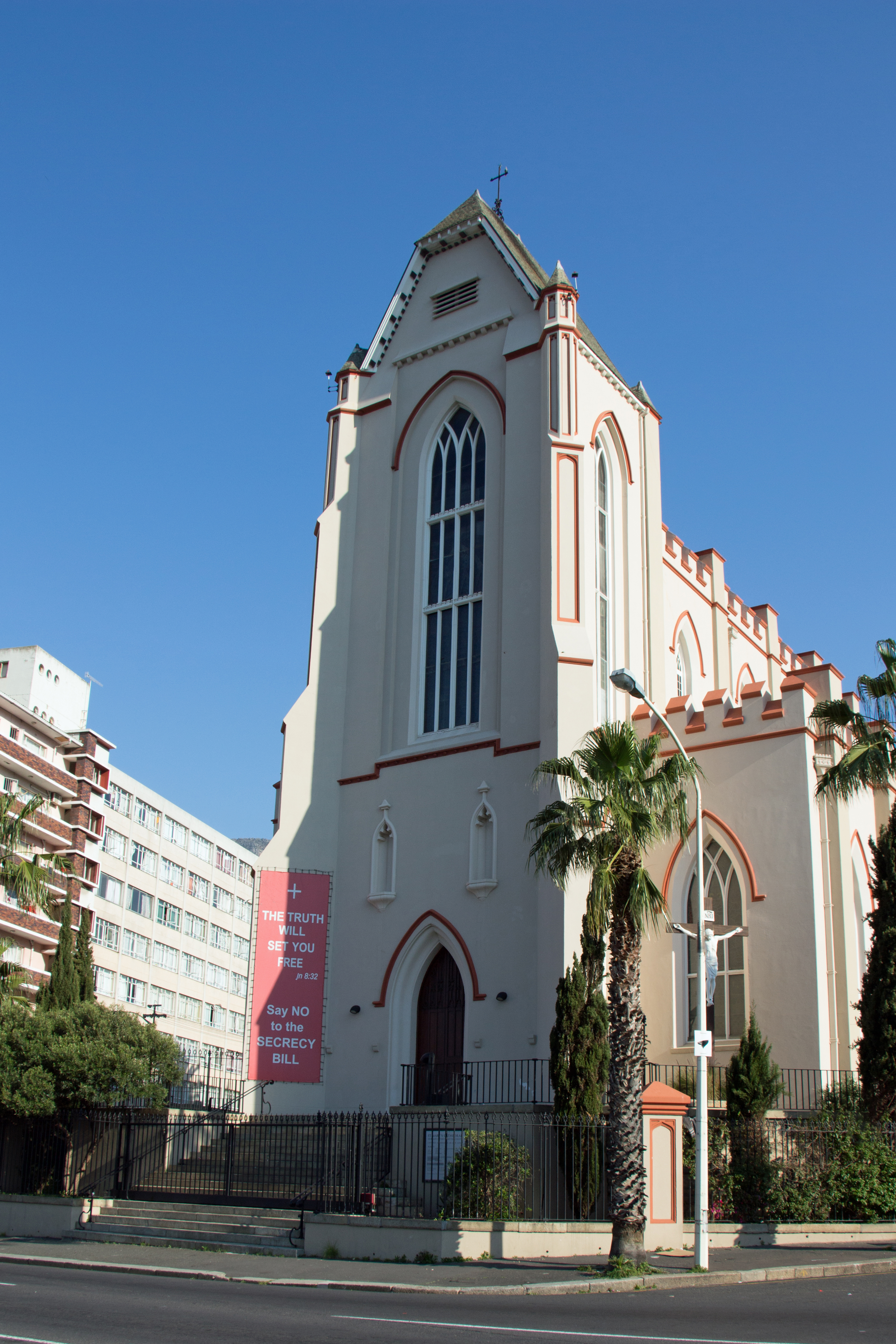

- Location within South Africa
- 33°55′41.75″S 18°25′09.71″E
- Location: Cape Town
- Country: South Africa
- Denomination: Roman Catholic Church
- Website: www.stmaryscathedral.org.za

History
- Founded: 1851
- Dedicated: 28 April 1851
- Consecrated: 21 April 1951

Architecture
- Architect: Carl Otto Hager
- Style: Neo-gothic
- Years built: 1841 - 1851

Administration
- Division: Patrick Raymond Griffith, O.P., Thomas Grimley, John Leonard, John Rooney, Bernard Cornelius O’Riley, Franziskus Xaver Hennemann, S.A.C., Owen Cardinal McCann, Stephen Naidoo, C.Ss.R., Lawrence Patrick Henry
- Province: Western Cape
- Archdiocese: Metropolitan Archdiocese of Cape Town, South Africa
- Deanery: City Bowl

Clergy
- Archbishop: Sede vacante
- Bishop: The Right Rev. Sylvester David OMI
- Dean: Fr Dr Robert Bissell

St. Mary's Cathedral, more formally known as the Cathedral of Saint Mary of the Flight into Egypt, is the cathedral and mother church of the Roman Catholic Archdiocese of Cape Town, located in the City Bowl of Cape Town, South Africa. in South Africa. It lies in Stalplein, directly opposite the Houses of Parliament.

== History ==
The oldest Catholic cathedral in the country, St. Mary's history is intimately linked with the history and development of the Catholic Church in South Africa over a period of more than 175 years; it is mother church not only to the "Mother City" and the archdiocese, but to all Catholics in Southern Africa.

Bishop Patrick Raymond Griffith, O.P., the Vicar Apostolic of the Cape of Good Hope, bought land in 1839 and the first stone was laid two years later. The edifice was designed in the Gothic Revival style by Carl Otto Hager, the architect behind several Dutch Reformed churches which are also listed heritage sites. It was consecrated on April 28, 1851.

Architect Fred M. Glennie carried out the "Bavarian" Arts and Crafts changes to St Mary's Cathedral in 1927; a tower was added, the parapet crenelations were removed, and the roof remodelled to be a bell cast. The original Siena, Sicilian and Galway marble altar and plaster mouldings, completed in 1865, were removed and the sanctuary was re-modeled in 1947. A simplified Italian marble altar with a solid silver tabernacle replaced the original. Oak panelling, carved by Spanish artist F Cuairan, cases the sanctuary walls and was dedicated to the memory of parishioners who gave their lives during the Second World War. In 1951 the church was consecrated as a cathedral when Pope Pius XII elevated the apostolic vicariate of Cape Town to the status of metropolitan archdiocese.

The last cathedral restoration was carried out in 1997 by architect Denise Corna Boers. The roof was cut back to the original position, and the crenelations were reintroduced to the parapets. The new tower with the Irish bell was retained. The bell, weighing 2200 kg, was cast by Sheridan of Dublin and donated by the Marquis of Bute. The sanctuary was remodeled, with the altar brought forward to face the congregation and a Crown of Thorns with lighting (designed by architect Steven Boers) was made by Jan Corewijn and suspended over the altar area. Jan Correwijn exposed and restored section of the original Victorian decorative stenciled paintwork within the cathedral. Some of this stencil work is attributed to architect Samual Stonestreet, who in 1864 decorated the chancel. On each side of the sanctuary are two pairs of columns with a painted green marble effect. The capitals of the columns have South African flower and leaf motifs which are gold leafed. The cathedral has seventeen stained glass windows made by Mayer of Munich and Bardman of Birmingham, inscribed with the donors' names. The elaborate oak pulpit was carved in Cape Town by Tweedie and erected for the dedication in 1851. The 2.1 m high white marble angel holy water font was designed by Dublin architect Mr. O'Callaghan and presented to the cathedral in 1896. Maud Sumner's paintings of the Stations of the Cross adorn the cathedral walls and an original crucifixion painting by the Van Dyk school, presented by Emperor Napoleon III, is housed in the north-west transept.

The Prince Imperial, son of Empress Eugénie, lay in state in the cathedral after being killed in Rorkes Drift in 1879.

== The Cathedral today ==
The Cathedral is the episcopal seat or cathedra of the Archbishop of Cape Town, Sithembele Sipuka.

There are regular services in the Cathedral including Mass and solemn Vespers, and Benediction. A Zimbabwean Mass in Shona also takes place on the first Sunday of each month in the Cathedral Hall.

== Gallery ==
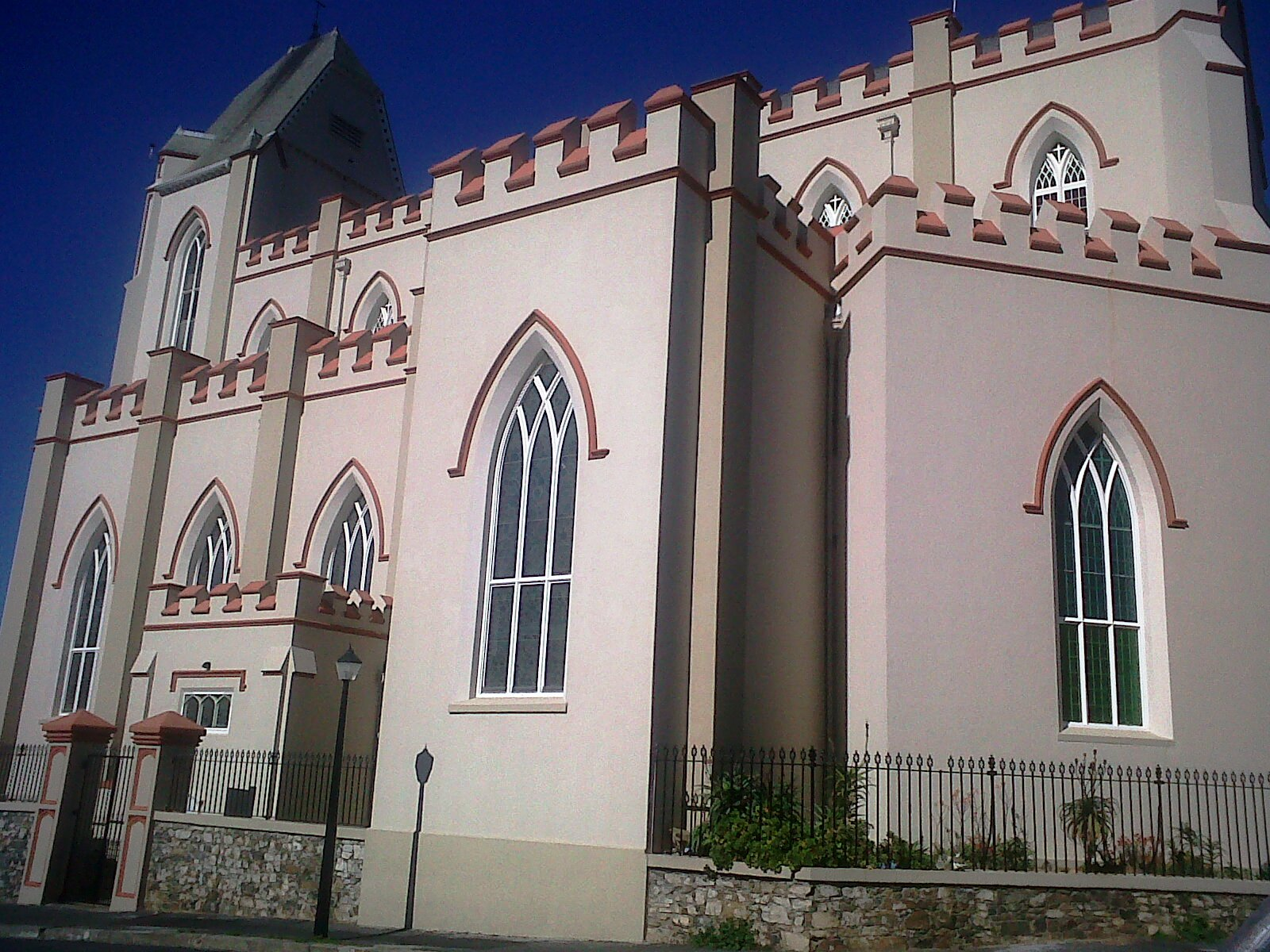
Side view

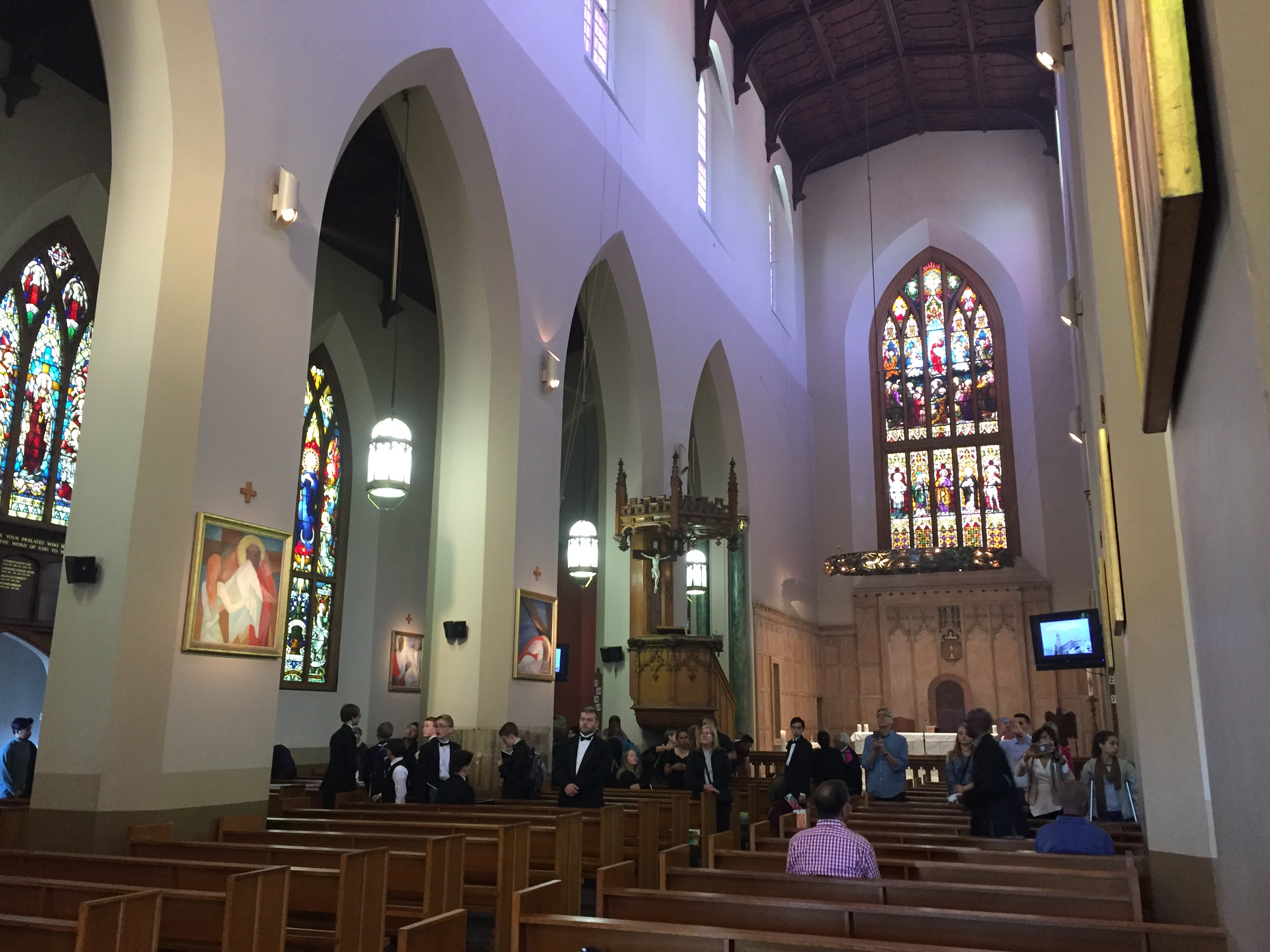
Interior
