= Somerset-East Reformed Church (NGK) =

Church in the Eastern Cape

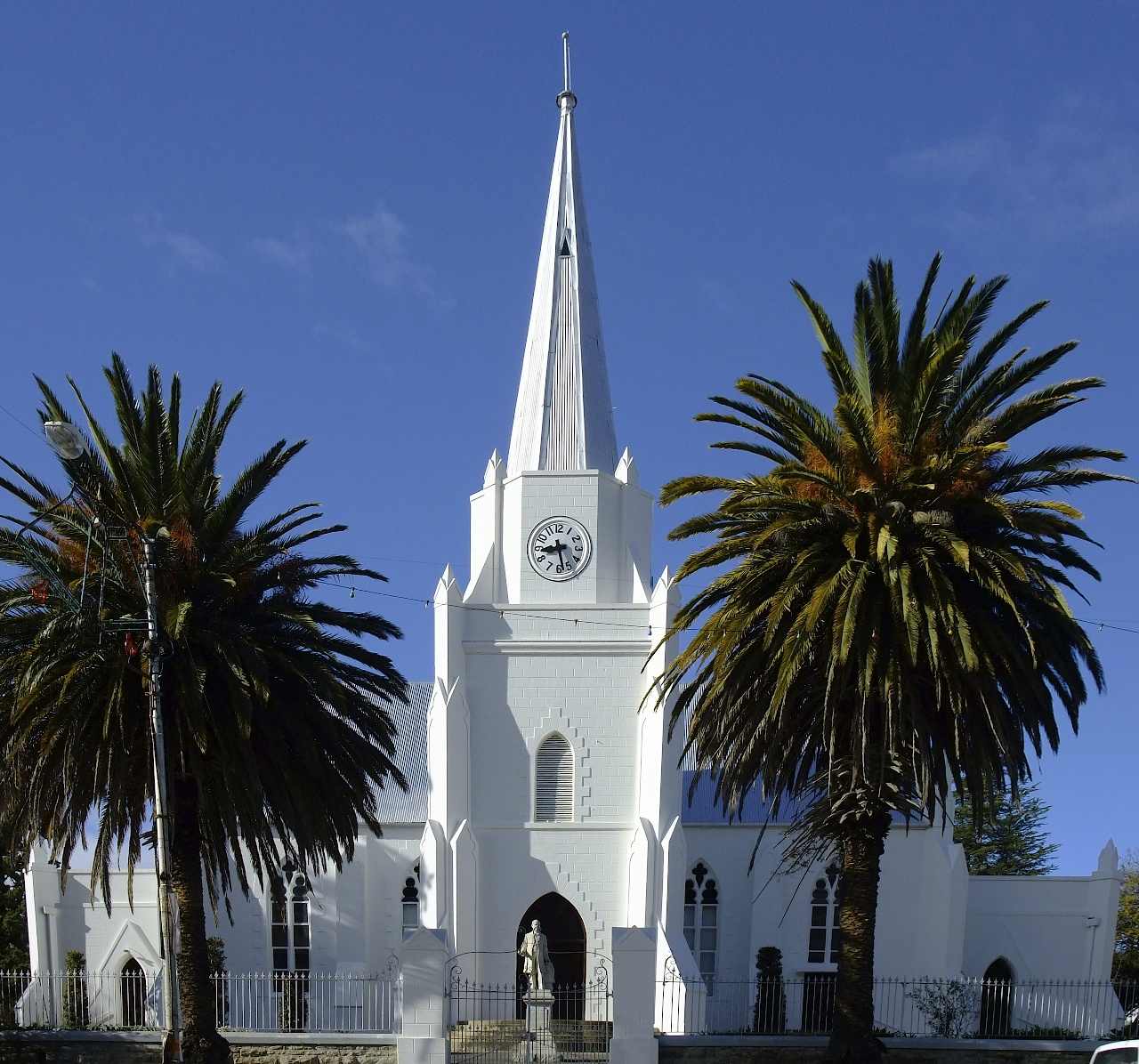
The church in 2012.

The Somerset-East Reformed Church is the fourth oldest congregation of the Dutch Reformed Church in South Africa (NGK) in the Synod of the Eastern Cape and the 15th oldest in the entire South African denomination.

== Foundation ==
Before the foundation of a separate congregation in Somerset East in 1825, the area was split between the Graaff-Reinet and the southern portion of the Uitenhage congregations. The magistrate, William MacKay, was the one who urged a separate congregation and church building. On May 27, 1825, only five months after the Governor of Cape Colony set up the drostdy ("district") Somerset East and Mackay as appointed its first magistrate, the latter wrote a letter to the Governor, Lord Charles Somerset, expounding on his plan. The answer, while as private as the original letter, had to have been encouraging, since only a month after it was received, the magistrate and heemraad gave the official go-ahead.

The Church Ordinance of 1804, promulgated by then Dutch Commissioner-General Jacob Abraham de Mist and in effect until an 1843 Ordinance superseded it, gave the power to a public body to establish congregations in outlying districts on the government's behalf. At a meeting held in the Somerset Drostdy on July 9, 1825, it was decided to petition the governor to establish a church in the town. Since the Governor couldn't act on his own, he sought permission from Count Henry Bathurst, 3rd Earl Bathurst, the Secretary of State for War and the Colonies, but the latter reported that there was not enough money in the colonial coffers to support a church being built.

== First pastor and church council ==
Permission was nevertheless granted to establish a separate congregation, and in October 1825, the Rev. George Morgan, one of the first six Presbyterian preachers from Scotland to come to the Cape to address its shortage of Afrikaner pastors and to help Anglicize the Boers, appointed a church council including the elders Robert Hart (also one of Somerset-East's first three heemraad) and F.J. van Aardt and the deacons Gideon Jordaan, Michael Bosch, Willem Prinsloo, and P.M. Bester. The first verger was Hendrik Waldeck, who lived on a salary of R25, "in addition to the various tithes and incomes he made presiding over baptism and weddings." "Fortunately, in those days people often married and had many children," wrote the Rev. Andries Dreyer in Gedenkboek van die Nederduits-Gereformeerde Kerk Somerset Oos ("Commemorative Book of the Somerset-East NGK Church"), "since his salary was nary a trifle."

The first lay reader was George Aldrich, who earned a somewhat higher salary than the verger. He soon resigned, though, and until his later reappointment was replaced by the townsman P.B. Botha. Botha couldn't be appointed permanently because this was a government post and he didn't speak English. A later reader was C. Muller. The reader's duty was to lead the liturgy, read the 10 Commandments, and sing hymns before the pulpit, since there were no musical instruments in the church at this time.

The congregation was overextended from its foundation. It included the districts of Bruintjes Hoogte, Zwagershoek, Baviaans Rivier, Oost-Rietrivier, and Boschjesmans Rivier. There was no official membership census, but an 1838 poll tallied 2,633 of them. The district had a large black population, and in 1825, hundreds of them settled in the district. They lived in poverty and worked for the farmers. Although slavery was still legal in the colony and there were slave owners in the district, it was forbidden to own black slaves. Conflicts arose between the groups, and in 1835 the church record notes "that brother Carel Mattheus was treacherously murdered in his home by an enemy gang." In the journal entry from April 16, 1835, the following is said of the matter: "With great sorrow and regret, we use these meeting minutes to preserve the memory of a reputable fellow whose humble and helpful life works were decorated by much Christian virtue."

== First church building ==
The congregation may have enlisted a pastor during its first year of operation, but it would be very long before it could secure its own church building. The magistrate had a good plan and the governor submitted and even sketched a plot of the building, but Count Bathurst continued to assert there were insufficient funds for the project.

Meanwhile, the congregation worshiped in one of the old government buildings on Somerset Farm. Somerset Farm was a gentleman's farm built by Lord Somerset in 1815, both to supply local colonial troops and to grow tobacco for export. It lay on a strip of land at the foot of the beautiful Boschberg Mountains, which had been purchased by the Governor Joachim van Plettenberg from its first owner, the aforementioned Willem Prinsloo.

Later, Somerset Farm was divided into two tenant farms for two farmers, Louis Trichardt and Mr. Bester. In 1833, Trichardt was the first Voortrekker to risk leaving the boundaries of the Colony. His tobacco farming was so successful that it came to the attention of the Governor, who then expropriated it for R200 (£165). The Governor hired a talented botanist, Dr. Mackrill, but tobacco cultivation was a failure under them. As sustenance for the troops, however, the farm was a success, especially under Robert Hart, Mackrill's successor since 1817. Granaries were built and cattle raised for export when needed.

The foundation developed as a store as well as a gentleman farm. Many people of all races were employed there, and in 1821, the Rev. William Shaw of the Wesleyan Church began preaching there; later, he would build a church there, continued by the missionary Revs. Stephen Kay and John Ayliff. This church was eventually transformed into a parsonage for the NGK church.

Later, the Governor granted permission to the congregation to worship in the old Drostdy. Apparently, the congregation was under the misconception that they would gain special treatment from Lord Somerset as the town's namesake. They constantly hounded him and his council for advice given that the church was a State Church and nothing could be done without their permission. The low treasury excuse continued to be used, however. The church council itself sought donations from the Colonial Secretary, Governor, Lieutenant Governor, and other high-ranking officials, but the record shows no contributions from them. Therefore, the congregation learned that they had to help themselves.

Donation lists were then sent out to the people in the district in 1826. The congregation accepted cattle from those in the district who could not contribute money. With great difficulty, the list was returned two years later with a total of £560. The Lieutenant-Governor, Sir Richard Bourke, visited the town in September, and at this time the pastor Mr. Morgan and the elder Hart requested a piece of land for the church. After an inspection, he stood on a beautiful piece of land at the southern end of Beaufort Street.

It would be a long time before construction began, however, since in August 1828, the Governor replied to the church council's letter claiming the proposed building was too large and expensive and asking for a 300-seat church. The council unanimously declared this seating inadequate, since the house they were using already seated over 300 for a congregation of 5,698, and communion services were so overcrowded that some had to be turned away and others didn't even show up. The Governor at last conceded to the architect Shinnon's plan to provide 600 pews.

In 1829, the work on the new church still hadn't started and the temporary one was falling into disrepair, the Graaff-Reinet Ring sent a notice to the Governor asking to use the old Drostdy as a place of worship. The Governor approved the request, and on his arrival that September, the Rev. Morgan and elder Hart reiterated the need for a dedicated building. They later reported back to the Council that the Governor would be willing to grant a £700 loan to the congregation and convey their requests to London.

The request was granted, and therefore the congregation, using the loan and member contributions, began building. First on September 6, 1830, the blueprint was approved by the church with a 75 x 40 ft interior (23 x 12 m, or 276 m^{2}), 20 f (6 m) height, and 2.5-ft (0.75-m) thick walls. The tower was to be 16 x 16 ft (4.89 x 4.89 m) in area. A door and four windows would be furnished each on the front and back sides. The masonry foreman was a Mr. Sandilands from Graaff-Reinet and H. Waldeck was contracted for R25 to haul 800 ft (244 m) of board from Kowie Bos. Bandits were dragooned to help with construction.

== Keystone laid ==
The keystone was finally laid on December 25, 1830. The date the church was consecrated is lost, but it eventually was though with great difficulty, given that notes of the church council meeting on September 2, 1833, have elder Hart asked why construction progress was going so slowly. A David McMaster was contracted to build the pews, but they were still unfinished by July 1837, when the council threatened him with a fine. It was decided that each member would pay for their own pew once the money charged to McMaster was exhausted. The pews were divided into three classes from front to back of the church. The most expensive cost R3/yr, the middle ones R2.5/yr, and the cheapest in the back R2. The donation drive was aimed toward an opening on January 1, 1834. In the early years, two services were held each Sunday, one in Dutch and on in English, until around 1846, when the St. Andrew's Uniting Presbyterian Church opened in town and English-language services at the NGK church were discontinued.

== First three pastors ==
Somerset-East's first pastor was the Rev. Morgan. He left for a post in the Reformed Presbyterian Church in Southern Africa in Cape Town in 1841, and he was succeeded by the Rev. John Pears, invested on October 24 of that year. After Pears died in the parsonage, the Rev. Jan Hendrik Hofmeyr (minister), who served from 1867 to 1908. Hofmeyr married a daughter of the Rev. Andrew Murray, and just like Ms. Hofmeyr's parents they had five sons who all became pastors. One of the sons, John Murray Hofmeyr, was curate from 1907 and succeeded his father as pastor from the latter's death the following year until 1940. Thus, in its first 115 years in existence, the congregation had only four pastors.

== The Rev. Jan Hofmeyr's tenure ==
The Rev. Hofmeyr and his family arrived on Thursday, March 28, 1867, in Somerset East. In the local Courant that day, the following was written on the heartfelt reception they received there:

A long and cherished dream of the Dutch congregation is finally fulfilled here by the arrival of their pastor, the Rev. J. H. Hofmeyr. The high esteem in which his parishioners in Murraysburg, and the sadness tempered with cordial well-wishes expressed by same, betray the loss of a friend and spiritual guide in him that will be difficult to replace. On Thursday morning, the 28th, a large community delegation which would have been much greater if the arrival time had been known, came to meet him in Somerset East.

The welcome and greetings were very warm. The Rev. was accompanied by the whole congregation to town and at the parsonage, up the steps where a group of young women, fellow congregation members, waited to sing him home with appropriate hymns. He was then offered and read aloud numerous signed blessings welcoming him, expressing the signers' gratitude to God for his arrival after so much hoping and waiting, and wishing him and his family good fortune among them. They were convinced that it cost him dearly to leave his beloved Murraysburg congregation and accept his calling to Somerset, so a greater force must have brought him there; thus, they trust and pray that God's hand will give him the strength and wisdom to fulfill the duties of his great mission, to further the cause of Christ and bring more into the flock of the Good Shepherd. He was further welcomed in the address by Gill College, which trusted that he would benefit the institution and offered the best wishes to Mrs. Hofmeyr and the young family.

After the address was read, the Rev. Hofmeyr thanked them for the hearty welcome and said that he hoped to follow in his predecessor's footsteps. He also hoped that his efforts would be in the spiritual and temporal interest of the congregation, and promised to do his best to support the educational institution now being founded.

Two days later, his confirmation took place. The following article, freely translated from Dutch, was written at the time by the Cape Town paper De Volksvriend:

The Rev. J.H. Hofmeyr was invested on Saturday, march 30, in Somerset East. Over the course of the week, he had arrived from Cape Town to a very congenial welcome. The parsonage, which has been significantly renovated in recent years, was not yet furnished so borrowed furniture was used for the occasion to allow at least six pastors to abide there. Friday night, the Rev. Charles Murray (from the Burgersdorp congregation) gave a long sermon.

The following morning, the Rev. Adrian Roux (from the Albanie Reformed Church) delivered the confirmation sermon on the theme of the words "The love of Christ urges us," with the Rev. Hofmeyr being confirmed by normal practice except that it was before the sermon and not after as was customary. The Rev. Murray had declined the opportunity to give the sermon, hence the Rev. Roux delivering it. That afternoon, the Rev. Hofmeyr preached for the first time to his new congregation, on the subject of Psalm 122:9: "For the sake of the house of the LORD our God, I will seek good for thee" (1933 Afrikaans translation).

The Revs. W.R. Thompson (Stockenström Reformed Church) and Georg Stegmann (Glen Lynden Reformed Church) were present for the occasion. Stegmann gave the preparation sermon in the evening. The following morning, the Rev. Thompson preached as Holy Communion was delivered. All five pastors participated therein. The Rev. Murray sermonized once again at noon, and the Rev. Hofmeyr returning in the evening. Turnout was very large, and there were too few pews to accommodate all on Sunday. As far as one can judge, in the words of De Volksvriend, all were satisfied with the preparations, though there were far fewer attendees than expected from neighboring congregations.

The report continues:

On Monday, the keystone was laid for the main building of Gill College (the building was handed over to the school on December 24, 1868). The procession started at the NGK church building. When it arrived on school grounds, Mr. Stretch gave a brief history of the institution due to be established, after which the Rev. Thompson gave the Lord's blessing to the school. Mr. Hudson then laid the stone and declared it "good and well placed." The Revs. Thompson, Hofmeyr, Murray, Solomon, and Stegmann all spoke in turn. At a "tea-meeting" that night, the Rev. Hofmeyr had the chance to make the acquaintance of his congregation in a convivial manner: "Tea was drunk - cake was eaten - the piano was played - people chatted - and "speeches" were made, heard, and enjoyed." The speakers included the Revs. Hudson, Barker, Edwards, and Solomon from the Wesleyan Church as well as the Revs. Hofmeyr, Stegmann, and Murray from the NGK.

"All went well and the most pleasant mood could be felt," according to De Volkstem.

On the subject of the Rev. Hofmeyr's work in the congregation, the Rev. Dreyer wrote that he did "his work in the congregation with optimism combined with a since sense of duty...He worked over a period of more than 41 years and was richly blessed with the delicious fruit it bore. True to the fulfillment of his preaching and pastoral work, he tasted the joy of helping build the congregation and expand God's Kingdom both within and outside the parish's borders."

He was an advocate for ecumenical conferences. Already, two years after his arrival, a meeting was held on "The Christian plight and calling in the World." In 1884, his brother-in-law, Dr. Andrew Murray, held blessed revival services in Somerset East. At a later conference in 1891, Dr. Murray again presented a paper expounding on the Epistle to the Hebrews, which was much discussed and later published under the title "Seeing Jesus."

The annual thanksgiving alms drive the Rev. Hofmeyr instituted in 1876 was another prime occasion. This taught the congregation to work together and give for the Lord's sake. At first, nothing was contributed but the Sunday collections, and the government paid the full salary (£200) that the minister earned. Only later did the church council supplement this. The Rev. Hofmeyr was one of the last pastors to earn a government salary. In 1907, with his name second on the list of attending pastors (his nephew, Prof. Nicolaas Hofmeyr was first), his congregation celebrated their memories of him in a 40th anniversary service, which he participated in with no shortage of zeal, but also "with the deepest piety of life and with true dedication to his Lord," according to Rev. Dreyer.

The Rev. Hofmeyr's full career included many baptism services, including on farms in the district, and he sometimes baptized 24 children at a time. He entered all their names, as well as the names and address of their parents and witnesses, in the Baptism Book; and the witnesses did not let him down, for with the baptism of their own children, they exceeded the record with as many as 12 witnesses. In between these things, he also had time to care for his own children and study Dutch.

== Second church building ==
One of the first tasks the Rev. Hofmeyr took on was building a church. The old church had dilapidated thatch and was simply too small. In 1869, therefore, the council decided to build a much larger church on the same land on the southern end of Beaufort Street. At the time, many towns built their churches at the end of a street to allow a clear line of sight to them. Two walls of the old building remained, but the rest was brand new and laid out by the German-born architect Carl Otto Hager. It was dedicated on November 17, 1871. The festivities began on a Thursday when the worshipers of the district began coming to town, filling the hotels to the point where local families had to board them. That day at noon, a church bazaar was held in the warehouse by a Mr. Webb to raise money for the construction fund, bringing in £73. The following day, the dedication ceremonies began in earnest. The tower was incomplete, the walls unfinished, and the paint job a work in progress, but given the long-planned day of dedication, the congregation soldiered on. In the morning, the members and other guests arrived in the hall of Gill College, where the Rev. Stegmann of Glen Lynden gave a short prayer. The entire "procession" (as the article in Volksblad called the march) proceeded to the church where the Rev. Hofmeyr opened the doors in the Name of the Triune God. The choir sang an "inaugural anthem" composed by a local amateur, after which the pastor's brother-in-law the Rev. Charles Murray preached a sermon on 2 Chronicles 7:12: "And the LORD appeared unto Solomon by night, and He said to him: I have heard your prayer, and I have chosen this Temple as the place for making sacrifices." The choir sang a few songs during the morning service.

In the afternoon, the Rev. Abraham Isaac Steytler from Uitenhage preached to a large crowd. On Saturday morning, Rev. Roux of Riebeek-East gave a serious preparation speech, and at noon, the Rev. Stegmann preached to the children. On Sunday, the dedication weekend culminated in Holy Communion, in which the Revs. Roux, Murray, Du Plessis, Muller, Steytler, Stegmann, and Hofmeyr all participated. Including the bazaar, the weekend's events raised almost £600, £40 more than the 1828 list had in two years. Mr. Hagar, the contractor, was given fulsome praise for his workmanship and £100 in compensation. On Monday, a picnic was held for the Sunday school children, to which children from other denominations were also invited. The Volksblad reported: "On Tuesday, it was as quiet as usual in the village."

== The Rev. John Hofmeyr's tenure ==
In 1903, the Rev. John Hofmeyr was appointed curate by his father. The appointment was only for a year as it was hoped that he would return to missionary field upon recovery from an illness. The curate continued in the position for three years, however, and when in 1907 the congregation needed another pastor given changing conditions and the health of the elder Rev. Hofmeyr, John was offered the post. He took the job and was invested on October 19, 1907. There was no report on the confirmation in the Kerkbode. Given the great privilege of working with his father, the Rev. John became the sole pastor on Jan's death the following year.

On the occasion of the congregation's celebrating its 110th birthday, the Rev. Dreyer wrote:

He has ministered to the congregation for over thirty years and does so in a manner that brings joy and gratitude to them. While nothing sensational happened during his tenure, he will go into silence with his work continued by his faithful evangelizing and pastoral visits, and has obviously been blessed. Under his aegis, an orphanage cares for 200 children and a poorhouse operates in conjunction with the church council. And in 1931, the church was renovated at a cost of more than £3,000 and thereby heavily improved. Thanks to the example of the Hofmeyr family and the inspiration they provided, Somerset East remains a missionary church.

== Membership figures ==
Somerset-East's number of professing NGK members was always somewhere near the middle of the rankings of large rural villages in the Eastern Cape. The following table shows the overall decrease in membership in the inland portion of the province. In cases where congregations merged, their numbers are combined throughout. These include Middelburg and Middelburg-View; Grahamstown, Grahamstown-Border, and Albanie; Somerset-East and Cookhouse; and Queenstown, Queenstown-East, and Queenstown-North (the latter two combined for a while as Queenstown-Gardens). Each town's peak membership is indicated in bold. This shows that Graaff-Reinet, Cradock, Queenstown, and Aliwal North peaked in the mid-20th century and that Burgersdorp's membership declined after 1933. The congregations from Aliwal North, Cradock, Grahamstown, and Queenstown all included more members in 2014 than around a century earlier.

Congregation/Town	1916	1933	1952	1960	1973	1979	1985	1990	1995	2000	2005	2010	2012	2014	2015	2016
Aliwal North	750	950	1145	1150	1250	1338	1242	1300	**1595**	1593	1378	1117	1114	1131	1043	1043
Burgersdorp	1100	**1461**	1274	1260	1008	937	945	941	850	710	677	605	573	539	517	507
Cradock	1878	2164	2858	**2914**	2399	2421	2464	2288	2024	1934	1931	1697	1662	1892	1894	1575
Graaff-Reinet	2125	2211	2536	**2573**	2115	2055	1917	1758	1699	1657	1242	1347	1077	1088	1075	1130
Grahamstown/Albanie	576	860	**1640**	1341	1479	1289	1115	1105	1122	1090	836	794	751	727	620	620
Middelburg	1100	1307	**1430**	Unknown	1372	1391	1158	992	1147	970	953	829	829	702	648	592
Queenstown	566	1195	2060	**2153**	2115	1966	1866	1779	1572	1337	1190	1045	876	876	876	663
**Somerset East**	1652	1400	1800	**1864**	1657	1511	1246	1210	1201	1281	1122	917	959	967	967	958
Total	9747	11548	**14743**	14655	13395	12908	11953	11373	11210	10572	9329	8351	7841	7922	7640	7088

The joint membership numbers of the churches reached a high point of 14,743 by 1952, but had returned to 11,373 by 1995, less than the 1933 total of 11,548. Between 1990 and 2000, the total decreased from 11,373 to 10,572, but in the next 15 years, the decline accelerated as the congregations lost 2,932 members to reach a total of 7,641, amounting to a loss of more than a quarter of members.

== Select pastors ==
- George Morgan, 1826–1841, later with the Scottish congregation in Kaapstad (probably the Presbyterian congregation of St. Andrew's)
- John Pears, 1841 – June 18, 1866 (died in office)
- Jan Hendrik Hofmeyr, 1867 to August 25, 1908 (died in office)
- John Murray Hofmeyr, 1907–1940 (emeritus; died December 15, 1943)
- Izak Jacob Viljoen, 1940–1956
- Johannes Hermanus Frier, 1944–1946
- Gabriël Jacobus Lotter, 1947–1963
- Hendrik Johannes de Vos, 1956–1965
- Stephanus Johannes Hofmeyr van der Spuy, 1964 – November 18, 1969 (retirement from the ministry)
- Hercules Philippus Malan, 1966–1970
- Nikolaas Jacobus du Toit, March 14, 1970 – 1974
- Heinrich Franz Heymann, January 23, 1971 – April 1976
- Carel Aaron Anthonissen, 1975–1979 (also a missionary)
- Johannes Jochemus Eucharistius Koornhof, 1976–1981
- Barend Hermanus Smit, 1980 – 23 Julie 1987 (resignation, further studies)
- André Schmidt, 1982–1987
- Jan Frederick Marais, 1987–1991
- Petrus Jacobus Naudé, 1990–1992
- Dr. Adriaan Ferreira van der Merwe, 1991–2002
- Petrus Johannes Bester, 1992–2002
- Hermanus Venter (Herman) Burger, 1992–1999
- Dr. Izak Johannes van der Merwe, 1995–2000
- Christoffel Johannes (Chris) du Raan, 2002 – present
- Ferdinand Pieter (Ferdi) Louw, 2004–2008
- Deon André Els, 2010 – February 7, 2016 (later with the Kraggakamma Reformed Church in Port Elizabeth)
- Johan Orsmond, January 22, 2017 – present

== Cultural Heritage ==
The second church building was declared a national heritage site on October 12, 1979, by Teunis Nicolaas Hendrik Jansonm, the Minister of Education and continues to function as a provincial heritage site under the terms of the National Heritage Resources Act (25/1999).

== Sources ==
- Dreyer, the Rev. A. 1935. Gedenkboek van die Nederduits-Gereformeerde Kerk Somerset Oos. Cape Town: Cape Times Beperk.
- Olivier, the Rev. P.L. (samesteller). Ons gemeentelike feesalbum. Cape Town/Pretoria: N.G. Kerk-uitgewers, 1952.
- (af) Hofmeyr, W. Lou(w); Hofmeyr, Nico J.; Hofmeyr, S.M.; Hofmeyr, George S.; Hofmeyr, Johannes W. (compilers). 1987. Die Hofmeyrs: 'n Familiegeskiedenis. Lynnwood Ridge/Bloemfontein: Die Samestellers.
