= Blue Crane Route Local Municipality =

Blue Crane Route Bloukraanroete
- Local municipality
- Seal

- Location in the Eastern Cape
- Coordinates: 32°43′S 25°35′E
- Country: South Africa
- Province: Eastern Cape
- District: Sarah Baartman
- Seat: Somerset East
- Wards: 6

Government
  - Type: Municipal council
  - Mayor: (ANC)

Area
  - Total: 11,068 km^{2} (4,273 sq mi)

Population (2011)
  - Total: 36,002
  - Density: 3.2528/km^{2} (8.4247/sq mi)

Racial makeup (2011)
  - Black African: 46.0%
  - Coloured: 33.0%
  - Indian/Asian: 0.3%
  - White: 19.8%

First languages (2011)
  - Xhosa: 51.3%
  - Afrikaans: 43.2%
  - English: 3.4%
  - Other: 2.1%
- Time zone: UTC+2 (SAST)
- Municipal code: EC102

Blue Crane Route Municipality (Xhosa: uMasipala wase Blue Crane Route; Afrikaans: Bloukraanroete Munisipaliteit) is a local municipality within the Sarah Baartman District Municipality, in the Eastern Cape of South Africa. The municipality is named after the South African national bird, the blue crane.

== Main places ==
The 2001 census divided the municipality into the following main places:

| Place | Code | Population | Most spoken language |
|---|---|---|---|
| Bongweni | 20202 | 3,776 | Xhosa |
| Cookhouse | 20203 | 1,415 | Xhosa |
| Khayanisho | 20204 | 1,448 | Xhosa |
| KwaNojoli | 20205 | 8,132 | Xhosa |
| Pearston | 20206 | 2,596 | Afrikaans |
| Petersburg | 29103 | 39 | Afrikaans |
| Somerset East | 20207 | 8,456 | Xhosa |
| Remainder of the municipality | 20201 | 9,196 | Xhosa |

== Politics ==
The municipal council consists of eleven members elected by mixed-member proportional representation. Six councillors are elected by first-past-the-post voting in six wards, while the remaining five are chosen from party lists so that the total number of party representatives is proportional to the number of votes received.

In the election of 4 November 2026 the African National Congress (ANC) lost its majority, but won a plurality of five seats.

The following table shows the results of the election.

| Party | Ward | | | List | | | Total seats |
| Party | Votes | % | Seats | Votes | % | Seats | Total seats |
|---|---|---|---|---|---|---|---|
| African National Congress | 4,576 | 44.95 | 2 | 4,635 | 45.55 | 3 | 5 |
| Democratic Alliance | 3,830 | 37.62 | 4 | 3,812 | 37.46 | 0 | 4 |
| Patriotic Alliance | 1,209 | 11.88 | 0 | 1,196 | 11.75 | 1 | 1 |
| Economic Freedom Fighters | 293 | 2.88 | 0 | 286 | 2.81 | 1 | 1 |
| Independent candidates | 63 | 0.62 | 0 | | | | 0 |
| 5 other parties | 210 | 2.06 | 0 | 247 | 2.43 | 0 | 0 |
| Total | 10,181 | 100.00 | 6 | 10,176 | 100.00 | 5 | 11 |
| Valid votes | 10,181 | 98.90 | | 10,176 | 98.93 | | |
| Invalid/blank votes | 113 | 1.10 | | 110 | 1.07 | | |
| Total votes | 10,294 | 100.00 | | 10,286 | 100.00 | | |
| Registered voters/turnout | 19,333 | 53.25 | | 19,333 | 53.20 | | |
