= Stalplein =

Public square in Cape Town, South Africa

Coordinates: 33°55′37.2″S 18°25′4″E

Stalplein lies at the point where Plein, Roeland, and St. John's Streets meet in Cape Town, South Africa. Plein and Parliament Streets run southwest to Stalplein. The greater part of the square is no longer publicly accessible, since it is now confined within the grounds of the Houses of Parliament.

The square features the Tuynhuys, a statue of Louis Botha, a bust of Nelson Mandela, St. Mary's Cathedral, and the De Goede Hoop Masonic Temple.

In 1705, Governor Willem Adriaan van der Stel of the Dutch East India Company ordered stables built for the company in what was then known as Looyersplein (Afrikaans: Tanner's Square), thereby renaming it Stalplein from the Dutch for "Stable Square." The stables went into such disrepair that they were demolished 86 years later. The area east of the Tuynhuys was henceforward used as a town square. On May 31, 1986, Stalplein was redeveloped with a memorial garden and monument dedicated to South African soldiers. Botha's statue was moved at this time. The Mandela sculpture was unveiled on April 28, 2014.
