= Somerset East =

- KwaNojoli
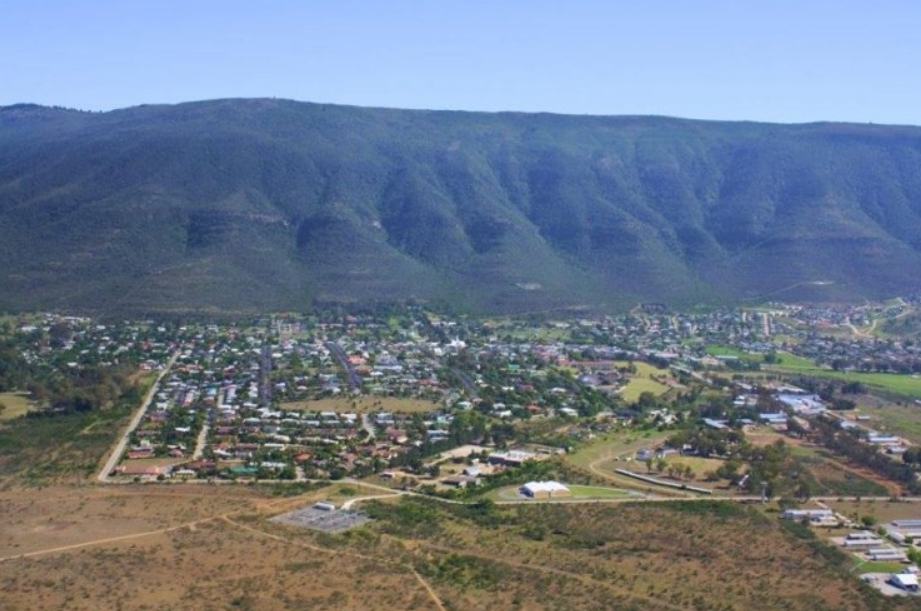
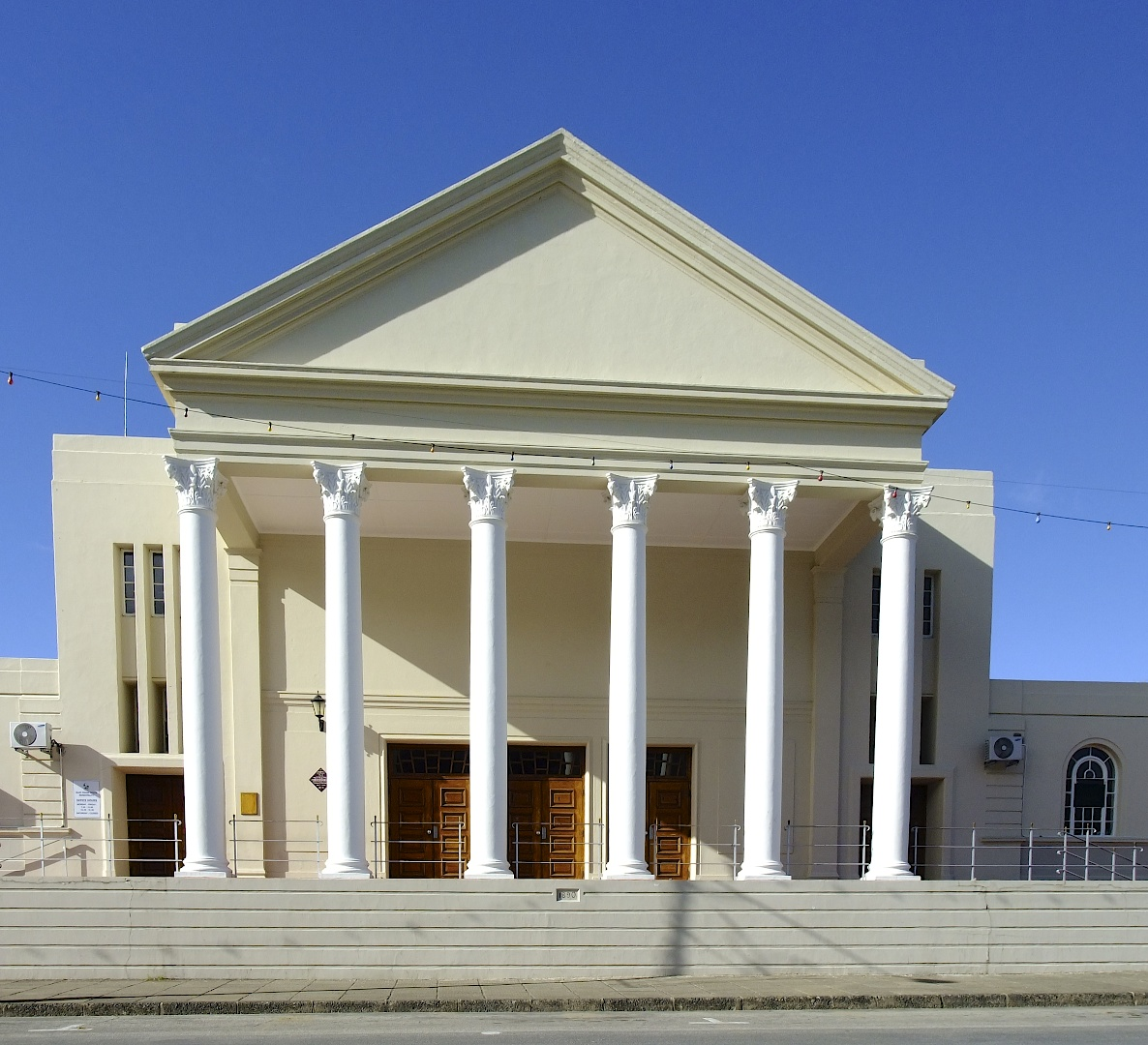
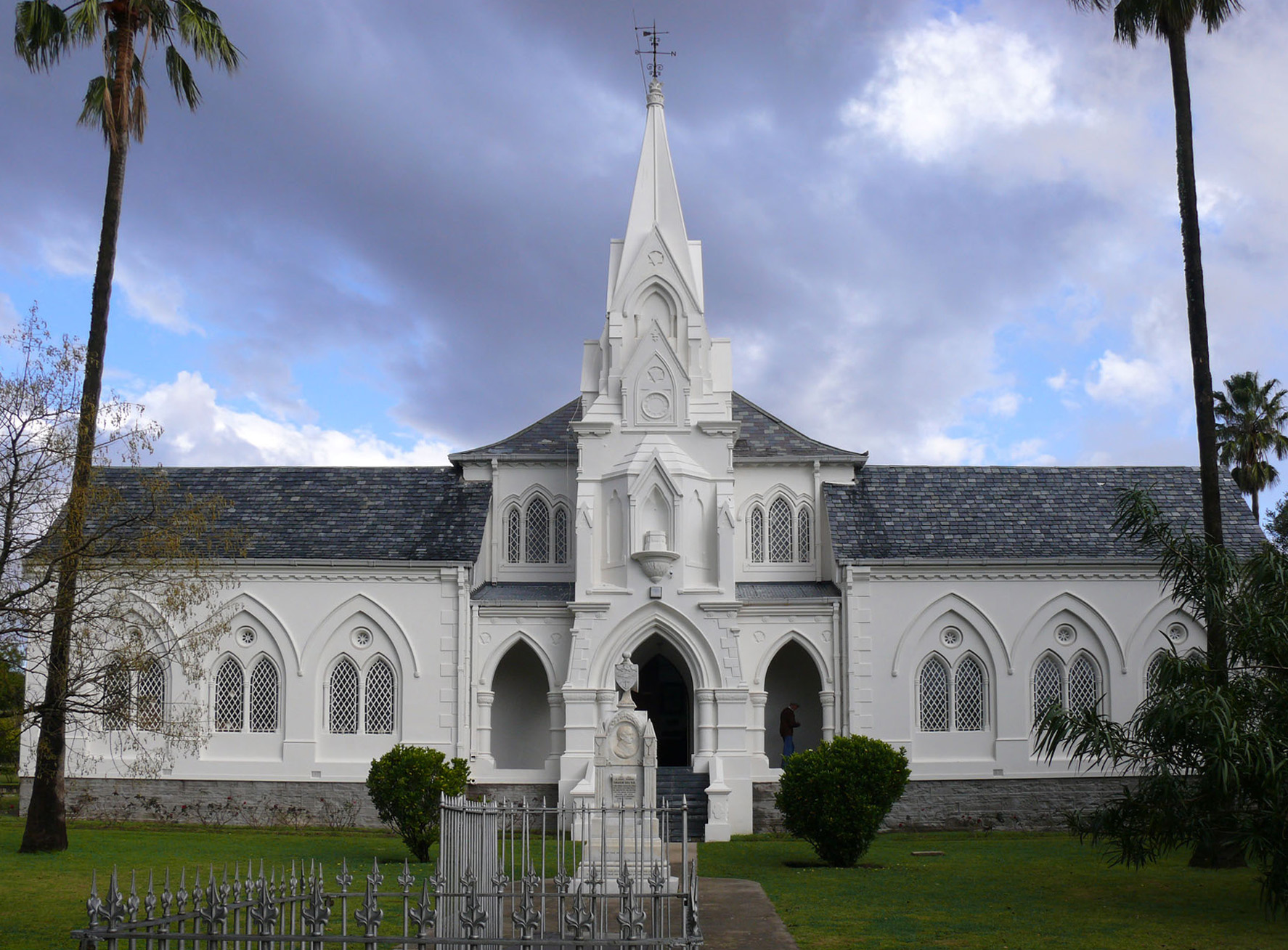
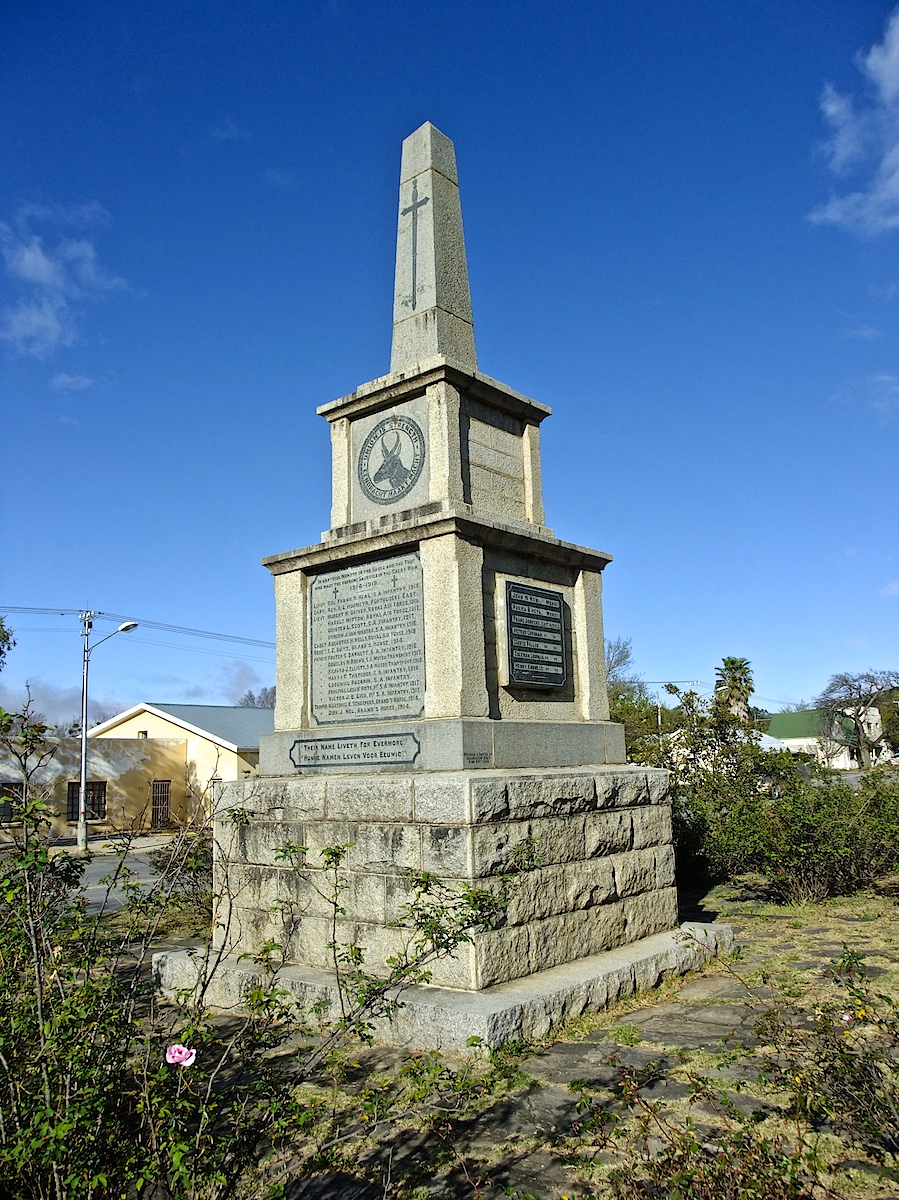
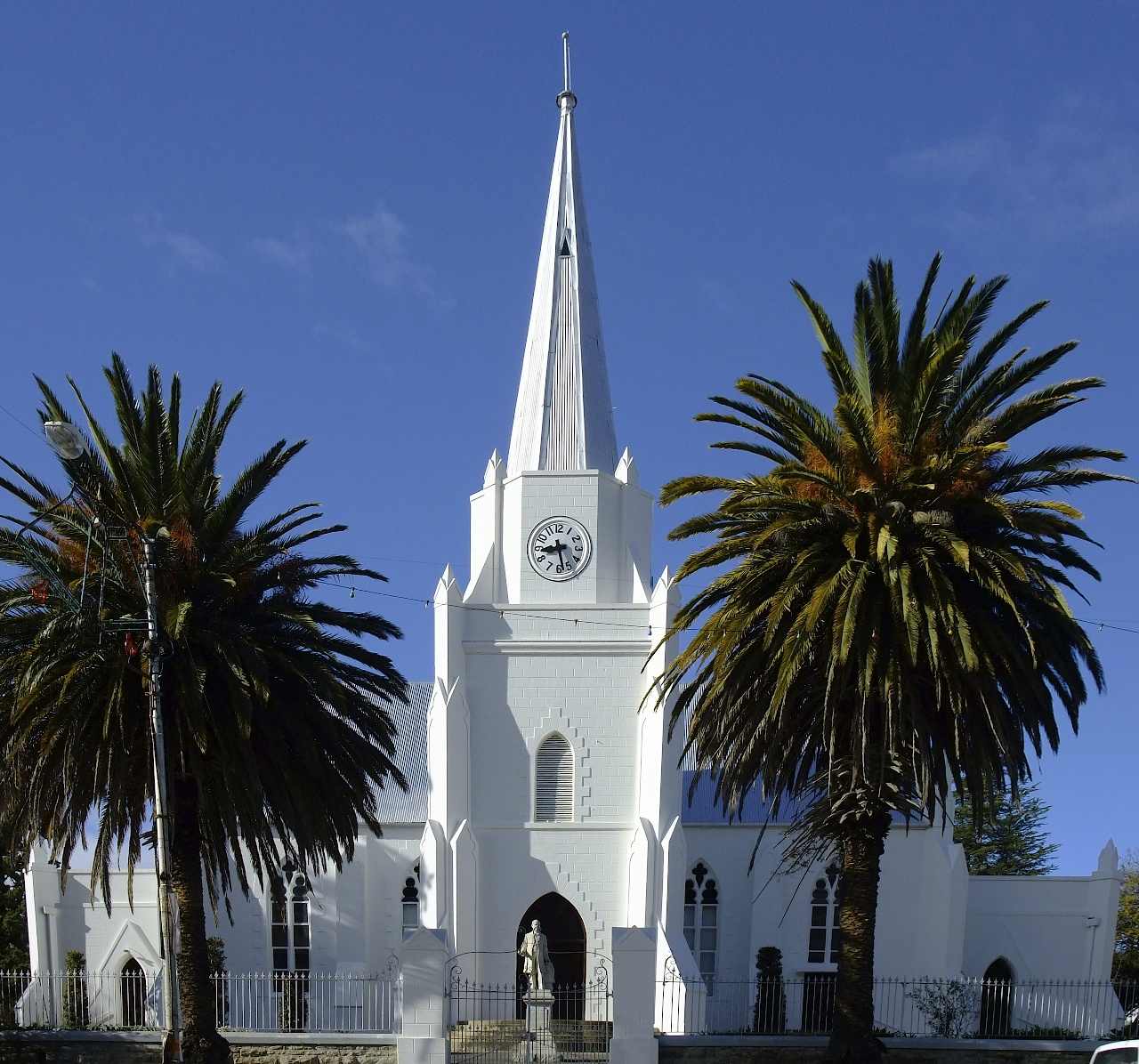
- From top: Somerset East at the foot of the Bosberg Mountains, left: Town Hall, right: Gill College, left: War Memorial, right: Somerset-East Reformed Church (NGK)

- Location within Eastern Cape Location within South Africa Location within Africa
- Coordinates: 32°43′S 25°35′E
- Country: South Africa
- Province: Eastern Cape
- District: Sarah Baartman
- Municipality: Blue Crane Route
- Established: 1825; 201 years ago

Government
  - Councillors: Archer Heynse (DA); Lorraine Smith-Johnson (DA); Ayanda Dyantyi (ANC)

Area
  - Total: 72.8 km^{2} (28.1 sq mi)
- Elevation: 750 m (2,460 ft)

Population (2011)
  - Total: 18,825
  - Density: 259/km^{2} (670/sq mi)

Racial makeup (2011)
  - Black African: 48%
  - Coloured: 32%
  - Indian/Asian: 0.4%
  - White: 20%
  - Other: 0.5%

First languages (2011)
  - Xhosa: 51.8%
  - Afrikaans: 42.9%
  - English: 3.7%
  - Other: 1.6%
- Time zone: UTC+2 (SAST)
- Postal code (street): 5850
- PO box: 5850

Somerset East, officially KwaNojoli since 2023, is a small historic town in the Blue Crane Route Local Municipality in the Eastern Cape, South Africa. It was founded by Lord Charles Somerset in 1825.

The town, at the foot of the Boschberg Mountains (Xhosa: Intaba kaNojoli), is known for its natural environment and for its provincial heritage sites and buildings. The forested, mountainous backdrop frames the town, with a number of hiking trails in the wooded Boschberg Nature Reserve. The malaria-free area is a bird-watching destination, with other outdoor activities including trout fishing, safari and hunting trips. The Somerset East Golf Club, one of the oldest in the country, was formally opened in 1897. The 9-hole course is located at the foot of the mountain. The Glen Avon Falls Natural Heritage Site hosts one of South Africa's highest private waterfalls.

Notable buildings and monuments in the town include the Old Wesleyan Chapel, which houses the Somerset East Museum, and the Officers' Mess, which houses the largest permanent exhibition of paintings by the South African artist Walter Battiss. The Dutch Reformed Church congregation is the fourth oldest in the Eastern Cape. The Somerset East War Memorial is located at the western entrance to the town.

Annual events include the Biltong Festival, the Bruintjieshoogte Marathon, the Bruintjieshoogte Cycle Fest, the Walter Battiss Art Festival, as well as the Somerset East Agricultural show.

== History ==
=== Pre-colonial ===
The region encompassing modern KwaNojoli was inhabited by Khoisan hunter-gatherers for millennia before the arrival of Bantu-speaking peoples, including the Xhosa people, around the 15th century. The area's fertile valleys and proximity to the Great Fish River made it a vital corridor for migration and trade. Documented Xhosa oral histories, describe the land as part of the broader AmaXhosa territory, with clans like the Ngqika utilizing the Boschberg slopes for grazing and spiritual practices.

European explorers, including Swedish botanist Anders Sparrman in the late 1770s and British naturalist William Burchell in the early 1810s, noted the region's abundant wildlife, diverse flora, and established indigenous communities in their journals, highlighting a landscape teeming with antelope, birds, and endemic plants. French ornithologist Francois Levaillant collected bird specimens in the area in 1781 - 1782, where he discovered and named the Red-chested cuckoo, the "Piet-my-vrou".

The Boschberg area, encountered by Dutch explorers as early as 1711 and named for its dense bush vegetation, served as a natural boundary and resource hub for local Xhosa groups. Conflicts over land use foreshadowed later colonial tensions, as Trekboers began encroaching from the west in the mid-18th century.

=== The Cape of Good Hope under Dutch East India Company rule ===
European settlement in the region began in earnest during the late 18th century amid the Cape Colony's eastward expansion. In 1775 the Dutch governor of the Cape Colony, Baron Joachim van Plettenberg, and his Council of Policy in Cape Town defined the new eastern Cape Colony. It drew a line from the soon-to-be-established towns of Cradock and Somerset, forming a triangle towards the Bushman's River in the south to the sea. In the previous year the Governor had granted settlement rights in the vicinity of Bruintjieshoogte to the Sneeuwbergen Boers, like Willem Prinsloo and his family, who established a farm in Agter Bruintjies Hoogte under the Boschberg. Van Plettenberg formally established the Great Fish River in 1778 as the border between the Cape Colony and Xhosaland.

By the mid-1770s at least 20 Dutch-speaking families had joined Prinsloo. They petitioned Cape authorities for a district outpost and church - requests that contributed in 1786 to the founding of nearby Graaff-Reinet. Prinsloo's farm, spanning much of the modern townsite, was subdivided for settlers. Jakobus Otto moved into the corner now known as Bestershoek, farming wheat, livestock, and tobacco. He was followed by the future Voortrekker leader Louis Trichardt and Bester families.

=== Cape Colony under the Second British Occupation ===
The early 19th century brought intensified British influence following the Cape's second occupation in 1806. The 1811–1812 Fourth Xhosa War marked a brutal escalation in the Cape Colony's expansionist policies against the indigeneous people. This conflict, the first major engagement under direct British rule after their 1806 occupation of the Cape, resulted in the forcible expulsion of approximately 20 000 Xhosa and allied Khoekhoe from the Zuurveld, a fertile neutral buffer zone between the Sundays River and the Great Fish River, spanning modern-day Eastern Cape districts like Albany and Bathurst. By mid-1812, the Zuurveld was "cleared" and fortified with blockhouses and a military line along the Fish River. It was renamed the "Cape Eastern Frontier." This paved the way for the 1820 British Settler influx, who occupied the depopulated lands as a buffer against future Xhosa incursions.

Lord Charles Somerset, Governor of the Cape Colony, envisioned frontier settlements to secure the border against Xhosa incursions and support military logistics. Under the management of American botanist Dr. Joseph Mackrill, and selected from sites including the Gamtoos and Swartkops Valleys, "Somerset Farm" was established in 1815 at the foot of the Boschberg. It was an experimental farm to breed superior livestock, cultivate export crops like tobacco, and supply troops with grain and fodder. Subsidized infrastructure, including soldiers' barracks and a water mill, was constructed, transforming the site into a semi-military outpost. Under Captain Robert Hart, who replaced Mackrill in 1817, the farm prospered as a refreshment station, procuring local produce for distribution.

By 1825 the project was faltering due to administrative shifts, and provisions were cheaper and easier to buy elsewhere. After the Somerset Farm was subdivided and sold at auction, Robert Hart moved onto land he had been gifted by Lord Somerset for his roles in the Zuurveld clearances and the management of Somerset Farm, and named his farm Glen Avon.

In January 1825, the Sub-Drostdy of Cradock was dissolved, and a new Drostdy (magistrate's district) named Somerset was proclaimed, stretching from the Orange River north to the Zuurberg south, and from the Sundays River west to the Koonap east. William Mackay was appointed the first magistrate on 31 January 1825, formalizing the town's layout along the Little Fish River. The "East" suffix was added around 1855 to distinguish it from Somerset West in the Western Cape.

The Slachter's Nek Rebellion of 1815–1816 was a pivotal frontier uprising. Led by Hendrik Prinsloo, son of Marthinus Prinsloo, dispossessed Boers protested land seizures and stock thefts amid Xhosa-British skirmishes. Five rebels were executed by hanging from a beam (now displayed in the local museum) after a botched gallows collapse—symbolizing colonial overreach and fueling Afrikaner grievances. The event strained relations between settlers, authorities, and indigenous groups.

The mid-19th century saw Somerset East emerge as a bustling frontier hub, fueled by the wool boom and the arrival of the 1820 Settlers. Positioned on routes to the interior, it became a vital stopover for wagons bound for Graaff-Reinet and beyond. Industries flourished: wool trading dominated, supplemented by tanning, wagon-making, brickworks, and milling.

The town expanded with civic institutions. The Dutch Reformed Church congregation, the Eastern Cape's fourth oldest, was formalized in the 1830s, while the Old Wesleyan Chapel (1821), Anglican Church (1836) and British Officers' Mess (now the Walter Battiss Art Museum) reflected dual Anglo-Dutch influences. The first government school in the town was opened in 1842, and many of the early teachers and trustees were 1820 descendants. Gill College, a university college, opened in 1869. A municipality was established in 1884.

The Xhosa Wars (1779–1879), particularly the Sixth (1834–1836) and Eighth (1850–1853), directly impacted the district. Xhosa resistance to land dispossession led to raids and reprisals, with Somerset East serving as a British supply depot. Post-war, the area stabilized, but at the cost of Xhosa displacement, exacerbating racial divides.

The early 20th century brought infrastructural advances. The railway reached Somerset East in 1902, linking it to Port Elizabeth and enhancing wool exports. The town served as a conservative electoral constituency from 1910 to 1981, consistently returning Afrikaans-speaking National Party members, reflecting its rural, white-dominated polity.

Culturally, the town nurtured talents like artist Walter Battiss (1906–1982), born locally, whose modernist works drew on Xhosa motifs and rock art. Institutions like the Somerset East Museum (housed in the old parsonage) preserved frontier artifacts, including Slachter's Nek relics, fostering a narrative centered on white settler heritage.

=== Renaming Somerset East to KwaNojoli ===
In March 2023 the town was officially renamed KwaNojoli, honoring Xhosa etymology and the area's pre-colonial significance, particularly the legacy of Nojoli. Documented oral histories depict Nojoli as a real 18th-century Thembu princess (daughter of Nkosi Ndungwana), who married Xhosa chief Rharhabe and became his inkosikazi enkulu (great wife). The publication asserts she lived at Rharhabe's Great Kraal (iDlelo) "under the foot of Boschberg," with the mountain itself named Intaba kaNojoli ("Nojoli's Mountain") after her. This ties the area's "spiritual and communal ties" to her legacy.

The change, approved by the South African Geographical Names Council, sparked debate: proponents viewed it as restorative justice, while critics decried erasure of colonial history. Community dialogues, facilitated by groups like the Jakes Gerwel Foundation, highlighted racial tensions but fostered cohesion. Abel Boyce Piki's advocacy was instrumental, with his efforts culminating in the name's revival just before his passing in 2024.

=== KwaNojoli challenges ===
In the post-apartheid era, KwaNojoli within the Blue Crane Route Local Municipality has grappled with chronic service delivery failures, including prolonged water outages and electricity disruptions that have sparked resident protests. In January 2022, locals burned tires outside the municipal offices after enduring 38 days without piped water since December 2021, highlighting infrastructural neglect and inadequate maintenance. By October 2025, households faced over three weeks of dry taps, dependent on sporadic water truck deliveries amid reports of sabotaged infrastructure and mismanagement. These issues reflect broader causal shortcomings in local governance, such as poor financial oversight and failure to sustain basic utilities, exacerbating resource strains from informal population growth without corresponding capacity expansion.

Local economic interventions via the Blue Crane Development Agency (BCDA) have aimed to counter peripheral decline through project facilitation, including tourism promotion and small-scale infrastructure upgrades, though outcomes remain limited with high national failure rates. Assets like the Somerset East Aerodrome, completed in 2016 for R53 million, was reduced to a hazardous grazing area after fencing theft went unaddressed. The Progress Flight Academy, which rented the aerodrome for entry-level pilot training, was forced to quit in 2023 due to increasing hazardous landing conditions as cattle grazed uncontrolled in the area. Plans are currently afoot for a State-owned multi-purpose industrial park adjacent to the now unused aerodrome, in an attempt to create much-needed employment.

== Educational institutions ==
- Gill College, a Secondary School, is one of the oldest educational institutes in the Eastern Cape
- Gill Primary serves as a feeder school for Gill College
- Aeroville Secondary School
- William Oates Primary School
- W G Olivier Primary School
- Nonzwakazi Primary School
- Gilbert Xuza Junior Primary School
- St. Teresa's Roman Catholic Primary School

== Notable residents ==
- William Gill was a British-born surgeon and naturalist who practiced in the Cape Colony. He is best known for the large bequest in his will that established Gill College.
- Walter Battiss was a pioneering abstract painter and the creator of the imaginative “Fook Island” concept.
- William "Don" Craib was a physician, cardiologist and medical researcher. In the 1920s he proposed the doublet hypothesis, a theory of how the heart's electrical action currents arise, which was an early contribution to the understanding of the electrocardiogram
- Walter Rubusana was a Congregational minister, teacher, writer, and pioneering politician. He co-founded the Xhosa language newspaper publication, Izwi Labantu and was the first Black person to be elected to the Cape Council (Parliament) in 1909. He initiated the Native Education Association that contributed towards the formation of the South African Native National Congress (SANNC) in 1912 and later renamed the African National Congress in 1923.
- Ivan Mitford-Barberton was a sculptor, writer, and authority on heraldry.
- Jakes Gerwel was an academic, anti-apartheid activist, and public servant. He served as a director-general in the presidency of Nelson Mandela. In 1999 Gerwel assisted in the brokered deal under which Lockerbie bombing suspects were extradited to Scotland. He chaired the Nelson Mandela Foundation and the Mandela Rhodes Foundation.
- Gert Myburgh was a long-serving representative of the National Party. who served as Deputy Minister of Law and Order from 1992 to 1994, and as Deputy Minister of Justice from January 1995 until his death in March 1996.
- Jackie de Villiers was the Judge President of the Cape Provincial Division of the Supreme Court.
- Nonkqubela Pieters is a politician and educator.
- John Kepe was a stock thief and murderer, who evaded being captured for 12 years. He was eventually apprehended and executed.
- Gavin Watson was the CEO of African Global Operations (previously known as Bosasa), until his death in 2019. His company was implicated in state capture during judicial hearings in January 2019.

== Coat of arms (pre-2000) ==
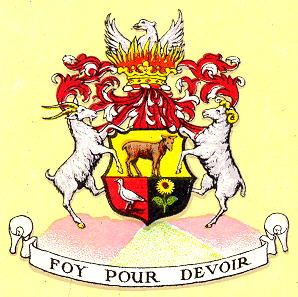
Somerset East Coat of Arms

Somerset East established a municipality in 1884. By 1931, the town council had assumed a coat of arms.

The shield is divided horizontally. The upper half depicts a bushbuck on a golden background. The lower half is divided vertically, depicting a swallow on a red background and a sunflower on a black background. The swallow was taken from the arms of Gill College and the sunflower possibly from the badge of a now-defunct local school. The supporters are a goat and a ram.

The crest is a phoenix issuing from a golden crown, and the motto is Foy pour devoir (Faith for duty, or Fidelity unto Duty), both elements similar to that of the Duke of Somerset.

Somerset East was incorporated into a larger municipality (Blue Crane Route) after the 2000 local government reforms, and individual town coats of arms were generally discontinued in favor of modern municipal logos or emblems. The current Blue Crane Route Municipality uses a logo featuring a traditional African shield with blue cranes (the national bird after which the municipality is named), the Boschberg mountain, and streams.
