= 1958 France rugby union tour of South Africa =

- Manager: Serge Saulnier
Summary
P	W	D	L
Total
10	5	2	3
Test match
2	1	1	0
Opponent
P	W	D	L
South Africa
2	1	1	0
Rhodesia
1	1	0	0

The 1958 France rugby union tour of South Africa was a series of matches played by the France national rugby union team in South Africa in July and August 1958. The French team played ten matches, of which they won five. One of the tour matches was against Rhodesia. They won the Test Series 1–0 against the Springboks.

== Results ==
Scores and results list France's points tally first.

	Date	Opponent	Location	Result	Score
Match 1	12 July	Rhodesia	Salisbury	Won	19–0
Match 2	16 July	Northern and Western Transvaal	Loftus Versfeld, Pretoria	Lost	18–19
Match 3	19 July	Eastern Transvaal, Natal and Transvaal	Springs	Won	16–14
Match 4	22 July	Orange Free State, Griqualand West and South-West Africa	Bloemfontein	Drew	11–11
Match 5	26 July	SOUTH AFRICA	Newlands, Cape Town	Drew	3–3
Match 6	30 July	Western Province, Boland and South Western Districts	Wellington	Lost	8–38
Match 7	2 August	Junior Springboks	Port Elizabeth	Lost	5–9
Match 8	6 August	Border, Eastern Province and North Eastern Districts	East London	Won	16–9
Match 9	9 August	South African Universities	Durban	Won	32–16
Match 10	16 August	SOUTH AFRICA	Ellis Park, Johannesburg	Won	9–5

== Tour match ==
12 July 1958

Rhodesia (Southern Rhodesia)	0–19	France

Salisbury

== The Tests ==
=== First Test ===
26 July 1958

South Africa	3–3	France
Lochner (3 – 1t)		(3 – 1dg) Danos

Newlands, Cape Town
Attendance: 105,000
Referee: (South Africa) Bertie Strasheim

FB	15	Mickey Gerber
RW	14	Jan Prinsloo
IC	13	Jeremy Nel
OC	12	Wilf Rosenberg
LW	11	Loftie Fourie
FH	10	Ian Kirkpatrick
SH	9	Popeye Strydom
LP	1	Chris Koch
HK	2	Bertus van der Merwe
TP	3	Piet du Toit
LL	4	Johan Steenekamp
RL	5	Johan Claassen (c)
BF	6	Hugo van Zyl
OF	7	Martin Pelser
N8	8	Butch Lochner

FB	15	Pierre Lacaze
RW	14	Jean-Vincent Dupuy
IC	13	Arnaud Marquesuzaa
OC	12	Guy Stener
LW	11	Henri Rancoule
FH	10	Roger Martine
SH	9	Pierre Danos
LP	1	Aldo Quaglio
HK	2	Robert Vigier
TP	3	Alfred Roques
LL	4	Lucien Mias (c)
RL	5	Bernard Momméjat
BF	6	François Moncla
OF	7	Jean Carrere
N8	8	Jean Barthe

=== Second Test ===
16 August 1958

South Africa	5–9	France
Fourie (3 – 1t); Gerber (2 – 1c)		(6 – 1pg, 1dg) Lacaze (3 – 1dg) Martine

Ellis Park, Johannesburg
Attendance: 50,000
Referee: (South Africa) Chris Ackermann

FB	15	Mickey Gerber
RW	14	Jan Prinsloo
IC	13	Joe Kaminer
OC	12	Alan Skene
LW	11	Loftie Fourie
FH	10	Jeremy Nel
SH	9	Tommy Gentles
LP	1	Chris Koch
HK	2	Abie Malan
TP	3	Piet du Toit
LL	4	Jan Pickard
RL	5	Johan Claassen (c)
BF	6	Dawie Ackermann
OF	7	Louis Schmidt
N8	8	Butch Lochner

FB	15	Pierre Lacaze
RW	14	Jean-Vincent Dupuy
IC	13	Arnaud Marquesuzaa
OC	12	Guy Stener
LW	11	Henri Rancoule
FH	10	Roger Martine
SH	9	Pierre Danos
LP	1	Aldo Quaglio
HK	2	Robert Vigier
TP	3	Alfred Roques
LL	4	Lucien Mias (c)
RL	5	Bernard Momméjat
BF	6	François Moncla
OF	7	Jean Carrere
N8	8	Jean Barthe

== Touring party ==
- Manager: Serge Saulnier
- Assistant Manager: Marcel Laurent
- Captain: Lucien Mias

=== Forwards ===
Raoul Barrière Jean Barthe Robert Baulon Jean Carrère Louis Casaux Michel Celaya Pierre Danos Jean Dupuy Louis Echave Pierre Fremaux Jean de Grogorio André Haget Pierre Lacaze Pierre Lacroix Jacques Lepatey Arnaud Marquesuzaa Roger Martine Bernard Mommejat François Moncla Aldo Quaglio Henri Rancoule Lucien Roge Alfred Roques Guy Stener Michel Vannier Roger Vigier
