= 1960 France rugby union tour of Argentina and Uruguay =

Summary
P	W	D	L
Total
13	13	0	0
Test match
3 (Note: Not recognized as test by the FFR)	3	0	0
Opponent
P	W	D	L
Argentina
3	3	0	0
Uruguay
1	1	0	0
Chile
1	1	0	0

The 1960 France rugby union tour of South America was a series of rugby union matches played by the France national team in Argentina, Uruguay and Chile.

France played a series of matches in Argentina (including three tests v the national team) and also two games in Chile and Uruguay, although those are not considered tests by the French Federation.

== Touring party ==
- President: René Crabos
- Coach: Marcel Laurent
- Referee: Bernard Marie
- Press Agent: Denis Lalanne

=== Players ===
- Michel Vannier
- Roger Brethes
- Jean Dupuy
- Henri Rancoule
- Guy Boniface
- Arnaud Marquesuzaa
- Jean Othats
- Pierre Dizabo
- Michel Lacome
- Roger Martine
- Pierre Danos
- Pierre Lacroix
- François Moncla
- Michel Crauste
- Michel Celaya
- Sylvain Meyer
- Jean Carrere
- Roland Crancele
- Herve Larrue
- Jean-Pierre Saux
- Amedee Domenech
- Alfred Roques
- Raoul Barriere
- Jean de Grégorio
- Jacques Rollet

== Match details ==
Complete list of matches played by France in South America:

9 July 1960

Deportiva Francesa	3–14	France
Try: Olivieri		Try: Celaya; Rancoule, Boniface; Con: Vannier; Drop: Vannier

Gimnasia y Esgrima, Buenos Aires
Referee: Bernard Marie (France)

13 July 1960

Gimnasia y Esgrima (BA)	6–40	France
Try: Billinghurst (1 by scrum)		Try: Rancoule (2), Crauste; Carrere, Monclá (2); Crancée, Martine; Lacroix, Domenech; Con: Vannier 5

Gimnasia y Esgrima, Buenos Aires
Referee: Ramón Corbelle (Argentina)

17 July 1960

Club Universitario B.A.	3–26	France
Pen: Blacksley		Try: Rancoule; Lacroix, Domenech, Saux; Con: Vannier 4 Pen: Vannier 2

Gimnasia y Esgrima, Buenos Aires
Referee: Bernard Marie (France)

20 July 1960

Pueyrredón	0–26	France
		Try: Rancoule, Carrere 2 Barriere, Othats; Con: Danos 2, Brethes 2 Drop: Dupuy

Gimnasia y Esgrima, Buenos Aires
Referee: Eduardo Niño (Argentina)

=== First test ===
23 July 1960

Argentina	3–37	France
Pen: Devoto		Try: Lacroix, Larrue; Boniface, Celaya (2) de Gregorio, Domenech (2); Marquesuzaa; Con: Vannier 5

Gimnasia y Esgrima, Buenos Aires

Team details

Argentina: 15.Rodolfo Devoto, 14.Enrique Krossler, 13.Esteban Karplus, 12.Ricardo Oliveri, 11.Enrico Neri, 10.Isidro Comas (cap), 9.Eduardo Gonzalez del Solar, 8.Florencio Varela, 7.Glauco Wessek, 6.Jorge Pulido, 5.Aitor Otano, 4.Rodolfo Schmidt, 3.Eduardo Sorhaburu, 2.Juan Casanegra, 1.Elias Gavina
France: 15.Michel Vannier, 14.Henri Rancoule, 13.Guy Boniface, 12.Arnaud Marquesuzaa, 11.Jean-Vincent Dupuy, 10.Pierre Dizabo, 9.Pierre Lacroix, 8.Michel Celaya, 7.François Moncla (cap), 6.Michel Crauste, 5.Jean-Pierre Saux, 4.Herve Larrue, 3.Alfred Roques, 2.Jean de Gregorio, 1.Amedee Domenech

27 July 1960

San Fernando	5–60	France
Try: 1 penalty try Con: J. Campos		Try: Boniface, Crauste 3 Domenech, Dupuy 2 Othats 3, Meyer, 2 Lacome, Roqués; Pen: Brethes 8, Othats

Gimnasia y Esgrima, Buenos Aires
Referee: Francisco Lamastra (Argentina)

30 July 1960

C.A. San Isidro	5–65	France
Try: Neri; Con: Molina		Try: Vannier, Boniface (2); Crauste (3), Martine (2= Lacroix (2), Domenech (2); Dupuy (2), Othats (3); Dizabo, Roqués; Con: Vannier (3), Othats

Gimnasia y Esgrima, Buenos Aires
Referee: Bernard Marie (France)

3 August

La Tablada	8–69	France
Try: E. Quetglas, A. Quetglas; Con: E. Moyano Bourel		Try: Rancoule, Boniface; Carrere (3), Dupuy (3); De Gregorio, Dizabo (2); Meyer (3), Lacome; Con: Brethes 12

Jockey Club Córdoba Country Deportivo, Córdoba

=== Second test ===
6 August 1960

Argentina	3–12	France
Try: Karplus		Try: Boniface (2); Con: Brethes; Drop: Dizabo

Gimnasia y Esgrima, Buenos Aires
Referee: Alberto Camardón (Argentina)

Team details

Argentina: 15.Jorge Ríos, 14.Enrique Krossler, 13.Esteban Karplus, 12.Ricardo Oliveri, 11.Carlos Giuliano, 10.Ángel Guastella, 9.Enrique Holmgren, 8.Enrique Mitchelstein, 7.Antonio Salinas (cap), 6.Carlos Alvarez, 5.Aitor Otaño, 4.Rodolfo Schmidt, 3.Cristóbal Hirsch, 2.Horacio Vidou, 1.Elías Gavina
France: 15.Michel Vannier, 14.Jean-Vincent Dupuy, 13.Guy Boniface, 12.Roger Martine, 11.Jean Othats, 10.Pierre Dizabo, 9.Pierre Lacroix, 8.Roland Crancee, 7.François Moncla (c), 6.Michel Crauste, 5.Michel Celaya, 4.Herve Larrue, 3.Alfred Roques, 2.Jacques Rollet, 1.Amedee Domenech

10 August 1960

Stade Français Paris Reforzado	6–55	France

Stade Français Paris Stadium, Santiago
Referee: Bernard Marie

13 August 1960

Pucará	9–27	France
Try: Schmidt; Con: Prieto (2)		Try: Rancoule, Celaya; Crauste, Lacroix 2 Dizabo, Lacome; Con: Brethes 3

Gimnasia y Esgrima, Buenos Aires
Referee: Eduardo Lambruschini (Argentina)

=== Third test ===
17 August 1960

Argentina	6–29	France
Pen: Rios 2		Try: Boniface, Crancee; Dizabo, Dupuy (2), Lacroix; Con: Vannier (4); Drop: Vannier

Gimnasia y Esgrima, Buenos Aires
Referee: Bernard Marie (France)

Team details

'Argentina: 15.Jorge Rios, 14.Enrique Krossler, 13.Esteban Karplus, 12.Ricardo Oliveri, 11.Enrico Neri, 10.Juan Guidi, 9.Enrique Holmgren, 8.Enrique Mitchelstein, 7.Antonio Salinas (cap), 6.John Vibart, 5.Aitor Otano, 4.Rodolfo Schmidt, 3.Cristobal Hirsch, 2.Juan Casanegra, 1.Walter Aniz
France: M. Vannier, J. Dupuy, R. Martine, G. Boniface, J. Othats; P. Dizabo, P. Lacroix; M. Crauste, R. Crancée, F. Monclá (cap.), M. Celaya, H. Larrue; A. Domenech, J. Rollet, A. Roqués

20 August 1960

Uruguay	0–59	France
	Report	Try: Brethes; Lacome, Meyer (3); Moncla, Othats (5); Rancoule (2), Vannier; Con: Vannier (6), Brethes

Carrasco Polo Club, Montevideo
Referee: Bernard Marie (France)

Uruguay: L.Vásquez; Agustín Canessa, B. Fontana, Penco, E. Llovet; D. Moor-Davie, R. Hoober; H. Pugh, G. Sebasti, J. Shaw; Alvaro Canessa, H. Bergmann; G. Dupont, R. Vivo, A. Hughes
France: M. Vannier; J. Othats, M. Lacome, R. Martine, H. Rancoule; R. Brethes, P. Dizabo; M. Crauste, R. Crancée, F. Monclá (cap.); S. Meyer, J. Saux; A. Domenech, J. de Gregorio, A. Roques
