= Roger Fite =

French rugby union player (1938–2020)

- Born: 13 October 1938 Cabrerolles, France
- Died: 28 November 2020 (aged 82) Brive-la-Gaillarde, France
- Height: 1.90 m (6 ft 3 in)

Rugby union career
- Position: Second Row
Senior career
Years	Team	Apps	(Points)
?–1957	CCA Capdenac		
1957–1962	Cahors Rugby		
1962–1975	CA Brive		
1975–1980	SC Tulle		
1980–1982	US Terrasson		
International career
Years	Team	Apps	(Points)
1963	France	2	(0)

Roger Fite (13 October 1938 – 28 November 2020) was a French rugby union player.

== Biography ==
Born in Cabrerolles, he began playing for CCA Capdenac in Aveyron, where his family settled. In 1957, he joined Cahors Rugby, where he played alongside Alfred Roques and Bernard Momméjat. He joined CA Brive in 1962.

Fite made his first international appearance with France on 23 March 1963 against Wales as part of the 1963 Five Nations Championship. He played against Italy. Throughout his time at CA Brive, he appeared in 192 matches, including four finals, all of which were lost. He then played for SC Tulle for five seasons and US Terrasson for two seasons.

After his playing career, Fite became President of the Comité du Limousin. He also sat on the steering committee of the French Rugby Federation.

Roger Fite died on 28 November 2020 at the age of 82.
