= Bastanès =

- Commune
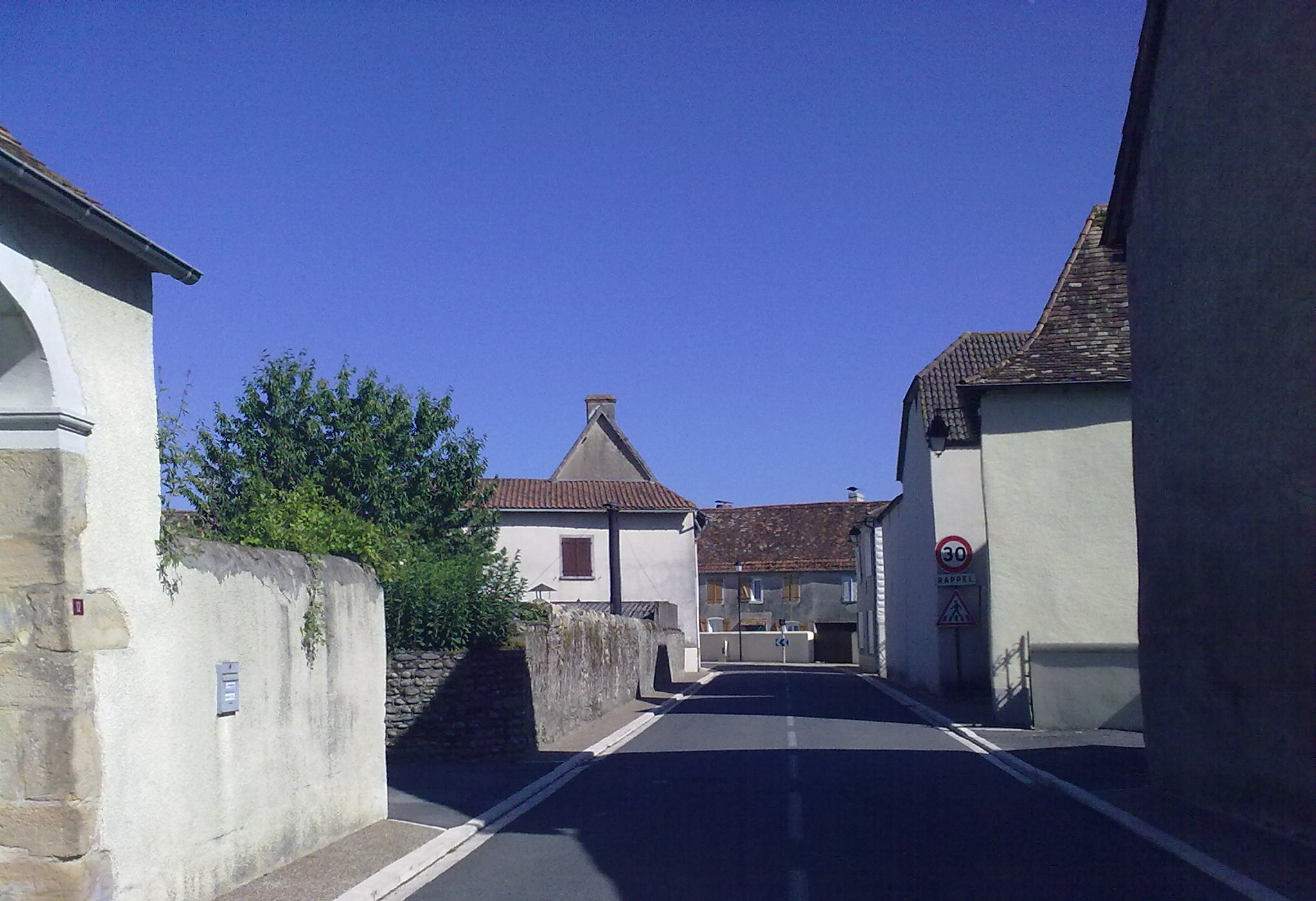
- The main street
- Location of Bastanès
- Location within France Location within Nouvelle-Aquitaine
- Coordinates: 43°20′55″N 0°46′09″W
- Country: France
- Region: Nouvelle-Aquitaine
- Department: Pyrénées-Atlantiques
- Arrondissement: Oloron-Sainte-Marie
- Canton: Le Cœur de Béarn
- Intercommunality: Béarn des Gaves

Government
  - Mayor (2020–2026): Thierry Gère
- Area^{1}: 5.26 km^{2} (2.03 sq mi)
- Elevation: 135 m (443 ft)
- Highest elevation: 265 m (869 ft)
- Lowest elevation: 99 m (325 ft)
- Population (2023): 96
  - Density: 18/km^{2} (47/sq mi)
- Time zone: UTC+01:00 (CET)
  - Summer (DST): UTC+02:00 (CEST)
- INSEE/Postal code: 64099 /64190
- ^{1} French Land Register data, which excludes lakes, ponds, glaciers > 1 km^{2} (0.386 sq mi or 247 acres) and river estuaries.

Bastanès (French pronunciation: [bastanɛs]) is a commune in the Pyrénées-Atlantiques department in the Nouvelle-Aquitaine region of south-western France.

== Geography ==
Bastanès is in the former province of Béarn some 12 km east by south-east of Sauveterre-de-Béarn and some 13 km south of Orthez. Access to the commune is by the D947 road from Loubieng in the north which passes south-east through the western part of the commune and the village and continues south-east to Navarrenx. The D27 branches off the D947 near the village and goes north-west to Bugnein. The commune is mainly farmland in the south-west with the rest mixed forest and farmland.

The Gave d'Oloron forms the south-western border of the commune as it flows north-west to join the Gave de Pau at Peyrehorade. The Saleys river forms the north-eastern border of the commune as it flows north-west to eventually join the Gave d'Oloron east of Saint-Pé-de-Léren. The Barthes stream rises just east of the village and flows north-west to join the Gave d'Oloron at Audaux. The Hérre river rises in the east of the commune and flows north-west to join the Saleys east of Castetbon.

=== Places and hamlets ===
- Aresteron
- Banche
- Les Barthes
- Bernadou (ruins)
- Boussaque
- Briscain
- Les Camous
- Caulongue
- Les Coustères
- La Hittau
- Hourquet
- Laberdesque
- Labrenabe
- Lacoste
- Lanusse
- Laplacette
- Lassègue
- Lompré-de-Haut
- Manibelle
- Le Moulin
- La Plaine
- Puyounè
- Ribeton

== Toponymy ==
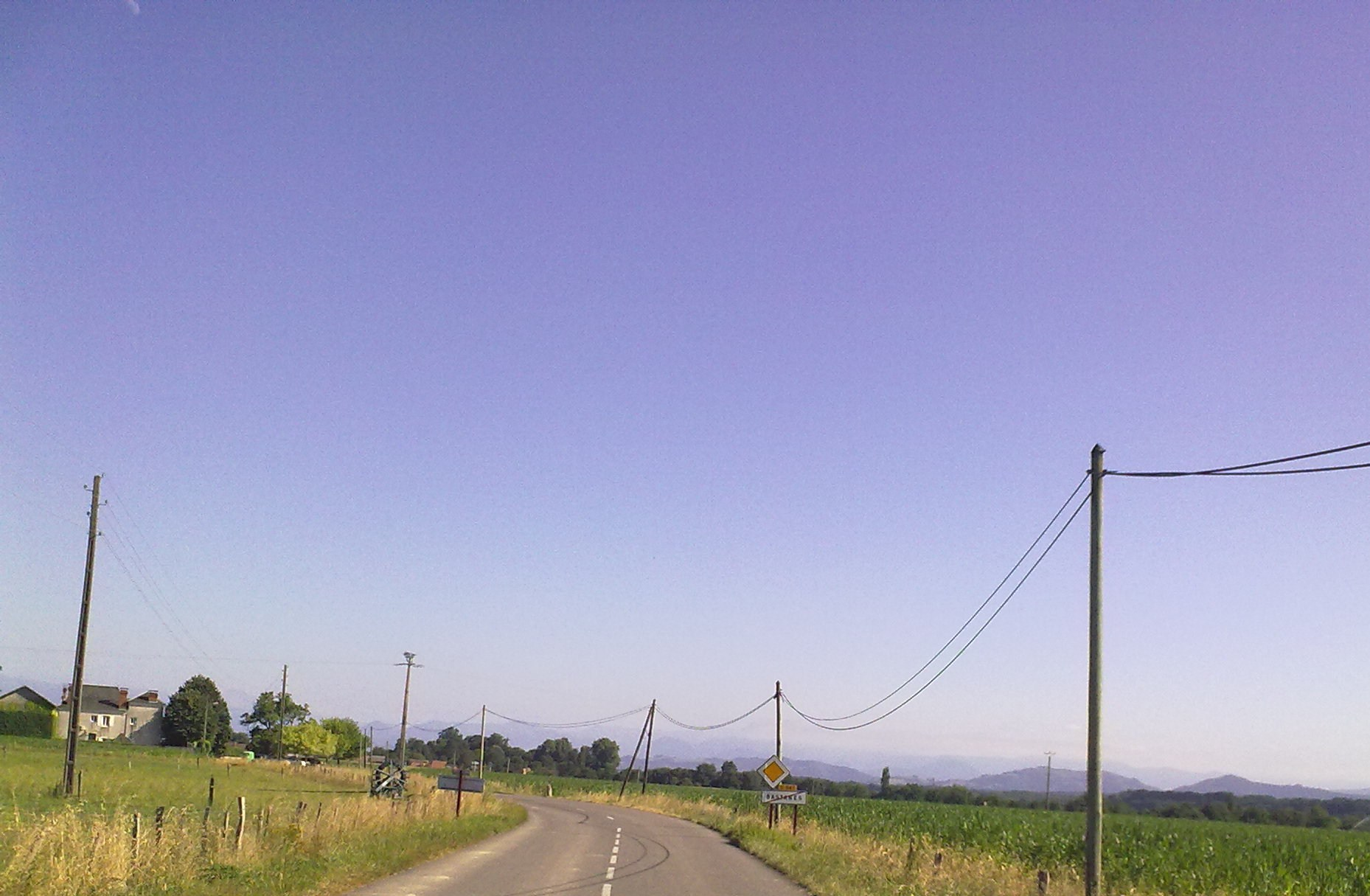
Exit from Bastanès

The commune name in Gascon Occitan is also Bastanès. According to Michel Grosclaude the name comes from the gascon basta meaning "gorse" with an obscure suffix, probably giving "moorish terrain".

The following table details the origins of the commune name and other names in the commune.

Name	Spelling	Date	Source	Page	Origin	Description
Bastanès	Bastanès	11th century	Raymond	23	Marca	Village
	Bastenes	1375	Raymond	23	Luntz	
	Bastanees	1385	Raymond	23	Notaries	
	Bastannes	1540	Raymond	23	Reformation	
	Sanctus Laurentius de Bastanès	1608	Raymond	23	Insinuations	
	Baftanés	1750	Cassini			
	Ba?tanés	1790	Cassini1			
	Bastanez	1801	Ldh/EHESS/Cassini		Bulletin des Lois	

Sources:

- Raymond: Topographic Dictionary of the Department of Basses-Pyrenees, 1863, on the page numbers indicated in the table. (in French)
- Grosclaude: Toponymic Dictionary of communes, Béarn, 2006 (in French)
- Cassini: 1750 Cassini Map
- Cassini1: 1790 Cassini Map
- Ldh/EHESS/Cassini: Des villages de Cassini aux communes d'aujourd'hui: Commune data sheet Bastanès, EHESS (in French).

Origins:

- Marca: Pierre de Marca, History of Béarn.
- Luntz: Contracts retained by Luntz
- Notaries: Notaries of Navarrenx
- Reformation: Reformation of Béarn
- Insinuations: Insinuations of the Diocese of Oloron

== History ==
Paul Raymond noted on page 23 of his 1863 dictionary that in 1385 Bastanès had 28 fires and depended on the bailiwick of Navarrenx.

== Administration ==
List of Successive Mayors

From	To	Name
1995	2014	Jacques Langla
2014	2026	Thierry Gère

=== Intercommunality ===
The commune is part of five inter-communal structures:

- the Communauté de communes du Béarn des Gaves;
- the AEP association of Navarrenx;
- the energy association of Pyrénées-Atlantiques;
- the tax collection association of Navarrenx;
- the inter-communal association of the Gaves and the Saleys.

== Demography ==
Historical population

Year	Pop.	±% p.a.
1793	203	—
1821	250	+0.75%
1846	289	+0.58%
1872	227	−0.92%
1901	234	+0.10%
1926	152	−1.71%
1946	122	−1.09%
1962	136	+0.68%
1968	143	+0.84%

Year	Pop.	±% p.a.
1975	132	−1.14%
1982	143	+1.15%
1990	105	−3.79%
1999	97	−0.88%
2007	100	+0.38%
2012	102	+0.40%
2017	99	−0.60%
2023	96	−0.51%

Source: EHESS and INSEE

== Economy ==
Economic activity is mainly agricultural - livestock, pastures, and corn. The commune is included in the Appellation d'origine contrôlée of Ossau-iraty

== Culture and heritage ==
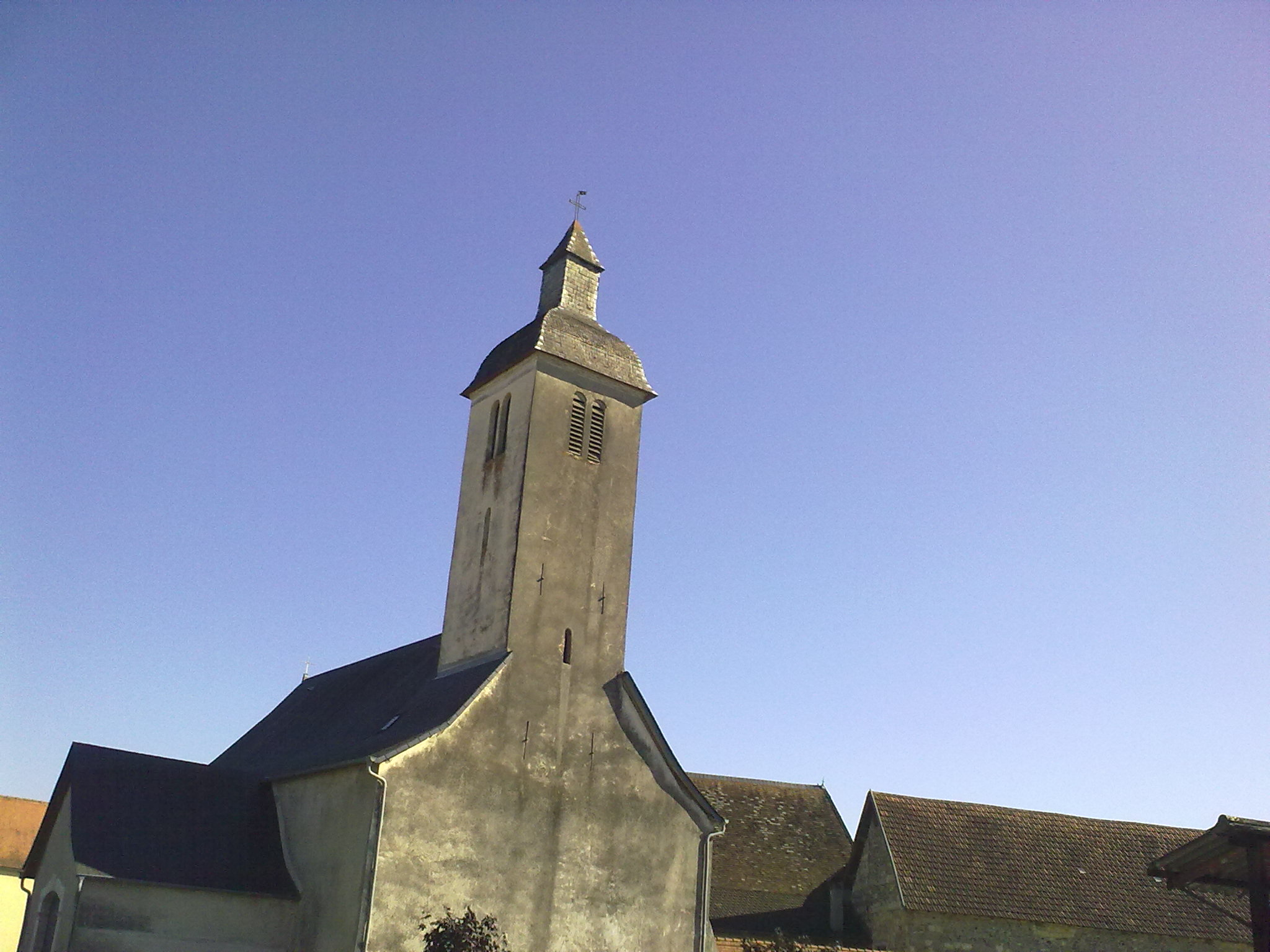
The Church of Saint-Laurent

=== Religious heritage ===
The Parish Church of Saint-Laurent (1860) is registered as an historical monument.

=== Sports ===
The commune was on the route of the 16th stage of the Tour de France in 2007 on the 25 July. The stage was 218 km from Orthez to the Col d'Aubisque at Gourette.

== See also ==
- Communes of the Pyrénées-Atlantiques department
