= Audaux =

- Commune
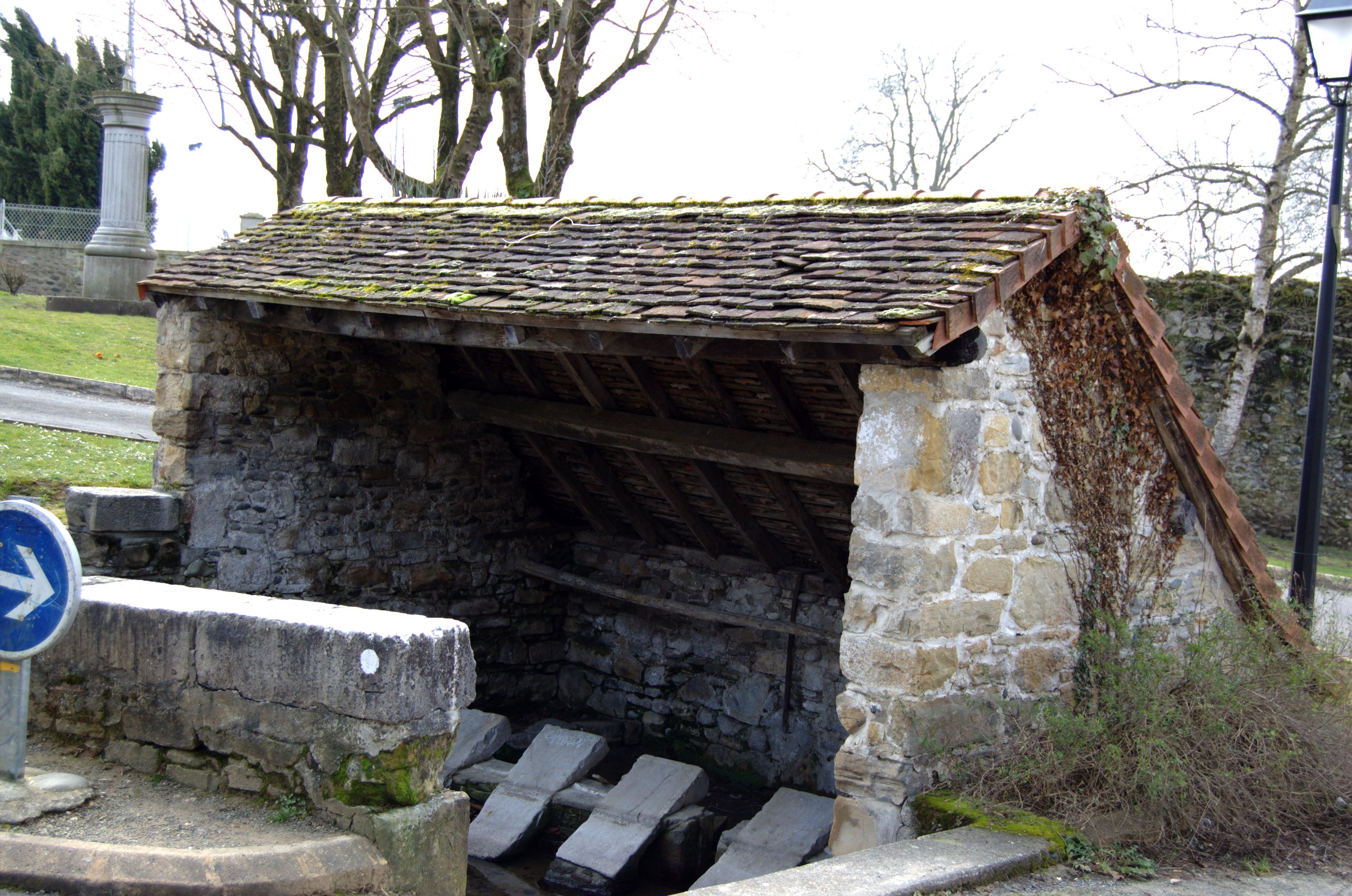
- The Audaux Lavoir (Public laundry)
- Location of Audaux
- Location within France Location within Nouvelle-Aquitaine
- Coordinates: 43°21′32″N 0°47′27″W
- Country: France
- Region: Nouvelle-Aquitaine
- Department: Pyrénées-Atlantiques
- Arrondissement: Oloron-Sainte-Marie
- Canton: Le Cœur de Béarn
- Intercommunality: CC Béarn des Gaves

Government
  - Mayor (2020–2026): Kattalin Quentin
- Area^{1}: 7.33 km^{2} (2.83 sq mi)
- Elevation: 127 m (417 ft)
- Highest elevation: 229 m (751 ft)
- Lowest elevation: 98 m (322 ft)
- Population (2023): 171
  - Density: 23.3/km^{2} (60.4/sq mi)
- Time zone: UTC+01:00 (CET)
  - Summer (DST): UTC+02:00 (CEST)
- INSEE/Postal code: 64075 /64190
- ^{1} French Land Register data, which excludes lakes, ponds, glaciers > 1 km^{2} (0.386 sq mi or 247 acres) and river estuaries.

Audaux (French pronunciation: [odoks]; Occitan: Audaus) is a commune in the Pyrénées-Atlantiques department in the Nouvelle-Aquitaine region of south-western France.

== Geography ==
Audaux is located some 18 km south of Orthez and 6 km north-west of Navarrenx. Access to the commune is by the D27 road from Bugnein in the south-east passing through the south of the commune and the village and continuing to Laàs in the west. The D427 branches off the D27 in the commune and goes to Castetbon in the north. The D947 highway passes through the north of the commune as it goes from Bastanès in the south-east to Orthez. Apart from the village there is the hamlet of Geup west of the village and Lacamoire in the north of the commune on the D947. The commune is mixed forest and farmland with most of the land area farmland.

The Gave d'Oloron forms all of the south-western border as it flows north-west to join the Gave de Pau forming the Gaves réunis at Peyrehorade. The Barthes forms the eastern border of the commune as it flows south to join the Gave d'Oloron. The Ruisseau de Labaigt flows south through the centre of the commune and through Geap to join the Gave d'Oloron. The Saleys river flows across the north of the commune from east to west and it continues north-west to join the Gave d'Oloron east of Saint-Pé-de-Léren.

=== Places and hamlets ===
- Andréou (ruins)
- Anglade
- Arées
- Aureyte (fountain)
- Baherle
- Bendéjac
- Camous
- Camp des Maures
- Capdeville
- Les Carrérasses
- Casenave
- Castet
- Coos
- Coustet
- L'Esquille
- Geup
- Hountet
- Hourpélat
- Hourquabillé
- Hourracq
- Laborde
- Lacamoire
- Lafouillère
- Lalanne
- Mirassou
- Le Moulin
- La Pépinière
- Perdigué
- Puyalou
- Saut
- Les Vignes

== Toponymy ==
The name in Bearnese is Audaus. Michel Grosclaude proposed a possible etymology from Aldene, an Aquitanian male name, with the suffix -os.

The following table details the origins of the names in the commune:

Name	Spelling	Date	Source	Page	Origin	Description
Audaux	Aldeos	11th century	Grosclaude			Village
	Aldaus	11th century	Raymond	16	Marca	
	Audaus	1178	Raymond	16	Duchesne	
	Sent Bisentz d'Audaus	1612	Raymond	16	Insinuations	
	Audaux	1750	Grosclaude		Cassini	
	Andaux	1801	Cassini		Bulletin des lois	
Arées	Arees	1385	Raymond	9	Census	Farm
	Arès	1863	Raymond	9		
La Camoire	Lo molin de La Camoere	1571	Raymond	39	Reformation	Hamlet
Conques	Los Conquees	1476	Raymond	52	Castetner	Hamlet & Fief dependent on the bailiwick of Larbaig and vassal of the Marquis of Gassion
	Conquez	1686	Raymond	52	Reformation	
	Conquetz	1728	Raymond	52	Gassion	
Coos	Lo Cos	1385	Raymond	52	Census	Farm
Les Marsains	Los Marsains	1289	Raymond	109	Camptort	Fief dependent on the Marquis of Gassion
	Los Marsanhs	1376	Raymond	109	Military	
	Los Marssaynz	1540	Raymond	109	Reformation	
	Les Marsans	1683	Raymond	109	Reformation	
	Marsoinx	1719	Raymond	109	Enumeration	
	Marseings	1728	Raymond	109	Gassion	

Sources:

- Grosclaude: Toponymic Dictionary of communes, Béarn, 2006 (in French)
- Raymond: Topographic Dictionary of the Department of Basses-Pyrenees, 1863, on the page numbers indicated in the table. (in French)
- Cassini: Des villages de Cassini aux communes d'aujourd'hui: Commune data sheet Audaux, EHESS (in French).

Origins:

- Marca: Pierre de Marca, History of Béarn.
- Duchesne: Duchesne collection volume CXIV
- Insinuations: Insinuations of the Diocese of Oloron
- Cassini: Cassini Map from 1750
- Census: Census of Béarn
- Reformation: Reformation of Béarn
- Castetner: Notaries of Castetner
- Gassion: Enumeration of Gassion
- Camptort: Titles of Camptort
- Military: Military Inspection of Béarn
- Enumeration: Enumeration of Audaux

== History ==
Paul Raymond noted on page 16 of his 1863 dictionary that in 1385 the commune depended on the bailiwick of Navarrenx and had 84 fires. Audaux was dependent of the Marquis of Gassion.

== Administration ==
List of Successive Mayors

From	To	Name
1995	2014	Marc Leprat
2014	2020	Charlette Laborde
2020	2026	Kattalin Quentin

=== Inter-communality ===
The commune is part of eight inter-communal structures:

- the Communauté de communes du Béarn des Gaves;
- the AEP association of Navarrenx;
- the Energy association of Pyrénées-Atlantiques;
- the association for promotion of Navarrenx;
- the association for schools in Gaveausset;
- the inter-communal association for sanitation Audaux - Bugnein 2 AB;
- the inter-communal association for the Gaves and the Saleys river;
- the joint oak forest association for the basque and bearnais valleys;

== Demography ==
Historical population

Year	Pop.	±% p.a.
1793	432	—
1821	370	−0.55%
1846	454	+0.82%
1872	395	−0.53%
1901	346	−0.46%
1926	264	−1.08%
1946	295	+0.56%
1954	366	+2.73%
1962	244	−4.94%

Year	Pop.	±% p.a.
1968	270	+1.70%
1975	264	−0.32%
1982	215	−2.89%
1990	203	−0.72%
1999	220	+0.90%
2007	192	−1.69%
2012	178	−1.50%
2017	164	−1.62%
2023	171	+0.70%

Source: EHESS and INSEE

Audaux has a very high proportion of non-permanent population (e.g. pupils in boarding schools): 31% (73 of 237) as of 2017. This is due to the private boarding school of Sainte-Bernadette having 110 students boarding there.

== Economy ==
Economic activity in the commune is mainly agricultural. The commune lies in the Appellation d'origine contrôlée (AOC) zone of Ossau-iraty.

== Culture and heritage ==
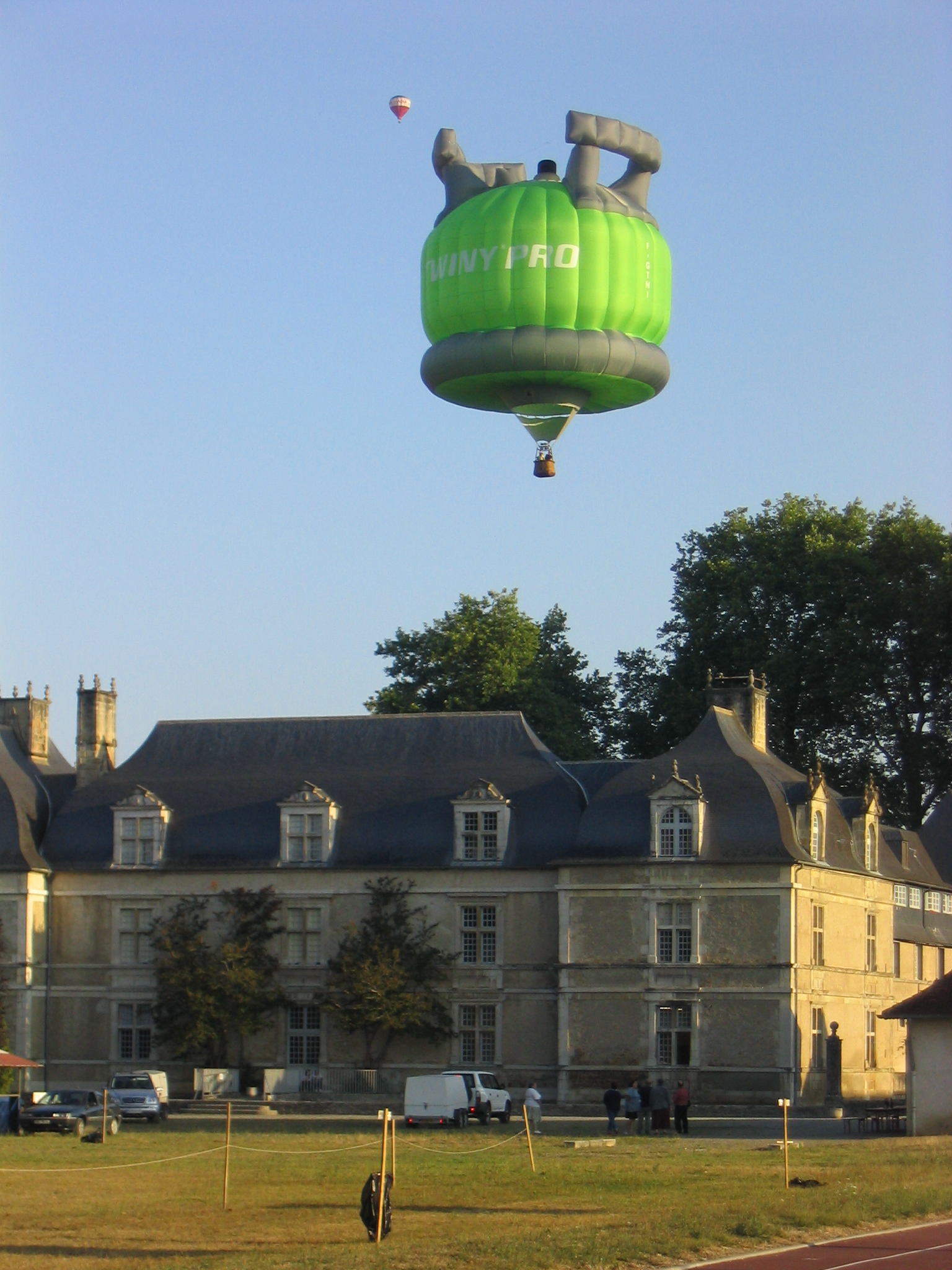
The Gassion Chateau with a hot air balloon

Since 1991 the village has held a rally of hot air balloons on the second weekend in July.

=== Civil heritage ===
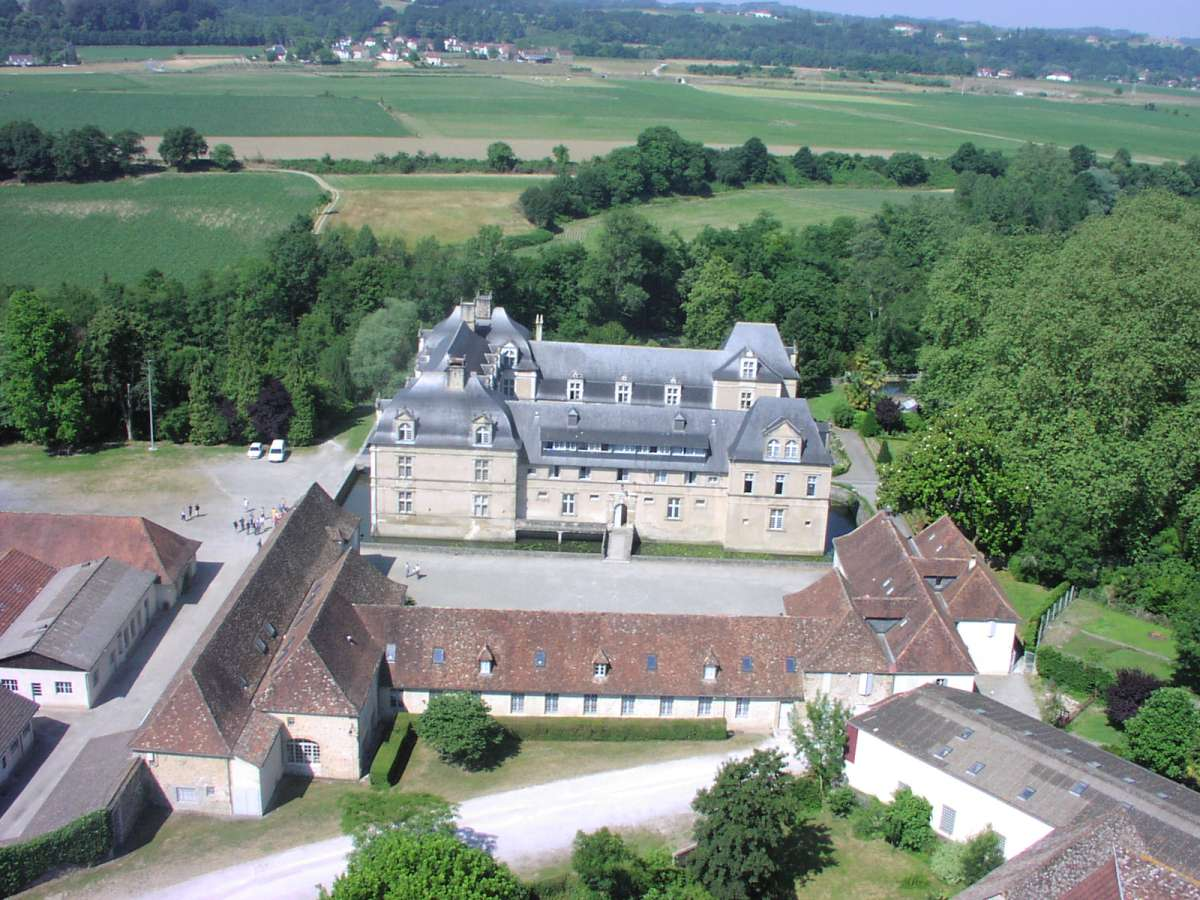
Aerial view of the Chateau of Audaux

The commune has one building that is registered as a historical monument:

- The Chateau of Audaux (1659). Since 1943 the chateau has belonged to the Foundation of Apprentices of Auteuil who have established a private scholastic institution called DSainte-Bernadette. Although it is a private castle, it can be visited with a historian guide during Heritage Day on the 2nd Sunday in September, on open days for the institution in late May, and during the "Castle Festival" in mid-July.

== Facilities ==
=== Education ===
The commune has an elementary school as well as the private institution of Sainte-Bernadette which has a college, a professional school, and a masonry apprenticeship unit.

== Notable people linked to the commune ==
- Isaac de Porthau, called Porthos, was a French military man born at Pau on 2 February 1617. He was the inspiration for Alexandre Dumas for the fictitious character Porthos in his novel The Three Musketeers. He came from a Béarnais Protestant family originally from Audaux.

== See also ==
- Communes of the Pyrénées-Atlantiques department

=== External links ===
- Audaux Commune website (in French)
- Audaux on Géoportail, National Geographic Institute (IGN) website (in French)
- Audaux on the 1750 Cassini Map
