= Jean Othats =

France international rugby union player

- Born: 6 May 1937 Bugnein, France
- Died: 10 September 1964 (aged 27) Lesperon, France
- Height: 6 ft 0 in (183 cm)
- Weight: 179 lb (81 kg)

Rugby union career
- Position: Wing three–quarter
International career
Years	Team	Apps	(Points)
1960	France	2	(0)

Jean Othats (6 May 1937 – 10 September 1964) was a French international rugby union player.

Born in Bugnein in the Pyrénées-Atlantiques, Othats was a wing three–quarter, capped twice for France against the Pumas on their 1960 tour of Argentina. He played his club rugby for both US Dax and CA Brive.

Othats was one of three US Dax players killed in a car accident on the night of 10 September 1964. They were returning home from an away match in Bordeaux and collided with a lorry. He was 27 years of age.

== See also ==
- List of France national rugby union players
