= Preez =

Preez or du Preez is a surname. Notable people with the name include:

- Ampie du Preez (born 1982), South African singer-songwriter
- Ashley Du Preez (born 1997), South African soccer player
- Branco du Preez (born 1990), South African rugby union player
- Carel du Preez (born 1993), South African rugby union player
- Charlene du Preez (born 1987), South African cyclist
- Cornell du Preez (born 1991), Scotland international rugby union player
- Dan du Preez (born 1995), South African international rugby union player
- Delarey du Preez (born 1975), South African rugby union player
- Dillon du Preez (born 1981), South African cricketer and coach
- Duggie Du Preez (1927–2000), South African boxer
- Ethan du Preez (born 2003), South African swimmer
- Fourie du Preez (born 1982), South African rugby union player
- Frik du Preez (born 1935), South African rugby union player
- Jackie du Preez (1942–2020), Rhodesian cricketer
- Jan du Preez (1930–2024), South African rugby union player
- Jan du Preez (1930–2024), South African rugby union player
- Jean-Luc du Preez (born 1995), South African international rugby union player
- Johan Du Preez (born 1936), Rhodesian (Zimbabwean) sprinter
- JP du Preez (born 1994), South African rugby union player
- Louis du Preez (born 1962), South African professor of zoology
- Max du Preez (born 1951), South African author
- Michiel du Preez (born 1996), Namibian cricketer
- Mignon du Preez (born 1989), South African cricketer
- Phil du Preez, South African military officer
- Philip du Preez (born 1993), South African rugby union player
- Pierre du Preez (born 1969), South African cricketer
- Pieter du Preez (born 1979), South African paratriathlete
- Robert du Preez (rugby union, born 1963) (born 1963), South Africa international rugby union player
- Robert du Preez (rugby union, born 1993) (born 1993), South Africa international rugby union player
- Shaun du Preez (born 1987), Namibian international rugby union player
- Wian du Preez (born 1982), South African rugby union player
