= Bernard Momméjat =

France international rugby union player

- Born: 18 May 1934 Paris, France
- Died: 9 December 2011 (aged 77) Toulouse, France
- Height: 6 ft 3 in (191 cm)
- Weight: 209 lb (95 kg)

Rugby union career
- Position: Lock
International career
Years	Team	Apps	(Points)
1958–63	France	22	(6)

Bernard Momméjat (18 May 1934 – 9 December 2011) was a French international rugby union player.

Born in Paris, Momméjat was trained in rugby by Cahors–based club Stade Cadurcien and played for their senior side until 1961, when he finished his career with stints at SC Albi and Stade Saint-Gaudinois.

Momméjat, an industrial designer by profession, was capped 22 times as a lock for France from 1958 to 1963, and at 6 ft 3 in was the tallest player to have represented the country up until that point. He featured in three successful Five Nations campaigns and played both matches of their series win over the Springboks on a 1958 of South Africa, where he formed a second row with Lucien Mias. On France's return from South Africa, both Momméjat and fellow Stade Cadurcien player Alfred Roques were awarded honorary citizenship of Cahors.

== See also ==
- List of France national rugby union players
