= Cahors Rugby =

French rugby union club, based in Cahors

(France) Cahors Rugby
- Full name: Cahors Rugby - Stade Cadurcien
- Founded: 1908
- Location: Cahors, France
- Ground: Stade Lucien Desprats
- League: Fédérale 1
- 2024–25: Fédérale 2, 1st (Promoted)
Team kit

Official website
- www.cahors-rugby.fr

Cahors Rugby are a French rugby union club. They currently compete in the Fédérale 1 competition, the fifth division of rugby in France. The club was established in 1908. They play at Stade Lucien Desprats, in Cahors. They were champions of the Fédérale 2 division in 2003.

== Honours ==
- Deuxième Division:
  - Champions: 2005
  - Runners-up: 1993
- Fédérale 2:
  - Champions: 2003

== Notable former players ==
- Alfred Roques
- David Auradou
- Abdelatif Benazzi
- Philippe Benetton
- Denis Charvet
- Michel Courtiols
- Roger Fite
- Dominique Harize
- Bernard Momméjat

== See also ==
- List of rugby union clubs in France
