= Louis Schmidt =

Louis Schmidt may refer to:

- Louis Schmidt (politician)
- Louis Schmidt (rugby union)
