= Robert Vigier =

France international rugby union player

- Born: 5 December 1926 Lanobre, France
- Died: 1 September 1986 (aged 59) Clermont-Ferrand, France
- Height: 5 ft 9 in (175 cm)
- Weight: 203 lb (92 kg)

Rugby union career
- Position: Hooker
International career
Years	Team	Apps	(Points)
1956–59	France	24	(3)

Robert Vigier (5 December 1926 – 1 September 1986) was a French international rugby union player.

Vigier was born in Lanobre and came up through the juniors of AS Montferrand to spend his entire senior career with the Clermont-Ferrand–based club. He began there as a centre three–quarter in the early 1940s and it wasn't until the 1952-53 season that he was tried as a hooker, the position in which he would represent France.

Between 1956 and 1959, Vigier was capped 24 times for France, debuting against Scotland at Murrayfield. His international career included France's 1958 tour of South Africa and a successful 1959 Five Nations campaign.

Vigier took over as coach of AS Montferrand towards the end of his playing career. After retiring due to a heart condition, Vigier stayed on as coach and in 1969-70 guided the club to the final of the French Championship.

== See also ==
- List of France national rugby union players
