= Melt Hanekom =

South Africa international rugby union player

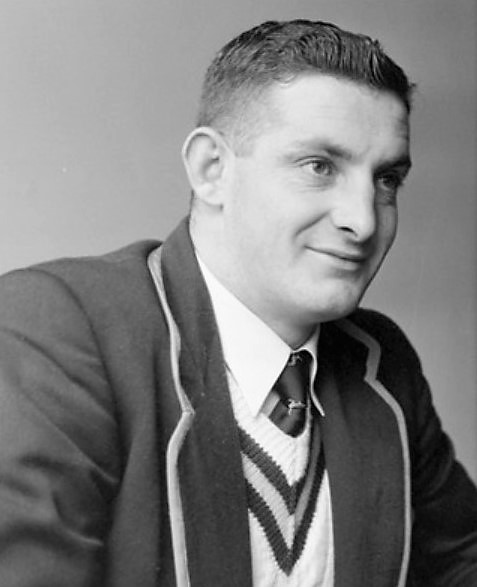
- Hanekom in New Zealand in 1956
- Born: Melt van der Spuy Hanekom; 27 July 1931 Moorreesburg, Union of South Africa
- Died: 8 October 1997 (aged 66) Strand, South Africa
- School: Hoërskool Dirkie Uys, Moorreesburg

Rugby union career
- Position: Hooker
Amateur team(s)
Years	Team	Apps	(Points)
- Moorreesburg RC
Provincial / State sides
Years	Team	Apps	(Points)
–	Boland		
International career
Years	Team	Apps	(Points)
1956	South Africa (tour)	9	(9)

Melt van der Spuy Hanekom (27 July 1931 – 8 October 1997) was a South African rugby union player.

== Playing career ==
Hanekom was born and raised in Moorreesburg. He played provincial rugby for Boland and although he was the second choice hooker for Boland, after his South Africa teammate, Bertus van der Merwe, he was also selected for the Springboks.

Hanekom toured with the Springboks to Australia and New Zealand in 1956. During the second match on tour, he broke his leg, but he did not leave the field and finished the match with the broken leg. The broken leg kept him off the field for just three weeks, after which he resumed his tour. Hanekom did not play in any test matches, but did play in nine tour matches and scored three tries.

== See also ==
- List of South Africa national rugby union players – Springbok no. 333
