= Pat Montini =

South African rugby union footballer

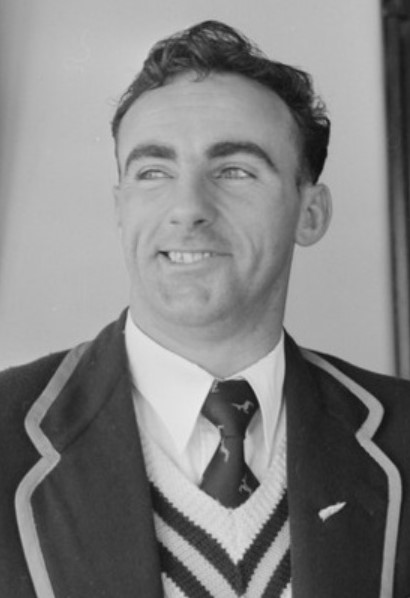
- Montini in New Zealand in 1956
- Born: Patrick Evan Montini; 15 June 1929 Cape Town, Western Cape, South Africa
- Died: 26 August 2008 (aged 79) Stellenbosch, Western Cape, South Africa
- Height: 1.80 m (5 ft 11 in)
- Weight: 72.5 kg (160 lb)
- School: Hoërskool Jan van Riebeeck, Cape Town
- University: Stellenbosch University

Rugby union career
- Position: Centre
Amateur team(s)
Years	Team	Apps	(Points)
- Gardens RFC
–	Worcester RFC		
–	Maties		
1955–57	Western Province		
1953–54	Boland		
International career
Years	Team	Apps	(Points)
1956	South Africa	2	

Patrick Evan Montini (15 June 1929 – 26 August 2008) was a South African rugby union player.

== Playing career ==
Montini attended the Hoërskool Jan van Riebeeck in Cape Town, where his centre partner in the school's first team was another future Springbok, Daantjie Rossouw. In 1949, after leaving school he played for Gardens Rugby Club in Cape Town and made his provincial debut for Western Province in 1951. In 1953 Montini moved to Worcester and played provincial rugby for Boland and in 1955, he relocated to Stellenbosch to study law at Stellenbosch University and was again selected to represent Western Province.

Montini made his test debut for the Springboks in the first test match against Australia during the 1956 Springbok tour of Australia and New Zealand, on 26 May 1956 at the SCG. Montini played two test matches and nine tour matches for South Africa. He did not score any points in tests, but scored one try and one drop goal in the tour matches.

=== Test history ===
No.	Opposition	Result (SA 1st)	Position	Tries	Date	Venue
1.	Australia	9–0	Centre		26 May 1956	Sydney Cricket Ground, Sydney
2.	Australia	9–0	Centre		2 June 1956	Brisbane Exhibition Ground, Brisbane

== See also ==
- List of South Africa national rugby union players – Springbok no. 328
