= Jean Dupuy (rugby union) =

France international rugby union player

- Born: Jean-Vincent Dupuy; 25 May 1934 Vic-en-Bigorre, France
- Died: 27 October 2010 (aged 76) Vic-en-Bigorre, France
- Height: 5 ft 9 in (1.75 m)
- Weight: 13 st 3 lb (84 kg)

Rugby union career
- Position: Wing
Amateur team(s)
Years	Team	Apps	(Points)
1953–1969	Stadoceste Tarbais		
- Correct as of October 27, 2010
International career
Years	Team	Apps	(Points)
1956–1964	France	40	(57)
- Correct as of 27 October 2010
Coaching career
- Years: Team
- Union Sportive Vicquoise

Jean Dupuy (25 May 1934, Vic-en-Bigorre-27 October 2010, same town) was a French rugby union footballer. He was a left-wing for Stadoceste Tarbais, where he debuted aged 19, and the French national side, gaining 40 caps, and scoring 19 tries. He was 1.75 m high and weighed 84 kg.

He consecutively won 4 Five Nations Championships (along with Michel Crauste, Alfred Roques, Jacky Bouquet and Henri Rancoule), in 1959, 1960 (along with England), 1961 and 1962.
