= Amédée Domenech =

France international rugby union player

- Born: 3 May 1933 Narbonne, France
- Died: 21 September 2003 (aged 70) Brive, France
- Height: 1.75 m (5 ft 9 in)
- Weight: 76 kg (168 lb)

Rugby union career
- Position: Prop
Amateur team(s)
Years	Team	Apps	(Points)
1953–1955	RC Vichy		
1955–1965	CA Brive		
International career
Years	Team	Apps	(Points)
1954–1963	France	52	(24)

Amédée Domenech (May 3, 1933, Narbonne – September 21, 2003 Brive-la-Gaillarde) was a French rugby union prop nicknamed Le Duc (the Duke) who played for RC Vichy between 1954 and 1955. After one year, he moved to CA Brive and helped the club to gain promotion to the first division. He earned his first cap with the French national team on 27 March 1954 against Wales at Cardiff. The Stade Amédée-Domenech in Brive-la-Gaillarde was named in his honour.

After his playing career, Domenech became a businessman and a politician. Most notably, he was a regional president of the Radical Party and a city councillor (conseiller municipal) in Brive-la-Gaillarde and Paris. He was also part of Edgar Faure's cabinet.

== Honours ==
- Selected to represent France, 1954–1963
- Five Nations 1954, 1955, 1960, 1961 and 1962.
- 1961 France rugby union tour of New Zealand and Australia
- 1960 France rugby union tour of Argentina and Uruguay
