= Butch Lochner =

South African rugby union player

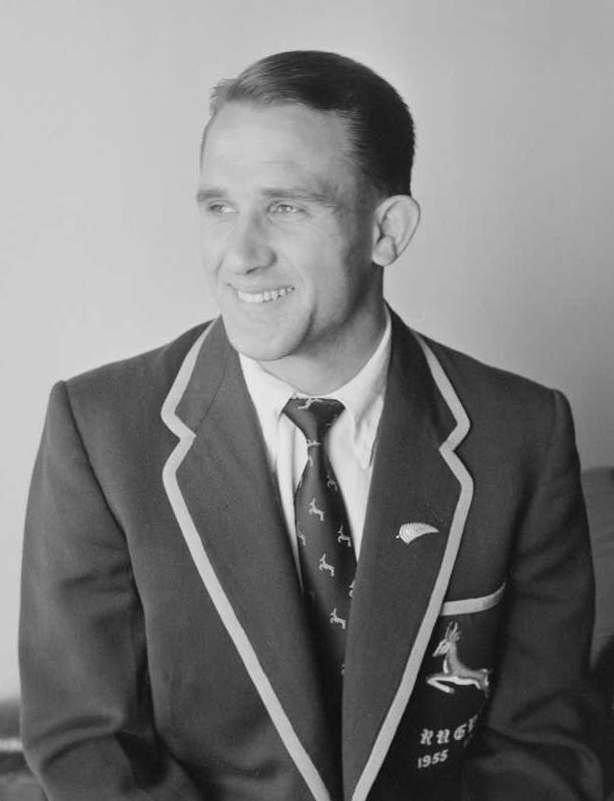
- Lochner in New Zealand in 1956
- Born: George Philippus Lochner; 1 February 1931 Stellenbosch, South Africa
- Died: 27 August 2010 (aged 79) Langebaan
- University: University of Stellenbosch
- Notable relative: Jan Lochner

Rugby union career
- Position: Number eight
Provincial / State sides
Years	Team	Apps	(Points)
1951–?	Western Province		
- Boland
- Correct as of 19 July 2010
International career
Years	Team	Apps	(Points)
1955–58	South Africa	9	(6)
- Correct as of 19 July 2010

George Philip "Butch" Lochner (1 February 1931 – 27 August 2010) was a South African international rugby union player. He made nine appearances for the Springboks between 1955 and 1958, mostly as a number eight. He also scored two tries during his international career, at a time when tries were worth three points. Lochner, who studied agriculture at the University of Stellenbosch, started playing provincial rugby with Western Province in 1951, before moving to Boland in 1954. He made his international debut for South Africa during the 3rd Test of the 1955 British Lions tour at the Loftus Versfeld Stadium, Pretoria. The match was won by the Lions, giving them a 2–1 lead in the four Test series. He was not selected for the 4th Lions Test, but was included in the squad for the 1956 tour of Australia and New Zealand. He played in all six of the tour Tests, including two victories over Australia. After Australia, the Springboks travelled to New Zealand to compete in a four Test Series. Following a loss in Dunedin and a win in Wellington, the series with the All Blacks was level going into the 3rd Test at Lancaster Park, Christchurch. Lochner, playing as a flanker, scored a try as South Africa lost the match 17–10. New Zealand went on to win the series 3–1. He then played in both Tests of France's 1958 tour. He scored a try in the opening match, a 3–3 draw at Newlands Stadium, Cape Town, before making his final appearance as a Springbok in the 2nd Test at Ellis Park, Johannesburg. France won the game to take the series 1–0.
