= Pieter-Steph du Toit =

South African rugby union player

- du Toit in Johannesburg, June 2026
- Full name: Pieter Stephanus du Toit
- Born: 20 August 1992 (age 34) Cape Town, South Africa
- Height: 2.00 m (6 ft 6 1/2 in)
- Weight: 115 kg (254 lb; 18 st 2 lb)
- School: Hoërskool Swartland, Malmesbury
- Notable relative(s): Piet du Toit (grandfather), Johan du Toit (brother)

Rugby union career
- Position: Lock / Flanker / Number 8
Youth career
- 2010: Boland Cavaliers
- 2011–2012: Sharks
Senior career
Years	Team	Apps	(Points)
2012–2015	Sharks (Currie Cup)	5	(0)
2012–2015	Sharks	32	(5)
2016–2021	Stormers	59	(20)
2022–2026	Toyota Verblitz	38	(15)
- Correct as of 27 December 2025
International career
Years	Team	Apps	(Points)
2012	South Africa Under-20	5	(5)
2013–	South Africa	102	(75)
- Correct as of 12 September 2026
Medal record
Men's Rugby union
Representing South Africa
Rugby World Cup
Bronze medal – third place	2015 England	Squad
Gold medal – first place	2019 Japan	Squad
Gold medal – first place	2023 France	Squad

Pieter Stephanus du Toit (born 20 August 1992) is a South African professional rugby union player who plays as a lock or flanker for the South Africa and Toyota Verblitz in Japan Rugby League One. A two-time recipient of the World Rugby Men's 15s Player of the Year award (2019 and 2024), he is regarded as one of the outstanding players of his generation. Du Toit was a key member of the Springboks' 2019 Rugby World Cup and 2023 World Cup-winning squads and was named man of the match in the 2023 final against New Zealand. Renowned for his stamina, defensive work rate, and tackling dominance, he is widely considered among the greatest players of all time.

== Early life ==
Du Toit was born in Cape Town to Pieter and Annelene du Toit. He grew up in the Riebeek Valley, where his family farmed on the historic Kloovenburg estate in Riebeek Kasteel. He attended Laerskool Riebeek Kasteel before moving to Hoërskool Swartland, where he played mostly as a second-row forward.

Du Toit is the latest in a long line of Pieter Stephanus du Toits, continuing a family naming tradition dating back to the 1820s. His grandfather, Pieter Stephanus du Toit, represented South Africa as a prop, earning 14 Test caps between 1958 and 1962 after debuting against France.

He is one of four brothers – Johan, Anton and Daniel. Johan du Toit became a professional rugby player, while Anton du Toit represented Maties in the Varsity Cup competition.

== Club career ==
=== Sharks ===
After finishing school at the end of 2010, Du Toit signed with the Sharks and joined the Sharks Academy, where he represented the franchise at Under-19 and Under-21 levels. He was named Best First Year Rugby Student at the Academy Awards in 2011.

Du Toit made his professional debut for the Sharks during the 2012 season, appearing off the bench in a Super Rugby match against the Chiefs after featuring earlier that year in the Vodacom Cup.

In July 2013, he signed a two-year contract extension with the franchise. He remained with the Sharks until his departure was formally announced in October 2015.

=== Stormers ===
Du Toit joined the Stormers ahead of the 2016 season, where he became a central figure in their Super Rugby squad. Du Toit never represented Western Province. He remained at the Cape franchise until 2021.

During this period he overcame two major injuries. In 2019 he suffered a torn ACL and successfully returned to play after undergoing surgery in which his father donated a tendon for the reconstruction.

In February 2020 he sustained a life-threatening leg injury during a Super Rugby match against the Blues at Newlands. A haematoma on his left thigh developed into acute compartment syndrome, requiring multiple surgeries and keeping him sidelined for more than a year.

=== Toyota Verblitz ===
Following the 2021 season, Du Toit signed with Toyota Verblitz in Japan's Japan Rugby League One.

== International career ==
Du Toit was a member of the South Africa Under-20 side that won the 2012 IRB Junior World Championship.

He made his senior Test debut for South Africa against Wales in Cardiff on 9 November 2013 at the age of 21. Du Toit featured at the 2015 Rugby World Cup, coming off the bench in the quarter-final victory over Wales at Twickenham Stadium.

He became a regular starter under head coach Allister Coetzee from 2016 onwards and captained the Springboks for the first time on 2 June 2018, becoming South Africa's 60th Test captain in a match against Wales.

From 2019 onwards Du Toit transitioned predominantly to the back row. He was selected for the 2019 Rugby World Cup, where South Africa defeated England in the final to claim their third world title. His performances throughout the year earned him the World Rugby Men's 15s Player of the Year award for 2019.

Du Toit was also part of the South African squad that won the Rugby Championship in 2019, 2024 and 2025.

In 2021 he featured in the Test series win over the British & Irish Lions, playing in the first two Tests before being ruled out of the series decider due to a shoulder injury sustained in the second Test. South Africa ultimately won the series 2–1.

At the 2023 Rugby World Cup, Du Toit produced one of the most celebrated performances of his career in the final against New Zealand, earning the Player of the Match award after making 28 tackles as South Africa secured back-to-back world titles. He was named World Rugby Player of the Year for a second time in 2024, becoming one of the few players to win the award more than once.

== Personal life ==
Du Toit is a Christian and is nicknamed the "Malmesbury Missile".

He is married to Willemien, and the couple have three children. His first-born son is also named Pieter Stephanus du Toit, continuing the family naming tradition that now spans eight generations.

His younger brother, Johan du Toit, was also a professional rugby player, and the two were teammates at the Sharks in 2014–2015 before later reuniting at the Stormers from 2017 until 2021.

== International statistics ==
=== Test match record ===
As of 15 November 2026

Against	P	W	D	L	Tri	Pts	%Won
Argentina	14	11	0	3	6	30	78.57
Australia	12	6	2	4	2	10	50
British & Irish Lions	2	1	0	1	0	0	50
England	9	6	0	3	1	5	66.67
France	9	7	0	2	0	0	77.78
Georgia	2	2	0	0	0	0	100
Ireland	9	4	0	5	2	10	44.44
Italy	5	4	0	1	0	0	80
Japan	3	2	0	1	0	0	66.67
New Zealand	21	10	1	10	2	10	47.62
Scotland	5	5	0	0	1	5	100
United States	1	1	0	0	0	0	100
Wales	12	7	0	5	1	5	58.33
Total	104	66	3	35	15	75	63.46

Pld = Games Played, W = Games Won, D = Games Drawn, L = Games Lost, Tri = Tries Scored, Pts = Points Scored

=== Test tries ===
Try	Opposition	Location	Venue	Competition	Date	Result	Score
1	Ireland	Cape Town, South Africa	Newlands	Test match	11 June 2016	Loss	20–26
2	Ireland	Johannesburg, South Africa	Ellis Park Stadium	Test match	18 June 2016	Win	32–26
3	Argentina	Salta, Argentina	Estadio Padre Ernesto Martearena	2016 Rugby Championship	27 August 2016	Loss	26–24
4	Argentina	Port Elizabeth, South Africa	Nelson Mandela Bay Stadium	2017 Rugby Championship	19 August 2017	Win	37–15
5	New Zealand	Yokohama, Japan	International Stadium Yokohama	2019 Rugby World Cup	21 September 2019	Loss	23–13
6	Australia	Pretoria, South Africa	Loftus Versfeld Stadium	2023 Rugby Championship	8 July 2023	Win	43–12
7	Wales	Cardiff, Wales	Millennium Stadium	2023 Rugby World Cup warm-up matches	19 August 2023	Win	52–16
8	Scotland	Marseille, France	Stade Vélodrome	2023 Rugby World Cup	10 September 2023	Win	18–3
9	Australia	Brisbane, Australia	Lang Park	2024 Rugby Championship	10 August 2024	Win	33-7
10	Argentina	Mbombela, South Africa	Mbombela Stadium	2024 Rugby Championship	28 September 2024	Win	48–7
11	Argentina	Mbombela, South Africa	Mbombela Stadium	2024 Rugby Championship	28 September 2024	Win	48–7
12	England	London, England	Twickenham Stadium	2024 end-of-year rugby union internationals	16 November 2024	Win	20–29
13	Argentina	Durban, South Africa	Kings Park Stadium	2025 Rugby Championship	27 September 2025	Win	67–30
14	Argentina	Durban, South Africa	Kings Park Stadium	2025 Rugby Championship	27 September 2025	Win	67–30
15	New Zealand	Baltimore, United States	M&T Bank Stadium	2026 New Zealand tour of South Africa	12 September 2026	Win	43–28

== Honours ==
South Africa

- Rugby World Cup:
  - Winner: 2019, 2023
- British & Irish Lions series:
  - Winner: 2021
- The Rugby Championship:
  - Winner: 2019, 2024, 2025
- IRB Junior World Championship:
  - Winner: 2012

Sharks

- Currie Cup:
  - Winner: 2013

Individual

- World Rugby Men's 15s Player of the Year:
  - 2019, 2024
- World Rugby Men's 15s Dream Team of the Year:
  - 2024
- South Africa Rugby Union Awards – Player of the Year:
  - 2016, 2018, 2019

== See also ==
- List of South Africa national rugby union players – Springbok no. 854

Rugby Union Captain
Preceded by Eben Etzebeth	Springbok Captain; 2017	Next: Siya Kolisi
