= Guy Stener =

France international rugby union player

- Born: 11 February 1931 Vichy, France
- Died: 12 December 1967 (aged 36) Vichy, France
- Height: 5 ft 10 in (178 cm)
- Weight: 170 lb (77 kg)

Rugby union career
- Position: Three–quarter
International career
Years	Team	Apps	(Points)
1956–58	France	5	(0)

Guy Stener (11 February 1931 – 12 December 1967) was a French international rugby union player.

Born in Vichy, Stener attended Cusset secondary school and was a football goalkeeper in his youth. He took up rugby on the urging of his friend Guy Ligier, who became a famous racing driver.

Stener, a three–quarter, played rugby for the Paris Université Club while studying for a physiotherapy degree and was also involved with his local club RC Vichy. He was capped five times for France, with three appearances in the 1956 Five Nations, then a further two on their 1958 tour of South Africa. Towards the end of his career, Stener had a stint in England with Harlequins during a hospital placement.

In 1967, Stener died of a long illness aged 36.

== See also ==
- List of France national rugby union players
