= Chris de Nysschen =

South African rugby union player

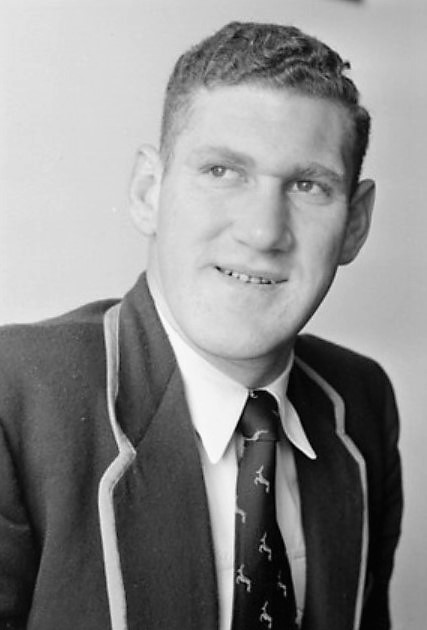
- De Nysschen in New Zealand in 1956
- Born: Christian Johannes de Nysschen; 31 January 1936 Ladysmith, Natal, Union of South Africa
- Died: 2 November 2016 (aged 80) Krugersdorp, South Africa
- Height: 1.99 m (6 ft 6 in)
- School: Ladysmith High School

Rugby union career
- Position: Lock
Provincial / State sides
Years	Team	Apps	(Points)
1955–1960	Natal	25	
International career
Years	Team	Apps	(Points)
1956	South Africa (tour)	10	(3)

Christian Johannes de Nysschen (31 January 1936 – 2 November 2016 ) was a South African rugby union player.

== Playing career ==
De Nysschen was born in Ladysmith and went to school, first in Bergville and later in Ladysmith, where he wrote matric at Ladysmith High School. As a 19 year old he made his debut for Natal and still 19, he became a Springbok.

De Nysschen toured with the Springboks to Australia and New Zealand in 1956. He did not play in any test matches, but did play in ten tour matches and scored one try.

== See also ==
- List of South Africa national rugby union players – Springbok no. 334
