= Johan du Toit =

South African rugby union player

- Full name: Johannes Willem du Toit
- Born: 8 September 1995 (age 31) Cape Town, South Africa
- Height: 1.93 m (6 ft 4 in)
- Weight: 108 kg (17 st 0 lb; 238 lb)
- School: Hoërskool Swartland, Malmesbury
- University: University of KwaZulu-Natal
- Notable relative(s): Piet du Toit (grandfather), Pieter-Steph du Toit (brother)

Rugby union career
- Position: Flanker / Lock
Youth career
- 2008–2013: Boland Cavaliers
- 2014–2016: Sharks
Amateur team(s)
Years	Team	Apps	(Points)
2015	UKZN Impi	3	(0)
Senior career
Years	Team	Apps	(Points)
2015–2016	Sharks XV	9	(5)
2017–2022	Stormers	15	(5)
2017–2022	Western Province	41	(35)
- Correct as of 16 September 2022

Johannes Willem du Toit (born 8 September 1995) is a South African rugby union player, who began his youth career with Swartland High-school for Boland before representing the Stormers in Super Rugby and Western Province in the Currie Cup as well as the Rugby Challenge. He has played as a flanker and a lock.

== Rugby career ==
=== 2008–2013: Schoolboy rugby ===
Du Toit was born in Cape Town, but grew up in the nearby Swartland area of the Western Cape. He was selected to represent his local Boland Cavaliers union at both the Under-13 Craven Week in 2008 and the Under-18 Craven Week in 2013.

=== 2017–present: Western Province ===
At the start of 2017, Du Toit moved to Cape Town, where he joined the Western Province Currie Cup team.

== Personal life ==
Du Toit is the younger brother of Pieter-Steph, also a professional rugby player that represented the South African national team since 2013. The two brothers were contracted to the Sharks at the same time (in 2014 and 2015) before reuniting at the Stormers from 2017 onwards.
