= Richard White (rugby union) =

NZ international rugby union player (1925–2012)

Tiny White QSO JP
- Born: Richard Alexander White; 11 June 1925 Gisborne, New Zealand
- Died: 10 March 2012 (aged 86) Gisborne, New Zealand
- Height: 1.88 m (6 ft 2 in)
- Weight: 101 kg (223 lb)
- School: Gisborne Boys' High School; Feilding Agricultural High School
- Notable relative: Chris White (son)

Rugby union career
- Position: Lock
Provincial / State sides
Years	Team	Apps	(Points)
1955–72	Poverty Bay	133	
International career
Years	Team	Apps	(Points)
1946–1957	New Zealand	23	(30)

Richard Alexander "Tiny" White QSO JP (11 June 1925 – 10 March 2012) was a New Zealand rugby union footballer. He played 23 tests and 55 games for the All Blacks.

== Early life ==
Richard Alexander White was educated at Gisborne Boys' High School and Feilding Agricultural High School. It was at school that he earned the ironic nickname "Tiny". White was regarded as tall by 1940s standards.

== Rugby career ==
Richard White played for Poverty Bay. He debuted for the All Blacks in 1949 by playing two tests against Australia and he immediately became an important player for them. He never missed a test match during his career and was only subbed off once in his career. White also played in thirty of the 36 games during the All Blacks 1953–54 New Zealand rugby union tour of Britain, Ireland, France and North America, the most of any player.

White was regarded as being excellent in the lineout. He was also very quick and had "incredible stamina." Terry McLean once remarked that he was "a wonderful player" who "played with matchless vigour, especially in the lineout."

White was forced to retire from rugby at age thirty-two after he received a kick in the back. This along with his farming injuries and an almost paralyzed left hand was too much for him to continue playing. His final game was during the 1956 tour by South Africa. The All Blacks won the series 3–1 which was their first ever victory against South Africa in a test series.

== Later life ==
White served as mayor of Gisborne from 1977 to 1983. He was also heavily involved in rugby, becoming president of the Poverty Bay Rugby Football Union and continuing to coach some local sides. In the 1999 New Year Honours, White was appointed a Companion of the Queen's Service Order for public services.

White died in Gisborne on 10 March 2012. The rower Chris White is his son.
