= Pierre Dizabo =

France international rugby union player

- Born: 4 October 1929 Saint-Vincent-de-Tyrosse, France
- Died: 24 January 2002 (aged 72) Bayonne, France
- Height: 5 ft 9 in (175 cm)
- Weight: 177 lb (80 kg)

Rugby union career
- Position: Centre / Fly-half
International career
Years	Team	Apps	(Points)
1948–60	France	14	(6)

Pierre Dizabo (4 October 1929 – 24 January 2002) was a French international rugby union player.

Dizabo was born in Saint-Vincent-de-Tyrosse and played mainly for his local club US Tyrosse.

A versatile back, Dizabo had an unusual international career, which he began as a centre. He debuted in France's win over the Wallabies at Colombes in 1948 and remained in the side for three successive Five Nations campaigns from 1948 to 1950. After a record 10 year absence, Dizabo was called by France as a fly–half on their 1960 tour of Argentina.

Dizabo finished his career with CA Bègles.

== See also ==
- List of France national rugby union players
