= Piet du Toit =

South African rugby union player (1935–1996)

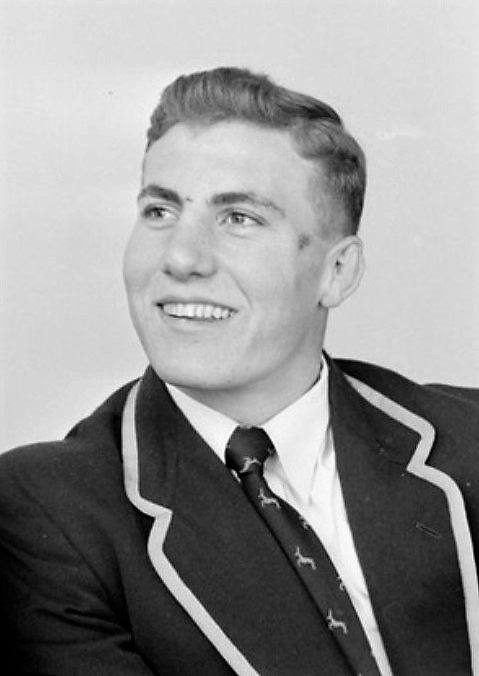
- Du Toit in New Zealand in 1956
- Born: Pieter Stephanus du Toit; 9 October 1935 Petrusville, Union of South Africa
- Died: 26 February 1996 (aged 60) Hermanus, Western Cape, South Africa
- Height: 1.85 m (6 ft 1 in)
- Weight: 95 kg (209 lb)
- School: Paarl Boys' High School
- University: University of Stellenbosch
- Notable relative(s): Pieter-Steph du Toit (grandson), Johan du Toit (grandson)

Rugby union career
Amateur team(s)
| Years | Team | Apps | (Points) |
| 1953–1958 | Maties | | |
| 1958–1963 | Malmesbury RFC | | |
Provincial / State sides
| Years | Team | Apps | (Points) |
| 1956–1958 | Western Province | | |
| 1958–1963 | Boland | | |
International career
| Years | Team | Apps | (Points) |
| 1958–1961 | South Africa | 14 | (0) |

Pieter Stephanus "Piet" du Toit, (9 October 1935 – 26 February 1996) was a South African rugby international. He played as a prop. Due to his relative small stature and light weight for a prop, but still being a strong scrummager, he was known as Piet "Spiere" du Toit. Spiere is the Afrikaans word for "muscles".

== Career ==
As a student at the University of Stellenbosch, du Toit made his senior provincial debut for Western Province in 1956 and toured with the Springboks in New Zealand and Australia in 1956. In 1958 he started farming and joined the Malmesbury RFC and continued his provincial career at Boland. He then also made his Test debut for the Springboks as a Boland player.

He played his first test match on 26 July 1958 against France in a historic series for les Bleus. He was later chosen for a series of four matches against the All Blacks, and helped the Springboks to two wins, one draw, and one defeat.

In 1960–61 he was selected for five games with the Springboks, who embarked on a tour of Europe. He helped beat Wales 3–0. He also participated in victories against Ireland 8–3 as well as over England 5-0 and Scotland 12–5. On 18 February 1961 the South Africans drew in Paris 0–0.

Piet du Toit also took part in three victories over the Irish and Australia in 1961 to end his international career.

=== Test history ===
| No. | Opponents | Results (SA 1st) | Position | Tries | Dates | Venue |
|---|---|---|---|---|---|---|
| 1. | France | 3–3 | Tighthead prop | | 26 Jul 1958 | Newlands, Cape Town |
| 2. | France | 5–9 | Tighthead prop | | 16 Aug 1958 | Ellis Park, Johannesburg |
| 3. | New Zealand | 13–0 | Tighthead prop | | 25 Jun 1960 | Ellis Park, Johannesburg |
| 4. | New Zealand | 3–11 | Tighthead prop | | 23 Jul 1960 | Newlands, Cape Town |
| 5. | New Zealand | 11–11 | Tighthead prop | | 13 Aug 1960 | Free State Stadium, Bloemfontein |
| 6. | New Zealand | 8–3 | Tighthead prop | | 27 Aug 1960 | Boet Erasmus Stadium, Port Elizabeth |
| 7. | Wales | 3–0 | Tighthead prop | | 3 Dec 1960 | Cardiff Arms Park, Cardiff |
| 8. | Ireland | 8–3 | Tighthead prop | | 17 Dec 1960 | Lansdowne Road, Dublin |
| 9. | England | 5–0 | Tighthead prop | | 07 Jan 1961 | Twickenham, London |
| 10. | Scotland | 12–5 | Tighthead prop | | 21 Jan 1961 | Murrayfield, Edinburgh |
| 11. | France | 0–0 | Tighthead prop | | 18 Feb 1961 | Colombes Stadium, Paris |
| 12. | Ireland | 24–8 | Tighthead prop | | 13 May 1961 | Newlands, Cape Town |
| 13. | Australia | 28–3 | Tighthead prop | | 5 Aug 1961 | Ellis Park, Johannesburg |
| 14. | Australia | 23–11 | Tighthead prop | | 12 Aug 1961 | Boet Erasmus Stadium, Port Elizabeth |

== Personal life ==
Piet completed his schooling at Paarl Boys' High School. Du Toit graduated from the University of Stellenbosch with a B. Comm degree. In 1957, Piet du Toit and his wife Barbara, a teacher, started farming on the Kloovenburg Wine Estate near Riebeek Kasteel, Western Cape which his father and father in law bought in 1956. Piet retired in 1989 and his son, Pieter du Toit, still farms on this estate. Two of his grandsons, Johan du Toit and Pieter-Steph du Toit, also plays professional rugby. Pieter-Steph has already followed in his grandfather's footsteps by becoming a Springbok.

== See also ==
- List of South Africa national rugby union players – Springbok no. 332
