= Bennett Howe =

South African cricketer

Peewee Howe
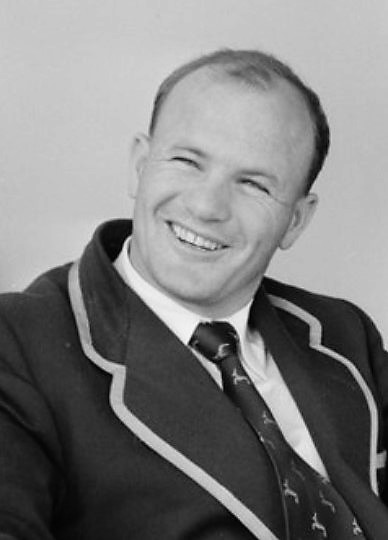
- Howe in New Zealand in 1956
- Born: Bennett Frederick Howe; 30 August 1932 Port Nolloth, South Africa
- Died: 22 April 2010 (aged 77) Port Elizabeth, South Africa
- Height: 1.74 m (5 ft 9 in)
- Weight: 70 kg (154 lb)
- School: Dale College

Rugby union career
- Position(s): Flyhalf, Centre
Amateur team(s)
Years	Team	Apps	(Points)
- Hamiltons, East London
Provincial / State sides
Years	Team	Apps	(Points)
1951–1960	Border		
International career
Years	Team	Apps	(Points)
1956	South Africa	2	(3)
- Cricket career

Cricket information
- Batting: Right-handed
- Bowling: Right arm medium

Domestic team information
- Years: Team
- 1955/56: Border
- Source: Cricinfo

Bennett Frederick "Peewee" Howe (30 August 1932 – 22 April 2010) was a South African rugby union player and first-class cricketer. He played in two first-class matches for Border in 1955/56.

== Rugby union career ==
Howe was born in Port Nolloth in Natal and attended Dale College Boys' High School in the Eastern Cape.

Howe made his provincial debut for Border in 1951 and played flyhalf and centre for the union. He toured with the Springboks to Australia and New Zealand in 1956. He played in the first and last test matches against New Zealand, scoring a try on test debut.

=== Test history ===
No.	Opponents	Results (SA 1st)	Position	Tries	Dates	Venue
1.	New Zealand	6–10	Centre	1	14 Jul 1956	Carisbrook, Dunedin
2.	New Zealand	5–11	Flyhalf		1 Sep 1956	Eden Park, Auckland

== See also ==
- List of South Africa national rugby union players – Springbok no. 330
- List of Border representative cricketers
