= Ron Jarden =

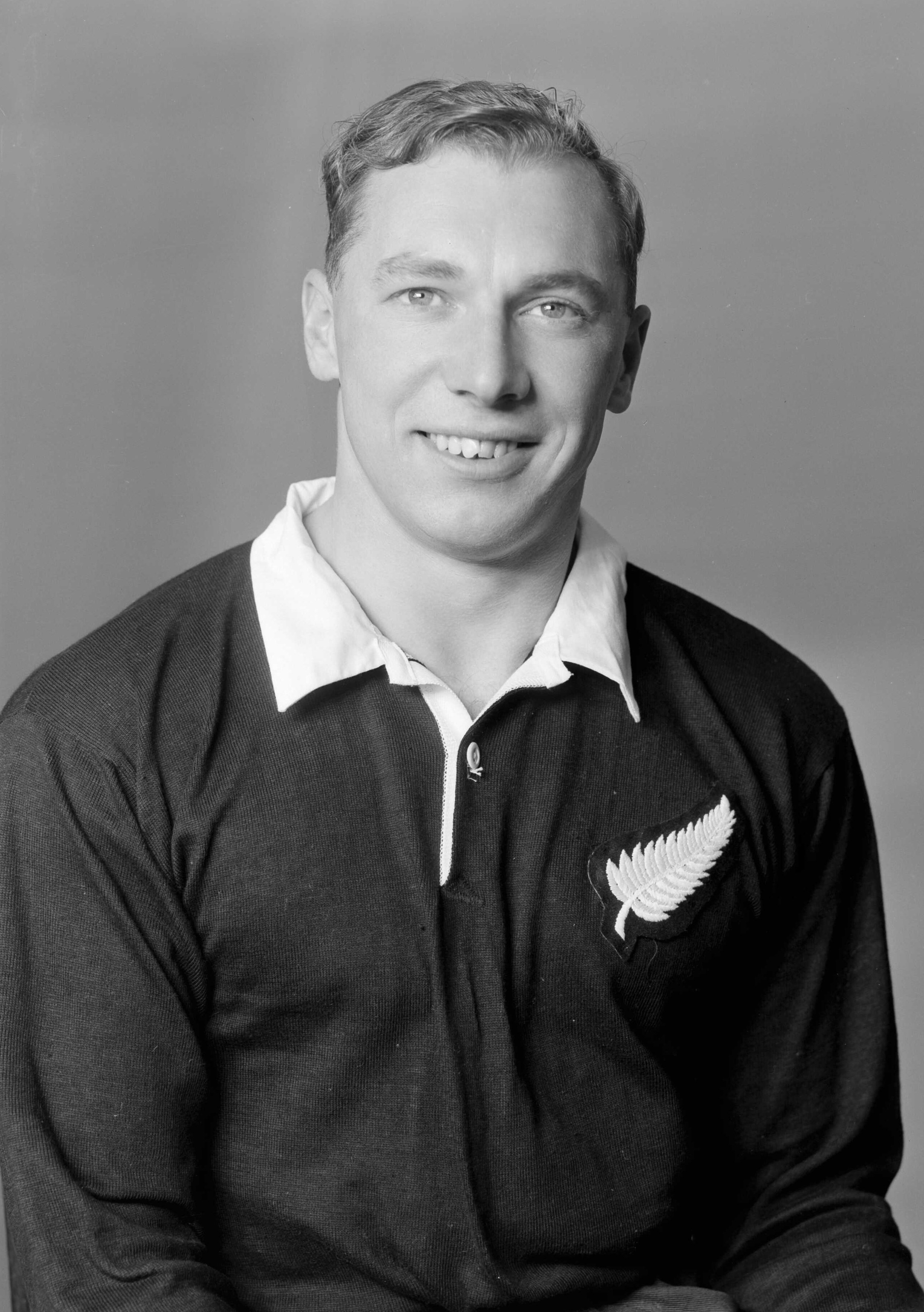
- Jarden, c. 1951-56
- Born: Ronald Alexander Jarden; 14 December 1929 Lower Hutt, New Zealand
- Died: 18 February 1977 (aged 47) Lower Hutt, New Zealand
- Height: 1.73 m (5 ft 8 in)
- Weight: 81 kg (12 st 11 lb)
- School: Hutt Valley High School
- University: Victoria University

Rugby union career
- Position: Wing
Amateur team(s)
Years	Team	Apps	(Points)
- Victoria University
- Correct as of 2007-08-31
International career
Years	Team	Apps	(Points)
1951–1956	All Blacks	16	(42)
- Correct as of 2007-08-31

Ronald Alexander Jarden (born 14 December 1929, Lower Hutt, New Zealand and died 18 February 1977, Lower Hutt), better known as Ron Jarden, was a New Zealand rugby union footballer, businessman, and sharebroker.

== Career ==
=== Rugby career ===
Jarden played club rugby for Victoria University in 1949, and was selected to play provincial rugby for Wellington (on the wing) that year. He practised daily at goal-kicking and also lineout throwing (which was performed by wingers in those days). He was selected for the North Island team in 1950 and then the All Blacks in 1951. He played 16 Tests and 21 other matches for the All Blacks before retiring in 1956 following the tour of the South African team. He was voted New Zealand Sportsman of the year in 1951.

=== Business career ===
He had graduated from Victoria with a Bachelor of Arts in 1953, and his retirement from rugby in 1956 was to concentrate on his business career with Shell. He was very successful in business and eventually started his own stockbroking firm RA Jarden & Co, which is now Jarden Securities Limited, New Zealand's largest investment bank. He was appointed chairman of the Broadcasting Council which governed New Zealand's broadcasting system in 1975.

Jarden died on 18 February 1977 from a heart attack. In 2008, he was posthumously inducted into the New Zealand Business Hall of Fame.
