= Chris de Wilzem =

South African rugby union player

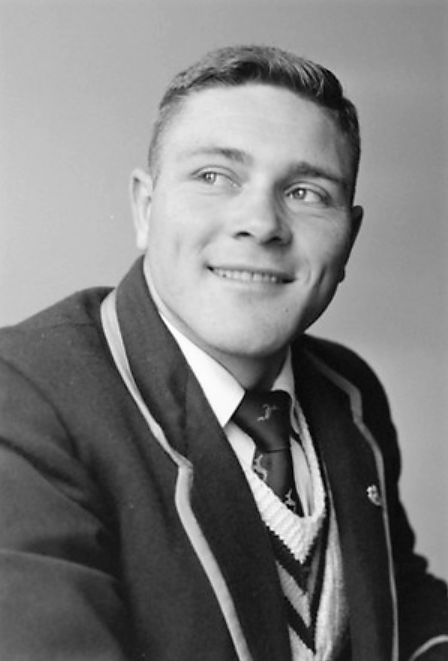
- De Wilzem in New Zealand in 1956
- Born: Christian Johannes de Wilzem; 14 October 1932 Queenstown, Union of South Africa
- Died: 6 March 2006 (aged 73) Hartbeespoort, South Africa
- School: Hoërskool Hangklip, Queenstown
- University: University of the Free State

Rugby union career
- Position: Flank
Provincial / State sides
Years	Team	Apps	(Points)
1955–1965	Free State	55	
1957	Northern Transvaal	3	
International career
Years	Team	Apps	(Points)
1956	South Africa (tour)	16	(3)

Christian Johannes de Wilzem (14 October 1932 – 6 March 2006) was a South African rugby union player.

== Playing career ==
De Wilzem was born and raised in Queenstown. After school he enrolled at the University of the Free State and played provincial rugby for Free State. He played 55 matches for the Free State and captained the team on five occasions. In 1957 he spent a year in Pretoria and also played three matches for Northern Transvaal.

De Wilzem toured with the Springboks to Australia and New Zealand in 1956. He did not play in any test matches, but did play in 16 tour matches and scored one try.

== See also ==
- List of South Africa national rugby union players – Springbok no. 335
