= Coenraad Frederik Strydom =

South African rugby union player

Popeye Strydom
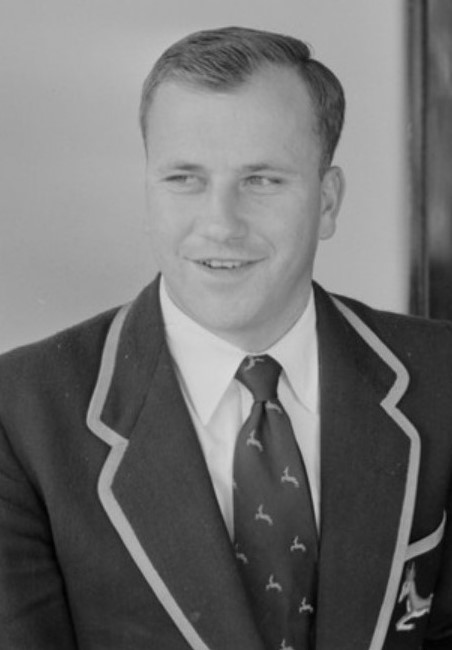
- Strydom in New Zealand in 1956
- Born: Coenraad Frederik Strydom; 20 January 1932 Kareedouw, South Africa
- Died: 31 March 2001 (aged 69) Randburg, South Africa
- School: Grey College

Rugby union career
- Position: Scrum-half
Provincial / State sides
Years	Team	Apps	(Points)
1952–61	Orange Free State	74	
- Correct as of 19 July 2010
International career
Years	Team	Apps	(Points)
1955–58	South Africa	6	(0)
- Correct as of 19 July 2010

Coenraad Frederik "Popeye" Strydom (25 January 1932 – 31 March 2001) was a South Africa national rugby union team player. In all, Strydom made six appearances for the Springboks between 1955 and 1958.

His rugby nickname, Popeye, was often cited together with other colourful nicknames such as those of Piston van Wyk, Klippies Kritzinger, and Hempies du Toit.

== Early life ==
Strydom was born in Kareedouw, South Africa and educated at Grey College.

== Career ==
He started playing provincial rugby with Orange Free State in 1952, and would later play for Eastern Province. Strydom also played baseball for these provinces.

Strydom made his international debut as a scrum-half for the Springboks against the British and Irish Lions in their 1955 tour. Strydom's sole appearance in the four-match series came in the third test match in Pretoria — a match that South Africa lost 9–6. His next appearance for the Springboks came on the 1956 tour of Australia and New Zealand. Strydom took part in the first two Tests of the tour, a pair of victories over Australia in Sydney and Brisbane.

After winning the two test series against Australia, the Springboks travelled to New Zealand to compete in four tests. Strydom was selected to play in the first test, which was won by the All Blacks at Carisbrook, Dunedin. He was not selected again until the fourth test in Auckland, at which point the All Blacks held a 2–1 series lead. New Zealand, in front of 61,240 at Eden Park, won the game 11–5 to take the series.

Strydom played his final match for South Africa in the first test of France's 1958 tour at Newlands Stadium, Cape Town. The game ended in a 3–3 draw.

== Personal ==
Outside of rugby, Strydom worked as a building society clerk.

Strydom had a stroke in March 2001, after which he slipped into a coma. A few days later he died, at the age of 69, in Randburg. He was survived by his wife, June, and son, Anton.
