= 1956 South Africa rugby union tour of Australia and New Zealand =

Summary
P	W	D	L
Total
29	21	1	7
Test match
6	3	0	3
Opponent
P	W	D	L
Australia
2	2	0	0
New Zealand
4	1	0	3

The 1956 South Africa rugby union tour of Australia and New Zealand, more commonly known in New Zealand as the 1956 Springboks tour was a series of rugby union matches played by South Africa in Australia and New Zealand. The Springboks won 21 matches of 29, drew 1, and lost 7. They played 6 Test matches, with two victories over Australia and one over New Zealand. The New Zealand leg of their trip was the primary focus of the tour—23 of their 29 matches were in New Zealand, which included a four Test match series against New Zealand.

== Matches in Australia ==
Scores and results list South Africa's points tally first.

Match	Date	Opponent	Location	Result	Score
1	15 May	Australian Capital Territory	Canberra	Won	41–6
2	19 May	New South Wales	Sydney	Won	29–9
3	22 May	New South Wales Country	Tamworth	Won	15–8
4	26 May	Australia	SCG, Sydney	Won	9–0
5	29 May	Queensland	Brisbane	Won	47–3
6	2 June	Australia	Exhibition Ground, Brisbane	Won	9–0

== Matches in New Zealand ==
Scores and results list South Africa's points tally first.

Match	Date	Opponent	Location	Result	Score
7	9 June	Waikato	Rugby Park, Hamilton	Lost	10–14
8	13 June	North Auckland	Okara Park, Whangārei	Won	3–0
9	16 June	Auckland	Eden Park, Auckland	Won	6–3
10	20 June	Manawatu / Horowhenua	Showgrounds, Palmerston North	Won	14–3
11	23 June	Wellington	Athletic Park, Wellington	Won	8–6
12	27 June	Poverty Bay / East Coast	Rugby Park, Gisborne	Won	22–0
13	30 June	Hawke's Bay	McLean Park, Napier	Won	20–8
14	4 July	Nelson / Marlborough / Golden Bay-Motueka	Trafalgar Park, Nelson	Won	41–3
15	7 July	Otago	Carisbrook, Dunedin	Won	14–9
16	14 July	New Zealand	Carisbrook, Dunedin	Lost	6–10
17	18 July	South Canterbury / Mid Canterbury / North Otago	Fraser Park, Timaru	Won	20–8
18	21 July	Canterbury	Lancaster Park, Christchurch	Lost	6–9
19	25 July	West Coast-Buller	Victoria Square, Westport	Won	27–6
20	28 July	Southland	Rugby Park, Invercargill	Won	23–12
21	31 July	Wairarapa / Bush	Solway Park, Masterton	Won	19–8
22	4 August	New Zealand	Athletic Park, Wellington	Won	8–3
23	8 August	Wanganui / King Country	Spriggins Park, Wanganui	Won	36–16
24	11 August	Taranaki	Rugby Park, New Plymouth	Drew	3–3
25	18 August	New Zealand	Lancaster Park, Christchurch	Lost	10–17
26	22 August	New Zealand Universities	Athletic Park, Wellington	Lost	15–22
27	25 August	New Zealand Maori	Eden Park, Auckland	Won	37–0
28	28 August	Bay of Plenty / Thames Valley	A & P Showgrounds, Rotorua	Won	17–6
29	1 September	New Zealand	Eden Park, Auckland	Lost	5–11

== Test Matches ==
=== Australia first Test ===
26 May 1956

Australia	0–9	South Africa
		(3 – 1t) Retief (3 – 1t) Nel (3 – 1pg) Viviers

Sydney Cricket Ground, Sydney
Attendance: 36,000
Referee: (Australia) R. Vanderfield

=== Australia second Test ===
2 June 1956

Australia	0–9	South Africa
		(3 – 1t) Retief (3 – 1t) Dryburgh (3 – 1dg) van Vollenhoven

Brisbane Exhibition Ground, Brisbane
Attendance: 22,000
Referee: (Australia) T. Moore

=== New Zealand first Test ===
14 July 1956

New Zealand	10–6	South Africa
Jarden (3 – 1t); White (3 – 1t); Jarden (4 – 2c)		(3 – 1t) Howe (3 – 1pg) Dryburgh

Carisbrook, Dunedin
Attendance: 40,000
Referee: (New Zealand) F. G. M. Parkinson

=== New Zealand second Test ===
4 August 1956

New Zealand	3–8	South Africa
Brown (3 – 1t)		(3 – 1t) du Rand (3 – 1t) Retief (2 – 1c) Viviers

Athletic Park, Wellington
Attendance: 50,000
Referee: (New Zealand) F. G. M. Parkinson

=== New Zealand third Test ===
18 August 1956

New Zealand	17–10	South Africa
Dixon (3 – 1t); Jarden (3 – 1t); White (3 – 1t); Clarke (8 – 1c, 2pg)		(3 – 1t) Lochner (3 – 1t) Rosenberg (4 – 2c) Viviers

Lancaster Park, Christchurch
Attendance: 51,000
Referee: (New Zealand) W. H. Fright

=== New Zealand fourth Test ===
1 September 1956

New Zealand	11–5	South Africa
Jones (3 – 1t); Clarke (8 – 1c, 2pg)		(3 – 1t) Dryburgh (2 – 1c) Viviers

Eden Park, Auckland
Attendance: 62,240
Referee: (New Zealand) W. H. Fright

== Squad ==
- Manager: D.H. Craven
- Assistant Manager: D. de Villiers
- Captain: S.S. Viviers No Caps (Orange Free State)
- Vice-Captain: J. du Rand 15 Caps (Northern Transvaal)

Position	Name	Caps	Club
Full Back	J.U. Buchler	9	Transvaal
Full Back	S.S. Viviers Captain	0	Orange Free State
Three-Quarter	K.T. van Vollenhoven	4	Northern Transvaal
Three-Quarter	P.G. Johnstone	5	Transvaal
Three-Quarter	R.G. Dryburgh	3	Natal
Three-Quarter	J. du Preez	0	Western Province
Three-Quarter	W. Rosenberg	3	Transvaal
Three-Quarter	P.E. Montini	0	Western Province
Three-Quarter	A.I. Kirkpatrick	1	Griqualand West
Three-Quarter	J.J. Nel	0	Western Province
Half-Back	C.A. Ulyate	3	Transvaal
Half-Back	B.F. Howe	0	Border
Half-Back	B.D. Pfaff	0	Western Province
Half-Back	T.A. Gentles	3	Western Province
Half-Back	C.F. Strydom	1	Orange Free State
Forward	H.P.J. Bekker	9	Northern Transvaal
Forward	A.C. Koch	15	Boland
Forward	P.S. du Toit	0	Western Province
Forward	H.N. Walker	1	Western Transvaal
Forward	A.J. van der Merwe	3	Boland
Forward	M. Hanekom	0	Boland
Forward	J. du Rand Vice-Captain	15	Northern Transvaal
Forward	J.T. Claassen	4	Western Transvaal
Forward	C.J. de Nysschen	0	Natal
Forward	J.A.J Pickard	2	Western Province
Forward	C.J. van Wyk	10	Transvaal
Forward	D.S.P. Ackermann	3	Western Province
Forward	C.J de Wilzem	0	Orange Free State
Forward	G.P. Lochner	1	Western Province
Forward	D.F. Retief	3	Northern Transvaal
