= Johan Steenekamp =

South African rugby union player

- Born: 2 September 1935 Alberton, South Africa
- Died: 16 August 2007 (aged 71)
- Height: 1.92 m (6 ft 4 in)
- Weight: 108 kg (238 lb)

Rugby union career
- Position: Lock
Provincial / State sides
Years	Team	Apps	(Points)
1954–65	Transvaal	60	(183)
International career
Years	Team	Apps	(Points)
1958	South Africa	1	(0)

Johan Steenekamp (2 September 1935 – 16 August 2007) was a South African international rugby union player.

Steenekamp was born in Alberton and educated at Hoërskool Voortrekker.

A goal–kicking lock forward, Steenekamp made his representative debut for Transvaal in 1954. He gained a Springboks cap in 1958, taking the place of Salty du Rand for a Test match against France at Newlands, which finished in a 3–3 draw. The Springboks selectors then made a series of changes for the second Test match and Steenekamp was displaced by Jan Pickard. He ascended to the Transvaal captaincy in 1959.

Steenekamp was a diamond polisher by profession.

== See also ==
- List of South Africa national rugby union players
