= Jeremy Nel =

South African rugby union player (1934–2023)

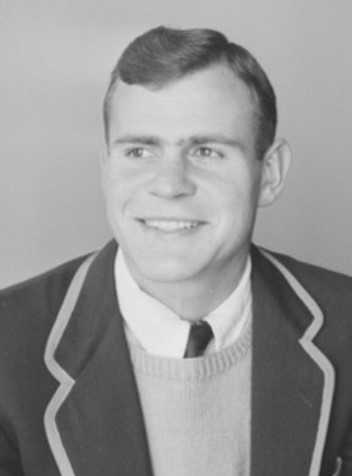
- Nel in New Zealand in 1956
- Born: Jeremy John Nel; 21 September 1934 Louis Trichardt, Transvaal
- Died: 25 June 2023 (aged 88)
- Height: 1.86 m (6 ft 1 in)
- Weight: 86 kg (190 lb)
- School: Potchefstroom High School for Boys
- University: Stellenbosch University

Rugby union career
- Position(s): Centre, Flyhalf
Provincial / State sides
Years	Team	Apps	(Points)
1952	Western Transvaal		
1953	Eastern Province		
1955–1956	Western Province		
1957	Boland		
1958	Transvaal		
1962–1963	Free State		
International career
Years	Team	Apps	(Points)
1956–1958	South Africa	8	(3)

Jeremy John Nel (21 September 1934 – 25 June 2023) was a South African rugby union player.

== Playing career ==
Nel matriculated in Potchefstroom and while he was still at school and at the age of seventeen, he made his senior provincial debut for Western Transvaal. After school he went to Rhodes University where he spend a year and played for Eastern Province. After his year at Rhodes he moved to Stellenbosch University and in 1955 was selected for Western Province. Nel also played provincial rugby for Boland, Transvaal and the Free State, thus for six provincial teams, which was a record for the time.

Nel toured with the Springboks to Australia and New Zealand in 1956. He played in all six test matches during the tour with his debut against Australia at the Sydney Cricket Ground, scoring a try on debut. In 1958 he played two test matches against France. Nel played eight test matches and fifteen tour matches for the Springboks, scoring one test try and also twenty nine points in tour matches, including 8 tries. Nel died on June 25, 2023 at the age of 88.

=== Test history ===
No.	Opponents	Results (SA 1st)	Position	Tries	Dates	Venue
1.	Australia	9–0	Centre	1	26 May 1956	Sydney Cricket Ground, Sydney
2.	Australia	9–0	Centre		2 Jun 1956	Brisbane Exhibition Ground, Brisbane
3.	New Zealand	6–10	Centre		14 Jul 1956	Carisbrook, Dunedin
4.	New Zealand	8–3	Centre		4 Aug 1956	Athletic Park, Wellington
5.	New Zealand	10–17	Centre		18 Aug 1956	Lancaster Park, Christchurch
6.	New Zealand	5–11	Centre		1 Sep 1956	Eden Park, Auckland
7.	France	3–3	Centre		26 Jul 1958	Newlands, Cape Town
8.	France	5–9	Flyhalf		16 Aug 1958	Ellis Park, Johannesburg

== See also ==
- List of South Africa national rugby union players – Springbok no. 329
