= Mickey Gerber =

South African rugby union player

- Full name: Michael Coenraad Gerber
- Born: 12 October 1935 Port Elizabeth, South Africa
- Died: 7 October 2005 (aged 69) Johannesburg, South Africa
- Height: 1.80 m (5 ft 11 in)
- Weight: 72.6 kg (160 lb)
- Occupation: Accountant

Rugby union career
- Position: Fullback
Provincial / State sides
Years	Team	Apps	(Points)
- Eastern Province
- Transvaal
International career
Years	Team	Apps	(Points)
1958–60	South Africa	3	(8)

Michael Coenraad Gerber (12 October 1935 – 7 October 2005) was a South African international rugby union player.

Born in Port Elizabeth, Gerber was the son of former Eastern Province player Peter Gerber and attended Grey High School, where he never got an opportunity to play on their first XV, having matriculated at the age of 16.

Gerber, an attacking fullback, played his early rugby for Port Elizabeth club Olympic and was representing Eastern Province at the time of his first Springboks call up for two home Test matches against France in 1958. He moved on to Wanderers soon after and gained his third and final Springboks cap via Transvaal in 1960, playing against Scotland at Boet Erasmus Stadium. The Springboks turned to Lionel Wilson to play fullback thereafter, but Gerber continued to represent Transvaal and captained the province for several seasons. He also coached Transvaal to a Currie Cup title in 1972.

When Nick Mallett was Springboks coach, Gerber served a stint as a national selector.

Gerber died of bone marrow cancer in 2005.

== See also ==
- List of South Africa national rugby union players
