= Cazes-Mondenard =

- Commune
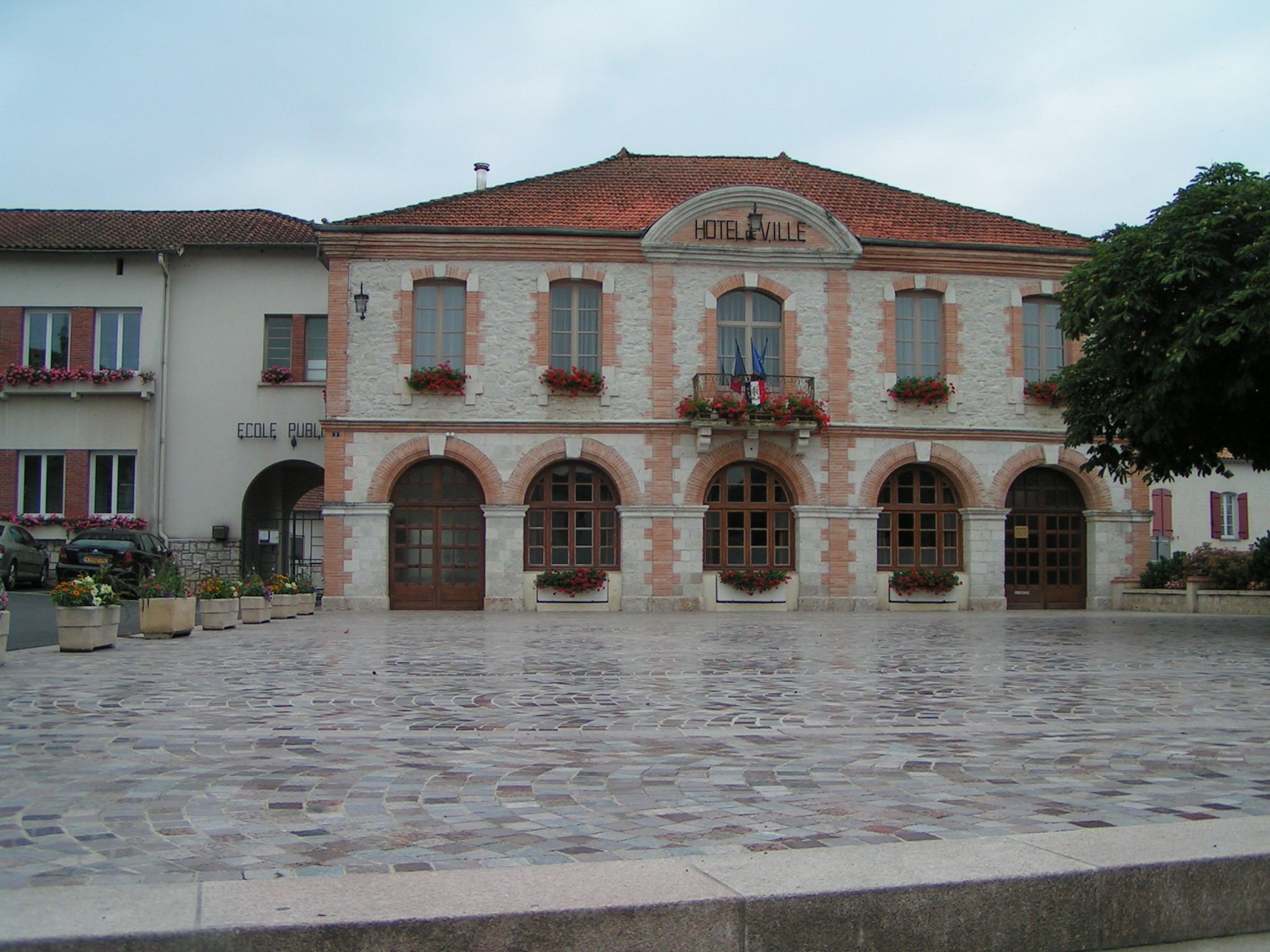
- Cazes-Mondenard town hall

- Coat of arms
- Location of Cazes-Mondenard
- Location within France Location within Occitanie
- Coordinates: 44°13′40″N 1°12′11″E
- Country: France
- Region: Occitania
- Department: Tarn-et-Garonne
- Arrondissement: Castelsarrasin
- Canton: Pays de Serres Sud-Quercy

Government
  - Mayor (2020–2026): Jean-Jacques Descouls
- Area^{1}: 58.23 km^{2} (22.48 sq mi)
- Elevation: 143 m (469 ft)
- Highest elevation: 253 m (830 ft)
- Lowest elevation: 93 m (305 ft)
- Population (2023): 1,238
  - Density: 21.26/km^{2} (55.06/sq mi)
- Time zone: UTC+01:00 (CET)
  - Summer (DST): UTC+02:00 (CEST)
- INSEE/Postal code: 82042 /82110
- ^{1} French Land Register data, which excludes lakes, ponds, glaciers > 1 km^{2} (0.386 sq mi or 247 acres) and river estuaries.

Cazes-Mondenard (French pronunciation: [kaz mɔ̃dnaʁ]; Occitan: Cases e Montdenard) is a commune in the Tarn-et-Garonne department in the Occitanie region in southern France.

== Geography ==
The Barguelonne flows southwestward through the northern part of the commune.

== See also ==
- Communes of the Tarn-et-Garonne department
