= Pierre Danos =

French rugby union player (1929–2023)

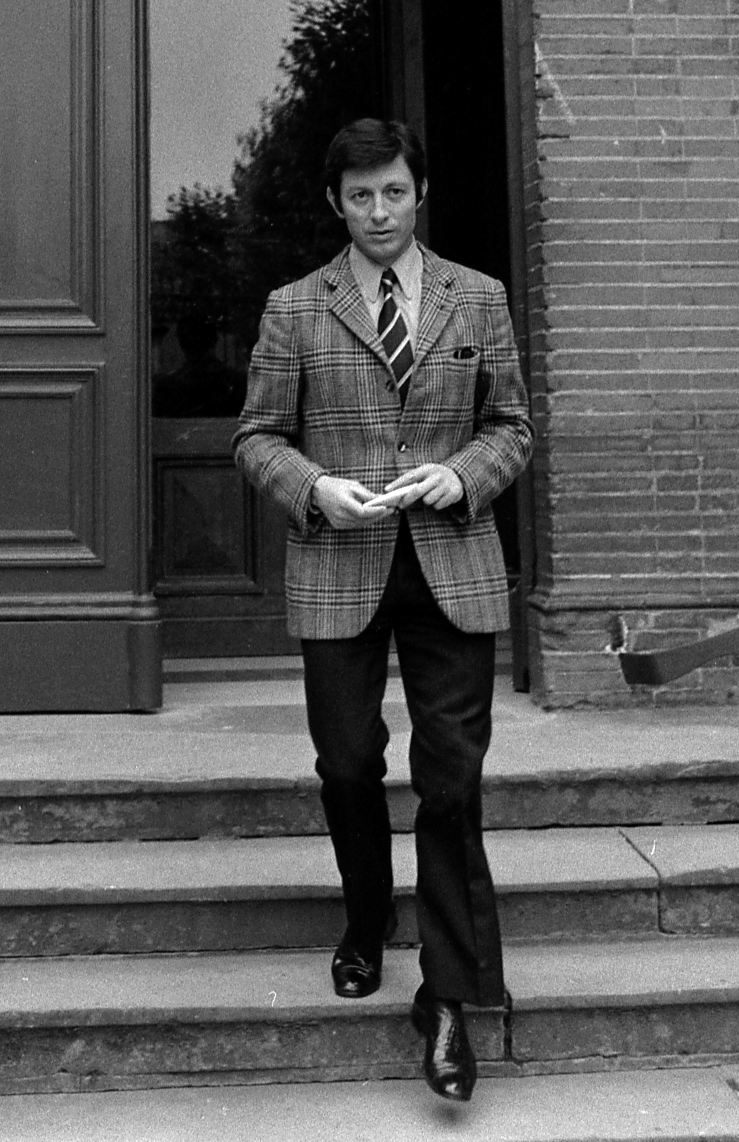
- Danos in 1971
- Born: 4 June 1929 Toulouse, France
- Died: 16 January 2023 (aged 93) Béziers, France
- Height: 1.75 m (5 ft 9 in)
- Weight: 76 kg (168 lb)

Rugby union career
- Position: Scrum-half
Amateur team(s)
Years	Team	Apps	(Points)
- RC Toulon
–	AS Béziers		
International career
Years	Team	Apps	(Points)
1954–1960	France	17	(15)

Pierre Danos (4 June 1929 – 16 January 2023) was a French rugby player, who played for AS Béziers which he won one title of French Champion, in 1961 and one Challenge Yves du Manoir. He earned his first cap with the French national team on 29 July 1954 against Argentina at Buenos Aires. He was called for the 1958 France rugby union tour of South Africa.

Danos died on 16 January 2023, at the age of 93.

== Honours ==
- Selected to represent France, 1954–1960
  - 1958 France rugby union tour of South Africa
  - Five Nations 1959
- AS Béziers
  - French rugby champion, 1961
  - Challenge Yves du Manoir 1964
  - French championship finalist 1960, 1962 and 1964
  - European Champion Clubs' Cup (organized by the FIRA) 1962
