= Lofty Fourie =

South African rugby union player

- Full name: Willem Loftie Fourie
- Born: 23 July 1936 Oudtshoorn, South Africa
- Died: 23 July 2001 (aged 65)
- Height: 1.82 m (6 ft 0 in)
- Weight: 93.0 kg (205 lb)

Rugby union career
- Position: Wing three–quarter
Provincial / State sides
Years	Team	Apps	(Points)
- South West Africa
International career
Years	Team	Apps	(Points)
1958	South Africa	2	(3)

Willem Loftie Fourie (23 July 1936 – 23 July 2001) was a South African international rugby union player.

Fourie was born in Oudtshoorn and educated at Oudtshoorn Boys' High School, but played his rugby in South West Africa (now Namibia), which as a South African territory still made him eligible for the Springboks.

In 1958, Fourie played on the left wing for the Springboks in two home Test matches against France. He debuted in their 3–3 draw at Newlands and scored the only try from either side when they were beaten 5–9 at Ellis Park.

== See also ==
- List of South Africa national rugby union players
