= Lucien Mias =

France international rugby union player

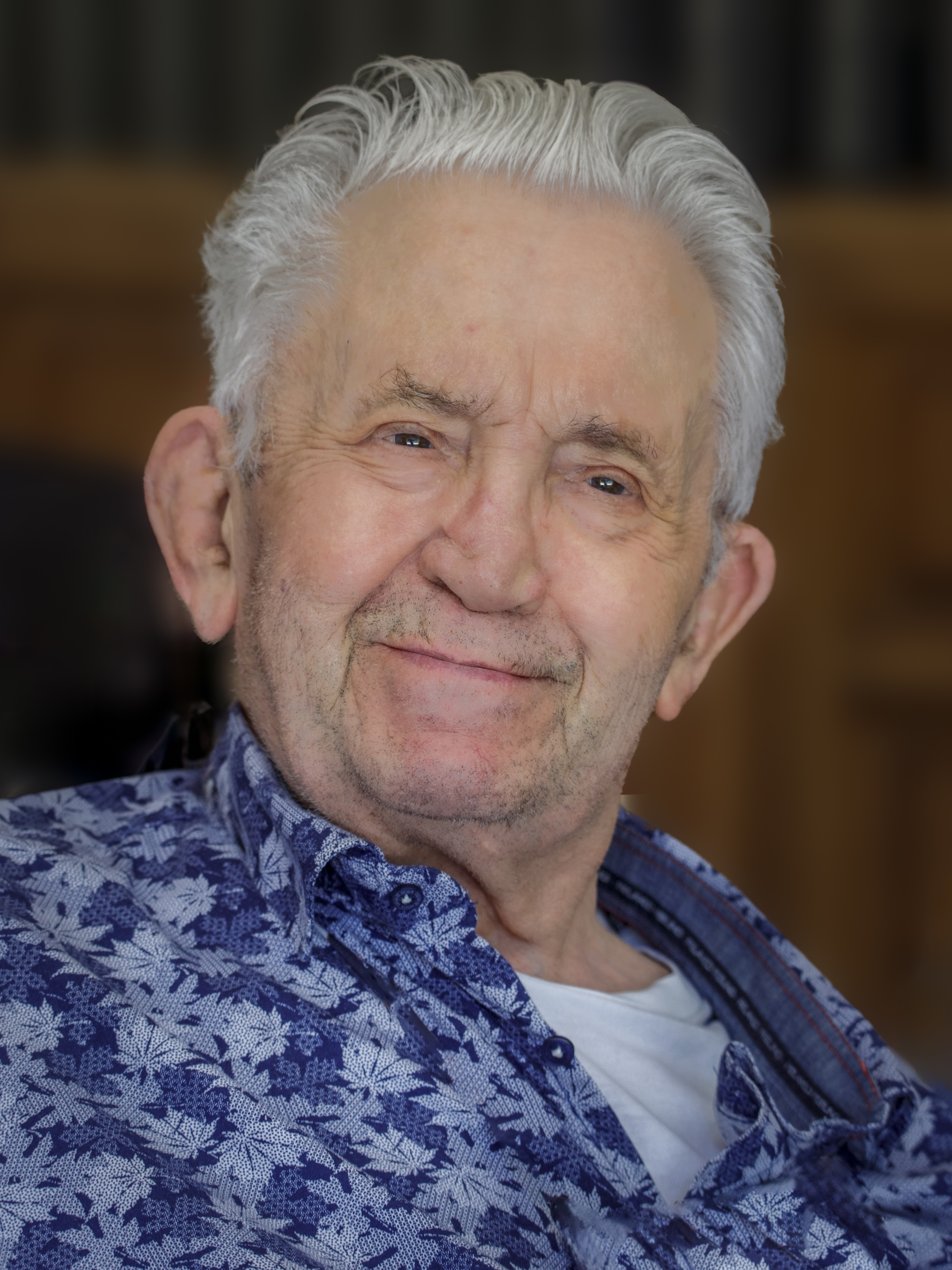
- Mias in 2020
- Born: 29 September 1930 Saint-Germain-de-Calberte, France
- Died: 13 May 2024 (aged 93) Mazamet, France
- Height: 1.89 m (6 ft 2 1/2 in)
- Weight: 108 kg (238 lb)

Rugby union career
- Position: Lock
Amateur team(s)
Years	Team	Apps	(Points)
1949–1950	Carcassonne		
1950–1962	Mazamet		
International career
Years	Team	Apps	(Points)
1951–1959	France	29	(3)

Lucien Mias (29 September 1930 – 13 May 2024) was an international rugby union player for France. His usual position was lock.

Mias captained the French team to win the 1958 France rugby union tour of South Africa, and to their first Five Nations Championship in 1959. He was inducted into the International Rugby Hall of Fame in 2005. Mias died on 13 May 2024, at the age of 93.

In his time, rugby union was an amateur sport. Apart from his sports career, he was working as a rural public schoolteacher then as a geriatrician.
