= Hugo van Zyl =

South African rugby union player

- Full name: Gideon Hugo van Zyl
- Born: 20 August 1932 Porterville, South Africa
- Died: 9 May 2007 (aged 74)

Rugby union career
- Position: Flanker
International career
Years	Team	Apps	(Points)
1958–62	South Africa	17	(12)

Gideon Hugo van Zyl (20 August 1932 — 9 May 2007) was a South African rugby union international.

Born in Porterville, van Zyl was a flanker who captained Western Province and represented the Springboks in 17 Test matches from 1958 to 1962. He scored the Springbok's first ever Test try at Boet Erasmus Stadium in Port Elizabeth, crossing over twice in a win over Scotland in 1960. On the 1960–61 European tour, van Zyl featured in all five Tests and scored the winning try during injury time against Ireland at Lansdowne Road.

== See also ==
- List of South Africa national rugby union players
