= Jan du Preez =

South African rugby union player (1930–2024)

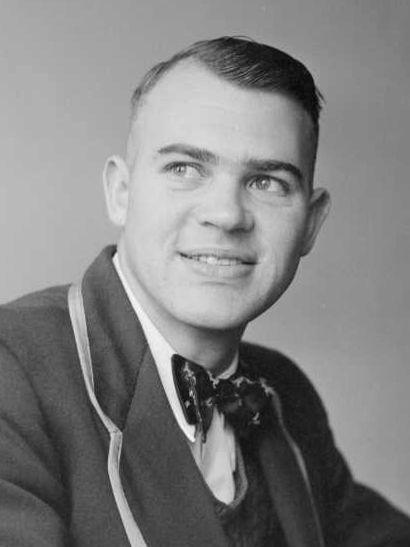
- du Preez in New Zealand in 1956
- Born: Jan Gysbert Hermanus du Preez; 6 October 1930 Piketberg, South Africa
- Died: 19 June 2024 (aged 93)
- Height: 1.83 m (6 ft 0 in)
- Weight: 80 kg (176 lb)
- School: Piketberg High School
- University: University of Stellenbosch

Rugby union career
- Position: Wing
Amateur team(s)
Years	Team	Apps	(Points)
–	Maties		
Provincial / State sides
Years	Team	Apps	(Points)
1951–1958	Western Province		
International career
Years	Team	Apps	(Points)
1956	South Africa	1	(0)

Jan Gysbert Hermanus du Preez (6 October 1930 – 19 June 2024) was a South African rugby union player who made one Test match appearance in 1956. He was the last surviving member of the 1956 Springboks rugby union tour of Australia and New Zealand, dying in June 2024.

== Playing career ==
Du Preez was born in Piketberg and received his schooling at Piketberg High School. He then enrolled at Stellenbosch University to study for a BSc degree and later gained a doctorate in chemistry.

While a student, du Preez began playing provincial rugby for Western Province as a centre, before moving to the wing. His only Test appearance for South Africa came on the 1956 tour of Australia and New Zealand. He was selected to play in the first Test against the All Blacks at Carisbrook, Dunedin—a match that South Africa lost 10–6. Preez died on 19 June 2024, at the age of 93.

=== Test history ===
No.	Opponents	Results (SA 1st)	Position	Tries	Dates	Venue
1.	New Zealand	6–10	Wing		14 Jul 1956	Carisbrook, Dunedin

== See also ==
- List of South Africa national rugby union players – Springbok no. 327
