= Louis Schmidt (rugby union) =

South African rugby union player

- Born: Louis Ulrich Schmidt; 6 February 1936 Middelburg, Eastern Cape, South Africa
- Died: 23 January 1999 (aged 62)
- Height: 1.80 m (5 ft 11 in)
- Weight: 95 kg (209 lb)
- School: Afrikaanse Hoër Seunskool, Pretoria

Rugby union career
Provincial / State sides
Years	Team	Apps	(Points)
1957–1964	Northern Transvaal	62	(124)
International career
Years	Team	Apps	(Points)
1958, 1962	South Africa	2	

Louis Ulrich Schmidt (6 February 1936 – 23 January 1999) was a South African rugby union player. He was the original blue bull. The team name came to be due to his renowned moustache that looked like bull horns.

== Playing career ==
Schmidt played provincial rugby for Northern Transvaal and captained the team on 25 occasions. He made his international debut for the Springboks in the second test match against the visiting team from France, on 16 August 1958 at Ellis Park in Johannesburg. His second test match was four years later, when he played in the second test against the British Lions at Kings Park in Durban.

=== Test history ===
No.	Opposition	Result (SA 1st)	Position	Tries	Date	Venue
1.	France	5–9	Flank		16 Aug 1958	Ellis Park, Johannesburg
2.	British Lions	3–0	Flank		21 Jul 1962	Kings Park, Durban

== See also ==
- List of South Africa national rugby union players – Springbok no. 346
