= Joe Kaminer =

South African rugby union footballer (1934–2021)

- Born: Joseph Kaminer; 25 January 1934 Warmbad, (now Bela-Bela), South Africa
- Died: 3 August 2021 (aged 87)
- Height: 1.83 m (6 ft 0 in)
- Weight: 74 kg (163 lb)
- School: Pietersburg High School

Rugby union career
- Position: Centre
Provincial / State sides
Years	Team	Apps	(Points)
- Transvaal
International career
Years	Team	Apps	(Points)
1958	South Africa	1	(0)

Joe Kaminer (25 January 1934 – 3 August 2021) was a South African rugby union player.

Kaminer, who is Jewish, was born in Warmbad and schooled in Pietersburg. He played a single test for the Boks, making his debut on 16 Aug 1958, with the Boks losing against France at Ellis Park. Kaminer played for Wits and Transvaal.

== Test history ==
No.	Opponents	Results (SA 1st)	Position	Tries	Dates	Venue
1.	France	5–9	Centre		16 Aug 1958	Ellis Park, Johannesburg

== See also ==
- List of select Jewish rugby union players
