= Castetbon =

- Commune
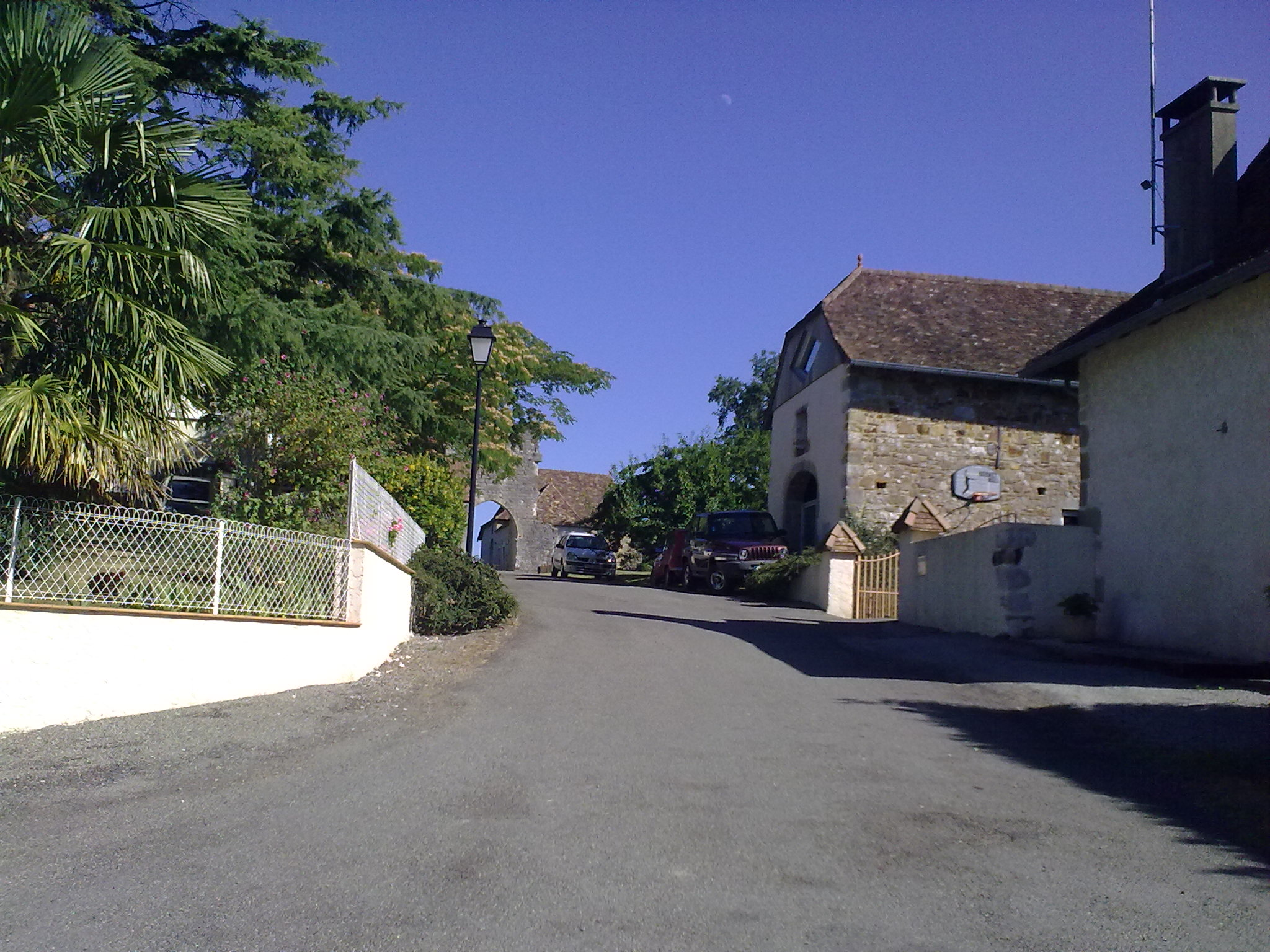
- A general view of Castetbon
- Location of Castetbon
- Location within France Location within Nouvelle-Aquitaine
- Coordinates: 43°23′11″N 0°47′14″W
- Country: France
- Region: Nouvelle-Aquitaine
- Department: Pyrénées-Atlantiques
- Arrondissement: Oloron-Sainte-Marie
- Canton: Orthez et Terres des Gaves et du Sel
- Intercommunality: Béarn des Gaves

Government
  - Mayor (2020–2026): Grégory Nexon
- Area^{1}: 14.20 km^{2} (5.48 sq mi)
- Elevation: 164 m (538 ft)
- Highest elevation: 234 m (768 ft)
- Lowest elevation: 95 m (312 ft)
- Population (2023): 151
  - Density: 10.6/km^{2} (27.5/sq mi)
- Time zone: UTC+01:00 (CET)
  - Summer (DST): UTC+02:00 (CEST)
- INSEE/Postal code: 64176 /64190
- ^{1} French Land Register data, which excludes lakes, ponds, glaciers > 1 km^{2} (0.386 sq mi or 247 acres) and river estuaries.

Castetbon (French pronunciation: [kastɛtbɔ̃]; Occitan: Castèthbon) is a commune in the Pyrénées-Atlantiques department in south-western France.

== See also ==
- Communes of the Pyrénées-Atlantiques department
