= Bertus van der Merwe =

South African rugby union player

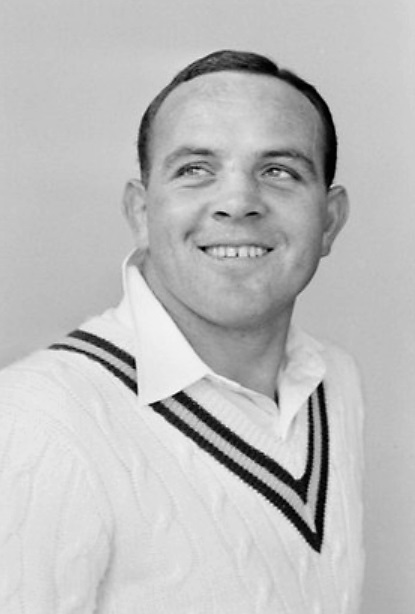
- Van der Merwe in New Zealand in 1956
- Born: Albertus Johannes van der Merwe; 14 July 1929 Rawsonville, Union of South Africa
- Died: 23 November 1971 (aged 42)
- School: Worcester Gymnasium, Worcester

Rugby union career
- Position: Hooker
Provincial / State sides
| Years | Team | Apps | (Points) |
| – | Boland | | |
International career
| Years | Team | Apps | (Points) |
| 1955–1960 | South Africa | 12 | (0) |

Albertus Johannes van der Merwe (14 July 1929 – 23 November 1971) was a South African rugby union player.

== Playing career ==
Van der Merwe was born in Rawsonville and received his schooling at Worcester Gymnasium. He studied at the University of Cape Town and played provincial rugby for Boland.

Van der Merwe made his test match debut for the Springboks against the British Lions in 1955. He then toured with the Springboks to Australia and New Zealand in 1956 and played in all six test matches during the tour. He also played in tests against France in 1958, Scotland in 1960 and his last test was against the All Blacks in 1960. Van der Merwe also played in fourteen tour matches and scored one try.

=== Test history ===
| No. | Opponents | Results (SA 1st) | Position | Tries | Dates | Venue |
|---|---|---|---|---|---|---|
| 1. | British Lions | 25–9 | Hooker | | 20 Aug 1955 | Newlands, Cape Town |
| 2. | British Lions | 6–9 | Hooker | | 3 Sep 1955 | Loftus Versfeld, Pretoria |
| 3. | British Lions | 22–8 | Hooker | | 24 Sep 1955 | Crusaders Ground, Port Elizabeth |
| 4. | Australia | 9–0 | Hooker | | 26 May 1956 | Sydney Cricket Ground, Sydney |
| 5. | Australia | 9–0 | Hooker | | 2 Jun 1956 | Brisbane Exhibition Ground, Brisbane |
| 6. | New Zealand | 6–10 | Hooker | | 14 Jul 1956 | Carisbrook, Dunedin |
| 7. | New Zealand | 8–3 | Hooker | | 4 Aug 1956 | Athletic Park, Wellington |
| 8. | New Zealand | 10–17 | Hooker | | 18 Aug 1956 | Lancaster Park, Christchurch |
| 9. | New Zealand | 5–11 | Hooker | | 1 Sep 1956 | Eden Park, Auckland |
| 10. | France | 3–3 | Hooker | | 26 JuL 1958 | Newlands, Cape Town |
| 11. | Scotland | 18–10 | Hooker | | 30 Apr 1960 | Boet Erasmus, Port Elizabeth |
| 12. | New Zealand | 3–11 | Hooker | | 23 Jul 1960 | Newlands, Cape Town |

== See also ==
- List of South Africa national rugby union players – Springbok no. 323
