= Alfred Roques =

French rugby union player

- Born: February 17, 1925 Cazes-Mondenard, France
- Died: November 7, 2004 (aged 79) Cahors, France
- Height: 5 ft 10 in (1.78 m)
- Weight: 216 lb (98 kg)

Rugby union career
- Position: Prop
International career
Years	Team	Apps	(Points)
1958-1963	France	30	(0)
- Correct as of September 12, 2020

Alfred Roques (17 February 1925 - 7 November 2004) was a French rugby union player who played at prop for the France national rugby union team.

== Early life and career ==
Alfred Roques was born on February 17, 1925, in Cazes-Mondenard, France.

Roques earned his first cap for the France national rugby union team on March 9, 1958.

He made a total of 30 official appearances for the French national team between 1958 and 1963.

Roques was part of the French national team that won the Five Nations Championship in 1959, 1960, 1961 and 1962.

== Death ==
Roques died at the age of 79 in Cahors, France, on November 7, 2004.

== See also ==
- France national rugby union team
