= 1959 Five Nations Championship =

Rugby union competition

- Date: 10 January - 18 April 1959
- Countries: England; Ireland; France; Scotland; Wales

Tournament statistics
- Champions: France (1st title)
- Matches played: 10

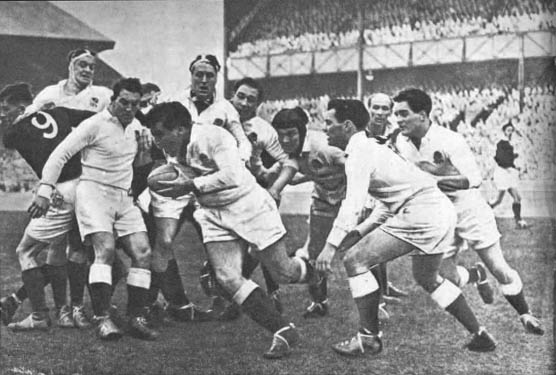
England v Scotland at Twickenham, on March 21

The 1959 Five Nations Championship was the thirtieth series of the rugby union Five Nations Championship. Counting its earlier forms as the Home Nations and Five Nations, this marked the 65th series of the northern hemisphere's rugby union championship. Ten matches were played between 10 January and 18 April. It was contested by England, France, Ireland, Scotland and Wales. France won the title outright for the first time, after two shared wins in 1954 and 1955.

== Participants ==
The teams involved were:

Nation	Venue	City	Captain
England	Twickenham	London	Jeff Butterfield
France	Stade Olympique Yves-du-Manoir	Colombes	Lucien Mias/Jean Barthe
Ireland	Lansdowne Road	Dublin	Ronnie Dawson
Scotland	Murrayfield	Edinburgh	Jim Greenwood/Gordon Waddell
Wales	National Stadium	Cardiff	Clem Thomas

== Table ==
Pos	Team	Pld	W	D	L	PF	PA	PD	Pts
1	France	4	2	1	1	28	15	+13	5
2	Ireland	4	2	0	2	23	19	+4	4
2	Wales	4	2	0	2	21	23	−2	4
2	England	4	1	2	1	9	11	−2	4
5	Scotland	4	1	1	2	12	25	−13	3

== Results ==
1959-01-10

France	9–0	Scotland

Paris
Attendance: 26,003

1959-01-17

Wales	5–0	England

Cardiff

1959-02-07

Scotland	6–5	Wales

Edinburgh
Attendance: 70,000

1959-02-14

Ireland	0–3	England

Dublin
Attendance: 50,000

1959-02-28

England	3–3	France

London
Attendance: 72,000

1959-02-28

Scotland	3–8	Ireland

Edinburgh

1959-03-14

Wales	8–6	Ireland

Cardiff

1959-03-21

England	3–3	Scotland

London
Attendance: 70,000

1959-04-04

France	11–3	Wales

Paris
Attendance: 45,000

1959-04-18

Ireland	9–5	France

Dublin
Attendance: 40,000
