= Bugnein =

- Commune
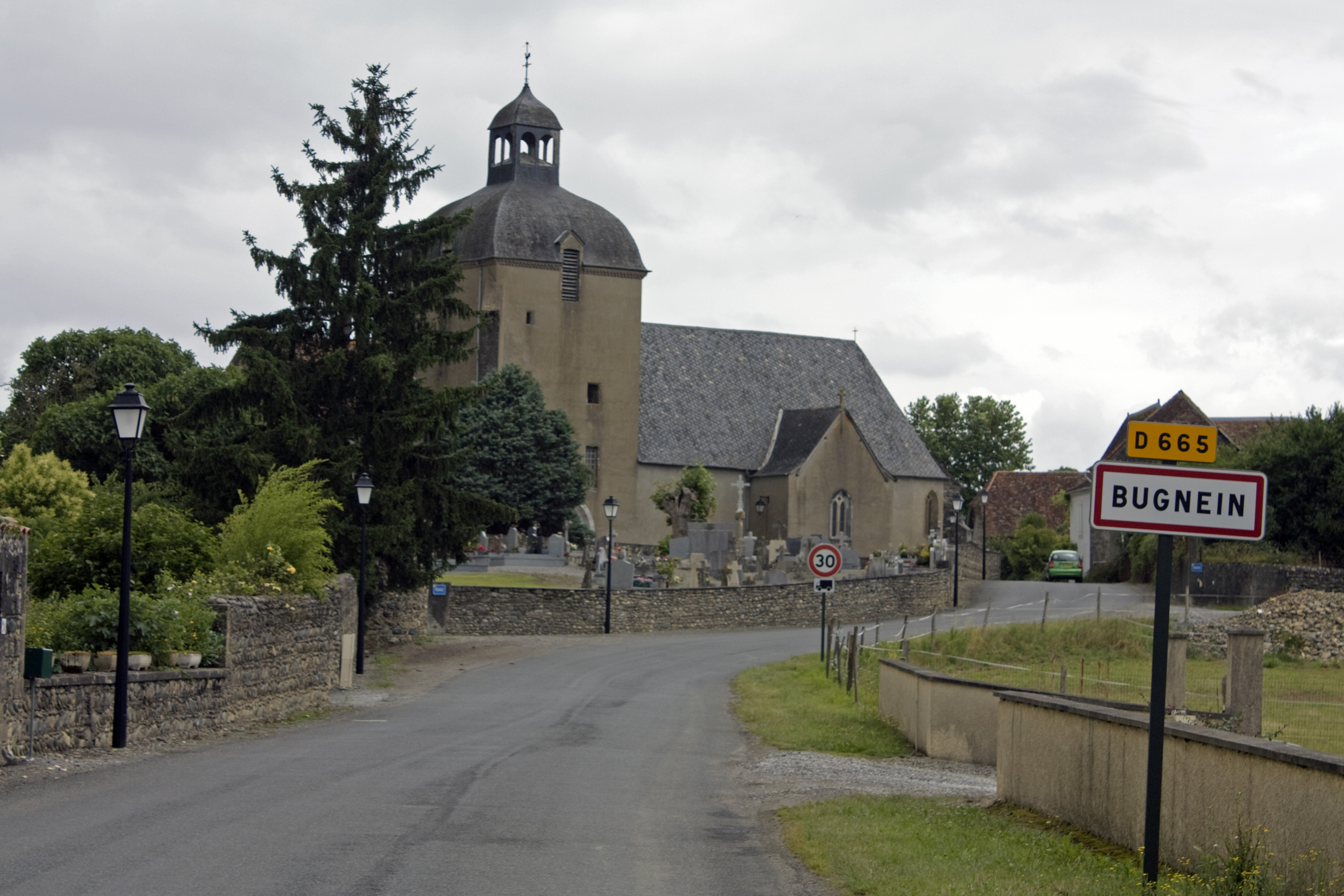
- The road into Bugnein
- Location of Bugnein
- Location within France Location within Nouvelle-Aquitaine
- Coordinates: 43°21′12″N 0°46′51″W
- Country: France
- Region: Nouvelle-Aquitaine
- Department: Pyrénées-Atlantiques
- Arrondissement: Oloron-Sainte-Marie
- Canton: Le Cœur de Béarn

Government
  - Mayor (2020–2026): Philippe Susbielles
- Area^{1}: 11.36 km^{2} (4.39 sq mi)
- Elevation: 116 m (381 ft)
- Highest elevation: 251 m (823 ft)
- Lowest elevation: 98 m (322 ft)
- Population (2023): 218
  - Density: 19.2/km^{2} (49.7/sq mi)
- Time zone: UTC+01:00 (CET)
  - Summer (DST): UTC+02:00 (CEST)
- INSEE/Postal code: 64149 /64190
- ^{1} French Land Register data, which excludes lakes, ponds, glaciers > 1 km^{2} (0.386 sq mi or 247 acres) and river estuaries.

Bugnein (French pronunciation: [byɲɛ̃]; Occitan: Bunhenh) is a commune in the Pyrénées-Atlantiques department in southwestern France.

== See also ==
- Communes of the Pyrénées-Atlantiques department
