= 1955 British Lions tour to South Africa =

- Date: 22 June – 27 September
- Coach: Jack Siggins
- Tour captain: (Ireland) Robin Thompson
- Test series winners: Tied (2–2)
- Top test point scorer: (England) Jeff Butterfield (12)
Summary
P	W	D	L
Total
25	19	1	5
Test match
4	2	0	2
Opponent
P	W	D	L
South Africa
4	2	0	2

Tour chronology
- ← New Zealand and Australia 1950 Australia and New Zealand 1959 →

In 1955 the British Lions rugby union team toured Southern and Eastern Africa. The Lions drew the test series against South Africa, each team winning two of the four matches. They won the first test by a single point and the third by three points and lost the second and fourth matches by wider margins. As well as South Africa, the tour included a match against South West Africa (later to become Namibia), two games against Rhodesia (later to become Zimbabwe) and one versus East Africa.

Overall the tourists played twenty-five matches winning nineteen, losing five and drawing one. The Lions lost their opening fixture against Western Transvaal and were also beaten by Eastern Province and Border later in the tour. They drew with Eastern Transvaal.

It was the Lions' second tour after World War II and the first to South Africa after that war.

The touring party was captained by Robin Thompson of Ireland. The manager was Jack A. E. Siggins and the assistant manager was D. E. Davies.

Jack Siggins had the honour of being invited, by the Rugby Football Union of East Africa (RFUEA), officially to open the newly constructed RFUEA Ground at Ngong Road in Nairobi just prior to the Lions last match of that tour against East Africa.

== Squad ==
=== Management ===
- Manager: J. A. E. Siggins (Ireland)
- Assistant Manager: D. E. Davies

=== Backs ===
- Doug Baker (Old Merchant Taylors and England)
- Jeff Butterfield (Northampton and England)
- Angus Cameron (Glasgow HSFP and Scotland)
- Phil Davies (Harlequins and England)
- Gareth Griffiths (Cardiff and Wales)
- Dickie Jeeps (Northampton) ^{[1]}
- Trevor Lloyd (Maesteg and Wales)
- Cliff Morgan (Cardiff and Wales)
- Haydn Morris (Cardiff and Wales)
- Tony O'Reilly (Old Belvedere and Ireland)
- Cecil Pedlow (Queen's University RFC and Ireland)
- Pat Quinn (New Brighton and England)
- Arthur Smith (Cambridge University and Scotland)
- Frank Sykes (Northampton and England)
- Alun Thomas (Llanelli and Wales)
- Johnny Williams (Old Millhillians and England)

=== Forwards ===
- Tom Elliot (Gala and Scotland)
- Jim Greenwood (Dunfermline and Scotland)
- Reg Higgins (Liverpool and England)
- Hugh McLeod (Hawick and Scotland)
- Bryn Meredith (Newport and Wales)
- Courtney Meredith (Neath and Wales)
- Ernie Michie (Aberdeen University and Scotland)
- Tom Reid (Garryowen and Ireland)
- Russell Robins (Pontypridd and Wales)
- Robin Roe (Lansdowne and Ireland)
- Clem Thomas (Swansea and Wales)
- Robin Thompson (Instonians and Ireland) (Captain)
- Rhys Williams (Llanelli and Wales)
- Billy Williams (Swansea and Wales)
- Dyson Wilson (Metropolitan Police and England)

^{1} Dickie Jeeps later played for England but was uncapped at the time of the 1955 tour.

=== The Idi Amin myth ===
There is a frequently repeated urban legend that Idi Amin (later to become the infamous military dictator of Uganda) was selected as a replacement by East Africa for their match against the 1955 British Lions. The story is entirely unfounded, he does not appear on the team photograph or on the official team list and replacements were not allowed in international rugby until 13 years after this event is supposed to have taken place.

== Results ==
Scores and results list Lions' points tally first.

Opposing Team	For	Against	Date	Venue	Status
Western Transvaal	6	9	22 June 1955	Olen Park, Potchefstroom	Tour match
Giqualand West	24	14	25 June 1955	De Beers Stadium, Kimberley	Tour match
Northern Universities	32	6	29 June 1955	Ellis Park, Johannesburg	Tour match
Orange Free State	31	3	2 July 1955	Loubser Park, Kroonstad	Tour match
South West Africa	9	0	5 July 1955	Mable Volk Stadium, Windhoek	Tour match
Western Province	11	3	9 July 1955	Newlands, Cape Town	Tour match
South West Districts	22	3	13 July 1955	Recreation Ground, George	Tour match
Eastern Province	0	20	16 July 1955	Crusaders Ground, Port Elizabeth	Tour match
North Eastern district	34	6	20 July 1955	Aliwal North	Tour match
Transvaal	36	13	23 July 1955	Ellis Park, Johannesburg	Tour match
Rhodesia	27	14	27 July 1955	Rokhana Ground, Kitwe	Tour match
Rhodesia	16	12	30 July 1955	Police Ground, Salisbury	Tour match
South Africa	23	22	6 August 1955	Ellis Park, Johannesburg	Test Match
Central University	21	14	10 August 1955	Kingsmead, Durban	Tour match
Boland	11	0	13 August 1955	Wellington	Tour match
Western province Universities	20	17	16 August 1955	Newlands, Cape Town	Tour match
South Africa	9	25	20 August 1955	Newlands, Cape Town	Test Match
Eastern Transvaal	17	17	24 August 1955	PAM Brink, Springs	Tour match
Northern Transvaal	14	11	27 August 1955	Loftus Versfeld, Pretoria	Tour match
South Africa	9	6	3 September 1955	Loftus Versfeld, Pretoria	Test Match
Natal	11	8	10 September 1955	Kingsmead, Durban	Tour match
Junior Springboks	15	12	14 September 1955	Free State Stadium, Bloemfontein	Tour match
Border	12	14	17 September 1955	East London	Tour match
South Africa	8	22	24 September 1955	Crusaders Ground, Port Elizabeth	Test Match
East Africa	39	12	27 September 1955	Ngong Road Ground, Nairobi	Tour match

== The matches ==
=== First South Africa Test ===
6 August 1955
2:30pm

South Africa	22–23	British Lions
Try: Briers 2 Koch; Swart; Con: Van der Schyff 2 Pen: Van der Schyff 2	Report	Try: Butterfield; Greenwood; Morgan; O’Reilly; Pedlow; Con: Cameron 4

Ellis Park, Johannesburg
Attendance: 95 000
Referee: Ralph Burmeister (South Africa)

South Africa: Jack van der Schyff, Theuns Briers, Tom van Vollenhoven, Des Sinclair, Sias Swart, Clive Ulyate, Tommy Gentles, Chris Koch, Colin Kroon, Amos du Plooy, Salty du Rand, Johan Claassen, Stephen Fry, Basie van Wyk, Daan Retief

British & Irish Lions: Angus Cameron, Tony O'Reilly, Jeff Butterfield, Phil Davies, Tony O'Reilly, Cliff Morgan, Dickie Jeeps, Billy Williams, Bryn Meredith, Courtenay Meredith, Rhys Williams, Robin Thompson, Reg Higgins, Jim Greenwood, Russell Robins

=== Second South Africa Test ===
20 August 1955
2:30pm

South Africa	25–9	British Lions
Try: Dryburgh; Van Vollenhoven (3); Rosenberg; Briers; Ackermann; Con: Dryburgh (2)	Report	Try: Butterfield; Meredith; Pen: Cameron

Newlands, Cape Town
Attendance: 52 000
Referee: Mike Slabber (South Africa)

South Africa: Roy Dryburgh (WP), Tom van Vollenhoven (N-Tvl), Des Sinclair (Tvl), Wilf Rosenberg (Tvl), Theuns Briers (WP), Clive Ulyate (Tvl), Tommy Gentles (WP), Chris Koch (Boland), Bertus van der Merwe (Boland), Jaap Bekker (N-Tvl), Stephen Fry (C) (WP), Salty du Rand (N-Tvl), Johan Claassen (W-Tvl), Dawie Ackermann (WP), Daan Retief (N-Tvl)

British & Irish Lions: Angus Cameron, Tony O'Reilly, Jeff Butterfield, Phil Davies, Gareth Griffith, Cliff Morgan, Dickie Jeeps, Tom Reid, Jim Greenwood, Russell Robins, Robin Thompson, Rhys Williams, Courtenay Meredith, Bryn Meredith, Billy Williams

=== Third South Africa Test ===
3 September 1955
2:30pm

South Africa	6–9	British Lions
	Report

Loftus Versfeld, Pretoria
Referee: Ralph Burmeister (South Africa)

=== Fourth South Africa Test ===
24 September 1955
2:30pm

South Africa	22–8	British Lions
Try: Van Vollenhoven; Briers (2); Ulyate; Retief; Con: Dryburgh (2); Drop: Ulyate (1)	Report	Try: O'Reilly; Greenwood; Con: Pedlow (1)

Crusaders Ground, Port Elizabeth
Attendance: 37 000
Referee: Chris Ackermann (South Africa)

== Bibliography ==
- Thomas, Clem; Thomas, Greg (2001). The History of The British and Irish Lions. Mainstream Books. pp. 100–117. ISBN 1-84018-498-1.
