= Dickie Jeeps =

British Lions & England international rugby union player

- Born: Richard Eric Gautrey Jeeps; 25 November 1931 Chesterton, Cambridge, England
- Died: 8 October 2016 (aged 84)
- School: Bedford Modern School

Rugby union career
- Position: Scrum half
Amateur team(s)
Years	Team	Apps	(Points)
- Cambridge R.U.F.C.
Senior career
Years	Team	Apps	(Points)
- Northampton Saints
International career
Years	Team	Apps	(Points)
1955–62	British and Irish Lions	13	
1956–62	England	24	

Richard Eric Gautrey Jeeps, CBE (25 November 1931 – 8 October 2016), known as Dickie Jeeps, was an English rugby union player who played for Northampton having started his career with Cambridge Rugby Club. He represented and captained both the England national rugby union team and the British Lions in the 1950s and 1960s. He subsequently became a sports administrator and Chairman of the Sports Council. He was appointed CBE in 1977.

== Biography ==
Richard Eric Gautrey Jeeps was born on 25 November 1931 in Chesterton (England). He was educated at Bedford Modern School.

Jeeps played at scrum half 24 times for England including all four matches of the Grand Slam season of 1957. Jeeps was selected to join the British Lions party to tour South Africa in 1955 and is one of that select group of players capped for the British Lions before being capped by his country. Jeeps felt that his selection for the Lions was due to playing an invitation match with Cliff Morgan in Cornwall shortly before the Lions party was announced. "I think Cliff got me in the party because he liked my service." Despite being originally the third choice scrum half in the 1955 squad, he played in all four tests of the drawn series.

He was also selected for the 1959 British Lions tour to Australia and New Zealand and the 1962 British Lions tour to South Africa, bringing his Lions test appearances to 13, a record at the time. Only Willie John McBride has represented the Lions more times since.

In 1959 Jeeps' ability to serve up decent possession from apparently any angle led New Zealanders to dub him "the India-rubber Man". They also rated him the most complete footballer of the Lions' backs, high praise indeed when the Lions party included Bev Risman, David Hewitt, Tony O'Reilly, Peter Jackson and Ken Scotland.

In 1962 the South Africans also rated him amongst the best of the visiting backs, although this time he caught the eye as much for his astute marshalling of his pack as for skill as an instigator of flashing attacks. He captained the Lions in the final test.

Jeeps played his first match for England in 1956 and his last in 1962. He captained England 13 times with a captaincy record of played 13, won five, drawn four, lost four. His twenty-four caps remained a record for an England scrum-half for twenty years, until Steve Smith surpassed it.

In later life Jeeps was President of the Rugby Football Union in 1976-77 and Chairman of the Sports Council for seven years. He died on 8 October 2016 at the age of 84.

Sporting positions
Preceded by Jeff Butterfield	English National Rugby Union Captain; 1960–62	Succeeded by Richard Sharp
