= Cecil Pedlow =

Irish rugby union player (1934–2019)

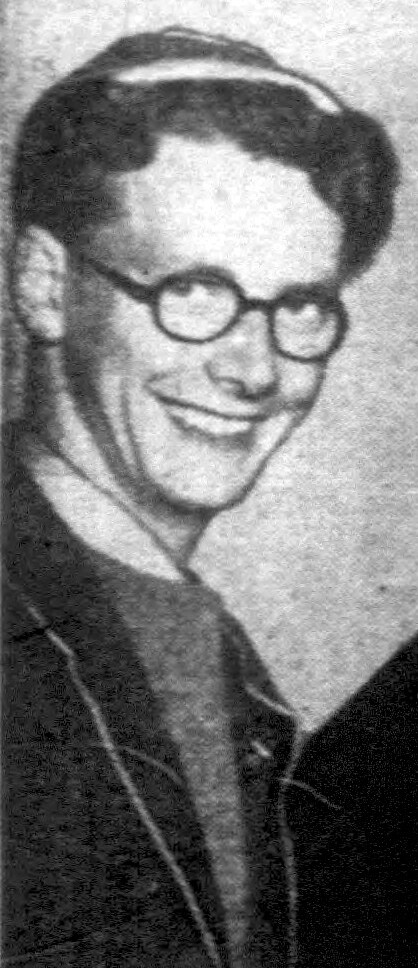
- Pedlow in 1953
- Born: Alexander Cecil Pedlow; 20 January 1934 Lurgan, Northern Ireland
- Died: 9 November 2019 (aged 85)

Rugby union career
- Position: Wing/Centre
Senior career
Years	Team	Apps	(Points)
- Queen's University RFC
- Correct as of 7 Aug 2011
International career
Years	Team	Apps	(Points)
1953–1963	Ireland	30	(31)
1955	Lions	2	(5)
- Correct as of 7 Aug 2011

Alexander Cecil Pedlow (20 January 1934 – 9 November 2019) was an Irish rugby union player, particularly remembered for his tenure with the British Lions. He represented Ireland 30 times and the British Lions, earning two caps for them on the 1955 tour to South Africa. He retired in 1963.

== Personal life ==
Pedlow was born in Lurgan on 20 January 1934. His father Robert was a country doctor in Lurgan and a keen sportsman, playing rugby for Lurgan RFC. Pedlow's great-uncle James Cecil Parke, was another all-time Irish great. Pedlow's grandfather, Robert Pedlow and great grandfather Joseph Pedlow were also Irish rugby internationals. The eldest of the Pedlow brothers, Peter, went on to become an Irish swimming champion. He held the Irish butterfly-stroke record for 7 years. Peter was also a consultant gynaecologist and was credited with introducing the "dolphin" stroke into Irish swimming at the time.

== Early sports career ==
Cecil Pedlow represented Ireland at squash, rugby and controversially missed out on representing Ireland in the Davis Cup at tennis. He did go on to represent Irish tennis at veteran and vintage representative levels and won numerous titles all over Ireland.

Pedlow had already represented Ireland (junior level) at Junior Wimbledon after winning the u-18 title at the All-Ireland Tennis Championships at Fitzwilliam Tennis Club (Dublin) in 1952, aged 17. Pedlow was sent a telegram from the ILTA stating that he had been picked to represent Ireland at Wimbledon and that the ITLA would pay for his fare (second class) to represent his country at Junior Wimbledon. Pedlow went out in the second round (after getting a bye in the first) to a talented French junior. Pedlow later arranged to meet his victor at the French Championships at Roland Garros in 2004.

Pedlow showed early promise at other sports including hockey and cricket. He was educated at Garth House (A Campbell College Prep- School) and then attended Ulster's only private school, Campbell College when he was 11 and became a full-time boarder. Pedlow's first sporting achievements started off at Campbell College playing hockey and enjoying the 'bat ball' philosophy behind the game.

After Campbell College, Pedlow moved from east to south Belfast to attend Queen's University Belfast and studied dentistry. Queen's provided the career platform to further his professional and sporting career.

Pedlow played for the university freshers in his first year but his strength, speed and footballing talent soon propelled him towards provincial and national honours and the provincial/international selectors began to take notice. Pedlow was a fierce tackler and despite relatively poor eyesight, this did not prove to be major hindrance in his sporting career.

== International rugby ==
Pedlow's first cap was against Wales at the Cardiff Arms Park in the 1954–55 season in which Ireland lost 6–3.

According to Pedlow, "The game was a bit dull and I found myself with the ball with a chance to drop-kick-it was my first cap but I decided to go for it-I hit it. Bang. It sliced to the right wing miles away. It was very embarrassing but it ended up at the touchline corner-flag and we scored- I was extremely lucky as I got picked again."

Further international recognition followed and Pedlow established himself as the leading centre/wing for Ireland over the next eight years. Pedlow finished his career with 30 Irish caps ("One more than Cliff Morgan and Tony O'Reilly"-he quipped) and two Lions caps.

Pedlow reached the zenith of his career in 1955 when he was selected for the historic tour to South Africa for the Irish and British Lions. The tour was managed and captained by fellow Ulstermen Jack Siggins Robin Thompson. Pedlow's favourite sport was tennis when he managed to finish off one of the most iconic tries of all time in the history of Rugby Union.

Pedlow played in the first and fourth tests on the 1955 tour and if the statistics include the Rhodesian (as it was then) leg of the tour, he ended up as top points scorer as he was also a talented goal kicker. The test series finished in a 2–2 which was seen as an excellent result as away series victories were extremely rare against the South Africa Springboks. Pedlow kept a detailed diary of the whole tour and this diary was referenced in Stewart McKinney's book Pedlow's last cap for Ireland was against France.

== After rugby ==
Pedlow went on to represent Ireland at squash six times and won various tournaments all over Ireland. He also went on to represent Ireland again at veteran age level (over 45) and was the Irish Champion for seven successive years during which he remained unbeaten and did not lose a single match.

At vintage level (over 55), once again, he became all-Ireland champion and represented Ireland in various international championships.
