= Matthew Rees =

Welsh rugby union player (born 1980)

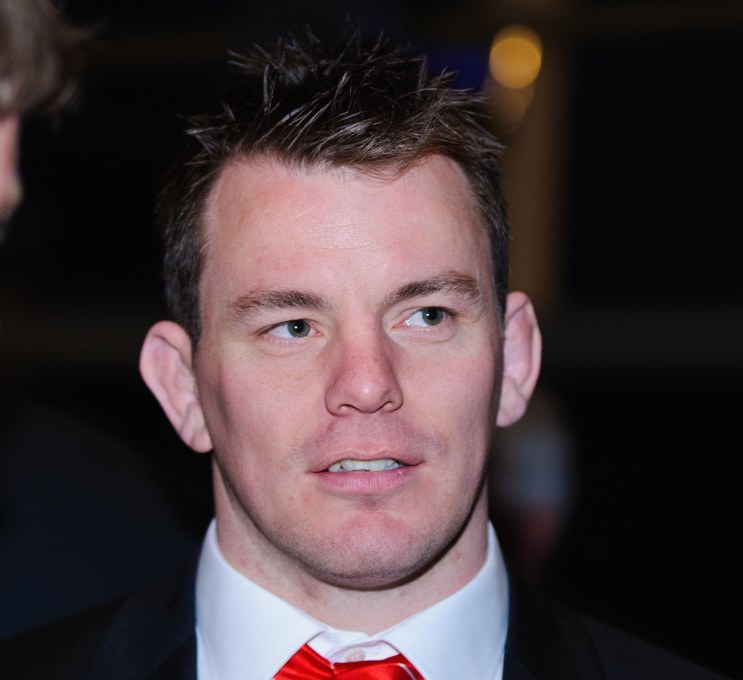
- Rees in 2012
- Full name: Matthew Rees
- Born: 9 December 1980 (age 45) Tonyrefail, Mid Glamorgan, Wales
- Height: 6 ft 2 in (188 cm)
- Weight: 17 st 2 lb (240 lb; 109 kg)

Rugby union career
- Position: Hooker
Youth career
- Tonyrefail RFC
- Merthyr RFC
Senior career
| Years | Team | Apps | (Points) |
| 2001–2003 | Pontypridd RFC | 34 | (?) |
| 2003–2004 | Celtic Warriors | | |
| 2004–2013 | Scarlets | 182 | (25) |
| 2005–2006 | Carmarthen Quins RFC | 1 | (0) |
| 2013–2019 | Cardiff Blues | | |
International career
| Years | Team | Apps | (Points) |
| 2005–2014 | Wales | 60 | (10) |
| 2009 | British & Irish Lions | 8 | (0) |
| 2013 | Barbarians | 1 | (0) |

Matthew Rees (born 9 December 1980) is a Welsh former professional rugby union footballer who played as a hooker. After beginning his career with Tonyrefail RFC and Merthyr RFC, he made his professional debut for Pontypridd RFC in 2001. With the arrival of regional rugby in Wales in 2003, he joined the Celtic Warriors, but their closure a year later led to him signing for the Llanelli Scarlets. He played more than 180 matches for the Scarlets, captaining them on several occasions, leading to his first Wales call-up in 2005.

He became Wales' first-choice hooker for the 2007 Rugby World Cup, and played in all five matches as Wales won the Grand Slam in the 2008 Six Nations Championship. In 2009, Rees was selected for the British & Irish Lions' tour of South Africa, playing in all three tests. He missed the 2011 Rugby World Cup due to a neck injury, but returned to the team to play twice in another Grand Slam-winning campaign in the 2012 Six Nations Championship. In 2013, Rees joined the Cardiff Blues, but a diagnosis of testicular cancer in October 2013 ruled him out of action for almost six months. He made his last appearance for Wales on a tour to South Africa in 2014; his 60 caps made him Wales' most-capped hooker until Ken Owens overtook him in 2019. In February 2019, Rees announced that he would be retiring from rugby at the end of the 2018–19 season.

== Club career ==
=== Pontypridd ===
Born in Tonyrefail, Mid Glamorgan, Rees played for Tonyrefail RFC and Merthyr RFC as a youngster, before joining the Pontypridd Under-21 Academy from the 2000–01 season. At Sardis Road, he earned the nickname "Smiler". Rees made one substitute appearance for the side in the 2001–02 Celtic League, along with three appearances as a replacement in the 2001–02 European Challenge Cup. In the following season, Rees played in three 2002–03 Celtic League games, starting in two, and made three appearances in the 2002–03 European Challenge Cup, two of these coming from the bench.

=== Celtic Warriors ===
With the regionalisation of Welsh professional club rugby, Rees joined the Celtic Warriors in 2003. Rees made 16 appearances for the Warriors in the 2003–04 Celtic League, as well as one appearance in the 2003–04 Heineken Cup. The Celtic Warriors team was disbanded after its first season due to financial issues however, and Rees moved to Llanelli Scarlets, another one of the recently founded Welsh regional sides.

=== Scarlets ===
Rees spent nine seasons with Scarlets, playing with the team from the 2004–05 season until the end of the 2012–13 campaign. Rees made over 170 appearances for the team and captained the side on a number of occasions.

=== Cardiff Blues ===
Rees moved from Scarlets to Cardiff Blues for the 2013–14 season and on 16 August 2013 was named as captain for the season. Rees was diagnosed with testicular cancer in October 2013 however, and was forced to take a leave of absence from the game to receive treatment. He returned to the game in March 2014. In November 2015, he was sent off for stamping on Harlequins number 8 Nick Easter in a 2015–16 European Rugby Challenge Cup match just 15 minutes after coming on as a replacement for Kristian Dacey. His first try for the Blues came in March 2016, when he scored the second try in a 37–28 bonus-point victory over Munster. His second try came a year and a half later, in November 2017, scoring the third of the Blues' five tries in a 37–8 win over Zebre. In February 2019, Rees announced that he would be retiring at the end of the 2018–19 season, his sixth season with the Blues.

== International career ==
Rees made his debut for Wales against the United States in 2005.

In June 2009, Rees was selected in an all-Welsh front row along with Gethin Jenkins and Adam Jones for the British & Irish Lions' second test against South Africa. It was the first time an all-Welsh front row had been selected for a Lions test match since Billy Williams, Bryn Meredith and Courtney Meredith on the 1955 tour.

On 18 January 2010, Rees was named in the 35-man Wales squad for the 2010 Six Nations. Rees was appointed captain of the Welsh side in place of the injured Ryan Jones for the test against Australia at the Millennium Stadium on 6 November 2010 and retained the captaincy for the 2011 Six Nations Championship.

On 29 May 2010, Rees was voted Rhondda Sport Personality of the year.

Rees missed the 2011 Rugby World Cup due to a neck injury that also saw Sam Warburton take over as captain. Wales went on to achieve fourth place.

On 26 May 2013, Rees played for the Barbarians against England in a warm-up match before England's tour of Argentina.

In 2013, Rees was forced to take time away from the game in November 2013 for treatment for testicular cancer. However he had recovered from his illness and he was able to get two more Welsh international caps again against South African Rugby Union and on 14 June 2014 Rees became the most capped hooker for Wales as he surpassed Garin Jenkins.
