= Rugby union in the Cayman Islands =

- Location of the Cayman Islands
- Country: Cayman Islands
- Governing body: Cayman Rugby
- National team: Cayman Islands
- Registered players: 2,256
- Clubs: 6

National competitions
- Rugby World Cup; Rugby World Cup Sevens; IRB Sevens World Series; Caribbean Championship

Rugby union is a growing sport in the Cayman Islands. The Cayman Islands national rugby union team is ranked 53rd in the world, with 2,256 registered players.

== Governing body ==
The governing body is Cayman Rugby, which is a member of World Rugby, and the Rugby Americas North (RAN).

== History ==
Although there has been interest in the game in the Cayman Islands for decades, it only became properly organised in 1972, when the Cayman Islands RFC was founded. This team faced the challenge of having no rugby ball, pitch, and no clubhouse, for several years, and their nearest opponents were in Jamaica 600 miles away. In 1975, however, Jeff Butterfield, a former England player acquired the rights to a piece of pine forest, which was turned into their pitch.

Nowadays, the islands have their own men's team, and also a women's team, which was established in 2004. There is also a national Sevens team. A schools development programme is also now in force allowing the development of an under 18/19 national team.

The Cayman Islands compete in the Caribbean Championship, a tournament which includes Trinidad and Tobago, Bermuda, Martinique, Jamaica, the Bahamas, British Virgin Islands, Antigua and Guyana.

== Teams ==
=== Male ===
- Queensgate Pigs Trotters RFC (Originally a police team)
- Advance Fire & Plumbing Buccaneers RFC
- John Doak Iguanas RFC
- Fidelity Cayman Storm RFC

Other former teams include:

- The Cayman Surge
- ReMax Old Boys - Tarnished Turtles RFC

=== Female ===
- The Iguanas
- Buccaneers
- Trotters
