= 1981 Italy rugby union tour of Australia =

Summary
P	W	D	L
Total
9	7	0	2

The 1981 Italy rugby union tour of Australia was a series of matches played between June and August 1981 in Australia by in Australia by Italy national rugby union team. No test matches was played. It was the first visit to Australia by an Italian rugby team, and follow after one year the tour of New Zealand and Pacific.

== Results ==
Scores and results list Italys' points tally first.

Opposing Team	Score			Date	Venue	Status	Reports	
Opposing Team	Result	For	Against	Date	Venue	Status	Preview	Match
Central Queensland	Won	27	8	19 July 1981	Rockhampton	Tour match		
Mount Isa	Won	38	3	22 July 1981	Mount Isa	Tour match		
Townsville	Won	30	13	26 July 1981	Townsville	Tour match		
Cairns	Won	29	0	30 July 1981	Cairns	Tour match		
Queensland	Lost	11	68	2 August 1981	Ballymore Stadium, Brisbane	Tour match		
New South Wales Country	Won	18	13	5 August 1981	Groundz Precinct, Wollongong	Tour match		
A.C.T.	Lost	18	19	9 August 1981	Manuka Oval, Canberra	Tour match		
South Australia	Won	22	3	11 August 1981	Adelaide	Tour match		
Victoria	Won	28	6	13 August 1981	Olympic Park, Melbourne	Tour match		

== Bibliography ==
- (in Italian) Valerio Vecchiarelli, Francesco Volpe, 2000, Italia in meta, GS editore, 2000.
