= Bryn Meredith =

British Lions & Wales international rugby union footballer

- Born: Brinley Victor Meredith; 21 October 1930 (age 96) Abersychan, Wales
- Height: 1.80 m (5 ft 11 in)
- Weight: 87 kg (13 st 10 lb)
- School: West Monmouth Grammar School
- University: St. Luke's College, Exeter

Rugby union career
- Position: Hooker
Amateur team(s)
Years	Team	Apps	(Points)
- Devonport Services R.F.C.
–	London Welsh RFC		
–	Newport RFC		
–	Barbarian F.C.		
International career
Years	Team	Apps	(Points)
1954-1962	Wales	34	(9)
1955-1962	British Lions	8	(3)

Brinley "Bryn" Victor Meredith (born 21 October 1930 in Abersychan) was a Wales rugby union international. Meredith was a mobile hooker, he was selected 34 times for Wales between 1954 and 1962, but missed 2 matches for health and family bereavement reasons.

== British Lion ==
In 1955 he was part of the British Lions tour of South Africa, in which the British tourists shared the Test series against South Africa 2-2 and Meredith scored his record six tries, including the pick of the second international in Cape Town. The Lions lost, but their hooker enhanced his reputation by winning a crucial strike in the scrum and then having the pace to get himself among the three-quarters and pop up outside centre Phil Davies to take a scoring pass.

On the 1955 Lions Tour the all-Welsh front row of Billy Williams, Bryn Meredith and Courtney Meredith was selected for a Lions test match. This did not occur again until June 2009 when Gethin Jenkins, Adam Jones and Matthew Rees were selected as the British and Irish Lions front row for the 2nd Test against South Africa.

In 1959, Meredith was a Lion again, but found himself in the unfortunate position of competing against tour captain Ronnie Dawson for a place in the Test team. Consequently, he finished as the only Lion not to appear in an international, although many judges felt he should have been selected for the final match of the series.

Captaincy of the team against the Junior All Blacks was a small consolation, but he never complained about his lot and even appeared as a flanker when injuries demanded on the Australian leg of the tour.

In 1962, Meredith was a live candidate for the tour captaincy himself, and although he missed out to Arthur Smith he added to his reputation in South Africa once more with another excellent tour capped by appearances in all four Tests.

He retired at the end of that tour, having played eight Tests for the Lions. He was voted his country's sportsman of the year in his final season.

== Club career ==
Meredith played his club rugby for London Welsh and Newport. He is generally considered to be one of the finest forwards of all time, and is almost obligatorily found in selections of "the greatest Welsh Rugby Teams of all time".
