= Sias Swart =

South African rugby union player

- Full name: Josias Johannes Nicolaas Swart
- Born: 29 July 1934 Otjiwarongo, South West Africa
- Died: 18 January 1993 (aged 58)

Rugby union career
- Position: Wing three–quarter
Provincial / State sides
Years	Team	Apps	(Points)
- South West Africa
International career
Years	Team	Apps	(Points)
1955	South Africa	1	(3)

Josias Johannes Nicolaas Swart (29 July 1934 – 18 January 1993), known as Sias Swart, was an international rugby union player for South Africa.

Born in Otjiwarongo, South West Africa, Swart was a descendant of Dorsland Trekkers and had six siblings.

Swart was the first Springbok to hail from South West Africa. He gained his sole Springboks cap playing on the left wing in the opening Test match against the 1955 British Lions at Ellis Park. His late try helped spark a Springboks comeback, but they were to lose by a single point, with Jack van der Schyff missing a shot a goal in the final moments.

== See also ==
- List of South Africa national rugby union players
