= Daan Retief =

South African rugby union player

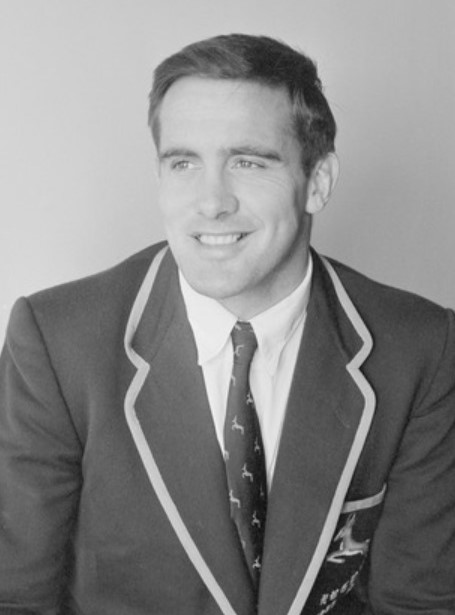
- Born: Daniël Francois Retief; 28 June 1925 Lichtenburg, Transvaal
- Died: 22 September 2010 (aged 85) Bedfordview, Gauteng
- Height: 1.86 m (6 ft 1 in)
- Weight: 96 kg (212 lb)
- School: Lichtenburg High School
- University: University of Pretoria

Rugby union career
- Position(s): Loose-forward, Wing
Provincial / State sides
Years	Team	Apps	(Points)
1950–	Northern Transvaal	45	
International career
Years	Team	Apps	(Points)
1955–1956	South Africa	9	(12)

Daniël Francois Retief (28 June 1925 – 22 September 2010) was a South African rugby union player.

== Playing career ==
Retief matriculated at Lichtenburg High School and took his BCom degree at the University of Pretoria. He started his career as a wing for Northern Transvaal and later switched to loose-forward.

Retief made his test match debut for South Africa against Robin Thompson's British Lions side in 1955 at Ellis Park in front of over 90,000 fans. He toured with the Springboks to Australia and New Zealand in 1956 and was one of the few players who represented South Africa in all six Test matches on the tour. On the tour he scored 11 tries, 3 of which were in tests and during a difficult tour where the team was plagued by injuries, Retief played in 18 games.

=== Test history ===
No.	Opponents	Results (SA 1st)	Position	Tries	Dates	Venue
1.	British Lions	25–9	Number 8		6 Aug 1955	Ellis Park, Johannesburg
2.	(British & Irish Lions) British Lions	6–9	Number 8		20 Aug 1955	Newlands, Cape Town
3.	(British & Irish Lions) British Lions	22–8	Number 8	1	24 Sep 1955	Crusaders Ground, Port Elizabeth
4.	Australia	9–0	Flank	1	26 May 1956	Sydney Cricket Ground, Sydney
5.	Australia	9–0	Flank	1	2 Jun 1956	Brisbane Exhibition Ground, Brisbane
6.	New Zealand	6–10	Flank		14 Jul 1956	Carisbrook, Dunedin
7.	New Zealand	8–3	Flank	1	4 Aug 1956	Athletic Park, Wellington
8.	New Zealand	10–17	Number 8		18 Aug 1956	Lancaster Park, Christchurch
9.	New Zealand	5–11	Flank		1 Sep 1956	Eden Park, Auckland

== See also ==
- List of South Africa national rugby union players – Springbok no. 320
