= Chris Koch =

Chris Koch may refer to:

- Chris Koch (director), American film and television director.
- Chris Koch (rugby union) (1927–1986), South African rugby union player.

== See also ==
- Christopher Koch
