= Cliff Morgan =

British Lions & Wales international rugby union player and broadcaster (1930–2013)

Cliff Morgan CVO, OBE
- Born: Clifford Isaac Morgan; 7 April 1930 Trebanog, Rhondda, Wales
- Died: 29 August 2013 (aged 83)
- Height: 5 ft 7 in (1.70 m)
- School: Tonyrefail Grammar School
- University: Cardiff University

Rugby union career
- Position: Fly-half
Amateur team(s)
Years	Team	Apps	(Points)
1949–1958	Cardiff RFC		
1955–1956	Bective Rangers		
1950–1958	Barbarians		
International career
Years	Team	Apps	(Points)
1951–1958	Wales	29	(9)
1955	British Lions	4	(3)

Clifford Isaac Morgan, CVO OBE (7 April 1930 – 29 August 2013) was a Welsh rugby union player who played for Cardiff RFC and earned 29 caps for Wales between 1951 and 1958. After his playing career ended, Morgan made a successful career in broadcasting, both as a commentator and presenter and also as a programme-maker and BBC executive.

== Rugby career ==
Morgan, born in Trebanog in the Rhondda valley, was from a mining family and joined Cardiff Rugby Club straight from Tonyrefail Grammar School in 1949, playing at fly-half. Blessed with natural balance and strength, together with an astute line-kicking ability and searing acceleration, he quickly made an impact. He also played club rugby in Ireland for Bective Rangers in the 1955–56 season, with the club being dubbed the "Morgan Rangers" as a result.

He won his first cap for Wales against Ireland in 1951, playing opposite his own hero Jack Kyle. He was part of the Grand Slam-winning Welsh side of 1952. The following year he inspired both Cardiff and Wales to historic victories over the touring All Blacks. In 1956, following his success on the 1955 British Lions tour to South Africa, he was made captain of Wales. During that tour, in which the Test series was drawn 2–2, Morgan distinguished himself for his marshalling of a talented Lions backline that included Jeff Butterfield and Arthur Smith in the centre, with Cecil Pedlow and Tony O'Reilly on the wings. Morgan's try in the first Test at Ellis Park, in front of a then world-record crowd of 100,000, helped secure a sensational 23–22 victory at the end of a match that some still consider the most exciting ever played.

The Springboks levelled the series in the second Test. Then, with Lions skipper Robin Thompson injured ahead of the third Test in Pretoria, Morgan was made captain and duly inspired his team and controlled the game to ensure a 9–6 win that meant the series could not be lost. The South African newspapers dubbed him "Morgan the Magnificent" and the level to which his influence was thought key was reflected in the frenzy of coverage his injured ankle received as the fourth Test came around. Although he played, he was not fully fit and the Lions could not prevent the Springboks squaring the series. But his reputation was already made and the memory of that tour – still known in South Africa as "the Cliff Morgan tour" – proved long-lived. His last game of first-class rugby was for the Barbarians on 28 May 1958 at the RFUEA Ground, Nairobi, versus East Africa.

== Broadcasting and television career ==
Following his retirement from the game in 1958 he found a new career in broadcasting. Although he will forever be remembered for his celebrated commentary on the 1973 Barbarians rugby match against the touring All Blacks at Cardiff (particularly the commentary of "that try, that golden try") his broadcasting career was far more wide-ranging and influential than that single event would suggest. During his playing days he had already been spotted by the BBC in Wales as a natural talker and communicator, and in 1960, at the invitation of the BBC's Head of Welsh Programmes, Hywel Davies, he joined BBC Wales as Sports Organiser in Cardiff. His exceptional ability as a programme-maker and story-teller briefly took him outside the familiar world of BBC Sport in the mid-1960s, when he spent two years as editor of ITV's current affairs programme This Week. Returning to the BBC he then produced and edited established TV sports programmes such as Grandstand and Sportsnight With Coleman, and, from 1970, was himself one of the original team captains (opposite Henry Cooper) on the long-running TV quiz A Question of Sport. In radio he found a natural outlet for his love of music, presenting for a time the BBC Radio 2 series These You Have Loved. He also presented 'Singing Together' a radio for schools programme.

Off-air, his enduring influence in the world of sport and beyond helped him rise to join the ranks of leading BBC executives. In 1974 he became Head of BBC Radio Sport and Outside Broadcasts, and from 1976 to 1987 he was Head of BBC Television Sport and Outside Broadcasts, supervising coverage of major events including football World Cups, Commonwealth and Olympic Games, Royal weddings and other national ceremonial occasions, notably the funeral of Mountbatten in 1979 and the wedding of Charles and Diana in 1981.

After his retirement from his executive post in BBC Television in 1987 he returned to radio, where his warm, mellifluous voice, together with his natural conversational style and his wide range of contacts in sport and entertainment, greatly benefited BBC Radio 4 series such as Sport on Four (1987–1998), My Heroes (1987–90) and Down The River. In 1988 he was a subject of ITV's This Is Your Life. He contributed to numerous publications about rugby and lent his voice to many popular rugby videos. Among his books, he edited Rugby The Great Ones (1970), wrote perceptive short profiles to accompany John Ireland's illustrations for the anthology Rugby Characters (1990), and in 1996 produced his autobiography, Cliff Morgan: Beyond the Fields of Play (with Geoffrey Nicholson).

Morgan survived a life-threatening stroke in 1972 at the age of 42. He had been commentating on a Rugby match for BFBS in Germany. He spent three weeks in RAF Hospital Wegberg and spoke very highly of his treatment there. He made a full recovery. In retirement, he was afflicted with cancer of the vocal cords and the removal of his larynx, resulting in limited ability to speak. Morgan died at his home in Bembridge, Isle of Wight, on 29 August 2013 at the age of 83.

== Awards ==
When the International Rugby Hall of Fame was created in 1997, Morgan was among the inaugural inductees, alongside his Lions contemporary Tony O'Reilly and Welsh rugby legends Gareth Edwards, Barry John and J. P. R. Williams. In 2009, he was inducted along with O'Reilly into the IRB Hall of Fame, an honour Edwards had received two years earlier.

For his contributions to broadcasting, he was honoured with an OBE and a CVO.
