= Jack van der Schyff =

South African rugby union player

- Full name: Jack Henry van der Schyff
- Born: 11 June 1928 Kimberley, South Africa
- Died: 2 December 2001 (aged 73) Carletonville, South Africa

Rugby union career
- Position: Fullback
Provincial / State sides
| Years | Team | Apps | (Points) |
- Griqualand West
International career
| Years | Team | Apps | (Points) |
| 1949–55 | South Africa | 5 | (10) |

Jack Henry van der Schyff (11 June 1928 – 2 December 2001) was a South African international rugby union player.

Born in Kimberley, van der Schyff attended Kimberley Boys' High School and was discovered during World War II by ex–Springbok Danie Craven, who was impressed by the fullback's long and accurate kicking game. Craven came to coach van der Schyff at a local military academy, from where he gained Griqualand West representative honours.

When New Zealand toured in 1949, van der Schyff was the Springboks fullback for all four Test matches against the All Blacks, with goalkicking responsibilities falling to Okey Geffin. The Springboks swept the series 4–0.

In 1955, van der Schyff was recalled for the opening Test match against the British Lions at Ellis Park, and entrusted with the goal–kicking. He scored 10 points off his boot, but missed a straightforward conversion attempt of Theuns Briers's last minute try which allowed the Lions to hold on to a one–point win, costing him his place.

== See also ==
- List of South Africa national rugby union players
