= Roy Dryburgh =

South African rugby union footballer

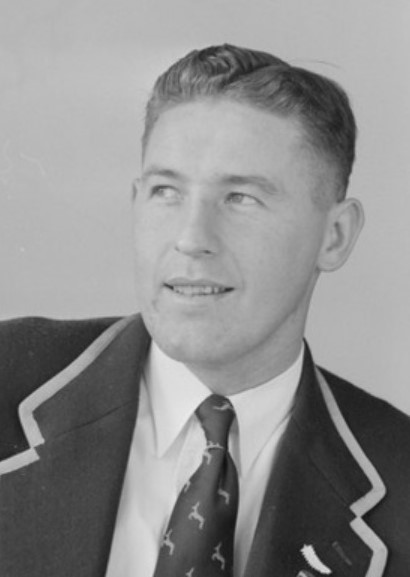
- Dryburgh in New Zealand in 1956
- Born: Royden Gladstone Dryburgh; 1 November 1929 Cape Town, South Africa
- Died: 10 May 2000 (aged 70) Durban, South Africa
- Height: 1.83 m (6 ft 0 in)
- Weight: 83 kg (183 lb)
- School: Grey High School, Port Elizabeth

Rugby union career
Amateur team(s)
Years	Team	Apps	(Points)
- Hamiltons RFC
- College Rovers
Provincial / State sides
Years	Team	Apps	(Points)
1949–1955	Western Province		
1956–1960	Natal		
International career
Years	Team	Apps	(Points)
1955–1960	South Africa	8	(28)

Royden Gladstone Dryburgh (1 November 1929 – 10 May 2000) was a South African rugby union player, who captained the Springboks in two test matches.

== Playing career ==
Dryburgh played provincial for Western Province from 1949 to 1955 and for Natal from 1956 to 1960.

Dryburgh made his test debut for the Springboks in 1955 against the touring British Lions team captained by Robin Thompson. His first test match was the second test played at his home ground, Newlands in Cape Town and he scored a try and two conversions in the test. In 1960 he was captained the Springboks in the first two tests against the touring All Blacks. Dryburg scored 28 points in test matches, including three tries. He also played in twelve tour matches, scoring eighty-eight points.

=== Test history ===
No.	Opponents	Results (SA 1st)	Position	Points	Dates	Venue
1.	British Lions	25–9	Fullback	7 (1 try, 2 conv)	20 Aug 1955	Newlands, Cape Town
2.	(British & Irish Lions) British Lions	6–9	Full back	6 (2 pen)	3 Sep 1955	Loftus Versfeld, Pretoria
3.	(British & Irish Lions) British Lions	22–8	Fullback	4 (2 conv)	24 Sep 1955	Crusaders Ground, Port Elizabeth
4.	Australia	9–0	Right-wing	3 (1 try)	2 Jun 1956	Brisbane Exhibition Ground, Brisbane
5.	New Zealand	6–10	Fullback	3 (1 pen)	14 Jul 1956	Carisbrook, Dunedin
6.	New Zealand	5–11	Right-wing	3 (1 try)	1 Sep 1956	Eden Park, Auckland
7.	New Zealand	13–0	Fullback (c)	2 (1 conv)	25 Jun 1960	Ellis Park, Johannesburg
8.	New Zealand	3–11	Fullback (c)		23 Jul 1960	Newlands, Cape Town

Legend: try (3 pts); pen = penalty (3 pts.); conv = conversion (2 pts.), drop = drop kick (3 pts.).

== See also ==
- List of South Africa national rugby union players – Springbok no. 321

Sporting positions
Preceded by Des van Jaarsveldt	Springbok Captain; 1960	Succeeded by Avril Malan
