= Tommy Gentles =

South African rugby union player

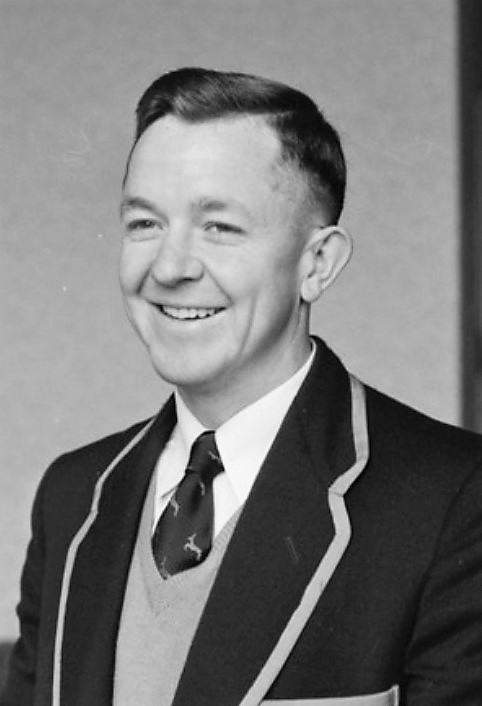
- Gentles in New Zealand in 1956
- Born: Thomas Alexander Gentles; 31 May 1934 Johannesburg, Transvaal, Union of South Africa
- Died: 29 June 2011 (aged 77) Johannesburg, South Africa
- Height: 1.61 m (5 ft 3 in)
- Weight: 61 kg (134 lb)
- School: Diocesan College
- University: University of Cape Town

Rugby union career
- Position: Scrumhalf
Amateur team(s)
| Years | Team | Apps | (Points) |
- Villager FC
Provincial / State sides
| Years | Team | Apps | (Points) |
| 1955–1958 | Western Province | | |
International career
| Years | Team | Apps | (Points) |
| 1955–1958 | South Africa | 6 | (0) |

Thomas Alexander Gentles (31 May 1934 – 29 June 2011) was a South African rugby union player.

== Playing career ==
Gentles was educated at Diocesan College (Bishops) and the University of Cape Town, where he gained a B.A. degree. He played provincial rugby for Western Province from 1955 to 1958.

Gentles made his test match debut for South Africa against Robin Thompson's British Lions side in 1955 at Ellis Park on 6 August 1955, in front of over 90,000 fans. He toured with the Springboks to Australia and New Zealand in 1956. Gentles and Popeye Strydom competed for the scrumhalf position and consequently played in two of the six Tests, during the tour. He also played in 12 tour matches and scored three tries.

=== Test history ===
| No. | Opponents | Results (SA 1st) | Position | Tries | Dates | Venue |
|---|---|---|---|---|---|---|
| 1. | British Lions | 25–9 | Scrumhalf | | 6 Aug 1955 | Ellis Park, Johannesburg |
| 2. | (British & Irish Lions) British Lions | 6–9 | Scrumhalf | | 20 Aug 1955 | Newlands, Cape Town |
| 3. | (British & Irish Lions) British Lions | 22–8 | Scrumhalf | | 24 Sep 1955 | Crusaders Ground, Port Elizabeth |
| 4. | New Zealand | 8–3 | Scrumhalf | | 4 Aug 1956 | Athletic Park, Wellington |
| 5. | New Zealand | 10–17 | Scrumhalf | | 18 Aug 1956 | Lancaster Park, Christchurch |
| 6. | France | 5–9 | Scrumhalf | | 16 Aug 1958 | Ellis Park, Johannesburg |

== See also ==
- List of South Africa national rugby union players – Springbok no. 316
