= Theuns Briers =

South African rugby union player

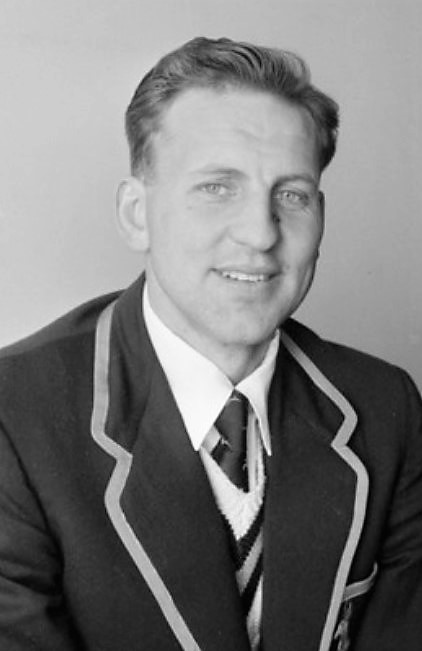
- Briers in New Zealand in 1956
- Born: Theunis Petrus Daniël Briers; 11 July 1929 Paarl, South Africa
- Died: 7 October 2018 (aged 89) Bloubergstrand, South Africa
- Height: 1.83 m (6 ft 0 in)
- Weight: 88.5 kg (195 lb)
- School: Paarl Boys' High School

Rugby union career
- Position: Wing
Amateur team(s)
Years	Team	Apps	(Points)
- Paarl RC
Provincial / State sides
Years	Team	Apps	(Points)
1953–1959	Western Province		
International career
Years	Team	Apps	(Points)
1955–1956	South Africa	7	(17)
1956	South Africa (tour)	5	(12)

Theunis Petrus Daniël Briers (11 July 1929 – 7 October 2018) was a South African rugby union player.

== Playing career ==
Briers matriculated at Paarl Boys' High School and played club rugby for the Paarl RC. He made his provincial debut for Western Province in 1953 was a member the Western Province Currie Cup winning teams in 1954 and 1959.

Briers made his test match debut for South Africa against Robin Thompson's British Lions side in 1955 at Ellis Park in front of over 90,000 fans and scored two tries. He initially declared himself unavailable for the Springbok tour to Australia and New Zealand in 1956, but was called up as a replacement and joined the tour in time for the second test against the All Blacks. Briers also played in 5 tour matches during the New Zealand leg of the tour and scored 4 tries.

=== Test history ===
No.	Opponents	Results (SA 1st)	Position	Tries	Dates	Venue
1.	British Lions	25–9	Wing	2	6 Aug 1955	Ellis Park, Johannesburg
2.	(British & Irish Lions) British Lions	6–9	Wing	1	20 Aug 1955	Newlands, Cape Town
3.	(British & Irish Lions) British Lions	6–9	Wing		3 Sep 1955	Loftus Versfeld, Pretoria
4.	(British & Irish Lions) British Lions	22–8	Wing	2	24 Sep 1955	Crusaders Ground, Port Elizabeth
5.	New Zealand	8–3	Wing		4 Aug 1956	Athletic Park, Wellington
6.	New Zealand	10–17	Wing		18 Aug 1956	Lancaster Park, Christchurch
7.	New Zealand	5–11	Wing		1 Sep 1956	Eden Park, Auckland

== See also ==
- List of South Africa national rugby union players – Springbok no. 313
