= Guadeloupe national rugby union team =

Guadeloupe
- Union: Comité Territorial de Rugby de Guadeloupe

First international
- Bermuda 30–3 Guadeloupe (Fort-de-France, Martinique; 31 October 1977)

Largest win
- Guadeloupe 43–12 Martinique (Basse-Terre, Guadeloupe; 24 March 2012)

Largest defeat
- Trinidad and Tobago 53–3 Guadeloupe (Georgetown, Guyana; 4 November 1979)

The Guadeloupe national rugby union team represents Guadeloupe in the sport of rugby union. Guadeloupe has been playing international rugby since the 1970s.

They have played mainly against Caribbean sides, i.e. Trinidad & Tobago, Bermuda, Guyana, and Barbados.

== Record ==
Below is a table of the representative rugby matches played by a Guadeloupe national XV at test level up until 21 September 2019, updated after match with Bermuda.

Opponent	Played	Won	Lost	Drawn	% Won
Bahamas	1	0	1	0	0%
Barbados	1	1	0	0	100%
Bermuda	3	0	3	0	0%
Cayman Islands	1	0	1	0	0%
Curaçao	1	0	1	0	0%
Dominican Republic	1	1	0	0	100%
Guyana	2	2	0	0	100%
Martinique	6	3	3	0	50%
Trinidad and Tobago	1	0	1	0	0%
Total	17	7	10	0	41.18%

== See also ==
- French Rugby Federation
- Comité Territorial de Rugby de Guadeloupe
- Rugby union in Guadeloupe
