= Rugby union in Martinique =

- Country: Martinique
- Governing body: French Rugby Federation; Comité Territorial de Rugby de la Martinique
- National team: Martinique

Rugby union in Martinique is a minor, but growing sport.

== Governing body ==
The Comité Territorial de Rugby de la Martinique is a committee under the umbrella of the French Rugby Federation which is the governing body for rugby union within French Guiana.

The committee is not affiliated to the IRB in its own right, but it is affiliated to NACRA, (formerly NAWIRA), which is the regional governing body for North America and the Caribbean.

== History ==
Rugby was introduced to Martinique by the French who colonised the area. More talented players tend to leave for Metropolitan France.

There have been occasional games against sides from the other Caribbean islands. Most of its rugby contacts are either with them, or with France itself.

Martinique competes in the NACRA Caribbean Championship, a tournament which includes Trinidad and Tobago, Bermuda, the Cayman Islands, Jamaica, the Bahamas, British Virgin Islands, Antigua and Guyana.

== See also ==
- Martinique national rugby union team
- Rugby union in France
