= Adam Jones (rugby union, born 1981) =

Welsh rugby union player (born 1981)

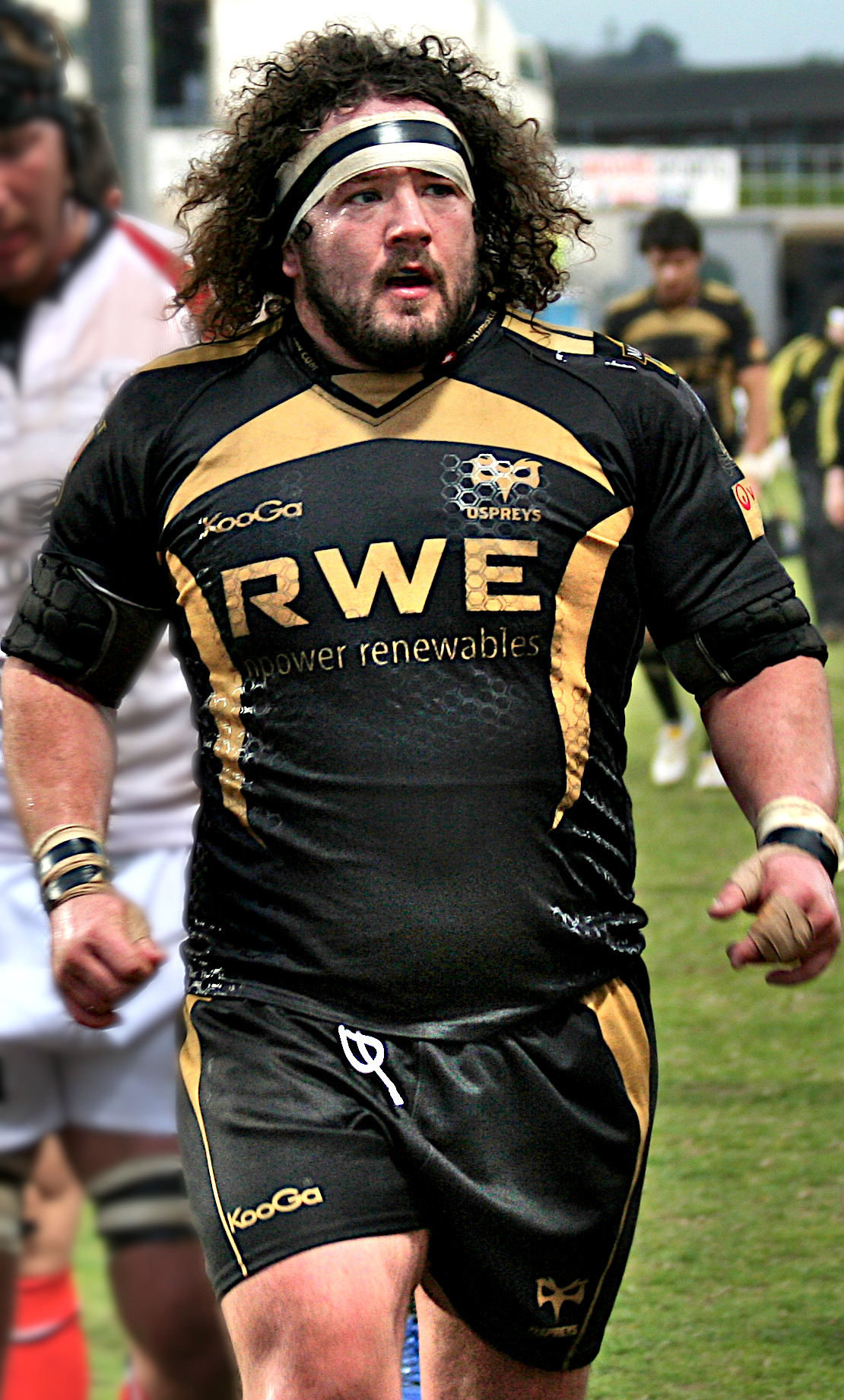
- Jones in 2010
- Born: Adam Rhys Jones; 8 March 1981 (age 45) Abercraf, Wales
- Height: 6 ft 0 in (183 cm)
- Weight: 120 kg (18 st 13 lb; 260 lb)
- School: Maesydderwen Comprehensive School, Coleg Sir Gar

Rugby union career
- Position: Prop
Senior career
Years	Team	Apps	(Points)
2000–2003	Neath	40	(10)
2003–2014	Ospreys	195	(15)
2014–2015	Cardiff Blues	24	(0)
2015–2018	Harlequins	30	(0)
- Correct as of 24 February 2017
International career
Years	Team	Apps	(Points)
2003–2014	Wales	95	(10)
2009, 2013	British & Irish Lions	5	(0)
2015	Barbarians	2	(0)
- Correct as of 14 June 2014
Coaching career
- Years: Team
- 2018–: Harlequins (Scrum Coach)
- 2025: Wales (Scrum consultant)

Adam Rhys Jones (born 8 March 1981) is a Welsh former professional international rugby union player for Wales and the British & Irish Lions. He is currently scrum coach for Premiership Rugby club Harlequins and scrum consultant for Wales for the 2025 Six Nations.

He is one of a small group of Welsh players to have won three Grand Slams, including Gerald Davies, Gareth Edwards, J. P. R. Williams, Ryan Jones, Gethin Jenkins and Alun Wyn Jones.

== Club career ==
Jones began his career with Neath before switching to the Ospreys with the regionalisation of Welsh rugby in 2003.

In his early career Jones was often criticised for a lack of scrummaging power, but he has answered those critics with several seasons of dogged and dependable work in the front row of both Wales and the Ospreys. He developed the ability to scrum very low, and to manipulate his weight positioning, in order to drive the loosehead's head towards his left knee.

After the 2013–14 season, Jones left the Ospreys, refusing to sign a new contract until a dispute between the Welsh regions and the WRU was resolved. On 19 August 2014, he was unveiled as a new signing by Cardiff Blues.

On 26 March 2015, it was announced that Jones would join Aviva Premiership side Harlequins from the 2015–16 season. Jones played for Harlequins until the end of the 2017–18 season, increasingly moving from playing to coaching during that time. Notably, on 8 October 2016, Jones was called up to the bench as a very late replacement for the game against Northampton Saints. Following a very early injury in the game Jones ended-up having to play nearly the whole match at loosehead, to considerable praise.

Jones announced his complete retirement from the game on 25 March 2018, effective from the end of the 2017–18 season.

== International career ==
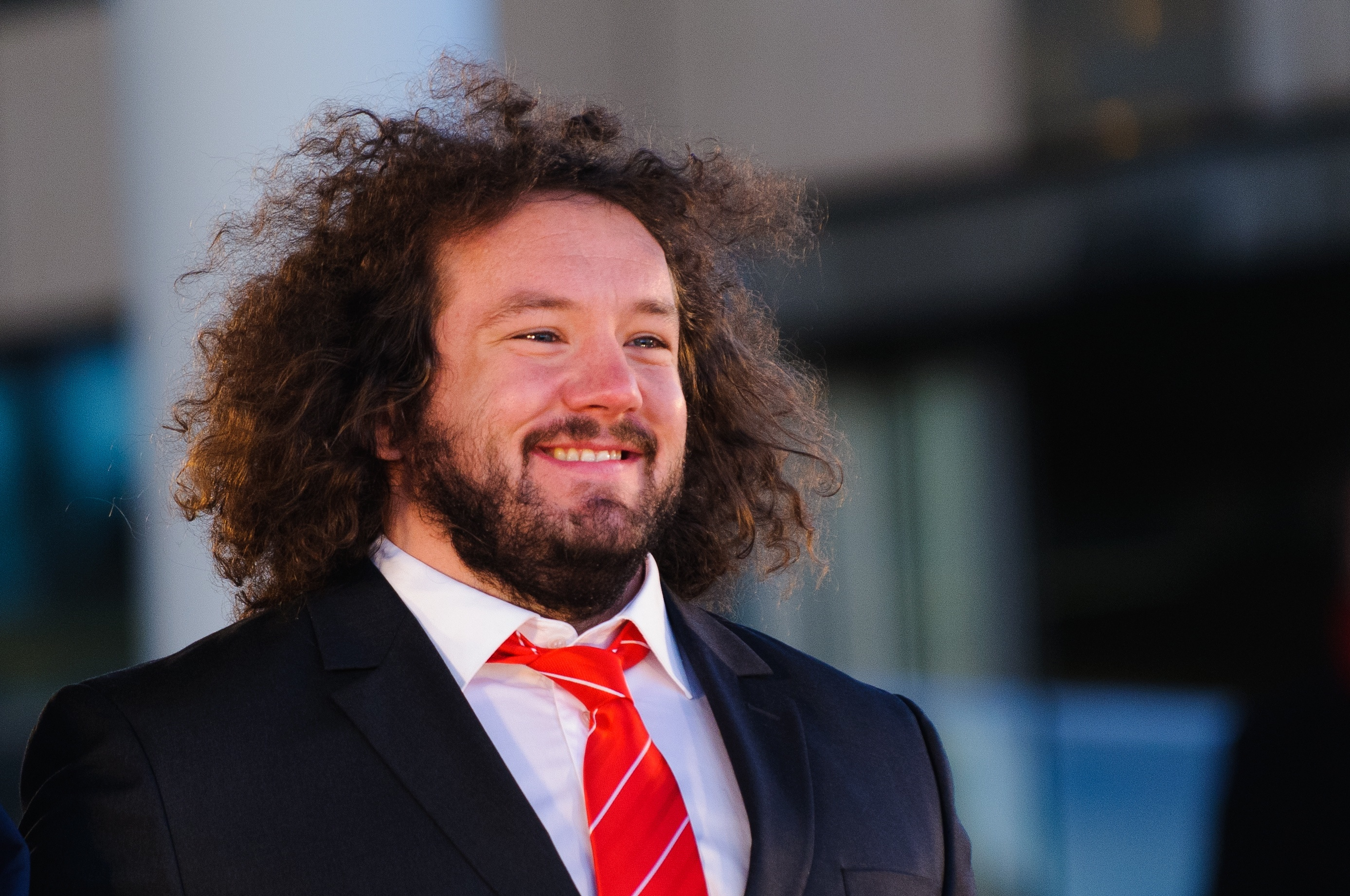
Jones at the Senedd during the Wales Grand Slam Celebration in 2012

Following several successful seasons at club level, Jones received a call up to the Wales squad in 2003, making his debut as a replacement against England during the 2003 Six Nations.

Jones almost immediately pinned down the No.3 jersey and was selected for Wales' World Cup squad at the end of 2003. He featured in all of Wales' games at the tournament, starting in the crucial group games against Italy and New Zealand and the quarter final loss to England. At the time, fears over Jones' fitness led to him only playing the first half of games, a trend that he emphatically ended as his career developed.

Jones continued to hold down the starting tighthead spot through the 2004 Six Nations and autumn Internationals. In 2005, Jones was a key member of the Welsh Grand Slam-winning side, starting all five of Wales' games en route to their historic achievement, it was alongside Gethin Jenkins that he provided a platform for the side in 2005.

Jones was a solid presence during the 2006 Six Nations, and was also one of the senior squad members for Wales' summer tour to Argentina. Following a difficult tournament for Wales in the 2007 Six Nations, Jones was selected for his second World Cup in the autumn of 2007.

In that year's World Cup Jones played in the group stage against Canada and Australia, but was dropped in favour of Worcester's Chris Horsman for the crucial final group game against Fiji. Bouncing back from the disappointment of the World Cup, Jones played in four of Wales' games on their way to the Grand Slam in the 2008 Six Nations.

Jones' improvement under the guidance of Warren Gatland saw him selected for the 2009 British & Irish Lions tour to South Africa and he made the squad for the first Test in Durban. After shoring up the Lions' retreating scrum in the first Test, Jones started the narrow second Test loss to South Africa in Pretoria. In June 2009 Gethin Jenkins, Jones and Matthew Rees were selected as the British & Irish Lions front row for the 2nd Test against South Africa. This was the first time an all-Welsh front row was selected for a Lions test match since Billy Williams, Bryn Meredith and Courtney Meredith on the 1955 Lions tour. Jones was sent home after the 2nd test match with South Africa in which they lost 28–25 after dislocating his right shoulder. Jones was sidelined for six months with the injury and had surgery on torn shoulder ligaments. During the two Tests, Jones was on the field for 81 minutes, during which the British Lions scored 30 points and conceded 15. In his absence, the Lions scored 16 points and conceded 39.

His effort was ended by a dislocated shoulder suffered during the game after a challenge from Springboks lock Bakkies Botha and he was ruled out of the third Test. Jones' shoulder injury came after Botha attempted to clear him from a ruck and the Bulls star was subsequently cited and banned for two weeks for the challenge. Jones was ruled out for six weeks with the injury, returning for the Ospreys at Christmas in 2009 and for Wales ahead of the 2010 Six Nations. Jones is well known for his front row partnership at the Ospreys and Wales with Duncan Jones (no relation). Together, they are affectionately known as the "Hair Bears", because of their recognisable hairdos.

In the May 2010 edition of Rugby World, it was reported he has 'slimmed down' to a 'svelte' 19 stones by cutting out junk food, beer and gaining focus in training.

In January 2011 the Ospreys prop was injured in the first half of the region's Heineken Cup loss to London Irish and scans confirmed ligament damage and a lay-off of eight weeks. He returned to the Wales squad for their final Six Nations match against France.

In August 2011 Jones was named in the 30-man squad for the Rugby World Cup in New Zealand. The Welsh team performed admirably, reaching the semi-finals. Jones played a vital role in providing a platform for Wales' exciting backs to score many tries. He played against South Africa, Samoa, Fiji and Ireland before injuring his calf within the first 10 minutes of the semi-final against France.

He returned to full fitness in December 2011, and did enough to earn selection for Wales' 35-man squad for the training camp in Poland prior to the 2012 Six Nations.

He was part of the 37-man squad for the 2013 British & Irish Lions tour to Australia.

On 24 January 2015, Jones announced his retirement from international rugby.

=== International tries ===
Try	Opponent	Location	Venue	Competition	Date	Result
1	Scotland	Cardiff, Wales	Millennium Stadium	2004 Six Nations	14 February 2004	Win
2	England	London, England	Twickenham	2010 Six Nations	6 February 2010	Loss

== Quiz show appearances ==
Jones has appeared on a number of TV shows in the UK, especially quiz shows. Jones appeared as a contestant on seven episodes of A Question of Sport, where he achieved the record number of correct answers for a contestant in a single episode, with eighteen out of eighteen. Jones would later appear on Celebrity Mastermind, competing for St David's Hospice in Newport and getting another perfect score of twelve out of twelve on his chosen subject, The British and Irish Lions tours 1993-2005.

In 2023 Jones appeared on S4C's Iaith ar Daith (English: language journey) where he was mentored in the Welsh language by former teammate Mike Phillips. In 2024 Jones appeared on The Chase again competing for St David's Hospice for whom he is a charity ambassador.

== Coaching career ==
Since 2018, Jones has been Harlequins Scrum and Transition coach.

In January 2025, he joined the Wales coaching staff, on a secondment basis from Harlequins, as a scrum consultant ahead of the 2025 Six Nations.
