= Jeppe High School for Boys =

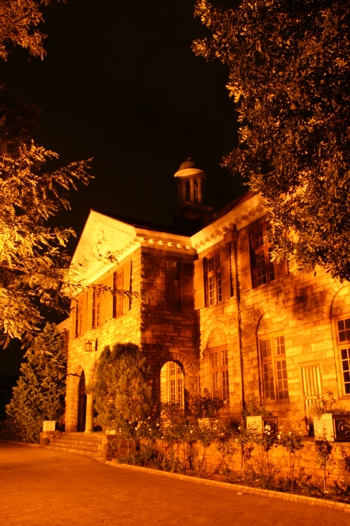
- Jeppe High School for Boys main entrance

Location
- Good Hope & Roberts Avenue; Kensington, Gauteng 2101; South Africa; 26°12′0″S 28°5′58″E

Information
- School type: All-boys public school
- Motto: "Forti Nihil Difficilius" (Nothing is too difficult for the brave)
- Religious affiliation: Christianity not officially affiliated with any religion
- Established: 1890; 136 years ago
- Founder: Sir Julius Jeppe
- Sister school: Jeppe High School for Girls
- School board: National Senior Certificate
- School district: D9.
- School number: GDE No. 130633
- Headmaster: Mr Brendan Gittins
- Grades: 8–12
- Gender: Male
- Language: English
- Schedule: 08:00 - 14:20
- Campus: Urban Campus
- Campus type: Suburban
- Colours: Black; Gold; White
- Slogan: Turning Black and White into Gold
- Song: [Jeppe School Song]
- Mascot: Zebra
- Nickname: Jeppe
- Rivals: King Edward VII School; Parktown Boys' High School; Pretoria Boys High School; St Benedict's College, Bedfordview; St John's College, Johannesburg
- Accreditation: Gauteng Department of Education
- School fees: R75000 per annum
- Affiliation: International Boys' Schools Coalition
- Alumni: Jeppe Old Boys
- Dayboy Houses: Duiker, Eland, Impala, Koodoo, Roan
- Boarding Houses: Oribi, Tsessebe, Sable, Droste
- Website: www.jeppeboys.co.za

Jeppe High School for Boys is a public English medium high school for boys in Kensington, a suburb of Johannesburg in the Gauteng province of South Africa. It is one of the 23 Milner Schools, and its sister school is Jeppe High School for Girls.

The school's motto is the Latin Forti nihil difficilius, meaning "Nothing is too difficult for the brave". Jeppe High School for Boys is the oldest known school in Johannesburg.

== History ==
St. Michael's College was the predecessor of all the Jeppe Schools. This was an Anglican private school on the corner of Commissioner and Crowns Street in Fairview. There were 25 students when the school first opened in 1890. The headmaster of the school was Rev. H B Sidwell. His successor was Rev. George Perry, in 1891.

The buildings of the college and the site on which its grounds lay were bought by the Witwatersrand Council for education, in 1896, as the school was struggling to function. The school was re-opened, in April 1897, by the council as Jeppestown Grammar School. Fifteen boys enrolled into the school and the first headmaster of the school was Mr. H Hardwick. However, school financial issues forced the council to reduce its disbursement. As a result, Mr. Hardwick and the rest of the school's staff were given notice. On 1 October 1898, a group of Jeppestown parents bought the school from the council for £2,500. The staff had been replaced, but Mr. Hardwick remained the headmaster of the school.

In 1899, at the outbreak of the Anglo-Boer War, with the number of students slowly decreasing, the school was forced to close down. Mr. Hardwick left in September 1899.

The school re-opened, after the war, as Jeppestown High School for Girls and Boys using land donated by Sir Julius Jeppe. It was opened in the same building of the Grammar School, and was one of the first co-educational schools, opened by the Transvaal Education Department (T.E.D). The precise date of the re-opening is unknown, however it is believed to have been during the first quarter of the year 1902, as a letter sent to the Department of Education by the school, about the teachers being unwilling to teach under the conditions of an unfinished building as well as there not being enough space for the number of children, was sent on 9 April of that year.

The Parents' Committee experienced financial hardships at the same time as the school's construction. In September 1902, the Education Department was presented with an ultimatum, which stated that either they purchase the premises or vacate it, by October that year. The Public Works Department advised that purchase be made, until a new school building could be constructed.

The new headmaster of the school, in 1902, was Mr. C D Hope. He remained headmaster until he left in 1904 to found a fellow "Milner School", Potchefstroom High School for Boys. He was succeeded by Mr. J H Payne, who became a staff member in 1902 and remained headmaster until his death, in 1917, during his service in the First World War (170 boys and staff members died in the border conflicts and two World Wars). Mr. Payne acquired the building that the Jeppe Boys students currently occupy.

By 1912 the new school's grounds were insufficient for the growing number of pupils at the school. Owing to the boys out-numbering the girls, and pressure from the Governing Body of the school, who were against the co-educational system of the school, it was decided that the girls would be moved to other premises. The split would occur in 1919.

When Johannesburg celebrated its centenary, in 1986, the main building of Jeppe High School for Boys, as well as the First World War Memorial, were declared national monuments.

== Current administration ==
Headmaster | Principal

- Mr. Brendan Gittins

== War Memorial ==
A dome built near the main entrance of the school is one of the prominent facades of the school building. One side of the dome is used for "recruiting" and the other as the school museum. Alongside the dome can be found the names of boys who died during the war while still attending the school. The dome also features a plinth with the names of staff and pupils who were killed in The Great War. Mr. James Humphrey Allen Payne, who was a headmaster at the school, died of a fever in 1917 while serving in the war. The second hall in the school is named after him.

When the school celebrated its centenary in 1986, the First World War Memorial, which was opened by field Marshal Jan Smuts, was declared a national monument.

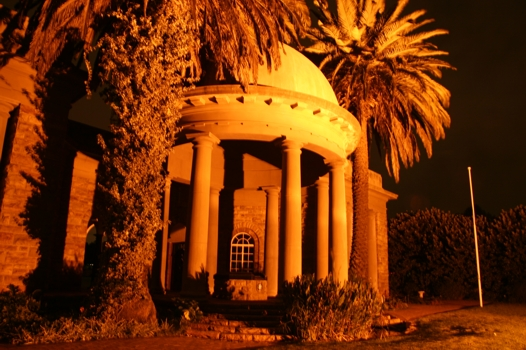

== Buildings and facilities ==
=== Hostel ===
In 1912, Oribi House, the oldest hostel, was built. In 1916, Tsessebe House now called Sable House occupied Friedenheim, Sir Julius Jeppe's home. During the Anglo-Boer War, Friedenheim was used as British Headquarters and was owned by Sir Abe Bailey. In the early 1960s, Friedenheim was declared unsafe to occupy and was demolished.

== Main gates ==
The main gates to the school are dedicated to FWB von Linsingen and AS Dashwood who were both killed in action in Bardia on 31 December 1941.

== World War II Rolls of Honour ==
Two World War II plaques are situated in the foyer of the school's main hall. These contain the names of Jeppe pupils who died in action while still attending the school.

== Jeppe High School for Boys Association ==
There have been a number of different Old Boy Associations over the years at Jeppe High School for Boys. However, over time they had become defunct, in 2009 the Jeppe High School for Boys Association (JBA) was officially formed.

The stated aims of the JBA are as follows:

- To communicate with Old Boys and members of the Jeppe family through monthly newsletters and the JBA website as to the activities, achievements, developments and progress of the School.
- To facilitate continued interaction amongst the Old Boy network by assisting with reunions and various fundraising events.
- To become the “business advisory” arm of the School by acting as a conduit for the School to interact with the many areas of business acumen and expertise which exist within the Jeppe family.
- To contribute to the continued high standards of academic, sporting and cultural performances at the School and the high levels of discipline and behaviour by raising finances to support the various capital projects at the School.
- To give underprivileged and financially disadvantaged scholars, of all races, the opportunity to attend Jeppe through the establishment and maintenance of the various Scholarship Funds.

== Academics ==
Jeppe Boys write the Gauteng Department of Education preliminarily examinations and the Department of Education, South Africa final examination via the FET (Further Education Training) board. They are also offered the opportunity to partake in Advanced Programme mathematics, which is written separately under the IEB.

== Scholarships ==
Jake White Scholarship Fund - The Jake White Scholarship, named after Jake White who was a pupil at the school from Grade 8 to Grade 12, aims to brand all sports scholarships at the school under this fund.

White, who is a former Springbok and IRB World Cup Winning Coach, and Jeppe old boy, was a prominent figure in the Springboks' victory in 2007 during the Rugby World Cup.

Theo Jackson Scholarship Fund - The Theo Jackson Scholarship Fund, established by Dale and Craig Jackson in 2006 in honour of their late father, Theo Jackson, is a separate scholarship within the JBA association. The scholarship aims to grant scholarships to boys of all races and from disadvantaged backgrounds. Recipients of the scholarship are not chosen based on academic or sporting excellence but rather on strength of character and the will to succeed despite a disadvantaged background.

100 Club - The 100 Club, formed in 2004, aims to improve sports, academics, facilities and infrastructure at Jeppe Boys through donations from Jeppe old Boys.

== Extramural activities ==
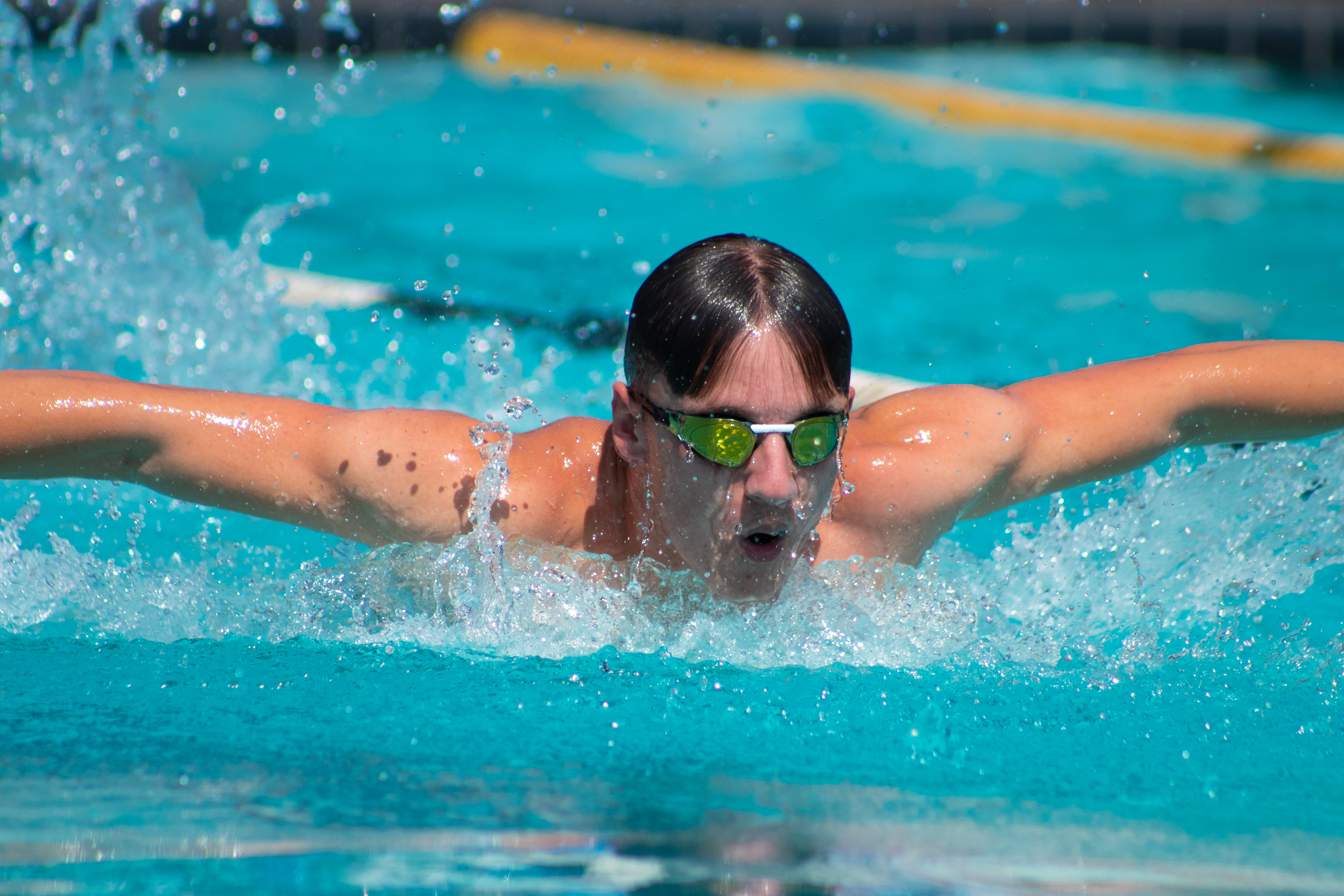
Swimming at Jeppe High School for Boys.

Listed alphabetically according to season

| Summer | Winter | Both |
|---|---|---|
| Aquatics (Rowing, Swimming, Water Polo) | Athletics | Chess |
| Basketball | Cross-Country | Choir |
| Cricket | Hockey | Comic and Cards Club |
| Golf | Rugby | Creative Writing Society |
| Orienteering | Football (soccer) | Debating |
| Rowing | Mountain Biking | Emergency Medical Care |
| Squash | | JAM (Jesus and Me) |
| Table Tennis | | JJC (Jo'burg Junior Council) |
| Tennis | | Pipe Band |
| | | eSports |
| | | Performing Arts |
| | | Public Speaking |
| | | Photography Club |
| | | Wildlife Club |

== Academics ==
Jeppe Boys write the Gauteng Department of Education preliminarily examinations and the Department of Education, South Africa final examination via the FET (Further Education Training) board.

=== Subjects ===
In line with the requirements of the Education Department, Jeppe High School for Boys offers the following subjects in the Junior and Senior Phase:

| | Junior Phase (Grades 8 & 9) | Senior Phase (Grades 10 -12) |
|---|---|---|
| English | X | X |
| Afrikaans | X | X |
| IsiZulu | X | X |
| Mathematics | X | X |
| Mathematical Literacy | | X |
| Advanced Programme Mathematics | | X |
| Natural Science | X | |
| Life Science | | X |
| Physical Science | | X |
| HSS (Human and Social Sciences – History and Geography) | X | |
| History | | X |
| Geography | | X |
| Technology | X | |
| Engineering Graphics & Design | | X |
| Life Orientation | X | X |
| Accounting | | X |
| Business Studies | | X |
| Physical Education | X | X |
| Information Technology | | X |
| Art and Culture | X | |
| Visual Art | | X |
| Dramatic Arts | | |

== School buildings ==
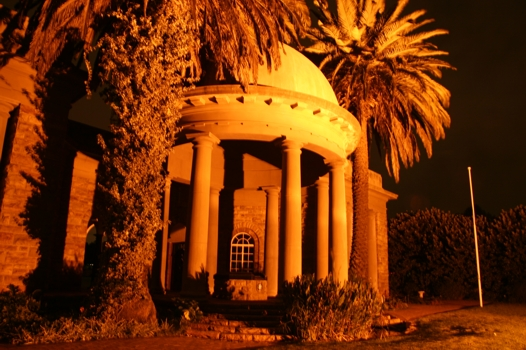

Jeppe Boys has stone buildings with a prominent facade. The Payne Hall, a stone building with a largely wooden interior, has been declared a national monument. Within the school is another national monument; a war memorial dedicated to those who died in the First World War.

== Prominent Old Boys ==
- Herman Charles Bosman (1905–1951), writer and journalist
- Bob Hepple (1934–2015), legal adviser to Nelson Mandela in his trial for incitement in 1962
- Samuel Kinkead (1897–1928), air ace and Schneider Trophy pilot
- Joel Mandelstam (1919–2008), British microbiologist
- Henry John May (1903–1995), author, noted South African constitutional lawyer, and Queen's Counsel
- Lebogang Naves (DJ Naves) (born 1984), DJ & radio presenter
- Cecil Pugh, GC (1898–1941), clergyman and George Cross recipient
- Marius Schoon (1937–1999), anti-apartheid activist
- Harry Schwarz (1924–2010), lawyer, politician, South African Ambassador to the United States and anti-apartheid leader
- Garth Shelton (1956), Author and Professor of International Relations, University of the Witwatersrand.
- Otsile Nkadimeng (born 2004), climate activist and entrepreneur

=== Sportsmen ===
- Jaydon Brooker (born 2005), South African field hockey and cricket player
- Jock Cameron (1905–1935), South African international wicket-keeper
- Bob Catterall (1900–1961), South African Test cricketer
- Jim Christy (1904–1971), South African international opening batsman
- Laurence Stegmann (born 1958) Springbok swimmer
- James Dalton (born 1972), Springbok hooker
- Hacjivah Dayimani (born 1997), Lions Flanker
- Norman Gordon (1911–2014) South African cricketer who participated in the famous "timeless test"
- Morgan Gould (born 1983), soccer player
- Tyrone Green (born 1998), former Junior Springbok. Lions Utility back
- Daryl Impey (born 1984), South African professional road cyclist
- Alan Kourie (born 1951), played cricket for South Africa in 16 unofficial Tests
- Brian Mitchell (born 1961), World Junior Lightweight Champion Boxer
- S'busiso Romeo Nkosi (born 1996), Springbok winger
- Fhatuwani 'Rasta' Rasivhenge (born 1986), International Rugby Board referee
- Wilf Rosenberg (1934–2019), Springbok outside centre
- Wandisile Simelane (born 1998), former Junior Springbok. Lions centre
- Des Sinclair (1927–1996), Springbok inside centre
- Jake White (born 1963), World Cup (2007) winning Springbok coach, who also taught at the school
