= 1980 Italy rugby union tour of the United States, New Zealand and the South Pacific =

Summary
P	W	D	L
Total
9	3	0	6
Test match
3	0	0	3
Opponent
P	W	D	L
Fiji
1	0	0	1
Cook Islands
1	0	0	1
Junior All Blacks
1	0	0	1

The 1980 Italy rugby union tour of the United States, New Zealand and the South Pacific was a series of matches played from 11 June–8 July 1980 in the United States, South Pacific Islands and New Zealand by the Italian rugby union team.

It was the first Italian team tour to New Zealand and followed 7 years after the tour in South Africa in 1973.

Italy lost six matches and won three.

== Results ==
Scores and results list Italy's points tally first.

Opposing Team	For	Against	Date	Venue	Status
Grizzlies (Pacific Coast RU)	9	18	11 June 1980	Long Beach	Tour match
Fiji	3	16	14 June 1980	Suva	Test match
Nelson Bays	9	13	21 June 1980	Nelson	Tour match
Wairarapa Bush	13	9	25 June 1980	Masterton	Tour match
Taranaki	9	30	28 June 1980	New Plymouth	Tour match
Horowhenua	21	12	2 July 1980	Levin	Tour match
Junior All Blacks	12	30	5 July 1980	Auckland	Test match
Cook Islands	6	15	5 July 1980	Avarua	Test match
Tahiti	74	0	8 July 1980	Papeete	Tour match

== Bibliography ==
- (in Italian) Valerio Vecchiarelli, Francesco Volpe, 2000, Italia in meta, GS editore, 2000.
