= Avril Malan =

South African rugby union footballer

- Born: Avril Stefan Malan; 9 April 1937 (age 89) Pretoria, Gauteng
- Height: 1.85 m (6 ft 1 in)
- Weight: 95 kg (209 lb)
- School: Hoërskool Wonderboom, Pretoria
- University: Stellenbosch University

Rugby union career
Amateur team(s)
Years	Team	Apps	(Points)
- Maties
- Diggers RFC
Provincial / State sides
Years	Team	Apps	(Points)
1957–1959	Western Province		
1960–1965	Transvaal		
International career
Years	Team	Apps	(Points)
1960–1965	South Africa	16	

Avril Stefan Malan (born 9 April 1937) is a former South African rugby union player.

== Playing career ==
Malan completed school at the age of sixteen, after which he furthered his studies at Stellenbosch University. He made his senior provincial debut for Western Province in 1957 and after completing his studies he relocated to Johannesburg and continued his playing career with Transvaal.

Malan made his test debut for the Springboks in 1960 against the touring New Zealand team in the first test played on 25 June 1960 at Ellis Park in Johannesburg. Later during the 1960 test series against the All Blacks, for the third and fourth Tests, Malan was named Springbok captain. He continued to captain the Springboks on ten occasions, though not continuously. He also played in twenty tour matches, scoring one try.

=== Test history ===
No.	Opponents	Results (SA 1st)	Position	Tries	Dates	Venue
1.	New Zealand	13–0	Lock		25 Jun 1960	Ellis Park, Johannesburg
2.	New Zealand	3–11	Lock		23 Jul 1960	Newlands, Cape Town
3.	New Zealand	11–11	Lock (c)		13 Aug 1960	Free State Stadium, Bloemfontein
4.	New Zealand	8–3	Lock (c)		27 Aug 1960	Boet Erasmus Stadium, Port Elizabeth
5.	Wales	3–0	Lock (c)		3 Dec 1960	Cardiff Arms Park, Cardiff
6.	Ireland	8–3	Lock (c)		17 Dec 1960	Lansdowne Road, Dublin
7.	England	5–0	Lock (c)		07 Jan 1961	Twickenham, London
8.	Scotland	12–5	Lock (c)		21 Jan 1961	Murrayfield, Edinburgh
9.	France	0–0	Lock (c)		18 Feb 1961	Colombes Stadium, Paris
10.	British Lions	3–3	Lock		23 Jun 1962	Ellis Park, Johannesburg
11.	Australia	14–3	Lock		13 Jul 1963	Loftus Versfeld, Pretoria
12.	Australia	5–9	Lock		10 Aug 1963	Newlands, Cape Town
13.	Australia	9–11	Lock (c)		24 Aug 1963	Ellis Park, Johannesburg
14.	Wales	24–3	Lock		23 May 1964	Kings Park, Durban
15.	Ireland	6–9	Lock (c)		10 Apr 1965	Lansdowne Road, Dublin
16.	Scotland	5–8	Lock (c)		17 April 1965	Murrayfield, Edinburgh

== See also ==
- List of South Africa national rugby union players – Springbok no. 361

Sporting positions
Preceded by Roy Dryburgh	Springbok Captain; 1960–61, 1963, 1965	Succeeded by Abie Malan
