= Russell Robins =

Lions & Wales international rugby union & league footballer (1932–2019)

Russell John Robins
Personal information
- Full name: Russell John Robins
- Born: 21 February 1932; Pontypridd, Wales
- Died: 27 September 2019 (aged 87)

Playing information

Rugby union
- Position: Lock, Flanker, Number eight
Club
Years	Team	Pld	T	G	FG	P
1949–59	Pontypridd RFC	184
1956–57	Barbarian F.C.	4
	Total	188	0	0	0	0
Representative
Years	Team	Pld	T	G	FG	P
1953–57	Wales	13	1	0	0	3
1955	British Lions	4	0	0	0	0

Rugby league
Club
Years	Team	Pld	T	G	FG	P
1959–≥59	Leeds
- Source: scrum.com

Russell John Robins (21 February 1932 – 27 September 2019) was a Welsh rugby union, and professional rugby league footballer who played in the 1940s and 1950s. He played representative level rugby union (RU) for British Lions and Wales, and at club level for Pontypridd RFC, as a Lock, Flanker, or Number eight, and club level rugby league (RL) for Leeds.

== Background ==
Robins was born in Pontypridd, Wales in 1932.

He was educated at Pontypridd Grammar School. Robins worked for the National Coal Board, but after completing his national service he became a lecturer for the Army. On switching codes from rugby union he became a professional rugby league footballer. In the 1960/70s he was a maths teacher at the Army Apprentice College at Chepstow where he coached the rugby team and also played for the staff team.

== International honours ==
Russell Robins won caps for Wales (RU) while at Pontypridd RFC in 1953 against Scotland, in 1954 against France, and Scotland, in 1955 against England, Scotland, Ireland, and France, in 1956 against England, and France, and in 1957 against England, Scotland, Ireland, and France, and won caps for British Lions (RU) while at Pontypridd RFC on the 1955 British Lions tour to South Africa against South Africa (4 matches).
