= Clive Ulyate =

South African sportsman

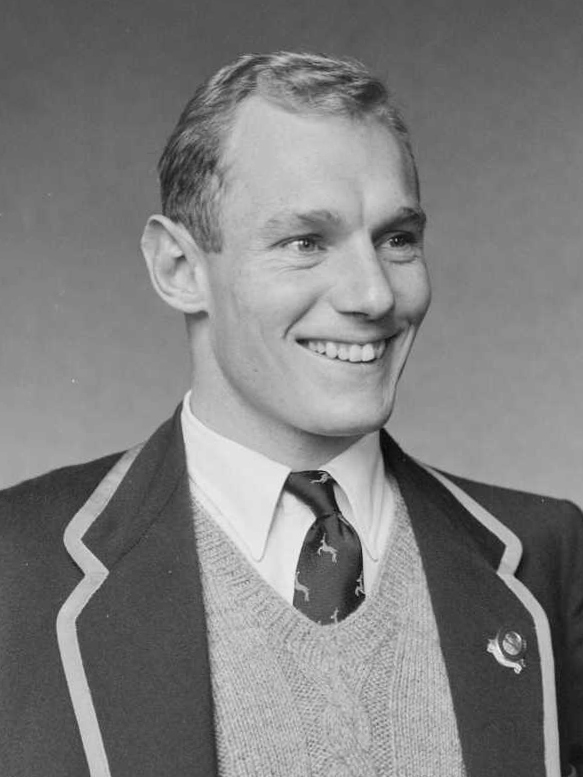
- Ulyate in New Zealand in 1956
- Born: Clive Anthony Ulyate; 11 December 1933 Johannesburg, Transvaal, South Africa
- Died: 18 March 2018 (aged 84) Virginia, Free State
- School: Hilton College
- University: University of the Witwatersrand

Rugby union career
- Position: Fly-half
Provincial / State sides
Years	Team	Apps	(Points)
1953–1957	Transvaal		
International career
Years	Team	Apps	(Points)
1955–56	South Africa	7	(6)

Clive Anthony Ulyate (11 December 1933 – 18 March 2018) was a South African sportsman who played international rugby union for South Africa. He also played first-class cricket, provincial hockey and provincial squash.

== Rugby union career ==
Ulyate, a fly-half, played his early rugby at Hilton College, before moving on to the University of Witwatersrand RFC. He would later play provincially for Transvaal. He was capped four times for South Africa during the British Lions tour of South Africa in 1955. In the Test in Port Elizabeth, which the Springboks won, Ulyate scored a try and kicked a drop goal. He played three further Tests for South Africa, in their 1956 tour of New Zealand.

=== Test history ===
No.	Opponents	Results (SA 1st)	Position	Points	Dates	Venue
1.	British Lions	25–9	Flyhalf		6 Aug 1955	Ellis Park, Johannesburg
2.	(British & Irish Lions) British Lions	6–9	Flyhalf		20 Aug 1955	Newlands, Cape Town
3.	(British & Irish Lions) British Lions	22–8	Flyhalf		3 Sep 1955	Loftus Versfeld, Pretoria
4.	(British & Irish Lions) British Lions	22–8	Flyhalf	6 (1 try, 1 dg)	24 Sep 1955	Crusaders Ground, Port Elizabeth
5.	New Zealand	6–10	Flyhalf		14 Jul 1956	Carisbrook, Dunedin
6.	New Zealand	8–3	Flyhalf		4 Aug 1956	Athletic Park, Wellington
7.	New Zealand	10–17	Flyhalf		18 Aug 1956	Lancaster Park, Christchurch

Legend: try (3 pts); pen = penalty (3 pts.); conv = conversion (2 pts.), dg = dropgoal (3 pts.).

== Cricket career ==
He was an all-rounder on the cricket field and played four first-class matches. His first appearance was in the 1955/56 Currie Cup season, playing for Transvaal against Natal. He had minimal impact on the match but did claim the wicket of Test opener Trevor Goddard. It was until 1964, with Eastern Province, that he played another first-class match. He played once for Eastern Province in 1964/65 and then appeared twice for them in the 1965/66 Currie Cup. His best performance came in the 1964/65 fixture, which was against North Eastern Transvaal. He scored the only half-century of his career, 55, in the first innings and then took 3/58.

== See also ==
- List of South Africa national rugby union players – Springbok no. 315
