= Otsile Nkadimeng =

South African climate activist

- Born: Otsile Nkadimeng; 2004 (age 21–22); Johannesburg, Gauteng, South Africa
- Education: Jeppe High School for Boys
- Occupations: Activist; youth leader; podcaster
- Years active: 2022–present
- Organisations: Sundial Movement; Fridays for Future

Otsile Nkadimeng (born 2004) is a South African climate activist and youth leader. He is widely recognized for his efforts to promote environmental justice and climate change. He is the co-founder of the Sundial Movement and leading organiser of the Fridays for Future South Africa.

== Career ==
Nkadimeng has built a career around youth development and environmental advocacy. He is currently the executive director of So We Vote, an organisation dedicated to educate young voters in South Africa. Through his work, he helps young people engage critically with political processes and understand their democratic rights. In 2025, he co-founded a podcast "Born Free" with Khumo Kumalo. He is currently a member of the Youth Advisor to the Embassy of Sweden and a fellow member of the International Youth Think Tank.

== Activisim ==
Nkadimeng is a leading organiser of the Fridays for Future South Africa, where he coordinates climate strikes and awareness campaigns. He also co-founded the Sundial Movement, a network connecting high school students across the country to take collective climate action. His activism focuses on climate education, youth led initiatives and social justice where he highlighted the environmental sustainability and everyday community issues.

Nkadimeng has participated in national and international platforms, including Model United Nations conference hosted by the SA Institute Of International Affairs youth programme when he was in Grade 8.

== Accolades and recognition ==
In 2023, Nkadimeng was named among the News24 100 Young Mandelas of the Future class of 2023.
