= Martinique Rugby Committee =

Branch of French Rugby Federation in Martinique

Comité Territorial de Rugby de la Martinique
- Sport: Rugby union
- Website: ctrm.clubeo.com

The Martinique Rugby Committee (French: Comité de Rugby de la Martinique, —or officially: Comité Territorial de Rugby de la Martinique) is a committee under the umbrella of the French Rugby Federation which is the governing body for rugby union within Martinique.

It is affiliated with NACRA, which is the regional governing body for North America and the Caribbean, but it is not affiliated with the World Rugby in its own right.

== National teams ==
As an overseas department of France, Martinique can participate in international competition, but not for the Rugby World Cup. Martinique has thus far played in the NACRA Caribbean Championship.

== See also ==
- Rugby union in Martinique
- Martinique national rugby union team
