= Gareth Griffiths (rugby union) =

British Lions & Wales international rugby union footballer

- Born: Gareth Meredith Griffiths; 27 November 1931 Penygraig, Wales
- Died: 8 December 2016 (aged 85)
- School: Porth County School
- University: Loughborough College

Rugby union career
- Position: Wing
Amateur team(s)
Years	Team	Apps	(Points)
- Loughborough College
–	Dinas Powys		
–	Cardiff RFC		
–	London Welsh RFC		
–	Barbarian F.C.		
–	Devon		
International career
Years	Team	Apps	(Points)
1953-1957	Wales	12	(15)
1955	British Lions	3	(0)

Gareth Meredith Griffiths (27 November 1931 – 8 December 2016) was a Wales international rugby union player.

Griffiths made his debut for Wales on 17 January 1953 versus England and was selected for the 1955 British Lions tour to South Africa. He played club rugby for Cardiff RFC.He played in both the Cardiff and Wales teams that defeated the New Zealand All Blacks in 1953.
