= Colin Kroon =

South African rugby union player

- Full name: Colin Maxwell Kroon
- Born: 22 February 1931 Graaff-Reinet, South Africa
- Died: 13 November 1981 (aged 50)
- Height: 1.83 m (6 ft 0 in)
- Weight: 86.2 kg (190 lb)

Rugby union career
- Position: Hooker
Provincial / State sides
Years	Team	Apps	(Points)
- Eastern Province
International career
Years	Team	Apps	(Points)
1955	South Africa	1	(0)

Colin Maxwell Kroon (22 February 1931 – 13 November 1981) was a South African international rugby union player.

Kroon was born in Graaff-Reinet and educated at Union High School.

A hooker, Kroon represented Eastern Province and was capped once for the Springboks. He got his opportunity as Springboks hooker for the opening Test match against the 1955 British Lions at Ellis Park. The Springboks fielded an inexperienced line up, with over half making their debuts, and lost by a single point. He was succeeded as hooker by Bertus van der Merwe, as one of six changes for the following fixture.

== See also ==
- List of South Africa national rugby union players
