= Des Sinclair =

South African rugby union player

- Born: Desmond John Sinclair; 14 July 1927 Johannesburg, South Africa
- Died: 29 April 1996 (aged 68) Johannesburg, South Africa
- Height: 1.71 m (5 ft 7 1/2 in)
- Weight: 77 kg (12 st 2 lb)
- School: Jeppe High School for Boys
- Occupation(s): salesman chiropractor

Rugby union career
- Position: Centre
Amateur team(s)
Years	Team	Apps	(Points)
- Wanderers RFC
Provincial / State sides
Years	Team	Apps	(Points)
1950–unknown	Transvaal		
International career
Years	Team	Apps	(Points)
1951–1955	South Africa	4	(0)

Desmond John Sinclair (14 July 1927 – 29 April 1996) was a South African rugby union centre. Sinclair played club rugby for Wanderers and provincial rugby for Transvaal. He was capped for South Africa four times in 1955, though he was first selected to play for the Springboks on the 1951–52 South Africa rugby tour of Great Britain, Ireland and France; but was never selected for an international game on that tour. The touring team of 1951/52 is seen as one of the greatest South African teams, winning 30 of the 31 matches, including all five internationals.

== Personal history ==
Sinclair was born in Johannesburg in 1927. He was educated at Jeppe High School for Boys, where the master, Steve Geldenhuys, was a keen rugby player who represented Border. Sinclair was a keen sportsman, as was his father before him, having played soccer for Transvaal. Sinclair was a competitive swimmer, finishing runner up in the Transvaal diving championships. He was an all-round track athlete and a senior hockey player.

Sinclair was also a qualified air pilot and a former holder of a ballroom-dancing championship, a pastime he took up to strengthen an ankle he broke at athletics. He was a salesman by profession at the time of the 1951 tour, but after returning to South Africa he spent some time in America studying to become a chiropractor. As a chiropractor he treated many of South Africa's top sports people, and sometimes travelled in that capacity with the Transvaal rugby team. In 1969 he married Jill Abraham with whom he had two children. He died in Johannesburg in 1996.

== Rugby career ==
Sinclair played rugby as a youth, and was inspired by ex-Springboks Fred Smollan who coached him. On leaving school he played for Wits University before switching to Wanderers. In 1950 he was selected for Transvaal, but in 1951 in the opening game of the season he was injured, requiring a cartilage operation. This nearly kept him out of the 1951 Trial for the Fourth South Africa trial of Britain, but he recovered in time and secured his place in the squad.

=== 1951 tour of Britain ===
Sinclair played in 13 games of the 31 match tour scoring five tries. The tour took in five Test matches against international opposition, but Sinclair was not chosen for any of them, having to wait until 1955 to gain his first full cap. The South Africa management initially selected the four centres on a rotation basis with Sinclair playing three of the first six games. He played in the first game of the tour, against South-Eastern Counties, scoring a try in a comfortable 31–6 victory. He then missed a game before scoring another try in the win over a joint Pontypool/Newbridge team. On 23 October he played for the Springboks against Llanelli, before being rested for two games. He was back in the team for two consecutive matches beginning on 3 November, against North-Eastern Counties and then five days later facing Cambridge University. According to South African journalist R.K. Stent, in the Cambridge game, Sinclair and centre partner Dennis Fry, for the first time in the tour created a centre pairing that 'provided a consistent striking force'. Sinclair scored a try in the match, but picked up an injury that kept him out of the next four games.

When Sinclair recovered he was immediately brought into the squad against the North of Scotland, but was rested for the next three games as the managers switched to the trusted Test pairing of Ryk van Schoor and Tjol Lategan. He was back in the team on 15 December against Swansea and again on 26 December against a Combined Services team. Sinclair was left out for the next three games, but then played three consecutive matches facing a Western Counties, Midland Counties and a South of Scotland team; scoring a try against Midlands. His final matches of the tour were both played in France, against a South-Eastern and South-Western France team.

=== 1955 British Lions tour ===
Sinclair won his first international cap four years after putting on the South Africa jersey, when he was selected for the first game of the 1955 British Lions tour. Sinclair was brought in at his favoured position at centre, partnered with Tom van Vollenhoven, facing the Lions at Johannesburg on 6 August 1955. South Africa lost narrowly, 22–23. Despite the loss, Sinclair was reselected for the second Test, in Cape Town. Van Vollenhoven was moved from centre, out to the wing, and a new centre partnership was formed between Sinclair and Wilf Rosenberg. The Cape Town Test ended in a 25–9 victory for the Springboks with Sinclair being the only member of the threequarter positions not to score a try. The South Africa selectors kept faith in the threequarter positions for the third Test, keeping together the unit that had been successful at Cape Town. The game, played at Pretoria, saw the Lions retake the series with a 6–9 scoreline, requiring the South Africa to win the final test to draw the series. Sinclair played his final international in the fourth Test, a 22–8 victory for the Springboks.

== Bibliography ==
- Billot, John (1974). Springboks in Wales. Ferndale: Ron Jones Publications.
- Griffiths, John (1987). The Phoenix Book of International Rugby Records. London: Phoenix House. ISBN 0-460-07003-7.
- Parker, A.C. (1970). The Springboks, 1891–1970. London: Cassell & Company Ltd. ISBN 0-304-93591-3.
- Stent, R.K. (1952). The Fourth Springboks 1951–1952. London: Longmans, Green and Co.
