= Guadeloupe Rugby Committee =

Comité Territorial de Rugby de Guadeloupe
- Sport: Rugby union
- Website: comiterugbyguadeloupe.com

The Guadeloupe Rugby Committee (French: Comité de Rugby de Guadeloupe, —or officially: Comité Territorial de Rugby de Guadeloupe) is a committee under the umbrella of the French Rugby Federation which is the governing body for rugby union within Guadeloupe.

It is affiliated with the NACRA, which is the regional governing body for North America and the Caribbean, but it is not affiliated with the International Rugby Board (IRB) in its own right.

== National teams ==
As an overseas department of France, Guadeloupe can participate in international competition, but not for the Rugby World Cup. Guadeloupe has thus far competed in the NACRA Caribbean Championship.

== See also ==
- Rugby union in Guadeloupe
- Guadeloupe national rugby union team
