= Gethin Jenkins =

Welsh rugby union player (born 1980)

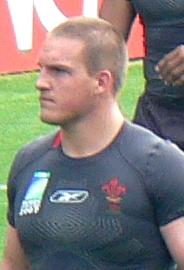
- Jenkins from 2007 Rugby World Cup under Wales team
- Born: Gethin Jenkins; 17 November 1980 (age 45) Llanilltud Faerdref, Wales
- Height: 1.88 m (6 ft 2 in)
- Weight: 121 kg (267 lb; 19 st 1 lb)
- School: Bryn Celynnog Comprehensive School

Rugby union career
- Position: Prop
Amateur team(s)
Years	Team	Apps	(Points)
- Beddau
- Treorchy
Senior career
Years	Team	Apps	(Points)
2000–2003	Pontypridd	62	(5)
2003–2004	Celtic Warriors	13	(5)
2004–2012	Cardiff Blues	126	(25)
2012–2013	Toulon	21	(0)
2013–2018	Cardiff Blues	92	(15)
International career
Years	Team	Apps	(Points)
2002–2016	Wales	129	(20)
2005–2013	British & Irish Lions	5	(0)
Coaching career
- Years: Team
- 2018–2020: Cardiff RFC (defence)
- 2021: Wales U20 (defence)
- 2020–: Wales (defence)
- Correct as of 8 November 2022
- Rugby league career

Playing information
Club
Years	Team	Pld	T	G	FG	P
	Cardiff Demons

Gethin Jenkins (born 17 November 1980) is a Welsh former professional rugby union player who played as a prop for Pontypridd, Celtic Warriors, Cardiff Blues and Toulon. At international level, he won 129 caps for Wales. On his 105th appearance in 2014, he became Wales' most-capped player, overtaking the record held by Stephen Jones; having earned his final cap in November 2016, his record was surpassed by Alun Wyn Jones in September 2019. He is one of a small group of Welsh players to have won three Grand Slams. He also won five caps for the British & Irish Lions on three tours in 2005, 2009 and 2013. He is the sixth most-capped player in rugby union history and the second most-capped front-row forward.

He retired from professional rugby union in November 2018 after struggling with a chronic knee injury. After retirement, he had a number of coaching positions with the Blues and Cardiff RFC. Following some poor performances by Wales in 2020, he joined Wayne Pivac's backroom staff as the national team's defence coach.

== Early career ==
Educated at Llwyncrwn Primary School and Bryn Celynnog Comprehensive School in Beddau, Jenkins first played rugby union aged 13 at Beddau RFC based in Pontypridd.

== Club career ==
Jenkins played his youth rugby at Pontypridd and captained his side to a Welsh Cup title in 1998. He became a regular first-team player and was a key figure in highly successful 2000–2003 Pontypridd team that won the final Principality Cup of the pre-regional era and narrowly losing to Sale Sharks in the final of the Parker Pen Shield competition. The 2002 Pontypridd forwards that Jenkins played alongside were the basis of the pack that led Wales to Grand Slam success in 2005, with ex-Pontypridd players making up six of the eight forwards. Following the introduction of Welsh regional rugby, Jenkins joined the Celtic Warriors. When the Warriors folded after just one season, Jenkins signed for the Cardiff Blues.

At the Cardiff Blues he won the Amlin Challenge Cup, and reached the Heineken Cup semi final. After an impressive World Cup 2011, his signature was hotly sought after with Bath, Perpignan and Toulon all chasing a deal for the prop. Jenkins joined French Top 14 side Toulon for the 2012-13 season.

Jenkins became the ninth Welshman to win a Heineken Cup with Toulon when he played as a replacement in the final against Clermont Auvergne. Jenkins is only the second Welsh player (along with Rob Howley) to win both European cups, after winning the Amlin Challenge Cup in 2010 with the Cardiff Blues and the Heineken Cup with Toulon in 2013.

== International career ==
=== Wales ===
Jenkins made his first appearance for Wales against Romania in 2002. In the 2005 Six Nations Championship he was rated one of the greatest influences in Wales' Grand Slam winning side, scoring a memorable try against Ireland.

In November 2007 Jenkins was asked to captain Wales against South Africa by interim coach Nigel Davies. His reign as captain would last just one game as in December Wales hired Warren Gatland as coach who gave the captaincy to Ryan Jones. However Jenkins kept his place in the squad solidifying himself as number one choice for the #1 jersey.

Jenkins captained Wales against Australia on 28 November 2009 following the withdrawal of regular captain Ryan Jones from the squad due to injury.

Jenkins captained Wales in their last game of the 2013 six nations championship in Cardiff. Wales defeated England 30-3 to win the Championship. On 30 November 2013 versus Australia Jenkins became the most capped forward for Wales, surpassing Pontypridd and Cardiff team-mate Martyn Williams record of 100 caps. On 15 March 2014 versus Scotland he became the most capped player for Wales, overtaking the record of 104 caps held by Stephen Jones.

Jenkins became the world's most capped prop forward ever on 29 August 2015 versus Ireland, overtaking the record of 119 caps held by Jason Leonard.

Jenkins took part in both the 2016 Six Nations and the Wales tour to New Zealand. Jenkins also captained Wales during the 2016 Autumn internationals.

=== British & Irish Lions ===
Jenkins was selected for the British & Irish Lions tour to New Zealand in 2005 and played in all three tests.

On 21 April 2009, Jenkins was named as a member of the British & Irish Lions for the 2009 tour to South Africa.

In June 2009, Jenkins, Adam Jones, and Matthew Rees were selected as the British & Irish Lions front row for the second Test against South Africa. This was the first time an all-Welsh front row was selected for a Lions test match since Billy Williams, Bryn Meredith and Courtney Meredith on the 1955 Lions tour.

Jenkins was selected for the British & Irish Lions for the 2013 tour for the third time, but withdrew due to injury. He narrowly missed out on selection for the 2017 Tour to New Zealand following his knee injury issues.

=== International tries ===
Try	Opponent	Location	Venue	Competition	Date	Result
1	Romania	Cardiff, Wales	Millennium Stadium	2004 Autumn Internationals	12 November 2004	Win
2	Japan	Cardiff, Wales	Millennium Stadium	2004 Autumn Internationals	26 November 2004	Win
3	Ireland	Cardiff, Wales	Millennium Stadium	2005 Six Nations	19 March 2005	Win
4	Namibia	New Plymouth, New Zealand	Yarrow Stadium	2011 Rugby World Cup	26 September 2011	Win

== Coaching career ==
Jenkins began his coaching career as defence coach for Cardiff RFC, while still playing for Cardiff Blues.

In 2020, he assisted with Wales U20, as a defence coach, before joining up with the senior side ahead of the 2020 Autumn Nations Series, as a technical coach.

Ahead of the 2021 Six Nations, his role was made permanent, becoming the full time defence coach.

== Style ==
Jenkins usual position is loosehead prop but he has also played in the tighthead prop position. He was one of the "new-breed" of front-rows, known for his speed, fitness and turnover ability, however some criticism was made of his scrummaging at times during his career.

Despite his stern on-field persona, he was a well-respected and well-liked player, commonly referred to as "Melon".

== Rugby league ==
Jenkins has also played rugby league, making regular appearances for Cardiff Demons in the late 1990s leading them to the 1998 Division Two Academy Grand Final.
