= 1973 Italy rugby union tour of Rhodesia and South Africa =

- Manager: Amos Du Plooy
- Tour captain: Mauro Bollesan
Summary
P	W	D	L
Total
9	1	0	6
Test match
1	0	0	1
Opponent
P	W	D	L
Rhodesia
1	0	0	1

The 1973 Italy rugby union tour of South Africa and Rhodesia was a series of matches played between June and July 1973 in South Africa and Rhodesia by Italy national rugby union team.

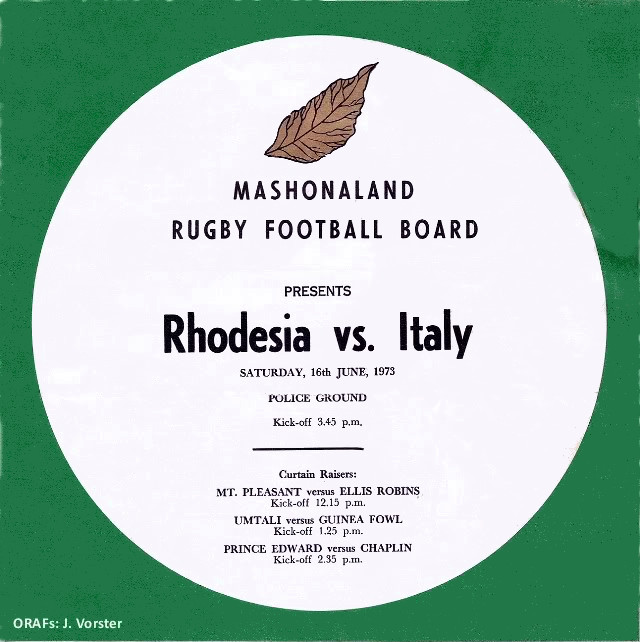
The Rhodesia vs Italy programme

It was the second time that the "Azzurri" toured outside Europe, after a short tour in Madagascar in 1970.

The experience signed a turn in the story of Italian rugby: before of that, contact with the bigger union members was almost non-existent, and limited only to confrontations with France (between 1952 and 1967).

The tour was arranged by Italian federation and SARB, that sent coach Amos du Plooy to Italy to prepare the team. It was an historical tour, but the results were very poor: only a victory against the SARF Leopard selection.

The most important player of the last match, against Transvaal XV, was Rocco Caligiuri: the fly-half (but normally play ad full-back) scored three drops. It was the first time that a player scored three drops in an international match in South Africa. A plate was then put on the wall of Ellis Park Stadium.

== Results ==
Scores and results list Italy's points tally first.

Opposing Team	For	Against	Date	Venue
Rhodesia	4	42	16 June 1973	Salisbury
Western Transvaal	6	32	20 June 1973	Potchefstroom
Border	12	25	23 June 1973	East London
North East Cape	12	31	27 June 1973	Cradock
Natal	3	23	30 June 1973	Kings Park, Durban
Eastern Transvaal	12	39	4 July 1973	Witbank
Leopards	24	4	7 July 1973	Port Elizabeth
Northern Free State	11	12	9 July 1973	Welkom
Transvaal XV	24	28	11 July 1973	Ellis Park, Johannesburg

== Bibliography ==
- (in Italian) Valerio Vecchiarelli, Francesco Volpe, 2000, Italia in meta, GS editore, 2000.
