= Bryn Celynnog Comprehensive School =

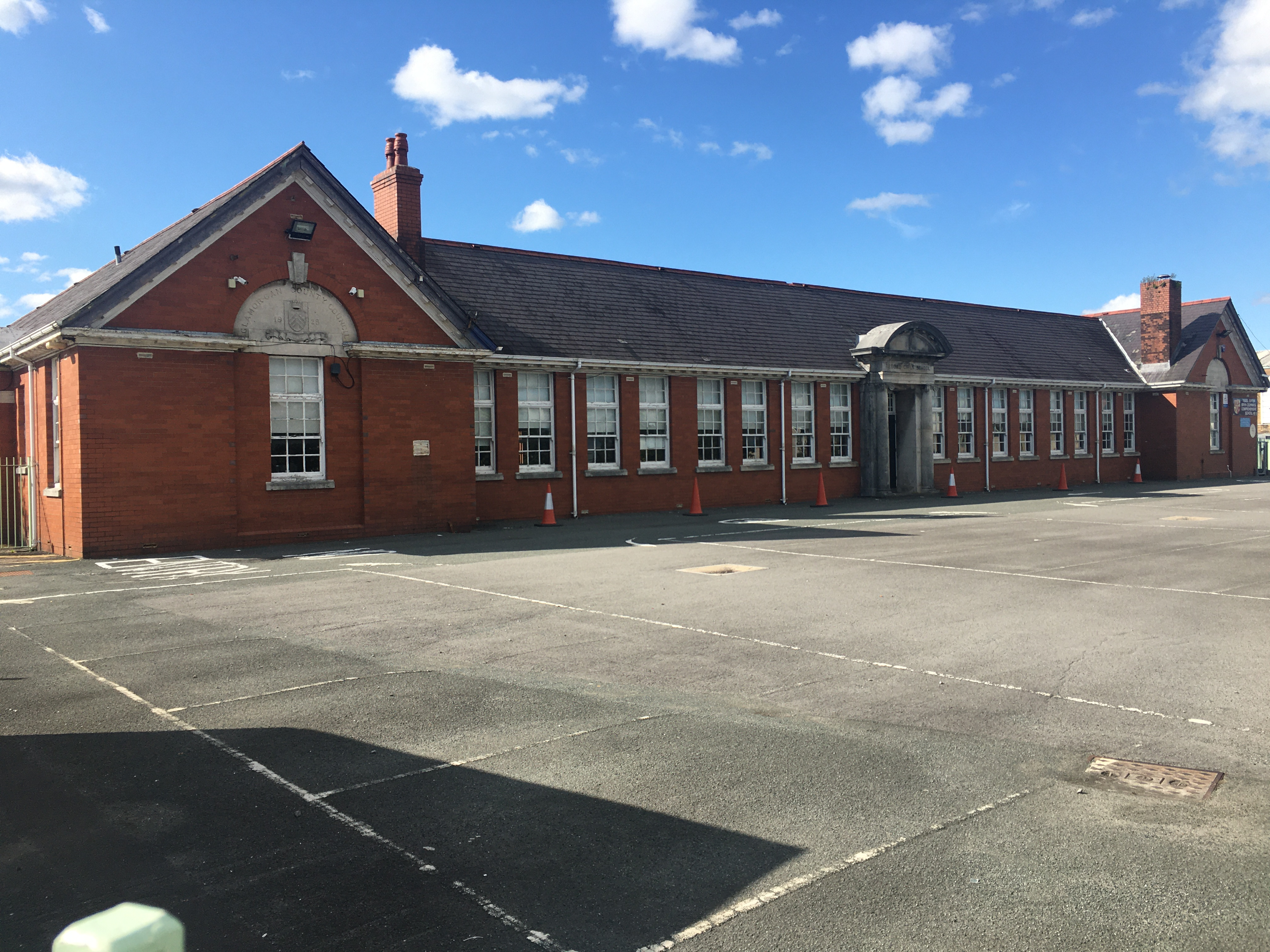

Location
- Penycoedcae Road; Beddau, Rhondda Cynon Taf, CF38 2AE; Wales
- Coordinates: 51.55953°N 3.35963°W

Information
- Type: Community school
- Motto: Nurturing Success
- Local authority: Rhondda Cynon Taf County Borough Council
- Department for Education URN: 401806 Tables
- Head teacher: Debra Baldock
- Teaching staff: 62.3 (on an FTE basis)
- Gender: Mixed
- Age range: 11–18
- Enrolment: 1,126 (2018)
- Student to teacher ratio: 18.1
- Language: English
- Publication: Bryn This Week
- Website: www.bryncelynnog.org.uk

Bryn Celynnog Comprehensive School is an 11–18 mixed, English-medium, community secondary school and sixth form in Beddau, Rhondda Cynon Taf, Wales. As of March 2023, it had 1319 on roll which included 185 in the sixth form.

== History ==
Built as the Beddau Girls School and dated 1928. One of a series of schools with similarities in style by the Glamorgan County Architect, D Pugh Jones. This example is relatively small for a secondary school, perhaps because it was for girls only. Shown on an Ordnance Survey map of 1948 with the same E-shaped plan as today. A dotted line is shown across the rear, perhaps representing a fence which would have bounded a courtyard. It is possible that a rear range was planned but not built.

== Building work ==
Redevelopment of the school's facilities took place in 2023-24, with a new gym, fitness suite and dance studio.

== Notable alumni ==
- Joel James, Welsh politician
- Ellis Jenkins, rugby union player
- Gethin Jenkins, rugby union player
- Neil Jenkins, rugby union player and coach
- Adrian Lewis Morgan, actor
- Kelly Morgan, badminton player
- Michael Owen, rugby union player
- David Roberts, swimmer

== Notable staff ==
- Paul John, former PE teacher
