= Okey Geffin =

South African rugby union player

Aaron "Okey" Geffin
- Born: Aaron Geffin; 28 May 1921 Johannesburg, South Africa
- Died: 16 October 2004 (aged 83) South Africa
- Occupation: Building contractor

Rugby union career
- Position: Forward
Provincial / State sides
Years	Team	Apps	(Points)
- Transvaal
International career
Years	Team	Apps	(Points)
1949, 1951	South Africa	7	(48)

Aaron "Okey" Geffin (28 May 1921 – 16 October 2004) was a South African rugby union player.

He is sometimes considered the greatest Jewish rugby player of all time, and he was inducted into the International Jewish Sports Hall of Fame in 1998.

Geffin's handprints and boot prints are displayed in the New Zealand National Rugby Museum in tribute to his 1949 kicking record.

== Nickname ==
The origin of his nickname "Okey" is unknown. His father was a Russian immigrant, and his first name was left blank on his birth certificate. While a POW, his nickname was "Ox".

== Biography ==
Geffin was born near to Ellis Park rugby stadium in Johannesburg, to a Jewish family of Russian origins.

Geffin fought in World War II and was captured at Tobruk as a POW, and trained while incarcerated. While in Stalag XX-A near Thorn (Toruń) in occupied Poland, he met Bill Payn, a former Springbok, and they helped arrange an "international test" against a New Zealand POW XV.

"We used to scrum for hours on end, and he coached me. Payn arranged rugby games in camp: South Africa against the New Zealanders. Our gear was dyed underpants and vests, but no boots. We played barefoot. Payn encouraged my development and told me I would be a Springbok if I continued to play after the war."

He spent three years in POW camps in Italy and Germany, as well as Poland, where he practised his kicking barefoot near a mass grave of Polish victims of the Nazis.

Geffin was one of the few prop forwards in the game to kick for goal. The Springboks won ten matches in a row, including a 4–0 whitewash of New Zealand on their 1949 tour to South Africa. Prop Okey Geffin helped kick the Springboks to victory—they won all four Tests despite the All Blacks scoring more tries in three of them. When writing about the 1949 series against the All Blacks, Harding and Williams wrote: "(Okey) Geffin won the series, perhaps, but Muller made it possible." He had been taught his kicking by Springbok Freddy Turner before the war.

To the rugby commentator, Bill McLaren, Geffin's play was stunning:

"The defeat which sticks in the memory is that 0–44 thrashing from the South Africans at Murrayfield on 24 November 1951. They were just awesome. It was like sevens played by fifteen men. I had never seen anything quite like them. I had never seen a prop forward run as fast as Chris Koch, had never seen as huge a man as 'Okey' Geffin kick goals...

"At Murrayfield the massive Geffin thumped over seven goals in nine attempts from all over the pitch, with the old fashioned style of having the ball sloping towards the goal and with a dead run up."

Okey Geffin was capped only seven times for South Africa. His first match was on 16 July 1949, against the All Blacks. His last match was on 22 December 1951 against Wales.

He was a building contractor by occupation.

== Statistics ==
Number	Name	Test Debut	Opposition	Caps	Total points	Tries	Cons	Pens	Drops
270	Okey Geffin	16 July 1949	New Zealand	7	48	0	9	10	0

- 7 test matches with South Africa
- Caps by year: 4 in 1949, 3 in 1951

== See also ==
- List of select Jewish rugby union players
