= Rugby union in Guadeloupe =

- Country: Guadeloupe
- Governing body: French Rugby Federation; Comité Territorial de Rugby de Guadeloupe
- National team(s): Guadeloupe

Rugby union in Guadeloupe is a minor, but growing sport.

== Governing body ==
The Comité Territorial de Rugby de Guadeloupe is a committee under the umbrella of the French Rugby Federation which is the governing body for rugby union within Guadeloupe.

The committee is not affiliated to the IRB in its own right, but it is affiliated to NACRA, (formerly NAWIRA), which is the regional governing body for North America and the Caribbean.

== History ==
Boisripeaux Rugby Club des Abymes (BRUC) was established in 1974. They are currently the most successful club.

Good Luck Rugby Club has been going since 1978. It was an amalgamation of le the Stade Pointois, Guadeloupe University Club and l'Etoile de Morne à l'Eau.

== See also ==
- Guadeloupe national rugby union team
- Rugby union in France
