= Dyson Wilson =

England international rugby union player

- Born: Dyson Stayt Wilson; 7 October 1926 Wilderness, Western Cape, South Africa
- Died: 20 April 2011 (aged 84) Cornwall, England
- School: King Edward VI Grammar School, Stafford; Rydal Penrhos, Colwyn Bay
- Occupation(s): Police officer Restaurateur; Farmer

Rugby union career
- Position: Wing forward
Amateur team(s)
Years	Team	Apps	(Points)
- Harlequins RFC
International career
Years	Team	Apps	(Points)
- England
1955	British and Irish Lions	15	(12)

Dyson Stayt "Tug" Wilson (7 October 1926 – 20 April 2011 (aged 84)) was an English international rugby player.

He was born at Wilderness, Western Cape, South Africa and moved to England, following his parents' divorce, at the age of eight. He was accompanied by his mother and siblings and was subsequently adopted by his aunt in Staffordshire. He was educated at the King Edward VI Grammar School in Stafford and Rydal Penrhos School.

He joined the Metropolitan Police Force and was capped for England while playing rugby for them as a wing-forward. He also played for Harlequins and London Counties. After playing eight times for England he was selected for the 1955 British Lions tour to South Africa, making 15 appearances and scoring three tries. He failed to make the test team, however.

He later moved to Rhodesia and opened two curry restaurants in Salisbury. In 1969 he returned to England to settle in Cornwall, a county with strong family connections. He lived in the village of Treen, near Porthcurno, and made a livelihood fishing out of Newlyn during the 1970s. In 1981 he bought a small farm on the Lizard Peninsula where he farmed beef and adopted a 'Euro peasant' philosophy which embraced simple farming methods and anti-consumerism. He was a keen sailor and made several long ocean voyages. His first trip took him to the across the Atlantic and the Pacific on a 29 ft (8.8 m) ketch. On his last voyage he and his wife suffered the loss of their mast in mid-Atlantic and had to make their way to Tristan da Cunha under a jury rig.

He died in 2011 and was buried on his farm. He had married twice; firstly Ann, with whom he had two daughters; secondly Diana, with whom he had two sons and another daughter.
