= Billy Williams (rugby union, born 1929) =

British Lions & Wales international rugby union footballer

- Born: William Owen Gooding Williams; 23 November 1929 Gowerton, Swansea, Wales
- Died: 29 March 2013 (aged 83)
- Occupation(s): Boilermaker; Steelworker

Rugby union career
- Position: Prop
Amateur team(s)
Years	Team	Apps	(Points)
- Gowerton RFC
–	Swansea RFC		
–	Devonport Services R.F.C.		
–	Royal Navy		
–	Barbarian F.C.		
International career
Years	Team	Apps	(Points)
1951–1956	Wales	22	(3)
1955	British Lions	4	(0)

William Owen Gooding Williams (23 November 1929 – 19 March 2013) was a Welsh international rugby union player. A prop forward, he played club rugby for Gowerton, Swansea and the Royal Navy. At international level he represented Wales on 22 occasions and was chosen to represent the British Isles team on their 1955 tour of South Africa.

On the 1955 British Isles tour, the all-Welsh front row of Billy Williams, Bryn Meredith and Courtney Meredith was selected for a Lions test match. This did not occur again until June 2009 when Gethin Jenkins, Adam Jones and Matthew Rees were selected as the British & Irish Lions front row for the 2nd Test against South Africa.
