= Amos du Plooy =

South African rugby union player

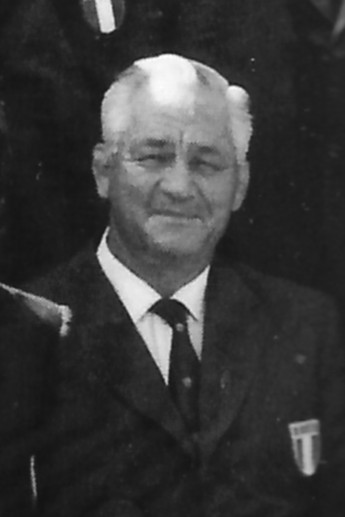
- Du Plooy in 1973
- Born: Abraham Johannes Jacobus du Plooy; 31 May 1921 Douglas, Union of South Africa
- Died: 17 May 1980 (aged 58)
- Height: 1.86 m (6 ft 1 in)
- Weight: 97 kg (214 lb)
- School: Douglas High School
- University: University of Stellenbosch

Rugby union career
Amateur team(s)
Years	Team	Apps	(Points)
- Maties
Provincial / State sides
Years	Team	Apps	(Points)
1942	Western Province		
	Eastern Province	102	
International career
Years	Team	Apps	(Points)
1955	South Africa	1	(0)

Abraham Johannes Jacobus "Amos" du Plooy (31 May 1921 – 17 May 1980) was a South African rugby international.

== Career ==
Du Plooy matriculated at Douglas and began studying at Stellenbosch University in 1939. In 1942 he was selected for Western Province. He then went to play for Eastern Province and played in more than 100 matches for Eastern Province and led the team for 10 years. After the Eastern Province team beat the British Lions 20–0 in 1955, Du Plooy became a Springbok at the age of 35. He only played the one test match for the Springboks.

=== Test history ===
No.	Opponents	Results (SA 1st)	Position	Tries	Dates	Venue
1.	British Lions	25–9	Tighthead prop		6 Aug 1955	Ellis Park, Johannesburg

== See also ==
- List of South Africa national rugby union players – Springbok no. 317
