= Dawie Ackermann =

Former South Africa dual-code rugby international footballer

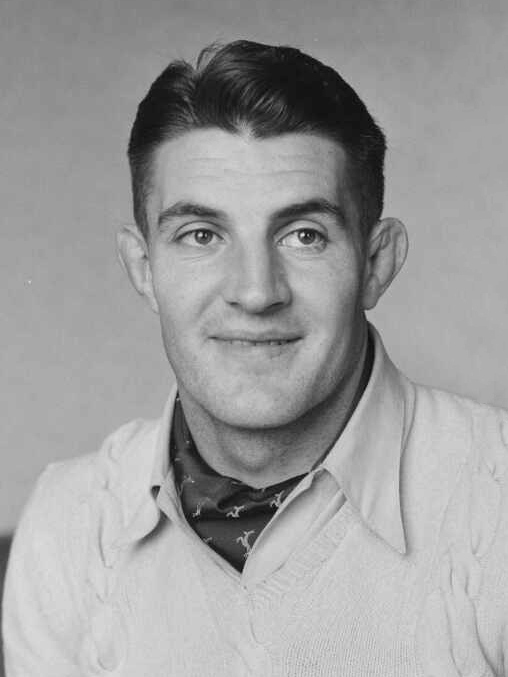
- Ackermann in New Zealand in 1956
- Born: Dawid Schalk Pienaar Ackermann; 3 June 1930 Aliwal North, South Africa
- Died: 1 January 1970 (aged 39)
- Height: 6 ft 2.5 in (189 cm)
- Weight: 15 st 1 lb (211 lb; 96 kg)

Rugby union career
- Position: Flanker
Amateur team(s)
Years	Team	Apps	(Points)
1955–58	Western Province		
1959–61	Transvaal		
International career
Years	Team	Apps	(Points)
1955–58	South Africa	8	(3)
- Rugby league career

Playing information
- Position: Loose forward
Representative
Years	Team	Pld	T	G	FG	P
1963	South Africa	2				0

Dawid Schalk Pienaar "Dawie" Ackermann (3 June 1930 – 1 January 1970), was a South African international rugby union and rugby league footballer. His position was at Flanker (or loose forward in rugby league).

== Rugby union career ==
Ackermann started his career as a rugby union player, appearing for Western Province and Transvaal. He also played in eight test matches for South Africa between 1955 and 1958.

== Rugby league career ==
In 1962, Ackermann was one of a number of high-profile South African players to switch to rugby league. He was selected by the RLSA to play in a three match series against Great Britain, who were returning from their 1962 tour of Australia and New Zealand. Ackermann played in all three games, scoring a try in the second game.

In 1963, he was part of the team which toured Australia and New Zealand, captaining the side in the two games against Australia. Following the collapse of rugby league in South Africa after the tour, Ackermann was forced to retire due to the ban on rugby league players from participating in rugby union.

He died of a heart attack in January 1970, aged 39.
