= Martinique national rugby union team =

Martinique
- Union: Comité Territorial de Rugby de la Martinique

First international
- Barbados 20–19 Martinique (Bridgetown, Barbados; 25 October 1975)

Largest win
- Martinique 55–0 Barbados (Fort-de-France, Martinique; 31 October 1977)

Largest defeat
- Guadeloupe 43–12 Martinique (Bridgetown, Barbados; 23 October 1983)

The Martinique national rugby union team represents Martinique at the sport of rugby. Martinique has been playing international rugby since 1991 but has never qualified for a Rugby World Cup.

They have played mainly against Caribbean sides, i.e. Trinidad & Tobago, Guyana and Barbados.

== Record ==
Below is a table of the representative rugby matches played by a Martinique national XV at test level up until 23 March 2019, updated after match with Curaçao.

Opponent	Played	Won	Lost	Drawn	% Won
Bahamas	1	0	1	0	0%
Barbados	6	4	2	0	66.67%
Bermuda	4	0	3	1	0%
Curaçao	1	1	0	0	100%
Guadeloupe	6	3	3	0	50%
Guyana	5	2	3	0	40%
Jamaica	1	0	1	0	0%
Trinidad and Tobago	9	4	5	0	44.44%
Total	33	14	18	1	42.42%

== See also ==
- French Rugby Federation
- Comité Territorial de Rugby de la Martinique
- Rugby union in Martinique
