= Courtenay Meredith =

British Lions & Wales international rugby union player (1926–2024)

- Born: Courtenay Charles Meredith; 23 September 1926 Pontypridd, Wales
- Died: 30 May 2024 (aged 97)
- School: Neath Grammar School
- University: University College, Cardiff

Rugby union career
- Position: Prop
Amateur team(s)
Years	Team	Apps	(Points)
- Crynant RFC
–	Neath RFC		
International career
Years	Team	Apps	(Points)
1953–1957	Wales	14	(3)
1955	British Lions	4	(0)

Courtenay Meredith (23 September 1926 – 30 May 2024) was a Welsh international rugby union prop who played club rugby for Neath. He won fourteen caps for Wales and also played for invitational club the Barbarians. Meredith was a powerful prop, and was much praised by second row players for his tight packing, which allowed them the opportunity to shove the opposition. He played both tight and loose head prop but preferred tight head.

On the 1955 British and Irish Lions Tour the all-Welsh front row of Billy Williams, Bryn Meredith and Courtenay Meredith was selected for a Lions test match. This did not occur again until June 2009 when Gethin Jenkins, Adam Jones and Matthew Rees were selected as the British and Irish Lions front row for the 2nd Test against South Africa.

Meredith celebrated his 95th birthday in 2021. He was the last survivor from Wales' last triumph over New Zealand, the 13–8 victory at Cardiff Arms Park on 19 December 1953.

Meredith died on 30 May 2024, at the age of 97.

== International matches played ==
Wales

- England 1954, 1955, 1956, 1957
- France 1954, 1955
- Ireland 1954, 1955, 1956
- New Zealand 1953
- Scotland 1953, 1954, 1955, 1957

== Bibliography ==
- Smith, David; Williams, Gareth (1980). Fields of Praise: The Official History of The Welsh Rugby Union. Cardiff: University of Wales Press. ISBN 0-7083-0766-3.
- Thomas, Wayne (1979). A Century of Welsh Rugby Players. Ansells Ltd.
