= Jack Siggins =

Rugby union player from Northern Ireland

- Born: John Allan Edward Siggins; 28 June 1909 Belfast, Ireland
- Died: 24 December 1995 (aged 86) Belfast, Northern Ireland

Rugby union career
- Position: No. 8
Senior career
Years	Team	Apps	(Points)
- Belfast Collegians
International career
Years	Team	Apps	(Points)
1931-1937	Ireland	24	(12)

John Allan Edward Siggins (28 June 1909 – 24 December 1995) was an Irish rugby union Number 8. Siggins played club rugby for Belfast Collegians, having attended Methodist College Belfast and played international rugby for Ireland captaining the national side on nine occasions between 1934 and 1936. In 1955 he was appointed manager of the British Isles team on their tour of South Africa.
