= Jeff Butterfield =

British Lions & England international rugby union player

- Born: Jeffrey Butterfield; 9 August 1929 Heckmondwike, England
- Died: 30 April 2004 (aged 74) Wicken, Northamptonshire, England
- University: Loughborough University

Rugby union career
- Position: Centre
Senior career
Years	Team	Apps	(Points)
- Loughborough Colleges
–	Cleckheaton RUFC		
–	Northampton		
–	Barbarians		
–	Yorkshire	54	
International career
Years	Team	Apps	(Points)
1953–1959	England	28	(Pts:15)
1955	British and Irish Lions	4	(12)

Jeffrey Butterfield (9 August 1929 – 30 April 2004) was an England, British and Irish Lions, Yorkshire, Cleckheaton RUFC, Northampton and Barbarians Rugby player and businessman.

== Education and teaching career ==
Butterfield was educated at Whitcliffe Mount Grammar School, Cleckheaton and Loughborough College, where he took a BSc. in Physical Education in 1951. He later took up a teaching post at Wellingborough Grammar School in Northamptonshire, after which he became a science master at Worksop College.

== Rugby career ==
Butterfield began his senior rugby career with Northampton Saints and played for them 227 times. In addition to his duties at Northampton he also played 54 times for Yorkshire and captained them in two County Championship finals, in 1953 and 1957.

He is considered to have been one of the most gifted centres to have played Rugby for England and was capped 28 times and captained the team four times. He was first capped by England in 1953 against France; here he played with a fellow Northampton player Lew Cannell. Butterfield played for England for 6 years, including 28 successive matches – in his final season he was captain. Butterfield became England's most capped back, and on his watch, England won the Five Nations' Championship four times, the Triple Crown twice and a Grand Slam.

As well as playing for Northampton and England, Butterfield is celebrated for his play on the 1955 British Lions tour to South Africa where he scored tries in three of the four test matches. He later toured with the Lions in New Zealand in 1959 but here he was plagued by an injury and was unable to play in any of the matches.

Butterfield was influenced as a player by the Bradford Northern Rugby League club whom he used to watch as a child. He used to watch the pre-war international outside half, Willie Davies. Of him, Butterfield said, "Willie always carried the ball in front of him with both hands. Though he always continued to run straight when he passed. I modelled my technique on his." One of the most memorable features of Butterfield's game was his near-perfect timing of a pass.

== Later life ==
After retiring from full-time rugby, Butterfield briefly worked the paint industry and later opened the Rugby Club in Hallam Street, London, which he and his wife, Barbara, ran for 25 years. Butterfield and his family also enjoyed skiing. His later years were dogged by ill health.

Butterfield was President of Milton Keynes Rugby Club from 1972 until his death in 2004 and also had a unique role in developing rugby union in the Cayman Islands.

Butterfield married Barbara Kirton in 1956 and they had one son (Giles).
