= Wilf Rosenberg =

South Africa international rugby union and rugby league footballer (1934–2019)

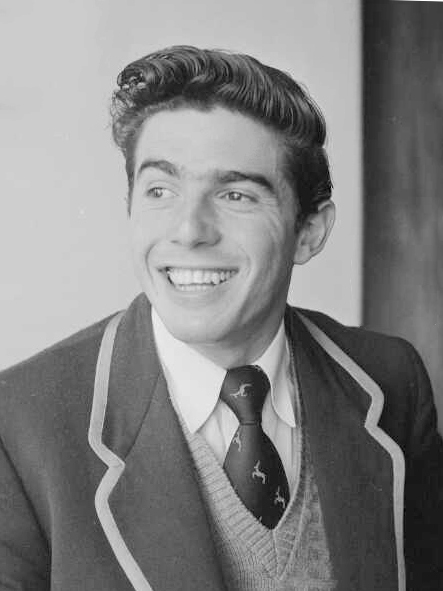
- Rosenberg in New Zealand in 1956

Personal information
- Full name: Wilfred Rosenberg
- Born: 18 June 1934 Sea Point, Cape Town, South Africa
- Died: 14 January 2019 (aged 84) Herzliya, Israel

Playing information

Rugby union
- Position: Centre
Representative
Years	Team	Pld	T	G	FG	P
1955–58	South Africa	5	2	0	0	6

Rugby league
- Position: Centre, Wing
Club
Years	Team	Pld	T	G	FG	P
1959–61	Leeds	81	73	0	0	219
1961–63	Hull FC	86	42	0	0	126
	Total	167	115	0	0	345

Wilf Rosenberg (18 June 1934 – 14 January 2019) was a South African rugby union and rugby league player who played in the 1950s and 1960s.

Rosenberg was inducted into the International Jewish Sports Hall of Fame in 1994.

== Early life ==
Rosenberg was born in Sea Point in Cape Town to Jewish parents. His father, rabbi Philip Rosenberg was the first spiritual leader of the Orthodox Marais Road Shul in Sea Point. He continued to serve mostly Orthodox congregations in South Africa and overseas, but also served Port Elizabeth Temple Israel, a Reform congregation in 1958.

Rosenberg moved to Australia as a child and started playing rugby union while a pupil at Sydney Grammar School. As a teenager, he returned to South Africa and played for his local school, Jeppe High School for Boys in Johannesburg.

== Career ==
Early in his career, Rosenberg began playing for the Transvaal provincial team. Picked five times for the South Africa national rugby union team between 1955 and 1958, in which he scored two tries, Rosenberg moved to the United Kingdom and changed codes to become a professional rugby league player while studying dentistry at Leeds University.

Rosenberg was signed by Leeds for a £6,000 signing-on fee and made his début in 1959. Initially playing as a centre before settling on the wing, in a three-year stay he helped the club win its first Championship title in the 1960–61 season, setting a new club record for most tries in a single season with 48 tries in the 1960–61 season. He rounded off the season playing on the wing in the 25–10 victory over Warrington in the Championship Final at Odsal Stadium, Bradford on Saturday 20 May 1961, in front of a crowd of 52,177. He made 81 appearances for Leeds, scoring 73 tries. Known as "the Flying Dentist", Rosenberg left Leeds in 1961 after breaking his jaw and joined Hull FC for whom he played 86 times, scoring 42 tries before retiring from the game in 1963.

After retiring from rugby, Rosenberg returned to South Africa, where he established his own dental practice before a stroke ended his dental career in 1970. After this, Rosenberg turned his hand to other pursuits, including boxing promotion.

== Personal life ==
Rosenberg was married twice. He first married Elinor, with whom he had three children. Elinor died of cancer in 1989.

He later remarried Shelly Liebowitz, with the marriage ending in divorce. As all three of his children lived overseas, two in Australia and one in Israel, he made aliyah to Israel in 2010. He settled in Beth Protea, a retirement home in Herzliya serving South African olim.

=== Death ===
Rosenberg died in Herzliya from another stroke on 14 January 2019.
