= W. P. C. Davies =

British Lions & England international rugby union player (1928–2018)

William Philip Cathcart Davies (6 August 1928 – 25 January 2018) played rugby union at centre for Evesham RUFC, Cheltenham RUFC, Cambridge University, Harlequins, England and the British Lions (South Africa 1955).

Davies was born at Abberley, Worcestershire. He was educated at Denstone College, Staffordshire, and St Catharine's College, Cambridge. He was a member of the Cambridge University RFC tour to Japan in 1953, the first one by Cambridge after the Second World War. It took place after Oxford had toured in the previous year. He was widely considered to be an excellent centre of great physical power, and achieved a measure of celebrity in his time.

From 1953 to 1959 he taught biology at Christ's Hospital school in Horsham, Sussex. The school gave him special leave for the British Lions tour of South Africa, which overlapped with the start of the school year. He left to become a preparatory school headmaster, first at Smallwood Manor, Uttoxeter, Staffordshire, then at Cheltenham College Junior School, Gloucestershire, and served in that post from 1964 to 1986.

A memorial service was held for him in Cheltenham College Chapel on 22 September 2018. It was attended by Steve Boyle on behalf of the British Lions.
