= Chris Koch (rugby union) =

South African rugby union player

- Full name: Augustus Cristoffel Koch
- Born: 21 September 1927 Moorreesburg, South Africa
- Died: 21 March 1986 (aged 58) Moorreesburg, South Africa
- School: Hoërskool Dirkie Uys

Rugby union career
- Position: Prop
International career
Years	Team	Apps	(Points)
1949–60	South Africa	22	(15)

Augustus Cristoffel Koch (21 September 1927 – 21 March 1986) was a South African rugby union international.

Koch, a farmer from Moorreesburg, played for Boland in the Currie Cup. He was a strong but mobile prop forward and was capped in 22 Test matches for the Springboks from 1949 to 1960, becoming their first player to feature across three decades. He scored five Springboks tries, including a run from the 25-yard line against the British Lions at Ellis Park in 1955, evading three opponents in the process. His brother Willem was a junior Springbok.

== See also ==
- List of South Africa national rugby union players
