= Robin Thompson =

GB & Ireland rugby union & league footballer

Personal information
- Full name: Robin Henderson Thompson
- Born: 5 May 1931 Northern Ireland
- Died: 14 August 2003 (aged 72)

Playing information

Rugby union
Club
Years	Team	Pld	T	G	FG	P
	Ulster	0	0	0	0	0
	London Irish	0	0	0	0	0
	Total	0	0	0	0	0
Representative
Years	Team	Pld	T	G	FG	P
1951–55	Ireland	11	0	0	0	0
	Barbarians	0	0	0	0	0
1955	British & Irish Lions	3	0	0	0	0

Rugby league
- Position: Second-row
Club
Years	Team	Pld	T	G	FG	P
1955–56	Warrington	50	10	0	0	30
- Source: As of 26 Jul 2021

Robin Henderson Thompson (5 May 1931 – 14 August 2003) was a rugby union international for Ireland, a former British Lions captain and rugby league footballer.

Robin Thompson won two Ulster Schools Senior Cup medals with RBAI (Royal Belfast Academical Institution) and played for Ulster Schools. He made the Queen's University RFC senior side in his first year in the university and while still only 18, he made his Ulster début.

He won his first international cap in the second row as a 20-year-old against France in Paris in December 1951. He was also on the team that defeated France in Paris in January 1952. He played throughout the championship and against New Zealand in 1953-54 and the following season captained Ireland against both France and Wales. He was capped 11 times. He won the Ulster Senior League with Queen's University, the Ulster Senior Cup with Instonians, and also played for London Irish, and the Barbarians.

He was made captain of the 1955 British Lions tour to South Africa. He played in three of the four tests on that tour.

Following the tour he turned professional and played rugby league for Warrington. But an injury and subsequent medical advice brought an end to his playing career while still only 25. After returning to Ireland, he subsequently became a media analyst.
