= 1964–65 French Rugby Union Championship =

French rugby championship

French Rugby Championship 1964–65
- Countries: France
- Number of teams: 56
- Champions: Agen (4th title)
- Runners-up: Brive

The 1964–65 French Rugby Union Championship was contested by 56 teams divided into 7 pools.

The four first teams from each pool, along with the best four teams classified fifth in the pools, qualified for the single-elimination portion of the tournament, the "last 32".

Agen won the championship, beating Brive in the final.

== Context ==
The 1965 Five Nations Championship was won by Wales, which lost (13–22) to France.

The Challenge Yves du Manoir was won by Cognac, which beat Perpignan 5–3.

== Qualification round ==
Teams in bold qualified for the next round.

=== Pool 1 ===
- US Bressane
- Castres
- **Graulhet**
- **Lourdes**
- **Pau**
- **Périgueux**
- Saint-Sever
- Toulouse Olympique EC

=== Pool 2 ===
- **Béziers**
- **Biarritz**
- **Chalon**
- **Cognac**
- Dijon
- **La Rochelle**
- Romans
- Saint-Girons

=== Pool 3 ===
- **Aurillac**
- **Brive**
- Lannemezan
- Le Creusot
- Saint-Claude
- Carmaux
- **Stadoceste**
- **Vienne**

=== Pool 4 ===
- **Angoulême**
- **La Voulte**
- Lyon OU
- **Narbonne**
- **Toulouse**
- **Tulle**
- Tyrosse
- Valence

=== Pool 5 ===
- **Agen**
- Albi
- Chambéry
- **Limoges**
- Mazamet
- **Racing**
- AS Saint-Junien
- **Touloun**

=== Pool 6 ===
- Condom (Condom)
- **Dax**
- **Grenoble**
- **Montauban**
- **Perpignan**
- Paris Université Club
- SBUC
- **Mont-de-Marsan**

=== Pool 7 ===
- **Auch**
- **Bayonne**
- **Bègles**
- Cahors
- Foix (Foix)
- **Montferrand**
- Quillan
- **Vichy**

== Last 32 ==
Teams in bold advanced to the next round.

Team 1	Team 2	Results
Agen	Cognac	**8–6**
Limoges	Aurillac	**3–0**
Tulle	Racing	**9–5**
Bègles	Lourdes	**12–3**
La Voulte	Bayonne	**25–6**
La Rochelle	Chalon	**13–12**
Béziers	Vichy	**17–6**
Angoulême	Montferrand	**6–0**
Brive	Narbonne	**9–3**
Toulon	Dax	**11–9**
Graulhet	Perpignan	**11–8**
Montauban	Biarritz	**14–3**
Mont-de-Marsan	Vienne	**16–9**
Auch	Grenoble	**3–12** (see note below)
Stadoceste	Toulose	**14–6**
Périgueux	Pau	**11–6**

Note: Grenoble beat Auch 12–3 but was disqualified, because lined a forme "rugby league" player.

== Last 16 ==
Teams in bold advanced to the next round.

Team 1	Team 2	Results
Agen	Limoges	22–3
Tulle	Bègles	9–8
La Voulte	La Rochelle	6–0
Béziers	Angoulême	3–0
Brive	Toulon	8–3
Graulhet	Montauban	6–3
Mont-de-Marsan	Auch	12–6
Stadoceste	Périgueux	30–6

== Quarterfinals ==
Teams in bold advanced to the next round.

Team 1	Team 2	Results
**Agen**	Tulle	**22–3**
**La Voulte**	Béziers	**12–0**
**Brive**	Graulhet	**5–0**
**Mont-de-Marsan**	Stadoceste	**14–9**

== Semifinals ==
Teams in bold advanced to the final.

Team 1	Team 2	Results
**Agen**	La Voulte	**21–14**
**Brive**	Mont-de-Marsan	**14–6**

La Voulte was eliminated because they had three players out for injuries in the second half.

During the Brive versus Mont de Marsan match, the referee sent off one player of each team. The player from Brive, Normand, was allowed to play in the final match.

== Final ==
Teams	**Agen** – Brive
Score	**15-8**
Date	23 May 1965
Venue	Stade Gerland, Lyon
Referee	Bernard Marie
Line-up
Agen	Marius Lagiewski, Jean-Claude Malbet, Raymond Palladin, Jacques Fort, Michel Lasserre, Michel Sitjar, Serge Viotto, Francesco Zani, Pierre Lacroix, Jean-Claude Hiquet, Jean-Claude Soula, Jean-Pierre Razat, Pierre Gruppi, Bernard Pomiès, Jean-Louis Dehez, Serge Méricq, Georges Cavailles, Claude Salesse
Brive	Pierre Marsaud, Pierre Bessot, Claude Freyssinet, Jean Normand, Roger Fite, Marcel Lewin, Gérard Burguet, Jean-Pierre Delfour, Marcel Puget, Jean-Claude Roques, Serge Castiglioni, Michel Marot, Claude Besson, Pierre Besson, Pierre Villepreux
Scorers
Agen	2 tries by Razat and Sitjar, 2 penalties, and 1 drop by Dehez
Brive	2 tries by Roques and P.Besson, and 1 conversion by Villepreux
