= 1965–66 French Rugby Union Championship =

French Rugby Championship 1965–66
- Countries: France
- Number of teams: 56
- Champions: Agen (5th title)
- Runners-up: Dax

The 1965–66 French Rugby Union Championship was contested by 56 teams divided in 7 pools, The four first teams of each pool and the better for classified fifth were qualified for the "last 32".

The Agen won the Championship 1965–66 after beating Dax in the final and hold the title.

== Context ==
The 1966 Five Nations Championship was won by Wales thanks to his victory (9-8) against France in the last day.

The Challenge Yves du Manoir was won en 1966 by the Lourdes that beat Mont-de-Marsan 16 - 6.

== Qualification round ==
In bold the qualified to next round

=== Pool 1 ===
- **Angoulême**
- **Agen**
- **Lyon OU**
- **Périgueux**
- Quillan
- AS Saint-Junien
- Toulouse
- Vienne

=== Pool 2 ===
- **Auch**
- **Bayonne**
- **Brive**
- Condom (Condom)
- **Lannemezan**
- **USA Limoges**
- Romans
- Vichy

=== Pool 3 ===
- Castres
- Cognac
- **Grenoble**
- **Lourdes**
- Mazamet
- **Montauban**
- **Mont-de-Marsan**
- **Toulouse Olympique EC**

=== Pool 4 ===
- Chambéry
- **Dax**
- **Pau**
- Perpignan
- Saint-Claude
- SBUC
- **La Rochelle**
- **La Voulte**

=== Pool 5 ===
- Cahors
- Graulhet
- Montferrand
- Narbonne
- Paris Université Club
- Saint-Sever
- Touloun
- Tyrosse

=== Pool 6 ===
- **Aurillac**
- **Stade Beaumontois**
- **Bègles**
- **Béziers**
- Dijon
- Le Creusot
- **Racing**
- Valence

=== Pool 7 ===
- **Albi**
- **Biarritz**
- Bourgoin-Jallieu
- Carmaux
- **Chalon**
- Foix
- **Stadoceste**
- **Tulle**

== "Last 32" ==
In bold the clubs qualified for the next round

Team 1	Team 2	Results
Agen	Chalon	11-3
La Rochelle	Montauban	6-3
Narbonne	Pau	9-0
La Voulte	Paris Université Club	25-11
Racing	Lyon OU	9-8
Angoulême	Auch	16-3
Brive	Lourdes	6-0
Béziers	Bayonne	17-15
Dax	Limoges	16-3
Bègles	Périgueux	29-5
Stadoceste	Albi	18-6
Toulouse Olympique EC	Lannemezan	19-3
Mont-de-Marsan	Grenoble	26-16
Tulle	Aurillac	3-3
Graulhet	Stade Beaumontois	6-6
Touloun	Biarritz	14-8

== "Last 16" ==
In bold the clubs qualified for the next round

Team 1	Team 2	Results
Agen	La Rochelle	9-5
Narbonne	La Voulte	12-8
Racing	Angoulême	15-11
Brive	Béziers	12-9
Dax	Bègles	12-5
Stadoceste	Toulouse Olympique EC	10-5
Mont-de-Marsan	Tulle	16-0
Graulhet	Toulon	8-6 (a. p.)

== Quarter of finals ==
In bold the clubs qualified for the next round

Team 1	Team 2	Results
**Agen**	Narbonne	**9-3**
**Racing**	Brive	**12-9**
**Dax**	Stadoceste	**19-3**
Mont-de-Marsan	**Graulhet**	**3-6**

== Semifinals ==
Team 1	Team 2	Results
**Agen**	Racing	**14-8**
**Dax**	Graulhet	**11-5**

== Final ==
**Teams**
**Agen** - Dax
**Score**
**9-8**
**Date**
22 May 1966
**Venue**
Stadium Municipal, Toulouse
**Referee**
Paul Madelmont
**Line-up**

**Agen**
Marius Lagiewski, Jean-Claude Malbet, Raymond Palladin, Jacques Fort, Michel Lasserre, Michel Sitjar, Serge Viotto, Francesco Zani, Pierre Lacroix, Jean-Louis Dehez, Bernard Pomiès, Jean-Pierre Razat, Pierre Gruppi, Jean-Louis Mazas, Jean-Michel Pechambert

Remplaçants : Georges Cavailles, Pierre Biémouret, Claude Salesse, Jean-Claude Soula, Serge Méricq

**Dax**
Jean-Michel Lucq, Léon Bérho, Christian Lasserre, Marcel Cassiède, Jean-Claude Labadie, Pierre Darbos, Gilles Benali, Claude Contis, Georges Capdepuy, Pierre Albaladejo, Jacques Bénède, Jean-Claude Sanz, Claude Dourthe, Michel Arrieumerlou, Jacques Saubesty
**Scorers**

**Agen**
1 try Lasserre, 1 penalty and 1 drop Dehez
**Dax**
1 try Benali, 1 conversion Saubesty, 1 drop Albaladejo

Dax lines up a team with a lot of young people. Dourthe (17), Arrieumerlou (18), Capdepuy (20) and Benali (18).

The final was signed by a lot of brutalities and violence.
