= 1961–62 French Rugby Union Championship =

French Rugby Championship 1961–62
- Countries: France
- Number of teams: 56
- Champions: Agen (3rd title)
- Runners-up: Béziers

The 1961–62 French Rugby Union Championship was contested by 56 teams divided in 7 pools.

The four first teams of each pool and the better fourclassified fifth were qualified for the "last 32".

Le Agen won the Championship 1961-62 after beating the Béziers in the final.

== Context ==
The 1962 Five Nations Championship was won by France.

The Challenge Yves du Manoir was won by Mont-de-Marsan that beat Pau par 14 - 9.

== Qualification round ==
In bold the qualified to "last 32" phase

=== Pool 1 ===
- **Auch**
- **Béziers**
- **SBUC**
- Carmaux
- Limoges
- Lyon OU
- Marmande
- **Perpignan**

=== Pool 2 ===
- **Angoulême**
- **Bayonne**
- Bergerac
- **Cognac**
- **Dax**
- Paris Université Club
- Toulouse Olympique EC
- **Touloun**

=== Pool 3 ===
- Chalon
- **Chambéry**
- Dijon
- **Graulhet**
- **Grenoble**
- **Montauban**
- Montferrand
- Romans

=== Pool 4 ===
- Albi
- **Aurillac**
- Bègles
- **Cahors**
- **Mont-de-Marsan**
- Narbonne
- **Stadoceste**
- Toulouse

=== Pool 5 ===
- **Brive**
- Le Creusot
- **Lourdes**
- Foix
- **Tulle**
- **La Voulte**
- Port-Vendres
- **Racing**

=== Pool 6 ===
- **Vichy**
- Hendaye
- Saint-Girons
- **Pau**
- **Agen**
- Saint-Sever
- **Lannemezan**
- **Vienne**
Multi bandeau|Portail sport|

=== Pool 7 ===
- **La Rochelle**
- **Tyrosse**
- **Mazamet**
- **Biarritz**
- Périgueux
- **Castres**
- AS Saint-Junien
- Saint-Claude

== "Last 32" ==
In bold the clubs qualified for the next round

Team 1	Team 2	Results
Agen	Vienne	14-3
Mazamet	Stadoceste	12-0
Pau	Aurillac	11-5
Racing	Chambéry	5-3
Dax	Perpignan	8-0
Lannemezan	Castres	3-0
La Rochelle	La Voulte	3-3
Toulon	Cognac	6-0
Béziers	Tyrosse	8-0
Brive	Grenoble	9-3
Cahors	Bayonne	13-9
Biarritz	Montauban	5-3
Lourdes	Angoulême	13-3
SBUC	Auch	3-0
Tulle	Mont-de-Marsan	6-6
Graulhet	Vichy	6-3

== "Last 16" ==
In bold the clubs qualified for the next round

Team 1	Team 2	Results
Agen	Mazamet	11-3
Pau	Racing	8-3
Dax	Lannemezan	9-3
La Rochelle	Toulon	3-0
Béziers	Brive	15-9
Cahors	Biarritz	9-0
Lourdes	SBUC	16-3
Tulle	Graulhet	6-0

== Quarter of finals ==
In bold the clubs qualified for the next round

Team 1	Team 2	Results
**Agen**	Pau	**11-3**
**Dax**	La Rochelle	**6-3**
**Béziers**	Cahors	**3-0**
**Lourdes**	Tulle	**12-6**

== Semifinals ==
Team 1	Team 2	Results
**Béziers**	Lourdes	**6-3**
**Agen**	Dax	**8-8** (a.o.t.)

The two finalistes de 1960-61 were qualified for the semifinals, Béziers won the match for number of tries scored.

== Final ==
Teams	**Agen** - Béziers
Score	**14-11**
Date	27 May 1962
Venue	Stadium Municipal, Toulouse
Referee	Raymond Gombeaud
Line-up
Agen	Jean-Pierre Clar, Jean-Claude Malbet, Guy Miquel, Christian Matkowski, Georges Cavailles, Michel Sitjar, Louis Echave, Francesco Zani, Pierre Lacroix, Jean-Claude Hiquet, Serge Méricq, Claude Salesse, Henri Garcia, Michel Arino, Jean-Pierre Razat
Béziers	Jean Arnal, Emile Bolzan, Francis Mas, Claude Vidal, André Gayraud, François Rondi, Roger Gensane, Jean Salas, Pierre Danos, Roger Bousquet, Gilbet Folch, Michel Bernatas, Jacques Fratangelle, Robert Spagnolo, Paul Dedieu
Scorers
Agen	3 tries Méricq (2) and Matkowski (1), 1 conversion and 1 penalty Sitjar
Béziers	1 try Rondi, 1 conversion and 2 penalties Dedieu
