= 2016–17 European Rugby Challenge Cup pool stage =

- Season: 2016–17 European Rugby Challenge Cup
- Date: 13 October 2016 – 22 January 2017

Qualifiers
- Seed 1: (Wales) Ospreys
- Seed 2: (England) Gloucester
- Seed 3: (Scotland) Edinburgh
- Seed 4: (England) Bath
- Seed 5: (France) Brive
- Seed 6: (France) La Rochelle
- Seed 7: (Wales) Cardiff Blues
- Seed 8: (France) Stade Français Paris

The 2016–17 European Rugby Challenge Cup pool stage was the first stage of competition in the third season of the European Rugby Challenge Cup.

It involved 20 teams competing, across 5 pools of 4 teams, for 8 quarter-final places – awarded to the 5 pool winners and the 3 top-ranked pool runners-up.

The pool stage began on 13 October 2016 and was completed on the weekend of 19–22 January 2017.

== Seeding ==
The 20 competing teams were seeded and split into four tiers; seeding was based on performance in their respective domestic leagues. Where promotion and relegation is in effect in a league, the promoted team was seeded last, or (if multiple teams are promoted) by performance in the lower tier.

Rank	Top 14	Premiership	Pro 12	Qualifying Competition
1	(France) Brive	(England) Harlequins	(Wales) Cardiff Blues	(Russia) Enisey-STM
2	(France) La Rochelle	(England) Gloucester	(Wales) Ospreys	(Romania) Timișoara Saracens
3	(France) Grenoble	(England) Bath	(Scotland) Edinburgh	
4	(France) Pau	(England) Worcester Warriors	(Wales) Newport Gwent Dragons	
5	(France) Stade Français	(England) Newcastle Falcons	(Italy) Treviso	
6	(France) Lyon	(England) Bristol		
7	(France) Bayonne			

Teams was taken from a league in order of rank and put into a tier. A draw was used to allocate two second seeds to Tier 1; the remaining team went into Tier 2. This allocation indirectly determined which fourth-seeded team entered Tier 2, while the others entered Tier 3.

Given the nature of the Qualifying Competition, a competition including developing rugby nations and Italian clubs not competing in the Pro12, Rugby Europe 1 and Rugby Europe 2 were automatically included in Tier 4, despite officially being ranked 1/2 from that competition.

The brackets show each team's seeding and their league (for example, 1 Top 14 indicates the team was seeded 1st from the Top 14).

Tier 1	(England) Harlequins (1 AP)	(Wales) Cardiff Blues (1 Pro12)	(France) Brive (1 Top 14)	(Wales) Ospreys (2 Pro12)	(France) La Rochelle (2 Top 14)
Tier 2	(England) Gloucester (2 AP)	(England) Bath (3 AP)	(Scotland) Edinburgh (3 Pro12)	(France) Grenoble (3 Top 14)	(England) Worcester Warriors (4 AP)
Tier 3	(France) Pau (4 Top 14)	(Wales) Newport Gwent Dragons (4 Pro12)	(England) Newcastle Falcons (5 AP)	(Italy) Treviso (5 Pro12)	(France) Stade Français (5 Top 14)
Tier 4	(England) Bristol (6 AP)	(France) Lyon (6 Top 14)	(France) Bayonne (7 Top 14)	(Russia) Enisey-STM (QC 1)	(Romania) Timișoara Saracens (QC 2)

The following restrictions apply to the draw:

- The 5 pools each contain four clubs, one from each of the 4 Tiers.
- Each pool is required to have one club from each league, drawn from Tier 1, 2 or 3. A second team will only be added to a pool during the Tier 4 allocation.

== Pool stage ==
The draw took place on 29 June 2016 in Neuchâtel, Switzerland.

During the pool stage, the teams played the 3 other teams in their pool twice, both at home and away, Based on the result of the match, teams receive:

- 4 points for a win,
- 2 points for a draw,
- 1 attacking bonus point for scoring four or more tries in a match,
- 1 defensive bonus point for losing a match by seven points or less.

Following the pool stage, the five winners from each group progressed to the quarter-finals, along with the three best pool runners-up from the competition. In the event of a tie between two or more teams from the same pool, the following criteria were used as tie-breakers:

1. The club with the greater number of competition points from only matches involving tied teams.
2. If equal, the club with the best aggregate points difference from those matches.
3. If equal, the club that scored the most tries in those matches.

If this did not separate teams, and/or the tie related to teams that did not play each other (i.e., in different pools), the following tie breakers were used:

1. If equal, the club with the best aggregate points difference from the pool stage.
2. The club that scored the most tries in the pool stage.
3. If equal, the club with the fewest players suspended in the pool stage.
4. If equal, the drawing of lots will determine a club's ranking.

Key to colours
Winner of each pool, advance to quarter-finals.
Three highest-scoring second-place teams advance to quarter-finals.
Cannot advance to the quarter-finals.

=== Pool 1 ===
Pos	Team	Pld	W	D	L	PF	PA	PD	TF	TA	TB	LB	Pts
1	(England) Gloucester (2)	6	5	0	1	237	110	+127	31	15	5	0	25
2	(France) La Rochelle (6)	6	5	0	1	203	104	+99	28	11	4	0	24
3	(Italy) Benetton Treviso	6	2	0	4	75	182	−107	9	23	0	0	8
4	(France) Bayonne	6	0	0	6	116	235	−119	14	33	0	1	1

Source: espn.co.uk

15 October 2016
15:00

Benetton Treviso (Italy)	10–41	(France) La Rochelle (1 BP)
Try: McLean 64' c Con: McKinley (1/1) 64'; Pen: McKinley (1/1) 21'	Report	Try: Atonio (2) 17' c, 48' c Forbes 43' c Penalty try 72' c Eaton 75' c Con: James (3/3) 17', 43', 48'; Holmes (2/2) 72', 75'; Pen: James (2/2) 11', 39'

Stadio Comunale di Monigo
Attendance: 1,900
Referee: Greg Garner (RFU)

15 October 2016
17:00

Bayonne (France)	27–47	(England) Gloucester (1 BP)
Try: Lacroix 27' c Labouyrie 37' c Oulai 43' c Con: Méret (3/3) 27', 37', 43'; Pen: Méret (2/2) 3', 14'	Report	Try: Atkinson (2) 5' c, 16' c Scott 9' c Twelvetrees 40' m May 53' c Savage 80' m Con: Hook (4/6) 5', 9', 16', 53'; Pen: Hook (3/3) 30', 51', 77'

Stade Jean-Dauger
Attendance: 5,005
Referee: Gary Conway (IRFU)

20 October 2016
20:45

(1 BP) La Rochelle (France)	51–24	(France) Bayonne
Try: Sazy 3' c Bouldoire (2) 6' c, 34' c Eaton 23' c Barry 38' m Retiere 53' m Botia 56' m Cedaro 72' m Con: James (4/8) 3', 6', 23', 34'; Pen: James (1/1) 19'	Report	Try: Laveau 21' c Huete 43' c Penalty try 75' c Con: Méret (2/2) 21', 43'; Rouet (1/1) 75'; Pen: Méret (1/1) 32'

Stade Marcel-Deflandre
Attendance: 14,634
Referee: Matthew Carley (RFU)

22 October 2016
15:00

(1 BP) Gloucester (England)	37–8	(Italy) Benetton Treviso
Try: Ludlow 24' c May 40' c Scott 52' c Braley 80' c Con: Laidlaw (3/3) 24', 40', 52'; Hook (1/1) 80'; Pen: Laidlaw (3/3) 11', 19', 50'	Report	Try: M. Tagicakibau 41' m Pen: McKinley (1/1) 28'

Kingsholm Stadium
Attendance: 9,618
Referee: Dudley Phillips (IRFU)

8 December 2016
19:45

(1 BP) Gloucester (England)	35–14	(France) La Rochelle
Try: Atkinson 20' c Hohneck 29' m Thorley 35' c Scott 78' c Con: Laidlaw (3/4) 21', 37', 79'; Pen: Laidlaw (3/3) 25', 55', 65'	Report	Try: Gourdon 9' c Raikuna 44' c Con: Holmes (2/2) 10', 46'

Kingsholm Stadium
Attendance: 9,278
Referee: Andrew Brace (IRFU)

9 December 2016
20:00

Bayonne (France)	15–28	(Italy) Benetton Treviso
Try: Oulai 54' c Thiéry 75'm Con: Méret (1/1) 54'; Pen: Méret (1/1) 11'	Report	Try: Odiete 26' c Bigi 43' m Sgarbi 49' c Con: Allan (2/3) 28', 50'; Pen: Allan (3/4) 4', 17', 36'

Stade Jean-Dauger
Attendance: 2,200
Referee: Tom Foley (RFU)

17 December 2016
15:00

Benetton Treviso (Italy)	21–17	(France) Bayonne (1 BP)
Try: Odiete 17' c Bigi 25' c Penalty try 36' c Con: Allan (3/3) 18', 26', 37'	Report	Try: Tisseron 14' c Lacroix 54' c Con: Lagarde (2/2) 15', 54'; Pen: Lagarde (1/2) 10'

Stadio Comunale di Monigo
Attendance: 1,500
Referee: Craig Maxwell-Keys (RFU)

17 December 2016
20:45

(1 BP) La Rochelle (France)	42–13	(England) Gloucester
Try: Lacroix (2) 19' m, 56' m Murimurivalu 31' c Forbes 38' m Botia 59' c Penalty try 70' c Con: James (2/5) 32', 60'; Holmes (1/1) 70'; Pen: James (2/2) 6', 11'	Report	Try: Afoa 50' c Con: Burns (1/1) 51'; Pen: Burns (2/2) 2', 29'

Stade Marcel-Deflandre
Attendance: 14,153
Referee: Ian Davies (WRU)

12 January 2017
20:45

Bayonne (France)	14–24	(France) La Rochelle
Try: Fuster 79' m Pen: Lagarde (3/3) 3', 26', 34'	Report	Try: Cedaro 32' c Boughanmi 40' c Botia 42' c Con: James (3/3) 33', 40', 43'; Pen: James (1/1) 9'

Stade Jean-Dauger
Attendance: 1,498
Referee: Dudley Phillips (IRFU)

14 January 2017
17:00

Benetton Treviso (Italy)	0–41	(England) Gloucester (1 BP)
	Report	Try: Hook 18' c Hibbard (2) 37' c, 62' m Scott 58' c Halaifonua 75' m Twelvetrees 80' c Con: Laidlaw (2/2) 19', 38'; Burns (2/4) 59', 80'; Pen: Laidlaw (1/1) 7'

La Ghirada Sports Center
Attendance: 700
Referee: Thomas Charabas (FFR)

Due to a frozen pitch at the main ground at the Stadio Comunale di Monigo complex, kick off was delayed by 2 hours and moved to a nearby training ground.

21 January 2017
20:00

(1 BP) Gloucester (England)	64–19	(France) Bayonne
Try: Ludlow 3' c Heinz (3) 14' c, 24' c, 46' m May 32' c Dawidiuk 38' m Symons 44' c Purdy 53' c Hohneck 58' c Braley 60' m Con: Burns (6/8) 4', 15', 25', 33', 45', 53'; Twelvetrees (1/2) 59'	Report	Try: Laveau (3) 17' m, 26' c, 49' c Con: Méret (2/3) 27', 50'

Kingsholm Stadium
Attendance: 9,265
Referee: Lloyd Linton (SRU)

21 January 2017
21:00

(1 BP) La Rochelle (France)	31–8	(Italy) Benetton Treviso
Try: Forbes 43' c Amosa 65' c Retiere (2) 68' c, 74' c Con: Holmes (4/4) 44', 66', 69', 75'; Pen: Holmes (1/3) 57'	Report	Try: Gori 29' m Con: McKinley (0/1); Pen: McKinley (1/1) 19'

Stade Marcel-Deflandre
Attendance: 13,123
Referee: Ian Tempest (RFU)

=== Pool 2 ===
Pos	Team	Pld	W	D	L	PF	PA	PD	TF	TA	TB	LB	Pts
1	(Wales) Ospreys (1)	6	6	0	0	279	51	+228	42	7	6	0	30
2	(France) Lyon	6	3	0	3	187	164	+23	26	21	4	0	16
3	(England) Newcastle Falcons	6	2	0	4	158	180	−22	22	26	2	2	12
4	(France) Grenoble	6	1	0	5	74	303	−229	8	44	1	0	5

Source: espn.co.uk

14 October 2016
19:30

Grenoble (France)	13–39	(France) Lyon (1 BP)
Try: Jammes 6' c Con: Bosch (1/1) 6'; Pen: Bosch (2/2) 19', 29'	Report	Try: Mapusua 15' c Regard 66' m Fourie 76' m Clunies-Ross 80' c Con: Potgieter (2/4) 15', 80'; Pen: Potgieter (5/5) 21', 27', 34', 42', 47'

Stade des Alpes
Attendance: 7,003
Referee: Dudley Phillips (IRFU)

14 October 2016
19:05

(1 BP) Ospreys (Wales)	45–0	(England) Newcastle Falcons
Try: Biggar 20' c Webb 25' c Beck 34' m Baldwin 54' c Tipuric 55' c Giles (2) 61' c, 71' m Con: Biggar (5/7) 20', 25', 54', 55', 61'	Report

Liberty Stadium
Attendance: 7,352
Referee: David Wilkinson (IRFU)

22 October 2016
20:45

Lyon (France)	13–31	(Wales) Ospreys (1 BP)
Try: Browning 59' m Romanet 80' m Pen: Potgieter (1/1) 25'	Report	Try: Giles (3) 15' c, 30' c, 45' c Parry 79' c Con: S. Davies (4/4) 15', 30', 45', 79'; Pen: S. Davies (1/1) 8'

Matmut Stadium
Attendance: 6,500
Referee: Andrew Brace (IRFU)

23 October 2016
15:00

(1 BP) Newcastle Falcons (England)	50–7	(France) Grenoble
Try: Welch 4' c Witty 25' c Takulua 32' c M. Wilson 40' c Sowrey 44' c Hodgson 52' m Lawson 64' m Watson 77' m Con: Hodgson (5/8) 4', 25', 32', 40', 44'	Report	Try: Sawailau 73' c Con: Mele (1/1) 73'

Kingston Park
Attendance: 3,390
Referee: Lloyd Linton (SRU)

9 December 2016
18:00

Grenoble (France)	7–59	(Wales) Ospreys (1 BP)
Try: Gelin 24' c Con: Bosch (1/1) 25'	Report	Try: Fonotia 4' c Parry 11' c A.W. Jones 26' c Matavesi 38' c Howells (2) 49' m, 57' c Giles (2) 63' c, 75' c Biggar 78' m Con: Biggar (7/9) 5', 13', 28', 40', 57', 65', 76'

Stade Lesdiguières
Attendance: 6,754
Referee: Marius Mitrea (FIR)

Due to a frozen pitch on the 8 December, the game was postponed to the following day.

8 December 2016
18:30

(1 BP) Lyon (France)	42–12	(England) Newcastle Falcons
Try: Mavinga 12' c Bonnefond (3) 27' c, 68' c, 79' c Lambey 34' c Figuerola 73' c Con: Porical (6/6) 13', 28', 35', 70', 75', 80'	Report	Try: Temm 4' m Vickers 44' c Con: Connon (1/2) 45'

Matmut Stadium
Attendance: 8,892
Referee: David Wilkinson (IRFU)

17 December 2016
15:00

(1 BP) Ospreys (Wales)	71–3	(France) Grenoble
Try: Cracknell 18' c Beck 29' c Baldwin (2) 33' c, 37' m Evans (2) 40' c, 74' c Leonard 41' c Biggar 55' c Dirksen (2) 65' m, 77' m Otten 71' c Con: Biggar (8/11) 18', 29', 33', 40', 41', 55', 71', 74'	Report	Pen: Bosch (1/1) 3'

Liberty Stadium
Attendance: 7,039
Referee: Luke Pearce (RFU)

18 December 2016
15:00

(1 BP) Newcastle Falcons (England)	48–29	(France) Lyon (1 BP)
Try: Socino (2) 11' c, 16' c Takulua 13' c Hodgson 38' c Kibirige 52' c Chick 71' c Con: Hodgson (5/5) 12', 14', 17', 39', 53'; Willis (1/1) 71' c Pen: Hodgson (2/2) 9', 28'	Report	Try: Regard 24' c Barassi 41' c Romanet 66' m Bonnefond 79' c Con: Porical (3/4) 25', 42', 79'; Pen: Porical (1/1) 6'

Kingston Park
Attendance: 3,507
Referee: Gary Conway (IRFU)

13 January 2017
19:00

(1 BP) Grenoble (France)	31–27	(England) Newcastle Falcons (1 BP)
Try: Mele 31' c Penalty try 60' c Fourcade 63' c Estebanez 76' c Con: Bosch (4/4) 32', 61', 65', 78'; Pen: Bosch (1/1) 42'	Report	Try: C. Harris 9' c Green 47' c S. Wilson 68' c Con: Willis (3/3) 10', 48', 69'; Pen: Willis (2/2) 33', 56'

Stade des Alpes
Attendance: 6,850
Referee: Vlad Iordachescu (FRR)

15 January 2017
15:00

(1BP) Ospreys (Wales)	47–7	(France) Lyon
Try: Baker 30' c Fonotia 36' m Dirksen 41' c King 46' c Evans 52' c Tipuric 55' c Beard 72' c Con: Biggar (6/7) 31', 43', 47', 53', 56', 72'	Report	Try: Browning 15' c Con: Harris (1/1) 15'

Liberty Stadium
Attendance: 6,986
Referee: Craig Maxwell-Keys (RFU)

21 January 2017
18:00

(1 BP) Lyon (France)	57–13	(France) Grenoble
Try: Paea 1' c Buckle 4' c Regard 17' c Nalaga 21' m Porical (2) 44' c, 55' m Bonnefond 60' m Penalty try 66' c Browning 72' c Con: Loursac (3/4) 2', 4', 18'; Porical (3/5) 45', 67', 73'	Report	Try: Kimlin 32' c Con: Gelin (1/1) 33'; Pen: Gelin (2/2) 13', 39'

Matmut Stadium de Gerland
Attendance: 12,080
Referee: Sean Gallagher (IRFU)

21 January 2017
17:00

(1 BP) Newcastle Falcons (England)	21–26	(Wales) Ospreys (1 BP)
Try: Temm 11' c Vickers 26' c Harris 32' c Con: Willis (3/3) 12', 27', 33'	Report	Try: Webb 4' c Dirksen 55' m S. Davies 67' c Otten 70' c Con: S. Davies (3/4) 4', 68', 71'

Kingston Park
Attendance: 3,551
Referee: Alexandre Ruiz (FFR)

Following this win, Ospreys were the first-ever team in the history of either European rugby competition to get 30 match points out of 30 at the pool stage.

=== Pool 3 ===
Pos	Team	Pld	W	D	L	PF	PA	PD	TF	TA	TB	LB	Pts
1	(France) Brive (5)	6	5	0	1	175	120	+55	16	13	3	0	23
2	(Wales) Newport Gwent Dragons	6	3	0	3	150	140	+10	19	19	2	0	14
3	(England) Worcester Warriors	6	2	0	4	147	117	+30	22	13	2	3	13
4	(Russia) Enisey-STM	6	2	0	4	107	202	−95	13	27	1	0	9

Source: espn.co.uk

14 October 2016
19:30

(1 BP) Newport Gwent Dragons (Wales)	37–16	(France) Brive
Try: Landman 11' c Evans 64' m Hill 68' c Amos 73' m Warren 75' c Con: Macleod (1/1) 11'; A. O'Brien (2/4) 68', 75'; Pen: Macleod (2/2) 3', 8'	Report	Try: Laranjeira 17' c Con: Laranjeira (1/1) 17'; Pen: Laranjeira (3/3) 29', 36', 60'

Rodney Parade
Attendance: 4,126
Referee: Craig Maxwell-Keys (RFU)

15 October 2016
15:00

Enisey-STM (Russia)	19–12	(England) Worcester Warriors (1 BP)
Try: Kacharava 6' c Con: Kushnarev (1/1) 6'; Pen: Kushnarev (3/3) 2', 50', 64'; Drop: Gaisin (1/1) 75'	Report	Try: Adams 10' c Alo 70' m Con: Shillcock (1/2) 10'

Slava Stadium, Moscow
Attendance: 1,000
Referee: Marius Mitrea (FIR)

22 October 2016
15:00

(1 BP) Worcester Warriors (England)	24–25	(France) Brive
Try: Bower 28' c Penalty try 58' c Short 80' c Con: Heathcote (1/1) 28'; Shillcock (2/2) 58', 80'; Pen: Heathcote (1/1) 47'	Report	Try: Ngwenya 4' c Hireche 60' m Acquier 73' c Con: Laranjeira (1/1) 4'; N. Bézy (1/1) 73'; Pen: Laranjeira (2/2) 9', 64'

Sixways Stadium
Attendance: 7,209
Referee: Gary Conway (IRFU)

22 October 2016
15:00

(1 BP) Enisey-STM (Russia)	38–18	(Wales) Newport Gwent Dragons
Try: Gerasimov (2) 28' c, 74' c Selskiy (2) 35' c, 63' c Morozov 80' c Con: Kushnarev (5/5) 28', 35', 63', 74', 80'; Pen: Kushnarev (1/1) 17'	Report	Try: Howard 20' c Beard 31' m Con: A. O'Brien (1/2) 20'; Pen: A. O'Brien (2/2) 55', 62'

Trud Stadium, Krasnodar
Attendance: 1,500
Referee: Vlad Iordachescu (FRR)

10 December 2016
15:00

Enisey-STM (Russia)	8–43	(France) Brive (1 BP)
Try: Rudoy 16' m Pen: Kushnarev (1/2) 30'	Report	Try: Bezy 1' c Namy 32' c Ribes 44' c Masilevu 80' c Con: Germain (3/3) 2', 33', 46'; Bezy (1/1) 80'; Pen: Germain (5/5) 10', 22', 27', 37', 41'

Sochi Central Stadium, Sochi
Attendance: 300
Referee: Ian Tempest (RFU)

10 December 2016
15:00

(1 BP) Worcester Warriors (England)	33–20	(Wales) Newport Gwent Dragons
Try: Rapava-Ruskin 40' c Hammond 42' m Penalty try (2) 47' c, 58' c Stelling 72' c Con: Braid (4/5) 40', 48', 59', 73'	Report	Try: Hewitt (2) 75' c, 77' c Con: O'Brien (2/2) 76', 78'; Pen: O'Brien (1/1) 12'; Drop: O'Brien (1/1) 7'

Sixways Stadium
Attendance: 7,168
Referee: Thomas Charabas (FFR)

16 December 2016
19:00

(1 BP) Brive (France)	38–18	(Russia) Enisey-STM
Try: Masilevu 14' c Snyman 20' c Koyamaibole 30' c Ngwenya (2) 52' m, 61' c Le Devedec 77' m Con: Laranjeira (4/5) 15', 21', 31', 62'; Pen: Laranjeira (0/1)	Report	Try: Magomedov (2) 54' m, 80' c Con: Kushnarev (1/2) 80'; Pen: Kushnarev (2/3) 1', 40'

Stade Amédée-Domenech
Attendance: 4,000
Referee: Tom Foley (RFU)

16 December 2016
19:30

Newport Gwent Dragons (Wales)	22–7	(England) Worcester Warriors
Try: Knoyle 7' c Morgan 50' m Hobbs 57' c Con: O'Brien (2/3) 7', 57'; Pen: O'Brien (1/2) 24'	Report	Try: Braid 2' c Con: Braid (1/1) 2'

Rodney Parade
Attendance: 4,096
Referee: David Wilkinson (IRFU)

13 January 2017
19:30

(1 BP) Newport Gwent Dragons (Wales)	34–10	(Russia) Enisey-STM
Try: T. Thomas 19' c Buckley 62' c Keddie (2) 72' c, 74' c Con: D. Jones (1/1) 20'; O'Brien (3/3) 63', 72', 75'; Pen: D. Jones (2/2) 4', 31'	Report	Try: Simplikevich 53' m Kurashov 80' m

Rodney Parade
Attendance: 3,544
Referee: Frank Murphy (IRFU)

14 January 2017
21:00

Brive (France)	17–14	(England) Worcester Warriors (1 BP)
Try: Luafutu 41' c Ribes 62' c Con: Lapeyre (1/1) 41'; Germain (1/1) 63'; Pen: Germain (1/1) 80'	Report	Try: Mama 20' c Rapava-Ruskin 54' c Con: Braid (1/1) 21'; Mills (1/1) 55'; Pen: Braid (0/1)

Stade Amédée-Domenech
Attendance: 2,500
Referee: Ian Davies (WRU)

21 January 2017
15:00

(1 BP) Brive (France)	36–19	(Wales) Newport Gwent Dragons
Try: Bekoshvili (2) 4' m, 64' c Ngwenya 13' c Lavergne 33' c Toetu 69' c Con: Germain (4/5) 15', 34', 65', 70'; Pen: Germain (1/1) 12'	Report	Try: Knoyle 19' c Pretorius (2) 38' c, 47' m Con: O'Brien (2/3) 19', 39'

Stade Amédée-Domenech
Attendance: 5,000
Referee: Craig Maxwell-Keys (RFU)

21 January 2017
14:00

(1 BP) Worcester Warriors (England)	57–14	(Russia) Enisey-STM
Try: Rapava-Ruskin 6' m Hammond (3) 14' m, 29' m, 37' c Betty 33' c Howard 45' m Penalty try 68' c Ripper-Smith 78' m Stelling 80' m Con: Braid (2/6) 34', 38'; Eden (1/3) 69'; Pen: Braid (2/3) 3', 26'	Report	Try: Gachechiladze 40' c Morozov 53' c Con: Kushnarev (2/2) 40', 54'

Sixways Stadium
Attendance: 6,097
Referee: Dan Jones (WRU)

=== Pool 4 ===
Pos	Team	Pld	W	D	L	PF	PA	PD	TF	TA	TB	LB	Pts
1	(England) Bath (4)	6	5	0	1	214	91	+123	24	10	3	0	23
2	(Wales) Cardiff Blues (7)	6	5	0	1	150	115	+35	16	15	2	0	22
3	(England) Bristol	6	2	0	4	138	181	−43	19	22	2	0	10
4	(France) Pau	6	0	0	6	97	212	−115	13	25	0	2	2

Source: espn.co.uk

14 October 2016
19:45

Bristol (England)	20–33	(Wales) Cardiff Blues (1 BP)
Try: Crumpton 15' c Joyce 80' c Con: Jarvis (1/1) 15'; Searle (1/1) 80'; Pen: Jarvis (2/2) 6', 27'	Report	Try: Lee-Lo 30' c Turnbull 37' m Cuthbert 48' c James 73' m Con: Anscombe (2/2) 30', 48'; Pen: Anscombe (3/3) 10', 19', 22'

Ashton Gate Stadium
Attendance: 8,289
Referee: Pascal Gaüzère (FFR)

15 October 2016
20:45

(1 BP) Pau (France)	22–25	(England) Bath
Try: Buros 8' c Dougall 39' c Votu 73' m Con: Fajardo (2/3) 9', 40'; Pen: Fajardo (1/2) 59'	Report	Try: Rokoduguni 21' c Con: Priestland (1/1) 22'; Pen: Priestland (6/6) 1', 13', 36', 56', 63', 70'

Stade du Hameau
Attendance: 9,212
Referee: Ian Davies (WRU)

20 October 2016
19:45

Bath (England)	22–6	(England) Bristol
Try: Banahan 80' c Con: Priestland (1/1) 80'; Pen: Priestland (5/5) 7', 17', 35', 41', 65'	Report	Pen: Searle (1/1) 27'; Geraghty (1/1) 75'

Recreation Ground
Attendance: 13,257
Referee: David Wilkinson (IRFU)

21 October 2016
19:15

Cardiff Blues (Wales)	27–12	(France) Pau
Try: Scully 2' c Allen (2) 49' c, 60' c Con: S. Shingler (3/3) 2', 49', 60'; Pen: S. Shingler (2/2) 10', 24'	Report	Try: Ramsay 16' m Dupouy 79' c Con: Lacrampe (1/2) 79'

Cardiff Arms Park
Attendance: 6,960
Referee: JP Doyle (RFU)

10 December 2016
14:30

Cardiff Blues (Wales)	28–3	(England) Bath
Try: Morgan 49' m Cuthbert 54' c Andrews 78' c Con: Shingler (2/3) 55', 78'; Pen: Shingler (3/4) 2', 9', 25'	Report	Pen: Homer (1/1) 12'

Cardiff Arms Park
Attendance: 7,569
Referee: George Clancy (IRFU)

11 December 2016
15:00

(1 BP) Bristol (England)	41–14	(France) Pau
Try: Wallace 2' m Varndell 17' m Searle 25' m Arscott 32' c Palamo 41' c Brooker (2) 71' c, 76' m Con: Searle (2/5) 33', 42'; Jarvis (1/2) 72'	Report	Try: Votu 20' c Daubagna 78' c Con: Fajardo (2/2) 21', 79'

Ashton Gate Stadium
Attendance: 7,559
Referee: Dudley Phillips (IRFU)

15 December 2016
19:45

(1 BP) Bath (England)	38–3	(Wales) Cardiff Blues
Try: Batty (2) 26' c, 64' c Wilson 43' c Brew 51' c Stooke 78' c Con: Ford (4/4) 27', 44', 52', 65'; Homer (1/1) 79'; Pen: Ford (1/2) 32'	Report	Pen: Shingler (1/2) 21'

Recreation Ground
Attendance: 12,556
Referee: Alexandre Ruiz (FFR)

16 December 2016
20:00

Pau (France)	18–28	(England) Bristol (1 BP)
Try: Daubagna 12' c Vatubua 15' m Con: Daubagna (1/2) 13'; Pen: Daubagna (2/2) 5', 24'	Report	Try: Wallace 9' c Varndell (3) 39' c, 61' c, 70' c Con: Woodward (1/1) 11'; Searle (1/1) 40'; Jarvis (2/2) 63', 71'

Stade du Hameau
Attendance: 8,373
Referee: Lloyd Linton (SRU)

13 January 2017
19:45

Bristol (England)	22–57	(England) Bath (1 BP)
Try: Varndell 33' c R. Williams 55' c Tovey 80' m Con: Searle (2/2) 34', 56'; Pen: Searle (1/1) 3'	Report	Try: Dunn 5' c Homer 16' c Fruean 24' c Fotuali'i (2) 31' c, 47' c Ford 39' c Rokoduguni 58' m Cook 77' c Con: Ford (6/6) 7', 17', 25', 32', 40', 49'; Homer (1/2) 78'; Pen: Ford (1/1) 22'

Ashton Gate Stadium
Attendance: 13,140
Referee: Marius Mitrea (FIR)

14 January 2017
18:30

(1 BP) Pau (France)	21–22	(Wales) Cardiff Blues
Try: Dupichot 4' c Tomas 19' c Dupouy 67' c Con: Fajardo (3/3) 5', 20', 67'	Report	Try: Halaholo 49' c Con: Shingler (1/1) 50'; Pen: Shingler (5/5) 2', 12', 43', 60', 78'

Stade du Hameau
Attendance: 6,050
Referee: Gary Conway (IRFU)

21 January 2017
15:00

Bath (England)	69–10	(France) Pau
Try: Dunn 1' c Grant (2) 6' c, 42' m Watson (2) 22' m, 51' c Homer 28' c Priestland 57' c Mercer 71' c Tapuai 75' c Batty 79' c Con: Ford (3/5) 2', 7', 28'; Homer (4/4) 52', 57', 71', 77'; Tapuai (1/1) 80'; Pen: Ford (1/1) 20'	Report	Try: Ratuvou 61' c Con: Fajardo (1/1) 62'; Pen: Fajardo (1/1) 40'

Recreation Ground
Attendance: 12,080
Referee: Ben Whitehouse (WRU)

21 January 2017
15:00

(1 BP) Cardiff Blues (Wales)	37–21	(England) Bristol
Try: Dacey 20' m Anscombe 23' c Morgan (2) 43' m, 69' c Warburton 74' c Con: Shingler (3/5) 24', 70', 75'; Pen: Shingler (2/2) 30', 58'	Report	Try: J. Williams (2) 31' c, 55' c Tovey 39' c Con: Jarvis (3/3) 32', 39', 56'

Cardiff Arms Park
Attendance: 7,223
Referee: Mike Adamson (SRU)

=== Pool 5 ===
Pos	Team	Pld	W	D	L	PF	PA	PD	TF	TA	TB	LB	Pts
1	(Scotland) Edinburgh (3)	6	5	0	1	215	122	+93	30	15	3	1	24
2	(France) Stade Français (8)	6	4	0	2	152	108	+44	20	16	3	1	20
3	(England) Harlequins	6	3	0	3	230	113	+117	34	14	4	2	18
4	(Romania) Timișoara Saracens	6	0	0	6	26	280	−254	2	41	0	0	0

Source: espn.co.uk

13 October 2016
19:45

(1 BP) Harlequins (England)	43–21	(France) Stade Français
Try: Marler 5' c Marchant 18' m Visser (2) 21' c, 58' m Chisholm (2) 35' c, 41' m Yarde 79' c Con: Swiel (3/6) 5', 21', 35'; Jackson (1/1) 79'	Report	Try: Macalou 32' c Daguin 61' c Alberts 70' c Con: Plisson (3/3) 32', 61', 70'

Twickenham Stoop
Attendance: 11,820
Referee: Ben Whitehouse (WRU)

15 October 2016
14:00

Timișoara Saracens (Romania)	17–59	(Scotland) Edinburgh (1 BP)
Try: Shennan (2) 15' c, 74' c Con: Calafeteanu (2/2) 15', 74'; Pen: Calafeteanu (1/1) 9'	Report	Try: Allen 1' c Mata (2) 4' c, 48' c McInnaly (3) 12' m, 23' c, 31' m Manu (3) 33' c, 37' c, 62' c Con: Tovey (7/9) 1', 4', 23', 33', 37', 48', 62'

Stadionul Dan Păltinișanu
Attendance: 3,500
Referee: Ian Tempest (RFU)

20 October 2016
20:00

(1 BP) Stade Français (France)	27–0	(Romania) Timișoara Saracens
Try: Plisson 2' c Fartass 17' c Camara 20' m Nicolas 53' m Con: M. Steyn (2/4) 2', 17'; Pen: M. Steyn (1/1) 9'	Report

Stade Jean-Bouin
Attendance: 6,511
Referee: Tom Foley (RFU)

22 October 2016
15:15

(1 BP) Edinburgh (Scotland)	36–35	(England) Harlequins (2 BP)
Try: Dell 5' m Kinghorn 12' m Manu 20' c Watson 25' c Hoyland 40' c Brown 73' m Con: Tovey (2/4) 20', 25'; Kinghorn (1/2) 40'	Report	Try: Walker 2' c Penalty try (2) 38' c, 60' c Sinckler 44' c Luamanu 66' c Con: N. Evans (3/3) 3', 38', 44'; Swiel (2/2) 60', 66'

Murrayfield Stadium
Attendance: 5,326
Referee: Romain Poite (FFR)

10 December 2016
15:00

Timișoara Saracens (Romania)	3–42	(England) Harlequins (1 BP)
Pen: Calafeteanu (1/1) 20'	Report	Try: Ward 26' c Merrick 30' c Morris 34' c Walker (2) 41' c, 46' c Marchant 50' c Con: Jackson (6/6) 27', 31', 35', 41', 47', 51'

Stadionul Dan Păltinișanu
Attendance: 3,000
Referee: Lloyd Linton (SRU)

10 December 2016
19:45

Edinburgh (Scotland)	28–23	(France) Stade Français (1 BP)
Try: Hoyland 46' m Toolis 52' c Hidalgo-Clyne 61' c Con: Weir (2/3) 53', 62'; Pen: Weir (3/3) 33', 65', 79'	Report	Try: Nayacalevu 3' c Macalou 22' c Con: Steyn (2/2) 3', 23'; Pen: Steyn (2/2) 38', 58'; Drop: Steyn (1/1) 7'

Murrayfield Stadium
Attendance: 4,055
Referee: Craig Maxwell-Keys (RFU)

15 December 2016
20:45

(1 BP) Stade Français (France)	26–20	(Scotland) Edinburgh (1 BP)
Try: Bonfils 10' c Bonneval 18' m Penalty try 27' c Doumayrou 32' c Con: Plisson (3/4) 11', 28', 33'	Report	Try: McKenzie 45' m Mata 61' c Hidalgo-Clyne 78' m Con: Tovey (1/3) 62'; Pen: Tovey (1/1) 16'

Stade Jean-Bouin
Attendance: 7,347
Referee: Dudley Phillips (IRFU)

17 December 2016
15:00

(1 BP) Harlequins (England)	75–3	(Romania) Timișoara Saracens
Try: Wallace 7' c Visser 16' c Roberts (3) 21' c, 28' c, 60' c Brown (2) 35' c, 67' c Yarde (2) 45' c, 63' c Clifford 54' c Swiel 79' m Con: Jackson (5/5) 8', 17', 23', 29', 36'; Swiel (5/6) 46', 55', 60', 64', 68'	Report	Pen: Conache (1/2) 57'

Twickenham Stoop
Attendance: 9,642
Referee: Thomas Charabas (FFR)

14 January 2017
14:00

Timișoara Saracens (Romania)	Cancelled (Note: Due to a frozen pitch, the game was postponed.)	(France) Stade Français

Stadionul Dan Păltinișanu
Referee: Mike Adamson (SRU)

Due to cancelling the game, Timișoara Saracens were fined €30,000. Stade Français were awarded 5 match points in lieu of playing.

14 January 2017
15:00

(1 BP) Harlequins (England)	18–23	(Scotland) Edinburgh
Try: Luamanu 78' c Gray 80' m Con: Jackson (1/2) 79'; Pen: Swiel (2/3) 13', 33'	Report	Try: McKenzie 25' c Dell 53' c Con: Weir (2/2) 25', 54'; Pen: Weir (3/3) 10', 31', 71'

Twickenham Stoop
Attendance: 8,230
Referee: David Wilkinson (IRFU)

20 January 2017
19:35

(1 BP) Edinburgh (Scotland)	49–3	(Romania) Timișoara Saracens
Try: Cochrane (2) 11' c, 50' c du Preez 21' c Kinghorn 29' c Allen 38' c Tovey 62' c Hoyland 67' c Con: Weir (5/5) 12', 23', 30', 39', 51'; Tovey (2/2) 63', 67'	Report	Pen: Calafeteanu (1/1) 41'

New Myreside
Attendance: 5,235
Referee: Adam Jones (WRU)

22 January 2017
14:00

Stade Français (France)	27–17	(England) Harlequins
Try: Nayacalevu 15' c Arias 23' c Burden 51' c Con: Plisson (3/3) 16', 24', 52'; Pen: Plisson (2/3) 39', 44'	Report	Try: Luamanu 40' m Yarde 57' c J. Chisholm 77' m Con: Swiel (1/2) 58'

Stade Jean-Bouin
Attendance: 7,330
Referee: George Clancy (IRFU)

== See also ==
- 2016–17 European Rugby Challenge Cup
