= Josaia Raisuqe =

Fijian rugby union footballer (1994–2025)

- Born: Josaia Wini Raisuqe; 22 July 1994 Lutu, Naitasiri, Fiji
- Died: 8 May 2025 (aged 30) Saïx, Tarn, France
- Height: 1.93 m (6 ft 4 in)
- Weight: 113 kg (17 st 11 lb; 249 lb)

Rugby union career
- Position(s): Wing; Openside Flanker
Senior career
Years	Team	Apps	(Points)
2015–2017	Stade Français	17	(15)
2017–2021	Nevers	67	(155)
2021–2025	Castres	65	(75)
National sevens team
Years	Team		Comps
2015–2024	Fiji 7s		27
Medal record
Men's rugby sevens
Representing Fiji
Olympic Games
Silver medal – second place	2024 Paris	Team competition

Josaia Wini Raisuqe (22 July 1994 – 8 May 2025) was a Fijian rugby union player. He played at wing and openside flanker for French Top 14 side Stade Français after which he played for the French Rugby Pro D2 side, Nevers and in 2021, he returned to Top14 rugby and played for Castres. In January 2025, he signed to play with ProD2 side, CA Brive for two years.

== Career ==
=== Early career ===
Raisuqe was born in Lutu, Naitasiri and he took up rugby at a very young age. He dreamed of playing for the Fiji 7's team and it came to fruition when the then Fiji 7's coach Ben Ryan spotted him playing in the Martintar and Marist 7's and selected him for the Fiji 7's team for the 2015 Hong Kong Sevens. He played in five tournaments for Fiji scoring 14 tries but in July 2015, French Top 14 side, Stade Français signed him up for the 2015–16 Top 14 season.

=== Stade Français ===
Raisuqe made his debut on 31 October against Agen off the bench. He also made the side for the 2015–16 European Rugby Champions Cup pool stage. He scored two tries against Benetton Treviso. but in a game against Munster two weeks later, he was red carded for eye-gouging Munster captain CJ Stander and even though Stade won the game, Raisuqe was charged with eye-gouging and suspended for 15 weeks. He returned to rugby the following season and then went on to make the Stade side for the 2016–17 European Rugby Challenge Cup pool stage as Stade were demoted after failing to make the cut for the 2016–17 European Rugby Champions Cup after being unable to finish in the Top 8 in the 2015–16 Top 14 season. He helped Stade make the Cup Quarter-final but in their quarter-final match against Ospreys, he received a yellow card for foul play which was followed by another yellow card (and a red) after entering a ruck from the side but videos for the game showed he stamped on Osprey winger, Keelan Giles for which he was cited and later given a 10-week suspension.

=== Controversy ===
On 22 July 2017, Raisuqe decided to celebrate his birthday drinking at a club along with teammate, Waisea Nayacalevu. They both left the club intoxicated and on the way they met a woman. Raisuqe grabbed the woman and physically molested her by fondling her breasts. Her friends tried to help but both Raisuqe and Nayacalevu punched them. Raisuqe and Nayacalevu were picked up by police at around 3am and spent the whole day in jail. They were taken to court two days later and a trial date was set for 29 November.

On 18 August, Stade Français Paris fired Raisuqe for "gross misconduct" and gave Nayacalevu a formal warning.

=== Return to rugby ===
In September 2017, Raisuqe was picked up by Pro D2 side, Nevers for the 2017–18 Rugby Pro D2 season. He enjoyed an excellent 2018–19 season, helping his club to a top six finish, and was the league's top try scorer with 15 tries.

In January 2021, after winning a tough game against Béziers (30–25), he lifted the referee in the extra time and got sent off. He was subsequently banned for five weeks for that incident. To that point, Raisuqe had 10 yellow cards and 5 red cards to his name in French rugby as well as a yellow card he collected when playing with the Fiji 7's team.

He was part of the Fijian side that won a silver medal at the 2024 Summer Olympics in Paris.

== Death ==
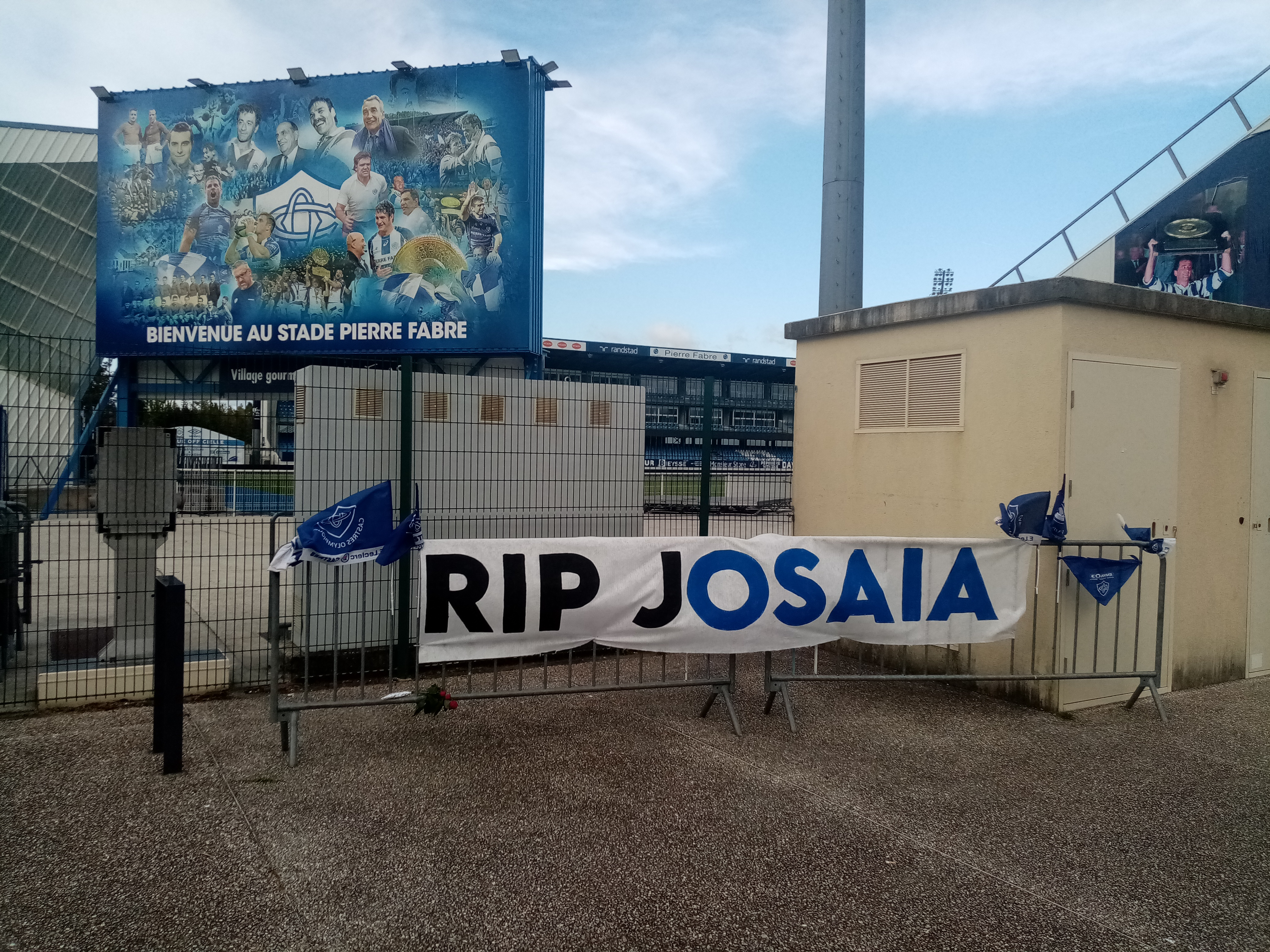
Memorial to Raisuqe after his death

On the morning of 8 May 2025, Raisuqe died after his car was hit by a train at a level crossing in Saïx, Tarn, France. He was 30.

== Honours ==
Personal

- Rugby Pro D2 top try scorer: 2018–19 (15 tries)
