= Jean-Claude Hiquet =

France international rugby union player (1939–2022)

- Born: 4 November 1939 Soustons, France
- Died: September 2022 (aged 82)
- Height: 1.65 m (5 ft 5 in)

Rugby union career
- Position: Fly-half
Senior career
Years	Team	Apps	(Points)
?–?	SU Agen	?	(?)
International career
Years	Team	Apps	(Points)
1964	France	1	(0)

Jean-Claude Hiquet (4 November 1939 – September 2022) was a French rugby union player who played as a fly-half. He played one match for the French national team on 22 February 1964 against England.

== Awards ==
- Winner of the French Division 1 (1962, 1965)
- Winner of the Challenge Yves du Manoir (1963)
