= 1960–61 French Rugby Union Championship =

French Rugby Championship 1960–61
- Countries: France
- Number of teams: 56
- Champions: Béziers (1st title)
- Runners-up: Dax

The French Rugby Union Championship 1960–61 was contested by 56 teams divided in 7 pools.

THE Béziers won the tournament beating the US Dax in the final.

== Context ==
The Five Nations Championship 1961 was won France

The Challenge Yves du Manoir was won by Mont-de-Marsan that beat the Béziers par 17 – 8.

== Qualification round ==
In bold the qualified to "last 32" phase

=== Pool 1 ===
- **Lourdes**
- Carmaux
- **Agen**
- **Cognac**
- Nantes
- Tyrosse
- **Brive**
- **Racing**

=== Pool 2 ===
- Dijon
- Lyon OU
- **SBUC**
- **Toulouse**
- **Béziers**
- **Stadoceste**
- Foix
- **Bayonne**

=== Pool 3 ===
- Narbonne
- Paris Université Club
- Saint-Sever
- **Angoulême**
- **Dax**
- **Cahors**
- **Périgueux**
- Toulouse Olympique EC

=== Pool 4 ===
- La Teste
- Saint-Girons
- **La Rochelle**
- Hendaye
- **Pau**
- **Aurillac**
- La Voulte
- **Auch**

=== Pool 5 ===
- Le Creusot
- **Mont-de-Marsan**
- **Perpignan**
- Soustons
- **Touloun**
- Bègles
- **Mazamet**
- **Grenoble**

=== Pool 6 ===
- Marmande
- **Graulhet**
- Montauban
- **Tulle**
- **Romans**
- **Montferrand**
- Biarritz
- **Saint-Claude**

=== Pool 7 ===
- Bergerac
- **Vichy**
- Chalon
- **Chambéry**
- Castres
- **Vienne**
- US Bressane
- **Limoges**

== "Last 32" ==
In bold the clubs qualified for the next round

Team 1	Team 2	Results
Béziers	Stadoceste	6-0
Touloun	Périgueux	8-6
Vichy	Montferrand	10-3
Lourdes	Aurillac	3-0
Mont-de-Marsan	Perpignan	16-6
Grenoble	Vienne	14-3
Brive	Limoges	16-5
Cahors	Saint-Claude	0-0
Dax	Romans	9-3
SBUC	Agen	12-11
La Rochelle	Racing	15-0
Bayonne	Graulhet	6-0
Chambéry	Cognac	13-6
Auch	Tulle	9-0
Mazamet	Toulose	16-8
Pau	Angoulême	20-3

== "Last 16" ==
In bold the clubs qualified for the next round

Team 1	Team 2	Results
Béziers	Toulon	14-0
Vichy	Lourdes	6-3
Mont-de-Marsan	Grenoble	10-6
Brive	Cahors	8-3
Dax	SBUC	14-3
La Rochelle	Bayonne	5-3
Chambéry	Auch	5-3
Mazamet	Pau	8-3

== Quarter of finals ==
In bold the clubs qualified for the next round

Team 1	Team 2	Results
**Béziers**	Vichy	**12-3**
**Mont-de-Marsan**	Brive	**12-6**
**Dax**	La Rochelle	**11-9**
**Chambéry**	Mazamet	**19-3**

== Semifinals ==
Team 1	Team 2	Results
**Béziers**	Mont-de-Marsan	**12-6**
**Dax**	Chambéry	**11-5**

== Final ==
Teams	**Béziers** - Dax
Score	**6-3**
Date	28 May 1961
Venue	Stade Gerland, Lyon
Referee	Bernard Marie
Line-up
Béziers	Raoul Barrière, Emile Bolzan, Francis Mas, Jean Salas, André Gayraud, Louis Angeli, François Rondi, Jean Arnal, Pierre Danos, Roger Bousquet, Lucien Rogé, Robert Raynal, Jacques Fratangelle, Robert Spagnolo, Paul Dedieu
Dax	Jean Bachélé, Léon Berho, André Bérilhe, Christian Lasserre, Marcel Cassiède, Gaston Dubois, Pierre Darbos, Claude Contis, Jean-Claude Lasserre, Pierre Albaladejo, Raymond Albaladejo, Jacques Bénédé, Jean Othats, Claude Darbos, Emile Carrère
Scorers
Béziers	1 penalty Dedieu, 1 drop Danos
Dax	1 penalty Pierre Albaladejo
