= Claude Darbos =

French rugby union player (1936–2016)

- Born: Claude Darbos; 10 October 1936 Saint-Paul-lès-Dax, France
- Died: 7 November 2016 (aged 80) Saint-Paul-lès-Dax, France
- Height: 182 cm (6 ft 0 in)
- Notable relative: Pierre Darbos (brother)
- Occupation: Rugby union player

Rugby union career
- Position: wing
Youth career
- -: US Dax
Amateur team(s)
Years	Team	Apps	(Points)
- US Dax
Senior career
Years	Team	Apps	(Points)
–	US Dax		

Claude Darbos (10 October 1936 – 7 November 2016) was a French rugby union player who played as winger. He completed his entire career with the French club of the US Dax.

== Biography ==
Claude Darbos joins the US Dax in junior category.

He is the brother of Pierre Darbos, also a rugby player.

During his career at the top level, he played in 1961 and 1963 the final of the French Rugby Union Championship, but did not win. After retirement, he became a coach at the US Dax rugby school.

He died on November 7, 2016, at the age of 80.

== Honours ==
- French Rugby Union Championship
  - Runners-up: 1961, 1963
