= 1972–73 French Rugby Union Championship =

French Rugby Championship 1972–73
- Countries: France
- Number of teams: 64
- Champions: Stadoceste (2nd title)
- Runners-up: Dax

The 1972–73 French Rugby Union Championship was contested by 64 teams divided in 8 pools.

The first four of each pool, were qualified for the knockout stages.

The Stadoceste won the championship beating Dax in the final.

It was the first title after World War II for Stadoceste.

== Qualification round ==
In bold the clubs qualified for the next round. The teams are listed according to the final ranking

**Pool 1**

- **Béziers**
- **Montferrand**
- **Stade Bagnérais**
- **Lourdes**
- Auch
- Montauban
- Chalon
- Avenir Aturin (promoted from second division)

**Pool 2**

- **Brive**
- **Valence**
- **Graulhet**
- **La Rochelle**
- Mont-de-Marsan
- Mauléon
- Bergerac
- Olympique Besançon (Besançon) (promoted from second division)

**Pool 3**

- **Touloun**
- **La Voulte**
- **US Bressane**
- **Boucau**
- Saint-Jean-de-Luz
- Tulle
- Chambéry
- Limoges (promoted from second division)

**Pool 4**

- **Narbonne**
- **Biarritz**
- **Castres**
- **Bègles**
- Oloron
- Saint-Claude
- Gaillac
- SA Bordeaux-Mérignac (promoted from second division)

**Pool 5**

- **Agen**
- **Grenoble**
- **Saint-Girons** (promoted from second division)
- **Dijon**
- Lyon OU
- Rodez(Rodez)
- Tyrosse
- Romans

**Pool 6**

- **Dax**
- **Aurillac**
- **Stadoceste**
- **Racing**
- UA MImizan (Mimizan) (promoted from second division)
- Montchanin
- Condom (Condom)
- Poitiers

**Pool 7**

- **Perpignan**
- **Lavelanet**
- **Bayonne**
- **Pau**
- RRC Nice (promoted from second division)
- Marmande
- Quillan
- Soustons

**Pool 8**

- **Stade Beaumontois**
- **Avignon Saint-Saturnin**
- **Toulouse**
- **Vichy**
- Fumel Libos
- Carmaux (promoted from second division)
- Périgueux
- Cognac

== Knockout stages ==
=== "Last 32" ===
In bold the clubs qualified for the next round

Team 1	Team 2	Results
Saint-Girons	**Stade Bagnérais**	10-20
**Perpignan**	Aurillac	10-6
Grenoble	**Graulhet**	4-12
**Agen**	Dijon	16-6
**Stadoceste**	Racing	7-3
**Narbonne**	US Bressane	16-9
**Touloun**	Lavelanet	19-10
**La Voulte**	Castres	10-0
**Brive**	Lourdes	28-6
**Montferrand**	Pau	29-7
**Dax**	Vichy	16-14
**Valence**	Boucau	9-6
**Béziers**	Bègles	26-8
**Toulouse**	Biarritz	30-19
Avignon Saint-Saturnin	**Bayonne**	4-15
**Stade Beaumontois**	La Rochelle	11-6

=== "Last 16" ===
In bold the clubs qualified for the next round

Team 1	Team 2	Results
Stade Bagnérais	**Perpignan**	9-19
**Graulhet**	Agen	12-7
**Stadoceste**	Narbonne	12-11
Toulon	**La Voulte**	7-14
**Brive**	Montferrand	18-9
**Dax**	Valence	34-12
**Béziers**	Toulose	21-12
**Bayonne**	Stade Beaumontois	16-15

=== Quarter of finals ===
In bold the clubs qualified for the next round

Team 1	Team 2	Results
**Perpignan**	Graulhet	**10-3**
**Stadoceste**	La Voulte	**15-3**
Brive	**Dax**	**10-16**
**Béziers**	Bayonne	**28-12**

=== Semifinals ===
Team 1	Team 2	Results
Perpignan	**Stadoceste**	**0-6**
**Dax**	Béziers	**23-3**

== Final ==
Teams	Stadoceste - Dax
Score	18-12
Date	20 May 1973
Venue	Stadium Municipal, Toulouse
Referee	André Cuny
Line-up
Stadoceste	Lucien Abadie, Antoine Marin, Gilbert Verdier, Francis Sénac, Francis Biescas, Claude Cabar, Patrick Leblanc, Christian Paul, Alain Save, Daniel Marty, Jean Sillières, Fernand Marin, Joël Pécune, Jean-Louis Montagne, Georges Michel
Dax	Pierre Duclos, Jacques Ibanez, Christian Hoursiangou, Jean-Pierre Bastiat, Bernard Dutin, Yves Courrouy, Gilles Benali, Bernard Vinsonneau, Georges Capdepuy, Patrick Freicha, Bernard Trémont, Jean-Pierre Lux, Philippe Lebel, Michel Arrieumerlou, Jean-Paul Cazenave
Scorers
Stadoceste	2 tries Biescas and Pécune, 2 conversions, 1 penalty and 1 drop Michel
Dax	1 try Arrieumerlou, 1 conversion Duclos, 1 drop Freicha
