= Pierre Darbos =

French rugby union player (1939–2017)

- Born: Pierre Darbos; 10 December 1939 Saint-Paul-lès-Dax, France
- Died: 18 November 2017 (aged 77) Pau, France
- Height: 180 cm (5 ft 11 in)
- Notable relative: Claude Darbos (brother)
- Occupation: Rugby union player

Rugby union career
- Position: Third line wing
Youth career
- -: US Dax
Amateur team(s)
Years	Team	Apps	(Points)
- US Dax
Senior career
Years	Team	Apps	(Points)
–	US Dax (1958-1962, 1965-1971)		
International career
Years	Team	Apps	(Points)
1969	France		

Pierre Darbos (10 December 1939 – 18 November 2017) was a French rugby union player who played as flanker. He completed his entire career with the French club of the US Dax. With an international selection with the France team, he plays most of his career in the US Dax, but also RC Narbonne.

== Biography ==
Pierre Darbos begins the practice of rugby XV with the club of high school of Dax called Genêts from the season 1952-1953. He is the brother of Claude Darbos, also a rugby player, whom joined the US Dax the same year. Under the direction of Jean Desclaux, he won with the cadets the championship of France twice, in 1955 and 1956.

He wears from the youth categories the jersey of the French team, from his first season in the club Acquois. He also played the same year, his first match with the first team of the US Dax, in the context of the semi-final Challenge Yves du Manoir in 1952, conceded against the Section Paloise; third line training wing, he played this match at center post.

Pierre Darbos officially joins the ranks of the first team from the 1958-1959 season, being initially called to play mainly Challenge Yves du Manoir meetings; he won the 1959 edition of the competition, beating the Pau-finals section in the final, which he played alongside Claude Contis, his team-mate since the junior category. He then plays his first French Rugby Union Championship in 1961, but lose against AS Béziers.

At the beginning of the 1961-1962 season, Darbos became a regular holder of the USD once his military service was completed. After a semifinal loss in overtime against SU Agen, he made a request for a sport transfer, and then joined RC Narbonne. He played three seasons in the Aude club, during which he won a national selection with the France B team, and reached the semi-final of the national championship in 1964. He rubs shoulders with the Spanghero brothers during their debut.

After an elimination in the round of 32 in 1965, Darbos chose to return to his training club. On his return, he fights the 1966 final lost to SU Agen, and loses two years later the final of the Challenge against his former teammates RC Narbonne. He nevertheless obtained consolation by winning the Challenge final the following season, at the expense of FC Grenoble. Eager to join the France team for the Springbok tour, he follows a suitable training program, but is not called.

After a demonstration in front of the members of the French Rugby Federation, in the context of a confrontation on the ground of Fumel to celebrate the inauguration of their new stadium, Pierre Darbos is called the following day in honorary selection for a meeting against a selection Romanian, played in Bucharest in November 1969. A few weeks later, he was finally selected in the national team, receiving his first international cape on December 14 during the annual confrontation against Romania; Darbos and the France team won 14–9 in Tarbes. Darbos also shares his first selection with another player from Acquire, Jean-Pierre Bastiat. He finally ended his playing career a year later, having won one last time the Challenge Yves du Manoir, this time against Stade Toulousain, as a substitute.

For his professional reconversion, he moved to Bayonne with his wife Anne, occupying the position of commercial director of the local brand Lapeyre group.

He died on November 18, 2017, in Pau, at the age of 77.

== Honours ==
- Championship of France junior rugby union
  - Winners: 1955, 1956 with the US Dax
- French Rugby Union Championship
  - Runners-up: 1961, 1966 with US Dax
- Challenge Yves du Manoir
  - Winners: 1959, 1969, 1971 with US Dax
  - Runners-up: 1952, 1968 with US Dax
