= Telefoni =

Telefoni may refer to:

== People ==
- Semisi Telefoni (born 1982), New Zealand-born Tongan rugby union player
- Misa Telefoni Retzlaff (born 1952), Samoan author

== Other uses ==
- Telefoni Bianchi, film genre
