= Mathieu Dourthe =

France international rugby union player

- Born: Mathieu Dourthe; 22 July 1976 (age 50) Dax, France
- Height: 1.74 m (5 ft 8 1/2 in)
- Weight: 72 kg (11 st 5 lb)

Rugby union career
- Position: Wing / Fullback /
Senior career
Years	Team	Apps	(Points)
- US Pouillon
–	US Dax		
–	SU Agen Lot-et-Garonne		
–	Section Paloise		
–	FC Lourdes		
International career
Years	Team	Apps	(Points)
2000	France	1	

Mathieu Dourthe (born 22 July 1976 in Dax, France) is a French rugby union player whose usual position is at a fullback. Prior to joining Section Paloise, he played for US Dax and SU Agen Lot-et-Garonne. He earned his only cap for France on 18 November 2000 against All Blacks.
