= Georges Michel (rugby union) =

French rugby union player (1946–2022)

- Date of birth: 9 December 1946
- Place of birth: Juillan, France
- Date of death: 8 March 2022 (aged 75)
- Place of death: France
- Height: 1.82 m (6 ft 0 in)

Rugby union career
- Position(s): Fullback
Senior career
Years	Team	Apps	(Points)
?–?	Tarbes Pyrénées Rugby	?	(?)

Georges Michel (9 December 1946 – 8 March 2022) was a French rugby union player. After his playing career, he worked for Mutualité Sociale Agricole des Hautes-Pyrénées. He died on 8 March 2022, at the age of 75.

== Awards ==
- Finalist in the 1964 Coupe Frantz-Reichel
- Finalist in the 1968 Challenge Antoine Béguère
- Winner of the 1972–73 French Rugby Union Championship
