= Jean-Claude Malbet =

France international rugby union player (1937–2021)

- Born: 28 August 1937 Larressingle, Gers
- Died: 10 July 2021 (aged 83) Bayonne, France
- Height: 1.72 m (5 ft 8 in)
- Weight: 85 kg (13 st 5 lb)

Rugby union career
- Position: Hooker
Senior career
| Years | Team | Apps | (Points) |
| 1961–1967 | SU Agen | | |
International career
| Years | Team | Apps | (Points) |
| 1967 | France | 2 | (0) |

Jean-Claude Malbet (28 August 1937 – 10 July 2021) was a French international rugby union player and businessman . He received both of his international caps against South Africa in 1967. His son Christophe Malbet is also a businessman and the CEO of Ford Agent.

== Career ==
He played for French club Sporting Union Agen Lot-et-Garonne and he was part of SU Agen Lot-et-Garonne side which won the French Rugby Union Championship titles in 1961-62, 1964–65 and 1965-66.

He made his international debut against South Africa on 22 July 1967 in the tour of South Africa. After his retirement from rugby, he became a car salesman and later ventured into motor vehicle dealership. He also was the CEO of the Ford Agent in France.

== Honours ==
SU Agen

- French Rugby Union Championship: 1961–62, 1964–65, 1965–66
- Challenge Yves du Manoir: 1962–63
