= Gérard Murillo =

France international rugby union player and manager (1932–2023)

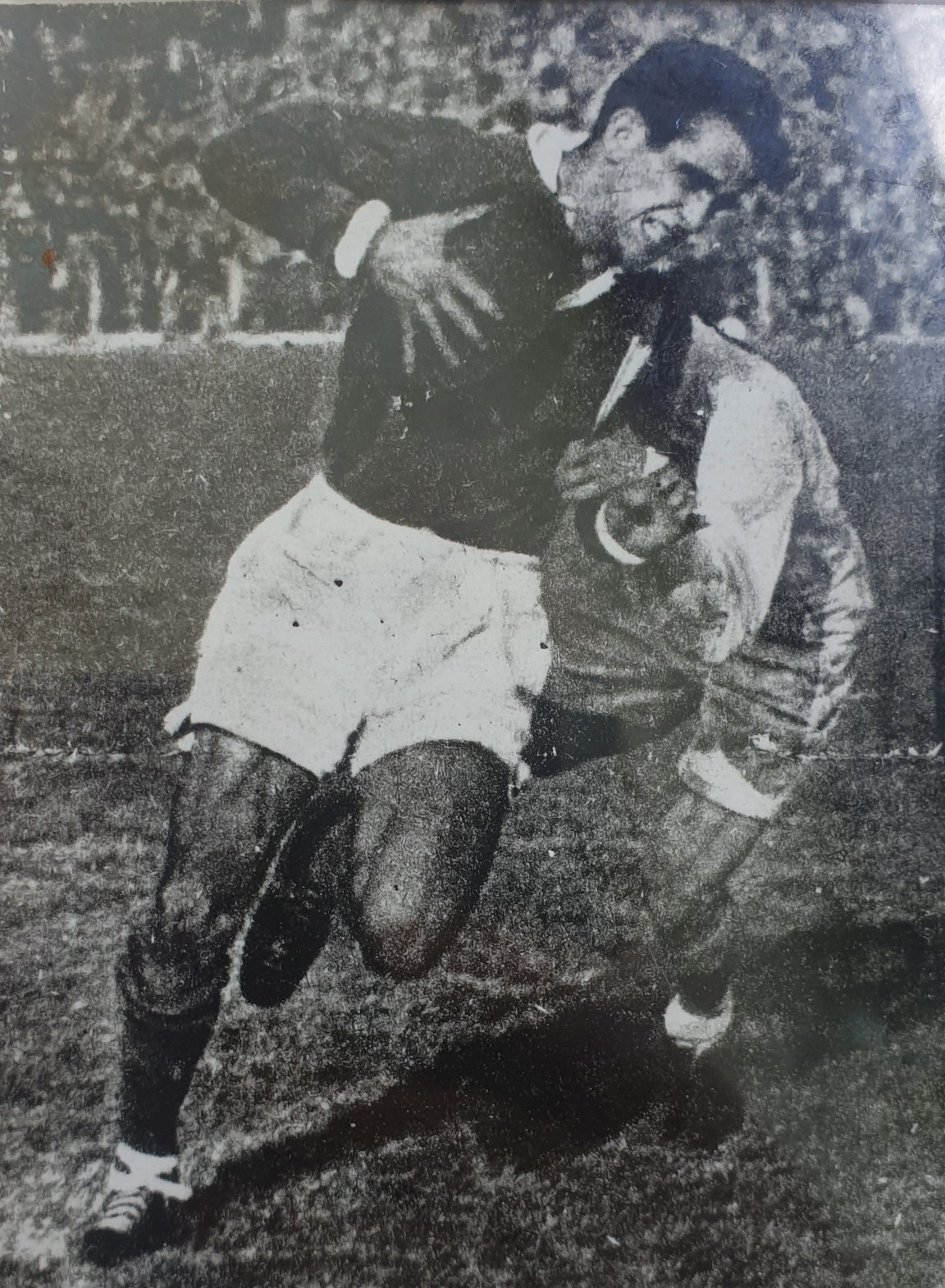
- Murillo in 1954
- Born: 9 February 1932 Paris, France
- Died: 11 October 2023 (aged 91) Ciboure, Pyrénées-Atlantiques, Nouvelle-Aquitaine, France

Rugby union career
Senior career
Years	Team	Apps	(Points)
- Stade Dijonnais
International career
Years	Team	Apps	(Points)
1954	France		
Coaching career
- Years: Team
- 1986-1992: Spain

Gérard Murillo (9 February 1932 – 11 October 2023) was a French rugby union player and manager.

== Biography ==
Born in Paris on 9 February 1932, Murillo played for Stade Dijonnais. He played his first international match for France on 24 April 1954 against Italy, and his last on 29 August 1954 against Argentina. As a manager, he briefly coached the Spanish national team between 1986 and 1992, having also been manager for Saint-Jean-de-Luz olympique rugby from 1962 to 1981.

Gérard Murillo died in Ciboure on 11 October 2023 at the age of 91.
