= Pierre Besson =

French rugby union player (born 1940)

- Born: 11 April 1940 (age 86) Saint-Astier, Dordogne, France
- Height: 5 ft 5 in (165 cm)
- Weight: 146 lb (66 kg)

Rugby union career
- Position: Wing
International career
Years	Team	Apps	(Points)
1963–68	France	5	(0)

Pierre Besson (born 11 April 1940) is a French former international rugby union player.

Besson was born in Saint-Astier, Dordogne, and competed in athletics during his youth, winning the Limousin junior long jump championship. He underwent military service with the Joinville Battalion.

A speedy winger, Besson played his club rugby for CA Brive in the 1960s alongside younger brother Claude, who was also a three-quarter. He made his debut for France against Scotland in the 1963 Five Nations Championship. Scotland won the match with a last-minute try after a loose ball bounced awkwardly over Besson's head and was gathered by his opposite winger Ronnie Thomson He featured twice more during their Five Nations campaign and didn't gain another cap until 1965, when he returned for a match against Romania in Lyon. In 1968, Besson appeared in the first of France's two home Tests against the Springboks.

Besson later served as head coach of CA Brive and is a former president of the club's alumni association.

== See also ==
- List of France national rugby union players
