= Uilisi Halaholo =

New Zealand rugby union player

Willis Halaholo
- Full name: Sean Alfred Uilisi Halaholo
- Born: 6 July 1990 (age 36) Auckland, New Zealand
- Height: 1.80 m (5 ft 11 in)
- Weight: 105 kg (231 lb; 16 st 7 lb)
- School: Mount Albert Grammar School

Rugby union career
- Position: Centre
- Current team: Bay of Plenty/Tonga
Senior career
Years	Team	Apps	(Points)
2013–2015	Southland	33	(50)
2015–2016	Hurricanes	18	(10)
2016	Waikato	10	(10)
2016–2024	Cardiff Rugby	112	(95)
2024	Bay of Plenty	13	(5)
- Correct as of 2 July 2025
International career
Years	Team	Apps	(Points)
2009	Tonga U20	5	(0)
2021–2022	Wales	9	(0)
2025-	Tonga	2	(0)
- Correct as of 3 July 2025

Sean Alfred Uilisi Halaholo (born 6 July 1990 in New Zealand) is a professional rugby union player, who currently plays as a centre for Bay of Plenty in New Zealand's domestic National Provincial Championship competition. He previously played for Cardiff Rugby in the United Rugby Championship and European Professional Club Rugby competitions, became a Super Rugby champion with the Hurricanes and played for Southland and Waikato in the NPC.

Halaholo was born in Auckland, New Zealand, to parents of Tongan descent, but has represented Wales internationally after becoming eligible to play for that country on residency grounds. Halaholo later represented Tonga due to a three stand down period from playing for Wales.

== Early career ==
Halaholo attended Mount Albert Grammar School and played for the school's 1st XV team that won the Auckland Secondary Schools title in 2007 and were runners-up in New Zealand's National First XV Championship that same year.

After finishing secondary school, Halaholo began his premier club rugby career with Grammar Carlton before moving to Silverdale and then returning to his junior club Suburbs.

== Club career ==
=== ITM Cup and Super Rugby teams ===
It was while playing for Suburbs that Halaholo caught the attention of Southland selectors and he headed to New Zealand's far south to gain his ITM Cup break with the Stags in 2013. He made a big impact in Invercargill and after two seasons with the Stags, he was named in the Hurricanes squad for the 2015 Super Rugby season.

Stuck behind the All Blacks midfield combination of Ma'a Nonu and Conrad Smith, Halaholo made only three appearances off the bench for the Hurricanes that season. For 2016, Halaholo was offered a wider training squad contract. He started the season on the bench, but finished it in the starting team that won the Hurricanes' first Super Rugby title, defeating the Lions 20–3 in the final at Westpac Stadium.

Halaholo signed with Waikato for the 2016 Mitre 10 Cup season. He made his debut for the province on 21 August 2016 against Tasman and went on to play ten games for the Mooloos.

=== Cardiff ===
After finishing his season with Waikato, Halaholo joined Cardiff on a three-year contract. He played his first Pro 12 game for Cardiff on 4 November 2016 in a 34–28 win over Benetton Treviso, scoring the match-winning try on debut. His European Rugby Challenge Cup debut followed on 10 December 2016 against Bath. On 11 May 2018, he was part of the Cardiff team that lifted the Challenge Cup after beating Gloucester 31–30 in the 2017–18 European Rugby Challenge Cup Final.

In May 2024, Cardiff announced that Halaholo would be leaving the club and return to New Zealand, having played 112 games for the club.

=== Bay of Plenty ===
Back in New Zealand, Halaholo joined Bay of Plenty for the 2024 Bunnings NPC season. With his new team, he reached the NPC final, which they narrowly lost 23–20 to Wellington in extra time.

== International career ==
=== New Zealand Schools and Tonga U20 ===
Halaholo was named in the 2007 New Zealand Secondary Schools team alongside future All Blacks Tawera Kerr-Barlow, Elliot Dixon and Charlie Ngatai for their tour of Australia.

In 2009, Halaholo played for Tonga U20 at the IRB Junior World Championship in Japan.

=== Wales ===
Halaholo was named in the Wales squad for the first time for the uncapped international against the Barbarians on 30 November 2019 after qualifying for Wales through the 3-year residency rule, but was ruled out of the match with a long-term knee injury that he suffered while playing a Challenge Cup match with Cardiff against Leicester Tigers on 23 November 2019.

Following injuries to fellow midfielders Johnny Williams, Jonathan Davies and George North, Halaholo was recalled to the Wales squad for their 2021 Six Nations Championship match against Scotland on 13 February 2021. With Nick Tompkins and Owen Watkin picked to start, Halaholo was named on the bench for the game. He made his international debut in the 32nd minute, when fullback Leigh Halfpenny went off for a head injury assessment. He played a total of 10 tests for Wales. after being inactive to play for the Wales national rugby union team.

=== Tonga ===
In July 2025, Halaholo was named in the Tongan national rugby union team.
