= Claude Dufau =

French rugby player and manager (1946–2021)

Claude Dufau (29 April 1946 – 9 June 2021) was a French rugby player and manager.

In 1958, he entered the Union sportive dacquoise's rugby school. On 23 December 1962 he was called up for the first time with the club, when he was only 16 years old.
