= Leandro Cedaro =

Argentine-Italian rugby union player (born 1988)

- Born: Leandro Luis Cedaro; February 16, 1988 (age 38) Resistencia, Argentina
- Height: 1.95 m (6 ft 5 in)
- Weight: 120 kg (18 st 13 lb; 265 lb)

Rugby union career
- Position: lock
Senior career
| Years | Team | Apps | (Points) |
| 2009–2010 | Vannes | 20 | (10) |
| 2010–2012 | Stade Montois | 54 | (10) |
| 2012−2017 | La Rochelle | 136 | (25) |
| 2017−2018 | Agen | 5 | (0) |
| 2018− | Stade Montois | | |
- Correct as of 8 June 2014
International career
| Years | Team | Apps | (Points) |
| 2012 | Emerging Italy | 3 | (0) |
| 2013 | Italy | 1 | (0) |

Leandro Luis Cedaro (born 16 February 1988) is an Argentine-born Italian rugby union player. Debutó en Regatas Resistencia He plays as a prop and as a lock. Cedaro currently plays for Stade Montois in Pro D2.

In 2012 Cedaro was named in the Emerging Italy squad. He counts 1 caps for Italy, since his debut at 22 June 2013.
