= Christophe Milhères =

French rugby union player (born 1972)

- Born: Christophe Milhères; 3 January 1972 (age 54) Bayonne, France
- Height: 1.85 m (6 ft 1 in)
- Weight: 93 kg (14 st 9 lb)
- Occupation: Rugby union coach

Rugby union career
- Position: Flanker
Youth career
- 1987-1995: Union Sportive Tyrosse Rugby Côte Sud
Senior career
Years	Team	Apps	(Points)
-1997	US Dax		
1997-2005	Biarritz		
2005-2007	US Dax		
International career
Years	Team	Apps	(Points)
1996-1999	France	1	
Coaching career
- Years: Team
- 2007-2010: US Dax

Christophe Milhères (born 3 January 1972, in Bayonne), is a former French rugby union player. He played as a flanker.

Milhères played for Biarritz Olympique from 1997/98 to 2004/05, where he twice won the French Championship, in 2001/02 and 2004/05. He then moved to US Dax in 2005. He became coach of US Dax in 2007 after the nomination of Marc Lièvremont.

== Honours ==
- French rugby champion, 2002, 2005 with Biarritz Olympique
