= Semisi Telefoni =

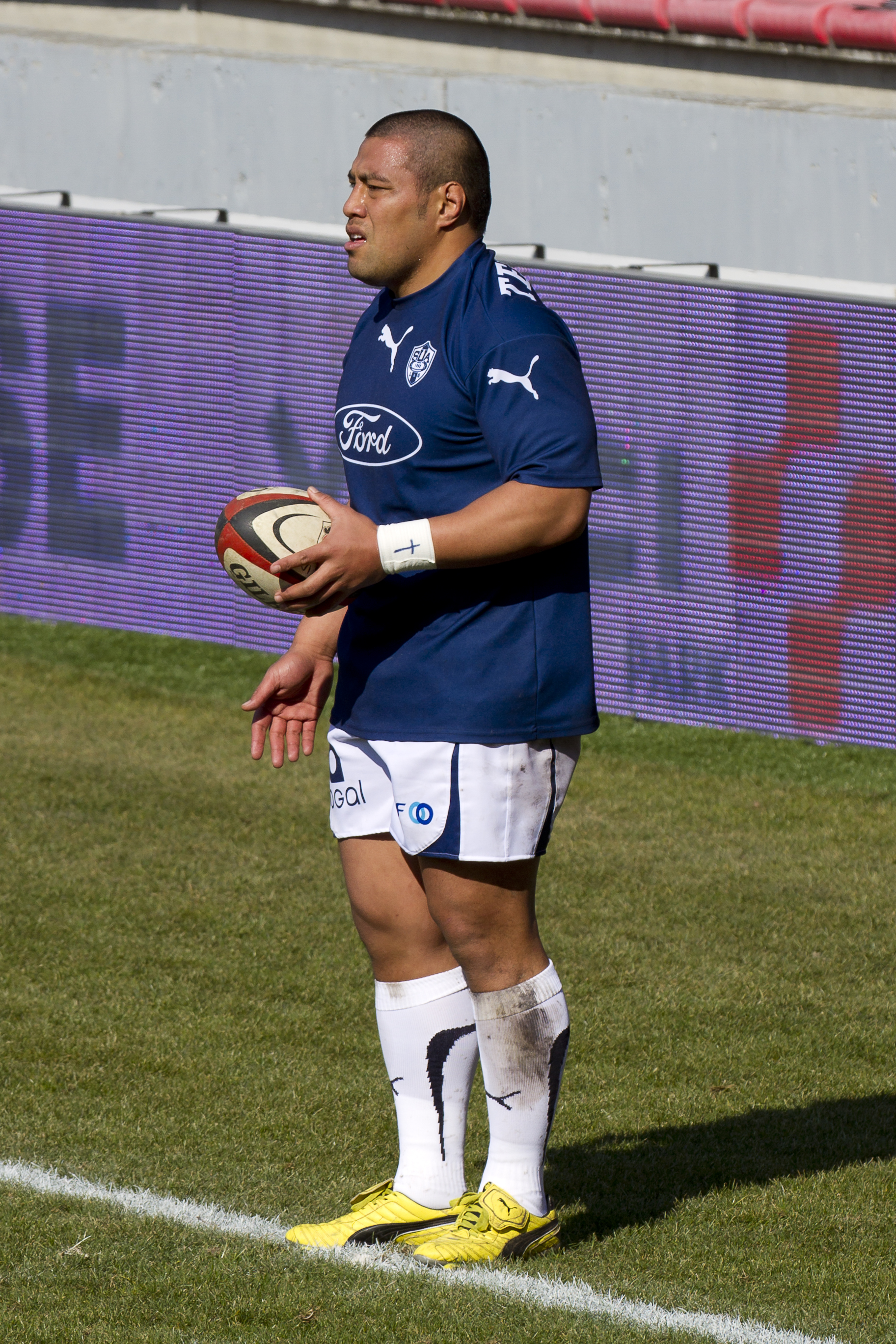
- Born: Semisi Fonua Telefoni; 22 December 1982 (age 43) Auckland, New Zealand
- Height: 6 ft 1 in (1.85 m)
- Weight: 113 kg (249 lb)

Rugby union career
- Position: Hooker
Senior career
Years	Team	Apps	(Points)
2006-2009	Stade Dijonnais Côte D'Or	44	(15)
2009-2015	SU Agen	145	(45)
2015-2017	US Carcassonne	34	(5)
Provincial / State sides
Years	Team	Apps	(Points)
2004–2006	Auckland	17	(0)
International career
Years	Team	Apps	(Points)
2008–2011	Tonga	5	(0)

Semisi Telefoni (born 22 December 1982) is a New Zealand born Tongan rugby union player. He played for Auckland from 2004 to 2005. He debuted for Tonga against Japan in 2008. He played for French club SU Agen from 2009 to 2015, and since 2015 has played for US Carcassonne.
