= Paul Bonnefond =

French rugby union player

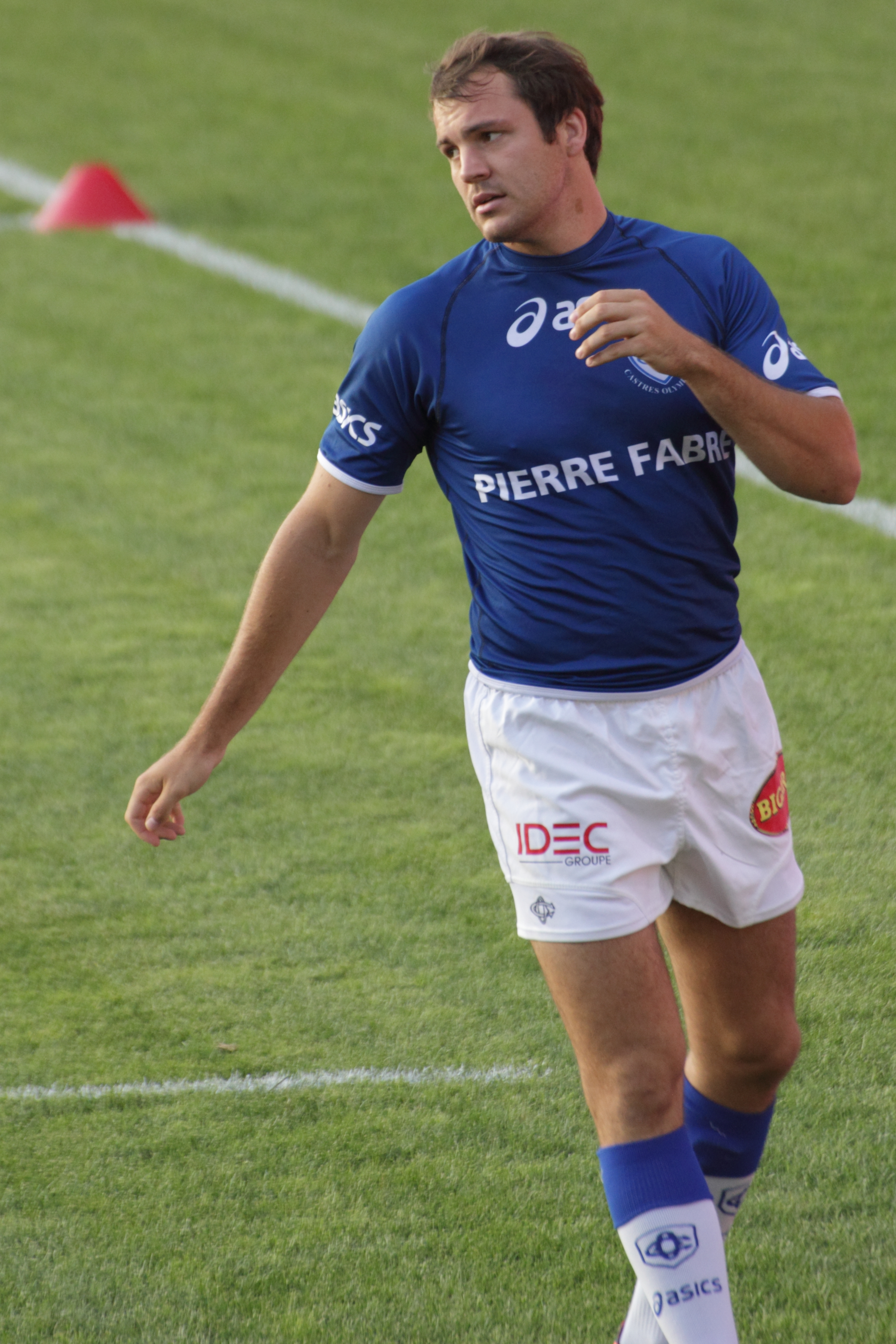
- Born: 13 September 1988 (age 38) Tours, France
- Height: 1.89 m (6 ft 2 1/2 in)
- Weight: 90 kg (14 st 2 lb)

Rugby union career
- Position: Wing
Senior career
Years	Team	Apps	(Points)
2008–2010	Castres Olympique	29	(20)
2010–2011	US Oyonnax	12	(0)
2011–2017	Castres Olympique	66	(40)
- Correct as of 22 March 2014

Paul Bonnefond (born 13 September 1988) is a French rugby union player. He plays on the wing and currently plays for Castres Olympique in the Top 14. He began his career with Castres before moving to US Oyonnax for a season. He returned to Castres Olympique in 2011.

== Honours ==
=== Club ===
(France) Castres

- Top 14: 2012–13
