= Sami Mavinga =

French rugby union footballer

- Born: Sami Mavinga; 25 March 1993 (age 33)
- Height: 5 ft 11 in (180 cm)
- Weight: 253 lb (115 kg)

Rugby union career
- Position: Prop
- Current team: Perpignan
Senior career
| Years | Team | Apps | (Points) |
| 2013-2017 | Lyon OU | 30 | (5) |
| 2017-2019 | Newcastle Falcons | 26 | (5) |
| 2019-2021 | Stade Français | 28 | (0) |
| 2021-2022 | Perpignan | 14 | (0) |
| 2022-2023 | Carcassonne | 23 | (0) |
| 2023- | Ealing Trailfinders | 1 | (0) |
| 2013- | Total | 122 | (10) |
- Correct as of 5 April 2024

Sami Mavinga (born 25 March 1993) is a French rugby union player for Perpignan in France’s Top 14, the top tier. Mavinga is a prop and has previously played for Lyon OU and Stade Français Paris in France's Pro D2 and Top 14. He has also represented Newcastle Falcons in England’s Premiership Rugby.

== Career ==
Mavinga joined LOU as a 13 year old and played for them in Pro D2 as well as the European Rugby Challenge Cup. On 27 March 2017, Mavinga's signing was announced by Newcastle Falcons in England. After two impressive seasons in England, Mavinga returned to France signing a contract with Stade Français in Paris.
