= 1963 Five Nations Championship =

Rugby union competition

- Date: 12 January - 23 March 1963
- Countries: England; Ireland; France; Scotland; Wales

Tournament statistics
- Champions: England (17th title)
- Matches played: 10

The 1963 Five Nations Championship was the thirty-fourth series of the rugby union Five Nations Championship. Including the previous incarnations as the Home Nations and Five Nations, this was the sixty-ninth series of the northern hemisphere rugby union championship. Ten matches were played between 12 January and 23 March. It was contested by England, France, Ireland, Scotland and Wales. England won their 17th title.

Ireland v England finished 0-0, the first scoreless draw between both teams since 1910. This is also (as of 2025) the last 0-0 draw to have happened in the Five or Six Nations Championship, and the second-last known scoreless draw in international rugby (being followed only by a Scotland/NZ shutout in 1964).

== Participants ==
The teams involved were:

Nation	Venue	City	Captain
England	Twickenham	London	Richard Sharp
France	Stade Olympique Yves-du-Manoir	Colombes	Pierre Lacroix
Ireland	Lansdowne Road	Dublin	Tom Kiernan/Bill Mulcahy
Scotland	Murrayfield	Edinburgh	Ken Scotland
Wales	National Stadium	Cardiff	Clive Rowlands

== Table ==
Pos	Team	Pld	W	D	L	PF	PA	PD	Pts
1	England	4	3	1	0	29	19	+10	7
2	France	4	2	0	2	40	25	+15	4
2	Scotland	4	2	0	2	22	22	0	4
4	Ireland	4	1	1	2	19	33	−14	3
5	Wales	4	1	0	3	21	32	−11	2

== Results ==
1963-01-12

France	6–11	Scotland

Paris

1963-01-19

Wales	6–13	England

Cardiff

1963-01-26

Ireland	5–24	France

Dublin

1963-02-02

England	6–5	France

London

1963-02-02

Scotland	3–0	Ireland

Edinburgh

1963-02-23

Scotland	0–6	Wales

Edinburgh

1963-02-23

Ireland	0–0	England

Dublin

1963-03-09

Wales	6–14	Ireland

Cardiff

1963-03-16

England	10–8	Scotland

London

1963-03-23

France	5–3	Wales

Paris
