= Lucien Rogé =

France international rugby union player

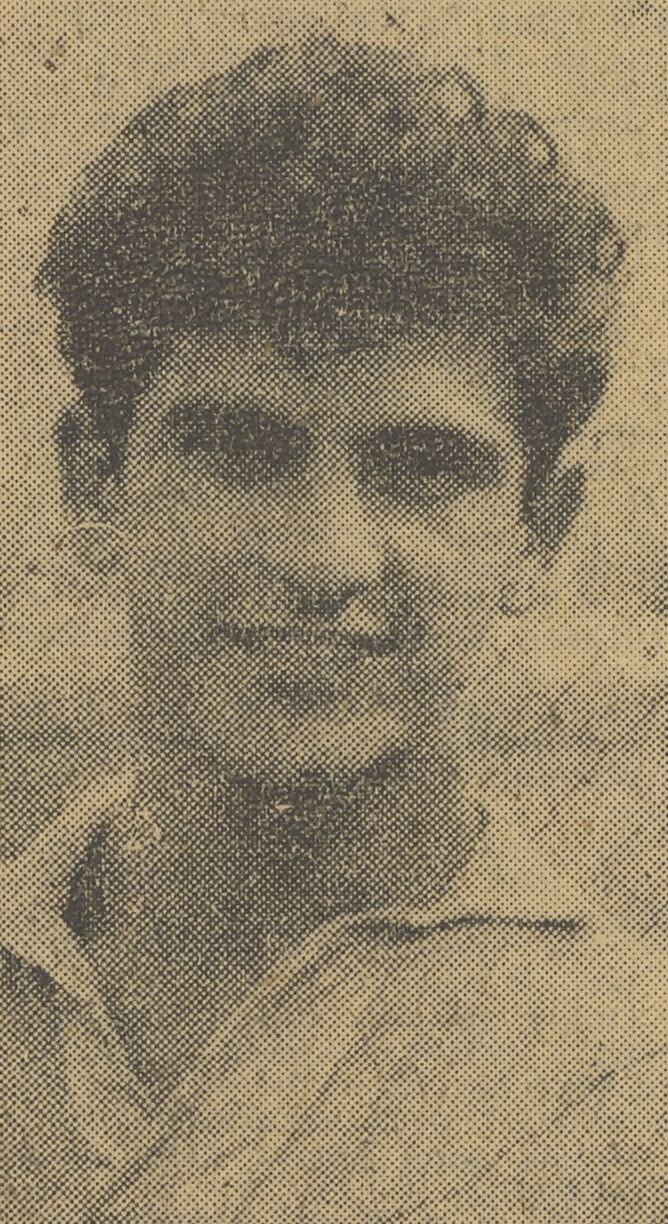
- Born: 19 October 1932 (age 94) Cessenon-sur-Orb, France
- Height: 5 ft 10 in (178 cm)
- Weight: 167 lb (76 kg)

Rugby union career
- Position: Three–quarter
International career
Years	Team	Apps	(Points)
1952–60	France	15	(12)

Lucien Rogé (born 19 October 1932) is a French former international rugby union player.

== Biography ==
Rogé was born in Cessenon-sur-Orb and played for AS Béziers, debuting at age 17.

A three–quarter, Rogé was mainly utilised on a wing and was capped 15 times for France from 1952 to 1960. He took part in three successful Five Nations campaigns and was a member of France 1958 tour of South Africa.

Rogé, a dentist by profession, won a French Championship with AS Béziers in 1961.

== See also ==
- List of France national rugby union players
