= Simon Labouyrie =

- Born: Simon Labouyrie; 15 October 1991 (age 35)
- Height: 1.80 m (5 ft 11 in)
- Weight: 106 kg (16 st 10 lb)

Rugby union career
- Position: Hooker
Amateur team(s)
Years	Team	Apps	(Points)
- Carqueiranne Hyeres Crau
- Correct as of 30 November 2019
Senior career
Years	Team	Apps	(Points)
2014–2018	Bayonne	69	(30)
2018	Dax	7	(0)
2018–2019	Bourg-en-Bresse	9	(10)
2019–	Carqueiranne Hyeres Crau	18	(10)
- Correct as of 30 November 2019

Simon Labouyrie (born 15 October 1991) is a French professional rugby union player. He plays at hooker for Bayonne.
