= Michel Lasserre =

France international rugby union player

- Born: 21 January 1940 (age 86) Le Causé, France
- Height: 6 ft 1 in (185 cm)
- Weight: 219 lb (99 kg)

Rugby union career
- Position: Prop
International career
Years	Team	Apps	(Points)
1967–71	France	15	(0)

Michel Lasserre (born 21 January 1940) is a French former international rugby union player.

Lasserre hailed from Le Causé in Tarn-et-Garonne and was known by the nickname "L'Obus" (the Shell).

A forward, Lasserre spent most of his career with SU Agen, winning back to back championships in 1965 and 1966. He often featured in the second row for SU Agen, alongside Jacques Fort, but was utilised by France mainly as a prop. From 1967 to 1971, Lasserre gained a total of 15 internationals caps. He debuted on France's 1967 tour of South Africa and was a member of their 1968 Five Nations grand slam–winning team.

== See also ==
- List of France national rugby union players
