= Jean-Pierre Razat =

France international rugby union player (1940–2025)

- Born: 15 October 1940 Fumel, Vichy France
- Died: 2 February 2025 (aged 84)
- Height: 1.75 m (5 ft 9 in)

Rugby union career
- Position(s): Full-back; Fly-half
Senior career
Years	Team	Apps	(Points)
?–?	Agen	?	(?)
International career
Years	Team	Apps	(Points)
1962–1963	France	4	(0)

Jean-Pierre Razat (15 October 1940 – 2 February 2025) was a French rugby union player who played as a full-back and fly-half.

Nicknamed Goupil, Razat was a three-time winner of the French Rugby Union Championship with SU Agen Lot-et-Garonne. He also won the Challenge Yves du Manoir on Agen's squad. On 11 November 1962, he played his first of four games with the French national game, a 6–6 draw with Romania.

Razat died on 2 February 2025, at the age of 84.
