= US Dax =

French rugby union club, based in Dax

(France) US Dax
- Full name: Union Sportive Dax Rugby Landes
- Founded: 1904; 122 years ago
- Location: Dax, France
- Ground: Stade Maurice Boyau (Capacity: 7,262)
- President: Philippe Jacquemain
- Coach(es): ean-Frédéric Dubois; Hervé Durquety; Marc Dal Maso
- League: Pro D2
- 2024–25: 11th
| Team kit | 2nd kit |

Official website
- usdrugby-landes.fr

Union Sportive Dax Rugby Landes, also known as US Dax, is a French rugby union club currently playing in Pro D2, the second level of the French league system.

They were founded in 1904. They play at Stade Maurice Boyau (capacity 7,262). They wear red and white. They are based in Dax in the Landes department of Nouvelle-Aquitaine.

== Honours ==
- French championship Top 14
  - Runners-up (5): 1956, 1961, 1963, 1966, 1973
- Challenge Yves du Manoir
  - Champions (5): 1957, 1959, 1969, 1971, 1982
  - Runners-up (2): 1968, 1988

== Finals results ==
=== French championship ===
| Date | Winners | Score | Runners-up | Venue | Spectators |
|---|---|---|---|---|---|
| 3 June 1956 | FC Lourdes | 20-0 | US Dax | Stadium Municipal, Toulouse | 38,426 |
| 28 May 1961 | AS Béziers | 6-3 | US Dax | Stade de Gerland, Lyon | 35,000 |
| 2 June 1963 | Stade Montois | 9-6 | US Dax | Parc Lescure, Bordeaux | 39,000 |
| 22 May 1966 | SU Agen | 9-8 | US Dax | Stadium Municipal, Toulouse | 28,803 |
| 20 May 1973 | Stadoceste Tarbais | 18-12 | US Dax | Stadium Municipal, Toulouse | 26,952 |

=== Challenge Yves du Manoir ===
| Date | Winners | Score | Runners-up |
|---|---|---|---|
| 1957 | US Dax | 6-6 | AS Montferrand |
| 1959 | US Dax | 12-8 | Section Paloise |
| 1968 | RC Narbonne | 14-6 | US Dax |
| 1969 | US Dax | 24-12 | FC Grenoble |
| 1971 | US Dax | 18-8 | Stade Toulousain |
| 1982 | US Dax | 22-19 | RC Narbonne |
| 1988 | Stade Toulousain | 15-13 | US Dax |

== Current standings ==
2025–26 Pro D2 Table
| Pos | Team | Pld | W | D | L | PF | PA | PD | TB | LB | Pts | Qualification |
|---|---|---|---|---|---|---|---|---|---|---|---|---|
| 1 | Vannes | 30 | 24 | 1 | 5 | 1092 | 543 | +549 | 15 | 3 | 116 | Semi-final promotion playoff place |
| 2 | Colomiers | 30 | 21 | 0 | 9 | 847 | 522 | +325 | 8 | 3 | 95 | Semi-final promotion playoff place |
| 3 | Provence | 30 | 19 | 0 | 11 | 905 | 726 | +179 | 9 | 7 | 92 | Quarter-final promotion playoff place |
| 4 | Oyonnax | 30 | 17 | 0 | 13 | 953 | 659 | +294 | 9 | 9 | 86 | Quarter-final promotion playoff place |
| 5 | Valence Romans | 30 | 19 | 0 | 11 | 803 | 760 | +43 | 4 | 4 | 84 | Quarter-final promotion playoff place |
| 6 | Brive | 30 | 17 | 1 | 12 | 906 | 642 | +264 | 11 | 2 | 83 | Quarter-final promotion playoff place |
| 7 | Agen | 30 | 15 | 0 | 15 | 796 | 750 | +46 | 9 | 3 | 72 | |
| 8 | Grenoble | 30 | 14 | 0 | 16 | 739 | 829 | −90 | 2 | 4 | 62 | |
| 9 | Soyaux Angoulême | 30 | 13 | 0 | 17 | 576 | 770 | −194 | 2 | 5 | 59 | |
| 10 | Biarritz | 30 | 12 | 1 | 17 | 762 | 879 | −117 | 8 | 1 | 54 | |
| 11 | Dax | 30 | 14 | 0 | 16 | 706 | 742 | −36 | 6 | 7 | 55 | |
| 12 | Béziers | 30 | 12 | 0 | 18 | 657 | 804 | −147 | 4 | 4 | 56 | |
| 13 | Nevers | 30 | 11 | 1 | 18 | 760 | 1024 | −264 | 4 | 3 | 53 | |
| 14 | Aurillac | 30 | 11 | 0 | 19 | 718 | 908 | −190 | 2 | 7 | 53 | |
| 15 | Mont-de-Marsan | 30 | 11 | 1 | 18 | 701 | 950 | −249 | 3 | 2 | 51 | Relegation play-off |
| 16 | Carcassonne | 30 | 7 | 1 | 22 | 572 | 985 | −413 | 0 | 5 | 35 | Relegation to Nationale |

Updated to match(es) played on 17 May 2026. Source:

== Current squad ==
The squad for the 2025–26 season is:

Dax 2025–26 Pro D2 squad
| **Props**: (France) Dino Casadeï; (Romania) **Thomas Crețu**; (France) Thibaud Dréan; (Portugal) **Diogo Hasse Ferreira**; (Samoa) **Nephi Leatigaga**; (Tonga) **David Lolohea**; **Hookers**: (France) Louis Barrère; (France) Iban Hiriart-Urruty; (France) Paul Laperne; **Locks**: (Spain) **Brice Ferrer**; (France) Étienne Loiret; (France) Amine Maalla; (France) Alexandre Manukula; (England) Charlie Matthews; (France) Jean-Baptiste Singer | **Back row**: (France) Arnaud Aletti; (France) Paul Ausset; (France) Jean-Baptiste Barrère; (Spain) **Lucas Guillaume**; (Samoa) **Genesis Mamea Lemalu**; (Fiji) Ratu Nacika; (New Zealand) Sam Wadley; **Scrum-halves**: (France) Paul Ravier; (France) Sylvère Reteau; **Fly-halves**: (France) Hugo Cerisier; (France) Romuald Séguy | **Centres**: (France) Bastien Daguerre; (France) Hugo Fourquet; (France) Benjamin Puntous; (Fiji) **Jale Vatubua**; **Wings**: (France) Naïm Ben Alla; (France) Théo Gatelier; (Fiji) Jope Naseara; (Germany) **Maxime Oltmann**; **Fullbacks**: (France) Théo Duprat |
**(c)** denotes the team captain. (vc) denotes vice-captain. **Bold** denotes internationally capped players.^{ST} denotes a short-term signing. Source:

Dax 2025–26 Espoirs squad
| **Props**: (France) Xabi Curutchet; (France) Mateo Guerin; (France) Raphaël Laboille; (France) Killian Larrart; (France) Mathys Vigeon; **Hookers**: (France) Enzo Fernandes; (France) Patxi Gony; **Locks**: (France) Taino Andrebe; (France) Evan Chatelain | **Back row**: (France) Logan Dubois; (France) Malo Hannoyer; (France) Mateo Lacroix; (France) Julien Laveran; **Scrum-halves**: (France) Tom Dourthie; (France) Illan Etchecoper; **Fly-halves**: (France) Martin Bonhoure; (France) Mathys Pardie; (France) Paul Rebeyrotte | **Centres**: (France) Julien Aguer; (France) Ronan Fayrau; (France) Jules Lartigau; (Fiji) Jekope Sapou; **Wings**: (France) Louis Couget; (France) Diego Miranda; (Fiji) Duacake Vulainabuwaha; **Fullbacks** |
**(c)** denotes the team captain. (vc) denotes vice-captain. **Bold** denotes internationally capped players.^{ST} denotes a short-term signing. Source:

== Notable former players ==
- (Argentina) Horacio Agulla
- (Argentina) Federico Martín Aramburú
- (Argentina) Lucas Borges
- (Argentina) Roberto Grau
- (Argentina) Ignacio Mieres
- (Argentina) Juan Pablo Socino
- (Argentina) Nicolás Vergallo
- (Australia) Fotunuupule Auelua
- (Australia) Matt Henjak
- (Australia) Morgan Turinui
- (Canada) Al Charron
- (England) Joseph Mbu
- (Fiji) Fero Lasagavibau
- (Fiji) Neumi Nanuku
- (Fiji) Saula Radidi
- (Fiji) Nemia Soqeta
- (France) Paul Albaladejo
- (France) Pierre Albaladejo
- (France) Raymond Albaladejo
- (France) Benoît August
- (France) Jean-Louis Azarete
- (France) David Banquet
- (France) Jean-Pierre Bastiat
- (France) Jean-Louis Bérot
- (France) Maurice Biraben
- (France) Anthony Bouthier
- (France) Maurice Boyau
- (France) Julien Brugnaut
- (France) Georges Capdepuy
- (France) Philippe Carbonneau
- (France) Stéphane Castaignède
- (France) Cyril Cazeaux
- (France) Arthur Chollon
- (France) René Crabos
- (France) Claude Darbos
- (France) Pierre Darbos
- (France) Jean Desclaux
- (France) Claude Dourthe
- (France) Richard Dourthe
- (France) Mathieu Dourthe
- (France) Claude Dufau
- (France) Gérard Dufau
- (France) Sébastien Fauqué
- (France) Philippe Gimbert
- (France) Pascal Giordani
- (France) Abel Guichemerre
- (France) Arnaud Héguy
- (France) Jacques Ibañez
- (France) Raphaël Ibañez
- (France) Olivier Klemenczak
- (France) Simon Labouyrie
- (France) Charles Lacazedieu
- (France) Julien Laharrague
- (France) Nicolas Laharrague
- (France) Thierry Lacroix
- (France) Paul Lasaosa
- (France) Jean-Claude Lasserre
- (France) Bernard Lavigne
- (France) Jean-Patrick Lescarboura
- (France) Matthieu Lièvremont
- (France) Thomas Lièvremont
- (France) Ludovic Loustau
- (France) Jean-Pierre Lux
- (France) Olivier Magne
- (France) Christophe Milhères
- (France) Ugo Mola
- (France) Benjamin Noirot
- (France) Fabien Pelous
- (France) Maxime Petitjean
- (France) Julien Peyrelongue
- (France) Toki Pilioko
- (France) Laurent Rodriguez
- (France) Olivier Roumat
- (France) Marc Sallefranque
- (France) Julien Saubade
- (France) Nicolas Spanghero
- (Georgia (country)) Irakli Giorgadze
- (Georgia (country)) Tariel Ratianidze
- (Germany) Clemens von Grumbkow
- (Ireland) Aidan McCullen
- (Italy) David Bortolussi
- (Italy) Laurent Travini
- (Namibia) P. J. van Lill
- (New Zealand) Charlie Hore
- (Romania) Petru Bălan
- (Romania) Gabriel Brezoianu
- (Romania) Iulian Dumitraș
- (Samoa) Kas Lealamanua
- (Samoa) Justin Purdie
- (Samoa) Kane Thompson
- (Samoa) Gavin Williams
- (Scotland) Craig Smith
- (South Africa) Jannie Bornman
- (South Africa) Jacques-Louis Potgieter
- (Tonga) Paea Faʻanunu
- (Tonga) Mafileo Kefu
- (Tonga) Joe Tuineau
- (Uruguay) Mario Sagario
- (Wales) Liam Davies

== See also ==
- List of rugby union clubs in France
- Rugby union in France
