= Francesco Zani =

Italian rugby union player (1938–2026)

- Born: 24 October 1938 Iseo, Italy
- Died: 5 April 2026 (aged 87)

Rugby union career
- Position: Lock
Senior career
Years	Team	Apps	(Points)
?–1961	Fiamme Oro Rugby	?	(?)
1961–1974	SU Agen	?	(?)
International career
Years	Team	Apps	(Points)
1960–1966	Italy	11	(0)

Francesco "Franco" Zani (24 October 1938 – 5 April 2026) was an Italian rugby union player who played as a lock.

Zani spent time with Fiamme Oro Rugby before playing for SU Agen from 1961 to 1974, notably winning the 1964–65 French Rugby Union Championship. He also suited up in 11 matches for the Italian national team from 1960 to 1966.

Zani died on 5 April 2026, at the age of 87.
