= Michel Sitjar =

France international rugby union and league player (1942-2019)

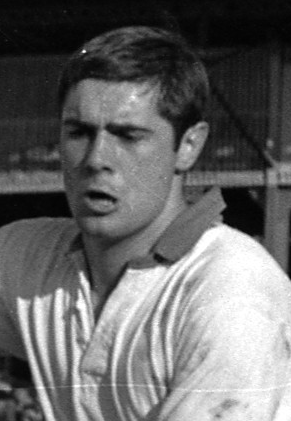
- Sitjar in 1965
- Born: 13 September 1942 Castelsagrat, Tarn-et-Garonne, Occitania, France
- Died: 10 June 2019 (aged 76) Lamagistère, France
- Height: 179 cm (5 ft 10 in)
- Weight: 92 kg (203 lb; 14 st 7 lb)
- Occupation: Rugby player

Rugby union career
- Position: Flanker
Youth career
- Avenir Valencien
Senior career
Years	Team	Apps	(Points)
1961–1970	Sporting Union Agenais		
- Correct as of 20 June 2019
International career
Years	Team	Apps	(Points)
1964–1967	France	13	(3)
- Correct as of 20 June 2019
- Rugby league career

Playing information
Club
Years	Team	Pld	T	G	FG	P
1970–1971	XIII Catalan

Michel Sitjar (13 September 1942 – 10 June 2019) was an international rugby union and rugby league player for France and played club rugby for Agen. He also tried rugby league for a year in XIII Catalan after brutally stopping his career at 28. Sitjar played as a flanker and won three Brennus Shields with the Sporting Union Agenais (1962, 1965 and 1966).

In 2008 he published his first collection of poems (Rugby & Poésie), followed by the second one Rugby & Poésie, deuxième mi-temps two years later.

Sitjar committed suicide by gunshot at his home in Lamagistère on June 10, 2019.
