= Pierre Lacroix (rugby union) =

French rugby union player (1935–2019)

- Born: 23 January 1935 Houeillès, France
- Died: 28 March 2019 (aged 84) Colayrac-Saint-Cirq, France
- Height: 5 ft 4 in (1.63 m)
- Weight: 163 lb (74 kg)

Rugby union career
- Position: Scrum-half
Amateur team(s)
Years	Team	Apps	(Points)
1955-1959	Stade Montois		
1959-1971	SU Agen		
International career
Years	Team	Apps	(Points)
1958–1963	France	27	(12)
- Correct as of 3 April 2019

Pierre Lacroix (23 January 1935 – 28 March 2019) was a French rugby union player who played at scrum-half for the France national team.

He played most of his player career for SU Agen, from 1959/60 to 1970/71. He won three times the French Championship, in 1961/62, 1964/65 and 1965/66.

On 9 March 1958, Lacroix made his debut for France in a 19–0 victory over Australia during their 1957–58 tour of Britain, Ireland and France. Lacroix scored his first try for France on 26 March 1960 in a 16–8 victory over Wales during the 1960 Five Nations Championship. Lacroix made his final appearance for France on 23 March 1963 in a 5–3 victory over Wales during the 1963 Five Nations Championship. Over the course of his international career, Lacroix earned 27 caps for France and scored 4 tries (for a total of 12 points). In his final nine appearances for France, Lacroix served as the team's captain.
