= SU Agen Lot-et-Garonne =

French rugby union club

(France) SU Agen
- Full name: Sporting Union Agen Lot-et-Garonne
- Founded: 1908; 118 years ago
- Location: Agen, France
- Ground: Stade Armandie (Capacity: 14,400)
- President: Alain Tingaud
- Coach(es): Christophe Laussucq; Rémi Vaquin
- Captain: Antoine Erbani
- League: Pro D2
- 2024–25: 14th
| 1st kit | 2nd kit |

Official website
- www.agen-rugby.com

Sporting Union Agen Lot-et-Garonne (French pronunciation: [spɔʁtɪŋ ynjɔ̃ aʒɛ̃ lɔt e ɡaʁɔn]), commonly referred to as SU Agen, Agen (French pronunciation: [aʒɛ̃]) or SUALG, is a French professional rugby union club based in Agen, Lot-et-Garonne that competes in the Pro D2, France's second division of rugby.

Founded in 1908, Agen is one of the historic clubs in French rugby, having won the French Championship eight times. Its home ground is the Stade Armandie and traditional club colours are navy blue and white.

The club is renowned for its youth system and its academy structure.

== History ==
The club was established in 1900. They made their first championship final in the 1930 season, where they met US Quillan, and defeated them 4 points to nil in Bordeaux, thus capturing their first championship title. The club experienced some success in the following years in the Challenge Yves du Manoir competition as well; winning it in the 1932 season and being runners-up to Lyon OU in the 1933 season.

Agen would have another successful run in the 1940s, beginning with the 1943 season when they defeated Stade Bordelais 11 to 4 to win the Coupe de France. That season they also made it to the championship final; though they were defeated by Aviron Bayonnais 3 points to nil at Parc des Princes in Paris.

In 1945 they again won the title of the French championship, defeating FC Lourdes 7 points to 3 in the final in Paris. The championship was one of their two titles that season, as Agen also won the Coupe de France, defeating Montferrand 14 to 13. Agen featured in one more championship that decade, losing to Toulouse 10 points to 3.

Agen were relatively quiet during the 1950s, though they again rose to prominence during the 1960s. In 1962 they again became of the champions of France after defeating Béziers 14 points to 11 in the season final. The following season they won the Challenge Yves du Manoir, defeating Brive 11 points to nil in the final. Agen became the French champions on two more occasions during the 1960s, defeating Brive in 1965 and then Dax in 1966.

The club had another successful run during the 1970s, starting with an unsuccessful Challenge Yves du Manoir final, losing to Toulon 25 points to 22. They were unsuccessful again in 1975 in the Challenge Yves du Manoir, losing to Béziers 16 points to 12 in the final. However they would then meet Béziers in the championship final of the 1976 season, and defeat them 13 to 10 to win their first championship since 1966.

Agen went through period of success in the 1980s after winning the championship in 1982, defeating Aviron Bayonnais 18 points to 9 in the final. The following season they won the Challenge Yves du Manoir as well after defeating Toulon 29 points to 7. In 1984 they again contested the championship final, though they eventually lost it to Béziers. They unsuccessfully contested it again in 1986, losing to Toulouse 16 to 6. They were also runners-up in the 1987 Challenge Yves du Manoir, losing to Grenoble. However, in 1988 they again won the championship, defeating Stadoceste Tarbais 9 to 3 in the final.

They contested the final again in the 1990 season, losing to Racing Club de France 22 points to 12. In 1992 they won the Challenge Yves du Manoir, defeating RC Narbonne 23 to 18.

=== Professional era ===
In 1998 they played in their first European cup final, the European Challenge Cup, losing to fellow French team US Colomiers 43 to 5 in the final. On June 8, 2002, they lost to Biarritz Olympique in the championship final.

In recent years, one of their biggest stars has been Fijian winger Rupeni Caucaunibuca. He led the team in tries in 2005 and 2006, and led Pro D2 in that category during Agen's most recent promotion season in 2010. However, he would be dismissed from the team in September 2010 after failing to report to the team for preseason workouts (several weeks later, he would reemerge at Toulouse).

== Honours ==
- French championship Top 14
  - Champions (8): 1930, 1945, 1962, 1965, 1966, 1976, 1982, 1988
  - Runners-up (6): 1943, 1947, 1984, 1986, 1990, 2002
- European Rugby Challenge Cup
  - Runners-up (1): 1998
- Challenge Yves du Manoir
  - Champions (4): 1932, 1963, 1983, 1992
  - Runners-up (4): 1933, 1970, 1975, 1987
- French Cup
  - Champions (2): 1943, 1945
- Pro D2
  - Champions: 2010
  - Promotion playoff winners: 2015, 2017

== Finals results ==
=== French championship ===
| Date | Winners | Score | Runners-up | Venue | Spectators |
|---|---|---|---|---|---|
| 18 May 1930 | SU Agen | 4-0 (aet) | US Quillan | Parc Lescure, Bordeaux | 28.000 |
| 21 March 1943 | Aviron Bayonnais | 3-0 | SU Agen | Parc des Princes, Paris | 28.000 |
| 7 April 1945 | SU Agen | 7-3 | FC Lourdes | Parc des Princes, Paris | 30.000 |
| 13 April 1947 | Stade Toulousain | 10-3 | SU Agen | Stade des Ponts Jumeaux, Toulouse | 25.000 |
| 27 May 1962 | SU Agen | 14-11 | AS Béziers | Stadium Municipal, Toulouse | 37.705 |
| 23 May 1965 | SU Agen | 15-8 | CA Brive | Stade de Gerland, Lyon | 28.758 |
| 22 May 1966 | SU Agen | 9-8 | US Dax | Stadium Municipal, Toulouse | 28.803 |
| 23 May 1976 | SU Agen | 13-10 (aet) | AS Béziers | Parc des Princes, Paris | 40.300 |
| 29 May 1982 | SU Agen | 18-9 | Aviron Bayonnais | Parc des Princes, Paris | 41.165 |
| 26 May 1984 | AS Béziers | 21-21 (aet) | SU Agen | Parc des Princes, Paris | 44.076 |
| 24 May 1986 | Stade Toulousain | 16-6 | SU Agen | Parc des Princes, Paris | 45.145 |
| 28 May 1988 | SU Agen | 9-3 | Stadoceste Tarbais | Parc des Princes, Paris | 48.000 |
| 26 May 1990 | Racing Club de France | 22-12 (aet) | SU Agen | Parc des Princes, Paris | 45.069 |
| 8 June 2002 | Biarritz Olympique | 25-22 (aet) | SU Agen | Stade de France, Saint-Denis | 78.457 |

=== European Rugby Challenge Cup ===
| Date | Winners | Score | Runners-up | Venue | Spectators |
|---|---|---|---|---|---|
| 2 February 1998 | (France) US Colomiers | 43-5 | (France) SU Agen | Stade des Sept Deniers, Toulouse | 12.500 |

=== Challenge Yves du Manoir ===
| Date | Winners | Score | Runners-up |
|---|---|---|---|
| 1932 | SU Agen | round robin | Lyon OU |
| 1933 | Lyon OU | round robin | SU Agen |
| 1963 | SU Agen | 11-0 | CA Brive |
| 1970 | RC Toulon | 25-22 | SU Agen |
| 1975 | AS Béziers | 16-12 | SU Agen |
| 1983 | SU Agen | 29-7 | RC Toulon |
| 1987 | FC Grenoble | 26-7 | SU Agen |
| 1992 | SU Agen | 23-18 | RC Narbonne |

=== French Cup ===
| Date | Winners | Score | Runners-up |
|---|---|---|---|
| 1943 | SU Agen | 11-4 | Stade Bordelais |
| 1945 | SU Agen | 14-13 | AS Montferrand |

=== Pro D2 promotion playoffs ===
| Date | Winner | Runner-up | Score | Venue | Attendance |
|---|---|---|---|---|---|
| 2014 | La Rochelle | SU Agen | 31–22 | Stade Chaban-Delmas, Bordeaux | 33,262 |
| 2015 | SU Agen | Stade Montois | 16–15 | Stade Ernest-Wallon, Toulouse | |
| 2017 | SU Agen | US Montauban | 41-20 | Stade Chaban-Delmas, Bordeaux | |

== Current standings ==
2025–26 Pro D2 Table
| Pos | Team | Pld | W | D | L | PF | PA | PD | TB | LB | Pts | Qualification |
|---|---|---|---|---|---|---|---|---|---|---|---|---|
| 1 | Vannes | 30 | 24 | 1 | 5 | 1092 | 543 | +549 | 15 | 3 | 116 | Semi-final promotion playoff place |
| 2 | Colomiers | 30 | 21 | 0 | 9 | 847 | 522 | +325 | 8 | 3 | 95 | Semi-final promotion playoff place |
| 3 | Provence | 30 | 19 | 0 | 11 | 905 | 726 | +179 | 9 | 7 | 92 | Quarter-final promotion playoff place |
| 4 | Oyonnax | 30 | 17 | 0 | 13 | 953 | 659 | +294 | 9 | 9 | 86 | Quarter-final promotion playoff place |
| 5 | Valence Romans | 30 | 19 | 0 | 11 | 803 | 760 | +43 | 4 | 4 | 84 | Quarter-final promotion playoff place |
| 6 | Brive | 30 | 17 | 1 | 12 | 906 | 642 | +264 | 11 | 2 | 83 | Quarter-final promotion playoff place |
| 7 | Agen | 30 | 15 | 0 | 15 | 796 | 750 | +46 | 9 | 3 | 72 | |
| 8 | Grenoble | 30 | 14 | 0 | 16 | 739 | 829 | −90 | 2 | 4 | 62 | |
| 9 | Soyaux Angoulême | 30 | 13 | 0 | 17 | 576 | 770 | −194 | 2 | 5 | 59 | |
| 10 | Biarritz | 30 | 12 | 1 | 17 | 762 | 879 | −117 | 8 | 1 | 54 | |
| 11 | Dax | 30 | 14 | 0 | 16 | 706 | 742 | −36 | 6 | 7 | 55 | |
| 12 | Béziers | 30 | 12 | 0 | 18 | 657 | 804 | −147 | 4 | 4 | 56 | |
| 13 | Nevers | 30 | 11 | 1 | 18 | 760 | 1024 | −264 | 4 | 3 | 53 | |
| 14 | Aurillac | 30 | 11 | 0 | 19 | 718 | 908 | −190 | 2 | 7 | 53 | |
| 15 | Mont-de-Marsan | 30 | 11 | 1 | 18 | 701 | 950 | −249 | 3 | 2 | 51 | Relegation play-off |
| 16 | Carcassonne | 30 | 7 | 1 | 22 | 572 | 985 | −413 | 0 | 5 | 35 | Relegation to Nationale |

Updated to match(es) played on 17 May 2026. Source:

== Current squad ==
The Agen squad for the 2025–26 season is:

Agen 2025–26 Pro D2 squad
| **Props**: (France) Alex Burin; (England) Beau Farrance; (France) Floren Guion; (France) Hans Lombard-Buret; (Georgia (country)) Lasha Macharashvili; (Georgia (country)) Mamuka Mstoiani; (Georgia (country)) Omar Odishvili; (France) Lucas Tabarot; **Hookers**: (France) Cyril Deligny; (France) Pierre Jouvin; (Argentina) **Santiago Socino**; **Locks**: (France) **William Demotte**; (Chile) **Javier Eissman**; (France) Mathieu de Giovanni; (Ireland) John Madigan; (France) Denis Marchois; (Canada) **Evan Olmstead** | **Back row**: (France) Matthieu Bonnet; (France) Arnaud Duputs; (France) Julien Debian; (Tonga) Tomaso Fineanganofo; (France) Valentin Gayraud; (Tonga) Taniela Matakaiongo; **Scrum-halves**: (France) Dorian Bellot; (France) Théo Idjellidaine; (England) **Jack Maunder**; **Fly-halves**: (France) Emile Dayral; (France) Franck Pourteau; (England) Craig Willis | **Centres**: (Australia) Ollie Cummins; (France) Clement Garrigues; (France) Peyo Muscarditz; (Fiji) Kolinio Ramoka; (New Zealand) Sio Tomkinson; **Wings**: (France) Louis Dupichot; (France) Iban Etcheverry; (Portugal) **Lucas Martins**; (France) Loris Tolot; **Fullbacks**: (France) Romain Darchen; (France) Mathias Jean |
**(c)** denotes the team captain. (vc) denotes vice-captain. **Bold** denotes internationally capped players.^{ST} denotes a short-term signing. Source:

Agen 2025–26 Espoirs squad
| **Props**: (France) Noah Deron; (France) Alexandre Everaert; (France) Julien Koteureu; (Georgia (country)) Archil Nozadze; (France) Clement Sartre; **Hookers**: (France) Bastien Beffara; (France) Bastien Darre; (Spain) Ivan Farrance; (France) Mae Riviere; **Locks**: (France) Noah Karram; (Germany) Ben Nehring; (Spain) Joan Ribera | **Back row**: (France) Mathys Alifanety; (France) Johan Bougrer; (France) Arthur Garloub; (France) Dany Lamataki; (South Africa) Dewan du Preez; (France) Cle Teunissen; (France) Enzo Serieyssol; (France) Colin Vidal; **Scrum-halves**: (France) Paul Laibat; (France) Paolo Laran; (France) Andrea Lucchini; (France) Gabin Pujo; **Fly-halves**: (France) Gautier Lavie; (France) Tom Meanateau | **Centres**: (France) Aymeric Bardy; (France) Silvio Bonavita; (France) Luigi Marina; (France) Kian Raymond; (France) Mylan Sosse; (Spain) Pelayo Serrano; **Wings**: (France) Remi Boulan; (France) Dylan Cazemajou; (France) Matteo Cotterill; (France) Arthur Deschaume; (France) Timeo Gayral; **Fullbacks**: (France) Evan Auritch; (France) Raphael Delom |
**(c)** denotes the team captain. (vc) denotes vice-captain. **Bold** denotes internationally capped players.^{ST} denotes a short-term signing. Source:

== Notable former players ==
- (Argentina) Belisario Agulla
- (Argentina) Eusebio Guiñazú
- (Argentina) Omar Hasan
- (Australia) Scott Daruda
- (Australia) Junior Pelesasa
- (Canada) Colin Yukes
- (Canada) Jason Marshall
- (Chile) Sergio Valdes
- (Ivory Coast) Silvère Tian
- (England) Andrew Springgay
- (Fiji) Rupeni Caucaunibuca
- (Fiji) Osea Kolinisau
- (Fiji) Taniela Rawaqa
- (Fiji) Saïmoni Vaka
- (France) Mathieu Barrau
- (France) Guy Basquet
- (France) Jean-Paul Baux
- (France) Christian Béguerie
- (France) Jean-Baptiste Bédère
- (France) Abdelatif Benazzi
- (France) René Bénésis
- (France) Philippe Benetton
- (France) Pierre Berbizier
- (France) Philippe Bérot
- (France) Paul Biémouret
- (France) Sébastien Bonetti
- (France) Jean Boubée
- (France) Guillaume Bouic
- (France) Christian Califano
- (France) Olivier Campan
- (France) Georges Carabignac
- (France) Jean Clavé
- (France) Valentin Courrent
- (France) David Couzinet
- (France) Jean-François Coux
- (France) Jean-Jacques Crenca
- (France) Marc Dal Maso
- (France) Jean-Louis Dehez
- (France) Christian Delage
- (France) Daniel Dubroca
- (France) Yves Duffaut
- (France) Brice Dulin
- (France) Jean-Louis Dupont
- (France) Sylvain Dupuy
- (France) Louis Echave
- (France) Pépito Elhorga
- (France) Dominique Erbani
- (France) Albert Ferrasse
- (France) Jacques Fort
- (France) François Gelez
- (France) Éric Gleyze
- (France) Jacques Gratton
- (France) Pierre Guilleux
- (France) Marius Guiral
- (France) Francis Haget
- (France) Cédric Heymans
- (France) Jean-Claude Hiquet
- (France) Thierry Labrousse
- (France) Bernard Lacombe
- (France) Pierre Lacroix
- (France) Luc Lafforgue
- (France) Christophe Lamaison
- (France) Grégoire Lascubé
- (France) Michel Lasserre
- (France) Serge Lassoujade
- (France) Marcel Laurent
- (France) Bernard Lavigne
- (France) Joël Llop
- (France) Matthieu Lièvremont
- (France) Gérard Magnac
- (France) Jean-Claude Malbet
- (France) Christophe Manas
- (France) Jean Matheu-Cambas
- (France) Jean-Michel Mazas
- (France) Patrick Mazzer
- (France) Jérôme Miquel
- (France) Jean Monribot
- (France) Christophe Porcu
- (France) Olivier Sarraméa
- (France) Philippe Sella
- (France) Michel Sitjar
- (France) Laurent Seigne
- (France) Jean-Louis Tolot
- (France) Bruno Tolot
- (France) Max Vigerie
- (France) Bernard Viviès
- (Georgia (country)) Irakli Machkhaneli
- (Georgia (country)) Giorgi Nemsadze
- (Georgia (country)) Anton Peikrishvili
- (Georgia (country)) Konstantin Mikautadze
- (Georgia (country)) Beka Sheklashvili
- (Ireland) Denis Fogarty
- (Italy) Santiago Dellapè
- (Italy) Alessio Galasso
- (Italy) Aaron Persico
- (Italy) Francesco Zani
- (Morocco) Djalil Narjissi
- (New Zealand) Ben Blair
- (New Zealand) Richard Fromont
- (New Zealand) Billy Fulton
- (New Zealand) Kees Meeuws
- (New Zealand) John Schwalger
- (Romania) Sorin Socol
- (South Africa) Adri Badenhorst
- (South Africa) Conrad Barnard
- (South Africa) Daniel (Neil) du Plessis
- (South Africa) Gert Muller
- (South Africa) Ross Skeate
- (South Africa) Conrad Stoltz
- (Russia) Kirill Kulemin
- (Samoa) Viliamu Afatia
- (French Polynesia) François Tardieu
- (Tonga) Lisiate Faʻaoso
- (Tonga) Uelini Fono
- (Tonga) Opeti Fonua
- (Tonga) Semisi Telefoni
- (United States) Inaki Basauri
- (United States) Kevin Swiryn
- (Wales) Luke Hamilton
- (Wales) Jamie Robinson

== See also ==
- List of rugby union clubs in France
- Rugby union in France
