= Bekker =

Bekker was first ever mentioned in the Torah in the form of the clan of the Bekkerrites. The addition of '-rite' to a surname indicates plural or a group of people. The original ancestor to South African Bekker's left Prussia in 1644 from Königsberg. A Bekker husband and wife were sent to their deaths from Trompsø, Norway to the concentration camps, WWII. Bekker is also Dutch and Low German occupational surname, bekker is a regional form of Dutch bakker ("baker"). Notable people with the surname include:

- Amore Bekker (born 1965), South African radio personality
- Andries Bekker (born 1983), South African rugby player
- Andriëtte Bekker (born 1958), South African statistician
- August Immanuel Bekker (1785–1871), German philologist and critic
- Balthasar Bekker (1634–1698), Dutch divine and author of philosophical and theological works
- Byron Bekker (born 1987), South African speedway rider
- Clarence Bekker (born 1968), Dutch Eurodance singer known as CB Milton
- Daniel Bekker (1932–2009), South African Springbox Heavyweight, Common Wealth Champion and Silver Olympic medalist.
- Elizabeth Bekker (1738–1804), Dutch writer known by her married name Betje Wolff
- Ernst Immanuel Bekker (1827–1918), German jurist and professor
- Hendrik Bekker (1661–1722), Dutch Governor of Ceylon
- Hennie Bekker (born 1934), Zambian-born musician and composer based in Canada
- Jaap Bekker Springbok Rugby Prop
- Jaco Bekker (born 1983), South African rugby player
- Jan Bekker Teerlink (1759–1832), Dutch plant/seed collector and winemaker, nephew of Betje Wolff
- Kees Bekker (1883–1964), Dutch footballer
- Kyle Bekker (born 1990), Canadian soccer player
- Marthinus Bekker (born 1980), Inventor and medical engineer
- Martiens Bekker (1930–1971) Springbok rugby player
- Martynas Švėgžda von Bekker (b. 1967), Lithuanian violinist
- Matthew F. Bekker, American environmental geographer and dendrochronologist
- Mieczysław G. Bekker (1905–1989), Polish engineer and scientist
- Myfanwy Bekker, South African artist and art teacher
- Oliver Bekker (born 1984), South African golf player
- Paul Bekker (1882–1937), German music critic

De Bekker

- Piet de Bekker (1921–2013), Dutch politician
- Wilhelmus de Bekker (1939–2026), Dutch-born Surinamese Roman Catholic bishop

Bekkers

- Dennis Bekkers (born 1980), Dutch taekwondo practitioner
- Wilhelmus Bekkers (1890–1957), Dutch tug of war competitor

== See also ==
- Bekker Port, a seaport in Estonia
- Bekker Nunataks, Antarctic peaks named after Mieczysław G. Bekker
- Bekker numbers, used to cite passages in the extant works of Aristotle, named after A. Immanuel Bekker
- Bekker v Jika, an important case in South African property law
- Daniëlle Bekkering (b. 1976), Dutch marathon speed skater
- Becker (disambiguation), German surname
- Bakker, Dutch surname
