= Empel en Meerwijk =

Coordinates: 51°44′08″N 5°18′18″E

- Former municipality
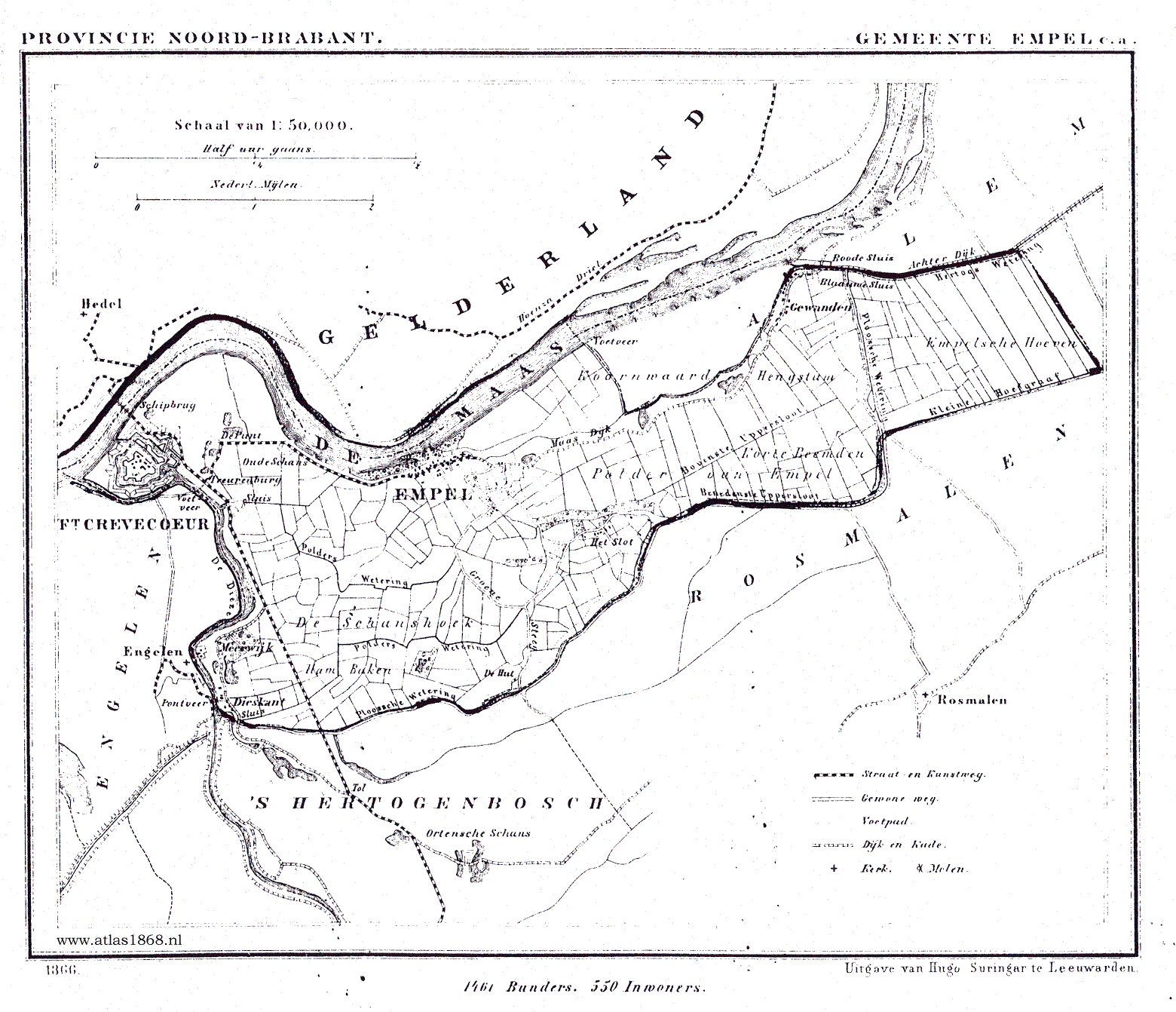
- Empel en Meerwijk in 1868

- Coat of arms
- Interactive map of Empel en Meerwijk
- Country: Netherlands
- Province: North Brabant
- Municipality: 's-Hertogenbosch

Empel en Meerwijk is a former municipality of the Dutch province of North Brabant.

== Geography ==
The municipality Empel en Meerwijk consisted of Dieskant, Empel, Oud-Empel, Gewande, and Meerwijk. It was situated south of the river Meuse and east of the river Dieze. For almost its entire existence, Empel referred to what is not called Oud-Empel, see the 1868 map. Since 1971 the former municipality is part of the municipality of 's-Hertogenbosch.

== History ==
The villages of Empel en Meerwijk were a fiefdom originally belonging to Crespin Abbey in northern France. The seat of the lords of Empel en Meerwijk was at the now demolished Empel en Meerwijk Castle.

During the Eighty Years' War, a fort called Fort Crèvecoeur was built on the western extremity of the lordship's territory. The terrain is still used for military exercises by the engineers of the Dutch Army.

In the second half of the nineteenth century Meerwijk Castle was built. This manor was built by the official lords of Empel en Meerwijk. These did not wield any feudal rights, but were so rich that they were indeed recognized as such. Meerwijk Castle would later become famous as an upper class brothel.
