= Piet de Bekker =

Dutch politician

Petrus Johannes Josephus Maria (Piet) de Bekker (17 April 1921, Empel – 5 January 2013, Breda) was a Dutch politician.

De Bekker started his career as a civil servant in his native municipality of Empel en Meerwijk. Subsequently he worked in 's-Hertogenbosch, The Hague, Zwolle, and Breda. From 1972 to 1985, he was mayor of the former municipality of Wanroij.

He was related to former KVP MP and former alderman of Empel en Meerwijk Leo de Bekker. His son, Felix, was an alderman for the Christian Democratic Appeal (CDA) in Etten-Leur.
