= Dolf Bekker =

South African rugby union player

- Full name: Rudolph Philippus Bekker
- Born: 15 December 1926 Dordrecht, South Africa
- Died: 22 June 2012 (aged 85)

Rugby union career
- Position: Wing
Provincial / State sides
Years	Team	Apps	(Points)
1950–56	Northern Transvaal		
International career
Years	Team	Apps	(Points)
1953	South Africa	2	(3)

Rudolph Philippus Bekker (15 December 1926 – 22 June 2012) was a South African international rugby union player.

Born in Dordrecht, Bekker was a member of a sporting family, with elder brother Jaap and younger brother Martiens both Springboks, while another brother Daniel found sporting success as an Olympic boxer.

Bekker, a winger, received a Springboks call up during a series against the visiting 1953 Wallabies, coming into the XV for the 3rd Test in Durban, where he scored a try in the first five-minutes of the match. He kept his place for the final Test in Port Elizabeth. A Northern Transvaal provincial player, Bekker was in the side that triumphed over Natal by one-point in the 1956 Currie Cup final, contributing a drop goal for his team.

== See also ==
- List of South Africa national rugby union players
