= Martiens Bekker =

South African international rugby union player

- Full name: Marthinus Johannes Bekker
- Born: 3 May 1930 Dordrecht, South Africa
- Died: 10 November 1971 (aged 41) Ermelo, South Africa

Rugby union career
- Position: Prop
Provincial / State sides
Years	Team	Apps	(Points)
- Northern Transvaal
International career
Years	Team	Apps	(Points)
1960	South Africa	1	(0)

Marthinus Johannes Bekker (3 May 1930 – 10 November 1971) was a South African international rugby union player.

Bekker hailed from the town of Dordrecht and was the youngest of three brothers to be capped for the Springboks. The brothers, Dolf and Jaap, both preceded him in the Springboks side, gaining their caps in the 1950s. He also had a younger brother, Daniel, who was a two–time Olympic medalist as a heavyweight boxer.

A Northern Transvaal representative, Bekker obtained his sole Springboks cap as a tight–head prop against Scotland at Boet Erasmus Stadium in 1960. He was one of 10 new Springboks caps.

Bekker died of a heart attack in 1971, aged 41.

== See also ==
- List of South Africa national rugby union players
