= Martynas Švėgžda von Bekker =

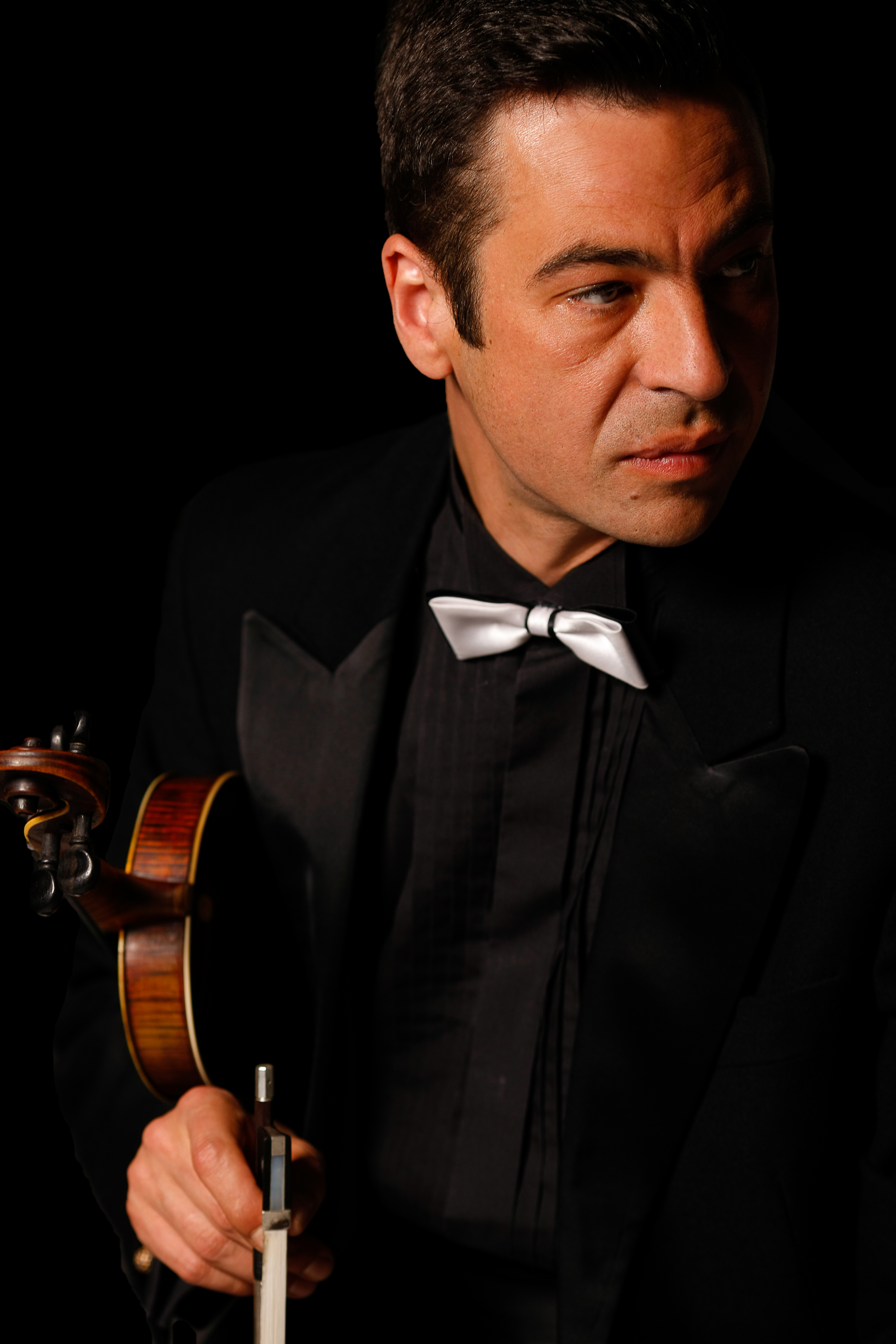
Martynas Švėgžda von Bekker

Martynas Švėgžda von Bekker (born 1967) is a Lithuanian violinist and musical educator.

== Life ==
Švėgžda von Bekker started taking violin classes at the age of five from his grandmother E. Strazdas-Bekerienė, student of Leopold von Auer, Jan Mařák, J. Feld and Jacques Thibaud. He gave his first recital at age seven and played his first concert with the “Vilnius Symphony Orchestra″ at age 11.

Švėgžda von Bekker attended the National M. K. Čiurlionis School of Art from 1973 to 1986 and studied at the Lithuanian Academy of Music and Theatre under Raimundas Katlius from 1986 to 1989.

In the following years, he also studied with different musicians, such as Eberhardt Feltz (violin, 1983), Igor Bezrodny (violin, 1985), Igor Oistrach (violin, 1988), Volker Banfield (chamber music, 1990), Ralf Gothóni (chamber music, 1990), Boris Garlitsky (violin, 1996) and Detlef Kraus (chamber music, 1992). He continued his studies in 1996 at the Hochschule für Musik und Theater Hamburg under the Russian violinist Mark Lubotsky, completing his graduate exam with distinction.

He lived in Paris from 1997 to 2003, performing as a solo violinist and chamber musician. He worked closely with Ugnė Karvelis, member of the UNESCO executive committee. From 2003 to 2017, Švėgžda von Bekkerwas a lecturer at the Lithuanian Academy of Music and Theatre. From 2009 to 2010 he lived in Boston as a Fulbright Scholar lecturer at the Boston University College of Fine Arts, School of Music. Since 2013, Švėgžda von Bekker has been living in Hamburg and teaching his own violin class. He started lecturing at the Johannes-Brahms-Konservatorium in 2016.

== Activities ==
Since 1990, Švėgžda von Bekker has given multiple solo and chamber music concerts in Scandinavia, Baltic countries, France, Germany, Portugal, Switzerland, Russia, United States and in Asia. From 1991 to 1997 he was part of the piano trio Coloris and won multiple first prizes in musical competitions.

He premiered the Alfred Schnittke Concert for Violin and Symphony Orchestra no. 1 with Hochschule für Musik und Theater Hamburg's Symphony Orchestra in 1993.

He also performed with the Berliner Symphoniker, the Georgian State Symphony Orchestra, the Lithuanian National Symphony Orchestra, the Lithuanian Chamber Orchestra, the Lithuanian St. Christopher Chamber Orchestra, the chamber orchestra Klaipėda, the Mikkeli chamber orchestra (Finland), the Hamburger Symphoniker as well as the Neue Philharmonie Hamburg and the Gloriamus philharmonia (Indonesia).

He entered his international performing career in Paris. He has performed alongside Hans-Dieter Baum, Igor Uryash, Nikolai Lugansky, Detlef Kraus, Yuri Mazurkevich, Duncan McTier, George Tchitchinadze and more.

His professional range and spectrum were broadened by concerts in the Laeiszhalle in Hamburg, Schauspielhaus in Berlin, at UNESCO in Paris and in the Tchaikovski Hall in Moscow. These experiences also inspired him to create his own compositions.

In 2001, he founded and lead the international and interdisciplinary "Alternative Classical Music Festivals" in Lithuania which took place up till 2011. In the course of those years many famous musicians, personalities and unusual musical, visual and other artistic projects were brought together. He also ran masterclasses.
