= Empel en Meerwijk Castle =

- Kasteel van Empel en Meerwijk
- Kasteeldreef, Empel, Netherlands
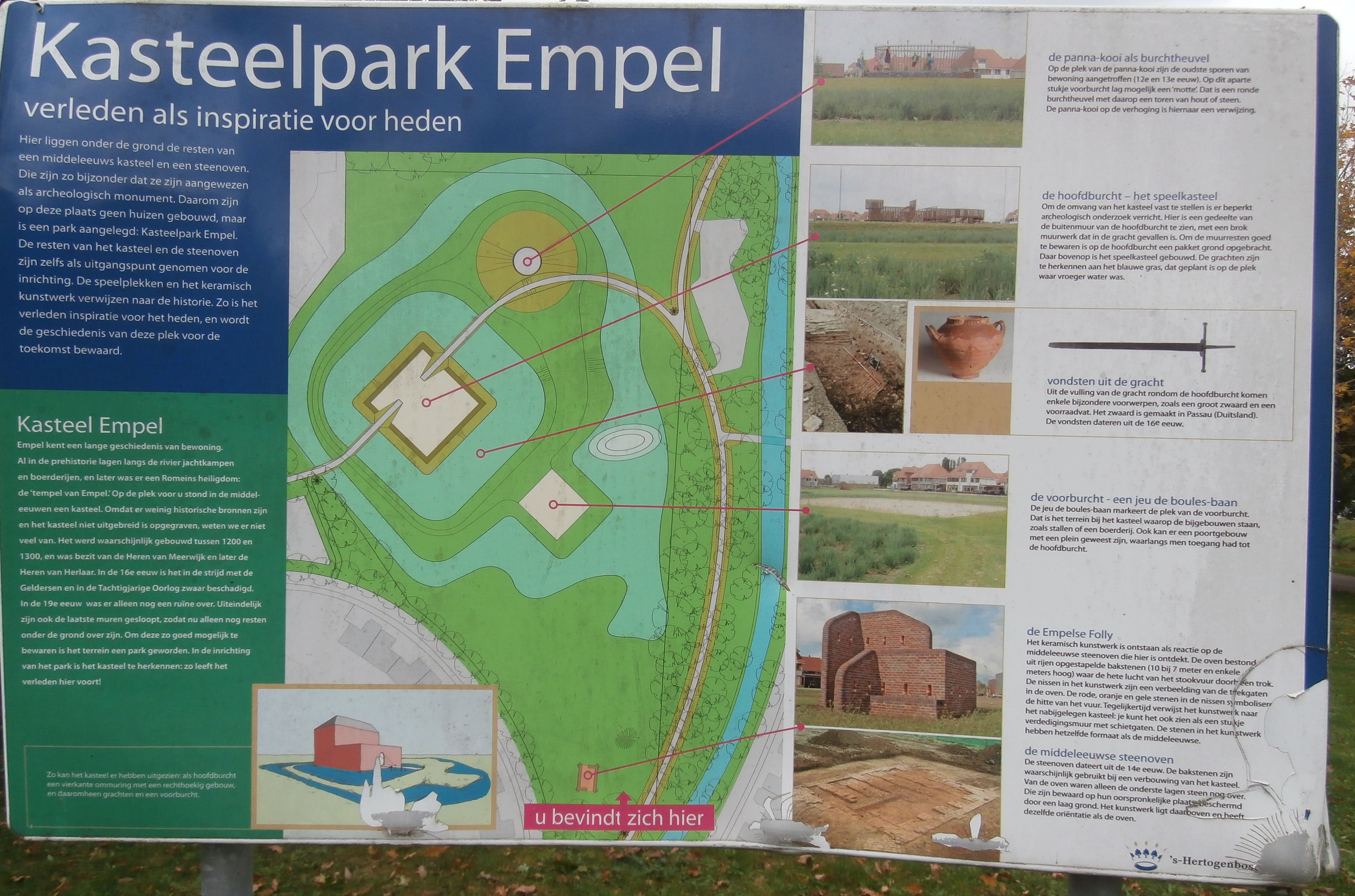
- Sign near the castle ruins.

Site information
- Type: Castle
- Open to the public: Yes, ruins
- Condition: foundations have been made visible

Location
- The Netherlands
- Location within Netherlands
- Coordinates: 51.730872°N 5.318331°E

Site history
- Built: 13th century

Empel en Meerwijk Castle was a medieval castle just north of 's-Hertogenbosch. All that's left is a terrain where the castle outlines have been visualized.

== Early history ==
=== Name of the castle ===
The castle was the original seat of the Lords of Empel and Meerwijk, henceforward Empel en Meerwijk. The current name of the castle is Empel en Meerwijk Castle, or Kasteel van Empel en Meerwijk, designating it as such. I.e. the name Empel en Meerwijk Castle is a construct, which was never used before the twentieth century. Before that, the castle was referred to as Kasteel Meerwijk or Slot Meerwijk, but that name was later taken by Meerwijk Castle, originally called Nieuw Meerwijk. In sources predating the nineteenth century the castle is often referred to as the House of Empel.

=== The first lords of Empel en Meerwijk ===
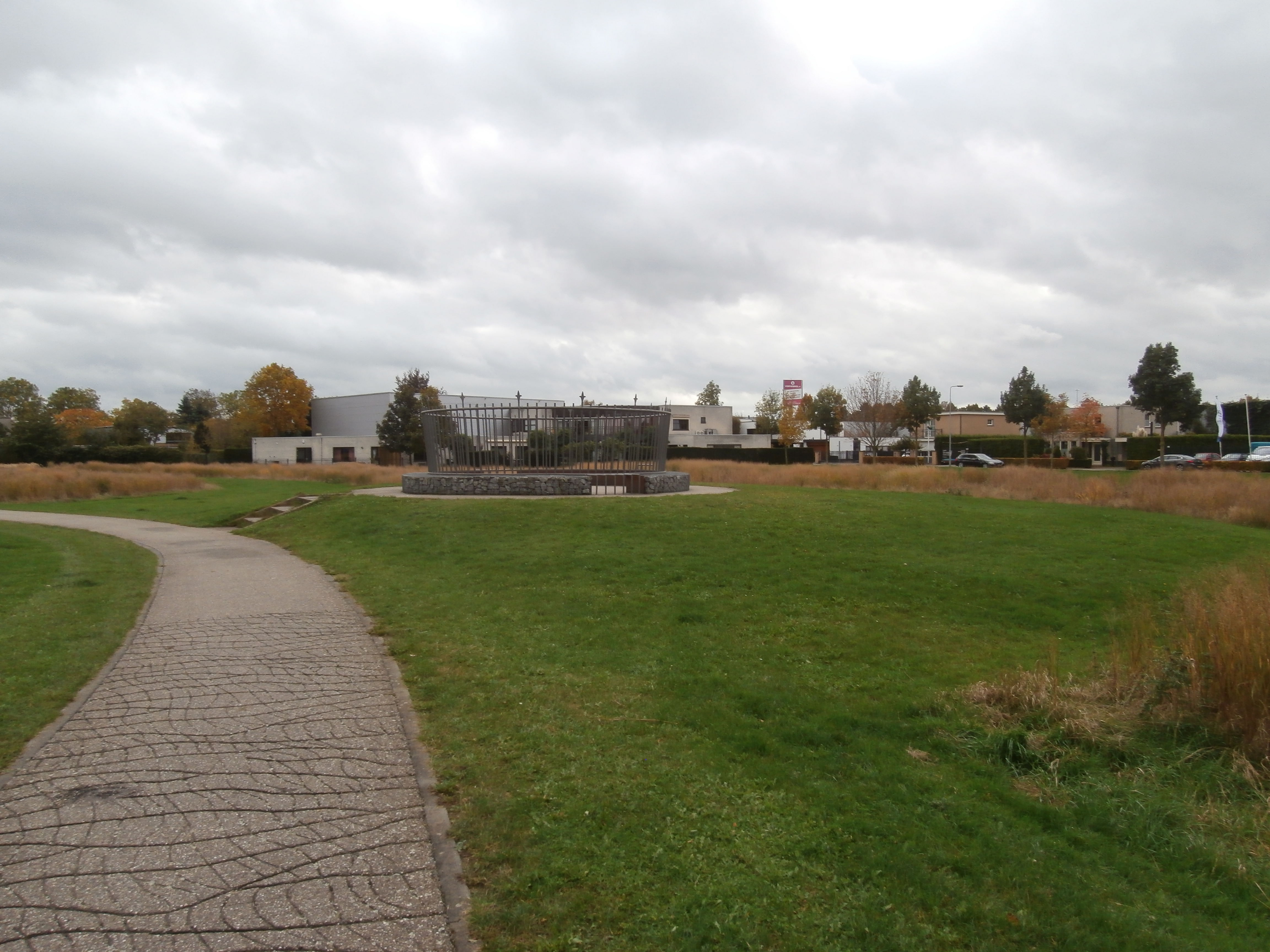
The probable motte.

In 1154 a Daniel of Orthen is witness to the transfer of rights on Park Abbey to Godfrey III, Count of Louvain. It is likely that he was Daniël of Meerwijk, and that his family inhabited a house (castle) at the hamlet Meerwijk near Empel in 1231.

He was likely succeeded by a son Daniel of Meerwijk. In turn he was succeeded by a third Daniel who died between 1251 and 1260, and had a brother Hendrik van Meerwijk. Next came Wouter, and then Jan van Meerwijk. In 1311 Jan van Meerwijk became a bondsman of Guelders for his alod, which consisted of the castle, outer bailey and some land. Turning an alod into a fief was not favorable for the local lord, but happened more often in the area as Guelders and Brabant were encroaching on the Meuse. The high jurisdiction of Empel en Meerwijk was a loan from Guelders via the Lord of Megen. The low jurisdiction was a loan from Brabant.

The first version of Empel en Meerwijk Castle was probably a motte-and-bailey castle. In the 21st century limited archaeological excavations took place and found what might have been a motte. The form of the suspected motte has been made visible in the Castle park by placing a panna cage.

=== The Van Herlaer's Lords of Empel en Meerwijk (1342-<1413) ===
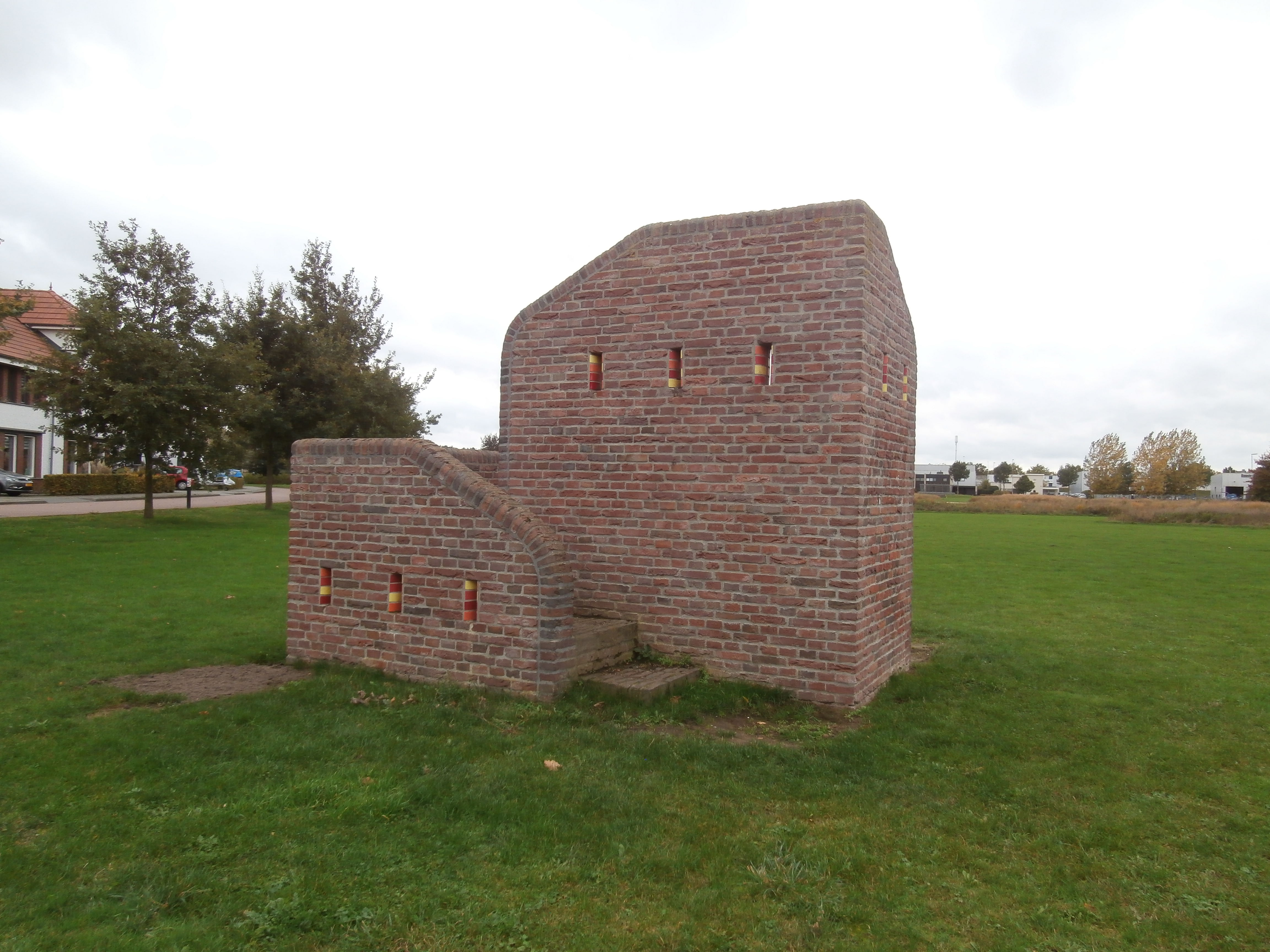
The Empel Folly indicates a 14th-century brick oven.

In 1342 Johan of Meerwijk transferred the high and low jurisdiction of Empel en Meerwijk to Johan Scoks van Herlaer, who then received these in loan from the Duke of Brabant. Johan Scoks van Herlaer was a member of the Van Loon family, which was related to the Van Herlaer's. At the time Johan was an older man, perhaps a son of Gerard van Loon and Aleid van Herlaer.

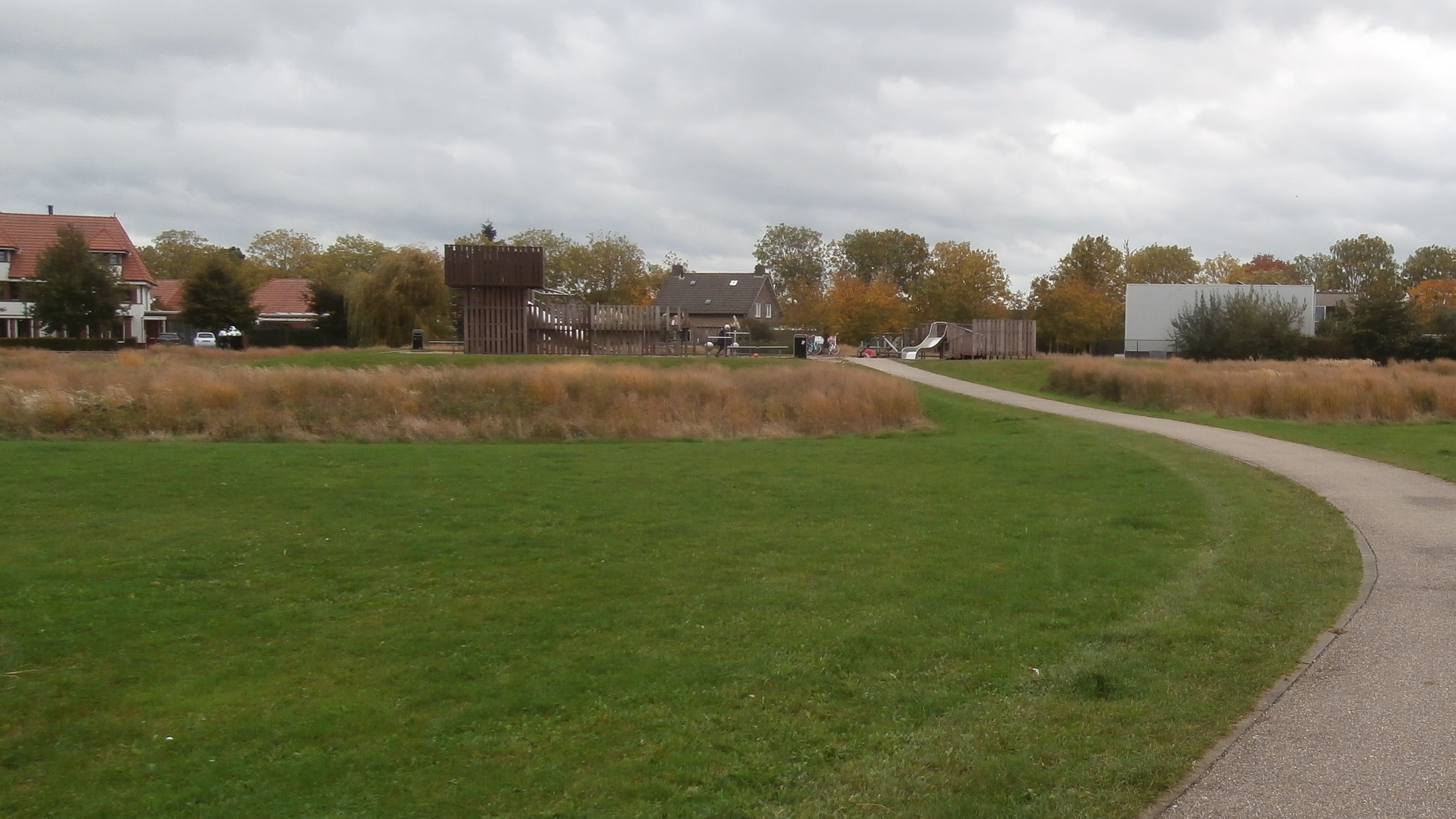
A playground in the form of a castle has been built on top of the ruins.

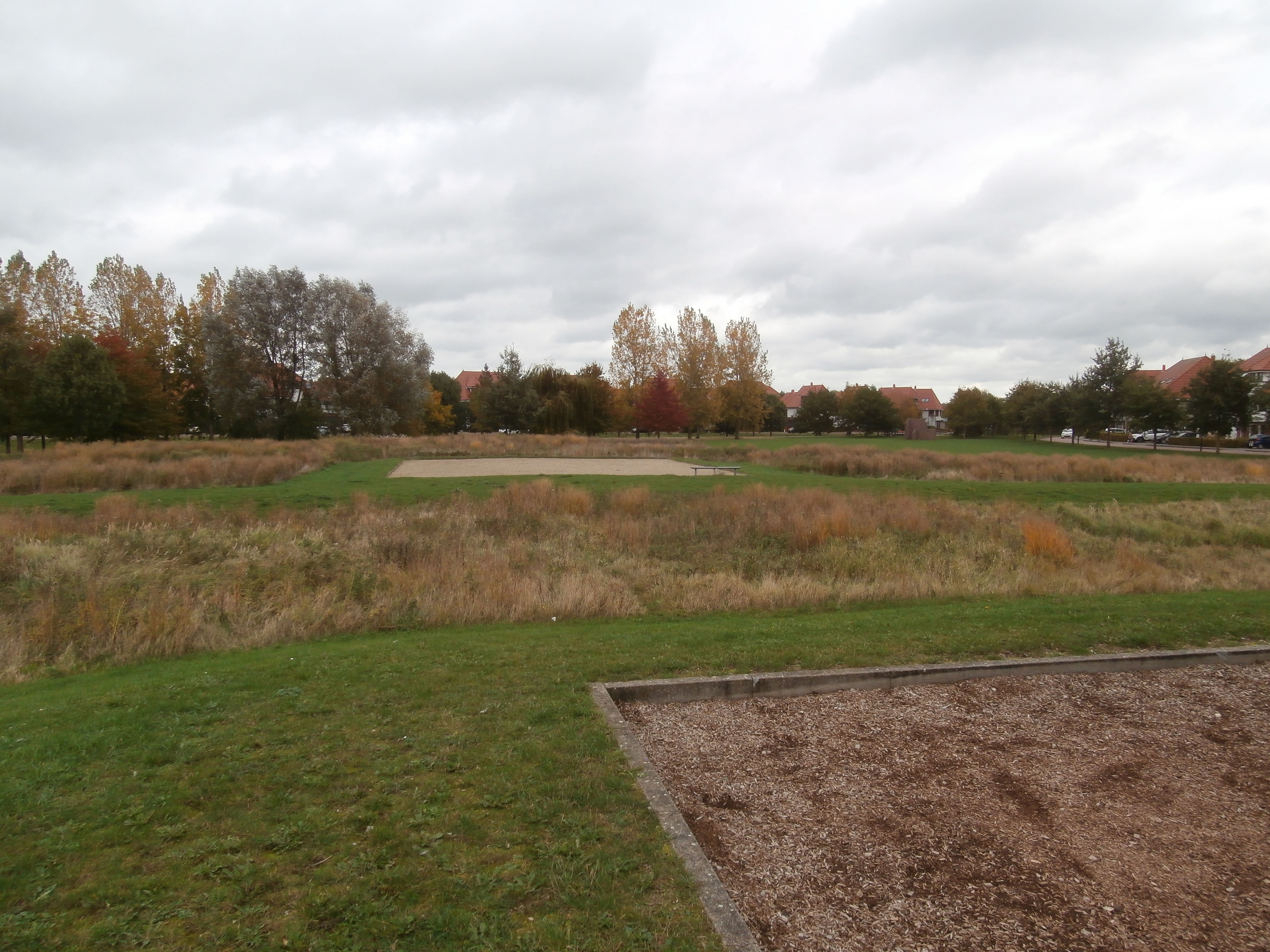
Possible former outer bailey.

A study shows that in 1330-1350 the Van Herlaers gained Empel en Meerwijk Castle, Bokhoven Castle, Ammersoyen Castle, and Poederoijen Castle. It concludes that for the Dukes of Guelders the Herlaers closed their line along the Meuse against Brabant. 'To bind all the strongholds along the river Maas to his person in such a short period clearly indicated a deliberate and strategic military policy of Reinald II.'

By 1348 Knight Gerard (1348-1383/1396) was Lord of Meerwijk. In all probability he was a son of Johan Coc van Herlaer. During the Guelders' Brothers war (1350-1361) Gerard supported Edward, Duke of Guelders against Reginald III, Duke of Guelders, who was supported by Wenceslaus I, Duke of Luxembourg, Duke of Brabant. Later Wenceslaus invaded the Bommelerwaard in 1366 and fought Guelders till 1368. During this war Empel en Meerwijk Castle was occupied by Jan van Redelgem. By 1369 Gerard had been reinstated at Meerwijk. The big picture was that the Dukes of Brabant wanted to gain access to the Meuse, and make it the northern frontier of Brabant.

Jan van Herlaar (>1383-<1413) Lord of Empel en Meerwijk was Gerard's son and successor. He married Agnes de Rover from a 's-Hertogenbosch family. Jan's daughter Jeanne married Willem van Gent from 's-Hertogenbosch in 1413. It's not known whether she inherited Meerwijk. The Herlaer's of Empel en Meerwijk were generally too insignificant to choose sides in the many wars of the era.

On the castle terrain the remains of a 10 by 7 m fourteenth century brick oven were recently found. Therefore, the bricks for the castle, or changes to the castle might have been produced on site. The Empel Folly has been built on top of the medieval oven to commemorate it.

=== 15th and 16th centuries ===
Not much is known about Empel en Meerwijk Castle during this time. Empel was caught up in the many wars with Gelderland, but it is often not clear whether references relate to the castle or the village.

During this time Jan van Wesemael and Daniel van Bouchout were lords. In 1471 the famous House of Arenberg got possession of Empel en Meerwijk. This lasted till 1566.

== The Eighty Years' War ==
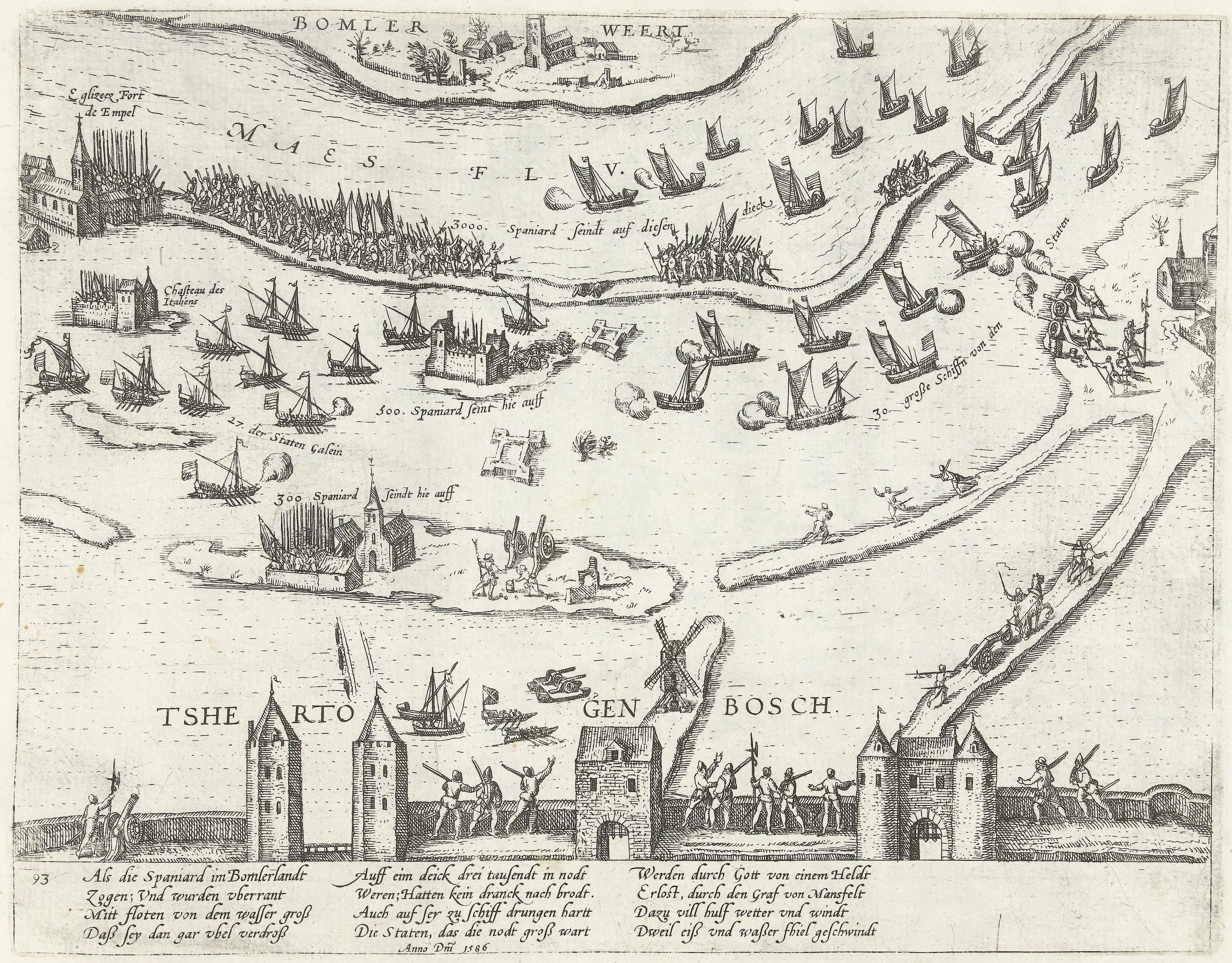
Battle of Empel in 1585

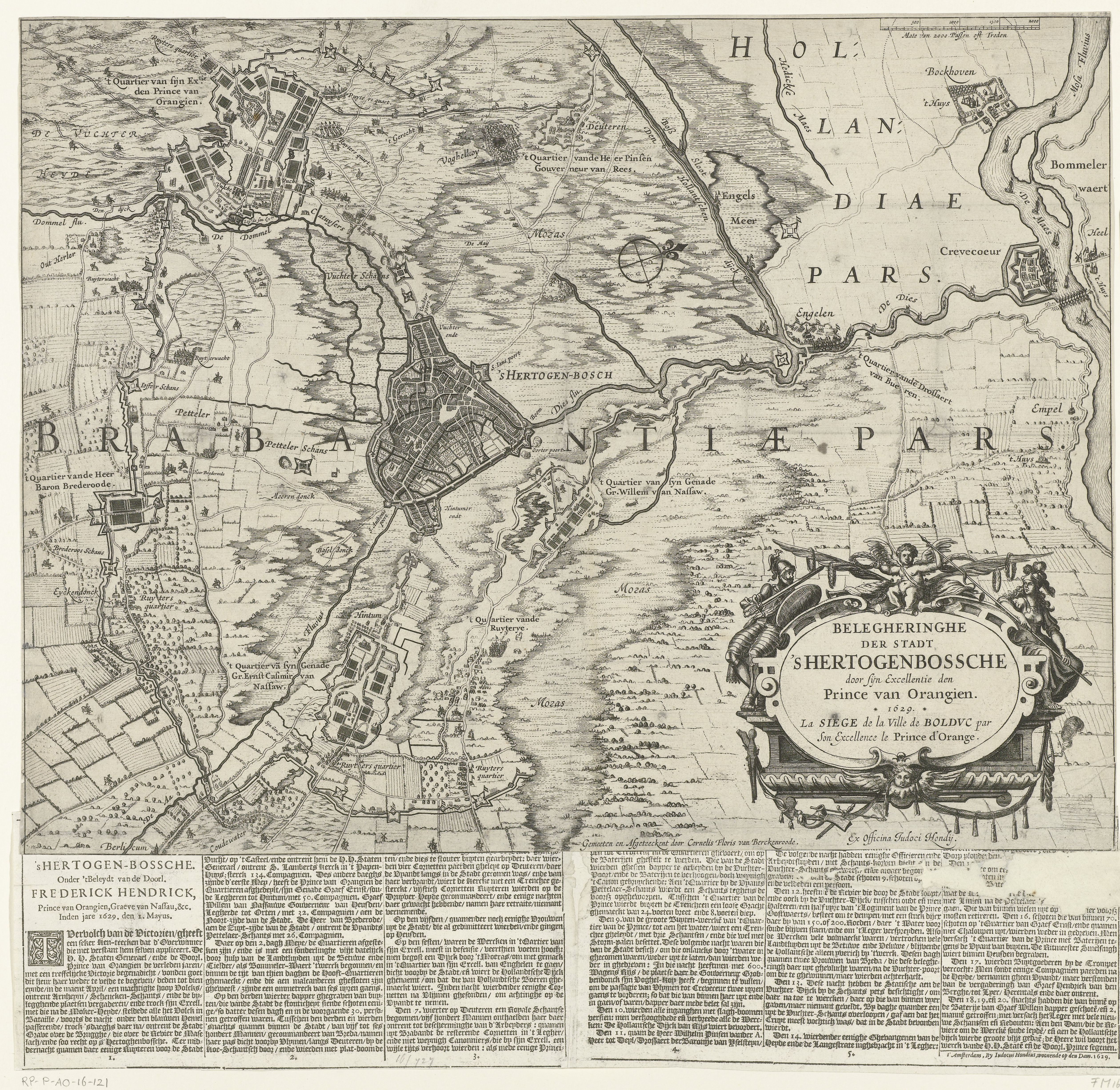
Map of 1629 showing the castle on the extreme right.

During the Eighty Years' War (1568-1648) there are clear references to Empel en Meerwijk Castle. The city of 's-Hertogenbosch was surrounded by defensive structures. There were the small fortified towns of Helmond, Eindhoven and Megen. A dozen castles, including Empel en Meerwijk Castle, was often garrisoned to protect the countryside. Sconces like the one at Oud-Empel on the Meuse covered other strategic points.

By the end of 1579 there were garrisons in the fortified church at Orthen, the convents of Koudewater and Annenborch in Rosmalen, the fort at Engelen, and the castle and sconce of Empel. In 1583 there were Royalist Walloon and Italian garrisons at Empel en Meerwijk Castle and at Nieuwland (Houses of Nieuwland and Empel). These allies repeatedly came to blows with citizens of 's-Hertogenbosch.

In November–December 1585 the events known as the Battle of Empel or 'Miracle of Empel' took place near the castle. About 4,000 Spanish troops had marched into the Bommelerwaard c. 20 November. The Republican side then simply inundated the area, forcing the Spanish to retreat. C. 3,000 Spanish next got stuck on a fragment of the southern Meuse dyke which included the village Empel (now 'Oud-Empel). Other troops got stuck on some heights, including that of Empel en Meerwijk Castle. When the Spanish saw that all the land between the Meuse Dyke and 's-Hertogenbosch was inundated, they tried to dig in. However, without food and shelter they were quickly getting decimated by hunger and cannon fire from Dutch ships. In the end, a sudden severe frost and or the arrival of cannon from 's-Hertogenbosch, saved the troops.

During the Siege of Grave (1586) Hohenlohe took the sconce of Lithoijen and the houses of Batenburg and Empel. He then cut the dykes, but even though he reinforced Grave, its loss was not prevented.

For the inhabitants of Empel en Meerwijk the war was a catastrophe. Their lands were inundated almost continuously from 1579. In 1599 the Spanish side took Fort Crèvecoeur and Oud-Empel became inhabited again, but the reprieve would not last.

In March 1600 Maurice, Prince of Orange retook Fort Crèvecoeur and soon after he took Oud-Empel, Alem, Kessel, Lith and Lithijen. It completed the Republic's conquest of the southern shore of the Meuse up to the neutral territory of Ravenstein. Maurice then ordered the Meuse dykes to be cut and the Dieze to be blocked, flooding the area of Empel en Meerwijk. During the Twelve Years' Truce (1609-1621) the dykes were repaired.

The list of lords and ladies of Empel en Meerwijk during the Eighty Years' War is as follows.

- 1570-1599 Catharina van Tswijffel
- 1599-1609 Adam van Esseren married to Odilia van Herff.
- 1609-1620 Willem van Esseren
- 1620-.... Johan Hendrick van Esseren. No new lord is mentioned till 1645.

It's likely that the years up to the twelve years' truce were disastrous for the castle. Empel en Meerwijk Castle is not depicted on most of the many maps of the 1629 Siege of 's-Hertogenbosch. Even when they depict the Sconce of Empel most of them do not depict Empel en Meerwijk Castle. Some do, but these are not the most detailed maps of siege. Therefore, one can doubt that these few depictions are contemporary and precise.

== Meerwijk en Empel Castle in States' Brabant (1629-1795) ==
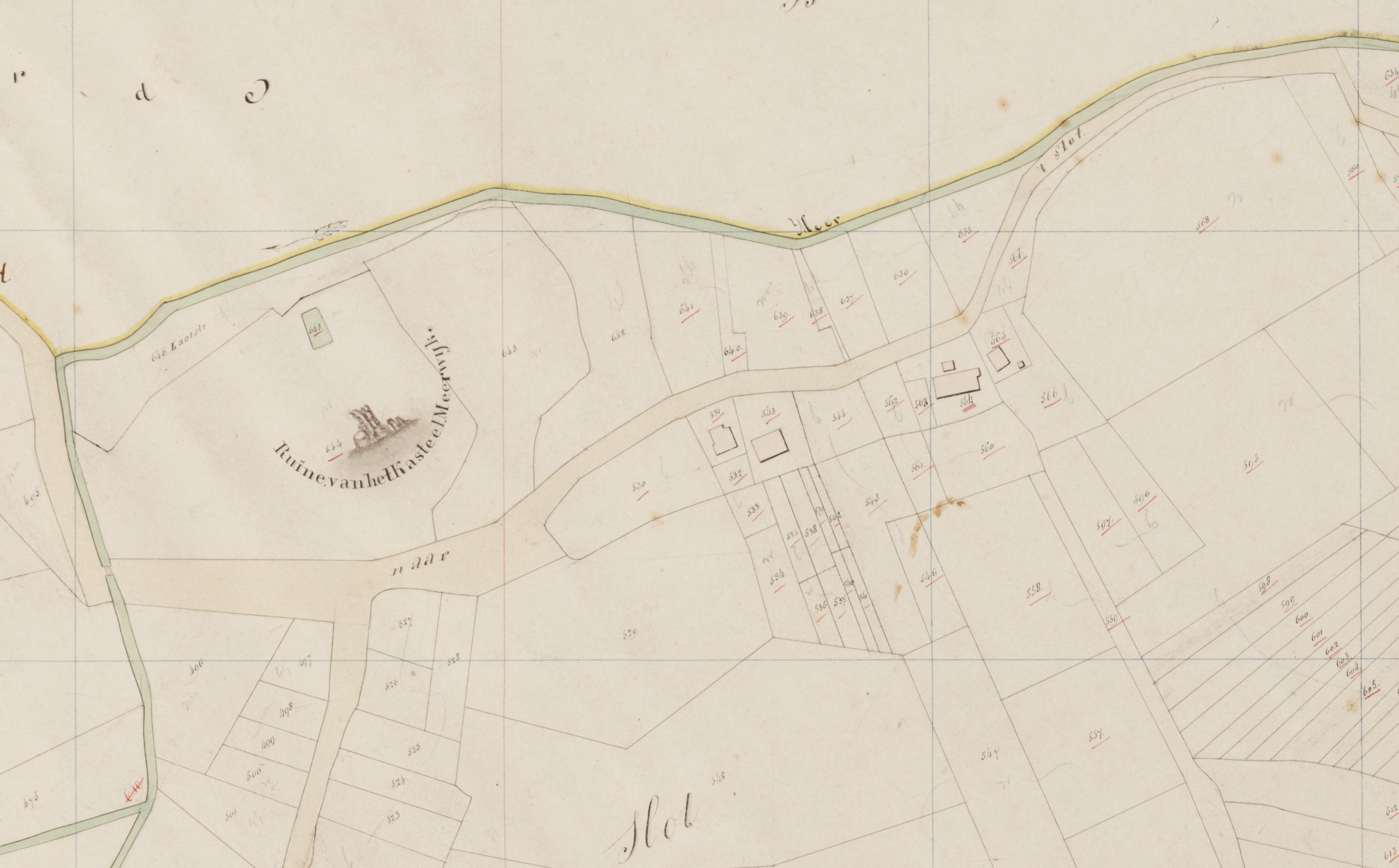
Empel en Meerwijk ruins on an early 19th century map.

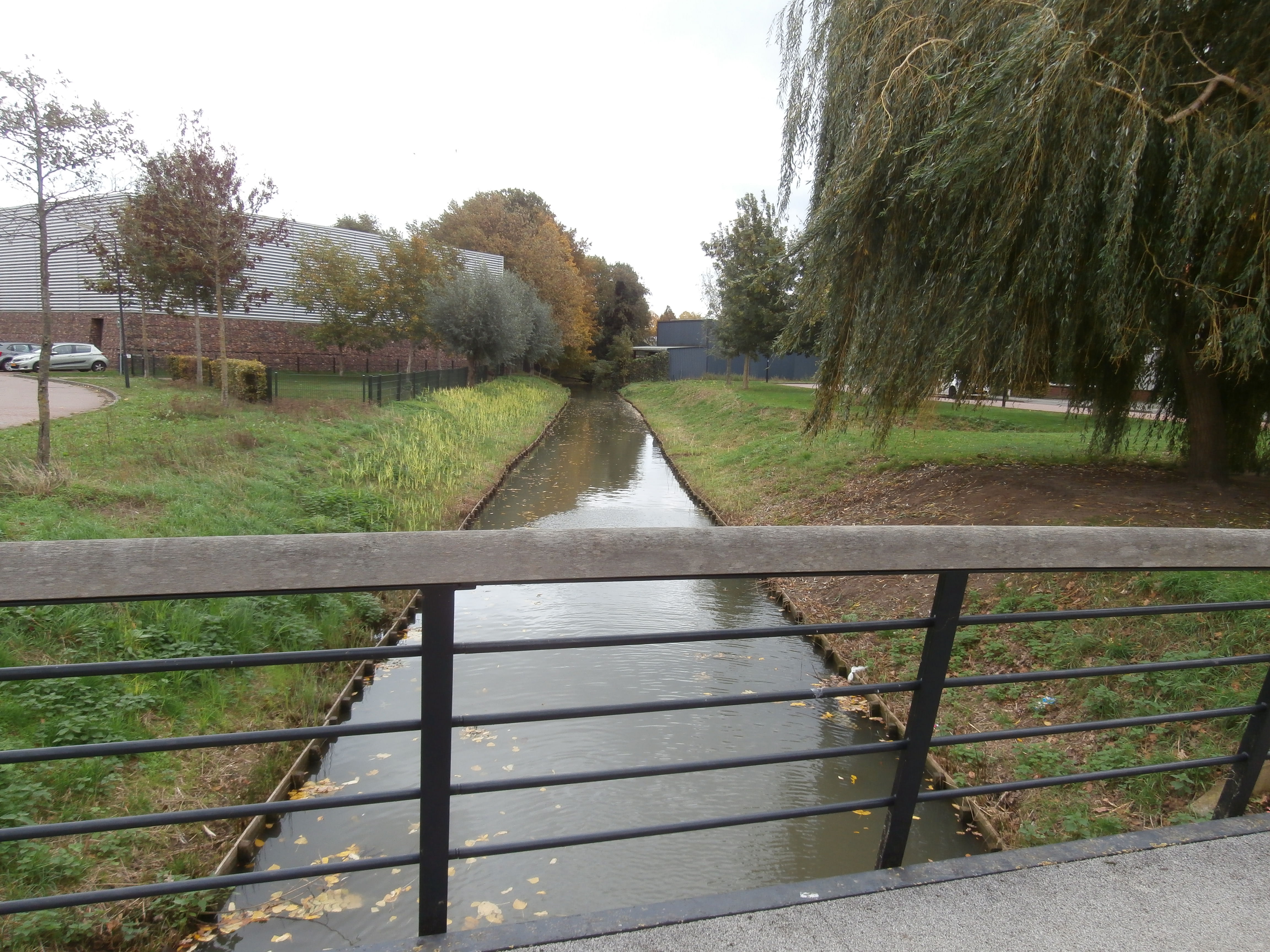
Water called 'Het Meer', just north of the Castle terrain.

After the fall of 's-Hertogenbosch in 1629, Empel en Meerwijk became a permanent part of States's Brabant. That is the part of Brabant ruled by the United Provinces. In 1645 Philips Baron van Leefdael described the Lordship of Empel and Meerwijk. He mentioned that it had previously belonged to the Van Eynhout family, but was then owned by Johan Didrick van Staelberg Lord of Efferen. There were some vestiges of an old castle with a beautiful loan register and other goods. The list of lords of Meerwijk during the last one and a half century of the ancien regime is as follows:

- 1645 Johan Diderik van Staelberg
- 1670-1676 Baron Ferdinand Raidt von Frenz
- 1676-1697 Frans Freiherr von Frenz,
- 1697-1732 Frans Carel baron van Frenz
- 1732-1741 Maria Anna widow of Frans
- 1741-1761 Elisabeth von Frenz
- 1761-1766 Hugo, vrijheer van Kessel-stad
- 1766-1798 Johan Willem Hannes

During the rule of Johan Willem Hannes a new manor was built in Dieskant at the east bank of the Dieze. At first it was called Nieuw Meerwijk. It would later be broken down, and be replaced by a nineteenth century Tudor Revival Style mansion.

This hastened the decay of the ruinous castle, which was later demolished.

== Current Situation ==
=== Archaeological excavations ===
When the new village Empel was built to replace what is now Oud-Empel, the subterranean ruins became part of a new big village. After Empel had been annexed by 's-Hertogenbosch in the 1970s, and new developments started, the future of the archaeological remains became a concern. The municipality decided to perform limited archaeological excavations, to establish their exact extend. Next they were preserved by covering them with a thick layer of earth.

=== Castle Park ===
The terrain could obviously not be used to build houses, and so it became an outdoor activity park called Kasteelpark Empel. The ground plan of the castle has been made visible by differences in height and vegetation. The park targets the local population with many facilities for outdoor activity. A playground with a small tower was realized on top of the former keep. A pétanque court was made at the site of the supposed outer bailey of the castle. The probable motte was crowned by a panna cage. The park also has a basketball court and a skatepark.
