= Andriëtte Bekker =

South African mathematical statistician

Andriëtte Bekker (born 1958) is a South African mathematical statistician. She is a professor at the University of Pretoria, and head of the statistics department at the university.

== Education ==
Bekker earned her Ph.D. in 1990 at the University of South Africa. Her dissertation, Veralgemening, samestelling en karakterisering as metodes om parameterryke verdelings te vind [Generalising, compounding, and characterising as methods to obtain parameter-rich distributions], was supervised by J. J. J. Roux.

== Recognition ==
Bekker is an Elected Member of the International Statistical Institute.
