= Detlef Kraus =

German pianist

Detlef Kraus

Detlef Kraus (30 November 1919 – 7 January 2008) was a German pianist. He was an internationally known interpreter of the music of Johannes Brahms.

Born in Hamburg, Kraus gave his first concert at the age of 16, playing The Well-Tempered Clavier of Johann Sebastian Bach. His later emphasis was on Brahms, together with conductors like Ferenc Fricsay, Rafael Frühbeck de Burgos, Eugen Jochum, Hans Knappertsbusch, Joseph Keilberth, Kurt Masur, Wolfgang Sawallisch, and Hans Schmidt-Isserstedt, performing in New York City, Tokyo, London, and Berlin.

From 1982 he was the president, later the honorary president, of the Johannes-Brahms-Gesellschaft in Hamburg; there he initiated the city's first Brahms competition. He taught piano at the Konservatorium Osnabrück and the Folkwang-Hochschule in Essen. Kraus published numerous papers on Brahms.

Kraus died of heart failure on January 7, 2008, at the age of 88.

== Prizes ==
- Brahms-Prize of the city of Hamburg (1975)
- Brahms-Prize of the Brahms Society of Schleswig-Holstein (1997)
