= Ernst Immanuel Bekker =

German legal scholar

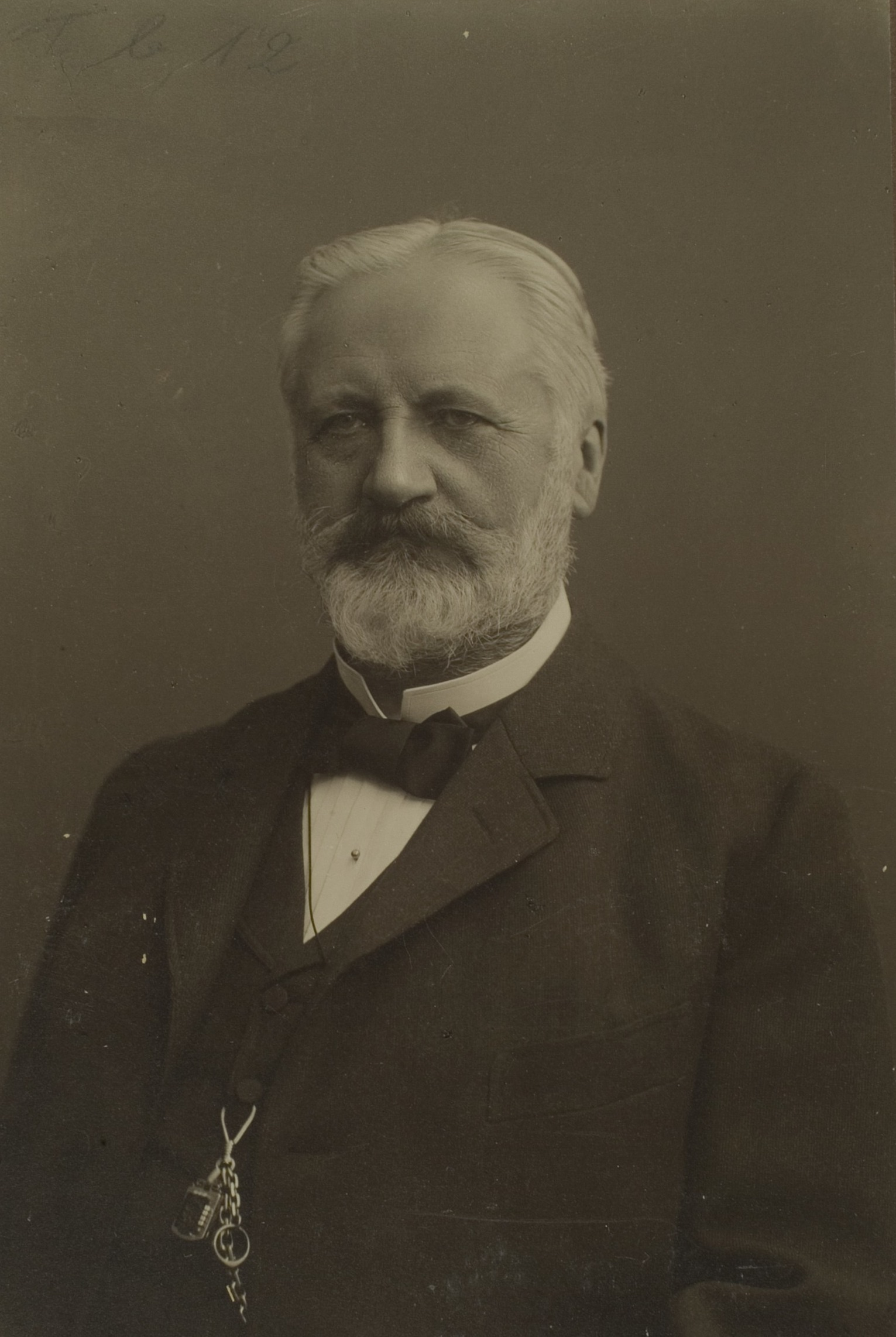
Ernst Immanuel Bekker, 1899

Ernst Immanuel Bekker (16 August 1827 in Berlin – 29 June 1916 in Heidelberg) was a German jurist and professor.

== Life ==
Bekker studied law at Heidelberg, where he was a member of the Corps Saxo-Borussia. In 1853 he gained his Habilitation at the Martin-Luther-Universität Halle-Wittenberg in Roman law. He was extraordinary professor there from 1855 until he was called to an ordinary professorship at Greifswald in 1857. In 1874 he finally returned to Heidelberg. In 1886, he became Pro-Rector of the University of Heidelberg, and became emeritus in 1908. He remained in Heidelberg until his death.

Besides work on Roman law Bekker principally wrote philosophical treatises and works on natural science.

== Works ==
- Die prozessualische Konsumption, 1853
- Von deutschen Hochschulen Allerlei: was da ist und was da sein sollte, 1869
- Die Aktionen des römischen Privatrechts, 1871–1873
- Das Recht des Besitzes bei den Römern, 1880
- System des heutigen Pandektenrechts, 1886–1889
- Recht muss recht bleiben, 1896
- Die Reform des Hypothekenwesens als Aufgabe des norddeutschen Bundes, Berlin 1867
- Das Völkerrecht der Zukunft, Heidelberg 1915.(Sitzungsberichte der Heidelberger Akademie der Wissenschaft - phil.-historische Klasse, 3)

== Biographies ==
- Dagmar Drüll: Heidelberger Gelehrtenlexikon 1803–1932. Springer, Berlin and elsewhere 1986, ISBN 3-540-15856-1, pp. 16–17.
- Dietrich Lang-Hinrichsen (1955). "Bekker, Ernst Immanuel". Neue Deutsche Biographie (in German). Vol. 2. Berlin: Duncker & Humblot. p. 25.
