= Battle of Empel =

1585 battle of the Eighty Years' War

Miracle of Empel
- Part of the Eighty Years' War
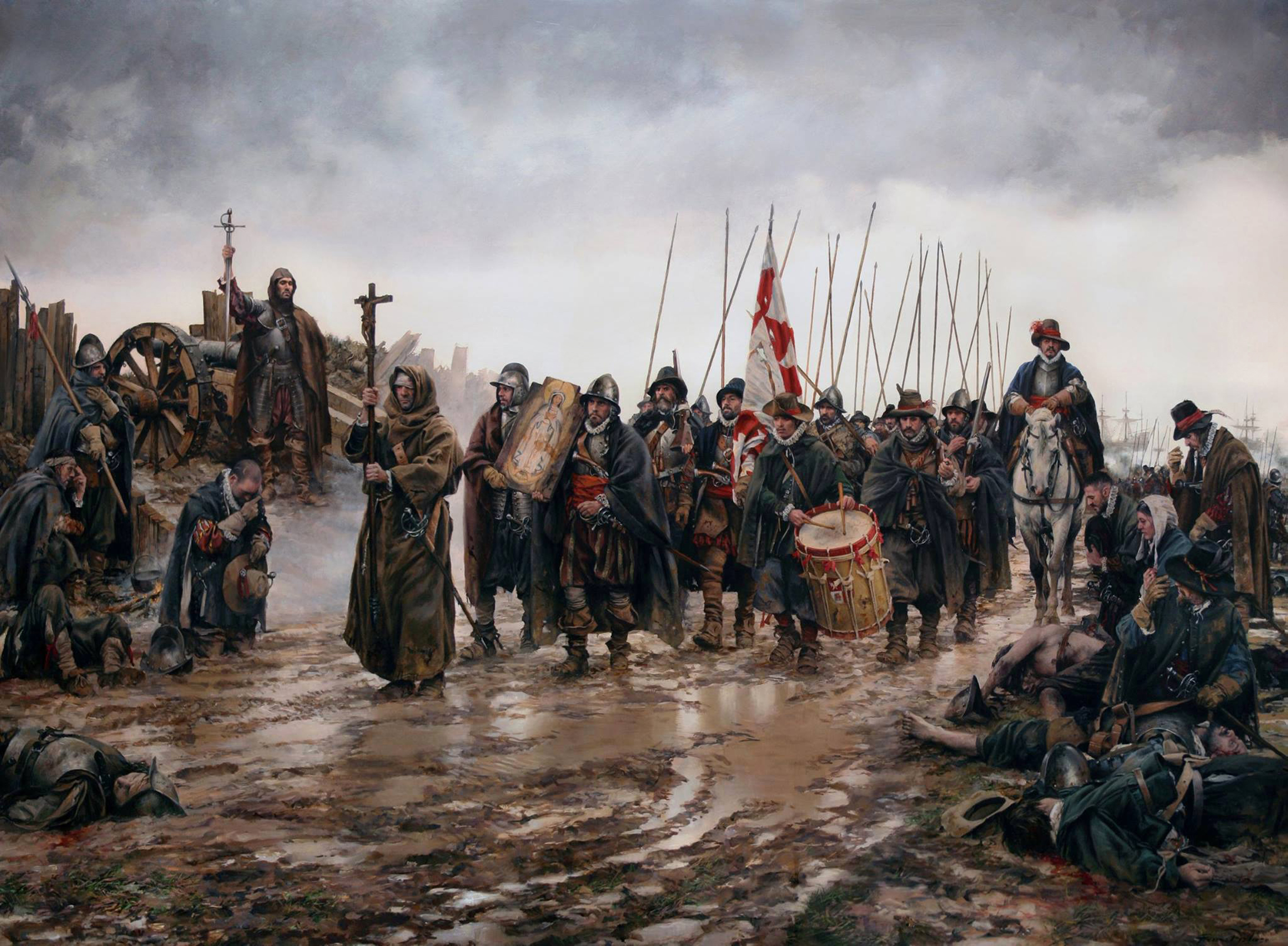
- The miracle of Empel; Augusto Ferrer-Dalmau, 2015
Date	December 6–8, 1585
Location	Empel, Netherlands, between the Meuse and Waal rivers. 51°43′52″N 5°19′38″E
Result	Spanish victory

Belligerents
(Dutch Republic) States-General	Spain

Commanders and leaders
(Dutch Republic) Philip of Hohenlohe-Neuenstein	(Spain) Juan del Águila; (Spain) Francisco Arias de Bobadilla

Strength
30,000 men 100–200 ships	4,000–6,000 men

Casualties and losses
High; Several ships burnt or captured	Low
- The Netherlands

The Miracle of Empel (Milagro de Empel in Spanish) was a Spanish victory on December 8, 1585, near Empel, in the Netherlands during the Eighty Years' War. A Dutch force under Philip of Hohenlohe-Neuenstein had trapped several thousand Spanish soldiers of the Army of Flanders under Francisco Arias de Bobadilla on an island between the Meuse and Waal rivers by breaching dikes and using naval patrols. The waters around the island unexpectedly froze one night after a Spanish soldier digging a trench found a painting of Mary, mother of Jesus, allowing the Spanish to drive the Dutch ships away before defeating the Dutch army.

Remembered as an unexpected victory, In 1892, the Queen Regent of Spain, Maria Christina of Austria, proclaimed Mary of the Immaculate Conception the patron of Spanish infantry.

== Background ==
In 1585 the Dutch Revolt raged in full force. Tensions ran high and cities changed powers. In March of that year, Nijmegen had chased away the Protestant magistrate to put itself under the protection of the Prince of Parma. In addition, the prince captured Antwerp on August 17. Incidentally, he had already had plans in 1579 to seize that famous city on the Scheldt, but for practical reasons he then directed his offensive against Maastricht, which city fell into his hands after a siege of several months.

After the adventure with the Duke of Anjou, support from France, itself going through a time of internal conflict, had become a highly problematic matter. English support offered more prospects, all the more so as Queen Elizabeth I would be pleased to put her foot in the way of Philip II of Spain, especially if she could press that foot firmly into Dutch soil. On August 20, 1585, she concluded the Treaty of Nonsuch with the States General, which provided for the sending of an army of 6,000 men, while receiving Flushing and Brielle as collateral for the costs to be incurred. Robert Dudley, 1st Earl of Leicester, would do this job for her.

The young Maurice, Prince of Orange, stadtholder of Holland since November 1, 1585, was faced with a difficult task.

== Battle ==
After the campaign of 1585, the Governor of Spanish Netherlands and commander of the Spanish troops Alesander Farnese, Prince of Parma decided to go into winter quarters in the Northern Dutch territory. The troops of Karl von Mansfeld occupied the area around 's-Hertogenbosch. Some 3000-4000 men of the Spanish Tercio, including Juan del Águila, under Maestre de Campo Francisco Arias de Bobadilla were stationed in Bommelerwaard, which was supposed to be rich enough to support these troops through the winter. But all the farmers had left the island, taking their livestock with them.

To make the situation of the hungry Spanish troops even worse, Dutch commander Philip of Hohenlohe-Neuenstein arrived with a strong land force and 100 ships. The Dutch leader offered an honorable surrender to the Spaniards but Arias' response was resolute: «Los infantes españoles prefieren la muerte a la deshonra. Ya hablaremos de capitulación después de muertos.» (English: "Spanish soldiers prefer death to dishonor. We will talk about surrender after death"). Philip of Hohenlohe-Neuenstein breached the dikes of Bommelwaard, forcing the Spanish back over the river Maas to higher ground around Empel. From there they were unable to reach 's-Hertogenbosch, because the terrain was flooded and guarded by Hohenlohe's fleet. The island was attacked also by artillery fire from a fort, at the other side of the river. The situation for the Spanish looked desperate.

At night, the Spanish managed to drive the Dutch soldiers firing at them away and force the Dutch ships to pull out of range. Bobadilla ordered a soldier to slip the blockade in a small boat with letters to nearby Spanish commanders to request help. Still surrounded, they fortified on a hill on the island to await reinforcements.

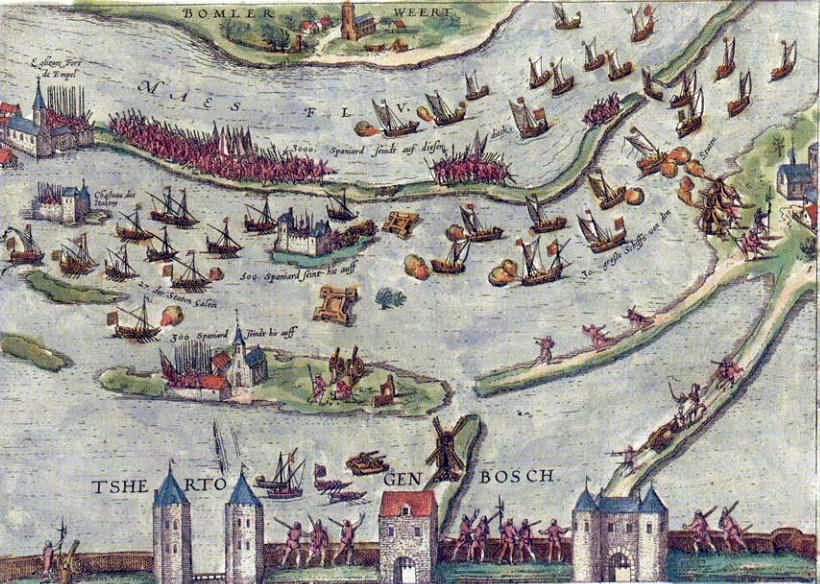
Empel December 1585, as pictured at the end of the 16th century by Frans Hogenberg and Georg Braun.

On learning of this situation, Farnese had gathered a relief column and supplies, then rushed to their rescue. On December 6, a reply from Mansfeld indicated that he would attempt an unlikely assault with 50 ships to break the blockade. Bobadilla prepared 300 Spanish soldiers on nine barges to assist, but the assault never materialized as the Dutch besiegers had in the meantime seized additional positions making the rescue all but impossible.

On the morning of December 7, a Spanish soldier who was digging a trench around the church supposedly commented "this is more likely to be my grave than a trench". As he dug, he found a painting representing Mary of the Immaculate Conception. Bobadilla interpreted the discovery as a sign from God, and had the painting raised next to the Spanish flag for veneration. A priest with the troops encouraged the soldiers to raise their spirits by saying Hail Mary prayers. Running short on nearly all resources, including ammunition, Bobadilla met with his officers to discuss strategy. He advocated for making a final attack with the previously prepared barges, while some officers unsuccessfully advocated for their troops to kill each other to avoid being defeated by the Dutch rebels. In the end, they agreed on a final attack and rebuffed Dutch entreaties to surrender.

That night, a sudden further drop in temperature started to freeze the shallow waters of the flooded countryside, which had not happened for several years in the area. By daytime on December 8, the day of the feast of the Immaculate Conception, the Dutch ships were at risk of being immobilized while exposed to the garrison artillery of 's-Hertogenbosch, attacked by Spanish troops, and burned. The Dutch ships gave up the siege to avoid this possibility, but several ships were destroyed in the frozen Meuse during the retreat.

On December 9, they charged and conquered the Dutch fort located along the river. The Dutch force quickly retreated knowing that without the naval blockade, their position was untenable and reinforcements via the sea from Peter Ernst I von Mansfeld-Vorderort would relieve the Spanish troops. Admiral Hohenlohe-Neuenstein responded by saying: "In my opinion, it seems that God is Spanish to work so great a miracle [for them]. Five thousand Spaniards who were also five thousand soldiers […] and five thousand devils."

That same day, Mary of the Immaculate Conception was proclaimed patroness of the Spanish Tercios of Flanders and Italy.

== In the 19th century ==
On December 8, 1854, Pope Pius IX defined the dogma of the Immaculate Conception of the Blessed Virgin Mary. In 1892 Maria Cristina of Austria (Maria Christina Désirée Henriette Felicitas Rainiera von Habsburg-Lothringen, und Österreich), Queen Regent of Spain, proclaimed Mary of the Immaculate Conception patroness of the entire Spanish Infantry.

== Bibliography ==
- Marek y Villarino de Brugge, André (2020e). Alessandro Farnese: Prince of Parma: Governor-General of the Netherlands (1545-1592): v. V. Los Angeles: MJV Enterprises, ltd., inc. ISBN 979-8689560397.
