= Matthew F. Bekker =

American scientist

Matthew F. Bekker is an environmental geographer and dendrochronologist. He is a professor of geography at Brigham Young University (BYU).

Bekker has a bachelor's degree from BYU, a master's degree from Pennsylvania State University and a Ph.D. in geography from the University of Iowa. Much of his study has been on the effects of forest fires in California (Bekker and Taylor 2001). In 2014 and 2015 he was co-publisher on papers related to the flow of rivers in northern Utah over the last several hundred years. He is most known through his frequently cited publication on the positive feedback between tree establishment and forest advancement (Bekker 2005). He has also demonstrated the use of dendrochronology to reconstruct earthquake events (Bekker 2004).

== Sources ==
- BYU faculty bio
- Bekker article on forest patterns
- Penn State Alumni listing
- Who's Who in Social Science Academia listing
- Bekker 2005
- Bekker and Taylor 2001
- Bekker 2004
