= Empel =

Coordinates: 51°43′52″N 5°19′38″E

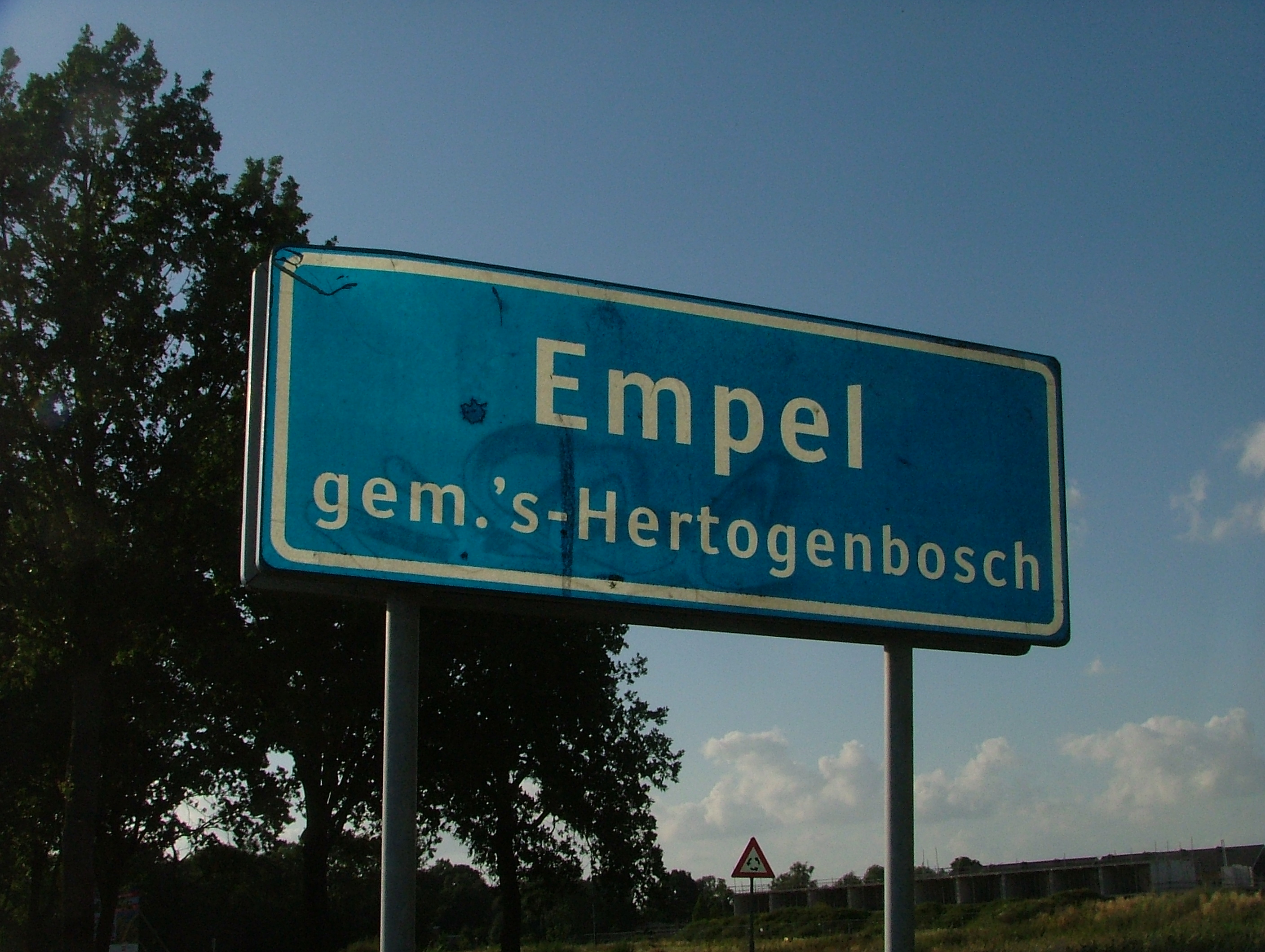

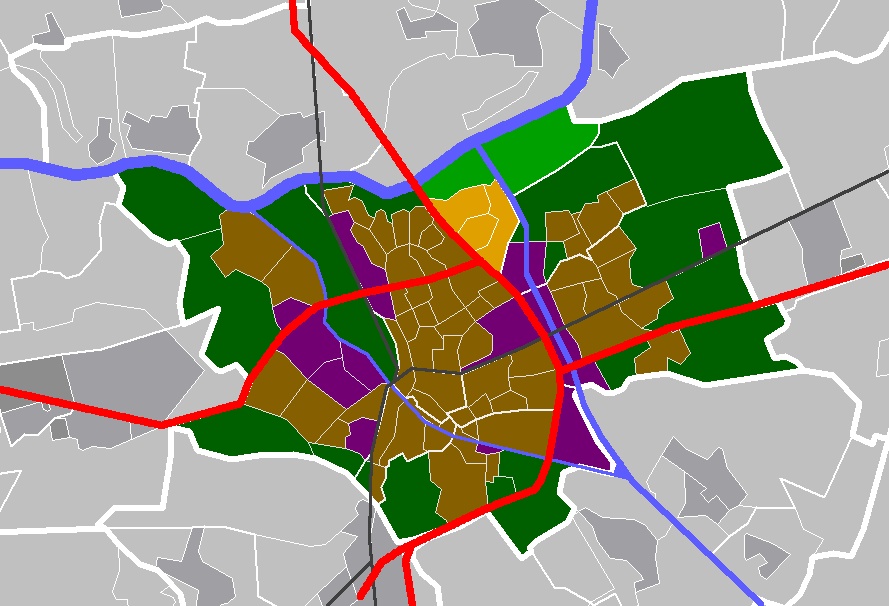
- Country: Netherlands
- Province: North Brabant
- Municipality: 's-Hertogenbosch

Area
  - Total: 6.63 km^{2} (2.56 sq mi)
  - Land: 5.72 km^{2} (2.21 sq mi)
  - Water: 0.91 km^{2} (0.35 sq mi)

Population
  - Total: 5,160
  - Density: 778/km^{2} (2,020/sq mi)

Empel is a village and former municipality, which is now a quarter of 's-Hertogenbosch in the Dutch province of North Brabant.

== History ==
Archaeological evidence shows Celtic and Roman traces in the area. The site of a Roman temple was of special interest.

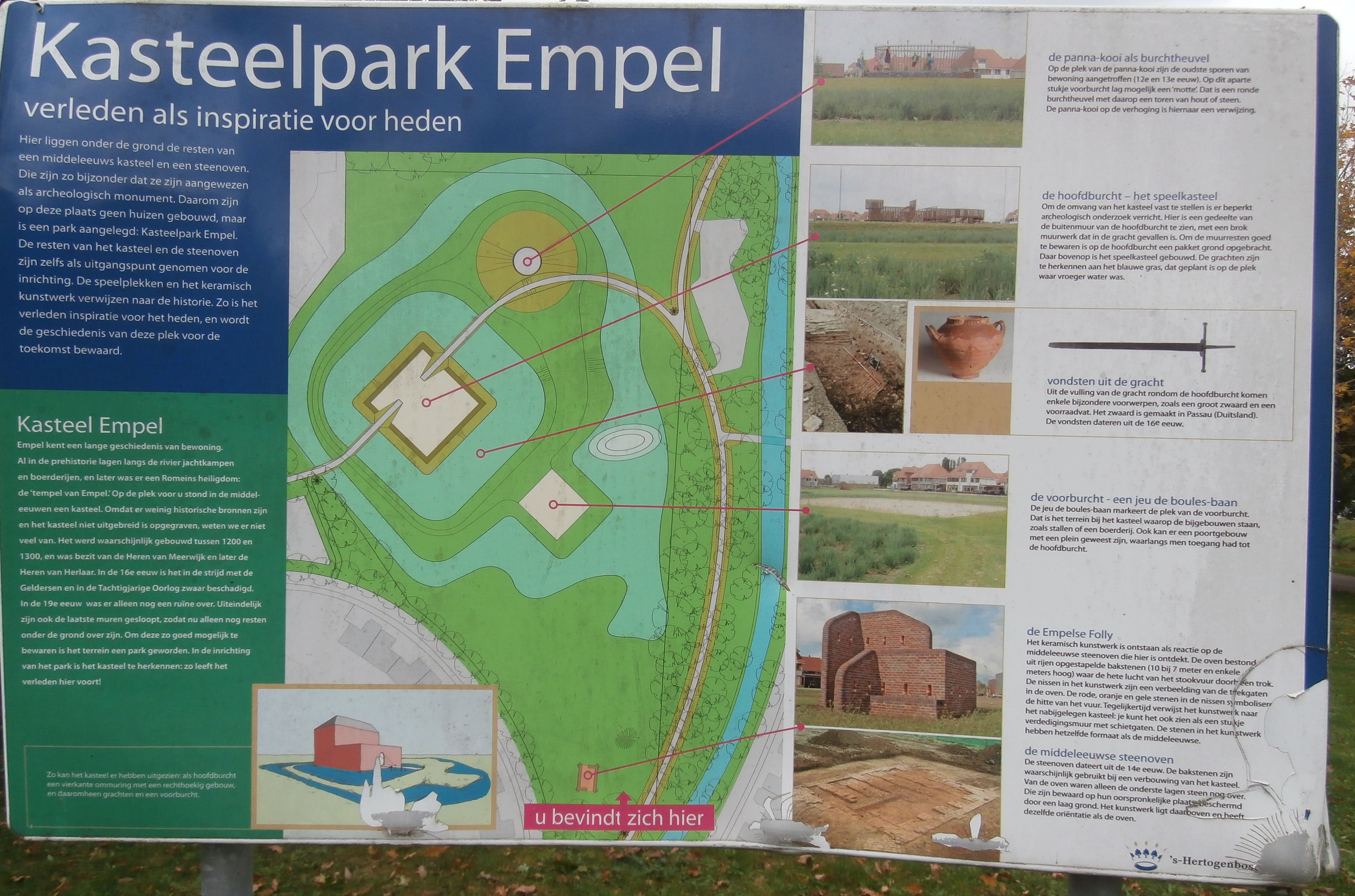
Sign at the castle park

In medieval times there were two Lordships (heerlijkheid) in the area. The Lordship of Empel and the Lordship of Meerwijk, but as they were always in one hand, they became known as Lordship of Empel en Meerwijk. The center was in the village now called Oud-Empel. Empel en Meerwijk Castle, the seat of the Lord of Empel en Meerwijk, was in an area called 'Het Slot', Dutch for 'The Castle'. When Empel village was moved later on, it came to lie inside the new Empel village.

During the Eighty Years' War the area suffered greatly, because it was on the frontline from 1579 till 1609, and then again from 1621 to 1629. Empel village was even abandoned for some decades, and the Castle was probably also ruined in these years. In 1585 the Battle of Empel was named for the village now called Oud-Empel.

In the eighteenth century the owner of the castle built a new manor Meerwijk Castle at Dieskant on the Dieze, hastening the decay of the medieval castle. During the French period the lordships were abolished, and the new municipality of Empel en Meerwijk was formed, with Empel village on the Meuse as seat of the municipal government.

In the closing phases of World War II Empel village on the Meuse dyke was heavily damaged. Its Catholic church was subsequently demolished. From about 1949 the village with church was rebuilt as an Angerdorf at the current location. This was southeast of the old village, which was then renamed Oud-Empel. A new townhouse was also built on the new location of Empel.

In 1971 the entire municipality of Empel en Meerwijk was absorbed by 's-Hertogenbosch municipality. Empel then grew to a city quarter of 6,505 inhabitants. As a city quarter Empel includes the neighbourhoods: Maasakker, De Koornwaard, Empel-Oost and Empel-Zuid. Oud-Empel became part of Maaspoort.

== Points of interest ==
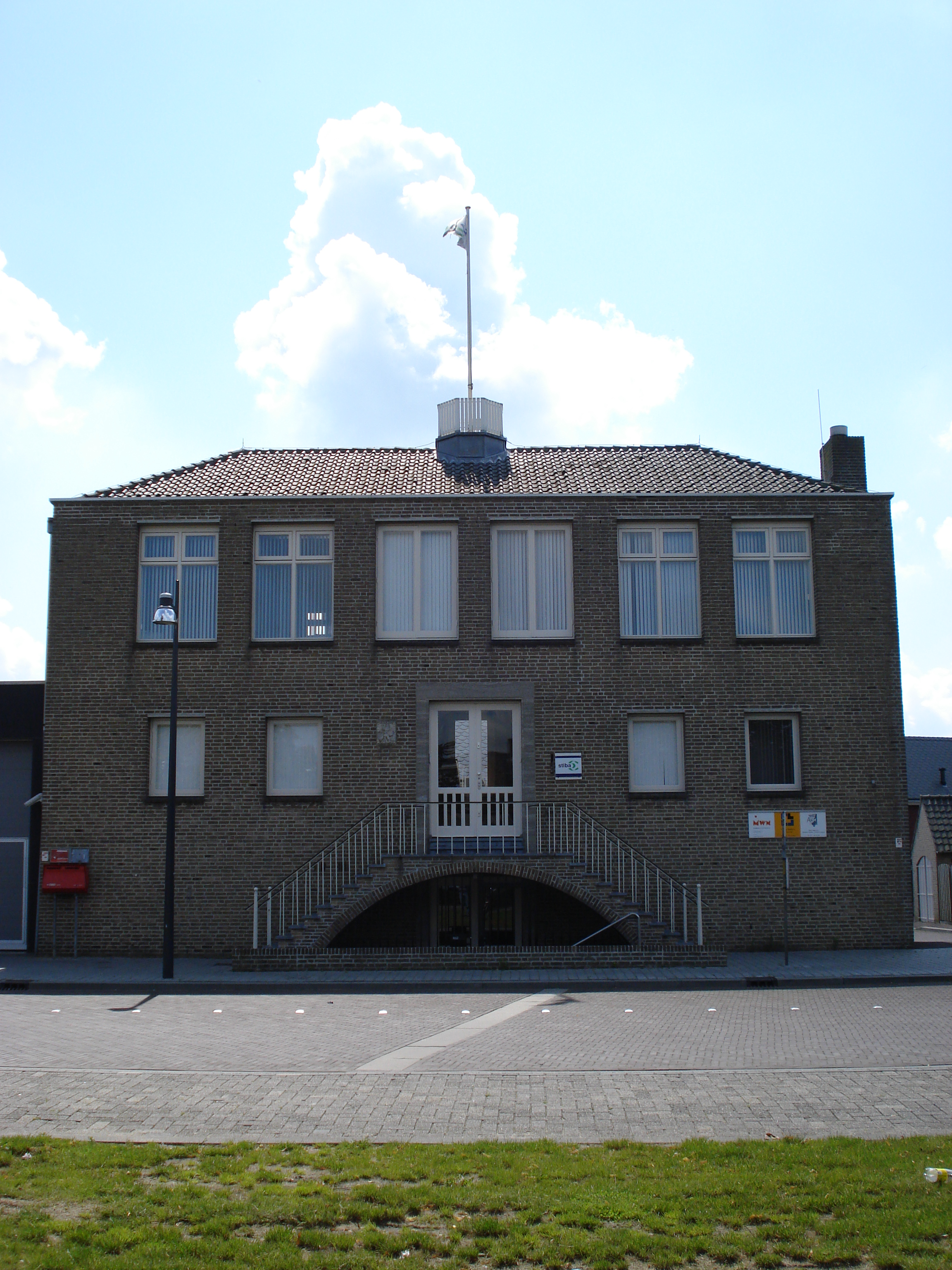
Former seat of the municipality

Empel was the ancient site of a temple dedicated to Hercules Magusanus. It is one of only a few religious monuments from Germania Inferior that can be interpreted with a fair degree of certainty. Hercules Magusanus was the Latin name of the supreme god of the Batavians. Many votive gifts have been found near the temple. Amongst these, the many used weapons indicate that this temple was indeed dedicated to a non-Roman god. These archaeological traces are not available for public viewing.

The Castle Park Kasteelpark Empel is an outdoor activity park. It shows the outline of the motte, keep and outer-bailey of former Empel en Meerwijk Castle. The park has a playground for children, a basketball court, a panna cage, a skatepark and a pétanque court. The park protects the archaeological remains of the castle, as well as those of a medieval brick oven. The latter is covered by the Empel Folly.

The Saint Landelinus Church was inaugurated on 25 December 1949. It replaced the Neogothic Landelinus Church of Oud-Empel which had been destroyed in 1945. The current church is a brick Christocentric church designed by the Tilburg architect N.H. Pontzen (1913-1979). The Stations of the Cross have been painted on the concrete pillars by Egbert Deckers. A cross was made by Albert Termote. Frans van der Burgt made a sculpture of Anthony the Great. A triptych by Léon Wiegman depicts the Miracle of Empel.

The recently dug Máxima Canal (2014) is just east of Empel. It is sided by bicycle lanes that essentially go nowhere, and are therefore very popular with sport enthusiasts.

== Battle of Empel ==
The Battle of Empel or, to the Spanish, Miracle of Empel (Milagro de Empel in Spanish) was a battle fought on December 7 and December 8, 1585, as part of the Eighty Years' War, in which a Spanish army miraculously escaped destruction after discovering a hidden Dutch Catholic image of the Immaculate Conception.

The Spanish army was in a desperate situation, under siege by the Dutch Protestant navy and surrounded by the rivers. The story says that in the night following the discovery of the image, the rivers froze and the Spanish army ran over the frozen rivers escaping from the siege, destroying or capturing all the ships in the Dutch fleet stuck in the ice, and overrunning the Dutch army camp. In Spain, the battle is still remembered as it is believed that the Spanish army was saved due to intervention of Mary of the Immaculate Conception. In memory of the battle, the Immaculate Conception is the patroness of the Spanish infantry.

== Flags ==
Empel does not have an official flag. Although there have been previous designs made by citizens, none of them have been classed as official flags. What Empel does have is an official Coat of Arms.
