= Meerwijk Castle =

- Kasteel Meerwijk
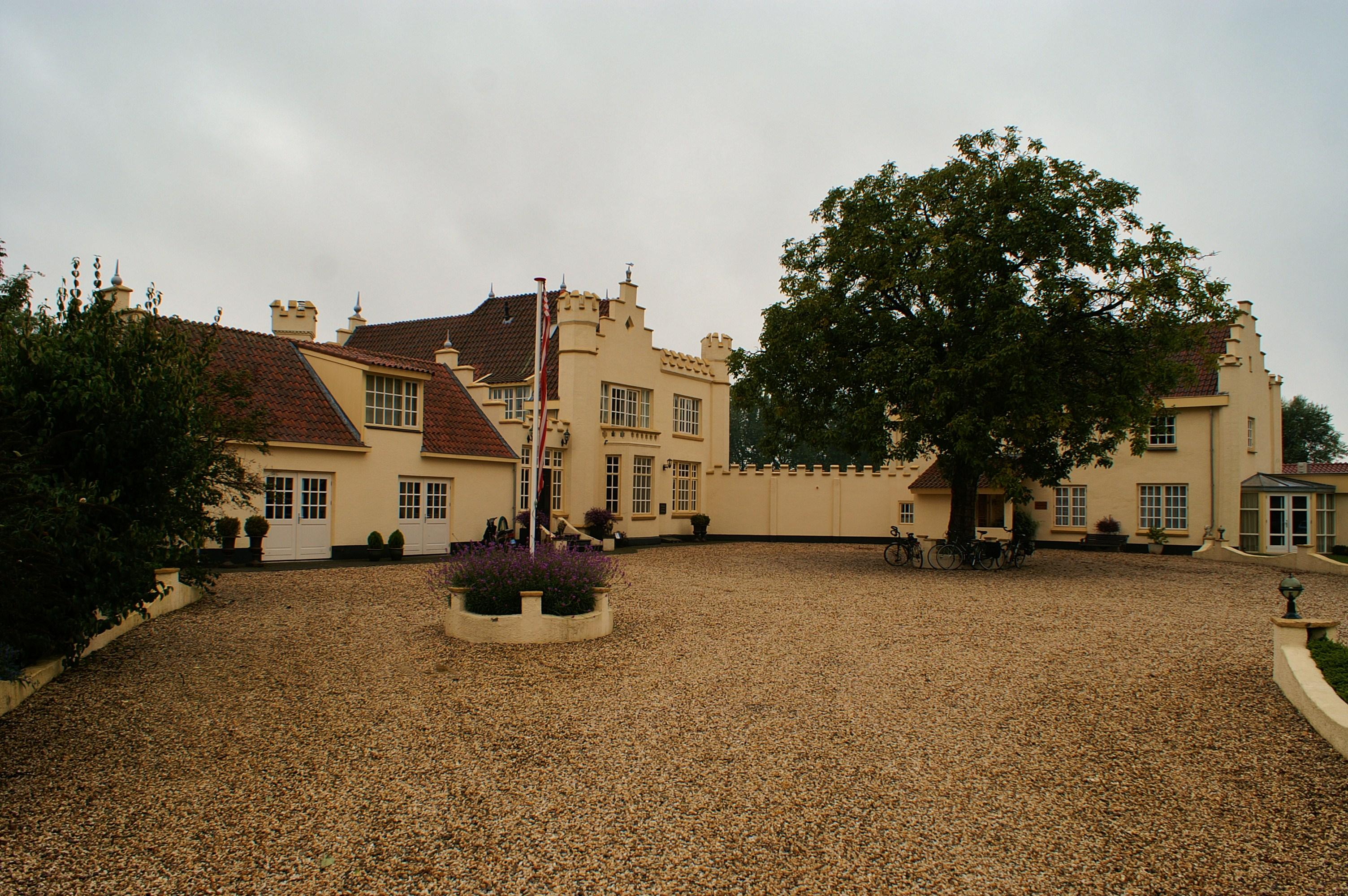
- Meerwijk Castle

- Location within Netherlands

General information
- Architectural style: Tudor Revival architecture
- Location: Gemaalweg, hamlet Dieskant, 's-Hertogenbosch, Netherlands
- Coordinates: 51.721720°N 5.275187°E
- Construction started: 1851
- Client: Jan Willem Hannes

Design and construction
- Architect: Arnoldus van Veggel

Meerwijk Castle is a Tudor Revival Style mansion on the east bank of the Dieze river just north of 's-Hertogenbosch. It was preceded by Meerwijk Manor, built on the same location.

== Medieval Meerwijk Castle ==
In the former municipality of Empel en Meerwijk there once stood a medieval castle after which the manor on the current location was named. This medieval castle has since been demolished, and is now known as Empel en Meerwijk Castle and has little to do with the current mansion. It was owned by the Lord of Meerwijk and Empel when he decided to build a new manor on a different location, and to demolish the remains of the old castle. The current mansion is a successor of this manor, not of the castle.

== (New) Meerwijk Manor ==
=== Lordship of Meerwijk and Empel ===
Johan Willem Hannes (1714–1800) came from Wesel and served the King of Prussia. He married the widowed Johanna Benjamina van Thije (1714–1788). In 1766 he bought the Lordship of Meerwijk and Empel, and so raised the prestige of his family, which lived in Utrecht. His son Johan Abraham Hannes became his local representative. In Dieskant they built a new manor as office and country house. It was called '(New) Meerwijk' after the medieval castle which was situated close to Empel, and which he demolished. The new Lord then called himself J.W. Hannes van Empel. After the death of his wife in 1788 he lived in the Hinthamerstraat in 's-Hertogenbosch.

Johan Abraham Hannes (1743–1820) was the representative for his father from 1766. In 1767, he married Anna Christina van Barnevelt from Gorinchem, where they next lived. The family will have spent many summers at Meerwijk, also after it moved to Arnhem in 1787. After the death of his mother in 1788, Johan Abraham became Johan Abraham van Thije Hannes. In 1794 the feudal rights of the Lords of Empel and Meerwijk were annulled. Even so, the family members continued to call themselves Lords of Empel and Meerwijk.

=== Private property Meerwijk ===
Willem Hendrik van Thije Hannes (1774–1849) became owner of Meerwijk on the death of his grandfather in 1800, skipping Johan Abraham. His sister would inherit 'Dieszigt' a house next to Meerwijk manor. Willem Hendrik lived in the Nieuwstraat in 's-Hertogenbosch and had an impressive career. He entered the municipal council of 's-Hertogenbosch in 1803, was an alderman in 1808–1810, and became vice-mayor 1810–1814.

In 1816, Willem Hendrik became one of the three mayors of 's-Hertogenbosch. He stayed on till 1824, and then continued as alderman till 1834. He was also a member of the states-provincial of North Brabant and still had some other functions. He was one of the richest inhabitants of the province. In 1830 Willem Hendrik and his three sons were included in the Dutch nobility as Jonkheer. He died at Meerwijk in 1849. Portraits of Willem Hendrik and his wife Louise Gertrude Caroline van Rappard (1770-1844) are in the city hall of 's-Hertogenbosch. In 1842 an accurate drawing of Meerwijk Manor was made. In 1992 this drawing was acquired by the Noordbrabants Museum.

== Meerwijk Castle ==
=== Meerwijk Castle is built ===
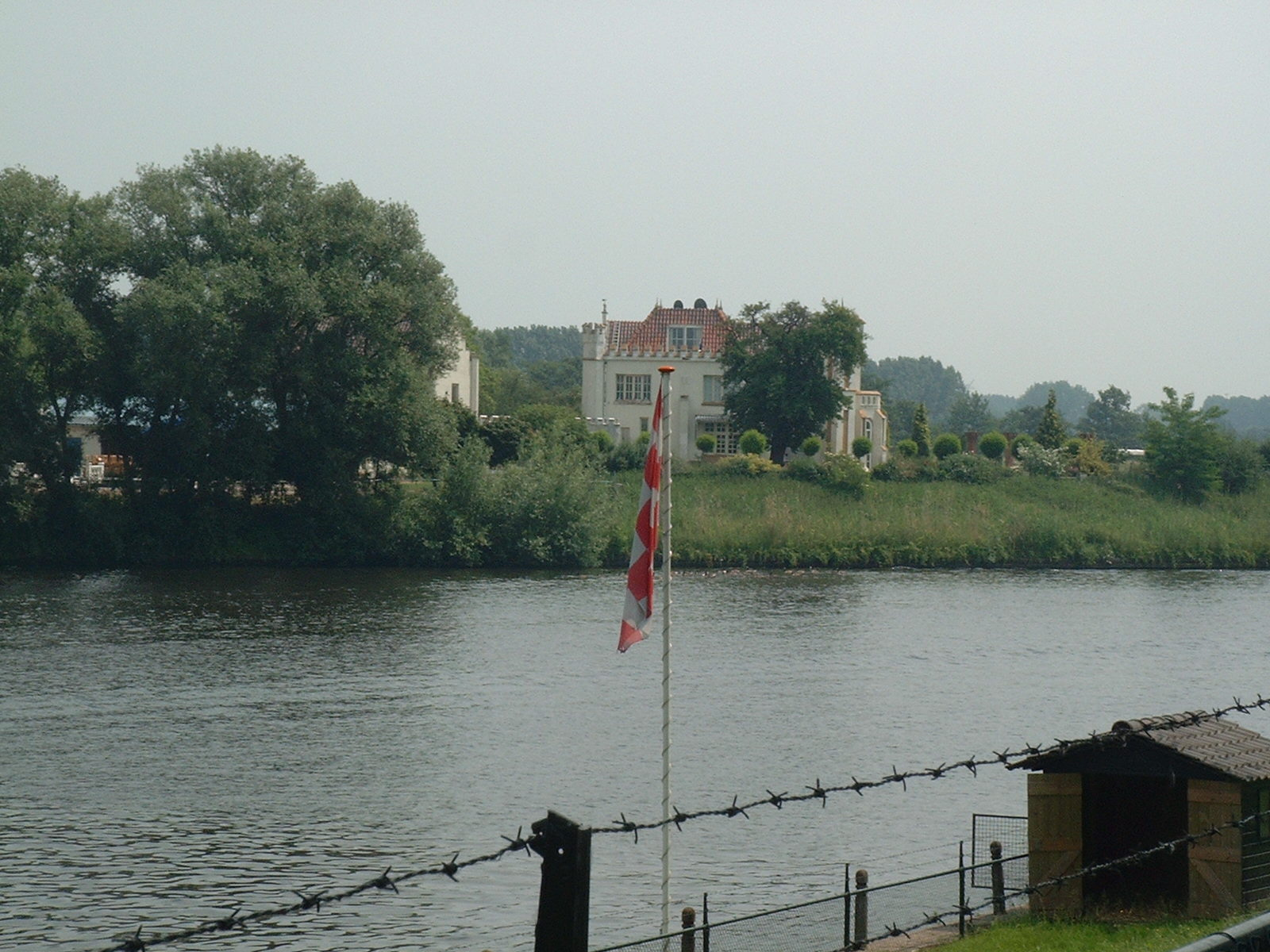
Meerwijk Castle from the other side of the Dieze

In May 1850, a notary sold the estate Meerwijk (Landgoed Meerwijk) for 3,150 guilders. It consisted of a plot in the municipality Empel locally known as at Dieskant. It was on the Dieze across from the village Engelen. On it were two townhouses (herenhuizen), two auxiliary buildings (Neerhuis and Bouwmanswoning), stables, garden, orchard etc. The plot numbers were 152, 153, 154 (half), and 155–160. This was probably how Willem Hendrik's son Jonkheer Master Hendrik Antoni van Thije Hannes got the former manor.

The present 'Castle' was built from 1851. On 18 July 1853, Hendrik Antoni van Thije Hannes, the new 'Lord of Empel and Meerwijk' was welcomed in the municipality. Van Thije Hannes and his family came from 's-Hertogenbosch by carriage, and were first welcomed in Orthen. Here a 'guard' of 30 uniformed citizens on horseback flying the lord's colors welcomed him. Together with a lot of people from the city the column then went to Oud-Empel (at that time known as Empel). Here Van Thije Hannes was received by the municipal government, the mayor, the polder's directors, Empel's young ladies, and a fanfare orchestra playing 'Où peut-on être mieux qu’au sein de sa famille?' Next the column continued to Meerwijk Castle were there was a welcome arch with the text: 'The grateful Empel to its benefactor Jonkheer Mr Hendrik Antoni van Thije Hannes van Empel en Meerwijk' surrounded by flags. The population of Engelen fired a rifle salute from across the Dieze, and the Steam-Paddler Rotterdam fired her cannon. There was food and drink, and in the evening there was a fireworks show at the illuminated castle.

The fairy tale would get a cruel ending in 1856. Hendrik Antoni was president (Proost) of the Illustrious Brotherhood of Our Blessed Lady, judge and member of the municipal council. In 1855, he left the council mid term. By February 1856 he was ill. On 18 March 1856 his wife Charlotte van Thije Hannes, born Löben Sels died. On 8 April 1856 Hendrik Antoni himself died in 's-Hertogenbosch. This was within one year of also losing his only son. His daughter Jacqueline died on 20 June 1856, aged only 18.

To all appearances Jonkheer Johan Willem van Thije Hannes (1809–1871) succeeded to Meerwijk Castle. It was probably he who was welcomed as the new lord shortly after the death of his relative. Jonkheer Johan Willem van Thije Hannes was stated to have been lord of Empel and Meerwijk on his death in 1871.

Already in July 1856 the same notary who had sold the previous manor, offered the pleasant Country house Meerwijk Estate (Landgoed Meerwijk). It included a big castle built in antique style in the previous five years, with houses for the gardener, carriages, and stables. This might simply have had to do with arranging the inheritance. In January 1871 there was a large sale of trees that stood on the estate. In April 1871 it became known that part of the castle grounds would be expropriated in order to straighten the Dieze.

=== The Reijgers family on Meerwijk Castle ===
By late 1872 Meerwijk Castle was owned by Dr. F.J.H. Reijgers. He died in 1886. Hendrik Reijgers became the new owner. In 1897 the castle came up for auction. This was repeated in 1898, followed by an auction of the inventory.

In 1900 there was a sale of 100,000 old stones, windows, doors and 200-300 cubic metres of rough debris all from Meerwijk Castle, and on the Dieze at Engelen. It's not immediately clear which Meerwijk Castle was meant here, because it says that the goods are 'on the Dieze at Engelen', so they may have been brought there, or there might even be a mixup with Engelen Castle.

=== Huize Meerwijk and Chemical Factory Stella ===
In the early 1910s, the Castle was inhabited by a family, and called 'Huize Meerwijk'. In 1917 the buildings of Mr. Sleutjes were used for a fertilizer factory. It got the name Chemical Factory Stella. In 1920 the factory offered glue.

In the 1920s, 'Huize Meerwijk' was inhabited by a Mr. Sleutjes and later a Mr. Nico J.M. van der Velden married to Betsie J.J. Sleutjes in 1921. During World War II the Sleutjes family still lived at Huize Meerwijk.

=== The Brothel of Aunt Jet ===
The most famous period of Meerwijk Castle was when it was the Brothel of Aunt Jet (Tante Jet). Jeanne Ackermans (1928–2004) was married to Willie van de Liefvoort (d. 2003). Together they ran some bars in 's-Hertogenbosch, with her being a bartender. After 25 years of marriage they divorced in 1972, and then Aunt Jet hired Meerwijk Castle. There she primarily received customers interested in hashish. She also started to organize a line to smuggle drugs from Morocco. In the night life of 's-Hertogenbosch she recruited people to transport the hashish, but by 1974 8 people working for her were rotting in Spanish jails. That year she was caught with 12 kg in her car, but in the Netherlands this only led to a few months in jail.

In jail Aunt Jet acquainted some prostitutes and conceived the plan to found a luxury brothel in Meerwijk Castle. It became an over the top success, with a 500 guilder entrance fee. Fats Domino, Bill Haley & His Comets and Roy Orbison all performed at Meerwijk Castle. The pornographic movie Brabantse nachten zijn nat (Brabant nights are wet) was recorded at the castle. In the 1990s the brothel was closed due to new legislation.

=== The Bosma's ===
In 2006, Timo en Sabrina Bosma bought Meerwijk Castle. After trying to sell it for some years, they filled up the swimming pool and made it a location for weddings, parties and business meetings. In 2018 Meerwijk Castle was opened for private parties.

== Bibliography ==
- Erfgoed 's-Hertogenbosch (2019), Portretten van burgemeestersechtpaar Van Thije Hannes [Portraits of Mayor couple Van Thije Hannes], Erfgoed 's-Hertogenbosch
- Geerts, Bertie; Gruben, Rob (2019), Meerwijk : Buitenleven aan de Dieskant [Meerwijk: Country Life at Dieskant], Heemkundekring Angrisa
- Gotink, Bart (2018), In een bootje naar je bruiloft op Kasteel Meerwijk: pand klaar voor besloten feesten [In a boat to your wedding at Meerwijk Castle: building ready for private parties], Brabants Dagblad
- Kriele, Paul (2018), Pagina met Van de Liefvoort, zakelijk en privé [Pages about Van de Liefvoort, business and private], Bastion Oranje
- Van der Meijden, Domien (2019), Het idee een bordeel te beginnen bij Meerwijk ontstond in de bak [The idea to start a brothel in Meerwijk was conceived in jail], Brabants Dagblad
- De Mooij, Charles (1993), "Een gezicht op Meerwijk uit 1842" [A view on Meerwijk from 1842] (PDF), Bossche Bladen, Bossche Bladen
