= Jaap Bekker =

South African rugby union player

- Full name: Hendrik Petrus Jordaan Bekker
- Born: 11 February 1925 Dordrecht, South Africa
- Died: 6 August 1999 (aged 74) Pretoria, South Africa

Rugby union career
- Position: Prop
International career
Years	Team	Apps	(Points)
1952–56	South Africa	15	(3)

Hendrik Petrus Jordaan Bekker (11 February 1925 — 6 August 1999) was a South African rugby union international.

Born in Dordrecht, Bekker was the eldest of three brothers to play for the Springboks. Another brother, Daniel Bekker, was a two-time Olympic medalist in boxing. He also had a sister who was a national record holder for shot put.

Bekker was capped in 15 Test matches for the Springboks, debuting against England at Twickenham in 1952. A prop, he appeared in all six Tests for the Springboks on the 1956 tour of Australia and New Zealand, including a match up against All Blacks enforcer Kevin Skinner which left him bloodied. He announced his retirement in 1957.

== See also ==
- List of South Africa national rugby union players
