= Leslie Davies =

Leslie Davies may refer to:

- Les Davies, Welsh footballer
- Leslie Davies (rugby union), Welsh rugby union player
- L. P. Davies (Leslie Purnell Davies), British novelist
