= Dill Johnson =

Wales international rugby union player

- Full name: William Dillwyn Johnson
- Born: 5 December 1923 Pontarddulais, Wales
- Died: 22 August 2007 (aged 83) Morriston, Wales
- Height: 6 ft 2 in (188 cm)

Rugby union career
- Position: Wing-forward
International career
Years	Team	Apps	(Points)
1953	Wales	1	(0)

William Dillwyn Johnson (5 December 1923 — 22 August 2007) was a Welsh international rugby union player.

== Biography ==
Born in Pontarddulais, Johnson was 6 ft 2 in Swansea wing-forward, known for his try-scoring abilities. He scored tries against all of southern hemisphere touring sides, the All Blacks in 1945, Wallabies in 1947 and Springboks in 1952.

Johnson, a Swansea police officer, made his solitary Wales appearance as one of six new caps introduced for their 1953 Five Nations opener against England at Cardiff Arms Park, a match they lost.

As a British Police player, Johnson once scored a try within eight-seconds, against Devon County at Torquay.

== See also ==
- List of Wales national rugby union players
