= N. Glyn Davies =

Welsh rugby player (1927–2023)

- Full name: Neville Glyn Davies
- Born: 29 November 1927 Cefn Fforest, Wales
- Died: 20 November 2023 (aged 95)
- Height: 6 ft 3 in (191 cm)
- Occupation: School master

Rugby union career
- Position: Flanker
International career
Years	Team	Apps	(Points)
1955	Wales	1	(0)

Neville Glyn Davies (29 November 1927 – 20 November 2023) was a Welsh international rugby union player.

Born in Cefn Fforest, Davies attended Lewis School, Pengam, and Bedwellty Grammar School. He undertook further studies at Cardiff University and excelled in multiple sports during these years. This included representing Wales as a basketball player, as well as trials for the British team to contest the 1948 Summer Olympics in London. He was also a Welsh Universities heavyweight boxing champion.

Davies, known ironically by the nickname "Shorty", was a tall back row forward in rugby. His first national call up came in 1953-54, when he was selected from Blackheath to play for Wales against the touring All Blacks, only to suffer a back injury in training which forced him out of the side. He did however have the distinction of captaining Southern Counties against the All Blacks in the New Zealand team's opening tour fixture. After joining London Welsh, Davies gained his solitary Wales cap in 1955, as a member of the team which defeated England at Cardiff.

== See also ==
- List of Wales national rugby union players
