= Ron Evans (rugby union) =

- Full name: Ronald Evans
- Born: 6 November 1941 Bridgend, Wales
- Died: 10 March 2023 (aged 81)

Rugby union career
- Position: Centre
International career
| Years | Team | Apps | (Points) |
| 1963 | Wales | 3 | (0) |

Ronald Evans (6 November 1941 — March 2023) was a Welsh international rugby union player.

Born in Bridgend, Evans attended Tondu Junior School and Bryncethin Secondary School, where he was a prefect. He was a product of the Bryncethin Youth team and played his early senior rugby with Neath.

Evans, an attacking centre and skilled drop goal exponent, scored 18 tries in his first season with Bridgend in 1961/62. He made three appearances for Wales in the 1963 Five Nations, debuting against Scotland at Murrayfield. A policeman by profession, Evans was rugby captain of Glamorgan County Police and had a 440-point season for the team in 1966/67.

== See also ==
- List of Wales national rugby union players
