= Dick Jones (rugby union, born 1906) =

- Full name: Richard Jones
- Born: 5 January 1906 Shanghai, China
- Died: 18 January 1986 (aged 80) Folkestone, Kent , England
- School: Bedford School

Rugby union career
- Position: Wing–forward
International career
Years	Team	Apps	(Points)
1929	Wales	1	(0)

Richard Jones (5 January 1906 – 18 January 1986) was a Welsh international rugby union player.

Jones was born to a Japanese mother in Shanghai, China. He attended Bedford School and was also based in England for his rugby, playing with London Welsh. His elder brother Bobby was capped for Wales. Another brother Jack was a London Welsh teammate and he also had a brother who represented East Midlands.

In 1929, Jones gained his solitary Wales cap against England at Twickenham.

== See also ==
- List of Wales national rugby union players
