= David Morgan (rugby union, born 1863) =

Wales international rugby union player

- Born: 2 March 1863 Llanwrda, Wales
- Died: 20 February 1920 (aged 56) Swansea, Wales

Rugby union career
- Position: Forward
International career
Years	Team	Apps	(Points)
1885–89	Wales	7	(0)

David Morgan (2 March 1863 — 20 February 1920) was a Welsh international rugby union player.

Born in Llanwrda, Carmarthenshire, Morgan was a Swansea RFC forward, capped seven times for Wales over four Home Nations campaigns during the 1880s, which included a win over Ireland.

Morgan died of gastric catarrh and heart failure in 1920.

== See also ==
- List of Wales national rugby union players
