= Gethin Thomas =

- Full name: Samuel Gethin Thomas
- Born: 24 April 1897 Llwynhendy, Wales
- Died: 1 February 1939 (aged 41) Westminster, England

Rugby union career
- Position: Lock
International career
Years	Team	Apps	(Points)
1923	Wales	4	(0)

Samuel Gethin Thomas (24 April 1897 — 1 February 1939) was a Welsh international rugby union player.

A native of Llwynhendy, Thomas was active in rugby union for Llanelly post World War I, during which he had been mentioned in dispatches serving with the 4th Battalion, Welch Regiment. His brother Ewart also played for Llanelly.

Thomas, a forward, gained his four Wales caps in 1923, playing all possible matches of that year's Five Nations Championship, with his debut coming against England at Twickenham Stadium.

Having retired from rugby due to ill health, Thomas died aged 41 in 1939, after undergoing an operation at London's Westminster Hospital. He was married, with a son and daughter.

== See also ==
- List of Wales national rugby union players
