= Cecil Davies =

- Full name: Cecil Rhys Davies
- Born: 12 September 1909 Pontypridd, Wales
- Died: 24 December 1941 (aged 32) over Brittany, France

Rugby union career
- Position: Prop
International career
Years	Team	Apps	(Points)
1934	Wales	1	(0)

Cecil Rhys Davies (12 September 1909 — 24 December 1941) was a Welsh international rugby union player.

Born in Pontypridd, Davies was a Welsh Secondary Schools representative player. He played his rugby for Cardiff and also spent part of his career in England, turning out for Bedford when based at RAF Henlow. In 1934, Davies was one of 13 new players introduced by Wales for their Home Nations opener against England in Cardiff, playing as a prop.

Davies served as a squadron leader with the 224 Squadron of the Royal Air Force during World War II. While on patrol over the Bay of Biscay on 24 December 1941, Davies and his squadron were killed when their plane crashed in Brittany. He was the first of three ex-Welsh players to die on active service in World War II and is buried in Bayeux cemetery.

== See also ==
- List of Wales national rugby union players
