= Cyril Roberts =

Wales international rugby union player

- Full name: Cyril Richard Roberts
- Born: 19 December 1930 Neath, Wales
- Died: 19 June 2017 (aged 86) Neath, Wales

Rugby union career
- Position: Wing
International career
Years	Team	Apps	(Points)
1958	Wales	2	(3)

Cyril Richard Roberts (19 December 1930 — 19 June 2017) was a Welsh international rugby union player.

Born in Neath, Roberts was a Wales Schoolboys representative, like his father, and the first Wales international produced by Bryncoch RFC. He later played for Briton Ferry, before joining Neath RFC in 1953–54. In his seven seasons with Neath, Roberts scored a total of 91 tries, including 21 in the 1956–57 season.

Roberts gained two Wales caps in the 1958 Five Nations, scoring a try on debut against Ireland at Lansdowne Road, as the Welsh came back from a 0–6 deficit to win with three second-half tries. His other cap came in the following fixture against France at Cardiff Arms Road, a 6–16 loss which ensured only England could win the championship.

== See also ==
- List of Wales national rugby union players
