= Dan Jones (rugby union, born 1907) =

Welsh international rugby union player (1907–1988)

- Full name: Daniel Jones
- Born: 2 March 1907 Neath Abbey, Wales
- Died: 31 October 1988 (aged 81) Neath Abbey, Wales
- Height: 6 ft (183 cm)
- Weight: 12 st (168 lb; 76 kg)

Rugby union career
- Position: Wing
International career
Years	Team	Apps	(Points)
1927	Wales	1	(0)

Daniel Jones (2 March 1907 – 31 October 1988) was a Welsh international rugby union player.

A wing three–quarter, Jones was known for his pace and also excelled in athletics events.

Jones scored a record 73 tries in his first season with Neath and was a Welsh trialist on several occasions. He was capped once for Wales, earning a place on the right wing against New South Wales in 1927–28.

== See also ==
- List of Wales national rugby union players
