= Dai Jones (rugby union) =

- Full name: David Charles Jenkin Jones
- Born: 30 April 1916 Morriston, Wales
- Died: 20 February 2000 (aged 83) Swansea, Wales
- Weight: 14 st (196 lb; 89 kg)

Rugby union career
- Position: Prop
International career
Years	Team	Apps	(Points)
1947–49	Wales	7	(0)

David Charles Jenkin Jones (30 April 1916 – 20 February 2000) was a Welsh international rugby union player.

Jones was the son of a local businessman in Morriston.

A sturdy front-row forward, Jones played for Swansea and was his club's only representative in the Welsh XV when he debuted in 1947. He remained with the national side for two further seasons and gained a total of seven caps.

== See also ==
- List of Wales national rugby union players
