= Viv Law =

- Full name: Vivian John Law
- Born: 11 June 1910 Cardiff, Wales
- Died: 22 April 1989 (aged 78) Newport, Wales

Rugby union career
- Position: Prop
International career
Years	Team	Apps	(Points)
1939	Wales	1	(0)

Vivian John Law (11 June 1910 – 22 April 1989) was a Welsh international rugby union player.

Law was born to Irish parents in Cardiff and picked up rugby at Newport High School.

A strong scrummaging forward, Law debuted for Newport RFC in 1932 and took over the captaincy in the 1937–38 season. His family background meant he was initially pursued by Ireland, but he was unable to impress at trials. He instead gained his solitary international cap for Wales, playing against Ireland in 1939.

Law served as chairman of Newport RFC.

== See also ==
- List of Wales national rugby union players
