= Jim Burns (rugby union) =

- Full name: James Burns
- Born: 22 March 1899 Cardiff, Wales
- Died: 25 July 1971 (aged 72) Cardiff, Wales

Rugby union career
- Position: Prop
International career
Years	Team	Apps	(Points)
1927	Wales	2	(0)

James Burns (22 March 1899 – 25 July 1971) was a Welsh international rugby union player.

Burns was a strong–scrummaging Cardiff forward, capped twice for Wales in 1927. He made his international debut in a win over France at Swansea and also featured against Ireland at Lansdowne Road.

A publican, Burns was at the time of his Wales caps running a public house previously owned by Jim Driscoll's widow. The boxer had been a relative of his (either a cousin or uncle, depending on the source).

== See also ==
- List of Wales national rugby union players
