= Stan Davies (rugby union) =

- Full name: Henry Stanley Davies
- Born: 23 April 1895 Ystrad, Wales
- Died: 14 February 1966 (aged 70) Ystrad, Wales

Rugby union career
- Position: Prop
International career
Years	Team	Apps	(Points)
1923	Wales	1	(0)

Henry Stanley Davies (23 April 1895 – 14 February 1966) was a Welsh international rugby union player.

A forward, Davies was a product of Treherbert RFC. He also competed with Cardiff and Penygraig. At representative level, Davies captained Glamorgan and in 1923 was capped for Wales against Ireland at Lansdowne Road. He received no further caps, but was an international reserve five times.

Davies served in France during World War I and received a commission while in the field. By the end of the war, Davies was serving in Palestine. He was a teacher by profession and held the headmaster position at Tonypandy Junior School. In World War II, Davies served as a Home Guard commander.

== See also ==
- List of Wales national rugby union players
