= William Ould =

- Full name: William John Ould
- Born: 6 May 1899 Glyncorrwg, Wales
- Died: 19 October 1960 (aged 61) Cardiff, Wales

Rugby union career
- Position: Forward
International career
Years	Team	Apps	(Points)
1924	Wales	2	(0)

William John Ould (6 May 1899 — 19 October 1960) was a Welsh international rugby union player.

== Biography ==
Born in Glyncorrwg, Ould was versatile player who was primarily a wing-forward, but could play every position except fullback, while also being a capable goalkicker. He began playing for Cardiff RFC in 1923–24 and in his first season at the club earned his two Wales caps, as a forward against England and Scotland during the 1924 Five Nations. In 1925, Ould rebuffed a £500 offer to sign with rugby league club Leeds.

Ould was a policeman by profession.

== See also ==
- List of Wales national rugby union players
