= Viv Evans =

- Full name: Vivian Evans
- Born: 14 June 1919 Skewen, Wales
- Died: 1 April 1995 (aged 75) Neath, Wales

Rugby union career
- Position: Fullback
International career
| Years | Team | Apps | (Points) |
| 1954 | Wales | 3 | (25) |

Vivian Evans (14 June 1919 — 1 April 1995) was a Welsh international rugby union player.

== Biography ==
A native of Skewen, Evans was known widely by the nickname "Snowball".

Evans was a merchant seaman and after getting captured during World War II spent four years in a German prisoner of war camp. Demobilised from the Navy in 1945, Evans had an offer to join association football club Torquay United, having played the sport as a youth and while a prisoner, but opted instead to play rugby with Neath.

A fullback, Evans gained a Wales call up during the 1954 Five Nations, replacing Gerwyn Williams after their loss to England in the opening fixture. He earned plaudits for his debut performance against Ireland at Lansdowne Road and scored 25-points off his boot from his three appearances, all as part of winning teams, to help Wales secure a share of the title with England and France.

== See also ==
- List of Wales national rugby union players
