= Ernie Coleman (rugby union) =

Wales international rugby union player

- Full name: Ernest Owain Coleman
- Born: 3 November 1917 Newport, Wales
- Died: 24 October 1999 (aged 81) Newport, Wales
- Height: 5 ft 11 in (180 cm)
- Weight: 13.8 st (193 lb; 88 kg)
- School: Maindee School

Rugby union career
- Position: Prop
International career
Years	Team	Apps	(Points)
1949	Wales	3	(0)

Ernest Owain Coleman (3 November 1917 – 24 October 1999) was a Welsh international rugby union player.

A native of Newport, Coleman was educated at Maindee School and made up way up from the Newport RFC juniors to make his senior debut aged 18 in 1936. His career was soon interrupted by World War II, during which he served in the British Army with many of his teammates. He continued to play rugby in this period, for Southern Command, Welsh Services and also in a representative match for the Army against Ireland.

Coleman, a tireless forward, had to wait until the age of 31 to gain a Wales cap. He was capped three times in the 1949 Five Nations, debuting in a win over England, but was thereafter overlooked.

== See also ==
- List of Wales national rugby union players
