= Dai Davies (rugby union, born 1897) =

- Full name: David George Davies
- Born: 1 August 1897 Clydey, Wales
- Died: 8 April 1964 (aged 66) Coventry, England
- Occupation: Builder

Rugby union career
- Position: Forward
International career
Years	Team	Apps	(Points)
1923	Wales	2	(0)

David George Davies (1 August 1897 – 8 April 1964) was a Welsh international rugby union player.

A forward, Davies played his rugby for Cardiff and was capped twice for Wales during the 1923 Five Nations. He made his debut against England at Twickenham and finished the match with a bandaged face after getting his cheek cut open by an opponent's boot. The injury caused him to miss a match for Glamorgan, but he recovered in time for the next Wales fixture, against Scotland at Cardiff Arms Park.

Davies settled in Coventry at the end of his rugby career and co–founded a building business.

== See also ==
- List of Wales national rugby union players
