= List of Wales national rugby union players =

List of Wales national rugby union players is a list of players who have represented Wales at rugby union. The list only includes players who have played in a Test match for the senior men's team. The players are listed in order of chronological appearance for the national team. Players that were first capped during the same match are listed in order of those that began in the starting line up before replacements and then in alphabetical order by surname.

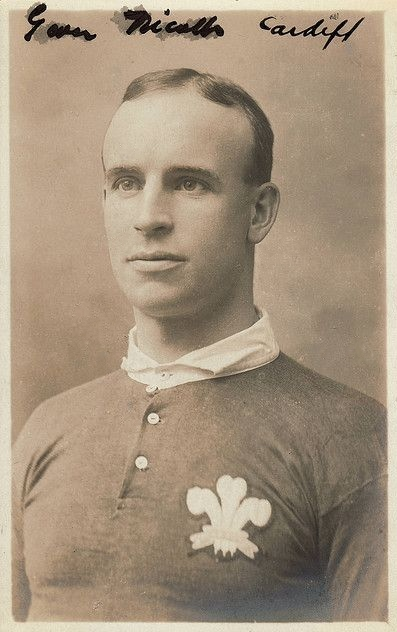
International Rugby Hall of Fame inductee Gwyn Nicholls played 24 Tests for Wales between 1896 and 1906.

Ten former Welsh internationals from the Wales national rugby union team have been inducted into the International Rugby Hall of Fame, while eight have been inducted into the World Rugby Hall of Fame. One Welsh player, Shane Williams in 2008, has been awarded World Rugby Player of the Year (formerly known as the International Rugby Board Player of the Year).

== 1880s – 1950s ==
Somerset-born Frank Hancock, a 2011 inductee into the World Rugby Hall of Fame, changed the game of rugby when he was played as a fourth three-quarter for Cardiff. When given the captaincy of Wales in 1886 he trialed the system against Scotland, the very first international match to see four three-quarters play. Although the system was abandoned during the match, it was readopted by Wales in 1888 and was quickly absorbed by the other Home Nation countries. It is now the standard formation in world rugby.

Known as the "Prince of three-quarters", Gwyn Nicholls played 24 Tests for Wales at centre between 1896 and 1906. He was the only Welsh player in the British Isles team of 1899, and was the star for Wales during their first golden era. Not only did he captain Wales to three Triple Crowns, but also led them to their famous victory over the All Blacks in 1905. On 26 December 1949, gates bearing his name at Cardiff Arms Park were officially opened.

Bleddyn Williams and Jack Matthews, both centres who were inducted into the World Rugby Hall of Fame in 2013, were called by World Rugby "a uniquely complementary and successful partnership at club, national team and Lions levels after the Second World War". Both captained Cardiff and Wales, made their international debuts in 1947, and were on the Lions squad that toured Australia and New Zealand in 1950. Williams, nicknamed the "Prince of Centres", earned 22 caps for Wales and five for the Lions in an eight-year Test career. Wales won all five Tests in which he served as captain; at the time of his induction, he was the only Wales captain with a 100% winning record. Williams went on to become a prominent rugby commentator. Matthews, renowned for his strong tackling, earned 17 caps for Wales and six for the Lions, calling time on his Test career in 1951. After his playing career, he became the Lions' first team doctor, serving in that role during the 1980 tour to South Africa.

Named the greatest Welsh player of the 1950s by the WRU, Cliff Morgan played 29 Tests for Wales, and four for the British Lions between 1951 and 1958. Morgan played at fly-half and was one of the sport's biggest crowd-pullers during his career. He played during Wales' Five Nations Grand Slam of 1952, and their victory over the All Blacks in 1953, but he is most famous for captaining the British Lions in South Africa in 1955. One of Morgan's great friends was Carwyn James. Although most notable for his coaching record, James appeared for Wales in two Tests in 1958. He coached the British Lions to their only series victory over New Zealand in 1971, with a team including many Welsh players. He also coached Welsh club Llanelli, and the Barbarians side that defeated the All Blacks in 1973. Despite this, he never coached Wales. Morgan, inducted into the International Rugby Hall of Fame in 1997, was further honoured with induction into the World Rugby Hall of Fame in 2009.

== 1960s – present ==
When Wales faced Australia on 3 December 1966, two future Rugby Hall of Fame members made their Test debuts; Gerald Davies and Barry John. Davies played 46 Tests for Wales between 1966 and 1978. Although he started out playing in the centre, he was moved to the wing during Wales' 1969 tour of New Zealand and Australia, and eventually scored 20 Test tries for Wales. Davies also played for the Lions during their 1968 tour of South Africa and 1971 tour of New Zealand. Barry John was also selected for the 1968 Lions' tour of South Africa. Playing at fly-half, he helped Wales to a Five Nations Grand Slam in 1971, and then the Lions to their one and only series win over the All Blacks that same year. His exploits on the Lions tour of 1971 were rewarded with the nickname of "The King" by the New Zealand press, though the pressure of expectation and fame saw him quit rugby the following year.

Widely regarded as the greatest rugby union player of all time, Gareth Edwards played 53 Tests for Wales at scrum-half between 1967 and 1978. Edwards was never dropped from the team and played all 53 of his Tests consecutively. He also played in three Lions tours; including the series victories in New Zealand in 1971, and the unbeaten tour of South Africa in 1974. Edwards won five Triple Crowns with Wales and three Five Nations Grand Slams. He also scored a try for the Barbarians against the All Blacks in 1973, remembered as "that try" and considered one of the sport's greatest. In 2003, Edwards was voted the greatest player of all time by Rugby World magazine. In 2007, Edwards earned an additional honour with his induction into the World Rugby Hall of Fame.

In 1969, three Hall of Fame members debuted for Wales; Phil Bennett, Mervyn Davies, and JPR Williams. Bennett played 29 Tests for Wales. He started out playing at fullback, but after Barry John retired, he was moved to fly-half. As well as representing Wales, he played eight Tests for the Lions and captained them on their 1977 tour of New Zealand. Mervyn Davies was known as "Merve the Swerve" and played 38 consecutive Tests for Wales between 1969 and 1976, losing only eight of them. After captaining Wales in his last nine appearances, Davies was forced to retire due to a brain haemorrhage. JPR Williams played 55 Tests for Wales between 1969 and 1981. Playing at fullback, he won three Five Nations Grand Slams with Wales in the 1970s, and captained Wales in 1979. He also toured with the British Lions in 1971 and 1974, and in 2008 a readers poll in The Telegraph voted him the greatest Lions' fullback of all time.

Ieuan Evans played for Wales between 1987 and 1998, and in the process earned 72 Welsh caps while the nation was transcending the amateur and professional eras. Playing mainly on the wing, Evans scored 33 tries for Wales, a record until surpassed by Gareth Thomas in 2004. As well as that, he was awarded seven Lions caps from the 1989, 1993 and 1997 tours.

In November 2008, Shane Williams and Ryan Jones became the first Welsh players to be nominated in a group of five players for the World Rugby Player of the Year award, first awarded in 2001. Shane Williams was duly selected as the 2008 World Rugby Player of the Year. Leigh Halfpenny was nominated in 2013 and Alun Wyn Jones in 2015 and 2019. Upon retiring in 2023, Jones set the world record for international appearances with 158 for Wales and 12 for the British & Irish Lions.

== List ==
| Number | Name | Debut opposition | Debut date | Caps | Tries | Con | Pen | Drop |
|---|---|---|---|---|---|---|---|---|
| 1 | James Bevan | England | 19 February 1881 | 1 | 0 | 0 | 0 | 0 |
| 2 | Godfrey Darbishire | England | 19 February 1881 | 1 | 0 | 0 | 0 | 0 |
| 3 | Barry Girling | England | 19 February 1881 | 1 | 0 | 0 | 0 | 0 |
| 4 | George Harding | England | 19 February 1881 | 4 | 0 | 0 | 0 | 0 |
| 5 | Edward Lewis | England | 19 February 1881 | 1 | 0 | 0 | 0 | 0 |
| 6 | Bathurst Mann | England | 19 February 1881 | 1 | 0 | 0 | 0 | 0 |
| 7 | Charlie Newman | England | 19 February 1881 | 10 | 0 | 0 | 0 | 0 |
| 8 | Edward Peake | England | 19 February 1881 | 1 | 0 | 0 | 0 | 0 |
| 9 | William David Phillips | England | 19 February 1881 | 5 | 0 | 0 | 0 | 0 |
| 10 | Frank Purdon | England | 19 February 1881 | 4 | 0 | 0 | 0 | 0 |
| 11 | Aneurin Rees | England | 19 February 1881 | 1 | 0 | 0 | 0 | 0 |
| 12 | Richard Summers | England | 19 February 1881 | 1 | 0 | 0 | 0 | 0 |
| 13 | Edward Treharne | England | 19 February 1881 | 2 | 0 | 0 | 0 | 0 |
| 14 | Leonard Watkins | England | 19 February 1881 | 1 | 0 | 0 | 0 | 0 |
| 15 | Richard Williams | England | 19 February 1881 | 1 | 0 | 0 | 0 | 0 |
| 16 | Thomas Baker-Jones | Ireland | 28 January 1882 | 6 | 1 | 0 | 0 | 0 |
| 17 | James Bridie | Ireland | 28 January 1882 | 1 | 1 | 0 | 0 | 0 |
| 18 | Tom Clapp | Ireland | 28 January 1882 | 14 | 2 | 0 | 0 | 0 |
| 19 | Samuel Clark | Ireland | 28 January 1882 | 2 | 0 | 0 | 0 | 0 |
| 20 | Bill Evans | Ireland | 28 January 1882 | 2 | 1 | 0 | 0 | 0 |
| 21 | Bob Gould | Ireland | 28 January 1882 | 11 | 0 | 0 | 0 | 0 |
| 22 | Charles Lewis | Ireland | 28 January 1882 | 5 | 0 | 4 | 0 | 0 |
| 23 | George Morris | Ireland | 28 January 1882 | 5 | 0 | 0 | 0 | 0 |
| 24 | William Norton | Ireland | 28 January 1882 | 6 | 1 | 0 | 0 | 0 |
| 25 | Hugh Vincent | Ireland | 28 January 1882 | 1 | 0 | 0 | 0 | 0 |
| 26 | Tom Williams | Ireland | 28 January 1882 | 1 | 0 | 0 | 0 | 0 |
| 27 | Harry Bowen | England | 16 December 1882 | 4 | 0 | 0 | 0 | 0 |
| 28 | Alfred Cattell | England | 16 December 1882 | 2 | 0 | 0 | 0 | 0 |
| 29 | James Clare | England | 16 December 1882 | 1 | 0 | 0 | 0 | 0 |
| 30 | David Gwynn | England | 16 December 1882 | 2 | 0 | 0 | 0 | 0 |
| 31 | Thomas Judson | England | 16 December 1882 | 2 | 1 | 0 | 0 | 0 |
| 32 | John Griffin | Scotland | 8 January 1883 | 1 | 0 | 0 | 0 | 0 |
| 33 | Arthur Jones | Scotland | 8 January 1883 | 1 | 0 | 0 | 0 | 0 |
| 34 | Horace Lyne | Scotland | 8 January 1883 | 5 | 0 | 0 | 0 | 0 |
| 35 | Charles Allen | England | 5 January 1884 | 2 | 1 | 0 | 0 | 0 |
| 36 | Fred Andrews | England | 5 January 1884 | 2 | 0 | 0 | 0 | 0 |
| 37 | William Gwynn | England | 5 January 1884 | 5 | 0 | 0 | 0 | 0 |
| 38 | Frederick Margrave | England | 5 January 1884 | 2 | 0 | 0 | 0 | 0 |
| 39 | Joe Simpson | England | 5 January 1884 | 3 | 0 | 0 | 0 | 0 |
| 40 | John Smith | England | 5 January 1884 | 3 | 0 | 0 | 0 | 0 |
| 41 | Charles Taylor | England | 5 January 1884 | 9 | 0 | 0 | 0 | 0 |
| 42 | Tom Barlow | Ireland | 12 April 1884 | 1 | 0 | 0 | 0 | 0 |
| 43 | Samuel Goldsworthy | Ireland | 12 April 1884 | 3 | 0 | 0 | 0 | 0 |
| 44 | Frank Hancock | Ireland | 12 April 1884 | 4 | 0 | 0 | 0 | 0 |
| 45 | John Hinton | Ireland | 12 April 1884 | 1 | 0 | 0 | 0 | 0 |
| 46 | Buckley Roderick | Ireland | 12 April 1884 | 1 | 0 | 0 | 0 | 0 |
| 47 | William Stadden | Ireland | 12 April 1884 | 8 | 2 | 0 | 0 | 1 |
| 48 | Arthur Gould | England | 3 January 1885 | 27 | 4 | 1 | 0 | 2 |
| 49 | Martyn Jordan | England | 3 January 1885 | 3 | 2 | 0 | 0 | 0 |
| 50 | Evan Richards | England | 3 January 1885 | 2 | 0 | 0 | 0 | 0 |
| 51 | Ernest Rowland | England | 3 January 1885 | 1 | 0 | 0 | 0 | 0 |
| 52 | Lewis Cobden Thomas | England | 3 January 1885 | 2 | 0 | 0 | 0 | 0 |
| 53 | Edward Alexander | Scotland | 10 January 1885 | 5 | 0 | 0 | 0 | 0 |
| 54 | Frank Hill | Scotland | 10 January 1885 | 15 | 0 | 0 | 0 | 0 |
| 55 | David Morgan | Scotland | 10 January 1885 | 7 | 1 | 0 | 0 | 0 |
| 56 | Willie Thomas | Scotland | 10 January 1885 | 11 | 0 | 0 | 0 | 0 |
| 57 | William Bowen | England | 2 January 1886 | 13 | 0 | 0 | 0 | 0 |
| 58 | Billy Douglas | England | 2 January 1886 | 4 | 0 | 0 | 0 | 0 |
| 59 | Dai Lewis | England | 2 January 1886 | 2 | 0 | 0 | 0 | 0 |
| 60 | Evan Roberts | England | 2 January 1886 | 2 | 0 | 0 | 0 | 0 |
| 61 | George Avery Young | England | 2 January 1886 | 2 | 0 | 0 | 0 | 0 |
| 62 | Alfred Mathews | Scotland | 9 January 1886 | 1 | 0 | 0 | 0 | 0 |
| 63 | Alexander Bland | England | 8 January 1887 | 9 | 0 | 0 | 0 | 0 |
| 64 | Jem Evans | England | 8 January 1887 | 4 | 0 | 0 | 0 | 0 |
| 65 | Albert Hybart | England | 8 January 1887 | 1 | 0 | 0 | 0 | 0 |
| 66 | Thomas William Lockwood | England | 8 January 1887 | 3 | 0 | 0 | 0 | 0 |
| 67 | George Bowen | Scotland | 26 February 1887 | 4 | 0 | 0 | 0 | 0 |
| 68 | Sawdust Hughes | Scotland | 26 February 1887 | 2 | 0 | 0 | 0 | 0 |
| 69 | William Williams | Scotland | 26 February 1887 | 5 | 0 | 0 | 0 | 0 |
| 70 | John Goulstone Lewis | Ireland | 12 March 1887 | 1 | 0 | 0 | 0 | 0 |
| 71 | William Towers | Ireland | 12 March 1887 | 2 | 1 | 0 | 0 | 0 |
| 72 | William Howell | Scotland | 4 February 1888 | 2 | 0 | 0 | 0 | 0 |
| 73 | Thomas Pryce-Jenkins | Scotland | 4 February 1888 | 2 | 1 | 0 | 0 | 0 |
| 74 | Dick Kedzlie | Scotland | 4 February 1888 | 2 | 0 | 0 | 0 | 0 |
| 75 | John Meredith | Scotland | 4 February 1888 | 4 | 0 | 0 | 0 | 0 |
| 76 | Dick Powell | Scotland | 4 February 1888 | 2 | 0 | 0 | 0 | 0 |
| 77 | Ned Roberts | Scotland | 4 February 1888 | 3 | 0 | 0 | 0 | 0 |
| 78 | T. Williams | Scotland | 4 February 1888 | 2 | 0 | 0 | 0 | 0 |
| 79 | Charlie Arthur | Ireland | 3 March 1888 | 3 | 0 | 0 | 0 | 0 |
| 80 | Charlie Thomas | Ireland | 3 March 1888 | 9 | 1 | 0 | 0 | 0 |
| 81 | Norman Biggs | New Zealand Natives | 22 December 1888 | 8 | 2 | 0 | 0 | 0 |
| 82 | Dickie Garrett | New Zealand Natives | 22 December 1888 | 8 | 0 | 0 | 0 | 0 |
| 83 | Dan Griffiths | New Zealand Natives | 22 December 1888 | 2 | 0 | 0 | 0 | 0 |
| 84 | Jim Hannan | New Zealand Natives | 22 December 1888 | 19 | 2 | 0 | 0 | 0 |
| 85 | Theo Harding | New Zealand Natives | 22 December 1888 | 3 | 0 | 0 | 0 | 0 |
| 86 | Sydney Nicholls | New Zealand Natives | 22 December 1888 | 4 | 0 | 0 | 0 | 0 |
| 87 | George Thomas | New Zealand Natives | 22 December 1888 | 3 | 0 | 0 | 0 | 0 |
| 88 | Jim Webb | New Zealand Natives | 22 December 1888 | 2 | 0 | 0 | 0 | 0 |
| 89 | Teddy Bishop | Scotland | 2 February 1889 | 1 | 0 | 0 | 0 | 0 |
| 90 | David William Evans | Scotland | 2 February 1889 | 5 | 0 | 0 | 0 | 0 |
| 91 | Rosser Evans | Scotland | 2 February 1889 | 1 | 0 | 0 | 0 | 0 |
| 92 | Rowley Thomas | Scotland | 2 February 1889 | 7 | 0 | 0 | 0 | 0 |
| 93 | Abel Davies | Ireland | 2 March 1889 | 1 | 0 | 0 | 0 | 0 |
| 94 | Giotto Griffiths | Ireland | 2 March 1889 | 1 | 0 | 0 | 0 | 0 |
| 95 | Tom Morgan | Ireland | 2 March 1889 | 1 | 0 | 0 | 0 | 0 |
| 96 | Billy Bancroft | Scotland | 1 February 1890 | 33 | 0 | 20 | 4 | 1 |
| 97 | Evan James | Scotland | 1 February 1890 | 5 | 0 | 0 | 0 | 0 |
| 98 | Percy Lloyd | Scotland | 1 February 1890 | 4 | 0 | 0 | 0 | 0 |
| 99 | Walter Rice Evans | Scotland | 1 February 1890 | 3 | 0 | 0 | 0 | 0 |
| 100 | Stephen Thomas | Scotland | 1 February 1890 | 3 | 0 | 0 | 0 | 0 |
| 101 | Tom Graham | Ireland | 1 March 1890 | 12 | 1 | 0 | 0 | 0 |
| 102 | Hugh Ingledew | Ireland | 1 March 1890 | 3 | 0 | 0 | 0 | 0 |
| 103 | Percy Bennett | England | 3 January 1891 | 4 | 0 | 0 | 0 | 0 |
| 104 | Harry Packer | England | 3 January 1891 | 7 | 0 | 0 | 0 | 0 |
| 105 | Tom Pearson | England | 3 January 1891 | 13 | 4 | 0 | 0 | 0 |
| 106 | Edward Pegge | England | 3 January 1891 | 1 | 0 | 0 | 0 | 0 |
| 107 | David Daniel | Scotland | 7 February 1891 | 8 | 0 | 0 | 0 | 0 |
| 108 | William McCutcheon | Scotland | 7 February 1891 | 7 | 1 | 0 | 0 | 0 |
| 109 | Ralph Sweet-Escott | Scotland | 7 February 1891 | 3 | 0 | 0 | 0 | 0 |
| 110 | Tom Deacon | Ireland | 7 March 1891 | 4 | 0 | 0 | 0 | 0 |
| 111 | David James | Ireland | 7 March 1891 | 4 | 0 | 0 | 0 | 0 |
| 112 | Boomer Nicholl | Ireland | 7 March 1891 | 15 | 0 | 0 | 0 | 0 |
| 113 | David Samuel | Ireland | 7 March 1891 | 2 | 1 | 0 | 0 | 0 |
| 114 | John Samuel | Ireland | 7 March 1891 | 1 | 0 | 0 | 0 | 0 |
| 115 | Arthur Boucher | England | 2 January 1892 | 13 | 1 | 0 | 0 | 0 |
| 116 | Frank Mills | England | 2 January 1892 | 13 | 0 | 0 | 0 | 0 |
| 117 | Percy Phillips | England | 2 January 1892 | 6 | 0 | 0 | 0 | 0 |
| 118 | George Rowles | England | 2 January 1892 | 1 | 0 | 0 | 0 | 0 |
| 119 | Wallace Watts | England | 2 January 1892 | 12 | 0 | 0 | 0 | 0 |
| 120 | Conway Rees | Scotland | 6 February 1892 | 3 | 0 | 0 | 0 | 0 |
| 121 | Harry Day | Ireland | 5 March 1892 | 5 | 0 | 0 | 0 | 0 |
| 122 | Bert Gould | Ireland | 5 March 1892 | 3 | 2 | 0 | 0 | 0 |
| 123 | Frederick Nicholls | Ireland | 5 March 1892 | 1 | 0 | 0 | 0 | 0 |
| 124 | Fred Parfitt | England | 7 January 1893 | 9 | 1 | 0 | 0 | 0 |
| 125 | Dai Fitzgerald | Scotland | 3 February 1894 | 2 | 1 | 0 | 0 | 1 |
| 126 | William Llewellyn Thomas | Scotland | 3 February 1894 | 3 | 0 | 0 | 0 | 0 |
| 127 | Jack Elliott | Ireland | 10 March 1894 | 3 | 0 | 0 | 0 | 0 |
| 128 | Fred Hutchinson | Ireland | 10 March 1894 | 3 | 0 | 0 | 0 | 0 |
| 129 | David Nicholl | Ireland | 10 March 1894 | 1 | 0 | 0 | 0 | 0 |
| 130 | Owen Badger | England | 5 January 1895 | 4 | 0 | 0 | 0 | 0 |
| 131 | Selwyn Biggs | England | 5 January 1895 | 9 | 0 | 0 | 0 | 0 |
| 132 | Ben Davies | England | 5 January 1895 | 2 | 0 | 0 | 0 | 0 |
| 133 | William Elsey | England | 5 January 1895 | 1 | 1 | 0 | 0 | 0 |
| 134 | Tom Jackson | England | 5 January 1895 | 1 | 0 | 0 | 0 | 0 |
| 135 | Ernie George | Scotland | 26 January 1895 | 3 | 0 | 0 | 0 | 0 |
| 136 | Evan Lloyd | Scotland | 26 January 1895 | 1 | 0 | 0 | 0 | 0 |
| 137 | Tom Pook | Scotland | 26 January 1895 | 1 | 0 | 0 | 0 | 0 |
| 138 | Albert Jenkin | Ireland | 16 March 1895 | 2 | 0 | 0 | 0 | 0 |
| 139 | David Morgan | Ireland | 16 March 1895 | 2 | 0 | 0 | 0 | 0 |
| 140 | Cliff Bowen | England | 4 January 1896 | 4 | 1 | 0 | 0 | 0 |
| 141 | Bert Dauncey | England | 4 January 1896 | 3 | 0 | 0 | 0 | 0 |
| 142 | Sam Ramsey | England | 4 January 1896 | 2 | 0 | 0 | 0 | 0 |
| 143 | William Cope | Scotland | 25 January 1896 | 1 | 0 | 0 | 0 | 0 |
| 144 | Barry Davies | Scotland | 25 January 1896 | 1 | 0 | 0 | 0 | 0 |
| 145 | Dai Evans | Scotland | 25 January 1896 | 4 | 0 | 0 | 0 | 0 |
| 146 | Jack Evans | Scotland | 25 January 1896 | 3 | 0 | 0 | 0 | 0 |
| 147 | Bill Morris | Scotland | 25 January 1896 | 3 | 0 | 0 | 0 | 0 |
| 148 | Gwyn Nicholls | Scotland | 25 January 1896 | 24 | 3 | 0 | 0 | 1 |
| 149 | Llewellyn Lloyd | Ireland | 14 March 1896 | 12 | 3 | 0 | 0 | 0 |
| 150 | Fred Miller | Ireland | 14 March 1896 | 7 | 0 | 0 | 0 | 0 |
| 151 | Fred Cornish | England | 9 January 1897 | 4 | 0 | 0 | 0 | 0 |
| 152 | Dick Hellings | England | 9 January 1897 | 9 | 1 | 0 | 0 | 0 |
| 153 | Daniel Jones | England | 9 January 1897 | 1 | 1 | 0 | 0 | 0 |
| 154 | Jack Rhapps | England | 9 January 1897 | 1 | 0 | 0 | 0 | 0 |
| 155 | Billy Alexander | Ireland | 19 March 1898 | 7 | 2 | 0 | 0 | 0 |
| 156 | Joe Booth | Ireland | 19 March 1898 | 1 | 0 | 0 | 0 | 0 |
| 157 | George Boots | Ireland | 19 March 1898 | 16 | 1 | 0 | 0 | 0 |
| 158 | Hopkin Davies | Ireland | 19 March 1898 | 4 | 0 | 0 | 0 | 0 |
| 159 | Tom Dobson | Ireland | 19 March 1898 | 4 | 1 | 0 | 0 | 0 |
| 160 | Viv Huzzey | Ireland | 19 March 1898 | 5 | 4 | 0 | 0 | 1 |
| 161 | Pussy Jones | Ireland | 19 March 1898 | 2 | 0 | 0 | 0 | 0 |
| 162 | Jere Blake | England | 7 January 1899 | 9 | 0 | 0 | 0 | 0 |
| 163 | Alfred Brice | England | 7 January 1899 | 18 | 2 | 1 | 0 | 0 |
| 164 | Jehoida Hodges | England | 7 January 1899 | 23 | 6 | 0 | 0 | 0 |
| 165 | Willie Llewellyn | England | 7 January 1899 | 20 | 16 | 0 | 0 | 0 |
| 166 | Will Parker | England | 7 January 1899 | 2 | 0 | 0 | 0 | 0 |
| 167 | Fred Scrine | England | 7 January 1899 | 3 | 0 | 0 | 0 | 0 |
| 168 | Reg Skrimshire | England | 7 January 1899 | 3 | 0 | 0 | 0 | 0 |
| 169 | George Davies | England | 6 January 1900 | 9 | 1 | 4 | 0 | 0 |
| 170 | Lou Phillips | England | 6 January 1900 | 4 | 0 | 0 | 0 | 0 |
| 171 | Dan Rees | England | 6 January 1900 | 5 | 0 | 0 | 0 | 0 |
| 172 | Robert Thomas | England | 6 January 1900 | 4 | 0 | 0 | 0 | 0 |
| 173 | Billy Trew | England | 6 January 1900 | 29 | 11 | 1 | 0 | 1 |
| 174 | Buller Williams | England | 6 January 1900 | 4 | 2 | 0 | 0 | 0 |
| 175 | George Dobson | Scotland | 27 January 1900 | 1 | 0 | 0 | 0 | 0 |
| 176 | Bala Jones | England | 5 January 1901 | 1 | 0 | 0 | 0 | 0 |
| 177 | Rhys Gabe | Ireland | 16 March 1901 | 24 | 11 | 0 | 0 | 0 |
| 178 | Bob Jones | Ireland | 16 March 1901 | 1 | 0 | 0 | 0 | 0 |
| 179 | Dick Jones | Ireland | 16 March 1901 | 15 | 3 | 0 | 0 | 0 |
| 180 | Dicky Owen | Ireland | 16 March 1901 | 35 | 2 | 0 | 0 | 0 |
| 181 | Arthur Harding | England | 11 January 1902 | 20 | 1 | 0 | 0 | 0 |
| 182 | Dai Jones | England | 11 January 1902 | 13 | 0 | 0 | 0 | 0 |
| 183 | John Strand-Jones | England | 11 January 1902 | 5 | 0 | 4 | 1 | 0 |
| 184 | Will Joseph | England | 11 January 1902 | 16 | 0 | 0 | 0 | 0 |
| 185 | Teddy Morgan | England | 11 January 1902 | 16 | 14 | 0 | 0 | 0 |
| 186 | Will Osborne | England | 11 January 1902 | 6 | 1 | 0 | 0 | 0 |
| 187 | Nathaniel Walters | England | 11 January 1902 | 1 | 0 | 0 | 0 | 0 |
| 188 | Harry Jones | Scotland | 1 February 1902 | 2 | 0 | 0 | 0 | 0 |
| 189 | Fred Jowett | England | 10 January 1903 | 1 | 0 | 0 | 0 | 0 |
| 190 | Twyber Travers | England | 10 January 1903 | 25 | 1 | 0 | 0 | 0 |
| 191 | William Richard Arnold | Scotland | 7 February 1903 | 1 | 0 | 0 | 0 | 0 |
| 192 | Bert Winfield | Ireland | 14 March 1903 | 15 | 0 | 14 | 6 | 0 |
| 193 | Jack Evans | England | 9 January 1904 | 1 | 0 | 0 | 0 | 0 |
| 194 | David John Thomas | England | 9 January 1904 | 10 | 0 | 0 | 0 | 0 |
| 195 | David Harris Davies | Scotland | 6 February 1904 | 1 | 0 | 0 | 0 | 0 |
| 196 | Billy O'Neill | Scotland | 6 February 1904 | 11 | 0 | 0 | 0 | 0 |
| 197 | Cliff Pritchard | Scotland | 6 February 1904 | 5 | 2 | 0 | 0 | 0 |
| 198 | Edwin Thomas Maynard | Scotland | 6 February 1904 | 6 | 0 | 0 | 0 | 0 |
| 199 | Harry Vaughan Watkins | Scotland | 6 February 1904 | 6 | 1 | 0 | 0 | 0 |
| 200 | Sid Bevan | Ireland | 12 March 1904 | 1 | 0 | 0 | 0 | 0 |
| 201 | Howell Jones | Ireland | 12 March 1904 | 1 | 0 | 0 | 0 | 0 |
| 202 | Charlie Pritchard | Ireland | 12 March 1904 | 14 | 1 | 0 | 0 | 0 |
| 203 | Anthony Windham Jones | Ireland | 11 March 1905 | 1 | 1 | 0 | 0 | 0 |
| 204 | Jack Williams | Ireland | 11 March 1905 | 4 | 0 | 0 | 0 | 0 |
| 205 | Percy Bush | New Zealand | 16 December 1905 | 8 | 2 | 1 | 0 | 3 |
| 206 | Hopkin Maddock | England | 13 January 1906 | 6 | 6 | 0 | 0 | 0 |
| 207 | Reggie Gibbs | Scotland | 3 February 1906 | 16 | 17 | 3 | 0 | 0 |
| 208 | Tom Evans | Ireland | 10 March 1906 | 18 | 1 | 0 | 0 | 0 |
| 209 | Jack Powell | Ireland | 10 March 1906 | 1 | 0 | 0 | 0 | 0 |
| 210 | Dai Westacott | Ireland | 10 March 1906 | 1 | 0 | 0 | 0 | 0 |
| 211 | John Dyke | South Africa | 1 December 1906 | 1 | 0 | 0 | 0 | 0 |
| 212 | Jack Jenkins | South Africa | 1 December 1906 | 1 | 0 | 0 | 0 | 0 |
| 213 | Dick Thomas | South Africa | 1 December 1906 | 4 | 0 | 0 | 0 | 0 |
| 214 | Johnny Williams | South Africa | 1 December 1906 | 17 | 17 | 0 | 0 | 0 |
| 215 | John Alf Brown | England | 12 January 1907 | 7 | 1 | 0 | 0 | 0 |
| 216 | Bailey Davies | England | 12 January 1907 | 1 | 0 | 0 | 0 | 0 |
| 217 | William Dowell | England | 12 January 1907 | 7 | 0 | 0 | 0 | 0 |
| 218 | Jack Evans | England | 12 January 1907 | 3 | 0 | 0 | 0 | 0 |
| 219 | James Watts | England | 12 January 1907 | 11 | 2 | 0 | 0 | 0 |
| 220 | Jim Webb | Scotland | 2 February 1907 | 20 | 2 | 0 | 0 | 0 |
| 221 | Dickie David | Ireland | 9 March 1907 | 1 | 0 | 0 | 0 | 0 |
| 222 | Ponty Jones | Ireland | 9 March 1907 | 1 | 1 | 0 | 0 | 0 |
| 223 | Tommy Vile | England | 18 January 1908 | 8 | 0 | 0 | 0 | 0 |
| 224 | George Hayward | Scotland | 1 February 1908 | 5 | 0 | 0 | 0 | 0 |
| 225 | Phil Hopkins | Australia | 12 December 1908 | 4 | 3 | 0 | 0 | 0 |
| 226 | Jack Jones | Australia | 12 December 1908 | 14 | 6 | 0 | 0 | 0 |
| 227 | Ivor Morgan | Australia | 12 December 1908 | 13 | 6 | 0 | 0 | 0 |
| 228 | Phil Waller | Australia | 12 December 1908 | 6 | 0 | 0 | 0 | 0 |
| 229 | Jack Bancroft | England | 16 January 1909 | 18 | 0 | 38 | 4 | 0 |
| 230 | Jake Blackmore | England | 16 January 1909 | 1 | 0 | 0 | 0 | 0 |
| 231 | Mel Baker | Scotland | 6 February 1909 | 3 | 4 | 0 | 0 | 0 |
| 232 | Thomas Lloyd | France | 23 February 1909 | 7 | 0 | 0 | 0 | 0 |
| 233 | Rees Thomas | France | 23 February 1909 | 8 | 1 | 0 | 0 | 0 |
| 234 | Ben Gronow | France | 1 January 1910 | 1 | 1 | 0 | 0 | 0 |
| 235 | Joe Pullman | France | 1 January 1910 | 1 | 0 | 0 | 0 | 0 |
| 236 | Harry Jarman | England | 15 January 1910 | 4 | 0 | 0 | 0 | 0 |
| 237 | Joe Pugsley | England | 15 January 1910 | 7 | 2 | 0 | 0 | 0 |
| 238 | Ernie Jenkins | Scotland | 5 February 1910 | 2 | 0 | 0 | 0 | 0 |
| 239 | Willie Morgan | Scotland | 5 February 1910 | 1 | 0 | 0 | 0 | 0 |
| 240 | Billy Spiller | Scotland | 5 February 1910 | 10 | 4 | 0 | 0 | 1 |
| 241 | Louis Dyke | Ireland | 12 March 1910 | 4 | 1 | 2 | 0 | 0 |
| 242 | Fred Birt | England | 21 January 1911 | 7 | 0 | 0 | 1 | 1 |
| 243 | Percy Coldrick | England | 21 January 1911 | 6 | 0 | 0 | 0 | 0 |
| 244 | Bill Perry | England | 21 January 1911 | 1 | 0 | 0 | 0 | 0 |
| 245 | Jim Birch | Scotland | 4 February 1911 | 2 | 0 | 0 | 0 | 0 |
| 246 | William Evans | Ireland | 11 March 1911 | 1 | 0 | 0 | 0 | 0 |
| 247 | Ewan Davies | England | 20 January 1912 | 2 | 2 | 0 | 0 | 0 |
| 248 | Howell Davies | England | 20 January 1912 | 2 | 0 | 0 | 0 | 0 |
| 249 | Clem Lewis | England | 20 January 1912 | 11 | 3 | 3 | 0 | 1 |
| 250 | Glyn Stephens | England | 20 January 1912 | 10 | 0 | 0 | 0 | 0 |
| 251 | Len Trump | England | 20 January 1912 | 4 | 0 | 0 | 0 | 0 |
| 252 | Harry Uzzell | England | 20 January 1912 | 15 | 2 | 0 | 0 | 0 |
| 253 | William Davies | Scotland | 3 February 1912 | 2 | 1 | 0 | 0 | 0 |
| 254 | George Littlewood Hirst | Scotland | 3 February 1912 | 6 | 3 | 0 | 0 | 2 |
| 255 | Reggie Plummer | Scotland | 3 February 1912 | 5 | 2 | 0 | 0 | 0 |
| 256 | Frank Hawkins | Ireland | 9 March 1912 | 2 | 0 | 0 | 0 | 0 |
| 257 | Harry Hiams | Ireland | 9 March 1912 | 2 | 0 | 0 | 0 | 0 |
| 258 | Billy Jenkins | Ireland | 9 March 1912 | 4 | 0 | 0 | 0 | 0 |
| 259 | Bryn Lewis | Ireland | 9 March 1912 | 2 | 2 | 0 | 0 | 0 |
| 260 | Walter Martin | Ireland | 9 March 1912 | 3 | 0 | 0 | 0 | 0 |
| 261 | Gus Merry | Ireland | 9 March 1912 | 2 | 0 | 0 | 0 | 0 |
| 262 | Tom Williams | Ireland | 9 March 1912 | 6 | 1 | 0 | 0 | 0 |
| 263 | Harold Thomas | France | 25 March 1912 | 1 | 0 | 1 | 0 | 0 |
| 264 | Frank Andrews | South Africa | 14 December 1912 | 4 | 0 | 0 | 0 | 0 |
| 265 | Billy Geen | South Africa | 14 December 1912 | 3 | 0 | 0 | 0 | 0 |
| 266 | Bert Hollingdale | South Africa | 14 December 1912 | 2 | 0 | 0 | 0 | 0 |
| 267 | Percy Jones | South Africa | 14 December 1912 | 8 | 0 | 0 | 0 | 0 |
| 268 | Johnnie Morgan | South Africa | 14 December 1912 | 2 | 0 | 0 | 0 | 0 |
| 269 | Fred Perrett | South Africa | 14 December 1912 | 5 | 0 | 0 | 0 | 0 |
| 270 | Horace Thomas | South Africa | 14 December 1912 | 2 | 0 | 0 | 0 | 0 |
| 271 | Harry Wetter | South Africa | 14 December 1912 | 2 | 0 | 0 | 0 | 0 |
| 272 | Bobbie Williams | South Africa | 14 December 1912 | 4 | 0 | 0 | 0 | 0 |
| 273 | Jenkin Alban Davies | Scotland | 1 February 1913 | 6 | 2 | 0 | 0 | 0 |
| 274 | Tuan Jones | Scotland | 1 February 1913 | 1 | 1 | 0 | 0 | 0 |
| 275 | Howell Lewis | Scotland | 1 February 1913 | 4 | 0 | 0 | 0 | 0 |
| 276 | Bobby Lloyd | Scotland | 1 February 1913 | 7 | 0 | 0 | 0 | 0 |
| 277 | Rees Richards | Scotland | 1 February 1913 | 3 | 0 | 0 | 0 | 0 |
| 278 | Glyn Gething | France | 27 February 1913 | 1 | 0 | 0 | 0 | 0 |
| 279 | Mark Lewis | France | 27 February 1913 | 1 | 0 | 0 | 0 | 0 |
| 280 | William Evans | England | 17 January 1914 | 4 | 1 | 0 | 0 | 0 |
| 281 | Jack Jones | England | 17 January 1914 | 4 | 1 | 0 | 0 | 0 |
| 282 | Edgar Morgan | England | 17 January 1914 | 4 | 0 | 0 | 0 | 0 |
| 283 | David Watts | England | 17 January 1914 | 4 | 0 | 0 | 0 | 0 |
| 284 | William Watt | England | 17 January 1914 | 1 | 1 | 0 | 0 | 0 |
| 285 | Ivor Davies | Scotland | 7 February 1914 | 3 | 2 | 0 | 0 | 0 |
| 286 | Jack Wetter | Scotland | 7 February 1914 | 10 | 4 | 1 | 0 | 0 |
| 287 | Ianto Davies | New Zealand Services | 21 April 1919 | 1 | 0 | 0 | 0 | 0 |
| 288 | Ike Fowler | New Zealand Services | 21 April 1919 | 1 | 0 | 0 | 0 | 0 |
| 289 | Gwyn Francis | New Zealand Services | 21 April 1919 | 2 | 0 | 0 | 0 | 0 |
| 290 | Bill Havard | New Zealand Services | 21 April 1919 | 1 | 0 | 0 | 0 | 0 |
| 291 | Jim Jones | New Zealand Services | 21 April 1919 | 6 | 0 | 0 | 0 | 0 |
| 292 | Bill Morris | New Zealand Services | 21 April 1919 | 3 | 0 | 0 | 0 | 0 |
| 293 | Trevor Nicholas | New Zealand Services | 21 April 1919 | 1 | 0 | 0 | 0 | 0 |
| 294 | Tom Parker | New Zealand Services | 21 April 1919 | 15 | 2 | 0 | 0 | 0 |
| 295 | Aaron Rees | New Zealand Services | 21 April 1919 | 1 | 0 | 0 | 0 | 0 |
| 296 | Evan Rees | New Zealand Services | 21 April 1919 | 1 | 0 | 0 | 0 | 0 |
| 297 | Jerry Shea | New Zealand Services | 21 April 1919 | 4 | 1 | 1 | 2 | 2 |
| 298 | Melbourne Thomas | New Zealand Services | 21 April 1919 | 6 | 2 | 0 | 0 | 0 |
| 299 | Jack Whitfield | New Zealand Services | 21 April 1919 | 12 | 5 | 0 | 0 | 0 |
| 300 | Ben Beynon | England | 17 January 1920 | 2 | 0 | 0 | 0 | 0 |
| 301 | Brinley Evans | England | 17 January 1920 | 5 | 0 | 0 | 0 | 0 |
| 302 | Albert Jenkins | England | 17 January 1920 | 14 | 4 | 7 | 3 | 3 |
| 303 | Charles Jones | England | 17 January 1920 | 3 | 0 | 0 | 0 | 0 |
| 304 | Steve Morris | England | 17 January 1920 | 19 | 0 | 0 | 0 | 0 |
| 305 | George Oliver | England | 17 January 1920 | 4 | 0 | 0 | 0 | 0 |
| 306 | Wickham Powell | England | 17 January 1920 | 4 | 2 | 0 | 0 | 0 |
| 307 | Joe Rees | England | 17 January 1920 | 12 | 0 | 2 | 1 | 0 |
| 308 | Jack Williams | England | 17 January 1920 | 7 | 1 | 0 | 0 | 0 |
| 309 | Brinley Williams | Scotland | 7 February 1920 | 3 | 3 | 0 | 0 | 0 |
| 310 | Dick Huxtable | France | 17 February 1920 | 2 | 0 | 0 | 0 | 0 |
| 311 | Fred Reeves | France | 17 February 1920 | 3 | 0 | 0 | 0 | 0 |
| 312 | Edgar Morgan | Ireland | 13 March 1920 | 4 | 0 | 0 | 0 | 0 |
| 313 | Len Attewell | England | 15 January 1921 | 3 | 0 | 0 | 0 | 0 |
| 314 | Dai Edwards | England | 15 January 1921 | 1 | 0 | 0 | 0 | 0 |
| 315 | Wilf Hodder | England | 15 January 1921 | 3 | 1 | 0 | 0 | 0 |
| 316 | Codger Johnson | England | 15 January 1921 | 12 | 1 | 0 | 1 | 0 |
| 317 | Douglas Marsden-Jones | England | 15 January 1921 | 2 | 0 | 0 | 0 | 0 |
| 318 | Johnny Ring | England | 15 January 1921 | 1 | 1 | 0 | 0 | 0 |
| 319 | Stanley Winmill | England | 15 January 1921 | 4 | 0 | 0 | 0 | 0 |
| 320 | Paul Baker-Jones | Scotland | 5 February 1921 | 1 | 0 | 0 | 0 | 0 |
| 321 | Billy Bowen | Scotland | 5 February 1921 | 6 | 2 | 0 | 0 | 0 |
| 322 | Frankie Evans | Scotland | 5 February 1921 | 1 | 0 | 0 | 0 | 0 |
| 323 | Tom Roberts | Scotland | 5 February 1921 | 9 | 0 | 0 | 0 | 0 |
| 324 | Harry Davies | France | 26 February 1921 | 3 | 0 | 0 | 0 | 0 |
| 325 | Ossie Male | France | 26 February 1921 | 11 | 0 | 6 | 1 | 0 |
| 326 | Tudor Williams | France | 26 February 1921 | 1 | 0 | 0 | 0 | 0 |
| 327 | Ambrose Baker | Ireland | 12 March 1921 | 5 | 1 | 0 | 0 | 0 |
| 328 | Archie Brown | Ireland | 12 March 1921 | 1 | 0 | 0 | 0 | 0 |
| 329 | Daph Davies | Ireland | 12 March 1921 | 2 | 0 | 0 | 0 | 0 |
| 330 | Jack Prosser | Ireland | 12 March 1921 | 1 | 0 | 0 | 0 | 0 |
| 331 | Will Cummins | England | 21 January 1922 | 4 | 1 | 0 | 0 | 0 |
| 332 | Bobby Delahay | England | 21 January 1922 | 18 | 2 | 0 | 0 | 0 |
| 333 | Islwyn Evans | England | 21 January 1922 | 4 | 3 | 0 | 0 | 1 |
| 334 | Dai Hiddlestone | England | 21 January 1922 | 5 | 1 | 0 | 0 | 0 |
| 335 | Tom Jones | England | 21 January 1922 | 6 | 1 | 0 | 0 | 0 |
| 336 | Frank Palmer | England | 21 January 1922 | 3 | 1 | 0 | 0 | 0 |
| 337 | Cliff Richards | England | 21 January 1922 | 5 | 2 | 0 | 0 | 0 |
| 338 | John Stephens | England | 21 January 1922 | 4 | 0 | 0 | 0 | 0 |
| 339 | Fred Samuel | Scotland | 4 February 1922 | 3 | 0 | 2 | 0 | 0 |
| 340 | Arthur Cornish | England | 20 January 1923 | 10 | 1 | 0 | 0 | 1 |
| 341 | Dai Davies | England | 20 January 1923 | 2 | 0 | 0 | 0 | 0 |
| 342 | Rowe Harding | England | 20 January 1923 | 17 | 5 | 0 | 0 | 0 |
| 343 | Gwilym Michael | England | 20 January 1923 | 3 | 1 | 0 | 0 | 0 |
| 344 | Gethin Thomas | England | 20 January 1923 | 4 | 0 | 0 | 0 | 0 |
| 345 | Joe Thompson | England | 20 January 1923 | 1 | 0 | 0 | 0 | 0 |
| 346 | Lew Jenkins | Scotland | 3 February 1923 | 2 | 0 | 0 | 0 | 0 |
| 347 | Dai John | France | 24 February 1923 | 5 | 3 | 0 | 0 | 0 |
| 348 | Dan Pascoe | France | 24 February 1923 | 2 | 0 | 0 | 0 | 0 |
| 349 | Mapson Williams | France | 24 February 1923 | 1 | 0 | 0 | 0 | 0 |
| 350 | Tom Collins | Ireland | 10 March 1923 | 1 | 0 | 0 | 0 | 0 |
| 351 | Stan Davies | Ireland | 10 March 1923 | | | | | |
| 352 | John Davies | Ireland | 10 March 1923 | 1 | 0 | 0 | 0 | 0 |
| 353 | Jack Powell | Ireland | 10 March 1923 | | | | | |
| 354 | William Radford | Ireland | 10 March 1923 | | | | | |
| 355 | Tom Richards | Ireland | 10 March 1923 | | | | | |
| 356 | Hunt Davies | England | 19 January 1924 | | | | | |
| 357 | Candy Evans | England | 19 January 1924 | 3 | 0 | 0 | 0 | 0 |
| 358 | Ivor Jones | England | 19 January 1924 | 16 | 1 | 5 | 0 | 0 |
| 359 | Glyn Morris | England | 19 January 1924 | | | | | |
| 360 | William Ould | England | 19 January 1924 | | | | | |
| 361 | Albert Owen | England | 19 January 1924 | | | | | |
| 362 | Charlie Pugh | England | 19 January 1924 | 7 | 1 | 0 | 0 | 0 |
| 363 | Ivor Thomas | England | 19 January 1924 | | | | | |
| 364 | Eddie Watkins | England | 19 January 1924 | | | | | |
| 365 | Harold Davies | Scotland | 2 February 1924 | 1 | 0 | 0 | 0 | 0 |
| 366 | Jack Evans | Scotland | 2 February 1924 | 1 | 0 | 0 | 0 | 0 |
| 367 | Vince Griffiths | Scotland | 2 February 1924 | 3 | 1 | 0 | 0 | 1 |
| 368 | Mel Rosser | Scotland | 2 February 1924 | 2 | 0 | 0 | 0 | 0 |
| 369 | Tommy Evans | Ireland | 8 March 1924 | | | | | |
| 370 | Jack Gore | Ireland | 8 March 1924 | 4 | 0 | 0 | 0 | 0 |
| 371 | George Hathway | Ireland | 8 March 1924 | | | | | |
| 372 | William Jones | Ireland | 8 March 1924 | | | | | |
| 373 | Dai Parker | Ireland | 8 March 1924 | 10 | 0 | 4 | 1 | 0 |
| 374 | Bob Randall | Ireland | 8 March 1924 | | | | | |
| 375 | Ernie Finch | France | 27 March 1924 | 7 | 4 | 0 | 0 | 0 |
| 376 | Joe Jones | France | 27 March 1924 | 1 | 0 | 0 | 0 | 0 |
| 377 | Arnold Rickards | France | 27 March 1924 | | | | | |
| 378 | Albert Stock | France | 27 March 1924 | 4 | 0 | 0 | 0 | 0 |
| 379 | Cliff Williams | New Zealand | 29 November 1924 | 2 | 0 | 0 | 0 | 0 |
| 380 | Eddie Williams | New Zealand | 29 November 1924 | 2 | 0 | 0 | 0 | 0 |
| 381 | Willie Hopkins | England | 17 January 1925 | | | | | |
| 382 | Will James | England | 17 January 1925 | 2 | 1 | 0 | 0 | 0 |
| 383 | Idris Jones | England | 17 January 1925 | | | | | |
| 384 | Bryn Phillips | England | 17 January 1925 | 5 | 0 | 0 | 0 | 0 |
| 385 | Idris Richards | England | 17 January 1925 | | | | | |
| 386 | Cyril Thomas | England | 17 January 1925 | | | | | |
| 387 | Evan Williams | England | 17 January 1925 | 2 | 0 | 0 | 0 | 0 |
| 388 | Ron Herrera | Scotland | 7 February 1925 | | | | | |
| 389 | Steve Lawrence | Scotland | 7 February 1925 | | | | | |
| 390 | Edward Beynon | France | 28 February 1925 | | | | | |
| 391 | Will Lewis | France | 28 February 1925 | | | | | |
| 392 | Jim Brown | Ireland | 14 March 1925 | | | | | |
| 393 | Sydney Hinam | Ireland | 14 March 1925 | 5 | 0 | 0 | 0 | 0 |
| 394 | Arthur John | Ireland | 14 March 1925 | | | | | |
| 395 | Nathan Rocyn-Jones | Ireland | 14 March 1925 | 1 | 0 | 0 | 0 | 0 |
| 396 | Bernard Turnbull | Ireland | 14 March 1925 | 6 | 1 | 0 | 0 | 0 |
| 397 | George Andrews | England | 16 January 1926 | 5 | 3 | 0 | 0 | 0 |
| 398 | David Evans | England | 16 January 1926 | 1 | 0 | 0 | 0 | 0 |
| 399 | Tom Hopkins | England | 16 January 1926 | | | | | |
| 400 | David Morgan Jenkins | England | 16 January 1926 | 4 | 0 | 0 | 0 | 0 |
| 401 | Howell John | England | 16 January 1926 | | | | | |
| 402 | Dai Jones | England | 16 January 1926 | 5 | 0 | 0 | 0 | 0 |
| 403 | Bobby Jones | England | 16 January 1926 | | | | | |
| 404 | Tom Lewis | England | 16 January 1926 | 3 | 0 | 0 | 0 | 0 |
| 405 | Bill Everson | Scotland | 6 February 1926 | 1 | 0 | 1 | 0 | 0 |
| 406 | Wick Powell | Scotland | 6 February 1926 | 27 | 1 | 1 | 0 | 2 |
| 407 | Emlyn Watkins | Scotland | 6 February 1926 | 3 | 1 | 0 | 0 | 0 |
| 408 | Windsor Hopkin Lewis | Ireland | 13 March 1926 | | | | | |
| 409 | Tommy Rees | Ireland | 13 March 1926 | 4 | 0 | 2 | 0 | 0 |
| 410 | Charles Rowlands | Ireland | 13 March 1926 | | | | | |
| 411 | Harry Phillips | England | 15 January 1927 | 9 | 0 | 0 | 0 | 0 |
| 412 | John Roberts | England | 15 January 1927 | 13 | 5 | 0 | 0 | 0 |
| 413 | Watcyn Thomas | England | 15 January 1927 | 14 | 2 | 0 | 0 | 0 |
| 414 | Billy Williams | England | 15 January 1927 | 4 | 0 | 0 | 0 | 0 |
| 415 | Tom Arthur | Scotland | 5 February 1927 | 18 | 4 | 0 | 0 | 0 |
| 416 | John Bartlett | Scotland | 5 February 1927 | | | | | |
| 417 | Ned Jenkins | Scotland | 5 February 1927 | 21 | 0 | 0 | 0 | 0 |
| 418 | Gwyn Richards | Scotland | 5 February 1927 | 1 | 0 | 0 | 0 | 0 |
| 419 | Jim Burns | France | 26 February 1927 | | | | | |
| 420 | Guy Morgan | France | 26 February 1927 | 8 | 3 | 0 | 0 | 1 |
| 421 | Lonza Bowdler | Australia | 26 November 1927 | 15 | 0 | 0 | 0 | 0 |
| 422 | Gus Broughton | Australia | 26 November 1927 | 2 | 0 | 0 | 0 | 0 |
| 423 | Tal Harris | Australia | 26 November 1927 | 1 | 0 | 0 | 0 | 0 |
| 424 | Thomas Hollingdale | Australia | 26 November 1927 | | | | | |
| 425 | David Jenkins | Australia | 26 November 1927 | 2 | 0 | 0 | 0 | 0 |
| 426 | Dan Jones | Australia | 26 November 1927 | | | | | |
| 427 | Iorwerth Jones | Australia | 26 November 1927 | 5 | 0 | 0 | 0 | 0 |
| 428 | Roy Jones | Australia | 26 November 1927 | | | | | |
| 429 | Cecil Pritchard | England | 21 January 1928 | | | | | |
| 430 | Archie Skym | England | 21 January 1928 | 20 | 2 | 0 | 0 | 0 |
| 431 | Gwyn Davies | France | 9 April 1928 | 3 | 0 | 0 | 0 | 0 |
| 432 | Jack Bassett | England | 19 January 1929 | 15 | 0 | 10 | 3 | 0 |
| 433 | Harold Jones | England | 19 January 1929 | 2 | 0 | 0 | 0 | 0 |
| 434 | Dick Jones | England | 19 January 1929 | | | | | |
| 435 | Jack Morley | England | 19 January 1929 | 14 | 5 | 0 | 0 | 0 |
| 436 | Bill Roberts | England | 19 January 1929 | 1 | 0 | 0 | 0 | 0 |
| 437 | Bob Barrell | Scotland | 2 February 1929 | | | | | |
| 438 | Harry Bowcott | Scotland | 2 February 1929 | 8 | 1 | 0 | 0 | 0 |
| 439 | Harry Peacock | Scotland | 2 February 1929 | 6 | 2 | 0 | 0 | 0 |
| 440 | Frank Williams | Scotland | 2 February 1929 | | | | | |
| 441 | Arthur Lemon | Ireland | 9 March 1929 | 13 | 0 | 0 | 0 | 0 |
| 442 | Arthur Hickman | England | 18 January 1930 | | | | | |
| 443 | Tommy Jones-Davies | England | 18 January 1930 | | | | | |
| 444 | David Roberts | England | 18 January 1930 | | | | | |
| 445 | Ocker Thomas | England | 18 January 1930 | | | | | |
| 446 | Ronnie Boon | Scotland | 1 February 1930 | 12 | 4 | 0 | 0 | 2 |
| 447 | Bert Day | Scotland | 1 February 1930 | 5 | 0 | 0 | 0 | 0 |
| 448 | Chick Jones | Scotland | 1 February 1930 | | | | | |
| 449 | Dai Thomas | Scotland | 1 February 1930 | | | | | |
| 450 | Norman Fender | Ireland | 8 March 1930 | | | | | |
| 451 | Howie Jones | Ireland | 8 March 1930 | | | | | |
| 452 | Claude Davey | France | 21 April 1930 | 23 | 5 | 0 | 0 | 0 |
| 453 | Edgar Jones | France | 21 April 1930 | 5 | 0 | 0 | 0 | 0 |
| 454 | Tommy Scourfield | France | 21 April 1930 | 1 | 0 | 0 | 0 | 0 |
| 455 | Tom Day | England | 17 January 1931 | 13 | 0 | 0 | 0 | 0 |
| 456 | David James | France | 28 February 1931 | | | | | |
| 457 | Jim Lang | France | 28 February 1931 | 12 | 1 | 0 | 0 | 0 |
| 458 | Dicky Ralph | France | 28 February 1931 | 6 | 3 | 0 | 0 | 2 |
| 459 | Sgili Davies | South Africa | 5 December 1931 | 4 | 1 | 0 | 0 | 0 |
| 460 | Bryn Evans | England | 21 January 1933 | 1 | 0 | 0 | 0 | 0 |
| 461 | Iorrie Isaacs | England | 21 January 1933 | 2 | 0 | 0 | 0 | 0 |
| 462 | Vivian Jenkins | England | 21 January 1933 | 14 | 1 | 10 | 3 | 1 |
| 463 | Arthur Jones | England | 21 January 1933 | | | | | |
| 464 | Raymond Bark-Jones | England | 21 January 1933 | 2 | 0 | 0 | 0 | 0 |
| 465 | Maurice Turnbull | England | 21 January 1933 | 2 | 0 | 0 | 0 | 0 |
| 466 | Wilf Wooller | England | 21 January 1933 | 18 | 6 | 1 | 2 | 0 |
| 467 | Gwyn Bayliss | Scotland | 4 February 1933 | | | | | |
| 468 | Bryn Evans | Scotland | 4 February 1933 | 6 | 0 | 0 | 0 | 0 |
| 469 | Ron Morris | Scotland | 4 February 1933 | | | | | |
| 470 | Billy Moore | Ireland | 11 March 1933 | 1 | 0 | 0 | 0 | 0 |
| 471 | Lou Rees | Ireland | 11 March 1933 | 1 | 0 | 0 | 0 | 0 |
| 472 | Bun Cowey | England | 20 January 1934 | | | | | |
| 473 | Cecil Davies | England | 20 January 1934 | | | | | |
| 474 | David Evans | England | 20 January 1934 | 1 | 0 | 0 | 0 | 0 |
| 475 | John Evans | England | 20 January 1934 | 1 | 0 | 0 | 0 | 0 |
| 476 | Bryn Howells | England | 20 January 1934 | 1 | 0 | 0 | 0 | 0 |
| 477 | Gomer Hughes | England | 20 January 1934 | 3 | 0 | 0 | 0 | 0 |
| 478 | Geoffrey Rees-Jones | England | 20 January 1934 | | | | | |
| 479 | Kenyon Jones | England | 20 January 1934 | | | | | |
| 480 | Cliff Jones | England | 20 January 1934 | 6 | 2 | 0 | 0 | 0 |
| 481 | Glyn Prosser | England | 20 January 1934 | 4 | 0 | 0 | 0 | 0 |
| 482 | Arthur Rees | England | 20 January 1934 | 13 | 0 | 0 | 0 | 0 |
| 483 | Idwal Rees | England | 20 January 1934 | 14 | 2 | 0 | 0 | 0 |
| 484 | Harry Truman | England | 20 January 1934 | | | | | |
| 485 | Iorwerth Evans | Scotland | 3 February 1934 | 2 | 0 | 0 | 0 | 0 |
| 486 | Albert Fear | Scotland | 3 February 1934 | 4 | 1 | 0 | 0 | 0 |
| 487 | Bert Jones | Scotland | 3 February 1934 | | | | | |
| 488 | Dai Prosser | Scotland | 3 February 1934 | | | | | |
| 489 | Bill Ward | Scotland | 3 February 1934 | | | | | |
| 490 | Arthur Bassett | Ireland | 10 March 1934 | 6 | 0 | 0 | 0 | 0 |
| 491 | Con Murphy | England | 19 January 1935 | | | | | |
| 492 | Thomas Rees | Scotland | 2 February 1935 | | | | | |
| 493 | Trevor Williams | Scotland | 2 February 1935 | | | | | |
| 494 | Tommy James | Ireland | 9 March 1935 | | | | | |
| 495 | Harry Payne | New Zealand | 21 December 1935 | 1 | 0 | 0 | 0 | 0 |
| 496 | Haydn Tanner | New Zealand | 21 December 1935 | 25 | 0 | 0 | 0 | 0 |
| 497 | Don Tarr | New Zealand | 21 December 1935 | 1 | 0 | 0 | 0 | 0 |
| 498 | Eddie V. Watkins | New Zealand | 21 December 1935 | 8 | 0 | 0 | 0 | 0 |
| 499 | Edgar Long | England | 18 January 1936 | 7 | 0 | 0 | 0 | 0 |
| 500 | Barney McCall | England | 18 January 1936 | 3 | 0 | 0 | 0 | 0 |
| 501 | Harold Thomas | England | 18 January 1936 | 6 | 0 | 0 | 0 | 0 |
| 502 | Griff Williams | England | 18 January 1936 | | | | | |
| 503 | Willie Davies | Ireland | 14 March 1936 | | | | | |
| 504 | Bill Clement | England | 16 January 1937 | 6 | 1 | 0 | 0 | 0 |
| 505 | Emrys Evans | England | 16 January 1937 | | | | | |
| 506 | David Thomas | England | 16 January 1937 | | | | | |
| 507 | Bill Hopkin | Scotland | 6 February 1937 | | | | | |
| 508 | Harry Rees | Scotland | 6 February 1937 | | | | | |
| 509 | Bunner Travers | Scotland | 6 February 1937 | | | | | |
| 510 | Ivor Bennett | Ireland | 3 April 1937 | | | | | |
| 511 | Walter Legge | Ireland | 3 April 1937 | | | | | |
| 512 | Russell Taylor | Ireland | 3 April 1937 | | | | | |
| 513 | Allen McCarley | England | 15 January 1938 | | | | | |
| 514 | Fred Morgan | England | 15 January 1938 | | | | | |
| 515 | Eddie Morgan | England | 15 January 1938 | 4 | 0 | 0 | 0 | 0 |
| 516 | Walter Vickery | England | 15 January 1938 | 4 | 0 | 0 | 0 | 0 |
| 517 | Cyril Challinor | England | 21 January 1939 | 1 | 0 | 0 | 0 | 0 |
| 518 | Idwal Davies | England | 21 January 1939 | 1 | 0 | 0 | 0 | 0 |
| 519 | Wendy Davis | England | 21 January 1939 | 3 | 0 | 0 | 0 | 0 |
| 520 | John Ford | England | 21 January 1939 | 1 | 0 | 0 | 0 | 0 |
| 521 | Syd Williams | England | 21 January 1939 | 3 | 0 | 0 | 0 | 0 |
| 522 | Howard Davies | Scotland | 4 February 1939 | | | | | |
| 523 | Leslie Davies | Scotland | 4 February 1939 | | | | | |
| 524 | Mickey Davies | Scotland | 4 February 1939 | | | | | |
| 525 | Elvet Jones | Scotland | 4 February 1939 | 1 | 0 | 0 | 0 | 0 |
| 526 | Les Manfield | Scotland | 4 February 1939 | | | | | |
| 527 | Ron Price | Scotland | 4 February 1939 | | | | | |
| 528 | Viv Law | Ireland | 11 March 1939 | | | | | |
| 529 | Chris Matthews | Ireland | 11 March 1939 | | | | | |
| 530 | Griff Bevan | England | 18 January 1947 | | | | | |
| 531 | Reg Blakemore | England | 18 January 1947 | 1 | 0 | 0 | 0 | 0 |
| 532 | Billy Cleaver | England | 18 January 1947 | 14 | 1 | 0 | 0 | 1 |
| 533 | Gwyn Evans | England | 18 January 1947 | | | | | |
| 534 | Dai Jones | England | 18 January 1947 | | | | | |
| 535 | Ken Jones | England | 18 January 1947 | 44 | 17 | 0 | 0 | 0 |
| 536 | Jack Matthews | England | 18 January 1947 | | | | | |
| 537 | George Parsons | England | 18 January 1947 | | | | | |
| 538 | Rees Stephens | England | 18 January 1947 | | | | | |
| 539 | Bleddyn Williams | England | 18 January 1947 | | | | | |
| 540 | Ossie Williams | England | 18 January 1947 | | | | | |
| 541 | Stan Williams | England | 18 January 1947 | | | | | |
| 542 | Leslie Williams | England | 18 January 1947 | | | | | |
| 543 | Cliff Davies | Scotland | 1 February 1947 | 16 | 1 | 0 | 0 | 0 |
| 544 | Glyn Davies | Scotland | 1 February 1947 | 11 | 0 | 0 | 0 | 0 |
| 545 | Wilf Evans | Scotland | 1 February 1947 | | | | | |
| 546 | Billy Gore | Scotland | 1 February 1947 | 3 | 0 | 0 | 0 | 0 |
| 547 | Bill Tamplin | Scotland | 1 February 1947 | | | | | |
| 548 | Bob Evans | France | 22 March 1947 | | | | | |
| 549 | Peter Rees | France | 22 March 1947 | | | | | |
| 550 | Emlyn Davies | Australia | 20 December 1947 | | | | | |
| 551 | Handel Greville | Australia | 20 December 1947 | | | | | |
| 552 | John Gwilliam | Australia | 20 December 1947 | | | | | |
| 553 | Maldwyn James | Australia | 20 December 1947 | 5 | 0 | 0 | 0 | 0 |
| 554 | Les Anthony | England | 17 January 1948 | | | | | |
| 555 | Des Jones | England | 17 January 1948 | | | | | |
| 556 | Frank Trott | England | 17 January 1948 | | | | | |
| 557 | Ray Cale | England | 15 January 1949 | 7 | 1 | 0 | 0 | 0 |
| 558 | Ernie Coleman | England | 15 January 1949 | | | | | |
| 559 | Don Hayward | England | 15 January 1949 | | | | | |
| 560 | Alun Meredith | England | 15 January 1949 | | | | | |
| 561 | Terry Cook | Scotland | 5 February 1949 | 2 | 0 | 0 | 0 | 0 |
| 562 | Windsor Major | France | 26 March 1949 | | | | | |
| 563 | Peter Stone | France | 26 March 1949 | | | | | |
| 564 | Malcolm Thomas | France | 26 March 1949 | 27 | 4 | 2 | 2 | 0 |
| 565 | Clem Thomas | France | 26 March 1949 | 26 | 1 | 0 | 0 | 0 |
| 566 | Trevor Brewer | England | 21 January 1950 | 3 | 2 | 0 | 0 | 0 |
| 567 | Dai Davies | England | 21 January 1950 | 17 | 0 | 0 | 0 | 0 |
| 568 | Roy John | England | 21 January 1950 | 19 | 1 | 0 | 0 | 0 |
| 569 | Lewis Jones | England | 21 January 1950 | 10 | 0 | 9 | 6 | 0 |
| 570 | John Robins | England | 21 January 1950 | | | | | |
| 571 | Rex Willis | England | 21 January 1950 | | | | | |
| 572 | Gerwyn Williams | Ireland | 11 March 1950 | | | | | |
| 573 | Peter Evans | England | 20 January 1951 | | | | | |
| 574 | Allen Forward | Scotland | 3 February 1951 | 6 | 0 | 0 | 0 | 0 |
| 575 | Ben Edwards | Ireland | 10 March 1951 | | | | | |
| 576 | Cliff Morgan | Ireland | 10 March 1951 | | | | | |
| 577 | Haydn Morris | France | 7 April 1951 | | | | | |
| 578 | W. O. G. "Billy" Williams | France | 7 April 1951 | 22 | 1 | 0 | 0 | 0 |
| 579 | Len Blyth | South Africa | 22 December 1951 | | | | | |
| 580 | Alun Thomas | England | 19 January 1952 | 13 | 1 | 0 | 0 | 1 |
| 581 | W. A. "Billy" Williams | Ireland | 8 March 1952 | | | | | |
| 582 | Horace Phillips | France | 22 March 1952 | | | | | |
| 583 | Geoff Beckingham | England | 17 January 1953 | | | | | |
| 584 | Roy Burnett | England | 17 January 1953 | 1 | 0 | 0 | 0 | 0 |
| 585 | Terry Davies | England | 17 January 1953 | 21 | 0 | 7 | 12 | 0 |
| 586 | Gareth Griffiths | England | 17 January 1953 | 15 | 5 | 0 | 0 | 0 |
| 587 | Dill Johnson | England | 17 January 1953 | | | | | |
| 588 | Sid Judd | England | 17 January 1953 | 10 | 1 | 0 | 0 | 0 |
| 589 | Courtenay Meredith | Scotland | 7 February 1953 | 14 | 1 | 0 | 0 | 0 |
| 590 | Russell Robins | Scotland | 7 February 1953 | | | | | |
| 591 | Trevor Lloyd | Ireland | 14 March 1953 | | | | | |
| 592 | Gwyn Rowlands | New Zealand | 19 December 1953 | 4 | 1 | 2 | 2 | 0 |
| 593 | Glyn John | England | 16 January 1954 | | | | | |
| 594 | Viv Evans | Ireland | 13 March 1954 | | | | | |
| 595 | Leighton Jenkins | Ireland | 13 March 1954 | | | | | |
| 596 | Bryn Meredith | Ireland | 13 March 1954 | 34 | 3 | 0 | 0 | 0 |
| 597 | Brian Sparks | Ireland | 13 March 1954 | 7 | 0 | 0 | 0 | 0 |
| 598 | Denzil Thomas | Ireland | 13 March 1954 | | | | | |
| 599 | RH (Rhys) Williams | Ireland | 13 March 1954 | 23 | 1 | 0 | 0 | 0 |
| 600 | Len Davies | France | 27 March 1954 | | | | | |
| 601 | Ray Williams | Scotland | 10 April 1954 | 3 | 1 | 0 | 0 | 0 |
| 602 | Glyn Davies | England | 22 January 1955 | 1 | 0 | 0 | 0 | 0 |
| 603 | Arthur Edwards | England | 22 January 1955 | | | | | |
| 604 | Gordon Wells | England | 22 January 1955 | | | | | |
| 605 | Garfield Owen | Ireland | 12 March 1955 | 6 | 0 | 7 | 4 | 0 |
| 606 | Derek Williams | France | 26 March 1955 | 2 | 1 | 0 | 0 | 0 |
| 607 | Onllwyn Brace | England | 21 January 1956 | 9 | 1 | 0 | 0 | 0 |
| 608 | Cowboy Davies | England | 21 January 1956 | 3 | 2 | 0 | 0 | 0 |
| 609 | Harry Morgan | England | 21 January 1956 | | | | | |
| 610 | Ray Prosser | Scotland | 4 February 1956 | 22 | 1 | 0 | 0 | 0 |
| 611 | Rex Richards | France | 24 March 1956 | 1 | 0 | 0 | 0 | 0 |
| 612 | Geoff Whitson | France | 24 March 1956 | | | | | |
| 613 | Geoff Howells | England | 19 January 1957 | | | | | |
| 614 | Keith Maddocks | England | 19 January 1957 | | | | | |
| 615 | Rory O'Connor | England | 19 January 1957 | | | | | |
| 616 | Robin Davies | Scotland | 2 February 1957 | | | | | |
| 617 | Lloyd Williams | Scotland | 2 February 1957 | 13 | 0 | 0 | 0 | 0 |
| 618 | Cyril Davies | Ireland | 9 March 1957 | | | | | |
| 619 | John Faull | Ireland | 9 March 1957 | | | | | |
| 620 | Henry Morgan | Ireland | 9 March 1957 | | | | | |
| 621 | Graham Powell | Ireland | 9 March 1957 | | | | | |
| 622 | John Collins | Australia | 4 January 1958 | | | | | |
| 623 | Don Devereux | Australia | 4 January 1958 | 3 | 0 | 0 | 0 | 0 |
| 624 | Wynne Evans | Australia | 4 January 1958 | | | | | |
| 625 | Roddy Evans | Australia | 4 January 1958 | 13 | 0 | 0 | 0 | 0 |
| 626 | Carwyn James | Australia | 4 January 1958 | 2 | 0 | 0 | 0 | 1 |
| 627 | Haydn Morgan | England | 18 January 1958 | 27 | 3 | 0 | 0 | 0 |
| 628 | John Evans | Ireland | 15 March 1958 | | | | | |
| 629 | Howard Nicholls | Ireland | 15 March 1958 | 1 | 0 | 0 | 0 | 0 |
| 630 | Alun Priday | Ireland | 15 March 1958 | | | | | |
| 631 | Cyril Roberts | Ireland | 15 March 1958 | | | | | |
| 632 | Cliff Ashton | England | 17 January 1959 | | | | | |
| 633 | Dewi Bebb | England | 17 January 1959 | 34 | 11 | 0 | 0 | 0 |
| 634 | Haydn Davies | England | 17 January 1959 | | | | | |
| 635 | Ian Ford | England | 17 January 1959 | | | | | |
| 636 | John Leleu | England | 17 January 1959 | | | | | |
| 637 | Derrick Main | England | 17 January 1959 | | | | | |
| 638 | Malcolm Price | England | 17 January 1959 | | | | | |
| 639 | Danny Harris | Ireland | 14 March 1959 | | | | | |
| 640 | Glyn Davidge | France | 4 April 1959 | 9 | 0 | 0 | 0 | 0 |
| 641 | Jack Hurrell | France | 4 April 1959 | 1 | 0 | 0 | 0 | 0 |
| 642 | Billy Watkins | France | 4 April 1959 | | | | | |
| 643 | Brian Cresswell | England | 16 January 1960 | | | | | |
| 644 | Len Cunningham | England | 16 January 1960 | | | | | |
| 645 | Colin Evans | England | 16 January 1960 | | | | | |
| 646 | Gareth Payne | England | 16 January 1960 | | | | | |
| 647 | Geoff Windsor-Lewis | England | 16 January 1960 | | | | | |
| 648 | Fenton Coles | Scotland | 6 February 1960 | | | | | |
| 649 | Norman Morgan | Scotland | 6 February 1960 | | | | | |
| 650 | Norman Gale | Ireland | 12 March 1960 | 25 | 1 | 0 | 1 | 0 |
| 651 | Brian Jones | Ireland | 12 March 1960 | 2 | 0 | 0 | 0 | 0 |
| 652 | Bryan Richards | France | 26 March 1960 | | | | | |
| 653 | Denis Evans | South Africa | 3 December 1960 | | | | | |
| 654 | Kingsley Jones | South Africa | 3 December 1960 | 10 | 0 | 0 | 0 | 0 |
| 655 | David Nash | South Africa | 3 December 1960 | 6 | 0 | 0 | 0 | 0 |
| 656 | Tony O'Connor | South Africa | 3 December 1960 | | | | | |
| 657 | Ken Richards | South Africa | 3 December 1960 | | | | | |
| 658 | Meirion Roberts | South Africa | 3 December 1960 | | | | | |
| 659 | Phil Morgan | England | 21 January 1961 | | | | | |
| 660 | Peter M. Rees | England | 21 January 1961 | | | | | |
| 661 | Gordon Britton | Scotland | 11 February 1961 | | | | | |
| 662 | Brian Price | Ireland | 11 March 1961 | 32 | 0 | 0 | 0 | 0 |
| 663 | Dave Thomas | Ireland | 11 March 1961 | | | | | |
| 664 | Haydn Mainwaring | France | 25 March 1961 | | | | | |
| 665 | Alun Pask | France | 25 March 1961 | 26 | 2 | 0 | 0 | 0 |
| 666 | Billy Thomas | France | 25 March 1961 | | | | | |
| 667 | Kel Coslett | England | 20 January 1962 | | | | | |
| 668 | Ken Jones | England | 20 January 1962 | | | | | |
| 669 | Robert Morgan | England | 20 January 1962 | | | | | |
| 670 | Alan Rees | England | 20 January 1962 | | | | | |
| 671 | Des Greenslade | Scotland | 3 February 1962 | | | | | |
| 672 | Keith Rowlands | France | 24 March 1962 | | | | | |
| 673 | Brian Davies | Ireland | 17 November 1962 | | | | | |
| 674 | John Davies | Ireland | 17 November 1962 | 1 | 0 | 0 | 0 | 0 |
| 675 | Grahame Hodgson | Ireland | 17 November 1962 | | | | | |
| 676 | John Warlow | Ireland | 17 November 1962 | | | | | |
| 677 | David Hayward | England | 19 January 1963 | 6 | 1 | 0 | 0 | 0 |
| 678 | Roger Michaelson | England | 19 January 1963 | | | | | |
| 679 | Clive Rowlands | England | 19 January 1963 | 14 | 0 | 0 | 0 | 1 |
| 680 | Brian Thomas | England | 19 January 1963 | | | | | |
| 681 | David Watkins | England | 19 January 1963 | | | | | |
| 682 | Denzil Williams | England | 19 January 1963 | | | | | |
| 683 | Ron Evans | Scotland | 2 February 1963 | | | | | |
| 684 | Graham Jones | Scotland | 2 February 1963 | | | | | |
| 685 | Bill Morris | Scotland | 2 February 1963 | | | | | |
| 686 | Howard Norris | France | 23 March 1963 | | | | | |
| 687 | Alan Thomas | New Zealand | 21 December 1963 | | | | | |
| 688 | Dick Uzzell | New Zealand | 21 December 1963 | | | | | |
| 689 | Keith Bradshaw | England | 18 January 1964 | 9 | 1 | 6 | 7 | 0 |
| 690 | John Mantle | England | 18 January 1964 | | | | | |
| 691 | David Weaver | England | 18 January 1964 | | | | | |
| 692 | Gareth Prothero | Scotland | 1 February 1964 | | | | | |
| 693 | Stuart Watkins | Scotland | 1 February 1964 | | | | | |
| 694 | John Dawes | Ireland | 7 March 1964 | | | | | |
| 695 | Terry Price | England | 16 January 1965 | | | | | |
| 696 | Ron Waldron | England | 16 January 1965 | | | | | |
| 697 | Bill Morris | Scotland | 6 February 1965 | 2 | 0 | 0 | 0 | 0 |
| 698 | Lyn Davies | England | 15 January 1966 | | | | | |
| 699 | Allan Lewis | England | 15 January 1966 | | | | | |
| 700 | John Lloyd | England | 15 January 1966 | | | | | |
| 701 | Ken Braddock | Australia | 3 December 1966 | | | | | |
| 702 | Gerald Davies | Australia | 3 December 1966 | 46 | 20 | 0 | 0 | 0 |
| 703 | Barry John | Australia | 3 December 1966 | 25 | 5 | 6 | 13 | 8 |
| 704 | Delme Thomas | Australia | 3 December 1966 | 25 | 0 | 0 | 0 | 0 |
| 705 | Billy Hullin | Scotland | 4 February 1967 | 1 | 0 | 0 | 0 | 0 |
| 706 | Billy Mainwaring | Scotland | 4 February 1967 | 6 | 0 | 0 | 0 | 0 |
| 707 | John O'Shea | Scotland | 4 February 1967 | 5 | 0 | 0 | 0 | 0 |
| 708 | Billy Raybould | Scotland | 4 February 1967 | 11 | 0 | 0 | 0 | 1 |
| 709 | Brian Rees | Scotland | 4 February 1967 | | | | | |
| 710 | John Taylor | Scotland | 4 February 1967 | 26 | 4 | 3 | 2 | 0 |
| 711 | Gareth Edwards | France | 1 April 1967 | 53 | 20 | 2 | 1 | 3 |
| 712 | Ron Jones | France | 1 April 1967 | | | | | |
| 713 | Dai Morris | France | 1 April 1967 | 34 | 6 | 0 | 0 | 0 |
| 714 | Keith Jarrett | England | 15 April 1967 | 10 | 2 | 17 | 11 | 0 |
| 715 | Ian Hall | New Zealand | 11 November 1967 | 8 | 0 | 0 | 0 | 0 |
| 716 | Dennis Hughes | New Zealand | 11 November 1967 | 6 | 0 | 0 | 0 | 0 |
| 717 | John Jeffery | New Zealand | 11 November 1967 | 1 | 0 | 0 | 0 | 0 |
| 718 | Keri Jones | New Zealand | 11 November 1967 | 5 | 2 | 0 | 0 | 0 |
| 719 | Paul Wheeler | New Zealand | 11 November 1967 | 2 | 0 | 0 | 0 | 0 |
| 720 | Max Wiltshire | New Zealand | 11 November 1967 | 4 | 0 | 0 | 0 | 0 |
| 721 | Tony Gray | England | 20 January 1968 | | | | | |
| 722 | Boyo James | England | 20 January 1968 | | | | | |
| 723 | Bobby Wanbon | England | 20 January 1968 | | | | | |
| 724 | Doug Rees | Scotland | 3 February 1968 | | | | | |
| 725 | Jeff Young | Scotland | 3 February 1968 | | | | | |
| 726 | Ian Jones | Ireland | 9 March 1968 | | | | | |
| 727 | Maurice Richards | Ireland | 9 March 1968 | 9 | 7 | 0 | 0 | 0 |
| 728 | Mervyn Davies | Scotland | 1 February 1969 | 38 | 2 | 0 | 0 | 0 |
| 729 | J. P. R. Williams | Scotland | 1 February 1969 | 55 | 6 | 2 | 3 | 0 |
| 730 | Phil Bennett | France | 22 March 1969 | 29 | 4 | 18 | 36 | 2 |
| 731 | Geoff Evans | South Africa | 24 January 1970 | | | | | |
| 732 | Barry Llewelyn | South Africa | 24 January 1970 | | | | | |
| 733 | Vic Perrins | South Africa | 24 January 1970 | | | | | |
| 734 | Laurie Daniel | Scotland | 7 February 1970 | | | | | |
| 735 | Chico Hopkins | England | 28 February 1970 | 1 | 1 | 0 | 0 | 0 |
| 736 | Keith Hughes | Ireland | 14 March 1970 | | | | | |
| 737 | Stuart Gallacher | France | 4 April 1970 | | | | | |
| 738 | Arthur Lewis | France | 4 April 1970 | | | | | |
| 739 | Roy Mathias | France | 4 April 1970 | | | | | |
| 740 | Jim Shanklin | France | 4 April 1970 | | | | | |
| 741 | John Bevan | England | 16 January 1971 | 10 | 5 | 0 | 0 | 0 |
| 742 | Mike Roberts | England | 16 January 1971 | | | | | |
| 743 | Roy Bergiers | England | 15 January 1972 | | | | | |
| 744 | Derek Quinnell | France | 25 March 1972 | | | | | |
| 745 | Glyn Shaw | New Zealand | 2 December 1972 | | | | | |
| 746 | Phil Llewellyn | Ireland | 10 March 1973 | | | | | |
| 747 | Tommy David | France | 24 March 1973 | 4 | 0 | 0 | 0 | 0 |
| 748 | J. J. Williams | France | 24 March 1973 | 30 | 12 | 0 | 0 | 0 |
| 749 | Allan Martin | Australia | 10 November 1973 | | | | | |
| 750 | Bobby Windsor | Australia | 10 November 1973 | 28 | 1 | 0 | 0 | 0 |
| 751 | Clive Shell | Australia | 10 November 1973 | 1 | 0 | 0 | 0 | 0 |
| 752 | Terry Cobner | Scotland | 19 January 1974 | 19 | 2 | 0 | 0 | 0 |
| 753 | Alex Finlayson | Ireland | 2 February 1974 | | | | | |
| 754 | Clive Rees | Ireland | 2 February 1974 | | | | | |
| 755 | Geoff Wheel | Ireland | 2 February 1974 | 32 | 0 | 0 | 0 | 0 |
| 756 | Walter Williams | Ireland | 2 February 1974 | 2 | 0 | 0 | 0 | 0 |
| 757 | Ian Robinson | France | 16 February 1974 | | | | | |
| 758 | Roger Blyth | England | 16 March 1974 | | | | | |
| 759 | John Bevan | France | 18 January 1975 | 4 | 0 | 0 | 0 | 1 |
| 760 | Trefor Evans | France | 18 January 1975 | 10 | 2 | 0 | 0 | 0 |
| 761 | Charlie Faulkner | France | 18 January 1975 | 19 | 1 | 0 | 0 | 0 |
| 762 | Steve Fenwick | France | 18 January 1975 | 30 | 4 | 11 | 35 | 3 |
| 763 | Ray Gravell | France | 18 January 1975 | 23 | 1 | 0 | 0 | 0 |
| 764 | Graham Price | France | 18 January 1975 | 41 | 2 | 0 | 0 | 0 |
| 765 | Mike Knill | France | 6 March 1976 | 1 | 0 | 0 | 0 | 0 |
| 766 | David Burcher | Ireland | 15 January 1977 | 4 | 0 | 0 | 0 | 0 |
| 767 | Clive Burgess | Ireland | 15 January 1977 | 9 | 1 | 0 | 0 | 0 |
| 768 | Jeff Squire | Ireland | 15 January 1977 | 29 | 3 | 0 | 0 | 0 |
| 769 | Gareth Evans | France | 5 February 1977 | | | | | |
| 770 | Clive Williams | England | 5 March 1977 | | | | | |
| 771 | Gareth Davies | Australia | 11 June 1978 | | | | | |
| 772 | Brynmor Williams | Australia | 11 June 1978 | | | | | |
| 773 | Stuart Lane | Australia | 11 June 1978 | | | | | |
| 774 | Clive Davis | Australia | 17 June 1978 | | | | | |
| 775 | Alun Donovan | Australia | 17 June 1978 | | | | | |
| 776 | Terry Holmes | Australia | 17 June 1978 | | | | | |
| 777 | John Richardson | Australia | 17 June 1978 | | | | | |
| 778 | Paul Ringer | New Zealand | 11 November 1978 | | | | | |
| 779 | Elgan Rees | Scotland | 20 January 1979 | | | | | |
| 780 | Barry Clegg | France | 17 February 1979 | | | | | |
| 781 | David Richards | France | 17 February 1979 | | | | | |
| 782 | Alan Phillips | England | 17 March 1979 | | | | | |
| 783 | Clive Griffiths | England | 17 March 1979 | | | | | |
| 784 | Eddie Butler | France | 19 January 1980 | | | | | |
| 785 | Les Keen | France | 19 January 1980 | | | | | |
| 786 | Peter Morgan | Scotland | 1 March 1980 | | | | | |
| 787 | Rob Ackerman | New Zealand | 1 November 1980 | | | | | |
| 788 | Gareth Williams | New Zealand | 1 November 1980 | | | | | |
| 789 | Rhodri Lewis | England | 17 January 1981 | | | | | |
| 790 | David Nicholas | England | 17 January 1981 | | | | | |
| 791 | Ian Stephens | England | 17 January 1981 | | | | | |
| 792 | Gwyn Evans | Scotland | 7 February 1981 | | | | | |
| 793 | Gary Pearce | Ireland | 21 February 1981 | | | | | |
| 794 | Gerald Williams | Ireland | 21 February 1981 | | | | | |
| 795 | Pat Daniels | Australia | 5 December 1981 | | | | | |
| 796 | Mark Davies | Australia | 5 December 1981 | | | | | |
| 797 | Richard Moriarty | Australia | 5 December 1981 | | | | | |
| 798 | Steve Sutton | France | 6 February 1982 | | | | | |
| 799 | Bob Norster | Scotland | 20 March 1982 | | | | | |
| 800 | Malcolm Dacey | England | 5 February 1983 | | | | | |
| 801 | Billy James | England | 5 February 1983 | | | | | |
| 802 | David Pickering | England | 5 February 1983 | | | | | |
| 803 | Mark Ring | England | 5 February 1983 | | | | | |
| 804 | Mark Wyatt | England | 5 February 1983 | | | | | |
| 805 | Ian Eidman | Scotland | 19 February 1983 | | | | | |
| 806 | Staff Jones | Scotland | 19 February 1983 | | | | | |
| 807 | John Perkins | Scotland | 19 February 1983 | | | | | |
| 808 | Richard Donovan | France | 19 March 1983 | | | | | |
| 809 | Bleddyn Bowen | Romania | 12 November 1983 | | | | | |
| 810 | Mark Brown | Romania | 12 November 1983 | | | | | |
| 811 | Ray Giles | Romania | 12 November 1983 | | | | | |
| 812 | Adrian Hadley | Romania | 12 November 1983 | | | | | |
| 813 | Terry Shaw | Romania | 12 November 1983 | | | | | |
| 814 | Mark Titley | Romania | 12 November 1983 | | | | | |
| 815 | Howell Davies | Scotland | 21 January 1984 | 4 | 1 | 4 | 9 | 0 |
| 816 | Mark Douglas | Scotland | 21 January 1984 | | | | | |
| 817 | Rhys Morgan | Scotland | 21 January 1984 | 1 | 0 | 0 | 0 | 0 |
| 818 | Mike Watkins | Ireland | 4 February 1984 | | | | | |
| 819 | David Bishop | Australia | 24 November 1984 | | | | | |
| 820 | Alun Davies | Australia | 24 November 1984 | | | | | |
| 821 | Phil Lewis | Australia | 24 November 1984 | | | | | |
| 822 | Jeff Whitefoot | Australia | 24 November 1984 | | | | | |
| 823 | Martyn Morris | Scotland | 2 March 1985 | | | | | |
| 824 | Stuart Evans | France | 30 March 1985 | | | | | |
| 825 | Paul Thorburn | France | 30 March 1985 | 37 | 2 | 43 | 70 | 0 |
| 826 | Gareth Roberts | France | 30 March 1985 | 7 | 3 | 0 | 0 | 0 |
| 827 | Jonathan Davies | England | 20 April 1985 | 37 | 5 | 2 | 6 | 13 |
| 828 | Phil Davies | England | 20 April 1985 | | | | | |
| 829 | Kevin Hopkins | England | 20 April 1985 | | | | | |
| 830 | John Devereux | England | 18 January 1986 | 21 | 5 | 0 | 0 | 0 |
| 831 | Robert Jones | England | 18 January 1986 | 54 | 4 | 0 | 0 | 0 |
| 832 | David Waters | England | 18 January 1986 | | | | | |
| 833 | Paul Moriarty | Ireland | 15 February 1986 | | | | | |
| 834 | Huw Richards | Tonga | 12 June 1986 | | | | | |
| 835 | Glen Webbe | Tonga | 12 June 1986 | 10 | 4 | 0 | 0 | 0 |
| 836 | Ieuan Evans | France | 7 February 1987 | 72 | 33 | 0 | 0 | 0 |
| 837 | Kevin Phillips | France | 7 February 1987 | 20 | 0 | 0 | 0 | 0 |
| 838 | Richie Collins | England | 7 March 1987 | 28 | 2 | 0 | 0 | 0 |
| 839 | Peter Francis | Scotland | 21 March 1987 | | | | | |
| 840 | Mark Jones | Scotland | 21 March 1987 | | | | | |
| 841 | Steve Blackmore | Ireland | 4 April 1987 | 4 | 0 | 0 | 0 | 0 |
| 842 | Anthony Buchanan | Tonga | 29 May 1987 | | | | | |
| 843 | Dai Young | England | 8 June 1987 | 51 | 1 | 0 | 0 | 0 |
| 844 | Richard Webster | Australia | 18 June 1987 | | | | | |
| 845 | Rowland Phillips | United States | 7 November 1987 | | | | | |
| 846 | Jeremy Pugh | United States | 7 November 1987 | | | | | |
| 847 | Stuart Russell | United States | 7 November 1987 | | | | | |
| 848 | Tony Clement | United States | 7 November 1987 | 37 | 3 | 0 | 0 | 1 |
| 849 | Phil May | England | 6 February 1988 | | | | | |
| 850 | Ian Watkins | England | 6 February 1988 | 10 | 1 | 0 | 0 | 0 |
| 851 | David Bryant | New Zealand | 28 May 1988 | | | | | |
| 852 | Tim Fauvel | New Zealand | 28 May 1988 | | | | | |
| 853 | Mike Hall | New Zealand | 28 May 1988 | | | | | |
| 854 | Nigel Davies | New Zealand | 11 June 1988 | | | | | |
| 855 | Jonathan Griffiths | New Zealand | 11 June 1988 | | | | | |
| 856 | Gary Jones | New Zealand | 11 June 1988 | | | | | |
| 857 | Kevin Moseley | New Zealand | 11 June 1988 | | | | | |
| 858 | Jonathan Mason | New Zealand | 11 June 1988 | | | | | |
| 859 | Carwyn Davies | Samoa | 12 November 1988 | | | | | |
| 860 | Mike Griffiths | Samoa | 12 November 1988 | | | | | |
| 861 | Wayne Hall | Samoa | 12 November 1988 | | | | | |
| 862 | John Wakeford | Samoa | 12 November 1988 | | | | | |
| 863 | Richard Wintle | Samoa | 12 November 1988 | | | | | |
| 864 | Richard Diplock | Romania | 10 December 1988 | | | | | |
| 865 | Hugh Williams-Jones | Scotland | 21 January 1989 | | | | | |
| 866 | Laurance Delaney | Ireland | 4 February 1989 | | | | | |
| 867 | Paul Turner | Ireland | 4 February 1989 | 3 | 0 | 0 | 0 | 0 |
| 868 | David Evans | France | 18 February 1989 | 12 | 0 | 0 | 0 | 2 |
| 869 | Arthur Emyr Jones | England | 18 March 1989 | | | | | |
| 870 | Gareth Llewellyn | New Zealand | 4 November 1989 | 92 | 5 | 0 | 0 | 0 |
| 871 | Phil Pugh | New Zealand | 4 November 1989 | 1 | 0 | 0 | 0 | 0 |
| 872 | Andy Allen | France | 20 January 1990 | 3 | 0 | 0 | 0 | 0 |
| 873 | Allan Bateman | Scotland | 3 March 1990 | 35 | 10 | 0 | 0 | 0 |
| 874 | Mark Perego | Scotland | 3 March 1990 | 9 | 0 | 0 | 0 | 0 |
| 875 | Brian Williams | Scotland | 3 March 1990 | | | | | |
| 876 | Steve Ford | Ireland | 24 March 1990 | 8 | 8 | 0 | 0 | 0 |
| 877 | Alan Edmunds | Ireland | 24 March 1990 | | | | | |
| 878 | Paul Arnold | Namibia | 2 June 1990 | | | | | |
| 879 | Chris Bridges | Namibia | 2 June 1990 | | | | | |
| 880 | Paul Knight | Namibia | 2 June 1990 | | | | | |
| 881 | Glyn Llewellyn | Namibia | 2 June 1990 | | | | | |
| 882 | Alan Reynolds | Namibia | 2 June 1990 | | | | | |
| 883 | Stuart Parfitt | Namibia | 2 June 1990 | | | | | |
| 884 | Owain Williams | Namibia | 9 June 1990 | | | | | |
| 885 | Aled Williams | Namibia | 9 June 1990 | | | | | |
| 886 | Adrian Davies | Barbarians | 6 October 1990 | | | | | |
| 887 | Alun Carter | England | 19 January 1991 | | | | | |
| 888 | Glen George | England | 19 January 1991 | | | | | |
| 889 | Scott Gibbs | England | 19 January 1991 | 53 | 10 | 0 | 0 | 0 |
| 890 | Neil Jenkins | England | 19 January 1991 | 87 | 11 | 130 | 235 | 10 |
| 891 | John Davies | Ireland | 16 February 1991 | 34 | 1 | 0 | 0 | 0 |
| 892 | Emyr Lewis | Ireland | 16 February 1991 | 41 | 3 | 0 | 0 | 0 |
| 893 | Mark Davis | Australia | 22 July 1991 | | | | | |
| 894 | Garin Jenkins | France | 4 September 1991 | 58 | 2 | 0 | 0 | 0 |
| 895 | Luc Evans | France | 4 September 1991 | | | | | |
| 896 | Ken Waters | Samoa | 6 October 1991 | | | | | |
| 897 | Mike Rayer | Samoa | 6 October 1991 | | | | | |
| 898 | Tony Copsey | Ireland | 18 January 1992 | | | | | |
| 899 | Stuart Davies | Ireland | 18 January 1992 | 17 | 2 | 0 | 0 | 0 |
| 900 | Colin Stephens | Ireland | 18 January 1992 | | | | | |
| 901 | Roger Bidgood | Scotland | 21 March 1992 | | | | | |
| 902 | Wayne Proctor | Australia | 21 November 1992 | 39 | 11 | 0 | 0 | 0 |
| 903 | Ricky Evans | England | 6 February 1993 | | | | | |
| 904 | Nigel Meek | England | 6 February 1993 | | | | | |
| 905 | Nigel Walker | Ireland | 6 March 1993 | 17 | 12 | 0 | 0 | 0 |
| 906 | Andrew Lamerton | France | 20 March 1993 | | | | | |
| 907 | Rupert Moon | France | 20 March 1993 | | | | | |
| 908 | Simon Hill | Zimbabwe | 22 May 1993 | | | | | |
| 909 | Lyn Jones | Zimbabwe | 22 May 1993 | | | | | |
| 910 | Neil Boobyer | Zimbabwe | 22 May 1993 | | | | | |
| 911 | Scott Quinnell | Canada | 10 November 1993 | 52 | 11 | 0 | 0 | 0 |
| 912 | Hemi Taylor | Portugal | 18 May 1994 | | | | | |
| 913 | Robin McBryde | Fiji | 18 June 1994 | | | | | |
| 914 | Ian Buckett | Tonga | 22 June 1994 | | | | | |
| 915 | Paul John | Tonga | 22 June 1994 | | | | | |
| 916 | Gwilym Wilkins | Tonga | 22 June 1994 | | | | | |
| 917 | Steve Williams | Tonga | 22 June 1994 | | | | | |
| 918 | Derwyn Jones | South Africa | 26 November 1994 | | | | | |
| 919 | Mark Taylor | South Africa | 26 November 1994 | 52 | 12 | 0 | 0 | 0 |
| 920 | Mathew Back | France | 21 January 1995 | | | | | |
| 921 | Spencer John | Scotland | 4 March 1995 | | | | | |
| 922 | Andrew Gibbs | Ireland | 18 March 1995 | | | | | |
| 923 | Andrew Moore | Japan | 27 May 1995 | | | | | |
| 924 | Gareth Thomas | Japan | 27 May 1995 | 100 | 40 | 0 | 0 | 0 |
| 925 | Stuart Roy | Japan | 27 May 1995 | | | | | |
| 926 | Mark Bennett | New Zealand | 31 May 1995 | | | | | |
| 927 | Jonathan Humphreys | New Zealand | 31 May 1995 | 35 | 2 | 0 | 0 | 0 |
| 928 | Greg Prosser | New Zealand | 31 May 1995 | | | | | |
| 929 | Gareth Jones | South Africa | 2 September 1995 | | | | | |
| 930 | Christian Loader | South Africa | 2 September 1995 | | | | | |
| 931 | Justin Thomas | South Africa | 2 September 1995 | | | | | |
| 932 | Andy Moore | South Africa | 2 September 1995 | | | | | |
| 933 | Lyndon Mustoe | Fiji | 11 November 1995 | | | | | |
| 934 | Craig Quinnell | Fiji | 11 November 1995 | | | | | |
| 935 | Leigh Davies | Italy | 16 January 1996 | | | | | |
| 936 | Gwyn Jones | Italy | 16 January 1996 | 13 | 1 | 0 | 0 | 0 |
| 937 | Andrew Lewis | Italy | 16 January 1996 | | | | | |
| 938 | Arwel Thomas | Italy | 16 January 1996 | 23 | 11 | 30 | 32 | 0 |
| 939 | Matthew Wintle | Italy | 16 January 1996 | | | | | |
| 940 | Rob Howley | England | 3 February 1996 | 59 | 10 | 0 | 0 | 0 |
| 941 | Mike Voyle | Australia | 9 June 1996 | | | | | |
| 942 | Dafydd James | Australia | 22 June 1996 | 48 | 15 | 0 | 0 | 0 |
| 943 | Kingsley Jones | Barbarians | 24 August 1996 | 10 | 0 | 0 | 0 | 0 |
| 944 | Martyn Williams | Barbarians | 24 August 1996 | 100 | 14 | 0 | 0 | 1 |
| 945 | Barry Williams | France | 25 September 1996 | | | | | |
| 946 | Colin Charvis | Australia | 1 December 1996 | 94 | 22 | 0 | 0 | 0 |
| 947 | Dale McIntosh | South Africa | 15 December 1996 | | | | | |
| 948 | Mark Rowley | South Africa | 15 December 1996 | | | | | |
| 949 | Nathan Thomas | South Africa | 15 December 1996 | | | | | |
| 950 | Kevin Morgan | United States | 5 July 1997 | 48 | 12 | 0 | 0 | 0 |
| 951 | Chris Anthony | United States | 5 July 1997 | | | | | |
| 952 | Rob Appleyard | Canada | 19 July 1997 | | | | | |
| 953 | Steve Moore | Canada | 19 July 1997 | | | | | |
| 954 | Lee Jarvis | Romania | 30 August 1997 | | | | | |
| 955 | Gareth Wyatt | Tonga | 16 November 1997 | 2 | 1 | 0 | 0 | 0 |
| 956 | Chris Stephens | England | 21 February 1998 | | | | | |
| 957 | Darren Morris | Zimbabwe | 6 June 1998 | | | | | |
| 958 | Richard Rees | Zimbabwe | 6 June 1998 | | | | | |
| 959 | David Weatherley | Zimbabwe | 6 June 1998 | | | | | |
| 960 | John Funnell | Zimbabwe | 6 June 1998 | | | | | |
| 961 | Byron Hayward | Zimbabwe | 6 June 1998 | 2 | 3 | 0 | 0 | 0 |
| 962 | Chris Wyatt | Zimbabwe | 6 June 1998 | | | | | |
| 963 | Garan Evans | South Africa | 27 June 1998 | | | | | |
| 964 | Ian Gough | South Africa | 27 June 1998 | 64 | 1 | 0 | 0 | 0 |
| 965 | Stephen Jones | South Africa | 27 June 1998 | 104 | 6 | 117 | 138 | 5 |
| 966 | Geraint Lewis | South Africa | 27 June 1998 | | | | | |
| 967 | David Llewellyn | South Africa | 27 June 1998 | | | | | |
| 968 | Darril Williams | South Africa | 27 June 1998 | | | | | |
| 969 | Shane Howarth | South Africa | 14 November 1998 | | | | | |
| 970 | Ben Evans | South Africa | 14 November 1998 | | | | | |
| 971 | Matthew Robinson | Scotland | 6 February 1999 | | | | | |
| 972 | Peter Rogers | France | 6 March 1999 | | | | | |
| 973 | Brett Sinkinson | France | 6 March 1999 | | | | | |
| 974 | Nick Walne | Italy | 20 March 1999 | | | | | |
| 975 | Jason Jones-Hughes | Argentina | 1 October 1999 | | | | | |
| 976 | Richard Smith | France | 5 February 2000 | | | | | |
| 977 | Shane Williams | France | 5 February 2000 | 87 | 58 | 0 | 0 | 0 |
| 978 | Nathan Budgett | Scotland | 18 March 2000 | 12 | 2 | 0 | 0 | 0 |
| 979 | Matt Cardey | Scotland | 18 March 2000 | 1 | 0 | 0 | 0 | 0 |
| 980 | Rhys Williams | Ireland | 1 April 2000 | 44 | 18 | 0 | 0 | 0 |
| 981 | Deiniol Jones | Samoa | 11 November 2000 | 7 | 0 | 0 | 0 | 0 |
| 982 | Iestyn Thomas | Samoa | 11 November 2000 | | | | | |
| 983 | James Griffiths | Samoa | 11 November 2000 | | | | | |
| 984 | Mark Jones | England | 3 February 2001 | 47 | 13 | 0 | 0 | 0 |
| 985 | Gareth Cooper | Italy | 8 April 2001 | 46 | 9 | 0 | 0 | 0 |
| 986 | Adrian Durston | Japan | 10 June 2001 | | | | | |
| 987 | Andy Lloyd | Japan | 10 June 2001 | | | | | |
| 988 | Gavin Thomas | Japan | 10 June 2001 | | | | | |
| 989 | Gavin Henson | Japan | 10 June 2001 | | | | | |
| 990 | Steve Jones | Japan | 10 June 2001 | | | | | |
| 991 | Jamie Ringer | Japan | 10 June 2001 | | | | | |
| 992 | Jamie Robinson | Japan | 10 June 2001 | | | | | |
| 993 | Tom Shanklin | Japan | 17 June 2001 | 70 | 20 | 0 | 0 | 0 |
| 994 | Dwayne Peel | Japan | 17 June 2001 | 76 | 5 | 0 | 0 | 0 |
| 995 | Iestyn Harris | Argentina | 10 November 2001 | | | | | |
| 996 | Anthony Sullivan | Argentina | 10 November 2001 | | | | | |
| 997 | Duncan Jones | Australia | 25 November 2001 | 57 | 0 | 0 | 0 | 0 |
| 998 | Craig Morgan | Ireland | 3 February 2002 | | | | | |
| 999 | Andy Marinos | Ireland | 3 February 2002 | 8 | 1 | 0 | 0 | 0 |
| 1000 | Michael Owen | South Africa | 8 June 2002 | 41 | 2 | 0 | 0 | 0 |
| 1001 | Mefin Davies | South Africa | 8 June 2002 | 39 | 2 | 0 | 0 | 0 |
| 1002 | Martyn Madden | South Africa | 8 June 2002 | 5 | 0 | 0 | 0 | 0 |
| 1003 | Richard Parks | South Africa | 8 June 2002 | 4 | 0 | 0 | 0 | 0 |
| 1004 | Ryan Powell | South Africa | 8 June 2002 | 3 | 0 | 0 | 0 | 0 |
| 1005 | Robert Sidoli | South Africa | 8 June 2002 | 42 | 2 | 0 | 0 | 0 |
| 1006 | Gethin Jenkins | Romania | 1 November 2002 | 129 | 4 | 0 | 0 | 0 |
| 1007 | Sonny Parker | Romania | 1 November 2002 | 31 | 6 | 0 | 0 | 0 |
| 1008 | Dafydd Jones | Fiji | 9 November 2002 | 42 | 2 | 0 | 0 | 0 |
| 1009 | Vernon Cooper | Canada | 16 November 2002 | 3 | 0 | 0 | 0 | 0 |
| 1010 | Ceri Sweeney | Italy | 15 February 2003 | 35 | 4 | 25 | 5 | 1 |
| 1011 | Matthew Watkins | Italy | 15 February 2003 | 18 | 0 | 0 | 0 | 0 |
| 1012 | Gareth Williams | Italy | 15 February 2003 | 9 | 0 | 0 | 0 | 0 |
| 1013 | Jonathan Thomas | Australia | 14 June 2003 | 67 | 7 | 0 | 0 | 0 |
| 1014 | Alix Popham | Australia | 14 June 2003 | 33 | 4 | 0 | 0 | 0 |
| 1015 | Rhys Oakley | Ireland | 16 August 2003 | 2 | 0 | 0 | 0 | 0 |
| 1016 | Nicky Robinson | Ireland | 16 August 2003 | 13 | 2 | 7 | 5 | 1 |
| 1017 | Huw Bennett | Ireland | 16 August 2003 | 51 | 0 | 0 | 0 | 0 |
| 1018 | Adam R. Jones | England | 23 August 2003 | 95 | 2 | 0 | 0 | 0 |
| 1019 | Nathan Brew | Romania | 27 August 2003 | 1 | 1 | 0 | 0 | 0 |
| 1020 | Brent Cockbain | Romania | 27 August 2003 | 24 | 1 | 0 | 0 | 0 |
| 1021 | Paul James | Romania | 27 August 2003 | 60 | 0 | 0 | 0 | 0 |
| 1022 | Mike Phillips | Romania | 27 August 2003 | 94 | 9 | 0 | 0 | 0 |
| 1023 | James Bater | Romania | 27 August 2003 | 1 | 0 | 0 | 0 | 0 |
| 1024 | Jon Bryant | Romania | 27 August 2003 | 1 | 0 | 0 | 0 | 0 |
| 1025 | Andy Williams | Romania | 27 August 2003 | 5 | 0 | 0 | 0 | 0 |
| 1026 | Paul Young | Romania | 27 August 2003 | 1 | 0 | 0 | 0 | 0 |
| 1027 | Hal Luscombe | Scotland | 30 August 2003 | 16 | 2 | 0 | 0 | 0 |
| 1028 | Jason Forster | Argentina | 12 June 2004 | 1 | 1 | 0 | 0 | 0 |
| 1029 | Ryan Jones | South Africa | 6 November 2004 | 75 | 2 | 0 | 0 | 0 |
| 1030 | Luke Charteris | South Africa | 6 November 2004 | 55 | 0 | 0 | 0 | 0 |
| 1031 | John Yapp | England | 5 February 2005 | 21 | 0 | 0 | 0 | 0 |
| 1032 | Robin Sowden-Taylor | Italy | 12 February 2005 | 8 | 0 | 0 | 0 | 0 |
| 1033 | Matthew Rees | United States | 4 June 2005 | 60 | 2 | 0 | 0 | 0 |
| 1034 | Ben Broster | United States | 4 June 2005 | 2 | 1 | 0 | 0 | 0 |
| 1035 | Richie Pugh | United States | 4 June 2005 | 1 | 1 | 0 | 0 | 0 |
| 1036 | Tal Selley | United States | 4 June 2005 | 1 | 1 | 0 | 0 | 0 |
| 1037 | T. Rhys Thomas | United States | 4 June 2005 | 27 | 1 | 0 | 0 | 0 |
| 1038 | Chris Czekaj | Canada | 11 June 2005 | 9 | 2 | 0 | 0 | 0 |
| 1039 | Matthew Jones | Canada | 11 June 2005 | 1 | 0 | 0 | 0 | 0 |
| 1040 | Lee Byrne | New Zealand | 5 November 2005 | 46 | 10 | 0 | 0 | 0 |
| 1041 | Chris Horsman | New Zealand | 5 November 2005 | 14 | 1 | 0 | 0 | 0 |
| 1042 | Adam M. Jones | England | 4 February 2006 | 2 | 0 | 0 | 0 | 0 |
| 1043 | Gareth Delve | Scotland | 12 February 2006 | 11 | 1 | 0 | 0 | 0 |
| 1044 | Barry Davies | Ireland | 26 February 2006 | 1 | 0 | 0 | 0 | 0 |
| 1045 | Ian Evans | Argentina | 11 June 2006 | 33 | 1 | 0 | 0 | 0 |
| 1046 | Alun Wyn Jones | Argentina | 11 June 2006 | 138 | 8 | 0 | 0 | 0 |
| 1047 | Richard Hibbard | Argentina | 11 June 2006 | 37 | 1 | 0 | 0 | 0 |
| 1048 | James Hook | Argentina | 11 June 2006 | 77 | 13 | 45 | 61 | 4 |
| 1049 | Rhys M. Thomas | Argentina | 17 June 2006 | 7 | 0 | 0 | 0 | 0 |
| 1050 | Gavin Evans | Pacific Islanders | 11 November 2006 | 1 | 0 | 0 | 0 | 0 |
| 1051 | Aled Brew | Ireland | 4 February 2007 | 9 | 3 | 0 | 0 | 0 |
| 1052 | Ceri Jones | Australia | 26 May 2007 | 2 | 0 | 0 | 0 | 0 |
| 1053 | Scott Morgan | Australia | 2 June 2007 | 1 | 0 | 0 | 0 | 0 |
| 1054 | Will James | England | 4 August 2007 | 4 | 0 | 0 | 0 | 0 |
| 1055 | Tom James | England | 4 August 2007 | 10 | 2 | 0 | 0 | 0 |
| 1056 | Morgan Stoddart | South Africa | 24 November 2007 | 8 | 5 | 0 | 0 | 0 |
| 1057 | Jamie Roberts | Scotland | 9 February 2008 | 94 | 11 | 0 | 0 | 0 |
| 1058 | Warren Fury | South Africa | 7 June 2008 | 2 | 0 | 0 | 0 | 0 |
| 1059 | Andrew Bishop | South Africa | 14 June 2008 | 16 | 0 | 0 | 0 | 0 |
| 1060 | Leigh Halfpenny | South Africa | 8 November 2008 | 60 | 12 | 34 | 118 | 0 |
| 1061 | Andy Powell | South Africa | 8 November 2008 | 23 | 1 | 0 | 0 | 0 |
| 1062 | Martin Roberts | Canada | 14 November 2008 | 3 | 0 | 0 | 0 | 0 |
| 1063 | Dan Biggar | Canada | 14 November 2008 | 33 | 1 | 26 | 26 | 5 |
| 1064 | Eifion Lewis-Roberts | Canada | 14 November 2008 | 1 | 0 | 0 | 0 | 0 |
| 1065 | Bradley Davies | Scotland | 8 February 2009 | 45 | 0 | 0 | 0 | 0 |
| 1066 | Jonathan Davies | Canada | 30 May 2009 | 48 | 10 | 0 | 0 | 0 |
| 1067 | Dan Evans | Canada | 30 May 2009 | 2 | 0 | 0 | 0 | 0 |
| 1068 | Craig Mitchell | Canada | 30 May 2009 | 15 | 1 | 0 | 0 | 0 |
| 1069 | Jonathan Spratt | Canada | 30 May 2009 | 4 | 0 | 0 | 0 | 0 |
| 1070 | Sam Warburton | United States | 6 June 2009 | 54 | 4 | 0 | 0 | 0 |
| 1071 | Dan Lydiate | Argentina | 21 November 2009 | 46 | 0 | 0 | 0 | 0 |
| 1072 | Richie Rees | England | 6 February 2010 | 9 | 1 | 0 | 0 | 0 |
| 1073 | Rhys Gill | Ireland | 13 March 2010 | 6 | 0 | 0 | 0 | 0 |
| 1074 | Tom Prydie | Italy | 20 March 2010 | 5 | 2 | 0 | 0 | 0 |
| 1075 | Rob McCusker | South Africa | 5 June 2010 | 6 | 0 | 0 | 0 | 0 |
| 1076 | Tavis Knoyle | New Zealand | 19 June 2010 | 11 | 0 | 0 | 0 | 0 |
| 1077 | Will Harries | New Zealand | 26 June 2010 | 3 | 0 | 0 | 0 | 0 |
| 1078 | George North | South Africa | 13 November 2010 | 100 | 30 | 0 | 0 | 0 |
| 1079 | Rhys Priestland | Scotland | 12 February 2011 | 34 | 1 | 14 | 9 | 0 |
| 1080 | Josh Turnbull | Scotland | 12 February 2011 | 7 | 0 | 0 | 0 | 0 |
| 1081 | Ryan Bevington | Barbarians | 4 June 2011 | 13 | 0 | 0 | 0 | 0 |
| 1082 | Taulupe Faletau | Barbarians | 4 June 2011 | 45 | 4 | 0 | 0 | 0 |
| 1083 | Scott Andrews | Barbarians | 4 June 2011 | 11 | 0 | 0 | 0 | 0 |
| 1084 | Lloyd Burns | Barbarians | 4 June 2011 | 7 | 1 | 0 | 0 | 0 |
| 1085 | Scott Williams | Barbarians | 4 June 2011 | 29 | 9 | 0 | 0 | 0 |
| 1086 | Justin Tipuric | Argentina | 20 August 2011 | 31 | 0 | 0 | 0 | 0 |
| 1087 | Lloyd Williams | Argentina | 20 August 2011 | 18 | 2 | 0 | 0 | 0 |
| 1088 | Ken Owens | Namibia | 26 September 2011 | 27 | 2 | 0 | 0 | 0 |
| 1089 | Alex Cuthbert | Australia | 3 December 2011 | 32 | 14 | 0 | 0 | 0 |
| 1090 | Aaron Shingler | Scotland | 12 February 2012 | 8 | 0 | 0 | 0 | 0 |
| 1091 | Lou Reed | Scotland | 12 February 2012 | 5 | 0 | 0 | 0 | 0 |
| 1092 | Rhys Webb | Italy | 10 March 2012 | 14 | 5 | 0 | 0 | 0 |
| 1093 | Rhodri Jones | Barbarians | 2 June 2012 | 13 | 0 | 0 | 0 | 0 |
| 1094 | Harry Robinson | Barbarians | 2 June 2012 | 3 | 2 | 0 | 0 | 0 |
| 1095 | Liam Williams | Barbarians | 2 June 2012 | 23 | 2 | 0 | 0 | 0 |
| 1096 | Adam Warren | Barbarians | 2 June 2012 | 1 | 0 | 0 | 0 | 0 |
| 1097 | Ashley Beck | Australia | 9 June 2012 | 7 | 2 | 0 | 0 | 0 |
| 1098 | Aaron Jarvis | Argentina | 10 November 2012 | 10 | 0 | 0 | 0 | 0 |
| 1099 | Andrew Coombs | Ireland | 2 February 2013 | 10 | 0 | 0 | 0 | 0 |
| 1100 | Olly Kohn | Ireland | 2 February 2013 | 1 | 0 | 0 | 0 | 0 |
| 1101 | Dafydd Howells | Japan | 8 June 2013 | 2 | 0 | 0 | 0 | 0 |
| 1102 | James King | Japan | 8 June 2013 | 3 | 0 | 0 | 0 | 0 |
| 1103 | Emyr Phillips | Japan | 8 June 2013 | 3 | 0 | 0 | 0 | 0 |
| 1104 | Owen Williams | Japan | 8 June 2013 | 4 | 1 | 0 | 0 | 0 |
| 1105 | Dan Baker | Japan | 8 June 2013 | 2 | 0 | 0 | 0 | 0 |
| 1106 | Rhys Patchell | Japan | 8 June 2013 | 2 | 0 | 0 | 1 | 0 |
| 1107 | Andries Pretorius | Japan | 8 June 2013 | 2 | 0 | 0 | 0 | 0 |
| 1108 | Josh Navidi | Japan | 15 June 2013 | 33 | 1 | 0 | 0 | 0 |
| 1109 | Scott Baldwin | Japan | 15 June 2013 | 9 | 0 | 0 | 0 | 0 |
| 1110 | Cory Allen | Argentina | 16 November 2013 | 2 | 0 | 0 | 0 | 0 |
| 1111 | Samson Lee | Argentina | 16 November 2013 | 12 | 0 | 0 | 0 | 0 |
| 1112 | Hallam Amos | Tonga | 22 November 2013 | 1 | 0 | 0 | 0 | 0 |
| 1113 | Rhodri Williams | Tonga | 22 November 2013 | 3 | 1 | 0 | 0 | 0 |
| 1114 | Jake Ball | Ireland | 8 February 2014 | 12 | 0 | 0 | 0 | 0 |
| 1115 | Gareth Davies | South Africa | 14 June 2014 | 14 | 7 | 0 | 0 | 0 |
| 1116 | Matthew Morgan | South Africa | 14 June 2014 | 1 | 0 | 0 | 0 | 0 |
| 1117 | Nicky Smith | Fiji | 15 November 2014 | 2 | 0 | 0 | 0 | 0 |
| 1118 | Rob Evans | Ireland | 14 March 2015 | 2 | 0 | 0 | 0 | 0 |
| 1119 | Dominic Day | Ireland | 8 August 2015 | 1 | 0 | 0 | 0 | 0 |
| 1120 | Ross Moriarty | Ireland | 8 August 2015 | 1 | 0 | 0 | 0 | 0 |
| 1121 | Eli Walker | Ireland | 8 August 2015 | 1 | 0 | 0 | 0 | 0 |
| 1122 | Tyler Morgan | Ireland | 8 August 2015 | 1 | 0 | 0 | 0 | 0 |
| 1123 | Kristian Dacey | Ireland | 8 August 2015 | 1 | 0 | 0 | 0 | 0 |
| 1124 | Gareth Anscombe | Ireland | 8 August 2015 | 1 | 0 | 0 | 0 | 0 |
| 1125 | Tomas Francis | Ireland | 29 August 2015 | 1 | 0 | 0 | 0 | 0 |
| 1126 | Ellis Jenkins | New Zealand | 11 June 2016 | 2 | 0 | 0 | 0 | 0 |
| 1127 | Cory Hill | Australia | 5 November 2016 | 1 | 0 | 0 | 0 | 0 |
| 1128 | Sam Davies | Australia | 5 November 2016 | 1 | 0 | 0 | 0 | 0 |
| 1129 | Seb Davies | Tonga | 16 June 2017 | 2 | 0 | 0 | 0 | 0 |
| 1130 | Thomas Young | Tonga | 16 June 2017 | 2 | 0 | 0 | 0 | 0 |
| 1131 | Steff Evans | Tonga | 16 June 2017 | 2 | 2 | 0 | 0 | 0 |
| 1132 | Wyn Jones | Tonga | 16 June 2017 | 2 | 0 | 0 | 0 | 0 |
| 1133 | Ryan Elias | Tonga | 16 June 2017 | 2 | 0 | 0 | 0 | 0 |
| 1134 | Dillon Lewis | Tonga | 16 June 2017 | 2 | 0 | 0 | 0 | 0 |
| 1135 | Ollie Griffiths | Tonga | 16 June 2017 | 1 | 0 | 0 | 0 | 0 |
| 1136 | Aled Davies | Tonga | 16 June 2017 | 2 | 0 | 0 | 0 | 0 |
| 1137 | Owen Williams | Tonga | 16 June 2017 | 1 | 0 | 0 | 0 | 0 |
| 1138 | Rory Thornton | Samoa | 23 June 2017 | 1 | 0 | 0 | 0 | 0 |
| 1139 | Adam Beard | Samoa | 23 June 2017 | 1 | 0 | 0 | 0 | 0 |
| 1140 | Owen Watkin | Australia | 11 November 2017 | 2 | 0 | 0 | 0 | 0 |
| 1141 | Leon Brown | Australia | 11 November 2017 | 2 | 0 | 0 | 0 | 0 |
| 1142 | Sam Cross | Australia | 11 November 2017 | 2 | 0 | 0 | 0 | 0 |
| 1143 | Elliot Dee | Georgia | 18 November 2017 | 1 | 0 | 0 | 0 | 0 |
| 1144 | Hadleigh Parkes | South Africa | 2 December 2017 | 1 | 0 | 0 | 0 | 0 |
| 1145 | Josh Adams | Scotland | 3 February 2018 | 1 | 0 | 0 | 0 | 0 |
| 1146 | Tomos Williams | South Africa | 2 June 2018 | 1 | 0 | 0 | 0 | 0 |
| 1147 | James Davies | Argentina | 9 June 2018 | 1 | 0 | 0 | 0 | 0 |
| 1148 | Aaron Wainwright | Argentina | 9 June 2018 | 1 | 0 | 0 | 0 | 0 |
| 1149 | Luke Morgan | Scotland | 3 November 2018 | 1 | 0 | 0 | 0 | 0 |
| 1150 | Jarrod Evans | Scotland | 3 November 2018 | 1 | 0 | 0 | 0 | 0 |
| 1151 | Jonah Holmes | Tonga | 17 November 2018 | 1 | 0 | 0 | 0 | 0 |
| 1152 | Rhys Carré | Ireland | 31 August 2019 | 1 | 0 | 0 | 0 | 0 |
| 1153 | Owen Lane | Ireland | 31 August 2019 | 1 | 0 | 0 | 0 | 0 |
| 1154 | Johnny McNicholl | Italy | 1 February 2020 | 1 | 0 | 0 | 0 | 0 |
| 1155 | Nick Tompkins | Italy | 1 February 2020 | 1 | 1 | 0 | 0 | 0 |
| 1156 | Will Rowlands | France | 22 February 2020 | 1 | 0 | 0 | 0 | 0 |
| 1157 | Sam Parry | France | 24 October 2020 | 1 | 0 | 0 | 0 | 0 |
| 1158 | Louis Rees-Zammit | France | 24 October 2020 | 1 | 0 | 0 | 0 | 0 |
| 1159 | Shane Lewis-Hughes | Scotland | 31 October 2020 | 1 | 0 | 0 | 0 | 0 |
| 1160 | Callum Sheedy | Ireland | 13 November 2020 | 1 | 0 | 0 | 0 | 0 |
| 1161 | James Botham | Georgia | 21 November 2020 | 1 | 0 | 0 | 0 | 0 |
| 1162 | Kieran Hardy | Georgia | 21 November 2020 | 1 | 0 | 0 | 0 | 0 |
| 1163 | Johnny Williams | Georgia | 21 November 2020 | 1 | 0 | 0 | 0 | 0 |
| 1164 | Ioan Lloyd | Georgia | 21 November 2020 | 1 | 0 | 0 | 0 | 0 |
| 1165 | Willis Halaholo | Scotland | 13 February 2021 | 1 | 0 | 0 | 0 | 0 |
| 1166 | Ben Carter | Canada | 3 July 2021 | 1 | 0 | 0 | 0 | 0 |
| 1167 | Tom Rogers | Canada | 3 July 2021 | 1 | 0 | 0 | 0 | 0 |
| 1168 | Gareth Thomas | Canada | 3 July 2021 | 1 | 0 | 0 | 0 | 0 |
| 1169 | Taine Basham | Canada | 3 July 2021 | 1 | 2 | 0 | 0 | 0 |
| 1170 | Ben Thomas | Canada | 3 July 2021 | 1 | 0 | 2 | 0 | 0 |
| 1171 | Matthew Screech | Argentina | 17 July 2021 | 1 | 0 | 0 | 0 | 0 |
| 1172 | Kirby Myhill | New Zealand | 30 October 2021 | 1 | 0 | 0 | 0 | 0 |
| 1173 | WillGriff John | South Africa | 6 November 2021 | 1 | 0 | 0 | 0 | 0 |
| 1174 | Bradley Roberts | South Africa | 6 November 2021 | 1 | 0 | 0 | 0 | 0 |
| 1175 | Christ Tshiunza | Fiji | 14 November 2021 | 1 | 0 | 0 | 0 | 0 |
| 1176 | Dewi Lake | Ireland | 5 February 2022 | 1 | 0 | 0 | 0 | 0 |
| 1177 | Jac Morgan | Scotland | 12 February 2022 | 1 | 0 | 0 | 0 | 0 |
| 1178 | Tommy Reffell | South Africa | 3 July 2022 | 4 | 0 | 0 | 0 | 0 |
| 1179 | Sam Wainwright | South Africa | 9 July 2022 | 2 | 0 | 0 | 0 | 0 |
| 1180 | Rio Dyer | New Zealand | 5 November 2022 | 1 | 1 | 0 | 0 | 0 |
| 1181 | Sam Costelow | New Zealand | 5 November 2022 | 1 | 0 | 0 | 0 | 0 |
| 1182 | Josh Macleod | Georgia | 19 November 2022 | 1 | 0 | 0 | 0 | 0 |
| 1183 | Dafydd Jenkins | Georgia | 19 November 2022 | 1 | 0 | 0 | 0 | 0 |
| 1184 | Joe Hawkins | Australia | 26 November 2022 | 1 | 0 | 0 | 0 | 0 |
| 1185 | Rhys Davies | Scotland | 11 February 2023 | 1 | 0 | 0 | 0 | 0 |
| 1186 | Mason Grady | England | 25 February 2023 | 1 | 0 | 0 | 0 | 0 |
| 1187 | Corey Domachowski | England | 5 August 2023 | 1 | 0 | 0 | 0 | 0 |
| 1188 | Keiron Assiratti | England | 5 August 2023 | 1 | 0 | 0 | 0 | 0 |
| 1189 | Max Llewellyn | England | 5 August 2023 | 1 | 0 | 0 | 0 | 0 |
| 1190 | Taine Plumtree | England | 5 August 2023 | 2 | 0 | 0 | 0 | 0 |
| 1191 | Henry Thomas | England | 5 August 2023 | 1 | 0 | 0 | 0 | 0 |
| 1192 | Joe Roberts | England | 12 August 2023 | 1 | 0 | 0 | 0 | 0 |
| 1193 | Kemsley Mathias | England | 12 August 2023 | 1 | 0 | 0 | 0 | 0 |
| 1194 | Keiran Williams | England | 12 August 2023 | 1 | 0 | 0 | 0 | 0 |
| 1195 | Cai Evans | South Africa | 19 August 2023 | 1 | 0 | 0 | 0 | 0 |
| 1196 | Teddy Williams | South Africa | 19 August 2023 | 1 | 0 | 0 | 0 | 0 |
| 1197 | Cameron Winnett | Scotland | 3 February 2024 | 1 | 0 | 0 | 0 | 0 |
| 1198 | Alex Mann | Scotland | 3 February 2024 | 1 | 1 | 0 | 0 | 0 |
| 1199 | Archie Griffin | England | 10 February 2024 | 1 | 0 | 0 | 0 | 0 |
| 1200 | Mackenzie Martin | Ireland | 24 February 2024 | 1 | 0 | 0 | 0 | 0 |
| 1201 | Evan Lloyd | France | 10 March 2024 | 1 | 0 | 0 | 0 | 0 |
| 1202 | Harri O'Connor | Italy | 16 March 2024 | 1 | 0 | 0 | 0 | 0 |
| 1203 | Ellis Bevan | South Africa | 22 June 2024 | 1 | 0 | 0 | 0 | 0 |
| 1204 | James Ratti | South Africa | 22 June 2024 | 1 | 0 | 0 | 0 | 0 |
| 1205 | Jacob Beetham | South Africa | 22 June 2024 | 1 | 0 | 0 | 0 | 0 |
| 1206 | Eddie James | South Africa | 22 June 2024 | 1 | 0 | 0 | 0 | 0 |
| 1207 | Josh Hathaway | Australia | 6 July 2024 | 1 | 0 | 0 | 0 | 0 |
| 1208 | Blair Murray | Fiji | 10 November 2024 | 1 | 0 | 0 | 0 | 0 |
| 1209 | Freddie Thomas | South Africa | 23 November 2024 | 1 | 0 | 0 | 0 | 0 |
| 1210 | Dan Edwards | France | 31 January 2025 | 1 | 0 | 0 | 0 | 0 |
| 1211 | Ellis Mee | Ireland | 22 February 2025 | 1 | 0 | 0 | 0 | 0 |
| 1212 | Liam Belcher | Japan | 5 July 2025 | 1 | 0 | 0 | 0 | 0 |
| 1213 | Keelan Giles | Japan | 12 July 2025 | 1 | 0 | 0 | 0 | 0 |
| 1214 | Christian Coleman | Japan | 12 July 2025 | 1 | 0 | 0 | 0 | 0 |
| 1215 | Reuben Morgan-Williams | Japan | 12 July 2025 | 1 | 0 | 0 | 0 | 0 |
| 1216 | Olly Cracknell | Argentina | 9 November 2025 | 1 | 0 | 0 | 0 | 0 |
| 1217 | Harri Deaves | New Zealand | 22 November 2025 | 1 | 0 | 0 | 0 | 0 |
| 1218 | Morgan Morse | New Zealand | 22 November 2025 | 1 | 0 | 0 | 0 | 0 |
| 1219 | Brodie Coghlan | New Zealand | 22 November 2025 | 1 | 0 | 0 | 0 | 0 |
| 1220 | Danny Southworth | South Africa | 29 November 2025 | 1 | 0 | 0 | 0 | 0 |
| 1221 | Gabriel Hamer-Webb | Scotland | 21 February 2026 | 1 | 0 | 0 | 0 | 0 |
| 1222 | Louie Hennessey | Ireland | 6 March 2026 | 1 | 0 | 0 | 0 | 0 |
| 1223 | Ben Warren | Fiji | 5 July 2026 | 1 | 0 | 0 | 0 | 0 |
| 1224 | Kane James | Argentina | 11 July 2026 | 1 | 0 | 0 | 0 | 0 |

== See also ==
- List of Wales national rugby union team captains
