= Arnold Rickards =

- Full name: Arnold Robert Rickards
- Born: 17 August 1901 Falfield, Gloucestershire, England
- Died: 18 June 1966 (aged 64) Cardiff, Wales

Rugby union career
- Position: Lock
International career
Years	Team	Apps	(Points)
1924	Wales	1	(3)

Arnold Robert Rickards (17 August 1901 — 18 June 1966) was a Welsh international rugby union player.

Born in Falfield, Gloucestershire, Rickards was a forward who played for Cardiff, Pontnewydd and Pontypool.

Rickards gained a Wales cap in 1924, deputising for Jack Whitfield for their Five Nations match against France at Colombes, scoring a try to help secure a 10–6 win. The match was played in difficult, muddy conditions, with two of the French players suffering frostbite. He also played against the 1924–25 All Blacks while representing Gloucestershire.

== See also ==
- List of Wales national rugby union players
