= Howell John =

- Full name: John Howell John
- Born: 31 August 1898 Swansea, Wales
- Died: 30 March 1977 (aged 78) Morriston, Wales

Rugby union career
- Position: Hooker
International career
Years	Team	Apps	(Points)
1926–27	Wales	8	(0)

John Howell John (31 August 1898 – 30 March 1977) was a Welsh international rugby union player.

While playing for Swansea, John was capped in eight consecutive matches as a forward for Wales, across the 1926 and 1927 Five Nations Championships. He was a specialist hooker.

John, a police constable, played for Ystalyfera RFC in the 1930s after being posted to the Swansea Valley town.

== See also ==
- List of Wales national rugby union players
