= Mapson Williams =

Wales international rugby union player

- Full name: Mapson Thomas Williams
- Born: 5 April 1891 Mackay, Queensland, Australia
- Died: 13 July 1954 (aged 63) Wollongong, NSW, Australia
- School: Long Ashton School
- Occupation: Farmer

Rugby union career
- Position: Forward
International career
Years	Team	Apps	(Points)
1923	Wales	1	(0)

Mapson Thomas Williams (5 April 1891 – 13 July 1954) was an Australian–born Welsh international rugby union player.

== Biography ==
Williams was born in Mackay, Queensland, and moved with his family to a farm in Maesglas as a young child. He attended Long Ashton School in Bristol, where he played association football. In 1912, Williams made his debut in the firsts for Newport RFC, a club his father and two uncles had previously played for. His career was paused in World War I while he served in the Middle East with the Royal Gloucestershire Hussars.

A forward, Williams made 149 appearances in the first XV for Newport and also had a brief stint with Abertillery in the 1921–22 season. He was back with Newport when he gained his only Wales call up in 1923, for a Five Nations fixture against France at Swansea, before making the decision to return to Australia the following year.

== See also ==
- List of Wales national rugby union players
