= Daph Davies =

- Full name: David Horace Davies
- Born: 3 August 1898 Bridgend, Wales
- Died: 22 September 1967 (aged 69) Bridgend, Wales

Rugby union career
- Position: Three-quarter
International career
Years	Team	Apps	(Points)
1921–25	Wales	2	(0)

David Horace Davies (3 August 1898 – 22 September 1967) was a Welsh international rugby union player.

Born in Bridgend, Davies came from a family with a strong association to Bridgend RFC, as the son of ex–player Ned Davies and one of three siblings to play for the club. He was a three-quarter.

Davies was capped twice for Wales. He gained his first call up in 1921 for a match against Ireland at Belfast. Afterwards, Davies moved on to Cardiff RFC, but soon found himself out of their first XV and returned to Bridgend. He received a Wales recall in 1925 to play another fixture in Belfast. The following season, Davies took over as captain of Bridgend.

== See also ==
- List of Wales national rugby union players
