= Wynne Evans (rugby union) =

Welsh rugby union player

- Full name: Thomas Wynne Evans
- Born: 13 August 1926 Llandybie, Wales
- Died: 8 May 1987 (aged 60) Carmarthen, Wales

Rugby union career
- Position: Scrum-half
International career
Years	Team	Apps	(Points)
1958	Wales	1	(0)

Thomas Wynne Evans (13 August 1926 — 8 May 1987) was a Welsh international rugby union player.

A scrum-half from Llandybie, Evans played his rugby for Llanelli through the 1950s and captained the club in the 1956/1957 season. He won his solitary Wales cap as 31-year old against Australia at Cardiff Arms Park in 1958, partnering Llanelli teammate Carwyn James at half-back. Wales were victorious 9–3.

Evans became landlord of the Golden Grove Hotel in Llandybie and died at the age of 60 in 1987.

== See also ==
- List of Wales national rugby union players
