= Eddie Watkins (rugby, born 1899) =

- Full name: Edward Watkins
- Born: 27 March 1899 Neath, Wales
- Died: 12 October 1983 (aged 84) Neath, Wales

Rugby union career
- Position: Scrum-half
International career
| Years | Team | Apps | (Points) |
| 1924 | Wales | 4 | (4) |
- Rugby league career

Playing information
- Position: Scrum-half
Club
| Years | Team | Pld | T | G | FG | P |
|---|---|---|---|---|---|---|
| 1924–27 | Halifax | 109 | 11 | 2 | 0 | 37 |

Eddie Watkins (27 March 1899 – 12 October 1983) was a Welsh international rugby union player.

Born in Neath, Watkins was a nippy half–back of small stature known for his swift ball movement from the scrum and debuted for Neath RFC in 1919. He became the first Neath player to appear at scrum–half for Wales in 1924 and was the only member of the backline to play all four Five Nations fixtures that year. His Wales career ended later in 1924 when he signed a professional contract with rugby league club Halifax.

Watkins was later employed by Glamorgan County Council.

== See also ==
- List of Wales national rugby union players
