= William Radford (rugby union) =

- Full name: William John Radford
- Born: 8 April 1888 Cardiff, Wales
- Died: 2 January 1924 (aged 35) Newport, Wales
- Occupation: Dock worker

Rugby union career
- Position: Forward
International career
Years	Team	Apps	(Points)
1923	Wales	1	(0)

William John Radford (8 April 1888 – 2 January 1924) was a Welsh international rugby union player.

Radford was born in Cardiff and educated at Eveswell School.

A forward, Radford made over 100 appearances for Newport RFC and was capped once for Wales, appearing against Ireland at Lansdowne Road in 1923. He was the oldest player to debut for Wales at 34 years of age.

Radford was married with eight children and worked at the Ebbw Vale Wharf as a berth cleaner. On 2 January 1924, Radford drowned in a workplace accident, having slipped on a gangway while exiting a vessel.

== See also ==
- List of Wales national rugby union players
