= Leslie Davies (rugby union) =

- Born: 13 July 1913 Swansea, Wales
- Died: 4 September 1984 (aged 71) Swansea, Wales

Rugby union career
- Position: Forward
International career
Years	Team	Apps	(Points)
1939	Wales	2	(0)

Leslie Davies (13 July 1913 – 4 September 1984) was a Welsh international rugby union player.

Davies was a versatile Swansea RFC forward, who could play as a hooker, prop and second rower.

In 1939, Davies gained two Wales caps in the Home Nations. He was one of eight changes made to the line up after a loss to England, replacing Swansea clubmate Eddie Morgan, for matches against Scotland at Cardiff and Ireland at Belfast.

== See also ==
- List of Wales national rugby union players
