= 1933 Home Nations Championship =

International rugby union competition

- Date: 21 January - 1 April 1933
- Countries: England; Ireland; Scotland; Wales

Tournament statistics
- Champions: Scotland (10th title)
- Triple Crown: Scotland (7th title)
- Matches played: 6

The 1933 Home Nations Championship was the twenty-ninth series of the rugby union Home Nations Championship. Including the previous incarnations as the Five Nations, and prior to that, the Home Nations, this was the forty-sixth series of the northern hemisphere rugby union championship. Six matches were played between 21 January and 1 April. It was contested by England, Ireland, Scotland and Wales.

== Table ==
Pos	Team	Pld	W	D	L	PF	PA	PD	Pts
1	Scotland	3	3	0	0	22	9	+13	6
2	England	3	1	0	2	20	16	+4	2
2	Ireland	3	1	0	2	22	30	−8	2
2	Wales	3	1	0	2	15	24	−9	2

== Results ==
21 January 1933

England	3 – 7	Wales
Try: Elliot		Try: Boon; Drop: Boon

Twickenham, London
Referee: T Bell (Ireland)

England: T Brown (Bristol), L Booth (Headingley), D Burland (Bristol), R Gerrard (Bath), C Aarvold (Blackheath) (capt.), W Elliot (US Portsmouth), A Key (Old Cranleighans), R Longland (Northampton), G Gregory (Bristol), B Evans (US Portsmouth), C Webb (Devonport Services), A Roncoroni (Richmond), R Bolton (Wakefield), A Vaughan-Jones (US Portsmouth), B Black (Blackheath)

Wales: V Jenkins (Bridgend), R Boon (Cardiff), C Davey (Swansea), W Wooller (Rydal School), AH Jones (Cardiff), H Bowcott (London Welsh), M Turnbull (Cardiff), E Jones (Llanelli), B Evans (Llanelli), A Skym (Llanelli RFC), R Bark-Jones (Cambridge Univ.), D Thomas (Swansea), T Arthur (Neath), I Isaacs (Cardiff), W Thomas (Swansea) (capt.)

4 February 1933

Wales	3 – 11	Scotland
Try: Arthur		Try: Smith; Jackson; Con: Fyfe; Pen: Fyfe

St Helens, Swansea
Referee: JG Bott (England)

Wales: G Bayliss (Pontypool), A Hickman (Neath), C Davey (Swansea), W Wooller (Rydal School), AH Jones (Cardiff), R Morris (Swansea), DB Evans (Swansea), E Jones (Llanelli), B Evans (Llanelli), A Skym (Llanelli RFC), R Bark-Jones (Cambridge Univ.), D Thomas (Swansea), T Arthur (Neath), I Isaacs (Cardiff), W Thomas (Swansea) (capt.)

Scotland: D Brown (Cambridge Univ.), I Smith (London Scottish) (capt.), B Lorraine (Oxford Univ.), H Lind (Dunfermline), K Fyfe (Cambridge Univ.), K Jackson (Oxford Univ.), R Logan (Edinburgh Wanderers), J Waters (Selkirk), J Ritchie (Watsonians), J Thom (Watsonians), J Beattie (Hawick, M Stewart (Stewart's FP), W Welsh (Hawick), M Henderson (Edinburgh Acads), B Rowand (Glasgow HSFP)

11 February 1933

England	17 – 6	Ireland
Try: Novis (2); Booth; Gadney; Sadler; Con: Kendrew		Try: Hunt; Pen: Murray

Twickenham, London
Referee: MA Allan (Scotland)

11 March 1933

Ireland	10 – 5	Wales
Try: Barnes; Drop: Davy; Pen: Siggins		Try: Bowcott; Con: Jenkins

Ravenhill, Belfast
Referee: MA Allan (Scotland)

Ireland: R Pratt (Dublin Univ.), E Lightfoot (Landsdowne), M Crowe (Landsdowne), R Barnes (Dublin Univ.), S Waide (NIFC), E Davy (Landsdowne), P Murray (Wanderers), M Dunne (Landsdowne), V Pike (Landsdowne), H O'Neill (UC Cork), J Russell (UC Cork), J Siggins (Belfast Collegians), C Beamish (NIFC), G Beamish (Leicester) (capt.), W Ross (Queen's U. Belfast)

Wales: V Jenkins (Bridgend), F Williams (Cardiff), G Jones (Cardiff), W Wooller (Colwyn Bay), R Boon (Cardiff), H Bowcott (London Welsh), M Turnbull (Cardiff), E Jones (Llanelli), L Bowdler (Cross Keys), A Skym (Llanelli RFC), R Barrell (Cardiff), W Moore (Bridgend), L Rees (Cardiff), A Lemon (Neath), W Thomas (Swansea) (capt.)

18 March 1933

Scotland	3 – 0	England
Try: Fyfe

Murrayfield, Edinburgh
Referee: JR Wheeler (Republic of Ireland) (Ireland)

1 April 1933

Ireland	6 – 8	Scotland
Try: Crowe; Murray		Drop: Jackson; Lind

Lansdowne Road, Dublin
Referee: BS Cumberlege (England)
