= Arthur Jones =

Arthur Jones may refer to:

== Politics ==
- Arthur Jones, 2nd Viscount Ranelagh (died 1669), Irish politician
- Arthur Creech Jones (1891–1964), British trade unionist and politician, secretary of state for the colonies, 1946–1950
- Arthur Jones (Australian politician) (1892–1976), shearer and member of the Queensland Legislative Assembly
- Arthur Probyn Jones (1892–1951), British barrister and Liberal Party politician
- Arthur Jones (Conservative politician) (1915–1991), British member of parliament, 1962–1979
- Arthur L. Jones (1924–2003), American politician, member of the South Dakota House of Representatives
- Arthur J. Jones (born 1948), American neo-Nazi Republican congressional candidate

== Sports ==
- Arthur Jones (rugby union, born 1856) (1856–1919), Welsh rugby union player
- Arthur Jones (English cricketer) (1872–1914), England cricket captain and rugby union player
- Arthur Jones (Australian cricketer) (1874–1917), Australian cricketer
- Arthur Jones (footballer, born 1878) (1878–1939), English footballer
- Arthur Kenneth Jones (1887–1975), English badminton player
- Arthur Jones (footballer, born 1891) (1891–1915), Australian rules footballer
- Arthur Jones (footballer, born 1912) (1912–2002), Welsh footballer
- Arthur W. Jones (1891–1962), American college football, basketball, and baseball player and coach
- Arthur Jones (baseball) (fl. 1925–1926), American baseball player
- Arthur Jones (rugby union, born 1908) (1908–1964), Welsh rugby union player
- Arthur Vaughan Jones (1909–1987), Welsh-born England international rugby union player
- Arthur Jones (Nelson footballer) (fl. 1927–1928), English footballer who only made a single professional appearance for Nelson
- Arthur Jones (race walker) (1938–2023), British Olympic athlete
- Arthur Jones (American football) (1986–2025), American football defensive end
- Arthur Jones (footballer, born 2003), Australian rules footballer

== Other ==
- Arthur Llewellyn Jones (1863–1947), British author under the name Arthur Machen
- Arthur Duncan-Jones (1879–1955), British Anglican priest and author
- Arthur Morris Jones (1889–1980), British missionary and musicologist
- Arthur G. Jones-Williams (1898–1929), Welsh flying ace
- Arthur Frederick Jones (1903–1988), American writer and dog-show judge
- Arthur E. Jones, American architect
- Arthur Jones (inventor) (1926–2007), American inventor of the Nautilus exercise machines
- Arthur Jones (bishop) (1934–2021), Australian Anglican priest, bishop of Gippsland, 1994–2001
- Arthur Jones (saxophonist) (1940–1998), American jazz saxophonist
- Arthur C. Jones (born 1946), American clinical psychologist, educator, and music scholar
- Arthur R. Jones (born 1969), United States district judge
- Arthur Jones (film director) (born 1973), British film director

== See also ==
- Jones (surname)
- Art Jones (disambiguation)
