= Bernard Turnbull =

Wales international rugby union player

- Born: Bernard Ruel Turnbull; 16 October 1904 Cardiff, Wales
- Died: 7 April 1984 (aged 79) Lymington, England
- School: Downside School
- Notable relative(s): Maurice Turnbull, brother. Philip Turnbull, father. Bertrand Turnbull, cousin.

Rugby union career
- Position: Centre
Amateur team(s)
Years	Team	Apps	(Points)
- St. Peters RFC
1924-25	Cambridge University R.U.F.C.		
1924-1933	Cardiff RFC		
1925-1926	Barbarian F.C.		
International career
Years	Team	Apps	(Points)
1925–1930	Wales	6	(3)

Bernard Turnbull (16 October 1904 – 7 April 1984) was a Welsh international centre who played club rugby for Cardiff and was capped six times for Wales. Turnbull has been described as a dogged and unimaginative centre, but with the ability to finish off the work of others. Turnbull captained Wales on one occasion in 1927.

== Rugby career ==
Turnbull played rugby as a boy for St. Peters RFC, one of the smaller teams based in Cardiff, along with his brothers, Maurice and Kevin. Maurice would later play for Cardiff and like his brother would also represent Wales, though he is better known for representing England at cricket.

Bernard Turnbull was first selected to play for Wales against Ireland in the 1925 Five Nations Championship under the captaincy of Idris Jones. Wales were humiliated in the match, losing 19-3, in the biggest victory Ireland had achieved against Wales. Turnbull scored the only points for Wales with a try, his only international points. Turnbull missed the 1926 Championship, but was re-selected for the 1927 tournament and in the opening match against England was given the captaincy. In a tight game played at Twickenham, Wales lost narrowly 11-9, and even scored more tries than their opponents; a good feat considering they played three quarters of the match with 14 men after Dai Jones was injured in the first half. Turnbull played in the next game of the championship against Scotland, but for the third time found himself on a losing Welsh team.

Turnbull's next game was against England in the 1928 Five Nations Championship, in a game Wales should have won but for a slip by the normally reliable Rowe Harding. Turnbull was now on a match losing streak for Wales but his next game was against France, who had failed to beat Wales in the first 13 Championship encounters. Like the 1927 match against England, France was a 14-man team for the majority of the game after an early injury; therefore when Wales lost the game the result was an even bigger embarrassment. Turnbull was not selected for the 1929 Welsh season but was back in 1930 for his final game against Scotland at Murrayfield. Wales lost 12-9 and Turnbull ended his international career without experiencing a Welsh victory.

In 1931, Turnbull faced the touring South African team as part of the Cardiff team. Turnbull turned out with his brother Maurice and fellow Welsh internationals Ronnie Boon, Archie Skym and captain Harry Bowcott. Although Cardiff lost, sports journalist 'Old Stager' said: "B. R. Turnbull was the best centre on the field, ubiquitous in defence and valiant in attack."

=== International matches played ===
Wales

- England 1927, 1928
- France 1928
- Ireland 1925
- Scotland 1927, 1930

== Bibliography ==
- Billot, John (1974). Springboks in Wales. Ferndale: Ron Jones Publications.
- Goodwin, Terry (1984). The International Rugby Championship 1883-1983. London: Willows Books. ISBN 0-00-218060-X.
- Smith, David; Williams, Gareth (1980). Fields of Praise: The Official History of The Welsh Rugby Union. Cardiff: University of Wales Press. ISBN 0-7083-0766-3.
