= Iorwerth Isaac =

Wales dual-code rugby international footballer

Iorrie Isaac
- Born: Iorweth Isaac; 12 October 1911 Cilfynydd, Wales
- Died: 25 April 1966 (aged 54) Wrexham, Wales
- School: Pontypridd Grammar School
- Occupation(s): police officer headteacher

Rugby union career
- Position: Flanker
Amateur team(s)
Years	Team	Apps	(Points)
- Cilfynydd RFC
–	Cardiff RFC		
–	Glamorgan Police RFC		
–	Pontypridd RFC		
–	Penarth RFC		
International career
Years	Team	Apps	(Points)
1933	Wales	2	(0)
- Rugby league career

Playing information
- Position: Prop, Second-row
Club
Years	Team	Pld	T	G	FG	P
1933–36	Leeds	84	18	0	0	54
1936–38	York
1938–39	Hunslet	23	1	0	0	3
	Total	107	19	0	0	57
Representative
Years	Team	Pld	T	G	FG	P
1933–35	Wales	2				9

Iorwerth Isaac (12 October 1911 – 25 April 1966) commonly known as Iorrie Isaac, was a Welsh dual-code international rugby union, and professional rugby league footballer who played in the 1930s. He played representative rugby union (RU) for Wales, and at club level for Pontypridd and Cardiff, as a flanker, and representative rugby league (RL) for Wales, and at club level for Leeds, as a prop or second-row.

== Early life ==
Isaac was born in Cilfynydd, Wales. He attended Pontypridd Grammar School.

== Rugby career ==
=== Rugby union ===
Isaac was first selected for Wales in their opening game of the 1933 Home Nations Championship. The match was against England at their national stadium, Twickenham. Wales had failed to win at the ground in their first nine attempts, and the Welsh failure at the ground was known as the 'Twickenham bogey'. Isaac was placed at open-side flanker, opposite the veteran Tom Arthur who was positioned on the blind side. Isaac, along with Turnbull, and Arthur, continually spoiled the English scrum. When Isaac caused the English half-backs to loose the loose maul, Watcyn Thomas heeled the ball back for Wooller, and then Davey to feed Ronnie Boon who scored a Welsh try. The game ended 7–3, with all the Welsh points scored by Boon, who had also placed a drop goal. Isaacs played just one more international game in the very next match of the Home Nations Championship against Scotland at St. Helens, his international career identical to that of Raymond Bark-Jones.

=== Rugby league ===
At the start of the 1933–34 season, Isaac left rugby union behind when he "went North", switching to the professional rugby league game, joining Leeds. He scored a try in the club's 1935–36 Challenge Cup final victory against Warrington. He was transferred to York in November 1936. In 1938, he was signed by Hunslet.

Isaac won caps for Wales (RL) while at Leeds in 1933 against Australia, and 1935 against France.

== Bibliography ==
- Godwin, Terry (1984). The International Rugby Championship 1883–1983. London: Willows Books. ISBN 0-00-218060-X.
- Griffiths, Terry (1987). The Phoenix Book of International Rugby Records. London: Phoenix House. ISBN 0-460-07003-7.
- Smith, David; Williams, Gareth (1980). Fields of Praise: The Official History of The Welsh Rugby Union. Cardiff: University of Wales Press. ISBN 0-7083-0766-3.
