= James Cotter (rugby union) =

Scotland international rugby union player

- Born: James Logan Cotter; 6 January 1907 Motherwell, Scotland
- Died: 26 January 1991 (aged 84) Troon, Scotland

Rugby union career
- Position: Fly Half / Full Back
Amateur team(s)
Years	Team	Apps	(Points)
- Hillhead HSFP
Provincial / State sides
Years	Team	Apps	(Points)
1934	Scotland Possibles		
1934	Glasgow District		
International career
Years	Team	Apps	(Points)
1934	Scotland	2	(0)
Coaching career
- Years: Team
- -: Langholm

Rev. James Cotter (6 January 1907 – 26 January 1991) was a Scotland international rugby union player.

== Rugby Union career ==
=== Amateur career ===
He played for Hillhead HSFP.

=== Provincial career ===
Cotter was named in the Scotland Possibles side on 13 January 1934. Batting for selection, was his opponent on the Scotland Probables side Kenneth Jackson from Oxford University.

The Aberdeen Press and Journal noted that day:

Cotter is a player of exceptional merit, he has, indeed, that quality all-roundness which seems to characterise all great players. A grand fullback, clever centre, he is also an accomplished stand-off half. Jackson will require to be his best to outshine Cotter.

He captained Glasgow District in their 1934 inter-city match against Edinburgh District.

=== International career ===
He was capped by Scotland twice in 1934.

Cotter did well in his first game against Ireland. from 3 March 1934 issue of the Illustrated Sporting and Dramatic News:

The new outside half, Cotter, the young Glasgow clergyman, created a most favourable impression, hitting things off quite well in his first partnership with that splendid player Logan, and the Scots were much better served at centre, where Dick and Lind, especially the former, were in great form.

=== Coaching career ===
He went on to coach Langholm.

== Ecclesiastical career ==
Cotter became a minister in the Church of Scotland, a path worn by the Scotland rugby union international William Milne.

From the Dundee Courier of 3 October 1934:

DUNDEE MINISTER IN VACANCY VOTE Noted Rugby Player Appointed.
Rev. James L. Cotter, assistant of Glasgow Cathedral, was last night elected minister of the church and parish of Troon. He received 297 votes against 246 recorded in favour of Rev. McIntosh Mowat, of St John's Cross, Dundee. There were 21 votes against both of them. Mr Cotter is a noted rugby player. He turns out for Hillhead at full-back, and played stand-off for Scotland against England and Ireland last season. He is 28 years of age. Mr Mowat said to the Courier and Advertiser last night that he did not apply for Troon Church. Representatives of the church heard him while he was holidaying in Ayr, after which he was nominated. Mr Mowat agreed on condition that he was sole nominee. Recently when two names were put forward Mr Mowat desired to withdraw, but that was not done.

A biography of his life known as Tackling Life: A Biography of the Rev. James Logan Cotter by Logan Cotter was published in 2000.
