= Mac Cooper =

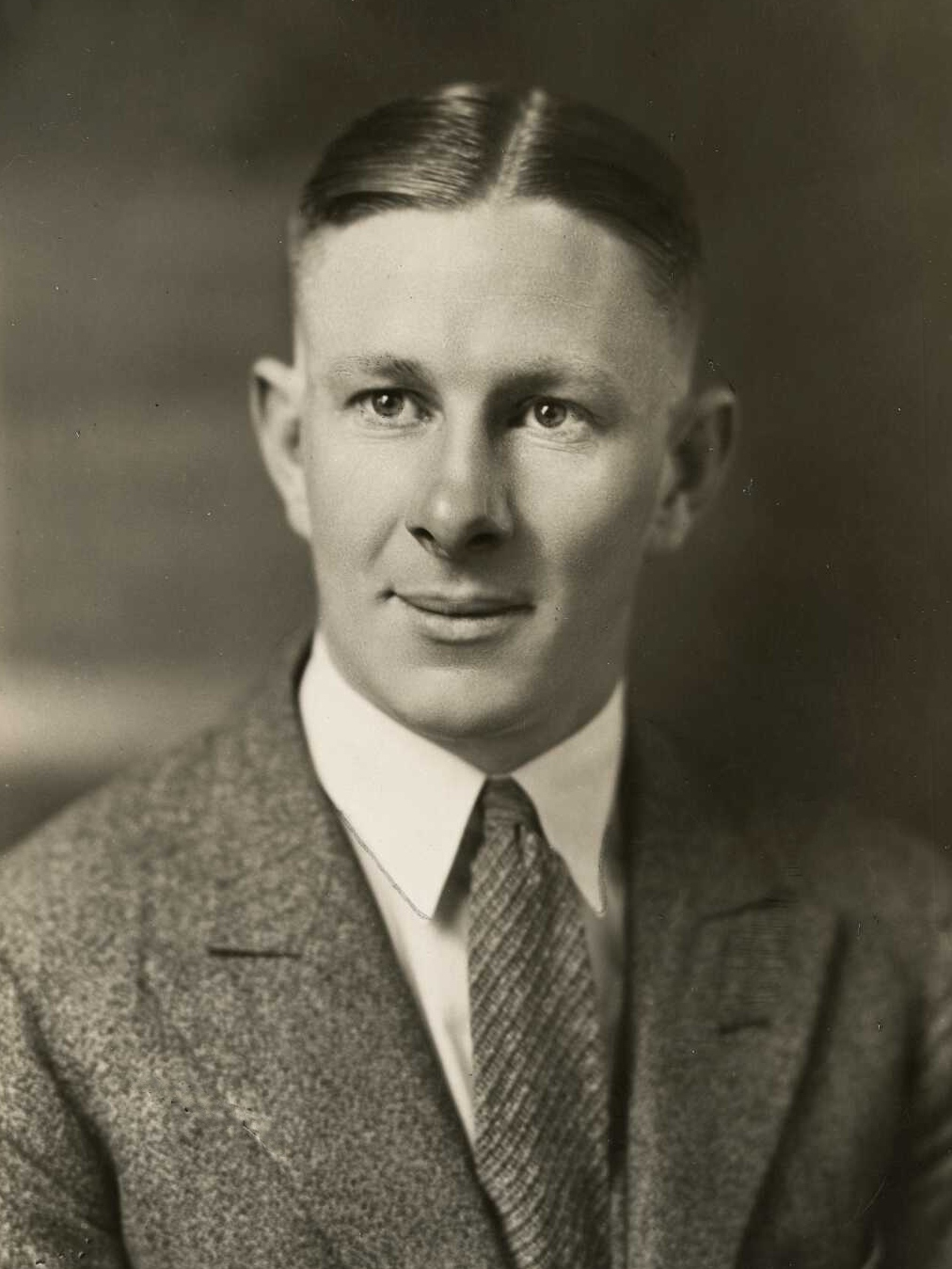
- Born: Malcolm McGregor Cooper; 17 August 1910 Havelock North, New Zealand
- Died: 1 September 1989 (aged 79) Longhoughton, England

Rugby union career
- Position: Flanker
Amateur team(s)
Years	Team	Apps	(Points)
-	Oxford University		
Provincial / State sides
Years	Team	Apps	(Points)
1934	Scotland Possibles		
1935-6	Scotland Probables		
International career
Years	Team	Apps	(Points)
1936	Scotland	2	(0)

Malcolm McGregor Cooper CBE FRSE (17 August 1910 – 1 September 1989), commonly known as Mac Cooper, was a New Zealand-born agriculturalist and author; also known for being a Scotland international rugby union player, at the Flanker position.

== Academic career ==
He was educated at Napier Boys' High School and then at Massey Agricultural College graduating a Bachelor in Agricultural Science in 1933. He then won a Rhodes Scholarship to Oxford University and obtained a Diploma in Rural Economy in 1935 and Bachelor of Literature in 1937. He married Hilary Margaret Cecilia Matthews in 1937.

From 1947 to 1954 he was Professor of Agriculture at Wye College. From 1954 until retiral in 1972 he was Dean of Agriculture and Professor of Rural Economy at the University of Newcastle upon Tyne.

He was president of the British Grassland Society and president of the British Society of Animal Production. The Food and Agriculture Organization of the United Nations described him as a giant of agriculture.

== Rugby Union career ==
=== Amateur career ===
Cooper played for Oxford University. He obtained 3 'Blues' playing against Cambridge University in 1935, 1936 and 1937.

=== Provincial career ===
He played for Scotland Possibles against Scotland Possibles on 15 December 1934.

He played for Scotland Probables against Scotland Possibles on 11 January 1936. He played again for the Probables in the following season, 19 December 1936.

=== International career ===
He was capped for Scotland twice in 1936.

== Military career ==
During the Second World War Cooper served in the New Zealand Military Forces in North Africa and Italy rising to the rank of Major. After the war he decided to stay in Britain to work.

== Family ==
He was born at Havelock North in New Zealand's Hawke's Bay on 17 August 1910, the son of Laurence Taylor Cooper (1872-1923), a farmer, and Sarah Ann McGregor (1869-1930). He was one of the couple's 7 children.

His mother Sarah was born in Dunedin; and she was the daughter of Malcolm McGregor (1837-1906) from Cromdale in Scotland.

Mac Cooper married Hilary Matthews in July 1937 in Oxford.

== Death ==
Cooper died on 1 September 1989.

== Honours and awards ==
Cooper was elected a Fellow of the Royal Society of Edinburgh in 1956, his proposers including David Cuthbertson, H. Cecil Pawson and Meirion Thomas. In the 1965 Queen's Birthday Honours, he was appointed a Commander of the Order of the British Empire. He was conferred with an honorary Doctor of Science degree by Massey University in 1972.

== Publications ==
- Profitable Sheep Farming (reprinted 1996)
- Profitable Beef Production (1984)
- Grass Farming (1973 reprinted 1979)
