= Kenneth Jackson (sportsman) =

Scotland international rugby union player & cricketer (1913–1982)

Personal information
- Full name: Kenneth Leslie Tattersall Jackson
- Born: 17 November 1913; Shanghai, Jiangsu, Republic of China
- Died: 21 March 1982 (aged 68); Hinton St George, Somerset, England
- Batting: Right-handed
- Bowling: Right-arm fast-medium

Domestic team information
- Years: Team
- 1934–1935: Oxford University
- 1938–1946: Berkshire

Career statistics
Competition	First-class
Matches	9
Runs scored	181
Batting average	12.92
100s/50s	0/0
Top score	33
Balls bowled	1,852
Wickets	29
Bowling average	30.13
5 wickets in innings	1
10 wickets in match	0
Best bowling	5/66
Catches/stumpings	4/–
- Source: Cricinfo, 12 February 2019

Rugby union career
- Position: Fly Half
Amateur team(s)
Years	Team	Apps	(Points)
- Oxford University
Provincial / State sides
Years	Team	Apps	(Points)
1934	Scotland Probables		
International career
Years	Team	Apps	(Points)
1933-34	Scotland	4	(0)

Kenneth Leslie Tattersall Jackson (17 November 1913 – 21 March 1982) was a Scottish first-class cricketer and Scotland international rugby union player.

Jackson was born at Shanghai in November 1913. He was educated in England at Rugby School, before going up to Trinity College, Oxford.

== Cricket career ==
=== Amateur career ===
While studying at Oxford, he played first-class cricket for Oxford University in 1934–35, making nine appearances.

Jackson scored 181 runs in his nine matches, at an average of 12.92, with a high score of 33.

With his right-arm fast-medium bowling, he took 29 wickets at a bowling average of 30.13. He took one five wicket haul, with best figures of 5 for 66 against Worcestershire.

=== Provincial career ===
While teaching at Wellington College, Jackson also played minor counties cricket for Berkshire, making two appearances either side of the Second World War.

== Rugby Union career ==
=== Amateur career ===
Jackson played for Oxford University.

=== Provincial career ===
Jackson was named in the Scotland Probables side on 13 January 1934. Batting for selection, was his opponent on the Scotland Possibles side James Cotter from Hillhead HSFP.

The Aberdeen Press and Journal noted that day:

Cotter is a player of exceptional merit, he has, indeed, that quality all-roundness which seems to characterise all great players. A grand fullback, clever centre, he is also an accomplished stand-off half. Jackson will require to be his best to outshine Cotter.

=== International career ===
Jackson represented Scotland while a student, playing as a fly half in four Test matches in the 1933 and 1934 Home Nations Championship's. He scored a try against Wales (1933), a drop goal against Ireland (1933) - a total of 7 points under the rules at the time.

== Teaching career ==
After graduating from Oxford, Jackson became a schoolmaster at Wellington College, Berkshire.

== Military career ==
He served in the Second World War with the Duke of Wellington's Regiment, being conscripted in October 1940, with promotion to the war substantive rank of lieutenant coming in January 1941. Following the war, he gained the war substantive rank of captain, before relinquishing his commission in December 1946.

== Death ==
He died at Hinton St George in March 1982.
