= 1991 Italy rugby union tour of Namibia =

Summary
P	W	D	L
Total
5	3	0	2
Test match
2	0	0	2
Opponent
P	W	D	L
Namibia
2	0	0	2

The 1991 Italy rugby union tour of Namibia was a series of matches played between in June 1991 in Namibia by Italy national rugby union team to prepare the 1991 Rugby World Cup.

== Results ==
Scores and results list Italy's points tally first.

Opposing Team	For	Against	Date	Venue	Status
Namibia B	18	15	8 June 1991	Windhoek	Tour match
Welwitscha	67	6	11 June 1991	Walvis Bay	Tour match
Namibia	7	17	15 June 1991	Windhoek	Test match
North Namibia	48	6	18 June 1991	Tsumeb	Tour match
Namibia	19	33	22 June 1991	Windhoek	Test match

== Bibliography ==
- (in Italian) Valerio Vecchiarelli, Francesco Volpe, 2000, Italia in meta, GS editore, 2000.
- Vivian Jenkins, ed. (1989). Rothmans Rugby Yearbook 1989–90. Rothmans Publications Ltd. p. 65. ISBN 0-907574-05-X.
- (in Spanish) Memorias de la UAR 1989
