= Albert Craig (rhymester) =

Sporting writer (1849–1909)

Albert Craig

Albert Craig (2 September 1849 – 8 July 1909) was commonly known as The Surrey Poet, although he never used the term himself, instead signing his pieces as "A.C. Cricket Rhymester". He would attend cricket and football matches to write verses and short essays describing the players and events, then had them printed on broadsheets and sold to the crowd. His poetry was not renowned for any literary merit but he was a popular and well-known figure, thanks to his good nature and his ready wit.

== Early life ==
Craig was born in Meltham, Huddersfield, Yorkshire. When as a young man he found employment as a post office clerk in the Bradford area, he found that his topical verses went down well with his workmates. Encouraged by this, he obtained permission from Yorkshire to sell his verses at Park Avenue during a match against Gloucestershire. Going to the match, he wrote one piece on George Ulyett and another on Fred Grace. He sold a thousand copies in two hours, earning as much as in two months as a clerk. Before long he gave up the post office and moved to London to try to make his living from his verse.

== The rhymester ==
Basil Easterbrook wrote of him: "He knew his limitations and he was a good psychologist into the bargain as the following anecdote illustrates. He went down to Canterbury Week in the 1890s and as he walked round the ground selling his verses he said 'I know that any fool among you could write a better poem than this, but I defy anyone else, however intelligent, to sell it at 2d a copy', This was greeted with roars of laughter and the tuppences flowed in merrily."

Professor F. J. Cole, in a letter to The Daily Telegraph, described him thus: "His education must have been very indifferent, and to the end of his life the letter H always beat him. He had a great command of humour and invective, and his little serio-comic lectures were always skilfully adapted to the section of the crowd he happened to be addressing, He could silence the knocker, and the member of the crowd who attempted to score off him always had the laugh turned against himself."

As his nickname attests, he was particularly associated with Surrey and their home ground of The Oval, where he came to be known as the 'Captain of Spectators', though he visited many other grounds. At the first match of one season he ran to announce that Surrey had lost the toss with the rhyme "For though of football for five months I've sung, I'm mighty glad now that spring has sprung".

In July 1906 he wrote an 18 line verse to mark the young Jack Hobbs' innings of 162 not out against Worcestershire at The Oval. It began:

Joy reigns supreme amongst the Surrey throng,
Patrons break out in one triumphant song;
Young Hobbs we loved as hero of today,
Gaily he steers along his conquering way.

He would follow Surrey and the Australian and South African touring sides around the country, and sometimes went to Kent and Sussex home games.

Ronald Mason wrote of him: "He had no authority but popularity, no recommendation but gaiety, no talent but wit."

In Chapter X of his novel Mr Justice Raffles (1909), E.W. Hornung wrote about a University Match at Lord's: And in the expectant hush before the appearance of the fielding side, I still recall the Yorkshire accent of the Surrey Poet, hawking his latest lyric on some "Great Stand by Mr. Webbe and Mr. Stoddart," and incidentally assuring the crowd that Cambridge was going to win because everyone said Oxford would.

According to Easterbrook, in a 1908 FA Cup match between Chelsea and Northampton Town, the crowd became angry at a refereeing decision and at the end of the game attempted to invade the pitch. However Craig confronted them and shouted: "Boys, do nothing tonight that you will regret tomorrow. I have been your captain for twenty-six years, so take my advice and go home." The crowd complied, and Chelsea sent him an official letter of thanks. However Chelsea only first played Northampton in 1965, and the match to which Easterbrook refers was in fact a league match played on 29th April 1908 against Notts County, which Chelsea lost by 2-1.

== Death ==
He died in Clapham, South London from an abscess on the lung. During his final illness he received a letter sent from Marlborough House which read: "Dear Sir—The Prince of Wales much regrets to hear that you have been seriously indisposed. His Royal Highness desires me to express his earnest hope that you health may be restored and that your friends may soon be able to welcome you back to The Oval. Yours faithfully, Arthur Bigge."

Bobby Abel was his closest friend in cricket and on Craig's death he took the responsibility for arranging his funeral, which many well-known cricketers attended.

After his death, a book of his collected work was published:

- Craig, Albert; Abel, Robert (1910). Cricket and football : rhymes, sketches, anecdotes, etc. of Albert Craig, the "Surrey poet". Cricket & Sports. OCLC 906307444.

== See also ==
- Cricket poetry
