= Alan Key =

Alan Key may refer to:

- Alan Key (rugby union), an English rugby union player and British Army officer
- Allen key, a tool with a hexagonal cross-section used to drive bolts and screws

== See also ==
- Alan Kay (born 1940), American computer scientist
- Alan Lee Keyes (born 1950), an American conservative political activist, author and former ambassador
