= Lewis Booth =

Lewis Booth may refer to:

- Lewis Booth (rugby union) (1909–1942), English rugby union player
- Lewis Booth (businessman) (born 1948), British business executive
