= Maurice Turnbull =

English cricketer & rugby union player (1906-1944)

Personal information
- Full name: Maurice Joseph Lawson Turnbull
- Born: 16 March 1906; Cardiff, Wales
- Died: 5 August 1944 (aged 38); Montchamp, German-occupied France
- Batting: Right-handed
- Bowling: Right-arm offbreak

International information
- National side: England
- Test debut: 10 January 1930 v New Zealand
- Last Test: 27 June 1936 v India

Career statistics
Competition	Test	First-class
Matches	9	388
Runs scored	224	17,544
Batting average	20.36	29.78
100s/50s	0/1	29/82
Top score	61	233
Balls bowled	–	390
Wickets	–	4
Bowling average	–	88.75
5 wickets in innings	–	0
10 wickets in match	–	0
Best bowling	–	1/4
Catches/stumpings	1/–	280/–
- Source: CricInfo, 19 October 2019

Rugby union career
- Position: Scrum-half
Amateur team(s)
Years	Team	Apps	(Points)
- St. Peters RFC
–	Cardiff RFC		
–	London Welsh RFC		
–	Glamorgan County RFC		
–	Somerset		
International career
Years	Team	Apps	(Points)
1933	Wales	2	(0)
- Military career
- Allegiance: United Kingdom
- Branch: British Army
- Rank: Major
- Unit: Welsh Guards
- Conflicts: World War II; Normandy landings †

Maurice Joseph Lawson Turnbull (16 March 1906 – 5 August 1944) was a Welsh cricketer who played in nine Test matches for the England cricket team between 1930 and 1936.

A talented all round sportsman, Turnbull excelled in several sports. In cricket he captained the Cambridge University team in his final year of college and captained the Glamorgan County Cricket Club for ten seasons. In rugby union he represented Cardiff and London Welsh and gained two full international caps for Wales in 1933. Turnbull also represented Wales at field hockey and was squash champion for South Wales. He is the only person to have played cricket for England and rugby for Wales.

== Personal history ==
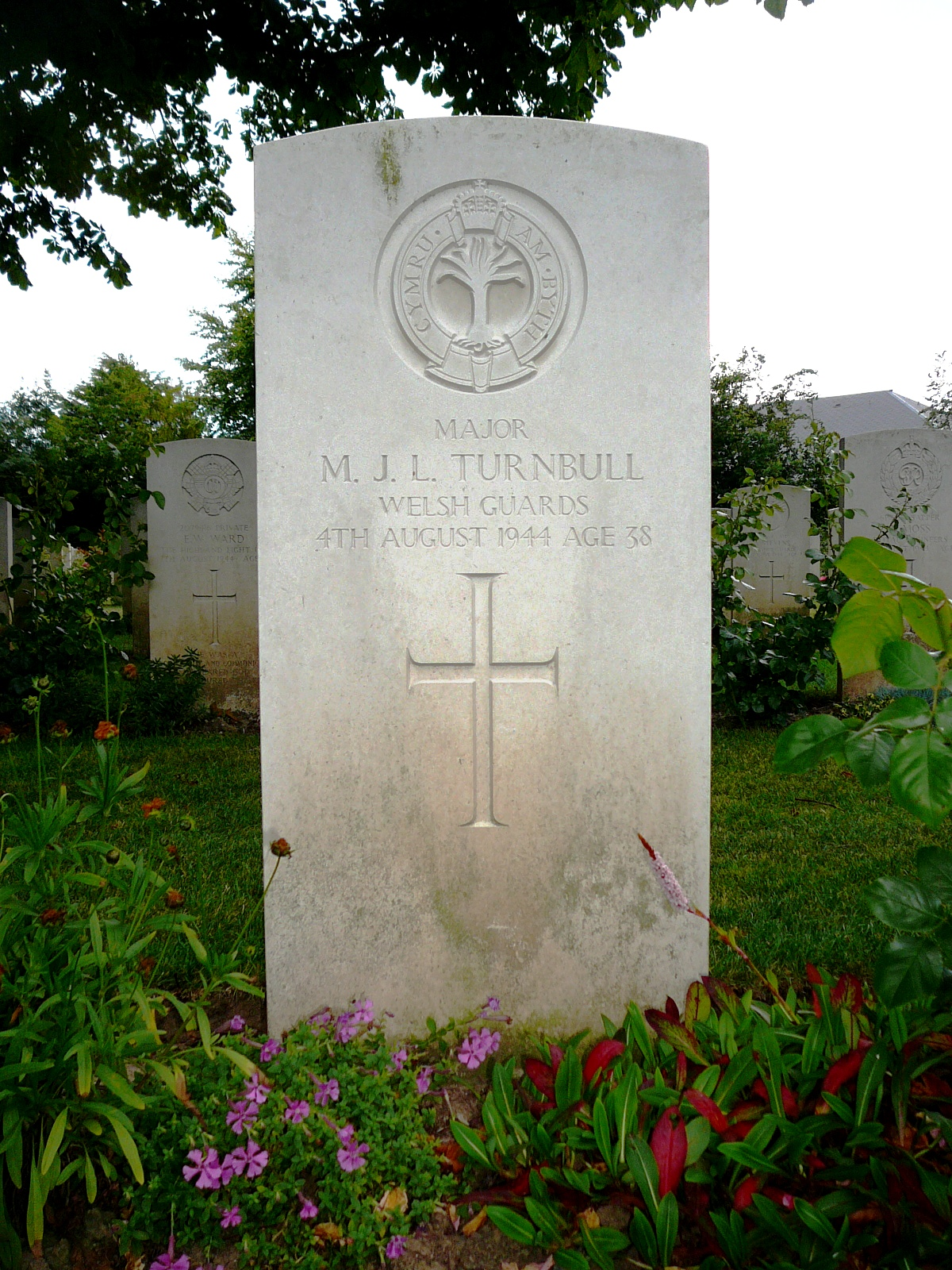
Headstone of Maurice Turnbull. Bayeux CWGC Cemetery.

Turnbull was born in Cardiff in 1906 into a large sporting family. His father, Philip, was a Welsh international hockey player, winning a bronze medal with the Welsh team (later credited as part of a single Great Britain team) at the 1908 Olympics, and six of his eight sons, including Maurice, played for Cardiff Rugby Club. Turnbull was educated at Downside School near Bath; and the school still has a bar named after him for the use of sixth formers. From Downside he went to Cambridge University and continued his connection with sport by winning sporting Blues in both cricket and hockey.

On 7 September 1939 he married Elizabeth Brooke, only daughter of William Brooke of Scunthorpe. They had three children: Sara, Simon and Georgina.

As a major in the First Battalion of the Welsh Guards he was killed instantly by a sniper's bullet during intense fighting for the French village of Montchamp after the Normandy landings in 1944. His body was recovered from the battlefield by one of his men, Sergeant Fred Llewellyn, and his personal possessions were sent home to his family.

== Cricket career ==
Christopher Martin-Jenkins wrote that to Turnbull batting was an adventure. He was a gifted right-hander who made runs when they were wanted and whose value could not always be assessed on figures. Initially as an on-side player, he developed all the recognised strokes and added some of his own, and he was also a fine short-leg fielder.

Always associated in the public minds with Glamorgan, he first appeared for them as a schoolboy in 1924. He captained Cambridge in 1929 and Glamorgan from 1930 until 1939. He passed 1000 runs in a season ten times and three times hit double-centuries, the highest being 233 against Worcestershire at Swansea in 1937, a season in which Glamorgan finished higher than ever before thanks to his bold leadership and devoted example. He toured Australia and New Zealand in 1929-30 and South Africa in 1930-31, and represented England against the West Indies and India at home.

Turnbull wrote two cricketing books with fellow Test player Maurice Allom, The Book of Two Maurices (1930) and The Two Maurices Again (1931). The books gave accounts of their cricket tours to New Zealand and South Africa respectively.

His leadership transformed Glamorgan. Writing in Wisden in 1978, Basil Easterbrook said:

Not the least of Turnbull's achievements was that he was the first man to justify Glamorgan's elevation to first-class status in 1921. By 1929 they had already had the wooden spoon three times under no fewer than seven leaders. When Turnbull took over [in 1930, as captain and club secretary] they were indeed a bedraggled flock without a shepherd. Turnbull linked Monmouthshire with Glamorgan, ran a Minor Counties side, improved the membership and by 1937 the improvement had advanced to a point where Glamorgan won 13 matches and finished seventh, in the top half of the Championship for the first time.

== Rugby career ==
Turnbull was an eager sportsman as a youth, and played rugby for Downside School. He matriculated to Cambridge, and at university joined not only the cricket team, but also Cambridge University Rugby Club. One of the earliest rugby clubs he represented was St. Peters in Cardiff. His elder brother, Bernard Turnbull had already represented Wales by this time, and had also played club rugby for St. Peters. During the 1931–32 season, Turnbull played his first senior game for Cardiff, mainly playing at scrum-half, and by 1932 he was representing rugby at county level, playing for Glamorgan.

Turnbull was first selected to play for Wales in the opening match of the 1933 Home Nations Championship, played away to England. Turnbull was one of seven new caps brought into the Welsh team, under the captaincy of Watcyn Thomas, and was paired at half-back with Cardiff and London Welsh regular Harry Bowcott. The game ended in a narrow 7–3 win for Wales, with Ronnie Boon scoring all the Welsh points which finally laid the 'Twickenham bogey', ten losses in ten visits, to rest.

The Welsh selectors responded by selecting all 15 players to play the second game of the tournament against Scotland; but several late withdrawals forced the selectors to make last minute changes. Turnbull himself was forced to withdraw because of injury, which saw Bowcott also stand down to allow the introduction of the Swansea half-back pairing of Morris and Evans to take their place. Wales were easily beaten. In the final game of the Championship, Turnbull was declared fit and he and Bowcott returned to the squad. The build-up to the game was overshadowed by poor player conduct on the boat to Belfast, and then captain Thomas reshuffled some of the player positions against the wishes of the Welsh Rugby Union, during the game. The Irish won 10-5, and the WRU reacted by discarding eleven of the team for the next season. Turnbull was one of the players who never played international rugby for Wales again.

== Bibliography ==
- Davies, D.E. (1975). Cardiff Rugby Club, History and Statistics 1876–1975. Risca: The Starling Press. ISBN 0-9504421-0-0.
