= Len Hill =

Welsh sportsman

Cricket information
- Batting: Right-handed
- Bowling: Right-arm-medium

Career statistics
Competition	First-class	List A
Matches	76	28
Runs scored	2,690	285
Batting average	24.45	14.25
100s/50s	0/14	0/0
Top score	96*	42
Balls bowled	52	–
Wickets	0	–
Bowling average	–	–
5 wickets in innings	–	–
10 wickets in match	–	–
Best bowling	–	–
Catches/stumpings	40/1	12/–
- Source: Cricinfo, 27 March 2019

Len Hill
Personal information
- Full name: Lenard Winston Hill
- Date of birth: 14 April 1941
- Place of birth: Caerleon, Wales
- Date of death: 10 April 2007 (aged 65)
- Height: 5 ft 7 in (1.70 m)
- Position: Wing half

Youth career
- 1958–62: Lovells Athletic

Senior career*
Years	Team	Apps	(Gls)
1962–1970	Newport County	269	(52)
1970–1971	Swansea	12	(1)
1971–74	Newport County	97	(13)
- * Club domestic league appearances and goals

Lenard Winston Hill (14 April 1941 – 12 April 2007) was a Welsh sportsman, who played first-class cricket for Glamorgan, league football for Swansea Town and Newport County and was also a talented tennis player. It was mentioned that he only went to play football professionally so he could spend more time practising in the nets for cricket. In later life Len was a keen golfer with a handicap of 3 and represented Wales Seniors.

== Early sporting career ==
Hill was born in Caerleon and played for Lovell's Athletic before joining Newport County in 1962. He remained with Newport until 1973, later playing briefly for Swansea City.

== Later career ==
Hill joined Glamorgan County Cricket Club in 1964, but his football career took precedence, preventing him from playing a full county cricket season until the mid-1970s. His first class debut came on 18 July 1964 against Lancashire. He scored just one run on his debut, falling lbw to Brian Statham.

He later became a regular right-hand batsman in the Glamorgan first XI, and was awarded a county cap in 1974. He made 76 first-class appearances for Glamorgan and scored 2,690 runs (including 14 fifties), with a top score of 96 not out against Gloucestershire in 1974. In the same year, he scored 90 not out against Hampshire in one of the year's most notable Glamorgan victories. He played his last game for Glamorgan in 1976. He helped Glamorgan to victory beating Pakistan where he got Imran Khan and some other notable players out.

A brief spell as professional at Ammanford Cricket Club completed his career.

== Recognition of qualities ==
In 1975, he was featured in an article in Wisden by Basil Easterbrook entitled "The Willing Workhorses of First Class Cricket".

A popular player, in retirement he kept in touch with his ex-colleagues through the Glamorgan Ex-Players' Association.

== Death ==
Hill died in April 2007, aged 65.
