= Robert Thornhill =

English cricketer

Personal information
- Full name: Robert Victor Thornhill
- Born: 24 July 1902; England
- Died: 28 July 1963 (aged 61); Merton, Surrey, England
- Batting: Right-handed

Career statistics
Competition	First-class
Matches	1
Runs scored	64
Batting average	32.00
100s/50s	–/1
Top score	52
Catches/stumpings	–/–
- Source: Cricinfo, 25 July 2019

Robert Victor Thornhill (24 July 1902 – 28 July 1963) was an English first-class cricketer.

Thornhill, who was born at Merton in July 1902, made a single appearance in first-class cricket for H. D. G. Leveson-Gower's XI against Oxford University at Reigate in 1934. Batting twice in the match, he was dismissed for 52 runs in the HDG Leveson-Gower's XI first-innings by Kenneth Jackson, while in their second-innings he was dismissed for 12 runs by Sandy Singleton. He was employed as a bank clerk. Thornhill died in July 1963 at Merton.
