= Bryn Evans (rugby union, born 1902) =

Wales international rugby union footballer

- Born: Daniel Brinley Evans; 16 January 1902 Penclawdd, Wales
- Died: 29 April 1970 (aged 68) Penclawdd, Wales

Rugby union career
- Position: Scrum half
Amateur team(s)
Years	Team	Apps	(Points)
- Penclawdd RFC
–	Swansea RFC		
International career
Years	Team	Apps	(Points)
1933	Wales	1	(0)

Daniel Brinley 'Bryn' Evans (16 January 1902 – 29 April 1970) was a Welsh international rugby union scrum-half who played for Wales and Swansea.

== Rugby career ==
Evans originally played rugby for lower-tier club Penclawdd, whose senior team he captained during the 1929/30 season, before moving to first class side Swansea.

Evans played only one game for Wales, against Scotland as part of the 1933 Home Nations Championship. Wales had just come away from an historic victory over England in the opening game of the competition, when the team won at Twickenham for the first time. Welsh hopes were high for the second game that was against Scotland at Swansea's home ground St Helens. The selectors wanted to stick with the same team that had beaten the English, but Maurice Turnbull had reported in injured. The selectors therefore decided to drop his partner, the reliable Harry Bowcott to allow for the Swansea partnership of Evans and Ron Morris to take their place. Although on home soil and against an inexperienced Scottish team, Wales lost 11–3, and Evans was dropped for the next match and never represented his country again.

=== International matches played ===
Wales

- Scotland 1933

== Biography ==
- Godwin, Terry (1984). The International Rugby Championship 1883-1983. London: Willows Books. ISBN 0-00-218060-X.
- Smith, David; Williams, Gareth (1980). Fields of Praise: The Official History of The Welsh Rugby Union. Cardiff: University of Wales Press. ISBN 0-7083-0766-3.
