= Raymond Bark-Jones =

Wales international rugby union footballer

- Born: Raymond Bark-Jones; 29 August 1911 Blundellsands, Liverpool, England
- Died: 2 February 1995 (aged 83) Sefton, England
- School: Uppingham School

Rugby union career
- Position: Lock
Amateur team(s)
Years	Team	Apps	(Points)
- Cambridge University R.U.F.C.
–	Waterloo R.F.C.		
International career
Years	Team	Apps	(Points)
1933	Wales	2	(0)

Raymond Bark-Jones (29 August 1911 – 2 February 1995) was an English rugby union lock who played international rugby for Wales. He played his club rugby for Waterloo R.F.C. and Cambridge University.

== Rugby career ==
Bark-Jones was educated at Uppingham School, Rutland and from there was accepted into Cambridge University. While at Cambridge he played in the 1932 December Varsity match, along with future Wales international Vivian Jenkins. Bark-Jones played impressively and was tipped as a future Welsh cap by the Western Mail and just a few weeks later, in the Welsh trials, was chosen to represent Wales.

Bark-Jones' first international game was a Welsh victory over his birth country, England. Wales had failed to win at Twickenham in the first nine attempts, and the Welsh failure at the ground was known as the 'Twickenham bogey'. Bark-Jones' line-out play was critical to the Welsh victory. The game ended 7–3, with all the Welsh points scored by Ronnie Boon. Bark-Jones played one more international game in the next match of the Home Nations Championship against Scotland at St Helens.

Bark-Jones was injured at the age of 22 and was forced to retire from rugby. His son Richard Bark Jones continued the rugby tradition at Uppingham, Cambridge and Lancashire.

His family carry on the Rugby tradition with his great-grandsons Sam Halliwell playing 1st team rugby at Shrewsbury and William Halliwell playing 15 A's Rugby. A quote from his son Richard Bark- Jones, "he was one of the best rugby players and a great father". A quote from his son Neville Bark-Jones, "he was gentle off the pitch yet fearful on".

== International matches played ==
Wales

- England 1933
- Scotland 1933

== Bibliography ==
- Godwin, Terry (1984). The International Rugby Championship 1883-1983. London: Willows Books. ISBN 0-00-218060-X.
- Griffiths, Terry (1987). The Phoenix Book of International Rugby Records. London: Phoenix House. ISBN 0-460-07003-7.
- Smith, David; Williams, Gareth (1980). Fields of Praise: The Official History of The Welsh Rugby Union. Cardiff: University of Wales Press. ISBN 0-7083-0766-3.
