= Cowey =

Cowey is a surname. Notable people with the surname include:

- Alan Cowey (1935–2012), British scientist and academic
- Bernard Cowey (1911–1997), English rugby union footballer
- Chris Cowey (born c.1961), English television producer
- Edward Cowey (1839–1903), British trade unionist
