= Bryn Evans (rugby union, born 1906) =

Wales international rugby union player

- Full name: Brinley Evans
- Born: 21 July 1906 Felinfoel, Wales
- Died: 6 October 1978 (aged 72) Felinfoel, Wales

Rugby union career
- Position: Hooker
International career
Years	Team	Apps	(Points)
1933–37	Wales	6	(0)

Brinley Evans (21 July 1906 – 6 October 1978) was a Welsh international rugby union player.

Evans was a native of Felinfoel and played for the Llanelly RFC.

A hooker, Evans was capped six times for Wales, debuting against England in 1933. He is not to be confused with Swansea halfback Bryn Evans, with whom he shared one of his Wales appearances. His last international match was the opening fixture of the 1937 Home Nations, which Wales lost to England.

== See also ==
- List of Wales national rugby union players
