= Billy Moore (rugby, born 1910) =

Welsh rugby footballer

- Born: William John Moore; 17 February 1910 Garw Valley, Wales
- Died: 31 March 1976 (aged 66) Oldham, England
- Occupation: quarryman

Rugby union career
- Position: Lock
Amateur team(s)
Years	Team	Apps	(Points)
- Bridgend RFC
–	Glamorgan County RFC		
International career
Years	Team	Apps	(Points)
1933	Wales	1	(0)
- Rugby league career

Playing information
- Position: Forward
Club
Years	Team	Pld	T	G	FG	P
1934–37	Rochdale Hornets
1937–47	Oldham
	Total	0	0	0	0	0

Billy Moore (17 February 1910 – 31 March 1976) was a Welsh international dual-code rugby player who played rugby union for Bridgend RFC and rugby league for Rochdale Hornets. He was capped only once for Wales under the union code, for a match in the 1933 Home Nations Championship.

== Playing career ==
Moore switched codes to rugby league in January 1934, transferring from Bridgend RFC to English club Rochdale Hornets. In November 1937, he was transferred to Oldham, where he went on to make over 150 appearances.

== International matches played ==
Wales

- Ireland 1933

== Bibliography ==
- Billot, John (1974). Springboks in Wales. Ferndale: Ron Jones Publications.
- Goodwin, Terry (1984). The International Rugby Championship 1883-1983. London: Willows Books. ISBN 0-00-218060-X.
- Smith, David; Williams, Gareth (1980). Fields of Praise: The Official History of The Welsh Rugby Union. Cardiff: University of Wales Press. ISBN 0-7083-0766-3.
