= Henry O'Neill (rugby union) =

Irish rugby player (1907–1994)

- Full name: Henry O'Hara O'Neill
- Born: 1 July 1907 Portstewart, Ireland
- Died: 1 October 1994 (aged 87)

Rugby union career
- Position: Prop
International career
Years	Team	Apps	(Points)
1930–33	Ireland	6	(0)
1930	British Lions	5	(0)

Henry O'Hara O'Neill (1 July 1907 – 1 October 1994) was an Irish international rugby union player. Born in Portstewart, County Londonderry, O'Neill was educated at Coleraine Academical Institution, where he won a Ulster Schools' Cup medal, University College Cork and Queen's University Belfast, prior to a career as a civil servant.

O'Neill, a loosehead prop, gained his Ireland call up via Queen's University RFC. He featured in all three of Ireland's 1930 Five Nations matches. He then won selection on the 1930 British Lions & Irish tour to New Zealand and Australia, the first to feature recognised props, and played in each of the five international fixtures. After a three-year absence, O'Neill was recalled by Ireland for their 1933 Home Nations campaign, gaining a further three caps.

O'Neill is the only prop to have played for Queen's RFC and the Lions.

== See also ==
- List of Ireland national rugby union players
- List of British & Irish Lions players
