= Bernard Cowey =

Wales international rugby union player

- Born: Bernard Turing Vionnee Cowey; 20 November 1911 Tidworth, England
- Died: 20 August 1997 (aged 85) Nottingham, England
- School: Wellington College, Berkshire
- Occupation: soldier

Rugby union career
- Position: Wing
Amateur team(s)
Years	Team	Apps	(Points)
- Army XV
- London Welsh RFC
1933-1936	Newport RFC		
- Sussex
1933-1934	Barbarian F.C.		
International career
Years	Team	Apps	(Points)
1934-1935	Wales	4	(9)

Brigadier Bernard Turing Vionnée 'Bun' Cowey DSO, OBE (20 November 1911 – 20 August 1997) was an English rugby union wing who played club rugby for Newport and international rugby for Wales. Unlike most rugby internationals, Cowey was most associated with the Army Rugby Union rather than club or county rugby. In later life he became Chairman of the Army Rugby Union.

== Rugby career ==
Cowey was born in Tidworth, Wiltshire in 1911 but when he joined the British Armed Forces, he was posted in the Welch Regiment, traditionally the reserve of Welsh nationals. He played rugby while on duty, for his regiment and later played for the Army's own rugby team. Outside the army, Cowey played for two first class rugby union clubs: London Welsh and Newport. It was while playing with Newport that he was selected to play for Wales, after his service with the Welch Regiment made him eligible to represent his adoptive country.

Cowey's first cap was in the 1934 Home Nations Championship, where he was one of 13 new caps to be tested by Wales, in a match at the Cardiff Arms Park against England. Wales's inexperience showed and they lost 9–0. Although five of the players from that match were never selected for Wales again, Cowey wasn't amongst them and returned for the next game against Scotland. The Scottish game was far more successful for Wales, with a strong performance from Cliff Jones. Cowey repaid the selectors' trust in him with two tries in the Scotland match, and again in the last game of the tournament when he scored another against Ireland. Cowey's final game for Wales was during the 1935 Championship when he again faced England. Under the captaincy of Wilf Wooller, Wales drew the match after a late penalty goal from Boughton.

=== International matches played ===
Wales

- England 1934, 1935
- Ireland 1934
- Scotland 1934

== Bibliography ==
- Smith, David; Williams, Gareth (1980). Fields of Praise: The Official History of The Welsh Rugby Union. Cardiff: University of Wales Press. ISBN 0-7083-0766-3.
