= Howard Nicholls =

Wales international rugby union footballer

- Born: Howard Charles Warrender Nicholls; 2 June 1931 Maesteg, Wales
- Died: 2 March 2011 (aged 79) Porthcawl, Wales
- School: Maesteg Grammar School
- Occupation(s): banker butcher

Rugby union career
- Position: Wing
Amateur team(s)
| Years | Team | Apps | (Points) |
- Maesteg Celtic RFC
| – | Maesteg RFC | | |
| – | Bridgend RFC | | |
| – | Cardiff RFC | | |
International career
| Years | Team | Apps | (Points) |
| 1958 | Wales | 1 | (0) |

Howard Charles Warrender Nicholls (2 June 1931 – 2 March 2011) was a Welsh rugby union player who at club level represented Maesteg, Bridgend and Cardiff. He gained just a single cap for Wales, awarded for facing Ireland in the 1958 Five Nations Championship.

== Personal history ==
Nicholls was born in Maesteg in 1931, and attended Maesteg Grammar, who he represented on the rugby field. He later attended Hereford Cathedral School, and played in the same school cricket team as future England international Peter Richardson. After leaving school, Nicholls returned to Wales, to begin a career with Lloyd's Bank. He later left banking to take over the family butchers from his father, Percy. He moved to Porthcawl in 1963 after marrying Jill Jones, whose father was ex-Wales international rugby player Arthur Hugh Jones. The couple had four children.

A keen amateur photographer and birdwatcher, Nicholls was often published in various birding magazines. He died at Danygraig Care Home in Porthcawl in 2011, having survived his wife.

== Rugby career ==
Nicholls played rugby for both Maesteg Grammar and Hereford Cathedral School and continued to play rugby on his return to Wales, firstly for Maesteg Celtic before switching to Maesteg. Nicholls also turned out for Bridgend before, in the 1952-53 season, switching to first-class team Cardiff. Nicholls spent seven seasons with Cardiff, playing in 150 senior games. In 1958 he was selected for his one and only Wales cap, in that year's Five Nations Championship encounter with Ireland.

== Bibliography ==
- Davies, D.E. (1975). Cardiff Rugby Club, History and Statistics 1876-1975. Risca: The Starling Press. ISBN 0-9504421-0-0.
- Jenkins, John M.; et al. (1991). Who's Who of Welsh International Rugby Players. Wrexham: Bridge Books. ISBN 1-872424-10-4.
