= Robert Barnes (sportsman) =

Ireland international rugby union player and cricketer

Cricket information
- Batting: Left-handed
- Bowling: Slow left-arm orthodox

International information
- National side: Ireland

Career statistics
Competition	First-class
Matches	8
Runs scored	199
Batting average	14.21
100s/50s	0/0
Top score	48
Balls bowled	300
Wickets	9
Bowling average	11.00
5 wickets in innings	0
10 wickets in match	0
Best bowling	4/18
Catches/stumpings	7/0
- Source: CricketArchive, 16 August 2022

Robert James Barnes (25 March 1911 – 12 March 1987) was an Irish cricketer and Rugby Union player.

He made his debut for Ireland against the MCC in August 1928 and went on to represent his country on 14 occasions, his last coming in July 1949 against Yorkshire. Eight of those games had first-class status.

He played just once for the Ireland national rugby union team, against Wales in the 1933 Home Nations Championship, scoring one try.

== See also ==
- List of Irish cricket and rugby union players
