= Ronnie Morris (rugby union) =

Wales international rugby union footballer

Ronald Rhys Morris (13 June 1913 – February 1983) was a Welsh rugby player. He was a member of the Bristol Rugby Football Club from 1933 to 1937 and played for Swansea and Wales.

Morris was born in Carmarthen. He played outside-half and was capped twice, both times against Scotland, making his debut in the 1933 Home Nations Championship loss to the Scots and concluding his international career with a second loss in the corresponding fixture of the 1937 Home Nations Championship. He died in Westbury-on-Trym, England.
