= Art Jones =

Art Jones may refer to:

- Art Jones (baseball) (1906–1980), pitcher in Major League Baseball
- Art Jones (American football) (1919–1995), American football defensive back
- Art Jones (ice hockey) (1935–2021), Canadian ice hockey centre
- Arthur J. Jones (born 1948), American Neo-Nazi, Holocaust denier and politician

== See also ==
- Arthur Jones (disambiguation)
