= Jim Thom =

- Full name: James Robert Thom
- Born: 22 November 1910 Kirkcaldy, Scotland
- Died: 13 December 1981 (aged 71) Morningside, Scotland

Rugby union career
- Position: Prop
International career
Years	Team	Apps	(Points)
1933	Scotland	3	(0)

James Robert Thom (22 November 1910 — 13 December 1981) was a Scottish international rugby union player.

Thom was born in Kirkcaldy and educated at George Watson's College in Edinburgh.

A prop, Thom was capped three times for Scotland in the 1933 Home Nations.

Thom held a forestry degree from the University of Edinburgh. He worked as a conservator and held high ranking positions with the Forestry Commission. His son, J. Stuart Thom, was the Conservative candidate for Roxburgh, Selkirk and Peebles in the 1974 general election (February), losing to David Steel.

== See also ==
- List of Scotland national rugby union players
