= Chick Jones =

Welsh rugby union player (1906–1987)

- Full name: Graham Glyn Jones
- Born: 24 November 1906 Clydach, Swansea, Wales
- Died: 23 October 1987 (aged 80) Morriston, Swansea, Wales
- School: Llandovery College

Rugby union career
- Position: Centre
International career
Years	Team	Apps	(Points)
1930–33	Wales	2	(7)

Graham Glyn "Chick" Jones (24 November 1906 – 23 October 1987) was a Welsh international rugby union player.

Jones was a native of Swansea and attended Llandovery College.

A centre, Jones was captain of Cardiff, from where he gained two Wales caps. He debuted against Scotland at Murrayfield during the 1930 Five Nations and contributed seven points, through a try and penalty goal, in a narrow loss. His other cap was against Ireland in a 1933 Home Nations match at Ravenhill. He continued his career with Llanelli in 1934.

Jones was the brother-in-law of twice capped Wales winger Arthur Jones.

== See also ==
- List of Wales national rugby union players
