= Anthony Roncoroni =

England international rugby union player

Anthony Roncoroni MC
- Full name: Anthony Dominic Sebastian Roncoroni
- Born: 16 March 1909 Hendon, London, England
- Died: 20 July 1953 (aged 44) Middleton-on-Sea, Sussex, England
- School: Rossall School

Rugby union career
- Position: Forward
International career
Years	Team	Apps	(Points)
1933	England	3	(0)

Major Anthony Dominic Sebastian Roncoroni (16 March 1909 – 20 July 1953) was a British Army officer and England international rugby union player of the 1930s.

Roncoroni, one of four brothers, was born in London and educated at Rossall School in Lancashire.

A forward, Roncoroni played for West Herts, Richmond, East Midlands and was capped three times for England in the 1933 Home Nations Championship. His rugby career was ended by the war.

Roncoroni served as a Royal Artillery with the 7th Medium Regiment during World War II. He was held as a German prisoner of war at a camp in Italy, from which he successfully escaped, trekking over 400 miles to the safety of the British lines. In 1945, Roncoroni was awarded a Military Cross for his wartime leadership and service.

== See also ==
- List of England national rugby union players
