= Gwyn Bayliss =

- Born: 7 May 1907 Brynmawr, Wales
- Died: 10 March 1976 (aged 68) Blaina, Wales

Rugby union career
- Position: Fullback
International career
Years	Team	Apps	(Points)
1933	Wales	1	(0)

Gwyn Bayliss (7 May 1907 — 10 March 1976) was a Welsh international rugby union player.

Raised in Brynmawr, Bayliss was capped once for Wales (via Pontypool). He gained his cap as a fullback against Wales at Swansea in 1933 and was a reserve on a further 14 occasions. His career coincided with that of regularly capped Wales fullbacks Jack Bassett and Vivian Jenkins, thus limiting his opportunities. Ending up in the Midlands, Bayliss captained Wolverhampton and was a North Midlands representative player.

Bayliss became a well known sports journalist in the Midlands. He wrote at the Wolverhampton newspaper Express & Star for 27 years and was a sporting broadcaster on BBC radio.

== See also ==
- List of Wales national rugby union players
