= Arthur L. Jones =

American politician

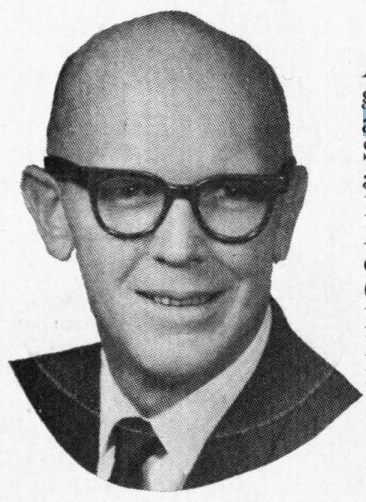

Member of the South Dakota House of Representatives for the 28th district
- In office 1967–1970

Personal details
- Born: August 23, 1924
- Died: December 16, 2003 (aged 79)
- Party: Republican
- Profession: investments

Arthur L. Jones (August 23, 1924 – December 16, 2003) was an American politician in the state of South Dakota. He was a member of the South Dakota House of Representatives. He was an alumnus of South Dakota School of Mines and Technology and was a veteran of World War II. He was an investment broker.
