= 1935–36 Scottish Districts season =

Rugby union competition

- Countries: Scotland
- Date: 1935–36
- Matches played: 1

The 1935–36 Scottish Districts season is a record of all the rugby union matches for Scotland's district teams.

== History ==
Glasgow District beat Edinburgh District in the Inter-City match.

The South were due to meet the All Blacks on October 18 in Hawick.

== Results ==
Date	Try	Conversion	Penalty	Dropped goal	Goal from mark	Notes
1905–1947	3 points	2 points	3 points	4 points	3 points	

=== Inter-City ===
7 December 1935

Glasgow District	29 – 0	Edinburgh District
	Report

Old Anniesland
Referee: Willie Burnet (Hawick)

Glasgow District:
Edinburgh District:

=== Other Scottish matches ===
None.

=== Trial matches ===
11 January 1936

Scotland Probables	22 – 12	Scotland Possibles
	Report; Report

Murrayfield Stadium

Scotland Probables:
Scottish Possibles:

=== English matches ===
No other District matches played.

=== International matches ===
No touring matches this season.
