= Robin Pratt =

Rugby union player from Northern Ireland

- Full name: Robert Henry Pratt
- Born: 24 December 1911 Enniskillen, Ireland
- Died: 4 August 1997 (aged 85)
- School: Portora Royal School
- University: Trinity College, Dublin

Rugby union career
- Position: Fullback
International career
Years	Team	Apps	(Points)
1933–34	Ireland	5	(0)

Robert Henry Pratt (24 December 1911 — 4 August 1997) was an Irish international rugby union player.

The son of an archdeacon, Pratt was raised in Enniskillen and attended Portora Royal School, before studying for his medical degree at Trinity College, Dublin. He was a member of the Dublin University Football Club.

Pratt, an Ulster player, gained three Ireland caps across the 1933 and 1934 Home Nations Championships.

After qualifying as a doctor, Pratt spent a period of time in the Royal Air Force.

== See also ==
- List of Ireland national rugby union players
