= Arthur E. Jones =

American architect

- Born: Arthur Evan Jones
- Education: Rice University
- Occupation: Architect

Arthur Evan Jones is an American architect based in Houston, Texas and a 1947 graduate of Rice University. His work with firms he partnered with in Houston include buildings and landmarks such as the Astrodome, Foley's, the Allen Centers, and Greenway Plaza, and buildings on the grounds of educational institutions such as the Kinkaid School, the University of Houston, and Rice University.

== Career ==
Jones joined the Houston-based firm headed by Hermon F. Lloyd and William B. Morgan in 1947 and was named a partner in 1961. The firm was renamed Lloyd Jones and Associates in 1974, then Lloyd, Jones and Brewer in 1976, reflecting a new partner, Benjamin E. Brewer, Jr. Brewer left in 1984 and Bob G. Fillpot joined the firm, which became Jones and Fillpot after Lloyd's death in 1989.
