= Charles Webb (rugby union) =

England international rugby union player

- Full name: Charles Samuel Henry Webb
- Born: 4 November 1902 Plymouth, England
- Died: 28 October 1961 (aged 58) Plymouth, England

Rugby union career
- Position: Lock
International career
Years	Team	Apps	(Points)
1932–36	England	12	(0)

Charles Samuel Henry Webb (4 November 1902 – 28 October 1961) was an English international rugby union player.

A Royal Marine from Plymouth, Devon, Webb was a Devonport Services and Navy rugby player, capped 12 times for England from 1932 to 1936, as a specialist second-row forward.

Webb captained Cornwall in 1934-35 and also represented Devon.

In 1937, Webb's England career effectively ended when he was posted to New Zealand.

== See also ==
- List of England national rugby union players
