= Edgar Jones (rugby) =

Wales international rugby union & league footballer

Personal information
- Full name: Edgar Lewis Jones
- Born: 4 May 1910 Sketty, Swansea, Wales
- Died: 11 February 1986 (aged 75) West Cross, Swansea, Wales

Playing information

Rugby union
- Position: Prop
Club
Years	Team	Pld	T	G	FG	P
	Gowerton RFC
≤1930–35	Llanelli RFC
	Total	0	0	0	0	0
Representative
Years	Team	Pld	T	G	FG	P
1930–35	Wales	5	0	0	0	0
	Barbarians

Rugby league
Club
Years	Team	Pld	T	G	FG	P
1935–≥35	Leeds
- Source: scrum.com

Edgar Lewis Jones (4 May 1910 – 11 February 1986) was a Welsh rugby union, and professional rugby league footballer who played in the 1920s and 1930s. He played representative level rugby union (RU) for Wales, at invitational level for Barbarian F.C., and at club level for Gowerton RFC and Llanelli RFC, as a prop, and club level rugby league (RL) for Leeds.

== Background ==
Jones was born in Sketty, Swansea, Wales, and he died aged 75 in West Cross, Swansea, Wales.

== International honours ==
Edgar Jones won caps for Wales (RU) while at Llanelli RFC in 1930 against France, in 1933 against England, Scotland, and Ireland, and in 1935 against England.
