= Bertrand Turnbull =

Welsh field hockey player

Personal information
- Born: 19 April 1887 Cardiff, Wales
- Died: 17 November 1943 (aged 57) Canton, Wales

Sport
- Sport: Field hockey
- Position: Goalkeeper
Senior career
Years	Team	Caps	Goals
1906–1908	Cardiff	-	-
–	Penarth	-	-
National team
Years	Team	Caps	Goals
1908–1914	Wales	19	-
Medal record
Representing Great BritainWales
Olympic Games
Bronze medal – third place	1908 London	Team

Welsh Hockey Team vs Scotland, 1911. (B Turnbull Bottom Row, 5th to the left)

Bertrand Turnbull (19 April 1887 – 17 November 1943) was a field hockey player from Wales, who competed in the 1908 Summer Olympics and won a bronze medal. He also played first-class cricket for Gloucestershire in one match.

== Biography ==
Turnbull was educated at Downside College in Bath and played club hockey for Cardiff Hockey Club from 1906. He would later play for Penarth and would captain Wales in 1914.

With only six teams participating in the field hockey tournament at the 1908 Olympic Games in London, he represented Wales under the Great British flag, where the team were awarded a bronze medal despite Wales only playing in and losing one match. He played as a goalkeeper for Wales and both he and his cousin Philip Turnbull were in the team.

His only taste of first-class cricket came in 1911 when he appeared as a wicketkeeper in a match for Gloucestershire against Cambridge University at Fenner's Cricket Ground, Cambridge. In a low-scoring match, he top-scored with an unbeaten 28 in Gloucestershire's first innings, but was out for seven in the second innings; he made one stumping. He also played Minor Counties cricket for Glamorgan.

He died in Canton, Cardiff, on 17 November 1943.
