= Gordon Gregory =

England international rugby union player

- Full name: Gordon George Gregory
- Born: 8 December 1907 Taunton, England
- Died: 4 December 1963 (aged 55) Newton Abbot, England
- Occupation: Farmer

Rugby union career
- Position: Front-row
International career
Years	Team	Apps	(Points)
1931–34	England	13	(4)

Gordon George Gregory (8 December 1907 – 4 December 1963) was an English international rugby union player.

Gregory attended Huish's Grammar School in his native Taunton and Reading University.

A front-row forward, Gregory played primarily as a hooker and was capped 13 times for England from 1931 to 1934, winning a Home Nations triple crown his final year. His England career also included a match against the Springboks at Twickenham. He played club rugby for Bath, Blackheath, Bristol and Taunton.

Gregory served as an officer in the Hampshire Regiment during World War II and spent his post-war years farming, near Bridgwater, Somerset, and later Totnes, Devon.

== See also ==
- List of England national rugby union players
