= Tom Brown (rugby union, born 1907) =

English rugby union player

- Full name: Thomas William Brown
- Born: 14 June 1907 Bristol, England
- Died: 14 May 1961 (aged 53) Bristol, England
- School: Colston's School
- University: Bristol University

Rugby union career
- Position: Fullback
International career
Years	Team	Apps	(Points)
1928–33	England	9	(0)

Thomas William Brown (14 June 1907 – 14 May 1961) was an English international rugby union player.

Born in Bristol, Brown was educated at Colston's School and Bristol University.

Brown, a fullback, played his club rugby for Bristol and regularly represented Gloucestershire, with which he won a county championship. He succeeded Kenneth Sellar as England fullback for their final 1928 Five Nations match, as they reclaimed the Calcutta Cup off Scotland, then in 1929 played the entire Five Nations campaign. His career was interrupted when a head cut he received playing for Major Stanley's XV in 1930 turned septic, leaving him critically ill in hospital. He didn't return to the England side until 1932 and gained the last of his nine caps the following year.

In 1933, Brown was given a lifetime ban from rugby union for associating with rugby league. He had not played rugby league, merely visited the grounds of Broughton Rangers in Manchester, having been approached to sign.

Brown ran a garage in Pilning and was licensee of the White Hart, Olveston.

== See also ==
- List of England national rugby union players
