= James Ritchie (rugby union) =

Scotland international rugby union player (1907–1942)

- Born: James McPhail Ritchie; 10 July 1907 Edinburgh, Scotland
- Died: 6 July 1942 (aged 34) Rawalpindi, Pakistan

Rugby union career
- Position: No. 8 / Hooker
Amateur team(s)
Years	Team	Apps	(Points)
- Watsonians
Provincial / State sides
Years	Team	Apps	(Points)
1931-33	Edinburgh District		
1932	Scotland Possibles		
International career
Years	Team	Apps	(Points)
1933-4	Scotland	6	(0)

James McPhail Ritchie (10 July 1907 – 6 July 1942) was a Scotland international rugby union player. He later joined the Indian Army and died in World War II at Rawalpindi in British India (now Pakistan) of enteric fever.

== Rugby Union career ==
=== Amateur career ===
He also played for Watsonians RFC.

=== Provincial career ===
He played for Edinburgh District. He played in the 1931-32 season intercity against Glasgow District with Edinburgh winning 11 pts to 6 pts. He played in the 1932-33 season intercity against Glasgow District with Edinburgh winning 15 pts to 3 pts. He played in the 1933-34 season Inter-City match against Glasgow District with Edinburgh winning 17 pts to 8 pts.

He played for Scotland Possibles against Scotland Probables in the trial match of 17 December 1932.

=== International career ===
He was capped six times for Scotland between 1933 and 1934.

== Military career ==
He joined the 14th Battalion of the 1st Punjab Regiment and became Second Lieutenant.

He died at the British Military Hospital at Rawalpindi on 6 July 1942.

== Business career ==
He was an insurance manager. He worked at Messrs. Bird & Co.

== Family ==
He was the son of John Ritchie and Lizzie McPhail. He married Evelyn Robertson Carr at Rosehall Church, Dalkeith Road, Edinburgh on 5 March 1935.

== See also ==
- List of Scottish rugby union players killed in World War II

== Sources ==
- Bath, Richard (ed.) The Scotland Rugby Miscellany (Vision Sports Publishing Ltd, 2007 ISBN 1-905326-24-6)
- Massie, Allan A Portrait of Scottish Rugby (Polygon, Edinburgh; ISBN 0-904919-84-6)
