= Billy Ross =

Rugby union player from Northern Ireland

- Full name: William McClintock Ross
- Born: 24 July 1909 Belfast, Ireland
- Died: 6 January 1969 (aged 59) Millom, England

Rugby union career
- Position: Wing-forward
International career
Years	Team	Apps	(Points)
1932–35	Ireland	9	(6)

William McClintock Ross (24 July 1909 — 6 January 1969) was an Irish international rugby union player.

Born in Belfast, Ross was a wing-forward and played rugby for Queen's University Belfast, where he was also involved in varsity athletics, aquatic sports, boxing, golf and tennis. He was a member of the Ireland team between 1932 and 1935, gaining nine internationals caps. After moving to Millom, Ross represented Cumberland in county fixtures.

== See also ==
- List of Ireland national rugby union players
