= Arthur C. Jones =

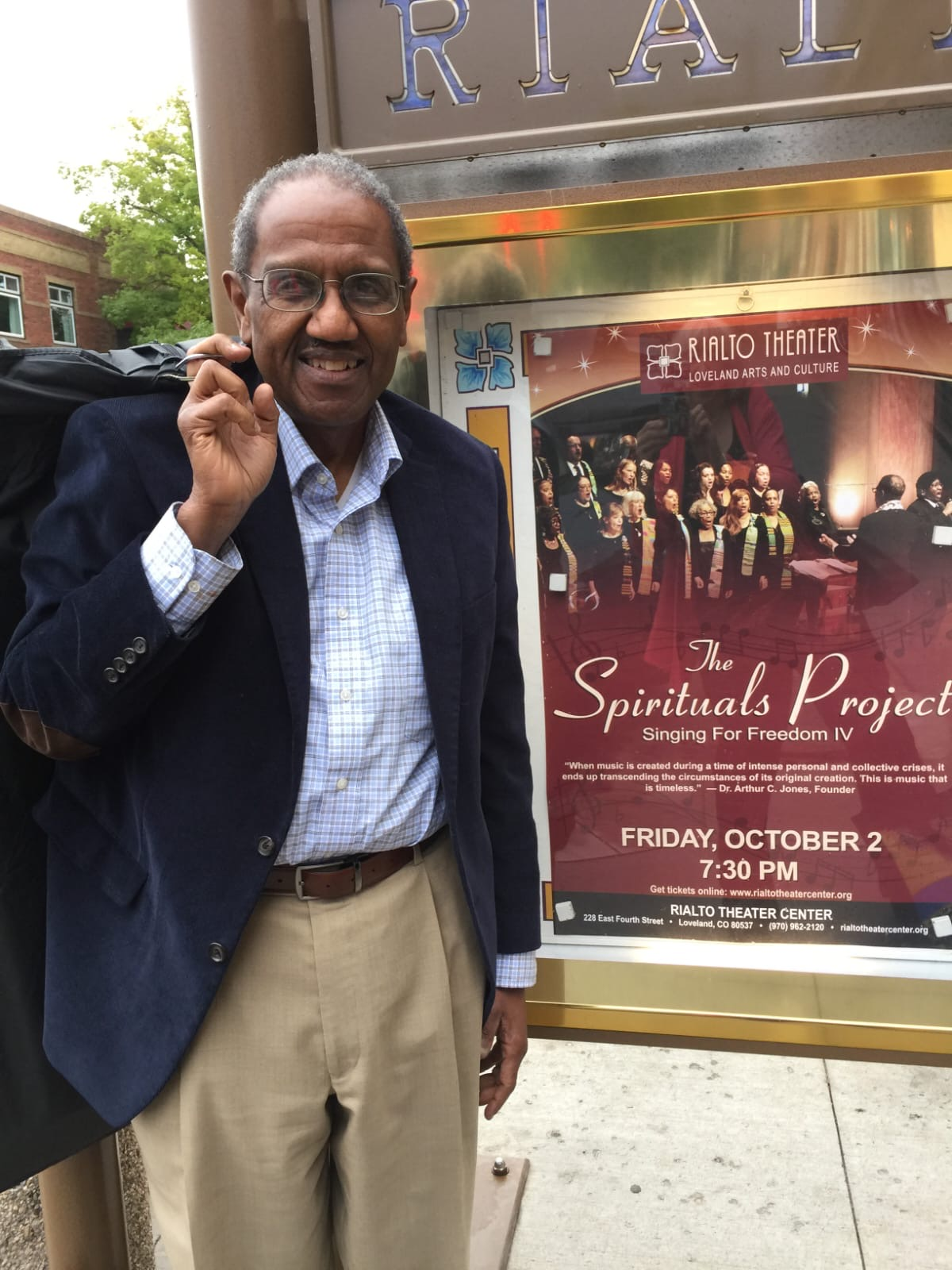
- Born: February 2, 1946 (age 80); The Bronx, New York City, U.S.
- Occupations: Clinical psychologist; educator; music scholar; singer
- Title: Professor Emeritus of Music, Culture and Psychology, University of Denver

Academic background
- Education: Drew University (A.B.); University of Iowa (M.A., Ph.D.)
- Alma mater: Drew University; University of Iowa

Academic work
- Discipline: Clinical psychology; music scholarship
- Sub-discipline: African American spirituals; African American music; multicultural psychology; spirituality
- Institutions: University of Denver; University of Colorado School of Medicine; Bowling Green State University; Sangamon State University; Union Institute & University
- Notable works: Wade in the Water: The Wisdom of the Spirituals
- Website: arthurcjones.com

Arthur C. Jones is an American clinical psychologist, educator, and music scholar. He is professor emeritus of Music, Culture and Psychology at the University of Denver and is the founder of The Spirituals Project, an interdisciplinary research, education, and performance focused on African American spirituals.

He served as President of the University of Denver Faculty Senate from 2014 to 2016.

== Early life and education ==
Jones was born on February 2, 1946 in the Bronx, New York, the youngest of four children of Ferdinand Taylor Jones and Esther Lillian Haggie Jones. He graduated from Andrew Jackson High School in Queens, N.Y. in 1963. He earned an A.B. in psychology from Drew University in 1967, an M.A. in clinical psychology from the University of Iowa in 1969, and a Ph.D. in clinical psychology from the University of Iowa in 1974, where his graduate study was supported by Danforth Foundation and Woodrow Wilson Foundation graduate fellowships. After earning his M.A., he served as a commissioned officer in the United States Naval Reserve (1969–1972) before returning to the University of Iowa to complete his doctoral work.

He later completed a professional reading certificate in the collected works of Carl Jung at the C. G. Jung Center in Denver in 1989.

In 2020, he completed The Living School program at the Center for Action and Contemplation in Albuquerque, New Mexico.

== Career ==
Before joining the University of Denver, he held faculty positions at Sangamon State University (now the University of Illinois at Springfield), Bowling Green State University, and the University of Colorado School of Medicine, where he also served as Special Assistant to the Dean for Diversity Initiatives, and maintained a private clinical psychology practice in Denver from 1981 to 1995.

He joined the University of Denver in 1991 as a Clinical Professor in the Psychology Department. Between 1993 and 2000 he also held a position as a core faculty member of the Graduate School of Interdisciplinary Arts and Sciences at the Union Institute and University in Cincinnati.

Between 2009 and 2016, he held several academic and administrative roles at the Colorado Women's College of the University of Denver, including Academic Chair and Associate Dean. His active work at the University of Denver culminated in three years as a Teaching Professor at the Lamont School of Music between 2016 and 2019, and a final year (2019 – 2020) as Interim Vice Chancellor for Diversity, Equity and Inclusion.

In 1991, Jones began a series of lecture-concert programs, locally and nationally, focused on the cultural, psychological and spiritual functions of the sacred folk songs known as spirituals, which were created and first sung by enslaved Africans in North America.

In 1998 he founded The Spirituals Project, an initiative dedicated to research, education, and performance related to the African American spirituals tradition. The Project was established as a Colorado incorporated nonprofit in 1998 and as a federally incorporated nonprofit in 1999. In 2009, a documentary film “I Can Tell the World” by filmmakers Larry Bograd and Coleen Hubbard was produced that profiled the work of The Spirituals Project Choir.

== Scholarly works ==
Jones is the author of Wade in the Water: The Wisdom of the Spirituals (Orbis Books, 1993), a study of the historical, cultural, psychological and spiritual dimensions of African American spirituals.

His broader scholarly work addresses African American music, cultural history, African American and multicultural psychology, spirituality, with an increased attention over time to the role of spirituals in African American experience and identity.

== Personal life ==
Jones was married to Antonia Pride in 1968, and together they had two sons: Timothy (later Nmutakula), born in 1970, and Sekou, born in 1972. The marriage ended in divorce in 1977. In 1983, he married Christine Chao, and they welcomed a daughter, Joella, born in 1989.

== Selected publications ==
- Jones, Arthur C. (1993). Wade in the Water: The Wisdom of the Spirituals. Orbis Books. ISBN 978-0-88344-923-3.
- Jones, Ferdinand; Jones, Arthur C. (2001). The Triumph of the Soul: Cultural and Psychological Aspects of African American Music. Bloomsbury Academic. ISBN 978-0-275-95365-2.
- Jones, Arthur C. (1979). "Psychopathology and Subfecundity:". Psychosomatic Medicine. 41 (7): 574–575. doi:10.1097/00006842-197911000-00012. ISSN 0033-3174.
- Jones, Arthur C. (1985). "Psychological functioning in Black Americans: A conceptual guide for use in psychotherapy". Psychotherapy: Theory, Research, Practice, Training. 22 (2S): 363–369. doi:10.1037/h0085516. ISSN 1939-1536.
- Jones, Arthur C. (2004), "Black Spirituals, Physical Sensuality, and Sexuality: Notes on a Neglected Field of Inquiry", in Pinn, Anthony B.; Hopkins, Dwight N. (eds.), Loving the Body: Black Religious Studies and the Erotic, New York: Palgrave Macmillan US, pp. 235–246, doi:10.1057/9781403980342_14, ISBN 978-1-4039-8034-2
- Jones, Arthur C. (2005). "The Foundational Influence of Spirituals in African-American Culture: A Psychological Perspective". Black Music Research Journal. 24 (2): 251. doi:10.2307/4145493.
