= Lewis Booth (rugby union) =

English rugby union player

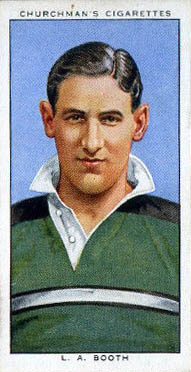
- Full name: Lewis Alfred Booth
- Born: 26 September 1909 Horsforth, Leeds, England
- Died: 25 June 1942 (aged 32) Wadden Sea, near Wieringen, Netherlands

Rugby union career
- Position: Wing
International career
Years	Team	Apps	(Points)
1933–35	England	7	(9)

Pilot officer Lewis Alfred Booth (26 September 1909 – 25 June 1942) was an English international rugby union player.

Booth was born in Horsforth, Leeds, Yorkshire. His father was director of local company L. J. Booth and Sons, a family-run wool manufacturer. He was educated at Giggleswick School and Malsis School.

A Headingley wing three-quarter, Booth was a regular in the Yorkshire sides of the 1930s and gained seven caps for England, scoring three tries. He scored one of England's two tries in their 6–3 win over Scotland in the final 1934 Home Nations fixture, to regain the Calcutta Cup and secure the triple crown.

Booth served as an officer in the Royal Air Force during World War II and died when the plane he was navigating got shot down off the Dutch coast, while taking part in a bombing raid to the German city of Bremen.

== See also ==
- List of England national rugby union players
