= Dai Thomas (rugby union) =

Wales international rugby union footballer

- Born: David John Thomas Swansea, Wales
- Occupation: Police officer

Rugby union career
- Position: Lock
Amateur team(s)
Years	Team	Apps	(Points)
1930-1935	Swansea RFC		
- Glamorgan Police
International career
Years	Team	Apps	(Points)
1930–1935	Wales	11	(0)

David 'Dai' Thomas (30 March 1909 – ?) was a Welsh rugby union lock who played international rugby for Wales and club rugby for Swansea. During the 1934/35 season, Thomas was captain of the Swansea first XV.

== Rugby career ==
Thomas first played for Wales during the 1930 Five Nations Championship against Scotland at Murrayfield. Wales lost by a last minute dropped goal, but Thomas was back for the very next match of the tournament against Ireland, but missed the final, bruising game against France, since referred to as the 'Battle of Colombes'. Thomas was failed to be selected for the entire 1931 Championship, but during that time was amongst the Swansea team that faced the touring South Africans.

Thomas was not selected for the Welsh international against the Springboks, but represented his country for all three games of the 1932 Home Nations Championship before sporadic appearances over the next two years that saw only two caps. Thomas managed to regain his position in 1935 and played all three games under the captaincy of Claude Davey.

=== International matches played ===
Wales

- England 1932, 1933, 1934, 1935
- Ireland 1930, 1932, 1935
- Scotland 1930, 1932, 1933, 1935

== Biography ==
- Smith, David; Williams, Gareth (1980). Fields of Praise: The Official History of The Welsh Rugby Union. Cardiff: University of Wales Press. ISBN 0-7083-0766-3.
