= Bob Barrell =

- Full name: Robert John Barrell
- Born: 1 November 1905 Newtown, Mountain Ash, Wales
- Died: 13 January 1967 (aged 61) Sandridge, Hertfordshire, England
- Occupation: Police officer

Rugby union career
- Position: Prop
International career
Years	Team	Apps	(Points)
1929–33	Wales	4	(3)

Robert John Barrell (1 November 1905 – 13 January 1967) was a Welsh international rugby union player.

Born in Mountain Ash, Barrell was a forward and played his rugby for Cardiff from 1926 to 1934, making a total of 241 appearances. He was an occasional Wales representative during this period, with four caps. His only try came in a home win over France in 1929. He later competed for Penarth.

Barrell worked as a police officer outside of rugby, beginning from his time with Cardiff. He earned a promotion to sergeant while based at Nantymoel and retired from the Glamorgan Constabulary in 1954.

== See also ==
- List of Wales national rugby union players
