= Alan Key (rugby union) =

British Army officer & England international rugby union player

Alan Key OBE TD
- Born: 4 June 1908 Amersham, England
- Died: 2 July 1989 (aged 81) Ploughley, England
- School: Cranleigh School

Rugby union career
- Position: Scrum-half
International career
Years	Team	Apps	(Points)
1930–33	England	2	(0)

Lieutenant colonel Alan Key (4 June 1908 – 2 July 1989) was a British Army officer and England international rugby union player of the 1930s.

Born in Amersham, Buckinghamshire, Key was educated at Cranleigh School in Surrey, where he gained his blues as a stand-off, before becoming a scrum-half for Old Cranleighans. He has the distinction of being first Old Cranleighan to be capped for England and ascended to the club captaincy in 1933.

Key was versatile enough to play in every backline position except fullback in matches for the Barbarians, though he was best suited to scrum-half. He was a Middlesex representative player and gained two England caps, against Ireland at Lansdowne Road in the 1930 Five Nations and Wales at Twickenham in the 1933 Home Nations.

== See also ==
- List of England national rugby union players
