= Philip Turnbull =

Field hockey player

Personal information
- Born: 7 April 1879 Cardiff, Wales
- Died: 20 October 1930 (aged 51) Cardiff, Wales

Sport
- Sport: Field hockey
Senior career
Years	Team	Caps	Goals
1908	Cardiff	-	-
National team
Years	Team	Caps	Goals
1908	Wales		-
Medal record
Representing Great BritainWales
Olympic Games
Bronze medal – third place	1908 London	Team

Philip Bernard Turnbull (7 April 1879 – 20 October 1930) was a field hockey player from Wales who competed in the 1908 Summer Olympics and won a bronze medal as a member of the Welsh team.

== Biography ==
Turnbull was born in Cardiff, the son of a shipbuilding business owner at Turnbull Brothers. He was educated at Downside College in Bath.

With only six teams participating in the field hockey tournament at the 1908 Olympic Games in London, he represented Wales under the Great British flag, where the team were awarded a bronze medal despite Wales only playing in and losing one match. Both he and his cousin Bertrand Turnbull were in the team.

He played club hockey for Cardiff Hockey Club.

One of his sons, Maurice, played Test cricket for England and rugby union for Wales.
