= Arthur Frederick Jones =

Arthur Frederick Jones (1903–1988) was an American journalist and dog-show judge.

== Biography ==
Arthur Frederick Jones was born in Brooklyn, New York on March 3, 1903.

In 1926 (at 20 years of age), he became an assistant editor for Pure-Bred Dogs (now The American Kennel Gazette), the official publication of the American Kennel Club. In 1941, he was made editor, and in 1951, managing editor. He was also Kennel Editor of The New York Times, and was chosen as special editor of dog terms for Webster's New International Dictionary. He supplied much of the information for the K-9 manuals used by the U.S. Army in World War II. He served eight times as master of ceremonies for the National Dog Show. In 1956, Jones was the winner of the Kiblon Memorial Award (the top award in dog-writing, sponsored by the Dog Writers Association of America).

He died in Hillcrest, Rockland County, New York on May 29, 1988.
