= Arthur Jones (rugby union, born 1908) =

- Full name: Arthur Hugh Jones
- Born: 2 October 1908 Bridgend, Wales
- Died: 26 June 1964 (aged 55) Porthcawl, Wales
- Notable relative: Howard Nicholls (son-in-law)

Rugby union career
- Position: Wing
International career
Years	Team	Apps	(Points)
1933	Wales	2	(0)

Arthur Hugh Jones (2 October 1908 — 26 June 1964) was a Welsh international rugby union player.

Born in Bridgend, Jones was a wing three-quarter, capped twice for Wales during the 1933 Home Nations, appearing in matches against England at Twickenham and Scotland at Swansea. His selection came while with Cardiff RFC, which he became captain of in 1937. He also played for Bridgend RFC and London Welsh.

Jones was the father-in-law of Wales international Howard Nicholls.

== See also ==
- List of Wales national rugby union players
