= Ronald Gerrard =

English rugby union footballer and cricketer

- Born: Ronald Anderson Gerrard; 26 January 1912 Hong Kong
- Died: 22 January 1943 (aged 30) near Tobruk, Italian Libya

Rugby union career
- Position: Centre
Amateur team(s)
Years	Team	Apps	(Points)
- Bath
International career
Years	Team	Apps	(Points)
1932–1936	England	14	(0)

Major Ronald Anderson Gerrard (26 January 1912 – 22 January 1943) was an English rugby union international. He also played first-class cricket for Somerset.

Gerrard was a member of two successful Home Nations campaigns with England in 1932 and 1934, the latter a Triple Crown. The Hong Kong born centre played a Test against South Africa when they toured Britain in 1932 and in a win over New Zealand, who toured the British Isles and Canada in 1936.

In addition to his rugby career, Gerrard played three first-class matches, as a batsman, with Somerset in the 1935 County Championship. He did not affect any of the matches, amassing just 36 runs from his five innings.

A Major in the Royal Engineers during World War II, Gerrard fought in North Africa and was killed in action near Tobruk.
