= 1934–35 Scottish Districts season =

Rugby union competition

- Countries: Scotland
- Date: 1934–35
- Matches played: 1

The 1934–35 Scottish Districts season is a record of all the rugby union matches for Scotland's district teams.

== History ==
Glasgow District beat Edinburgh District in the Inter-City match.

== Results ==
| Date | Try | Conversion | Penalty | Dropped goal | Goal from mark | Notes |
|---|---|---|---|---|---|---|
| 1905–1947 | 3 points | 2 points | 3 points | 4 points | 3 points | |

=== Inter-City ===
1 December 1934

| Glasgow District | 3 – 0 | Edinburgh District |
| | Report |

Old Anniesland
Referee: Willie Burnet (Hawick)

Glasgow District:
Edinburgh District:

=== Other Scottish matches ===
None.

=== Trial matches ===
15 December 1934

| Scotland Probables | – | Scotland Possibles |
| | Report |

Murrayfield Stadium

Scotland Probables:
Scotland Possibles:

=== English matches ===
No other District matches played.

=== International matches ===
No touring matches this season.
