= 1934 Home Nations Championship =

Men's rugby union competition

- Date: 20 January - 17 March 1934
- Countries: England; Ireland; Scotland; Wales

Tournament statistics
- Champions: England (12th title)
- Triple Crown: England (10th title)
- Matches played: 6

The 1934 Home Nations Championship was the thirtieth series of the rugby union Home Nations Championship. Including the previous incarnations as the Five Nations, and prior to that, the Home Nations, this was the forty-seventh series of the northern hemisphere rugby union championship. Six matches were played between 20 January and 17 March. It was contested by England, Ireland, Scotland and Wales. It was the first time since the 1913 competition that the table finished without any team tying for places.

== Table ==
Pos	Team	Pld	W	D	L	PF	PA	PD	Pts
1	England	3	3	0	0	28	6	+22	6
2	Wales	3	2	0	1	26	15	+11	4
3	Scotland	3	1	0	2	25	28	−3	2
4	Ireland	3	0	0	3	12	42	−30	0

== Results ==
20 January 1934

Wales	0 – 9	England
		Try: Meikle (2); Warr

Cardiff Arms Park, Cardiff
Attendance: 50,000
Referee: FW Haslett (Ireland)

3 February 1934

Scotland	6 – 13	Wales
Try: Logan; Pen: Ritchie		Try: Cowey; Rees; Con: Jenkins

Murrayfield, Edinburgh
Referee: HLV Day (England)

10 February 1934

Ireland	3 – 13	England
Try: Morgan		Try: Fry (2); Meikle; Con: Gregory (2)

Lansdowne Road, Dublin
Referee: MA Allen (Scotland)

24 February 1934

Scotland	16 – 9	Ireland
Pen: Dick (2); Crawford; Con: Shaw (2); Pen: Allan		Try: Russell; O'Conner

Murrayfield, Edinburgh
Referee: BS Cumberlege (England)

10 March 1934

Wales	13 – 0	Ireland
Try: Fear; Cowey; Jenkins; Con: Jenkins (2)

St Helens, Swansea
Referee: AJ Turnbull (Scotland)

17 March 1934

England	6 – 3	Scotland
Try: Booth; Meikle		Try: Shaw

Twickenham, London
Referee: FW Haslett (Ireland)
