= 1933–34 Scottish Districts season =

Rugby union competition

- Countries: Scotland
- Date: 1933–34
- Matches played: 1

The 1933–34 Scottish Districts season is a record of all the rugby union matches for Scotland's district teams.

== History ==
Edinburgh District beat Glasgow District in the Inter-City match.

== Results ==
Date	Try	Conversion	Penalty	Dropped goal	Goal from mark	Notes
1905–1947	3 points	2 points	3 points	4 points	3 points	

=== Inter-City ===
2 December 1933

Glasgow District	8 – 17	Edinburgh District
	Preview; Report

Old Anniesland
Attendance: 10,000
Referee: Willie Burnet (Hawick)

Glasgow District: J. L. Cotter (Hillhead H.S.F.P.); J. E. Forrest (Glasgow Academicals), A. Ross (Hillhead H.S.F.P.), W. A. Ross (Hillhead H.S.F.P.), and R. W. Shaw (Glasgow H.S.F.P.); W. C. W. Murdoch (Hillhead H.S.F.P.) and I. E. Dawson (Hillhead H.S.F.P.); W. A. Burnet (West of Scotland), A. M. Haddow (Glasgow Academicals), H. C. Kennedy (Glasgow H.S.F.P.), L. B. Lambie (Glasgow H.S.F.P.), G. C. Langlands (Glasgow H.S.F.P.), Ian MacLachlan (Kelvinside Academicals), Ian Mac- Laren (Glasgow H.S.F.P.), and E. A. Young (Hillhead H.S.F.P.) (capt.).
Edinburgh District: K. W. Marshall (Edinburgh Academicals); Jack Park (Royal High School F.P.), W. D. Emslie (Royal High School F.P.), B. R. Tod (Edinburgh Academicals), and J. J. Sanderson (Watsonians); P. M. S. Gedge (Edinburgh Wanderers) and K. S. H. Wilson (Watsonians); N. M. Lund (Edinburgh University), M. S. Stewart (Stewart's College F.P.), James Ritchie (Watsonians), T. S. Brotherstone (Royal High School F.P.), P. W. Tait (Royal High School F.P.), J. G. Watherston (Edinburgh Wanderers). J. D. Lowe (Heriot's F.P.), and A. L. Glover (Stewart's College F.P.)

=== Other Scottish matches ===
18 November 1933

North of Scotland District	–	South of Scotland District
	Report

McKane Park

North:
South:

=== Trial matches ===
13 January 1934

Scotland Probables	–	Scotland Possibles
	Preview

Murrayfield Stadium

Scotland Probables:
Scotland Possibles:

=== English matches ===
No other District matches played.

=== International matches ===
No touring matches this season.
