= Arthur Vaughan Jones =

England international rugby union player

- Born: 25 September 1909 Pontarddulais, Wales
- Died: 4 December 1987 (aged 78) Cape Town, South Africa

Rugby union career
- Position: Wing-forward
International career
Years	Team	Apps	(Points)
1932–33	England	3	(0)

Arthur Vaughan Jones (25 September 1909 – 4 December 1987) was a Welsh-born England international rugby union player of the 1930s.

Born in Pontarddulais, near Swansea, Jones was educated at Pontarddulais Boys' School, where he attended the same class as Wales forward Jim Lang. He was a native Welsh-speaker.

Jones participated in multiple Welsh trials, the first of which ended for him within the first two minutes when he broke his collarbone, then in later opportunities was unable to impress.

A British Army lieutenant, Jones was selected by England on the basis of his army rugby career, which was played entirely in the country. He gained three England caps as a wing-forward, featuring twice in the 1932 Home Nations, before making an appearance against Wales at Twickenham the following year.

== See also ==
- List of England national rugby union players
