= Basil Easterbrook =

English sports journalist and author

Basil Vivian Easterbrook (15 February 1920 – 15 December 1995) was an English sports journalist and author, who was best known for his football and cricket writing.

Easterbrook was cricket and football writer for Kemsley Newspapers and Thomson Regional Newspapers from 1950 to 1983. He contributed the feature article "The Heritage of Our Cricket Grounds" to the 1969 edition of Wisden, and then an article to every edition from 1971 to 1980. He was the chairman of the Cricket Writers' Club in 1965.
