= Archie Skym =

Wales international rugby union footballer

- Born: Archibald Skym; 12 July 1906 Drefach, Carmarthenshire, Wales
- Died: 15 June 1970 (aged 63) Cardiff, Wales
- Height: 180 cm (5 ft 11 in)
- Weight: 86 kg (13 st 8 lb)
- Occupation(s): Miner; Policeman

Rugby union career
- Position: Prop
Amateur team(s)
Years	Team	Apps	(Points)
1926	Tumble RFC		
1926–1929	Llanelli RFC		
1929–1935	Cardiff RFC		
–	Carmarthenshire Police		
–	Glamorgan Police RFC		
–	Barbarians F.C.		
International career
Years	Team	Apps	(Points)
1928–1935	Wales	20	(6)

Archie Skym (12 July 1906 – 15 June 1970) was an international rugby union player for Wales, who played club rugby for Llanelli and Cardiff. Skym played as a prop and was renowned for his strength and vigour, and was nicknamed "The butcher". An excellent scrummager, he was known for his ability to lift opponents in the front row. Skym had good hands and could dribble with notable skill.

== Club career ==
Due to his father's religious beliefs, Skym was not allowed to play rugby as a child, but during a nine-month miners strike Skym joined a local team, at his home town of Drefach, as something to do. Although an adult when he started playing, he picked up the game quickly and soon moved to Tumble Rugby Club. He impressed in his play and on 26 December 1926 he was playing for top-flight team Llanelli against London Welsh.

Although a Welsh international by early 1928, Llanelli didn't pick him to play once during the 1928/29 season, and by February Skym had enough and left for rival team Cardiff. With regular matches for Cardiff, Skym was back in the Welsh team. An excellent 1931/32 season including a great game for Cardiff against the South African team, saw Skym cement his place at international level. In January 1935, in a match against Swansea, Skym broke his ankle but stayed on the pitch for the entire game. It was injury that ended his international career and he retired from rugby at the end of the season.

== International career ==
Skym played twenty matches for Wales, his first cap was against England on 21 January 1928. He would score two tries, and was part of the Wales team that in 1933 finally beat England at Twickenham.

=== International matches played ===
Wales

- England 1928, 1930, 1931, 1932, 1933, 1935
- France 1928, 1930, 1931
- Ireland 1928, 1930, 1931, 1932, 1933
- Scotland 1928, 1930, 1931, 1932, 1933
- South Africa 1931

== Bibliography ==
- Smith, David; Williams, Gareth (1980). Fields of Praise: The Official History of The Welsh Rugby Union. Cardiff: University of Wales Press. ISBN 0-7083-0766-3.
- Thomas, Wayne (1979). A Century of Welsh Rugby Players. Ansells Ltd.
