= Wilf Wooller =

Wales international rugby union footballer & cricketer

- Wilfred Wooller in 1948

Personal information
- Full name: Wilfred Wooller
- Born: 20 November 1912; Rhos-on-Sea, Denbighshire, Wales
- Died: 10 March 1997 (aged 84); Cardiff, Glamorgan, Wales
- Batting: Right-handed
- Bowling: Right-arm medium-fast

Domestic team information
- Years: Team
- 1947–1948: Marylebone Cricket Club
- 1938–1962: Glamorgan
- 1935–1936: Cambridge University
- 1930–1934: Denbighshire

Career statistics
Competition	First-class
Matches	430
Runs scored	13,593
Batting average	22.57
100s/50s	5/64
Top score	128
Balls bowled	59,547
Wickets	958
Bowling average	29.96
5 wickets in innings	43
10 wickets in match	5
Best bowling	8/45
Catches/stumpings	412/–
- Source: Cricinfo, 11 June 2012

Wilfred Wooller (20 November 1912 – 10 March 1997) was a Welsh sportsman (playing cricket, rugby union, and football), cricket administrator, and journalist.

He was acclaimed as one of the greatest all-round sportsmen that Wales has ever produced. He captained Glamorgan County Cricket Club for 14 years, was Secretary for thirty and President for six.

== Personal history ==
Wilf Wooller was born at Rhos-on-Sea in Denbighshire. He was educated at John Bright School, Llandudno, Rydal School (now Rydal Penrhos) and Christ's College, Cambridge, where he graduated with a third-class degree in Archaeology and Anthropology in 1936.

He married twice, first to Gillian Windsor-Clive, an unsuccessful wartime marriage that was dissolved in 1946, and in 1948 to Enid James. The couple had five children. Wooller survived incarceration by the Japanese in the Changi prisoner of war camp in Singapore during World War II. He was a successful BBC broadcaster and Sunday Telegraph sports journalist.

== Cricket career ==
Wooller's first cricket was played at Rydal School and the local club, Colwyn Bay where he played alongside his father Roy and brothers Jack and Gordon. He made his Minor Counties debut for Denbighshire in 1930 and his first-class debut for Cambridge University in May 1935 against Sussex. In the same year he was selected for Cambridge University against Oxford University, so becoming a Double Blue.

After graduating from Cambridge, Wooller took employment in Cardiff and joined the St Fagans club north of the city. His bowling performances and aggressive batting attracted the attention of Maurice Turnbull, Glamorgan's influential county captain and he was selected for the Championship match against Yorkshire at the Cardiff Arms Park ground. He made his first appearance on 15 June 1938 and in his first bowling spell for the county took 3 wickets for 22 runs in nine overs.

After the war Wooller was appointed Captain-Secretary of Glamorgan in 1947 and led them to an unexpected County Championship triumph in 1948. As a formidable all rounder, he was twice thwarted from playing Test cricket for England in 1948–49 and 1951–52, due to business commitments. He retired from first-class cricket in 1960 (reappearing briefly in 1962) and as Secretary in 1977. He served as a Test selector from 1955 to 1961.

== Rugby career ==
Wilf Wooller
- Born: Wilfred Wooller; 20 November 1912 Rhos on Sea, Wales
- Died: 10 March 1997 (aged 84) Cardiff, Glamorgan, Wales
- Height: 6 ft 2 in (1.88 m)
- Weight: 14 st (89 kg)
- School: Rydal School
- University: Cambridge University

Rugby union career
- Position: Centre
Amateur team(s)
Years	Team	Apps	(Points)
–	Rydal School		
–	Colwyn Bay RFC		
–	Sale		
–	Glamorgan		
–	Cambridge University R.U.F.C.		
–	Cardiff RFC		
–	The Army		
–	Barbarian F.C.		
International career
Years	Team	Apps	(Points)
1933–1939	Wales	18	(26)

Wooller first played rugby for Rydal School and played his first international game for Wales while still a schoolboy. This was mainly due to the fact that in October 1932 Wooller failed to pass Latin, and therefore could not progress to Cambridge. In 1932 he played a few games for North Wales Schoolboys, then he turned out for Sale at centre in the school holidays. While representing Sale he played alongside established Welsh international Claude Davey and the two joined up in a 1933 Welsh selection game as part of the 'Possibles' team. Wooller himself believed the selectors were 'mucking about' with him and Davey, so the two were over physical with their opposing numbers, which forced the selectors to choose both of them to face England at Twickenham in 1933. The 1933 England game is seen as a classic in Welsh rugby history as it was the game when the 'Twickenham bogey' was broken after nine failed attempts to beat England on their home ground. Wooller played his part in the match, which is normally remembered as Ronnie Boon's game, when he chased a breakaway Walter Elliot with forty yards to the tryline and tackled him ten yards short of a try.

Wooller won 18 international rugby union caps for Wales and represented Cardiff RFC at club level. In 1935 he was inspirational in the Welsh victory over the All Blacks. He was a Cambridge blue in 1935 and 1936.

=== International rugby matches played ===
Wales

- England 1933, 1935, 1936, 1937, 1939
- Ireland 1933, 1935, 1936, 1937, 1938, 1939
- Scotland 1933, 1935, 1936, 1937, 1938, 1939
- New Zealand 1935

== Football and other sporting career ==
Wooller played for Cardiff City at soccer, once scoring a hat-trick at centre-forward. He also signed for Barry Town in 1938, with the intent of playing for the club on week nights while continuing his rugby at weekends. Wooller also represented Wales at squash racquets and the Cardiff Athletic Club at bowls.

== See also ==
- List of cricket and rugby union players

== Bibliography ==
- Billot, John (1972). All Blacks in Wales. Ferndale: Ron Jones Publications.
- Godwin, Terry (1984). The International Rugby Championship 1883–1983. London: Willows Books. ISBN 0-00-218060-X.
- Smith, David; Williams, Gareth (1980). Fields of Praise: The Official History of The Welsh Rugby Union. Cardiff: University of Wales Press. ISBN 0-7083-0766-3.
- Thomas, Wayne (1979). A Century of Welsh Rugby Players. Ansells Ltd.
- Hignell, Andrew (1995). The Skipper, A Biography of Wilf Wooller. Royston: Limlow Books Ltd. ISBN 1-874524-12-2.
