= Ronnie Boon =

Wales international rugby union footballer

- Born: Ronald Winston Boon; 11 June 1909 Barry, Wales
- Died: 3 August 1998 (aged 89) Waipukurau, New Zealand
- School: Barry County School
- University: Trinity College, Carmarthen
- Occupation: teacher

Rugby union career
- Position: Wing
Amateur team(s)
Years	Team	Apps	(Points)
1929–1939	Cardiff RFC		
1931–38	Dunfermline RFC		
1932–1933	Barbarian F.C.		
–	London Welsh RFC		
–	New Brighton		
International career
Years	Team	Apps	(Points)
1930–1933	Wales	12	(20)

Ronald Winston Boon (11 June 1909 – 3 August 1998) was an international rugby union wing for Wales who played club rugby for Cardiff. Boon possessed a tremendous self-confidence in his own ability and this was reflected in his nickname Cocky. Boon was a quick runner, representing Wales at the 220-yard sprint, and was an excellent drop kicker. He is best known in Welsh rugby as the man who scored all seven points in 1933 against England to end the 'Twickenham bogey', and along with Jack Morley is seen as one of the greatest Welsh wings since the country's first Golden Era of rugby.

== Rugby career ==
Boon began his career at Barry Parade Club, before playing at schoolboy level with Barry Grammar and then representing Wales for Welsh Secondary Schools. Boon played for several club teams, including London Welsh which he would become club secretary during most of the 1960s, but spent the majority of his time at Cardiff. He joined the blues during the 1928/29 season, and by 1930 he was selected to represent Wales in a Five Nations Championship match against Scotland in an all-Cardiff three-quarter line alongside Davies, Jones and Turnbull. Wales lost the match, and although Boon missed the next game against Ireland he had impressed some quarters of the sporting press. 'Old Stager' reported that Boon's covering tackling against Scotland's Ian Smith had been impressive and that he had shown an '...extraordinary facility for retaining a grasp on whatever part of his anatomy he could lay his hands'. For the final game against France, Boon's Wales rival Jack Morley had been selected to play for the British Lions, so Boon was reselected in a notoriously aggressive match which resulted in a Welsh win.

Boon played in all of the 1931 Five Nations Championship which saw Wales win the tournament for the first time in eight years. Under the captaincy of Jack Bassett, Wales won three of the games, and drew against England. Boon scored his first international try during the campaign in the game against Scotland, though he was forced to work hard for his score due to the poor distribution of Claude Davey. The next season Boon was selected to face the touring South Africans, but the game was played in atrocious icy weather and after Wales lost Bassett was blamed for not switching his team's style of play to accommodate the conditions. Boon was reselected for the 1932 Home Nations Championship and Wales won their two opening matches against England and Scotland, Boon scoring a try in both games and also managed a 'freak' drop goal in the England match. Wales lost the final game against Ireland, robbing them of a successive championship crown.

In 1931, having qualified as a teacher, Boon left Wales to study at Dunfermline College of Education, before teaching at Dunfermline High School, while in Scotland he turned out for Dunfermline, though would still play for Cardiff whenever he could. In 1933 Boon was chosen to face England at Twickenham, a stadium Wales had failed to win at in ten attempts. Captained by Watcyn Thomas, Boon later argued that the Welsh forwards deserved all the credit for the Welsh victory even though Boon scored all the Welsh points in a 7–3 victory. At half-time, England led the game 3–0 with a try from Walter Elliot; but soon after the restart, England's Ronald Gerrard kicked a loose ball across the ground straight into Boon's arms, and he calmly drop kicked the ball through the posts to take a 4–3 lead. A few minutes later Boon had extended the lead when the ball came back from a maul to Davey, who passed to Boon, and with the English defence out of position, he crossed at the corner and touched the ball down behind the posts for a try. Vivian Jenkins converted the try which was registered on the score board, but strangely the referee would later disallow the attempt after the game. The decision did not change the result, and Wales had finally beaten the 'Twickenham bogey' and Boon was hailed as a Welsh hero. Boon missed the next game against Scotland due to a knee injury but was back to face Ireland. Wales lost the game and the Welsh selectors dropped 11 of the squad from future fixtures. Those that never played for Wales again after that game included Watcyn Thomas, Arthur Lemon, Harry Bowcott, Lonza Bowdler and Boon himself.

=== International matches played ===
Wales

- England 1931, 1932, 1933
- France 1930, 1931
- Ireland 1931, 1932, 1933
- Scotland 1930, 1931, 1932
- South Africa 1931

== Cricket career ==
Before his move to Dunfermline, Boon tried out at cricket for Glamorgan. He played just eleven first class games, bowling only 11 overs and averaging just 13.47 with the bat.

== Territorial Army ==
Shortly after his move to Scotland, Boon was commissioned a second lieutenant in the 56th (Highland) Medium Brigade, Royal Artillery, Territorial Army on 3 May 1933, He was and promoted to lieutenant on 3 May 1936. He transferred to 227th Anti-Aircraft Battery on 1 February 1938, but with his move south to Brighton, transferred to the TA reserve of officers, on the list of 71st (Forth) Anti-Aircraft Brigade. Although he remained in the reserve until 30 September 1959 when he reached the age limit for service, he does not appear to have served in the Second World War, presumably because teaching was a reserved occupation. He also represented the TA at rugby.

== Later life ==
Boon stayed at Dunfermline until 1938, before heading south to Brighton. He would later become an inspector of schools and after returning to Wales became a councillor for South Glamorgan County Council. Boon kept his links with rugby and as well as becoming secretary of London Welsh from 1961 to 1969, he also became president of Barry RFC and served on the Sports Council of Wales. Boon emigrated to New Zealand in 1995 and died there in 1998.

== Bibliography ==
- Billot, John (1974). Springboks in Wales. Ferndale: Ron Jones Publications.
- Goodwin, Terry (1984). The International Rugby Championship 1883–1983. London: Willows Books. ISBN 0-00-218060-X.
- Smith, David; Williams, Gareth (1980). Fields of Praise: The Official History of The Welsh Rugby Union. Cardiff: University of Wales Press. ISBN 0-7083-0766-3.
- Thomas, Wayne (1979). A Century of Welsh Rugby Players. Ansells Ltd.
