= Harry Bowcott =

Welsh rugby union player (1907–2004)

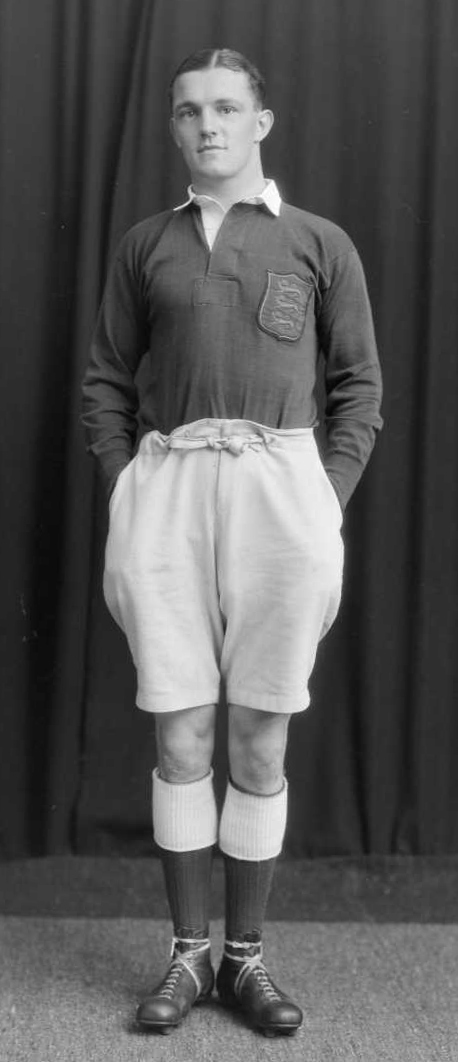
- Bowcott in New Zealand in 1930
- Born: Henry Morgan Bowcott; 30 April 1907 Cardiff, Wales
- Died: 14 December 2004 (aged 97) Wenvoe, Wales
- School: Cardiff High School
- University: St Catharine's College, Cambridge

Rugby union career
- Position: Centre
Amateur team(s)
Years	Team	Apps	(Points)
1927–1928	Cambridge University R.U.F.C.		
–	Cardiff RFC		
–	London Welsh RFC		
–	London Wasps		
–	Barbarian F.C.		
International career
Years	Team	Apps	(Points)
1929–1933	Wales	8	(3)
1930	Great Britain	5	(3)

Henry Morgan Bowcott (30 April 1907 – 14 December 2004) was a Welsh international rugby union centre who played club rugby for Cardiff and London Welsh and later became president of the Welsh Rugby Union.

== Club career ==
Bowcott was a product of the Welsh Secondary Schools Rugby Union system, playing competitive matches while still a schoolboy. Educated at Cardiff High School he was taught rugby by school's rugby coach Eric Evans. Bowcott was part of the Wales Secondary Schools team that beat Yorkshire Schools 18–13 at Pontypridd in April 1926, playing alongside him in that young team were future Welsh internationals J.D. Bartlett and Guy Morgan. He attended St Catharine's College, Cambridge, and while at university was awarded a Sporting Blue, playing on the winning team in the 1927 and 1928 Varsity matches. Bowcott would later play for Cardiff and then London Welsh when he moved to London to become a civil servant.

Bowcott later became a Welsh selector from 1963 to 1974, and in 1974 was made president of the Welsh Rugby Union. He died in 2004 in Wenvoe, Vale of Glamorgan at the age of 97.

== International rugby career ==
Bowcott was first capped for Wales in 1929, while still at Cambridge, at Swansea against Scotland alongside fellow school friend Guy Morgan. The next year Bowcott was captain of Wales, and he would play for his country on eight occasions. He was also part of the famous 1933 Welsh team that finally beat England at Twickenham. Although it was Ronnie Boon who scored all the Welsh points, Bowcott's kicking during the second half of the match ensured that the English were unable to get back into the game.

Bowcott was chosen to join the Lions on their tour of New Zealand and Australia in 1930, and played in 20 of the 27 matches, including all five test matches. He was partnered at centre with Carl Aarvold, a former light blue.

=== International matches played ===
Wales

- England 1930, 1931, 1933
- France 1929
- Ireland 1929, 1933
- Scotland 1929, 1931

Great Britain

- Australia 1930
- New Zealand 1930, 1930, 1930, 1930

== Bibliography ==
- Smith, David; Williams, Gareth (1980). Fields of Praise: The Official History of The Welsh Rugby Union. Cardiff: University of Wales Press. ISBN 0-7083-0766-3.
