= Vivian Jenkins =

British Lions & Wales international rugby union footballer

- Born: Vivian Gordon James Jenkins; 2 November 1911 Port Talbot, Wales
- Died: 5 January 2004 (aged 92) Harpenden, England
- Height: 6 ft (1.83 m)
- Weight: 13 st 7 lb (86 kg)
- School: Llandovery College
- University: Jesus College, Oxford
- Occupation: Journalist

Rugby union career
- Position: Full-back
Amateur team(s)
Years	Team	Apps	(Points)
1930–32	Oxford University	3	
- London Welsh
International career
Years	Team	Apps	(Points)
1933–39	Wales	14	(36)
1938	British Lions	1	(9)

Vivian Gordon James "Viv" Jenkins (2 November 1911 – 5 January 2004) was a Welsh rugby union player who, having taught Classics and Games at Dover College, went on to have a successful career as a sports journalist. He won 14 caps for Wales and 1 cap for the British and Irish Lions. He also played first-class cricket with Glamorgan and Oxford University.

== Early life ==
Jenkins was born in Port Talbot but grew up near Bridgend. He attended Llandovery College in Carmarthenshire and later Jesus College, Oxford.

== Rugby career ==
Jenkins played rugby for Jesus College and represented the school's side at Twickenham on three occasions. In 1932, he was offered a chance to play for his home club Bridgend RFC in a tie against Newport RFC. His performances for Bridgend led to him receiving a call up to the Wales national rugby union team within a month to play against England on 21 January 1933. Wales won the match 7–3, the first time the side had won at Twickenham for 23 years.

The following year, Jenkins missed the opening match of the 1934 Home Nations Championship against England. He rejoined the side ahead of its victory over Scotland, in which he kicked two conversions, and became the first Welsh full back to score a try in an international fixture when he scored ran in a try against Ireland in the final match. In 1935, Jenkins and teammate Wilf Wooller inspired Wales to victory over New Zealand.

Jenkins was part of the 1938 British Lions tour to South Africa where he was named vice-captain to Sam Walker. Although disrupted by injury, he was the team's second-highest scorer with 50 points during the tour. He won his final cap for Wales the following year, in a 3–0 defeat to England.

== Personal life ==
Jenkins married Susan Fraser in 1940 and the couple had one son together. His wife died in 1984. After graduating from Jesus College, Jenkins took up a teaching position at Dover College alongside his sporting career.

At the start of the Second World War, Jenkins joined the Territorial Army and served in the anti-aircraft command where he reached the rank of captain. After the war ended, Jenkins became a rugby reporter for the News of the World and later The Sunday Times. He served as the editor of Rothmans Rugby Yearbook for 11 years and wrote several books on the sport.
