= Watcyn Thomas =

Wales international rugby union footballer

- Born: Watcyn Gwyn Thomas; 16 January 1906 Llanelli, Wales
- Died: 10 August 1977 (aged 71) Birmingham, England
- School: Llanelli County School
- University: University College, Swansea
- Occupation: Teacher

Rugby union career
- Position: Number 8
Amateur team(s)
Years	Team	Apps	(Points)
- Swansea RFC
–	Llanelli RFC		
–	London Welsh RFC		
–	Barbarian F.C.		
–	Waterloo R.F.C.		
International career
Years	Team	Apps	(Points)
1927–1933	Wales	14	(6)

Watcyn Thomas (16 January 1906 – 10 August 1977) was a Welsh rugby union player who captained Wales in the early 1930s.

Thomas was born in Llanelli and educated at Llanelli County School and at University College, Swansea. While still at school he was the first captain of the newly formed Welsh Secondary Schools XV in 1924. He then joined Llanelli RFC, moving to Swansea in December 1927. A teacher by profession, he moved to St Helens to teach at Cowley Grammar School in 1929, and played rugby for Waterloo and Lancashire, captaining Lancashire to the championship in 1934–35.

After Llanelli's victory against the touring New Zealand Maoris, he won his first cap for Wales against England in 1927. Against Scotland in 1931 he played for 70 minutes with a broken collarbone and scored a try. As captain he led Wales to victory over England at Twickenham in 1933, overcoming the "Twickenham bogey" that had haunted Wales. However, after the match against Ireland the same year, Thomas fell out with the selectors, who had selected a prop as flanker and a flanker as prop for the match. Thomas ignored this and played them in their usual positions, and never played for Wales again.

In 1936 he moved to Birmingham to teach at King Edward VI School Aston, and died in that city in 1977. An extension to a building at the school, opened in May 2008, is named in his honour.

He was the first Welsh man to be president of the English Schools Rugby Football Union.

== Biography ==
- Hughes, Gareth (1983) One Hundred Years of Scarlet (Llanelli Rugby Football Club) ISBN 0-9509159-0-4
- Smith, David; Williams, Gareth (1980). Fields of Praise: The Official History of The Welsh Rugby Union. Cardiff: University of Wales Press. ISBN 0-7083-0766-3.
