= Edward John Lewis =

Wales international rugby union footballer

- Born: Edward John Lewis; 5 December 1859 Llandovery, Wales
- Died: 8 June 1925 (aged 65) London, England
- School: Llandovery College
- University: Christ's College, Cambridge; St Bartholomew's Hospital
- Occupation: medical doctor

Rugby union career
- Position: Half-back
Amateur team(s)
Years	Team	Apps	(Points)
- Llandovery College
International career
Years	Team	Apps	(Points)
1881	Wales	1	(0)

Edward John Lewis (5 December 1859 – 8 June 1925) was a Welsh medical doctor and international rugby union half-back who played club rugby for Llandovery College and international rugby for Wales. He won just a single game for Wales when he was selected for the first Welsh rugby international.

== Personal life ==
Lewis was born in 1859 in Llandovery to John Lewis, and was educated first at Llandovery College and then graduated to Christ's College, Cambridge in 1878. He gained his BA in 1882 and his Bachelor of Medicine in 1887 from St Bartholomew's Hospital. Lewis continued with his studies throughout his career, and was awarded his LSA in 1884, MRCS in 1884 and his FRCS in 1890. He completed his senior house officer period at St Batholomew's, before becoming a consulting physician at Kilburn Dispensary. He began his speciality in pediatrics when he took up a position as surgeon at Clergy Orphan School in Marylebone, later taking a post as Senior Resident Medical Officer at Great Ormond Street Hospital. His final post was as Resident Medical Officer at the Royal Free Hospital in London.

== Rugby career ==
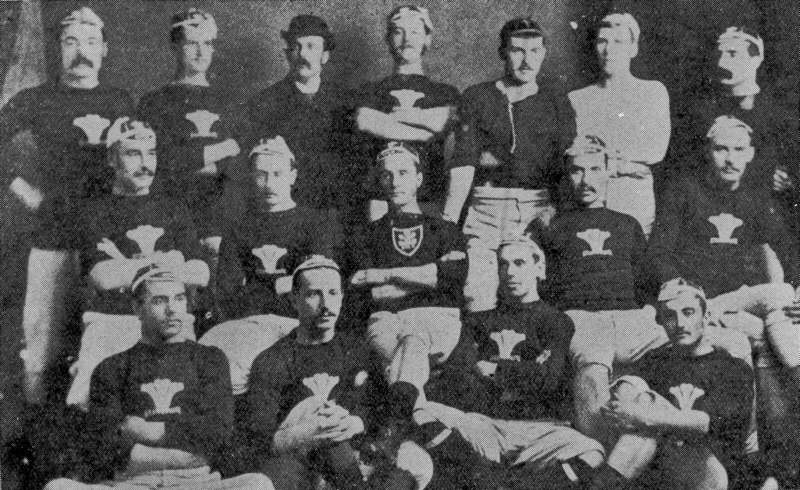
The first Welsh team, Lewis is sat in the front row, far left

When Newport Athletic secretary, Richard Mullock, was successful in gaining an agreed fixture from the Rugby Football Union between the English team and a yet to be formed Wales side; he had a short period to recruit a Welsh team. Mullock had future plans to form a Welsh Rugby Union, so selected a team of 'gentlemen players' that represented a wide spread of clubs from around Wales. Lewis was not only an ex-Cambridge student, having graduated from Christ's College but also represented Llandovery, and was called up to represent the first Welsh team. Lewis was placed at the key position of half-back, paired with Llandaff's Leonard Watkins. The game was a disaster for the Welsh team. The team was badly organised, having never played together before, and several players out of position. In the first ten minutes of the start of the game, both Lewis and Wales forward B. B. Mann were injured, both eventually leaving the field of play before the final whistle. Wales were totally out-classed, losing by eight goals to nil, and Lewis never represented his country again.

=== International matches played ===
Wales

- England 1881

== Bibliography ==
- Jenkins, Vivian (1981). Rothmans Rugby Yearbook 1981-82. Aylesbury: Rothmans Publications Ltd. ISBN 0-907574-05-X.
- Smith, David; Williams, Gareth (1980). Fields of Praise: The Official History of The Welsh Rugby Union. Cardiff: University of Wales Press. ISBN 0-7083-0766-3.
