= Rex Willis =

British Lions & Wales international rugby union footballer

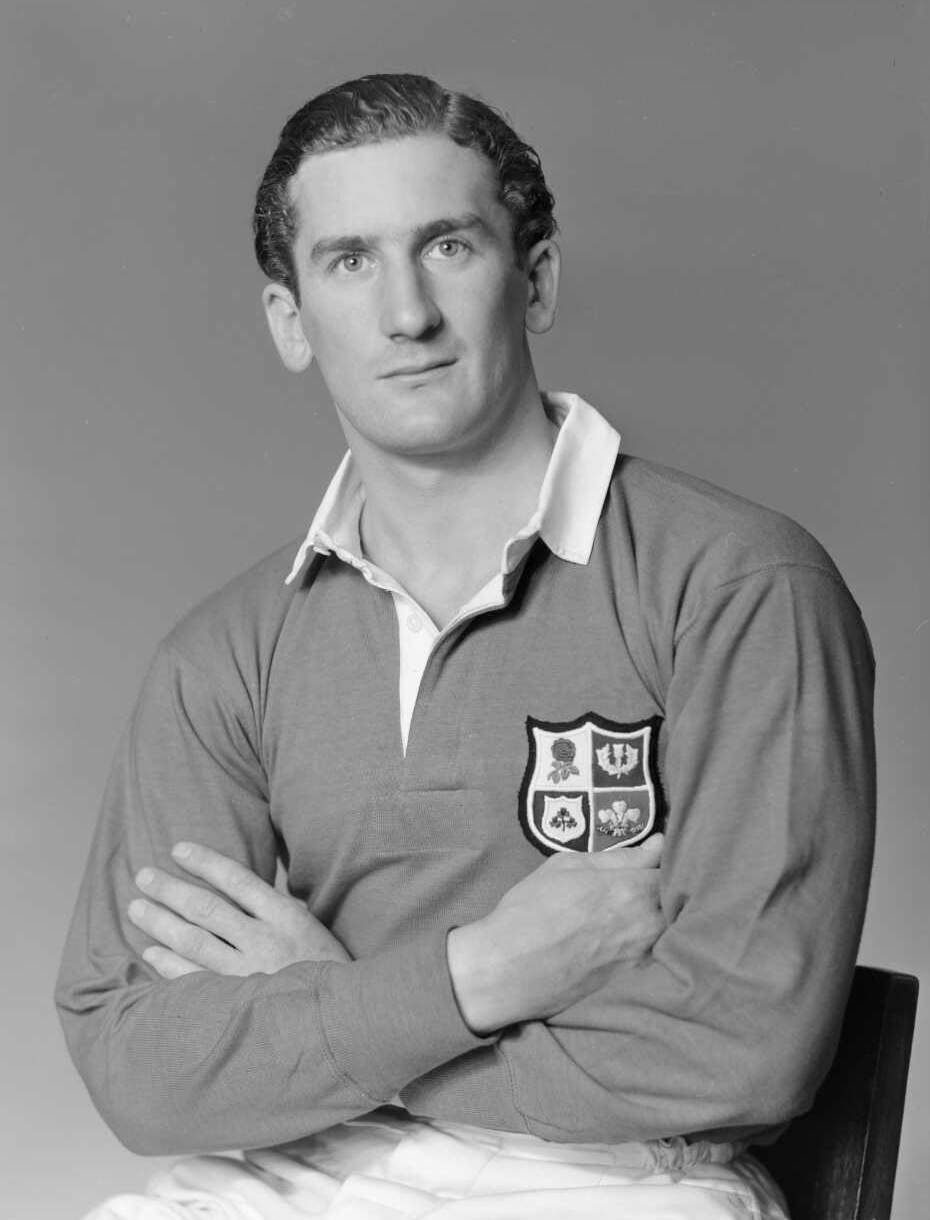
- Willis in New Zealand in 1950
- Born: William Rex Willis; 25 October 1924 Ystrad, Rhondda, Wales
- Died: 19 January 2000 (aged 75)
- School: The Cathedral School, Llandaff; Pangbourne Nautical College
- Occupation: businessman

Rugby union career
- Position: Scrum half
Amateur team(s)
Years	Team	Apps	(Points)
- Llandaff RFC
?-1956	Cardiff RFC		
1951–1954	Barbarian F.C.	4	(0)
International career
Years	Team	Apps	(Points)
1950–1955	Wales	21	(0)
1950	British Lions	3	(0)

William Rex Willis (25 October 1924 – 19 January 2000) was a Welsh international rugby union scrum-half who played club rugby for Cardiff and invitational rugby for the Barbarians. He won 21 caps for Wales and was selected to play in the British Lions on the 1950 tour of Australia and New Zealand.

He played the last half-hour of the 1952 Five Nations Championship against Scotland with his jaw broken in several places.

== Rugby career ==
=== Early career ===
Willis was educated in England before boarding at The Cathedral School, Llandaff, and at Pangbourne Nautical College in Berkshire. During WW2 he served in the Royal Navy. He returned to Wales once he was demobilised. He initially joined Cardiff based rugby club Llandaff before later switching to Cardiff RFC. At Cardiff he was the under-study for Welsh captain, Haydn Tanner and would cover his position while Tanner was away on international duties. During this period Willis linked up with fellow Rhondda born Cardiff player, Cliff Morgan, a relationship that would last throughout their club and country careers.

When Tanner retired during the 1949/50 season, Willis was promoted into his position and gained regular first-class rugby. Although ignored for Welsh trials during 1949, the disastrous Five Nations Championship of that year forced the selectors to look for a new half-back partnership. Willis was chosen alongside team mate Billy Cleaver to face England at Twickenham in the opening game of the 1950 Championship in front of the largest crowd ever seen to date at the stadium. Willis had an excellent match, releasing Cleaver, who in turn controlled the match which saw Wales win the game. In the next game against Scotland, Willis protected Cleaver from the Scottish back row which resulted in Cleaver scoring a drop goal. With tries from Thomas and Ken Jones Wales ran in easy winners after subduing the Scottish pack in the first half of the game. Willis kept his place for the next game in a narrow win against Ireland, which saw Wales lift the Triple Crown, and in the final game, victory over France resulted in the first Grand Slam for Wales since 1911.

=== British Lions ===
After his performance during the Championship, Willis, along with Cardiff backs Cleaver, Jones, Williams and Matthews, was chosen for the British Lions in their 1950 tour of Australia and New Zealand. Unfortunately for Willis, the excellent Rimmer and Black were also on the tour and were picked ahead of Willis. The tactical spoiling of the All Blacks was too much for the smaller scrum-halves, and Willis was drafted in for the Fourth Test at Auckland, and retained his place for the final two tests in Australia.

Willis was back for all four matches in the 1951 Five Nations Championship again under the captaincy of John Gwilliam, who had led the team to their Grand Slam victory the previous year. Willis was now partnered with Cliff Morgan at Cardiff, but with Wales he linked up with Glyn Davies. Morale was high after a one sided affair in their opening game against England, but Willis experienced his first loss with Wales when the team was beaten 19–0 by an inexperienced Scottish team. Despite the loss the Welsh selectors kept faith with the players for the next match, dropping only one player, Willis's partner, Davies. This allowed the introduction of Morgan, who gained his first cap in a three all draw with Ireland.

=== Against South Africa and New Zealand ===
Towards the end on 1951, Willis faced the touring South African's in three games. The first was for Cardiff in October, when at the Cardiff Arms Park, his club team lost by a single point. Willis faced the same team two months later when he was selected to represent Wales against the tourists. It was a game Wales should have won, but the backs, and specifically Cliff Morgan played a poor kicking game that wasted excellent work by the Welsh pack. In his last game against South Africa, Willis was chosen for the invitational Barbarians team in the final match of the tour and for the third time Willis found himself on the losing side.

Willis played only two games of the 1952 Five Nations Championship, but played his part in a second Grand Slam winning year. He was instrumental in allowing Morgan to regain his form through his defensive shielding of his club partner during the first game against England; but after breaking his jaw in the Scottish game missed the final two matches of the tournament. In the 1953 Championship he was considered not fit enough to face England, and was forced to leave the field when he injured his shoulder against Scotland.

As in 1951, Willis was chosen to face another touring team on three occasions in 1953, when Cardiff, Wales and the Barbarians played the All Blacks. Unlike the South African games though, in two of these games Willis was on the victorious side. For Cardiff, Willis was at his best while in the game for Wales, Willis and Morgan were focused and steady, and in the last ten minutes shepherded their country to its final win over New Zealand that century. The Barbarians were not so successful, losing 5–19, though Willis was given the privilege of captaining the team.

=== Wales captaincy and later career ===
Willis was selected for all four matches of the 1954 Five Nations Championship and although losing the opening game to England, the team won the overall Championship on score difference. In the third match of the tournament against France, Willis was awarded the captaincy. The captaincy switched from Ken Jones to Bleddyn Williams before Willis was given the captaincy again in the second match of the 1955 Championship versus Scotland. It was the only match Wales lost that year, but did not stop them winning the tournament for the fourth time that decade.

The final Welsh game of 1955 was also the last for Willis, though he continued playing for Cardiff until the end of the 1957/58 season. In 1955 he turned down an invite to tour again with the British Lions, even though there was supposed to be a bar on inviting players over the age of 30.

=== International matches played ===
Wales

- England 1950, 1951, 1952, 1954, 1955
- France 1950, 1951, 1954, 1955
- Ireland 1950, 1951, 1954, 1955
- New Zealand 1953
- Scotland 1950, 1951, 1952, 1953, 1954, 1955
- South Africa 1951

British Lions

- Australia 1950, 1950
- New Zealand 1950

He was the son of Cinema owner William Elias Willis and became a director of Willis Cinemas Ltd which had offices above the Globe Cinema, Wellfield Road, Penylan.

== Bibliography ==
- Billot, John (1972). All Blacks in Wales. Ferndale: Ron Jones Publications.
- Billot, John (1974). Springboks in Wales. Ferndale: Ron Jones Publications.
- Godwin, Terry (1984). The International Rugby Championship 1883-1983. London: Willows Books. ISBN 0-00-218060-X.
- Griffiths, John (1987). The Phoenix Book of International Rugby Records. London: Phoenix House. ISBN 0-460-07003-7.
- Smith, David; Williams, Gareth (1980). Fields of Praise: The Official History of The Welsh Rugby Union. Cardiff: University of Wales Press. ISBN 0-7083-0766-3.
- Thomas, Wayne (1979). A Century of Welsh Rugby Players. Ansells Ltd.
