= Malcolm Davies (rugby) =

Wales international rugby league & union footballer

Personal information
- Full name: Alban Malcolm Davies
- Born: 15 January 1926 Cwmfelin, Wales
- Died: 27 February 2011 (aged 85) Sully, Wales

Playing information
- Height: 6 ft 1 in (185 cm)

Rugby union
- Position: Wing
Club
Years	Team	Pld	T	G	FG	P
≤1948–≤48	Penarth RFC
≤1948–48	Maesteg RFC
1949–≥50	Cardiff Athletic RFC
1948–50	Cardiff RFC	8
≤1952–≥52	Maesteg RFC
	Total	8	0	0	0	0

Rugby league
- Position: Wing
Club
Years	Team	Pld	T	G	FG	P
≤1953–56	Leigh	84	79
1956–57	Bradford Northern	19	22
1957–58	Leeds	35	45
≥1958–≥59	Bradford Northern
	Total	138	146	0	0	0
Representative
Years	Team	Pld	T	G	FG	P
1953–59	Wales	2

Alban Malcolm Davies (15 January 1926 – 27 February 2011) was a Welsh rugby union, and a professional rugby league footballer who played in the 1940s and 1950s. He played club level rugby union (RU) for Penarth RFC, Maesteg RFC (two spells), Cardiff RFC and Cardiff Athletic RFC, as a Wing, and representative level rugby league (RL) for Wales, and at club level for Leigh, Bradford Northern (two spells), and Leeds, as a wing.

== Playing career ==
=== International honours ===
Malcolm Davies won 2 caps for Wales (RL) in 1953–1959 while at Leigh, and Bradford Northern.

=== Club career ===
At Cardiff, Malcolm Davies played alongside; Rex Willis, Cliff Morgan, and Dr Jack Matthews, and was later a member of Cardiff's former players' association. In the 1952–53 Northern Rugby Football League season he changed codes, and joined the rugby league side Leigh, he was on the verge of returning to Wales, when in 1956 he was sold to Bradford Northern for £750, a year later in 1957 he was sold to Leeds for £3,000 (based on increases in average earnings, this would be approximately £151,900 in 2013), he was later sold back to Bradford Northern for £1,000.

== Outside of rugby ==
Following his retirement from rugby, Malcolm Davies established a glass and china wholesalers on High Street, Barry. Following his retirement, he became involved with Sully Community Council and spent five years as its chairman.

== Genealogical information ==
Malcolm Davies' marriage to Barbara M. (née Harris) was registered during fourth ¼ 1949 in East Glamorgan district, they had two children; Allan M. (birth registered during fourth ¼ 1950 in East Glamorgan district), and Yvonne M. (birth registered during second ¼ 1955 in East Glamorgan district), two grandchildren, and two great-grandchildren. Malcolm Davies' funeral service was held at St. John's Baptist Church, Sully, on Monday 14 March 2011, followed by cremation at Coychurch Crematorium.
