= Barry Girling =

Wales international rugby union player

- Born: Barry Edward Girling; 1857 Bristol, England
- Died: 28 October 1905 (aged 47–48) Algeria

Rugby union career
- Position: Forward
Amateur team(s)
Years	Team	Apps	(Points)
1876–1882	Cardiff RFC		
International career
Years	Team	Apps	(Points)
1881	Wales	1	(0)

Barry Edward Girling (1857 – 28 October 1905) was an English-born international rugby union forward who played club rugby for Cardiff and international rugby for Wales. He won a single cap for Wales, in the country's first international match.

== Rugby career ==
When Girling was selected for the first Welsh team he was playing for club team Cardiff. The team selection for the Wales squad was undertaken in a hurry, as the match organiser, Richard Mullock, had broken away from the South Wales Football Union to arrange the match with England. With no real links to any of the clubs outside Newport and Cardiff, Mullock chose a team made up of gentlemen players with connections to the old universities. Four members of Cardiff RFC were chosen for the Welsh team, club captain William David Phillips, vice-captain B. B. Mann, Leonard Watkins and Girling. The Welsh team were unprepared for the far more experienced and well drilled England team, and ended the match losing by eight goals to nil, a humiliating result. When the second Welsh international was arranged against Ireland the next year, eleven of the original squad were not reselected. Girling was one of those dropped, and never represented Wales again.

Although no longer part of the international scene, Girling continued playing for Cardiff, and when Phillips ended his captaincy of Cardiff, Girling was given the role for the 1882/83 season.

== Bibliography ==
- Smith, David; Williams, Gareth (1980). Fields of Praise: The Official History of The Welsh Rugby Union. Cardiff: University of Wales Press. ISBN 0-7083-0766-3.

Sporting positions
Preceded by William David Phillips	Cardiff RFC Captain; 1881–82	Succeeded by William David Phillips
