= Ewan Davies =

Welsh international rugby union (1887–1979)

- Born: David Evans George Davies; 23 June 1887 Cardiff, Wales
- Died: 2 September 1979 (aged 92) Cardiff, Wales
- Weight: 227 lb (103 kg)
- School: Cardiff High School; Llandovery College
- University: University College London
- Occupation(s): solicitor cinema chain owner

Rugby union career
- Position: wing
Amateur team(s)
Years	Team	Apps	(Points)
- Llandovery College
1910-1913	Cardiff RFC		
–	London Welsh RFC		
–	Middlesex		
International career
Years	Team	Apps	(Points)
1912	Wales	2	(6)

David Evans George "Ewan" Davies (23 June 1887 – 2 September 1979) was a Welsh international rugby union wing who won two caps for the Wales national rugby union team. He played club rugby for Cardiff RFC and London Welsh RFC and county rugby for Middlesex. Outside rugby he was a solicitor and successful businessman and owned a chain of cinemas.

== Personal history ==
Davies was born in Cardiff in 1887 and was educated at Cardiff High School and then Llandovery College before matriculating to University College London. He studied law, becoming a solicitor, but was also a successful businessman owning a chain of cinemas. In 1931 he built the Plaza Cinema in Swansea, at the time the largest cinema in Wales.

Davies held political ambitions, and twice ran as a Liberal candidate in British general elections. His first challenge was for Cardiff South in 1924 and then Llandaff and Barry in 1929, though he was unsuccessful on both occasions. He was also a landowner in Pembrokeshire, where he bred Hereford cattle.

== Rugby career ==
Davies played rugby through his youth, representing Cardiff High School and Llandovery. He continued playing while at university, and while in London he also turned out for Welsh exiles, London Welsh RFC. He joined first class Welsh team Cardiff RFC during the 1910-11 season and remained with the club for three seasons playing 37 games. While at Cardiff he was utilised as a wing and scored 27 tries.

Davies was first selected for the Wales national rugby union team during the 1912 Five Nations Championship. He was brought in at wing facing England at Twickenham. Wales lost the match 8-0, and Davies was not selected for the next two games of the tournament, a win over Scotland and an away loss to Ireland. He was reselected for the last match of the Championship, a home match against France played at Rodney Parade in Newport. Despite being 6-8 down at half-time, the Welsh rallied in the second half winning the game 14-8. Wales scored four tries, Davies scoring two of them. This was to be his last international appearance.

== Bibliography ==
- Davies, D.E. (1975). Cardiff Rugby Club, History and Statistics 1876-1975. Risca: The Starling Press. ISBN 0-9504421-0-0.
