= Kingsley Jones (rugby union, born 1935) =

Wales international rugby union footballer

- Born: Kingsley Daniel Jones; 5 August 1935 Pontypridd, Wales
- Died: 26 January 2003 (aged 67) Pontyclun, Wales
- University: Llandovery College

Rugby union career
- Position: Prop
Amateur team(s)
Years	Team	Apps	(Points)
- Llandovery College
–	Cardiff RFC		
–	Barbarian F.C.		
International career
Years	Team	Apps	(Points)
1960–1963	Wales	14	(0)

Kingsley Daniel Jones (5 August 1935 – 26 January 2003) was a Wales international rugby union player.

Jones played club rugby for Llandovery College and Cardiff RFC. He made his debut for Wales on 3 December 1960 versus South Africa and was selected for the 1962 British Lions tour to South Africa. His contemporaries on the Cardiff team included fellow prop Howard Norris.
