= B. B. Mann =

Wales international rugby union player

- Born: Bathurst Bellers Mann; 15 May 1858 Ireland
- Died: 17 November 1948 (aged 90) Los Angeles, United States

Rugby union career
- Position: Forward
Amateur team(s)
Years	Team	Apps	(Points)
- Cardiff RFC
International career
Years	Team	Apps	(Points)
1881	Wales	1	(0)

Bathurst Bellers Mann (15 May 1858 – 17 November 1948) was an Irish-born international rugby union forward who played club rugby for Cardiff and international rugby for Wales. He won a single cap for Wales, in the country's first international match.

== Rugby career ==
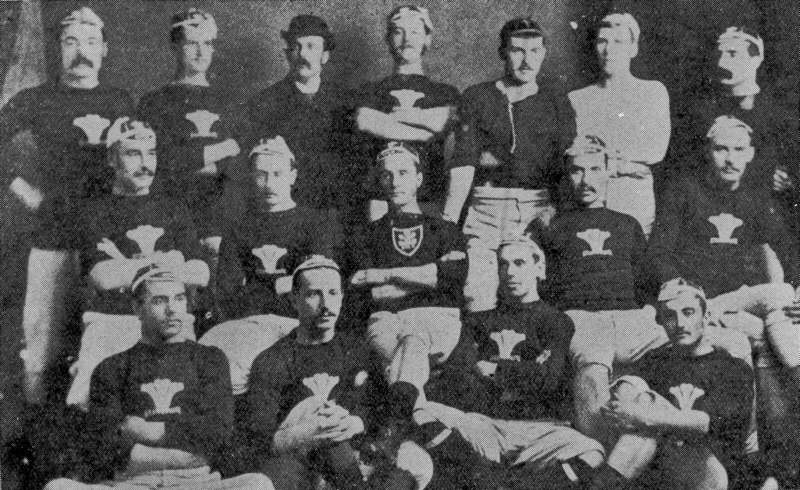
The first Welsh team, Mann is sat in the middle row, far right, February 1881

In 1881 Newport Athletic secretary Richard Mullock needed to quickly form a Welsh team to face England after a successful application to the Rugby Football Union. He turned to two of Wales' main rugby clubs, Newport and Cardiff, to form the bulk of the team. Mann was vice-captain of Cardiff RFC during the 1880/81 season and was one of four players that represented Cardiff during the period to make up the first Wales team; the other three members were Leonard Watkins, Barry Girling and William David Phillips.

The Welsh team was poorly organised before the game began, with no trial games organised, and a group of players who had very little experience of each other's style of play. Many members of the team were picked on their college background or the geographic location of their club. The game began poorly when Mann and Lewis were both injured after just ten minutes of the match and eventually had to leave the field. The game ended in humiliation for the Welsh team, with England winning by eight goals to nil. Eleven players were dropped from the next Wales game, Mann being one of those to never play at an international level again.

Mann later emigrated to the United States and he died in Los Angeles in 1948. He is buried in Bellevue Cemetery, Ontario, California.

== Bibliography ==
- Smith, David; Williams, Gareth (1980). Fields of Praise: The Official History of The Welsh Rugby Union. Cardiff: University of Wales Press. ISBN 0-7083-0766-3.
