= 1955 Five Nations Championship =

Rugby union competition

- Date: 8 January – 26 March 1955
- Countries: England; Ireland; France; Scotland; Wales

Tournament statistics
- Champions: France and Wales
- Matches played: 10

The 1955 Five Nations Championship was the twenty-sixth series of the rugby union Five Nations Championship. Including the previous incarnations as the Home Nations and Five Nations, this was the sixty-first series of the northern hemisphere rugby union championship. Ten matches were played between 8 January and 26 March. It was contested by England, France, Ireland, Scotland and Wales.

France missed out on a maiden Grand Slam after losing to Wales at Stade Colombes.

== Participants ==
The teams involved were:

Team	Venue	City	Captain
England	Twickenham Stadium	London	Nim Hall/Peter Young
France	Stade Olympique Yves-du-Manoir	Colombes	Jean Prat
Ireland	Lansdowne Road	Dublin	Robin Thompson/Jim McCarthy
Scotland	Murrayfield Stadium	Edinburgh	Jim Greenwood/Angus Cameron
Wales	National Stadium	Cardiff	Bleddyn Williams/Rex Willis/Rees Stephens

== Table ==
Pos	Team	Pld	W	D	L	PF	PA	PD	Pts
1	Wales	4	3	0	1	48	28	+20	6
1	France	4	3	0	1	47	28	+19	6
3	Scotland	4	2	0	2	32	35	−3	4
4	England	4	1	1	2	24	31	−7	3
5	Ireland	4	0	1	3	15	44	−29	1

== Results ==
1955-01-08

France	15–0	Scotland

Paris

1955-01-22

Ireland	3–5	France

Dublin

1955-01-22

Wales	3–0	England

Cardiff

1955-02-05

Scotland	14–8	Wales

Edinburgh

1955-02-12

Ireland	6–6	England

Dublin

1955-02-26

England	9–16	France

London

1955-02-26

Scotland	12–3	Ireland

Edinburgh

1955-03-12

Wales	21–3	Ireland

Cardiff

1955-03-19

England	9–6	Scotland

London

1955-03-26

France	11–16	Wales

Paris
