= Leonard Watkins =

Wales international rugby union player

- Born: Leonard Watkins; 7 December 1859 Abergavenny, Wales
- Died: 7 February 1901 (aged 41) Chajarí, Argentina
- School: Sherborne School
- University: Exeter College, Oxford

Rugby union career
- Position: Half-back
Amateur team(s)
Years	Team	Apps	(Points)
- Oxford University RFC
- Llandaff RFC
1877-1881	Cardiff RFC		
International career
Years	Team	Apps	(Points)
1881	Wales	1	(0)

Leonard Watkins (7 December 1859 - 7 February 1901) was a Welsh international rugby union half-back who played club rugby for Cardiff Rugby Football Club and international rugby for Wales. He won just a single game for Wales when he was selected for the first Welsh rugby international.

== Rugby career ==
Watkins was born in Abergavenny and was educated at Exeter College, Oxford. While at Exeter College, he represented the Oxford University team, and in 1879 he was awarded a sporting Blue. After leaving Oxford, Watkins returned to Wales, moving to Cardiff. He represented two clubs while in the Welsh capital, premier club Cardiff RFC and local rivals Llandaff.

In 1881, Newport Athletic secretary and sporting entrepreneur Richard Mullock, organised a fixture between the England rugby union team and a Welsh XV. At the time Wales did not have an international team, and after the challenge was accepted by the Rugby Football Union, Mullock needed to select a team quickly. Watkins was one of four players who represented Cardiff to be selected for the team, alongside B. B. Mann, Barry Girling and William David Phillips. The Welsh team that arrived to play England at Blackheath were completely unprepared for the game; there had been no trial and most of the team were unfamiliar with each other's style of play. The game was a one-sided affair, with England humiliating Wales in an 8-goal victory. Watkins never represented his country again, emigrating to Argentina later that year.

=== International matches played ===
Wales

- England 1881

== Bibliography ==
- Jenkins, Vivian (1981). Rothmans Rugby Yearbook 1981-82. Aylesbury: Rothmans Publications Ltd. ISBN 0-907574-05-X.
- Smith, David; Williams, Gareth (1980). Fields of Praise: The Official History of The Welsh Rugby Union. Cardiff: University of Wales Press. ISBN 0-7083-0766-3.
