= 1995 Fiji rugby union tour of Wales and Ireland =

Summary
P	W	D	L
Total
9	3	0	6
Test match
2	0	0	2
Opponent
P	W	D	L
Wales
1	0	0	0
Ireland
1	0	0	0

The 1995 Fiji rugby union tour of Wales and Ireland was a series of matches played in October and November 1995 in Wales and Ireland by the Fiji national rugby union team.

== Results ==
Scores and results list Fiji's points tally first.

Opposing Team	For	Against	Date	Venue	Status
Wales A	25	10	21 October 1995	Brewery Field, Bridgend	Tour match
Neath RFC	22	30	25 October 1995	The Gnoll, Neath	Tour match
Cardiff	21	22	28 October 1995	Arms Park, Cardiff	Tour match
Treorchy	70	14	1 November 1995	The Oval, Treorchy	Tour match
Pontypridd	13	31	4 November 1995	Sardis Road, Pontypridd	Tour match
Llanelli RFC	32	18	7 November 1995	Stradey Park, Llanelli	Tour match
Wales	15	19	11 November 1995	Arms Park, Cardiff	Test match
Connacht	5	27	14 November 1995	Sportsgrounds, Galway	Tour match
Ireland	8	44	18 November 1995	Lansdowne Road, Dublin	Test match
