= Llandovery College =

Private school in Carmarthenshire, Wales

Llandovery College Welsh: Coleg Llanymddyfri

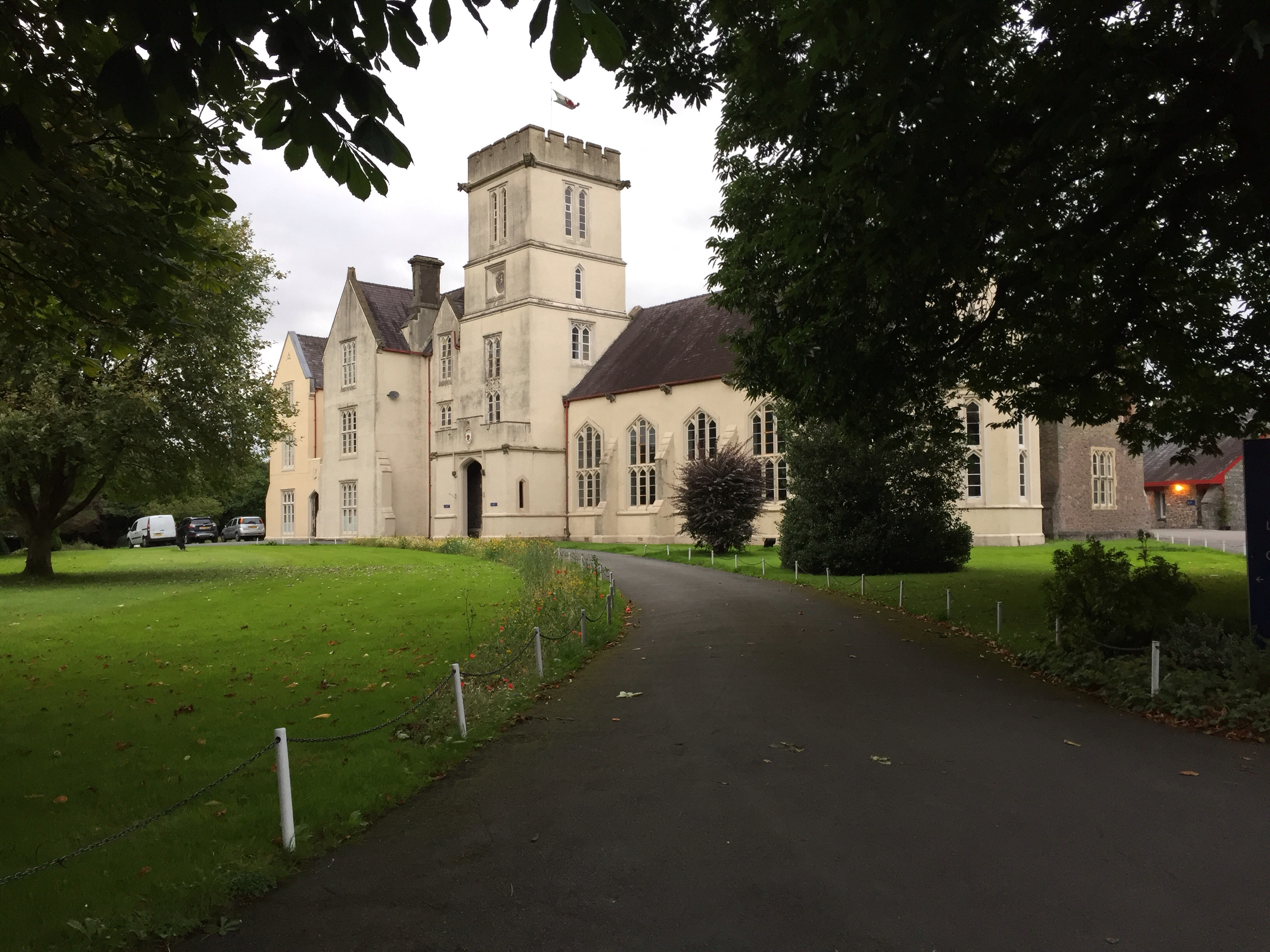

Location
- Queensway; Llandovery, Carmarthenshire, SA20 0EE; Wales

Information
- Other names: Welsh College, Llandovery; Collegiate Institute; The Eton of Wales
- Type: Private day and boarding
- Motto: Gwell Dysg Na Golud ([There are] no riches better than learning)
- Religious affiliation: Anglican
- Established: 1848; 178 years ago
- Founder: Thomas Phillips
- Local authority: Carmarthenshire
- Department for Education URN: 401992 Tables
- Warden: Dominic Findlay
- Gender: Coeducational
- Age: 4 to 18
- Enrolment: 340~
- Former pupils: Old Llandoverians
- Website: www.llandoverycollege.com

Llandovery College (Welsh: Coleg Llanymddyfri) is a coeducational private boarding and day school in Llandovery, Carmarthenshire, Wales. The college consists of Gollop Preparatory, Senior School and Sixth Form. It was previously known as "Welsh College, Llandovery" and "Collegiate Institute" at various periods of its history.

== History ==
Llandovery College was founded by Thomas Phillips in 1847, a surgeon and later, plantation owner. After the passing of the Slavery Abolition Act 1833 he was compensated £4,737 8s 6d in 1836 for the release of 167 slaves, of which he used £4,600 to build Llandovery College. He wanted the school to offer a classical and liberal education in which the Welsh language, the study of Welsh literature and history, were to be cultivated. The town of Llandovery was decided upon "because of its central position and because of easy communication with all parts of South Wales". Also important was "the great beauty and healthiness of the locality and the absence of manufacturing industries". The school first opened with a handful of boys on St David's Day 1848. On 13 December 1849, the foundation stone of the present building was laid.

Between 1901 and 1903, alterations were made to the existing school, and new buildings were added, by the Lancaster architects Austin and Paley. The additional buildings included the east range, a school house, and a dining room, at a cost of about £10,000. During his visit in 1902, Sir James Williams-Drummond, 4th Baronet dubbed the school "The Eton of Wales."

They have named their newest building the 'Thomas Phillips Centre' after their founder.

The first girls were admitted during the late 1960s. Gollop Preparatory School, the prep department which was named after the Chairman of Governors Ian Gollop, was opened to pupils aged 7–11 in 2001. A nursery was added and the intake was extended to age 4 for the 2012–13 school year.

Between 2014 and 2015, they paid out 'tens of thousands of pounds' in compensation to former employees.

== Architecture ==
The school building is designated by Cadw as a Grade II listed building.

== Curriculum ==
All pupils in the preparatory school and up to Year 9 are required to learn Welsh.

On St David's Day 2011, the college opened Wales' first Confucius classroom to facilitate the teaching of Mandarin Chinese, with Prince Charles and Chinese Ambassador to the UK Liu Xiaoming both in attendance.

== Extracurricular activities ==
Sports available include rugby football, association football (soccer), cricket, hockey, netball and athletics.

== Facilities ==
The college is equipped with over 45 acres (18 ha) of playing fields, an all-weather pitch, climbing wall, gym and weights room and a 9-hole golf course.

== Links with rugby union ==
Llandovery College has connections with the early adoption of rugby into Wales. Although St David's College, Lampeter is accepted as the first establishment to play rugby, Llandovery was one of their first opponents, were present at the formation of the Welsh Rugby Union in Neath in 1881 and provided two players to the very first international game Wales played. The second captain of the Welsh national team, Charles Lewis, represented Llandovery College and was the first Wales captain to lead a team in the Home Nations Championship.

== Notable former pupils and staff ==
=== Former staff members ===
- Stephen Gorard, education researcher, taught in the early 1990s
- Owen Phillips, college warden (1854–61) and third Dean of St David's
- Samuel Ogden Andrew, classics master (1892–95) and translator of Homer

=== Old Llandoverians ===
Ex pupils are known as Old Llandoverians and belong to the Old Llandoverian Society.

- Huw Ceredig, actor who played Reg Harries in the soap opera Pobol y Cwm
- A. G. Edwards, Archbishop of Wales
- Deian Hopkin, historian
- Dill Jones, jazz pianist
- Ernest Jones, Welsh neurologist, psychoanalyst and official biographer of Sigmund Freud
- Glyn Mathias, political editor of Independent Television News (1981–1986) and BBC Wales (1994–1999), the Electoral Commission's Commissioner for Wales (2001–2008) and a board member of OFCOM (2011–present)
- Llywarch Reynolds, Welsh solicitor and Celtic scholar
- Mervyn Johns, Welsh film and television character actor
- Rod Richards, Conservative Party politician
- Rhydian Roberts, The X Factor contestant
- Robert Jermain Thomas, Christian missionary
- Peter Warren, archaeologist and academic specialising in the Aegean Bronze Age
- Gwilym Owen Williams, Bishop of Bangor
- W. Llewelyn Williams, Liberal Party politician

==== Rugby players ====
- Ewan Davies
- Geoff Evans, British Lion
- Vivian Jenkins, British Lion
- Alun Wyn Jones, British Lion
- Cliff Jones, Wales captain
- Gwyn Jones, Wales captain
- Kingsley Daniel Jones, British Lion
- Rhodri Jones
- Sacha Feinberg-Mngomezulu, South Africa International
- Charles Lewis, the second Wales international rugby union captain 1882–83
- Edward John Lewis, first Wales international
- George North British Lion
- Andy Powell
- Craig Quinnell
- Harry Randall England International
- Arthur Rees
- Peter Rogers
- Rees Stephens, Wales captain and British Lion

== See also ==
- List of non-ecclesiastical works by Austin and Paley (1895–1914)
