= Ivor Williams (rugby union) =

British Lions international rugby union player (1912-1983)

- Born: 1 July 1912
- Died: 1 July 1983 (aged 71)

Rugby union career
- Position: Back row
International career
Years	Team	Apps	(Points)
1938	British Lions		

Ivor Williams (1 July 1912 – 1 July 1983) was a Welsh international rugby union player.

Originally a footballer, Williams had three seasons as a goal-keeper with the Cardiff City FC reserves side, before switching to Cardiff RFC and later playing for Gloucester RFC.

Williams, uncapped for Wales, was a back row forward and toured South Africa as a British Lion in 1938. He scored a try in his first match against Griqualand West, then was briefly sidelined when he was injured on a visit to Cango Caves, but returned to finish the tour with seven appearances, although he was overlooked for the Test matches.

== See also ==
- List of British & Irish Lions players
