= 1979 Canada rugby union tour of England, Wales and France =

Tour of England

Summary
P	W	D	L
Total
6	3	1	2
Test match
1	0	0	1
Opponent
P	W	D	L
France
1	0	0	1

The 1979 Canada rugby union tour of England, Wales and France was a series of six matches played by the Canada national rugby union team in England, Wales and France in September 1979. The Canadian team won three of their tour matches, drew one and lost the other two. The team designated France 'A' was effectively the France national rugby union team.

== Matches ==
Scores and results list Canada's points tally first.

Opposing Team	Result	For	Against	Date	Venue
Somerset	Won	15	6	September 12	Recreation Ground, Bath
Cornwall	Won	10	6	September 26	Recreation Ground, Redruth
Cardiff	Lost	8	19	September 19	Cardiff Arms Park, Cardiff
Southern Counties	Drew	6	6	September 22	Aylesbury RFC, Weston Turville
France 'B'	Won	14	4	September 26	Lille
France 'A'	Lost	15	34	September 29	Stade Sébastien Charléty, Paris

== Touring party ==
- Manager: P. C. Clarke
- Assistant manager: B. L. Howe
- Captain: Mike Luke

=== Backs ===
- Anthony Bauer
- Andrew Bibby
- Robbie Greig
- Garry Hirayama
- Spence McTavish
- Dennis Quigley
- Chuck Shergold
- Patrick Trelawney
- Preston Wiley
- Keith Wilkinson
- William Taylor
- E. A Zinkan

=== Forwards ===
- Don Carson
- Hans de Goede
- Jim Donaldson
- Christoper Fowler
- Gary Grant
- Ro Hindson
- Mike Luke
- Ron McInnes
- Kenneth Peace
- Raymond Rogers
- Robin Russell
- Dave Sinnott
- Dwaine Van Eeuwen
