= Lloyd Williams (rugby union, born 1933) =

Wales international rugby union player (1933–2017)

- Born: Lloyd Hugh Williams; 19 October 1933 Taff's Well, Rhondda Cynon Taf, Wales
- Died: 25 February 2017 (aged 83)
- School: Taff's Well School; Caerphilly Secondary School

Rugby union career
- Position: Scrum-half
Amateur team(s)
Years	Team	Apps	(Points)
- Cardiff RFC
–	Royal Air Force		
–	Barbarian F.C.		
International career
Years	Team	Apps	(Points)
1957–1962	Wales	13	(0)

Lloyd Hugh Williams (19 October 1933 – 25 February 2017) was a Welsh international rugby union player. He captained the Wales national rugby union team on three occasions in 1961–62. Williams played his club rugby for Cardiff RFC and was the younger brother of another Welsh international rugby union player and captain, Bleddyn Williams. Lloyd Williams died in February 2017 aged 83.
