= Arthur Rees =

Wales international rugby union footballer & Chief Constable

- Born: Arthur Morgan Rees; 20 November 1912 Llangadog, Carmarthenshire, Wales
- Died: 13 May 1998 (aged 85) Oxshott, Surrey, England
- Height: 1.87 m (6 ft 2 in)
- Weight: 85.5 kg (13 st 6 lb)
- School: Llandovery College
- University: St Catharine's College, Cambridge
- Occupation: Police chief

Rugby union career
- Position: Flanker
Amateur team(s)
Years	Team	Apps	(Points)
- Cambridge University
–	Royal Air Force		
–	Metropolitan Police		
–	London Welsh RFC		
–	Stoke		
–	Wrexham RFC		
–	Barbarian F.C.		
–	Sussex		
–	Middlesex		
International career
Years	Team	Apps	(Points)
1934–1938	Wales	13	(0)

Arthur Morgan Rees CBE, QPM, DL (20 November 1912 – 13 May 1998) was a Welsh international rugby union flanker, the Chief Constable of Denbighshire and later of Stafford and Stoke-on-Trent, a sports' administrator and World War II fighter pilot.

== Biography ==
Rees was born in the village of Llangadog in 1912. He was raised as a Welsh speaker, not learning English until the age of seven. He was educated at Llandovery College before matriculating to St Catharine's College, Cambridge, earning two rugby blues. He joined the Metropolitan Police after leaving Cambridge in 1935, joining the Royal Air Force after the outbreak of the Second World War. Serving as a pilot, he rose to the rank of squadron leader, ending as acting wing commander.

Rees was capped for Wales 13 times, most notably as pack leader in 1935 when they beat the All Blacks 13-12. It was described by journalist JBG Thomas as, "The most exciting international match ever played in Wales."

In 1943 he married Dorothy Webb, with whom he would have a daughter, Rosemary. With the end of the war, he returned to the Metropolitan force, rising through the ranks until becoming the Chief Constable of Denbighshire Constabulary in 1957. He remained with the Welsh force until 1964, when he became the Chief Constable of Staffordshire Police.

== Awards ==
Rees received several awards for his many years as a high ranking police officer and his work on sporting bodies. In 1960 he was appointed Officer of the Order of the British Empire, which was followed by Commander of the Order of the British Empire in the 1974 Birthday Honours. He was awarded the Queen's Police Medal in 1970 and was made a Deputy Lieutenant to Staffordshire in 1967. In May 1977 he was granted the Freedom of the City of London and in November of the same year was made a Knight of the Order of St John.

== Bibliography ==
- Billot, John (1972). All Blacks in Wales. Ferndale: Ron Jones Publications.
- Godwin, Terry (1984). The International Rugby Championship 1883-1983. London: Willows Books. ISBN 0-00-218060-X.
- Smith, David; Williams, Gareth (1980). Fields of Praise: The Official History of The Welsh Rugby Union. Cardiff: University of Wales Press. ISBN 0-7083-0766-3.
- Thomas, Wayne (1979). A Century of Welsh Rugby Players. Ansells Ltd.
