= Howard Poole =

British Lions & Wales international rugby union footballer

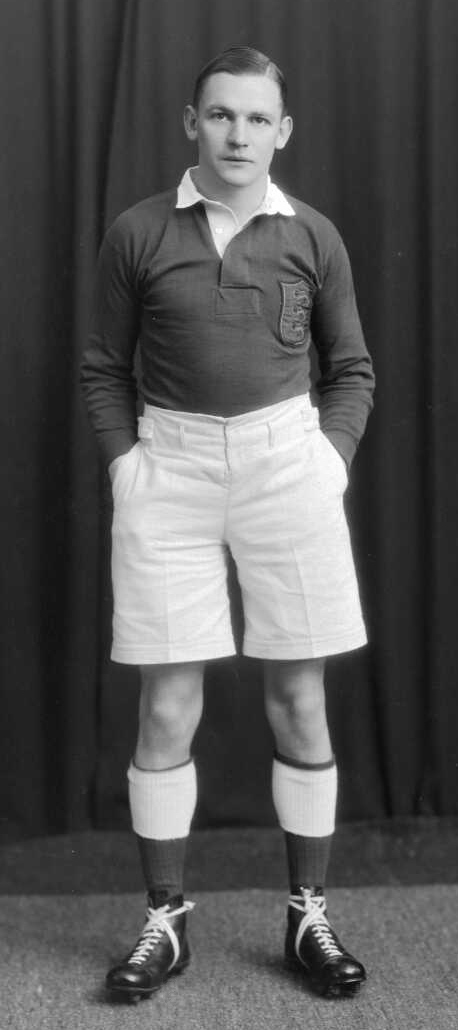
- Poole in New Zealand in 1930
- Born: Howard Nelson Poole; 15 January 1905 Cardiff, Wales
- Died: 20 January 1966 (aged 61) Whitchurch, Wales

Rugby union career
- Position: Scrum-half
Amateur team(s)
Years	Team	Apps	(Points)
1922–1932	Cardiff RFC		
International career
Years	Team	Apps	(Points)
1930	British Lions	1	(0)

Howard Poole (15 August 1905 – 20 January 1966) was a Welsh international rugby union scrum-half who played club rugby for Cardiff. Although never playing for Wales he was selected to play in the 1930 British Lions tour of New Zealand and Australia.

== International matches played ==
British Lions

- New Zealand 1930

== Bibliography ==
- Billot, John (1972). All Blacks in Wales. Ferndale, Glamorgan: Ron Jones Publications.
- Godwin, Terry (1984). The International Rugby Championship 1883-1983. Grafton Street, London: Willow Books. ISBN 0-00-218060-X.
