= Arthur Cornish =

Wales international rugby union player

- Born: Robert Arthur Cornish; 30 June 1897 Cardiff, Wales
- Died: 29 July 1948 (aged 51) Cardiff, Wales
- School: Grangetown Council School; Canton High School
- University: University College, Cardiff
- Occupation: School teacher

Rugby union career
- Position: Centre
Amateur team(s)
Years	Team	Apps	(Points)
- Cardiff RFC
–	Royal Navy		
International career
Years	Team	Apps	(Points)
1923–1926	Wales	10	(7)

Robert Arthur Cornish (30 June 1897 – 29 July 1948) was a Wales international rugby union player. He captained the Wales national rugby union team on two occasion in 1925–26. Cornish played his club rugby for Cardiff RFC. After retiring from International and club rugby, Arthur was a line judge and was Chairman of the Wales Selectors and remained involved in Cardiff Rugby Club. He had been appointed Head Teacher of Ninian Park Junior school in Grangetown, not long before his death from a heart attack in July 1948. Cornish Close, in Cardiff's Grangetown (where Arthur and his family were from), is named for Arthur and his four brothers, who were known locally for their contribution to rugby, baseball and cricket within the city.
