= Llywarch Reynolds =

British lawyer and scholar (1843–1916)

Llywarch Owain Reynolds (1843 – 12 March 1916) was a Welsh solicitor and Celtic scholar, who collected a large number of manuscripts that are now held by the National Library of Wales.

== Life ==
Reynolds was the son of Jonathan Owain Reynolds, an author and translator. He was born in 1843 and educated at Llandovery College before being articled to solicitors in Merthyr Tydfil, south Wales. In 1868, Reynolds matriculated at Jesus College, Oxford, obtaining a Bachelor of Arts degree in 1875. He returned to work as a solicitor in Merthyr, later setting up his firm and becoming clerk to Rhymney District Council. He collected various books and manuscripts, 28 volumes of which were bequeathed to the National Library of Wales on his death, including Llyuyr Hir Llywarch Reynolds, a collection of Welsh poems from the seventeenth century. Reynolds was a friend of the Welsh scholar and academic Sir John Rhys and helped in 1893 to publish the essay written by Thomas Stephens that disproved the claim that Prince Madoc had discovered America. Reynolds died on 12 March 1916 in Brislington, Bristol.
