= William David Phillips =

Wales international rugby union footballer

William Phillips
- Born: William David Phillips; 16 August 1855 Cardiff, Wales
- Died: 15 October 1918 (aged 63) Cardiff, Wales
- School: Bridgend School
- Occupation: accountant

Rugby union career
- Position: Forward
Amateur team(s)
Years	Team	Apps	(Points)
1876-1895	Cardiff RFC	109	
International career
Years	Team	Apps	(Points)
1881-1884	Wales	5	(0)

William David Phillips (16 August 1855 – 15 October 1918) was a Welsh international rugby union forward who played club rugby for Cardiff Rugby Football Club and international rugby for Wales. He won five caps for Wales and would later become a central figure in the early history of the Welsh Rugby Union.

== Rugby career ==
Phillips came to note as a rugby player while playing for first class club Cardiff and in the 1879/80 season he was elected as club captain for the first team. Phillips would keep the captaincy for three seasons in total, the first player to regain the captaincy in the club's history. In 1881, Phillips was selected to play for the first representative Welsh international team, in a game against England. Phillips was one of four Cardiff players in the first match, along with B. B. Mann, Barry Girling and Leonard Watkins. The Welsh team were humiliated when the English scored 13 tries without reply, and the press attacked the Welsh Union secretary Richard Mullock for choosing a "private" team of friends and elitists rather than the best players available. Phillips himself was a strong supporter of Mulloch, and when Mulloch was challenged in his position as secretary, it was Phillips, along with Horace Lyne, who voiced their opinion strongest in his support.

Despite the heavy defeat, Phillips was re-selected to play for Wales in the next game against Ireland, one of only four players to hold their place. Under the captaincy of Charles Lewis, Wales beat the Irish by two goals and two tries to nil. Despite the win, Phillips would miss the next two Wales games, but was back in the squad for all three of the matches in the 1884 Home Nations Championship. Wales lost two and won one of the games, the victory was again against Ireland and was Phillips last international game.

Phillips continued his close connection with Welsh rugby, when in 1887 he was chosen to referee the Home Nations match between Ireland and England. His second and final international match he would officiate was the 1889 Championship game between Ireland and Scotland in Belfast. In 1892, after his international career had come to an end; Phillips was chosen as one of four vice-presidents of the WRU, representing the East Wales region along with Horace Lyne. From 1887 until 1907, Phillips was one of the Welsh representatives on the International Rugby Board.

=== International matches played ===
Wales

- England 1881, 1884
- Ireland 1882, 1884
- Scotland 1884

== Bibliography ==
- Smith, David; Williams, Gareth (1980). Fields of Praise: The Official History of The Welsh Rugby Union. Cardiff: University of Wales Press. ISBN 0-7083-0766-3.
- Jenkins, John M.; et al. (1991). Who's Who of Welsh International Rugby Players. Wrexham: Bridge Books. ISBN 1-872424-10-4.

Sporting positions
Preceded by R. H. Fox	Cardiff RFC captain 1879–1881	Succeeded by Barry Girling
Preceded by Barry Girling	Cardiff RFC captain 1882–1883	Succeeded by H. J. Simpson
