= 1996 Western Samoa rugby union tour of Great Britain and Ireland =

Summary
| P | W | D | L |
Total
| 10 | 9 | 0 | 1 |
Test match
| 1 | 1 | 0 | 0 |
Opponent
| P | W | D | L |
Ireland
| 1 | 1 | 0 | 0 |

The 1996 Samoa rugby union tour of Great Britain and Ireland was a series of matches played in November and December 1996 in British Isles by Samoa national rugby union team.

== Results ==
Scores and results list Samoa's points tally first.

| Opponent | For | Against | Date | Venue | Status |
|---|---|---|---|---|---|
| Saracens FC | 40 | 53 | 1 November 1996 | Goldsdown, Enfield | Tour match |
| Oxford University | 58 | 27 | 5 November 1996 | Oxford | Tour match |
| Munster | 35 | 25 | 9 November 1996 | Musgrave Park, Cork | Tour match |
| Ireland | 40 | 25 | 12 November 1996 | Lansdowne Road, Dublin | Test match |
| Cambridge University | 14 | 13 | November 1996 | Cambridge | Tour match |
| Llanelli RFC | 15 | 23 | 23 November 1996 | Llanelli, Llanelli | Tour match |
| Cardiff | 53 | 29 | 26 November 1996 | Arms Park, Cardiff | Tour match |
| Newbury R.F.C. | 35 | 21 | 29 November 1996 | Newbury, Berkshire | Tour match |
| Bath | 36 | 17 | 2 December 1996 | Bath | Tour match |
| Leicester/Northampton | 33 | 20 | 6 December 1996 | Welford Road, Leicester | Tour match |
| Richmond | 32 | 12 | 10 December 1996 | London | Tour match |
