= Billy Cleaver =

British Lions & Wales international rugby union footballer

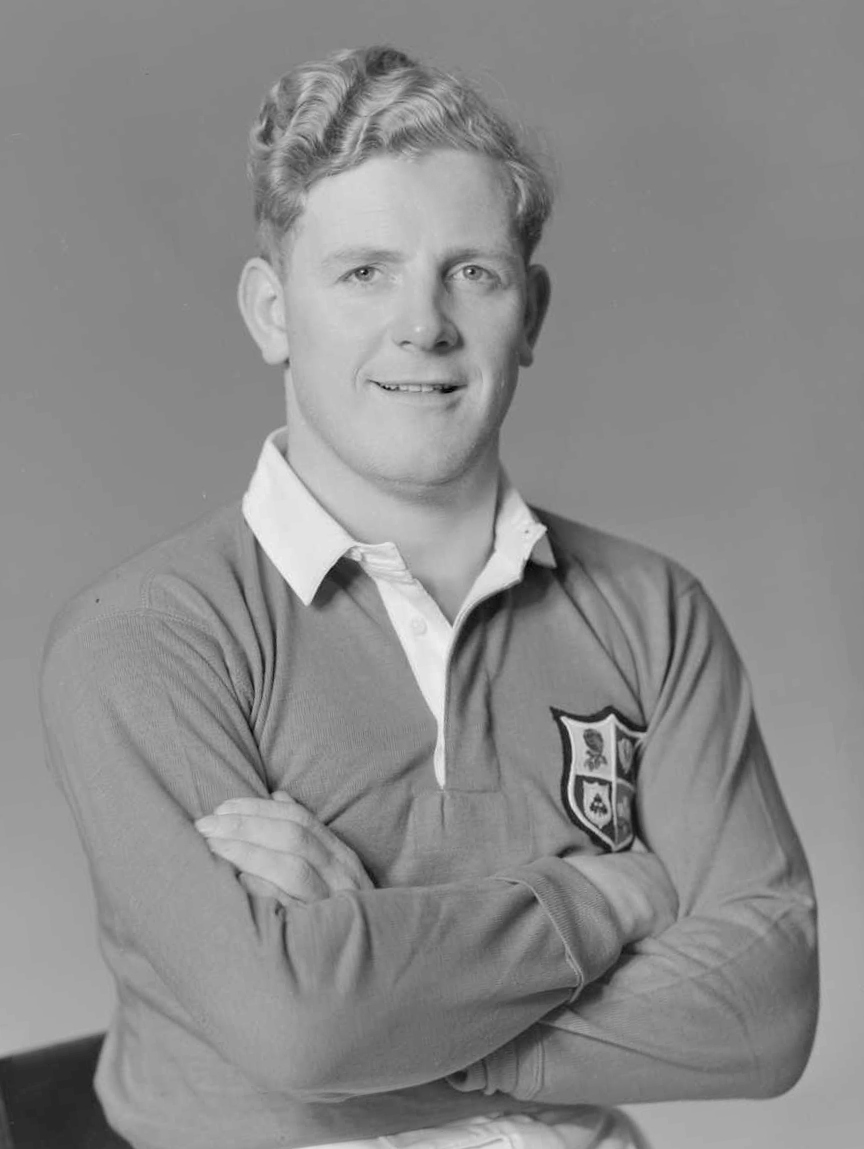
- Cleaver in New Zealand in 1950
- Born: William Benjamin Cleaver; 15 September 1921 Treorchy, Wales
- Died: 29 September 2003 (aged 82) Cardiff, Wales
- Height: 5 ft 9 in (1.75 m)
- Weight: 13 st (180 lb; 83 kg)
- School: Pentre School
- University: University College of Wales, Cardiff
- Occupation: mining engineer

Rugby union career
- Position: Fly-half
Amateur team(s)
Years	Team	Apps	(Points)
- Treorchy RFC
- Newbridge RFC
- Bridgend RFC
1945-1951	Cardiff RFC		
1946-1947	Barbarian F.C.		
International career
Years	Team	Apps	(Points)
1947-1950	Wales	14	(6)
1950	British Lions	3	(0)

William Cleaver (15 September 1921 – 29 September 2003) was a Welsh international Rugby Union fly-half who played club rugby for Cardiff. He won 14 caps for Wales and was selected to play for the British Lions on the 1950 tour of Australia and New Zealand. He was in the Welsh team that won the 1950 Grand Slam.

Born in 1921 in Treorchy, Rhondda, Cleaver was an exciting attacking player with a shrewd change of pace. After one terrible game, under heavy weather conditions against Scotland, Cleaver gained the nickname 'Billy Kick'; though this was a harsh moniker considering his normal style of play. Cleaver was a coal miner by trade and spent most of his life within the industry, though in a managerial role for much of his later career. He was a keen patron of the arts: he was secretary of the Contemporary Arts Society for Wales (1972–91) and vice chairman of the Welsh Arts Council (1980–83).

== International career ==
Cleaver was first selected for Wales during the 1947 Five Nations Championship, the first official game for the Welsh team after World War II. His first game was against England at the Cardiff Arms Park and he lined up alongside fellow Cardiff players Matthews, Williams, Evans and captain Haydn Tanner. Unsurprisingly, both Wales and their first opponents, England, were heavy with new caps, and although Wales lost, Cleaver played in all four games during the tournament. He scored his first try for Wales in the 1947 game against Scotland, a match which Wales won 22–8. In the 1950 campaign, in which Wales won the Grand Slam, Cleaver played in all four games, and scored a drop goal against Scotland.

=== International matches played ===
Wales

- Australia 1947
- England 1947, 1948, 1950
- France 1947, 1948, 1950
- Ireland 1947, 1948, 1949, 1950
- Scotland 1947, 1948, 1950

=== British Lions ===
During the 1950 Lions tour, Cleaver played ten provincial matches and in three test games against the All Blacks. For some unknown reason Cleaver was chosen as one of the two full-backs on the tour, this was not his normal position. The other full back, Norton of Ireland, broke his arm early on and Cleaver was forced to play in every match in that position until Lewis Jones arrived as Norton's replacement. Cleaver never played a game on the tour as fly-half, but did play in three of the test matches against New Zealand showing good quality play opposite the All Blacks' Bob Scott. On the return trip the team stopped to play the national team of Ceylon, and Cleaver took his part as one of the two touch judges.

- New Zealand 1950, 1950, 1950

== Bibliography ==
- Smith, David; Williams, Gareth (1980). Fields of Praise: The Official History of The Welsh Rugby Union. Cardiff: University of Wales Press. ISBN 0-7083-0766-3.
