= Howard Norris =

British Lions & Wales international rugby union footballer

- Born: Charles Howard Norris; 11 June 1934 Porth, Wales
- Died: 30 January 2015 (aged 80) Cardiff, Wales
- School: Porth Secondary
- University: St Luke's College, Exeter
- Occupation: Schoolmaster

Rugby union career
- Position: Prop
Amateur team(s)
Years	Team	Apps	(Points)
- Tylorstown RFC
–	Cardiff RFC		
–	Barbarian F.C.		
International career
Years	Team	Apps	(Points)
1963–1966	Wales	2	(0)
1966	British Lions	3	(0)

Charles Howard Norris (11 June 1934 – 30 January 2015) was a Wales international rugby union player.

He was capped twice by Wales as a prop, both times against France, once in 1963 and once in 1966.

He was selected for the 1966 British Lions tour to Australia and New Zealand, and played in the first three tests against the All Blacks, giving him the distinction of earning more caps for the Lions than he did for his country.

Norris played club rugby for Tylorstown and Cardiff, making a record 415 appearances for Cardiff. He was born in Porth and died in Cardiff on 30 January 2015.
