= Bleddyn Williams =

British Lions & Wales international rugby union player (1923–2009)

Bleddyn Williams MBE
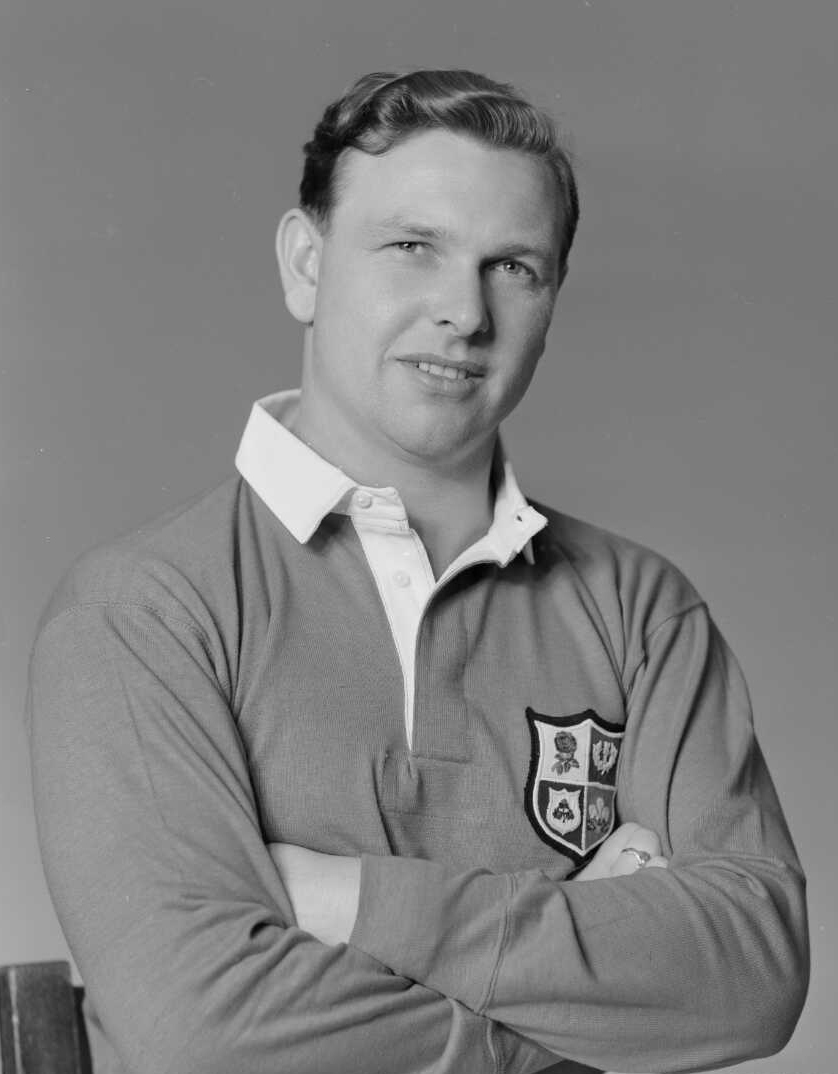
- Williams in New Zealand in 1950
- Born: Bleddyn Llewellyn Williams; 22 February 1923 Taff's Well, Rhondda Cynon Taf, Wales
- Died: 6 July 2009 (aged 86) Cardiff, Wales
- Height: 5 ft 10 in (1.78 m)
- Weight: 13 st (180 lb; 83 kg)
- School: Rydal School
- Occupation(s): Glider Pilot Regiment; Journalist

Rugby union career
- Position: Centre
Amateur team(s)
Years	Team	Apps	(Points)
–	Taffs Well RFC	283	
–	Cardiff RFC		
–	Newbridge RFC		
–	Barbarian F.C.		
International career
Years	Team	Apps	(Points)
1947–1955	Wales	22	(21)
1950	British Lions	5	(3)
- Military career
- Allegiance: United Kingdom
- Branch: Royal Air Force; British Army
- Unit: Glider Pilot Regiment
- Conflicts: World War II; Operation Varsity

Bleddyn Llewellyn Williams MBE (22 February 1923 – 6 July 2009), was a Welsh rugby union centre. He played in 22 internationals for Wales, captaining them five times, winning each time, and captained the British Lions in 1950 for some of their tour of Australia and New Zealand. Considered to be the nonpareil of Welsh centres; he was robust in the tackle and known for his strong leadership and surging runs; he was often referred to as 'The Prince Of Centres'.

== Early life ==
Born at Taff's Well, near Cardiff, he was the third of eight brothers Williams attended Rydal School in Colwyn Bay from the age of 14 until he was 18. He had already played for the Welsh Schoolboys in 1937 when he had been recommended for a scholarship to Rydal by legendary rugby player Wilf Wooller. At Rydal, he played at outside half and was seen as one of the school's star players and managed to play for Cardiff Athletic during the 1938/39 season before the outbreak of the war. He worked for the Steel Company of Wales.

== Second World War ==
During the Second World War he joined the Royal Air Force. Trained as a fighter pilot in Arizona, he was switched to and trained as a glider pilot, attached to the Glider Pilot Regiment.

Williams took part in various Commando and Parachute Regiment campaigns, piloting a glider in Operation Varsity – the crossing of the River Rhine into Germany – with a cargo of medical and radio supplies. He then spent a week sleeping rough, before bumping into his commanding officer, Hugh Bartlett DFC, the Sussex County Cricket Club batsman, on a Friday morning: "Williams aren't you meant to be at Welford Road tomorrow playing for Great Britain against the Dominions? They need you. Go now!" Williams caught the last supply plane to RAF Brize Norton that night, and although the team didn't win he did score a try. He couldn't win the match but did score a glorious try. He turned out for both the RAF and the Great Britain United rugby teams.

== Rugby career ==
During war-time Williams joined Cardiff and switched his position to centre. He was offered £6,000 to play rugby league for Leeds but turned down the offer He forged a famous centre partnership for Cardiff with Dr Jack Matthews and along with Billy Cleaver they made one of the most formidable midfield trios the club has ever produced. Each of Bleddyn's seven brothers also played for Cardiff, and his younger brother Lloyd represented Wales in the 1960s. At one time four of the siblings played in the same Cardiff team together and between them had a Cardiff career that spanned thirty years. Bleddyn Williams played 283 games for Cardiff and scored 185 tries for the club, including a club record 41 tries in the 1947–48 season.

=== International career ===
Williams made his debut for Wales in January 1947 against England as a fly-half, playing alongside Haydn Tanner. He went on to win a further 21 Welsh caps, all as a centre, making his final appearance against Scotland in January 1955. He scored seven tries, for a total of 21 points in internationals. Williams captained Wales in five matches, four times in 1953 and once in 1955, in his final international. He led the side to victory in all five games. In 1953 he had the unique distinction of captaining his club (Cardiff), and his country (Wales), to victory against the touring New Zealand All Blacks.

Williams was a member of the 1950 British Lions tour to New Zealand and Australia and played three of the four tests against New Zealand (missing the first test through injury) and both tests against Australia. He captained the Lions in the third and fourth tests against New Zealand, deputising for the injured captain Karl Mullen. Williams scored one international try for the Lions, in the first test against Australia.

== Later life ==
After injury forced him to retire at the age of 32 in 1955, Williams began a career in the media, establishing himself as an authoritative commentator on the game. He was the rugby union correspondent of the Sunday People for 30 years.

He was made an MBE in the 2005 New Year Honours list, an award he accepted with typical modesty by saying he owed it to his team mates.

He was the president of Cardiff Athletic Club

== Personal life ==
Post war, Williams married Violet; the couple had a son and two daughters. In 1979, Violet gave Williams the Kiss of Life after he collapsed with an embolism. Violet later died of cancer. On 6 July 2009, Williams died at the Holme Tower medical centre in Cardiff, after suffering ill health for some time.

== Bibliography ==
- Griffiths, John (1987). The Phoenix Book of International Rugby Records. London: J. M. Dent & Sons Ltd. ISBN 0-460-07003-7.
- Smith, David; Williams, Gareth (1980). Fields of Praise: The Official History of The Welsh Rugby Union. Cardiff: University of Wales Press. ISBN 0-7083-0766-3.
- Thomas, Clem; Thomas, Greg (2005). The History of The British and Irish Lions. Mainstream Books. ISBN 1-84596-030-0.
- Thomas, Wayne (1979). A Century of Welsh Rugby Players. Ansells Ltd.
