= Llandaff RFC =

Welsh rugby union club, based in Llandaff

(Wales) Llandaff RFC
- Full name: Llandaff Rugby Football Club
- Founded: 1876
- Location: Llandaff, Wales
- Ground: Bishop's Field
- Chairman: Mark Woodman
- Director of Rugby: Mike Connor
- Coach: Luke Somerset Daf Rees James Rowlands
- Captain: Doug Wilson
- League: WRU Division 2 East Central
Team kit

Official website
- www.llandaffrugby.org

Llandaff Rugby Football Club is a rugby union club based in Llandaff, a district of Cardiff in Wales. They presently play in the Welsh Rugby Union WRU League 3 East Central B.

== History ==
Llandaff RFC was formed in 1876 by Cambridge graduate Illtyd Thomas, and these links are reflected in the team still playing in Cambridge blue. It is believed that Llandaff were one of nine teams that were represented at the Tenby Hotel in 1880, in an early attempt to found the Welsh Rugby Union.

In 1881 Llandaff RFC player, Leonard Watkins, played in the first Welsh international, against England.

For the 1887/1888 season. Llandaff's record was; Played 18, Won 13, Drew 3, Lost 2. Llandaff had drawn 2 matches with Penarth RFC and won against Cardiff RFC 2nds. The following season, 1888/1889, Llandaff's record was; Played 22, Won 11, Drew 6, Lost 5. The 2nd XV's also won 10 out of 12 matches. Llandaff also reached the Cardiff District Challenge Cup final, losing to Penarth by 2 goals, 1 try and 3 minors to 1 minor on 13 March 1889 at the Cardiff Arms Park.

Playing against other South Wales club sides, they gained early success winning the South Wales Challenge Cup during the 1891/92 season. Unusual for a Welsh rugby team, Llandaff has played their rugby on the same pitch, Bishop's Field, since their inception, though like all clubs in Wales the team ceased playing during the First World War. The team reformed after the war but lost their WRU status, and could not play in official competitions. It wasn't until 1948 that Llandaff reapplied and were successful in regaining membership of the WRU.

In October 2023 they added a mixed Walking Rugby team for the over 50's known as the Llandaff Chiefs

In August 2024, the club beat the Kyrgyzstan national team 38–36.

== Club honours ==
- 2008/09 WRU Division Four East - Champions
- 2022/23 WRU Division Four East Central - Champions

== Notable former players ==
- (Wales) Chris Czekaj (6 caps)
- (Wales) Leonard Watkins (1 cap 1881)
- (Wales) Rex Willis (21 caps)
- (Wales) Louis Rees-Zammit (7 caps)

== See also ==
- Llandaff Fields
