= Jack Matthews (rugby union) =

GB Lions & Wales international rugby union player (1920-2012)

Jack Matthews OBE
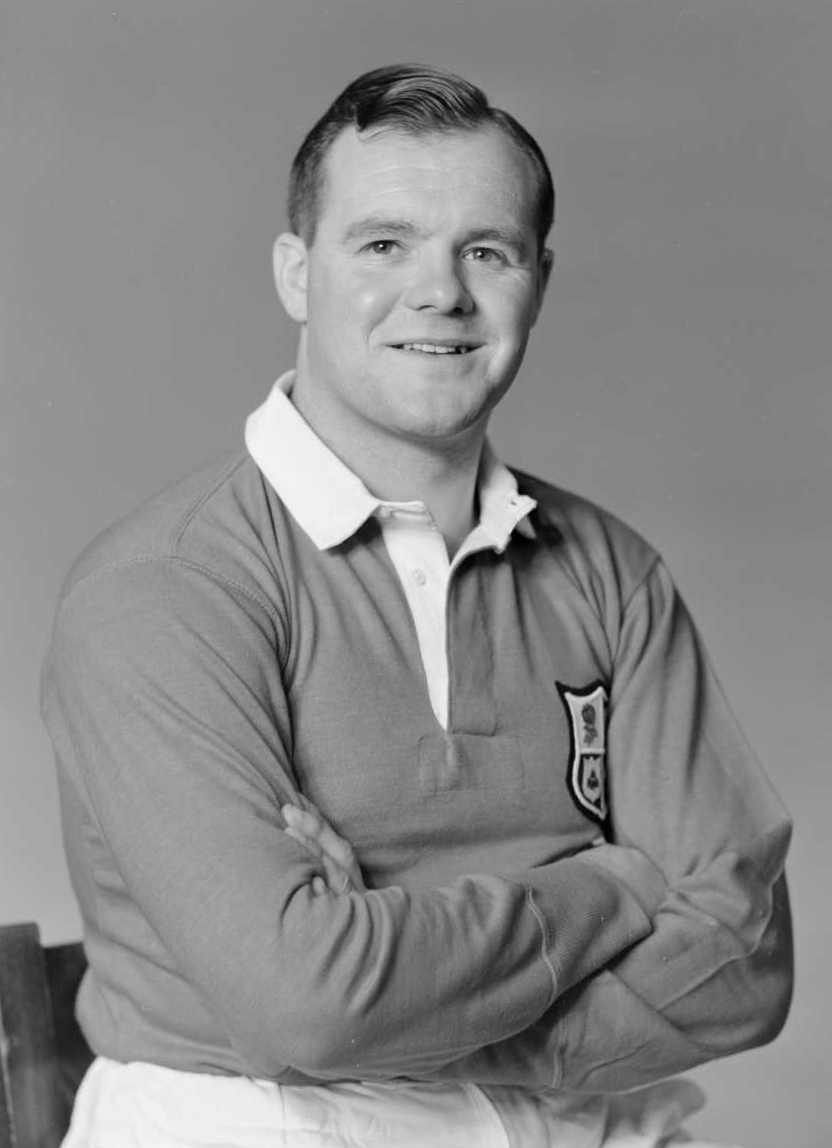
- Matthews in New Zealand in 1950
- Born: 21 June 1920 Bridgend, Wales
- Died: 18 July 2012 (aged 92)
- Height: 1.73 m (5 ft 8 in)
- Weight: 93 kg (205 lb)
- School: Bridgend County School
- University: Welsh National School of Medicine
- Occupation: General practitioner

Rugby union career
- Position: Centre
Amateur team(s)
Years	Team	Apps	(Points)
- Bridgend RFC
- Cardiff Medicals RFC
- Cardiff RFC
1949	Newport RFC		
–	Army		
–	Barbarian F.C.		
–	Hampshire		
International career
Years	Team	Apps	(Points)
1947–1951	Wales	17	(12)
1950	British Lions	6	(0)

Jack Matthews OBE (21 June 1920 – 18 July 2012) was a Welsh physician and rugby union international centre who played first-class club rugby for Cardiff and Newport. Along with Bleddyn Williams, Matthews formed a centre partnership which is regarded as one of the finest in the game. He was also a devastating tackler, once described as "a cross between a bulldozer and a brick wall". Matthews won 17 caps for Wales and six with the British Lions, though his career was curtailed by the Second World War. Matthews was a general practitioner by profession and travelled with the 1980 Lions on their tour of South Africa as the team doctor.

== Early history ==
Born in Bridgend, South Wales in 1920, Matthews attended Bridgend County School before matriculating to the Welsh National School of Medicine. From a youth he was a keen sportsperson, and in 1937 he won the Welsh AAA junior 220 yards title. A year later, after spending three seasons in the Welsh Secondary Schools rugby team, he played in a senior Wales trial, at just eighteen years old. In 1939 he came second in the Senior Men's AAA 100 yards and third in the 220 yards.

== Second World War ==
With the outbreak of the Second World War, Matthews applied to join the Royal Air Force, but was required to train as a doctor at the Welsh School of Medicine. Matthews was later commissioned into the Royal Army Medical Corps. Bleddyn Williams, an RAF trainee and later Matthew's centre partner for Wales, played with Matthews for the first time whilst stationed in South Wales. The duo were part of a South Wales team that faced an Ack Ack XV in 1942. Williams was later switched to and trained as a glider pilot, attached to the Glider Pilot Regiment.

Whilst stationed at RAF St Athan air base in the Vale of Glamorgan in 1943, Matthews fought future world champion Rocky Marciano in an amateur boxing match. Marciano famously ended his career having won every professional match he fought in, but Matthews held him to a draw in a 4 rounder.

== Rugby career ==
Before winning his first cap, Matthews took part in five Victory Internationals for Wales, including the win over France in which he was captain. Matthews played 17 Tests for Wales and six for the British & Irish Lions on their 1950 tour of New Zealand and Australia. He was the team doctor for the 1980 British Lions tour to South Africa, and was a medical doctor by profession. Matthews played centre for Wales and Cardiff – forming one of the greatest midfield pairings Wales has ever had with Bleddyn Williams.

== Personal life ==
After the war, Matthews married Valerie and the couple went on to have two sons, Peter and Robin. Valerie died in 1996.

== Later life ==
Matthews continued his connection with sport after retiring from playing rugby. He maintained links with boxing, becoming the medical officer to the Welsh Boxing Association. He was also chosen to be the medical doctor for the 1980 British Lions tour of South Africa.

Despite his close links with rugby, Matthews showed an uncompromising stance in his views on how the game should be played. In 2004, he publicly criticised Sir Clive Woodward's coaching methods before the 2005 British & Irish Lions tour to New Zealand. In the 1981 Birthday Honours, he was appointed an Officer of the Order of the British Empire (OBE) for services to rugby football.

In 2009, Matthews suffered a severe stroke that left him speechless. He died in July 2012, aged 92.

== Bibliography ==
- Hignall, Andrew; Prescott, Gwyn (2007). Cardiff: Sporting Greats. Stroud: Stadia. ISBN 978-0-7524-4286-0.
- Smith, David; Williams, Gareth (1980). Fields of Praise: The Official History of The Welsh Rugby Union. Cardiff: University of Wales Press. ISBN 0-7083-0766-3.
- Thomas, Wayne (1979). A Century of Welsh Rugby Players. Ansells Ltd.
