= Cardiff RFC =

Welsh rugby union club, based in Cardiff

(Wales) Cardiff RFC
- Nickname(s): Blue & Blacks/The Rags
- Founded: 1876; 150 years ago
- Location: Cardiff, Wales
- Ground: Cardiff Arms Park (Capacity: 12,125)
- Chairman: Chris Collins
- Coach: Dan Fish
- Captain: Sean Moore
- League: Super Rygbi Cymru
- 2025-2026: Super Rygbi Cymru, 1st (playoff semi-finalists)
Team kit

Official website
- www.cardiffrfc.com

Cardiff Rugby Football Club (Welsh: Clwb Rygbi Caerdydd) is a rugby union club based in Cardiff, the capital city of Wales. The club was founded in 1876 and played their first few matches at Sophia Gardens, before shortly relocating to Cardiff Arms Park where they have been based ever since.

They built a reputation as one of the great clubs in world rugby, largely through a series of wins against international touring sides. Cardiff have beaten both South Africa and New Zealand, and Australia have failed to beat the club in six attempts. Through its history Cardiff RFC have provided more players to the Welsh national side and British and Irish Lions than any other Welsh club.

Following the 2003 regionalisation of Welsh rugby, Cardiff Rugby became the professional arm of the organisation with the team branded Cardiff RFC playing in the semi-pro Welsh Premier League. The rugby section of the Cardiff Athletic Club run and administer the team alongside Cardiff Rugby.The team now has the nickname The Rags, the tradition nickname for Cardiff's second-string team.

== History ==
=== Amateur years ===
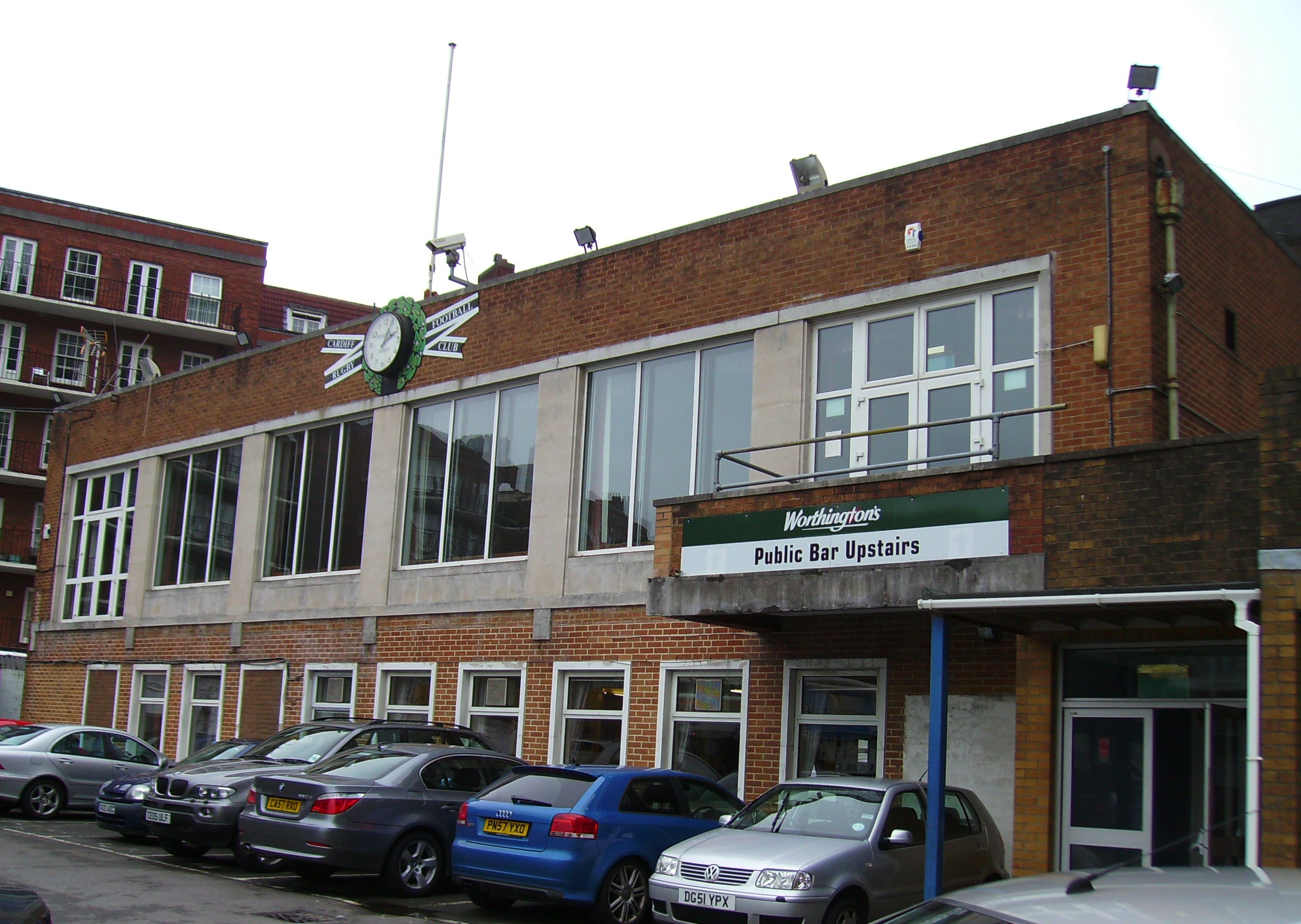
Cardiff RFC clubhouse

The first recognised team to begin playing rugby in Cardiff was Glamorgan Football Club, formed as a club team while Cardiff was still a town. The team was formed by a group of young men during the 1873/74 season, after a circular letter was sent to interested parties by S. Campell Cory. Playing under the Cheltenham College rules, Glamorgan FC had increased its membership to sixty six by November 1874. 1874 saw Glamorgan's first away game, against Cowbridge Grammar School, and by 1875 the team played its first encounter with Newport. Around 1875, two further clubs came into existence in Cardiff, they were Tredegarville Football Club, whose ranks included Jas. Bush, father of future Cardiff rugby hero Percy Bush; and the Wanderers Football Club whose captain and founder was William David Phillips. Of the three teams, Glamorgan and Wanderers became the most notable, but both teams rarely travelled, and both had difficulty beating the now established clubs of Newport and Swansea. The supporters of both clubs started an agitation in the summer of 1876 for the two clubs to amalgamate, to give Cardiff town a better chance of beating the neighbouring teams. On Friday 22 September 1876 members of the Glamorgan and Wanderers clubs met at the Swiss Hall in Queen Street, Cardiff and decided to make a single club, to be called Cardiff Football Club. The first team captain was Donaldson Selby of Glamorgan and the vice-captain W.D. Phillips of Wanderers. Initially the club strip was black with a white skull and crossbones, but after pressure from the players parents to change what they saw as an inappropriate strip, the team adopted the black and blue of Cambridge University; after club player Thomas William Rees of Caius College brought his university strip to the club.

Cardiff FC played their first fixture on 2 December 1876, versus Newport at Wentloog Marshes. In 1881, Cardiff beat Llanelli to win the South Wales Challenge Cup, though the tournament was scrapped soon after due to persistent crowd trouble.

In 1881, Newport based sports administrator, Richard Mullock, formed the first Welsh international rugby team. Despite the team losing heavily to England, Mullock had chosen four players from Cardiff to represent the team; club captain William David Phillips, vice-captain B. B. Mann, Barry Girling and Leonard Watkins, a reflection on the clubs importance at the time. A month later, on 12 March 1881, Cardiff RFC was one of the eleven clubs present at the formation of the Welsh Rugby Union in Neath.

A notable early player was Frank Hancock. A skilful centre, Hancock first played for Cardiff due to an injury to a first regular. At this time, rugby was played with six backs and nine forwards but Hancock's performance so impressed the selectors that for the next game they selected him as a seventh back and selected only eight forwards. The system was soon adopted by the Welsh national team and the seven backs and eight forwards system exists in rugby to this day. Cardiff RFC and Hancock were jointly recognised by the International Rugby Board in 2011 for this innovation with induction to the IRB Hall of Fame.

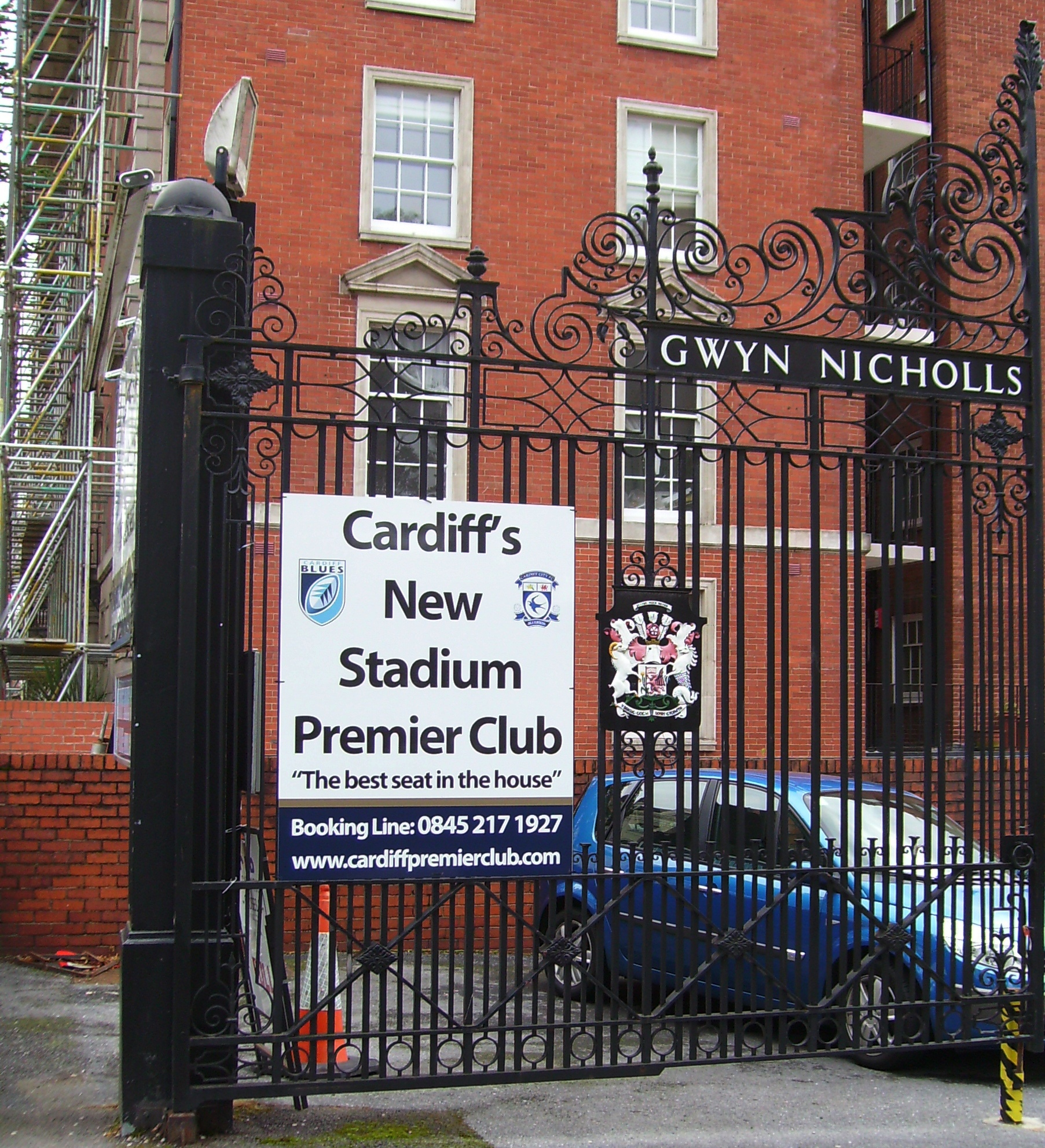
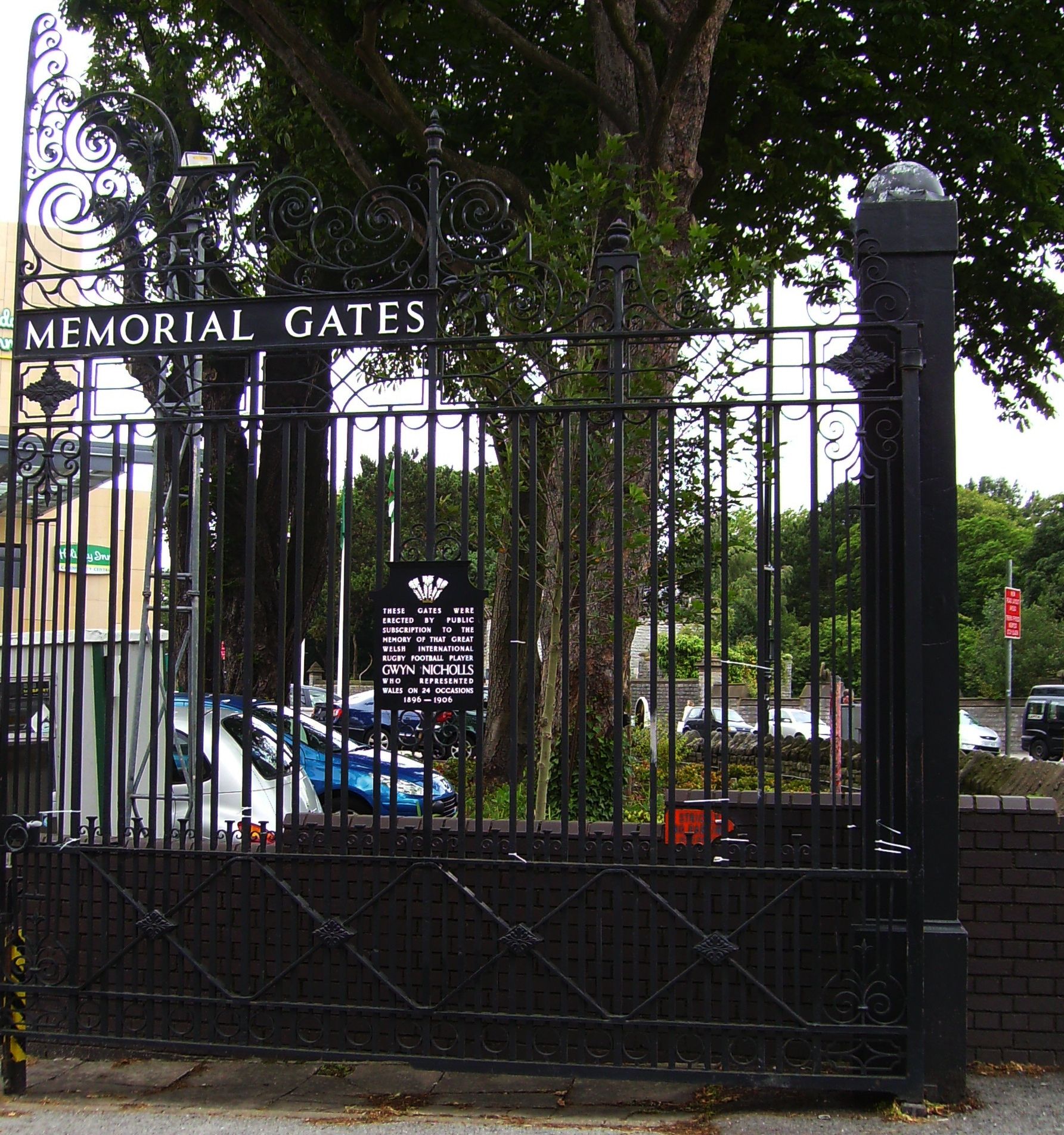
Gwyn Nicholls Memorial Gates to Cardiff Arms Park.

In 1898, Cardiff were unofficial club champions of Wales for the first time. One year later, centre Gwyn Nicholls became the first Cardiff player to play for the British and Irish Lions (then only representing the British Isles), and scored a try in both the first and second Tests against Australia. Nicholls would also go on to captain Wales between 1902 and 1906. In 1904, Cardiff players fly-half Percy Bush, centre Rhys Gabe (who later captained Wales in 1907) and Arthur 'Boxer' Harding all went on the Lions tour to Australia and New Zealand (Nicholls was not selected). Bush scored in the first and second test against Australia, as Nicholls had, and thanks to his tries and goal-kicking during the first three Tests, finished as the top Test points scorer. Gabe scored a try in the third test against Australia, while Harding converted a try in the first Test and was the only Lions player to get on the score sheet against New Zealand, after scoring a penalty goal in the game against them at the end of the tour.

In 1905, there were four Cardiff players in the Wales team that famously beat New Zealand: Harding, Nicholls, Bush, Gabe and Bert Winfield, who would go on to captain Wales three years later. After an eight-year wait, Cardiff also managed to win the unofficial Welsh club championship in 1906 (going unbeaten in every game they played apart from against New Zealand) and 1907.

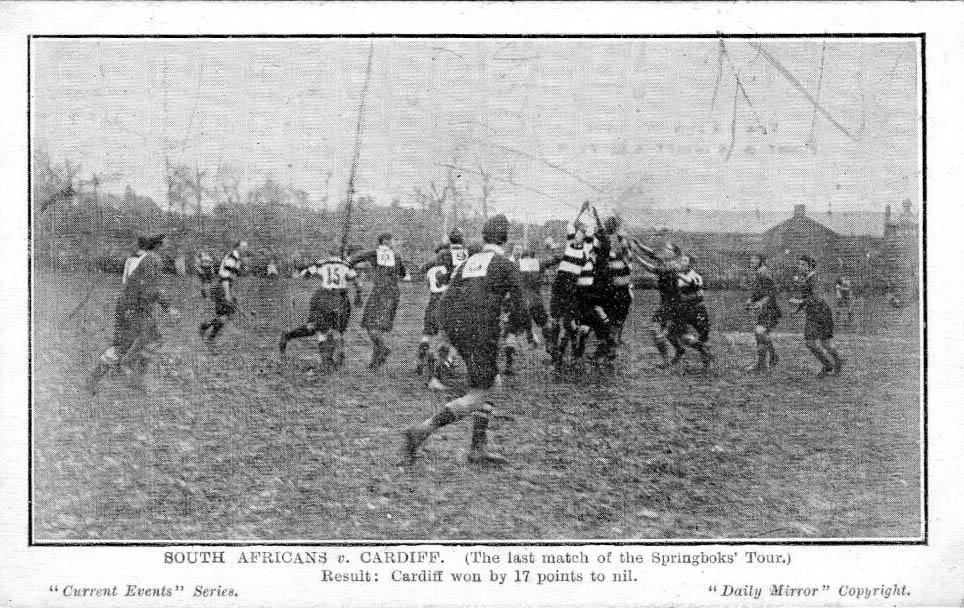
A moment of the match where Cardiff beat South Africa 17–0 at Arms Park

On New Year's Day 1907, Cardiff beat South Africa 17–0, a great achievement considering the national side had been beaten 11–0 by the Boks only a month earlier, and France were thrashed by them 55–6 two days later. The only other team to beat South Africa during their 29-match tour were Scotland.

After this performance, and Wales winning the Five Nations Grand Slam for the first time in 1908, four Cardiff players were selected for the Lions in 1908. Harding was selected as the first Cardiff player to captain the tour and was the only one of the four to have played for the Lions before, the other three being uncapped half-back Willie Morgan, and three-quarters Johnny Williams and Reggie Gibbs. Gibbs remains the only player to have been capped for Wales at least 10 times and averaged more than a try a game, with 17 tries in 16 caps, and Williams came very close to his record with 17 tries in 17 Tests.

The tour was not a success, with the Lions managing to draw the second Test but losing the first and third by over twenty-five points each. However, Gibbs did manage to score in the first Test. The disappointed players made up for their failure the next year by winning the Grand Slam with Wales for the second time in a row and winning the unofficial championship with Cardiff. Cardiff also beat Australia 24–8 on 28 December 1908. However, following this, the glory years were largely over for Cardiff and Wales, although Wales did manage to win the Grand Slam in 1911, and Cardiff came within one point of beating South Africa in a 7–6 defeat in 1912. But no Cardiff players were selected for another Lions tour for the next sixteen years, and they would not become Welsh champions again for the best part of three decades.

==== Between the wars ====
The First World War certainly had some effect on the club – Johnnie Williams died in the first weeks of the Battle of the Somme, and many other players returned wounded or simply too old to play rugby. Cardiff were forced to turn to younger talent for their team. Jim Sullivan was a prime example of this, making his first appearance for Cardiff at the age of 16 in October 1920, and went on to make 38 appearances over the rest of the season. In December 1920, just after his 17th birthday, he became the youngest player to ever appear for the Barbarians. However, in June 1921 he signed for professional rugby league club Wigan, beginning a new trend of Welsh union players "going north" to play rugby league.

Cardiff rugby finally managed a revival of some sort in the 1930s. Scrum-half Howard Poole, although never capped for Wales, was selected to play for the Lions in 1930, as was Ivor Williams in 1938. The club also won their first unofficial Welsh championship for 28 years in 1937, and managed to retain the title in 1938 and 1939, before the start of the Second World War.

==== After the Second World War ====
After the resumption of regular rugby, Cardiff beat Australia 11–3 on 21 November 1947, captained by scrum-half Haydn Tanner and were also unofficial Welsh champions in 1947/48, when Bleddyn Williams set a club record of 41 tries in one season, and 1948/49, when the Blue and Blacks went completely unbeaten against Welsh opposition, only Swansea and Newport succeeding in salvaging draws. The club had a fantastic record against Newport during these years, going 15 games unbeaten against them between 1946 and 1950. Cardiff players helped Wales win their first Grand Slam in nearly forty years in 1950, and later that year supplied five players to the Lions for the first time later that year. The five were fly-half Billy Cleaver, prop Cliff Davies, centre Jack Matthews, scrum-half Rex Willis and Bleddyn Williams, the "Prince of Centres". Williams captained the Lions in the third and fourth Tests against New Zealand. Wales won another Grand Slam in 1952, with much the same side.

In 1952–53, Cardiff won the unofficial Welsh championship again, helped by the rise of prodigiously talented fly-half Cliff Morgan, but the best was still to come. On 21 November 1953, Cardiff faced New Zealand in front of a crowd of 56,000 at the Arms Park and, after a brilliant defensive effort following a 5–0 lead at half-time, hung on to win 8–3. Five Cardiff backs were selected in the Wales team captained by Bleddyn Williams that beat the All Blacks again less than a month later. These two results remain the last time either Cardiff or Wales have beaten New Zealand.

Cardiff repeated their unofficial championship victory two years later in 1955, and had three Lions in the 1955 touring side, notable for not including any of the five that toured in 1950. The three this time were fly-half Morgan, centre Gareth Griffiths and wing Haydn Morris. Morgan, in front of a then-world record crowd of 100,000, helped defeat the South Africans 23–22 with a brilliant try despite an injury to Reg Higgins reducing the Lions to 14 men (no replacements were allowed at this time). After the South Africans squared the series in the second Test, Morgan was made captain for the third Test and inspired the team with a combination a stirring team talk and a great kicking game to a 9–6 victory, ensuring the series could not be lost, after which he was dubbed "Morgan the Magnificent" by the South African press. After his Lions heroics Morgan was made captain of Wales, and helped them win the title (although not the Grand Slam) in 1956.

Australia played against and were defeated by Cardiff for the third time in 1957, 14–11 thanks to two great tries from Gordon Wells, after which a reporter from the Sydney Daily Telegraph wrote "we fell to the world's best rugby union club", and another unofficial championship title was secured in 1957–58, but only second row Bill "Roddy" Evans was selected for the Lions in 1959, although he started four of the six Tests. A downturn in Welsh and Cardiff fortunes occurred around this time, although prop Kingsley Jones and second row Keith Rowlands from the club were still selected for the 1962 Lions tour, and Cardiff managed to come within a point of beating the All Blacks again in 1963, scoring the only try of the game. However, the slump began to end in 1964, when Wales shared the Five Nations title with Scotland, after which Wales won the Triple Crown and the title in 1965, followed by another championship in 1966, although the Grand Slam still eluded them. However, these successes helped Cardiff players centre Ken Jones and prop Howard Norris win places on the Lions tour to New Zealand. Later that year Cardiff beat Australia 14–8, although Wales were not able to repeat the feat a month later, losing 14–11.

The 1968 Lions tour was a historic one, containing a record six Cardiff players, wings Keri Jones and Maurice Richards, prop John O'Shea, (then) centre Gerald Davies, fly-half Barry John and scrum-half Gareth Edwards. While Jones and Richards would soon switch codes to play rugby league and O'Shea's tour would be marred somewhat by being the first Lion ever to be sent off for foul play, Davies, John and Edwards would go on to become legends, although their careers got off to inauspicious starts, the Lions losing three of the Tests again South Africa and only drawing the other one.

On the domestic front, they were denied silverware, as despite being top of the unofficial table for almost the whole season, the loss of their six Lions at the end of the season allowed Llanelli to overtake them. Cardiff again finished second behind Newport the next year, with Richards the only Lion to make more than 20 appearances. However, Wales won the Five Nations title and Triple Crown in 1969, only denied the Grand Slam by a draw in France, only to be whitewashed in three games against New Zealand and Australia in the summer.

==== 1970s ====
1971 however, was the year in which John, Edwards and Davies would write themselves into history. Davies by this time had left for London Welsh, although he would later return. In the spring, they were all ever-presents in Wales's first Grand Slam in 18 years, and in the summer, they were selected for the Lions tour to New Zealand, along with Cardiff teammate John Bevan. The tour remains the only occasion where the Lions have returned victorious from New Zealand. All four Cardiff players started the first Test, and all except Bevan played in the other three Tests. Despite only playing in the first Test, John Bevan became the Lions' record try scorer (including matches against club teams) with 17. Barry John was given the title "King Barry" by the New Zealanders after scoring 30 of the Lions' 48 points, and in him and Edwards, Cardiff could justifiably be said to have the best two half-backs in the world.

1971–72 was the first season where the WRU Challenge Cup was introduced. Cardiff reached the semi-final, before being beaten 16–9 at the Brewery Field by Neath, who went on to beat Llanelli in the final. Unfortunately in 1972 Barry John announced his decision to retire at the age of 27, not liking the celebrity status shoved on him and his family after the Lions tour.

The next season was also disappointing for Cardiff, although fullback John Davies scored a club record of 209 points (in his first season for the club). They were soundly beaten by New Zealand 20–4, only a week after Llanelli had beaten them 9–3. In the Cup, they defeated South Wales Police, Mountain Ash, Ebbw Vale, Blaina and Swansea on their way to the final, but were again outclassed and lost 30–7 to Llanelli. In 1973–74 Cardiff reached the Cup semi-finals for the third year running, but were defeated 9–4 by Aberavon. Gareth Edwards however, led his country to a 24–0 win over Australia in November 1973. In 1974, Gerald Davies decided to return to Cardiff from London Welsh. Edwards and Davies were picked for the 1974 Lions tour to South Africa (although Davies refused to go in protest against apartheid) and Edwards started all four Tests, where the Lions went unbeaten through all 22 matches and would probably have won all their games, but in the final Test the South African referee blew the final whist four minutes early with the scores level and the Lions camped on the South African line.

In 1974–75 Cardiff failed to reach the WRU Challenge Cup semi-finals for the first time, losing 13–12 to Bridgend in the third round, despite not conceding a try in the entire Cup. However, on 1 November 1975, Cardiff met Australia for the fifth time in their history and, for the fifth time defeated them, 14–9, despite the absence of Edwards due to influenza. Both Edwards and Davies represented Wales in the 1976 Five Nations Grand Slam. During 1976–77, Cardiff defeated Pontypool and Aberavon on their way to the Challenge Cup final, where they were beaten 16–15 by Newport. Edwards decided not to go on the 1977 Lions tour, to show loyalty to his company who had let him go on three Lions tours previously. However, another Cardiff scrum-half, uncapped Brynmor Williams was picked, and played in the first three Tests before being injured in the third.

Both Davies and Edwards started for Wales in the 20–16 victory away to Ireland in the 1978 Five Nations that sealed a record three Triple Crowns in as many years, with Edwards also starting the next week and also dropping a goal in the 16–7 victory against France that sealed Wales their third Grand Slam in eight years. This was Gareth Edwards' final match for Wales – he had won 53 consecutive caps, never being dropped or injured, and scored 20 tries. Gerald Davies also retired from Wales after a 19–17 defeat in Sydney – tied with Edwards on 20 tries, scored in 46 caps.

In the 1977–78 club season, Davies had a fantastic game against Pontypool where despite only touching the ball four times due to the dominance of the Pooler pack, he scored four tries, with those being Cardiff's only points in a 16–11 victory. Cardiff's cup run continued to the semi-finals, where they were beaten by Swansea 18–13.

==== 1980s ====
Flanker Stuart Lane, fly-half Gareth Davies, hooker Alan Phillips and scrum-half Terry Holmes from the club were chosen to tour with the Lions to South Africa in 1980, however Davies was the only one to start a Test match. The four went on to help Cardiff finally break their duck and win the WRU Challenge Cup (known as the Schweppes Cup for sponsorship reasons) with a 14–6 victory over Bridgend the following season, with Davies scoring two penalties and tries from centre Neil Hutchings and back-rower Robert Lakin. They repeated the feat in 1982, winning on try count thanks to a score from prop Ian Eidman after a 12–12 draw again against Bridgend, with the other points coming from fly-half David Barry, and also ended a 24-year wait by winning the Unofficial Welsh Championship, thereby completing the club's first (and so far only) league and cup double.

In 1983, Terry Holmes was again picked for the Lions, this time alongside second row Bob Norster. Both players were picked for the first team but Holmes was injured in the first Test and Norster in the second, ending their tours. Cardiff had been knocked in the quarter-finals of the 1982–83 cup by eventual winners Pontypool, but made it up for it with a third triumph in four years, beating Neath 24–19 in the final with tries from flanker Owen Golding and wing Gerald Cordle and 16 points from Gareth Davies. Then, on 12 October 1984, they beat Australia 16–12, thanks to eight points from Gareth Davies along with a penalty try and a score from Adrian Hadley. The same Australian side went on to complete a "Grand Slam" (beating England, Scotland, Wales and Ireland). Australia haven't played Cardiff RFC since, leaving the club with a perfect record of six wins from six games against the Wallabies (although Cardiff Blues did lose to Australia 31–3 in 2009). 1985 was very nearly another successful year for the club, beating Neath and Pontypool on their way to the Schweppes Cup final where, despite tries from wing Gerald Cordle and captain Alan Phillips alongside two penalties from Gareth Davies, they fell to an agonising 15–14 defeat to Llanelli. After this, Terry Holmes left the club to play rugby league.

The club bounced back immediately however, beating Newport in the final of 1985–86 cup final 28–21, with Adrian Hadley scoring a hat-trick, Holmes's replacement, scrum-half Neil O'Brien, bagging another try and 12 points coming from the boot of fly-half Gareth Davies in his last game for the club against Welsh opposition before retiring. One year later, Cardiff were part of the first Challenge Cup final to go to extra time, with the scores 9–9 after 80 minutes, all Cardiff's points coming from the boot of Davies's replacement, Geraint John. Gerald Cordle scored to break the deadlock but the conversion was missed and Swansea scored a converted try soon after, putting them in the lead. But a late drop goal from full-back Mike Rayer won it for the Arms Park side capping one of the most successful periods in the club's history, with five Schweppes Cup victories in seven years.

In 1987, the first Rugby World Cup was held in New Zealand. Cardiff props Dai Young, Jeff Whitefoot and Steve Blackmore, wing Adrian Hadley, centre Mark Ring and hooker Alan Phillips all were selected in Wales's squad (Young was called up as an injury replacement) which finished third. Cardiff's success began to tail off towards the end of the 1980s, with Adrian Hadley leaving for rugby league in 1988 and Gerald Cordle following in 89, and they could only manage two Cup quarter-finals and one semi-final appearance in the last three years of the decade. However, both Dai Young and Bob Norster were selected for the Lions tour to Australia in 1989, the only Lions team to come from 1–0 down to win the series. Young followed Hadley and Cordle to rugby league shortly after this, while Whitefoot and Norster both retired in 1990.

==== League rugby ====
In 1990, the unofficial Welsh championship was replaced by a league structure involving promotion and relegation. Cardiff competed in top flight but could only manage a fourth-place finish in 1990–91, and exited the Cup at the quarter-final stage. The season did involve some highlights however, such as beating league runners-up and Cup champions Llanelli 43–0 at the Arms Park and beating league champions Neath 18–4 away in the last game of the season.

1991–92 was possibly the club's worst-ever season, beset with disagreements between coach Alan Phillips and manager John Scott. Cardiff crashed out of the Cup before the quarter-final stage and lost at home to Maesteg and Newbridge in the league. Their final league finish was ninth, which would have led to their relegation but the WRU decided mid-season to switch to a 12-team Premiership, therefore saving Cardiff and Maesteg from relegation. Both Scott and Phillips resigned following the season.

Australian Alex Evans took over at Cardiff as coach for the 1992–93 season, bringing in former Arms Park legend Terry Holmes and famous ex-Pontypool front-row member Charlie Faulkner as assistants, and helped a turnaround in the club's fortunes, winning their first seven matches of the season and 20 of their first 22 to top the league in the new year. This run came to an end on 23 January; they were knocked out of the Schweppes Cup by St Peter's, who were fourth from bottom of Division Four. The Blue and Blacks only lost four league games all season though, but were unlucky to be competing against Llanelli in the league, who won the double and were considered the best club team in the UK after beating Australia 13–9.

In 1993–94 they slid back to fourth in the league but won the SWALEC Cup (renamed from Schweppes Cup for sponsorship reasons) by beating Llanelli, who'd won the tournament for the last three years running. The score in the final was 15–8, with tries from Mike Rayer and club captain centre Mike Hall and kicks from fly-half Adrian Davies. In 1994–95 Cardiff won the final league title of the amateur era in Wales, as well as reaching the semi-finals of the Cup before going down 16–9 to Swansea.

=== Professionalism ===
With professionalism dawned a new era at Cardiff RFC. It allowed them to sign legendary outside-half Jonathan Davies back from rugby league, and another major change was that there would be a European Cup, sponsored by Heineken, containing teams from France, Ireland, Wales, Italy and Romania (England and Scotland did not join for another year). Cardiff progressed to the knock-out stages in November by drawing with Bordeaux-Begles and beating Ulster. December saw the end of the Alex Evans era, as he departed to return home to Australia. Terry Holmes took charge of the club, and in his first full match the Blue and Blacks beat Leinster away to progress to the first Heineken Cup final. The game was played at Cardiff Arms Park in front of a crowd of 21,800, where despite 18 points from the boot of Adrian Davies, Cardiff were beaten 21–18 by Toulouse after extra time.

Cardiff, despite not losing a league game under Holmes, were runners-up on the domestic front as well, finishing level with Neath on points but coming second on try count. After the end of the 95–96 season Peter Thomas invested money into the club allowing them to sign Rob Howley, Dai Young back from rugby league, Leigh Davies, Gwyn Jones and Justin Thomas for the cost of around £2million. Internationals Mark Ring, Steven Blackmore and the half-backs that had started the Heineken Cup final, Andy Moore and Adrian Davies all departed.

Despite all the new signings, Cardiff lost their first three games of the season, and the 1996/97 season was in many respects worse than the year before – Cardiff were knocked out in the Heineken Cup semi-finals by eventual champions Brive, and in the Welsh Premier Division they fell to third, behind champions Pontypridd and Llanelli. However, after Alex Evans returned to head up the coaching team, that season did lead to some silverware, as Cardiff beat Llanelli 36–26 in the semi-final and Swansea 33–26 in the final of the SWALEC Cup. Grzegorz Kacala and Tony Rees, both forwards part of the Brive team that knocked Cardiff out of the Heineken Cup and went on to win it, were signed for 1997/98 along with Wales internationals Steve Williams and Spencer John (Gareth Thomas also arrived in December from Bridgend).

Despite Cardiff's difficulties, compounded by those of the national team, Howley and Young were both chosen to go on 1997 Lions tour to South Africa. Howley had to return home early due to injury and neither of the two Cardiff players started a Test match.

In the 1997/98 season, Cardiff were Wales's sole representative in the quarter-finals of the Heineken Cup, and were beaten away in rematch of the previous year's quarter-final, by Bath, who would go on to win the tournament. However, their domestic cup campaign ended before the quarter-final stage, losing 24–9 to Ebbw Vale, and they finished runners up to Swansea in the League. Following this season, Alex Evans left Cardiff for Australia for the second time and Terry Holmes was put back in charge.

==== Rebel season ====
Cardiff and Swansea had proposed the formation of a British league, containing the top division English clubs, the two Scottish regional sides (Edinburgh and Glasgow) and four Welsh clubs (seeing as Cardiff had got further than any other Welsh club in every Heineken Cup so far, Swansea were the league champions and they represented the two largest urban areas in Wales, it was assumed two of these clubs would be Cardiff and Swansea).

Both the RFU and the English clubs had agreed to this, but the WRU refused due to an ongoing legal battle with the English clubs over the negotiation of commercial rights (which would lead to the English clubs not participating in the 1998–99 Heineken Cup). Instead, the WRU demanded all top-flight clubs sign 10-year loyalty agreements, where they were guaranteed top-flight status and committed themselves to staying within the Welsh league structure.

Cardiff and Swansea refused to sign these agreements and were expelled from the Welsh Premier Division. The Allied Dunbar Premiership (the English league) teams announced that two teams would have a rest weekend every week allowing them to play friendlies against Cardiff and Swansea. Cardiff's first home match of the season was against Saracens, who'd finished second in the Allied Dunbar Premiership the season before. Cardiff won 40–19 in front of a crowd of 10,021, larger than the entire combined attendance of the Welsh Premier Division that weekend. The club went on to win all their home games, but fell to defeat ten times on their travels.

Although Cardiff and Swansea were both expelled from the Welsh League, they were allowed to continue to compete in the SWALEC Cup against Welsh opposition. Both teams reached the semi-finals, Swansea were to play Cross Keys and Cardiff Llanelli. In the week prior to the game, Cardiff chairman Peter Thomas spoke to the players following a training session, where he emphasised the importance of winning the game, describing it as "the biggest game in the club's history". Cardiff lost 39–10 in a match chief executive Gareth Davies described "The worst performance by a Cardiff side I have ever seen." Six days later, it was announced Terry Holmes would stand down as coach at the end of the season, and Pontypridd and Wales assistant coach Lyn Howells would take charge on a two-year contract.

Swansea went on to beat Llanelli 37–10 in the cup final, but the rebels were still forced to sign loyalty agreements and return to Welsh domestic setup, now including Edinburgh and Glasgow.

==== Lynn Howells ====
After the unsuccessful rebel season, Cardiff signed British Lion outside-half Neil Jenkins, as well as Wales internationals second-row Craig Quinnell and flanker Martyn Williams. The start of the 1999–2000 season for Cardiff was hampered by them missing 13 first choice players due to the World Cup, and in late September they fell to a humiliating 60–18 defeat away to Llanelli at Stradey Park. However, despite this poor start and failing to win in the first rounds of the Heineken Cup, they progressed to the Heineken Cup quarter-finals, where they were beaten by Llanelli, and clinched the Welsh/Scottish League title with three games remaining, The season is also notable for a club record victory of 116–0 over Duvnant in the Welsh/Scottish League, and the club going unbeaten at home for almost the whole season, before losing 41–40 to Swansea in their very last game of the season (with the title already sewn up). This was Cardiff's first defeat at the Arms Park for over two years, since 13 December 1997, again against Swansea.

During the close season Cardiff lost Leigh Davies to Llanelli but signed South African centre Pieter Muller to replace him. They won their first five Welsh/Scottish League matches, seemingly making certain they would retain their title, especially as Swansea lost three of their first five games. The highlight of the season was in late October, when the Blue and Blacks stunned English Premiership leaders Saracens by defeating them home and away in the Heineken Cup.

The club's great form began to stutter as the millennium drew to a close, but it was in January the wheels really came off. After a magnificent 42–16 victory over Ulster, two yellow cards led Cardiff to defeat in Toulouse, meaning they would have to travel to Gloucester in the quarter-finals. A turgid forward battle resulted in a 21–15 defeat for the Blue and Blacks. Two weeks later they then lost to Bridgend, their first home defeat of the season, meaning Swansea pulled ahead in the title race. Another defeat at Ebbw Vale in March condemned them to a trophyless season. Following the unsuccessful season Lynn Howells's contract was not renewed and Rudy Joubert was appointed director of rugby. Gareth Thomas also left the club along with nine other players, but Rob Appleyard, Matt Allen and Craig Hudson all joined.

For the 2001 Lions tour, four Cardiff players were picked, Rob Howley, Neil Jenkins, Dai Young and Martyn Williams. Young became the first player to tour for the Lions in three different decades. Howley started the first two Tests, with Williams on the bench in all three, and Jenkins coming on to replace Jonny Wilkinson in the second. Howley was dropped for the third, deciding Test.

==== Rudy Joubert ====
2001–02 was the first year of the Celtic League, containing teams from Wales, Ireland and Scotland. The pool stage would begin in mid-August and continue on for a month. Cardiff were drawn into the smaller, seven-team pool (with four teams going through to the quarter-finals).and started their campaign in unconvincing fashion, winning three games but still being knocked out of the competition on points difference. In the Heineken Cup, rugby league convert Iestyn Harris, signed for £1million scored a hat-trick on his debut in a 46–7 against Glasgow. Overall the club's European form was mediocre however, as despite winning all their home games they failed to register an away win and were eliminated at the pool stage for the first time in their history. On the domestic front, Cardiff again went unbeaten at home until the final game of the season, but again were unable to back it up on the road and finished fourth – their first season out of the top three in a decade.

==== Dai Young ====
The off season was all change for Cardiff. Rudy Joubert returned home to South Africa and Dai Young became player-coach of the club. Internationals Rob Howley, Neil Jenkins, Craig Quinnell and Jonathan Humphreys all left the club as well. The Welsh/Scottish League was abolished, returning to just nine Welsh teams in the top-flight, and Celtic League games no longer counted towards the domestic league.

In the first two months of the season, Cardiff managed to improve on their Celtic League record from the previous year, winning four out of seven games and progressing to the knockout stage. The quarter final was away to Edinburgh on 30 November and, despite a underperforming in the first half, scoring 19–6 down at the break, a much improved second half performance saw them record a 26–22 win, and go through to the semi-finals.

Their decent start to the season collapsed after that however, with Cardiff failing to score at home for the first-time in 30 years in a 31–0 defeat in the Heineken Cup against Northampton in December. January was a disastrous month for the club too, with a 32–10 thrashing away to Neath in the Celtic League semi-finals, despite the home team making 12 handling errors in Cardiff's 22. Two weeks later the club's first ever Heineken Cup whitewash was completed with a record 75–25 defeat away to Biarritz. Domestically, the Blue and Blacks' final season as a top-tier rugby team was less disappointing. They reached the semi-finals of the Cup, although they capitulated in a similar fashion to their Celtic League semi-final, this time 44–10 away to Llanelli. In the League they finished third, 3 points behind Neath and 11 behind Bridgend.

==== Today ====
Today, Cardiff Rugby Club Ltd runs two distinct teams.

Cardiff Rugby now back at Cardiff Arms Park after three years playing at Cardiff City Stadium. The professional side, Cardiff Rugby take part in the United Rugby Championship and Rugby Challenge Cup. The semi professional Cardiff RFC side take part in the Super Rygbi Cymru and SRC Cup.

In 2019, Steve Law's team won the WRU Challenge Cup, beating Merthyr 25–19 in the final. The following season they led the league table and remained on course for a league and cup double when the COVID-19 pandemic brought an abrupt end to the season and WRU denied awarding honours.

Ahead of the 2021/22 season, Cardiff Rugby academy manager Gruff Rees became Cardiff RFC Director of Rugby, alongside what was described as a new "alignment" with the Cardiff Rugby player pathway. The team were knocked out of the cup by Newport but finished top of the Welsh Premier Division to become champions. In 2023 the club once again won the WRU Premiership Cup, defeating arch rivals Newport 13-10 and finishing top of the Welsh Premiership table, being denied the title by losing in a playoff final to Llandovery.

== The Arms Park ==
Club Rugby games were moved to what was the cricket ground and a new stadium was built in 1969 as a result of an agreement between the Cardiff Athletic Club and the Welsh Rugby Union. On the site of the old Arms Park stadium, a new stadium was built, Welsh National Rugby Ground (also known as The National Stadium). In 1999, a brand new stadium was built in place of the National Stadium, which was named the Millennium Stadium. Cardiff Blues moved from the Arms Park for the 2009/10 season to play at the Cardiff City Stadium in Leckwith, Cardiff – the home of Cardiff City FC. After three seasons Cardiff Blues returned to their 'spiritual home' and will play the majority of future games at their traditional Arms Park home.

== Club honours ==
- Heineken Cup runners-up: 1996
- Western Mail Welsh Championship winners: 1898, 1907, 1909, 1910, 1938, 1937, 1939, 1948, 1949, 1951, 1953, 1956, 1958, 1982
- Mallet Cup winners: 1894
- Middlesex 7s winners: 1939
- Gala Sevens winners: 1964
- Selkirk Sevens winners: 2006
- Snelling Sevens winners: 1955, 1966, 1969, 1972, 1976, 1977, 1981, 1983, 1984
- Welsh Cup: 1981, 1982, 1984, 1986, 1987, 1994, 1997, 2019, 2023
- South Wales Challenge Cup winners: 1881
- Welsh League: 1995
- Welsh/Scottish League: 2000
- Welsh Premiership: 2009, 2022

== British and Irish Lions ==
The following former players were selected for the British and Irish Lions touring squads whilst playing for Cardiff RFC. Gareth Thomas was selected for the 2005 Lions tour whilst playing for Toulouse. Cardiff RFC and its renamed first team Cardiff Rugby has supplied more Lions than any other club.

- (Wales) John Bevan 1971
- (Wales) Percy Bush 1904
- (Wales) Billy Cleaver 1950
- (Wales) Cliff Davies 1950
- (Wales) Gareth Davies 1980
- (Wales) Gerald Davies 1968
- (Wales) Gareth Edwards 1968, 1971, 1974
- (Wales) Roddy Evans 1959
- (Wales) Reggie Gibbs 1908
- (Wales) Rhys Gabe 1904
- (Wales) Gareth Griffiths 1955
- (Wales) Terry Holmes 1980, 1983
- (Wales) Rob Howley 1997, 2001
- (Wales) Neil Jenkins1997, 2001
- (Wales) Barry John 1968, 1971
- (Wales) Kingsley Jones 1962
- (Wales) Ken Jones 1966
- (Wales) Keri Jones 1968
- (Wales) Stuart Lane 1980

- (Wales) Jack Matthews 1950
- (Wales) Cliff Morgan 1955
- (Wales) Willie Morgan 1908
- (Wales) Haydn Morris 1955
- (Wales) Gwyn Nicholls 1899
- (Wales) Howard Norris 1966
- (Wales) Bob Norster 1983, 1989
- (Wales) John O'Shea 1968
- (Wales) Alan Phillips 1980
- (Wales) Howard Poole 1930
- (Wales) Maurice Richards 1968
- (Wales) Keith Rowlands 1962
- (Wales) Bleddyn Williams 1950
- (Wales) Brynmor Williams 1977
- (Wales) Ivor Williams 1938
- (Wales) Johnny Williams 1908
- (Wales) Martyn Williams 2001
- (Wales) Rex Willis 1950
- (Wales) David 'Dai' Young 1989, 1997, 2001

== Wales international captains ==
The following former players captained the Wales national rugby union team whilst playing for Cardiff RFC.

- Joe Simpson 1884
- Frank Hancock 1886
- Frank Hill 1889–94
- Gwyn Nicholls 1902–06
- Rhys Gabe 1907
- Bert Winfield 1908
- Reggie Gibbs 1910
- Johnnie Williams 1911
- Clem Lewis 1923
- Tom Johnson 1925
- Arthur Cornish 1925–26
- Bobby Delahay 1926
- Bernard 'Lou' Turnbull 1927
- Ossie Male 1927–28
- Wilf Wooller 1937–39
- Cliff Jones 1938
- Haydn Tanner 1947–49
- Bill Tamplin 1947

- Jack Matthews 1951
- Bleddyn Williams 1953–55
- Rex Willis 1954–55
- Cliff Morgan 1956
- Lloyd Williams 1961–62
- Gareth Edwards 1968–74
- Gerald Davies 1978
- Gareth Davies 1981–82
- Terry Holmes 1985
- Robert Norster 1988
- Mike Hall 1995
- Jonathan Humphreys 1995–97, 2003
- Robert Norster 1988
- Gwyn Jones 1997
- Robert Howley 1998–99
- Dai Young 2000–01
- Martyn Williams 2003–09
- Gareth Thomas 2003–07

== Other notable former players ==
The following players represented Cardiff and were capped at international level, but do not warrant inclusion in the above two lists.

- (Wales) Billy O'Neill
- (Wales) Arthur Bassett
- (Wales) Norman Biggs
- (Wales) Ronnie Boon
- (Wales) Richie Collins
- (Wales) Terence Cook
- (Wales) Fred Cornish
- (Wales) Dai Fitzgerald
- (Wales) Mike Griffiths
- (Wales) Simon Hill
- (Wales) Viv Huzzey
- (Wales) Cliff Jones

- (Wales) Emyr Lewis
- (Wales) B. B. Mann
- (Wales) Mike Rayer
- (Wales) Mark Ring
- (Wales) Ian Robinson
- (England) John Scott
- (Wales) William Stadden
- (Wales) Anthony Sullivan
- (Wales) Hemi Taylor
- (Wales) Nigel Walker
- (Wales) Frank Whitcombe

== Regional rugby ==
Since the advent of regional rugby in 2003, a number of Cardiff RFC players have gone on to represent Wales (some while still playing for the club rather than the regional side). The Cardiff club side have also had a number of players selected for Wales at U20 level and the Sevens side.

- (Wales) Leigh Halfpenny
- (Wales) Chris Czekaj
- (Wales) Alex Cuthbert
- (Wales) Harry Robinson
- (Wales) Jamie Roberts
- (Wales) Tom James
- (Wales) Lloyd Williams

- (Wales) John Yapp
- (Wales) Bradley Davies
- (Wales) Lloyd Williams
- (Wales) Owen P. Williams
- (Wales) Rhys Patchell

== Games played against international opposition ==
Year	Date	Opponent	Result	Score	Tour
1888	22 December	New Zealand Natives	Win	8–3	1888 New Zealand Natives tour
1905	26 December	New Zealand	Loss	8–10	1905 Original All Blacks tour
1907	1 January	(United Kingdom) South Africa	Win	17–0	1906 South Africa rugby union tour
1908	28 December	Australia	Win	24–8	1908-09 Australia rugby union tour of the British Isles and France
1912	21 December	South Africa	Loss	6–7	1912-13 South Africa rugby union tour
1919	29 March	NZ Army	Draw	0–0	New Zealand Army rugby team of 1919
1924	28 November	New Zealand	Loss	8–16	1924–25 New Zealand tour of United Kingdom, Ireland, France and Canada
1926	6 November	Māori	Loss	8–18	
1926	28 December	Māori	Loss	3–5	
1931	21 November	South Africa	Loss	5–13	1931-32 South Africa rugby union tour
1935	26 October	New Zealand	Loss	5–20	1935-36 New Zealand rugby union tour of the British Isles and Canada
1945	15 September	Australian Air Force	Win	28–3	
1945	3 November	NZ Services	Win	14–3	
1945	26 December	NZ Kiwis	Loss	0–3	
1947	27 September	Australia	Win	11–3	1947–48 Australia tour of the British Isles, Ireland, France and North America
1951	22 September	British and Irish Lions	Loss	12–14	
1951	20 October	South Africa	Loss	9–11	1951-52 South Africa rugby union tour
1953	21 November	New Zealand	Win	8–3	1953–54 New Zealand tour of the British Isles, France and North America
1955	7 September	Romania	Win	6–3	
1956	5 May	NZ Navy	Win	40–10	
1956	1 September	Germany	Win	25–0	
1956	3 October	Italy	Win	8–3	
1957	14 December	Australia	Win	14–11	1957–58 Australia tour of Britain, Ireland and France
1960	29 October	South Africa	Loss	6–13	1960–61 South Africa tour
1963	23 November	New Zealand	Loss	5–6	1963–64 New Zealand tour
1966	3 September	West Germany	Win	41–3	
1966	5 November	Australia	Win	14–8	1966–67 Australia tour
1969	13 December	South Africa	Loss	3–17	1969–70 South Africa tour
1972	27 May	Rhodesia	Win	24–6	
1972	4 November	New Zealand	Loss	4–20	1972–73 New Zealand tour
1975	1 November	Australia	Win	14–9	1975–76 Australia tour of Britain and Ireland
1976	2 October	Argentina	Loss	25–29	1976 Argentina tour of Wales and England
1976	30 October	Italy	Win	54–22	
1978	21 October	New Zealand	Loss	7–17	1978 All Blacks tour of the British Isles
1979	19 September	Canada	Win	19–8	1979 Canada rugby union tour of England, Wales and France
1980	18 October	New Zealand	Loss	9–16	1980 All Blacks tour
1981	6 June	Zimbabwe	Win	34–17	Overseas tour
1981	13 June	Zimbabwe	Win	35–23	
1982	23 October	New Zealand Māori	Loss	10–17	1982 New Zealand Māori rugby union tour of Wales
1984	24 October	Australia	Win	16–12	1984 Australia tour of Britain and Ireland
1985	12 October	Fiji	Win	31–15	1985 Fiji tour of the British Isles
1989	14 October	New Zealand	Loss	15–25	1989 New Zealand rugby union tour
1994	22 October	South Africa	Loss	6–11	1994 South Africa rugby union tour of Britain and Ireland
1995	28 October	Fiji	Win	22–21	1995 Fiji rugby union tour of Wales and Ireland
1996	26 November	Western Samoa	Loss	29–53	1996 Samoa rugby union tour of British Isles

== See also ==
- Rugby in Cardiff
