= Haydn Tanner =

British Lions & Wales international rugby union footballer

- Born: Haydn Tanner; 9 January 1917 Penclawdd, Wales
- Died: 5 June 2009 (aged 92)
- School: Gowerton Grammar School
- University: University College, Swansea

Rugby union career
- Position: Scrum-half
Amateur team(s)
Years	Team	Apps	(Points)
- Bristol Rugby
–	London Welsh RFC		
–	Penclawdd RFC		
–	Swansea RFC		
–	Cardiff RFC		
–	Barbarian F.C.		
International career
Years	Team	Apps	(Points)
- Wales Schools
1935–1949	Wales	25	(0)
1938	British Isles	1	(0)

Haydn Tanner (9 January 1917 – 5 June 2009) was a Welsh international rugby union player who represented both Wales and the British and Irish Lions. At club level, he played for several top-flight teams, including Bristol, Cardiff, Swansea, London Welsh and the Barbarians.

== Personal history ==
Tanner was educated at Gowerton Grammar School and was still a schoolboy when he played at scrum-half for Swansea against the All Blacks at St. Helens in 1935. Swansea won the game by 11 points to 3, with Tanner and his cousin Willie Davies outstanding. The New Zealand captain, Jack Manchester, is said to have passed back the message to New Zealand: "Tell them we have been beaten, but don't tell them it was by a pair of schoolboys".

In December the same year, Tanner won his first cap for Wales at the age of 18 years and 11 months, making him one of the youngest players to appear for Wales. The match was again against the All Blacks and Tanner was again on the winning side. He went on to win 25 international caps, 12 as captain, despite his career being interrupted by the Second World War.

Tanner toured South Africa with the British and Irish Lions in 1938 and played in only one test owing to injury. In 1948 he was captain of the Barbarians against Australia. His last international match was against France in 1949.

He was undoubtedly one of the greatest scrum-halves to ever play the game and, according to the 1950 Lion, Bleddyn Williams, he was "the greatest": "Among all the scrum-halves I've seen and played with, he would reign supreme," said Williams. "He had a superb pass – the best I ever played with. His service was even better than Gareth Edwards."

After retiring from rugby, he became an industrial chemist working in the wood pulp trade for Thompson and Norris. He later became a buyer for Reed International and travelled extensively. He attended the Harvard Business School and became purchasing director for Reed Paper and Board UK. He retired in November, 1980. Having moved to Surrey, he became the coach of Esher and became a member of London Welsh.

Tanner died in his sleep on 5 June 2009, aged 92.
