= Richard Mullock =

Welsh sporting administrator

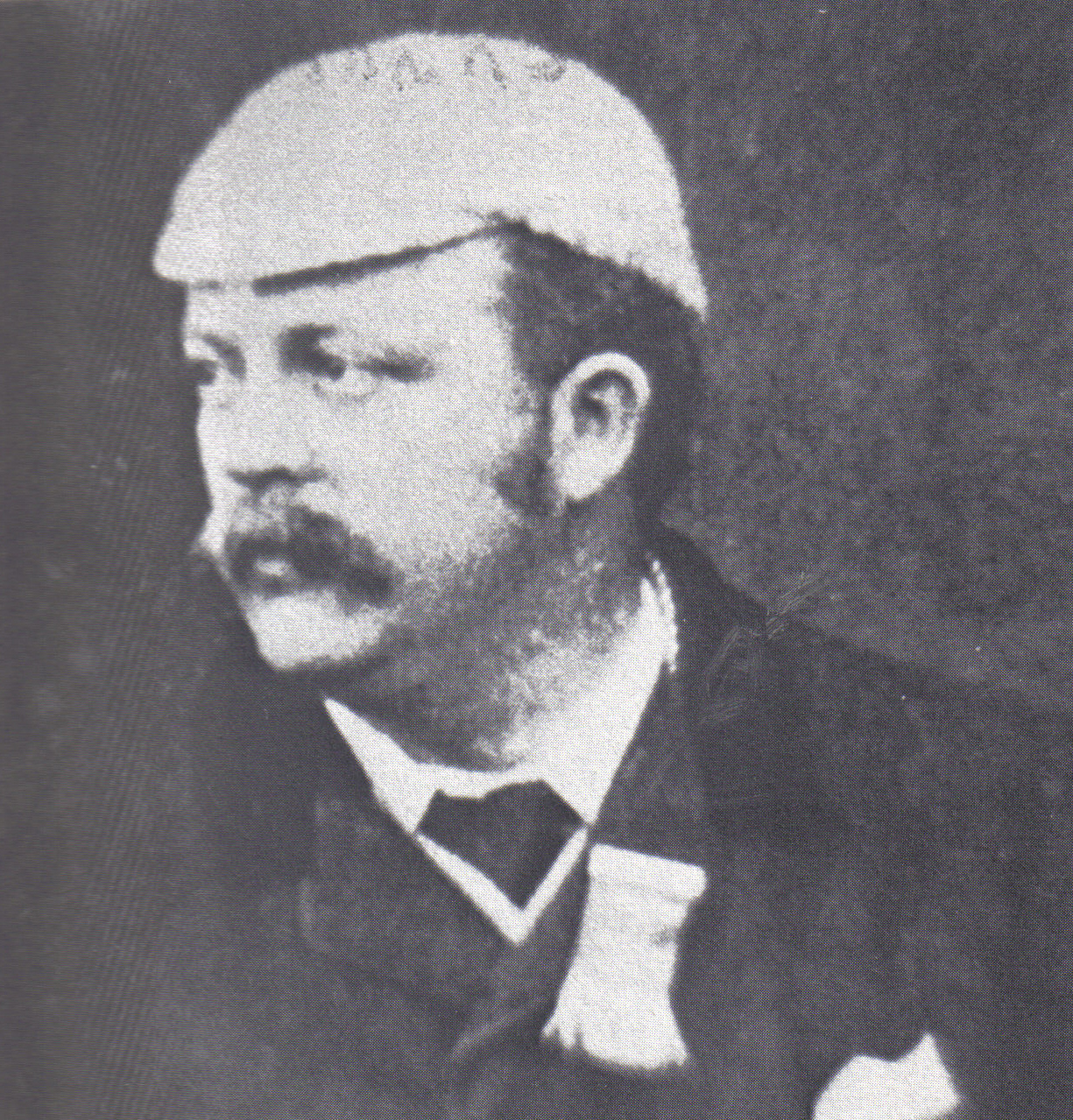
- Full name: Richard Mullock
- Born: 3 May 1851; Newport, Wales
- Died: 1920 (aged 68–69)

Richard Mullock (3 May 1851 – 1920) was a Welsh sporting administrator and official, who is most notable for organising the first Welsh rugby union international game and was instrumental in the creation of the Welsh Football Union, which became the Welsh Rugby Union in 1934. Mullock came from an Anglo-Irish family; his family's firm in Wales, Henry Mullock & Son, was a printers based on Commercial Street in Newport, South Wales.

== Early sporting ambitions ==
Mullock had a history of connections with sports clubs around Newport and in 1874 became the secretary of the Newport Athletic Club. In 1879 the South Wales Football Club, which represented the interests of Welsh rugby union, attempted to organise a group of matches between a South Wales team and clubs representing Blackheath F.C., West of Scotland F.C., Oxford University and the South of Ireland. Mullock, wishing to improve the profile of his Newport club, secured a match against Blackheath before the S.W.F.C. could finalise any arrangements, stealing their fixture. Oxford University and West of Scotland lost interest in a match with either organisation, while a team from South of Ireland played a match against Newport on 18 November 1879, a day before the match with the S.W.F.U. By 1880 the S.W.F.U. was losing face as a governing body, with teams pulling out of matches after embarrassing fixture clashes and a lack of firm commitments.

== The creation of a Welsh national team ==
A meeting was held in the Tenby Hotel in Swansea in 1880, organised between rugby union clubs in an attempt to produce a representative team to face the English national team. Little was gained from the meeting, but it did produce an agreed desire from the parties present to meet with the English Rugby Football Union to arrange a match between Wales and England. Mullock became the architect of this movement and it was through him that the RFU arranged a fixture with a Welsh team on 8 January 1881. Mullock arranged a set of trials in December 1880 to choose the team that would face England, to be captained by Cambridge University player James Bevan.

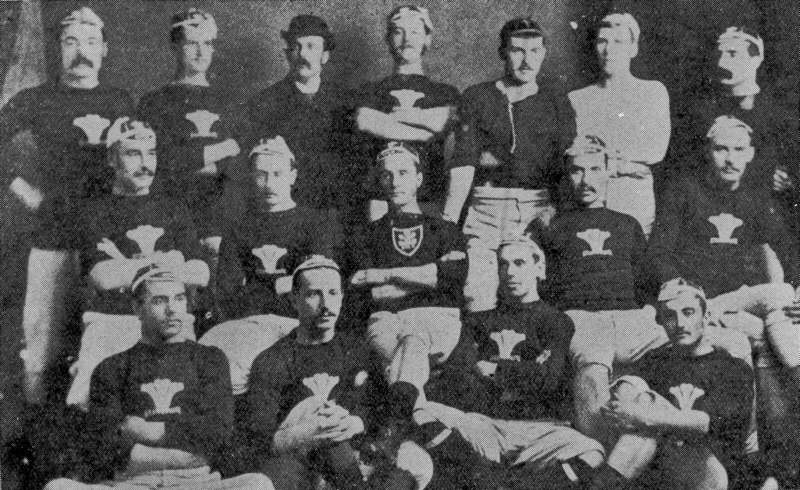
Mullock (back row in bowler hat) with the first Welsh team, 1881

The selection performance of the first Welsh team was contentious, with Mullock choosing a geographically varied team of educated men, most of whom most were linked to the older colleges. The original date of 8 January was postponed to 22 January, which in turn was cancelled due to frost. Mullock was concerned that the lack of a fixture date would lead towards the same accusations of incompetence levelled at the S.W.F.U., and accepted a date of 19 February even though it fell a day before a cup semi-final between Swansea and Llanelli. On the day of the match two of the players chosen to represent Wales failed to show for the game. The missing players later complained that there was little definite communication between Mullock and themselves.

The match itself was a one sided affair, with the English winning by a score of 8–0, through seven goals, a dropped goal and six tries to nil. This was a terrible defeat for the Welsh and when the backlash came from the press, Mullock discovered that he was the only Welsh executive and was carrying the responsibility for the defeat. The Western Mail ran several editorials asking whether the match was an affiliated team endorsed by the S.W.F.U. or a private team organised by Mullock. The S.W.F.U. distanced themselves from the match, allowing the responsibility to fall on Mullock; though this tactic was ill conceived, as the rugby clubs appeared to prefer Mullock's positive approach rather than the S.W.F.U.'s inactivity. These events led to the formation of the Welsh Football Union, later to be named the Welsh Rugby Union, at the Castle Hotel in Neath on 12 March 1881. The S.W.F.U. failed to attend the meeting, which led to their dissolution as the WFU was accepted as the official representative union of the Welsh clubs.

== Secretary of the Welsh Football Union ==
The four major Welsh clubs, Cardiff, Swansea, Newport and Llanelli were all in favour of the new direction Mullock was taking rugby in Wales and gave their support to the formation of the WFU. Swansea in particular were impressed with Mullock and commended him for his organisation of the Welsh team, despite the heavy defeat. At the meeting, with the support of Swansea, Mullock was installed as the first secretary of the Welsh Football Union, who in turn proposed Swansea's Cyril Chambers as president. By September 1882, Mullock was not only the WFU secretary and treasurer, but was installed as one of the four regional selectors for the Welsh national team, representing the Newport area.

Mullock, although enthusiastic as a sporting organiser was a poor accountant, and a bad choice for treasurer. At the end of the 1882–3 season, the Union had received roughly £96 in receipts, but had spent over £215, roughly a quarter of this amount spent on hotel bills attempting to impress RFU delegates. It was Mullock's poor fiscal abilities that would later remove him from his posts within the WFU. In 1891 at Llanelli's AGM, the club secretary, Gavin Henry, stated that after the 1891 Home Nations match at Stradey Park, where Wales faced Ireland, Mullock had taken the gate receipts without paying Llanelli's costs. Henry wrote several letters to Mullock but did not receive a response, resulting in Henry meeting the costs himself. Henry called for Mullock to be 'deposed' from his position within the WFU.

At the 1890-1 WFU annual meeting, Swansea's William Gwynn, challenged Mullock's position and demanded that he step down on the grounds of financial mismanagement. While Tom Williams of Neath complained that Mullock, as treasurer, had not provided a balance sheet for members since 1884. Gwynn called for Mullock to be replaced as Secretary by Walter E. Rees; but Rees withdrew after W.D. Phillips and Horace Lyne argued Mullock's case, reminding the members how Mullock financed the Union in its early years. Mullock retained his position as Secretary but stood down as Treasurer in favour of William Wilkins.

The next season saw the end of Mullock as WFU Secretary; when an incident involving a Swansea player in a game at Exeter, resulted in a request by the RFU for the player concerned to write a letter of apology. Many WFU members felt that Mullock had grovelled towards the RFU during the affair and in September 1892, Mullock was no longer Secretary.

== As rugby referee ==
Mullock also officiated for rugby union matches, and was umpire in several international matches, including the 1884 Home Nations Championship clash between Scotland and Wales. His opposite partner on the line at the same game was JA Gardener, secretary of the Scottish Rugby Union and the referee was James MacLaren, President of the RFU.

In 1886 as part of the Home Nations Championship, Mullock was selected to referee an international game between England and Ireland. This followed on from the previous year when Horace Lyne had refereed the same fixture between the nations. England won both matches by a try, and the fact that two members of the WFU were seen to have 'had a hand' in Irish defeats caused an already strained relationship between Wales and Ireland to worsen. In both the 1885 and 1886 Championships, Ireland refused to play Wales.

== Personal history ==
Mullock was born in 1851 in Newport, South Wales to Henry Mullock and Henrietta Oliver. The family ran a printing company and published the local paper, The Newport Advertiser. Mullock was one of at least four siblings, including younger brother William and sisters Julia and Helen. Mullock married and had six children, though apart from a daughter, Dorothy, there is little information on his family.

In 1893 the affairs off Mullock became public as he strived to fight off bankruptcy orders, with the local courts deeming him £2,000 in debt. In 1902, Mullock was declared bankrupt and emigrated that year to Africa. He died in 1920.

== Bibliography ==
- Godwin, Terry (1984). The International Rugby Championship 1883–1983. London: Willows Books. ISBN 0-00-218060-X.
- Smith, David; Williams, Gareth (1980). Fields of Praise: The Official History of The Welsh Rugby Union. Cardiff: University of Wales Press. ISBN 0-7083-0766-3.
