= 1931–32 South Africa rugby union tour of Britain and Ireland =

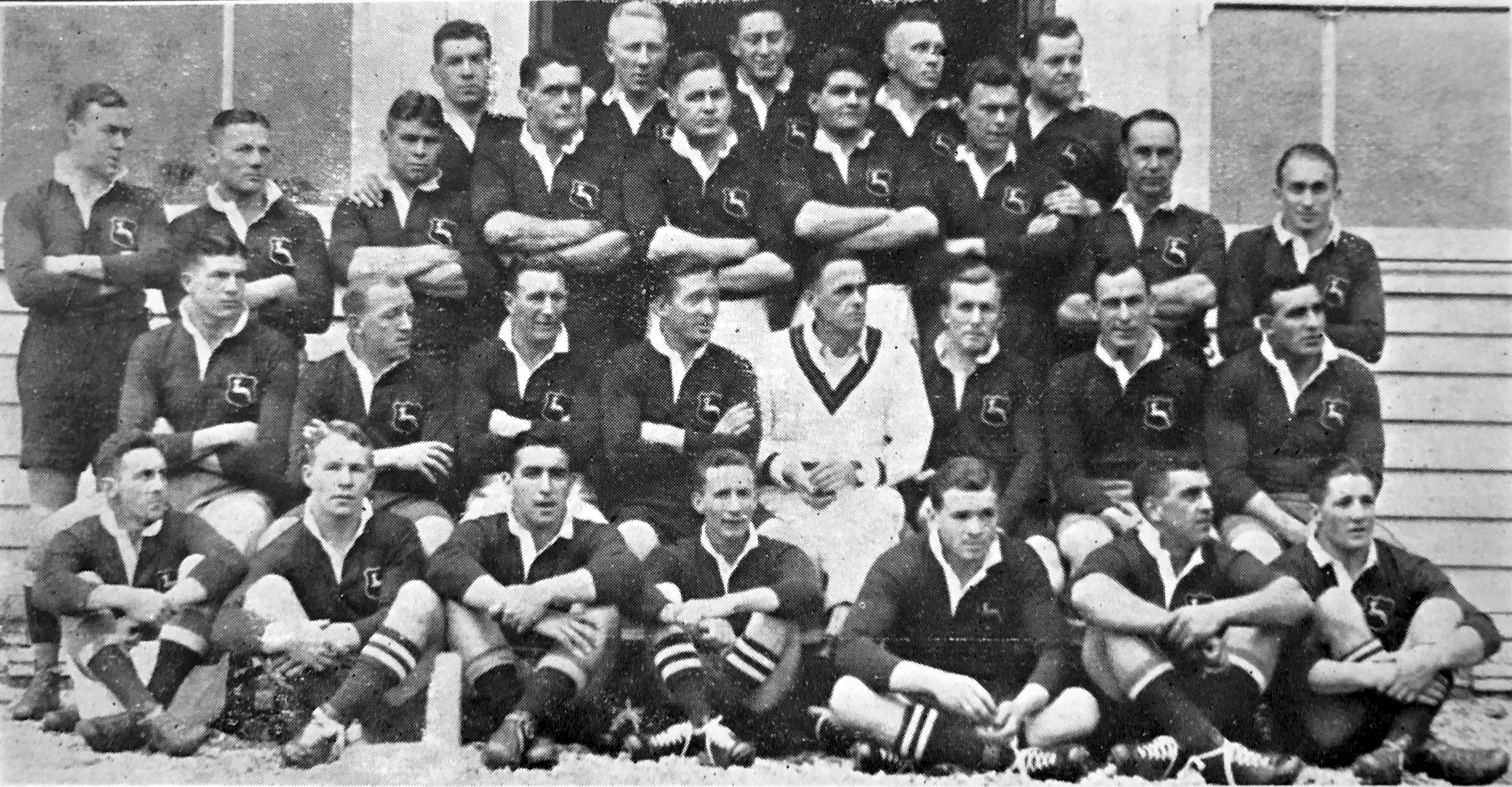
- The touring squad
Summary
P	W	D	L
Total
26	23	2	1
Test match
4	4	0	0
Opponent
P	W	D	L
Wales
1	1	0	0
Ireland
1	1	0	0
England
1	1	0	0
Scotland
1	1	0	0

The 1931–32 South Africa tour of Britain and Ireland was a collection of friendly rugby union games undertaken by the South Africa national team against the four British Home Nation teams. The tour also took in several matches against British and Irish club, county and invitational teams. This was the fourth South Africa tour and the third tour of the Northern Hemisphere.

The tour was extremely successful for the South Africans, as the team only lost a single match. In the tests played the team beat all four home nations. The only team to beat the Springboks was the invitational East Midlands county team. The final tour record saw 26 matches played, with South Africa winning 23, losing one and drawing two.

== Criticism of playing style ==
Although very successful on the pitch, the touring South Africans were unloved by their hosts and the press back home. Bennie Osler, the South African captain, introduced a style of play which centred on a continual kicking game; either into touch in an attempt to support his large pack or diagonally across the pitch for his wings to chase. This was seen by many critics of the time as 10-man tactics, with the backs taken out of the match, and thus the entertainment brought by previous South African tours removed.

Welsh journalist 'Old Stager' stated "The Africans, by adherence to ten-man rugby, are winning their matches, but are not capturing the hearts and the imagination of rugby followers...". O.L. Owen in his History of the RFU concurred with these thoughts, "The least spectacular and, so far as back play was concerned, the most disappointing of the South African touring sides..."

== Results ==
	Date	Opponent	Location	Result	Score
Match 1		Gloucester and Somerset	Bristol	Won	14–3
Match 2	8 October	Newport RFC	Rodney Parade, Newport	Won	15–3
Match 3	10 October	Swansea RFC	St Helens, Swansea	Won	10–3
Match 4	14 October	Abertillery and Cross Keys	Abertillery Park, Abertillery	Won	10–9
Match 5		London	Twickenham, London	Won	30–3
Match 6		Midland Counties	Villa Park, Birmingham	Won	13–3
Match 7		Durham and Northumberland	Roker Park, Sunderland	Won	41–0
Match 8	28 October	Glasgow	Anniesland	Won	21–13
Match 9	31 October	South of Scotland	Melrose, Scotland	Drawn	0–0
Match 10		Cambridge University	Cambridge	Won	21–9
Match 11		Combined Services	Twickenham, London	Won	23–0
Match 12		Oxford University	Oxford	Won	24–3
Match 13	14 November	Leicestershire and East Midlands	Welford Road, Leicester	Lost	21–30
Match 14		Devon and Cornwall	Devonport	Drawn	3–3
Match 15	21 November	Cardiff	Cardiff Arms Park, Cardiff	Won	13–5
Match 16	24 November	Llanelli	Stradey Park, Llanelli	Won	9–0
Match 17	28 November	Neath and Aberavon	The Gnoll, Neath	Won	8–3
Match 18	5 December	Wales	St Helens, Swansea	Won	8–3
Match 19		Lancashire and Cheshire	Waterloo	Won	20–9
Match 20		Ulster	Ravenhill, Belfast	Won	30–3
Match 21	19 December	Ireland	Dublin	Won	8–3
Match 22		London	Twickenham, London	Won	16–8
Match 23	2 January 1932	England	Twickenham, London	Won	7–0
Match 24		Cumberland and Yorkshire	Workington	Won	27–5
Match 25	9 January 1932	North of Scotland	Aberdeen	Won	9–0
Match 26	16 January 1932	Scotland	Murrayfield, Edinburgh	Won	6–3

== Touring party ==
=== Management ===
- Manager: Theo Pienaar
- Captain: Bennie Osler

=== Full backs ===
- Gerry Brand (Western Province)
- Jackie Tindall (Western Province)

=== Three-quarters ===
- Geoff Gray (Western Province)
- Jock van Niekerk (Western Province)
- Floors Venter (Transvaal)
- Frank Waring (Western Province)
- JC van der Westhuizen (Western Province)
- JH van der Westhuizen (Western Province)
- Jimmy White (Border)
- M Zimerman (Western Province)

=== Half backs ===
- Danie Craven (Western Province)
- Murray "Tiny" Francis (Orange Free State)
- Bennie Osler (Western Province)
- P. de Villiers (Western Province)

=== Forwards ===
- W.F. Bergh (South Western Districts)
- J.N. Bierman (Transvaal)
- George Daneel (Transvaal)
- John Dold (Eastern Province)
- H.M. Forrest (Transvaal)
- Manie Geere (Transvaal)
- Bert Kipling (Griqualand West)
- Matthys "Boy" Louw (Western Province)
- S.C. Louw (Western Province)
- J.A.J. McDonald (Western Province)
- Albertus Viljoen van der Merwe (Western Province)
- P.J. Mostert (Western Province)
- Philip Nel (Natal)
- L.C. Strachan (Transvaal)
- S.R. du Toit (Western Province)

== The matches ==
=== Newport ===
8 October 1931

Newport	3–15	South Africa
Try: Richards		Try: Zimerman; SC Louw van der Merwe; Osler; Pen: Brand

Rodney Parade
Attendance: 70,000
Referee: RW Barry (Wales) (Cardiff)

Newport: WA Everson, Jack Morley (capt.), K Richards, JR Edwards, K Watkins, Dicky Ralph, R Tovey, JC Slade, J Hughes, JA Addison, Harry Peacock, R Newton, DA Jones, P Hordern, Sam Danahar

South Africa: GH Brand, M Zimerman, JH van der Westhuizen, JC van der Westhuizen, FW Wearing, BL Osler, P de Villiers, MM Louw, PJ Mostert, SC Louw, JN Bierman, SR du Toit, PJ Nel, AJ van der Merwe, GM Daneel

=== Swansea ===
10 October 1931

Swansea	3–10	South Africa
Try: Davey		Try: Brand; JC van der Westhuizen; Con: Brand

St Helens
Attendance: 40,000
Referee: TH Phillips (Wales) (Pontypridd)

Swansea: Iorrie Herbert, Rhys Evans, Jack Rees (capt.), Claude Davey, Jim Dark, Dennis Manley, Idwal Rees, Bryn Evans, Tom Day, Glyn Jones, Gwynfor Lewis, Dai Thomas, Will Davies, Joe White, Edgar Long

South Africa: JC Tindall, JH van der Westhuizen, JC van der Westhuizen (capt.), FW Wearing, GH Brand, MG Francis, DH Craven, MM Louw, HG Kipling, SC Louw, AJ van der Merwe, V Geere, HM Forrest, GM Daneel, JAJ McDonald

=== Abertillery and Cross Keys ===
14 October 1931

Abertillery and Cross Keys	9–10	South Africa
Try: Thomas (2); Pen: O'Neill		Try: Du Toit van der Merwe; Con: Osler (2)

Abertillery Park
Attendance: 25,000
Referee: WJ Llewellyn (Wales) (Bridgend)

Abertillery/Cross Keys: Jimmy O'Neill (Abertillery) (capt.), Jim Bird (Abertillery), George Thompson (Cross Keys), Gerald Lewis (Cross Keys), JR Davies (Cross Keys), Syd Watkins (Cross Keys), Albert Hockey (Abertillery), Mel Meek (Abertillery), Lonza Bowdler (Cross Keys), Ken Salmon (Cross Keys), Steve Morris (Cross Keys), Trevor Thomas (Abertillery), Eddie Lloyd (Abertillery), RT Probert (Cross Keys), Albert Fear (Abertillery)

South Africa: JC Tindall, JH van der Westhuizen, BG Gray, J White, M Zimmerman, BL Osler (capt.), DH Craven, PJ Mostert, HG Kipling, SR du Toit, V Geere, PJ Nel, LC Strachan, JB Dold, AJ van der Merwe

=== Glasgow ===
28 October 1931

Glasgow District	13–21	South Africa
Try: Nicholson; Murdoch; Con Shaw; Scott; Pen Scott	Report	Try: Zimmerman (2); Louw; Venter; Con: Brand (3); Pen Brand

Old Anniesland
Attendance: 12,000
Referee: JFC Moffat (Scotland)

=== Leicestershire and East Midlands ===
14 November 1931

Leicestershire and East Midlands	30-21	South Africa
Try: Slow (2); Hardwicke; Beamish; Buckingham; Cons: Weston (4); Pen: Weston; Drop Goal: Slow		Try: Zimmerman (4); Gray; Con: Francis; Drop Goal: Francis

Welford Road
Attendance: 25,000

Leicestershire and East Midlands:Bobby Barr (Leicester); Jeff Hardwicke (Leicester), Ralph Buckingham (Leicester), Charlie Brumwell (Bedford), Len Ashwell (Bedford); Charles Slow (Northampton), Bernard Gadney (Leicester); Henry Greenwood (Leicester), Doug Norman (Leicester), Ray Longland (Northampton), Thomas Harris (Northampton), Anthony Roncoroni (West Herts), Bill Weston (Northampton), George Beamish (Leicester), Eric Coley (Northampton)
South Africa: Tindall; Venter, van der Westhuizen, Gray, Zimmerman; Francis, Craven; Louw, Mostert, du Toit, Nel, Strachan, Bierman, Dold, Daneel

=== Cardiff ===
21 November 1931

Cardiff	5–13	South Africa
Try: Boon; Con: Stone		Try: Zimerman; Gray; McDonald; Con: Brand (2)

Cardiff Arms Park
Attendance: 34,000
Referee: WH Harris (Wales) (Risca)

Cardiff: Tommy Stone, Ronnie Boon, Graham Jones, Bernard Turnbull, John Roberts, Harry Bowcott (capt.), Maurice Turnbull, Tom Lewis, Don Tarr, Tom Gadd, Archie Skym, Viv Osmond, Colin Ross, Bob Barrell, Iorrie Isaacs

South Africa: GH Brand, M Zimerman, BG Gray, JC van der Westhuizen, DO Williams, BL Osler (capt.), P de Villiers, MM Louw, PJ Mostert, SR du Toit, AJ van der Merwe, WF Bergh, V Geere, JN Bierman, JAJ McDonald

=== Llanelli ===
24 November 1931

Llanelli	0–9	South Africa
Try:		Try: van der Westhuizen; Gray; Williams

Stradey Park
Referee: Albert Freethy (Wales) (Neath)

Llanelli: Bryn Howells, Wattie Lewis, Sid Howells, Tom Evans, Horace Fairhurst, Dai John, Bert Jones, Bryn Evans, Jack Williams, Edgar Jones, Cliff Treharne, Alf Parker, Will Lang, Jim Lang, Ivor Jones (capt.)

South Africa: GH Brand, DO Williams, BG Gray, JH van der Westhuizen, FW Waring, MM Louw (capt.), DH Craven, MG Francis, HG Kipling, V Geere, GM Daneel, PJ Nel, WF Bergh, JN Bierman, LC Strachan

=== Neath and Aberavon ===
28 November 1931

Neath & Aberavon	3–8	South Africa
Try: Hopkins		Try: Mostert; Con: Osler; Pen: Osler

The Gnoll
Attendance: 20,000
Referee: J Megins (Wales) (Pontyclun)

Neath & Aberavon: Phil Lloyd (Neath), Dan Jones (Neath), Glyn Daniels (Neath), Gwyn Moore (Neath), Fred Nicholas (Aberavon), Wilf Selby (Aberavon), Tal Harris (Aberavon), Tom Arthur (Neath), Miah McGrath (Aberavon), Ned Jenkins (Aberavon), Walter Vickery (Aberavon), Gordon Hopkins (Neath), Arthur Lemon (Neath), Cyril Griffiths (Aberavon) (Capt.), Glyn Prosser (Neath)

South Africa: JC Tindall, M Zimerman, J White, JC van der Westhuizen, FD Venter, BL Osler (capt.), DH Craven, SR du Toit, HG Kipling, PJ Mostert, AJ van der Merwe, PJ Nel, WF Bergh, JB Dold, JAJ McDonald

=== Wales ===
5 December 1931

Wales	3–8	South Africa
Try: Davies		Try: Daneel; Bergh; Con: Osler

St Helens
Attendance: 70,000
Referee: E. Holmes (England)

Wales: Jack Bassett (Penarth) (capt.), Jack Morley (Newport), Claude Davey (Swansea), Frank Williams (Cardiff), Ronnie Boon (Cardiff), Dicky Ralph (Newport), Wick Powell (London Welsh), Tom Day (Swansea), Lonza Bowdler, (Cross Keys), Archie Skym (Cardiff), Ned Jenkins (Aberavon), Tom Arthur (Neath), Arthur Lemon (Neath), Watcyn Thomas (Swansea), Will Davies (Swansea)

South Africa: GH Brand, M Zimerman, BG Gray, J White, FD Ventor, DH Craven, PJ Mostert, BL Osler (capt.), HG Kipling, MM Louw, AJ van der Marwe, WF Bergh, PJ Nel, GM Daneel, JAJ McDonald

=== Ireland ===
19 December 1931

Ireland	3–8	South Africa
Pen: McMahon		Try: Waring; Zimerman; Con: Osler

Lansdowne Road
Attendance: 35,000

Ireland: Major Egan, Ned Lightfoot, Eugene Davy, Morgan Crowe, Jack Arigho, Laurence McMahon, Paul Murray, Hal Withers, Victor Pike, Jimmy Farrell, Jack Russell, Jack Siggins, Noel Murphy, George Beamish (c), Jammie Clinch

South Africa: Gerry Brand, Morris Zimerman, Franky Waring, C van der Westhuizen, Ponie van der Westhuizen, Bennie Osler (c), Danie Craven, Boy Louw, Bert Kipling, Phil Mostert, Flip Nel, Ferdie Bergh, Nick Bierman, Andre McDonald, George Daneel

=== England ===
2 January 1932

England	0–7	South Africa
		Try: Bergh; Drop: Brand

Twickenham
Attendance: 70,000

=== Scotland ===
16 January 1932

Scotland	3–6	South Africa
Try: Lind		Try: Osler; Craven

Murrayfield
Attendance: 65,000

== Bibliography ==
- Billot, John (1974). Springboks in Wales. Ferndale: Ron Jones Publications.
- Smith, David; Williams, Gareth (1980). Fields of Praise: The Official History of The Welsh Rugby Union. Cardiff: University of Wales Press. ISBN 0-7083-0766-3.
