= Frank Williams (rugby union, born 1910) =

Wales international rugby union player

- Born: Frank Llewellyn Williams; 26 January 1910 Cardiff, Wales
- Died: 7 July 1959 (aged 49) Tamworth, England
- School: Cardiff High School
- University: Brecon College
- Occupation: Teacher

Rugby union career
- Position: Centre
Amateur team(s)
| Years | Team | Apps | (Points) |
| 1926-1929 | Cardiff RFC | | |
| 1929-? | Wakefield | | |
| 1929-? | Headingley | | |
| 1930-1931 | Barbarian F. C. | | |
International career
| Years | Team | Apps | (Points) |
| 1929–1933 | Wales | 14 | (6) |

Frank L Williams (26 January 1910 – 7 July 1959) was a Welsh international rugby union centre for Wales who played club rugby for Cardiff, Wakefield and Headingley. Williams was a solid defensive player, who not only tackled well but was also unafraid to cover a grounded ball and accepted the punishment meted out.

== Rugby career ==
Williams was first selected for Wales on 2 February 1929 in a game against Scotland at St Helens. Wales won 14-7, ending a run of four consecutive home defeats by Scotland. Williams was reselected in Wales's next two games, a victory over France and a trip to Ireland for the final game of the 1929 Championship. Williams was among the majority of the Welsh players to wake up feeling ill on the morning of the Ireland game, with only tee-totalers Morley and Peacock unaffected. Ireland took an early lead in a brutal, defensive encounter. Williams managed to break through the Irish defence to score his first international try, which Dai Parker converted to give Wales a draw.

In 1929 Williams was appointed as the sports master of Wakefield Grammar School in Yorkshire, and played the rest of his club career in Yorkshire, playing club rugby for Wakefield and Headingley and county rugby for the Yorkshire XV. Williams continued to represent Wales, turning out for all four matches in the 1930 Five Nations Championship, in which Wales finished second, losing to Scotland and England and beating Ireland and France. In the same year Williams was offered a position in the 1930 British Lions tour, but turned down the invitation.

Williams was back in the Wales squad for the 1931 Championship, though he missed the first two games against England and Scotland. In the match against France he linked up with Claude Davey and Dicky Ralph to form a strong midfield triangle which overran the French. Wales scored seven tries, with Williams scoring his second try for his country. In the final match of the tournament Wales beat Ireland 15-3 and won the Five Nations Championship.

At the end of the 1930/31 season, Williams was chosen to tour south Wales with the Barbarians. It was a very successful set of matches for the invitational Baa-Baas, winning all their matches in south Wales for the first time. At the end of 1931, the touring South Africans arrived in Britain and Williams faced them twice. Williams was on the losing side twice, firstly for Wales in December, and then as part of a joint Yorkshire/Cumberland team in January the next year.

=== International matches played ===
Wales

- England 1930, 1932
- France 1929, 1930, 1931
- Ireland 1929, 1930, 1931, 1932, 1933
- Scotland 1929, 1930, 1932
- South Africa 1931

== Bibliography ==
- Billot, John (1974). Springboks in Wales. Ferndale: Ron Jones Publications.
- Goodwin, Terry (1984). The International Rugby Championship 1883-1983. London: Willows Books. ISBN 0-00-218060-X.
- Smith, David; Williams, Gareth (1980). Fields of Praise: The Official History of The Welsh Rugby Union. Cardiff: University of Wales Press. ISBN 0-7083-0766-3.
- Thomas, Wayne (1979). A Century of Welsh Rugby Players. Ansells Ltd.
