= Don Tarr =

Wales international rugby union player

- Born: Donald James Tarr; 11 March 1910 Llandeilo Fawr, Carmarthenshire, Wales
- Died: 4 June 1980 (aged 70) Fareham, England
- School: Amman Valley Grammar
- Occupation: Naval officer

Rugby union career
- Position: Hooker
Amateur team(s)
Years	Team	Apps	(Points)
1931-1932	Cardiff RFC	31	
1933-?	Swansea RFC		
1934-1935	Barbarian F.C.		
- Hampshire
- Royal Navy
International career
Years	Team	Apps	(Points)
1935	Wales	1	(0)

Donald James Tarr (11 March 1910 – 4 June 1980) was a Welsh international hooker who played club rugby for Swansea and Cardiff, county rugby for Hampshire and invitational rugby for the Barbarians. Tarr was a career naval officer, reaching the rank of Lieutenant Commander in the Royal Navy.

== Rugby career ==
Tarr began his rugby career as a school boy, representing the Welsh Secondary Schools team. In the 1927 secondary school game against France, Tarr was one of seven Welsh players that would later represent their country at senior level. Tarr joined Cardiff in 1931 and soon found himself in the squad to face the touring South African team. In 1933 Tarr joined Swansea alongside one of his school boys teammates, Claude Davey, and both lined up for Swansea against the touring New Zealand team in 1935. Both men were last minute substitutes, as Tarr was a replacement for the injured Tom Day and Davey was brought from Sale to cover for Idwal Rees. When Swansea beat the All Blacks, they became the first club team to beat all three major Southern Hemisphere teams. Tarr would face the same touring All Blacks another two times at club level; the Combined Services team at Aldershot and a joint Hampshire/Sussex county team.

Later in 1935, Tarr was selected to face the same touring New Zealand team, but this time for Wales. This was Tarr's one and only cap for the senior team because of an injury so serious that rugby journalist Huw Richards would say in 2010 that Tarr "probably came closer to dying on the pitch than anyone else ever has in an international match." With ten minutes of the match remaining, a loose scrum broke up to reveal Tarr laying motionless on the ground, and the referee, Cyril Gadney, called for a stretcher. Gadney ensured no-one moved Tarr before medical aid arrived and Tarr was lifted still face down onto the stretcher and was removed from the pitch. This action is thought to have saved his life as Tarr had suffered a broken neck. Although Wales were 12-10 down at the time, and now a man light, they recovered strongly and after Rees-Jones scored a try, Idwal Rees kept a strong defence to allow Wales a 13–12 victory.

Tarr's injury kept him from ever playing again for Wales, although he is recorded to have played one match post-injury for Ammanford. In a coincidence, his opposite number at hooker in his only appearance for Wales, Bill Hadley, was born on the same day as Tarr.

=== International matches played ===
Wales

- New Zealand 1935

== Bibliography ==
- Billot, John (1972). All Blacks in Wales. Ferndale: Ron Jones Publications.
- Billot, John (1974). Springboks in Wales. Ferndale: Ron Jones Publications.
- Smith, David; Williams, Gareth (1980). Fields of Praise: The Official History of The Welsh Rugby Union. Cardiff: University of Wales Press. ISBN 0-7083-0766-3.
