= Will Davies (rugby union) =

Wales international rugby union footballer

- Born: William Davies; 14 February 1906 Cwmgors, Wales
- Died: 5 October 1975 (aged 69) Cwmgors, Wales

Rugby union career
- Position: Flanker
Amateur team(s)
Years	Team	Apps	(Points)
1928–?	Swansea RFC		
International career
Years	Team	Apps	(Points)
1931–1932	Wales	4	(3)

William Davies (14 February 1906 – 5 October 1975), known more commonly as "Sgili", was a Wales international rugby union player who played club rugby for Swansea. He won four caps for Wales and was part of the Welsh side that faced the touring South Africans in 1931.

Davies was originally a rugby scrum-half and centre, before moving into the forward, and eventually settling as a flanker. He faced the South Africans twice during their 1931 tour of Britain, once with Wales and once with Swansea. In the Swansea game, Davies set up his team's only score when he snapped up a loose ball, that broke loose after a South African tackle. He punted the ball forward for Claude Davey to beat the covering Springbok players to collect it and score a try.

== International rugby ==
Davies was first selected for Wales to face the South Africans in 1931 and although Wales lost the match 8–3, Davies scored the only Welsh points with a try. Davies showed considerable skill and maturity in a debut game when he timed his move on a loose ball to pick the correct bounce to kick the ball forward and then successfully chase it over the line. Davies was back in the 1932 Home Nations Championship and was chosen to play against England at St Helens. Under the captaincy of Jack Bassett, Wales won the game 12–5, and three weeks later was chosen to face Scotland. His final game for Wales was against Ireland in a Championship decider that was lost when the normally dependable Jack Bassett missed the game's final conversion.

=== International matches played ===
Wales

- England 1932
- Ireland 1932
- Scotland 1932
- South Africa 1931

== Bibliography ==
- Billot, John (1974). Springboks in Wales. Ferndale: Ron Jones Publications.
- Smith, David; Williams, Gareth (1980). Fields of Praise: The Official History of The Welsh Rugby Union. Cardiff: University of Wales Press. ISBN 0-7083-0766-3.
