= JC van der Westhuizen =

South African rugby union player (1905–2003)

- Full name: Jacobus Cloete van der Westhuizen
- Born: 22 November 1905 Darling, South Africa
- Died: 8 July 2003 (aged 97)
- Height: 1.71 m (5 ft 7 in)
- Weight: 73.9 kg (163 lb)
- School: Paarl Gimnasium
- University: Stellenbosch University
- Notable relative: Ponie van der Westhuizen (brother)
- Occupation: Schoolmaster

Rugby union career
- Position: Centre
Provincial / State sides
Years	Team	Apps	(Points)
- Western Province
- Eastern Province
International career
Years	Team	Apps	(Points)
1928–31	South Africa	4	(3)

Jacobus Cloete van der Westhuizen (22 November 1905 – 8 July 2003), known as JC van der Westhuizen, was a South African international rugby union player.

== Biography ==
=== Early life ===
Born in Darling, north of Cape Town, van der Westhuizen grew up playing local inter-town fixtures and later as a pupil at Paarl Gimnasium, where he was boarder. He then had five years with Stellenbosch University.

=== Rugby career ===
A centre, van der Westhuizen captained Cape Town club Gardens and was a surprise Springboks call up for their 1928 home series against the All Blacks, having not yet represented his province. He got his opportunity through an injury to Stanley Osler and featured in three of the four international fixtures, scoring a try at Newlands. In 1931, van der Westhuizen got recalled for the tour of the British Isles and was named as Bennie Osler's vice captain. Injuries restricted him to a solitary Test match against Ireland at Lansdowne Road. He later captained Eastern Province while serving as the headmaster of Balfour Secondary School.

== See also ==
- List of South Africa national rugby union players
