= Cwmgors RFC =

Welsh rugby union club, based in Cwmgors

(Wales) Cwmgors RFC
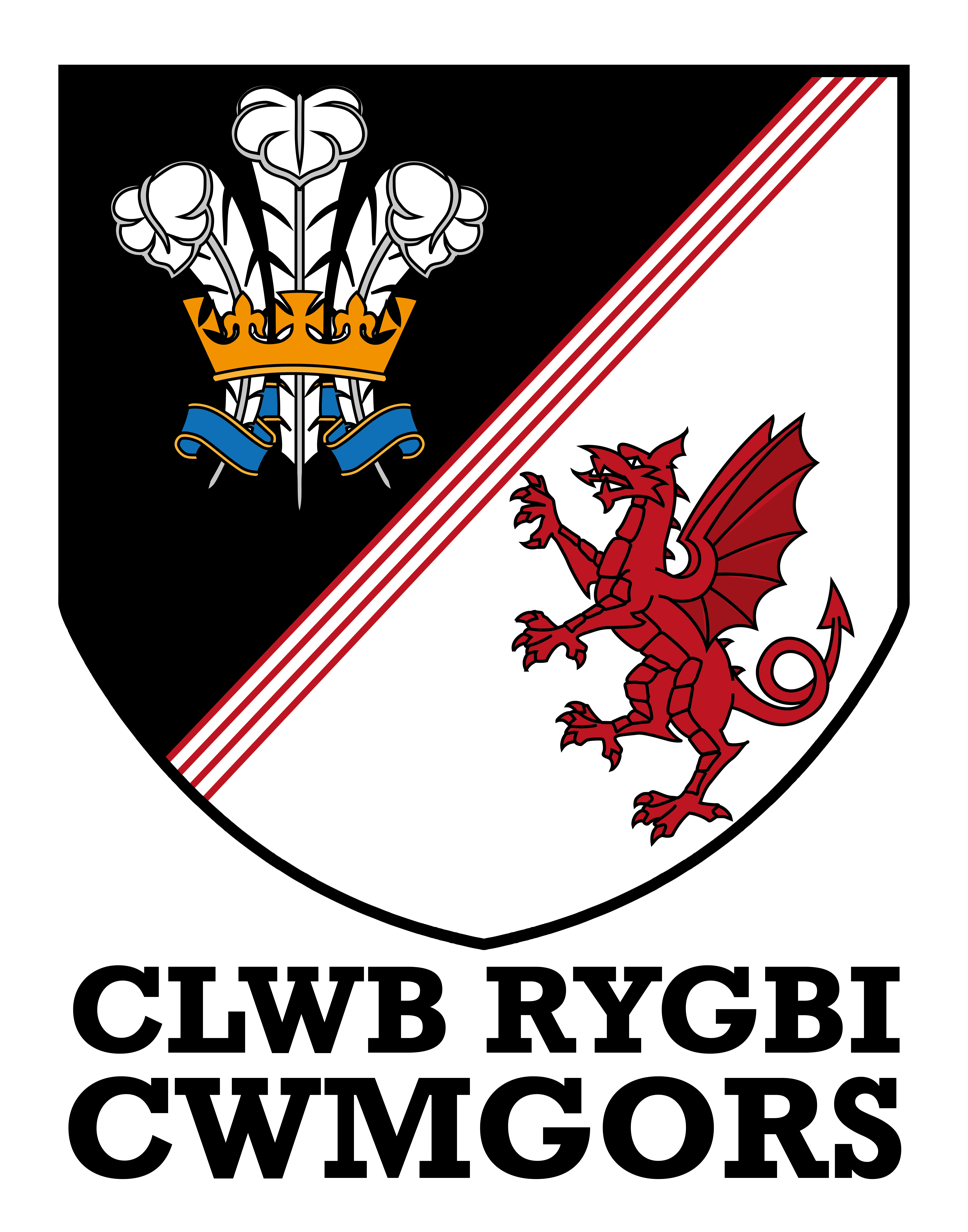
- Badge of Clwb Rygbi Cwmgors (Cwmgors RFC)
- Full name: Clwb Rygbi Cwmgors
- Nickname: The Cherries
- Founded: 1927
- Location: Cwmgors, Wales
- Ground(s): Parc-y-Werin, Gwaun-Cae-Gurwen
- President: Sir Gareth Edwards
- Coach(es): Gareth Davies, Dylan Richards
- Captain: Jordan Smith
- League: WRU Division 4 West Central
- 2024/25: 8th
1st kit	2nd kit

Official website
- www.cwmgorsrfc.co.uk

Clwb Rygbi Cwmgors (English: Cwmgors RFC) is a rugby union club that represents the villages of Cwmgors, Gwaun-Cae-Gurwen and Tairgwaith, South West Wales. The area is in the principal area of Neath Port Talbot but close to the boundaries with Carmarthenshire and Powys. They play in the Admiral National League, Division 4 West Central for the 2024/25 season. The team is known as The Cherries or occasionally the Cherry Bee’s in reference to their cherry and white home kit colours.

Cwmgors RFC was officially founded in 1927, and has been a member of the Welsh Rugby Union since 1938. Cwmgors is a feeder club for the Ospreys. The club is also affiliated to the Carmarthen County Rugby Union, West Wales Rugby Union, C.C. Evans, and the Swansea and District Rugby Union.

== History ==
1895–1927 Curwen Stars

Although Cwmgors RFC did not come into existence until 1927, rugby had been played in the town from 1895. A team called the All Blacks was formed in the town in 1895; this team later changed its name to the Curwen Stars. The Curwen Stars joined the Llanelli and District Rugby Union in 1900, and eventually joined the Welsh Rugby Union in 1913. In 1923 a second team formed in the village, made up from employees of the Cwmgors Colliery, called the Mond team, named after the owner of the colliery, Alfred Mond. The Mond team included future Welsh captain Claude Davey as one of its players. In 1927 both the Curwen Stars and the Mond disbanded and severed all union connections.

Founding of Cwmgors RFC 1927

During July 1927, former prop of both the Mond Colliery Team and Curwen Stars, David Pritchard, called a meeting by placing notices on street lampposts in Cwmgors, Gwaun-Cae-Gurwen and surrounding areas with aspirations to establish a new rugby club within the village. This received a great response, particularly from the younger members of the community, and it was unanimously decided to form a team named Cwmgors Rugby Football Club, which joined the Swansea and District Rugby Union. David Pritchard was asked to chair the meeting and continued in this role until 1982. During this time the club established its headquarters at the New Star Hotel in Cwmgors.

1930–1940

During the 30s Cwmgors RFC achieved successes: they won the Jim Rapesy Cup, and in 1938 collected their first notable trophy when they won the Swansea and District Challenge Cup. Also in 1938 they gained membership of the Welsh Rugby Union. Notable players during this period include Claude Davey and Will Davies, who both obtained Welsh caps in 1931 and the late 30s, as well as Emrys Evans who gained caps against England, Ireland and Scotland between 1937 and 1939. Another player of this era was Welsh Middleweight boxing champion Tommy Davies, who was also considered a serious contender for the British Middleweight title.

1940–1950

During the 1945/46 season, the club participated in a 7-a-side tournament at Stradey Park, Llanelli. The team reached the semifinals of the tournament, but were knocked out due to an injury resulting in the team having to play with only 6 men. The touring New Zealand Kiwis were one of the teams in the final. Their captain, Sherratt, visited the Cwmgors changing rooms after the tournament to sympathise with the team, as he felt that if they had fielded a full side, they would have reached the final.

During the 1947/48 season, Cwmgors RFC beat a full Llanelli RFC side in what was termed a "missionary match" in tribute to Jess Cole, who was a former Cwmgors RFC player who moved on to play for Llanelli. This match was played at Parc Howard, and Cwmgors proved victorious by 6 points to 3. The Llanelli team included 5 full Welsh Internationals: Peter Rees, Handel Gravelle, Carwyn James, Stan Williams and Ossie Williams.

1950–1960

In 1950 the club changed their home ground from Parc Howard to Parc y Werin, where they continue to play today. They also changed their headquarters from the old public house, the New Star Hotel, to another, the Caegurwen Arms, and also began to use the welfare hall for changing facilities.

During the 1951/52 season, the club reached the West Wales Rugby Union Championship Final against Skewen, but were defeated at the Vadre RFC ground.

A notable Cwmgors player from this decade was Denzil Thomas, who played for Neath and was capped for Wales in 1954. Against Ireland, Denzil kicked the match-winning drop goal, which was the last 4-point drop goal scored for Wales.

1960–1970

The 1969/70 season saw Cwmgors RFC reach the final of the West Wales Challenge Cup against Crynant at the Gnoll Ground, Neath. Cwmgors won by 6 points to nil, the club's first major West Wales Trophy.

1970–1980

Gareth Edwards has been the club's most recent full international player. Edwards was born in Gwaun-Cae-Gurwen and attended the local primary school as well as Pontardawe Technical College. He then went on to Millfield public school and eventually played for Cardiff RFC.

Gareth Edwards became the youngest player to captain Wales during this time, and was also a British Lion as well as a Barbarian. In 2003, in a poll of international rugby players conducted by Rugby World magazine, Edwards was declared the greatest player of all time. He is also Cwmgors RFC's current President.

Until 1980, only three players had scored for Wales against South Africa, including two former Cwmgors players: Gareth Edwards and Will Davies. The other was Cardiff RFC player, Bleddyn Williams.

1990–2000

The 90s saw successes for the club: in 1993/94 they were promoted from Division C West Wales Rugby Football Union to Division 7 of the National Leagues; and in 1995/96, they were champions of Division 7B West of the WRU National Leagues.

In 1994/95 the club's headquarters, the Welfare Hall in Gwaun-Cae-Gurwen was demolished and reconstructed as the current clubhouse after falling into disrepair, with complete internal refurbishments, a new car park and a beer garden, which was formally opened in April 1995. The clubhouse is still used today, and regularly displays entertainment including live music, comedians, and bingo.

2000–2010

The early 2000s saw Cwmgors RFC victorious in 2 consecutive league titles. They were crowned Champions of WRU Division 6 West in the 2002/03 season, and again in the WRU Division 4 South West in the 2003/04 season. The 2003/04 season also saw the club win the WRU Tovali Bowl.

2010–2020

During the 2012/13 season, the club became champions of WRU SWALEC League Division 5 South West, remaining undefeated in all but one of their league games. The following season saw the club champions for a second consecutive season, winning the WRU SWALEC League Division 4 South West for the 2013/14 season.

The 2014/15 season saw the club relocate the majority of home fixtures to the Maerdy playing fields, as redevelopment works were carried out to Parc y Werin. This included levelling the field and a new drainage system. In August 2015, the field was officially reopened by a friendly fixture against Neath RFC. Although Neath won this fixture, Cwmgors were seen as competitive in a number of areas.

== Club honours ==
1st XV

- Swansea and District Challenge Cup 1938 – Winners
- West Wales RFU Challenge Cup 1969/70 – Winners
- West Wales Cup 1969/70 – Winners
- West Wales RU Section E 1987/88 – Winners
- West Wales RU Section C 1993/94 – Winners
- WRU League 7B West 1995/96 – Champions
- WRU Division Six West 2002/03 – Champions
- WRU Division Four South West 2003/04 – Champions
- WRU Tovali Bowl 2003/04 - Winners
- WRU SWALEC League Division 5 South West 2012/13 – Champions
- WRU SWALEC League Division 4 South West 2013/14 – Champions

2nd XV

- Swansea and District RU Section D Winners 1980/1
- Swansea and District RU Merit Table Winners 2005/6

Youth XV

- Amman Valley Youth RU League Winners 1968
- Amman Valley Youth RU Cup Winners 1968
- Ospreys Central Youth League Winners 2018/19

== Home Grounds ==
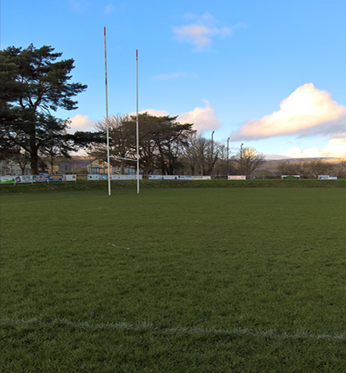
Parc-y-Werin

Cwmgors RFC play their home games at Parc-y-Werin (English: The Peoples Park) located within Gwaun-Cae-Gurwen. Fixtures have been located here since the closing of Parc Howard, Cwmgors in 1950 as a result of coal mining expansion within the area. The park includes the Cwmgors RFC field, tennis courts, bowls pavilion, and changing room facilities which the club shares with Cwmgors Boxing Club.

The Clubs second pitch is located at Maerdy playing fields on the site of the former Maerdy Colliery. Although most games are played at Parc-y-Werin, the Maerdy field was regularly used during the 2014/15 season when redevelopment works were carried out on the main field at Parc-y-Werin.

== Clubhouse ==
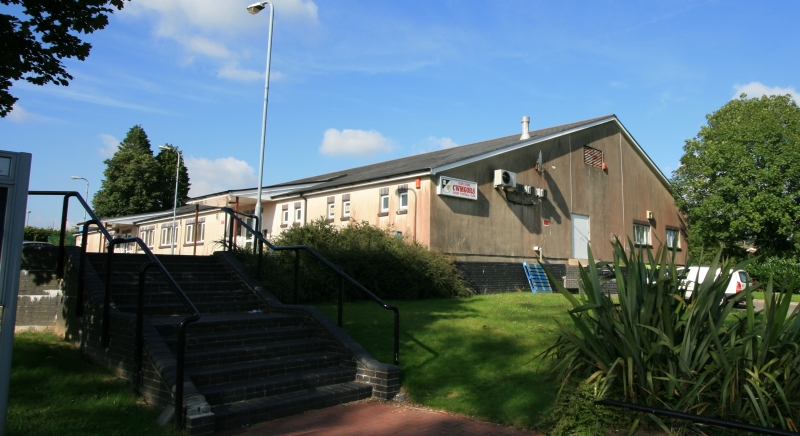
Cwmgors RFC

Cwmgors RFC's clubhouse facilities are located adjacent to the playing field at Parc-y-Werin. The current clubhouse was opened in 1995 on the site of the former Welfare Hall which was redeveloped after falling into disrepair. The clubhouse includes a bar, lounge, and events hall, all of which are regularly used for entertainment, as well as a beer garden to the rear of the clubhouse.

== Club Badge ==
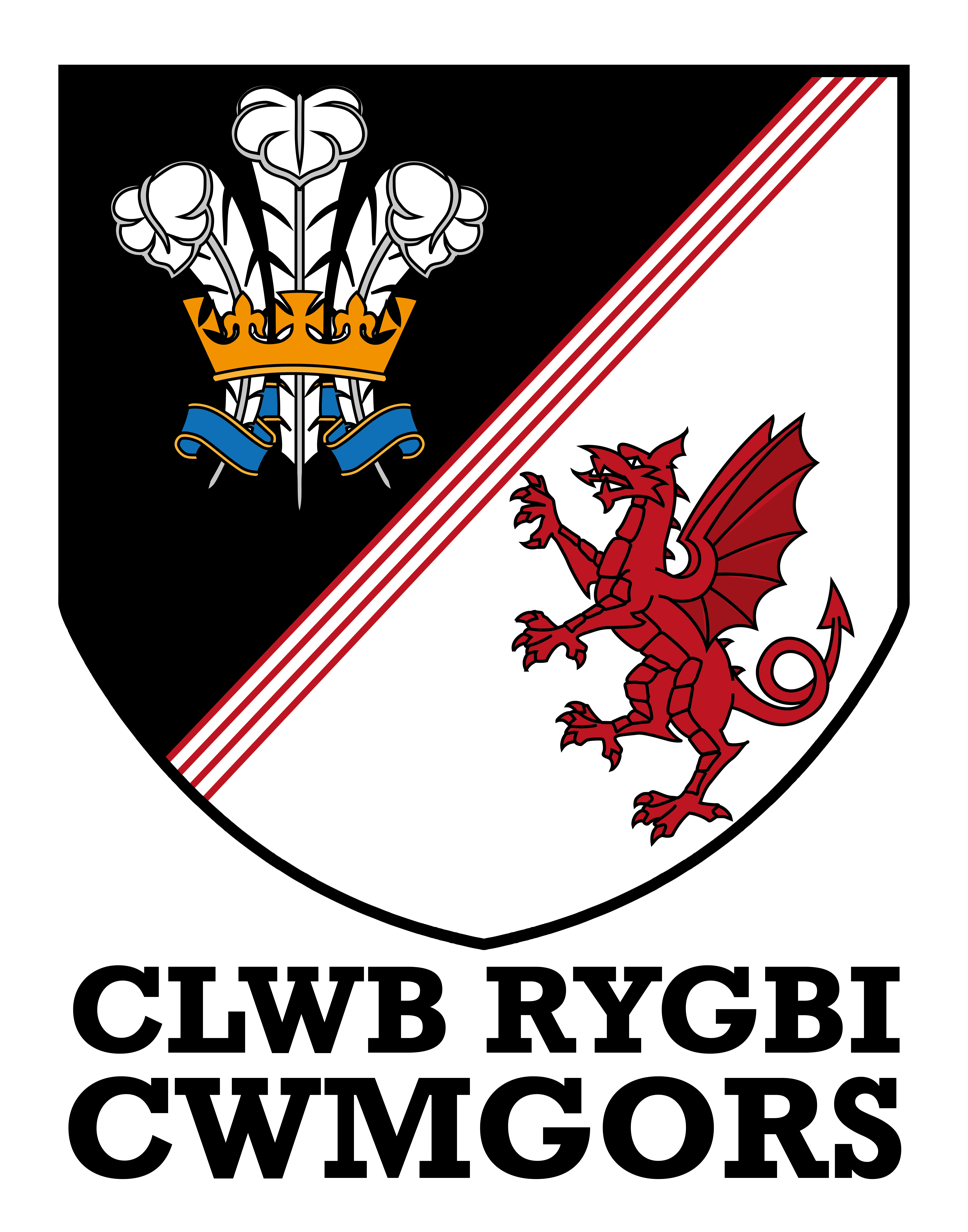
Cwmgors RFC Badge

The badge of Cwmgors RFC was designed in 1950 by Arwyn Morris and Alun James. The badge illustrates the three feathers, a red dragon, and a diagonal line which represents the river Garnant which ran alongside Park Howard, the clubs home field during this time.

== Club officials ==
- Honorary President: Sir Gareth Edwards
- Chairman: Brychan John
- Vice Chairman: Steffan Phillips
- Secretary: Keith Davies
- Treasurer: Keith Davies
- Management Committee: Gerwyn Evans, Chris Jones, Eleri Liles, Shaun Mackey, Sion Phillips, Rhodri Rees, Ceirian Thomas, Darren Thomas

== Current Team Management ==
- Backs Coach: Gareth Davies
- Forwards Coach: Richard Grieg
- Team Manager: Shaun Mackey
- Assistant Team Manager: Liam Griffiths
- Club Captain: Jordan Smith
- Fixture Secretary: Gerwyn Evans
- First Aid: Mya Lockley

== Notable former players ==
- (Wales) Claude Davey (23 caps) (as part of the 'Mond' colliery team)
- (Wales) Will Davies (4 caps) (as part of the 'Mond' colliery team)
- (Wales) Gareth Edwards (53 caps)
- (Wales) Emrys Evans (3 caps)
- (Wales) Denzil Thomas (1 cap)
- (Wales) Geraint Evans (1 cap)

== International Referees ==
- (Wales) Tom Pritchard
- (Wales) David Pritchard
- (Wales) Selwyn Lewis
- (Wales) Winston Jones

== Cherry Sevens ==
The club annually host Cherry Sevens, played on the main field at Parc-y-Werin. This is a 7 a side rugby tournament held during the off season each year, with live music performed at clubhouse following the Rugby tournament. The 2025 tournament is scheduled for the 28th of June.

The inaugural tournament was held in 2023 and saw Bryncoch RFC winners of the competition. The 2024 tournament saw Neath Globetrotters as winners of the main competition, and The Misfits as winners of the Bowl.
