= Tiny Francis =

South African rugby union player

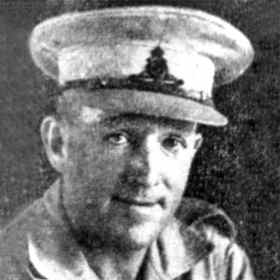
- Born: Murray Godfred Francis; 26 August 1907 Bloemfontein, Orange River Colony
- Died: 2 August 1961 (aged 53) Bloemfontein, South Africa
- School: Kingswood College, Grahamstown

Rugby union career
- Position: Flyhalf
Amateur team(s)
Years	Team	Apps	(Points)
- Old Collegians
- Gardens RFC
- Hamiltons RFC
- Ramblers RC, Bloemfontein
Provincial / State sides
Years	Team	Apps	(Points)
1926–31, 36–38	Free State	60+	
International career
Years	Team	Apps	(Points)
1931–32	South Africa (tour)	8	(18)
- Cricket career

Cricket information

Domestic team information
- Years: Team
- 1925/26–1945/46: Orange Free State
- 1934/35: Western Province
- Source: Cricinfo

Murray Godfred "Tiny" Francis (26 August 1907 – 2 August 1961) was a South African rugby union player, first-class cricketer and hockey player.

== Rugby union career ==
Francis was born in Bloemfontein, South Africa and educated at Kingswood College in Grahamstown. He represented the Free State at provincial level from 1926 to 1931 and then again from 1936 to 1938, gaining over 60 caps for his province. He also represented Northern Province for the All Blacks tour of South Africa in 1928 and again against the British touring side of 1938. During the period 1932 to 1936, he spent in Cape Town, where he played club rugby for Gardens and Hamiltons.

Francis toured with the Springboks to Britain and Ireland in 1931. He was the understudy to the team captain, Bennie Osler and did not play in any test matches, but did play in 8 tour matches. He scored 18 points for the Springboks during the tour, which included 1 try, 4 conversions, 1 penalty goal and 1 drop goal.

== Cricket career ==
Francis played first-class cricket for Orange Free State and Western Province. He played 29 first-class matches and scored 1747 runs at an average of 35.65, with a high score of 125. He also took 18 wickets with a best of 5/50.

== See also ==
- List of South Africa national rugby union players – Springbok no. 218
