= Arthur Lemon =

Wales international rugby union & league footballer

Personal information
- Born: Arthur Whitelock Lemon; 15 April 1905; Tonna, Wales
- Died: 28 May 1982 (aged 77); Neath, Wales

Playing information

Rugby union
- Position: Number 8
Club
Years	Team	Pld	T	G	FG	P
1929–33	Neath RFC	13				0
Representative
Years	Team	Pld	T	G	FG	P
1929–33	Wales	13				0

Rugby league
- Position: loose forward
Club
Years	Team	Pld	T	G	FG	P
1933–34	St Helens	79	9	0	0	27
1934	Streatham and Mitcham
	Total	79	9	0	0	27

Arthur Whitelock Lemon (15 April 1905 – 28 May 1982) was a Welsh international number 8 who played club rugby for Neath and was capped 13 times for Wales, then later switched codes to play rugby league for St Helens when he found that he had been dropped from the Wales team.

== International rugby career ==
Lemon made his international debut for Wales in a game against Ireland on 9 March 1929 under the captaincy of Guy Morgan. Wales drew the game, which handed the Championship to Scotland. Although Lemon missed the opening game of the 1930 Five Nations Championship against England, he was reselected for the remaining three games. Lemon played in all four games of the 1931 tournament, which saw Wales win the Championship for the first time in eight years. Lemon was next selected to play against the 1931 touring South Africans. It was a terrible spectacle played on an icy pitch, that Wales captain Jack Bassett failed to adapt his teams play to. After playing out the entirety of the 1932 Championship, Lemon would play one final match for Wales against Ireland in 1933. When Wales lost the game, the selectors decided on wholesale change and Lemon was amongst 11 players to be dropped.

== Rugby League career ==
On being dropped by Wales, Lemon chose to turn professional with St Helens. He played for one season, then was sold to Streatham and Mitcham R.L.F.C. when Saints were in financial difficulty.

=== International matches played ===
Wales

- England 1931, 1932
- France 1930, 1931
- Ireland 1929, 1930, 1931, 1932, 1933
- Scotland 1930, 1931, 1932
- South Africa 1931

== Bibliography ==
- Billot, John (1974). Springboks in Wales. Ferndale: Ron Jones Publications.
- Goodwin, Terry (1984). The International Rugby Championship 1883-1983. London: Willows Books. ISBN 0-00-218060-X.
- Smith, David; Williams, Gareth (1980). Fields of Praise: The Official History of The Welsh Rugby Union. Cardiff: University of Wales Press. ISBN 0-7083-0766-3.
