= Albert Fear =

Wales international rugby union footballer

- Born: Albert George Fear; 25 August 1907 Abertillery, Wales
- Died: 26 July 2000 (aged 92) Bridgend, Wales
- Occupation: miner

Rugby union career
- Position: Flanker
Amateur team(s)
Years	Team	Apps	(Points)
–	Abertillery RFC		
1933-1940	Newport RFC		
International career
Years	Team	Apps	(Points)
1934-1935	Wales	4	(3)

Albert Fear (25 August 1907 – 26 July 2000) was a Welsh rugby union flanker who played club rugby for Abertillery RFC and Newport and international rugby for Wales.

== Rugby career ==
Before joining Newport RFC, Fear played for Abertillery where he worked as a coal miner. In 1931 the touring South African national team played a joint Abertillery / Cross Keys side of which Fear was selected. It was an extremely tight game, which the unfancied Welsh team gaining in strength as the match progressed, eventually the Springboks won through 10-9.

It took Fear another three years to gain recognition from the Welsh selectors, when on 3 February 1935 he was capped to face Scotland during the Home Nations Championship. Under the captaincy of Claude Davey Wales were victorious over a fairly inexperienced Scottish side, winning 13-6. Fear was re-selected for the next game of the tournament against Ireland at St Helens, and in a game dominated by Wales, Fear scored his first and only international points when he scored a try for his country. Fear returned for Wales the next year when he played in the same two fixtures against Scotland and Ireland in the 1935 Championship, though these were his last international caps.

=== International matches played ===
Wales

- Ireland 1934, 1935
- Scotland 1934, 1935

== Bibliography ==
- Billot, John (1974). Springboks in Wales. Ferndale: Ron Jones Publications.
- Godwin, Terry (1984). The International Rugby Championship 1883-1983. London: Willows Books. ISBN 0-00-218060-X.
- Smith, David; Williams, Gareth (1980). Fields of Praise: The Official History of The Welsh Rugby Union. Cardiff: University of Wales Press. ISBN 0-7083-0766-3.
