= Tal Harris =

- Born: Charles Albert Harris; 4 February 1903 Cardiff, Wales
- Died: 1 October 1963 (aged 60) Aberavon, Wales
- School: Eastern School, Port Talbot

Rugby union career
- Position: Scrum-half
Amateur team(s)
Years	Team	Apps	(Points)
- Briton Ferry RFC
–	Maesteg RFC		
–	Aberavon RFC		
–	Neath RFC		
–	Cheltenham		
International career
Years	Team	Apps	(Points)
1927	Wales	1	(0)

Charles "Tal" Harris (4 February 1903 - 1 October 1963) was a Welsh international rugby union scrum-half who represented Wales and played club rugby for Aberavon.

== Rugby career ==
Harris played for Aberavon during their 'golden era' which saw the team crowned Welsh Club Champions four consecutive years from the 1923/24 to the 1926/27 season. While playing for Aberavon, Harris was awarded his one and only Welsh cap against the touring Australian Waratahs. The match took place on 26 November 1927 at the Cardiff Arms Park, and although the Welsh forwards showed strength and commitment, were out-classed by the tourist back play.

In 1931, while still with Aberavon, Harris was part of the joint Neath / Aberavon team that narrowly lost to the 1931 touring South Africans. Harris was challenged to the position by Neath's Cliff Evans, but Harris was considered more experienced and tougher. The match was a close contest, and with three minuted left on the clock the score line was 3-3 after the Welsh side had taken an early lead; but the tourist fought back and scored a try with the last move of the game. During the match, Harris and his Aberavon team mate Wilf Selby were considered the better pairing than the South African duo of Danie Craven and Bennie Osler, but the Welsh team's threequarter line was believed to have let them down with slow distribution.

=== International matches played ===
Wales

- (Australia) New South Wales Waratahs 1927

=== The Tal Harris Appreciation Society ===
The Tal Harris Appreciation Society was formed in 1994, dedicated to the memory of Tal Harris. They journey to Dublin every two years on the occasion of the Ireland v Wales rugby union match.

== Bibliography ==
- Billot, John (1974). Springboks in Wales. Ferndale: Ron Jones Publications.
- Smith, David; Williams, Gareth (1980). Fields of Praise: The Official History of The Welsh Rugby Union. Cardiff: University of Wales Press. ISBN 0-7083-0766-3.
