= Tom Day (rugby union) =

Wales international rugby union player

- Born: Thomas Brynmor Day Glanamman, Wales
- Died: Swansea, Wales
- School: Coedffranc School, Skewen
- Notable relative(s): Billy Trew, father-in-law

Rugby union career
- Position: Forward
Amateur team(s)
| Years | Team | Apps | (Points) |
- Gorseinon RFC
| – | Swansea RFC | | |
International career
| Years | Team | Apps | (Points) |
| 1931-1935 | Wales | 13 | (0) |

Tom Day (1907 - 18 September 1980) was a Wales international rugby union player who played club rugby for Swansea. He was awarded 13 caps for Wales and was part of the Welsh side that won the 1931 Five Nations Championship.

Day first came to notice while playing for the Wales Secondary Schools, moving to Gorseinon after leaving school. In 1928 he moved teams to Swansea, at the same time as Claude Davey. He stayed with Swansea for the entirety of his international career and captained them during the 1933/34 season. On 10 October 1931 he was part of the Swansea team that faced the touring South Africans, and although losing the game, Day had an outstanding game at the front of the pack, closing the game down whenever he could.

== International rugby ==
Day was first selected for Wales in the 1931 Five Nations tournament and was the only new cap in the Welsh squad. The match ended in a draw, though there was confusion in the match regarding a conversion from England's Don Burland; When at half-time the referee overturned the touch judges decision that he had missed the kick. Day was selected for the next three matches of the championship, with Wales winning all three games and winning the tournament. Day was selected to face the touring South Africans towards the end on 1931, as he had done so for Swansea, and was part of the 1932 Home Nations Championship. He missed the 1933 tournament, which famously included the end of the Twickenham curse, but was back in 1934. His last game was on the losing side against Ireland at Ravenhill on 9 March 1935.

=== International matches played ===
Wales

- England 1931, 1932, 1935
- France 1931
- Ireland 1931, 1932, 1934, 1935
- Scotland 1931, 1932, 1934, 1935
- South Africa 1931

== Bibliography ==
- Billot, John (1974). Springboks in Wales. Ferndale: Ron Jones Publications.
- Smith, David; Williams, Gareth (1980). Fields of Praise: The Official History of The Welsh Rugby Union. Cardiff: University of Wales Press. ISBN 0-7083-0766-3.
- Thomas, Wayne (1979). A Century of Welsh Rugby Players. Ansells Ltd.
