= Ned Jenkins =

Wales international rugby union footballer

- Born: Edward Macdonald Jenkins; 28 July 1904 Tonyrefail, Wales
- Died: 8 November 1990 (aged 86) Porthcawl, Wales
- Height: 1.85 m (6 ft 1 in)
- Weight: 106.5 kg (16 st 11 lb)
- School: Cefn Cribbwr School
- Occupation: Police officer

Rugby union career
- Position: Lock
Amateur team(s)
Years	Team	Apps	(Points)
- Kenfig Hill RFC
1923-1924	Cardiff RFC		
1925-1935	Aberavon RFC		
–	Bridgend RFC		
–	Glamorgan Police RFC		
–	Glamorgan County RFC		
International career
Years	Team	Apps	(Points)
1927–1932	Wales	21	(0)

Ned Jenkins (28 July 1904 – 8 November 1990) was an international rugby union lock who represented Wales and played club rugby for Aberavon. Like teammate Tom Arthur, Jenkins was an amateur boxer.

== Rugby career ==
Jenkins joined Aberavon in 1925 at the height of their 'golden era' which saw the team crowned Welsh Club Champions four consecutive years from the 1923/24 to the 1926/27 season. Jenkins would later captain Aberavon for three seasons in the late early 1930s and was part of the joint Neath / Aberavon team that narrowly lost to the 1930 touring South Africans.

Jenkins was first capped for Wales against Scotland on 3 February 1927. In the programme for the match, Jenkins was described as 'the fourth member of the Glamorgan Constabulary on duty today, and not the least clever by any means'. Jenkins played in five Five Nations Championships, including Jack Bassett's 1931 Championship winning side. Of the 1931 tournament matches, the encounter with Ireland was the most notable, with heavy injuries on both sides as Wales chased the Championship and Ireland the Triple Crown. Jenkins himself suffered a neck injury that caused him some paralysis, though he finished the game on the pitch. Wales won the game 15-3, helped by the fact that Ireland lost Crowe to a concussion in the second half.

Jenkins was also selected to face two touring sides, the 1927 Waratahs and the 1931 South Africans.

=== International matches played ===
Wales

- England 1928, 1930, 1931, 1932
- France 1927, 1928, 1929, 1930, 1931
- Ireland 1927, 1928, 1930, 1931, 1932
- (Australia) New South Wales Waratahs 1927
- Scotland 1927, 1928, 1930, 1931, 1932
- South Africa 1931

== Bibliography ==
- Smith, David; Williams, Gareth (1980). Fields of Praise: The Official History of The Welsh Rugby Union. Cardiff: University of Wales Press. ISBN 0-7083-0766-3.
- Thomas, Wayne (1979). A Century of Welsh Rugby Players. Ansells Ltd.
