= Jeff Gray =

Jeff Gray may refer to:

- Jeff Gray (baseball, born 1963), former Major League Baseball pitcher for Cincinnati and Boston
- Jeff Gray (baseball, born 1981), former Major League Baseball pitcher for Oakland, Chicago (NL), Chicago (AL), Seattle, and Minnesota
- Jeffrey Alan Gray (1934–2004), British psychologist

== See also ==
- Geoff Gray (born 1994), Canadian gridiron football player
- Geoff Gray (cricketer) (born 1943), Australian cricket player
- Geoff Gray (rugby union), South African international rugby union player
- Geoffrey Gray (born 1979), American author, documentary producer, and journalist
- Geoffrey Gray (basketball) (born 1997), American-Israeli professional basketball player
- Geoffrey Grey (1934–2023), British composer
- Jeffrey Grey (1959–2016), Australian military historian
