= Harry Peacock =

Harry Peacock may refer to:

- Harry Peacock (rugby union)
- Harry Peacock (actor)
