= Tom Arthur (rugby union) =

Wales international rugby union player

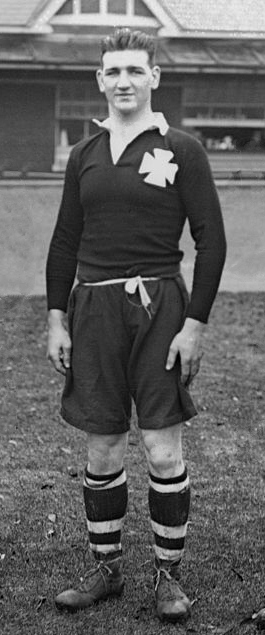
- Arthur in 1928
- Born: Tom Arthur; 10 January 1906 Pontypridd, Wales
- Died: 1 November 1986 (aged 80) Cardiff, Wales
- Occupation(s): Blacksmith; Police officer

Rugby union career
- Position: Lock
Amateur team(s)
Years	Team	Apps	(Points)
?-1923	Glynneath RFC		
1923–1934	Neath RFC		
–	Glamorgan Police RFC		
International career
Years	Team	Apps	(Points)
1927–1933	Wales	18	(12)

Tom Arthur (10 January 1906 – 1 November 1986) was a Welsh international rugby union lock who played club rugby for Neath and was capped 18 times for Wales. A tough second row forward with a strong physique, Arthur was often criticised for being over-vigorous. Though his style of play was fairly typical for Welsh rugby at the time.

Arthur was also a strong scummager and was adaptable in the open and was excellent in the line-out. His signature move was his line-out 'flip', where he would grab the ball one handed and guide it to his waiting scrum-half.

== International rugby career ==
Arthur joined Neath from Glynneath RFC in 1923, and made his debut for the club in a game against Pontypool in December that year. After consistent good play for Neath, he showed promise in Welsh trials and was selected to the national squad in 1927 to face Scotland as part of the Five Nations Championship. Wales lost the game, but Arthur was reselected to face both France and Ireland in the later stages of the same tournament. The Welsh forwards were terrible in the game against Ireland and their eight-man pack was outclassed by the seven man Irish pack. Arthur was dropped for the next season, but after an outstanding Neath season, he was back for the 1929 Five Nations Championship.

Arthur was well known for his aggressive style of play, and this was shown in two matches against in France. In 1929, Arthur scored a try for Wales at the Cardiff Arms Park and three French players were knocked out in the tackle to save the try. The next year at a game at the Stade Colombes, the mood and the match turned nasty with the French using fist and boot to subdue the Welsh team. The trouble started when Welsh full back Tommy Scourfield cleared a loose ball to touch only for the chasing French player to run over and punch him. Arthur and fellow second row, Aberavon's Ned Jenkins had to pack down in the front row due to the oversized French props, and after one scrummage, Welsh hooker Bert Day was kicked in the mouth by a French lock and required nine stitches. Arthur retaliated on the French pack, but mistook one of the props for the offending lock. This escalated into running fist fights throughout the match, and when Wales left the pitch, they were pelted by rubber cushions from the crowd.

In 1931 Arthur was capped to face the touring South Africans. He had been part of the joint Neath / Aberavon team that had faced the Springboks at the Gnoll in November. The tourist were lucky to win the match after a dubious last minute try, and when Arthur was picked for Wales he did so with two other players from the same match, Ned Jenkins and Arthur Lemon. Although he was dropped for the 1932 season, Arthur was back for the 1933 Home Nations Championship, playing against England and Scotland.

=== International matches played ===
Wales

- England 1929, 1930, 1931, 1933
- France 1927, 1929, 1930, 1931
- Ireland 1927, 1929, 1930, 1931
- Scotland 1927, 1929, 1930, 1931, 1933
- South Africa 1931

== Bibliography ==
- Billot, John (1974). Springboks in Wales. Ferndale: Ron Jones Publications.
- Griffiths, John (1987). The Phoenix Book of International Rugby Records. London: Phoenix House. ISBN 0-460-07003-7.
