= Bill Everson =

Welsh international rugby union footballer (1906–1966)

- Born: William Aaron Everson; 15 March 1906 Rudry, Wales
- Died: 26 April 1966 (aged 60) Newport, Wales
- School: Caerphilly Grammar School
- Occupation(s): Police officer tobacconist

Rugby union career
- Position: fullback
Amateur team(s)
| Years | Team | Apps | (Points) |
- Machen RFC
| – | Pill Harriers RFC | | |
| – | Newport RFC | | |
| – | Newport Police | | |
International career
| Years | Team | Apps | (Points) |
| 1926 | Wales | 1 | (2) |

William Aaron Everson (15 March 1906 – 26 April 1966) was a Welsh international rugby union fullback who played club rugby for Newport and was capped for Wales in 1926. Despite only winning a single international cap, he was a pivotal member for Newport and a record breaking club player.

== Rugby career ==
Everson played for Machen, Newport Police and Pill Harriers before switching to Newport during the 1925/1926 season. In his first season for the club he played in 30 matches, scoring 90 points; which was enough to draw him to the attention of the Welsh selectors. He played just a single game for Wales, the encounter with Scotland as part of the 1926 Five Nations Championship. Played at Murrayfield, Everson was brought in as a replacement for Swansea's David Evans, but when Wales lost the game, Everson was never chosen to represent his country again. Despite the loss, Everson did score his only international points during the game when he converted Ron Herrera's try.

Although Everson failed to achieve another cap for Wales, his record at Newport continued to improve. Over the 12 seasons he represented the club, from 1925 to 1937, he played in 314 matches scoring 856 points, including 245 conversions and 111 penalties. His points scored was a club record, which remained unbroken until 1962. Everson was also given the captaincy of the senior team on two occasions, in the 1930/31 season, and again in 1933/34. While with Newport he faced one international touring team, the 1927 Waratahs.

With his playing career behind him, Everson continued his connection with Newport by becoming a committee member. He was also instrumental in setting up Wales' first rugby sevens tournament, the Snelling Sevens. The competition recognised his commitment to its founding when the Bill Everson Award was set up after Everson's death in 1966. The trophy was awarded to the player of the tournament, and its recipients included Barry John, J.J. Williams, Jonathan Davies and Robert Howley.

=== International matches played ===
Wales

- Scotland 1926

== Bibliography ==
- Godwin, Terry (1984). The International Rugby Championship 1883–1983. London: Willows Books. ISBN 0-00-218060-X.
- Griffiths, John (1987). The Phoenix Book of International Rugby Records. London: Phoenix House. ISBN 0-460-07003-7.
- Smith, David; Williams, Gareth (1980). Fields of Praise: The Official History of The Welsh Rugby Union. Cardiff: University of Wales Press. ISBN 0-7083-0766-3.

Rugby Union Captain
| Preceded by Harry Phillips | Newport RFC Captain; 1930–1931 | Succeeded by Jack Morley |
| Preceded by Dicky Ralph | Newport RFC Captain; 1933–1934 | Succeeded by Ed Shiner |
