= Major Egan =

Irish rugby union player

- Full name: James D. Egan
- Died: 4 December 1984

Rugby union career
- Position: Fullback
International career
Years	Team	Apps	(Points)
1931	Ireland	3	(0)

James Egan, known as Major Egan, was an Irish international rugby union player.

A fullback, Egan was capped three times for Ireland in 1931, debuting against France at Colombes. He also appeared in their win over England at Twickenham and later that year faced the touring Springboks at Lansdowne Road.

Egan served as an officer in the Irish Guards and was married to a member of the wealthy American Merck family.

== See also ==
- List of Ireland national rugby union players
