= Jock van Niekerk =

South African rugby union player

- Full name: Jasper Albertus van Niekerk
- Born: 1 June 1907 Constantia, Cape Town, South Africa
- Died: 19 April 1983 (aged 75) Observatory, Cape Town, South Africa
- Height: 5 ft 10 1/2 in (1.79 m)
- Weight: 175 lb (79 kg)

Rugby union career
- Position: Wing
Provincial / State sides
Years	Team	Apps	(Points)
- Western Province
International career
Years	Team	Apps	(Points)
1928	South Africa	1	(0)

Jasper Albertus van Niekerk (1 June 1907 – 19 April 1983) was a South African international rugby union player.

== Biography ==
Born in Constantia, van Niekerk was educated at Wynberg Boys' High School and South African College Schools in his native Cape Town. He played rugby as a wing-three quarter and was a speedy player with a deceptive swerve. A member of the Villager club, van Niekerk was a Western Province representative.

Van Niekerk was capped once for the Springboks, appearing against the touring 1928 All Blacks at Cape Town. He also made the 1931–32 tour of Britain, but only played three minutes of a match against Midland Counties before succumbing to a tour ending knee injury, having earlier damaged his cartilage in a practice session.

Retiring after the England tour, van Niekerk served with the South African Medical Corps as an ambulance driver in World War II. It took him five attempts to enlist before being passed fit for active service, on account of his bad knee.

== See also ==
- List of South Africa national rugby union players
