= Edgar Long =

Wales international rugby union player (1907-1958)

Eddie Long
- Born: Edgar Cecil Long; 1907 Gower, Wales
- Died: 31 January 1958 (aged 50–51) Swansea, Wales

Rugby union career
- Position: Flanker
Amateur team(s)
Years	Team	Apps	(Points)
1925-1939	Swansea RFC		
International career
Years	Team	Apps	(Points)
1936–1939	Wales	7	(0)

Edgar Long (1907–31 January 1958) was a Welsh international rugby union flanker who played club rugby for Swansea and was capped seven times for Wales. He is best remembered not for his international duties, but for his marshalling of the Swansea pack during the club's victory of the 1935 touring New Zealand team.

== Club career ==
Long joined Swansea in 1925 while still a teenager and spent almost the entirety of his sporting career with the club. While playing with the 'All Whites' he faced several touring teams including the Māoris, the Waratahs, South Africa and New Zealand. In the game against New Zealand in 1935, Edgar led the Swansea team as club captain in a notable victory over one of the most impressive rugby teams of the day. Known by many as the game in which schoolboys Willie Davies and Claude Davey 'beat' the All Blacks, the contribution of Long and the rest of the forwards is often forgotten. In the second half of the game, Long switched the play of his pack into adopting 'spoiling' tactics, matching the New Zealand's own often physical style, in an attempt to slow the game down. The tactics succeeded but resulted in 'unpardonable scenes' in which both sides switched to fist fighting as players tired towards the end of the game. The win for Swansea gave them the record of being the first team to beat all three major Southern hemisphere teams. While club captain during the 1935/36 season, Long was also the season's top points scorer.

== International career ==
Long was first capped for Wales in a 1936 Home Nations Championship match against England at St Helens. The game was a surprising 0–0 draw, with many supporters disappointed as both teams had shown flair in beating the touring New Zealanders just a few weeks earlier. Long was recalled for the next two games of the tournament, which saw Wales beat both Scotland and Ireland to win the Championship.

Long retained his place for the first two matches of the 1937 Championship, but ended on the losing side in both. Long was not recalled for another two years, but in 1939 was selected to represent Wales again against Scotland under the captaincy of Wilf Wooller. Wales won the game 11–3, and when they beat Ireland at Ravenhill a month later they won Championship again. Long may have been selected for further internationals, but the Ireland game was his last as the outbreak of World War II suspended international rugby for eight years.

=== International matches played ===
Wales

- England 1936, 1937
- Ireland 1936, 1939
- Scotland 1936, 1937, 1939

== Bibliography ==
- Billot, John (1972). All Blacks in Wales. Ferndale: Ron Jones Publications.
- Billot, John (1974). Springboks in Wales. Ferndale: Ron Jones Publications.
- Godwin, Terry (1984). The International Rugby Championship 1883-1983. London: Willows Books. ISBN 0-00-218060-X.
- Smith, David; Williams, Gareth (1980). Fields of Praise: The Official History of The Welsh Rugby Union. Cardiff: University of Wales Press. ISBN 0-7083-0766-3.
