= Ponie van der Westhuizen =

South African rugby union player (1909–1995)

- Full name: Johannes Hermanus van der Westhuizen
- Born: 4 November 1909 Darling, South Africa
- Died: 5 March 1995 (aged 85) Springs, South Africa
- University: Stellenbosch University
- Notable relative: JC van der Westhuizen (brother)

Rugby union career
- Position: Winger / Centre
Provincial / State sides
Years	Team	Apps	(Points)
- Western Province
International career
Years	Team	Apps	(Points)
1931–32	South Africa	3	(0)

Johannes Hermanus "Ponie" van der Westhuizen (4 November 1909 – 5 March 1995) was a South African international rugby union player.

== Biography ==
Born in Darling, a farming community near Cape Town, van der Westhuizen was a younger brother of Springboks centre JC van der Westhuizen and went to school locally in the Swartland.

A utility back, van der Westhuizen was most effective as a wing three–quarter due to his pace, thought could also play capably at fullback and at times as a forward. He played club rugby for Stellenbosch University and later Caledon, representing Western Province at representative level. His Springboks opportunity came as a member of the 1931–32 tour of Britain and Ireland, where he featured in three of the four Test matches. He appeared on the right wing in wins over both Ireland and England, before moving to outside centre for the defeat of Scotland. In total, van der Westhuizen played 16 matches during the tour and scored 45 points.

Post rugby, van der Westhuizen served for a time as Inspector of Coloured schools in the Western Cape.

== See also ==
- List of South Africa national rugby union players
