= André McDonald =

South African rugby union player (1909–1991)

- Full name: Jacobus Andreas Joubert McDonald
- Born: 17 February 1909 Murraysburg, South Africa
- Died: 13 July 1991 (aged 82) Brandfort, South Africa
- Height: 1.78 m (5 ft 10 in)
- Weight: 81.7 kg (180 lb)
- University: Stellenbosch University
- Occupation: Minister

Rugby union career
- Position: Flanker / No. 8
Provincial / State sides
| Years | Team | Apps | (Points) |
- Western Province
International career
| Years | Team | Apps | (Points) |
| 1931–32 | South Africa | 4 | (0) |

Jacobus Andreas Joubert "André" McDonald (17 February 1909 – 13 July 1991) was a South African international rugby union player and Christian minister.

== Biography ==
McDonald, the son of a minister, was born in Murraysburg, Cape Province, and attended high school in Ceres.

A rugby product of Stellenbosch University, where he was training for the ministry, McDonald was initially utilised as a centre in the seconds and it wasn't until coach Mark Markötter switched him to the back row that he became a first team regular. He went on to represent Western Province and featured for the Springboks on their 1931–32 tour of Britain and Ireland. South Africa won all four Test matches, with McDonald a member of the back row for all fixtures.

McDonald left South Africa in 1934 to study theology at Princeton University in the United States. On his return, he served at first as a student minister for the Transvaal Church, and over the next 40 years was a minister across several Dutch Reformed Churches, before retiring in 1975 while a minister in Brandfort-Oos, where a church hall was named after him. He had three children in his marriage with Anna Maria Dorothea Brink.

== See also ==
- List of South Africa national rugby union players
