= Floors Venter =

South African rugby union player (1909–1992)

- Full name: Floris Daniël Venter
- Born: 13 April 1909 Pietersburg, South Africa
- Died: 27 September 1992 (aged 83)
- Height: 1.80 m (5 ft 11 in)
- Weight: 79.8 kg (176 lb)

Rugby union career
- Position: Wing
Provincial / State sides
Years	Team	Apps	(Points)
- Transvaal
International career
Years	Team	Apps	(Points)
1931–33	South Africa	3	(0)

Floris Daniël Venter (13 April 1909 – 27 September 1992) was a South African international rugby union player.

Venter was born in Pietersburg and educated at Volkskool in Heidelberg.

Strongly–built, Venter was a powerful runner who relied on strength rather than pace to break through opponents. He made the Springboks squad for the 1931–32 tour of Britain and Ireland, with his selection coming in part due to his abilities in wet weather rugby. His tour got off to a bad start when he broke his nose in the opening fixture against a combined Gloucestershire/Somerset XV. He returned in time for the first of the international matches, appearing on the right wing against Wales at St. Helens. After missing the matches against Ireland and England, Venter gained a second cap in the Springboks' win over Scotland at Murrayfield. He was capped a third and final time in a home international against the Wallabies at Ellis Park in 1933. A civil servant in Pretoria, Venter was a Transvaal representative for provincial rugby.

Venter also represented Transvaal as a javelin thrower and was a competitor at the national wrestling championships.

== See also ==
- List of South Africa national rugby union players
