= Alvi van der Merwe =

South African rugby union player

Alvi van der Merwe (Springbok Rugby Union Player no. 221)
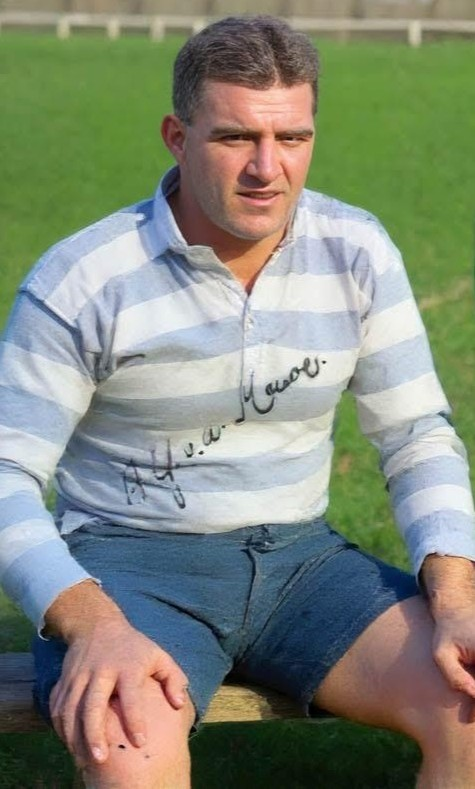
- Springbok No. 221
- Full name: Albertus Viljoen van der Merwe
- Born: 14 September 1908 Rawsonville, South Africa
- Died: 18 September 1986 (aged 78)
- Height: 5 ft 10 in (178 cm)
- Weight: 200 lb (91 kg)

Rugby union career
- Position: Wing–forward
Provincial / State sides
Years	Team	Apps	(Points)
- Western Province
International career
Years	Team	Apps	(Points)
1931	South Africa	1	(0)

Albertus Viljoen van der Merwe III (14 September 1908 – 18 September 1986), known as Alvi van der Merwe, was a South African international rugby union player and farmer.

Born in Rawsonville, van der Merwe attended the nearby Worcester Boys' High School, where he picked up rugby. He completed his secondary education at Rondebosch Boys' High School and afterwards became a fruit farmer in Worcester.

A sturdy forward, van der Merwe represented Western Province Country in the 1928 All Blacks' tour opening fixture and is credited with scoring the first try against a touring New Zealand team in South Africa. He gained his Springboks cap no.221 on the 1931–32 tour of Britain and Ireland, playing as a wing–forward against Wales at St. Helens.

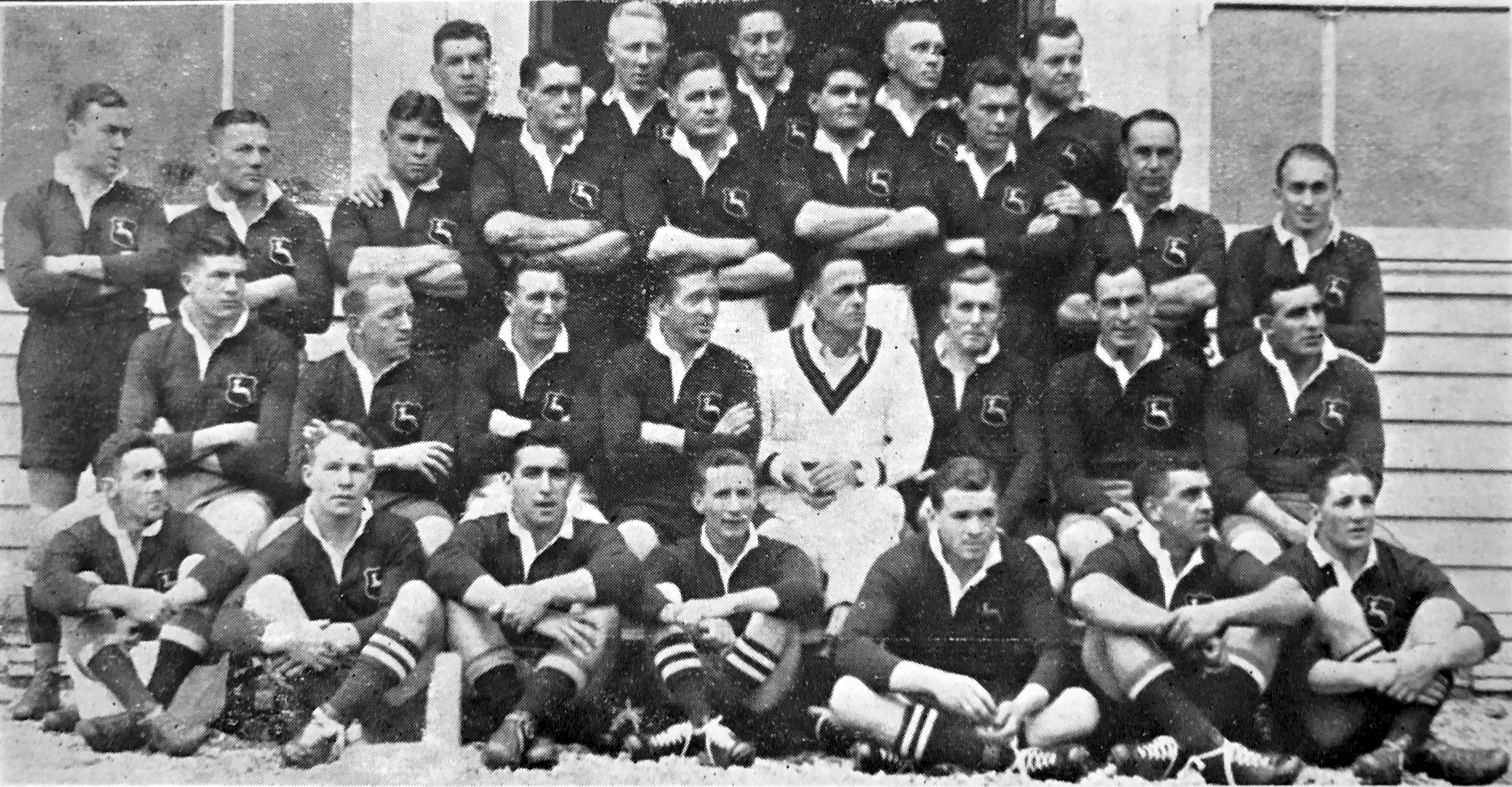
South Africa rugby union touring team during the 1931–32 tour of Britain and Ireland; Albertus Viljoen van der Merwe I is seated in the front row, second from the left.

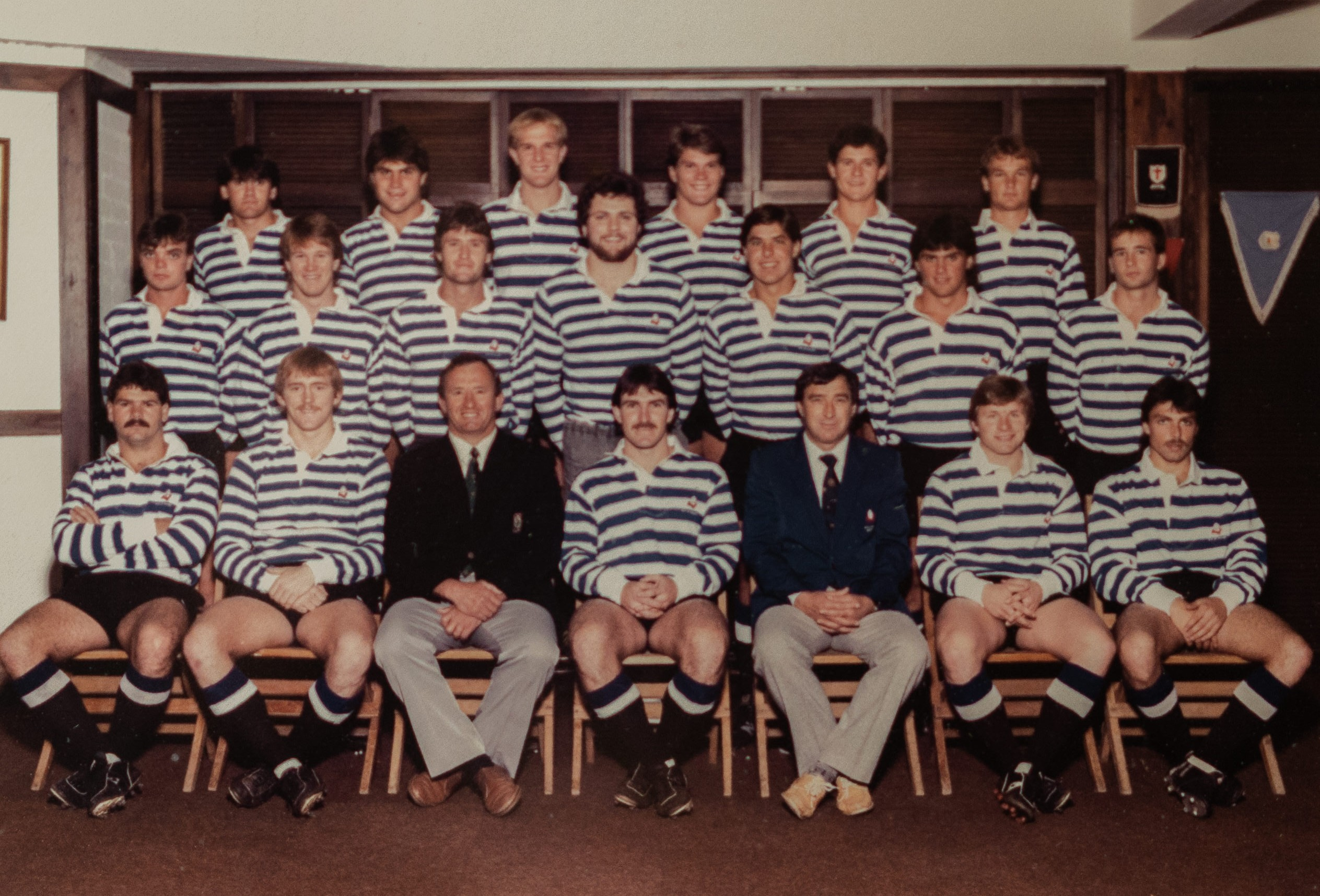
Western Province Rugby Football Union Under-20 team, 1985. Albertus Viljoen van der Merwe III (back row, far left).

== Legacy ==
In 1928, during the visit of the New Zealand "Invincibles" rugby team to South Africa, van der Merwe, then aged 19, scored the first try ever recorded against the touring side on African soil. He was later selected as the 221 player to represent the South Africa national rugby union team - the Springboks.

That number, 221, has since become emblematic of his legacy. The van der Merwe family's wine estate, Alvi's Drift, established on the Breede River near Worcester, commemorates him through its 221 Range, named in his honour and symbolising his contribution to South African rugby history.

The farm itself takes its name from a low-water bridge constructed by van der Merwe across the Breede River in 1928 to connect his property with the surrounding valley. The name Breede (or Bree) derives from the Afrikaans word meaning "wide" or "broad." The bridge became known locally as "Alvi's Drift," a name that eventually came to identify both the estate and the wines produced there.

Albertus Viljoen van der Merwe's legacy continued through successive generations of the van der Merwe family. His son, Albertus Viljoen van der Merwe II, known as Oom Bertie, maintained the family's farming operations along the Breede River near Worcester. The third generation, Albertus Viljoen van der Merwe III, known as Alvi, also pursued rugby and represented Western Province at Under-20 level in 1985. He further developed the estate, expanding agricultural production to include commercial viticulture and winemaking within the Scherpenheuvel wine ward of the Worcester district in the Breede River Valley wine region. The estate remains a multi-generational family enterprise within South Africa's South African wine industry and is due to mark its centenary in 2028.

== See also ==
- List of South Africa national rugby union players
