= Bert Kipling =

South African rugby union player

- Full name: Herbert George Kipling
- Born: 24 December 1903 Kimberley, Griqualand West, South Africa
- Died: 13 September 1981 (aged 77)
- Height: 1.83 m (6 ft 0 in)
- Weight: 91.6 kg (202 lb)

Rugby union career
- Position: Hooker
Provincial / State sides
| Years | Team | Apps | (Points) |
- Griqualand West
- Transvaal
International career
| Years | Team | Apps | (Points) |
| 1931–33 | South Africa | 9 | (0) |

Herbert George Kipling (24 December 1903 – 13 September 1981) was a South African international rugby union player.

== Biography ==
Born in Kimberley, Griqualand West, Kipling was educated at a local school in Beaconsfield and had a brother Jock who was also a provincial rugby representative.

Kipling was the Springboks hooker for all four internationals on their 1931–32 tour of Britain and Ireland. He played at the time with his brother for Griqualand West, before switching to Transvaal in 1933, when he gained a further five caps in a home series against the Wallabies.

The song Die Verhaal van Blokkies Joubert, by composer David Kramer, was said to be based on Kipling.

== See also ==
- List of South Africa national rugby union players
