= Manie Geere =

South African rugby union player

- Full name: Vernon Geere
- Born: 9 September 1905 Pretoria, South Africa
- Died: 25 October 1989 (aged 84)
- Height: 1.83 m (6 ft 0 in)
- Weight: 90.7 kg (200 lb)

Rugby union career
- Position: Forward
Provincial / State sides
Years	Team	Apps	(Points)
- Transvaal
International career
Years	Team	Apps	(Points)
1933	South Africa	5	(0)

Vernon "Manie" Geere (9 September 1905 – 25 October 1989) was a South African international rugby union player.

Geere was born in Pretoria and completed his secondary education at Paarl Boys' High School, where he was captain of their under-17s rugby XV. He returned to Pretoria after leaving school to serve three years with the Army and then played rugby for local club Harlequin, while working as a bank clerk.

A utility forward, Geere gained Springboks representative honours on the 1931–32 tour of the British Isles, but didn't make a capped appearance. He played all five home Test matches against the Wallabies in 1933.

Geere married a cousin of Springboks teammate Ferdie Bergh.

== See also ==
- List of South Africa national rugby union players
