= John Dold =

South African sportsman

John Biddulph Dold (3 January 1902 – 17 September 1968) was a South African rugby union international and first-class cricketer with Eastern Province.

In six first-class matches between the 1922/23 and 1926/27 South African cricket seasons, four of them in the Currie Cup, Dold made 269 runs at 22.41 and took two wickets at the cost of 26.50 runs each. He performed well on his debut, against the touring Marylebone Cricket Club, opening the batting and scoring 55 in his second innings.

Dold, who was born in Grahamstown, played ten matches for the South African national rugby union team but no Tests. He was a member of South Africa's 1931–32 tour of Britain and Ireland and all of his matches came on that tour. A forward, Dold represented Albany at club level and Eastern Province provincially.
