= George Daneel =

South African rugby union player

- Born: George Murray Daneel; 29 August 1904 Calvinia, Cape Colony
- Died: 19 October 2004 (aged 100) Franschhoek, South Africa
- Height: 1.86 m (6 ft 1 in)
- Weight: 86.2 kg (13 st 8 lb)
- School: Robertson Boys High, Robertson
- University: University of Cape Town; Stellenbosch University

Rugby union career
- Position: Number eight
Amateur team(s)
Years	Team	Apps	(Points)
- University of Cape Town
–	Stellenbosch University		
–	Garrison		
Provincial / State sides
Years	Team	Apps	(Points)
1928–1931	Western Province		
1931	Transvaal		
	Western Transvaal	1	
International career
Years	Team	Apps	(Points)
1928–1932	South Africa	8	(6)

George Murray Daneel (29 August 1904 – 19 October 2004) was a South African rugby player.

== Personal history ==
Daneel was born in Calvinia, Cape Colony (now in the Northern Cape) on 29 August 1904 to Marthinus and Charlotte Daneel, and was one of seven children. His father was a Dutch Reformed Church minister who had played rugby for Stellenbosch University against Bill Maclagan's 1891 British team. He also had two other relatives who played at a high level; his uncle Henry Daneel was a member of Paul Roos' 1906–07 team, while one of his cousins, Louis Louw, played on the 1912–13 tour under the captaincy of Billy Millar.

When his father was at Victoria West, Daneel attended the local school, but had to leave in his final year as he was the only senior pupil left and that the standards were not quite up to scratch. His father eventually sent him to school in Robertson, due to the boarding there being inexpensive.

He studied theology at the University of Cape Town (UCT) in 1922 and 1923, failing both years, but managed to complete his final year at Stellenbosch University in 1929.

== Rugby career ==
While still at school he played halfback, alternating between scrum-half and fly-half on opposite sides of the field. After arriving at the University of Cape Town (UCT) with the intention of studying theology, he came to the realization that he had no future at scrum-half and subsequently switched to number 8.

At provincial level, he represented Western Province and Transvaal. During World War II after he had already stopped playing, he was also persuaded to play for and captain Western Transvaal after their regular captain Nic Bierman became ill.

He won his first cap against New Zealand in 1928 and his last against Scotland in 1932.

== Life after rugby ==
On the 1931–32 Springbok tour of the UK and Ireland, he came into contact with Frank Buchman's Oxford Group and decided to give up rugby to be a part of the Moral Re-Armament, although he still coached on occasion. His work with the movement made him particularly unpopular with the government of the time.

Later he followed in his father's footsteps and himself became a religious minister and served as chief chaplain to the South African Forces during World War II.

== See also ==
- 1931–32 South Africa rugby union tour
