= Charles Slow =

English rugby union player (1911–1939)

- Born: Charles Frederick Slow; 15 May 1911 Northampton, England
- Died: 15 April 1939 (aged 27) Stony Stratford, England

Rugby union career
- Position: Fly Half
Senior career
Years	Team	Apps	(Points)
19??–1933	Northampton Saints		
1933–1937	Leicester Tigers	98	(176)
International career
Years	Team	Apps	(Points)
1934	England	1	(0)

Charles Frederick Slow (15 May 1911 – 15 April 1939) was a rugby union player who appeared in 98 games for Leicester Tigers between 1933–1937, and once for England in 1934. He also played for Northampton Saints.

Slow's finest achievement was his role as Leicestershire and the East Midlands beat the touring South Africans– the Springboks–on 14 November 1931, the only defeat the side suffered on their tour. Slow scored a drop goal and two tries as well as setting up the final try for Ralph Buckingham. He was named man of the match.

Slow joined Leicester toward the end of the 1932–33 season; he made his debut against London Welsh on 25 March 1933 at Welford Road. He played 29 times the following season making a fruitful partnership with Bernard Gadney at scrum-half. Slow's sole England cap came on 17 March 1934 against Scotland at Twickenham in the 1934 Home Nations Championship grand slam winning game.

He was killed in a road traffic accident on 15 April 1939 returning from Stoney Stratford's last game of the season.

== Sources ==
- Farmer, Stuart; Hands, David (2014). Tigers - Official history of Leicester Football Club. The Rugby Development Foundation. ISBN 978-0-9930213-0-5.
