= Shaun Waide =

Rugby union player from Northern Ireland

- Full name: Shaun Lockhart Waide
- Born: 8 August 1912 Ballymena, Ireland
- Died: 26 February 1984 (aged 71) Worksop, England
- School: Sedbergh School
- University: Brasenose College, Oxford

Rugby union career
- Position: Wing three-quarter
International career
Years	Team	Apps	(Points)
1932–33	Ireland	5	(9)

Shaun Lockhart Waide (8 August 1912 — 26 February 1984) was an Irish international rugby union player.

Born in Ballymena, Waide was educated at Sedbergh School and Brasenose College, Oxford.

Waide, a wing three-quarter, was aged 19 when he represented Ulster against the touring 1931–32 Springboks. This was followed by three Ireland caps in the 1932 Home Nations and he contributed a try in each of his appearances. He won his blues with Oxford University RFC in the 1932 Varsity Match and the following year gained another two caps for Ireland. His career was ended by a spleen injury he received playing for Oxford University at Gloucester during the 1933–34 season and for a period his condition was listed as critical.

== See also ==
- List of Ireland national rugby union players
