= Ralph Buckingham =

England international rugby union player

- Born: Ralph Arthur Buckingham; 15 January 1907 Blaby, Leicestershire
- Died: 10 April 1988 (aged 81) Stoneygate, Leicester
- School: Rossall School
- Occupation: Company Director of Shoe Merchandiser

Rugby union career
- Position: Centre
Senior career
Years	Team	Apps	(Points)
1924–1935	Leicester Tigers	325	(443)
International career
Years	Team	Apps	(Points)
1927	England	1	(0)

Ralph Arthur Buckingham (15 January 1907 – 10 April 1988) was a rugby union centre and five-eighths who played 325 games for Leicester Tigers between 1924 and 1935 and once for England in 1927.

Buckingham made his Leicester Tigers debut as a 17 year old on 10 September 1924 against Rugby BTH, a works team from British Thomson-Houston in Rugby, he then had to wait until 29 October to play his next game against Moseley where he scored the two tries. Buckingham became a regular in the side playing all of the remaining games of the season from December onward. A versatile back he played wing, centre and five-eights, before settling into the team at fly-half where he played the final 9 games of the 1924–25 season and the whole of the 1925–26 season where he was top try scorer with 14 in 36 games. With the arrival of future Scottish international fly half Harry Greenlees Buckingham moved to five-eights for the next season and then to centre as Leicester moved to the now-standard rugby formation.

A travelling reserve on 10 occasions Buckingham played his only international for England on 2 April 1927 in a 3–0 defeat against France at Colombes. Buckingham played for Leicestershire and East Midlands in 1931, and created one of Charles Slow's tries with a dribble and pick up, when they were the only side to beat the touring Sprinboks in their 26 match tour.

He was Leicester Tigers top-try scorer again in 1930–31 season with 15 and again in 1932–33 with 16. He was captain of the club in the 1933–34 season and during his final year he became first choice goal-kicker top-scoring the season with 101 points in 37 games. In total he scored 117 tries for Leicester, at the time of his retirement he was the club's fourth highest try scorer of all time and currently sits tenth on the list of all-time top try scorers.

== Sources ==
Farmer, Stuart & Hands, David Tigers-Official History of Leicester Football Club (The Rugby DevelopmentFoundation ISBN 978-0-9930213-0-5)
