= 1932 Home Nations Championship =

International rugby union competition

- Date: 16 January - 19 March 1932
- Countries: England; Ireland; Scotland; Wales

Tournament statistics
- Champions: England, Ireland and Wales
- Matches played: 6

The 1932 Home Nations Championship was the twenty-eighth series of the rugby union Home Nations Championship. Including the previous incarnations as the Five Nations, and prior to that, the Home Nations, this was the forty-fifth series of the northern hemisphere rugby union championship. Six matches were played between 16 January and 19 March. It was contested by England, Ireland, Scotland and Wales. Following the 1931 Five Nations series, France had been expelled from the championship for alleged professionalism and administrative deficiencies (they would remain expelled until 1939).

== Table ==
Pos	Team	Pld	W	D	L	PF	PA	PD	Pts
1	Ireland	3	2	0	1	40	29	+11	4
1	Wales	3	2	0	1	28	17	+11	4
1	England	3	2	0	1	32	23	+9	4
4	Scotland	3	0	0	3	11	42	−31	0

== Results ==
January 16, 1932

Wales	12–5	England
Try: Boon; Con: Bassett; Pen: Bassett; Drop: Boon		Try: Coley; Con: Barr

St Helens, Swansea
Attendance: 30,000
Referee: Frank Moffat (Scotland)

February 6, 1932

Scotland	0–6	Wales
		Try: Boon; Pen: Bassett

Murrayfield, Edinburgh
Referee: T Bell (Ireland)

February 13, 1932

Ireland	8–11	England
Try: Waide; Con: Murray; Pen: Murray		Try: Burland; Con: Burland; Pen: Burland (2)

Lansdowne Road, Dublin
Referee: W Burnett (Scotland)

February 27, 1932

Scotland	8–20	Ireland
Try: Wood; Simmers; Con: Allan		Try:Lightfoot (2); Hunt; Waide; Con: Murray (4)

Murrayfield, Edinburgh
Referee: BS Cumberlege (England)

March 12, 1932

Wales	10–12	Ireland
Try: Davey; Ralph; Drop: Ralph		Try: Ross (2); Lightfoot; Waide

Cardiff Arms Park, Cardiff
Referee: E Holmes (England)

March 19, 1932

England	16–3	Scotland
Try: Aarvold (2); Black; Tanner; Con: Burland (2)		Try: Smith

Twickenham, London
Referee: JR Wheeler (Ireland)
