= Geoff Gray (rugby union) =

South African rugby union player

- Full name: Bertram Geoffrey Gray
- Born: 28 July 1909 Hastings, England
- Died: 4 August 1989 (aged 80)
- Height: 1.80 m (5 ft 11 in)
- Weight: 76.7 kg (169 lb)

Rugby union career
- Position: Centre
Provincial / State sides
Years	Team	Apps	(Points)
- Western Province
International career
Years	Team	Apps	(Points)
1931–33	South Africa	4	(0)

Bertram Geoffrey Gray (28 July 1909 – 4 August 1989) was a South African international rugby union player.

Gray was born in Hastings, England, but educated at Diocesan College in Cape Town. He initially played soccer as his chosen sport, until developing pneumonia while acting as a (stationary) goalkeeper, prompting a switch to rugby.

A centre, Gray was a product of rugby at the University of Cape Town, where he played alongside future Springboks three–quarters Stanley Osler and Frank Waring. He made his representative debut for Western Province aged 19.

Gray gained three Springboks caps on their 1931–32 tour of Britain and Ireland, utilised as an inside centre for wins over Wales, England and Scotland. He afterwards had a stint in Eastern Province. After joining Cape Town club Villagers, Gray gained one further Springboks cap, against the Wallabies at Bloemfontein in 1933. He was considered unfortunate to have not had a longer international career on account of persistent injuries.

== See also ==
- List of South Africa national rugby union players
