= David Evans (rugby union, born 1899) =

- Full name: David Benjamin Evans
- Born: 3 September 1899 Llandybie, Wales
- Died: 23 June 1977 (aged 77) Port Talbot, Wales
- Notable relative: Joe Rees (cousin)
- Occupation: Colliery fireman

Rugby union career
- Position: Fullback
International career
| Years | Team | Apps | (Points) |
| 1926 | Wales | 1 | (0) |

David Benjamin Evans (3 September 1899 – 23 June 1977) was a Welsh international rugby union player.

== Biography ==
Evans was originally an association footballer, playing as a goalkeeper for Garnant.

A fullback, Evans played his rugby with Amman United and Swansea. He received a Wales cap in 1926, deputising for Ossie Male in their Five Nations opener against England. The South Wales Evening Post described his tackling as "wholehearted" and on one occasion try saving, but was otherwise critical of his performance.

== See also ==
- List of Wales national rugby union players
