= Laurence McMahon =

Irish rugby union player

- Full name: Laurence Bernard McMahon
- Born: 4 December 1911 Wandsworth, London, England
- Died: 5 January 1987 (aged 75) Dublin, Ireland

Rugby union career
- Position: Centre
International career
Years	Team	Apps	(Points)
1931–38	Ireland	12	(12)

Laurence Bernard McMahon (4 December 1911 — 5 January 1987) was an Irish international rugby union player.

Born in Wandsworth, London, McMahon played his rugby for University College Dublin and was capped 12 times for Ireland during the 1930s, mostly as a centre three-quarter. He scored the winning try for Ireland on his debut match against England at Twickenham in 1931, to put them ahead with two-minutes remaining.

McMahon was a solicitor by profession and founded a legal practice on O'Connell Street in Dublin.

== See also ==
- List of Ireland national rugby union players
