= Cwmgors =

Coordinates: 51.778139°N 3.878525°W

Cwmgors: Welsh: Cwmgors
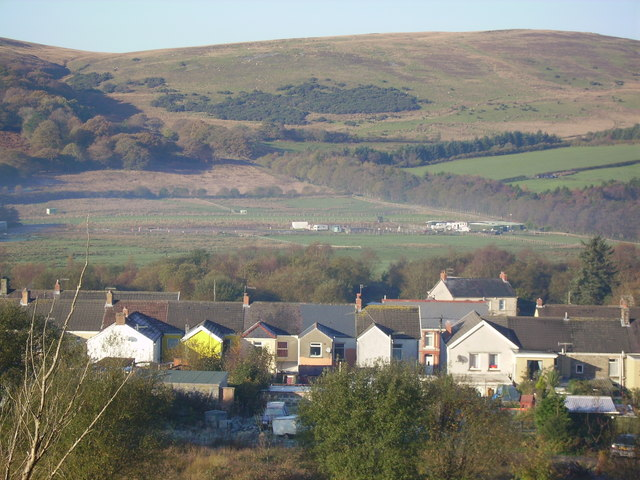

- Location within Neath Port Talbot
- OS grid reference: SN705105
- Community: Gwaun-cae-Gurwen
- Principal area: Neath Port Talbot
- Preserved county: West Glamorgan
- Country: Wales
- Sovereign state: United Kingdom
- Post town: AMMANFORD
- Postcode district: SA18
- Dialling code: 01269
- Police: South Wales
- Fire: Mid and West Wales
- Ambulance: Welsh
- UK Parliament: Brecon, Radnor and Cwm Tawe
- Senedd Cymru – Welsh Parliament: Neath

Cwmgors is a village in the county of Glamorgan, and administered as part of the unitary authority borough of Neath Port Talbot, Wales. It is part of the community of Gwaun-cae-Gurwen and lies within the ceremonial county of West Glamorgan.

Cwmgors is represented in Parliament by David Chadwick and in the Senedd by Jeremy Miles.

Its church, Llanfair, falls within the Diocese of St Davids.

The village used to be home to the Yggd Cwmgors primary school, that closed in 2015. At the time of closure it was a Welsh-medium school having originally been a bilingual village school. It fed Ysgol Gyfun Ystalyfera for fully Welsh-medium education, Ysgol Uwchradd Dyffryn Aman for Welsh- and English-medium education, and Cwmtawe Community Comprehensive School for English-medium education.

== Tommy Davies ==
Tommy Davies was a middleweight boxer who in 1945 fought and lost to Marcel Cerdan at the Palais des Sports, Paris, France. By 1948 Cerdan was world middleweight champion after defeating Tony Zale in 1948 at Roosevelt Stadium, Jersey City, New Jersey, United States. Tommy Davies worked as a coal miner at Cwmgors Colliery and Abernant Colliery, up until circa 1979.

== See also ==
- Cwmgors RFC
- The Electric Revelators
