= Stanley Osler =

South African rugby union player

- Full name: Stanley Gordon Osler
- Born: 31 January 1907 Aliwal North, South Africa
- Died: 16 April 1980 (aged 73) Somerset West, South Africa
- School: Kingswood College
- University: University of Cape Town; University of Oxford
- Notable relative: Bennie Osler (brother)
- Occupation: Schoolmaster

Rugby union career
- Position: Centre
International career
Years	Team	Apps	(Points)
1928	South Africa	1	(0)

Stanley Gordon Osler (31 January 1907 – 16 April 1980) was a South African international rugby union player.

== Biography ==
Known as "Sharkey", Osler was born in Aliwal North and had Cornish ancestry on his father's side. He attended Kingswood College and the University of Cape Town, before going to Oxford as a Rhodes Scholar.

Osler gained his only Springboks cap in 1928, as a centre three-quarter against the touring All Blacks at Durban. His primary position, fly-half, was occupied by his elder brother Bennie Osler. He gained a rugby blue at Oxford in 1931.

From 1947 to 1964, Osler served as headmaster of Kearsney College.

== See also ==
- List of South Africa national rugby union players
