= Jack Russell (rugby union) =

Irish rugby union player (1909–1977)

- Full name: John Russell
- Born: 30 June 1909 Queenstown, Co. Cork, Ireland
- Died: 13 May 1977 (aged 67) Blarney, Co. Cork, Ireland
- University: University College Cork
- Occupation: Medical doctor

Rugby union career
- Position: Lock
International career
Years	Team	Apps	(Points)
1931–37	Ireland	19	(6)

John Russell (30 June 1909 — 13 May 1977) was an Irish international rugby union player.

Born in Queenstown, County Cork, Russell was a second row forward, capped 19 times for Ireland during the 1930s, appearing in six Home Nations campaigns and a match against the Springboks.

Russell obtained a medicine degree from University College Cork.

== See also ==
- List of Ireland national rugby union players
