= Dicky Ralph =

Wales dual-code international rugby footballer

- Born: Albert Raymond Ralph; 21 January 1908 Abercarn, Caerphilly County Borough, Wales
- Died: 5 October 1989 (aged 81) Leamington Spa, England
- School: Pontywaun Grammar School

Rugby union career
- Position: Fly-half
Amateur team(s)
Years	Team	Apps	(Points)
- Abercarn RFC
- Caerleon RFC
1929–1930	London Welsh RFC		
1930–1933	Newport RFC		
International career
Years	Team	Apps	(Points)
1931–1932	Wales	6	(17)
- Rugby league career

Playing information
- Position: Back
Club
Years	Team	Pld	T	G	FG	P
1933–37	Leeds	112	21	0	6	75
	Batley
	Total	112	21	0	6	75
Representative
Years	Team	Pld	T	G	FG	P
1933	Wales	1	0	0	0	0

Albert Raymond "Dicky" Ralph (21 January 1908 – 5 October 1989) was a Welsh international rugby fly-half who played rugby union for Newport and rugby league with Leeds and Batley. He won six caps for Wales at rugby union, and also represented Wales at rugby league.

== Rugby union career ==
Ralph was first capped for Wales against France on 28 February 1931 under the captaincy of Jack Bassett. The game was a walkover, with Wales winning 35–3, Ralph scored two tries of the seven scored by the Welsh team that day and unsurprisingly was reselected two weeks later to face Ireland. In a bruising encounter, Wales won at Ravenhill, with Ralph again on the score sheet, this time with a drop goal. Later that year he faced Bennie Osler's touring South African team twice, once with Newport, and then again in December as part of the Welsh team. Ralph appeared on the losing team on both occasions, though played some strong rugby during the international and his screw kicking on the day was excellent.

In the 1932 Home Nations Championship, Ralph was back in the squad, alongside his Newport team mate Jack Morley. Ralph played all three games, scoring against Ireland with a try and a drop goal. Ralph may have gained further caps, but switched codes to rugby league in 1933, joining Leeds.

== Rugby leagu career ==
On 30 December 1933, Ralph played for the Wales rugby league team in an encounter with Australia, becoming a dual-code international.

Ralph spent four seasons with Leeds, winning two Yorkshire Cups with the club in 1934–35 and 1935–36, and playing in the 1936 Challenge Cup final win against Warrington. He later joined Batley, making his debut for the club in August 1937.

== Bibliography ==
- Billot, John (1974). Springboks in Wales. Ferndale, Glamorgan: Ron Jones Publications.
- Godwin, Terry (1984). The International Rugby Championship 1883-1983. Grafton Street, London: Willow Books. ISBN 0-00-218060-X.
- Smith, David; Williams, Gareth (1980). Fields of Praise: The Official History of The Welsh Rugby Union. Cardiff: University of Wales Press. ISBN 0-7083-0766-3.

Rugby Union Captain
Preceded by Jack Morley	Newport RFC Captain; 1932-1933	Succeeded by Bill Everson
