= WRU Division Six West =

Rugby union league in Wales

- Founded: 2007
- No. of teams: 10
- Country: Wales
- Most recent champion: Penlan RFC (2008–09)
- Level on pyramid: 7
- Website: www.wru.co.uk/14794_14811.php

The Welsh Rugby Union Division Six West (also called the SWALEC Division Six West for sponsorship reasons) is a rugby union league in Wales first implemented for the 2006/07 season.

== Competition ==
There are 10 clubs in the WRU Division Six West. During the course of a season (which lasts from September to May) each club plays the others twice, once at their home ground and once at the home ground of their opponents for a total of 18 games for each club, with a total of 90 games in each season. Teams receive four points for a win and two point for a draw, an additional bonus point is awarded to either team if they score four tries or more in a single match. No points are awarded for a loss though the losing team can gain a bonus point for finishing the match within seven points of the winning team. Teams are ranked by total points, then the number of tries scored and then points difference. At the end of each season, the club with the most points is crowned as champion. If points are equal the tries scored then points difference determines the winner.

=== Sponsorship ===
In 2008 the Welsh Rugby Union announced a new sponsorship deal for the club rugby leagues with SWALEC valued at £1 million (GBP). The initial three year sponsorship was extended at the end of the 2010/11 season, making SWALEC the league sponsors until 2015. The leagues sponsored are the WRU Divisions one through to seven.

- (2007-2008) No sponsor as league created during sponsorship term.
- (2008-2011) SWALEC

== 2010/2011 Season ==
=== League Teams ===
- Blaenau RFC
- Fall Bay RFC
- Llangadog RFC
- Llansawel RFC
- Mynydd y Garegg RFC
- Nantgaredig RFC
- Pantyffynnon RFC
- Penybanc RFC
- South Gower RFC
- Tregaron RFC

== 2009/2010 Season ==
=== League Teams ===
- Blaenau RFC
- Fall Bay RFC
- Llangadog RFC
- Llansawel RFC
- Mynydd y Garegg RFC
- Nantgaredig RFC
- Pantyffynnon RFC
- Penybanc RFC
- South Gower RFC
- Tregaron RFC

== 2008/2009 Season ==
=== League Teams ===
- Aberavon Naval Club RFC
- Fall Bay RFC
- Llangadog RFC
- Nantgaredig RFC
- Pantyffynnon RFC
- Penlan RFC
- Penybanc RFC
- Pontrhydyfen RFC
- South Gower RFC
- Tregaron RFC

=== League table ===
2008-2009 WRU Division Six West League Table
Club	Played	Won	Drawn	Lost	Points for	Points against	Points difference	Bonus Points	Points
Penlan RFC	18	18	0	0	780	165	+615	16	88
Penybanc RFC	18	12	0	6	379	250	+129	9	57
Tregaron RFC	18	11	0	7	418	256	+162	11	55
Nantgaredig RFC	18	11	1	6	347	270	+77	8	54
Fall Bay RFC	18	9	1	8	337	334	+3	5	43
Pontrhydyfen RFC	18	8	0	10	321	430	-109	6	38
Llangadog RFC	18	7	1	10	383	434	-51	7	37
Pantyffynnon RFC	18	7	1	10	343	390	-47	6	36
Aberavon Naval RFC	18	3	0	15	206	518	-312	4	16
South Gower RFC	18	2	0	16	190	657	-467	6	14
Correct as of 17 May 2009

== 2007/2008 Season ==
=== League Teams ===
- Aberavon Naval Club RFC
- Cimla RFC
- Fall Bay RFC
- Llangadog RFC
- Nantgaredig RFC
- Penlan RFC
- Penybanc RFC
- Pontrhydyfen RFC
- South Gower RFC
- Tregaron RFC

=== League table ===
2007-2008 WRU Division Six West League Table
Club	Played	Won	Drawn	Lost	Points for	Points against	Points difference	Bonus Points	Points
Penlan RFC	17	17	0	0	953	58	+895	17	85
Penybanc RFC	18	13	0	5	493	254	+239	10	62
Llangadog RFC	17	12	0	5	434	270	+164	11	59
Fall Bay RFC	18	10	1	7	383	410	-27	6	48
Pontrhydyfen RFC	18	9	0	9	362	431	-69	10	46
Cimla RFC	15	9	0	6	385	315	+70	10	46
Tregaron RFC	17	7	1	9	232	349	-117	4	34
Nantgaredig RFC	18	5	0	13	198	399	-201	7	27
South Gower RFC	18	4	0	14	281	459	-178	6	22
Aberavon Naval RFC	18	0	0	18	89	865	-776	1	1
Correct as of 27 April 2008
