= Edward de Vere Hunt =

Irish rugby union player

- Full name: Edward William Francis de Vere Hunt
- Born: 12 December 1908
- Died: 20 December 1941 (aged 33) Wong Nai Chung Gap, British Hong Kong
- School: Dragon School; Rugby School
- Occupation: Army officer

Rugby union career
- Position: Centre
International career
Years	Team	Apps	(Points)
1930–33	Ireland	5	(6)

Major Edward William Francis de Vere Hunt (12 December 1908 — 20 December 1941) was a British Army officer and Ireland international rugby union player of the 1930s.

Hunt was educated in England at both Dragon School and Rugby School. He attended the Royal Military Academy, Woolwich, straight out of school and in 1929 was commissioned in the Royal Artillery. Posted to Aldershot, Hunt played services rugby and was a Hampshire representative, while gaining five caps for Ireland. He made his Ireland debut at fullback, but was otherwise utilised as a centre, scoring tries against Scotland and England.

By World War II, Hunt had been promoted to the rank of major and was attached to the Hong Kong Singapore Royal Artillery, put in command of the 1st Mountain Battery to defend Hong Kong from the advancing Japanese. He was then put in charge of the Eastern Group Royal Artillery in December 1941 and successfully launched a counter-attack on a Japanese position. The Japanese reclaimed the position while Hunt was back at battle HQ and after returning to his troops was wounded by shelling. He went missing while returning from treatment at a hospital in the Wong Nai Chung Gap and it wasn't until 1944 that he was officially declared to have been killed in action.

== See also ==
- List of Ireland national rugby union players
