= Bert Jones (rugby, born 1906) =

Wales international rugby union & league footballer

Personal information
- Full name: William Herbert Jones
- Born: 1 May 1906 Llanelli, Wales
- Died: 31 July 1982 (aged 76) Pontyberem, Wales

Playing information
- Weight: 11 st 4 lb (72 kg)

Rugby union
- Position: Scrum-half
Club
Years	Team	Pld	T	G	FG	P
	Pontyberem RFC
≤1934–34	Llanelli RFC
	Total	0	0	0	0	0
Representative
Years	Team	Pld	T	G	FG	P
1934	Wales	2	0	0	0	0

Rugby league
- Position: Scrum-half
Club
Years	Team	Pld	T	G	FG	P
1934	St. Helens	14	1	0	0	3
- Source: scrum.com

William Herbert Jones (born 1 May 1906 – died 31 July 1982 (aged 76) Pontyberem) was a Welsh rugby union, and professional rugby league footballer who played in the 1930s.

== Biography ==
Jones was born in Llanelli, Wales on 1 May 1906.

He played representative level rugby union (RU) for Wales, and at club level for Llanelli RFC, as a Scrum-half, and club level rugby league (RL) for St. Helens, as a scrum-half.

== International honours ==
Bert Jones won caps for Wales (RU) while at Llanelli RFC in 1934 against Scotland, and Ireland.
