= Ron Herrera (rugby union) =

- Full name: Ronald Cecil Herrera
- Born: 16 January 1905 Wattsville, Wales
- Died: 16 March 1973 (aged 68) Newport, Wales

Rugby union career
- Position: Forward
International career
Years	Team	Apps	(Points)
1925–27	Wales	8	(6)

Ronald Cecil Herrera (16 January 1905 – 16 March 1973) was a Welsh international rugby union player.

Herrera hailed from Wattsville, near Crosskeys, and began playing senior rugby in 1921–22.

A forward, Herrera had a quick rise in rugby and gained his first Wales call up in 1925, within a year of having been in the Cross Keys reserves. He was capped eight times for Wales and scored two tries. By the end of his international career, Herrera had transferred to Newport RFC, upon joining the Newport Borough Police. He retired from rugby in 1931.

== See also ==
- List of Wales national rugby union players
