= Hal Withers =

Irish rugby union player

Hal Withers DSO
- Full name: Henry Hastings Cavendish Withers
- Born: 11 October 1904 Bengal, India
- Died: 6 September 1948 (aged 43) Millbank, London, England
- School: Cheltenham College
- Occupation: Army officer / Engineer

Rugby union career
- Position: No. 8
International career
Years	Team	Apps	(Points)
1931	Ireland	5	(0)

Henry Hastings Cavendish Withers (11 October 1904 — 6 September 1948) was a British Army officer, engineer and Ireland international rugby union player of the 1930s.

The son of an Army colonel, Withers was born in Bengal and educated at Cheltenham College.

Withers, a forward, was a product of Army rugby and gained five Ireland caps. He played all of Ireland's 1931 Five Nations fixtures and featured against the touring Springboks at the end of the year.

A graduate of the Royal Military Academy, Woolwich, Withers was commissioned into the Royal Engineers and posted to India in 1934. He served as a garrison engineer in Quetta and in 1940 was decorated with Distinguished Service Order for "gallant and distinguished services" on active service during World War II.

== See also ==
- List of Ireland national rugby union players
