= Idwal Rees =

- Born: John Idwal Rees; 25 July 1910 Swansea, Wales
- Died: 31 August 1991 (aged 81) Cefn Coed, Wales
- School: Swansea Grammar School
- University: Swansea University
- Occupation: Headmaster

Rugby union career
- Position(s): Wing, Centre
Amateur team(s)
Years	Team	Apps	(Points)
1928-1938	Swansea RFC		
1931-1932	Cambridge University R.U.F.C.		
- London Welsh RFC
1932-?	Edinburgh Wanderers		
1934-36	Barbarian F.C.		
International career
Years	Team	Apps	(Points)
1934–1938	Wales	14	(6)

John Idwal Rees (25 July 1910 – 31 August 1991) was a Welsh international rugby union centre who played club rugby for Swansea and Cambridge University. He was capped 14 times for Wales captaining the team on two occasions.

== Personal history ==
Rees was born in Swansea, south Wales in 1910. He was educated at Swansea Grammar School before matriculating to Swansea University at the age of 17. In October 1931 he gained a place at Cambridge University, and from there obtained a job teaching at Fettes College. In 1938 he returned to Wales becoming headmaster of Cowbridge Grammar School, a role he held until his retirement in 1971. Rees also released a book, Rugger Practice and Tactics, co-authored with H. F. Macdonald.

== Rugby career ==
Rees first played rugby for Swansea Grammar School, but when he graduated to Swansea University at the age of 17, he gave up rugby as he believed he was too light to play. In 1928/29 season he joined Swansea University RFC, playing alongside future Welsh internationals, Watcyn Thomas and Claude Davey. Rees played for Swansea in the 1929/30 season, moving from scrum-half to full-back to centre; but in October 1931 he went to Cambridge where he achieved his rugby 'blue' in 1931 and 1932.

When Rees obtained a job at Fettes College he played for Edinburgh Wanderers, but during the school holidays he returned to Wales, playing for Swansea.

=== International matches played ===
Wales

- England 1934, 1936, 1937, 1938
- Ireland 1934, 1936, 1937, 1938
- New Zealand 1935
- Scotland 1934, 1935, 1936, 1937, 1938

== Bibliography ==
- Smith, David; Williams, Gareth (1980). Fields of Praise: The Official History of The Welsh Rugby Union. Cardiff: University of Wales Press. ISBN 0-7083-0766-3.
- Thomas, Wayne (1979). A Century of Welsh Rugby Players. Ansells Ltd.
