= Jack Morley =

Welsh rugby union and rugby league footballer

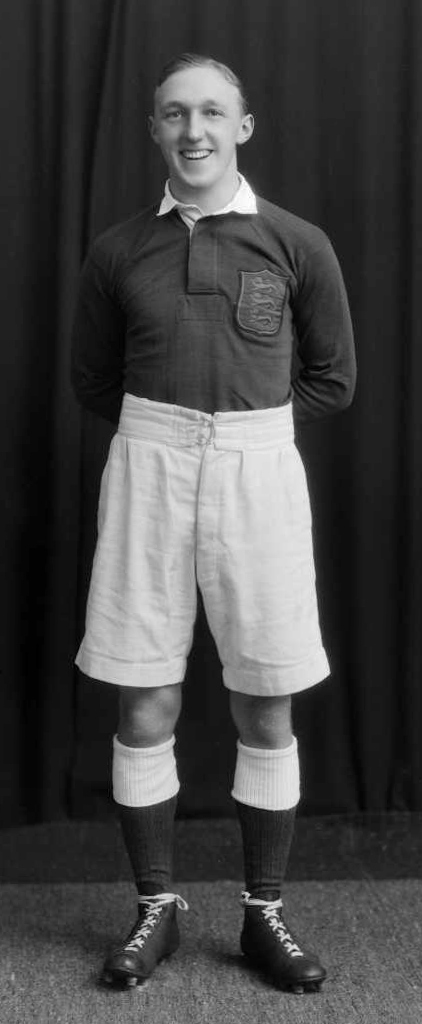
- Morley in New Zealand in 1930
- Born: John Cuthbert Morley; 28 July 1909 Newport, Wales
- Died: 7 March 1972 (aged 62) Newport, Wales
- Height: 5 ft 7 in (170 cm)
- Weight: 11 st 8 lb (162 lb; 73 kg)
- School: Newport Secondary School
- Occupation: Dentist

Rugby union career
- Position: Wing
Amateur team(s)
Years	Team	Apps	(Points)
1927–32	Newport RFC		
1928, '29, '31	Crawshays RFC		
International career
Years	Team	Apps	(Points)
- Welsh Schools
1929–32	Wales	14	(15)
1930	British Lions	3	(3)
- Rugby league career

Playing information
- Position: Back
Club
Years	Team	Pld	T	G	FG	P
1932–39	Wigan	292				677
Representative
Years	Team	Pld	T	G	FG	P
1933–37	Great Britain	3				3
1932–36	Wales	5				15

John Cuthbert Morley (28 July 1909 – 7 March 1972) was a Welsh international rugby wing who played rugby union for Newport and rugby league with Wigan. He won 14 caps for Wales in union, and five caps for Wales in rugby league, and was the first player to tour Australia and New Zealand for both union, and league British teams.

Morley, although mainly a wing player was often used as a utility back, and was known for his incredible pace and ability to change direction at speed. He was an intelligent but unorthodox player.

== Rugby union ==
Morley first represented Wales as a schoolboy, and after leaving Newport Municipal Secondary School he joined Newport. In his first season with the club he scored 29 tries, and by 1931 was captain of the senior Newport team, at the age of 21 he was the youngest player to be given the honour. He captained Newport against the touring South Africans at Rodney Parade on 8 October 1931, and set up Ken Richards for a try after a typical zigzag run. The South Africans took note of Morley and attempted to ensure he wasn't given the space to run at them for the rest of the game. In August 1932 he switched to rugby league, leaving Newport for Wigan.

Morley was first capped for Wales against England on 19 January 1929 and although he finished on the losing side he did manage to score a try on his début, when he received the ball forty yards out, broke infield and crossed wide, after cutting back inside to score. He retained his place and played in the remaining three games of the Championship. After playing in two matches of the 1930 tournament, he played in all four matches of Wales's Championship winning 1932 campaign. Morley scored in all but one of the matches, surprisingly the game he failed to score was against France, when Wales were rampant and his team mates scored seven tries. Morley was capped 14 times for Wales and his final game was against Ireland at the Cardiff Arms Park in 1932. He would probably have been chosen for future teams as he was still a young exciting player, but his decision to join a professional league side made him ineligible for future Welsh games.

=== International matches played under union code ===
Wales

- England 1929, 1930, 1931, 1932
- France 1929, 1931
- Ireland 1929, 1930, 1931, 1932
- Scotland 1929, 1931, 1932
- South Africa 1931

British Lions

- New Zealand New Zealand 1930, 1930, 1930

== Rugby league ==
Morley played on the wing, and scored a try in Wigan's 15–3 victory over Salford in the Championship Final during the 1933–34 season at Wilderspool Stadium, Warrington on Saturday 28 April 1934 .

Morley played on the wing in Wigan's 10–7 victory over Salford in the 1938–39 Lancashire Cup Final during the 1938–39 season at Station Road, Swinton on Saturday 22 October 1938.

Morley played on the wing, and scored two tries in Wigan's 30–27 victory over France at Central Park, Wigan, on Saturday 10 March 1934.

=== International matches played under league code ===
Great Britain

- Australia 1933, 1936, 1937

Wales

- England 1932, 1936
- France 1935, 1935
- Australia 1933

== Bibliography ==
- Billot, John (1974). Springboks in Wales. Ferndale, Glamorgan: Ron Jones Publications.
- Godwin, Terry (1984). The International Rugby Championship 1883–1983. Grafton Street, London: Willow Books. ISBN 0-00-218060-X.
- Smith, David; Williams, Gareth (1980). Fields of Praise: The Official History of The Welsh Rugby Union. Cardiff: University of Wales Press. ISBN 0-7083-0766-3.

Rugby Union Captain
Preceded by Bill Everson	Newport RFC Captain; 1931–1932	Succeeded by Dicky Ralph
