= Harry Peacock (rugby union) =

Wales international rugby union player

- Born: Harry Peacock; 14 February 1909 Newport, Wales
- Died: 6 March 1996 (aged 87) France
- School: Municipal Secondary School, Newport; St. Woolos School, Newport
- Occupation: Police officer

Rugby union career
- Position(s): Flanker, Number 8
Amateur team(s)
Years	Team	Apps	(Points)
- Pontypool RFC
1925-1932	Newport RFC		
1929-1930	Crawshays RFC		
International career
Years	Team	Apps	(Points)
1929-30	Wales	6	(6)

Harry Peacock (14 February 1909 – 6 March 1996) was a Welsh international rugby union flanker who played rugby union for Newport. He won six caps for Wales and faced two international touring teams with Newport.

Peacock played with several club and invitational teams throughout his rugby career. His first major club team was Pontypool, before moving to Newport in 1925. While with Newport, Peacock faced the touring New South Wales Waratahs in 1927 and he was chosen to play against the 1931 touring South Africans. As a police officer, he was also selected to play with police teams such as the Monmouthshire Police and also turned out for invitational team Crawshays.

== Personal history ==
Born in Newport in 1909, Peacock was educated at St Woolos School and then Municipal Secondary School. From school he became an apprentice engineer before then joining the Monmouthshire Constabulary as a police officer. He joined the British Army in 1943, remaining in the Forces until 1946, holding the rank of major on demobilisation. He was seconded to the Allied Military Government for Germany, where he served for 11 years. On retirement he moved to Jersey, dying in France in 1996.

== International career ==
Peacock was first capped for Wales against Scotland on 2 February 1929 at St Helens. Wales beat the Scottish team, and in doing so denied the Scots the Grand Slam. Peacock scored a try on his debut and was selected to play in the next two games of the Championship under the captaincy of Guy Morgan. The next season Peacock was not selected for the opening game of the 1930 Five Nations Championship against England, but again was selected for the remaining games against Scotland, Ireland, and France. Although losing to Scotland, Wales won the next two games. During the game against Ireland, Peacock scored a joint try with Swansea's Howie Jones; both men dived for the ball and the referee could not decide on the actual scorer. The record books show the try as a joint score. The final game of the tournament was against France and Wales won an overly violent match to finish the Championship in second place behind England. This was Peacock's last game for Wales.

=== International matches played ===
Wales

- France 1929, 1930
- Ireland 1929, 1930
- Scotland 1929, 1930

== Bibliography ==
- Billot, John (1974). Springboks in Wales. Ferndale, Glamorgan: Ron Jones Publications.
- Godwin, Terry (1984). The International Rugby Championship 1883-1983. Grafton Street, London: Willow Books. ISBN 0-00-218060-X.
- Smith, David; Williams, Gareth (1980). Fields of Praise: The Official History of The Welsh Rugby Union. Cardiff: University of Wales Press. ISBN 0-7083-0766-3.
