= Jack Bassett =

British Lions & Wales international rugby union footballer

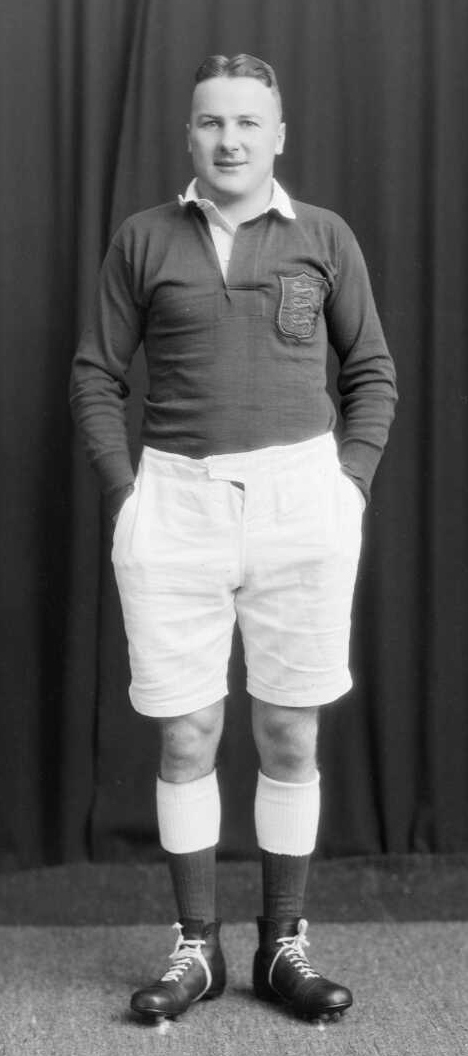
- Bassett in New Zealand in 1930
- Born: John Archibald Bassett; 11 July 1905 Trebanog, Wales
- Died: 19 February 1989 (aged 83) Cardiff, Wales
- Height: 5 ft 10 1/2 in (179 cm)
- Weight: 13 st 7 lb (189 lb; 86 kg)
- Notable relative: Arthur Bassett (brother)
- Occupation: Police officer

Rugby union career
- Position: Full back
Amateur team(s)
Years	Team	Apps	(Points)
- Kenfig Hill RFC
- Pyle RFC
- Aberavon RFC
1924–1934	Penarth RFC		
1930–1931	Barbarian F.C.		
1934–1936	Cardiff Athletic RFC		
–	Glamorgan Police RFC		
International career
Years	Team	Apps	(Points)
- Welsh Schools
1929–1932	Wales	15	(29)
1930	British Lions	5	(0)

Jack Bassett (11 July 1905 – 19 February 1989) was a Welsh international rugby union full back who played club rugby for Penarth. He won 15 caps for Wales and was selected for the 1930 British Lions tour of Australia and New Zealand. He captained the Welsh team on nine occasions.

Bassett was not the fastest full back, but had a great positional sense on the field which ensured he was always close to the action. He was seen as one of the most devastating tacklers in the game, and many opposing backs would throw the ball into touch rather than allow Bassett to hit them in full flow.

== Club career ==
Bassett began playing rugby with Kenfig Hill and Pyle before playing a handful of games with Aberavon. He joined the Glamorgan Constabulary in 1924 and found himself stationed in Penarth. From his new town, Bassett played for both the Police XV and Penarth. Although playing for an "unfavourable" club, the Wales full back position became free during the 1928/29 season and the selectors decided to choose the player from the Newport vs Penarth game. Although Newport won the game, Bassett had the better game over Newport's Bill Everson, and was chosen to represent his country.

== International career ==
Bassett was first capped for Wales against England on 19 January 1929 at Twickenham. Although Wales lost the match Bassett retained his place and played in the remaining three games of the Championship. Bassett played all four games in the 1930 Five Nations Championship, and in the third game against Ireland, Bassett was given the captaincy of Wales for the first time, and also gained his first international points with a drop goal. Bassett had one of his best games against Ireland, with superb defensive play and decisive tackling, saving three tries during the game. The final game of the tournament was a vicious affair against a pugilistic French team, but Bassett missed the match as he had been chosen to tour with the British Lions and was already on his way to Australia.

Bassett had an exceptional tour with the Lions and was acclaimed as the greatest full back in World rugby, even outplaying New Zealand legend George Nēpia. Bassett played well for the Lions, earning five caps with clean work in the open, tidying up the British defence to allow good attacking play.

In 1931, Bassett led the Welsh team to their first Championship since 1922, beating France, Ireland and Scotland, and drawing with England at Twickenham. Bassett was also chosen to captain Wales against the 1931 touring South Africans, but when Wales lost he was blamed for not controlling the play from behind the scrummage which saw risky passing and absurd decisions, in a windy and wet match, that the South Africans exploited.

Despite the criticism levelled against him after the South African game, Bassett was selected continue in his captaincy of Wales in the 1932 Championship. Wales beat both England and Scotland, but in the game against Ireland, Bassett had a terrible match which ended his international career. With home advantage and the Triple Crown in sight, Wales were expected to beat the Irish team. Bassett though dropped the ball on his own 25, which Ireland's Edward Lightfoot gathered to score a try. Later in the game Shaun Waide picked up a lucky bounce from an offside position, running 80 yards to score, easily beating Bassett in the process. When Dicky Ralph scored for Wales at the end of the game, Bassett missed the resulting conversion, and ultimately the Triple Crown.

=== International matches played ===
Wales

- England 1929, 1930, 1931, 1932
- France 1929, 1931
- Ireland 1929, 1930, 1931, 1932
- Scotland 1929, 1930, 1931, 1932
- South Africa 1931

British Lions

- Australia 1930
- New Zealand 1930, 1930, 1930, 1930
