= Bennie Osler =

South African rugby union player

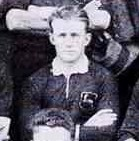
- Born: Benjamin Louwrens Osler; 23 November 1901 Aliwal North, Cape Colony
- Died: 23 April 1962 (aged 60)
- Height: 1.73 m (5 ft 8 in)
- Weight: 70 kg (154 lb)
- School: Rondebosch Boys High, CapeTown and Kingswood College, Grahamstown

Rugby union career
- Position: Fly-half
Provincial / State sides
Years	Team	Apps	(Points)
- Western Province
- Correct as of 2007-11-29
International career
Years	Team	Apps	(Points)
1924–33	South Africa	17	(46)
- Correct as of 2007-11-29

Benjamin Louwrens Osler (23 November 1901 – 28 April 1962) was a rugby union footballer who played internationally for South Africa. Osler played mainly at fly-half for both South Africa, and his provincial team of Western Province.

Osler was born at Aliwal North. He was first selected to play on 16 August 1924 against the Lions when they toured South Africa. This was the first of his 17 consecutive Test appearances for South Africa. Osler played in the other three Tests of the Lions tour, and contributed to South Africa winning three of the four Tests. The only Test of the series the Springboks did not win was their 3–3 draw in Port Elizabeth where Osler was temporarily knocked out.

The next Springbok (as the South African team is known) series was hosting New Zealand's All Blacks in 1928. The teams had met once before in a Test series, drawn 1–1 (with 1 match drawn) in New Zealand in 1921. The first Test was played in Durban and the Springboks won 17–0, with Osler scoring a world record 14 points in the match. Osler played in the remaining three Tests and the series was eventually drawn 2–2; just like in 1921.

Osler's first overseas tour was in 1931 when he captained the Springboks on their 1931–32 tour to the Home Nations. He captained the team and played in all four Tests; playing against England, Ireland, Scotland and Wales. Osler's Springboks became the second South African team, and only second of all time, to win a Grand Slam—a win over all four Home Nations on one tour. The tour continued into 1932 and the team eventually played 26 matches, with only one loss.

In 1933 Osler played in his last Test series when Australia toured South Africa. They played a five match series and Osler played in all five Tests, with the Springboks winning the series by 3 tests to 2. During the series he scored a try, conversion and drop-goal.

Osler is remembered as a fly-half who played a kicking game; that is, he would often kick for territory rather than run with the ball, or pass to his backs. His accuracy when kicking allowed South African teams he was in to play a forward oriented game, commonly referred to as ten-man rugby. His contributions to international rugby were acknowledged with his induction into the International Rugby Hall of Fame in 2007 and the IRB Hall of Fame in 2009.

Sporting positions
Preceded by Phil Mostert	Springbok Captain; 1931–33	Succeeded by Philip J. Nel
