= Claude Davey =

Wales international rugby union footballer

- Born: Claude Davey; 14 December 1908 Garnant, Wales
- Died: 18 February 2001 (aged 92) Brecon, Wales
- School: Ystalyfera Comprehensive
- University: Swansea University

Rugby union career
- Position: Centre
Amateur team(s)
Years	Team	Apps	(Points)
- Cwmgors RFC
1928-1930	Swansea RFC		
1930-1935	Sale FC		
- London Welsh
1936-1937	Barbarian F.C.		
International career
Years	Team	Apps	(Points)
1930-1938	Wales	23	(15)

Claude Davey (14 December 1908 – 18 February 2001) was a Wales international rugby union player who played club rugby for several teams, most notably Sale and Swansea. He was awarded 23 caps for Wales and captained his country eight times. Davey was a hard tackling centre and his most famous performance took place on 21 December 1935 when he led Wales to a historic 13–12 victory over the All Blacks at Cardiff.

== Early career ==
Davey was one of the outstanding Welsh players of his generation, known for his impressive crash-tackling and strong running ability. He was often criticised for poor handling, but Davey tended to run onto the ball at speed requiring not only good timing but good passing from his teammates. When it failed it was classed as 'bad hands' but when it worked Davey would make distinct attacking headway. This style of play was described in 1930 by the Llanelly Mercury as 'he can do nothing except emulate a battering ram, and too often he forgets to take the ball with him'.

Davey first came to notice while playing for the Wales Secondary Schools, before gaining a place for a Wales University XV, while he was studying electrical engineering at Swansea University. His first club team, was 'the Mond' a colliery team that would later become Cwmgors, moving to Swansea in 1928. His first game for Swansea came in December of the same year against Skewen.

== International rugby ==
Davey was called up for Wales at the end of the 1929/30 season in the final game of the tournament against France. In an extremely rough match Davey made a very good impression. He was called upon again the next season, though at this time he was playing for Sale. Davey made a name for himself in the 1931 game against Ireland in Belfast. Ireland only need to beat Wales to win the Triple Crown, but Davey and Jack Bassett tackled with such brutal aggression that the opposite centre retired with concussion and his replacement was later knocked unconscious. Davey not only subdued the Irish on their own soil but also scored a try himself and put his wing in for two more.

He first captained Wales against Scotland in 1934, and would captain his nation a further seven times.

=== International matches played ===
Wales

- England 1931, 1932, 1933, 1934, 1935, 1937, 1938
- France 1930, 1931
- Ireland 1931, 1932, 1934, 1935, 1937, 1938
- New Zealand 1935
- Scotland 1931, 1932, 1933, 1934, 1935, 1936
- South Africa 1931

== Bibliography ==
- Smith, David; Williams, Gareth (1980). Fields of Praise: The Official History of The Welsh Rugby Union. Cardiff: University of Wales Press. ISBN 0-7083-0766-3.
- Thomas, Wayne (1979). A Century of Welsh Rugby Players. Ansells Ltd.
