= WRU Division Four East =

Rugby union league in Wales

- Founded: 1995
- No. of teams: 12
- Country: Wales
- Most recent champion: Chepstow RFC (2022-23)
- Level on pyramid: 5
- Promotion to: WRU Division Three East
- Relegation to: WRU Division Five East
- Website: www.wru.co.uk/1153_2136.php

The Welsh Rugby Union Division Four East (also called the SWALEC Division Four East for sponsorship reasons) is a rugby union league in Wales.

== Competition ==
There are 12 clubs in the WRU Division Four East. During the course of a season (which lasts from September to May) each club plays the others twice, once at their home ground and once at the Hpme ground of their opponents for a total of 22 games for each club, with a total of 132 games in each season. Teams receive four points for a win and two point for a draw, an additional bonus point is awarded to either team if they score four tries or more in a single match. No points are awarded for a loss though the losing team can gain a bonus point for finishing the match within seven points of the winning team. Teams are ranked by total points, then the number of tries scored and then points difference. At the end of each season, the club with the most points is crowned as champion. If points are equal the tries scored then points difference determines the winner. The team who is declared champion at the end of the season is eligible for promotion to the WRU Division Three East. The two lowest placed teams are relegated into the WRU Division Five East.

=== Sponsorship ===
In 2008 the Welsh Rugby Union announced a new sponsorship deal for the club rugby leagues with SWALEC valued at £1 million (GBP). The initial three year sponsorship was extended at the end of the 2010/11 season, making SWALEC the league sponsors until 2015. The leagues sponsored are the WRU Divisions one through to seven.

- (2002–2005) Lloyds TSB
- (2005–2008) Asda
- (2008–2015) SWALEC

== 2011/2012 Season ==
=== League teams ===
- Abercarn RFC
- Blaenavon RFC
- Blaina RFC
- Caldicot RFC
- Cardiff HSOB RFC
- Chepstow RFC
- Cwmbran RFC
- Machen RFC
- New Tredegar RFC
- Oakdale RFC
- Taffs Well RFC
- Talywain RFC

=== 2011/2012 Table ===
2011-2012 WRU Division Four East League Table
| | Club | Played | Won | Drawn | Lost | Points for | Points against | Tries for | Tries against | Try bonus | Losing bonus | Points |
| 1 | Cardiff HSOB RFC | 22 | 16 | 0 | 6 | 699 | 358 | 98 | 47 | 10 | 4 | 78 |
| 2 | Talywain RFC | 22 | 16 | 2 | 4 | 525 | 224 | 78 | 24 | 8 | 2 | 78 |
| 3 | Abercarn RFC | 22 | 16 | 0 | 6 | 605 | 271 | 75 | 29 | 6 | 4 | 74 |
| 4 | Cwmbran RFC | 22 | 13 | 0 | 9 | 563 | 399 | 85 | 53 | 10 | 4 | 66 |
| 5 | Caldicot RFC | 22 | 12 | 0 | 10 | 632 | 395 | 96 | 52 | 11 | 5 | 64 |
| 6 | New Tredegar RFC | 22 | 12 | 1 | 9 | 570 | 430 | 77 | 56 | 9 | 3 | 62 |
| 7 | Blaenavon RFC | 22 | 12 | 0 | 10 | 519 | 381 | 70 | 48 | 8 | 4 | 60 |
| 8 | Chepstow RFC | 22 | 12 | 1 | 9 | 454 | 371 | 64 | 53 | 6 | 4 | 60 |
| 9 | Oakdale RFC | 22 | 9 | 1 | 12 | 447 | 480 | 57 | 58 | 4 | 3 | 45 |
| 10 | Machen RFC | 22 | 8 | 2 | 12 | 513 | 495 | 61 | 74 | 4 | 5 | 45 |
| 11 | Taffs Well RFC | 22 | 2 | 1 | 19 | 303 | 749 | 37 | 105 | 3 | 6 | 19 |
| 12 | Blaina RFC | 22 | 0 | 0 | 22 | 110 | 1387 | 14 | 213 | 2 | 1 | 3 |
| Correct as of 29 May 2012 | | | | | | | | | | | | |

== 2010/2011 Season ==
=== League teams ===
- Abercarn RFC
- Blaenavon RFC
- Chepstow RFC
- Crumlin RFC
- Cwmbran RFC
- Machen RFC
- Nantyglo RFC
- Nelson RFC
- New Tredegar RFC
- Oakdale RFC
- Senghenydd RFC
- Talywain RFC

=== 2010/2011 Table ===
2010-2011 WRU Division Four East League Table
| | Club | Played | Won | Drawn | Lost | Points for | Points against | Tries for | Tries against | Try bonus | Losing bonus | Points |
| 1 | Senghenydd RFC | 22 | 21 | 0 | 1 | 748 | 237 | 106 | 28 | 17 | 1 | 102 |
| 2 | Nelson RFC | 22 | 18 | 0 | 4 | 674 | 376 | 93 | 45 | 12 | 1 | 85 |
| 3 | Cwmbran RFC | 22 | 13 | 1 | 8 | 582 | 361 | 88 | 45 | 13 | 5 | 72 |
| 4 | Blaenavon RFC | 22 | 13 | 1 | 8 | 426 | 462 | 51 | 57 | 7 | 1 | 62 |
| 5 | Chepstow RFC | 22 | 11 | 1 | 10 | 382 | 527 | 53 | 73 | 7 | 2 | 55 |
| 6 | Abercarn RFC | 22 | 10 | 2 | 10 | 452 | 419 | 49 | 55 | 6 | 4 | 54 |
| 7 | New Tredegar RFC | 22 | 9 | 0 | 13 | 525 | 534 | 71 | 69 | 9 | 6 | 51 |
| 8 | Machen RFC | 22 | 8 | 1 | 13 | 402 | 551 | 47 | 75 | 4 | 5 | 43 |
| 9 | Oakdale RFC | 22 | 7 | 2 | 13 | 409 | 567 | 48 | 68 | 5 | 4 | 41 |
| 10 | Nantyglo RFC | 22 | 6 | 1 | 15 | 420 | 551 | 49 | 70 | 5 | 7 | 38 |
| 11 | Talywain RFC | 22 | 7 | 1 | 14 | 353 | 426 | 39 | 52 | 2 | 5 | 37 |
| 12 | Crumlin RFC | 22 | 4 | 0 | 18 | 317 | 679 | 40 | 97 | 2 | 5 | 23 |
| Correct as of 29 May 2012 | | | | | | | | | | | | |

== 2009/2010 Season ==
=== League teams ===
- Abertillery RFC
- Abercarn RFC
- Chepstow RFC
- Crumlin RFC
- Machen RFC
- Monmouth RFC
- Nantyglo RFC
- New Tredegar RFC
- Old Illtydians RFC
- Risca RFC
- St. Joseph's RFC
- Talywain RFC

=== 2009/2010 table ===
2009-2010 WRU Division Four League East Table
| Club | Played | Won | Drawn | Lost | Points for | Points against | Tries for | Tries against | Try bonus | Losing bonus | Points |
| Risca RFC | 22 | 19 | 1 | 2 | 587 | 263 | 73 | 34 | 5 | 2 | 85 |
| Abertillery RFC | 22 | 18 | 0 | 4 | 530 | 275 | 64 | 34 | 7 | 3 | 82 |
| Talywain RFC | 22 | 17 | 2 | 3 | 432 | 261 | 57 | 27 | 4 | 3 | 79 |
| New Tredegar RFC | 22 | 13 | 0 | 9 | 480 | 344 | 68 | 49 | 6 | 5 | 63 |
| Chepstow RFC | 22 | 9 | 1 | 12 | 388 | 460 | 52 | 57 | 5 | 2 | 45 |
| Crumlin RFC | 22 | 9 | 0 | 13 | 362 | 462 | 47 | 53 | 3 | 3 | 42 |
| Machen RFC | 22 | 8 | 0 | 14 | 385 | 475 | 44 | 54 | 2 | 7 | 41 |
| Nantyglo RFC | 22 | 8 | 1 | 13 | 297 | 399 | 39 | 43 | 3 | 4 | 41 |
| Abercarn RFC | 22 | 7 | 1 | 14 | 351 | 398 | 43 | 51 | 2 | 7 | 39 |
| St. Joseph's RFC | 22 | 7 | 1 | 14 | 269 | 460 | 33 | 58 | 0 | 5 | 35 |
| Monmouth RFC | 22 | 7 | 1 | 14 | 292 | 454 | 25 | 66 | 1 | 4 | 35 |
| Old Illtydians RFC | 22 | 5 | 2 | 15 | 319 | 441 | 36 | 55 | 4 | 7 | 35 |
Correct as of 3 August 2010

== 2008/2009 Season ==
=== League teams ===
- Brynithel RFC
- Chepstow RFC
- Crumlin RFC
- Llandaff RFC
- Machen RFC
- Monmouth RFC
- Nantyglo RFC
- Pontllanfraith RFC
- Rhiwbina RFC
- Risca RFC
- St. Joseph's RFC
- Tredegar Ironsides RFC

=== 2008/2009 table ===
2008-2009 WRU Division Four League East Table
| Club | Played | Won | Drawn | Lost | Points for | Points against | Tries for | Tries against | Try bonus | Losing bonus | Points |
| Llandaff RFC | 22 | 19 | 0 | 3 | 529 | 212 | 81 | 26 | 9 | 3 | 88 |
| Tredegar Ironsides RFC | 22 | 18 | 1 | 3 | 726 | 196 | 107 | 18 | 10 | 1 | 85 |
| Nantyglo RFC | 22 | 15 | 0 | 7 | 493 | 382 | 67 | 45 | 8 | 5 | 73 |
| Risca RFC | 22 | 12 | 1 | 9 | 462 | 344 | 53 | 41 | 8 | 4 | 62 |
| Rhiwbina RFC | 21 | 11 | 0 | 10 | 431 | 307 | 62 | 38 | 8 | 8 | 60 |
| Crumlin RFC | 22 | 12 | 2 | 8 | 415 | 370 | 55 | 47 | 4 | 3 | 59 |
| Machen RFC | 22 | 11 | 1 | 10 | 533 | 454 | 63 | 61 | 5 | 3 | 50 |
| St. Joseph's RFC | 22 | 10 | 0 | 12 | 353 | 371 | 38 | 43 | 3 | 3 | 46 |
| Monmouth RFC | 22 | 8 | 2 | 12 | 365 | 437 | 45 | 61 | 4 | 4 | 44 |
| Chepstow RFC | 22 | 5 | 1 | 16 | 371 | 507 | 49 | 70 | 2 | 6 | 30 |
| Brynithel RFC | 22 | 5 | 0 | 17 | 201 | 526 | 24 | 71 | 1 | 3 | 24 |
| Pontllanfraith RFC | 21 | 1 | 0 | 20 | 91 | 864 | 11 | 134 | 0 | 1 | 5 |
Correct as of 2009-06-05

== 2007/2008 Season ==
=== League teams ===
- Abercarn RFC
- Abertillery/Blaenau Gwent RFC
- Brynithel RFC
- Gwernyfed RFC
- Llandaff RFC
- Machen RFC
- Monmouth RFC
- Nantyglo RFC
- Rhiwbina RFC
- Risca RFC
- Talywain RFC
- Tredegar Ironsides RFC

=== 2007/2008 table ===
2007-2008 WRU Division Four League East Table
| Club | Played | Won | Drawn | Lost | Points for | Points against | Tries for | Tries against | Try bonus | Losing bonus | Points |
| Gwernyfed RFC | 20 | 18 | 0 | 2 | 536 | 183 | 73 | 22 | 11 | 1 | 84 |
| Abertillery/Blaenau Gwent RFC | 20 | 15 | 1 | 4 | 423 | 208 | 55 | 24 | 5 | 3 | 70 |
| Nantyglo RFC | 20 | 14 | 1 | 5 | 370 | 213 | 51 | 27 | 6 | 3 | 67 |
| Llandaff RFC | 20 | 12 | 0 | 8 | 382 | 288 | 54 | 41 | 6 | 3 | 57 |
| Rhiwbina RFC | 20 | 11 | 0 | 9 | 372 | 317 | 51 | 41 | 6 | 6 | 56 |
| Risca RFC | 20 | 10 | 0 | 10 | 386 | 271 | 53 | 37 | 6 | 8 | 54 |
| Tredegar Ironsides RFC | 20 | 8 | 1 | 11 | 278 | 314 | 32 | 37 | 2 | 7 | 43 |
| Brynithel RFC | 20 | 7 | 1 | 12 | 206 | 454 | 22 | 65 | 0 | 2 | 32 |
| Monmouth RFC | 20 | 6 | 0 | 14 | 220 | 402 | 27 | 55 | 2 | 3 | 29 |
| Machen RFC | 20 | 3 | 1 | 16 | 259 | 552 | 38 | 76 | 4 | 5 | 23 |
| Abercarn RFC | 20 | 3 | 1 | 16 | 177 | 407 | 23 | 54 | 1 | 4 | 19 |
| Talywain RFC* | 0 | 0 | 0 | 0 | 0 | 0 | 0 | 0 | 0 | 0 | 0 |
Correct as of 2008-06-01

* Although Talywain RFC played out almost all matches for the 2007–08 season they withdrew from the league before the end of the season. All games played against Talywain by the other teams in the league were classed as null and void.

== 2006/2007 Season ==
=== League teams ===
- Brynithel RFC
- Crumlin RFC
- Garndiffaith RFC
- Llandaff RFC
- Llandaff North RFC
- Machen RFC
- Monmouth RFC
- Nantyglo RFC
- Old Illtydians RFC
- Risca RFC
- Talywain RFC
- Tredegar Ironsides RFC
- Trinant RFC

=== 2006/2007 Table ===
2006-07 WRU Division Four East League Table
| Club | Played | Won | Drawn | Lost | Points for | Points against | Tries for | Points |
| Garndiffaith RFC | 22 | 19 | 0 | 3 | 718 | 277 | 110 | 57 |
| Old Illtydians RFC | 22 | 19 | 0 | 3 | 536 | 342 | 77 | 57 |
| Nantyglo RFC | 22 | 15 | 0 | 7 | 546 | 374 | 73 | 45 |
| Monmouth RFC | 22 | 15 | 0 | 7 | 515 | 347 | 68 | 45 |
| Llandaff RFC | 22 | 12 | 0 | 10 | 475 | 384 | 68 | 36 |
| Risca RFC | 22 | 10 | 2 | 10 | 440 | 398 | 54 | 32 |
| Tredegar Ironsides RFC | 22 | 10 | 0 | 12 | 349 | 440 | 51 | 30 |
| Machen RFC | 22 | 8 | 2 | 12 | 345 | 404 | 49 | 26 |
| Llandaff North RFC | 22 | 7 | 2 | 13 | 481 | 523 | 66 | 23 |
| Talywain RFC | 22 | 6 | 0 | 16 | 267 | 577 | 36 | 18 |
| Crumlin RFC | 22 | 4 | 1 | 17 | 310 | 588 | 45 | 13 |
| Trinant RFC | 22 | 3 | 1 | 18 | 270 | 598 | 23 | 10 |
Correct as of 2007-08-15
