= Caerphilly County Borough =

County borough in Wales

Caerphilly County Borough Bwrdeistref Sirol Caerffili (Welsh)
- County borough
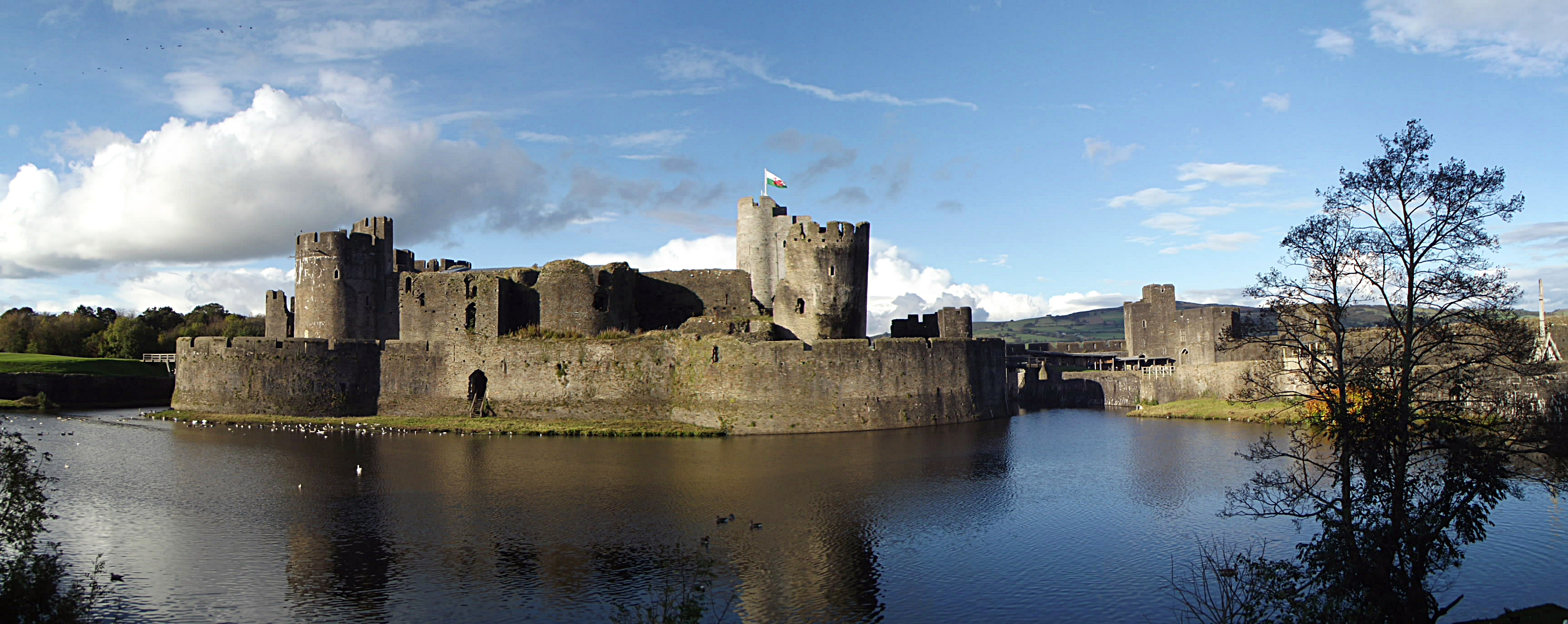
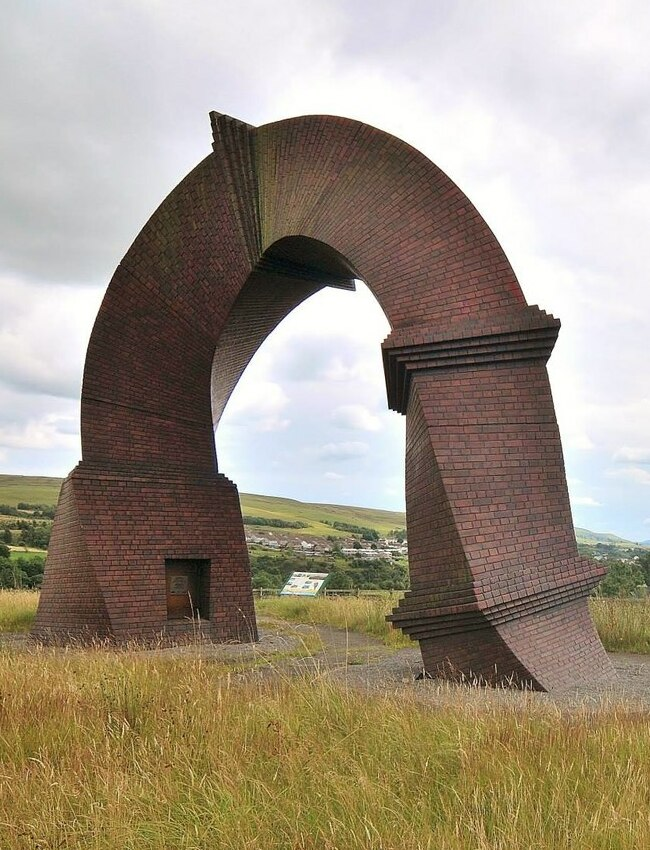
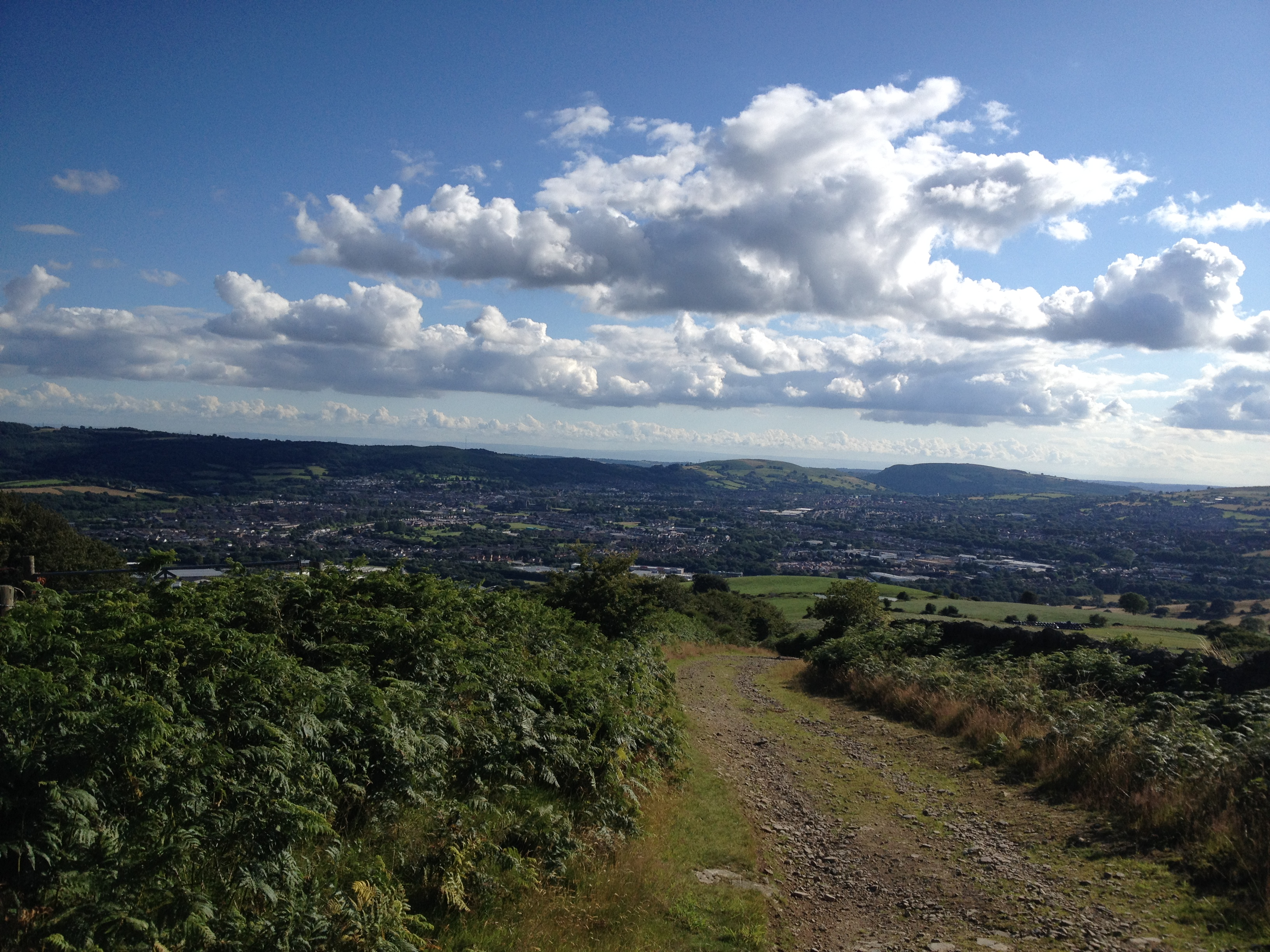
- Left to right: Caerphilly Castle; Twisted Chimney sculpture in Rhymney; Hillside view of Bedwas and Caerphilly

- Coat of arms
- Motto: Working Together for the Good of All
- Caerphilly shown within Wales
- Coordinates: 51.656°N 3.183°W
- Sovereign state: United Kingdom
- Country: Wales
- Preserved county: Gwent
- Incorporated: 1 April 1996
- Administrative HQ: Tredomen Park, Ystrad Mynach

Government
  - Type: Principal council
  - Body: Caerphilly County Borough Council
  - Control: Labour
  - MPs: 3 MPs: Chris Evans (L); Ruth Jones (L); Nick Smith (L)
  - MSs: 12 MSs: 6 in Blaenau Gwent Caerffili Rhymni; 6 in Casnewydd Islwyn

Area
  - Total: 107 sq mi (277 km^{2})
  - Rank: 16th

Population (2024)
  - Total: 176,865
  - Rank: 5th
  - Density: 1,650/sq mi (638/km^{2})

Welsh language (2021)
  - Speakers: 10.5%
  - Rank: 2nd
- Time zone: UTC+0 (GMT)
  - Summer (DST): UTC+1 (BST)
- ISO 3166 code: GB-CAY
- GSS code: W06000018
- Website: caerphilly.gov.uk

Caerphilly County Borough (Welsh: Bwrdeistref Sirol Caerffili) is a county borough in the south-east of Wales. It is governed by Caerphilly County Borough Council.

Its main and largest town is Caerphilly. Other towns in the county borough are Risca, Ystrad Mynach, Newbridge, Blackwood, Bargoed, New Tredegar and Rhymney.

== Geography ==
Caerphilly County Borough is in southeast Wales and straddles the border between the historic counties of Glamorgan and Monmouthshire. It is bordered by Cardiff to the southwest, Newport to the southeast, Torfaen to the east, Blaenau Gwent to the northeast, Powys to the north, Merthyr Tydfil to the northwest and Rhondda Cynon Taf to the west.

The northern part of the borough is formed by the broad expanse of the Rhymney Valley. The Rhymney River rises in the hills in the north and flows southwards for about thirty miles, looping round to the east just to the north of Caerphilly before reaching the Bristol Channel. Some of the larger towns are Bedwas, Risca, Ystrad Mynach, Newbridge, Blackwood, Bargoed, New Tredegar and Rhymney. The valley also includes the communities of Abertysswg, Fochriw, Pontlottyn, Tir-Phil, Brithdir, New Tredegar, Aberbargoed, Rhymney and Ystrad Mynach, and the towns of Bargoed and Caerphilly.

== History ==
Located on the edge of the South Wales Coalfield this area was sparsely populated with livestock husbandry being the main occupation. Farmers in their remote farmhouses on the windswept pastures might dig themselves some bucketfuls of coal for their hearth. Things began to change with the development of the iron industry, the start of the Industrial Revolution. In 1752, a 99-year lease was granted for a parcel of land in the Rhymney Valley which gave the lessees the right to mine coal and iron ore. Other such transactions followed, pit shafts were dug and the coal industry developed. By the beginning of the twentieth century, there were forty coalmines in the valley.

One of the pits sunk in the late nineteenth century was the Elliot Colliery. At its peak before World War I, it was producing over a million tons of coal a year and employing nearly three thousand people. The coal eventually became depleted and the colliery closed in 1967. Most of the site was cleared but the East Winding House survives and is now a Grade II listed building, and a museum of the coal industry in the area has been opened on the site. All the pits in the valley were closed by the end of the twentieth century; the spoil heaps were removed and the area was landscaped so that it is not now apparent that the valley ever had an industrial past.

The county borough was formed on 1 April 1996 by the merger of the Rhymney Valley district of Mid Glamorgan with the Islwyn borough of Gwent. In 2008, as a result of representations from different communities in the borough, a draft plan was put forward proposing various changes to the borders between communities.

== Governance ==
=== Local government ===
Caerphilly County Borough Council is the governing body for the county borough. It has 69 seats and is majority controlled by Labour.

=== UK Parliament ===
Map of the UK Parliament constituencies (numbered) in Caerphilly County Borough (pink), them being Blaenau Gwent and Rhymney (1), Newport West and Islwyn (2), and Caerphilly (3).

Caerphilly County Borough is represented in the House of Commons by three UK Parliament constituencies. These are:

- Caerphilly, represented by Chris Evans (Labour Co-op)
- Newport West and Islwyn, represented by Ruth Jones (Labour)
- Blaenau Gwent and Rhymney, represented by Nick Smith (Labour)

The Caerphilly constituency is the only one wholly within the county borough council's boundaries, whereas Newport West and Islwyn crosses boundaries with Newport, and Blaenau Gwent and Rhymney with Blaenau Gwent.

=== Senedd ===
As of the election in 2026, the Senedd, the county borough is currently represented by two Senedd constituencies:

- Blaenau Gwent Caerffili Rhymni, represented by Delyth Jewell, Lindsay Whittle and Niamh Salkeld of Plaid Cymru, and Llŷr Powell, Catherine Cullen and Joshua Kim of Reform UK.
- Casnewydd Islwyn, represented by Dan Thomas and Art Wright of Reform UK; Peredur Owen Griffiths and Lyn Ackerman of Plaid Cymru; Jayne Bryant of Welsh Labour and Natasha Asghar of the Welsh Conservatives.

Both constituencies cross boundaries with other local authorities. Blaenau Gwent Caerffili Rhymni crosses boundaries with Blaenau Gwent and Casnewydd Islwyn with Newport.

== Freedom of the Borough ==
The following people and military units have received the Freedom of the County Borough of Caerphilly.

=== Individuals ===
- Joseph Calzaghe: 17 May 2009.
- Lauren Price: 6 October 2021.
- Lauren Williams: 6 October 2021.

=== Military Units ===
- The Royal Welsh: 26 September 2010.
- The Royal British Legion: 25 March 2022.

== See also ==
- List of places in Caerphilly County Borough for a list of towns and villages

=== Sports ===
==== Rugby ====
There are many rugby union clubs throughout the county. These are:

- Abercarn RFC
- Aberbargoed RFC
- Abertysswg RFC
- Bargoed RFC
- Bedwas RFC
- Bedwellty RFC
- Blackwood RFC
- Blackwood Stars RFC
- Caerphilly RFC
- Cross Keys RFC
- Crumlin RFC
- Cwmcarn United RFC
- Deri RFC
- Fleur De Lys RFC
- Hafodyrynys RFC
- Machen RFC
- Markham RFC
- Nelson RFC
- Newbridge RFC
- New Tredegar RFC
- Oakdale RFC
- Pontllanfraith RFC
- Penallta RFC
- Risca RFC
- Rhymney RFC
- Senghenydd RFC
- Trinant RFC
