= WRU Division Five East =

Welsh rugby union league

- Founded: 1995
- No. of teams: 11
- Country: Wales
- Most recent champion: Oakdale RFC (2009–10)
- Level on pyramid: 6
- Promotion to: WRU Division Four East, WRU Division Four South East
- Relegation to: WRU Division Six East
- Website: www.wru.co.uk/1158_2116.php

The Welsh Rugby Union Division Five East (also called the SWALEC Division Five East for sponsorship reasons) is a rugby union league in Wales.

== Competition format and sponsorship ==
=== Competition ===
There are 11 clubs in the WRU Division Five East. During the course of a season (which lasts from September to May) each club plays the others twice, once at their home ground and once at that of their opponents for a total of 20 games for each club, with a total of 110 games in each season. Teams receive four points for a win and two point for a draw, an additional bonus point is awarded to either team if they score four tries or more in a single match. No points are awarded for a loss though the losing team can gain a bonus point for finishing the match within seven points of the winning team. Teams are ranked by total points, then the number of tries scored and then points difference. At the end of each season, the club with the most points is crowned as champion. If points are equal the tries scored then points difference determines the winner. The team who is declared champion at the end of the season is eligible for promotion to either the WRU Division Four East or the WRU Division Four South East based on geographical location. The two lowest placed teams are relegated into the WRU Division Six East.

=== Sponsorship ===
In 2008 the Welsh Rugby Union announced a new sponsorship deal for the club rugby leagues with SWALEC valued at £1 million (GBP). The initial three year sponsorship was extended at the end of the 2010/11 season, making SWALEC the league sponsors until 2015. The leagues sponsored are the WRU Divisions one through to seven.

- (2002-2005) Lloyds TSB
- (2005-2008) Asda
- (2008-2015) SWALEC

== 2010/2011 Season ==
=== League Teams ===
- Bettws RFC
- Blackwood Stars RFC
- Brynithel RFC
- Caldicot RFC
- Hartridge RFC
- Llanhilleth RFC
- Pontllanfraith RFC
- Monmouth RFC
- RTB (Ebbw Vale) RFC
- Trinant RFC
- Usk RFC
- Ynysddu RFC

== 2009/2010 Season ==
=== League Teams ===
- Bettws RFC
- Blaenavon RFC
- Brynithel RFC
- Caldicot RFC
- Hartridge RFC
- Llanhilleth RFC
- Oakdale RFC
- Pontllanfraith RFC
- RTB (Ebbw Vale) RFC
- Trinant RFC
- Usk RFC
- Ynysddu RFC

=== 2009/10 table ===
2009-2010 WRU Division Five East League Table
Club	Played	Won	Drawn	Lost	Points for	Points against	Tries for	Tries against	Try bonus	Losing bonus	Points
Oakdale RFC	22	20	2	0	614	226	88	23	13	0	97
Blaenavon RFC	22	16	1	5	444	271	61	33	5	2	73
Brynithel RFC	22	15	3	4	398	292	41	24	4	1	71
Caldicot RFC	22	14	0	8	500	330	69	44	8	3	67
Usk RFC	22	12	2	8	484	431	71	58	11	1	64
Hartridge RFC	22	10	1	11	424	345	52	45	5	5	52
Bettws RFC	22	8	3	11	476	438	59	53	6	7	51
RTB (Ebbw Vale) RFC	22	7	3	12	317	371	38	50	5	4	43
Ynysddu RFC	22	7	1	14	315	376	35	44	3	9	42
Llanhilleth RFC	22	6	3	13	357	475	42	61	3	4	37
Trinant RFC	22	6	1	15	261	487	29	65	1	4	31
Pontllanfraith RFC	22	1	0	21	160	708	17	102	2	1	7
Correct as of 00:00 4 August 2010											

== 2008/2009 Season ==
=== League Teams ===
- Abercarn RFC
- Bettws RFC
- Blaenavon RFC
- Caldicot RFC
- Llanhilleth RFC
- Oakdale RFC
- RTB (Ebbw Vale) RFC
- Talywain RFC
- Trinant RFC
- Usk RFC
- Ynysddu RFC

=== League table ===
2008-2009 WRU Division Five East League Table
Club	Played	Won	Drawn	Lost	Points for	Points against	Tries for	Tries against	Try bonus	Losing bonus	Points
Abercarn RFC	20	17	0	3	582	251	84	29	14	1	83
Talywain RFC	20	15	0	5	433	211	55	24	6	4	70
Caldicot RFC	20	14	1	5	568	379	79	54	11	0	69
Blaenavon RFC	20	14	1	5	381	293	54	38	6	2	66
Trinant RFC	20	13	0	7	378	284	46	38	4	3	59
Usk RFC	20	10	0	10	417	382	56	47	4	5	49
Oakdale RFC	20	10	0	10	353	458	40	60	4	3	47
Llanhilleth RFC	20	8	0	12	286	396	38	51	2	2	36
Ynysddu RFC	20	4	0	16	216	428	27	54	1	5	22
RTB (Ebbw Vale) RFC	20	2	1	17	238	497	35	69	1	5	16
Bettws RFC	20	1	1	18	319	592	39	89	2	4	12
Correct as of 00:00 28 June 2009											

== 2007/2008 Season ==
=== League Teams ===
- Bettws RFC
- Blaenavon RFC
- Caldicot RFC
- Chepstow RFC
- Crumlin RFC
- Llanhilleth RFC
- Oakdale RFC
- RTB (Ebbw Vale) RFC
- Trinant RFC
- Usk RFC
- Ynysddu RFC

=== League table ===
2007-2008 WRU Division Five East League Table
Club	Played	Won	Drawn	Lost	Points for	Points against	Tries for	Tries against	Try bonus	Losing bonus	Points
Crumlin RFC	20	15	0	5	593	206	86	24	10	3	73
Chepstow RFC	20	15	1	4	504	171	80	21	8	2	72
Caldicot RFC	20	14	1	5	414	216	63	27	8	2	68
Blaenavon RFC	20	14	0	6	417	217	54	26	4	3	63
Trinant RFC	20	14	0	6	394	219	47	29	3	3	62
Bettws RFC	20	13	0	7	370	285	48	34	6	3	61
Usk RFC	20	9	0	11	401	363	61	51	7	3	46
Llanhilleth RFC	20	6	1	13	257	411	32	61	1	5	32
Ynysddu RFC	19	4	0	15	179	396	24	56	3	4	23
RTB (Ebbw Vale) RFC	20	1	2	17	82	671	10	104	0	1	9
Oakdale RFC	19	1	1	17	105	561	11	84	0	2	8
Correct as of 00:00 11 June 2008											

== 2006/2007 Season ==
=== League Teams ===
- Abertillery/Blaenau Gwent RFC - Champions (Promoted)
- Bettws RFC
- Blaenavon RFC
- Caldicot RFC
- Chepstow RFC
- Gwernyfed RFC - 2nd (Promoted)
- Llanhilleth RFC
- Oakdale RFC
- RTB (Ebbw Vale) RFC
- Usk RFC
- Ynysddu RFC
