= BRFC =

BRFC may refer to:

== Angling ==
- British Record (Rod Caught) Fish Committee

== Association football ==
Professional clubs:

- Berwick Rangers F.C.
- Blackburn Rovers F.C.
- Brisbane Roar FC
- Bristol Rovers F.C.

Other clubs:

- Ballymacash Rangers F.C.
- Ballywalter Recreation F.C.
- Banbridge Rangers F.C.
- Barton Rovers F.C.
- Bridon Ropes F.C.
- Brightlingsea Regent F.C.
- Brimsdown Rovers F.C.
- Bromsgrove Rovers F.C.
- Brora Rangers F.C.
- Burnham Ramblers F.C.

== Rugby union ==
In Wales:

- Baglan RFC
- Bala RFC
- Bangor RFC
- Banwen RFC
- Bargoed RFC
- Barry RFC
- Beddau RFC
- Bedlinog RFC
- Bedwas RFC
- Bethesda RFC
- Bettws RFC
- Betws RFC
- Birchgrove RFC
- Blackwood RFC
- Blaenavon RFC
- Blaina RFC
- Bonymaen RFC
- Brecon RFC
- Bryncethin RFC
- Bryncoch RFC
- Brynithel RFC
- Brynmawr RFC

In England:

- Barking Rugby Football Club
- Barnes Rugby Football Club
- Barnstaple RFC
- Basingstoke R.F.C.
- Beckenham Rugby Football Club
- Berwick RFC
- Billericay Rugby Football Club
- Birstall RFC
- Blaydon RFC
- Boston RFC (England)
- Bournville RFC
- Bracknell RFC
- Bromsgrove RFC
- Burton RFC

In Ireland:

- Balbriggan RFC
- Ballincollig RFC
- Ballymena R.F.C.
- Ballynahinch RFC
- Banbridge RFC
- Barnhall RFC
- Birr RFC
- Boyne RFC
- Bruff R.F.C.

In Scotland:

- Bannockburn RFC
- Berwick RFC
- Biggar RFC
- Boroughmuir RFC

Others:

- Bangalore rugby football club
- Boston RFC (United States)
