= Ken Braddock =

- Full name: Kenneth James Braddock
- Born: 28 August 1938 Treowen, Newbridge, Wales
- Died: 20 August 2018 (aged 79) Stafford, England

Rugby union career
- Position: Flanker
International career
| Years | Team | Apps | (Points) |
| 1966–67 | Wales | 3 | (0) |

Kenneth James Braddock (28 August 1938 — 20 August 2018) was a Welsh international rugby union player.

Born in Treowen, Newbridge, Braddock attended Greenfield Secondary Modern School and played his earliest rugby with Trinant, before joining Newbridge RFC. He earned representative honours in 1964 with a Combined Abertillery-Newbridge side that earned a draw against Fiji. Capped three times by Wales, Braddock made his debut against the Wallabies in 1966, forming a back row with Alun Pask and Haydn Morgan. He made two Five Nations Championship appearances the following year, against Scotland and Ireland, then found himself replaced by Ron Jones.

Braddock, who started his working life as a coal miner, had many years with the Staffordshire Police force, after relocating to England during the late 1960s. He was heavily involved in police rugby.

== See also ==
- List of Wales national rugby union players
