= Derek Williams (sportsman) =

Welsh cricketer and rugby union player

- Born: Charles Derek Williams; 24 November 1924 Cardiff, Wales
- Died: 19 September 2014 (aged 89)

Rugby union career
- Position: Flanker
International career
Years	Team	Apps	(Points)
1955–1956	Wales	2	(3)

Charles Derek "CD" Williams (24 November 1924 – 19 September 2014) was a Welsh sportsman who played international rugby union for Wales. He also played first-class cricket for the Oxford University Cricket Club.

As a cricketer, Williams was a Glamorgan Colts player in 1945 and played with the Glamorgan Second XI until 1953, but was unable to break into their County Championship team. His only first-class appearance was for Oxford University, against Gloucestershire, in 1946. Coming in at six in the batting order, Williams scored just 3 and 0 in his two innings. He also played Minor Counties cricket for Berkshire, in 1949 and 1950.

Williams, a forward, wasn't capped for the Wales national rugby union team until he was 30, making his debut in 1955, against France at Colombes. In his second Test the following year, Williams scored the try which secured the 1956 Five Nations Championship for Wales, in a 5–3 win over France in Cardiff. His try was controversial as he had come very close to the dead-ball line and television replays also showed that teammate Geoff Whitson had knocked on earlier in the passage. He played most of his club rugby for the Cardiff RFC, which he captained, making a total of 248 appearances. Derek Williams died on 19 September 2014 at the age of 89.
