= Haydn Morgan =

Welsh rugby union player (1936–2018)

- Born: Haydn Joseph Morgan; 30 July 1936 Oakdale, Wales
- Died: 20 July 2018 (aged 81)
- Height: 5 ft 10 in (178 cm)
- Weight: 13 st 7 lb (189 lb; 86 kg)
- School: Newbridge Grammar School
- Occupation: paratrooper

Rugby union career
- Position: Flanker
Amateur team(s)
Years	Team	Apps	(Points)
- Oakdale RFC
–	Trinant RFC		
–	Abertillery RFC		
–	Army XV		
–	Bicester RUFC		
–	Barbarian F.C.		
International career
Years	Team	Apps	(Points)
1958–1966	Wales	27	(9)
1959–1962	British Lions	4	(0)

Haydn Morgan (30 July 1936 – 20 July 2018) was a Welsh international flanker who played club rugby for Abertillery and Bicester Rugby Union Football Club. He was awarded twenty-seven caps for Wales and toured with Ronnie Dawson's 1959 and Arthur Smith's 1962 British Lions squads. Although a reliable and dynamic player with a heavy, but clean tackle, Morgan suffered at the hands of the selectors often dropped for players who never showed any international longevity.

Morgan first played with Abertillery at the age of 18 at centre, but when called up for National Service he switched to wing-forward while playing for the army.

While garrisoned at MOD Bicester, he asked if he could run out for Bicester Rugby Union Football Club and, with tough selection in those days, was selected to play for the 2nd XV. He wore skipper Ken Haddock's shirt and went on to score two tries. He continued to play for Bicester and played for both club and country (Wales) on successive Saturdays in 1958. Within two years of first wearing a Bicester jersey, he was also called up for duty with the British Lions in 1959 and then again in 1962.

On his return from the army he once again joined the ranks of Abertillery and came to prominence during the joint Abertillery/Ebbw Vale team that faced the touring Australians.

== International matches played ==
Wales

- England 1958, 1960, 1961, 1962, 1965, 1966
- France 1958, 1959, 1961, 1962, 1963, 1965, 1966
- Ireland 1958, 1959, 1961, 1962, 1963, 1965, 1966
- Scotland 1958, 1961, 1962, 1963, 1965, 1966
- Australia 1966

== Bibliography ==
- Smith, David; Williams, Gareth (1980). Fields of Praise: The Official History of The Welsh Rugby Union. Cardiff: University of Wales Press. ISBN 0-7083-0766-3.
- Thomas, Wayne (1979). A Century of Welsh Rugby Players. Ansells Ltd.
