= Thornewill and Warham =

English engineering company (1740–1929)

Thornewill and Warham Ltd was a metal hardware and industrial metalwork manufacturer, later an engineering company, based in Burton upon Trent, Staffordshire, England. Under different names it traded from 1740 until 1929, becoming a notable producer of steam engines and railway locomotives. It also constructed two footbridges across the River Trent in Burton.

== History ==
=== Thornewill hardware manufacture ===
The Thornewill family were in the 'iron' business from at least 1732, when Thomas Thornewill (born 1691) was described as an 'Iron Merchant', and his son Francis at his marriage in 1767 was a "yeoman and edged-tool maker of Stretton". By 1740, Thomas and his brother Francis had established a business on the south side of New Street, making spades and other edged tools.

The Earl of Uxbridge owned Clay Mill, which had been abandoned as a corn mill around 1730. In 1753 William Wyatt, the Earl of Uxbridge's steward, wrote that there was "nothing of any value remaining except the building and those in a very shattered and ruinous condition. I had a person with me to take the place in the conditions it is now in for a blade mill, that is, a mill for grinding all sorts of large edged tools and iron plates and for the plating of iron". In 1755 Thomas Thornewill took the lease of Clay Mill at an annual rent of 10 guineas. Thornewill spent over £300 on repairs to the building and its conversion into "a plating Forge for hammering and plating of iron into thin plates". The Clay Mills site was bought by Thornewills in 1786 for £3,220.

In 1792 there is reference to "Mr. Thornewill, ironmonger, of Clay Mills, Stretton". By 1829 brothers John & Francis Thornewill, Iron Merchants and Iron and Brass Founders were established in New Street.

John Thornewill died in 1836, and his brother Francis died unmarried in 1846, leaving the business in the hands of John's son Robert (born 22 January 1799).

=== Thornewill and Warham ===
In 1849, Robert (aged 50) entered into a partnership with 29-year-old John Robson Warham (born 20 November 1820), an engineer from South Shields who joined the Thornewill company in about 1842, and the firm became Thornewill and Warham. Robert died on 16 July 1858, aged 59, and his share of the business (and the running of it) was taken over by his 52-year-old widow, Martha Hammond Thornewill, née Wright, from Eyam in Derbyshire.

=== Steam engineering ===
Until about 1845, the business was mainly a hardware firm making iron, copper and brass goods mainly used in the Burton breweries, but from 1845 onwards it became an engineering firm described as "iron and brass founders and steam engine makers", manufacturing engines for local collieries and breweries.

By 1851 Thornewill & Warham was described as "Iron Merchants and Steam Engine, Machinery, etc. Manufacturers," and employed 75 men and 25 boys. By 1861, they had 178 employees, mainly engaged in making colliery winding engines, and locomotives, providing the Burton breweries with most of their locomotives between 1860 and 1880; most of Bass & Co's 11 locomotives were supplied by the company.

In 1868, a new partnership was formed, in which Martha Thornewill, now aged 62, held half the shares, her son Robert (now aged 25) five twelfths, and John Robsom Warham the remaining twelfth. Warham died of bronchitis on 26 March 1886 aged 66 (and was buried in Stapenhill Cemetery); Martha died in 1889 aged 83, and her half-share in the business passed to her three sons, the other two of whom Robert bought out to become sole owner by 1893.

By 1870 Thornewill and Warham was supplying steam engines to Scotland, London and South Wales, and after 1890 were exporting winding, pumping and hauling engines all over the world - to collieries, cotton mills, gold and diamond mines and waterworks in China, Japan, Borneo, India, South Africa, South America and Australia, at least 329 in all.

=== Construction engineering ===
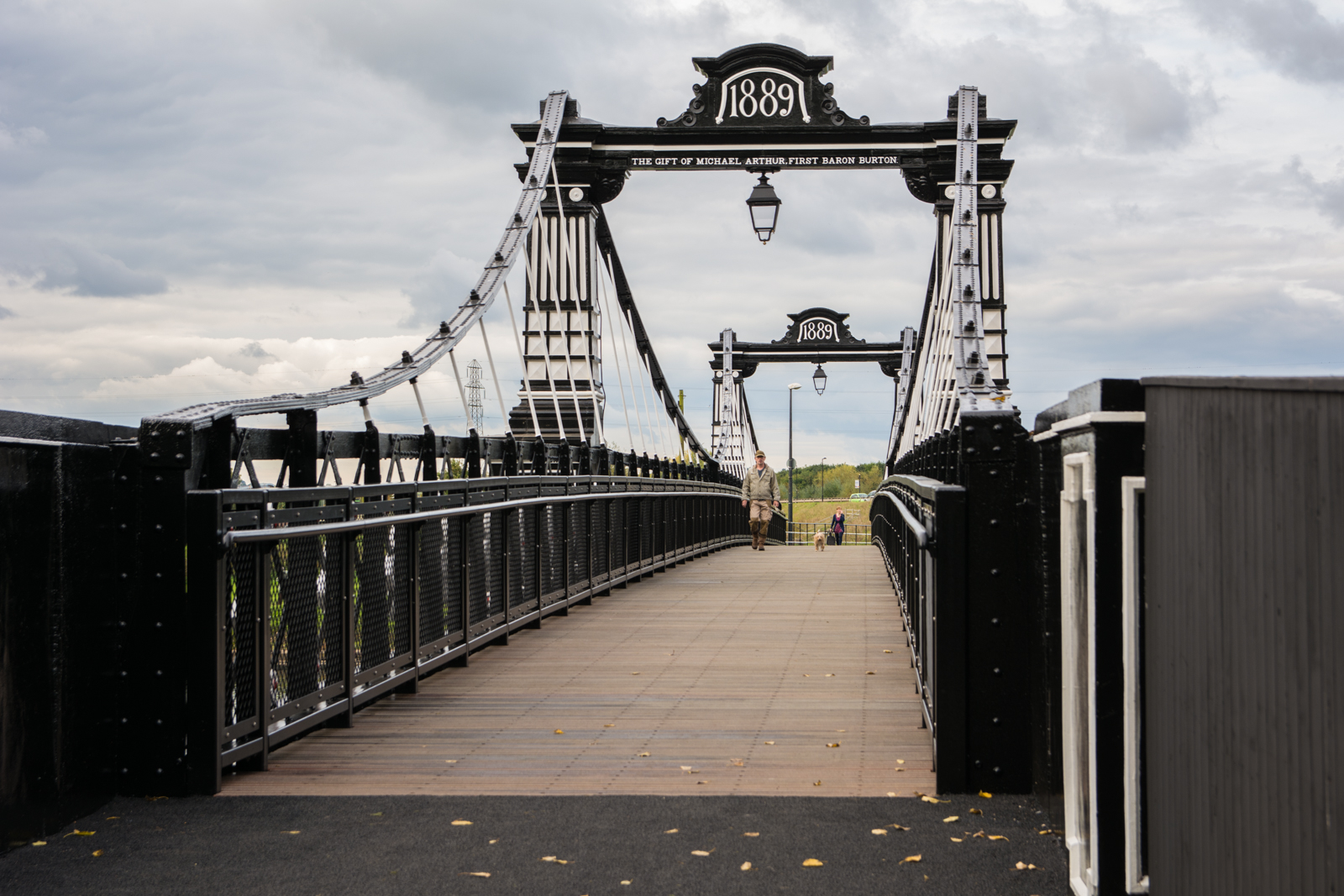
Ferry bridge, after restoration in 2016

Apart from the manufacture of steam engines, the company was also notable for its construction engineering: it provided and installed much of the ironwork in the Burton breweries between 1850 and 1890.

In 1883 and 1884, the company built an iron bridge to replace a wooden footbridge connecting Burton to Andresy island. This led to the company's appointment to build a further bridge in the town. The construction in 1889 of Burton's Ferry Bridge and the connecting viaduct to Bond End, at a total cost of just over £10,000, was one of the firm's major achievements in that field, the bridge being designed by Edward William Ives (1851-1914?), with assistance from Alfred Andrew Langley, chief engineer of the Midland Railway.

Robert Thornewill, sole owner, died on 22 November 1914 aged 71; his only son, Robert Surtees Thornewill, was a clergyman in London's East End with no interest in engineering. Eventually, in 1919 Thornewill and Warham Ltd went into liquidation and a new company of the same name was formed. This was taken over in 1929 by a rival, S. Briggs & Co. Ltd. of Burton (today Briggs of Burton PLC), a manufacturer of brewing, distilling and pharmaceutical equipment.

== Legacy ==
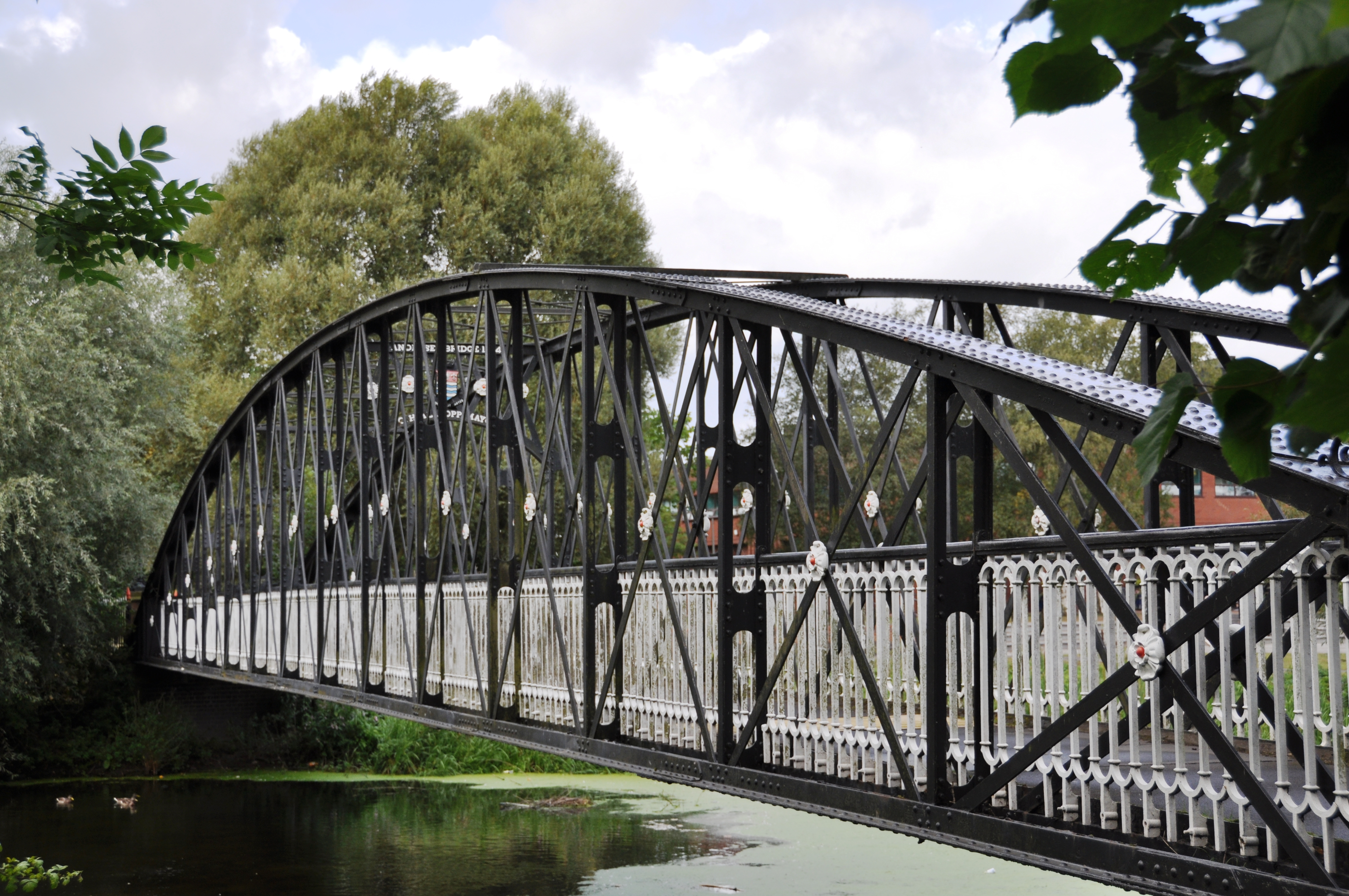
Andresey bridge

Burton's Ferry Bridge remains in service across the River Trent, having twice been renovated (in the 1970s and in 2015-2016), as does the nearby Andresey Bridge.

Examples of Thornewill and Warham steam engines can be found in various museums and preserved buildings, including:

- Yorkshire's Markham Grange Steam Museum (an engine built in 1884 for Greenall Whitley's brewery at Wilderspool in Warrington)
- the former Elliot Colliery in New Tredegar, south Wales (a steam winding engine built in 1891).
- Bratch pumping station, Bilston (engines dated 1897)
