= Cecil Pritchard =

Wales international rugby union footballer

- Born: Cecil Clifford Pritchard; 1 May 1902 Pontypool, Torfaen, Wales
- Died: 27 August 1966 (aged 64) Newport, Wales

Rugby union career
- Position: Hooker
Amateur team(s)
| Years | Team | Apps | (Points) |
- Blaenavon RFC
| – | Talywain RFC | | |
| – | Cross Keys RFC | | |
| – | Pontypool RFC | | |
| – | Barnstaple RFC | | |
| – | Monmouthshire | | |
International career
| Years | Team | Apps | (Points) |
| 1928-1929 | Wales | 8 | (0) |

Cecil Clifford Pritchard (1 May 1902 - 27 August 1966) was an international rugby union hooker who represented Wales on eight occasions and was best associated at club level with Pontypool RFC.

== Personal history ==
Pritchard was born in the Tranch are of Pontypool, Wales in 1902. He was the second of three brothers who would all go on to have rugby careers. Pritchard work as a collier before later working for the local council. He died in Newport, Wales in 1966.

== Rugby career ==
Pritchard first played rugby for local team, Tranch Rovers, same as his elder brother George 'Cogley' and younger brother Royce. George played local rugby for Blaenavon RFC before moving to the south west of England where he played for Barnstaple RFC and Torquay Athletic RFC.

=== International matches played ===
Wales

- England 1928, 1929
- France 1928, 1929
- Ireland 1928, 1929
- Scotland 1928, 1929

== Bibliography ==
- Davies, D.E. (1975). Cardiff Rugby Club, History and Statistics 1876-1975. Risca: The Starling Press. ISBN 0950442100.
- Smith, David; Williams, Gareth (1980). Fields of Praise: The Official History of The Welsh Rugby Union. Cardiff: University of Wales Press. ISBN 0-7083-0766-3.
