= Mel Rosser =

GB & Wales dual-code rugby footballer

- Born: Melville Aaron Rosser; 18 April 1901 Machen, Caerphilly County Borough, Wales
- Died: 8 September 1988 (aged 87) York, England
- Occupation(s): police officer publican

Rugby union career
- Position(s): Full-back, Centre
Amateur team(s)
Years	Team	Apps	(Points)
- Machen RFC
1922–23	Cardiff RFC		
1924	Penarth RFC		
- Glamorgan Police RFC
- Glamorgan County RFC
International career
Years	Team	Apps	(Points)
1924	Wales	2	(0)
- Rugby league career

Playing information
- Position: Backs
Club
Years	Team	Pld	T	G	FG	P
1924–31	Leeds	225				249
1931	York
	Total	225	0	0	0	249
Representative
Years	Team	Pld	T	G	FG	P
1926–33	Wales	5				12
1928	Great Britain	0				0

Melville "Mel" Aaron Rosser sometimes recorded as Melvin and Melvyn (18 April 1901 – 8 September 1988) was a Welsh international rugby centre who played rugby union for Penarth and Cardiff and later turned to professional rugby league joining first Leeds, and then York. Rosser played international rugby for Wales under both union and league codes, and toured Australia with the Great Britain rugby league team in 1928.

== Rugby union career ==
Mel Rosser began his rugby career with his local rugby club Machen RFC, before moving to first class team Cardiff. He played two seasons for Cardiff, scoring four tries during his period with the club. During the 1923–24 season, Rosser switched from Cardiff to local rival club Penarth. It was as a Penarth player that he was first selected for international duty, selected for Wales to face Scotland as part of the 1924 Five Nations Championship. Rosser was brought in at centre, partnered with Jack Elwyn Evans of Llanelli. The game was a sporting disaster, with Scotland inflicting their heaviest victory over Wales, and running up a record breaking score in a 35–10 win.

Although Rosser was dropped after the Scotland game, missing the encounter with Ireland, he was reselected for the final game of the Championship, away to France. Rosser was originally intended to play at centre, but on the train trip to Paris the Welsh selectors suspended Ossie Male as he had broken a rule preventing any player from representing Wales if they had played club rugby within the week leading up to the international match. With no other fullback aboard the train, Rosser was switched to an emergency fullback with reserve player Joe Jones drafted into the backs. It was a narrow win for Wales, with the victory coming thanks to a Vince Griffiths dropped goal.

During his rugby union career, Griffiths also represented Glamorgan County and as a serving police officer, he also played for Glamorgan Police.

=== International rugby union matches played ===
Wales

- France 1924
- Scotland 1924

== Rugby league career ==
At the start of the 1924/1925 season, Rosser turned his back on rugby union by joining professional rugby league club Leeds. At the same time he left the police force and became a licensee. He played his first game for Leeds on 6 September 1924, and on 12 April 1926 he was selected to play for the Wales national rugby league team, making him a dual-code international. The game was held at Pontypridd against England, and the Welsh lost narrowly despite scoring six tries and two goals. Rosser scoring one of the tries. He had to wait almost four years to record his second and Wales league cap, when he was selected to face Australia at Wembley in early 1930. Although Wales lost again, Rosser was again on the score sheet with another try. In between his two Wales caps for Leeds, Rosser also represented Great Britain on the team's 1928 tour of Australia. One of six Welsh players who went on the tour, he played in nine matches though none of the six Tests.

In January 1931, Rosser switched rugby clubs from Leeds to York Football Club. While at York he represented Wales another three times, two games against England and another encounter with Australia. The Australian game was his last, played on 30 December 1930.

Mel Rosser played left-centre in Monmouthshire's 14-18 defeat by Glamorgan in the non-County Championship match during the 1926–27 season at Taff Vale Park, Pontypridd on Saturday 30 April 1927.

Mel Rosser played right-centre in York's 8-22 defeat by Halifax in the 1930–31 Challenge Cup Final during the 1930–31 season at Wembley Stadium, London on Saturday 2 May 1931, in front of a crowd of 40,368.

=== International rugby league matches played ===
Wales

- England 1926, 1931, 1932
- Australia 1930, 1933

== Bibliography ==
- Gate, Robert (1986). Gone North: Volume 1. Ripponden: R.E. Gate. ISBN 0-9511190-0-1.
- Godwin, Terry (1984). The International Rugby Championship 1883–1983. London: Willows Books. ISBN 0-00-218060-X.
- Jenkins, John M.; et al. (1991). Who's Who of Welsh International Rugby Players. Wrexham: Bridge Books. ISBN 1-872424-10-4.
- Smith, David; Williams, Gareth (1980). Fields of Praise: The Official History of The Welsh Rugby Union. Cardiff: University of Wales Press. ISBN 0-7083-0766-3.
