= Brian Cresswell =

Welsh rugby union player

- Full name: Brian Robert Cresswell
- Born: 9 November 1934 Newport, Wales
- Died: 6 December 2020 (aged 86)
- School: St Julian's High School

Rugby union career
- Position: Flanker
Senior career
Years	Team	Apps	(Points)
1956–63	Newport	236	(117)
International career
Years	Team	Apps	(Points)
1960	Wales	4	(6)

Brian Robert Cresswell (9 November 1934 — 6 December 2020) was a Welsh international rugby union player.

Cresswell was born in Newport and educated at St Julian's High School.

A blindside flanker, Cresswell played in the Newport team that defeated the touring Wallabies in 1957.

Cresswell won four Wales caps in the 1960 Five Nations Championship, forming a back-row in two of the matches with Newport teammates Glyn Davidge and Geoff Whitson. He scored a try in Wales's 10–9 win over Ireland at Lansdowne Road and another in their loss to France in Paris.

In 2015, Cresswell was inducted into the Newport RFC Hall of Fame.

== See also ==
- List of Wales national rugby union players
