= Bettws, Newport =

Bettws: Welsh: Betws
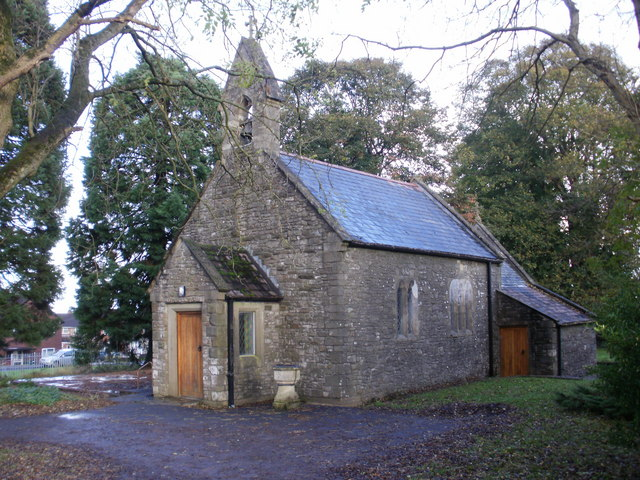
- Parish church of St David

- Location within Newport
- Population: 7,978 (2019 census)
- OS grid reference: ST289905
- Principal area: Newport
- Preserved county: Gwent
- Country: Wales
- Sovereign state: United Kingdom
- Post town: NEWPORT
- Postcode district: NP20
- Dialling code: 01633
- Police: Gwent
- Fire: South Wales
- Ambulance: Welsh
- UK Parliament: Newport East
- Senedd Cymru – Welsh Parliament: Newport West
- List of places UK Wales Newport 51.609°N 03.028°W Map of the community

Bettws (Welsh: Betws) is a large modern housing estate, electoral ward and coterminous community (parish) of the city of Newport, South Wales.

== Etymology ==
The name of the village comes from the Middle English word bedhus, meaning "prayer house", which became betws in Welsh.

== Infrastructure ==
The housing estate was built in the 1960s, and the large majority of houses are identical in plan and design. The roads in the estate are all named after rivers. 51.8% of housing is privately owned, and 42.6% is rented from either Newport City Council or local housing associations, such as Charter Housing. In 2009 Newport City Council transferred ownership of its social housing and most of the land it owned in the area to Newport City Homes, a housing association.

The estate was built around the 17th-century parish church of St David in Bettws, which is the likely origin of the name 'Bettws', a place of prayer or private chapel. St David's is a grade two listed building and is currently in need of a £40,000 renovation. John Frost, who led Chartist protests in Newport for universal suffrage in the 1830s (the Newport Rising), is alleged to have married Mary Geach at the church.

The ward is bounded by Malpas to the east, the city boundary with Torfaen to the north, Rogerstone to the west, and the M4 motorway and Allt-yr-yn to the south.

== Sport and Leisure ==
In recent years it has benefited greatly from the introduction of sporting facilities such as new football pitches. Bettws RFC is a rugby union team playing in the WRU Division Five East. Sifil A.F.C. is a football team located in Bettws playing in the Gwent County Football League, Division 1. Malpas Cricket Club is also situated on Bettws Lane in Bettws.

== Elections ==
In the 2012 Police and Crime Commissioner election, held on 15 November 2012, a polling station at Malpas Cricket Club recorded no votes from the 8,737 voters.

Bettws is an electoral ward to Newport City Council.

== See also ==
- Newport High School
