= Mike Watkins (rugby union) =

Welsh rugby union footballer (1952–2025)

- Born: Michael John Watkins; 9 January 1952 Abercarn, Wales
- Died: 25 November 2025 (aged 73) Thailand
- Height: 5 ft 9 in (175 cm)
- Weight: 13 st 3 lb (185 lb; 84 kg)
- School: Cwmcarn School

Rugby union career
- Position: Hooker
Amateur team(s)
Years	Team	Apps	(Points)
1973–1975	Crumlin RFC		
1975–1981	Cardiff RFC		
1981–1987	Newport RFC		
- Barbarian F.C.
- Crawshays RFC
- Monmouthshire
International career
Years	Team	Apps	(Points)
1984	Wales	4	(0)

Michael John Watkins (9 January 1952 – 25 November 2025) was a Welsh rugby union player who won four caps for Wales as a hooker. He played club rugby for Cardiff and Newport and county rugby for Monmouthshire.

== Rugby career ==
Watkins played rugby from a young age and represented several youth and school teams from the Newport area, including Cwmcarn Youth, Gwent Schools and South Monmouthshire Schools. After spending two seasons with Crumlin, Watkins moved to first class team Cardiff. Two years after joining Cardiff, Watkins gained his first Welsh trial in 1977. In 1978, Watkins was selected for the Welsh tour of Australia, though he was not chosen for either of the two tests. Watkins was selected for the Wales B team several times during the 1970s but did not gain his first full cap until 1984 when he had switched club to Newport.

Watkins gained his first international cap in a match against Ireland as part of the 1984 Five Nations Championship. Watkins not only represented his country but was also given the captaincy, making him only the fourth Welsh player to be given the captain's role on his debut. The Welsh and Watkins were victorious, beating the Irish 18-9 at Lansdowne Road. Watkins played a further three games for Wales, all as captain. His final game was against the touring Australian team in 1984 at the Cardiff Arms Park. Watkins resigned from international rugby in 1984, along with past Welsh captains, Eddie Butler and Gareth Davies. Watkins lived in Bangkok and released an autobiography entitled 'Spikey, 2 Hard to Handle'.

== Death ==
Watkins's death at the age of 73 was announced on 25 November 2025.

== Bibliography ==
- Griffiths, John (1987). The Phoenix Book of International Rugby Records. London: Phoenix House. ISBN 0-460-07003-7.
- Watkins, Mike (2014). Spikey: 2 hard to handle. Cardiff: St. David's Press. ISBN 9781902719405.
