= Fenton Coles =

Wales international rugby union footballer

- Born: Fenton George Coles; 14 September 1937 (age 89) Blaenavon, Wales
- Height: 1.78 m (5 ft 10 in)
- Weight: 77 kg (12 st 2 lb)
- School: Blaenavon Secondary

Rugby union career
- Position: wing
Amateur team(s)
Years	Team	Apps	(Points)
- Blaenavon RFC
–	Pontypool RFC		
–	Monmouthshire County RFC		
International career
Years	Team	Apps	(Points)
1960	Wales	3	(0)

Fenton George Coles (born 14 September 1937) was a Welsh rugby union player. A wing, Coles played club rugby initially for his home town club of Blaenavon before switching to Pontypool RFC. In 1960 he was part of a joint Cross Keys/Pontypool team to face a touring South Africa team and that year saw Coles selected for Wales playing three games in the 1960 Five Nations Championship. During the 1964–65 season he was made captain of the Pontypool first team.
