= Llanhilleth RFC =

Welsh rugby union club, based in Llanhilleth, Blaenau Gwent

(Wales) Llanhilleth RFC
- Full name: Llanhilleth Rugby Football Club
- Founded: 1894; 132 years ago
- Location: Llanhilleth, Wales
- Chairman: Gareth Collier
- President: Dave Witcombe
- League: WRU Division Five East
- 2009-10: 10th
Team kit

Official website
- www.llanhillethrugbyclub.co.uk

Llanhilleth Rugby Football Club is a rugby union team from the village of Llanhilleth in Blaenau Gwent, Wales. The club is a member of the Welsh Rugby Union and is a feeder club for the Dragons.

== Early history ==
Although rugby was known to have been played in Llanhilleth before the 1890s it is generally accepted that the team that would become Llanhilleth RFC first played club rugby in 1894. This team was called the Grasshoppers and was formed by members of the local male voice choir. After the First World War the club played under the name 'The All Blacks' and achieved some local success including winning the Cyrus Davies Cup on two occasions. Like most Welsh clubs, Llanhilleth disbanded during the Second World War but reformed under its present name on 4 April 1946, and that season won the Cyrus Davies Cup for a third time.

== Club colours ==
The club presently play in light blue and dark Blue, a strip that was chosen by accident after World War II. With rationing still in force the club asked residents to donate clothing rations to buy a new kit for the team. With enough rations collected team residents travelled to Cardiff to buy a new strip, but when they arrived at the Welsh Sports shop in the capital there was only one full rugby jersey kit available, a Cardiff RFC kit that had not been collected. The kit was bought and similar to Llanharan RFC the team now wear Black and Blue, the colours of Cardiff.

== Club honours ==
- 1994-95 Welsh League Division 8B East - Champions
