= David Nash (rugby union) =

British Lions & Wales international rugby union footballer

- Born: David Nash; 15 July 1939 Markham, Wales
- Died: 30 October 2016 (aged 77)
- School: Nantyglo Grammar
- University: Cardiff College of Education

Rugby union career
- Position: No. 8
Amateur team(s)
Years	Team	Apps	(Points)
- Cardiff Athletic
–	Crumlin RFC		
–	Ebbw Vale RFC		
–	Barbarian F.C.		
–	Monmouthshire		
International career
Years	Team	Apps	(Points)
1960–1962	Wales	6	(0)
1962	British Lions	0	(0)

David Nash (15 July 1939 – 30 October 2016) was a Wales international rugby union player. A number 8 forward, he attained 6 caps for Wales between 1960 and 1961. Nash was selected for the 1962 British Lions tour of South Africa. He played his club rugby for Ebbw Vale.

In 1967 Nash was appointed as the first honorary national coach of the Wales national rugby union team. He was appointed to coach Wales for the season, but having won one and drawn one out of the five international matches played, he resigned when the Welsh Rugby Union refused to allow him to accompany Wales on their 1968 tour of Argentina. Eventually, the WRU reversed their decision, appointing Clive Rowlands to tour as coach. He died in 2016, aged 77.
