= Edward Peake =

Wales international rugby union player

- Born: Edward Peake; 20 March 1860 Tidenham, Gloucestershire, England
- Died: 3 January 1945 (aged 84) Huntingdonshire, England
- School: Marlborough College
- University: Oriel College, Oxford

Rugby union career
- Position: Three-quarter
Amateur team(s)
Years	Team	Apps	(Points)
- Oxford University RFC
- Chepstow RFC
1880–1881	Newport RFC		
International career
Years	Team	Apps	(Points)
1881	Wales	1	(0)

Edward Peake (29 March 1860 – 3 January 1945) was a Wales international rugby union three-quarter and county cricketer. Educated at Oriel College, Oxford, Peake would win a Blue for cricket before representing Gloucestershire. Peake is most notable for being a member of the first Wales rugby union team that played England in 1881. In his later life he became a teacher and Anglican minister.

== Personal life ==
He was born in Tidenham, Gloucestershire to Richard Peake of Chepstow and his wife Gertrude Peake. He was educated first at Marlborough College, and matriculated at Oriel College, Oxford in 1880, graduating B.A. in 1883 and M.A. in 1886.

While at Oxford, Peake won Blues in both cricket and athletics and represented the university rugby team. He had a brief career in rugby, curtailed by injury, but was able to have a longer cricketing career, representing Gloucestershire and Berkshire.

Peake was a school teacher by profession and became assistant master at two private schools at Southborne and Clifton before later teaching at Clifton College. From 1885 until 1896 he was assistant master at Giggleswick School in Yorkshire, before gaining his first headship, at Bradford College, a post he held from 1896 to 1909. In 1909 he gained a position as chaplain of Christ Church, Oxford where he was also the headmaster of their Cathedral Choir School. By 1921, Peake had left education and was the rector of Bluntisham in Huntingdonshire, where he died on 3 January 1945.

Edward Peake left money in his will for a school to be built, Edward Peake Middle School on Potton Road, Biggleswade, Bedfordshire.

== Rugby career ==
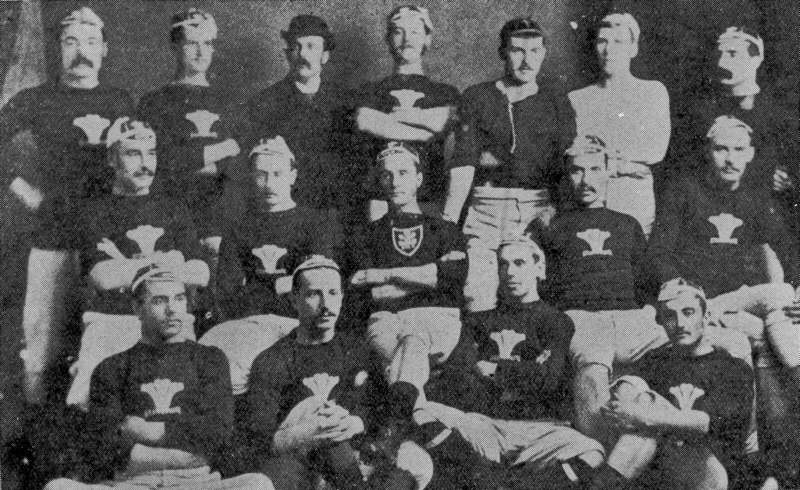
Peake sat in middle row, second from left, with the first Wales international team, 1881.

Peake first played rugby at Marlborough College, before representing Oxford, though he did not win a sporting Blue. Peake later played rugby for Chepstow and while representing the club was chosen by Richard Mullock as one of the Welsh XV to face England in the first Wales rugby international. The first Welsh team was mainly chosen from the geographic distribution of the representative clubs, so Mulloch could appease the different club regions of Wales, and the university pedigree of the players. Peake would have fitted both these categories, and would have been known to Mullock as his Newport team had played Chepstow twice in the 1879–1880 season. Peake played at three-quarters alongside the team captain James Bevan, in a game that quickly turned into a national embarrassment when England scored 13 tries without reply. This first historic game would be Peake's one and only international rugby cap, along with eight other members of the Welsh squad. From that first Welsh squad, Peake was one of three players who later became Anglican clergymen, the others being captain, Bevan and future Wales' captain Charlie Newman.

Peake later played a single game for first-class Welsh team Newport RFC, but his rugby career would be cut short after a hurdling accident at Oxford.

=== International matches played ===
Wales

- England 1881

== Cricket career ==
Peake first played cricket for Marlborough College, where he was a member of the cricket eleven in 1878, captaining the team in 1879. At Oriel College he joined the University cricket team, playing from the 1880 season through to 1883, winning a Sporting Blue. Peake played in 46 first-class cricket matches, 26 of them for Gloucester, and played alongside E. M. and W. G. Grace. He also played minor counties championship cricket with Berkshire. As a first-class cricketer he took 116 wickets as a right-arm fast bowler, and averaged 13.07 runs with the bat in 80 innings.

== Bibliography ==
- Smith, David; Williams, Gareth (1980). Fields of Praise: The Official History of The Welsh Rugby Union. Cardiff: University of Wales Press. ISBN 0-7083-0766-3.
