= Casnewydd Islwyn =

Senedd constituency (from 2026)

- County multi-member constituency for the Senedd
- Boundary of Casnewydd Islwyn in Wales
- Principal areas: Caerphilly County Borough; Newport
- Preserved county: Gwent
- Population: 220,058 (2024)
- Major settlements: Abercarn, Blackwood, Caerleon, Newbridge, Newport, Risca

Current County multi-member constituency
- Created: 2026
- Seats: 6
- Created from: UK Parliament boundaries: Newport East; Newport West and Islwyn; Previous Senedd constituencies: Islwyn; Newport East; Newport West; Previous Senedd region: South Wales East

Casnewydd Islwyn (Welsh for 'Newport [and] Islwyn';) is a six-member constituency of the Senedd (Welsh Parliament; Welsh: Senedd Cymru) used in the 2026 Senedd election. It covers areas in the south-east of Wales, particularly parts of Caerphilly and Newport.

It was proposed following the 2026 review of Senedd constituencies, and is a pairing of the two UK Parliament constituencies of Newport East and Newport West and Islwyn. It has a Welsh-only name.

== Boundaries ==
A Senedd constituency comprising the boundaries of the UK Parliament constituencies of Newport East and Newport West and Islwyn, has been proposed by the Democracy and Boundary Commission Cymru for the 2026 election to the Senedd (Welsh Parliament; Senedd Cymru). It was initially proposed using the name Newport and Islwyn in September 2024, but was renamed to Casnewydd Islwyn in December proposals with most constituencies using Welsh-only names. The Welsh-only name and boundaries were confirmed in the commission's final recommendations in March 2025. When announcing their candidates, Reform UK used "Newport East, Newport West and Islwyn" instead, using the English names for the pair of UK Parliament constituencies that form it.

It encompasses the entire of the principal area (county borough) of Newport and parts of Caerphilly County Borough in South Wales. The constituency was established in 2026, following the passing of the Senedd Cymru (Members and Elections) Act 2024. The act legislates electoral reform of the Senedd to create 16 larger "super constituencies", pairing the 32 UK Parliament constituencies in Wales, and using a new fully proportional voting system, with each constituency electing six Members of the Senedd (MSs) rather than one previously.

== Members of the Senedd ==
Term	Election	Distribution	MS	MS	MS	MS	MS	MS
7th	2026	2 / 1 / 1 / 2	Dan Thomas (Ref)	Peredur Owen Griffiths (PC)	Art Wright (Ref)	Lyn Ackerman (PC)	Jayne Bryant (Lab)	Natasha Asghar (Con)

== Elections ==
=== Elections in the 2020s ===
2026 Senedd election: Casnewydd Islwyn
Party	Candidate	Votes	%	±%
Reform	Dan Thomas (E) Art Wright (E) Marie-Claire Lea Nicholas Jones Rebecca Senior Tomos Llewellyn	25,571	32.9	+31.3
Plaid Cymru	Peredur Owen Griffiths (E) Lyn Ackerman (E) Rhys Mills Josh Rawcliffe Jonathan Clark Sarah Henton	23,069	29.7	+20.0
Labour	Jayne Bryant (E) Rhianon Passmore Chris Carter Rhian Howells Julie Sangani Stephen Marshall David Chinnick	10,622	13.7	−32.3
Conservative	Natasha Asghar (E) Toby Jones Jake Enea Georgina Webb Adam Morris Rebecca Nyasha Mamhende	8,847	11.4	−17.6
Green	Lauren James Phil Davies Zaynab Greengrass Kerry Vosper David Mayer Andrew Were	5,898	7.6	+5.6
Liberal Democrats	Mike Hamilton John Miller Nurul Islam Harun Rashid Mary Lloyd Jeff Evans	2,683	3.5	−0.3
Open Party (UK)	Justna Muhith John Horan	435	0.6	New
Heritage	Mike Ford	349	0.4	New
Independent	Taran Clayton	224	0.3	−4.9
Majority		2,502	3.2	
Turnout		77,698		
Registered electors				
Reform win (new seat)				
Reform win (new seat)				
Plaid Cymru win (new seat)				
Plaid Cymru win (new seat)				
Labour win (new seat)				
Conservative win (new seat)				

2026 result
Party	Vote	%	Seats
Reform UK	25,571	32.9	2
Plaid Cymru	23,069	29.7	2
Labour	10,622	13.7	1
Conservative	8,847	11.4	1
Green	5,898	7.6	0
Liberal Democrats	2,683	3.5	0
Open Party	435	0.6	0
Heritage	349	0.4	0
Independent	224	0.3	0
