= Ynysddu RFC =

Welsh rugby union club, based in Ynysddu

(Wales) Ynysddu RFC
- Full name: Ynysddu Rugby Football Club
- Nickname: The Dee’s
- Founded: 1894; 132 years ago
- Location: Ynysddu, Wales
- Ground: The Welfare Ground
- Chairman: Shaun Rendall
- Captain: Matthew Browne
- League: WRU Division One East
- 2016/17: 2nd
1st kit	2nd kit

Official website
- www.ynysddurfc.co.uk

Ynysddu Rugby Football Club is a rugby union team from the village of Ynysddu in Wales. The club is a member of the Welsh Rugby Union and is a feeder club for the Newport Gwent Dragons.

Ynysddu RFC's first recorded match was against Abercarn in 1884 and was played on the church field at Mynyddislwyn. The club originally played in an all black strip until the 1920s when they switched to a red and black hooped kit.

Joshua Morrill is the clubs most successful captain of all time.
