= Bettws RFC =

(Wales) Bettws RFC
- Full name: Bettws Rugby Football Club
- Union: Welsh Rugby Union
- Nickname: The Tws
- Founded: 1983
- Location: Bettws, Wales
- Region: District A
- Ground: Ty-Coed Playing Fields (Capacity: 250)
- Chairman: Tom Harris
- Coach: Phil Norville (Forwards) Marcello Anderson (Backs) Mikey Thomas (Support) Rhys Norville (Fixture Secretary)
- Captain: Lewis Clayden
- League: WRU Division Four East
- 2022-2023: 2nd
Team kit

Bettws Rugby Football Club is a Welsh rugby union club based in Bettws, Newport in South Wales. It currently plays in the Welsh Rugby Union Division Five East.

Player	Position
Martin Williams	Prop
Johnny Robins	Prop
Chris Harris	Prop
Shaun Clarke	Prop
Anthony Matthews	Hooker
Scott Clarke	Hooker
Christopher Taylor	Hooker
Luke Stannard	Hooker
Jamie Witt	Lock
Steven Price	Lock
Phillip Norville	Lock/Back Row
Alan Stowe	Lock/Back Row
Kyle Williams	Lock/Back Row
Matthew Tapp	Back Row
Lewis Clayden	Flanker
Connor Mansfield	Flanker
Jonathan Gallingah	Flanker/Prop
Dewi Williams	Flanker
Rhys Clarke	Back Row
Kirk Baldwin	Scrum Half
Elliot Short	Scrum Half/Fly Half
Marcello Anderson	Fly Half
JayJay Whitehead	Fly Half
Gareth Busson	Centre
Wayne Whitehead	Centre
Lee Fletcher	Centre/Fly Half
Gavin Dymond	Centre
Moses Ikomba	Wing
Joseph Bevister	Wing
James Brabham	Wing
Ryan Bradford	Full back
Lloyd Sweetingham	Full Back
