= Geoff Whitson =

- Full name: Geoffrey Keith Whitson
- Born: 4 December 1930 Newport, Wales
- Died: 18 May 1984 (aged 53) Cresyceiliog, Wales

Rugby union career
- Position: Wing-forward
International career
Years	Team	Apps	(Points)
1956–60	Wales	3	(0)

Geoffrey Keith Whitson (4 December 1930 – 18 May 1984) was a Welsh international rugby union player.

Whitson was born in Newport, where he attended St Julian's High School.

An open-side wing-forward, Whitson began playing for hometown club Newport RFC in 1954, initially utilised as a wing three-quarter. He gained the first of his three Wales caps against France during the 1956 Five Nations, which they won to secure the championship. In 1957, Whitson got further experience against international opposition when he a member of the Newport that defeated the touring Wallabies. He was recalled by Wales for their 1960 Five Nations campaign, forming an all-Newport front-row for two fixtures, alongside Brian Cresswell and Glyn Davidge.

Whitson worked as a sports administrator and was employed by Torfaen Borough Council at the time of his death in 1984, when he suffered a suspected heart attack while driving on Llantarnam Road in Cwmbran.

== See also ==
- List of Wales national rugby union players
