= Frank Purdon =

Wales international rugby union footballer

- Born: Frank Thomas Purdon; 8 November 1857 County Westmeath, Ireland
- Notable relative(s): Billy Geen, nephew
- Occupation: clerk

Rugby union career
- Position(s): Forward, Half-back
Amateur team(s)
Years	Team	Apps	(Points)
- Machen RFC
1880-1887	Newport RFC		
1882-?	Swansea RFC		
International career
Years	Team	Apps	(Points)
1881–1883	Wales	4	(0)

Frank Thomas Purdon (8 November 1857 – ?) was an Irish-born rugby union forward who played club rugby for Newport and Swansea. Purdon was capped four times for Wales including the first Wales international, against England in 1881.

== Rugby career ==
Purdon was selected, while a Newport player, for Richard Mullock's Wales to face England in the first Welsh international at Blackheath on 19 February 1881. Wales were humiliated, and the national press blamed the team selection, with the players apparently chosen to appease the principal rugby clubs rather than selected on the basis of ability. Many of the Welsh players from that game never played for Wales again, but Purdon was back for Wales second international game, played in 1882 against Ireland in Dublin.

Purdon played his last two matches for Wales after transferring to Swansea, and was a member of the Welsh squad that took part in the first Home Nations Championship under the captaincy of Charles Lewis. Wales lost both games and Purdon was not re-selected for the 1884 tournament.

=== International matches played ===
Wales

- England 1881, 1882
- Ireland 1882
- Scotland 1883

== Bibliography ==
- Goodwin, Terry (1984). The International Rugby Championship 1883-1983. London: Willows Books. ISBN 0-00-218060-X.
- Smith, David; Williams, Gareth (1980). Fields of Praise: The Official History of The Welsh Rugby Union. Cardiff: University of Wales Press. ISBN 0-7083-0766-3.
