= Terry Cobner =

British Lions & Wales international rugby union footballer

- Born: Terence John Cobner; 10 January 1946 (age 80) Blaenavon, Wales
- School: West Monmouth School
- University: Madeley College, Staffordshire

Rugby union career
- Position: Flanker
Amateur team(s)
Years	Team	Apps	(Points)
- Blaenavon RFC
1968-1981	Pontypool RFC	419	(472)
–	Walsall RFC		
1973-1977	Barbarian F.C.	3	(0)
–	Gwent		
–	Staffordshire		
International career
Years	Team	Apps	(Points)
1974-1978	Wales	19	(8)
1977	British & Irish Lions	3	(0)

WRU Director (head) of Rugby
- In office 1996–2004
- Preceded by: Position established
- Succeeded by: Joe Lydon

President of the Welsh Rugby Union
- Incumbent
- Assumed office 2023
- Preceded by: Gerald Davies

Personal details
- Profession: Schoolmaster

Terence John Cobner (born 10 January 1946) is a former Welsh international rugby union player and British Lion. After his rugby playing career, Cobner became director of rugby for Wales' WRU in 1996, and President of the WRU as of 2023. He was born in Blaenavon, Monmouthshire and lives in Pontypool.

== Welsh international and British Lion ==
A back row forward, or flanker, he scored a try on his debut against Scotland in 1974 at the age of 28, and went on to gain a total of 19 caps for Wales and score a total of two tries, the second coming against France in 1975. A born leader, he captained Wales in the non-cap international against Argentina in 1976 and was Wales tour Captain to Australia in 1978. He was Welsh player of the year in 1974 and 1978. Unlucky not to be picked for the British Lions in 1974 he toured with the British Lions in 1977 to New Zealand where he played in three of the four tests, and virtually took over as captain of the tour from Phil Bennett in its latter stages and became the unofficial forwards coach.

== Pontypool captain for ten years ==
He played his club rugby for Pontypool RFC, making his debut at Cheltenham on 13 April 1968. He was top try scorer in 1969/70 with 12 and Player of the Year in 1970–1. He captained the club for a record 10 seasons (from 1969 to 1979), scoring 118 trys in 419 appearances, and making his final appearance at Abertillery in October 1981. He was one of Pontypool's greatest ever players.

== WRU President ==
Cobner came out of an almost 20 year retirement and was appointed the position of Welsh Rugby Union President as of October 2023, he replaced Gerald Davies as the 51st president. He previously held the position of Wales' WRU first ever director of rugby between 1996 and 2004 before retiring early.
