= Leighton Jenkins =

Welsh rugby union player

- Full name: Leighton Hugh Jenkins
- Born: 1 July 1931 New Tredegar, Wales
- Died: 7 May 2020 (aged 88) Lincolnshire, England
- School: Tredegar Grammar School
- Occupation: RAF officer

Rugby union career
- Position: No. 8
International career
Years	Team	Apps	(Points)
1954–56	Wales	5	(0)

Leighton Hugh Jenkins MBE (1 July 1931 — 7 May 2020) was a Welsh international rugby union player of the 1950s and a Wing Commander in the Royal Air Force.

Jenkins was born in New Tredegar and attended Tredegar Grammar School.

A number eight, Jenkins won five Wales caps, debuting against Ireland at Lansdowne Road in 1954. He appeared in all four matches of their title winning 1956 Five Nations Championship campaign.

Jenkins spent his career with Bath, Bedwas, Combined Services, Leicester, London Welsh, Loughborough Colleges, Newport and the RAF. He was captain of the Newport side that beat Australia in 1957 and scored the second of his team's two tries. In 1962, Jenkins captained Combined Services on a tour of East Africa.

== See also ==
- List of Wales national rugby union players
