= Cliff Ashton =

Welsh rugby union player

- Full name: Clifford Ashton
- Born: 17 December 1932 Cwmavon, Wales
- Died: 29 March 2001 (aged 68) Newport, Wales

Rugby union career
- Position: Outside-half
International career
Years	Team	Apps	(Points)
1959–62	Wales	7	(3)

Clifford Ashton (17 December 1932 – 29 March 2001) was a Welsh international rugby union player.

== Biography ==
Born in Cwmavon, Neath Port Talbot, Ashton was an elusive outside-half and skilled drop-goal exponent, capped seven times for Wales from 1959 to 1962, while a Aberavon RFC player.

Ashton later played for Chepstow, soon after relocating to the town in 1962.

== See also ==
- List of Wales national rugby union players
