= Elliot Colliery Steam Winding Engine =

Preserved stationary steam engine

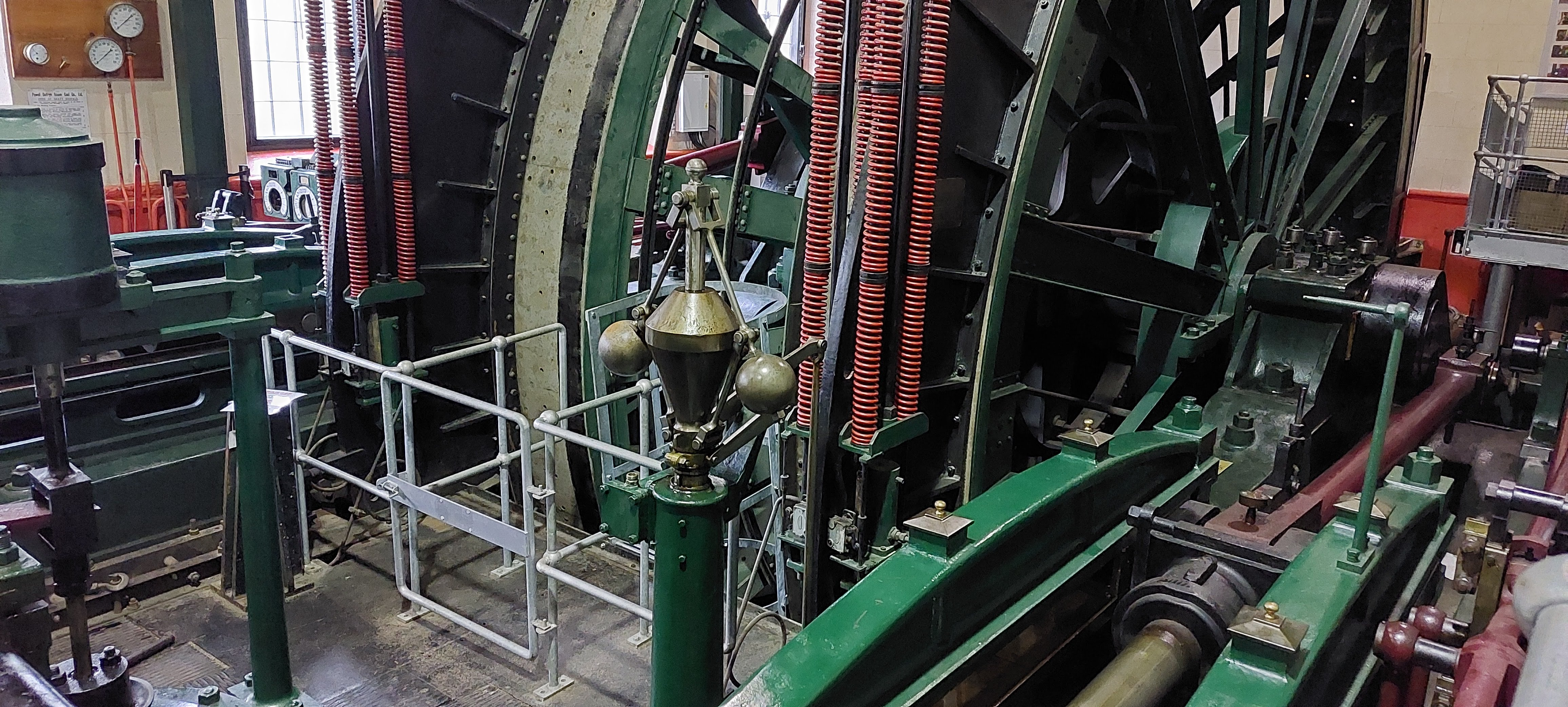

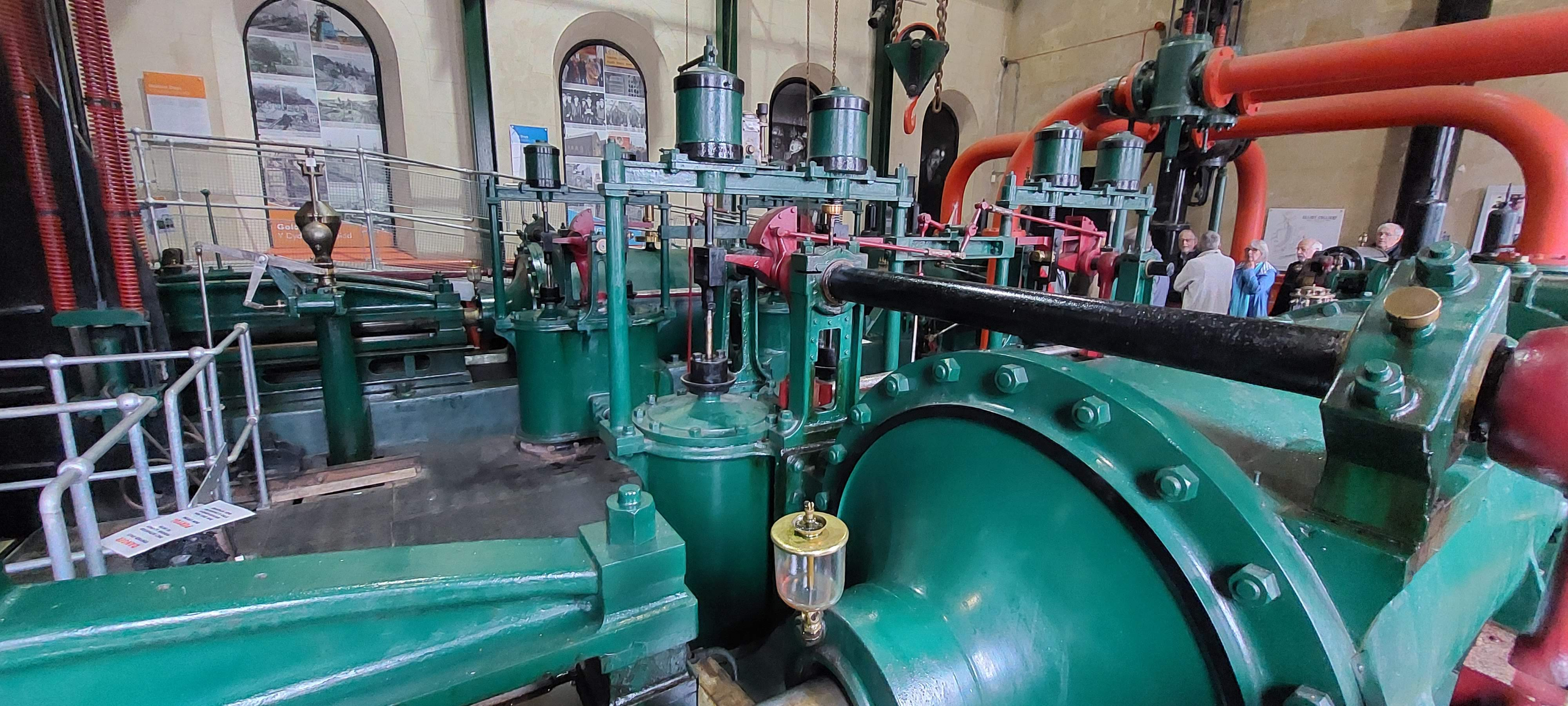
Visitors viewing the Elliot Colliery Steam Winding Engine

The Elliot Colliery Steam Winding Engine was installed in August 1891 by Thornewill and Warham at Elliot Colliery in New Tredegar, Wales. It consisted of two horizontal cylinders each 42 inches in diameter, both having a 6-foot stroke, with a Cornish type valve gear. Engine No. 603 was a twin tandem compound model.

In 1904 the engine was upgraded with two high-pressure cylinders, operated by way of Corliss valve gear.

The steam engine unusually continued to wind coal and men up and down the East Pit mine shaft until the mine closed in 1967, by which time most other collieries had long switched to electric power.

In 1998 Caerphilly County Borough Council restored the engine and the grade II* listed winding house.

On 1 April 2006 the attraction was closed for a £2.5 million upgrade.

In early 2024 the engine and visitors centre was closed by Caerphilly County Borough Council, but volunteers continue to operate the engine on the last Saturday of each month. The engine can be seen working at one sixth its full speed driven not by steam, but instead by an electric motor.
