= Abercarn RFC =

Welsh rugby union club, based in Abercarn

(Wales) Abercarn RFC
- Full name: Abercarn Rugby Football Club
- Founded: 1895; 131 years ago
- Location: Abercarn, Caerphilly
- Ground: Abercarn Welfare Ground
- Chairman: Gareth Peebles
- League: WRU League 3 East
- 23/24: 2nd

Abercarn RFC who play at Abercarn Welfare Ground currently play in WRU Division 2 after being promoted after coming 2nd in Division 3 during the 23/34 league. Abercarn RFC is also a Feeder Club for Dragons RFC.

== Club history ==
Abercarn is a club with a long history having been founded over 100 years ago. In 1950 Abercarn RFC lost three members of their club including their club captain, Don Rowlands and coach, Ray Box in the Llandow air disaster. The event is remembered by the club in their team badge, with a plane propeller sitting in its centre.

Abercarn RFC have produced some famous players including Paul Turner (Newport RFC, Pontypool RFC, Newport Gwent Dragons Coach) and Nathan Budgett (Wales & Bristol RFC).

Abercarn currently plays at the Welfare Ground, at the rear of Cwmcarn High School.

For the start of the 2009/2010 season, Abercarn RFC has reintroduced a development team known as the 'Abercarn Devils' who compete in the Worthington Gwent 2nd XV Division. The Devils play their home fixtures on Cwmcarn School Fields.

Former outside half Ben Farley made the locally hugely controversial move to rivals Risca RFC in the summer of 2010, the first time this has happened since 1937.

== Notable former players ==
- Norman Harris (7 caps for Wales rugby league)
- (Wales) Dicky Ralph (6 caps)
- (Wales) David 'Dai' Rees

== Club honours ==
- 2008-09 WRU Division Five East - Champions
- 2009-10 SWALEC Bowl - Champions
