= New Tredegar RFC =

(Wales) New Tredegar RFC
- Full name: New Tredegar Rugby Football Club
- Nickname: Newts
- Founded: 1977
- Location: New Tredegar, Wales
- Ground: Grove Park
- Coach(es): Warren Davies; Timothy Scarfe; Julian Willets
- League: WRU Division 6 East
- 2025-2026: 1st
Team kit

Official website
- www.newtredegarrfc.com

New Tredegar Rugby Football Club is a Welsh rugby union club team based in New Tredegar. Today, New Tredegar RFC plays in the Welsh Rugby Union, Division Six East League and is a feeder club for the Newport Gwent Dragons. At present the club runs one senior side and a full junior section along with flourishing girls teams.

New Tredegar RFC started life in 1977 when it was decided that a senior XV team was required to permit the youth players, who had a team in since the early 1960s, to play locally at a higher level. By 1980 the club was fielding a second senior XV and after joining the Gwent District league in 1994 the team won their first piece of silverware, the Cyrus Davies cup. The club achieved WRU status that year and in the 1995/96 season the club was placed in the lower rungs of the official Welsh leagues. Although they lost their opening match to Machen, they eventually gained in confidence to win the league in their first season. In 1999 the club managed to buy the Liberal Club which has now become their headquarters.

Following their expulsion from the league at the end of the 23/24 season, they re-entered the league from a lower position. They also rebranded as, The New Tredegar Phonenix. They recruited; Warren Davies (Head Coach), from Hirwain, Julian Willets (Forwards Coach), previously of New Tredegar and Timothy Scarfe (Skills and Defence), Wales Under 16s and Pontypool Schools. These all brought significant changes to New Tredegar.

They won their first season in Division 6, being crowned champions in March 2025. During the season, led my Captain Craig Thomas, they amassed 446 points for with only 34 against, losing only 1 game all season.

== Club honours ==
- 1995/96 WRU Welsh League Division Eight East - Champions
- 2011/12 Swalec Bowl Finalists

Millennium Stadium - Runners Up

- 2024/25 Division 6 East - Winners
