= St. Joseph's RFC =

(Wales) St Joseph's RFC
- Full name: St Joseph's Rugby Football Club
- Nickname: The Joe's
- Founded: 1959
- Location: Cardiff, Wales
- Chairman: Simon Matthews
- Coach: Chris Czekaj David Walsh. Tom Rowlands luke Egan.
- League: WRU Division 1 East Central
Team kit

Official website
- www.stjosephsrfc.mywru.co.uk

St Joseph's Rugby Football Club are a Welsh rugby union team based in Cardiff, South Wales. They formed in 1959 and in 1984 applied for and became members of the Welsh Rugby Union. St Joseph's RFC are currently in National League 1 (East Central), and part of the regional pathway for the Cardiff Blues.

St Joseph's have a friendly rivalry with St. Peters RFC, another Cardiff team with a strong Catholic heritage. Matches between the two have been described as playing for "The Vatican bragging rights" by BBC sports commentators.
