= WRU Division Six East =

Welsh rugby union league

- Founded: 1995
- No. of teams: 10
- Country: Wales
- Most recent champion: Caerleon RFC (2011–12)
- Level on pyramid: 7
- Website: www.wru.co.uk/eng/club/swalecleagues/index.php

The Welsh Rugby Union Division Six East (also called the SWALEC Division Six East for sponsorship reasons) is a rugby union league in Wales.

== Competition ==
There are 10 clubs in the WRU Division Six East. During the course of a season (which lasts from September to May) each club plays the others twice, once at their home ground and once at the home ground of their opponents for a total of 18 games for each club, with a total of 90 games in each season. Teams receive four points for a win and two point for a draw, an additional bonus point is awarded to either team if they score four tries or more in a single match. No points are awarded for a loss though the losing team can gain a bonus point for finishing the match within seven points of the winning team. Teams are ranked by total points, then the number of tries scored and then points difference. At the end of each season, the club with the most points is crowned as champion. If points are equal the tries scored then points difference determines the winner.

=== Sponsorship ===
In 2008 the Welsh Rugby Union announced a new sponsorship deal for the club rugby leagues with SWALEC valued at £1 million (GBP). The initial three year sponsorship was extended at the end of the 2010/11 season, making SWALEC the league sponsors until 2015. The leagues sponsored are the WRU Divisions one through to seven.

- (2007–2008) No sponsor as league created during sponsorship term.
- (2008–2015) SWALEC

== 2010/2011 Season ==
=== League teams ===
- Aberbeeg RFC
- Aberbargoed RFC
- Abertysswg RFC
- Beaufort RFC
- Blaina United RFC
- Cefn Fforest RFC
- Cwm RFC
- Forgeside RFC
- Markham RFC
- Trefil RFC

== 2009/2010 Season ==
=== League teams ===
- Aberbeeg RFC
- Aberbargoed RFC
- Abertysswg RFC
- Beaufort RFC
- Blaina United RFC
- Cefn Fforest RFC
- Cwm RFC
- Forgeside RFC
- Markham RFC
- Trefil RFC

=== League table ===
2009-2010 WRU Division Six East League Table
Club	Played	Won	Drawn	Lost	Points for	Points against	Tries For	Tries Against	Try Bonus	Losing Bonus	Points
Beaufort RFC	18	15	2	1	614	170	89	16	12	1	77
Abertysswg Falcons	18	15	0	3	492	243	59	26	8	2	70
Cefn Fforest RFC	18	14	0	4	489	187	69	15	7	3	66
Trefil RFC	18	12	1	5	388	214	54	24	7	1	58
Markham RFC	18	10	0	8	386	354	46	45	6	2	48
Aberbargoed RFC	18	6	2	10	393	337	50	39	5	3	36
Forgeside RFC	18	6	2	10	264	385	38	51	5	1	34
Blaina United RFC	18	2	1	15	225	526	25	77	2	5	17
Cwm RFC	18	3	1	14	187	485	16	66	0	2	16
Aberbeeg RFC	18	2	1	15	199	736	22	109	1	1	12
Correct as of 5 August 2010

== 2008/2009 Season ==
=== League teams ===
- Abertysswg RFC
- Beaufort RFC
- Blackwood Stars RFC
- Caerleon RFC
- Crickhowell RFC
- Hartridge RFC
- Markham RFC
- New Panteg RFC
- St. Julians HSOB RFC
- Whiteheads RFC

== 2007/2008 Season ==
- Beaufort RFC
- Blackwood Stars RFC
- Caerleon RFC
- Crickhowell RFC
- Hartridge RFC
- Markham RFC
- New Panteg RFC
- St. Julians HSOB RFC
- Trefil RFC
- Whiteheads RFC
