= Pontllanfraith RFC =

- Full name: Pontllanfraith Rugby Football Club
- Nickname(s): The Fraith
- Location: Pontllanfraith, Wales
- Ground(s): Welfare Ground (The Granny)
- Coach(es): Adam Chant; Chris Rooke
- Captain(s): Huw Meyrick (season 2024:25)
- League(s): WRU Division Four East
- 2nd
Team kit

Official website
- www.pitchero.com/clubs/pontllanfraith/

Pontllanfraith Rugby Football Club is a Welsh rugby union team based in Pontllanfraith. The club successfully gained membership to the Welsh Rugby Union in 1998. Today, Pontllanfraith RFC is a member of the Welsh Rugby Union and is a feeder club for the Newport Gwent Dragons.

== Club honours ==
2005/06 WRU Division Four East - Champions

2022/23 Beach Rugby Wales - Champions

2023/24 Beach Rugby Wales - Champions

2023/24 WRU Division Five East - Champions

== Notable players ==
- Matthew 'Trev' Davis
