= Paul Turner (rugby union) =

Wales international rugby union footballer

- Born: Paul Turner; 13 February 1960 (age 66) Newbridge, Monmouthshire

Rugby union career
- Position: Outside half
Senior career
Years	Team	Apps	(Points)
- Crumlin RFC
–	Pontypool RFC		
–	Newbridge RFC		
–	Newport RFC		
International career
Years	Team	Apps	(Points)
1988–1989	Wales	3	(0)
- Correct as of 19 May 2008
Coaching career
- Years: Team
- 1992–1996: Sale FC
- 1996–1998: Bedford RFC
- 1999: Saracens
- 1999–2001: Rugby Lions
- 2001-2001: Gloucester
- 2002–2005: Harlequins
- 2005–2011: Newport Gwent Dragons
- 2011: Wasps
- 2012–Present: Ampthill RFC
- Correct as of 12 June 2014

Paul Turner (born 13 February 1960) is a Welsh rugby union coach and former player, currently coach of English club Ampthill.

As a player, he played for Crumlin, Pontypool, Newbridge and Newport as an outside half. He won 3 caps for Wales in 1988 and 1989.

He has coached Sale, Bedford, Saracens, Rugby Lions, Gloucester, Harlequins, Newport Gwent Dragons, Wasps and, since 2012, Ampthill.

international

== Playing career ==
Turner was born in Newbridge.

An outside-half, he was a prolific goal-kicker and is the joint record points holder for Newbridge, and still holds the club's points scoring record of 405 points from season 1983–84. He remains the only back capped from Newbridge.

He also played for Pontypool, Newport, Bedford and Sale. He represented Wales on three times and played for the Barbarians invitational side three times.

Turner represented Crawshays and the Penguins at the Hong Kong Sevens in 1985, 1987 and 1988.

== Coaching career ==
Turner left Newport RFC and became player/coach at Sale FC in 1992, leaving in 1996 to join Bedford RFC as player/Head Coach, taking both clubs into the English Premiership during his tenure. In 1998/99 he joined Saracens as backs coach and then spent 2 seasons at Rugby Lions as player/coach, winning promotion to Division 1. In 2001 he left Rugby Lions to work under Philippe Saint-André at Gloucester, winning the inaugural Premiership Grand Final. He moved on to Harlequins as backs coach from 2002 to 2005. In 2005 he was appointed head coach for the Newport Gwent Dragons and he stepped down in February 2011. He was Magners league coach of the year for the 2010 season. In July 2011 he was appointed attack and skills coach at Wasps He is currently Head Coach at National 1 side Ampthill RFC.

== Other interests ==
Turner founded his own rugby consultancy business "Paul Turner Rugby" in April 2012 and worked as a rugby consultant on the grassroots rugby programme "Inside Welsh Rugby". In 2014, he rebranded the company as "Paul Turner Sport", offering additional services to complement his coaching.
