= Lyn Ackerman =

Welsh politician

Lyn Ackerman MS
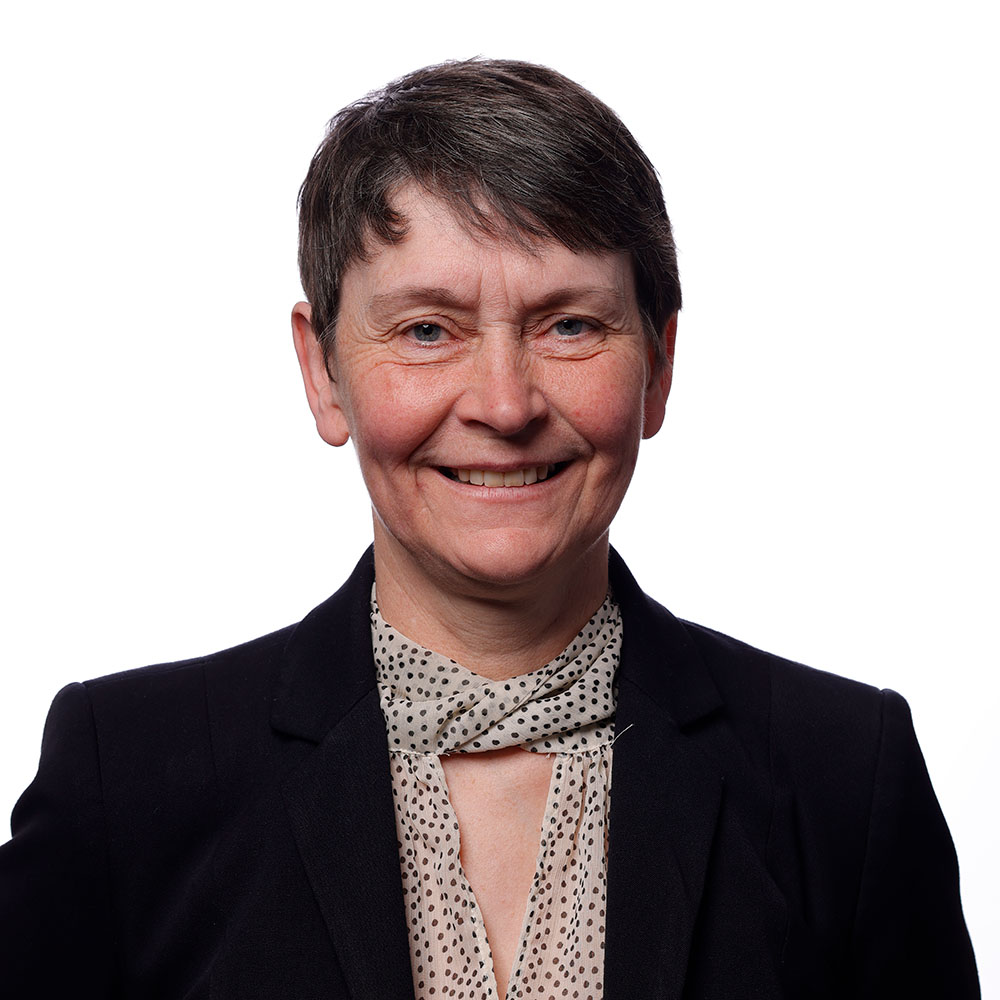
- Official portrait, 2026

Member of the Senedd
- Incumbent
- Assumed office 8 May 2026
- Constituency: Casnewydd Islwyn

Personal details
- Born: August 1964 (age 61)
- Party: Plaid Cymru

Lyn Ackerman is a Welsh Plaid Cymru politician who has been a Member of the Senedd (MS) for Casnewydd Islwyn since 2026.

== Biography ==
Ackerman was Plaid Cymru's candidate for the Islwyn constituency at the 2015 general election. Ackerman was the candidate for Torfaen in the 2021 Senedd election. She was a councillor in Newbridge, Caerphilly from 1999 to 2017, when she did not stand. She stood again to represent an altered version of the Newbridge ward in 2022, but was not elected.

In the 2026 Senedd election, Ackerman was elected as a MS for the Casnewydd Islwyn constituency.
