= New Tredegar =

Town in Caerphilly, Wales

New Tredegar: Welsh: Tredegar Newydd
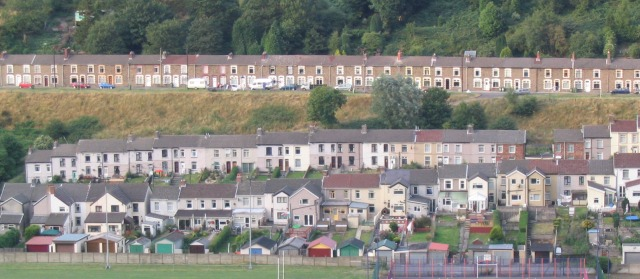
- Terraced houses in New Tredegar

- Location within Caerphilly
- Population: 4,966
- OS grid reference: SO143032
- Principal area: Caerphilly
- Preserved county: Gwent
- Country: Wales
- Sovereign state: United Kingdom
- Post town: NEW TREDEGAR
- Postcode district: NP24
- Dialling code: 01443
- Police: Gwent
- Fire: South Wales
- Ambulance: Welsh
- UK Parliament: Blaenau Gwent and Rhymney
- Senedd Cymru – Welsh Parliament: Blaenau Gwent Caerffili Rhymni
- List of places UK Wales Caerphilly 51°43′18″N 3°14′25″W Map of the community

New Tredegar (Welsh: Tredegar Newydd) is a former mining town and community in the Rhymney Valley, Caerphilly county borough, Wales, within the historic boundaries of Monmouthshire. The community is along the Rhymney River. The area is rich in the mining heritage of the South Wales mining industry.

Along with other parts of Rhymney, New Tredegar has Welsh speakers in the community. The Welsh-only monuments in the local cemetery testify to the strength of the language locally in the first quarter of the 20th century.

== Facilities ==
The community has the Tir-phil railway station on the Rhymney line.

=== Education ===
The area is supported by two primary schools: White Rose Primary school and Phillipstown Primary school.

=== Heritage ===
New Tredegar is home to The Winding House, a county museum which opened in 2008. It is controlled by CCBC Museums service and the Friends of the Winding House community group.

=== Sport ===
Capel Golf Club (now defunct) first appeared in the mid-1930s and continued into the 1950s.

New Tredegar RFC sits in Division 6 of Welsh Rugby Union League and is coached by Warren Davies, Julian Willetts, and Timothy Scarfe. Scarfe also coaches Wales Under 16s and Pontypool District Schools Rugby.

=== Religion ===
The area also contains a number of religious buildings including Saint Dingat's Church, and the Presbyterian Church of Wales.

== Notable people ==
See Category:People from New Tredegar

- Darcy Blake (born 1988), professional footballer, was born in New Tredegar.
- Pam Gems (1925–2011), notable playwright, lived in New Tredegar from 1984–1993.
- Leighton Jenkins (1931—2020), Welsh international rugby union player, RAF commander.
- E. Joy Johnson (1876–1946), US novelist, born in the town.
- Gerald Jones (born 1970), MP for Merthyr Tydfil and Aberdare.
- Gwyn Jones (1907–1999), novelist and story writer.
- Linden Jones (born 1961), professional footballer, was born in New Tredegar.
- Tim Rhys-Evans MBE (born c. 1972), was a vocal tutor at the Royal Welsh College of Music and Drama.
- Eliot Richards (born 1991), professional footballer, was born in New Tredegar.

== Politics ==
The community is represented by Mark Evans and Eluned Stenner on the Caerphilly County Borough Council. They both represent Labour and were elected in the 2022 election.

== Businesses ==
New Tredegar is home to Zipline Creative, a TV production company.

AJM Sewing, one of the last UK-based underwear and swimming costume manufacturers, was based in a converted chapel in New Tredegar but went into liquidation in 2018.
