= Usk RFC =

Welsh rugby union club, based in Usk

(Wales) Usk RFC
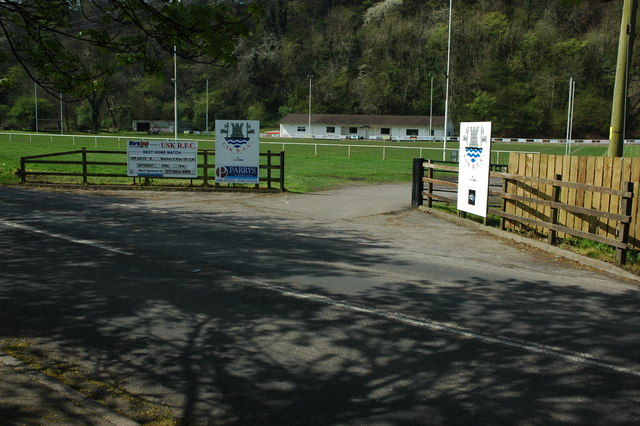
- Full name: Usk Rugby Football Club
- Founded: 1874; 152 years ago
- Location: Usk, Monmouthshire
- Ground: Red Shed Meadow
- President: Lyn Jones
- Coach: Josh Guy
- League: WRU Division 2 East
Team kit

Official website
- www.uskrfc.co.uk

Usk Rugby Football Club is a Welsh rugby union club based in the historic town of Usk in South Wales. Usk RFC is a member of the Welsh Rugby Union and is a feeder club for the Newport Gwent Dragons.

Usk RFC's first recorded rugby match was against Newport in 1874. It is believed that rugby has been played in Usk from that date apart from during the two World Wars when official rugby ceased to be played in Wales.

An ad first appeared on 17/12/1859 in "The Illustrated Usk Observer and Raglan Herald", where someone by the name of "A LOVER OF FOOTBALL" suggested the formation of an USK FOOTBALL CLUB.
