= Gwernyfed RFC =

(Wales) Gwernyfed RFC
- Full name: Gwernyfed Rugby Football Club
- Nickname(s): Green, White & Blacks
- Founded: 1965
- Location: Talgarth, Wales
- Ground(s): Trefecca Road
- Chairman: Gareth Davies
- Coach(es): Lee Thomas, Alun Phillips, Tomi Lewis, Jordan Curran
- League(s): WRU Division Three South East
- 2011-12: 8th
Team kit

Official website
- www.grfc.btik.com/p_Home.ikml

Gwernyfed RFC is a rugby union club based in the town of Talgarth, near Brecon, in Powys, Wales. Gwernyfed RFC is a member of the Welsh Rugby Union and is a feeder club for the Cardiff Blues.

Gwernyfed RFC was founded in 1965 by two school teachers from Gwernyfed High School and initially played in the Neath & District Junior Rugby Union. During the early years the club played on the school's rugby pitch and used the New Inn public house in Talgarth as a makeshift clubhouse. A pitch was later obtained when a local farmer allowed use of a field in Talgarth, which became the club's home ground. In September 1990 the club managed to obtain sufficient funds to purchase a property on Trefecca road in Talgarth which is now the official clubhouse. In 1996 the club applied for and was successful in gaining membership to the Welsh Rugby Union.

The club today fields a firsts, seconds, ladies, youth and junior teams.

== Club honours ==
- 2007-08 WRU Division Four East Champions.
- 2024-25 WRU Division Four East Champions
- Tomi Lewis: A product of Gwernyfed’s junior ranks. He has represented Wales at U18, U20, and in Wales Sevens.
- Tilly Vucaj: Also started playing for Gwernyfed as a child. She has earned a senior international cap for Wales and has been selected in the Wales squad for the Women’s Rugby World Cup 2025.
