= Art Wright =

Welsh politician

Art Wright MS
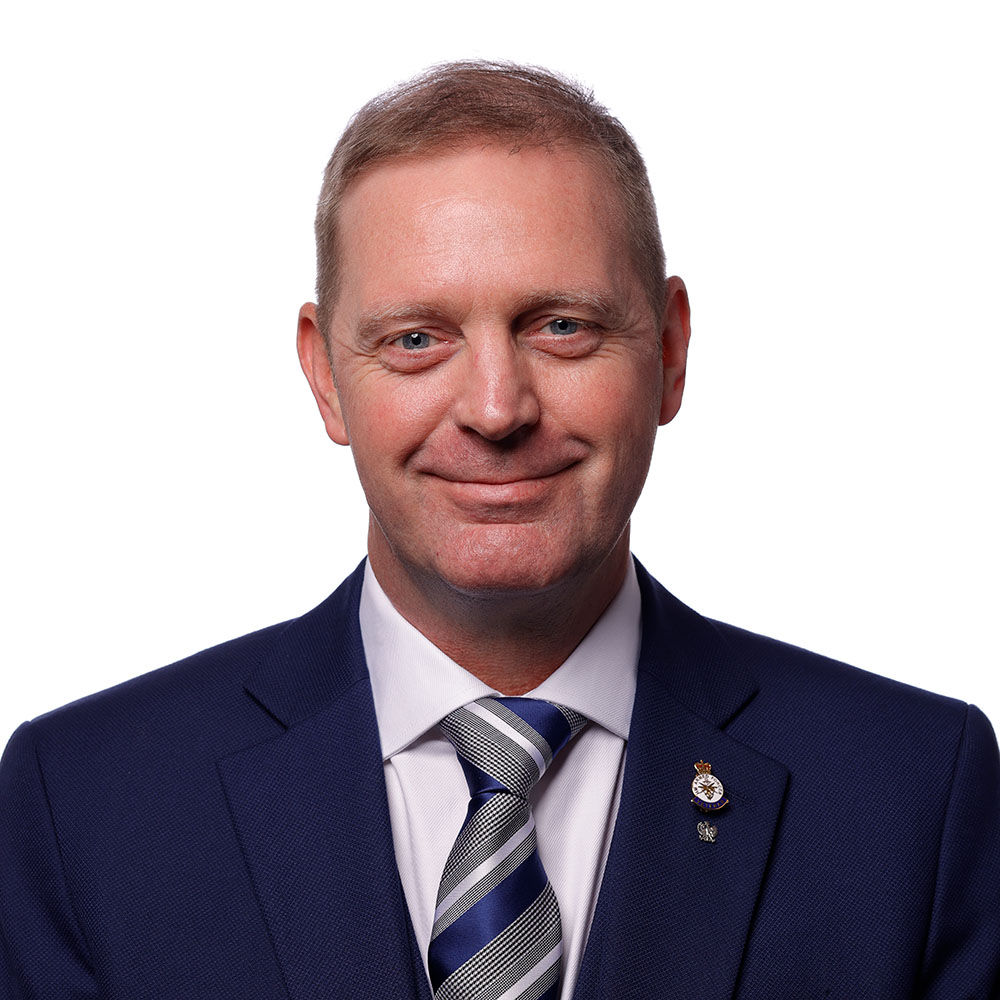
- Official portrait, 2026

Member of the Senedd for Casnewydd Islwyn
- Incumbent
- Assumed office 8 May 2026
- Preceded by: Constituency established

Personal details
- Party: Reform UK

Arthur Wright is a Welsh politician serving as a Member of the Senedd for Casnewydd Islwyn representing Reform UK Wales.

He served in the British Army for twenty years.

Wright made a "small bit of history" on 2 June 2026, when he was the first MS to ask a question to the new First Minister, Rhun ap Iorwerth, at his first FMQs. He caused some confusion when he asked a question in the Senedd on 10 June 2026 when he raised a question to Plaid Cymru minister, Sioned Williams, about providing same sex spaces in Wales in accordance with the law. When given the opportunity to ask a follow-up question he, instead, read a pre-prepared statement and sat down.
