= Peredur Owen Griffiths =

Welsh politician (born 1978)

Peredur Owen Griffiths MS
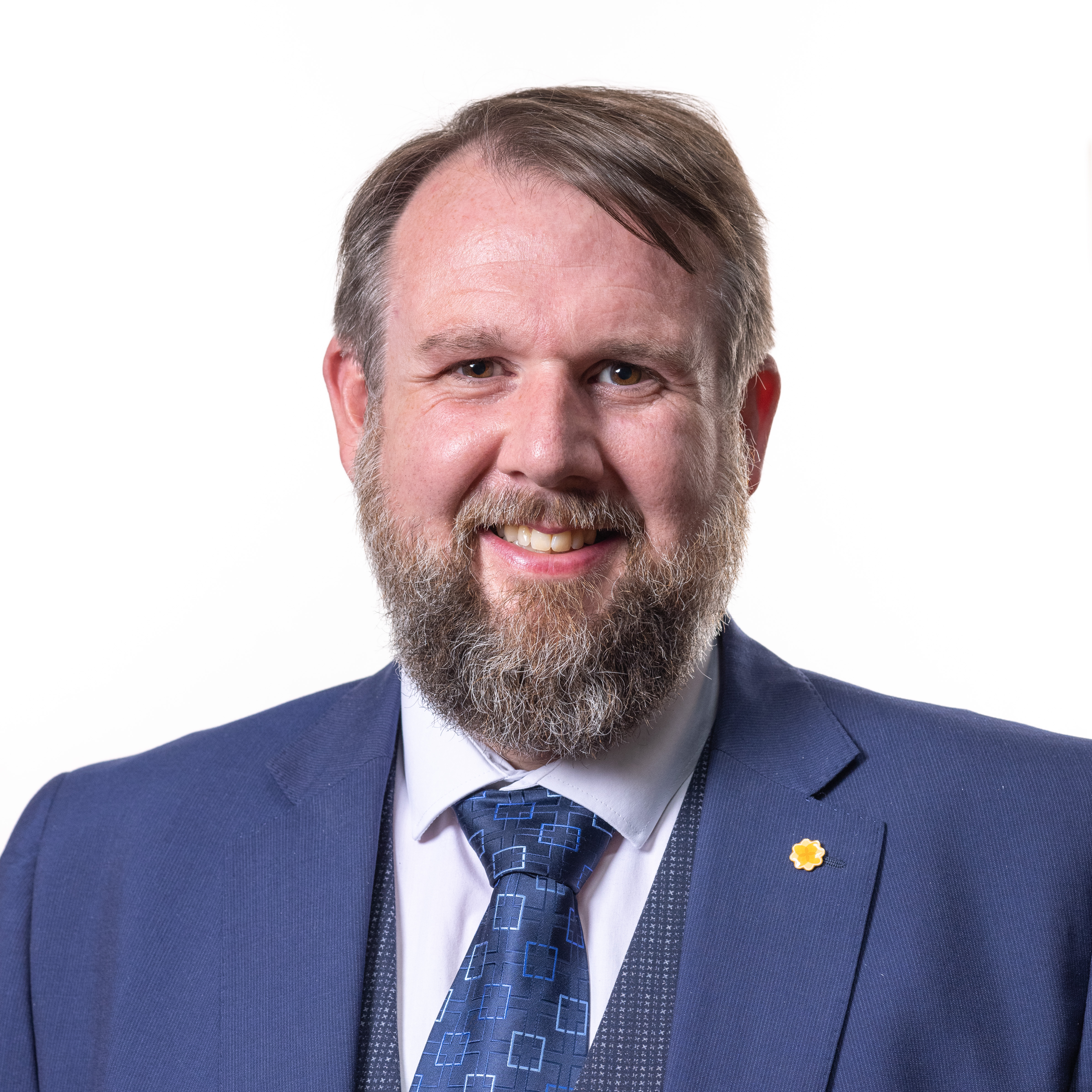
- Griffiths in 2021

Member of the Senedd
- Incumbent
- Assumed office 8 May 2021
- Constituency: South Wales East (2021–2026); Casnewydd Islwyn (2026–)

Personal details
- Born: October 1978 (age 47)
- Party: Plaid Cymru
- Education: University of Sheffield
- Occupation: Politician and charity worker
- Website: https://senedd.wales/people/peredur-owen-griffiths-ms/

Peredur Owen Griffiths (born October 1978) is a Welsh Plaid Cymru politician who has served as a Member of the Senedd (MS) for Casnewydd Islwyn since 2026 and, previously, the South Wales East region between 2021 and 2026.

== Education ==
Griffths attended Ysgol Glan Clwyd. He has a master's degree in control systems engineering from the University of Sheffield.

== Career ==
Prior to his political career, Griffiths worked in banking. He was a bank manager for Santander before working for the Principality Building Society. He worked in the financial services sector for 13 years.

He later worked for Christian Aid as Regional Co-ordinator for South Wales, and Legacy Officer for Wales.

== Political career ==
Griffiths previously ran in the Blaenau Gwent constituency at the 2019 United Kingdom general election.

Griffiths was Member of the Senedd (MS) for the South Wales East region from 2021 to 2026. In the 2026 Senedd election, the regional seats were abolished and replaced with multi-member constituencies. Griffiths was the first candidate on the Plaid Cymru list for the constituency of Casnewydd Islwyn and was the second MS elected for the seat.

In the 2021-2026 Senedd, Griffiths was chair of the Senedd Finance Committee, and a member of the Llywydd's Committee, Petitions Committee, and Standards of Conduct Committee. He chaired the cross-party group on Substance Use and Addiction, was vice-chair of the group on Intergenerational Solidarity and was a member of groups on: Children in our Care, Co-operatives and Mutuals, Coeliac Disease & Dermatitis Herpetiformis, Deaf Issues, Diabetes, Disability, Friends of Ukraine, Gambling Related Harm, Hospice and Palliative Care, Housing, Industrial Communities, Music, Older People and Ageing, Policing and Public Transport.

In 2024, Griffiths tabled a motion, co-signed by Welsh Labour's John Griffiths, the Welsh Liberal Democrats' Jane Dodds and Welsh Conservatives' Darren Millar supporting recognition of a Palestinian State as a path to a Two-state solution.

== Music ==
He is a member of the Welsh language choir, Cor CF1, and has been Chair of International Choral Festival Wales.
