= Crumlin RFC =

Welsh rugby union football club

(Wales) Crumlin RFC
- Full name: Crumlin Rugby Football Club
- Founded: 1880
- Location: Crumlin, Wales
- Ground: The Kayfield (Capacity: 500)
- Chairman: John Townsend
- President: I. McCarthy
- League: WRU Division Four East
- 2022-23: 1st
Team kit

Official website
- www.crumlinrfc.co.uk

Crumlin Rugby Football Club is a rugby union team from the village of Crumlin near Caerphilly in Wales. The club is a member of the Welsh Rugby Union and is a feeder club for the Newport Gwent Dragons.

== Club honours ==
- 2007/08 WRU Division Five East - Champions
- 2021/22 WRU Division Five East - Champions
- 2021/22 WRU Plate - Finalists
- 2022/23 WRU Division Five Cup Winners
- 2022/23 WRU Division Five East- Champions

== Notable past players ==
- (Wales) Percy Coldrick (6 caps)
- (Wales) Arthur Lewis (11 caps & 1971 Lions tour)
- (Wales) David Nash
- (Wales) Paul Turner
- (Wales) Mike Watkins (4 caps)
- (Wales) Billy Williams dual-code (4 caps union), (5 caps league)
