= Glyn Davidge =

Welsh international rugby player

- Born: Glyn David Davidge; 31 December 1933 Newport, Wales
- Died: 18 March 2006 (aged 72) Newport, Swansea
- Height: 6 ft 2 in (188 cm)
- Weight: 13 st 8 lb (190 lb; 86 kg)

Rugby union career
- Position: Flanker
Amateur team(s)
Years	Team	Apps	(Points)
- Tredegar RFC
1952-1965	Chepstow RFC		
–	Newport RFC		
International career
Years	Team	Apps	(Points)
1959-1962	Wales	9	(0)
1962	British Lions	0	(0)

Glyn Davidge (31 December 1933 – 18 March 2006) was a Welsh international flanker who played club rugby for Tredegar, Chepstow and Newport. He was awarded nine caps for Wales and toured with Arthur Smith's 1962 British Lions squad.

== Club career ==
During the 1952–53 season, at the age of 18, Davidge played for Newport having previously been a member of Tredegar and Chepstow. As an adolescent, he had shown form and had played for Wales Youth, but before he could start a second season with Newport was called up for National Service. In the Army he joined the South Wales Borderers and represented The Army rugby team. On his return to civilian life he rejoined Newport who he would play for until 1965. He captained Newport during the 1962–63 season. While at Newport he would play in the teams that faced all three great Southern Hemisphere sides, New Zealand, Australia and South Africa. He was on the winning side against Australia (1957) and New Zealand (1963), but Newport were narrowly defeated 3–0 by the 1961 touring South Africans. Although losing the game, Davidge was considered to have been the most outstanding forward on the field that day. Davidge controlled the Springbok's attack and tackled heavily at every opportunity. Davidge was also a keen player of rugby sevens and was part of the Newport team that won the Snelling Sevens on three occasions between 1961 and 1963.

== International career ==
Davidge was selected to represent Wales on 4 April 1959 against France at Stade Colombes. He would play for Wales nine time in total including the South Africans who he would later play so well against for Newport.

Davidge was selected to play in the 1962 British Lions tour to South Africa, but was injured after playing three games against club opposition.

=== International matches played ===
Wales

- England 1961
- France 1959, 1960, 1962
- Ireland 1960, 1961
- Scotland 1960, 1961
- South Africa 1960

== Bibliography ==
- Smith, David; Williams, Gareth (1980). Fields of Praise: The Official History of The Welsh Rugby Union. Cardiff: University of Wales Press. ISBN 0-7083-0766-3.
