= Caldicot RFC =

Welsh rugby union club

(Wales) Caldicot RFC
- Full name: Caldicot Rugby Football Club
- Nickname: Caldi
- Founded: 1961
- Location: Caldicot, Monmouthshire
- Ground: Longfellow Road (Capacity: 1000)
- Chairman: Keith Mellons
- Coach: Mike English
- Captain: Matt Hereford / Ben Snell
- League: WRU Men’s National League
- 2025/26: 5th

Official website
- caldicot.rfc.wales

Caldicot Rugby Football Club are a Welsh rugby union club based in Caldicot, Monmouthshire, between Chepstow and the city of Newport in South Wales. The club was founded in 1961 and they play just off Longfellow Road, Caldicot. The 1st XV currently play in the Welsh Rugby Union Division Two East and are a feeder club for the Dragons Rugby.

In the 2014/15 season after a WRU restructure of the league's in Wales, Caldicot finished 5th in the league, only 10 points short of promotion to Division 2 East.

The 2nd XV currently play in the Newport and Pontypool District League and are known affectionately by locals as "the Geese". It is widely believed by locals that the Geese have the ability to grow webbing between their fingers during matches when large downpours of rain occur and are able to communicate with each other in the native geese tongue of "honking".

The Youth team currently play in the Dragons Regional Youth Leagues. The 2024/25 season was highly successful with a double winning season, winning the Dragons Cup and East Wales Premiership.

They also run a Veterans XV that play occasional friendlies. They also have a thriving mini and junior section running teams from Under 8s-Under 16s with around 250 children playing on Sundays. The club colours are black and white. The club logo is a swan like most clubs and societies in Caldicot.

== Club Honours ==
2010/2011

1st XV

WRU Division Five East Champions

Youth

RAF Dragons Youth League Division DD Champions

Gwent District Youth Cup Champions

Dragons Youth Green League

Dragons Youth Cup

East Wales Youth Premiership
