= Chepstow RFC =

Welsh rugby union team

(Wales) Chepstow RFC
- Full name: Chepstow Rugby Football Club
- Nickname: The Stow
- Founded: 1869
- Location: Chepstow, Wales
- Ground: Upton Memorial Ground (Capacity: Plenty)
- Captain: Rhys Cresswell
- League: WRU Admiral National League 3 East
- 2022-23: 1st
1st kit	2nd kit

Official website
- chepstow.rfc.wales

Chepstow Rugby Football Club is a rugby union team from the town of Chepstow, in Monmouthshire, Wales. The club is a member of the Welsh Rugby Union and is a feeder club for the Dragons RFC with a Mini age groups from under 6's to under 16's.

== History ==
Chepstow Rugby club was formed in 1869 by former pupils of Chepstow Grammar School under the mentorship of headmaster George Dewdney. In 1879 the Chepstow Weekly Advertiser appealed to local gentlemen to patronise the newly formed club in an attempt to gain sponsorship to allow the club to remain financially stable.

In 1880 Chepstow RFC were thought to be one of the clubs at the Tenby Hotel in Swansea which is incorrectly believed to have been the founding meeting of the Welsh Rugby Union. The accepted founding actually took place in Neath in 1881, at which Chepstow RFC were not in attendance. In 1881 Chepstow player Edward Peake was selected to represent the very first Welsh rugby international, played against England.

In 1969 a match was held between Chepstow and a Welsh XV that included many famous players such as Brian Price. The match was supposedly held to commemorate the founding of what at the time was claimed to be the oldest rugby club in Wales. Chepstow lost by a large margin.

Celebrated their 150 year in 2019 150th year Chepstow RFC

== Club honours ==
1994-95 Welsh League Division 8A East - Champions

2022-23 WRU Admiral National League 4 East - Champions

== Notable former players ==
- (Wales) Lyndon Mustoe
- (Wales) Edward Peake
- (Wales) Cliff Ashton
- (Wales) Glyn Davidge

Cliff Ashton who was capped seven times for Wales in the period 1959 to 1962 played for Chepstow during most of the 1960s and was for many years captain of Chepstow RFC.

Glyn Davidge who was capped nine times for Wales and was the hero of the defeat of the All Blacks by Newport played for Chepstow for a number of years in the early 1960s

== Bibliography ==
- Smith, David; Williams, Gareth (1980). Fields of Praise: The Official History of The Welsh Rugby Union. Cardiff: University of Wales Press. ISBN 0-7083-0766-3.
