= Brynithel RFC =

(Wales) Brynithel RFC
- Full name: Brynithel Rugby Football Club
- Nickname: The Owls 🦉
- Founded: 1974
- Location: Brynithel, Wales
- Ground: Brynithel Recreation Ground
- President: Roy Cropper
- League: WRU Division Five East
- 2008-09: 3rd
Team kit

Brynithel RFC is a rugby union club representing the village of Brynithel in Wales. Brynithel RFC is a member of the Welsh Rugby Union and is a feeder club for the Newport Gwent Dragons.

== Club history ==
The club was formed on 1 December 1974 at the Mount Pleasant Inn, Brynithel, after a meeting of local men who were at the time playing for teams from the Mount Pleasant Inn and T9 face at Six Bells colliery. They played six matches at the end of the 1974/75 season captained by Robert Williams. The first official game was against Bargoed 2nd XV in which Brynithel opened the scoring but ended up being beaten by 50-5.

The first full season for Brynithel was 1975/76 with 3 wins and 29 losses. However the club continued to prosper and its first taste of success came as they finished as runners up in the old second division of the Gwent Districts and qualified for a playoff against Hollybush RFC. The game was played in atrocious conditions with Hollybush winning by scoring the only try of the game in the second period of extra time. Brynithel again reached this final in 1984, this time hosting the game against Cwm RFC and winning it by 19 pts to 0.

Over the ensuing years Brynithel had their problems as did other clubs but were able to provide some shocks in the Cyrus Davies Cup against some very good sides, notably against RTB Ebbw Vale, shortly before they gained Welsh Rugby Union status. In 1992 Brynithel reached their first Cyrus Davies Cup final losing in the final to Holybush RFC. The following year Brynithel got their revenge, winning the cup through tries by Dean Slimmon and Lee Howells. Michael Hurn was voted Man of the Match. Brynithel failed to reach the final in 1994 losing at the semi-final stage. However, that was the last game they lost in this competition being champions for the next four years before becoming members of the WRU in 1998. Brynithel were put into Division 7, however, in the ensuing period, they have made steady progress and won promotion to Division 2 East in 2004/2005 under skipper Gareth John Davies of Treowen.

During their time in the Districts, several players gained international honours for the Welsh Districts XV; Carl Mogford, Eugene Glastonbury, Mike Hurn, Mike Peck, Ashley Perry & finally Ieuan Brooks who became one of the youngest players capped at this level. Ashley Perry became the most capped at this level.

== Club honours ==
- 2003-04 WRU Division Three East Champions.
