= Machen RFC =

Welsh rugby union club, based in Machen

(Wales) Machen RFC
- Full name: Machen Rugby Football Club
- Nickname: The Quarry Men
- Founded: 1871; 155 years ago
- Location: Machen, Wales
- Ground: The Welfare Ground (Capacity: 4,000 All Standing)
- Chairman: Paul Crowley
- League: League 3 East A
- 2017-8: 7th
Team kit

Official website
- machen.rfc.wales

Machen Rugby Football Club is a Welsh rugby union club based in Machen, near the city of Newport. Machen RFC is a member of the Welsh Rugby Union and is a feeder club for the Dragons.

Rugby football was played in Machen from the early 1870s, but Machen RFC can be placed as playing as a club from the early 1880s. One of the club's earliest and most notable players was Frank Purdon, who would later go on to play from Newport and Wales.

The club also has two notable local rivalries with Risca and Bedwas.

== Former notable players ==
- (Wales) Bill Everson
- (Wales) Frank Purdon (4 caps)
- (Wales) Mel Rosser
