= Trinant RFC =

Rugby union team in Wales

(Wales) Trinant RFC
- Full name: Trinant Rugby Football Club
- Founded: 1956
- Location: Trinant, Wales
- Chairman: Lyndon Lloyd
- Coach: Jonathan Way
- League: WRU Division Five East
- 2009-10: 11th
1st kit	2nd kit

Official website
- www.trinantrfc.co.uk

Trinant Rugby Football Club is a rugby union team from the village of Trinant in Newport, Wales. The club is a member of the Welsh Rugby Union and is a feeder club for the Newport Gwent Dragons.

Rugby had been played in Trinant before 1956, but proof of the existence of Trinant RFC can not be substantiated before this date. The club was founded by Albert Clement, who had played rugby in the town in the 1940s, and Ray Morgan, who became secretary. As the club was at this point not affiliated to any union, they had to write to other teams to arrange friendly matches, and out of 75 teams contacted 31 accepted the invitation. The first club to play against the newly formed Trinant RFC was Hafodorynys. Team colours were decided and the club chose black with white hoops.

When news that Trinant had reformed began to travel, many local players from rival clubs, requested to move to Trinant. This resulted in a bitter complaint from the secretary of Oakdale when eight of their players switched clubs.

== Club badge ==
The Trinant badge consists of a shield split into quarters. The quarters hold:

- The Monmouthshire portcullis with three brooks flowing through it.
- The black and white stripes of the club's home colours.
- The Prince of Wales's feathers.
- The green and black stripes of the club's second colours.
