= Talywain RFC =

Welsh rugby union club, based in Talywain

(Wales) Talywain RFC
- Full name: Talywain Rugby Football Club
- Nickname: The Snakes
- Founded: c.1898; 128 years ago
- Location: Talywain, Wales
- Ground: Emlyn Park
- Chairman: Jeff Clutterbuck
- President: David Lloyd Jones
- Coach(es): Head Coach; Darren Davies
- League: WRU Championship East
Team kit

Official website
- aberdare.rfc.wales

Talywain Rugby Football Club are a Welsh rugby union club based in Talywain near the town of Pontypool, Wales. The club is a member of the Welsh Rugby Union and is a feeder club for the Newport Gwent Dragons.

In December 1947 a combined Pontypool, Talywain and Blaenavon side played against the Australian national team at Pontypool Park as part of a post-war rebuilding tour. The game ended 9–7 to the tourists. On 4 September 1973 Talywain played an invitational Monmouth team to celebrate the club's 75th anniversary and the opening of a new ground at Emlyn Park.

Although Talywain RFC played out almost all matches for the 2007–08 season in Division Four East they withdrew from the league before the end of the season. All games played against Talywain by the other teams in the league were classed as null and void and Talywain were relegated to Division Five East.

== Players of note ==
See also Category:Talywain RFC players

- (Wales) Wilfred "Wilf" Hodder
- (Wales) Danny Hurcombe
- (Wales) Harry Jarman
- (Wales) Kenneth 'Ken' Jeffrey Jones
- (Wales) Rees Thomas
- (Wales) George Oliver
