= Blaenavon RFC =

Welsh rugby union club, based in Blaenavon

(Wales) Blaenavon RFC
- Full name: Blaenavon Rugby Football Community Club
- Founded: 1877; 148 years ago
- Location: Blaenavon
- Ground: Recreation Ground (Capacity: 500)
- Chairman: Paul William Tanner
- Coach(es): Gareth Groves and Jordan Williams
- League: WRU Division One East
Team kit

Blaenavon Rugby Football Club are a Welsh rugby union club based in the town of Blaenavon, South Wales. Blaenavon RFC is one of the older members of the Welsh Rugby Union founded in 1877 in the Iron and coal town of Blaenavon and is a feeder club for the Newport Gwent Dragons.

Blaenavon RFC first game was against local rivals Abergavenny on Thursday, November 8, 1877, and ended in a draw. An infamous event in the history of Blaenavon RFC, was during the final of the Godfrey Jones Cup in April 1926. The competition had been devised 'to improve Welsh rugby via the running game'.

In December 1947 a combined Pontypool, Talywain and Blaenavon side played against the Australian national team at Pontypool Park as part of a post-war rebuilding tour. The game ended with Australia winning 9–7. A photo and a programme are displayed in Blaenavon R.F.C. club house Blaenavon Rugby Football Club was founded in 1877, and over the past 130 years, we have provided, many players for the W.R.U. and Premier divisions.

1962 - 1963 Season. Blaenavon RFC become Ben Francis Cup Winners against Talywain. The First team now play in the W.R.U. League Division 1 East after gaining promotion in the 2013/14 season, and winning the Ben Francis cup for the second time in 2015 season beating Risca RFC in the final at Blackwood. They currently play in WRU Division one East

== Notable former players ==
- Reg Skrimshire 1899 Wales (3 caps) and British Lions.
- Cecil Pritchard 1928-1929 Wales (4 caps)
- Bert Day 1930-1931 Wales (5 caps)
- Ken Jones - 1947-1957 Wales (45 caps) British Lions, Barbarians, Newport and Empire Games medalist.
- Allan Lewis - 1966-1967 Wales (6 caps) and British Lions, Abertillery.
- Allen Forward - Wales and Pontypool
- Fenton Coles - 1960 Wales (3 caps) & Pontypool
- Colin Evans - 1960 Wales (rugby union) (1 cap), 1963-1969 Wales (rugby league) (2 caps)
- Terry Cobner - Wales, British Lions, Barbarians and Pontypool.
- John Perkins - Wales and Pontypool.
- Laurie Daniel - 1970 Wales (1 cap)
- Mark Taylor - Wales, Barbarians and Swansea. Mark scored the first international try at the Millennium Stadium against South Africa.
- Chris Huish - Wales B, Barbarians and Pontypool.

Blaenavon RFC have also provided many player over the years, that have gone on to play for Newport RFC without obtaining international status:

- Ivor Taylor - Played in the side that beat Australia in 1966
- Keith Poole - Played in the team that beat the All Blacks in 1963, and went on to play in the winning Newport RFC sides against Australia and South Africa and were never on a losing side playing against the Southern Hemisphere tourists.
- Tommy Deans played for Cardiff RFC and Glamorgan County
- F Dibble - Somerset 1909
- R Dibble - Somerset 1910
- Noel Williams - Played for Pontypool RFc & Cardiff RFC
- Numerous players went on to play for Monmouthshire County and Monmouthshire Union teams.

In 1960 Blaenavon R.F.C. had provided all three scrum halves for the three Welsh teams that year

Colin Evans - Wales Senior Cap Allen Lewis - Wales Youth Cap Owen Freeman - Wales Schoolboy Cap

They were all three international scrum halves that year and had all played for Blaenavon R.F.C. at scrum half.
