= Oakdale RFC =

(Wales) Oakdale RFC
- Full name: Oakdale Rugby Football Club
- Nickname(s): The Dale
- Location: Oakdale
- Ground(s): Recreation Ground
- Chairman: Chris Thomas
- Coach(es): Kris Moses; Martin Jones
- Captain(s): Scott Hoskins
- League(s): WRU Division 2 East
- 2018-19: 1st
Team kit

Official website
- oakdale.rfc.wales

Oakdale Rugby Football Club is a rugby union team from the village of Oakdale near Blackwood in Wales. The club is a member of the Welsh Rugby Union, and is a feeder club for the Newport Gwent Dragons.

== Club honours ==
- WRU Division Five East 2009/10 - Champions
- WRU Bowl 2018-19 - Runners-Up
