= WRU Division Three East =

Rugby union league in Wales

- Founded: 1995
- No. of teams: 12
- Country: Wales
- Most recent champion: Garndiffaith RFC (2011–12)
- Level on pyramid: 4
- Promotion to: WRU Division Two East
- Relegation to: WRU Division Four East
- Website: www.wru.co.uk/1149_2152.php/WRU

The Welsh Rugby Union Division Three East (also called the SWALEC Division Three East for sponsorship reasons) is a rugby union league in Wales.

== Competition format and sponsorship ==
=== Competition ===
There are 12 clubs in the WRU Division Three East. During the course of a season (which lasts from September to May) each club plays the others twice, once at their home ground and once at that of their opponents for a total of 22 games for each club, with a total of 132 games in each season. Teams receive four points for a win and two point for a draw, an additional bonus point is awarded to either team if they score four tries or more in a single match. No points are awarded for a loss though the losing team can gain a bonus point for finishing the match within seven points of the winning team. Teams are ranked by total points, then the number of tries scored and then points difference. At the end of each season, the club with the most points is crowned as champion. If points are equal the tries scored then points difference determines the winner. The team who is declared champion at the end of the season is eligible for promotion to the WRU Division Two East. The two lowest placed teams are relegated into the WRU Division Four East.

=== Sponsorship ===
In 2008 the Welsh Rugby Union announced a new sponsorship deal for the club rugby leagues with SWALEC valued at £1 million (GBP). The initial three year sponsorship was extended at the end of the 2010/11 season, making SWALEC the league sponsors until 2015. The leagues sponsored are the WRU Divisions one through to seven.

- (2002-2005) Lloyds TSB
- (2005-2008) Asda
- (2008-2015) SWALEC

== 2011/2012 season ==
=== League teams ===
- Abergavenny RFC
- Abertillery RFC
- Brynmawr RFC
- Caerphilly RFC
- Croesyceiliog RFC
- Garndiffaith RFC
- Newport HSOB RFC
- Pill Harriers RFC
- Pontypool United RFC
- Risca RFC
- Senghenydd RFC
- Tredegar Ironsides RFC

=== 2011/2012 Table ===
2010-2011 WRU Division Three East League Table
	Club	Played	Won	Drawn	Lost	Points for	Points against	Tries for	Tries against	Try bonus	Losing bonus	Points
1	Garndiffaith RFC	22	19	0	3	679	285	95	31	12	1	89
2	Pill Harriers RFC	22	17	1	4	581	281	83	33	11	3	84
3	Senghenydd RFC	22	16	0	6	670	342	91	43	12	4	80
4	Pontypool United RFC	22	15	0	7	542	313	68	38	9	4	73
5	Abertillery RFC	22	12	1	9	457	485	59	61	7	2	59
6	Risca RFC	22	10	4	8	470	499	68	69	6	1	55
7	Abergavenny RFC	22	10	1	11	490	383	72	48	8	4	54
8	Newport HSOB RFC	22	10	1	11	414	359	53	42	5	5	52
9	Brynmawr RFC	22	6	1	15	306	519	30	71	2	2	30
10	Croesyceiliog RFC	22	6	0	16	306	572	27	82	0	3	27
11	Caerphilly RFC	22	5	1	16	217	556	25	78	2	2	26
12	Tredegar Ironsides RFC	22	1	0	21	275	813	39	114	3	3	10
Correct as of 27 May 2012												

== 2010/2011 season ==
=== League teams ===
- Abergavenny RFC
- Abertillery RFC
- Blaina RFC
- Croesyceiliog RFC
- Garndiffaith RFC
- Newport HSOB RFC
- Newport Saracens RFC
- Pill Harriers RFC
- Pontypool United RFC
- Rhymney RFC
- Risca RFC
- Tredegar Ironsides RFC

=== 2010/2011 Table ===
2010-2011 WRU Division Three East League Table
	Club	Played	Won	Drawn	Lost	Points for	Points against	Tries for	Tries against	Try bonus	Losing bonus	Points
1	Rhymney RFC	20	18	0	2	553	261	79	30	140	86	
2	Garndiffaith RFC	20	17	1	2	864	299	119	36	141	85	
3	Pill Harriers RFC	20	16	1	3	705	309	98	34	122	80	
4	Pontypool United RFC	20	13	0	7	542	308	72	38	105	67	
5	Newport HSOB RFC	20	12	0	8	538	436	72	62	91	58	
6	Risca RFC	20	9	0	11	524	488	66	62	74	47	
7	Tredegar Ironsides RFC	20	8	0	12	310	499	43	71	22	36	
8	Abergavenny RFC	20	6	0	14	385	497	54	67	53	32	
9	Abertillery RFC	20	5	0	15	287	588	37	78	13	24	
10	Croesyceiliog RFC	20	4	0	16	326	653	37	92	13	20	
11	Blaina RFC	20	1	0	19	234	930	26	133	03	7	
12	Newport Saracens RFC	0	0	0	0	0	0	0	0	00	0	
Correct as of 27 May 2012												

== 2009/2010 season ==
=== League teams ===
- Abergavenny RFC
- Blaina RFC
- Croesyceiliog RFC
- Cwmbran RFC
- Fleur De Lys RFC
- Gwernyfed RFC
- Nelson RFC
- Newport HSOB RFC
- Pill Harriers RFC
- Pontypool United RFC
- Rhymney RFC
- Tredegar Ironsides RFC

=== 2009/2010 Table ===
2009-2010 WRU Division Three East League Table
Club	Played	Won	Drawn	Lost	Points for	Points against	Tries for	Tries against	Try bonus	Losing bonus	Points
Fleur De Lys RFC	22	21	0	1	618	335	70	45	9	0	93
Abergavenny RFC	22	18	0	4	611	318	89	40	12	4	88
Rhymney RFC	22	13	0	9	452	406	55	50	5	4	61
Pill Harriers RFC	22	12	1	9	590	442	79	58	8	3	61
Croesyceiliog RFC	22	11	1	10	423	497	51	67	4	3	53
Tredegar Ironsides RFC	22	10	0	12	382	399	46	45	5	5	50
Newport HSOB RFC	22	9	0	13	418	529	53	65	7	2	45
Pontypool United RFC	22	7	3	12	442	498	54	61	4	6	44
Gwernyfed RFC	22	9	0	13	338	386	41	46	2	5	43
Blaina RFC	22	8	1	13	383	452	39	56	1	7	42
Nelson RFC	22	8	0	14	383	478	49	54	2	4	38
Cwmbran RFC	22	2	2	18	286	586	38	77	1	5	18
Correct as of 3 August 2010											

== 2008/2009 season ==
=== League teams ===
- Abertillery RFC
- Blaina RFC
- Croesyceiliog RFC
- Cwmbran RFC
- Garndiffaith RFC
- Gwernyfed RFC
- Nelson RFC
- New Tredegar RFC
- Newport HSOB RFC
- Pill Harriers RFC
- Pontypool United RFC
- Rhymney RFC

=== 2008/2009 Table ===
2008-2009 WRU Division Three East League Table
Club	Played	Won	Drawn	Lost	Points for	Points against	Tries for	Tries against	Try bonus	Losing bonus	Points
Garndiffaith RFC	22	18	1	3	611	321	86	42	13	1	88
Pill Harriers RFC	22	16	0	6	561	341	84	41	13	3	80
Pontypool United RFC	22	12	2	8	411	280	51	31	5	4	61
Croesyceiliog RFC	22	12	1	9	381	315	53	38	4	4	58
Rhymney RFC	22	11	1	10	487	368	68	44	7	4	57
Nelson RFC	22	11	1	10	406	335	48	42	5	6	57
Blaina RFC	22	12	0	10	376	417	40	51	2	1	51
Newport HSOB RFC	22	9	0	13	298	503	37	70	2	3	41
Gwernyfed RFC	22	8	1	13	367	438	44	55	4	3	41
Cwmbran RFC	22	9	0	13	265	412	29	55	0	3	39
Abertillery RFC	22	8	1	13	290	420	33	54	1	3	38
New Tredegar RFC	22	1	2	19	275	578	33	83	2	6	16
Correct as of 2 June 2009											

== 2007/2008 season ==
=== League teams ===
- Abergavenny RFC
- Blaina RFC
- Brynmawr RFC
- Croesyceiliog RFC
- Cwmbran RFC
- Garndiffaith RFC
- Nelson RFC
- New Tredegar RFC
- Pontllanfraith RFC
- Pontypool United RFC
- Rhymney RFC
- Senghenydd RFC

=== 2007/2008 Table ===
2007-2008 WRU Division Three East League Table
Club	Played	Won	Drawn	Lost	Points for	Points against	Tries for	Tries against	Try bonus	Losing bonus	Points
Brynmawr RFC	22	21	0	1	650	167	90	21	12	1	97
Abergavenny RFC	22	19	0	3	678	255	100	31	11	1	88
Garndiffaith RFC	22	15	0	7	571	470	82	60	10	2	72
Croesyceiliog RFC	22	13	1	8	515	322	76	45	10	3	67
Blaina RFC	22	12	1	9	450	363	66	44	6	4	60
Pontypool United RFC	22	11	0	11	500	334	60	41	6	5	55
Cwmbran RFC	22	10	1	11	369	344	45	45	3	4	49
Rhymney RFC	22	9	1	12	409	450	52	63	7	3	48
Nelson RFC	22	7	0	15	416	437	59	54	3	5	36
New Tredegar RFC	22	6	0	16	342	542	50	77	5	3	32
Senghenydd RFC	22	3	1	18	293	749	35	114	1	2	17
Pontllanfraith RFC	22	3	1	18	163	923	19	139	0	2	16
Correct as of 00:00 27 May 2008											

== 2006/2007 season ==
=== League teams ===
- Abergavenny RFC
- Blaina RFC
- Brynmawr RFC
- Cwmbran RFC
- Nelson RFC
- New Tredegar RFC
- Newport High School Old Boys RFC
- Penallta RFC
- Pontllanfraith RFC
- Pontypool United RFC
- Rhymney RFC
- Senghenydd RFC

=== 2006/2007 Table ===
2006-07 WRU Division Three League East Table
Club	Played	Won	Drawn	Lost	Points for	Points against	TF	Points
Penallta RFC	22	19	1	2	948	200	127	58
Newport High School Old Boys RFC	22	16	1	5	636	367	95	49
Cwmbran RFC	22	15	0	7	564	301	78	45
Pontypool United RFC	22	13	2	7	406	309	41	41
Brynmawr RFC	22	12	0	10	445	396	65	36
Blaina RFC	22	11	2	9	514	367	71	35
Rhymney RFC	22	10	1	11	397	393	51	31
New Tredegar RFC	22	9	1	12	434	573	62	28
Senghenydd RFC	22	7	2	13	397	780	53	23
Pontllanfraith RFC	22	7	0	15	329	508	46	21
Brynithel RFC	22	5	3	14	262	396	32	18
Abercarn RFC	22	1	1	20	161	903	20	4
Correct as of 2007-08-15
