= Garndiffaith RFC =

Welsh rugby union club, based in Garndiffaith

(Wales) Garndiffaith RFC
- Full name: Garndiffaith Rugby Football Club
- Nickname: Garn
- Founded: 1922
- Location: Garndiffaith, Wales
- Ground: Lasgarn View
- Chairman: Unknown
- President: A. Trott
- Coach: L. Clark
- Captain: L. Jones
- League: WRU Division Three East
- 2025/26: 1stWRU Division Three East
Team kit

Official website
- www.geocities.com/garno6rugby/

Garndiffaith Rugby Football Club are a Welsh rugby union club based in Garndiffaith in South Wales. The club is a member of the Welsh Rugby Union and is a feeder club for the Dragons RFC (rugby union).

The first games played by Garndiffaith RFC took place in 1922 against local sides such as Caerleon College and Pontypool Quins. The club disbanded after the outbreak of World War II, and reformed on 28 June 1946.

== Early history ==
Garndiffaith Rugby Club (known to locals as Garn) consisted of prominent ex-schoolboys who served as a nursery side for many of the senior clubs. The boys changed and bathed at the Band Club (now the Garndiffaith Workingmen's Club). Washing in half barrel's, with hot water carried from a house opposite the club. Mr Josh Bannions trained the side and they played their rugby on a field which now houses Rock Villa Close.

The first Garndiffaith Rugby side was formed in 1922 and their fixtures then consisted of sides like Caerleon College, Llanhilleth All Blacks and Pontypool Quins (who later became Pontypool United RFC) . All were respected sides in the Monmouthshire area and during these early years the Garn side were winning more games than they were losing. Gardiffaith's home record occurred in the mid-1920s to the mid-1930s when the club went without being defeated at home for nine seasons. That level of performance attracted a large following of supporters but the record finally broke when Pontypool Quins visited the Garn and won by 3 points to nil.

The level of Garndiffaith's play during this period attracted other clubs of senior level, who came to watch them play, which resulted in them becoming a nursery side for other clubs. On one occasion Pontypool RFC committee watched the senior team play and within two weeks the whole of the back division turned out for Pontypool.

Garndiffaith's top players include Billy Werret, who for five years was reserve inside half to Wick Powell of London Welsh and who went on to Captain Pontypool and Arthur Fynn went on to play at Pontypool and gain a Monmouthshire cap.

== Post war history ==
Garndiffaith had to disband during the Second World War. When the war was over there was a local meeting to reform the team, and at a meeting on 28 June 1946 the club was recreated.

Players paid one shilling to join and threepence contributions each week. Their ground was Pen-y-lan fields and the committee held their meetings at the Rose & Crown public house which became their headquarters. Their first game was against Talywain on 1 September 1946. The result was Garndiffaith 5 Talywain 3.

== International and first class players ==
Several players have started with Garndiffaith and have gone on to win international caps. One such player was W. A. Williams who played outside half. He went on to Pontypool where he picked up an injury, when fit again he was left out of the side to face Neath. He then moved to Talywain before moving on to Newport, where he gained three Welsh caps in 1952/53. When his career finished his time with Newport he came back to play for the Garndiffaith at the age of 44.

Wilf Parfitt played wing forward for the Garndiffaith and went on to captain Pontypool against the Springboks in 1951. The second Welsh international to join Garndiffaith in the early 1950s was Graham Jones. He went from the Garn to Ebbw Vale, where he won three caps. He returned to coach Gardiffaith and made them stronger in both fitness and ability.

Other players from the Garn to go to first class clubs include, Arthur Fynn who went to Pontypool and Willy Beal who joined Tredegar.

Brian Cordy, played his first game in 1953 when just 17 years of age. He captained the side in the 1964/65 season. He also played for Pontypool before returning to Garndiffaith as coach in 1969/70 where he coached the side for ten years. During which time they won the Monmouthshire Union League twice and were runners up twice. The club also won the Ben Francis Cup and came runners up during that period. Cordy went to senior coach and alongside his role at the Garn he helped coach the Monmouthshire Union and Monmouthshire County Sides. In 1979/80 he left the Garn to take up coaching duties at Abertillery, who were then a first class club. Cordy is a Life Member of the club.

== Club honours ==
- 2006/07 WRU Division Four East - Champions
- 2008/09 WRU Division Three East - Champions
- 2011/12 WRU Division Three East - Champions

== Notable former players ==
- (Wales) W.A. Williams (3 caps, 1953/54)
- (Wales) Graham Jones (3 caps, 1963)

Current Squad

forwards
R. Jenkins - Hooker/Back Row
A. Lomas - Hooker/Back Row
A. Bayliss - Prop
A. Davies - Prop/Hooker
A. Jenkins - Prop/Centre
K. Saunders - Prop
I. Beale - Lock/Back Row
S. Bradbury - Lock
L. Jefford - Lock/Back Row (C)
W. Waters - Lock
G. Rosser - Back Row/Lock
D. Carter - Back Row/Lock
C. Clark - Back Row
J. James - Back Row/Hooker
J. Sinnett - Back Row
A. Robinson - Back Row
Backs
C. Fry - Srum Half
C. Harris - Centre/Wing
J. Davies - Centre
D. Davies - Centre/Fullback
C. Jones - Centre
L. Davies - Wing/Centre
T. Hood - Wing
SL. Jones - Wing/Fullback
L. Jones - Utility Back
A. Farmer - Utility Back
