= 1998 Wales rugby union tour of Africa =

- Coach: Dennis John
- Tour captain: Rob Howley
Summary
P	W	D	L
Total
6	1	0	5
Test match
2	1	0	1
Opponent
P	W	D	L
Zimbabwe
1	1	0	0
South Africa
1	0	0	1

Tour chronology
- ← 1997 North America 1999 Argentina →

The Wales national rugby union team toured southern Africa in June 1998, playing test matches against Zimbabwe and South Africa, as well as tour matches against the Emerging Springboks and three of the South African provincial sides.

Wales head coach Kevin Bowring had resigned at the end of the 1998 Five Nations Championship, and with a replacement yet to be appointed, Dennis John was made caretaker coach ahead of the tour. Prior to the tour, 18 players from Wales made themselves unavailable to participate, while a further 8 picked up injuries during the tour.

Wales won their initial match against Zimbabwe in Harare, before moving on to the second leg of the tour in South Africa. Here they would play four tour matches against representative and provincial opposition and a test match against the Springboks. Wales lost all four of the tour matches, and then were defeated by South Africa in the test match. The final scoreline of 96–13 was the biggest defeat Wales had ever had, and remains so as of 2024.

== Squad ==
Pending the appointment of a replacement for coach Kevin Bowring, who resigned after the 1998 Five Nations Championship, Wales named Pontypridd's Dennis John as their interim coach for the tour of southern Africa. With 16 regular squad members unavailable due to injury, among them fly-half Neil Jenkins and centre Scott Gibbs, they named a 30-man squad that included 10 uncapped players. A further seven players were injured during the tour, including captain Rob Howley; called up in their place were the likes of Ebbw Vale back rower Kingsley Jones – in what would turn out to be his final Wales call-up – and uncapped Llanelli fly-half Stephen Jones.

Name	Position	Club	Notes
Garin Jenkins	Hooker	Swansea	
Barry Williams	Hooker	Richmond	
John Davies	Prop	Richmond	
Ben Evans	Prop	Neath	
Mike Griffiths	Prop	Pontypridd	
Darren Morris	Prop	Neath	
Paul Arnold	Lock	Swansea	
Ian Gough	Lock	Newport	
Andy Moore	Lock	Swansea	
Chris Stephens	Lock	Bridgend	Injury replacement for Mark Jones
Chris Wyatt	Lock	Llanelli	
Rob Appleyard	Back row	Swansea	Withdrew due to injury
Colin Charvis	Back row	Swansea	
Kingsley Jones	Back row	Ebbw Vale	Injury replacement for Rob Appleyard
Mark Jones	Back row	Ebbw Vale	Withdrew due to injury
Geraint Lewis	Back row	Pontypridd	Injury replacement for Scott Quinnell
Scott Quinnell	Back row	Richmond	Withdrew due to injury
Dean Thomas	Back row	Swansea	Injury replacement for Martyn Williams
Nathan Thomas	Back row	Bath	
Martyn Williams	Back row	Pontypridd	Withdrew due to injury
Rob Howley	Scrum-half	Cardiff	Captain
Paul John	Scrum-half	Pontypridd	
David Llewellyn	Scrum-half	Ebbw Vale	Injury cover for Rob Howley
Stephen Jones	Fly-half	Llanelli	Injury replacement for Wayne Proctor
Byron Hayward	Fly-half	Ebbw Vale	
Arwel Thomas	Fly-half	Swansea	
Leigh Davies	Centre	Cardiff	
Geraint Evans	Centre	Neath	Injury replacement for David Weatherley
John Funnell	Centre	Ebbw Vale	
Mark Taylor	Centre	Swansea	
Garan Evans	Wing	Llanelli	
Dafydd James	Wing	Pontypridd	
Wayne Proctor	Wing	Llanelli	Withdrew due to injury
Richard Rees	Wing	Swansea	
Lenny Woodard	Wing	Ebbw Vale	
David Weatherley	Full-back	Swansea	Withdrew due to injury
Darril Williams	Full-back	Llanelli	

== Matches ==
Date	Venue	Home	Score	Away	Source
6 June 1998	National Sports Stadium, Harare	Zimbabwe	11–49	Wales	
12 June 1998	Secunda Stadium, Secunda	Emerging Springboks	35–13	Wales XV	
16 June 1998	Basil Kenyon Stadium, East London	Border Bulldogs	24–8	Wales XV	
19 June 1998	Kings Park Stadium, Durban	Natal Sharks	30–23	Wales XV	
23 June 1998	Isak Steyl Stadium, Vanderbijlpark	Gauteng Falcons	39–37	Wales XV	
27 June 1998	Loftus Versfeld Stadium, Pretoria	South Africa	96–13	Wales	

=== Zimbabwe vs Wales ===
6 June 1998

Zimbabwe	11–49	Wales
Try: Bekker; Pen: Tsimba (2)	Report	Try: Hayward (3); Rees (2); A. Thomas (2); Proctor; Con: A. Thomas (3); Pen: A. Thomas

National Sports Stadium, Harare
Attendance: 6,000
Referee: Johnnie Meuwesen (Namibia)

FB	15	Victor Olonga
RW	14	G. Campbell
OC	13	John Ewing
IC	12	Brendan French
LW	11	R. Karimazondo	(substituted off) 49'
FH	10	Kennedy Tsimba	(substituted off) 60'
SH	9	Ryan Bekker	(substituted off) 70'
N8	8	Brendon Dawson (c)
OF	7	Mordekai Mwerenga	(substituted off) 30'
BF	6	Leon Greeff
RL	5	Shaun Landman
LL	4	Brenton Catterall
TP	3	Graham Stewart
HK	2	Wayne Barratt	(substituted off) 72'
LP	1	Gary Snyder
Replacements:
FL		C. McNab	(substituted on) 30'
WG		Dave Walters	(substituted on) 49'
FB		Doug Trivella	(substituted on) 60'
SH		Neill Nortje	(substituted on) 70'
HK		Ian Neilson	(substituted on) 72'
Coach:
(Zimbabwe) Alex Nicholls

FB	15	David Weatherley	(substituted off) 31'
RW	14	Richard Rees
OC	13	Mark Taylor	(substituted off) 27'
IC	12	Dafydd James
LW	11	Wayne Proctor
FH	10	Arwel Thomas
SH	9	Rob Howley (c)	(substituted off) 78'
N8	8	Scott Quinnell	(substituted off) 56'
OF	7	Martyn Williams
BF	6	Nathan Thomas
RL	5	Andy Moore
LL	4	Mark Jones	(substituted off) 71'
TP	3	John Davies
HK	2	Garin Jenkins	(substituted off) 56'
LP	1	Darren Morris
Replacements:
CE	16	John Funnell	(substituted on) 27'
FB	17	Byron Hayward	(substituted on) 31'
SH	18	Paul John	(substituted on) 78'
HK	19	Barry Williams	(substituted on) 56'
PR	20	Mike Griffiths
LK	21	Chris Wyatt	(substituted on) 71'
FL	22	Colin Charvis	(substituted on) 56'
Coach:
(Wales) Dennis John

=== Emerging Springboks vs Wales XV ===
12 June 1998

Emerging Springboks	35–13	Wales XV
Try: Daniels (3); Fleck; L. Venter; Con: Koen (2); Pen: Koen (2)		Try: James; Con: Hayward; Pen: Hayward (2)

Secunda Stadium, Secunda
Referee: Jonathan Kaplan (Natal)

=== Border Bulldogs vs Wales XV ===
16 June 1998

Border Bulldogs	24–8	Wales XV
Try: Heidtmann; Van der Walt; Con: Bradbrook; Pen: Bradbrook (4)		Try: Rees; Pen: A. Thomas

Basil Kenyon Stadium, East London
Referee: Tappe Henning (Northern Transvaal)

=== Natal Sharks vs Wales XV ===
19 June 1998

Natal Sharks	30–23	Wales XV
Try: Brink (3); Joubert; Con: Joubert (2); Pen: Joubert (2)		Try: A. Thomas; Hayward; Con: A. Thomas (2); Pen: A. Thomas (3)

Kings Park Stadium, Durban
Referee: André Watson (Eastern Transvaal)

=== Gauteng Falcons vs Wales XV ===
23 June 1998

Gauteng Falcons	39–37	Wales XV
Try: Geyer (2); Strydom; Lourens; Moyle; Booysen; Con: Van Straaten (2); Van As; Pen: Van Straaten		Try: Funnell; Arnold; Woodard; Taylor; Con: Hayward (4); Pen: Hayward (3)

Isak Steyl Stadium, Vanderbijlpark
Referee: Carl Spannenberg (Western Province)

=== South Africa vs Wales ===
27 June 1998

South Africa	96–13	Wales
Try: Rossouw (3); Montgomery (2); Terblanche (2); Venter (2); Van der Westhuizen; Otto; Smith; Erasmus; Skinstad; Hendricks; Con: Montgomery (9); Pen: Montgomery	Report	Try: A. Thomas; Con: A. Thomas; Pen: A. Thomas (2)

Loftus Versfeld Stadium, Pretoria
Attendance: 33,633
Referee: Paddy O'Brien (New Zealand)

FB	15	Percy Montgomery
RW	14	Stefan Terblanche	(substituted off) 47'
OC	13	André Snyman
IC	12	Pieter Muller	(substituted off) 40'
LW	11	Pieter Rossouw
FH	10	Franco Smith
SH	9	Joost van der Westhuizen	(substituted off) 45'
N8	8	André Venter
OF	7	Gary Teichmann (c)	(substituted off) 58'
BF	6	Rassie Erasmus
RL	5	Mark Andrews	(substituted off) 55'
LL	4	Krynauw Otto
TP	3	Adrian Garvey	(substituted off) 66'
HK	2	James Dalton	(substituted off) 60'
LP	1	Robbi Kempson
Replacements:
WG	16	McNeil Hendricks	(substituted on) 47'
CE	17	Henry Honiball	(substituted on) 40'
SH	18	Werner Swanepoel	(substituted on) 45'
N8	19	Andrew Aitken	(substituted on) 58'
FL	20	Bobby Skinstad	(substituted on) 55'
PR	21	Ollie le Roux	(substituted on) 66'
HK	22	Naka Drotské	(substituted on) 60'
Coach:
(South Africa) Nick Mallett

FB	15	Byron Hayward	(substituted off) 48'
RW	14	Dafydd James
OC	13	Mark Taylor
IC	12	John Funnell	(substituted off) 50'
LW	11	Garan Evans
FH	10	Arwel Thomas
SH	9	Paul John	(substituted off) 79'
N8	8	Kingsley Jones (c)	(substituted off) 40'
OF	7	Colin Charvis	(substituted off) 73'
BF	6	Nathan Thomas
RL	5	Andy Moore
LL	4	Ian Gough
TP	3	John Davies	(substituted off) 60'
HK	2	Barry Williams	(substituted off) 66'
LP	1	Mike Griffiths
Replacements:
FB	16	Darril Williams	(substituted on) 48'
FH	17	Stephen Jones	(substituted on) 50'
SH	18	David Llewellyn	(substituted on) 79'
FL	19	Geraint Lewis	(substituted on) 73'
LK	20	Chris Wyatt	(substituted on) 40'
PR	21	Darren Morris	(substituted on) 60'
HK	22	Garin Jenkins	(substituted on) 66'
Coach:
(Wales) Dennis John
