= Jamie Corsi =

Wales international rugby union player (born 1987)

- Born: Jamie Corsi; 30 December 1987 (age 38) Cardiff, Wales
- Height: 191 cm (6 ft 3 in)
- Weight: 110 kg (17 st 5 lb)
- School: Bassaleg Comprehensive School

Rugby union career
- Position: Prop
Senior career
Years	Team	Apps	(Points)
2006–09	Bedwas RFC	3	(0)
2006–08	Newport RFC	4	(0)
2008	Cross Keys	1	(0)
2009–10	Llanelli RFC	22	(0)
2010–12	Cardiff RFC	16	(0)
- Correct as of 10 March 2016
Provincial / State sides
Years	Team	Apps	(Points)
2006–09	Newport Gwent Dragons	19	(0)
2009–10	Scarlets	5	(0)
-	Northland		
- Correct as of 10 March 2016
International career
Years	Team	Apps	(Points)
- Wales U16
–	Wales U18		
–	Wales U19		
–	Wales U20		
–	Wales		
- Correct as of 10 March 2016

Jamie Corsi (born 30 December 1987) is a professional rugby union player. He is a former pupil of Bassaleg School, Newport. He was born in Cardiff.

A tight head prop, he played all of his junior club rugby at lock and Number 8 for Rumney RFC in East Cardiff, where he gained representative honours for Cardiff Districts, Newport Schools and Gwent Schools. He then moved on to Pontypool United where he was part of the Gwent U/16 championship winning team, before switching to tight head Prop, a position from where he won the first of his many Wales schoolboy caps. He also had a short spell with Newport High School Old Boys RFC before signing an academy contract with the Newport Gwent Dragons Regional side.

Corsi also represented Wales at Rugby League Under 13, 14, and 15 level, while playing for the Cardiff Demons.

Upon leaving Bassaleg School he took up a place at UWIC Cardiff, balancing his studies with Magners league rugby at just eighteen years of age. During his time at the Dragons he also played on permit for various Welsh Premiership clubs including Newport RFC, Pontypool RFC, Bedwas RFC, Ebbw Vale RFC and Cross Keys RFC.

He was an integral part of the Wales under 19 grand-slam winning side of 2006, and also represented his country at the 2006 Under 19 Rugby World Cup in Dubai where, along with Wales captain Bradley Davies, he was one of only two Welshmen to be selected in the organisers "World Cup – Team of the Tournament".

Corsi has represented Wales at Under 16, 18, 19 and 20 age groups and he was selected for the Wales senior squad to tour Australia in May 2007. After suffering a succession of injuries and having had very little rugby since then, at the end of the 2008–09 season Corsi left the Dragons and signed for the Scarlets on 5 August 2009.

In 2010 Corsi signed with London Wasps and was loaned to London Scottish but in December 2010 he announced that he would go play in Auckland to get more exposure to Southern Hemisphere rugby in New Zealand.

In October 2011 Corsi joined Cardiff Blues. He was forced to retire due to an injury acquired whilst touring Australia with the Welsh national team in 2012.

He now works as a PE teacher at St Clare's School, Porthcawl.
