= David Beynon =

Wales international rugby league footballer

Personal information
- Full name: David Beynon
- Born: 1882 Wales
- Died: unknown

Playing information

Rugby union
Club
Years	Team	Pld	T	G	FG	P
≤1907–≤07	Brynmawr RFC
≤1907–07	Pontypool RFC
	Total	0	0	0	0	0

Rugby league
- Position: Stand-off
Club
Years	Team	Pld	T	G	FG	P
1907–09	Oldham	49	19	0	0	48
Representative
Years	Team	Pld	T	G	FG	P
1908	Wales	1

David Beynon (1882 – death unknown) was a Welsh rugby union and professional rugby league footballer who played in the 1900s. He played club level rugby union (RU) for Brynmawr RFC and Pontypool RFC, and representative level rugby league (RL) for Wales, and at club level for Oldham, as a stand-off.

== Club career ==
Beynon began his rugby career with local rugby union club Ebbw Vale RFC, and went on to play for Brynmawr RFC and Pontypool RFC. He made the switch to rugby league in 1907, signing for Oldham.

== International honours ==
David Beynon won a cap for Wales while at Oldham in 1908.
