= Ashley Sweet =

- Born: Ashley Sweet; 1 April 1989 (age 37) Pontypool, Wales
- Height: 195 cm (6 ft 5 in)
- Weight: 104 kg (16 st 5 lb)
- School: Coleg Gwent

Rugby union career
- Position: Lock
- Current team: Ebbw Vale
Senior career
Years	Team	Apps	(Points)
2016-	Dragons	2	(0)
- Correct as of 29 Aug 2017

Ashley Sweet (born 1 April 1989) is a Welsh rugby union player who plays as a lock forward having previously played for Cross Keys RFC, Cardiff RFC, Ebbw Vale RFC, Newport RFC and Pontypool United RFC. He was released by the Dragons regional team at the end of the 2017-18 season.
