= Damien Hudd =

Wales international rugby league & union footballer

Personal information
- Full name: Damien Hudd
- Born: 5 February 1981 (age 44); Wales

Playing information

Rugby union
- Position: Lock
Club
Years	Team	Pld	T	G	FG	P
2002	Tredegar RFC
2002–03	Ebbw Vale RFC
2004	Brynmawr RFC
2005	Cross Keys RFC
2010	Brynmawr
2010	Ebbw Vale RFC
	Total	0	0	0	0	0

Rugby league
- Position: Prop, Second-row
Club
Years	Team	Pld	T	G	FG	P
2003–05	Torfaen Tigers
2008	Newport Titans
	Total	0	0	0	0	0
Representative
Years	Team	Pld	T	G	FG	P
2003–05	Wales	2

Damien Hudd (born 5 February 1981) is a Welsh professional rugby union and rugby league footballer who played in the 2000s and 2010s. He has played club level rugby union (RU) for Tredegar RFC, Ebbw Vale RFC, Brynmawr RFC (two spells), and Cross Keys RFC, as a lock, and representative level rugby league (RL) for Wales, and at club level for Torfaen Tigers and Newport Titans, as a prop or second-row. He captained Ebbw Vale RFC in their 2010-11 season in Division One East in which they won the league competition. In June 2011 it was announced that he had signed for Ebbw Vale for the season 2011-12.

== International honours ==
Damien Hudd won caps for Wales (RL) while at Torfaen Tigers 2003…2004 1(2?)-caps + 1-cap (interchange/substitute).
