= Kingsley Jones (rugby union, born 1969) =

Wales international rugby union footballer & coach

- Born: Philip Kingsley Brian Jones; 19 June 1970 (age 56) Nantyglo, Wales
- Height: 1.84 m (6 ft 0 in)
- Weight: 98 kg (15 st 6 lb)

Rugby union career
- Position(s): Flanker, Number 8
Amateur team(s)
Years	Team	Apps	(Points)
- Abertillery
Senior career
Years	Team	Apps	(Points)
1993–1994	Cross Keys	16	(0)
1994–1995	Pontypridd		
1995–1998	Ebbw Vale		
1998–2001	Gloucester	47	(15)
2000	Barbarians	1	(0)
2001–2002	Worcester	21	(15)
2002–2003	Pontypridd		
2002	Ebbw Vale (Permit)	0	
2003–2004	Doncaster (Player–Coach)	23	(20)
- Correct as of 28 September 2017
International career
Years	Team	Apps	(Points)
1995&2001	Wales A	2	(5)
1996–1998	Wales	10	(0)
- Correct as of 28 September 2017
Coaching career
- Years: Team
- 2003–2004: Doncaster (Director of Rugby)
- 2004–2005: Sale Sharks (Forwards Coach)
- 2005–2009: Sale Sharks (Head Coach)
- 2009–2011: Sale Sharks (Director of Rugby)
- 2011: Russia (Asst. Coach)
- 2011–2014: Russia (Head Coach)
- 2012: London Welsh (Consultant)
- 2013–2014: NPG Dragons (Asst. Coach)
- 2014–2017: NPG Dragons (Head Coach)
- 2017–2024: Canada
- Correct as of 28 September 2017

Kingsley Jones (born 19 June 1970) is a Welsh rugby union coach, currently in charge of the Canadian national team. A former Welsh international player, Jones has played and coached at various levels, from playing at the amateur level to the professional level in Wales and England. He since went on to become a professional coach at club and international level.

== Personal life ==
Jones often appears on BBC 2 Wales' regular Sunday rugby union programme Scrum V.

His father, Phil Kingsley Jones, is the former manager of Jonah Lomu. Two of his sons Dorian Jones and Rhys Jones are current professional rugby union players.

== Playing career ==
Jones, a former loose forward, first started playing for his local side Abertillery RFC (soon afterwards Abertillery became a member of the professional Welsh Premier Division) before being picked up by Cross Keys RFC in 1993. At Captaining Cross Keys, he played a single season for the side gaining experience at a higher level of the game, before moving to one of the leading sides in Wales, Pontypridd RFC in the Welsh Premier Division. Guided by Dennis John, Jones became a physical loose forward for the side, playing at Flanker or Number 8 in his sole season at the club.

In 1995, Jones joined Ebbw Vale RFC at the elite end of Welsh rugby. He was a regular in the backrow for Ebbw Vale, such that he was given captaincy on his arrival at his new club. On 24 August 1996, Jones made his international debut for Wales, starting in the backrow in a test match against the Barbarians. He gained his first cap against an international opponent a month later, starting against France in Cardiff. In 1998, he led Ebbw Vale to their first ever WRU Challenge Cup Final, only to lose to Llanelli, 19–12. In that same season, he was given captaincy of the national team in an away game to South Africa, in what was Jones' last international appearance for his country after rupturing his chiles tendon.

Ahead of the 1998/99 season, Jones crossed the border and represented Gloucester professionally for three seasons again being appointed as club captain on his arrival, before moving on to Worcester Warriors in the 2001–02 where he was appointed captain on his arrival for the third time in his career. He returned to Wales a season later, playing for Pontypridd, before ending his playing career at Doncaster as a player-coach.

He retired as a player in 2004, winning 10 caps for Wales between 1996 and 1998, and had made more than 100 appearances for a Welsh club. He had at some point captained every side that he played for, at club and international level. He had represented the Barbarians as a player on their 2000 UK tour of Ireland, Scotland, and England.

== Coaching career ==
=== Sale Sharks (2004–2011) ===
After retiring at the end of the 2003/04 season, Philippe Saint-André, who was newly appointed head coach of Sale Sharks, brought Jones in a forwards coach for the 2004–05 English Premiership. Between Saint-André and his assistants, Sale made it to the semi-final of the English Premiership, only to lose to London Wasps 43–22. Sale did however claim the 2004–05 European Challenge Cup title, after beating Pau in the final 27–3.

In 2005, Saint-André was promoted to Director of Rugby, which saw Jones replace Saint-André as head coach of the club. In Jones' first season in charge, he helped Sale go one step further and make the English Premiership final of that season. They faced Leicester Tigers in the final, who were defeated by the Sharks 45–20 to see Sale earn their first ever Premiership title. In Europe, Sale made it as far as the quarter-finals of the 2005–06 Heineken Cup, losing to Biarritz Olympique 11–6 in the knock-out game.

The 2006/07 season saw Jones's side struggle, after dropping to tenth during the English Premiership and failed to advance out of the group stage of the Heineken Cup. The following season saw Sale narrowly miss out on the knock-out stage of the 2007–08 English Premiership, however, Sale did progress to semi-finals of the 2007–08 European Challenge Cup, but in that game lost out to Bath 36–14.

The 2008/09 season was Philippe Saint-André's last season with the club after he announced in December 2008 he would be leaving his post as Director of Rugby. This meant Jones was to be promoted up to the top job with immediate effect. After Jones became Director of Rugby, he brought in Jason Robinson as head coach. In their first year of partnership, Sale narrowly remained in the top Premiership after slipping to eleventh on the table, while they failed to make much of an impact on the European scene. The 2010/11 season saw Jones bring in a new head coach to replace Robinson who left at the back end of the previous season. Mike Brewer became the full-time head coach after filling in for Robinson, however Brewer was sacked three months into the season.

2010 Barbarians V England & Ireland saw Jones again team up with Frenchman Philippe Saint Andre to coach the Barbarians with a defeat to England at Twickenham 35–28 and a win over Ireland in Thomond park 29–23.

In January 2011, Jones later announced his resignation, standing down as Director of Rugby at the club at the end of January 2011.

=== Russia (2011–2014) ===
After leaving Sale Sharks in January 2011, he joined the Russian national team as a consultant to Nikolay Nerush ahead of the 2011 Rugby World Cup, before being officially named as National teams Director just months before the World Cup. Following the World Cup, Jones became the head coach of the national team after Nerush stood down.

His first match in charge was a narrow 33–32 win away to Portugal in the second leg of the 2010–12 European Nations Cup First Division. Despite two further victories over Ukraine, 38–19, and Spain, 41–37, Russia finished fourth in Jones' first season in charge. The 2012 IRB Nations Cup saw Russia pick up a sole victory, coming against Uruguay 19–13.

The 2012–14 European Nations Cup First Division, was the first full European Nation Cup competition Jones led his team in. Across tho two-year competition, he saw Russia finish third, behind Georgia and Romania. This meant Russia progress to the final stage of the European qualification process for the 2015 Rugby World Cup. However, on 22 May, just days before their play-off match against Germany, Jones announced he would be standing down from his post at Russia following the 2015 World Cup qualifier against Germany. His final match was won by the Russians 31–20, which saw them progress to the repechage, the final stage of qualification for the 2015 Rugby World Cup.

He left his post with 11 wins from 26 games Russia never losing to a team ranked below them with Jones at the helm, a 42% win rate.

Jones was replaced with Raphaël Saint-André, brother of French national coach and former coaching partner Philippe Saint-André.

=== Newport Gwent Dragons (2013–2017) ===
In June 2013, Kingsley Jones was appointed as a consultant coach to Lyn Jones at Newport Gwent Dragons, sharing his commitments with his coaching duties in Russia. After Edwards departed the region in February 2014, Kingsley Jones took on a more hands on job with Lyn Jones, now doubling up as Director of Rugby and head coach. They had both previously worked with each other when Lyn Jones brought Kingsley Jones in as a consultant at London Welsh in 2012.

Following the disruption in the 2013/14 season at the Dragons, Jones was named head coach ahead of the 2014/15 season after he became available after his Russia duties. His first match in charge was a 16–11 loss away to Connacht. Jones picked up his first victory in the fourth round after defeating Benetton Treviso 33–15. Despite finishing ninth on the table with eight victories, the Dragons knocked over Leinster home and away in a historic first ever season double over the Irish province. This was the first time since 2009 that the Dragons had defeat Leinster. During the 2014–15 European Rugby Challenge Cup, Jones led his side to a third seed position going into the knock-out stage. In the quarter-finals, they defeated Welsh rivals Cardiff Blues 25–21, before being defeated by Edinburgh 45–16 in the semis.

In the 2015–16 Pro12 season, the Dragons won just four League games, two of which was victories over Munster and Leinster. In the 2015–16 European Rugby Challenge Cup they repeated their fortunes of the previous season, making it to the semi-finals, where this time they lost to Montpellier 22–12.

In Jones' final season in charge of the region, the Dragons slipped to eleventh on the table despite gaining 12 losing bonus points. In the second half of the season, the Dragons won just one game, with the final 8 rounds between January and the end of the season all resulting in defeats. In June 2017, it was announced that the Welsh Rugby Union was taking over the region. Following this, it was later revealed that Bernard Jackman was to replaced Jones as head coach of the region. Jones' last game in charge was a 26–24 loss to the Blues.

=== Canada (2017–2025) ===
Following his departure with the Dragons, Jones took up a new role with the Welsh Rugby Union, leading the unions exile programme. However, this was a short-term role with Jones being named the head coach of the Canadian national team on 21 September 2017 following the sacking of Mark Anscombe. Jones' first game in charge of Canada ended in a 51–9 uncapped loss to the Māori All Blacks in Vancouver. The following week, Canada had a record defeat to Georgia, losing 54–22. On 18 November, Canada Jones led Canada to their first win in 8 attempts, defeating Spain 37–27. However, Canada couldn't back this win up in their final match of their European tour, losing to Fiji 57–17, a record winning margin for the Flying Fijians over Canada.

In February 2018, Canada failed to qualify for the 2019 Rugby World Cup as Americas 2, after losing both tests to Uruguay (29–38 and 32–31). This meant Canada moved to the Repechage tournament for the first ever time. The 2018 Americas Rugby Championship saw Jones lead Canada to fourth, with wins over Brazil (45–5) and Chile (17–33). During the 2018 June test window, Canada lost all three of their games; losing 48–10 to Scotland, 43–20 to United States. In November 2018, Jones led Canada into the 2019 Rugby World Cup qualifying Repechage tournament. Canada came away with three from three victories after beating Kenya, Germany and Hong Kong to qualify for the World Cup.In his role as Director of Men’s Performance, and leader of the National Academy and Sevens alignment systems. During his tenure, he delivered key structural improvements, contributed significantly to player development pathways, and guided Canada through a uniquely challenging era for North American rugby.

In 2021 Canada failed to qualify for the 2023 Rugby World Cup in France, the first time that Canada has not been represented.

Following the 2024 season, Rugby Canada and Jones mutually agreed to part ways. His record with the team was 14-34-0 in test matches, and 17-38-0 in all matches.

== Honours ==
=== Playing ===
Pontypridd RFC

- Welsh Premier Division
  - Runners Up: 1994–95

Ebbw Vale RFC

- WRU Challenge Cup
  - Runners Up: 1997–98

=== Coaching ===
Sale Sharks

- English Premiership (As Head Coach)
  - Winners: 2005–06
- European Challenge Cup (As Asst. Coach)
  - Winners: 2004–05

Sporting positions
Preceded by (Russia) Nikolay Nerush	Russia National Rugby Union Coach; 2011–2014	Succeeded by (France) Raphaël Saint-André
Preceded by (New Zealand) Mark Anscombe	Canada National Rugby Union Coach; 2017–2024	Succeeded by (Australia) Steve Meehan
