= Brian Jones (rugby union) =

Welsh rugby union footballer (1935–2025)

- Born: Brian James Jones; 10 October 1935 Cwmcarn, Wales
- Died: April 2025 (aged 89)
- School: Pontywaun Grammar School
- University: St Luke's College, Exeter

Rugby union career
- Position: Centre
Amateur team(s)
Years	Team	Apps	(Points)
- Cross Keys RFC
1953–1964	Newport RFC		
1964–1965	Tredegar RFC		
1966–1967	Newport RFC		
- Devonport Services
- Combined Services
- Royal Navy
- Barbarian F.C.
- Devon
International career
Years	Team	Apps	(Points)
1960	Wales	2	(0)
Coaching career
- Years: Team
- 1967–1968: Newport RFC
- 1968–1969: Oxford University RFC

Brian James Jones (10 October 1935 – April 2025) was a Wales international rugby union player.

Jones made his debut for Wales on 12 March 1960 versus Ireland. He played club rugby for Newport RFC. Jones died in April 2025, at the age of 89.
