= David Weatherley =

David Weatherley may refer to:

- David Weatherley (actor) (1939–2024), New Zealand actor and voice artist
- David Weatherley (rugby union) (born 1972), Welsh rugby union player
