= Mike Ruddock =

Welsh rugby union footballer and coach (born 1959)

Mike Ruddock OBE
- Born: 5 September 1959 (age 67) Blaina, Blaenau Gwent, Wales

Rugby union career
- Position: Flanker
Amateur team(s)
Years	Team	Apps	(Points)
- Blaina RFC
–	Tredegar RFC		
–	Swansea RFC		
Coaching career
- Years: Team
- 1991-1997: Swansea RFC
- 1997-2000: Leinster Rugby
- 2000-2003: Ebbw Vale RFC
- 2003-2004: Newport Gwent Dragons
- 2004-2006: Wales
- 2007-2010: Worcester Warriors
- 2010-2014: Ireland U20

Mike Ruddock, OBE (born 5 September 1959) is a Welsh rugby union coach who was later an interim consultant for Ospreys, having previously coached Lansdowne FC. Ruddock was the Director of Rugby at the Worcester Warriors from 2007 to 2010. He was the coach of the Welsh national rugby union team from 2004 until February 2006 and Leinster Coach from 1997 to 2000

He is the father of 3 children. Irish rugby union international Rhys Ruddock, Ciaran Ruddock and Katie Ruddock.

== Playing career ==
Ruddock was born in Blaina, and played in the back row for his local team, Blaina. He also played for Tredegar and Swansea, making 119 appearances for Swansea and scoring 43 tries.

He also played for Wales under-16s and Wales B, but his playing days were ended prematurely by an accident at work in 1985. Working as an electricity linesman, he fell from a pole, suffering serious injuries including three compressed vertebrae and a fractured skull.

== Coaching career ==
=== Club rugby ===
Ruddock began his career as a coach at Blaina and guided them to a Monmouthshire Premier League title and a Ben Francis Cup victory, he later coached Cross Keys and had a spell in Ireland with Bective Rangers. As coach of Swansea, he recorded a 21–6 win over the touring Australians in 1992 and won Welsh league titles in 1992 and 1994 and the Welsh Cup in 1995. In 1997, he again moved to Ireland as director of coaching at Leinster.

Returning to Wales in 2000, he coached Ebbw Vale and Wales 'A' then coached Newport Gwent Dragons with considerable success.

=== Wales national team ===
Ruddock was given control of the Wales team to face Romania in the run up to the 2003 Rugby World Cup, a match which Wales won 54–8 – their first win in 11 games.

In 2004, Steve Hansen left his post as coach of the Welsh national side to return to New Zealand, and Ruddock was appointed to the job in March 2004, following the 2004 Six Nations Championship. In his first season, Wales completed the Grand Slam in the Six Nations Championship for the first time since 1978. He received an OBE in the 2006 New Years Honours List.

On 14 February 2006, Ruddock resigned as coach of the Wales national team when contract negotiations with the WRU broke down.

=== Post Welsh national coach ===
Ruddock temporarily left rugby following his departure from the Wales team, but soon returned to the game as an assistant coach of Mumbles RFC winning the Division 3 South West title, also taking charge of a World XV and coaching the forwards of a Barbarians select team on a tour of England & South Africa. During his coaching career Ruddock won the Welsh Coach of the Year in 1992 and 2005.

=== 2007–2010 : Worcester ===
Ruddock's return to the mainstream was announced on 1 May 2007, when, two days after narrowly avoiding relegation from the Guinness Premiership, Worcester Warriors appointed Ruddock as Director of Rugby, replacing John Brain. Ruddock subsequently led Worcester to the Amlin Challenge Cup Final as well as to the Middlesex 7's final at Twickenham. Following the Warriors 12–10 defeat to Leeds Carnegie on 25 April 2010, the Worcester were relegated from the Guinness Premiership, and Mike Ruddock subsequently resigned from his post as Director of Rugby on 28 April.

=== Ireland U-20 ===
It was announced on 4 August 2010 that Ruddock was appointed as head coach of the Ireland Under-20 Team.

== See also ==
- Rhys Ruddock
