= Lonza =

Lonza may refer to:

- Lonza Group, a Swiss company
- Lonza Bowdler (1901–1962), Welsh rugby union player
- Tonko Lonza (1930–2018), Croatian actor
- Cured pork tenderloin (Italian: Lonza stagionata)
- Lonza, a river that runs through the Lötschental valley in Valais, Switzerland
- Lonza, a swift spotted beast in Dante's Inferno
