= Jack Jones (rugby, born 1890) =

Wales international rugby union & league footballer

John Jones
Personal information
- Full name: John Jones
- Born: 25 January 1890 Bedwellty, Wales
- Died: unknown

Playing information

Rugby union
- Position: Prop
Club
| Years | Team | Pld | T | G | FG | P |
|---|---|---|---|---|---|---|
| | Blackwood Crusaders |
| | Tredegar RFC |
| | Brynmawr RFC |
| | Pontypool RFC |
| ≤1914–≥14 | Abertillery RFC |
| | Total | 0 | 0 | 0 | 0 | 0 |
Representative
| Years | Team | Pld | T | G | FG | P |
| 1914 | Wales | 4 | 1 | 0 | 0 | 3 |

Rugby league
- Position: Forward
Club
| Years | Team | Pld | T | G | FG | P |
|---|---|---|---|---|---|---|
| ≥1914–15 | Oldham | 10 | 6 | 0 | 0 | 18 |
- Source: scrum.com

John Jones (25 January 1890 – death unknown), also known as Bedwellty Jones, was a Welsh rugby union, and professional rugby league footballer who played in the 1910s. He played representative level rugby union (RU) for Wales, and at club level for Abertillery RFC, as a prop, and club level rugby league (RL) for Oldham, as a forward.

== Background ==
Jones was born in Bedwellty, Wales.

== Rugby career ==
Jack Jones won caps for Wales (RU) while at Abertillery RFC in 1914 against England, Scotland, France, and Ireland. Jones, a collier by trade, was a member of the 'Terrible Eight', the nickname the Wales pack was given by the press in the games against Scotland and Ireland in 1914. Both matches were reported as very abrasive contests.

Just two weeks after his final rugby union international for Wales, in which he scored his only international points, a try against Ireland, he turned professional when he joined rugby league team Oldham. He made his début for Oldham against St. Helens on 4 April 1914, and scored three tries in the match.
