= Sam Cross =

Welsh rugby union player

- Born: 26 August 1992 (age 34) Abergavenny, Wales
- Height: 190 cm (6 ft 3 in)
- Weight: 103 kg (227 lb; 16 st 3 lb)

Rugby union career
- Position(s): Flanker; Number 8
Senior career
Years	Team	Apps	(Points)
2012–2013	Ebbw Vale		
2013–2014	Cardiff Metropolitan University		
2014–2016	Newport		
2017–2023	Ospreys	72	(25)
2023–2024	Newcastle Falcons	19	(0)
2024–	Tarbes		
International career
Years	Team	Apps	(Points)
2017	Wales	2	(0)
2023	Barbarians		
- Correct as of 12 September 2024
National sevens team
Years	Team		Comps
- Wales
Medal record
Men's rugby sevens
Representing Great Britain
Olympic Games
Silver medal – second place	2016 Rio de Janeiro	Team competition

Sam Cross (born 26 August 1992) is a Welsh rugby union player who plays for Tarbes in the Nationale competition. He previously played for Wales national team and the Wales Sevens team.

== Personal life ==
Cross was born in Abergavenny in Wales in 1992. He grew up in Brynmawr and after leaving secondary school he attended Cardiff Metropolitan University where he took up a Sport & Exercise Science scholarship.

== Rugby career ==
Cross first played rugby as a child for the Youth section of Brynmawr RFC. He then joined Ebbw Vale before switching to the Cardiff Met team. An all-round sportsman, Cross also played football at county level for Gwent and was capped for Wales in rugby league at the under-18 level.

Cross was selected for both the Welsh Students team and the GB Students, the latter at under 15 and under 18, and was part of the team that won the World Students Championships in Brive. He also played in the 2013 Students Olympics. Despite growing up playing the 15-a-side variant of rugby union, it was in rugby sevens that he made his mark. He has made over a hundred appearances as part of the Wales Sevens mainly in the World Rugby Sevens Series.

In 2016 Cross was selected to represent Great Britain at the Summer Olympics in Rio as part of the nation's rugby sevens team.

Cross was selected for Wales national team in 2017 debut from the bench against Australia. He was later selected for his first international start a few months later against Georgia and was selected for the 2018 Six Nations Championship.

Cross represented the Ospreys 71 times between 2017-2023. He played for the Barbarians in a special match against Swansea as part of their 150th anniversary of the club. After six seasons for Ospreys, it was announced that Cross would join English side Newcastle Falcons in the Premiership Rugby competition for the 2023-24 season.

On 18 May 2024, Cross travels to France to sign for Tarbes in the third division Nationale for the 2024-25 season.
