= Richard Rees =

Richard Rees may refer to:

- Sir Richard Rees, 2nd Baronet (1900–1970), British diplomat, writer, humanitarian, and painter
- Richard Rees (politician) (1859–1935), Australian politician
- Richard Rees (rugby union) (born 1971), Welsh rugby union winger
- Richie Rees (born 1983), Welsh rugby union scrum-half

== See also ==
- Richard Reese
