= Byron Hayward =

Wales international rugby union footballer

- Born: Byron Idris Hayward; 22 February 1969 (age 57) Cardiff, Wales
- Height: 5 ft 7 in (170 cm)
- Weight: 13 st 5 lb (85 kg)

Rugby union career
- Position(s): Fly Half, Full Back
Amateur team(s)
| Years | Team | Apps | (Points) |
- Abertillery RFC
| – | Ebbw Vale RFC | | |
| – | Llanelli RFC | | |
| – | Gloucester Rugby | | |
| – | Sale Sharks | | |
| – | Pontypool RFC | | |
International career
| Years | Team | Apps | (Points) |
| 1998 | Wales | 2 | (15) |
Coaching career
- Years: Team
- Ebbw Vale RFC
- –: Newport Gwent Dragons
- –: Newbridge RFC

Byron Idris Hayward (born 22 May 1969) is a former international rugby union full back who played for Wales and Wales A. He had an impressive debut for Wales scoring three tries in his first international match against Zimbabwe. Hayward caused controversy in 2000 by refusing to play against Scotland A in Bridgend because of the inclusion of foreign players Shane Howarth and Brett Sinkinson. This was in the heat of the Grannygate scandal, both players claimed to have Welsh grandparents that would later be found to be false.

Byron Hayward started his rugby career at Abertillery RFC. He mainly played his club rugby for Ebbw Vale RFC but as the club went into administration he and fellow Welsh international and club captain Kingsley Jones were sold. He joined Llanelli RFC but as he could not hold down a starting place would later move to Gloucester Rugby reuniting him with Jones, who had joined from Worcester RFC.

After Gloucester Rugby, Hayward moved north to play for the Sale Sharks where he mainly played as an acting fly half. In 2001 Hayward returned to Welsh rugby with Welsh Premier Pontypool RFC, spending three seasons with the Gwent club and helping 'Pooler' to win the Division 1 championship in 2003. He left Pontypool at the end of the 2002/3 season and returned to Ebbw Vale RFC where he was later made head coach. In January 2006 he was replaced by one cap England International Alex Codling as coach despite Vale winning holiday derbies against Newport RFC and old club Pontypool. Today Hayward works as defence coach for the WRU

By the time Hayward retired from rugby he had scored a then joint record (with Neil Jenkins) 2535 league points.

== Boxing ==
Whilst playing professional rugby, Hayward also continued to box as an amateur for his local club.
