= Winmill =

Winmill is a surname. Notable people with the surname include:

- B. Lynn Winmill (born 1952), American judge
- Charles Winmill (1865–1945), English architect
- Sammie Winmill (born 1948), British actress
- Stanley Winmill (1889–1940), Welsh rugby player
