= Jack Hurrell =

Wales international rugby union player

- Born: John Richard Hurrell; 17 August 1933 Cwmcarn, Wales
- Died: 2003 (aged 69) Solihull, England

Rugby union career
- Position: Centre
Amateur team(s)
Years	Team	Apps	(Points)
?-1957	Cross Keys RFC		
1957-1962	Newport RFC		
1962-1963	Tredegar RFC		
International career
Years	Team	Apps	(Points)
1959	Wales	1	(0)

John Richard "Jack" Hurrell (17 August 1933 – 2003) was a Welsh international rugby union centre who played club rugby for Cross Keys RFC, Tredegar and Newport. He was awarded just one cap for Wales facing France in the 1959 Five Nations Championship.

== Personal history ==
Hurrell was born in Cwmcarn, Monmouthshire, in 1933. An electrician by trade, he left Wales and moved to Birmingham after his rugby career came to an end. He dies at the wheel of his car near his home in Solihull in 2003.

== Club career ==
Hurrell began playing rugby as a school boy and in 1951 he was capped for the Welsh Youth team travelling to Cork where they defeated Munster (Ireland) Youth by 15-3. As a senior he joined Cross Keys RFC playing at fly-half and was captain for three seasons between 1954/55 and 1956/57. Whilst at Cross Keys he was selected as part of a joint Cross Keys/Pontypool team that faced the 1953/54 New Zealand team. Hurrell played for around 180 games for Cross Keys amassing 41 tries over his time there. He switched to Newport for the 1957-58 season where he converted his positional play to a centre.

Hurrell spent five seasons with Newport, playing 89 games and scoring 16 tries. It was while at Newport that Hurrell obtained his only Wales cap, and in 1957 he was selected for his club to face the 1957 touring Australia team, scoring a try in Newport's 0-11 victory. He switched from Newport to Tredegar in 1962, but only played one season for them before retiring from rugby.

== International career ==
Hurrell was selected to represent Wales on 4 April 1959 against France at Stade Colombes. He played at centre alongside Malcolm Price. Wales lost 11-3 and Hurrell was not selected for his country again.

=== International matches played ===
Wales

- France 1959

== Bibliography ==
- Jenkins, John M. (1991). Who's Who of Welsh International Rugby Players. Wrexham: Bridge Books. ISBN 1-872424-10-4.
- Smith, David; Williams, Gareth (1980). Fields of Praise: The Official History of The Welsh Rugby Union. Cardiff: University of Wales Press. ISBN 0-7083-0766-3.
