= Blaina RFC =

Welsh rugby union club, based in Blaina, Blaenau Gwent

- Full name: Blaina Rugby Football Club
- Nickname: Lambs
- Founded: 1875; 151 years ago
- Location: Blaina, Wales
- Ground: Central Park (Capacity: 2,000)
- President: Kevin Knapp
- Coach(es): Craig Edwards, Frills & Kieron Dash
- League: WRU Division 1 East
- 2025/26: N/A
Team kit

Official website
- www.blainarugbyclub.co.uk

Blaina Rugby Football Club are a Welsh rugby union club based in Blaina in the county borough of Blaenau Gwent in Wales. They presently play in the Welsh Rugby Union Division 1 East league and are a feeder club for the Newport Gwent Dragons.

== History ==
Towards the end of the 19th century industrialism in the late Industrial Revolution was spreading through the South Wales Valleys. With the migrant workers into the South Wales coalfield came the game of rugby union and in 1875 players from local sides amalgamated to form a club which played on a ground provided by the Lancaster company. Their chief patron and founder was a Mr. Sidney Lancaster. The club applied for and was accepted into the Welsh Football Union in 1895. That same year, Blaina joined the newly formed Monmouthshire league, along with teams such as Abercarn, Cwmbran, Ebbw Vale and Pontymister RFC began to produce a crop of players with good potential.

In 1904, as part of the Home Nations Championship, Jack Evans became the first player to be directly capped for an international team from the club. Evans played just one match for Wales, a draw away to England, but showed great commitment to his team throughout his life, and he refused several approaches to turn professional. The draw of professionalism was a problem towards all union clubs, and Blaina lost one of their better internationals when Emlyn Watkins joined Leeds RLFC in 1927, just after collecting three caps in the 1926 Five Nations Championship.

In 1913, the WFU decided to reintroduce a knock-out competition to combat the growing popularity of association football. Although the competition was not a great success, its inaugural year saw Blaina face Aberavon in the final at Bridgend. Blaina lost in the final 10-0.

In May 2006 Blaina RFC were one of the 13 'Rebel' clubs who brought a vote of no confidence against the WRU, which centred on financing and the handling of former coach Mike Ruddock's departure. The vote failed heavily with only 20 votes for the motion and over 300 against.

== Club honours ==
- WFU Cup Runners-Up 1909/10
- WRU Division Three Cup Runners-Up 2023-24
- WRU Division One Cup Winners 2025-26

== Notable players ==
See also Category:Blaina RFC players

- (Wales) Jake Blackmore
- Tom Clapp (14 caps) - Wales captain
- (Wales) Jack Evans (1 cap)
- (Wales) William Evans
- (Wales) Jack Gore (4 caps)
- (Wales) Tom Graham (12 caps)
- Mike Ruddock (Wales B Cap)
- (Wales) Emlyn Watkins (3 caps)
- (Wales) Jack Wetter
- (Wales) Jack Williams (7 caps)

== Bibliography ==
- Jenkins, John M.; et al. (1991). Who's Who of Welsh International Rugby Players. Wrexham: Bridge Books. ISBN 1-872424-10-4.
- Smith, David; Williams, Gareth (1980). Fields of Praise: The Official History of The Welsh Rugby Union. Cardiff: University of Wales Press. ISBN 0-7083-0766-3.
