= Phil Thomas (rugby) =

GB & Wales international rugby league footballer

Personal information
- Full name: Philip Thomas
- Born: 6 December 1877 Wales
- Died: 25 May 1915 (aged 37) Belgium

Playing information

Rugby union
Club
Years	Team	Pld	T	G	FG	P
≤1904–04	Tredegar RFC

Rugby league
- Position: Centre
Club
Years	Team	Pld	T	G	FG	P
1902–04	Oldham	44	7	0	0	21
≤1908–≥08	Leeds
≤1911–≥11	Hull Kingston Rovers	102	26	0	0	78
	Total	146	33	0	0	99
Representative
Years	Team	Pld	T	G	FG	P
1905	Other Nationalities	1	1	0	0	3
1907–08	Yorkshire	2	0	0	0	0
1908–11	Wales	4	0	0	0	0
1908	Great Britain	1	0	0	0	0

Philip Thomas (1877 – 1915) was a Welsh rugby union and professional rugby league footballer who played in the 1900s and 1910s. He played club level rugby union (RU) for Tredegar RFC, and representative level rugby league (RL) for Great Britain, Wales and Yorkshire, and at club level for Oldham, Leeds, Hull Kingston Rovers and Harrogate ARLFC, as a centre.

== Playing career ==
=== Club career ===
Phil Thomas changed rugby football codes from rugby union to rugby league when he transferred from Tredegar RFC to Oldham, he made his début for Oldham playing at centre in the 26–0 victory over Hunslet F.C. at Watersheddings, Oldham on Saturday 4 October 1902, and he played his last match for Oldham playing at centre in the 2–5 defeat by Bradford F.C. at Watersheddings, Oldham on Saturday 23 January 1904. He transferred from Oldham to Leeds, he transferred from Leeds to Hull Kingston Rovers, he transferred from Hull Kingston Rovers to Harrogate ARLFC.

Phil Thomas played at centre in Hull Kingston Rovers' 10-22 defeat by Huddersfield in the 1911–12 Yorkshire Cup Final during the 1911–12 season at Belle Vue, Wakefield on Saturday 25 November 1911, in front of a crowd of 20,000.

=== Representative honours ===
Phil Thomas won caps for Wales (RL) while at Leeds, and Hull Kingston Rovers 4-caps 1908...1911, and won a cap for Great Britain (RL) while at Leeds in 1908 against New Zealand.

Phil Thomas won cap(s) for Yorkshire while at Leeds, including against New Zealand at Belle Vue, Wakefield on Wednesday 18 December 1907.

== Death ==
Thomas was killed in action in Belgium during the First World War on 25 May 1915.
