= Will Davies (rugby) =

Wales international rugby league & union player

Personal information
- Full name: William T. Davies
- Born: Wales

Playing information

Rugby union
Club
Years	Team	Pld	T	G	FG	P
	Tredegar RFC

Rugby league
- Position: Wing
Club
Years	Team	Pld	T	G	FG	P
1903–10	Batley	208	74	19	2	264
1910–13	Halifax	58	38	1	0	116
	Total	266	112	20	2	380
Representative
Years	Team	Pld	T	G	FG	P
1909–12	Wales	4	0	0	0	0
1911	Great Britain	1	2	0	0	6

William T. Davies was a Welsh rugby union and professional rugby league footballer who played in the 1900s and 1910s. He played club level rugby union (RU) for Tredegar RFC, and representative level rugby league (RL) for Great Britain and Wales, and at club level for Batley and Halifax, as a wing.

== Playing career ==
=== Club career ===
Davies debuted for Batley in 1903. He was transferred to Halifax in November 1910.

=== International honours ===
Will Davies won 4 caps for Wales (RL) in 1909–1912 while at Batley and Halifax, and won a cap for Great Britain (RL) while at Halifax in 1911 against Australia.
