= John Funnell =

Wales international rugby union player

- Full name: John Stuart Funnell
- Born: 16 September 1975 (age 51) Neath, Wales
- Height: 5 ft 9 in (175 cm)
- Weight: 196 lb (89 kg)

Rugby union career
- Position: Centre
International career
Years	Team	Apps	(Points)
1998	Wales	2	(0)

John Stuart Funnell (born 16 September 1975) is a Welsh former rugby union international.

Born in Neath, Funnell played his early senior rugby with Neath RFC and formed a successful centre combination with Leigh Davies, a partnership which began at underage level. He appeared next for Ebbw Vale and then Bridgend.

Funnell earned his first Wales call up for the 1996 tour of Australia, where he remained uncapped, before getting another chance in 1998 when he was a last minute replacement for Allan Bateman on the tour of Africa. His Wales debut came in a win over Zimbabwe in Harare and he was capped again in the Test against South Africa at Loftus Versfeld Stadium, which resulted in the team's heaviest ever defeat at the hands of the Springboks.

Post rugby, Funnell has been running a decorative living company in Hay-on-Wye.

== See also ==
- List of Wales national rugby union players
