= Darril Williams =

Welsh rugby union player (born 1975)

- Born: Darril John Williams; 20 September 1975 (age 51) Swansea, Wales
- Height: 5 ft 11 in (1.80 m)
- Weight: 88 kg (13 st 12 lb)
- University: Cardiff University

Rugby union career
- Position: Fullback
Senior career
Years	Team	Apps	(Points)
?-1997, 2002-2003, 2004-?	Bonymaen RFC		
1997-1999	Llanelli RFC	62	
2000-?	Neath RFC		
2003	Aberavon RFC	8	(5)
International career
Years	Team	Apps	(Points)
1998	Wales	1	(0)

Darril John Williams (born 20 September 1975) is a Welsh International rugby union player. He made one appearance for the Welsh national team, as well as representing Llanelli RFC and Neath RFC in the top division of Welsh club rugby.

== Rugby career ==
Williams joined Llanelli RFC from Bonymaen RFC ahead of the 1997/98 season. While at Llanelli, Williams made five appearances for Wales on a tour to South Africa. Williams made his only capped appearance for the Wales in the 1998 tour match against South Africa. Williams came on as a second-half substitute.

Williams made his 62nd and final appearances for Llanelli in the game against Cardiff RFC in December 1999. He then took a sabbatical for the remainder of the 1999/2000 season to concentrate on his dental studies. He returned to rugby with Neath RFC for the 2000/01 season. He played five games for Neath when a serious knee injury prevented him from playing rugby for two years.

Williams returned to Bonymaen RFC for the 2002/03 season. For the start of the 2003/04 season, he moved to Aberavon RFC, but moved back to Bonymaen in January 2004.

== Personal life ==
Williams was awarded a Bachelor of Dental Surgery in 2000 from the Cardiff University School of Dentistry. He runs a dental surgery in Mumbles, Swansea.
