= Abertillery RFC =

Welsh rugby union club, based in Abertillery

(Wales) AbertilleryBG RFC
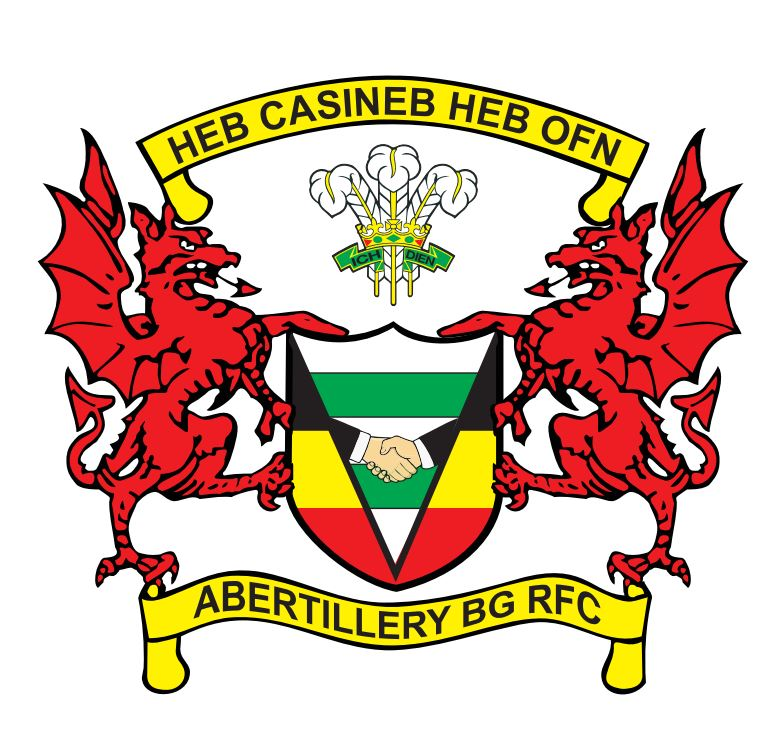
- Full name: Abertillery Blaenau Gwent Rugby Football Club
- Nickname: Green Army
- Founded: 1883; 143 years ago
- Location: Abertillery, Wales
- Ground: Abertillery Park – capacity 15,250
- Coach(es): Matt Penny, Nick Meredith & Dan Crandon
- League: WRU Championship East
- 2024/25: 1st WRU Division One East
Team kit

Official website
- www.facebook.com/Abertillery.BG.RFC

Abertillery Rugby Football Club is a Welsh rugby union club based in Abertillery. They were founded in 1883 by a coal miner named Doug Wallace, who was a local resident who moved from Scotland in 1882, Wallace was known for his commitment for the club until he died in 1899.

== Club history ==
=== 1883–1914 ===
According to the club's official centenary book, Abertillery Rugby Football Club, Abertillery were founded on 21 September 1883 in a local public house, The Prince of Wales. Like many towns and villages in Wales in the late 1880s, Abertillery was home to many rugby teams; these included Abertillery Town, Abertillery Harlequins, Abertillery Wednesdays, Heart of Oak and Abertillery Rovers. Abertillery FC and another local team from Abertillery amalgamated around September 1887 into a single club called "Abertillery Football Club". These clubs had periods of growth and decline until two main teams emerged, Abertillery Town and Harlequins; these two sides merged into a single club known as Abertillery RFC in 1901. The early clubs did not originally own a match pitch of their own, so relied on sympathetic landowners to let them play on vacant fields. These included the Gas Works Field and Old Barn Field. The club also did not possess a club-house, so from 1890 they used Wilkinson's Temperance Hotel.

During the first decade of the clubs' existence, matches were difficult to arrange and games often resulted in on-pitch arguments regarding the interpretation of rules. Abertillery would often arrange for a joint team to face more established clubs, and in 1888 an Abertillery team travelled to Cardiff to face Cardiff Harlequins at Sophia Gardens; the game quickly broke down into a 'violent war' before a lengthy discussion the game was eventually resumed. By 1892, Abertillery Town were facing other local clubs including Aberbeeg, Tredegar and Brynmawr. 1895 saw Abertillery enter the newly formed Monmouthshire League, and in January 1898 Abertillery were top of the league, but fell away in the second half of the season to finish fifth. The same year saw the purchase of the Old Barn Field by the local council, and it was renamed the Park and Recreation Ground. Although not available immediately to the local clubs it would slowly become home to the local teams. The 1890s ended with Abertillery Town, proposing in their annual meeting, that they and the Abertillery Harlequins, whose team numbers had reached 40 during the 1897–98 season should merge as a single team. The offer was declined, but a further suggestion was made to form an athletic club for the mutual benefit of all the town's sporting organisations.

The most notable members of the early 1890s team were the Boots family, consisting of D.J. Boots, G.W. Boots and E. Boots. David John Boots not only played for Abertillery, but later switched to first class team Newport. D.J. Boots represented Newport from 1899 through to 1907, and was the fullback for the team when they faced the touring South Africans in 1906.

1901 saw the eventual merging of the Abertillery Town and Harlequin teams, whose union formed Abertillery Rugby Football Club. This was followed during the 1901/1902 season with the formation of the Abertillery Athletic Club, which saw the football and cricket clubs combine. The Abertillery rugby team continued to grow, but would often slip back towards the more lawless style of their early years. In August 1903 the club fell out with the Monmouthshire Football League, refusing to comply with an order to replay a match with Blaina, which was followed in September with a game against Pill Harriers that descended into a brawl.

The early 1900s saw the emergence of two of Abertillery's first two star players, Joe Winmill and Alfred "Jim" Webb. Winmill was club captain for six seasons between 1902 and 1909, and was chosen to represent Monmouthshire at county level. Winmill's younger brother was Stanley Winmill, who played for Cross Keys and was selected to play for Wales in 1921. Webb became the first player to play international rugby directly from Abertillery. He played in three Welsh Championship-winning teams and was selected to play for the British Isles team on their tour of South Africa in 1910.

1907 was a key year for Abertillery; Jim Webb earned his first cap for Wales, against Scotland in the 1907 Home Nations Championship and as the senior team topped the Monmouthshire League, they earned the right to face Australia on their 1908 tour of Britain. The one downside to the season was the draw of professional rugby league on the club, losing one of their best players, wing E. J. Watkins to Warrington RLFC for the sum of £180.

The 1908–09 season began with the arranging of an impressive fixture list, which as well as the Monmouthshire League teams, included matches to be played against Swansea, Llanelli and Neath. The highlight of the season was the game against the touring Australians which took place on 22 December 1908. This was the first time Abertillery faced international opposition, and the town came to a standstill to welcome the tourists. The collieries finished work early, shops closed and the schools had a half-day holiday. Hundreds of people waited outside the railway station and greeted the Australian team with cheers and songs. This was the twenty-seventh match for the Australians, and so far the team had only lost three games, against Llanelli, a Combined Midlands team and the Wales national team. Abertillery, led by Winmill held them to a 3–3 draw and became the first team to prevent Australia from scoring a try. Australia took the lead in the game with a penalty, before Billy Bowen equalised for Abertillery. Fred Wood, the Australian vice-captain, said later, that the Abertillery pack were the finest the team had met on the tour.

The 1909/10 season saw Abertillery win the Monmouthshire League for the third time, losing just a single game during the campaign. The Club decided that the Monmouthshire League was now too small for Abertillery, and decided to leave the competition to challenge larger teams. The season ended with Jim Webb being called to join the British Isles team in South Africa as a replacement. Over the next few seasons, Abertillery continued improving their fixture lists, and on 21 October 1911, beat Llanelli for the very first time. This result, along with a similar upset caused by Pontypool beating Swansea, was described in the Western Mail as 'History in the making...'

By the end of the 1914, Abertillery had produced three internationals, with Jake Blackmore (1909) and Jack "Bedwellty" Jones (1914) joining Jim Webb. The team had also settled on their team strip with the green and white colours being worn at every game. With the outbreak of World War I, all organised rugby matches came to a halt, and about 2000 men from the town signed up to join the British Army.

=== Present day ===
In 2002 Abertillery RFC, followed Brynmawr RFC and withdrew from the Principality Cup, after the Welsh Rugby Union made an error during the live draw for the fifth round. Within the week, the club made a complete about turn and begged the WRU to be allowed back in the competition.

== Achievements ==
Abertillery have been Welsh Champions twice. They have provided players for Wales and the British Lions, including Haydn Morgan, Allan Lewis, Robert Norster, Byron Hayward, Rupert Moon and the late Alun Pask. They have more recently provided Ospreys players, notably Shaun Connor.

== Club honours ==
- Welsh Championship Champions – 1930–31
- WRU Division One East Champions – 2024-25
- WRU Division Two East Champions – 2015-16
- WRU Division Three East Champions – 2012-13, 2021-22 (No Promotion), 2022-23
- WRU Division Four East Champions – 2011-12
- WRU Division Four East Runners-Up (Promoted) – 2007–08, 2009–10
- WRU Division Five East Champions – 2006-07
- WRU Division Three Cup Winners – 2022-23
- Colin Tuckwell Bowl Champions – 2021-22

== Notable former players ==
See also Category:Abertillery RFC players

- (Wales) Jake Blackmore (1 cap)
- (Wales) Albert Fear (4 caps)
- (Wales) Bill Griffin
- (Wales) Keith Jarrett
- (Wales) John "Jack" 'Bedwellty' Jones
- (Wales) Allan Lewis (6 caps)
- (Wales) Glyn Meredith
- (Wales) Rupert Moon
- (Wales) Haydn Morgan (27 caps)
- (Wales) Bob Norster
- (Wales) George Parsons (1 cap)
- (Wales) Alun Pask (26 caps)
- (Wales) William Charles "Wick" Powell
- (Wales) Raymond "Ray" Price
- (Wales) David "Dai" Rees 24 years Bradford Northern Coach
- (Wales) Thomas "Tom" Rees
- (Wales) Trevor 'Ocker' Thomas (1 cap)
- (Wales) David Watkins
- (Wales) Evan Watkins
- (Wales) Jim Webb (19 caps)

== Games played against international opposition ==
Year	Date	Opponent	Result	Score	Tour
1908	22 December	Australia	Draw	3–3	1908 Australian tour of the British Isles
1919	5 April	New Zealand Army	Loss	0–3	New Zealand Army rugby team of 1919
1931^{1}	14 October	South Africa	Loss	9–10	1931–32 South Africa rugby union tour
1953^{2}	23 December	New Zealand	Loss	3–22	The 1953 New Zealand Tour of British Isles, France, Canada & California.
1958^{2}	8 January	Australia	Won	6–5	1957–58 Australia rugby union tour of Britain, Ireland and France
1960^{2}	29 November	South Africa	Loss	0–3	The 1960 South Africa Tour of UK & France
1963^{2}	6 November	New Zealand	Loss	0–13	1963–64 New Zealand rugby union tour of Britain, Ireland, France and North America
1964^{3}	24 September	Fiji	Draw	11–11	1964 Fiji tour of the British Isles and France
1983	8 October	Japan	Loss	13–17	1983 Japan rugby union tour of Wales

^{1} A joint Abertillery/Cross Keys team
^{2} A joint Abertillery/Ebbw Vale team
^{3} A joint Abertillery/Newbridge team

== Bibliography ==
- Jenkins, John M.; et al. (1991). Who's Who of Welsh International Rugby Players. Wrexham: Bridge Books. ISBN 1-872424-10-4.
- Smith, David; Williams, Gareth (1980). Fields of Praise: The Official History of The Welsh Rugby Union. Cardiff: University of Wales Press. ISBN 0-7083-0766-3.
- Thomas, Irene; Thomas, Keith (1983). Abertillery Rugby Football Club 1883–1983. Barry: Stewart Williams. ISBN 0-900807-57-1.
