= Evan Watkins =

Welsh rugby union and rugby league footballer, and cricketer

Personal information
- Full name: Evan William Watkins
- Born: third ¼ 1882 Merthyr Tydfil, Wales
- Died: 9 January 1956 (aged 73) Cardiff, Wales

Playing information

Rugby union
Club
Years	Team	Pld	T	G	FG	P
	Abertillery RFC
	Monmouthshire County RFC
	Total	0	0	0	0	0

Rugby league
- Position: Wing
Club
Years	Team	Pld	T	G	FG	P
1908	Warrington	9	5	0	0	15
- Relatives: Edgar Watkins (brother)

Evan William Watkins (third ¼ 1882 – 9 January 1956) was a Welsh rugby union, and professional rugby league footballer who played in the 1900s, and cricketer who played in the 1900s and 1910s. He played representative level rugby union (RU) for Monmouthshire, and at club level for Abertillery, and club level rugby league (RL) for Warrington, as a wing. He also played cricket for Monmouthshire.

== Playing career ==
Evan Watkins made his début for Warrington on Saturday 8 February 1908, and he played his last match for Warrington on Friday 17 April 1908. He played cricket for Abertillery Town Cricket Club, Blaina Cricket Club, and Monmouthshire in the Minor Counties Championship between 1909 and 1911, making 6 appearances.

== Personal life ==
Evan Watkins' younger brother was the Olympic gymnast Edgar Watkins.
