= Trevor Williams (rugby union) =

Welsh rugby union player (1907–1982)

- Full name: Trevor George Williams
- Born: 12 May 1907 Cwmaman, Wales
- Died: 27 August 1982 (aged 75) Newbridge, Wales

Rugby union career
- Position: Forward
International career
Years	Team	Apps	(Points)
1935–37	Wales	8	(0)

Trevor George Williams (12 May 1907 – 27 August 1982) was a Welsh international rugby union player.

A collier by profession, Williams played his rugby for Cross Keys and was capable of playing all forward positions. He was capped eight times for Wales, debuting against Scotland in 1935 when Edgar Jones was omitted. His last appearance came during the 1937 Home Nations, for much of which he was sidelined with a rib injury.

== See also ==
- List of Wales national rugby union players
