= Jack Williams (rugby union, born 1888) =

Wales international rugby union player (1888-1965)

- Full name: John Alfred Williams
- Born: 7 August 1888 Garnfach, Wales
- Died: 6 December 1965 (aged 77) Abergavenny, Wales

Rugby union career
- Position: Prop
International career
Years	Team	Apps	(Points)
1920–21	Wales	7	(3)

John Alfred Williams (7 August 1888 – 6 December 1965) was a Welsh international rugby union player.

A powerfully–built forward, Williams was known by the nickname "Punch" and gained seven Wales caps, across their 1920 and 1921 Five Nations campaigns. He was selected from Blaina RFC and later played for the Aberaman club, which he also served as a secretary. An attempt was made to recruit him to rugby league in 1921.

== See also ==
- List of Wales national rugby union players
