= Tredegar Ironsides RFC =

(Wales) Tredegar Ironsides RFC
- Full name: Tredegar Ironsides Rugby Football Club
- Nickname: Irons
- Founded: 1946
- Location: Tredegar, Wales
- Ground: The Rec
- Chairman: Derek Burke
- President: A.J. Reeves
- Coach(es): Steve Evans, Craig Monaghan, Mark Williams
- League: WRU Division Three East
- 2011-2012: 12th
Team kit

Official website
- www.tredegar-ironsides.ik.com

Tredegar Ironsides Rugby Football Club is a rugby union, from Tredegar in South Wales. The club is a member of the Welsh Rugby Union and is a feeder club for the Newport Gwent Dragons.

The Ironsides were formed in 1946 from returning World War II servicemen, after meeting in a local public house, the Talbot Hotel. Their first game was against a club from Rhymney, which Tredegar won.

Gareth S. Kearney holds the record for most points in a season.

== Notable former players ==
- (Wales) Mark Jones
