= Edgar Watkins =

British gymnast (1887–1960)

- Full name: Edgar Lewis Watkins
- Born: 12 May 1887 Ferndale, Rhondda Cynon Taf, Wales
- Died: 1960 (aged 72–73) Plymouth, England
- Relatives: Evan Watkins (brother)

Gymnastics career
- Discipline: Men's artistic gymnastics
- Country represented: (United Kingdom) Great Britain

Edgar Lewis Watkins (12 May 1887 – 1960) was a British gymnast. He competed in the men's team event at the 1908 Summer Olympics.

Watkins was a member of the Powell's Tillery Gymnastics Club of Abertillery, formed in 1903; most were local miners. Edgar Watkins was recorded as a member of the team in 1904. He was a member of the Powell's Tillery team that won the Welsh Amateur Gymnastics Shield in 1906 and again in 1908, and in March 1908, aged 19, he won the Individual Gymnastic Championship of Wales at his first attempt, while studying for a colliery manager's certificate. On the strength of this performance, he was selected to captain the Welsh national gymnastics team, the youngest man ever to do so. He was one of three team members to be entered in the Olympic Games in 1908. He continued his career with the club in 1909.

Watkins' elder brother was Evan Watkins, a professional rugby player and cricketer.
