= Emlyn Watkins =

Wales dual-code international rugby footballer

Personal information
- Full name: Emlyn Watkins
- Born: 21 September 1904; Blaina, Wales
- Died: 15 May 1978 (aged 73); Walsall, England

Playing information

Rugby union
- Position: Flanker
Club
Years	Team	Pld	T	G	FG	P
≤1926–≥26	Blaina RFC
Representative
Years	Team	Pld	T	G	FG	P
1926	Wales	3	1	0	0	3

Rugby league
- Position: Second-row
Club
Years	Team	Pld	T	G	FG	P
1926–27	Leeds
1927	Oldham RLFC	116	10	0	0	30
1942–43	Oldham RLFC (guest)
	Total	116	10	0	0	30
Representative
Years	Team	Pld	T	G	FG	P
1927	Monmouthshire	≥1
1926–27	Wales	4
1929–30	Other Nationalities	2

Emlyn Watkins (21 September 1904 – 15 May 1978) was a Welsh dual-code international rugby union and professional rugby league footballer who played in the 1920s. He played representative level rugby union (RU) for Wales, and at club level for Blaina RFC, as a flanker, and representative level rugby league (RL) for Wales and Monmouthshire, and at club level for Leeds and Oldham RLFC, as a second-row.

== Background ==
Watkins was born in Blaina, Wales, and he died in Walsall.

== Playing career ==
=== International honours ===
Emlyn Watkins won caps for Wales (RU) while at Blaina RFC in 1926 against Scotland, Ireland, and France, and won cap(s) for Wales (RL) while at Leeds 1926(1927) 3(1)-caps.

=== County honours ===
Emlyn Watkins played at second-row in Monmouthshire's 14-18 defeat by Glamorgan in the non-County Championship match during the 1926–27 season at Taff Vale Park, Pontypridd on Saturday 30 April 1927.
