= Allan Lewis (rugby union) =

British Lions & Wales international rugby union player (born 1942)

- Born: Robert Allan Lewis; 7 October 1942 (age 84) Blaenavon, Wales

Rugby union career
- Position: Scrum-half
Senior career
Years	Team	Apps	(Points)
- Abertillery
–	Newport		
International career
Years	Team	Apps	(Points)
1966-67	Wales	6	(0)
1966	British Lions	0	(0)

Robert Allan Lewis (born 7 October 1942) is a former Wales international rugby union player.

He was capped six times by Wales as a scrum-half between 1966 and 1967.

He was selected for the 1966 British Lions tour to Australia and New Zealand, and played in the last three internationals against the All Blacks. He also toured South Africa with Wales in 1964.

He played club rugby for Abertillery and Newport.
