= Jake Blackmore =

Wales dual-code international rugby footballer

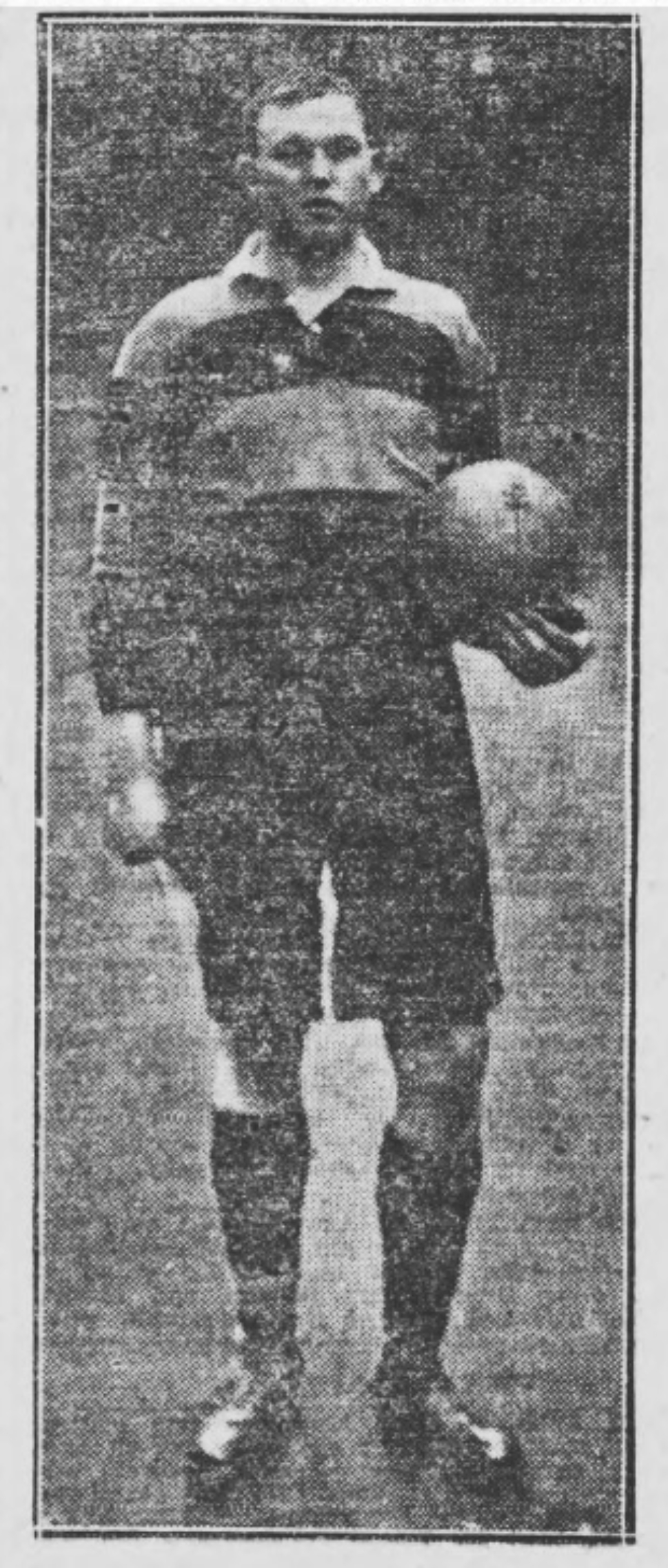
- Blackmore in 1909
- Born: Joseph Henry Blackmore; 10 March 1883 Abertillery, Monmouthshire, Wales
- Died: 26 March 1964 (aged 81) Aberbeeg, Wales

Rugby union career
- Position: Forward
Amateur team(s)
Years	Team	Apps	(Points)
1902-10	Abertillery RFC		
–	Tredegar RFC		
–	Blaina RFC		
Provincial / State sides
Years	Team	Apps	(Points)
1906	Monmouthshire County RFC		
International career
Years	Team	Apps	(Points)
1909	Wales	1	(0)
- Rugby league career

Playing information
- Position: Forward
Club
Years	Team	Pld	T	G	FG	P
1910	Hull Kingston Rovers	65				19
Representative
Years	Team	Pld	T	G	FG	P
1910–11	Wales	2				0

Joseph Henry "Jake" Blackmore (10 March 1883 - 26 March 1964) was an international rugby forward who played rugby union for Abertillery and rugby league with Hull Kingston Rovers. He won a single cap for Wales under the rugby union code and then represented his country at rugby league in two matches between 1910 and 1911. Despite winning only one cap, he became a Triple Crown winning player when he played in the opening game of the 1909 Home Nations Championship.

== Rugby career ==
Blackmore first came to note as a rugby player when he joined Abertillery in 1902. Blackmore stayed with Abertillery for the majority of his amateur career, spending just two seasons outside the team when he left after a disagreement with the club. During these two seasons he represented first Tredegar, and then Blaina, before returning to Abertillery. In 1906 Blackmore was chosen to represent Monmouthshire county, and was part of the team that faced the South African national team on their first overseas tour. In 1907, Blackmore faced his second national team, this time the first touring Australian team, but on this occasion with his club side Abertillery. This was the first national team to visit Abertillery Park, and Blackmore was part of the team to force the Australians to a 3-3 draw.

In 1909 Blackmore won his first full test cap when he was selected for the Wales team to face England in the opening game of the 1909 Home Nations Championship. Played at the Cardiff Arms Park, Blackmore was the only new cap into the team, and joined Abertillery teammate, Jim Webb in the pack. The game ended in a Welsh victory, and although Blackmore played no further part in the campaign, he became a Triple Crown winning player after Wales won the remaining two games of the competition.

In 1910, Blackmore decided to turn professional, and left Abertillery to join English rugby league team, Hull Kingston Rovers. He played his first game for Hull Kingston Rovers on 3 September 1910, facing Dewsbury. Three months later, on 10 December, Blackmore was selected for the Wales rugby league team, in a game against England at Coventry. Wales lost 13-39. Blackmore was reselected for Wales in the next league international, which Wales again lost to England, but this time on Welsh soil at Ebbw Vale. Jake Blackmore played as a forward in Hull Kingston Rovers' 10-22 defeat by Huddersfield in the 1911–12 Yorkshire Cup Final during the 1911–12 season at Belle Vue, Wakefield on Saturday 25 November 1911, in front of a crowd of 20,000.

=== International matches played ===
Wales (rugby union)

- England 1909

Wales (rugby league)

- England 1910, 1911

== Bibliography ==
- Billot, John (1974). Springboks in Wales. Ferndale, Glamorgan: Ron Jones Publications.
- Gate, Robert (1986). Gone North: Volume 1. Ripponden: R.E. Gate. ISBN 0-9511190-0-1.
- Godwin, Terry (1984). The International Rugby Championship 1883-1983. Grafton Street, London: Willow Books. ISBN 0-00-218060-X.
- Jenkins, John M.; et al. (1991). Who's Who of Welsh International Rugby Players. Wrexham: Bridge Books. ISBN 1-872424-10-4.
- Smith, David; Williams, Gareth (1980). Fields of Praise: The Official History of The Welsh Rugby Union. Cardiff: University of Wales Press. ISBN 0-7083-0766-3.
- Thomas, Irene; Thomas, Keith (1983). Abertillery Rugby Football Club 1883-1983. Barry: Stewart Williams. ISBN 0-900807-57-1.
