= Lonza Bowdler =

Wales international rugby union footballer

Lonza Bowlder
- Born: Frederick Arthur Bowdler; 4 January 1901 Abercarn, Wales
- Died: 17 December 1962 (aged 61) Chepstow, Wales
- Occupation: miner

Rugby union career
- Position: Hooker
Amateur team(s)
Years	Team	Apps	(Points)
–	Cross Keys RFC		
International career
Years	Team	Apps	(Points)
1927–1933	Wales	15	(0)

Frank "Lonza" Bowdler (4 January 1901 – 17 December 1962) was a Welsh rugby union hooker who played club rugby for Cross Keys and was capped 15 times for Wales. A coal miner by profession, Watcyn Thomas remembered him in his autobiography, as a dedicated player, turning out for Wales on Saturday before returning immediately to his shift underground at his mine.

== International rugby career ==
Although Cross Keys was seen as an unfashionable club at the time, it had already produced two respected internationals in Steve Morris and Ossie Male; therefore although unusual, it was not a surprise when Bowdler was selected for the Welsh rugby team. In 1927 Bowdler was selected to face the touring Australian Waratahs and the next year made his debut in the Five Nations Championship in a game against England, which was also the last game for Wales captain Rowe Harding. Bowdler played out the entirety of the 1928 Five Nations Championship and the 1929 season. An unsuccessful period in Welsh rugby, Bowdler played through into the early 1930s when the team's fortunes began changing. He missed the 1931 Five Nations Championship, when Wales actually won the tournament, but was selected to play against the 1931 touring South Africans. His final game was at Ravenhill against Ireland in 1933, when Wales lost the selectors dropped 11 players from the squad. Bowdler was one of them.

== International matches played ==
Wales

- England 1928, 1929, 1930, 1932
- France 1928, 1929
- Ireland 1928, 1929, 1932, 1933
- (Australia) New South Wales Waratahs 1927
- Scotland 1928, 1929, 1932
- South Africa 1931

== Bibliography ==
- Billot, John (1974). Springboks in Wales. Ferndale: Ron Jones Publications.
- Goodwin, Terry (1984). The International Rugby Championship 1883-1983. London: Willows Books. ISBN 0-00-218060-X.
- Smith, David; Williams, Gareth (1980). Fields of Praise: The Official History of The Welsh Rugby Union. Cardiff: University of Wales Press. ISBN 0-7083-0766-3.
- Thomas, Watcyn (1977). Rugby-Playing Man. London: Pelham Books. ISBN 0-7207-0952-0.
