= Fred Reeves =

- Full name: Frederick Charles Reeves
- Born: 12 July 1892 Crosskeys, Wales
- Died: 5 August 1976 (aged 84) Pontywaun, Wales

Rugby union career
- Position: Scrum-half
International career
Years	Team	Apps	(Points)
1920–21	Wales	3	(0)

Frederick Charles Reeves (12 July 1892 – 5 August 1976) was a Welsh international rugby union player.

A miner by profession, Reeves was a resourceful halfback who played his rugby for hometown club Cross Keys. He was capped three times for Wales, debuting in their win over France at Colombes in 1920. His final cap came during the 1921 Five Nations Championship. He took over as captain of Cross Keys in the 1924–25 season.

== See also ==
- List of Wales national rugby union players
