= Alex Walker (rugby union, born 1986) =

Welsh Rugby union player

- Born: 31 July 1986 (age 40) Newport, Wales
- Height: 1.83 m (6 ft 0 in)
- Weight: 92 kg (14 st 7 lb)

Rugby union career
- Position: Scrum-half
Senior career
Years	Team	Apps	(Points)
2006–2010	Newport GD	41	(5)
2008–2010	London Welsh		
2010–2011	Eastwood		
2011–2012	Scarlets		
2012-2014	Cardiff Blues		
2014-2017	Ealing Trailfinders		
2017-2018	London Scottish F.C.		

Alex Walker (born 31 July 1986, Newport) is a former Welsh rugby union player. He is a Wales sevens international.

A scrum-half, Walker played for Newport HSOB and Newport RFC before joining Newport Gwent Dragons. During the 2008–09 season he was loaned to London Welsh. He was released by Newport Gwent Dragons in August 2010 and joined Eastwood Rugby Club in Sydney, Australia. In July 2011 he joined the Scarlets.

He was selected for the Wales Sevens squad for 2012-13

After two years at Cardiff Blues, Walker joined London club Ealing Trailfinders Rugby Club, where he was subsequently named club captain for the 2016-17 Greene King IPA Championship season.

After three years with Ealing, Walker signed for another London club, London Scottish FC, in June 2017 in a part-time professional playing role.

Walker's playing role at London Scottish was combined with a full-time job as a schoolteacher. Walker retired from playing professional rugby in June 2018.

In 2018, Alex Walker hoped that teaching might be a vocation that he could continue after his rugby career had finished. He was in his last year of his degree with the Open University and was aiming to complete his PGCE the following year. In 2019, Walker was a trainee teacher/rugby coach at Belmont Mill Hill Preparatory School in London.

== Personal life ==
Alex Walker also appeared on the Channel 4 residential property search show Location, Location, Location in 2014 (Series 23 Episode 8) and again in early 2016 (Series 26 Episode 6), looking for a home in Ruislip and Hillingdon areas of west London.
