= Clive Burgess =

Wales international rugby union player

- Born: Robert Clive Burgess; 25 November 1950 Manmoel, Caerphilly
- Died: 2 May 2006 (aged 55) Ebbw Vale, Wales

Rugby union career
- Position(s): Number 8, Flanker
Amateur team(s)
Years	Team	Apps	(Points)
- Croesyceiliog RFC
–	Ebbw Vale RFC		
International career
Years	Team	Apps	(Points)
1977-1982	Wales	9	(4)

Robert Clive Burgess (25 November 1950 – 2 May 2006) was an international rugby union flanker who played for Wales from 1977 to 1982. Burgess was a popular player who had many nicknames some of which were Budgie, Animal and The Steel Claw thanks to his fearless nature and rugged appearance. He played his club rugby for Ebbw Vale RFC, Croesyceiliog RFC and Brescia Rugby

Burgess is unusual as he first started playing rugby at the age of 20 after leaving the Merchant Navy. This did not prevent him from being capped for the Wales B team against France in 1976 and his first full cap came in a try-scoring debut against Ireland in 1977. He was a key member of the 1977 Triple Crown winning side and on his recall from the international wilderness in 1981, was promptly voted Welsh Player of the Year. He was renowned for his mauling strength and won nine caps between 1977 and 1982.

Born in Manmoel on 25 November 1950, Robert Clive Burgess joined Ebbw Vale from Croesyceiliog RFC and was a superb servant to the Eugene Cross Park club, for whom he made more than 200 appearances, before finishing his career in Italy with Brescia.

Former Welsh Rugby Union Chief Executive Steve Lewis said,

Whenever you saw his name on the team sheet you knew you had a chance of winning any game. He was a tower of strength at Ebbw Vale and his mauling capabilities were legendary.

Burgess died in May 2006 leaving behind a widow and two daughters.

== Family ==
His uncle, Ron Burgess was a Wales international footballer.
