= Garndiffaith Viaduct =

Welsh viaduct

Coordinates: 51.7327°N 3.0687°W

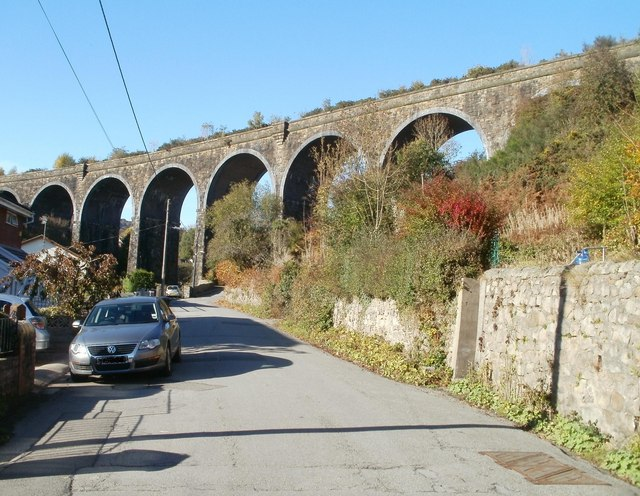
Garndiffaith Viaduct

Garndiffaith Viaduct is a largely stone-built railway viaduct that formerly carried the former Brynmawr and Blaenavon Railway over the valley of the Avon Ffrwd at the lower end of the village of Garndiffaith, Torfaen in South Wales. It is Grade II listed.

The viaduct was engineered by John Gardiner between 1876 and 1877 to extend the LNWR line that principally carried coal from Brynmawr and Blaenavon to meet the Great Western Railway at Abersychan and Talywain.

In 1912 the lines were opened to passenger services operated by the GWR as well as mineral trains, making it easier for miners and other workers to travel up and down the valley. This service ceased in 1941 due to the exigencies of the Second World War, but the viaduct remained in use until 1980 when the last mineral train left Blaenavons' Big Pit mine. The track was shortly dismantled by British Rail thereafter.

== The viaduct today ==
Today the viaduct has survived well into preservation and is in relatively good condition, now forming part of the National Cycle Network Route 46. However, reopening the viaduct to railway traffic has become one of the long-term ambitions of the Pontypool and Blaenavon Railway as the viaduct is wide enough to accommodate route-sharing, in which the preserved P&BR could expand over it alongside the cycle-route.
