= David Weatherley (rugby union) =

- Full name: David Julian Weatherley
- Born: 9 May 1972 (age 54) Swansea, Wales
- Height: 5 ft 9 in (175 cm)
- Weight: 198 lb (90 kg)

Rugby union career
- Position: Centre / Fullback
International career
Years	Team	Apps	(Points)
1998	Wales	1	(0)

David Julian Weatherley (born 9 May 1972) is a Welsh former rugby union international.

Weatherley was born in Swansea and attended Gowerton Comprehensive School.

A utility back, Weatherley started his career at Swansea RFC as a scrum-half but made the most impression after a switch to fullback. It was as a fullback that he won a place on the Wales squad for the 1998 tour of Africa. He earned his first Test cap against Zimbabwe in Harare, only to injure his knee after 30 minutes and be substituted off. The injury ended his tour and he didn't feature again for Wales. He left Swansea for Ebbw Vale RFC in 2001.

== See also ==
- List of Wales national rugby union players
