= 1983 Japan rugby union tour of Wales =

Summary
P	W	D	L
Total
5	2	1	2
Test match
1	0	0	1
Opponent
P	W	D	L
Wales XV
1	0	0	1

The 1983 Japan rugby union tour of Wales was a series of five matches played by the Japan national rugby union team in Wales in October 1983. The Japanese team won two of their matches, drew one and lost the other two. Wales did not award full international caps for their game against Japan.

== Matches ==
Scores and results list Japan's points tally first.

Opponent	For	Against	Date	Venue
Abertillery	17	13	8 October	Abertillery Park, Abertillery
Pembrokeshire	15	28	12 October	Haverfordwest
Neath	21	21	15 October	The Gnoll, Neath
Newbridge	19	14	18 October	Welfare Ground, Newbridge
Wales XV	24	29	22 October	Cardiff Arms Park, Cardiff
