= Newport HSOB RFC =

(Wales) Newport HSOB RFC
- Full name: Newport High School Old Boys Rugby Football Club
- Nickname(s): Old Boys
- Founded: 1923
- Location: Caerleon, Newport
- Ground(s): Yew Tree Lane
- Chairman: Neil Short
- Coach(es): Mike Pugsley
- Captain(s): Niall Martin
- League(s): WRU Division One East
- 2025-26: 4th
Team kit

Newport High School Old Boys (NHSOB) are a Welsh rugby union club based in Caerleon on the northern outskirts of Newport in South Wales. They currently play in the Welsh Rugby Union Division One and is a feeder club for the Newport Gwent Dragons.

Following winning Division 2 East in the 23/24 Season, NHSOB finished 4th in 24/25 Season following their promotion to Division One East, coached by Andrew Screen and Captained by Niall Martin.

Newport HSOB RFC were recognised by the Welsh Rugby Union as the biggest community rugby club in Wales in November 2007. The club provides a full range of teams for all age groups and a full female team at all levels. They have ex-players at all levels of the game. They also provide rugby training for children and adults with learning disabilities. The 'Old Boys' have a close rivalry with nearby rugby club Caerleon R.F.C.

== Early history ==
Newport High School Old Boys Rugby Club has been in existence for nearly 85 years having been founded in the season of 1923/24. Although the present ground at Yew Tree Lane, Caerleon has been the club's home for many years, as a club, it has led a very nomadic existence. During the early years the teams played on pitches at the Royal Oak, Bettws, Ponthir, Llanfrechfa, and the old Caerleon Racecourse. In 1949 a field at the present site at Yew Tree Lane became available for rent and this was to become the club's permanent home.

A major milestone was achieved in 1954 when probationary membership of the Welsh Rugby Union was granted, followed by full WRU membership in 1957. In 1960 the ground and the adjoining land became available for purchase and an area of 10 acres (40,000 m^{2}) was bought for £975. Eventually the land was developed and a new pitch and club house were built and officially opened in 1967. Membership was opened to non Old Boys of Newport High School in the mid sixties and as a result, by the early seventies the club had four senior teams.

== Notable former players ==
See also Category:Newport HSOB RFC players

- David Burcher, Wales and British Lions international
- Jamie Corsi, Wales international
- Mark Davies, Wales international
- Keith Jarrett, Wales and British Lions international
- Ceri Jones, Wales international
- John O'Shea, Wales and British Lions international
- Alix Popham, Wales international
- Matthew Robinson, Wales international
- John Ryan, former Wales national team head coach
- (Wales) Ashley Smith
- (Wales) Alex Walker
- David Watkins, Wales and British Lions international
- Stuart Watkins, Wales and British Lions international
- Rio Dyer, Wales international
- Michael Casey, Wales Special Needs Team
