= Richard Rees (rugby union) =

- Full name: Richard Michael Rees
- Born: 21 September 1971 (age 55) Carmarthen, Wales
- Height: 6 ft 0 in (183 cm)
- Weight: 210 lb (95 kg)

Rugby union career
- Position: Wing
International career
Years	Team	Apps	(Points)
1998	Wales	1	(10)

Richard Michael Rees (born 21 September 1971) is a Welsh former rugby union international.

Rees, a Carmarthen-born winger, is a product of hometown club Tumble RFC. He had brief stints at both Neath and Newport early in his career, before moving onto Swansea, where he would play on the wing for seven seasons. After helping Swansea win the 1997–98 Premier Division title, Rees secured a place on the Wales squad for the 1998 tour of Africa. He earned his first and only Wales cap in the match against Zimbabwe in Harare and scored two debut tries, including one with his first touch. In 2003, Rees left Swansea and signed up to play for the Llanelli Scarlets.

== See also ==
- List of Wales national rugby union players
