= Garndiffaith =

Village in Wales

Coordinates: 51°44′06″N 3°03′59″W

Garndiffaith is a village located in Torfaen, south east Wales. It is a small rural area situated between Talywain and Varteg, three miles north of the town of Pontypool and 3.5 miles south of the town of Blaenavon (a World Heritage Site). The village is now part of the Abersychan suburb of Pontypool which also includes Cwmavon, Pentwyn, Talywain, Varteg, and Victoria Village.

Situated near the closed 'British' coal mines and works, the Garndiffaith area is renowned for its agricultural and industrial heritage based on mining of iron and coal. The adjacent former British Coal Corporation land is known as 'The Balance' after the Water Balance winding mechanism.

Garndiffaith has a few small shops, a Public house and a police station. Garnteg has been the local primary school since it was opened in 1995, when Varteg and Garndiffaith primary schools merged. Garndiffaith primary was later demolished and a new community hall was opened on the site.

Garndiffaith RFC is a long established rugby union club currently playing in the Welsh Rugby Union League 1 East. A history group has recently been set up to research the history of the club and a local community website has been set up to cover the area.

== See also ==
- Garndiffaith RFC
- Garndiffaith Viaduct
- Garndiffaith railway station
