= Croesyceiliog RFC =

Welsh rugby union club, based in Croesyceiliog

(Wales) Croesyceiliog RFC
- Full name: Croesyceiliog Rugby Football Club
- Nickname: Cockerels
- Founded: 1881
- Location: Croesyceiliog, Wales
- Ground: Woodland Road
- Chairman: Alan Hiatt
- League: WRU Division 2 East
- 2016/17: 1st
Team kit

Official website
- www.croesyceiliogrfc.co.uk

Croesyceiliog Rugby Football Club is a Welsh rugby union team based in Croesyceiliog. Today, Croesyceiliog RFC plays in the Welsh Rugby Union Division One East league and are a feeder club for Newport Gwent Dragons.

== History ==
Croesyceiliog RFC was founded in 1881 and the first known Club Captain was one G. Morgan who led the side in the 1883/84 season. The side are known locally as the Cockerels, and a Cockerel is depicted on the club's crest. The club has played at several locations during their long history including at one point in a farm-field owned by Jack Walker, a former player, chairman and president of the club. Since the 1960s Torfaen Borough Council have allowed Croesyceiliog RFC to use the facilities at Woodland Road.

During 1975, under the chairmanship of Mr Jack Walker, the Rugby Club amalgamated with Croesyceiliog Cricket Club, and established headquarters at the cricket ground. In 1976, the club applied for, and was granted membership of the Welsh Rugby Union.

== Club honours ==
- 1998/99 - WRU Division Five East Champions
- 2000/01 - WRU Division Four East Champions
- 2015/16 - Ben Francis Cup Winners
- 2016/17 - WRU Division Two East Champions
- 2014/15 - World Record Longest Drop Goal - Luke Brown

== Notable former players ==
- (Wales) Clive Burgess (9 caps)
- (Wales) Lewk Loder (99 caps)
