= William Evans (rugby, born 1883) =

Wales international rugby union footballer

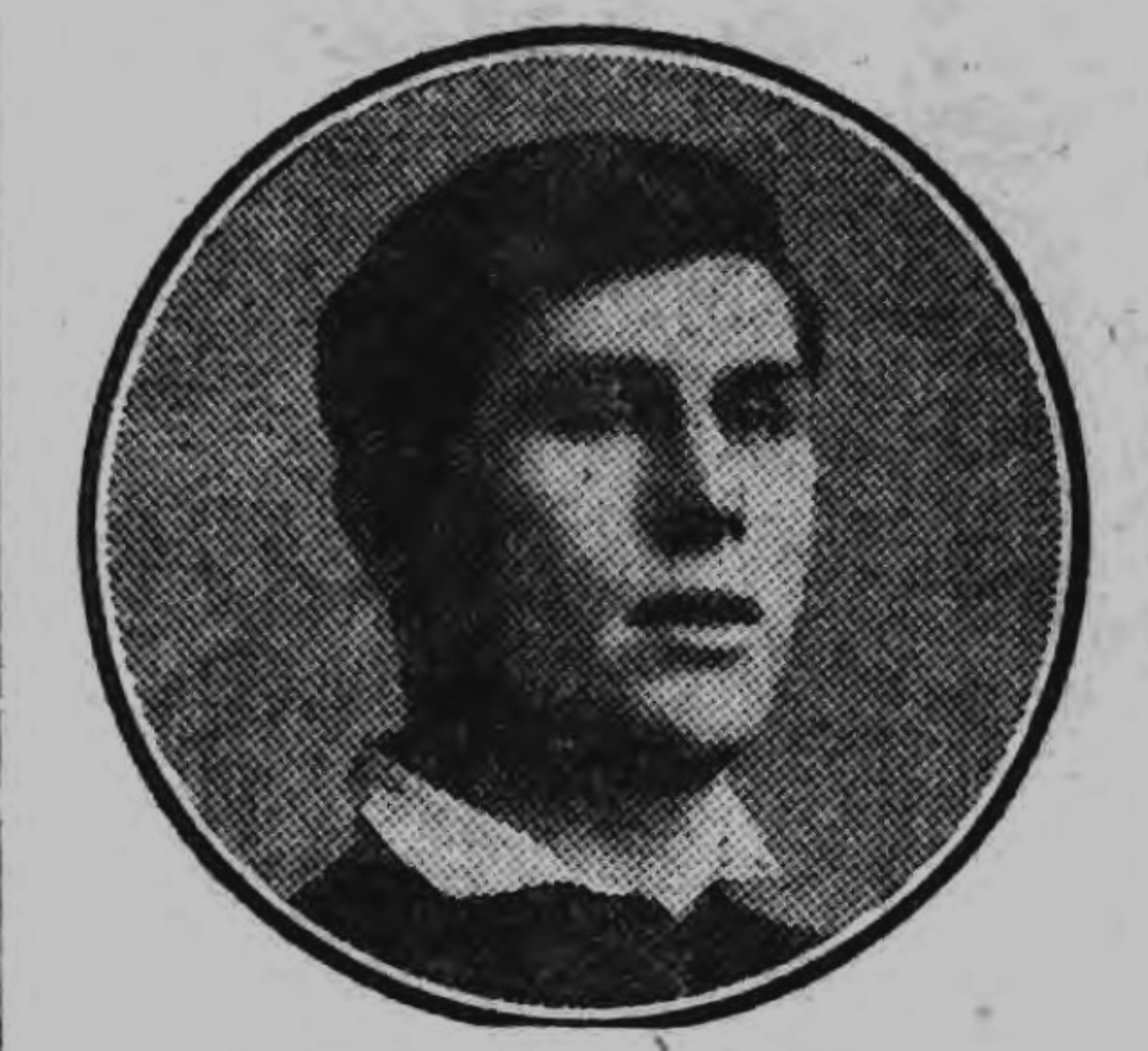
- Born: William George Evans; 23 March 1883 Nantyglo, Wales
- Died: 23 January 1946 (aged 62) Port Talbot, Wales

Rugby union career
- Position: Forward
International career
Years	Team	Apps	(Points)
1911	Wales	1	(0)

William George Evans (23 March 1883 – 23 January 1946) was a Welsh international rugby union and rugby league forward who won one cap for the Wales national rugby union team and two caps for the Wales national rugby league team. He turned professional on 1911, signing for Leeds from Brynmawr RFC.

His one appearance for Wales came in a Five Nations game against Ireland on 11 March 1911 in Cardiff, a match that Wales won 16–0.
