= Graham Jones (rugby union) =

Wales international rugby union player (1933–2022)

- Born: 24 November 1933 Garndiffaith, Wales
- Died: 1 July 2022 (aged 88)
- School: Abersychan Technical School

Rugby union career
- Position: Flanker
International career
Years	Team	Apps	(Points)
1963	Wales	3	(3)

Graham Jones (24 November 1933 — 1 July 2022) was a Welsh international rugby union player.

A native of Garndiffaith, Jones was educated at Abersychan Technical School and undertook National Service with the Royal Air Force (RAF). He became a back row forward during his time in the RAF, having previously played centre for Pontypool. In the 1960s, Jones played his rugby with Ebbw Vale and had a run of 150 consecutive matches.

Jones won three Wales caps in 1963, debuting against Scotland at Murrayfield. He scored what was at the time the quickest known try by a Wales player in his next match, against Ireland at Lansdowne Road, that remains the fastest try by a Welsh forward. It also made him the first Ebbw Vale recruit to score a try for Wales.

== See also ==
- List of Wales national rugby union players
