= Mark Jones (rugby, born 1965) =

GB & Wales rugby footballer (1965–2025)

- Born: 22 June 1965 Tredegar, Wales
- Died: 22 May 2025 (aged 59) Al Khor, Qatar
- Height: 1.97 m (6 ft 6 in)
- Weight: 104 kg (16 st 5 lb)
- School: Tredegar Comprehensive

Rugby union career
- Position: Back row
Senior career
Years	Team	Apps	(Points)
- Tredegar RFC
- Tredegar Ironsides RFC
1990	Neath RFC		
1996	Ebbw Vale RFC		
- Pontypool RFC
2001-03	Aberavon RFC		
International career
Years	Team	Apps	(Points)
1987–98	Wales	15	(8)
- Rugby league career

Playing information
- Position: Prop, Second-row
Club
Years	Team	Pld	T	G	FG	P
1991–95	Hull FC	57	5			20
1995–96	Warrington	38	2			8
	Total	95	7	0	0	28
Representative
Years	Team	Pld	T	G	FG	P
1991–96	Wales	9	1			4
1992	Great Britain	1				0

Mark Alun Jones (22 June 1965 – 22 May 2025) was a Welsh dual-code international professional rugby union and rugby league rugby player who played in the 1980s and 1990s. He played representative level rugby union for Wales, and at club level for Tredegar RFC, Tredegar Ironsides RFC, Neath RFC, Ebbw Vale RFC, Pontypool RFC (2001–03), Aberavon RFC, as a flanker, or number eight, and representative level rugby league (RL) for Great Britain and Wales, and at club level for Hull FC and Warrington, as a prop or second-row.

== Background ==
Mark Jones was born in Tredegar, Wales. He signed for Hull FC from Neath RFC in October 1990 in a five-year deal worth about £120,000. He signed for Warrington from Hull F.C. on 3 July 1995. He was sold to Ebbw Vale RFC for a nominal fee in September 1996.

Jones retired in 2005 and relocated to Al Khor, Qatar. He worked as a laboratory technician at Al Khor International School.

Jones died from a heart attack on 22 May 2025 while training in a gym in Al Khor, Qatar. He was 59.

== International honours ==
Mark Jones won caps for Wales (RU) while at Neath in 1987 against Scotland, in 1988 against New Zealand (interchange/substitute), in 1989 against Scotland, Ireland, France, England, and New Zealand, in 1990 against France, England, Scotland, Ireland, and Namibia (2 matches), and while at Warrington in 1998 against Zimbabwe, won caps for Wales (RL) while at Hull in 1991 against Papua New Guinea, in 1992 against France, and England, in 1993 against New Zealand, in 1994 against France, and while at Warrington in 1995 against USA (two spells), in the 1995 Rugby League World Cup against France (interchange/substitute), and England (interchange/substitute), in 1996 against France, and England, and won a cap for Great Britain (RL) while at Hull in 1992 against France (interchange/substitute).
