= Stanley Winmill =

Wales international rugby union footballer

- Born: Stanley Winmill; 5 May 1889 Bedwellty, Wales
- Died: 25 June 1940 (aged 51) Caerleon, Wales
- Occupation(s): collier policeman

Rugby union career
- Position: Prop
Amateur team(s)
Years	Team	Apps	(Points)
<1912 - 1922>	Cross Keys RFC		
–	Monmouthshire		
International career
Years	Team	Apps	(Points)
1921	Wales	4	(0)

Stanley "Docker" Winmill (5 May 1889 – 25 June 1940) was a Welsh international rugby union player who played club rugby for Cross Keys and county rugby for Monmouthshire. He won four caps for Wales, playing in all four matches of the 1921 Five Nations Championship.

== Rugby career ==
Winmill was a one club player, remaining with Cross Keys for his entire career. He captained the club on two occasions, in 1912-13 and for a three-year period between 1919-1922. His brother Joe was a notable player for Abertillery and both brothers were selected to play at county level for Monmouthshire. Winmill surpassed his brother Joseph in 1921 when he was selected for international duty, brought into the Wales team for the 1921 Five Nations Championship. His first match was against England at Twickenham, brought into the front row. The game ended in a solid win for England, Wales losing 18-3. His next match, at home against Scotland, also ended in a loss. Despite two losses on a run the Welsh selectors kept faith with Winmill and the final two matches of the tournament, at home to France and away to Ireland, both ended in Welsh victories.

=== International matches played ===
Wales

- England 1921
- France 1921
- Ireland 1921
- Scotland 1921

== Personal life ==
Winmill was born in Bedwellty in Monmouthshire. A collier by trade, he worked down the Nine Mile Point Colliery and in 1935 he was one of the 164 men who took part in the stay-down strike against scab labour. As a collier he lost an eye in an industrial accident, and later became a police officer working at his old colliery. In 1940 he tripped over a rail at the mine and injured his head in the fall, dying from the wound on 25 June.

== Bibliography ==
- Smith, David; Williams, Gareth (1980). Fields of Praise: The Official History of The Welsh Rugby Union. Cardiff: University of Wales Press. ISBN 0-7083-0766-3.
