= Ossie Male =

Wales international rugby union player (1893–1975)

- Born: Benjamin Oswald Male; 31 December 1893 Newport, Monmouthshire
- Died: 23 February 1975 (aged 81)
- Occupation: teacher

Rugby union career
- Position: Full Back
Amateur team(s)
Years	Team	Apps	(Points)
–	Cross Keys RFC		
–	Pontypool RFC		
–	Cardiff RFC		
International career
Years	Team	Apps	(Points)
1921–1928	Wales	11	(15)

Ossie Male (31 December 1893 – 23 February 1975) was a Welsh international full back who played club rugby for Cardiff and was capped 11 times for Wales and captained his country on three occasions. In 1924, Male was at the centre of an embarrassing decision made by the Welsh Rugby Union that prevented him facing the French rugby team. Male was one of six siblings and was the youngest boy.

== Rugby career ==
When Male was first capped for his country, he was playing for Cross Keys. He turned out in the Welsh side that beat France at the Cardiff Arms Park on 26 February 1921, but the presence of Swansea's Joe Rees and Mountain Ash's Fred Samuel kept him out of the Wales team until 1923. Male was chosen for one game in the 1923 Five Nations Championship while at Pontypool and after moving to Cardiff, two games in the 1924 tournament; including the disastrous 1924 game against Scotland. Even though Male scored two conversions in the match, Wales were overrun as Scotland scored eight tries.

In 1924, Male was travelling by train with the Welsh team to the final game of that year's Five Nations Championship in France. The Welsh Rugby Union selection committee, also on board, announced that they had suspended Male as he had broken WRU rules by playing Cardiff within six days of the international game so Male left the party at Paddington Station. The timing of the dismissal was criticised, as the players were already on the way to the game. The team was forced to play out of position, with Penarth's Mel Rosser moved to full back and Swansea's Joe Jones to three-quarters.

In 1927, Male was back in the Welsh squad after Tommy Rees of London Welsh broke his leg at the end of the previous year. Male played the entire 1927 Five Nations Championship, captaining Wales against Scotland, and in 1928, although missing the England game, he was back for the final three games of the tournament captaining Wales in two of the games. The final game was against France, and Wales lost against the French for the first time in their history, despite France being without Andre Camel for three quarters of the game. Male never played for Wales again.

== International matches played ==
Wales

- England 1927
- France 1921, 1927, 1928
- Ireland 1924, 1927, 1928
- Scotland 1923, 1924, 1927, 1928

== Family ==
Male was one of six siblings and was the youngest boy. He married his wife, Muriel Male at a young age. The couple had only one daughter, Muriel Patricia Male (Pat) in late October 1928. Patricia went on to become a teacher, and later married Frank Emery (1930–1987), fellow professor and author of The Red Soldier. The couple had two daughters, Susan Elisabeth Emery (1961) and Caroline Mary Emery (1966).

== Bibliography ==
- Billot, John (1974). Springboks in Wales. Ferndale: Ron Jones Publications.
- Goodwin, Terry (1984). The International Rugby Championship 1883-1983. London: Willows Books. ISBN 0-00-218060-X.
- Smith, David; Williams, Gareth (1980). Fields of Praise: The Official History of The Welsh Rugby Union. Cardiff: University of Wales Press. ISBN 0-7083-0766-3.
