= Cwmbran RFC =

Welsh rugby union club, based in Cwmbran

(Wales) Cwmbran RFC
- Full name: Cwmbran Rugby Football Club
- Nickname: The Crows
- Founded: 1880; 146 years ago
- Location: Cwmbran, Wales
- Ground: The Kings Head Ground (Capacity: 634)
- President: Daniel Evans
- Coach(es): Darren Colcombe, Gareth Davies
- League: WRU Division Two East
- 2024/25: 4th WRU Division 2 East
Team kit

Official website
- cwmbran.rfc.wales

Cwmbran Rugby Football Club is a rugby union team from the town of Cwmbran in South Wales. Cwmbran RFC plays in the Welsh Rugby Union Division Two East League and is a feeder club for the Newport Gwent Dragons.

The club badge of Cwmbran RFC depicts a shield with a crow within it, reflecting Cwmbran's translation as 'valley of the crow'.

Several international rugby players, including Mark Brown, Ian Gough and Ryan Powell, started their rugby careers at Cwmbran RFC. Cwmbran RFC was established as a community team with a mini, junior, and youth section.
