= Brynmawr RFC =

- Full name: Brynmawr Rugby Football Club
- Nickname(s): The Pirates
- Location: Brynmawr, Wales
- Ground(s): The rec (Capacity: Leigh 'Tinker' Taylor)
- President: Rob Kershaw
- Coach(es): Gavin Knapp, Sean Emery
- League(s): WRU Division One East
- 2015/16: 3rd
Team kit

Official website
- brynmawrrfc.mywru.co.uk

Brynmawr Rugby Football Club are a Welsh rugby union club based in Brynmawr in South Wales. The club presently plays in the Welsh Rugby Union Division One East league and is a feeder club for the Newport Gwent Dragons.

In 2002 Brynmawr RFC, along with Abertillery RFC, withdrew from the Principality Cup, after the Welsh Rugby Union made an error during the live draw for the fifth round. In 2013 Brynmawr were able to field an Under 13s team. That team stayed together through the remaining years of Junior Rugby and on 30 April 2017 they won the famous Provins International Tournament in France - the first Welsh Team to lift the trophy. They went through the tournament without conceding a point.

== Club honours ==
- 1994–95 Welsh League Division 7 East - Champions
- 2007–08 WRU Division Three East - Champions
- 2023-24 WRU Division One East - Champions

== Notable players ==
See also Category:Brynmawr RFC players

- William Evans
- Roy Francis
- Damien Hudd
- Sam Cross
- Stupid Lee
- Big Rick the 80 minute man
