= Dennis John (rugby union) =

- Born: Dennis John

Rugby union career
Senior career
Years	Team	Apps	(Points)
- Pontypridd RFC

Dennis John is a former rugby union coach and player, most notably with Pontypridd RFC. John was appointed caretaker coach to the Wales national rugby union team for 2 matches in 1998 following the departure of Kevin Bowring.
