= Tredegar RFC =

Welsh rugby union club, based in Tredegar

(Wales) Tredegar RFC
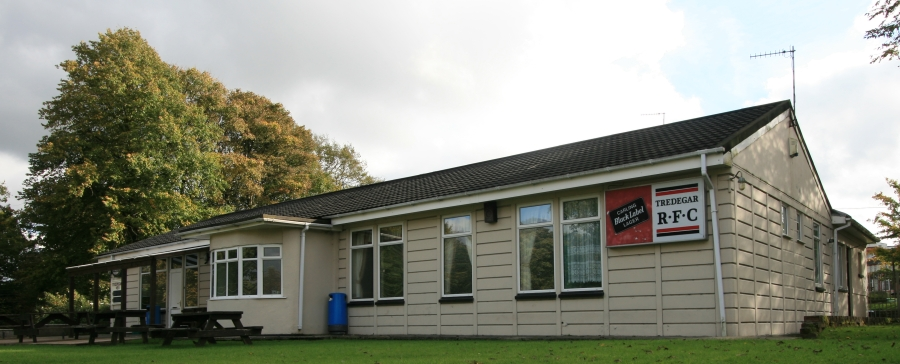
- Full name: Tredegar Rugby Football Club
- Founded: 1899; 127 years ago
- Location: Tredegar, Wales
- Ground: The Recreation Ground
- Coach(es): Nolan Nicklin, Lloyd Williams
- Captain: Craig Lewis
- League: WRU Division Two East 3c
- 12th WRU Division One East
Team kit

Official website
- www.tredegar-rfc.co.uk
- Current season

Tredegar Rugby Football Club is a Welsh rugby union team based in Tredegar. The club was founded in 1893 but at that time played under the name Tredegar Harriers. The club is a member of the Welsh Rugby Union and is a feeder club for the Newport Gwent Dragons.

== Tredegar Harriers ==
Tredegar RFC was founded by Jim Davies. When he was 16 years old, in 1893, he helped found Tredegar Harriers, the forerunner of Tredegar and in 1958 he raised the Tredegar R.F.C standard to the masthead over their headquarters. In the days of the depression, Jim Davies often had to pay for the players' coach himself; once he had to pay out on the spot before the coach driver would move. Jim Davies was almost 50 when he played his last game for the club; his eldest son, Jim, played in the same match.

When the Harriers stopped playing, Jim Davies joined Dowlais RFC who were so pleased at getting his services that they provided him with a coach to get him to and from their games. When Dowlais disbanded, the club sold their jerseys to Tredegar and the black, red and white strip has been Tredegar's colours ever since.

== 1899–1939 ==
In 1899 the Recreation Ground was opened and Jim Davies and other members of the old Harriers side got together to form the official town team. It had taken volunteers two years to transform the ground into a suitable sports site; built over two disused and filled-in pit shafts. Tredegar helped form the Monmouthshire League and became members of Monmouthshire County R.F.C., of which Jim Davies was one of the founders. Early Tredegar players of note were Jim Hares, Will Evans, Ernie Bird, Enoch Hughes and Jim Davies, but probably their finest product was Percy Jones, who won eight caps for Wales after he moved to Newport and was a member of Wales' "Terrible Eight" pack against Ireland in 1914. Percy Jones was a forward of tremendous physical physique and he was reputed to have the thickest legs in Monmouthshire; so huge, that he had to have special rugby socks knitted for him as none of the standard sizes fitted.

In 1919 Tredegar lost 8–0 to the New Zealand Army team, as part of their post-war tour of Britain.

== 1939–present ==
Though Tredegar never won the Monmouthshire League before 1939, they claimed the runners-up spot. In those days, trainloads of supporters always traveled away with the Tredegar team. Once, in Bristol, they booked the entire seating capacity of the Bristol pantomime: two full trainloads made the journey. After the war, Tredegar's outstanding players were Dai John Vaughan, the flying wing, Steve Barr, rated one of the best uncapped fullbacks in Wales and the Davies brothers Edgar, Ivor and Jack. It was not until after the Second World War that Tredegar won the Monmouthshire League in 1951. In the early 1950s they obtained permission to use the complete armorial bearings of Lord Tredegar as the club badge.

In 1950, the only leading Welsh clubs on Tredegar's fixture list were Ebbw Vale and Glamorgan Wanderers. The list has expanded now to include Pontypool, Llanelli, Pontypridd, Newbridge and Maesteg, through their ambition of including Cardiff remains unfulfilled. Quality players of recent years include Wales B lock John Williams, who finished his career with Swansea, John Dixon, Sid Wharton, Stuart Stupid Lee, Ian Lewis, Peter Bolland, Paul Evans, Howard Dwyer, Steve Giles and Nicky Hunt.

== Club honours ==
- 2008–09 WRU Division Two East – Champions
- 2016-17 Promotion East 3D

== Notable former players ==
The following players have represented Tredegar and have also been capped at international level.

- (Wales) Jake Blackmore
- (Wales) Glyn Davidge
- (Wales) William "Will" T. Davies
- (Wales) Damien Hudd
- (Wales) Brian Jones
- (Wales) Jack 'Bedwellty' Jones
- (Wales) Mark Jones
- (Wales) Percy Jones
- (Wales) Mike Ruddock
- (Wales) Phil Thomas
- (Wales) Harry Uzzell
- (Wales) Paul Woods
- (Wales) Mark Ring
- (Wales) Ellis Genge
- (Wales) Gareth 'Gatchy' Davies
