= Pontypool United RFC =

(Wales) Pontypool United RFC
- Full name: Pontypool United Rugby Football Club
- Nickname: United
- Location: Pontypool, Wales
- Ground: Memorial Ground
- President: Adrian Waters
- Coach: Jamie Jeune
- Captain: Ethan Davies
- League: WRU Division Two East
- 2011-12
Team kit

Pontypool United Rugby Football Club are a Welsh rugby union club based in Pontypool South Wales. The club is a member of the Welsh Rugby Union and is a feeder club for the Dragons regional team, currently playing in the Welsh Rugby Union Division 1 East and Challenge Cup.

Pontypool United are a separate team from Pontypool RFC who play in the Indigo Premiership , but the two clubs are classed as neighboring clubs within Pontypool town. Pontypool United have been known to develop future Pontypool RFC players through the clubs Colts, Youth and Senior squads.

== Notable past players ==
See also Category:Pontypool United RFC players

- (Wales) Graham Price
- (Wales) Lloyd Burns
- (Wales) Ashley Sweet
