= Ebbw Vale RFC =

Welsh rugby union club, based in Ebbw Vale

- Full name: Ebbw Vale Rugby Football Club
- Nickname: The Steelmen
- Founded: 1879
- Location: Ebbw Vale, Wales
- Ground: Ciner Glass Community Stadium (Capacity: 8,000)
- Coach: Jason Strange
- Captain: Joe Franchi
- League: Super Rygbi Cymru
- 2024-2025: Super Rygbi Cymru, 2nd
1st kit	2nd kit

Official website
- www.evrfc.co.uk

Ebbw Vale Rugby Football Club (Welsh: Clwb Rygbi Glyn Ebwy) is a Welsh Rugby Union Club based in the town of Ebbw Vale, Blaenau Gwent, South Wales.

The club play in the Super Rygbi Cymru and act as a feeder club for the Dragons regional team.

== History ==
Evidence of rugby union being played in Ebbw Vale is noted around 1879. Ebbw Vale RFC applied for and achieved Welsh Rugby Union (then known as the Welsh Football Union) membership between 1893 and 1894.

In 1907, the committee of Ebbw Vale rugby club voted 63–20 to switch from amateur rugby union to professional rugby league. Deals were made with the Northern Union, and on 26 July 1907 Ebbw Vale RFC became Ebbw Vale RLFC. The club, its players and members were all suspended from rugby union activities by the Welsh Rugby Union, though after Ebbw Vale RLFC collapsed in 1912, Ebbw Vale were readmitted as a union team after World War I.

In 1927 due to falling gate receipts, caused by the increasing attraction of rival sports such as football, Ebbw Vale staged a rugby league game on their pitch, the Welfare Ground. The WRU reacted strongly and threatened Ebbw Vale RFC with expulsion from the league. This was seen by many as an overly aggressive stance to a club that was desperate for aid not sanctions. By 1932 the gate at Ebbw Vale rarely reached twenty shillings, despite a catchment area population of 40,000. The club was forced to resort to public subscriptions.

Rugby union continued in Ebbw Vale during World War II due to the vital services provided by the steel and coal industry and Ebbw Vale was undefeated in 1940/1941. But by the mid-1950s Ebbw Vale RFC was once again becoming a prosperous club. Although seen as one of the most successful clubs on and off the playing field throughout the 1950s, Ebbw Vale was under-represented in the Welsh national team. Around the same time joint teams drawn from Ebbw Vale and neighbours Abertillery played New Zealand, Australia and South Africa international touring sides. These games were usually close encounters but with only one win – against Australia in 1958. In the 60/61 season the Athletic side, captained by Ken Cameron, lost only one game. Their players were a consistent source of supply to the 1st XV. The club has the dubious distinction of being on the receiving end of the heaviest defeat in Heineken Cup history going down 108–16 away to Toulouse in 1998 conceding 16 tries in the process. Although Ebbw Vale did have revenge, defeating Toulouse in the return fixture.

In April 2010 the club's relegation to WRU Division One East was confirmed.

In April 2011 Ebbw Vale were crowned WRU Division One East Champions after gaining a bonus point win in their final league game at Bedlinog. In what was a remarkable run-in to the end of the season, Ebbw picked up 44 league points from their final 9 league games (out of a possible 45) to overhaul Newbridge and win the league title at the first attempt.

In April 2012 Ebbw Vale retained the WRU Division One East title with one game in hand, following a 52–0 victory over Tredegar. The season was also marked by a remarkable cup run which saw them defeat Newport, Carmerthen Quins and Swansea, before drawing 19–19 to Cross Keys in the semi-final (Cross Keys subsequently progressed by virtue of tries scored 2–1).

In April 2013 Ebbw Vale were crowned inaugural champions of the newly formed WRU National Championship, pitting the best teams from east and west against one another. In a season that marked the club's third league title win in a row the Steelmen won 23 of 24 league games, breaking the 1000 point barrier in the process.

In April 2014 Ebbw Vale were again crowned champions of the WRU National Championship, this time gaining promotion to the Principality Premiership. They won 25 out of 26 games and amassed another 1000 point season.

In the 2015/16 season the club achieved a new height, winning the Premiership title for the first time.

== Colours and badge ==
The club colours changed from black and amber to red, white and green in the 1930s. The change may have been made by Dai Regan Jones, who had played for Leicester RFC.

Their home colours of green, white and red represent the colours of the Welsh national flag with the second-choice shirt coloured light blue. The club's badge like many other clubs in Wales has a red dragon on it. The dragon is standing over a golden gate or drawbridge, over the dragons head is a semicircle with the club's motto of Iach Gorff Iach Meddwl. This semicircle is part of a bridge shape which is coloured in the club's and Welsh colours of red, green and white. All of this is incorporated into a shield shape with the club's name Ebbw Vale RFC embroidered on the bottom.

== Club's motto ==
The club's motto is "Iach Gorff Iach Feddwl", the Welsh for "Healthy Body Healthy Mind". The origin of this motto is speculative but this is an old proverb in the Welsh Language.

== Club honours ==
- Unofficial Welsh Club Champions 1952, 1954, 1957, 1960.
- Snelling Sevens 1958 – Champions
- Welsh Cup Runners-up 1998–99
- WRU Division One East 2010–11 – Champions
- WRU Division One East 2011–12 – Champions
- WRU Championship 2012–13 – Champions
- WRU Championship 2013–14 – Champions
- Principality Premiership 2015–16 – Champions

== Notable former players ==
The players listed below have played or coached rugby union or rugby league at international level and have represented or coached Ebbw Vale.

See also Category:Ebbw Vale RFC players

Nationality	Name	Caps
(Wales)	Allan Bateman	35 International
(England)	Duncan Bell	5 International
(Wales)	Nathan Budgett	12 International
(Wales)	Clive Burgess	9 International
(Wales)	Richie Collins	28 International
(Ireland)	Guy Easterby	28 international
(Tonga)	Kuli Faletau	20 international
(Wales)	John Funnell	2 international
(Wales)	Byron Hayward	2 International
(England)	Simon Hunt	0 International
(Wales)	Deiniol Jones	13 International
(Wales)	Graham Jones	3 International
(Wales)	Kingsley Jones	10 International
(Wales)	Glyn Turner	2 international

Nationality	Name	Caps
(Wales)	Mark Jones	15 international
(Wales)	Arthur Lewis	11 International
(Wales)	Dan Lydiate	27 International
(Wales)	David Nash	6 International
(Wales)	Graham Powell	2 International
(Wales)	Paul Ringer	8 International
(Scotland)	Arthur Smith	33 International
(Wales)	Richard Smith	1 International
(Wales)	Iestyn Thomas	33 International
(Wales)	Paul Thorburn	37 International
(Tonga)	Josh Taumalolo	31 International
(Wales)	Ian Watkins	10 International
(Wales)	Denzil Williams	36 international

== Notable former coaches and management staff ==
Nationality	Name	Role
(England)	Alex Codling	Head and Forwards Coach
(Wales)	Byron Hayward	Head coach
(England)	Richard Hill	Backs Coach
(Wales)	Leigh Jones	Head coach
(Wales)	Lyn Jones	Head coach
(Wales)	Christian Loader	Forwards Coach
(Wales)	Rowland Phillips	Defence/head coach
(Wales)	Mike Ruddock	Head coach

== Games played against international opposition ==
Year	Date	Opponent	Result	Score	Tour
1953^{1}	23 December	New Zealand	Loss	3–22	1953–54 New Zealand rugby union tour of Britain, Ireland, France and North America.
1958^{1}	8 January	Australia	Won	6–5	1957–58 Australia rugby union tour of Britain, Ireland and France
1960^{1}	29 November	South Africa	Loss	0–3	1960–61 South Africa rugby union tour of Europe
1963^{1}	6 November	New Zealand	Loss	0–13	1963–64 New Zealand rugby union tour of Britain, Ireland, France and North America
1979	22 September	Romania	Loss	0–12	1979 Romania rugby union tour of Wales
1987	24 October	United States	Win	16–14	1987 United States rugby union tour of Wales

^{1}A joint Ebbw Vale and Abertillery side.

== Bibliography ==
- Smith, David; Williams, Gareth (1980). Fields of Praise: The Official History of The Welsh Rugby Union. Cardiff: University of Wales Press. ISBN 0-7083-0766-3.
