= Cross Keys RFC =

Welsh rugby union club, based in Crosskeys

(Wales) Cross Keys RFC
- Full name: Cross Keys Rugby Football Club
- Nickname: The Keys
- Founded: 1885; 141 years ago
- Location: Crosskeys, Wales
- Ground: Pandy Park (Capacity: 3,000)
- President: (Wales) Terry Howell
- Coach(es): (Wales) Morgan Stoddart (Wales) Chris James
- Captain: Corey Nicholls
- League: WRU Admiral Premiership
- 2025-26: 10th
Team kit

Official website
- www.crosskeysrfc.com

Cross Keys RFC (Welsh: Clwb Rygbi Pont-y-Cymer) is a rugby union club located in the Welsh village of Crosskeys. The club is a member of the Welsh Rugby Union, and is a feeder club for the Dragons regional team.

== History ==
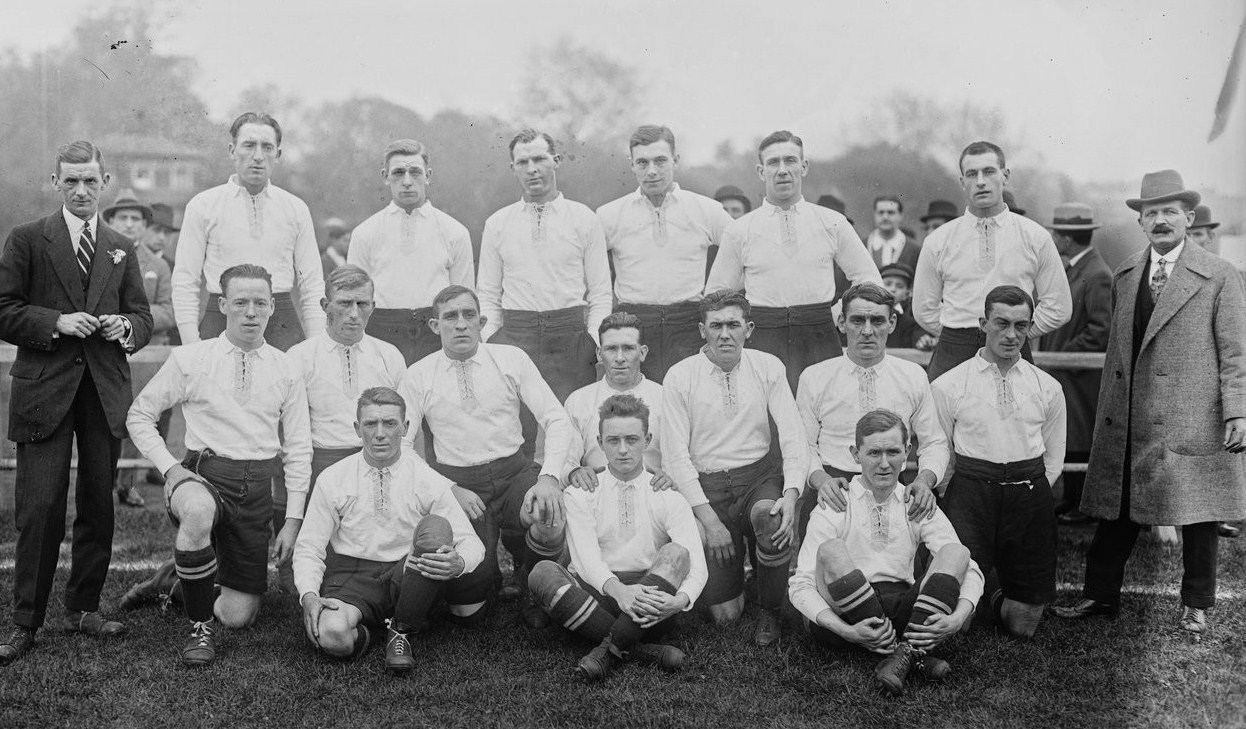
Cross Keys RFC, Stade Bergeyre, France, 1 November 1921

The club achieved first class-status in 1909, winning the Monmouthshire league three times.

By 1920 the team had their first international player, when Steve Morris won a cap for Wales. Morris would win 19 caps and captained Wales in 1925. Caps followed during the 1920s for Ossie Male and Lonza Bowdler, both returned over several seasons for Wales, facing not only Five Nations Championships but also touring teams.

In 1926 Cross Keys RFC found themselves in dire financial trouble, and requested help from the Welsh Rugby Union. The WRU refused an appeal for a cash loan, but instead agreed to send the Welsh national team to play in an exhibition match at Pandy Park. The sell-out crowd assured Cross Keys future and resulted in an historic win for the home team thirteen points to eight.

Rugby observers have noted the high level of talent in the Cross Keys pack, and criticised the fact they went under represented in the national team during the 1920s and 1930s.

Cross Keys reached the final of the 2011–12 British and Irish Cup, losing to Munster A. Cross Keys won their first Swalec Cup, defeating table topping Pontypridd at the Millennium Stadium in 2012.

== Club honours ==
- Welsh Club Champions - 1921–22, 1935–36
- Welsh Division One Champions - 1992–93, 1999–00
- British and Irish Cup Runners-Up - 2011–12
- Swalec Cup Winners - 2011–12
- Swalec Cup Runners-Up - 2013–14
- Welsh Premier Division Runners-Up - 2013–2014
- WRU Admiral Championship East Promotion (3rd) - 2023-24
- Welsh Premiership Cup Runners up - 2024-2025

== Notable former players ==
The following list is made up of ex-Cross Keys players who have all won international caps as either a rugby union or rugby league player.

See also Category:Cross Keys RFC players

- (Wales) George Boots
- Taulupe Faletau 38 Wales caps, 1 British and Irish Lions cap
- (Wales) Frederick Arthur Bowdler (15 caps)
- (Wales) Archibald "Archie" Brown
- (Wales) Lloyd Burns (7 caps)
- (Wales) Mervyn Hicks (Great Britain Rugby League)
- (Wales) Ron Herrera (8 caps)
- (Wales) Jack Hurrell (1 cap)
- (Wales) Ossie Male (11 caps)
- (Wales) Steve Morris (19 caps)
- (Wales) Con Murphy (3 caps)
- (Wales) Gerwyn Price
- (Wales) Dai Rees
- (Wales) Fred Reeves (2 caps)
- (Wales) Rex Richards (1 cap)
- (Wales) Russell Taylor (3 caps), 1938 British Lions
- Joe Thompson (1 cap) for Wales (RU). Whilst at Leeds (Great Britain RL 12 caps, Wales RL 8 caps, Other Nationalities RL 5 caps)
- (Wales) Trevor Williams (8 caps)
- (Wales) Stanley 'Docker' Winmill (2 caps)

== Games played against international opposition ==
| Year | Date | Opponent | Result | Score | Tour |
|---|---|---|---|---|---|
| 1985 | 9 October | Fiji | Loss | 12-26 | 1985 Fiji rugby union tour of Wales and Ireland |
| 2022 | 2 November | Poland | Loss | 37-12 | 2022 Rugby Europe Championship Preparations |

== Past season performance ==
2006/06-2009/10

| Season | League | Finish | Number of Teams |
|---|---|---|---|
| 2006-07 | Premiership | 13th | 14 |
| 2007-08 | Premiership | 11th | 15 |
| 2008-09 | Premiership | 9th | 14 |
| 2009-10 | Premiership | 10th | 14 |

2010/11-2019/20

| Season | League | Finish | Number of Teams |
|---|---|---|---|
| 2010-11 | Premiership | 6th | 14 |
| 2011-12 | Premiership | 6th | 14 |
| 2012-13 | Premiership | 5th | 12 |
| 2013-14 | Premiership | 3rd | 12 |
| 2014-15 | Premiership | 3rd | 12 |
| 2015-16 | Premiership | 4th | 12 |
| 2016-17 | Premiership | 12th | 16 |
| 2017-18 | Premiership | 11th | 16 |
| 2018-19 | Premiership | 14th | 16 |
| 2019-20 | Championship | 7th | 14 |

2020/21-

| Season | League | Finish | Number of Teams |
|---|---|---|---|
| 2020-21 | COVID-19 | | |
| 2021-22 | Championship | 7th | 14 |
| 2022-23 | Championship | 8th | 14 |
| 2023-24 | Championship East | 3rd | 12 |
| 2024-25 | Premiership | 6th | 13 |
| 2025-26 | Premiership | 10th | 13 |
| 2026-27 | Premiership | | 13 |
| 2027-28 | Premiership | | 13 |
| 2028-29 | Premiership | | 13 |

== Bibliography ==
- Smith, David; Williams, Gareth (1980). Fields of Praise: The Official History of The Welsh Rugby Union. Cardiff: University of Wales Press. ISBN 0-7083-0766-3.
