= 1999 Wales rugby union tour of Argentina =

Summary
| P | W | D | L |
Total
| 5 | 3 | 0 | 2 |
Test match
| 2 | 2 | 0 | 0 |
Opponent
| P | W | D | L |
Argentina
| 2 | 2 | 0 | 0 |

Tour chronology
- ← 1998 Africa 2001 Japan →

The Wales national rugby union team toured Argentina in May–June 1999. They played five matches, including two tests against the Argentina national team. The tour served as preparation for the 1999 Rugby World Cup, which Wales hosted in October and November that year.

Wales won the test series 2–0, winning the first test 36–26 and the second 23–16 to claim their first series victory in the Southern Hemisphere; however, they only won one of their three tour matches, beating Tucumán 69–44 but losing 31–29 to Buenos Aires and 47–34 to Argentina A.

== Squad ==
Wales coach Graham Henry named a squad of 37 for the tour of Argentina, including three uncapped players: scrum-half Rhodri Jones, and back-rowers Richard Arnold and Ian Boobyer. Fly-half Arwel Thomas and lock Andy Moore were recalled to the Wales team after missing the 1999 Five Nations Championship. Henry also named seven standby players, including lock Gareth Llewellyn and full-back Byron Hayward. After injuries to Pontypridd's Ian Gough and Kevin Morgan, Llewellyn and Hayward were called up to the main tour squad. Centre Scott Gibbs was also ruled out after breaking a hand; he was replaced by Newport's Matthew Watkins.

| Name | Position | Club | Notes |
|---|---|---|---|
| Jonathan Humphreys | Hooker | Cardiff | |
| Garin Jenkins | Hooker | Swansea | |
| Chris Anthony | Prop | Swansea | |
| Ben Evans | Prop | Swansea | |
| Andrew Lewis | Prop/Hooker | Cardiff | |
| Darren Morris | Prop | Swansea | |
| Peter Rogers | Prop | London Irish | |
| Dai Young | Prop | Cardiff | |
| Ian Gough | Lock | Pontypridd | Withdrew due to injury |
| Andy Moore | Lock | Swansea | |
| Craig Quinnell | Lock | Richmond | |
| Mike Voyle | Lock | Llanelli | |
| Chris Wyatt | Lock | Llanelli | |
| Richard Arnold | Back row | Newcastle | |
| Ian Boobyer | Back row | Llanelli | |
| Colin Charvis | Back row | Swansea | |
| Geraint Lewis | Back row | Pontypridd | |
| Scott Quinnell | Back row | Llanelli | |
| Brett Sinkinson | Back row | Neath | |
| Martyn Williams | Back row | Pontypridd | |
| Rob Howley | Scrum-half | Cardiff | Captain |
| Rhodri Jones | Scrum-half | Swansea | |
| David Llewellyn | Scrum-half | Ebbw Vale | |
| Neil Jenkins | Fly-half | Pontypridd | |
| Stephen Jones | Fly-half | Llanelli | |
| Arwel Thomas | Fly-half | Swansea | |
| Allan Bateman | Centre | Richmond | |
| Neil Boobyer | Centre | Llanelli | |
| Leigh Davies | Centre | Cardiff | |
| Scott Gibbs | Centre | Swansea | Withdrew due to injury |
| Mark Taylor | Centre | Swansea | |
| Dafydd James | Wing | Pontypridd | |
| Matthew Robinson | Wing | Swansea | |
| Gareth Thomas | Wing | Cardiff | |
| Nick Walne | Wing | Richmond | |
| Shane Howarth | Full-back | Sale | |
| Kevin Morgan | Full-back | Pontypridd | Withdrew due to injury |

Standby squad

| Name | Position | Club | Notes |
|---|---|---|---|
| Phil John | Hooker | Pontypridd | |
| Barry Williams | Hooker | Richmond | |
| John Davies | Prop | Llanelli | |
| Gareth Llewellyn | Lock | Richmond | Injury replacement for Ian Gough |
| Hywel Jenkins | Back row | Llanelli | |
| Matthew Watkins | Centre | Newport | Injury replacement for Scott Gibbs |
| Richard Rees | Wing | Swansea | |
| Byron Hayward | Full-back | Llanelli | Injury replacement for Kevin Morgan |

== Matches ==
| Date | Venue | Home | Score | Away |
|---|---|---|---|---|
| 29 May 1999 | Buenos Aires Cricket & Rugby Club, Buenos Aires | Buenos Aires | 31–29 | Wales |
| 1 June 1999 | Estadio Monumental José Fierro, Tucumán | Tucumán | 44–69 | Wales |
| 5 June 1999 | Ferro Carril Oeste, Buenos Aires | Argentina | 26–36 | Wales |
| 8 June 1999 | Jorge Newbery Municipal Stadium, Rosario | Argentina XV | 47–34 | Wales |
| 12 June 1999 | Ferro Carril Oeste, Buenos Aires | Argentina | 16–23 | Wales |

=== Buenos Aires v Wales ===
Wales named a strong team for the opening match of their tour, and took a 19–14 lead into half-time thanks to a late try from Allan Bateman, converted by Arwel Thomas, who also kicked four penalties in the opening quarter; however, Buenos Aires were still in the game thanks to a try from Rolando Martín and three José Cilley penalties, and they took the lead early in the second half when Octavio Bartolucci crossed for the home side and Cilley added the extras. Wales went back in front thanks to a converted try from Geraint Lewis, but Cilley added another penalty before converting Tomás Solari's try to give Buenos Aires a 31–26 lead as the game entered its final quarter. Thomas pulled the score back to 31–29 three minutes later, but there were no further scores and Wales suffered a shock defeat.

29 May 1999

| Buenos Aires | 31–29 | Wales |
| Try: Martín 17' m Bartolucci 42' c Solari 60' c Con: Cilley (2); Pen: Cilley (4) 7', 23', 29', 53' | Report | Try: Bateman 40' c Lewis 50' c Con: A. Thomas (2); Pen: A. Thomas (5) 4', 10', 15', 20', 63' |

Buenos Aires Cricket & Rugby Club, San Fernando
Referee: Chris White (England)

Team details

| FB | 15 | Diego Albanese |
| RW | 14 | Octavio Bartolucci |
| OC | 13 | José Orengo |
| IC | 12 | Juan Fernández Miranda |
| LW | 11 | Tomás Solari |
| FH | 10 | José Cilley |
| SH | 9 | Nicolás Fernández Miranda (c) |
| N8 | 8 | Pablo Camerlinckx |
| OF | 7 | Lucas Ostiglia |
| BF | 6 | Rolando Martín |
| RL | 5 | Guillermo Ugartemendia |
| LL | 4 | Pedro Sporleder |
| TP | 3 | Martín Scelzo |
| HK | 2 | Mario Ledesma |
| LP | 1 | Fernando Guatieri |
Replacements:
| | 16 |
| | 17 |
| | 18 |
| | 19 |
| | 20 |
| | 21 |
| | 22 |
Coach:
José Javier Fernández

| FB | 15 | Shane Howarth |
| RW | 14 | Gareth Thomas |
| OC | 13 | Allan Bateman |
| IC | 12 | Leigh Davies |
| LW | 11 | Dafydd James |
| FH | 10 | Arwel Thomas |
| SH | 9 | Rob Howley (c) |
| N8 | 8 | Brett Sinkinson |
| OF | 7 | Geraint Lewis |
| BF | 6 | Colin Charvis |
| RL | 5 | Chris Wyatt |
| LL | 4 | Mike Voyle |
| TP | 3 | Peter Rogers |
| HK | 2 | Garin Jenkins |
| LP | 1 | Chris Anthony |
Replacements:
| | 16 |
| | 17 |
| | 18 |
| | 19 |
| | 20 |
| | 21 |
| | 22 |
Coach:
Graham Henry

=== Tucumán v Wales ===
Wales won their first match of the tour in a nine-try performance against Tucumán. Wing Matthew Robinson scored four times, while Mark Taylor and Neil Boobyer claimed two apiece, and Geraint Lewis completed the scoring. Fly-half Arwel Thomas was almost perfect from the tee, converting all nine tries and kicking two out of three penalty attempts for a total of 24 out of Wales's 69 points. Tucumán scored 22 of their points in a 10-minute spell in which they took a 25–20 lead, but Wales were able to come back to win 69–44.

1 June 1999

| Tucumán | 44–69 | Wales |
| Try: García Hamilton (2); T. Molinuevo; L. Molinuevo; Gravano; Padua; Con: T. Molinuevo (4); Pen: T. Molinuevo (2) | Report | Try: Robinson (4); Taylor (2); N. Boobyer (2); Lewis; Con: Hayward (9); Pen: Hayward (2) |

Estadio Monumental José Fierro, Tucumán
Referee: Pablo Deluca (Argentina)

Team details

| FB | 15 | Leonardo Gravano |
| RW | 14 | L. Rojas |
| OC | 13 | Pablo García Hamilton |
| IC | 12 | J. Rodríguez | Substituted off |
| LW | 11 | Martín Pfister |
| FH | 10 | Tristán Molinuevo |
| SH | 9 | Leandro Molinuevo |
| N8 | 8 | Hugo Dande |
| OF | 7 | Eduardo Padua (c) |
| BF | 6 | José Santamarina | Substituted off |
| RL | 5 | Omar Portillo |
| LL | 4 | José Macome |
| TP | 3 | Omar Hasan |
| HK | 2 | M. Coll | Substituted off |
| LP | 1 | Leopoldo de Chazal |
Replacements:
| | 16 | S. Retondo | Substituted in |
| | 17 | J. Martinez | Substituted in |
| | 18 | J. Belloto | Substituted in |
Coach:
José Javier Fernández

| FB | 15 | Neil Boobyer |
| RW | 14 | Nick Walne |
| OC | 13 | Mark Taylor | Substituted off |
| IC | 12 | Stephen Jones |
| LW | 11 | Matthew Robinson |
| FH | 10 | Byron Hayward |
| SH | 9 | David Llewellyn |
| N8 | 8 | Geraint Lewis | Substituted off |
| OF | 7 | Martyn Williams (c) |
| BF | 6 | Richard Arnold |
| RL | 5 | Andy Moore |
| LL | 4 | Gareth Llewellyn |
| TP | 3 | Dai Young | Substituted off |
| HK | 2 | Jonathan Humphreys |
| LP | 1 | Andrew Lewis | Substituted off |
Replacements:
| | | Matthew Watkins | Substituted in |
| | | Darren Morris | Substituted in |
| | | Chris Anthony | Substituted in |
| | | Ian Boobyer | Substituted in |
Coach:
Graham Henry

=== Argentina v Wales (1st test) ===
Following his four tries in the game against Tucumán four days earlier, Matthew Robinson was named on the wing for Wales's first test against Argentina, taking the place of Gareth Thomas. In the only other change from the team that beat England in the final game of the Five Nations, Allan Bateman partnered Mark Taylor in the centres in place of the injured Scott Gibbs. Despite a strong team, Wales found themselves 23–0 down before the half-hour mark; fly-half Gonzalo Quesada scored 18 of those points, converting his own try as well as one from Octavio Bartolucci, in addition to three penalties. Wales got back into the game shortly before half-time as Neil Jenkins kicked a penalty before converting a Dafydd James try with the last play of the half, reducing the deficit to 23–10. Jenkins added another penalty before converting a Brett Sinkinson try in the first 10 minutes of the second period. He then levelled the scores as the game entered the final quarter, only for Quesada to restore a three-point lead for the hosts; however, Shane Howarth made it 26–26 with a drop goal in the 68th minute. Wales then pulled clear thanks to a try from Chris Wyatt, which Jenkins converted before kicking another penalty to give the tourists a 36–26 win. Coach Graham Henry blamed Wales's slow start on having arrived late at the stadium; their police escort did not turn up and the team coach was blocked in at the hotel, which meant they arrived only 45 minutes before kick-off. Henry commended his team's determination to come back from 23–0 down, and reserved special praise for their scrummaging, particularly that of hooker Garin Jenkins, who he said he had "misjudged" when he took over as Wales coach.

5 June 1999

| Argentina | 26–36 | Wales |
| Try: Quesada 24' c Bartolucci 28' c Con: Quesada (2); Pen: Quesada (4) 5', 16', 26', 65' | Report | Try: James 40+2' c Sinkinson 49' c Wyatt 74' c Con: N. Jenkins (3); Pen: N. Jenkins (4) 37', 45', 63', 77'; Drop: Howarth 68' |

Ferro Carril Oeste, Buenos Aires
Attendance: 16,500
Referee: Brian Campsall (England)

| FB | 15 | Diego Albanese |
| RW | 14 | Octavio Bartolucci |
| OC | 13 | Eduardo Simone |
| IC | 12 | Lisandro Arbizu |
| LW | 11 | Ezequiel Jurado |
| FH | 10 | Gonzalo Quesada |
| SH | 9 | Agustín Pichot |
| N8 | 8 | Pablo Camerlinckx | Substituted off |
| OF | 7 | Ignacio Fernández Lobbe |
| BF | 6 | Rolando Martín |
| RL | 5 | Alejandro Allub | Substituted off |
| LL | 4 | Pedro Sporleder (c) |
| TP | 3 | Mauricio Reggiardo |
| HK | 2 | Federico Méndez |
| LP | 1 | Roberto Grau | Substituted off |
Replacements:
| PR | 16 | Omar Hasan | Substituted in |
| HK | 17 | Mario Ledesma |
| FL | 18 | Lucas Ostiglia | Substituted in |
| N8 | 19 | Gonzalo Longo | Substituted in |
| SH | 20 | Nicolás Fernández Miranda |
| FH | 21 | Felipe Contepomi |
| CE | 22 | José Orengo |
Coach:
(New Zealand) Alex Wyllie

| FB | 15 | Shane Howarth |
| RW | 14 | Matthew Robinson |
| OC | 13 | Mark Taylor |
| IC | 12 | Allan Bateman |
| LW | 11 | Dafydd James |
| FH | 10 | Neil Jenkins |
| SH | 9 | Rob Howley (c) |
| N8 | 8 | Scott Quinnell |
| OF | 7 | Brett Sinkinson |
| BF | 6 | Colin Charvis |
| RL | 5 | Chris Wyatt |
| LL | 4 | Craig Quinnell |
| TP | 3 | Ben Evans | Substituted off |
| HK | 2 | Garin Jenkins |
| LP | 1 | Peter Rogers | Substituted off |
Replacements:
| PR | 16 | Dai Young | Substituted in |
| PR | 17 | Andrew Lewis | Substituted in |
| CE | 18 | Neil Boobyer |
| FH | 19 | Stephen Jones |
| SH | 20 | David Llewellyn |
| LK | 21 | Mike Voyle |
| HK | 22 | Jonathan Humphreys |
Coach:
(New Zealand) Graham Henry

Assistant referees:
Chris White (England)
Wayne Erickson (Australia)

=== Argentina A v Wales ===
Graham Henry changed his entire starting line-up for the midweek match against Argentina A in Rosario. The opening 20 minutes of the game saw Arwel Thomas and Felipe Contepomi trade penalties, but tries from Juan Fernández Miranda, Gonzalo Camardón and Nicolás Fernández Miranda in the second quarter meant Wales trailed 27–15 at the break. Further penalties from Contepomi, a drop goal from Camardón and a converted try from Patricio Grande extended that lead to 29 points before Wales scored their first try through scrum-half Rhodri Jones just before the hour mark. Neil Boobyer added another a few minutes later, and Nick Walne also crossed as the game entered the final 10 minutes, but despite successful conversions from Arwel Thomas, it was not enough to avoid another tour defeat. During the match, a photography gantry collapsed under the weight of around 20 spectators who had climbed on it; there were no serious injuries, but the match was stopped for six minutes while aid was provided.

8 June 1999

| Argentina XV | 47–34 | Wales |
| Try: J. Fernández Miranda 23' c Camardón 34' c N. Fernández Miranda 40+4' c Grande 52' m Con: Contepomi (3); Pen: Contepomi (6) 8', 19', 40+3', 42', 47', 63'; Drop: Camardón 49' | Report | Try: R. Jones 58' m N. Boobyer 61' c Walne 71' c Con: A. Thomas (2); Pen: A. Thomas (5) 3', 13', 31', 36', 40+1' |

Jorge Newbery Municipal Stadium, Rosario
Referee: Wayne Erickson (Australia)

Team details

| FB | 15 | Diego Giannantonio |
| RW | 14 | Patricio Grande |
| OC | 13 | Gonzalo Camardón | Substituted off |
| IC | 12 | Juan Fernández Miranda |
| LW | 11 | Martín Pfister |
| FH | 10 | Felipe Contepomi |
| SH | 9 | Nicolás Fernández Miranda (c) |
| N8 | 8 | Gonzalo Longo |
| OF | 7 | Augusto Petrilli |
| BF | 6 | Santiago Phelan |
| RL | 5 | Raúl Pérez |
| LL | 4 | Germán Llanes | Substituted off |
| TP | 3 | Martín Scelzo | Substituted off |
| HK | 2 | Mario Ledesma |
| LP | 1 | Fernando Díaz Alberdi | Substituted off |
Replacements:
| WG | | José María Núñez Piossek | Substituted in |
| PR | | German Aristide | Substituted in |
| PR | | Santiago González Bonorino | Substituted in |
| LK | | Omar Portillo | Substituted in |
Coaches:
Raúl Sanz; Gonzalo Del Cerro

| FB | 15 | Neil Boobyer |
| RW | 14 | Nick Walne |
| OC | 13 | Leigh Davies |
| IC | 12 | Stephen Jones |
| LW | 11 | Gareth Thomas | Substituted off |
| FH | 10 | Arwel Thomas | Substituted off |
| SH | 9 | Rhodri Jones | Substituted off |
| N8 | 8 | Geraint Lewis | Substituted off |
| OF | 7 | Martyn Williams (c) |
| BF | 6 | Richard Arnold |
| RL | 5 | Andy Moore | Substituted off |
| LL | 4 | Mike Voyle |
| TP | 3 | Dai Young | Substituted off |
| HK | 2 | Jonathan Humphreys |
| LP | 1 | Darren Morris | Substituted off |
Replacements:
| CE | | Matthew Watkins | Substituted in |
| FH | | Byron Hayward | Substituted in |
| SH | | David Llewellyn | Substituted in |
| PR | | Andrew Lewis | Substituted in |
| PR | | Chris Anthony | Substituted in |
| LK | | Gareth Llewellyn | Substituted in |
| FL | | Ian Boobyer | Substituted in |
Coach:
Graham Henry

=== Argentina v Wales (2nd test) ===
Having failed to live up to his performance against Tucumán in the first test, Matthew Robinson was dropped in favour of Gareth Thomas on the right wing as one of two changes to the Wales line-up from a week earlier; the other change saw Geraint Lewis come in for Colin Charvis in the back row. Wales took an 8–0 lead in the opening 15 minutes thanks to a penalty from Neil Jenkins and a try from his namesake Garin. Felipe Contepomi reduced the deficit with a penalty 10 minutes later, but that was soon followed by the biggest flashpoint of the game; after Dafydd James was deemed to have illegally killed the ball, he was punched by Argentina prop Mauricio Reggiardo, sparking a mass brawl on the sideline. As a result, Reggiardo was yellow-carded along with Argentina captain Pedro Sporleder and Wales prop Peter Rogers. Contepomi put Argentina into a 9–8 lead with two more penalties, only for Jenkins to edge Wales back in front with a kick of his own on the stroke of half-time. He added another early in the second half, before stretching the lead to 17–9 with a 46th-minute drop goal after Chris Wyatt managed to steal the ball from an Argentina line-out. Wales had the chance to put the contest to bed shortly after as Thomas headed towards the try line, only to knock on. Contepomi missed the opportunity to close the gap with two kicks at goal, and Wales responded with two more penalties of their own to take the lead to 23–9 and Jenkins' international points total past the 800 mark, behind only Australian fly-half Michael Lynagh. José Orengo's try, converted by José Cilley, reduced the home side's deficit to seven points in the final minutes, but it was too little, too late as Wales secured the whitewash and their first series win in the Southern Hemisphere.

12 June 1999

| Argentina | 16–23 | Wales |
| Try: Orengo 77' c Con: Cilley; Pen: Contepomi (3) 26', 33', 36' | Report | Try: G. Jenkins 15' m Pen: N. Jenkins (5) 12', 40', 44', 65', 68'; Drop: N. Jenkins 46' |

Ferro Carril Oeste, Buenos Aires
Attendance: 20,000
Referee: Chris White (England)

| FB | 15 | Diego Albanese |
| RW | 14 | Octavio Bartolucci |
| OC | 13 | José Orengo |
| IC | 12 | Lisandro Arbizu |
| LW | 11 | Gonzalo Camardón |
| FH | 10 | Felipe Contepomi | Substituted off |
| SH | 9 | Agustín Pichot |
| N8 | 8 | Gonzalo Longo |
| OF | 7 | Miguel Ruiz |
| BF | 6 | Rolando Martín | Substituted off |
| RL | 5 | Ignacio Fernández Lobbe | Substituted off |
| LL | 4 | Pedro Sporleder (c) |
| TP | 3 | Mauricio Reggiardo | Substituted off |
| HK | 2 | Federico Méndez | Substituted off |
| LP | 1 | Roberto Grau |
Replacements:
| FH | 16 | José Cilley | Substituted in |
| LK | 17 | Alejandro Allub | Substituted in |
| HK | 18 | Mario Ledesma | Substituted in |
| FL | 19 | Lucas Ostiglia | Substituted in |
| PR | 20 | Omar Hasan | Substituted in |
| CE | 21 | Juan Fernández Miranda |
| SH | 22 | Nicolás Fernández Miranda |
Coach:
(New Zealand) Alex Wyllie

| FB | 15 | Shane Howarth |
| RW | 14 | Gareth Thomas |
| OC | 13 | Mark Taylor |
| IC | 12 | Allan Bateman |
| LW | 11 | Dafydd James |
| FH | 10 | Neil Jenkins |
| SH | 9 | Rob Howley (c) |
| N8 | 8 | Scott Quinnell |
| OF | 7 | Brett Sinkinson |
| BF | 6 | Geraint Lewis | Substituted off |
| RL | 5 | Chris Wyatt |
| LL | 4 | Craig Quinnell |
| TP | 3 | Ben Evans | Substituted off |
| HK | 2 | Garin Jenkins |
| LP | 1 | Peter Rogers | Substituted off |
Replacements:
| PR | 16 | Dai Young | Substituted in |
| HK | 17 | Jonathan Humphreys | Substituted in |
| PR | 18 | Andrew Lewis | Substituted in |
| CE | 19 | Neil Boobyer |
| FH | 20 | Stephen Jones |
| SH | 21 | David Llewellyn |
| LK | 22 | Mike Voyle |
Coach:
(New Zealand) Graham Henry

Assistant referees:
Brian Campsall (England)
Wayne Erickson (Australia)
