= International rugby union eligibility rules =

Rules to determine if a player can represent a country in rugby union

Regulations relating to the eligibility of players to play for national teams in rugby union, both in the fifteen-a-side game and rugby sevens, are the responsibility of World Rugby, the governing body for the sport. Players have been able to play for a national team based on birth, a period of residency, or having a parent or grandparent born in that country.

A player is allowed to transfer to another country once, with approval of the World Rugby Regulations Committee, if the player is born in the country to which they wish to transfer or has a parent or grandparent who was born in that country. A player's eligibility to play for a second country depends on whether they have a genuine, close, credible and established national link with that country. Playing for a second country is not permitted by means of residency. Switching countries is also possible through playing in Olympic events, provided the player has the nationality of the second country. In any case, a waiting period of three years applies.

== History ==
=== Pre-2000 ===
World Rugby was founded, as the International Rugby Football Board (IRFB), in 1886.

Until the 1990s, a player needed to be born in a country or have a parent or grandparent born in a country, to be eligible to play for that country's national team. Provided they met these criteria, players could play for more than one country and transfer to another country without a stand-down period.

Formally, the IRFB Regulations did not provide for eligibility based on residency, but during the 20th century there were multiple examples of players representing nations with which they had no birth or family connection. This changed in the early 1990s, when the IRFB amended its eligibility rules to specifically allow foreign players to play for a country after three years of residence. Also a stand-down period of three years was introduced for captured players (i.e., players who had represented a country at international level) seeking to represent another country.

In March 1994, the IRFB reduced the residency requirement for foreign players from three years to one year of residence.

=== 2000 amendments: one country rule ===
Both the eligibility rules and the adoption of professionalism in 1995 increased the number of players representing nations other than their country of birth. Particularly the number of Pacific Island players representing New Zealand and Australia (either in the fifteen-a-side form of the game or in sevens) and Southern Hemisphere players playing for Northern Hemisphere nations grew significantly in the second half of the 1990s, due to a big difference in resources and professional pathways between rugby nations.

Eventually, after a review of the eligibility rules, the IRFB – on 17 January 1997 – adopted an amendment to its regulations (effective from 1 January 2000) so that a player could only represent one country. A player who represented a country by playing for its national team, official second national (or "A") team or sevens team against an equivalent team from another country, would no longer be able to switch countries.

Players who played for a national team after 1 January 1997 could no longer change countries, because the stand-down period of three years would be completed after the new rule came into effect. It also resulted in unions rushing into capping dual eligible players before 1 January 2000, before the new rule would prevent them from doing so. This went as far as the Scottish Rugby Union organising a match between Scotland A and the Netherlands on 21 December 1999 for the sole purpose of capturing players Paul Johnstone (35 caps for Zimbabwe) and Alistair Murdoch (2 caps for Australia) before the new rule came into effect.

=== 2000–2014 ===
In this period there were several unsuccessful attempts to change the rules.

In March 2000, an Australian proposal to abolish the grandparent rule and to extend the required residency period from three to five years failed to get support. One month later, the IRB discussed a New Zealand proposal to remove sevens teams as capturing teams.

In November 2004, the IRB rejected another proposal from New Zealand. This (amended) proposal asked to allow players who had played for Tier 1 countries to change to Tier 2 countries after a stand-down period of one year, if they satisfied the eligibility criteria for the Tier 2 country. New Zealand's original proposal was again to remove sevens from capturing players for fifteens, but it was not voted on. The IRB preferred to await the decision of the International Olympic Committee about making sevens an Olympic sport.

In December 2009, a Federation of Oceania Rugby Unions' proposal, backed by New Zealand, again asked to allow Tier 1 players to switch to Tier 2 nations after a 12-month stand-down. This proposal was met with significant resistance from particularly Ireland, Scotland and Wales and was sent back to the IRB Regulations Committee. One of the arguments raised was that it could possibly be discriminatory because it seemed to favour players of some ethnicities over others.

=== 2014 amendments: Olympic exception ===
Following lobbying by the IRB, rugby sevens was added to the Olympic Programme for the 2016 and 2020 Summer Olympics on 9 October 2009.

In 2014, the IRB amended its regulations. A requirement for players to be a national of the country they represent at the Olympic Games was introduced, in addition to the existing eligibility criteria of having a genuine, close, credible and established national link with that country. Captured players were allowed to change to another country of which they had the nationality after a stand-down period of three years, which was reduced to 18 months for the 2016 Olympic Sevens.

Initially, players who represented a new country at one sevens tournament regarded as an Olympic event could represent that country in any other form of the game. While the IRB's Regulations Committee would consider every application for transfer to another country and check whether the reasons for the application were "bona fide sevens reasons", the IRB decided to tighten its regulations to prevent abuse that went against the spirit of the regulation. On 18 September 2014, the IRB ruled that a player had to play in at least four Olympic events to complete their transfer to another country.

=== 2017 amendments: extension of the residency requirement period ===
From 2016, the residency period was back on the agenda of World Rugby (as the IRB has been called since 19 November 2014). The main driver behind this was the vice-chairman Agustín Pichot. Pichot was determined to put an end to the player drain from smaller nations – such as the Pacific Island nations – and the phenomenon of so-called 'project players'.

On 10 May 2017, World Rugby adopted changes to the eligibility rules in Regulation 8:

- the residency requirement was increased from 36 to 60 consecutive months (effective from 31 December 2020);
- a new eligibility criteria was introduced: players with 10 years of cumulative residency in a country could also become eligible to play for that country (effective 10 May 2017);
- national U20s teams could no longer be nominated by national unions as their next senior national representative team (effective 1 January 2018);
- two different age criteria applied for sevens players: they would be captured by a union if they had reached the age of majority if they played for the national representative sevens team of that union in the Olympic Games or Rugby World Cup Sevens; in all other tournaments or events they would be captured if they had reached the age of 20 on or before the date of participation (effective 1 July 2017).

On 10 August 2020, World Rugby decided to retain the 36-month residency requirement for one more year, to 31 December 2021. World Rugby considered that, due to the COVID-19 pandemic, there were too limited playing opportunities for players to meet the residency requirement and have represented their union before the end of the year 2020.

Subsequently, the Scottish Rugby Union announced that it had hired a team of scouts ("Scottish Qualified representatives") that would start a world-wide search for players with Scottish ancestry, who would be eligible to play for Scotland, despite not being born there.

=== 2021 amendments ===
From 1 January 2022, a player who has been captured by playing for a country in either fifteens or sevens can change to a new country once, provided they or their parent or grandparent were born in the new country, and that they have not been selected for their original national team for 3 years. A transfer is subject to approval by the World Rugby Regulations Committee.

This eligibility rule change was expected to mostly benefit the Pacific Island nations and other tier 2 or 3 nations.

The "age of majority" across fifteens and sevens rugby was also amended, so that all players will be captured by playing for a national representative team at the age of 18 years.

== See also ==
- Giteau's law
- Grandfather rule
- Grannygate
- IRL eligibility rules - comparable rules for rugby league
- Laws of rugby union
- List of rugby union players who have represented more than one nation
- World Rugby
