= 1998–99 Tetley's Bitter Cup =

English rugby union competition

Tournament details
- Countries: England
- Tournament format(s): knockout

Tournament statistics

Final
- Venue: Twickenham Stadium
- Champions: Wasps (1st title)
- Runners-up: Newcastle Falcons

The 1998–99 Tetley's Bitter Cup was the 28th edition of England's rugby union club competition. Wasps won the competition defeating Newcastle Falcons in the final. The event was sponsored by Tetley's Brewery and the final was held at Twickenham Stadium.

== Draw and results ==
=== First round (19 September) ===
Home	Away	Score
Aspatria	Bedford Athletic	17-32
Banbury	Scunthorpe	5-27
Barkers Butts	Macclesfield	17-24
Bromsgrove	Sedgley Park	10-34
Cheshunt	Morpeth	33-26
Clevedon	Barking	7-32
Clifton	Esher	3-60
Doncaster	Walsall	30-19
Guildford & Godalming	Bridgwater	18-28
Hinckley	Nuneaton	20-24
Hull Ionians	Egremont	59-0
Kendal	Broadstreet	13-12
Launceston	North Walsham	32-18
Malvern	Sandal	14-52
Metropolitan Police	Cheltenham	34-8
New Brighton	Lichfield	33-8
Norwich	Winchester	15-23
Penzance & Newlyn	Cambridge	32-13
Plymouth	Redruth	32-18
Preston Grasshoppers	Kenilworth	43-6
Ruislip	Old Colleians	9-43
Spartans	Havant	10-24
Swanage & Wareham	Abbey	33-7
Tabard	Wimbledon	26-23
Torquay Athletic	Maidenhead	15-29
Tynedale	Winnington Park	47-10
Westcombe Park	Bracknell	14-21
Weston-super-Mare	Ipswich	34-26
Whitchurch	Aspull	32-10

=== Second round (17 October) ===
Home	Away	Score
Bridgwater	Rosslyn Park	15-49
Esher	Tabard	41-3
Henley Hawks	Havant	100-19
Hull Ionians	Macclesfield	13-3
Kendal	Liverpool	20-7
Lydney	Camberley	44-34
Maidenhead	Launceston	22-21
Metropolitan Police	Winchester	25-14
New Brighton	Nuneaton	25-10
Newbury	Cheshunt	37-13
Nottingham	Preston Grasshoppers	50-3
Old Colleians	Swanage & Wareham	23-32
Otley	Morley	18-20
Plymouth	Barking	13-18
Reading	Penzance & Newlyn	21-5
Sandal	Doncaster	6-3
Scunthorpe	Harrogate	0-29
Sedgley Park	Manchester	20-17
Tynedale	Stourbridge	22-30
Weston-super-Mare	Bracknell	15-42
Wharfedale	Birmingham & Solihull	27-5
Whitchurch	Bedford Athletic	23-15

=== Third round (14 November) ===
Home	Away	Score
Blackheath	Sedgley Park	21-22
Bracknell	Metropolitan Police	13-6
Bristol	Sandal	55-0
Coventry	Worcester	26-36
Esher	Harrogate	42-17
Exeter	Whitchurch	81-11
Hull Ionians	Newbury	7-31
Lydney	Stourbridge	44-5
Morley	Maidenhead	39-25
Moseley	Fylde	22-15
Nottingham	Wharfedale	27-17
Reading	Orrell	12-23
Rosslyn Park	Henley Hawks	12-16
Rotherham	London Welsh	8-6
Rugby	Leeds	7-68
Swanage & Wareham	Barking	6-36
Wakefield	Kendal	8-16
Waterloo	New Brighton	34-23

=== Fourth round (11 January) ===
Home	Away	Score
Bedford	Henley Hawks	22-29
Bristol	London Irish	19-43
Gloucester	Worcester	31-17
Harlequins	Esher	46-10
Kendal	London Scottish	20-25
Leicester	Barking	65-6
Morley	Saracens	8-76
Moseley	Lydney	23-25
Newcastle Falcons	Bath	25-22
Nottingham	Exeter	8-24
Rotherham	Leeds	24-27
Richmond	Newbury	46-12
Sale	Northampton	31-47
Sedgley Park	Wasps	3-53
Waterloo	Orrell	16-11 aet
West Hartlepool	Bracknell	34-14

=== Fifth round (30 January) ===
Team One	Team Two	Score
Gloucester	Henley Hawks	31–9
Leicester	Leeds Tykes	49–0
London Scottish	Harlequins	33–37
Lydney	Saracens	0–40
Northampton	London Irish	6–21
Richmond	Exeter	37–10
Wasps	Waterloo	27–10
West Hartlepool	Newcastle Falcons	21–32

=== Quarter-finals (27 February) ===
Home	Away	Score
Gloucester	Harlequins	15–13
Newcastle Falcons	Saracens	15–0
Richmond	Leicester	15-–3
Wasps	London Irish	19–3

=== Semi-finals (3 & 4 April) ===
Home	Away	Score
Richmond	Newcastle Falcons	3–20
Wasps	Gloucester	35–21

=== Final ===
15 May 1999

Wasps	29–19	Newcastle Falcons
Try: Alex King; Josh Lewsey; Con: Gareth Rees 2 Pen: Gareth Rees 4 Drop: Alex King		Try: Va'aiga Tuigamala; Con: Jonny Wilkinson; Pen: Jonny Wilkinson 4

Twickenham Stadium, London
Attendance: 48,000
Referee: Steve Lander (Liverpool)

Wasps
Newcastle Falcons

15	(Canada) Gareth Rees
14	(England) Josh Lewsey
13	(England) Fraser Waters
12	(England) Mark Denney
11	(England) Paul Sampson
10	(England) Alex King
9	(England) Andy Gomarsall
8	(England) Peter Scrivener
7	(England) Joe Worsley
6	(England) Lawrence Dallaglio
5	(England) Simon Shaw
4	(New Zealand) Mark Weedon (c)
3	(England) Will Green
2	(Samoa) Trevor Leota
1	(England) Darren Molloy
Replacements:
16	(England) Mike Friday
17	(Scotland) Kenny Logan
18	(Ireland) Rob Henderson
19	(England) Dinos Alexopoulos
20	(England) Joe Beardshaw
21	(England) Paul Volley
22	(England) Adam Black
Coach:
Rob Smith

15	(England) Stuart Legg
14	(England) Jim Naylor
13	(England) Martin Shaw
12	(England) Tom May
11	(New Zealand) Va'aiga Tuigamala
10	(England) Jonny Wilkinson
9	(Scotland) Gary Armstrong (c)
8	(Scotland) Ross Beattie
7	(New Zealand) Richard Arnold
6	(Scotland) Peter Walton
5	(Scotland) Doddie Weir
4	(England) Gareth Archer
3	(South Africa) Marius Hurter
2	(Ireland) Ross Nesdale
1	(Scotland) George Graham
Replacements:
16	(England) Hall Charlton
17	(England) Peter Massey
18	(England) Tony Underwood
19	(England) Richard Horton
20	(England) Ian Peel
21	(England) Hugh Vyvyan
22	(England) Jimmy Cartmell
Coach:
(England) Steve Bates
