= 2000–2001 Tetley's Bitter Cup =

English rugby union club competition

Tournament statistics

The 2000–2001 Tetley's Bitter Cup was the 30th edition of England's rugby union club competition. Newcastle Falcons won the competition defeating Harlequins in the final. The event was sponsored by Tetley's Brewery and the final was held at Twickenham Stadium.

== Draw and results ==
=== First round (Sep 23) ===
Team one	Team two	Score
Darlington	Aspatria	32–15
Darlington Mowden Park	Broughton Park	38–14
Dorchester	Staines	24–21
Dunstablians	Dudley Kingswinford	26–34
Gloucester Old Boys	Cheltenham	17–29
Gordano	Camborne	31–22
Halifax	Tynedale	18–19
Havant	Harlow	31–17
Launceston	Truro	26–20
Leicester Lions	Scunthorpe	28–14
Liverpool St Helens	Driffield	33–28
Longton	Hinckley	?
Norwich	Westcombe Park	3–7
Old Colleians	Basingstoke	39–3
Selby	West Park St Helens	14–20
Swanage & Wareham	Amersham & Chiltern	18–12
Weston-super-Mare	Barnstaple	15–46
Whitchurch	Spalding	22–9
Wimbledon	Haywards Heath	10–38
Worthing	Cheshunt	8–9

=== Second round (Oct 7) ===
Team one	Team two	Score
Barking	Tabard	24–8
Blackheath	Swanage & Wareham	9–7
Bracknell	Dorchester	45–0
Camberley	Barnstaple	28–26
Cheshunt	Clifton	18–12
Darlington Mowden Park	West Park St Helens	21–3
Fylde	Whitchurch	16–11
Havant	Penzance & Newlyn	13–32
Launceston	Gordano	40–10
Liverpool St Helens	Nuneaton	23–7
New Brighton	Leicester Lions	40–17
Newbury	Haywards Heath	45–21
Nottingham	Morley	19–23
Old Colleians	North Walsham	17–21
Plymouth	Westcombe Park	54–6
Preston Grasshoppers	Bedford Athletic	49–19
Reading	Cheltenham	49–8
Redruth	Esher	10–14
Rosslyn Park	Lydney	30–3
Rugby	Harrogate	16–15
Sandal	Tynedale	14–15
Sedgley Park	Kendal	17–9
Stourbridge	Doncaster	13–9
Walsall	Dudley Kingswinford	17–21
Wharfedale	Darlington	28–17
West Hartlepool	Longton	8–15

=== Third round (Oct 21) ===
Team one	Team two	Score
Barking	Rosslyn Park	17–29
Bedford	Sedgley Park	45–15
Birmingham/Solihull	Orrell	29–25
Bracknell	Cheshunt	33–3
Coventry	Preston Grasshoppers	30–19
Darlington Mowden Park	North Walsham	27–10
Esher	Camberley	38–24
Exeter	Stourbridge	29–15
Fylde	Manchester	10–33
Leeds Tykes	Morley	100–0
Liverpool St Helens	Rugby	17–0
London Welsh	Blackheath	44–3
Moseley	Worcester	6-34
New Brighton	Newbury	15–11
Otley	Henley Hawks	26–24
Penzance & Newlyn	Wakefield	22–25
Plymouth	Wharfedale	21–11
Reading	Launceston	31–25
Tynedale	Longton	23–11
Waterloo	Dudley Kingswinford	57–27

=== Fourth round (Nov 4 & 5) ===
Team one	Team two	Score
Bath	Gloucester	18–24
Bedford	Saracens	24–54
Birmingham & Solihull	Darlington Mowden Park	16–10
Bristol	London Wasps	22–17
Esher	Waterloo	26–27
Exeter	London Irish	12–57
Leicester Tigers	Otley	83–11
New Brighton	London Welsh	17–32
Northampton Saints	Leeds Tykes	73–35
Plymouth	Harlequins	8-36
Reading	Rotherham	27–46
Rosslyn Park	Newcastle Falcons	13–25
Rugby	Manchester	26–38
Sale Sharks	Coventry	37–19
Tynedale	Worcester	12–76
Wakefield	Bracknell	31–23

=== Fifth round (Nov 11 & 12) ===
Team one	Team two	Score
Gloucester	Leicester Tigers	13-25
Harlequins	Manchester	38-8
London Welsh	London Irish	10-33
Newcastle Falcons	Bristol Shoguns	32-16
Northampton Saints	Birmingham/Solihull	47-14
Sale Sharks	Rotherham	20-12
Saracens	Worcester	42-13
Wakefield Trinity	Waterloo	23-35

=== Quarter-finals (Dec 9 & 10) ===
Team one	Team two	Score
Harlequins	Northampton	11-6
Leicester Tigers	Saracens	41-24
Newcastle Falcons	London Irish	33-20
Sale Sharks	Waterloo	59-12

=== Semi-finals (Jan 6) ===
Team one	Team two	Score
Harlequins	Leicester Tigers	22-18
Newcastle Falcons	Sale Sharks	37-25

=== Final ===
24 February 2001

Newcastle Falcons	30–27	Harlequins
Try: May 2 Walder; Jenner; Con: Wilkinson 2 Pen: Wilkinson 2	Report	Try: Wilson; Burke; Con: Burke; Pen: Burke 5

Twickenham Stadium, London
Attendance: 71,000
Referee: Ed Morrison (Bristol)

Newcastle
Harlequins

15	(England) Dave Walder
14	(England) Michael Stephenson
13	(England) Jamie Noon
12	(England) Tom May
11	(New Zealand) Va'aiga Tuigamala
10	(England) Jonny Wilkinson
9	(Scotland) Gary Armstrong
8	(England) Jim Jenner
7	(Scotland) Andrew Mower
6	(England) Robert Devonshire
5	(Scotland) Doddie Weir (c)
4	(Scotland) Stuart Grimes
3	(South Africa) Marius Hurter
2	(Ireland) Ross Nesdale
1	(England) Micky Ward
Replacements:
16	(England) Hall Charlton
17	(England) Liam Botham
18	(England) Gareth Maclure
19	(England) Ian Peel
20	(New Zealand) Mike Howe
21	(England) Hugh Vyvyan
22	(New Zealand) Richard Arnold
Coach:
(England) Steve Bates

15	(England) Ryan O'Neill
14	(England) Nick Greenstock
13	(England) Will Greenwood
12	(England) Nick Burrows
11	(New Zealand) Brendon Daniel
10	(Ireland) Paul Burke
9	(Wales) Matt Powell
8	(England) Roy Winters
7	(Australia) David Wilson (c)
6	(England) Pat Sanderson
5	(England) Steve White-Cooper
4	(Australia) Garrick Morgan
3	(England) Jon Dawson
2	(Ireland) Keith Wood
1	(England) Jason Leonard
Replacements:
16	(England) Peter Richards
17	(Scotland) Craig Chalmers
18	(England) Ben Gollings
19	(Australia) Bruce Starr
20	(Samoa) Tani Fuga
21	(England) Alex Codling
22	(England) Rory Jenkins
Coach:
(Wales) Mark Evans
