= Jason Jones-Hughes =

Australian rugby union player (born 1976)

- Born: Jason Jones-Hughes; 13 September 1976 Sydney, Australia
- Height: 191 cm (6 ft 3 in)
- Weight: 104 kg (16 st 5 lb)

Rugby union career
- Position(s): Centre, Wing
Senior career
| Years | Team | Apps | (Points) |
| –1999 | Randwick | | |
| 1999–2003 | Newport | 51 | (75) |
| 2003–2004 | Munster | 9 | (0) |
Super Rugby
| Years | Team | Apps | (Points) |
| 1997–1999 | Waratahs | 27 | (15) |
International career
| Years | Team | Apps | (Points) |
| 1999–2000 | Wales | 3 | (0) |

Jason Jones-Hughes (born 13 September 1976) is a former professional rugby union player. He primarily played as a centre but could also play on the wing. Born in Sydney, Australia, he played internationally for Wales, making his debut at the 1999 Rugby World Cup after a protracted legal battle over his eligibility with the Australian Rugby Union. He earned three caps before poor form and injuries curtailed his international career. At club level, he played for the New South Wales Waratahs, Newport and Munster. He retired in 2004 after a year in Ireland, having suffered a lower back injury.

== Career ==
Born in Sydney, Australia, Jones-Hughes played for Australia at youth international level, making appearances for the under-16s, schools, under-19s and under-21s. At club level, he played for Randwick and the New South Wales Waratahs in the Super 12, making eleven appearances in the 1998 competition and eight in 1999, scoring a total of three tries. In April 1999, he was approached by Wales coach Graham Henry about a move to Cardiff RFC with a view to being selected by Wales for the 1999 Rugby World Cup; despite being born in Australia, he was eligible to play for Wales as his father, Robert Jones-Hughes, was from Colwyn Bay.

In June 1999, Jones-Hughes was named in a preliminary Wales squad for the World Cup; that selection was challenged by the Australian Rugby Union (ARU) as Jones-Hughes had previously played for the Australia national team in an uncapped match while touring in Argentina in 1997, as well as for the Australian Barbarians, who were considered Australia's de facto second team at the time. Their objection was bolstered when they named Jones-Hughes in the Australian Barbarians squad to play against New Zealand A in July 1999, although Jones-Hughes was unsure of his eligibility after making himself available for Wales selection.

The International Rugby Board (IRB) upheld the ARU's objection, and the ARU threatened to fine Jones-Hughes if he did not report for Barbarians duty against New Zealand A. The Welsh Rugby Union (WRU) appealed the decision, and were given an extra two weeks to finalise their World Cup squad pending the result of the appeal on 5 September 1999. The decision was ultimately overturned and Jones-Hughes was declared eligible to play for Wales at the World Cup. Despite the verdict, the ARU maintained their position regarding Jones-Hughes' contract and warned that Wales might have to forfeit any matches Jones-Hughes was involved in were the decision reversed again. They also complained over advertisements run in Australian media encouraging other players with Welsh ancestry to declare eligibility for the Wales national team.

Jones-Hughes joined up with the Wales squad for their final tournament preparations in September 1999. He was named on the bench for the opening match of the World Cup against Argentina, and impressed enough to earn a starting spot on the right wing for the second game against Japan; however, he was left out for the quarter-final against Australia, which Wales lost 24–9.

After the tournament, Jones-Hughes joined Welsh side Newport, who attempted to register him to play in the 1999–2000 European Challenge Cup; however, clearance for his transfer was not received from the ARU in time, resulting in an ultimatum from the Welsh Rugby Union (WRU) for them to respond or Jones-Hughes would be played without their approval. He was ultimately released by 25 November 1999, but without compensation being agreed. In March 2000, the ARU claimed £60,000 in compensation from the WRU for Jones-Hughes' rugby development. Jones-Hughes made his debut on 4 December 1999 in a loss to Cardiff RFC, who had also been interested in signing him. He scored a try on his home debut three weeks later, in a 27–22 win over Neath. He scored a further four tries in the 1999–2000 season, including a brace in a 55–20 win over Bridgend on 8 April 2000.

In February 2000, he made his only other appearance for Wales, starting in a 36–3 defeat at home to France on the opening weekend of the inaugural Six Nations Championship. He had a "poor game" according to the BBC, and was dropped for the following game against Italy in favour of the fit-again Allan Bateman, instead playing in the 'A' international against the same opposition. In March 2000, his eligibility for Wales was again called into question when it emerged that teammates Shane Howarth and Brett Sinkinson could not prove their Welsh heritage, and Jones-Hughes was investigated along with English-born, South Africa club prop Peter Rogers and New Zealand–born full-back Matt Cardey. Jones-Hughes was ultimately not implicated, but his call-up by Wales resulted in the ARU proposing changes to IRB regulations that would make it harder for players to switch nations. He suffered an ankle ligament injury in the final game of the season and was forced to withdraw from a Welsh development tour to Canada that summer.

Jones-Hughes scored five tries in 19 appearances for Newport during the 2000–01 season, including two against Cross Keys in a 53–5 win on 2 December 2000. He suffered a knee injury late in the season against Swansea and missed Newport's 13–8 win over Neath in the Principality Cup final. The injury kept him out until the start of the 2001–02 season, and he was initially expected to return for the opening game against Caerphilly on 25 August; however, his return was delayed by six weeks after a consultation with his surgeon.

After his eventual return against Connacht on 11 September, he suffered a recurrence of the injury and missed the rest of the season. He was due to return in a friendly against Worcester on 30 September 2002, only for the English club to pull out of the match at the last minute, meaning it was not until November 2002 that he finally returned in a friendly against Swansea, scoring a try in a 14–13 defeat. He made his competitive comeback in a Heineken Cup match against London Irish, his debut in the competition, on 7 December 2002. He scored a try in the return match against Irish the following week, but it turned out to be Newport's only score in a 42–5 defeat. He played 13 more times in the 2002–03 season, scoring four tries. With the advent of regional rugby in Wales, Jones-Hughes was not offered a contract with any of the five regional sides and he ultimately joined Irish side Munster. He suffered a lower back injury during the season, and on medical advice, he was forced to retire in July 2004.
