= Mike Howe (rugby union) =

NZ rugby union player

- Full name: Michael Henry Howe
- Born: 6 November 1972 (age 54) Whakatāne, New Zealand
- Height: 6 ft 0 in (183 cm)
- Weight: 213 lb (97 kg)

Rugby union career
- Position: Hooker
Senior career
Years	Team	Apps	(Points)
1998–00	London Irish	19	(0)
2000–01	Newcastle Falcons	23	(0)
Provincial / State sides
Years	Team	Apps	(Points)
1995–96	Bay of Plenty	18	(5)

Michael Henry Howe (born 6 November 1972) is a New Zealand former professional rugby union player.

== Rugby career ==
A hooker, Howe played with the Bay of Plenty in 1995 and 1996.

Howe, whose father is English, continued his career in the United Kingdom, and after a stint with Hawick joined London Irish in 1998, taking part in two Premiership Rugby campaigns. He was signed by the Newcastle Falcons in 2000 to provide cover for Ross Nesdale and was on the bench for the side that won the 2000–2001 Tetley's Bitter Cup.
