= 1997 Heineken Cup final =

1997 Heineken Cup Final
- Event: 1996–97 Heineken Cup
Brive	Leicester Tigers
(France)	(England)
28	9
- Date: 25 January 1997
- Venue: Cardiff Arms Park, Cardiff
- Referee: Derek Bevan (Wales)
- Attendance: 41,664

The 1997 Heineken Cup Final was the final match of the 1996–97 Heineken Cup, the second season of Europe's top club rugby union competition. The match was played on 25 January 1997 at the Arms Park in Cardiff. The match was contested by Brive of France and Leicester of England. Brive won the match 28–9; they took the lead early on through a fourth-minute penalty from Christophe Lamaison, and Sébastien Viars extended that lead with an unconverted try two minutes later. Leicester responded with three penalties from John Liley, but Brive finally made their pressure show with three second-half tries, one of which was converted, before Lamaison added a drop goal to seal a 19-point victory.

== Match details ==
25 January 1997
14:30 GMT

Brive (France)	28–9	(England) Leicester Tigers
Try: Viars; Fabre; Carrat (2); Con: Lamaison; Pen: Lamaison; Drop: Lamaison	Report	Pen: J.Liley (3)

Cardiff Arms Park, Cardiff
Attendance: 41,664
Referee: Derek Bevan (Wales)

Brive	Leicester

FB	15	(France) Sebastien Viars
RW	14	(France) Gerald Fabre
OC	13	(France) Christophe Lamaison
IC	12	(France) David Venditti
LW	11	(France) Sebastien Carrat
FH	10	(France) Alain Penaud (c)	(substituted off) 69'
SH	9	(France) Philippe Carbonneau
N8	8	(Poland) Grzegorz Kacala
OF	7	(France) Francois Duboisset	(substituted off) 49'
BF	6	(Belgium) Loic van der Linden	(substituted off) 77'
RL	5	(New Zealand) Grant Ross
LL	4	(France) Eric Alegret	(substituted off) 67'
TP	3	(France) Richard Crespy
HK	2	(France) Laurent Travers
LP	1	(France) Didier Casadeï	(substituted off) 70'
Replacements:
	16	(France) Romuald Paillat	(substituted in) 69'
	17	(France) Eric Bouti	(substituted in) 70'
	18	(Wales) Tony Rees	(substituted in) 67'
	19	(France) Yanni Domi	(substituted in) 77'
	20	(France) Thierry Labrousse	(substituted in) 49'
	21	(France) Sebastien Bonnet
	22	(France) Cédric Heymans

FB	O	(England) John Liley
RW	N	(England) Steve Hackney
OC	M	(England) Will Greenwood
IC	L	(England) Stuart Potter
LW	K	(England) Rory Underwood	(substituted off) 72'
FH	J	(England) Rob Liley
SH	I	(England) Austin Healey
N8	G	(England) Dean Richards (c)	(substituted off) 68'
OF	H	(England) Neil Back
BF	F	(England) John Wells
RL	E	(England) Matt Poole
LL	D	(England) Martin Johnson
TP	C	(England) Darren Garforth	(substituted off) 17'	(substituted in) 22'
HK	B	(England) Richard Cockerill
LP	A	(England) Graham Rowntree
Replacements:
WG	P	(England) Leon Lloyd	(substituted in) 72'
LP	Q	(New Zealand) Perry Freshwater	(substituted in) 17'	(substituted off) 22'
N8	R	(Ireland) Eric Miller	(substituted in) 68'
FH	S	(Ireland) Niall Malone
SH	T	(England) Aadel Kardooni
HK	U	(England) Dorian West
LK	V	(England) Neil Fletcher
Coach:
(Australia) Bob Dwyer

== See also ==
- 1996–97 Heineken Cup
