= Simon Easterby =

Irish rugby union coach and former player

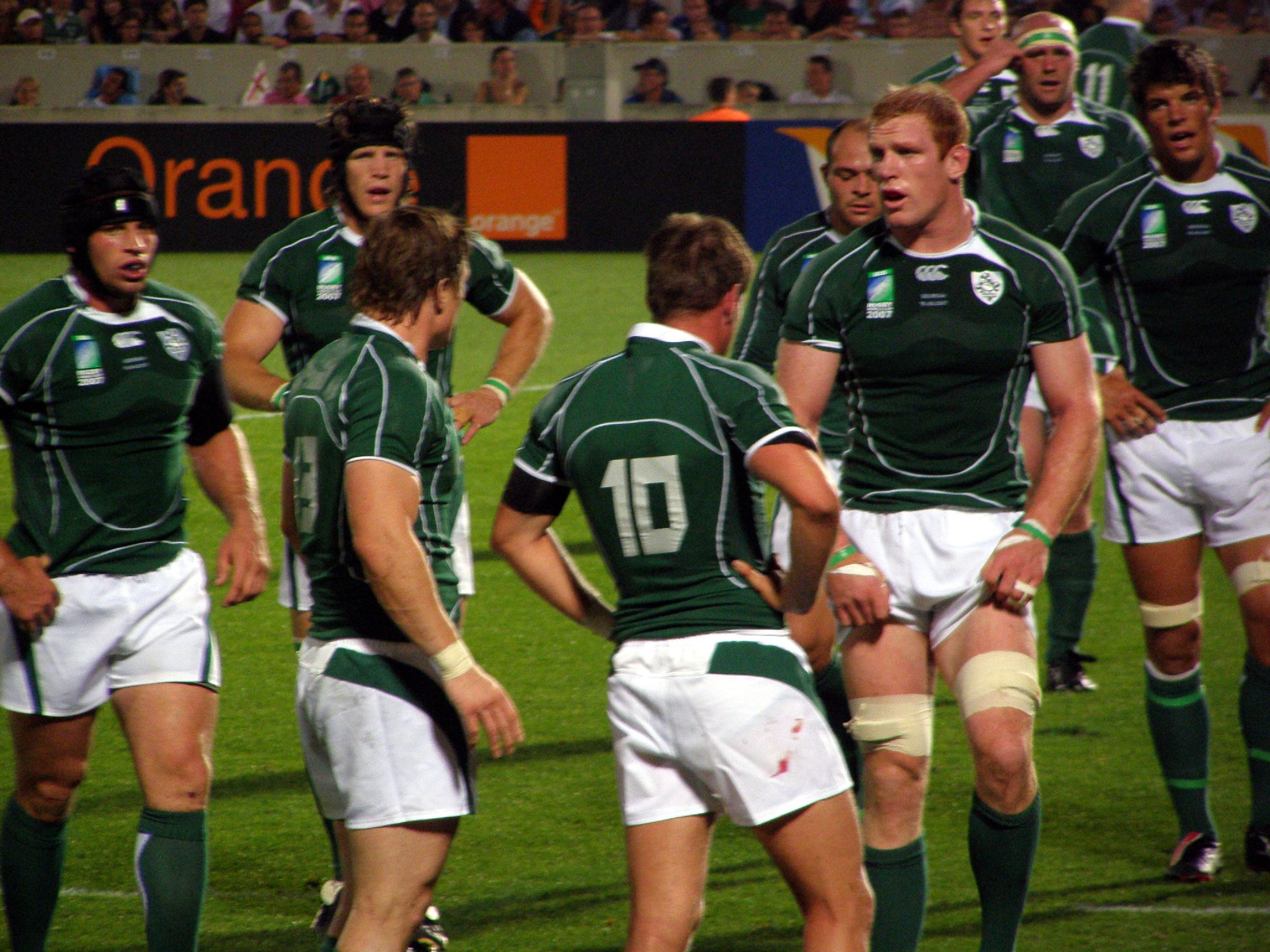
- Easterby (scrum cap, back) playing for Ireland
- Born: Simon Easterby; 21 July 1975 (age 51) Harrogate, Yorkshire, England
- Height: 1.93 m (6 ft 4 in)
- Weight: 100 kg (15 st 10 lb)
- School: Ampleforth College
- Notable relative(s): Guy Easterby (brother); Sarra Elgan (wife); Elgan Rees (father-in-law)

Rugby union career
- Position: Flanker
Senior career
Years	Team	Apps	(Points)
1998–1999	Leeds Tykes	27	(40)
1999–2003	Llanelli	83	(65)
Provincial / State sides
Years	Team	Apps	(Points)
2003–2010	Scarlets	118	(30)
2018-2019	Cowbridge R.F.C 2nds	1	(0)
International career
Years	Team	Apps	(Points)
2000–2008	Ireland	65	(40)
2005	British & Irish Lions	2	(5)
Coaching career
- Years: Team
- 2012–2014: Scarlets
- 2014–2021: Ireland (forwards)
- 2021–: Ireland (defence)
- 2025: Ireland (interim head coach)
- Correct as of 31 January 2025

Simon Easterby (born 21 July 1975) is a professional rugby union coach and former player.

== Early life ==
Easterby's father is English and his mother Irish, so he had Irish citizenship from birth. He is the younger brother of Guy Easterby, also an Ireland international. He was educated at Ampleforth College in North Yorkshire.

== Club career ==
Easterby captained the Scarlets for five consecutive seasons and played more than 50 European games, 201 games (19 tries) for Llanelli and the Scarlets. He had been part of the West Wales region since signing from Leeds Tykes in 1999. In August 2010, Easterby was forced to retire through a knee injury at the age of 35.

== International career ==
Despite being born in England, Easterby turned down the opportunity to play for England under Clive Woodward.

=== Ireland ===
Easterby made his first international appearance in a 2000 Six Nations Championship victory over Scotland at Lansdowne Road. He then became a regular in the side, being ever-present for the remainder of that Six Nations competition. Easterby then played in all three of the games during the summer tour but he missed all of the following season due to injury and did not return until the game against Scotland in September 2001. After Ireland's defeat, he lost his place but he did win a cap as a replacement against Samoa in November 2001. In 2002, he played a part in the first 10 of Ireland's games – eight as a starter – but after that, he lost his place and he did not return until playing in two tests during the summer tour of 2003 against Tonga and Samoa.

Following injuries to Paul O'Connell and Brian O'Driscoll he was named captain for the 2005 Autumn internationals.

He was virtually ever-present for Ireland since then; he has received in total 65 caps and scored 40 points. He was described as the "elder statesman among Ireland's back-row options" in 2007. Easterby played in one more Six Nations Championship in 2008, after which he retired from international rugby to concentrate on his club career.

=== British & Irish Lions ===
Easterby received a call-up to the 2005 Lions tour to New Zealand after Lawrence Dallaglio fractured his ankle in the first game. He was selected twice for the test team and scored a try in the second test in Wellington.

== Coaching ==
On retiring in 2010, Easterby was officially confirmed as the Scarlets' new defence coach and signed a two-year contract with the region. In June 2012, Easterby was confirmed as the new head coach for the Scarlets, following the departure of Nigel Davies to Gloucester.

His long association with the Scarlets came to an end in July 2014 when he was confirmed as Ireland's new forwards coach, replacing the outgoing John Plumtree.

=== Ireland ===
In 2021, he switched from Ireland's forwards coach to defence coach. He took on the role of interim head coach in December 2024 while Andy Farrell took charge of the 2025 British & Irish Lions tour to Australia. In February 2025, he took charge of his first game in the role in the opening round of the 2025 Six Nations with a 27–22 victory against England.

== Personal life ==
Easterby is married to Sarra Elgan, the daughter of ex-rugby union player Elgan Rees who played for Neath RFC, Wales and the British & Irish Lions. Former Scarlets and Wales full back Matt Cardey was best man at the wedding. Sarra Elgan Easterby is a TV presenter and a fluent Welsh speaker. Their daughter, Soffia, was born in 2007, and their son, Ffredi, was born in 2009.

In August 2014, Easterby was one of 200 public figures who were signatories to a letter to The Guardian expressing their hope that Scotland would vote to remain part of the United Kingdom in September's referendum on that issue.

== Honours ==
=== As Coach ===
- Triple Crown
  - Champion: 2025
- Millennium Trophy (England–Ireland)
  - Champion: 2025
- Centenary Quaich (Ireland–Scotland)
  - Champion: 2025
