= Sarra Elgan =

Welsh TV presenter (born 1979)

Sarra Elgan Easterby
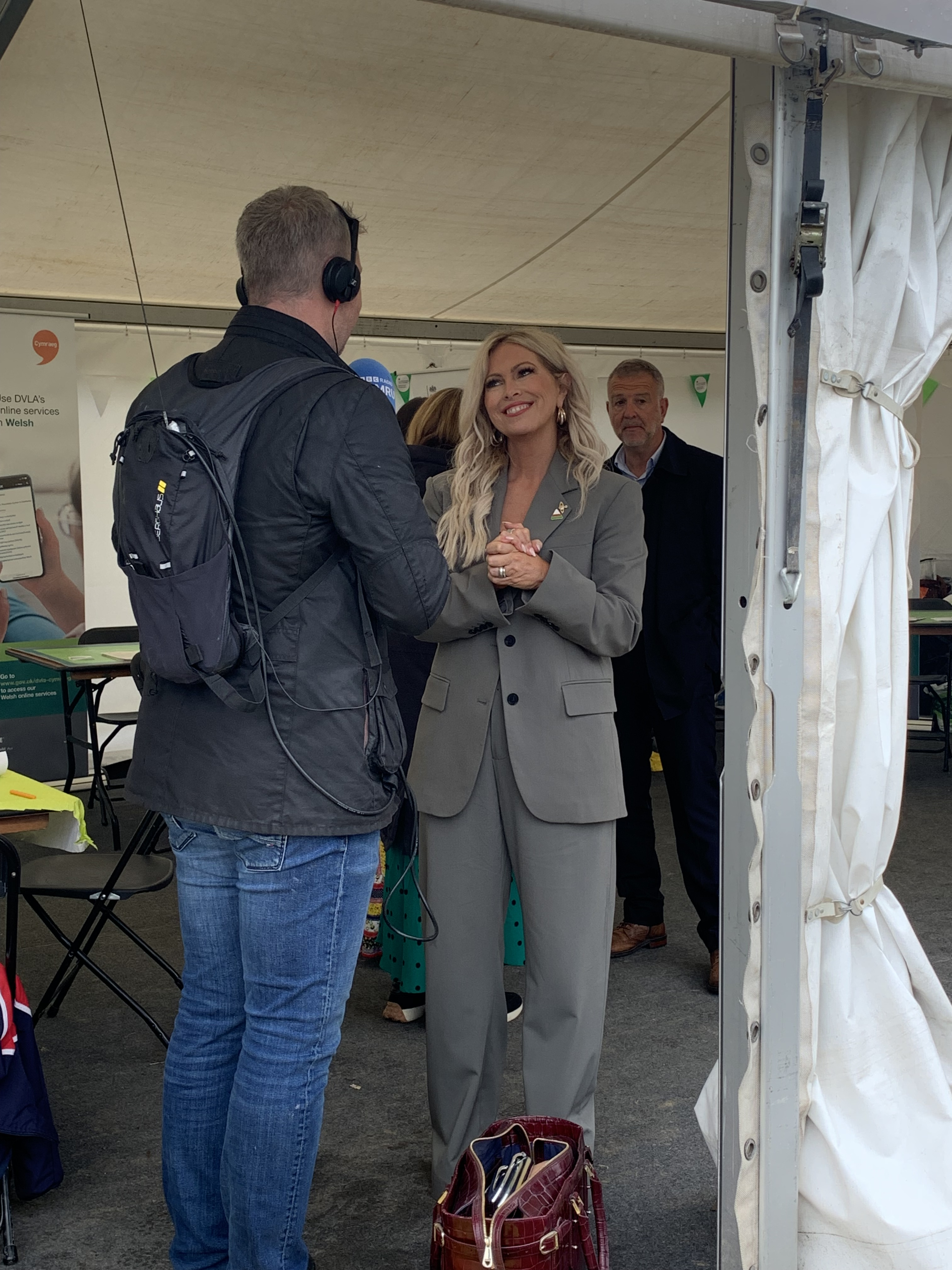
- Sarra Elgan at the Urdd National Eisteddfod 2025
- Born: Sarra Elgan Rees; 1979 (age 46–47); Neath
- Education: Trinity College, Carmarthen
- Occupations: Television presenter, actress and journalist
- Years active: 1999–present
- Employer(s): TNT Sports (current); S4C (current); BBC (former); Sky Sports (former); ESPN (former)
- Known for: Television presenter
- Spouse: Simon Easterby (m. 2005)
- Children: 2
- Parent(s): Elgan and Kathryn Rees

Sarra Elgan Easterby (born 1979) is a Welsh journalist and television presenter. She has covered rugby union for numerous media outlets.

== Early life ==
Born in Neath, she is the daughter of Kathryn Rees and former Neath RFC, Wales and British Lions rugby union player, Elgan Rees.

== Career ==
Elgan studied theatre, media and music at Trinity College, Carmarthen; soon afterwards she took a role in Welsh soap opera Pobol y Cwm. Her first presenting job was on S4C children's show Planed Plant, before presenting for CBBC. She also sang in a Welsh-language pop music group called Cic.

She began as a pitchside reporter at rugby union matches for S4C after the death of Ray Gravell in 2007. Elgan has worked as a presenter on rugby union coverage on TNT Sports and its predecessor BT Sport. She became a regular on the S4C rugby chat show Jonathan, alongside Jonathan Davies and Nigel Owens from 2018.

She has also worked for ESPN, and for Sky Sports covering the British Lions tour to South Africa in 2021.

== Personal life ==
In 2005 she married Irish former rugby player Simon Easterby. Former Scarlets and Wales full back Matt Cardey was best man at the wedding along with Simon's brother Guy. They have one daughter, Soffia born in 2007, and a son Ffredi, born in 2009. They live in Cowbridge in the Vale of Glamorgan. She and the children are Welsh speakers.
