= 2001–02 Top 16 season =

French club rugby competition

- Countries: France
- Champions: Biarritz (3rd title)
- Runners-up: Agen
- Relegated: La Rochelle and Dax

The 2001–02 Top 16 season was the top level of French club rugby in 2001–02. The competition was played by 16 team. In the first phase, two pool of 8 was Played. The first 4 of each pool was admitted to the "top 8", the tournament for the title, the other to a relegation tournament.

Biarritz won his third title, the first from 1939, beating Agen in the final

== First round ==
(3 point for victories, 2 point for drawn, 1 point for losses)

=== Pool A ===
Home \ Away	BEZ	BIA	COL	DAX	ROC	MON	STF	TOU
Béziers		18–20	49–10	33–13	40–37	37–7	19–23	31–26
Biarritz olympique	32–17		26–16	37–27	40–15	37–10	22–6	9–13
Colomiers	28–24	12–11		35–9	15–21	23–18	24–17	27–20
Dax	9–15	14–50	33–20		28–25	14–24	15–16	15–25
La Rochelle	9–15	14–27	19–20	24–16		29–18	3–8	9–10
Montauban	6–16	22–35	26–23	26–22	34–27		24–21	16–29
Stade Français	33–19	13–9	29–25	46–16	39–6	36–21		18–20
Toulouse	32–33	24–30	35–28	35–19	40–21	16–6	21–10	

Legend: Blue = home team win; Yellow = draw; Red = away team win.

Pos	Team	Pld	W	D	L	PF	PA	PD	Pts
1	Biarritz	14	11	0	3	385	221	+164	36
2	Toulouse	14	10	0	4	346	272	+74	34
3	Béziers	14	9	0	5	366	285	+81	32
4	Stade Français	14	9	0	5	315	244	+71	32
5	Colomiers	14	7	0	7	309	337	−28	28
6	Montauban	14	5	0	9	258	365	−107	24
7	La Rochelle	14	3	0	11	259	350	−91	20
8	Dax	14	2	0	12	250	411	−161	18

=== Pool B ===
Home \ Away	AGE	BOR	BOU	CAS	MON	NAR	PAU	PER
Agen		33–6	32–3	40–17	9–14	26–9	29–9	45–14
CA Bordeaux-Bègles	10–28		25–21	39–25	12–20	22–15	39–10	13–26
CS Bourgoin-Jallieu	37–20	56–25		33–21	23–3	32–19	64–6	15–23
Castres	39–15	19–22	14–29		39–30	42–20	38–26	16–20
AS Montferrand	19–27	24–6	56–23	36–19		36–25	15–19	45–14
Narbonne	21–24	22–20	31–30	47–31	24–23		42–18	34–19
Pau	17–20	18–13	29–16	21–19	27–9	46–23		3–30
Perpignan	30–16	44–26	34–10	40–27	29–21	39–25	51–17	

Legend: Blue = home team win; Yellow = draw; Red = away team win.

Pos	Team	Pld	W	D	L	PF	PA	PD	Pts
1	Perpignan	14	11	0	3	413	313	+100	36
2	Agen	14	10	0	4	364	245	+119	34
3	Montferrand	14	7	0	7	351	296	+55	28
4	Bourgoin	14	7	0	7	392	338	+54	28
5	Narbonne	14	6	0	8	357	408	−51	26
6	Pau	14	6	0	8	266	408	−142	26
7	Bordeaux-Begles	14	5	0	9	278	361	−83	24
8	Castres	14	4	0	10	366	418	−52	22

== Relegation pool ==
The teams sum to the point obtained in the first round, the point obtained in the matches played with the 4 team from other group (hone and away).

Home \ Away	BOR	CAS	COL	DAX	ROC	MON	NAR	PAU
Bègles-Bordeaux			42–19	30–12	16–12	13–19		
Castres			27–17	58–6	34–36	62–21		
Colomiers	15–16	15–15					22–6	34–14
Dax	19–11	10–25					48–12	25–16
La Rochelle	33–32	19–13					40–10	26–18
Montauban	36–19	28–24					29–28	52–34
Narbonne			27–26	48–19	45–33	44–17		
Pau			33–33	37–8	47–27	21–23		

Legend: Blue = home team win; Yellow = draw; Red = away team win.

Pos	Team	Pld	W	D	L	PF	PA	PD	Pts	Relegation
1	Montauban	22	11	0	11	483	610	−127	44	
2	Colomiers	22	9	2	11	487	517	−30	42	
3	Narbonne	22	10	0	12	577	642	−65	42	
4	Bordeaux-Begles	22	9	0	13	457	526	−69	40	
5	Castres	22	8	1	13	624	570	+54	39	
6	Pau	22	8	1	13	484	636	−152	39	
7	La Rochelle	22	8	0	14	485	565	−80	38	Relegated in Pro-D2 for next season
8	Dax	22	5	0	17	399	648	−249	32	Relegated in Pro-D2 for next season

== Top 8 ==
POOL A
30 March	Stade Français	-	Bourgoin	34 - 36
31 March	Biarritz	-	Agen	28 - 23
13 April	Agen	-	Stade Français	34 - 16
13 April	Bourgoin	-	Biarritz	12 - 16
20 April	Stade Français	-	Biarritz	20 - 20
20 April	Bourgoin	-	Agen	22 - 20
4 May	Agen	-	Bourgoin	39 - 10
4 May	Biarritz	-	Stade Français	28 - 18
11 May	Bourgoin	-	Stade Français	22 - 22
11 May	Agen	-	Biarritz	24 - 17
18 May	Stade Français	-	Agen	23 - 23
18 May	Biarritz	-	Bourgoin	48 - 25

Pos	Team	Pld	W	D	L	PF	PA	PD	Pts	Qualification
1	Biarritz	6	4	1	1	153	122	+31	15	Promoted to Semifinals
2	Agen	6	3	1	2	163	116	+47	13	Promoted to Semifinals
3	Bourgoin	6	2	1	3	127	179	−52	11	Admitted to 2002–03 Heineken Cup
4	Stade Français	6	0	3	3	133	159	−26	9	

POOL B
30 March	Béziers	-	Toulouse	16 - 26
31 March	Perpignan	-	Montferrand	21 - 27
13 April	Toulouse	-	Perpignan	30 - 14
13 April	Montferrand	-	Béziers	27 - 21
20 April	Toulouse	-	Montferrand	45 - 23
20 April	Béziers	-	Perpignan	18 - 17
4 May	Perpignan	-	Béziers	27 - 24
4 May	Montferrand	-	Toulouse	16 - 19
11 May	Toulouse	-	Béziers	44 - 15
11 May	Montferrand	-	Perpignan	21 - 12
18 May	Béziers	-	Montferrand	43 - 32
18 May	Perpignan	-	Toulouse	36 - 34

Pos	Team	Pld	W	D	L	PF	PA	PD	Pts	Qualification
1	Toulouse	6	5	0	1	198	120	+78	16	Promoted to Semifinals
2	Montferrand	6	3	0	3	146	161	−15	12	Promoted to Semifinals
3	Perpignan	6	2	0	4	127	154	−27	10	Admitted to 2002–03 Heineken Cup
4	Béziers	6	2	0	4	137	173	−36	10	

== Semifinals ==
1 June 2002

Toulouse	15 - 21	Agen
Try: mete: X.Garbajosa, C.Desbrosse; Con: Y.Delaigue; Pen: Y.Delaigue		Pen: C. Lamaison 4, F. Gelez 3

Stade de la Mosson, Montpellier

1 June 2002

Biarritz	31 - 12	Montferrand
Try: P.Bidabé, J.Roff; J.Peyrelongue; Con: J.Roff; Pen: J.Roff S. Lgg 2		Pen: G.Merceron 4

Stade Chaban-Delmas, Bordeaux

== Final ==
8 June 2002

Biarritz	25 – 22 a.e.t.	Agen
Try: Bernat-Salles; Con: Roff; Pen: Roff (5); Drop: Mazas		Try: Barrau; Con: Gelez; Pen: Gelez (5)

Stade de France, Saint-Denis
Referee: Didier Mené

FB	15	(France) Nicolas Brusque
RW	14	(France) Philippe Bernat-Salles
OC	13	(Australia) Joe Roff
IC	12	(Australia) Jack Isaac	(substituted off) 92'
LW	11	(France) Philippe Bidabé	(substituted off) 98'
FH	10	(France) Julien Peyrelongue
SH	9	(France) Nicolas Morlaes	(substituted off) 75'
N8	8	(France) Thomas Lièvremont
OF	7	(France) Christophe Milhères	(substituted off) 56'
BF	6	(France) Serge Betsen
RL	5	(France) Olivier Roumat
LL	4	(France) Jean-Philippe Versailles	(substituted off) 48'
TP	3	(France) Denis Avril	(substituted off) 96'
HK	2	(France) Jean-Michel Gonzalez (c)
LP	1	(France) Emmanuel Menieu	(substituted off) 63'
Substitutions:
HK	16	(France) Noël Curnier	(substituted in) 96'
PR	17	(France) Sotele Puleoto	(substituted in) 63'
LK	18	(France) Olivier Nauroy	(substituted in) 48'
FL	19	(France) Didier Chouchan	(substituted in) 56'
FH	20	(France) Laurent Mazas	(substituted in) 75'
CE	21	(France) Guillaume Boussès	(substituted in) 92'
WG	22	(England) Stuart Legg	(substituted in) 98'
Coach:
(France) Patrice Lagisquet

FB	15	(France) Christophe Lamaison
RW	14	(France) Pépito Elhorga
OC	13	(South Africa) Conrad Stoltz	(substituted off) 47'
IC	12	(France) Luc Lafforgue
LW	11	(France) Christophe Manas
FH	10	(France) François Gelez	(substituted off) 95'
SH	9	(France) Mathieu Barrau
N8	8	(France) Thierry Labrousse
OF	7	(France) Philippe Benetton (c)
BF	6	(France) Matthieu Lièvremont
RL	5	(France) Christophe Porcu	(substituted off) 70'
LL	4	(France) David Couzinet
TP	3	(Argentina) Omar Hasan
HK	2	(France) Jean-Baptiste Rué
LP	1	(France) Jean-Jacques Crenca
Substitutions:
HK	16	(France) Philippe Piacentini
PR	17	(France) Patrick Blanco
FL	18	(France) Xavier Guillemet
N8	19	(France) Maurice Barragué	(substituted in) 70'
SH	20	(France) François Tandonnet
CE	21	(France) Guillaume Bouic	(substituted in) 47'
CE	22	(France) Nicolas Martin	(substituted in) 95'
Coach:
(France) Christian Lanta
