= Neil Fletcher =

Neil Fletcher may refer to:

- Neil Fletcher (politician) (born 1944), British politician
- Neil Fletcher (rugby union) (born 1976), British rugby union player
