= Matthew Robinson (sportsman, born 1973) =

Welsh rugby union player

- Born: Matthew Fitz David Robinson; 2 April 1973 (age 53) Cardiff, Wales
- Height: 5 ft 9.5 in (177 cm)
- School: King's College, Taunton

Rugby union career
- Position: Wing
Senior career
Years	Team	Apps	(Points)
- Swansea
International career
Years	Team	Apps	(Points)
1999	Wales	4	(0)

Matthew Fitz David Robinson is a Welsh former professional rugby union player. A centre or wing, Robinson began his rugby career at Newport High School Old Boys before joining Swansea.

He made his debut for Wales in the 1999 Five Nations Championship match against Scotland on 6 February 1999. He won two more caps during the 1999 Five Nations and another in the first test of Wales' tour of Argentina that summer. Despite scoring four tries in a tour match against Tucumán, he never scored for Wales in a full international.

Robinson also played List A cricket for Herefordshire and a combined Minor Counties team. He also played Minor counties cricket for Herefordshire.
