= Matt Cardey =

Wales international rugby union player (born 1975)

- Born: Matthew Dane Cardey; 7 July 1975 (age 51) Papakura, New Zealand
- Height: 6 ft 1 in (1.85 m)
- Weight: 14 st 2 lb (90 kg)

Rugby union career
- Position: Full-back
Senior career
Years	Team	Apps	(Points)
?–1998	North Harbour	12	(10)
1998–1999	Newport	22	(50)
1999–2003	Llanelli	100	(180)
2003–2005	Leeds Tykes	30	(20)
International career
Years	Team	Apps	(Points)
2000	Wales	1	(0)

Matthew Dane Cardey (born 7 July 1975) is a former professional rugby union player who played as a full-back. Born in Papakura and schooled at Orewa College, New Zealand, he earned one cap for the Wales national team in 2000.

== Career ==
Cardey began his career in New Zealand with North Harbour, but suffered a broken leg in his first season and sought a move to Wales, where a former opposition coach, Graham Henry, was leading the national team. With Henry's intervention, Cardey secured a move to Newport RFC for the 1998–99 season. He played 22 times and scored 10 tries, resulting in him being named the club's player of the season before returning to New Zealand; however, upon his return, he received multiple contract offers from European clubs, including ones in England, France and Wales. He accepted the offer from Llanelli RFC as it gave him the opportunity to play in the Heineken Cup, and to connect with his Welsh roots.

Cardey scored 19 tries in his first season with Llanelli, and in February 2000, after playing for Wales 'A' in the first two matches of the Six Nations 'A', scoring in the second against Italy, he was called up to the Wales team for the inaugural Six Nations. After being named on the bench for the game against England, he was promoted to the starting XV for the following game against Scotland two weeks later, taking the place of Shane Howarth, who had been implicated in the "Grannygate" scandal along with flanker Brett Sinkinson, prop Peter Rogers and centre Jason Jones-Hughes. Cardey was also named among the players whose eligibility was called into question, but he was exonerated after providing evidence that his grandmother was born in Nantyglo. His highlight against Scotland was a try-saving tackle on Chris Paterson, but before the final game against Ireland, Cardey was ruled out with a concussion after being knocked out while playing for Llanelli against Newport. He only made one more appearance for Wales, in an uncapped match against the French Barbarians, but was on the scoresheet with a try as Wales recorded a 40–33 win. He was also part of the Wales 'A' team's tour to Canada that summer, playing in the games against Ontario President's Select and Canada A.

The 2000–01 season was far less productive for Cardey, as he scored just four tries in 26 appearances for Llanelli, though he was called up to the Wales A team again for a November 2000 fixture against South Africa, providing the assist for the first of Wales' two tries. He missed the start of the 2001–02 season with a broken wrist, but found a new role in the team as a centre, following the emergence of young full-back Barry Davies. In November 2001, in a brief return to the #15 jersey for a Heineken Cup match against Amatori & Calvisano, Cardey scored a competition record five tries in a 93–14 win for Llanelli. That December, Cardey suffered a broken leg and damage to his ankle in training; he returned to training in late March 2002 and played his first game back in early May. He scored a try away to Cardiff on 10 May 2002 as Llanelli won 28–25 to secure the 2001–02 Welsh-Scottish League title; however, he was unable to prevent Pontypridd winning 20–17 in the WRU Challenge Cup final the following week, denying Llanelli the double.

Cardey's form slipped again in the 2002–03 season, scoring just two competitive tries, both of them in a 77–13 win over Caerphilly in March 2003. His playing time was limited by injury, including keyhole surgery on his knee, and he made just 22 appearances during the season. That summer, he was believed to have been offered a contract with the newly formed Llanelli Scarlets regional side, but instead opted to move to Leeds Tykes. He retired in 2005.
