= School of Hard Knocks (TV series) =

School of Hard Knocks (SOHK) is a Sky Sports TV documentary that highlights the work of the School of Hard Knocks Charity. The format was created and developed for television by Kevin Dunford from a programme created by Ken Cowen who founded the charity in the same name in 2012.

Originally broadcast by Sky Sports, the show has recently been aired as well on Sky 1. Series 8 aired in September 2015.

The programme has seen contributions from Tony Blair, David Haye, South African stars Bryan Habana, Victor Matfield, John Smit and Schalk Burger, Phil Larder, Jason Robinson, Shaun Edwards and many more. The current series is fronted by Will Greenwood and Scott Quinnell with Paul Boross assisting as the team psychologist and motivational coach.

The first series was filmed in the Merseyside borough of Knowsley. Will Greenwood and Scott Quinnell presented the second series, filmed in Colwyn Bay, North Wales, and have continued to present the show since.

SOHK uses the game of rugby and other challenging activities to teach participants life lessons and values, initially designed to allow them to take forward steps into the world of employment. Since its inception the programme has grown to also address issues such as health, crime and citizenship. The charity has recently established 'SOHK for Schools' which seeks to help vulnerable children realise their potential and stay engaged in education.
