= Laurent Mazas =

France international rugby union player (born 1970)

- Born: 19 December 1970 (age 55) Villefranche-de-Lauragais, Haute-Garonne, France
- Height: 5 ft 9 in (175 cm)
- Weight: 190 lb (86 kg)

Rugby union career
- Position: Fly-half
International career
Years	Team	Apps	(Points)
1992–96	France	2	(0)

Laurent Mazas (born 19 December 1970) is a French former rugby union international.

Mazas, born in Villefranche-de-Lauragais, Haute-Garonne, was a youth product of FC Villefranche and after progressing into the seniors, crossed to Colomiers in 1991. He played in the French Students team that were 1992 world champions, kicking three drop-goals in the final win over New Zealand.

A mathematics teacher by profession, Mazas was capped twice as a fly-half for France. He made his debut against Argentina at Nantes in 1992 and featured again four years later against the Springboks at Bordeaux.

Mazas is often remembered for a drop-goal against SU Agen, in the last-seconds of extra time, to win Biarritz the 2001–02 Top 16 title. It was club's first top-division title for 63 years.

== See also ==
- List of France national rugby union players
