= Dafydd Jenkins (rugby union) =

Welsh rugby union player

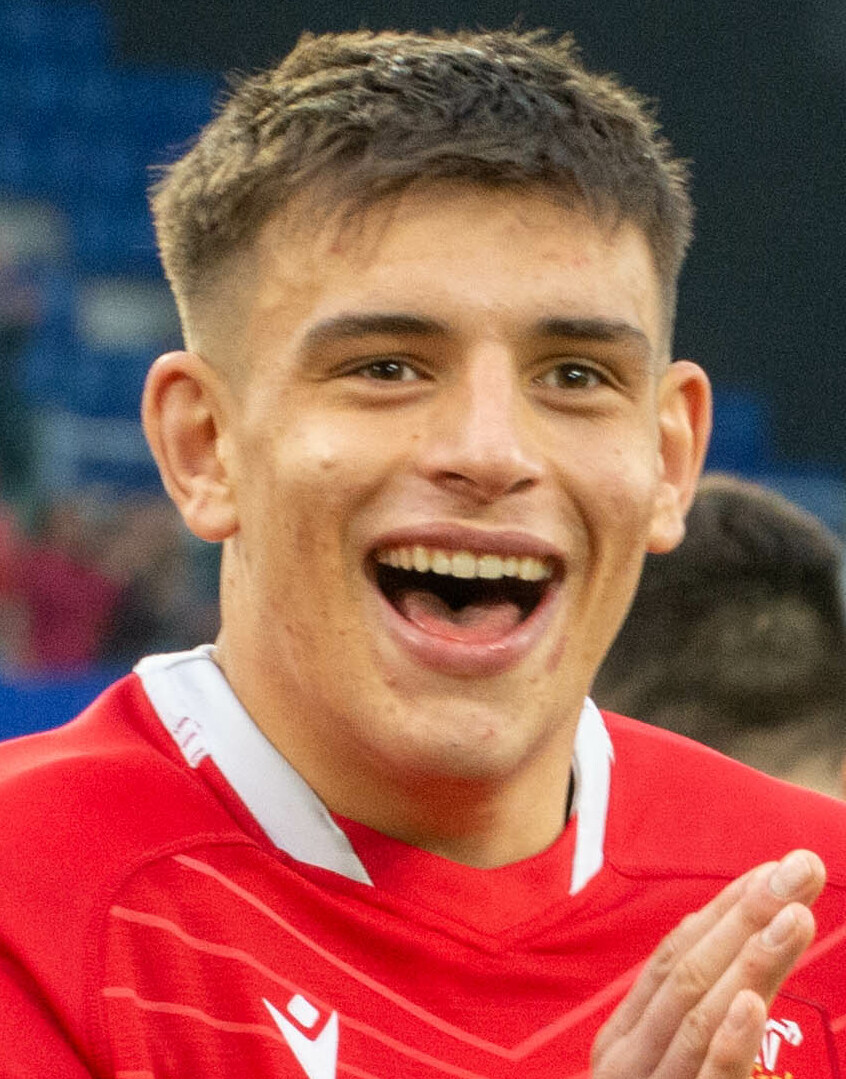
- Jenkins representing Wales during the Six Nations Championship
- Born: 5 December 2002 (age 23) Bridgend, Wales
- Height: 2.01 m (6 ft 7 in)
- Weight: 120 kg (265 lb; 18 st 13 lb)
- School: Porthcawl Comprehensive School; Hartpury College
- University: University of Exeter
- Notable relative: Hywel Jenkins (father)

Rugby union career
- Position: Lock
- Current team: Exeter Chiefs
Senior career
Years	Team	Apps	(Points)
2021–	Exeter Chiefs	90	(25)
- Correct as of 15 November 2026
International career
Years	Team	Apps	(Points)
2021–2022	Wales U20	8	(0)
2022–	Wales	33	(0)
- Correct as of 15 November 2026

Dafydd Jenkins (born 5 December 2002) is a Welsh professional rugby union player who plays as a lock for Premiership Rugby club Exeter Chiefs and has captained the Wales national team.

== Club career ==
=== Early life ===
Born in Bridgend, Jenkins began playing rugby for Porthcawl RFC juniors, where he progressed through the age groups. Jenkins attended Porthcawl Comprehensive School before transferring to Hartpury College, where he also played rugby. Prior to leaving Wales, Jenkins was part of the Ospreys academy. While playing for Hartpury, Jenkins was contacted by Exeter head coach Rob Baxter, and he linked up with their team in 2021.

=== Exeter Chiefs ===
Jenkins studies sports sciences at the University of Exeter. He has played for their rugby team in the BUCS Super Rugby tournament, and was named man of the match when Exeter won the tournament, defeating Durham 14–13, scoring a try in the final.

On 13 November 2021, Jenkins made his Exeter Chiefs debut in the Premiership Rugby Cup defeat to Bristol. On 15 January 2022, Jenkins appeared as a replacement in the Champions Cup victory over Glasgow.

Jenkins first Premiership start came in the Round 15 defeat to Wasps on 5 February 2022.

On 12 November 2022, Jenkins set the Premiership record as youngest player named captain, at 19 years and 342 days old, in a victory over London Irish.

== International career ==
=== Wales U20 ===
Jenkins was called up to the Wales under-20 squad for the first time ahead of the 2021 Six Nations Under 20s Championship, making his debut in the 25–8 victory over Italy. On 28 January 2022, Jenkins was again called into the Wales under-20 squad for the upcoming 2022 Six Nations Under 20s Championship.

=== Wales ===
On 14 November 2022, Jenkins was called up for Wales as injury cover in the 2022 Autumn Internationals.

Jenkins made his international debut on 19 November 2022, coming off the bench against Georgia.

On 17 January 2023, Jenkins was named in the Wales squad for the 2023 Six Nations Championship. He made his Six Nations debut on 4 February 2023, coming off the bench against Ireland. The following week, Jenkins made his first start for Wales, against Scotland.

On 16 January 2024, in the absence of Jac Morgan through injury, Jenkins was named captain of the Wales squad for the 2024 Six Nations Championship. In his debut as captain, Wales lost 26-27 in their opening game of the tournament. Despite losing, their performance was praised having come back from being 27-0 down.

Jenkins missed the 2024 end-of-year rugby union internationals due to knee and shoulder surgery, and the 2025 Wales rugby union tour of Japan owing to a back injury.

The 2025 Six Nations saw Jenkins' selection and subsequent return after injury. He started every match, except against Italy.

Jenkins was named in the squad for the 2025 end-of-year rugby union internationals. He started against Argentina, Japan and New Zealand.

Jenkins was named in the squad for the 2026 Six Nations by Steve Tandy.

Jenkins was ruled out of the first of fixtures in the 2026 Nations Championships due to a shoulder injury that he sustained during the PREM rugby final. In November 2026, he initially recorded 38 tackles in a 35–28 victory against New Zealand, the first time Wales had won that fixture since 1953, equalling a 19-year record of most tackles in an international fixture held by Thierry Dusautoir.

== Personal life ==
Jenkins is the son of Hywel Jenkins, who played as a back row for Swansea, Neath and London Welsh. Hywel represented Wales A and Wales in an uncapped match against the United States, but did not earn a full senior cap.
