= Elgan Rees =

British Lions & Wales international rugby union footballer

- Born: Harold Elgan Rees; 5 January 1954 (age 72) Clydach, Wales
- School: Clydach Secondary School; Cwmtawe Comprehensive School
- University: Borough Road College

Rugby union career
- Position: Wing
Amateur team(s)
Years	Team	Apps	(Points)
- Vardre RFC
–	Neath RFC		
–	Middlesex		
International career
Years	Team	Apps	(Points)
1979–1983	Wales	13	(24)
1977	British & Irish Lions	1	(0)

Harold Elgan Rees (born 5 January 1954) is a Welsh former international rugby union player.

== Rugby career ==
Rees toured with the British & Irish Lions to New Zealand in 1977, when he had yet to be capped by Wales, and South Africa in 1980 and at the time played club rugby for Neath. He made his international debut for the Lions against New Zealand at Eden Park, Auckland in August 1977 but had to wait until January 1979 for his first Wales cap, against Scotland at Murrayfield. Rees scored a try on his Welsh debut, and made his last appearance against France at the Parc des Princes in March 1983.

He played 13 times for Wales and scored six tries, in addition to his single international for the British and Irish Lions.

== Personal life ==
Rees is the father of TV presenter Sarra Elgan Rees, who is married to Irish rugby union coach Simon Easterby.
