= Didier Casadeï =

French rugby union player (born 1971)

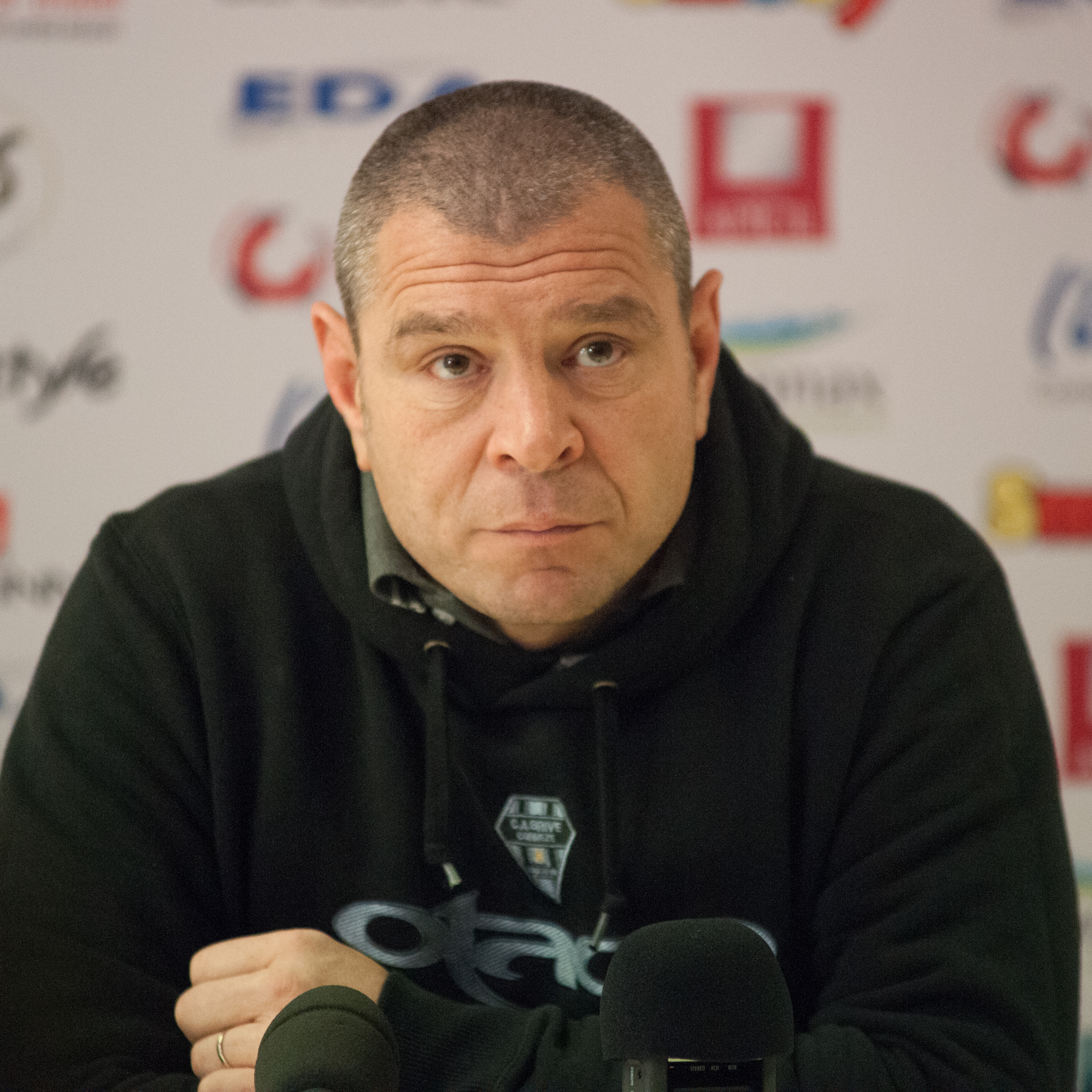
- Born: 10 April 1971 (age 55) Brive-la-Gaillarde, France
- Height: 5 ft 11 in (180 cm)
- Weight: 224 lb (102 kg)

Rugby union career
- Position: Prop
International career
Years	Team	Apps	(Points)
1997	France	3	(0)

Didier Casadeï (born 10 April 1971) is a French rugby union coach and former international.

Born in Brive-la-Gaillarde, Casadeï was a prop and made his debut for France in the 1997 Five Nations win over Scotland at Parc des Princes that secured the country's fifth grand slam. He gained two further France caps that year, first against Romania in Bucharest, then a home Test against the Springboks. At club level, Casadeï had his biggest success during his time at CA Brive, as loose-head prop in the 1997 Heineken Cup final win over the Leicester Tigers.

Casadeï, who was CA Brive's caretaker coach in 2018, took charge of CA Périgueux for the 2020–21 season, which was suspended due to Covid. He then left to be forwards coach at Racing 92, before returning to CA Périgueux in 2023.

== See also ==
- List of France national rugby union players
