= Derek Quinnell =

Welsh rugby union footballer (born 1949)

Derek Leslie Quinnell (born 22 May 1949) is a Welsh former rugby union player.

He played as a lock-forward, as a number eight and blind-side flanker.

== Early life ==
Quinnell was education at Coleshill Secondary Modern School, Llanelli. He was capped for Wales youth 1967/8 season.

== Club career ==
Quinnell first played for Llanelli RFC in 1967. He captained Llanelli in 1979–80. He played 369 times for Llanelli and scored 47 tries.

== International career ==
Quinnell made his international debuts for the Lions against New Zealand in 1971 and for Wales against France in 1972.

He earned 23 caps for Wales, from 1972 to 1980, scoring 1 try, 4 points on aggregate. He played at the Five Nations Championship in 1972, 1973, 1974, 1975, 1977, 1978 and 1979. He was a member of the winning squad in 1973 (shared), 1975, 1978 and 1979.

He was the only player in the Lions squad not to have been capped by his country when he went on the tour to New Zealand in 1971, playing in one test. He went with the Lions to New Zealand again in 1977, playing in two tests, and to South Africa in 1980, again playing in two tests.

== Post-player career ==
Quinnell is currently the President of Scarlets.

== Family ==
His three sons, Scott, Craig and Gavin went on to play top-flight professional rugby, with Craig winning caps for Wales in rugby union and Scott earning Wales caps in both union and league.

Derek's youngest son, Gavin, played professionally for the Magners League side Scarlets before an injury suffered in an October 2010 match between Llanelli RFC and Cross Keys cost him the sight in his left eye.
