= Gavin Quinnell =

Welsh rugby union footballer

- Born: Gavin Quinnell; 25 November 1983 (age 42) Llanelli, Wales
- Height: 2.01 m (6 ft 7 in)
- Weight: 138 kg (304 lb)
- Notable relative(s): Craig Quinnell (brother); Scott Quinnell (brother); Derek Quinnell (father)

Rugby union career
- Position(s): Flanker, Number eight, Lock
- Current team: Scarlets
Senior career
Years	Team	Apps	(Points)
2001–2006	Scarlets	23	(25)
2006–2008	Worcester	32	(55)
2008–2010	Viadana		
2010	Scarlets		
- Correct as of 13 February 2008

Gavin Quinnell (born 25 November 1983) is a Welsh former rugby union player. His career was ended as a result of an eye gouge in a Welsh premiership game. He played for several teams in England, Wales and Italy but finished his career with Magners league side Llanelli Scarlets. He is the son of Derek Quinnell and brother of Scott Quinnell and Craig Quinnell, all former Wales internationals.

Before joining Llanelli Scarlets he started rugby in his home village for Furnace United RFC, as a youth player where he played mainly at Number 8.

In 2006, he left the Llanelli Scarlets to join Worcester Warriors in a two-year deal. He scored a total of nine tries in 20 appearances in his first season at Sixways and quickly became a cult hero with his all-action displays.

Quinnell can play at Number 8, flanker or lock and established himself as a powerful impact player for Warrio`rs.

After not being offered a new contract by Worcester at the end of the 2007–08 season, Gavin Quinnell was forced to find a new club. He then moved on to Italian Super 10 (now Top12) club Viadana.

On 23 July 2010, Quinnell rejoined his former team Scarlets on a two-year contract.

Quinnell suffered an eye injury 30 minutes into a game against Cross Keys RFC on 2 October 2010. The following Thursday it was confirmed that, despite the best efforts of surgeons, he had lost the sight in his left eye. A Cross Keys player was arrested on suspicion of assault but following investigation by Gwent Police criminal charges were not pursued.
