= Stuart Legg (rugby union) =

English rugby union player

- Born: Stuart James Legg; 27 September 1975 (age 51) Solihull
- Height: 1.85 m (6 ft 1 in)
- Weight: 89 kg (14 st 0 lb)
- School: Solihull School
- University: Durham University

Rugby union career
- Position: Full-back
Senior career
Years	Team	Apps	(Points)
1997–2000	Newcastle Falcons	54	(99)

Stuart James Legg (born 27 September 1975) is an English former rugby union footballer who played 54 games for Newcastle Falcons.

== Early life ==
Legg developed his rugby at Solihull School. He matriculated at Durham University in 1994 and represented the university rugby team, where he was a teammate of Will Greenwood.

== Career ==
After university, Legg turned professional with Newcastle, making his debut against Bath in the opening match of the 1997–98 season. He played 54 minutes and scored a try. Legg soon established himself as Newcastle's first-choice full-back, ahead of the more experienced Tim Stimpson, who was subsequently placed on the transfer list. He made 21 appearances during the 1997–98 season, as Newcastle won the league title in their first season following promotion from National Division Two.

By the 1999–2000 season, Legg's first-team opportunities had become more limited, and he made ten starts. He subsequently joined Biarritz, winning the French championship in the 2001–02 season. He joined Treviso the following season and played for the club for a further four years before retiring.
