= IRL eligibility rules =

Rules for rugby league

As the governing body of rugby league, the International Rugby League (IRL) is responsible for maintaining and implementing rules that determine whether a rugby league player is eligible to represent a particular country in officially recognised international matches and tournaments.

== Eligibility rules ==
The IRL eligibility rules outline that a player is eligible to represent:

- the nation in which they were born;
- the nation in which either of their parents were born;
- the nation in which any of their grandparents were born;
- the nation in which they have resided for each of the preceding 60 months (i.e. 5 years).

Eligibility can be established through a biological or adoptive parent.

=== Previous eligibility system ===
Prior to October 2016, players who were eligible for more than one nation were entitled to elect which nation they wished to represent. A player was considered to have elected a nation by playing in a senior international match. Players were permitted to change their elected nation once every two years or at the end of the next Rugby League World Cup, whichever was sooner.

At this time, the residency period through which a player could become eligible for a nation was 36 months (i.e. 3 years).

=== 2016 overhaul: introduction of the tier system ===
Taking effect on 1 October 2016, the IRL introduced a tier system for classifying its member nations:

- Tier 1: Australia, New Zealand, and England (including Great Britain) (Note: Since May 2021, France are considered a tier 1 nation for wheelchair rugby league only.)
- Tier 2: All other full members of the IRL
- Tier 3: Affiliate and observer members of the IRL

Under this system, players can elect to represent both a tier 1 nation and a tier 2 or 3 nation. Players are free to change between their elected nations without a stand-down period or similar (this rule was altered in February 2020). Players can change their elected tier 2 or 3 nation once every four years, but are not permitted to change their tier 1 nation (except between England and Great Britain).

In addition, the residency criteria was increased to 60 months (i.e. 5 years).

=== 2020 refinements ===
Several amendments to the eligibility rules were announced in February 2020, taking immediate effect. Players are now permitted to represent only one nation in a calendar year, and only one nation at an IRL tournament, such as the Rugby League World Cup and the associated qualifying tournament. The act of electing a nation was changed to include being selected in a 19-man gameday squad for a senior international match or in a final squad for a rugby league nines tournament. It remains that selection in a junior (e.g. Under-20s), student, or any other representative match does not constitute electing a nation.

=== 2026 changes for the women's game ===
The tiering system was scrapped for the women's game in March 2026 making it possible for women to play for more than one of the former tier 1 countries; Australia, England and New Zealand. The restriction on appearing for more than one nation in a year remains.

== Breaches, controversies, and notable cases ==
In 2006, Australian-born Nathan Fien represented New Zealand in two matches of the 2006 Tri-Nations, claiming to be eligible through his grandmother. It was subsequently discovered that his New Zealand-born ancestor was, in fact, his great-grandmother, which did not establish his eligibility. He was banned from competing in the rest of the tournament and New Zealand was stripped of the points gained for their win against Great Britain. The scandal was known as "Grannygate". Fien played a further 20 Tests for New Zealand after completing his three-year residency period in October 2007 and becoming eligible.

In 2008, the IRL (then known as the RLIF) ruled that Fuifui Moimoi and Taniela Tuiaki were not eligible to represent Tonga at the 2008 Rugby League World Cup as the rules at the time dictated that players were only permitted to change nations once every two years. Both players had represented Tonga in 2006 and New Zealand in 2007, and wanted to switch back to Tonga for the tournament after they were not selected by New Zealand. The decision was challenged in the Supreme Court of New South Wales, with Justice Richard Weeks White ruling that Moimoi and Tuiaki were to be permitted to play for Tonga from 12 November 2008 onwards, exactly two years after their most recent match for Tonga. Neither player appeared at the tournament as Tonga was eliminated prior to that date. Moimoi was subsequently reselected by New Zealand in 2009.

In 2012, Adrian Morley revealed in his autobiography Moz that his brother Chris had lied about their grandmother's origins in order to represent Wales, which he did on 13 occasions between 1996 and 2006. Adrian had reportedly also considered representing Wales, although this did not eventuate. The RLIF commented in November 2012: "The procedures surrounding international eligibility are no longer the same as when Chris Morley was playing, and there have been regular reviews of the sanctioning process across all levels of the game. All player eligibility is checked and verified before any player can be included in a 17-man squad for an official competition or international fixture."

New Zealand and Cook Islands representative Marata Niukore was granted an exemption by the IRL to appear at the 2021 Rugby League World Cup (which was held in 2022 due to the COVID-19 pandemic) after inadvertently making himself ineligible for both nations. The rule amendments introduced in February 2020 dictate that Niukore should have been tied to the Cook Islands for the tournament after playing in their qualifying matches in 2019, however, he became tied to New Zealand for the 2022 calendar year after playing in a one-off international match prior to the tournament. He ultimately represented New Zealand at the tournament.

In May 2025, the IRL approved an application by AJ Brimson to switch his Tier 1 nation from Australia to England. Brimson had represented Australia at the 2019 Rugby League World Cup 9s, which was considered to have captured his allegiance under the February 2020 rule amendments. In announcing their decision, the IRL noted that Brimson had only represented Australia in 9s, not a senior international match, and that the World Cup 9s had effectively been discontinued since its only staging in 2019.

== Response ==
In comparison to other international sports, the IRL's previous eligibility rules, which permitted players to change nations every two years, were described as "an outlier in terms of how little impediment there was to players representing more than one country." The current tier system has been described as a farce that has cheapened international tournaments.

IRL development officer Tas Baitieri stated in September 2016 that the tier system was designed to produce higher quality and more balanced international tournaments. Dual eligible players who are not selected by their tier 1 nation can represent tier 2 and 3 nations without affecting their chances of being reselected by their tier 1 nation, strengthening the tier 2 and 3 nations in the interim. When the system was introduced, the most recent win by a tier 2 or 3 nation over a tier 1 nation was Wales's 18–16 win over England in 1995. In the 3 years following, Tonga defeated New Zealand, Great Britain, and Australia, while Fiji and Papua New Guinea defeated New Zealand and Great Britain, respectively.

The current eligibility system has also been praised for allowing members of diaspora populations to represent their multiple national identities. Under the previous system, many dual eligible players were conflicted between representing their cultural heritage and the financial benefits of representing tier 1 nations, particularly Australia and its domestic State of Origin series. As the Australian Rugby League Commission's eligibility rules for State of Origin require players to be eligible for Australia, dual eligible players are now able to be selected for State of Origin while representing a tier 2 or 3 nation.
