= Ian Boobyer =

Welsh rugby union player (born 1971)

Ian Boobyer (born 14 July 1971) is a Welsh former rugby union player who played as a flanker. His brothers, twins Neil and Roddy, were also rugby players. Born in Bridgend, he played for Tondu, Neath, Maesteg, Llandovery, Llanelli and Bridgend Sports, and was part of the Llanelli Scarlets regional side at the advent of regional rugby in Wales in 2003.
