= Scott Quinnell =

British Lions & Wales international dual-code rugby footballer

- Born: Leon Scott Quinnell; 20 August 1972 (age 54) Morriston, Swansea, Glamorgan, Wales
- Height: 6 ft 3 in (1.91 m)
- Weight: 18 st 13 lb (120 kg)
- School: Graig Comprehensive School
- Notable relative(s): Derek Quinnell (father); Craig Quinnell (brother); Gavin Quinnell (brother); Barry John (uncle)

Rugby union career
- Position: No. 8
Senior career
Years	Team	Apps	(Points)
1990–1994	Llanelli	146	(160)
1996–1998	Richmond	44	(175)
1998–2005	Llanelli Scarlets	59	(60)
International career
Years	Team	Apps	(Points)
1993–2002	Wales	52	(55)
1997, 2001	British & Irish Lions	3	(5)
- Rugby league career

Playing information
- Position: Prop, Second-row
Club
Years	Team	Pld	T	G	FG	P
1994–96	Wigan	41	18			72
Representative
Years	Team	Pld	T	G	FG	P
1995	Wales	2				0

Scott Quinnell (born 20 August 1972) is a Welsh former rugby union and rugby league footballer who played in the 1990s and 2000s. He was a number eight for Wales, Llanelli RFC, Llanelli Scarlets, Richmond and the British & Irish Lions in rugby union. He won 52 caps for Wales (seven as captain) and three for the Lions, and scored 11 international tries for Wales and one for the Lions.

In 1994 he changed codes to rugby league, transferring from Llanelli RFC to Wigan. He played for two seasons before returning to rugby union, winning a league championship with Wigan and two international caps for Wales.

== Early life ==
Quinnell was born in Morriston, Swansea, Glamorgan, Wales. He is the son of former Welsh international Derek Quinnell. His two brothers Craig and Gavin played professional rugby union. Gavin lost the sight in one eye after an incident in a 2010 match. The brothers are also nephews of Welsh international Barry John, and Quinnell's godfather was Mervyn Davies.

== Playing career ==
Quinnell first joined the Llanelli juniors aged 8 and he made his début as an 18-year-old back in 1990 against Pen-y-groes. He went on to represent Llanelli on 146 occasions, scoring 69 tries.

Quinnell first played for Wales as a blindside flanker in a 26–24 defeat against Canada in 1993. He was part of the 1994 Five Nations-winning Welsh team and was man of the match in Wales' 24–15 victory over France that year with a try and a breakaway to set up another try.

=== Rugby league ===
He switched to rugby league in 1994, joining Wigan. He stayed with Wigan for two years, and during this time he won the league. Quinnell played loose forward in Wigan's 25–16 victory over St. Helens in the 1996 Regal Trophy final. He also represented Wales in the 1995 Rugby League World Cup. He said that the toughest game of rugby he ever played was the quarter-final against Western Samoa. Wales went out to England 25–10 in the semi-finals.

=== Return to rugby union ===
Quinnell returned to rugby union with Richmond in 1996. He was selected for the 1997 Lions tour of South Africa. but a double hernia operation forced him to leave the tour and he was replaced by Tony Diprose.

He returned to Llanelli in 1998. During the 1998–99 season he did no conditioning work at all as he had rheumatoid arthritis in his left knee. For seven years he played with the condition that seemed likely to end his career.

He was part of a Wales team that won eight straight games before the 1999 World Cup and then reached the World Cup quarter-finals, when they went out 24–9 to the eventual winners Australia. He captained Wales for the first time in a 23–13 defeat by South Africa at the Millennium Stadium. Quinnell played his last game for Wales as a replacement in a 32–21 win over Canada in 2002 after winning 52 caps.

He was again selected for the 2001 Lions tour to Australia where he played in all three tests, and scored a try in the first test in Brisbane.

After the Welsh domestic game went regional in 2003, he appeared 59 times for the Scarlets, scoring 32 tries. He was part of the Llanelli Scarlets team that won the Celtic League title in 2004.

Quinnell announced his retirement from rugby union at the end of the 2004–05 season in order to concentrate on his role as coach of the Llanelli RFC Welsh Premier Division team. A hand injury suffered in March 2005 forced him to end his career a few weeks prematurely. He played his final game in a testimonial match with fellow retiree Rob Howley at the Millennium Stadium. Quinnell's Britain & Ireland selection lost 57–67 to Howley's Rest of the World side.

== After retirement ==
Quinnell currently regularly appears as a commentator and pundit on a number of Sky Sports televised rugby matches. He is also a People's Postcode Lottery ambassador and appears on the adverts. He is a co-presenter and coach (with Will Greenwood) of Sky's School of Hard Knocks TV series. He has had a recurring guest role as himself in the Sky 1 TV comedy series Stella. In 2017 he co-wrote (with psychologist Paul Boross) the book Leader On The Pitch, with a foreword written by Sir Clive Woodward.

In 2020, he participated in Iaith ar Daith ('Language Road Trip'), a show for S4C where he and several other celebrities learned Welsh, broadcast in April 2020. An extra episode, Iaith ar Daith 'Dolig ('Language Road Trip: Christmas') was broadcast at the end of 2020, interviewing each of the celebrities about whether they were still making use of their Welsh and the opportunities they had had to use Welsh during lockdown.

== Personal life ==
Quinnell is married to Nicola, and the couple have three children. Having lived all of his life in Llanelli, in early 2009 in light of his increased media commitments, the family moved to Kenilworth, Warwickshire, although they have since moved back to South Wales to a smallholding near Usk.

Quinnell is dyslexic, but was not diagnosed until his early 30s, when his lack of ability to read and write was correctly diagnosed. Having undertaken a series of therapies to resolve the condition, as of 2010, Quinnell is a popular speaker on the matter. He has represented the Welsh Dyslexia Project, and also completed an autobiography as part of the Accent Press Quick Reads series.

In August 2007 Quinnell was treated for serious injuries after slipping whilst entering a shower and falling through a glass shower door at his then home near Llanelli. He was taken to West Wales General Hospital in Carmarthen with a severed right triceps, and glass embedded in his right arm, hand and knee.
