= Steve White-Cooper =

England international rugby union player

- Born: William Robert Stephen White-Cooper; 15 July 1974 (age 52) Cape Town

Rugby union career
- Position: Flanker
Senior career
Years	Team	Apps	(Points)
1997–2002	Harlequin F.C.	103	(40)
International career
Years	Team	Apps	(Points)
2001-2002	England A		
2001	England	2	(Pts:0)

Steve White-Cooper (born 15 July 1974) is a former rugby union international who represented Harlequins FC and England.

== Early life ==
Steve White-Cooper was born on 15 July 1974 in Cape Town, South Africa. He moved to the United Kingdom at the age of eight, attending Canford School in Dorset.

== Rugby union career ==
White-Cooper joined Harlequins straight from school, turning professional on completing his university degree. He enjoyed five seasons of Premiership rugby with Harlequins F.C, which included winning the 2001 European Parker Pen Shield beating RC Narbonne 42-33 and making the final of Tetley Bitter Cup Final 2001 with a last-minute defeat against Newcastle Falcons 27-30.

White-Cooper made his England A debut versus Wales A on 3 February 2001 at the Racecourse Ground, Wrexham in a 19-19 draw. He made his full international debut on 9 June 2001 at Sports Complex, Burnaby Lake in the Canada vs England match. Of the two matches he played for his national side he was on the winning side on both occasions. He played his final match for England on 16 June 2001 at Boxer Stadium, San Francisco in the United States of America vs England match.

White-Cooper competed for the England Sevens team at the 2002 London Sevens.

== Post-rugby life ==
After retiring from professional rugby in 2002, White-Cooper worked for an Executive Search firm specialising in the Financial Services. Following this, he founded add-victor in 2012, a corporate recruitment agency.
