= Grandfather rule =

Rule allowing sports players to play for country of their ancestors

The grandfather rule, in sports which usually only permit participants to play for the team of their country of birth, is an exception which gives participants the option to play for the country of any of their ancestors up to the grandparents. Despite the common name for the rule, grandparents of either sex can be invoked equally and it is sometimes referred to as the grandparent rule or the granny rule.

== Examples ==
=== Rugby league ===
In rugby league, the RLIF reiterated in 2008 that a player may represent a country if it is their country, or the country of their parents or any of their grandparents' birth.

=== Rugby union ===
In rugby union, regulation 8.1 of World Rugby stipulates that:

a Player may only play for the [Team] (...) of the country with which the Player has a genuine, close, credible and established national link in which: (a) he was born; or (b) one parent or grandparent was born; or (...)

The term "grandparent" was at one time defined to include only blood grandparents, even for individuals who were legally adopted. However, World Rugby's current interpretation of its regulations accounts for cases in which a player, or his or her blood parent, was adopted:

Unless a Player has been adopted in accordance with the formal, legal requirements of the country concerned, the application of this criterion will be based on a Player's blood parent. When a Player has been formally adopted in accordance with the applicable legal requirements of the country concerned, the birth place of the Player's blood parent will no longer be relevant for the purposes of establishing the Player's eligibility pursuant to Regulation 8.1(b). The relevant parent will be the parent that has formally and legally adopted the Player. In such circumstances, the relevant grandparents for the purposes of establishing a Player's eligibility pursuant to Regulation 8.1(b) will be the Player's adoptive rather than blood grandparents. It is not possible under Regulation 8.1(b) to assume eligibility via blood grandparents if a Player has been formally and legally adopted. In the event that one of the Player's blood parents has been adopted, the relevant grandparents for the purpose of establishing that Player's eligibility pursuant to Regulation 8.1(b) will be the Player's blood parent's adoptive parents. The term "parent" in the Regulations is limited to either a blood parent or a parent that has formally adopted a Player in accordance with the applicable legal requirements of the country concerned.

This exception is also incorporated directly into certain national regulations which govern the club-level teams from that country, as shown by regulation 9.14.2.1 of the Irish Rugby Football Union:

The following are the registered players who are eligible to play in the All Ireland League and Cup: (i) A Player who qualifies to play for Ireland under World Rugby Regulations. (...)

=== Association football ===
In association football, this rule can be found at the international level in the statutes of the Fédération Internationale de Football Association (FIFA), in articles 6 and 7. The former states:

if, in addition to having the relevant nationality, he fulfils at least one of the following conditions: a) He was born on the territory of the relevant Association; b) His biological mother or biological father was born on the territory of the relevant Association; c) His grandmother or grandfather was born on the territory of the relevant Association; (...)

Despite the usage of masculine pronouns, the rule also applies to female players. Note that unlike World Rugby, which now substitutes adoptive parents for birth parents in determining national team eligibility, FIFA continues to use only biological relations for this purpose.

Among the most notable countries to have availed of the "granny rule" is the Republic of Ireland, where the wide spread of the Irish diaspora left large numbers of potential recruits, especially in the United Kingdom. Jack Charlton (manager 1986–96) was especially noted for recruiting English-born footballers who had Irish ancestry. Many German-born players who have Turkish ancestry have chosen to play for Turkey. This has partly been due to Germany's formerly strict rules on dual citizenship that, prior to a 2024 reform, forced German-Turks to choose whether to have German or Turkish citizenship by the age of 23.

=== Baseball and softball ===
The World Baseball Softball Confederation (WBSC), which governs both baseball and softball internationally, requires nationality as a precondition for national team selection, but does not mention the grandparent rule in its bylaws. The method by which a player obtains legal nationality is irrelevant to national team eligibility, at least from the WBSC's perspective. The relevant bylaw uses the language "country or territory", thereby encompassing both fully sovereign states and dependent territories.

=== Basketball ===
FIBA, the international governing body for basketball, has eligibility rules largely similar to those of the WBSC. Nationality is a precondition for national team selection, and the grandparent rule is generally not employed. The method by which a player obtains citizenship is usually irrelevant to national team eligibility. The only use of the grandparent rule is to determine eligibility to represent the national team of a country's dependent territory, with two notable examples being those of Puerto Rico and the US Virgin Islands, both US insular areas with their own national federations, and whose native-born residents are US citizens by birth.

FIBA, however, has a unique restriction on participation of naturalised players in its official competitions that has no parallel in association football, either rugby code, or baseball and softball. In FIBA competitions, a national team can have no more than one player on its roster who acquired that country's nationality by any means after reaching age 16. This restriction also applies to individuals who had the right to a second nationality at birth, but did not exercise that right until age 16 or later. The latter is relevant to natives of Northern Ireland, who have both British citizenship and the right to Irish citizenship by birth.

=== Cricket ===
The International Cricket Council, which governs international play in cricket, has eligibility rules broadly similar to rugby union. A player may qualify for a national team by birth, nationality, or a minimum of three years of residency in the territory governed by a specific federation. The grandparent rule is not used.

== Effects on teams ==
A controversial rule, sports fans often debate whether this rule weakens smaller countries by creating the temptation for the best players to abandon their native country and declare elsewhere in the hopes of greater glory, or if on the contrary it helps smaller countries by giving them access to a broader range of players who wouldn't typically be considered to be picked for their country of birth.

== See also ==
- Grannygate
