= Hywel Jenkins =

Welsh rugby union player (born 1976)

- Born: 7 March 1976 (age 50) Caerphilly, Wales
- Height: 193 cm (6 ft 4 in)
- Weight: 110 kg (243 lb)
- Notable relative: Dafydd Jenkins (son)

Rugby union career
- Position: Back row
Senior career
Years	Team	Apps	(Points)
1996–2000	Llanelli	102	(130)
2000–2002	Swansea	38	(15)
2002–2006	Neath		
2007	Ebbw Vale		
2007–2008	London Welsh		
2008–2010	Bedwas	28	(20)
International career
Years	Team	Apps	(Points)
- Wales U19
- Wales U21
2000	Wales A	1	(0)

Hywel Jenkins (born 7 March 1976) is a Welsh former professional rugby union player who played as a back row forward for Llanelli, Swansea, Neath, Ebbw Vale, London Welsh and Bedwas. He was also a youth international for Wales and earned one cap for Wales A on a development tour to Canada in 2000; he was sent home from the tour after the third game for violating a curfew. He also played for the Wales senior team once, in an uncapped match against the United States ahead of the 1999 Rugby World Cup.

In June 2002, Jenkins was charged with the rape of a woman at a house party in Bridgend. He maintained his innocence, and the Crown Prosecution Service dropped the case the following month, prompting Jenkins to consider his own legal action.

Jenkins' son, Dafydd, is also a professional rugby union player who plays as a lock for Exeter Chiefs and Wales.
