= David Llewellyn (rugby union) =

Wales international rugby union footballer

- Born: David Stephen Llewellyn; 29 September 1970 (age 56) Bedwellty, Wales
- Height: 178 cm (5 ft 10 in)
- Weight: 91 kg (14 st 5 lb)
- School: Tredegar Comprehensive

Rugby union career
- Position: Scrum-half
Amateur team(s)
Years	Team	Apps	(Points)
1990-2003	Newport RFC	95	(175)
–	Neath RFC		
–	Ebbw Vale RFC		
–	Plymouth Albion		
–	Barbarian F.C.		
International career
Years	Team	Apps	(Points)
1998–1999	Wales	4	(5)

David Stephen "Dai" Llewellyn (born 29 September 1970) is a former Wales international rugby union player. He played his club rugby for Ebbw Vale, Newport and Neath and was part of the Wales squad for the 1999 World Cup where he scored a try.

Llewellyn won four caps for Wales between 1998 and 1999. He featured a further twelve times on the bench for his country. Llewellyn played in the last Five Nations tournament and made one appearance in the 1999 Rugby World Cup as a replacement against Japan.
