= Octavio Bartolucci =

Argentine rugby union footballer

- Born: 8 March 1975 (age 51) Rosario, Santa Fe, Argentina
- Height: 6 ft 5 in (1.96 m)
- Weight: 198 lb (14.1 st)

Rugby union career
- Position: Wing
Senior career
Years	Team	Apps	(Points)
1990-2000	CA Rosario		
2000-2001	Agen		
2001-02	Leeds Carnegie		
2002-2009	CA Rosario		
International career
Years	Team	Apps	(Points)
1996-2003	Argentina	20	(45)

Octavio Bartolucci (born 8 March 1975) is an Argentine rugby union footballer. He plays as a wing.

He played for Club Atlético del Rosario, from 1993/94 to 1999/2000, in Argentina. He moved afterwards to SU Agen (2000/01), in France, and to Leeds Carnegie (2001/02), in England. He returned to Club Atlético del Rosario, where he played the rest of his career, from 2001/02 to 2008/09.

Bartolucci had 20 caps for Argentina, scoring 9 tries, 45 points in aggregate, from 1996 to 2003. He participated in the 1999 Rugby World Cup finals, playing in two matches. He won the South American Rugby Championship in 1998 and 2003. He missed the 2003 Rugby World Cup because of an injury to the Achilles heel.
