= Craig Quinnell =

Wales international rugby union footballer

- Born: Jonathan Craig Quinnell; 9 July 1975 (age 51) Swansea, Wales
- Height: 6 ft 6 in (1.98 m)
- Weight: 20 st 6 lb (130 kg)
- Notable relative(s): Gavin Quinnell (brother); Scott Quinnell (brother); Derek Quinnell (father)

Rugby union career
- Position: Lock
Youth career
- Llanelli RFC
Senior career
Years	Team	Apps	(Points)
- Llanelli
1996–1999	Richmond		
1999–2002	Cardiff	54	(54)
–	Saracens		
–	Worcester		
–	Cardiff Blues		
International career
Years	Team	Apps	(Points)
1995–2002	Wales	32	(25)

Craig Quinnell (born 9 July 1975) is a Welsh former rugby union player.

Quinnell began his senior career with Llanelli and after that joined Richmond for two years. He played 54 games for Cardiff RFC between 1999 and 2002, after which he left to join English club Saracens and, for a short while, Worcester but was among the earliest recruits to the rebranded Cardiff Blues, playing for three seasons until his injury-enforced retirement.

Quinnell won his first international cap in 1995, playing as a flanker against Fiji. He earned a total of 32 international caps, the majority in the second row. He was a member of Wales' World Cup squad in 1999 and toured with Wales to Argentina, also in 1999, and Japan two years later.

On 13 April 2006, Quinnell announced his retirement from professional rugby. This came following a neck injury sustained during a game for the Cardiff Blues against Glasgow Warriors. Doctors told him that he risked being in a wheelchair if he played rugby again.

Craig Quinnell is the son of former Welsh international Derek Quinnell and the younger brother of Scott Quinnell. The youngest Quinnell brother, Gavin, played professionally for the Scarlets.
