= Grannygate =

Two sporting scandals regarding national team eligibility

Grannygate is the name given to several different sporting scandals, typically regarding eligibility of players for national teams. A rugby union version of Grannygate occurred in Wales in March 2000, a rugby league version occurred in New Zealand in 2006.

== Rugby union ==
In rugby union, Grannygate was a scandal over the eligibility of international players which occurred in March 2000. The rules of World Rugby, which was known in 2000 as the International Rugby Board (IRB), allow a player to qualify to play for a country based on his parents' or grandparents' country of birth. Alternatively a player can qualify based on residency in a country for a defined number of years.

The players involved in Grannygate were:

- Shane Howarth, former New Zealand international who gained 19 caps for Wales before being banned as he had no Welsh qualification.
- Brett Sinkinson, New Zealand born flanker (though he never played for New Zealand) who played for Wales whilst ineligible. He was barred from playing for Wales but later returned to the Wales team after qualifying through the residency rules and achieved a total of 20 caps.
- Dave Hilton, born in Bristol (though he never played for England) claimed Scottish qualification through his grandfather. He played 41 times for Scotland before it was revealed his grandfather was born in England and he was therefore ineligible to play for Scotland. He played one more international for Scotland after qualifying through residency.

Three other Welsh players were initially implicated but exonerated as they had valid Welsh qualifications and had not played for other countries: Australian Jason Jones-Hughes, New Zealander Matt Cardey and English-born Peter Rogers who had played club rugby in South Africa and Wales. A fourth player, Colin Charvis, had been first capped for Wales in 1996 while apparently ineligible, but by the time the scandal broke he had completed the required 3-year residency period and no further action was taken.

== Rugby league ==
The term Grannygate was used of Nathan Fien who played rugby league for New Zealand in the 2006 Rugby League Tri-Nations, despite not being qualified to do so. Fien had played State of Origin for the Queensland Maroons in 2001 but was seeking permission to play for the Kiwis in the second game of the 2006 Tri-Nations. Fien claimed eligibility based on the grandparent rule. Fien played in the losing Kiwi team in Melbourne and in the winning Kiwi team against Great Britain in New Zealand. He was later banned after The Daily Telegraph in Sydney revealed that Fien was claiming eligibility based upon a great-grandmother and not a grandmother. A further consequence was that the Kiwis were forced to forfeit the two competitions points gained for the victory against the Lions which further hampered the Kiwis' efforts to make the final. Fien became eligible to play for the Kiwis in 2007 due to residency rules via his tenure with the Auckland Warriors in the NRL.

The effect of the incident on international rugby league was a public slanging match between the Australian Rugby League (ARL) and the New Zealand Rugby League (NZRL). Selwyn Bennett, the chairman of the NZRL, resigned over the incident and two weeks later Andrew Chalmers announced that he would also leave his job with a year still to run on his contract. Graham Lowe, a former Kiwi coach, tabled a failed bid to have the whole NZRL replaced. Bennett has since claimed that the incident was good for international rugby league, accusing ARL chief executive, Geoff Carr, of knowing about Fien's ineligibility before it was revealed publicly. Bennett said: "Not only Geoff Carr but the secretary at the ARL Colin Love looked into it. The only one who didn't know anything seemed to be me."

== See also ==
- List of scandals with "-gate" suffix
- List of sporting scandals
- Grandfather rule
