= Neil Fletcher (rugby union) =

English rugby union player

- Born: Neil Robert Fletcher; 4 June 1976 (age 50) Walsall, England
- Height: 6 ft 6 in (1.98 m)
- Weight: 224 lb (16 st 0 lb; 102 kg)
- School: Hydesville Tower School

Rugby union career
- Position: Lock
Senior career
Years	Team	Apps	(Points)
1996–1999	Leicester Tigers	42	(5)
1999–2001	Sale Sharks	11	(0)
2001–2004	Birmingham & Solihull	57	(15)
1996–2004	Total	110	(20)

Neil Robert Fletcher (born 4 June 1976) is a former rugby union lock who played 42 games for Leicester Tigers from 1996 to 1999, and 11 games for Sale Sharks. He was an unused replacement in the 1997 Heineken Cup Final.

== Leicester ==
Fletcher made his Leicester debut on 5 October 1996 in a Courage League match against West Hartlepool, and featured in 20 of 24 matchday squads towards the end of that season including the 1997 Heineken Cup Final. He struggled for game time in 1997-98 featuring only 4 times, but was regularly used during the 1998-99 Premiership Rugby season where he featured 17 times as Leicester won the title. On Saturday 25 September 1999 he was sent off in a Premiership game at Welford Road against Sale. He made his final appearance for Leicester the next week in a match against Gloucester.

== Sale ==
After the end of the 1999 Rugby World Cup Fletcher fell down the pecking order at Leicester and moved to Sale initially on loan. He made his debut for Sale against Bedford on 26 December. On 25 July 2000 he made the move to Sale permanent. He left Sale after the 2000-01 season.

== Birmingham & Solihull ==
Fletcher joined second division club Birmingham & Solihull for the 2001-02 season and made headlines by "exposing himself" in an official team picture used on the front cover of the club's official match programme.

== Sources ==
- Farmer, Stuart; Hands, David (2014). Tigers-Official History of Leicester Football Club. The Rugby Development Foundation. ISBN 978-0-9930213-0-5.)
