= Richard Arnold (rugby union) =

- Full name: Richard Karl Arnold
- Born: 16 August 1968 (age 58) Eltham, New Zealand
- Height: 6 ft 4 in (193 cm)
- Weight: 238 lb (108 kg)

Rugby union career
- Position: Loose forward
Senior career
Years	Team	Apps	(Points)
1991–03	Newcastle Falcons		
Provincial / State sides
Years	Team	Apps	(Points)
1988–91	Taranaki	23	(8)
International career
Years	Team	Apps	(Points)
1999	Wales "A"		

Richard Karl Arnold (born 16 August 1968) is a New Zealand former professional rugby union player.

== Biography ==
Arnold hails from the town of Eltham, known for its dairy industry. He worked in an abattoir while playing rugby for Taranaki from 1988 to 1991. His representative honours were limited to New Zealand Under-21s trials.

A loose forward, Arnold relocated to England in 1991 to take up an opportunity with Newcastle Gosforth (later Falcons), having responded to an advertisement he read in a rugby publication. The then amateur club were competing in Division Two rugby and he ascended to the captaincy in the 1994/95 season. He was with the club for their transition to professional rugby in 1996–97 and played in their 2000–2001 Tetley's Bitter Cup final win over Harlequins. After a testimonial year in 2000–2001, Arnold continued playing until 2003, then got involved in coaching.

Arnold was capped for Wales "A" in 1999, scoring a try in a win over France "A" in Périgueux, before gaining a place on the 1999 tour of Argentina with the Wales national team. His Welsh eligibility had only become known the previous year when he went home to attend a funeral and discovered he had a Welsh grandfather.
