= Thierry Labrousse =

France international rugby union player (born 1970)

- Born: 4 May 1970 (age 56) Périgueux, France
- Height: 6 ft 4 in (193 cm)
- Weight: 238 lb (108 kg)

Rugby union career
- Position: Back-row
International career
Years	Team	Apps	(Points)
1996	France	2	(10)

Thierry Labrousse (born 4 May 1970) is a French former professional rugby union player.

Born in Périgueux, Labrousse was a back-row forward, most often used as a number eight. He captained CA Périgueux to the French Group B championship title in 1993, before linking up with CA Brive, from where he was capped twice for France in 1996. On his international debut, a win over Romania at Aurillac, he crossed over for two tries. His other cap came against the touring Springboks. He played in CA Brive's 1997 Heineken Cup final win over the Leicester Tigers.

Labrousse coached CA Périgueux from 2005 to 2010, then again in 2014.

== See also ==
- List of France national rugby union players
