= Neil Boobyer =

Wales international rugby union player

- Born: Neil Boobyer; 11 June 1972 Bridgend, Wales
- Height: 5 ft 11 in (1.80 m)
- Weight: 13 st 10 lb (87 kg)

Rugby union career
- Position: Centre
Amateur team(s)
| Years | Team | Apps | (Points) |
- Llanelli RFC
International career
| Years | Team | Apps | (Points) |
| 1993–1999 | Wales | 7 | (0) |

Neil Boobyer (born 11 June 1972) is a former Wales international rugby union player. A centre, he played his club rugby for Llanelli and was part of the Wales squad for the 1999 Rugby World Cup.

He made his debut for Wales 22 May 1993 versus Zimbabwe.
