= Will Greenwood =

British Lions & England international rugby union player

Will Greenwood MBE
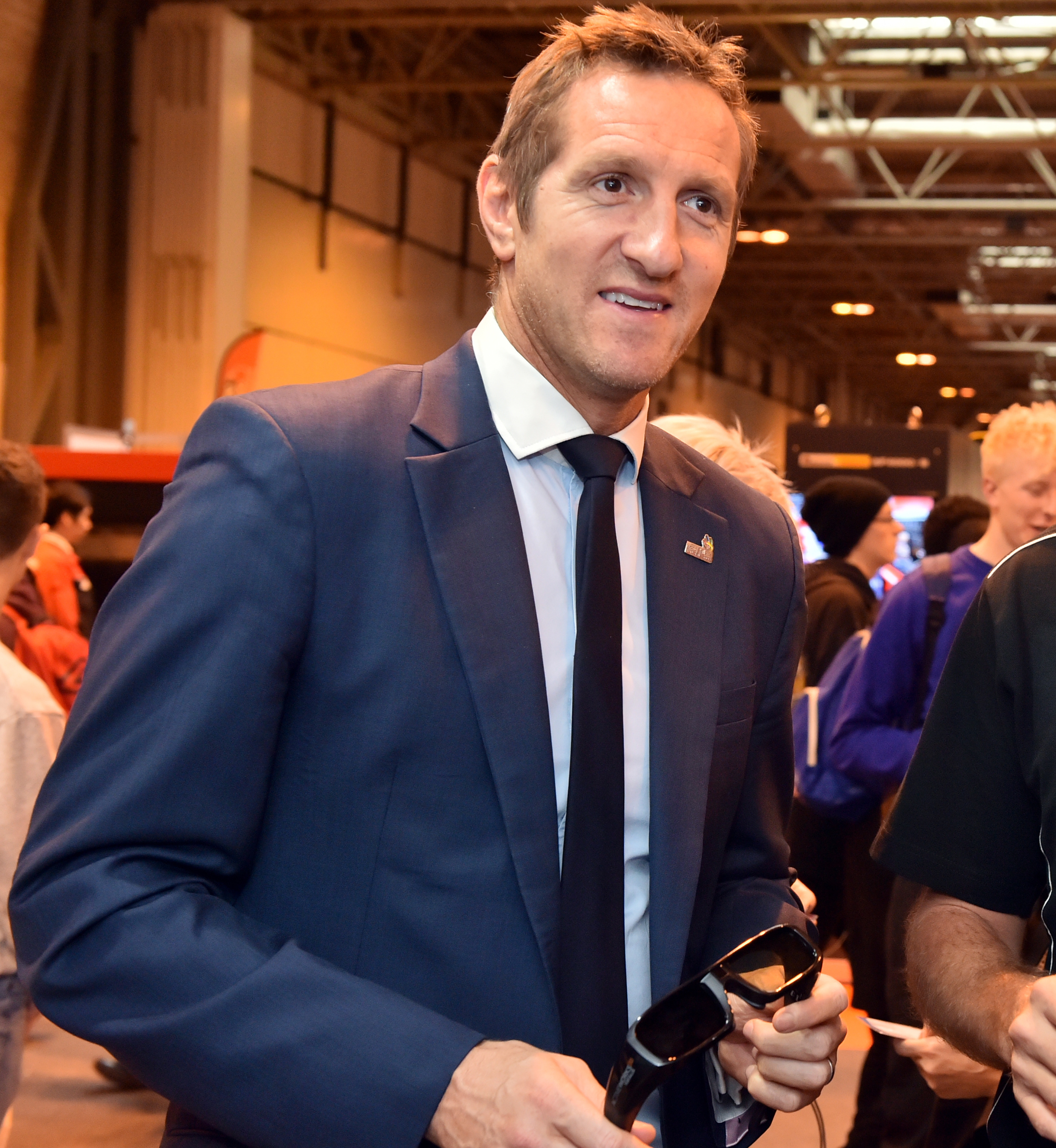
- Born: William John Heaton Greenwood; 20 October 1972 (age 54) Blackburn, Lancashire, England
- Height: 6 ft 4 in (1.93 m)
- Weight: 15 st 10 lb (100 kg)
- School: Sedbergh School
- University: Durham University
- Notable relative: Dick Greenwood (father)

Rugby union career
- Position: Centre
Amateur team(s)
Years	Team	Apps	(Points)
1988–1990	Preston Grasshoppers		
1990–1994	Waterloo R.F.C.		
- Correct as of 1988–1990; 1990–1994
Senior career
Years	Team	Apps	(Points)
1994–1996	Harlequins	25	(70)
1996–2000	Leicester Tigers	151	(307)
2000–2006	Harlequins	82	(135)
- Correct as of 14 September 2006
International career
Years	Team	Apps	(Points)
1997–2004	England	55	(155)
1997, 2001, 2005	British & Irish Lions	2	(0)
- Correct as of 14 September 2006

William John Heaton Greenwood, MBE (born 20 October 1972) is an English former rugby union player who played for Leicester Tigers and Harlequins and was a member of England's 2003 World Cup-winning team and the 1997 British & Irish Lions. He played in the centre, mainly as an inside centre.

He is the son of Dick Greenwood, who was a former England coach.

== Early life ==
Born 20 October 1972 in Blackburn, Lancashire, Greenwood was educated at St Mary's Hall and Sedbergh School. As a schoolboy, he was also a talented cricketer and played for the Lancashire Schools representative team before ultimately deciding to concentrate on rugby. He graduated with a BA in economics from Durham University in 1994. He then worked as a trader at a bank in London.

== Career ==
=== Club ===
Greenwood played club rugby for Preston Grasshoppers, Waterloo, Harlequins and Leicester Tigers.

He left Harlequins and moved to Leicester Tigers in 1996 because the presence of England centre Will Carling meant he could not get first team rugby.

In 2000 he moved back to Harlequins after succumbing to poor form, not helped by the arrival of Australian Pat Howard that prevented him from getting first team rugby. His match-winning try to defeat Brive, in the European Shield quarterfinal on 27 January 2001, was voted the club's 2000/01 'Try of the Year'. He had already picked up an RFU Cup winner's medal with Leicester but tasted defeat in the final of the same competition with NEC Harlequins, at the hands of Newcastle Falcons in 2001.

Greenwood extended his contract with Harlequins when they were relegated to the National League 1. He retired at the end of the 2005/06 season after helping them regain promotion.

=== International ===
He was selected for the British & Irish Lions' tour to South Africa still uncapped, and ahead of then England captain Phil de Glanville, in the summer of 1997. During the tour, he was injured on the pitch after a collision and stopped breathing for several minutes, and did not play in any of the test matches.

He made his England debut in 1997. He became an important part of the England team, establishing a centre partnership with Jeremy Guscott. He later cemented his place in the England team for the Six Nations and World Cup in 2003. He formed a centre partnership with Mike Tindall or Mike Catt and wore the number 13 even if he played inside centre. He was involved in all but one of England's games in the World Cup. Although he had rushed home due to his wife's difficult pregnancy, he returned to the side, scoring England's only try against South Africa, when he followed up to touch down after a Lewis Moody charge down. His try against Wales in the quarter-final in Brisbane turned the match for England in a tight game. He finished the tournament as joint top try scorer with five.

He was made vice captain under Lawrence Dallaglio for the 2004 Six Nations tournament. He reached the 50 cap landmark against Ireland and played in all of England's Six Nations matches. He won the last of 55 England caps against Australia in 2004.

In 2005 Greenwood was injured for the Six Nations, but was selected for the British & Irish Lions tour to New Zealand, his third Lions tour. He replaced Brian O'Driscoll just two minutes into the first test against New Zealand and also played in the third test.

After 55 England caps and 31 tries he announced his retirement at the end of the 2005/6 season England never lost an international match in which Greenwood scored.

=== International Tries ===
Try	Opposing team	Location	Venue	Competition	Date	Result	Score
1	Wales	London, England	Twickenham Stadium	1998 Five Nations Championship	21 February 1998	Win	60–26
2	Netherlands	Huddersfield, England	Galpharm Stadium	1999 Rugby World Cup – European qualification	14 November 1998	Win	110–0
3	Italy	Huddersfield, England	Galpharm Stadium	1999 Rugby World Cup – European qualification	22 November 1998	Win	23–15
4	Canada	London, England	Twickenham Stadium	1999 Canada rugby union tour of Great Britain	28 August 1999	Win	36–11
5	Canada	London, England	Twickenham Stadium	1999 Canada rugby union tour of Great Britain	28 August 1999	Win	36–11
6	Tonga	London, England	Twickenham Stadium	1999 Rugby World Cup	15 October 1999	Win	101–10
7	Tonga	London, England	Twickenham Stadium	1999 Rugby World Cup	15 October 1999	Win	101–10
8	South Africa	London, England	Twickenham Stadium	2000 end-of-year rugby union internationals	2 December 2000	Win	25–17
9	Wales	Cardiff, Wales	Millennium Stadium	2001 Six Nations Championship	3 February 2001	Win	15–44
10	Wales	Cardiff, Wales	Millennium Stadium	2001 Six Nations Championship	3 February 2001	Win	15–44
11	Wales	Cardiff, Wales	Millennium Stadium	2001 Six Nations Championship	3 February 2001	Win	15–44
12	Italy	London, England	Twickenham Stadium	2001 Six Nations Championship	17 February 2001	Win	80–23
13	Scotland	London, England	Twickenham Stadium	2001 Six Nations Championship	3 March 2001	Win	43–3
14	France	London, England	Twickenham Stadium	2001 Six Nations Championship	7 April 2001	Win	48–19
15	Ireland	London, England	Twickenham Stadium	2002 Six Nations Championship	16 February 2002	Win	45–11
16	Ireland	London, England	Twickenham Stadium	2002 Six Nations Championship	16 February 2002	Win	45–11
17	Wales	London, England	Twickenham Stadium	2002 Six Nations Championship	23 March 2002	Win	50–10
18	Italy	Rome, Italy	Stadio Flaminio	2002 Six Nations Championship	7 April 2002	Win	9–45
19	Italy	Rome, Italy	Stadio Flaminio	2002 Six Nations Championship	7 April 2002	Win	9–45
20	South Africa	London, England	Twickenham Stadium	2002 end-of-year rugby union internationals	23 November 2002	Win	53–3
21	South Africa	London, England	Twickenham Stadium	2002 end-of-year rugby union internationals	23 November 2002	Win	53–3
22	Wales	Cardiff, Wales	Millennium Stadium	2003 Six Nations Championship	22 February 2003	Win	9–26
23	Ireland	Dublin, Ireland	Lansdowne Road	2003 Six Nations Championship	30 March 2003	Win	6–42
24	Ireland	Dublin, Ireland	Lansdowne Road	2003 Six Nations Championship	30 March 2003	Win	6–42
25	Australia	Melbourne, Australia	Docklands Stadium	2003 England rugby union tour of the Southern Hemisphere	21 June 2003	Win	14–25
26	Georgia	Perth, Australia	Subiaco Oval	2003 Rugby World Cup	12 October 2003	Win	84–6
27	Georgia	Perth, Australia	Subiaco Oval	2003 Rugby World Cup	12 October 2003	Win	84–6
28	South Africa	Perth, Australia	Subiaco Oval	2003 Rugby World Cup	18 October 2003	Win	6–25
29	Uruguay	Brisbane, Australia	Suncorp Stadium	2003 Rugby World Cup	2 November 2003	Win	111–13
30	Wales	Brisbane, Australia	Suncorp Stadium	2003 Rugby World Cup	9 November 2003	Win	28–17
31	Canada	London, England	Twickenham Stadium	2004 end-of-year rugby union internationals	13 November 2004	Win	70–0

== Post-retirement ==
Greenwood worked as an analyst for Sky Sports and regularly appears on 'The Rugby Club' and live premiership matches, as well as being (with Scott Quinnell) the co-presenter of the School of Hard Knocks Sky TV series. During the 2007 Rugby World Cup, Greenwood was employed by ITV as an analyst for live matches. He also writes a column on the Daily Telegraph discussing the England rugby team. He is a co-founder of a travel and events business, SuperSkills Experiences

In 2019, he was on the first panel to determine the World Rugby women's-15s player-of-the-year award with Melodie Robinson, Danielle Waterman, Liza Burgess, Lynne Cantwell, Fiona Coghlan, Gaëlle Mignot, Jillion Potter, Stephen Jones, and Karl Te Nana.

Since November 2020, Will has been the Chief Customer Officer at Afiniti's London Office

In 2021, Greenwood and Ben Fennell, former Bartle Bogle Hegarty CEO, released World Class: How to Lead, Learn and Grow like a Champion.

== Personal life ==
Greenwood and his wife, Caroline, have three children. They also had a son Freddie who died 45 minutes after his birth in 2002. Greenwood is a patron of Child Bereavement UK, a charity which supports parents who have lost a child. Greenwood is also a Patron of Borne, a medical research charity looking into the causes of premature birth.

In April 2018, he walked to the North Pole in memory of his son Freddie, who was born at 23 weeks, and helped raise over £750,000 for Borne's research. Greenwood was awarded a Doctor of Civil Law honoris causa by his alma mater Durham University in January 2006. In August 2014, Greenwood was one of 200 public figures who were signatories to a letter to The Guardian opposing Scottish independence in the run-up to September's referendum on that issue.

Away from rugby and cricket, Greenwood has been a supporter of Manchester City F.C. since he was 9 years old.

== See also ==
- List of top English points scorers and try scorers
- List of alumni of Hatfield College, Durham
- List of Durham University people
