= Peter Rogers (rugby union) =

Wales international rugby union player

- Born: Peter John Daniel Rogers; 20 January 1969 (age 57) Maidstone, Kent, England

Rugby union career
- Position: Prop Forward
International career
Years	Team	Apps	(Points)
1999-2000	Wales	18	(0)

Peter John Daniel Rogers (born 20 January 1969 in Maidstone, England) is a former Wales international rugby union player. Rogers attended Llandovery College in Wales before playing rugby in South Africa and he was initially implicated in the 'grannygate' scandal before being exonerated.

A prop, Rogers attained 18 caps for Wales between 1999 and 2000. He played club rugby for Gauteng Falcons (Transvaal), Bridgend RFC, Maesteg RFC, Pirates Johannesburg, London Irish, Roma, Newport RFC, Cardiff RFC.

Rogers came out of retirement for the 2007–08 season, where he played for the semi-professional Welsh side Bridgend Ravens in the Welsh Principality Premiership.
