= Ross Nesdale =

Irish rugby union footballer

- Born: July 30, 1969 New Zealand

Rugby union career
- Position: Hooker
Senior career
| Years | Team | Apps | (Points) |
| 1997-2001 | Newcastle Falcons | 70 | |
International career
| Years | Team | Apps | (Points) |
| 1997-1999 | Ireland | 13 | (0) |

Ross Nesdale (born 30 July 1969 in New Zealand) is a retired Irish rugby union footballer who played as a hooker.

== Career ==
Nesdale won 13 caps for Ireland between 1997 and 1999, and was part of the squad at the 1999 Rugby World Cup where he played in two matches. He made his Ireland debut on 1 February 1997 against Wales in Cardiff, and played his last match against Romania on 15 October 1999. He played in seventy games for the Newcastle Falcons between 1997 and 2001 and made 21 appearances for them as they won the 1997-98 Premiership. He also started the victorious 2001 Anglo-Welsh Cup final. He retired in 2001.

== Honours ==
=== Newcastle Falcons ===
- Premiership - 1997–98
- Anglo-Welsh Cup - 2001
