= Brett Sinkinson =

Wales international rugby union player

- Born: Brett David Sinkinson; 30 December 1971 (age 54) Rotorua, New Zealand
- Height: 180 cm (5 ft 11 in)
- Weight: 104 kg (16 st 5 lb)
- School: Whakatane High School

Rugby union career
- Position: Flanker
Amateur team(s)
Years	Team	Apps	(Points)
- Neath RFC
International career
Years	Team	Apps	(Points)
1999–2002	Wales	20	(5)

Brett David Sinkinson (born 30 December 1971) is a New Zealand born rugby union player who played for the Wales national rugby union team. A flanker, he was known for his mobility and hard tackling. He never played for New Zealand.

After representing Wales it was discovered that he was ineligible to play for Wales when he revealed his grandfather Sydney Sinkinson was born in Oldham in England instead of Carmarthen in Wales as had previously been indicated by him. The scandal that followed was termed "grannygate". Sinkinson was barred from playing for Wales but later returned to the Wales team after legally qualifying through the residency rules.

Sinkinson now resides in Tauranga with his wife Tracey and his two children, and works as a landscape gardener.
