= List of people from Newport =

See also Category:People from Newport, Wales

This entry lists notable people who were born, lived or worked in Newport (Newportonians).

== Arts, literature and media ==
- Keith Baxter (actor)
- Alison Bielski (poet)
- Rev Augustus Buckland (writer)
- James Coombes (actor)
- Jack Crabtree (contemporary British artist)
- Charles Danby (actor)
- Josie d'Arby (actress and television presenter)
- Gareth David-Lloyd (actor)
- W. H. Davies (poet, tramp)
- Dirty Sanchez (actors based in Newport)
- Lisa Diveney (actress)
- Aimee-Ffion Edwards (actress)
- Adrian Finighan (newsreader reporter and journalist)
- Valerie Gearon (actress)
- Raymond Glendenning (BBC sports commentator)
- Denys Graham (actor)
- Peter Greenaway (film director)
- Harry Greene (trained as an engineering draughtsman at Newport College of Art)
- Fred Hando (writer, artist and schoolteacher)
- Lyn Harding (actor)
- Anne Hegerty (TV celebrity, South Wales Argus journalist 1980s)
- Frederick William Horner (playwright, publisher and politician)
- Colin Jeavons (actor)
- Charles William King (writer)
- Mark Labbett (professional quizzer and TV personality; lived in Newport 2003)
- David Langford (author)
- Roger Lewis (academic)
- Desmond Llewelyn (actor; James Bond movies)
- Bernard Lloyd (actor; BBC's The Signalman)
- Arthur Machen (author)
- James May (journalist, TV presenter, Top Gear; attended Caerleon Endowed School)
- Johnny Morris (presenter, BBC's Animal Magic)
- Darragh Mortell (actor)
- Matt Rees (novelist)
- Julian Richards (film director)
- Rex Richards (actor, rugby player)
- Alexandria Riley (actor)
- Craig Roberts (actor and director)
- Nathan Rogers (writer)
- Banita Sandhu (actress)
- Keiron Self (actor)
- Caroline Sheen (actress)
- Michael Sheen (actor)
- Tayce (drag artist)
- Leslie Thomas (author)
- Paul Whitsun-Jones (actor)
- Stanley L. Wood (illustrator, artist)

== Music ==
- 60 Ft. Dolls (1990s rock trio)
- The Darling Buds (indie band)
- Desecration (death metal band)
- Dub War (rock band)
- Nick Evans (trombonist notable in the Canterbury scene)
- Green Gartside (songwriter and musician with Scritti Politti, attended Newport Art College)
- Goldie Lookin Chain (satirical rap group)
- Holly Holyoake (soprano)
- Gerard Johnson (keyboard player with Saint Etienne)
- Mai Jones (songwriter, entertainer and radio producer)
- Jon Langford (musician)
- Jon Lee (drummer with Feeder)
- Lemfreck (hip hop and rap artist)
- Jon Lilygreen (Eurovision 2010 contestant and singer with pop duo Lilygreen & Maguire)
- Maggot (rapper with Goldie Lookin Chain)
- Donna Matthews (lead guitarist with Elastica)
- Grant Nicholas (lead singer with Feeder)
- Jack Perrett (singer, songwriter, and musician)
- Skindred (reggae metal band)
- Joe Strummer (guitarist with The Clash, lived in Newport for a year 1973–1974)
- Joe Talbot (lead singer, Idles)
- Terris (indie band)
- John Rogers Thomas (singer, pianist and composer 1829–1896)

== Politics ==
- Kenneth Baker, Baron Baker of Dorking (MP and life peer)
- John Batchelor (anti-slavery campaigner)
- Matt Bishop (MP)
- William Brace (former Liberal and Labour MP for South Glamorganshire and later Abertillery)
- Jayne Bryant (MS)
- Dame Rosemary Butler
- Sarah Cooper-Lesadd, Member of the Senedd for Pen-y-bont Bro Morgannwg
- David TC Davies (MP)
- Joseph Davies
- Chris Elmore
- Thomas Firbank (high sheriff of Monmouthshire and MP for Kingston upon Hull East)
- Paul Flynn
- John Frost (Chartist and mayor of Newport)
- Lionel Gibbs (Canadian politician)
- John Griffiths (MS)
- William Herbert (MP)
- Roy Hughes (Baron Islwyn of Casnewydd)
- Ruth Jones (MP)
- Courtenay Morgan, 1st Viscount Tredegar (Lord Lieutenant of Monmouthshire)
- Godfrey Morgan, 1st Viscount Tredegar (MP, landowner and philanthropist)
- Giles Morgan (soldier and MP)
- Octavius Morgan (MP for Monmouthshire (1841–1874))
- William Morgan (MP)
- Dame Janet Paraskeva (senior government official)
- Thomas Phillips (mayor of Newport during the Chartist Uprising)
- William Pritchard-Morgan (the 'Welsh Gold King' and Liberal MP for Merthyr Tydfil (1888–1900))
- Thomas Prothero (local politician and landowner, opponent of John Frost)
- John Savage (premier of Nova Scotia)
- Frank Soskice, Baron Stow Hill
- James Henry Thomas (trade unionist)
- Florence Tunks (suffragette)
- Sir Charles Hanbury Williams (diplomat and satirist)
- Amelia Womack (deputy leader of the Green Party)

== Sport ==
=== Football ===
- Mark Aizlewood
- Steve Aizlewood
- Byron Anthony
- Cliff Birch
- Nathan Blake
- Stan Bowsher
- Ryan Broom
- Roy Clarke
- Graham Coldrick
- Aaron Collins
- James Collins
- Lewis Collins
- Ellie Curson
- Albert Derrick
- Ollie Dewsbury
- Christian Doidge
- Redvern Edmunds
- Jack Edwards
- Lee Evans
- Owen Evans
- Michael Flynn
- Roger Freestone
- Riccardo Gabbiadini
- Albert Groves
- Chris Gunter
- Ellis Harrison
- Ryan Hillier
- Dom Jefferies
- Harold Jenkins
- Darren Jones
- Lee Kendall
- Jack Lewis
- Sonny Lewis
- Steve Lowndes
- Billy Lucas
- Peter Nicholas
- Tanatswa Nyakuhwa
- Howard Passadoro
- Chris Pearce
- Charlie Phillips
- Keith Pring
- Arthur Pritchard
- Tony Pulis
- Graham Rathbone
- John Relish
- James Rowberry
- Billy Shergold
- Martyn Sprague
- Derrick Sullivan
- Omar Taylor-Clarke
- Jeff Thomas
- Barrie Vassallo
- Erin Vaughan
- Nigel Vaughan
- Bill Waite
- Arthur Weare
- Len Weare
- Andy White
- Rhys Wilmot
- James Wilson
- Finlay Wood
- Albert Young
- George Young

=== Rugby ===
- George Andrews
- Len Attewell
- Mel Baker
- Stuart Barnes
- Taine Basham
- Fred Birt
- George Boots
- Leon Brown
- Mark Brown
- Nathan Budgett
- David Burcher
- Joe Burke
- Eddie Butler
- Glyn Davidge
- Harold Davies
- Harry Day
- Elliot Dee
- Rio Dyer
- Gareth Evans
- John Evans
- Charlie Faulkner
- Trevor Foster
- Billy Geen
- Arthur 'Monkey' Gould
- Bert Gould
- Bob Gould
- Dalton Grant
- Cerys Hale
- Keith Jarrett
- Ceri Jones
- Ryan Jones
- Thomas Baker Jones
- Llewellyn Lloyd
- Horace Lyne
- Ossie Male
- Gus Merry
- Tyler Morgan
- Jack Morley
- Steve Morris
- Richard Mullock
- Lyndon Mustoe
- Charlie Newman
- Harry Peacock
- Lou Phillips
- Reg Plummer
- Alix Popham
- Charlie Pritchard
- Rex Richards
- Jamie Roberts
- Jerry Shea
- Reg Skrimshire
- Jeff Squire
- George Thomas
- Malcolm Thomas
- Bunner Travers
- George Travers
- Tommy Vile
- Aaron Wainwright
- Alex Walker
- Nick Walne
- Matthew J. Watkins
- Stuart Watkins
- Jack Wetter
- Jack Whitfield
- Stanley Williams
- Bobby Windsor
- Chris Wyatt

=== Other sports ===
- Johnny Basham (boxer)
- Mark Bennett (snooker player)
- Darren Campbell (athlete; Olympic gold medal-winning sprinter)
- Dan Cherry (cricketer)
- Paul Collier (snooker referee)
- Matthew Compton (cricketer)
- Abbas Farid (freestyle footballer)
- Adam Harrison (cricketer)
- Venissa Head (athlete; shot putter and discus thrower)
- Robert Henderson (cricketer)
- Len Hill (footballer and cricketer)
- Gary Hocking (motorcycle racer)
- Christian Malcolm (athlete; Olympic sprinter)
- Sean McGoldrick (bantamweight boxer)
- Darren Morgan (snooker player)
- Jon Mould (racing cyclist)
- Andrew Pagett (snooker player)
- David 'Bomber' Pearce (heavyweight boxer)
- Reginald Phillips (cricketer)
- Ian Preece (snooker player)
- Phillip Price (golfer)
- Alan Rees (Grand Prix motor racing driver)
- Dick Richardson (heavyweight boxer)
- Tony Ridler (darts player)
- Sallyanne Short (athlete)

== Other notable people ==
- Sir John Beynon, 1st Baronet (businessman and military commander)
- Perce Blackborow (Antarctic explorer)
- Cadoc (saint)
- Lee Dainton (star of MTV's Dirty Sanchez)
- Graham Dixon-Lewis (combustion engineer)
- Lewis Evans (mathematician)
- Joseph Firbank (English railway contractor Monmouthshire Railway and Canal Company)
- Gwladys (queen: wife of King Gwynllyw)
- Gwynllyw (saint)
- Mary Jane Innes (brewery manager)
- Edward Lewis (minister)
- John Wallace Linton (Royal Navy commander and Victoria Cross recipient)
- John Llewelyn (philosopher)
- Sir Terry Matthews (entrepreneur; Wales' first billionaire)
- Samuel Baldwyn Rogers (inventor, chemist & radical pamphleteer)
- Fulton J. Sheen (archbishop of the titular see of Newport)
- Raymond Steed (seaman)
- Matt Tebbutt (chef and TV food presenter)
- Ruth van Heyningen (biochemist)
- John Williams (company sergeant major, South Wales Borderers), Victoria Cross recipient; died in Newport 1953)
