= Len Trump =

Wales international rugby union & league footballer

- Born: Leonard Charles Trump; 23 April 1887 Newport, Wales
- Died: 9 June 1948 (aged 61) Newport, Wales
- Notable relative: George Travers (brother-in-law)

Rugby union career
- Position: prop
Amateur team(s)
Years	Team	Apps	(Points)
–	Pill Harriers RFC		
–	Newport RFC		
1902–1921	Monmouthshire		
International career
Years	Team	Apps	(Points)
1912	Wales	4	(0)
- Rugby league career

Playing information
- Position: Forwards
Club
Years	Team	Pld	T	G	FG	P
1912	Hull Kingston Rovers	103				30

Leonard Charles Trump (23 April 1887 – 9 June 1948) was a Welsh international rugby union player, who later switched to professional rugby league. He played amateur club rugby predominantly for Newport, and played county rugby for Monmouthshire, and as a professional joined Hull Kingston Rovers.

== Personal history ==
Born in Newport, Wales in 1887, Trump was part of an impressive sporting family. His brother-in-law was fellow Welsh international George Travers, whose son Bunner Travers also represented Wales. Trump served with the Royal Artillery during World War I. He worked for a potato merchant.

== Rugby union career ==
Trump first came to note as a rugby player when he represented Pill Harriers RFC, a hard Monmouthshire docklands team who were a strong feeder club for Newport. Trump followed many past player, when he left the Harriers for Newport, becoming a regular forward member. During the 1911/12 season, he is recorded as being 'often outstanding' for the club. Trump made his début for Wales on 20 January 1912 against England as part of the Five Nations Championship. Trump would play in all four matches of the tournament, which saw home victories over Scotland and France, but loses away to England and Ireland.

=== International games played ===
Wales

- England 1912
- Ireland 1912
- France 1912,
- Scotland 1912

== Bibliography ==
- Parry-Jones, David (1999). Prince Gwyn, Gwyn Nicholls and the First Golden Era of Welsh Rugby. Bridgend: seren. ISBN 1-85411-262-7.
- Smith, David; Williams, Gareth (1980). Fields of Praise: The Official History of The Welsh Rugby Union. Cardiff: University of Wales Press. ISBN 0-7083-0766-3.
