= Peter Davies (rugby) =

Welsh rugby footballer

Personal information
- Full name: Peter J. Davies
- Born: 30 December 1925 Newport, Wales
- Died: 18 February 2014 (aged 88) Newport, Wales

Playing information
- Weight: 14 st 0 lb (89 kg)

Rugby union
- Position: Back-row
Club
Years	Team	Pld	T	G	FG	P
	Ebbw Bridge Junction RFC
19??–53	Newport RFC
	Total	0	0	0	0	0

Rugby league
Club
Years	Team	Pld	T	G	FG	P
1953–56	Leigh	48	5	23	0	61
- As of 12 January 2015

Peter J. Davies (30 December 1925 – 18 February 2014) was a Welsh rugby union, and professional rugby league footballer who played in the 1940s and 1950s, and rugby union administrator. (Note: Not to be confused with the rugby league footballer who played in the 1960s for Balmain Tigers; the rugby league footballer (winger) of the 1980s for South Sydney Rabbitohs, Balmain Tigers, Canterbury-Bankstown Bulldogs; the rugby union (second row) and rugby league footballer who played in the 1950s and 1960s for Neath RFC) He played club level rugby union (RU) for Ebbw Bridge Junction RFC and Newport RFC (vice-captain to Roy Burnett), in the back row, e.g. flanker, or number eight, and club level rugby league (RL) for Leigh, as a goal-kicking player, he was later chairman, and then president, of Pill Harriers RFC.

== Background ==
Peter Davies' birth was registered in Newport, Wales, Wales, he worked as a docker, he and his wife Gwen were the landlords of the Brown Cow public house in Warrington, and later The Railway Hotel public house in Leigh, and he died aged 88 in Newport, Wales, his funeral took place at St Stephen's Church, Pillgwenlly at 11:00am on Monday 10 March 2014.

== Club career ==
Peter J. Davies played his last match for Newport RFC against Newbridge RFC on Saturday 25 April 1953, he made his debut for Leigh during October 1953.
