= Len Attewell =

- Born: Stephen Leonard Attewell; 31 December 1895 Nash, Newport, Wales
- Died: 26 February 1983 (aged 87) Newport, Wales
- Occupation: farmer

Rugby union career
- Position: Prop
Amateur team(s)
Years	Team	Apps	(Points)
- Pill Harriers RFC
1914-1921	Newport RFC		
International career
Years	Team	Apps	(Points)
1921	Wales	3	(0)

Len Attewell (31 December 1895 – 26 February 1983) was a Welsh international rugby union prop who played club rugby for Newport.

== Rugby career ==
Attewell began his rugby career with Newport Docks team Pill Harriers, but moved to Newport in 1914. A tough front row player, Attewell played at prop and hooker positions. In 1921 he was selected for the Welsh team against England on 15 January 1921. The Welsh team held several Newport players, including captain, Jack Wetter and centre Jerry Shea, but lost the match 18-3. He played three games for Wales, all in the 1921 Five Nations Championship

=== International matches played ===
Wales

- England 1921
- France 1921
- Scotland 1921

== Bibliography ==
- Smith, David; Williams, Gareth (1980). Fields of Praise: The Official History of The Welsh Rugby Union. Cardiff: University of Wales Press. ISBN 0-7083-0766-3.
