= Newport High School (Wales) =

Secondary school in Newport, South Wales

- Ysgol Uwchradd Casnewydd

Location
- Bettws Lane; Newport, NP20 7YB; United Kingdom
- Coordinates: 51°36′25″N 3°00′54″W

Information
- Type: Comprehensive
- Motto: Learning, Believing, Achieving
- Established: November 2009 (new school)
- Local authority: Newport City Council
- Chair of Governors: Jon Jenkins
- Headteacher: Gill Lee
- Staff: 80+ teachers, 30+ support staff
- Gender: Coeducational
- Age: 11 to 18
- Enrolment: 1,200
- Houses: Branwen Pryderi Taliesin Olwen
- Website: http://www.newporthigh.co.uk

Newport High School (Welsh: Ysgol Uwchradd Casnewydd) is a co-educational secondary school in the Bettws district of the city of Newport, South Wales, UK for pupils aged 11–18 years.

== Admissions ==
There are about 1,100 pupils from a catchment area to the north western side of Newport.

== History ==
The school's origin can be dated back to the foundation in 1896 of separate Boys' and Girls' intermediate schools in Newport. Subsequently the High School name was adopted. Following the implementation of comprehensive education the school(s) eventually moved from Queen's Hill to Bettws Lane. The current school of 2009 was built in front of the old Bettws Comprehensive School, itself built in 1970. The latter's school plot was sold to Barratt Homes for demolition and house building.

On 7 January 2025, the school went into lockdown after a former pupil entered the school and attacked three teachers, causing one of them to be hospitalised.

- Newport High School 1964 - The Return of an Old Boy, 1964 8mm cine film at YouTube

== Academic performance ==
The school's most recent Estyn inspection took place in 2008. This report was in quick succession to an inspection during November 2007. The 2007 report noted the school's improvements, particularly in GCSE results, since the previous inspection in 2001, but recommended that significant further improvement was necessary. The 2008 report concluded that "significant improvement" had been made and the school was placed back into the standard inspection cycle.

== Alumni ==
=== Newport High School for Boys ===
- Keith Baxter (actor)
- Cyril Bence, Labour MP from 1951 to 1970 for East Dunbartonshire
- Richard Bradshaw, Director General from 1977 to 1981 of the Army Medical Services, and Commandant from 1973 to 1975 of the RAMC Training Centre
- Trevor Brewer, rugby player
- David Burcher, rugby player
- Graham Dixon-Lewis, professor of combustion science from 1978 to 1987 at the University of Leeds
- Gareth L Evans rugby union player
- John Evans (rugby union, born 1911)
- Raymond Glendenning, sports commentator
- Peter Gray, professor of physical chemistry from 1962 to 1988 at the University of Leeds, master from 1988 to 1996 of Gonville and Caius College, Cambridge, and president from 1983 to 1985 of the Faraday Society
- Donald Harrison, professor of laryngology and otology from 1963 to 1990 at UCL Medical School, and expert on laryngeal cancer
- Walter Martin (rugby union)
- Robert Rowthorn, professor of economics from 1991 to 2006 at the University of Cambridge

=== Newport High School for Girls ===
- Margaret Delacourt-Smith, Baroness Delacourt-Smith of Alteryn
- Alison Bielski, poet and writer.
