= Rex Richards =

Rex Richards may refer to:

- Rex Richards (chemist) (1922–2019), British chemist and academic
- Rex Richards (rugby union) (1934–1989), Welsh rugby union player

== See also ==
- Richards (surname)
