= Harry Wetter =

Wales international rugby union player

- Born: William Henry Wetter; 3 February 1882 Southsea, England
- Died: 4 February 1934 (aged 52) Newport, Wales
- Notable relative(s): Jack Wetter, brother
- Occupation: Police officer

Rugby union career
- Position: Prop
Amateur team(s)
Years	Team	Apps	(Points)
- Pill Harriers RFC
1903–1920	Newport RFC		
–	Glamorgan		
–	Monmouthshire		
International career
Years	Team	Apps	(Points)
1912–1913	Wales	2	(0)

Harry Wetter (3 February 1882 – 4 February 1934) was an English-born international, rugby union centre who played club rugby for Newport and county rugby with Glamorgan and Monmouthshire. He won just two caps for Wales but is most notable for being a member of the Newport team that beat the 1912 touring South African team. He was also a member of the Wales bowls and baseball team.

== Rugby career ==
Wetter first played rugby for Pill Harriers the notoriously hard team from Newport Docks. He switched to first-class team Newport in 1903 and in 1906 was chosen for the Newport team to face Paul Roos' touring South African team. Although Newport lost the match, Wetter would win the return match when he faced the second touring South African team, again with Newport, in 1912.

In 1912, Wetter won his first Welsh cap against the touring South Africans, in a game at the Cardiff Arms Park. His only other match for his country was against England in 1913, Wales lost badly and Wetter was one of eight players that were never selected for Wales again.

=== International matches played ===
Wales

- England 1913
- South Africa 1912

== Bibliography ==
- Smith, David; Williams, Gareth (1980). Fields of Praise: The Official History of The Welsh Rugby Union. Cardiff: University of Wales Press. ISBN 0-7083-0766-3.
