= Albert Stock =

- Born: Albert Stock; 21 April 1897 Newport, Monmouthshire
- Died: 4 May 1969 (aged 72) Newport, Monmouthshire

Rugby union career
- Position: Centre
Amateur team(s)
Years	Team	Apps	(Points)
- Pill Harriers RFC
1921-1928	Newport RFC		
International career
Years	Team	Apps	(Points)
1924-1926	Wales	4	(0)

Albert Stock (21 April 1897 – 4 May 1969) was a Welsh international rugby union centre who played club rugby for Newport. While with Newport, Stock faced three international touring teams and scored over a hundred tries for the club.

== Rugby career ==
Born in Newport, Stock was introduced to rugby while serving in Egypt during World War I. After returning to Wales he joined hard, dock team Pill Harriers, before switching to Newport in 1921. In 1924, Stock was selected to play for Wales against France in the Five Nations Championship. Under the captaincy of Rowe Harding, Stock was part of a ramshackle selection, caused by the late suspension of Ossie Male. Wales won, but unconvincingly.

Towards the end of 1924, Stock was part of the Newport team to face the touring New Zealand team. Newport came close to beating the All Blacks, and Stock found himself re-selected for Wales when they played the touring New Zealanders on 29 November. Wales were thoroughly beaten by the All Blacks, and Stone did not play for any of the 1925 Five Nations Championship. In 1926 Stone was back in the Welsh team and faced England and Scotland in the Championship. The game against Scotland, the first Welsh match at Murrayfield, was Stock's last for his country.

Away from internationals, Stock continued to represent Newport playing against two more touring sides. He faced the New South Wales Waratahs in 1926 and the New Zealand Māori rugby union team in 1927.

=== International games played ===
Wales

- England 1926
- France 1924
- New Zealand 1924
- Scotland 1926

== Bibliography ==
- Parry-Jones, David (1999). Prince Gwyn, Gwyn Nicholls and the First Golden Era of Welsh Rugby. Bridgend: seren. ISBN 1-85411-262-7.
- Smith, David; Williams, Gareth (1980). Fields of Praise: The Official History of The Welsh Rugby Union. Cardiff: University of Wales Press. ISBN 0-7083-0766-3.
- Godwin, Terry (1984). The International Rugby Championship 1883-1983. Grafton Street, London: Willow Books. ISBN 0-00-218060-X.
