= Thornhill Cemetery and Cardiff Crematorium =

Cemetery in Cardiff, Wales

- Mynwent Draenen Pen-y-graig ac Amlosgfa Caerdydd
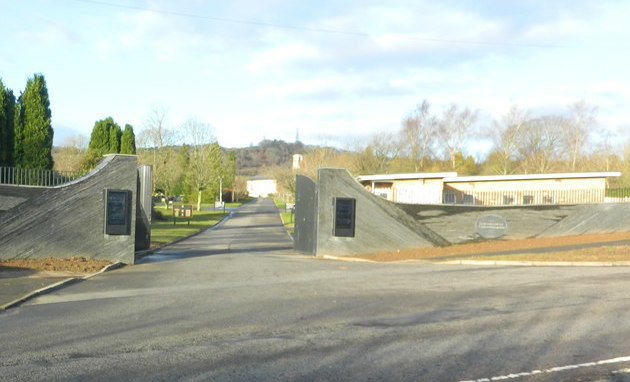
- Entrance to the cemetery and crematorium
- Interactive map of Thornhill Cemetery and Cardiff Crematorium

Details
- Established: August 1952
- Location: Thornhill, Cardiff
- Country: Wales
- Coordinates: 51.536944°N 3.209444°W
- Type: Public
- Owned by: Cardiff Council
- Website: Thornhill Cemetery website
- Find a Grave: Thornhill Cemetery and Cardiff Crematorium

Thornhill Cemetery and Cardiff Crematorium (Welsh: Mynwent Draenen Pen-y-graig ac Amlosgfa Caerdydd) is a major cemetery and crematorium located in Thornhill, a northern suburb of Cardiff, south Wales. It is located on the A469 road (Thornhill Road).

Cardiff Crematorium was opened in 1953 and occupies a 40-acre (16 ha) site as part of the Thornhill Cemetery. The cemetery contains two chapels – Wenallt Chapel and Briwnant Chapel – and the Gardens of Remembrance for the scattering of cremated remains.

The cemetery won the Memorial Awareness Board's "Cemetery of the Year" award in 2016, 2020, 2021 and 2024.

== Notable burials and cremations ==
- Sir Tasker Watkins (Lord Justice of Appeal)
- Rhodri Morgan (First Minister of Wales)
- Alison Bielski (poet and writer)
- Jack Brooks (politician)
- Joe Erskine (Welsh boxer)
- Arwel Hughes (conductor and composer)
- Fred Keenor (footballer)

== Gallery ==
Views of Thornhill Cemetery and Cardiff Crematorium
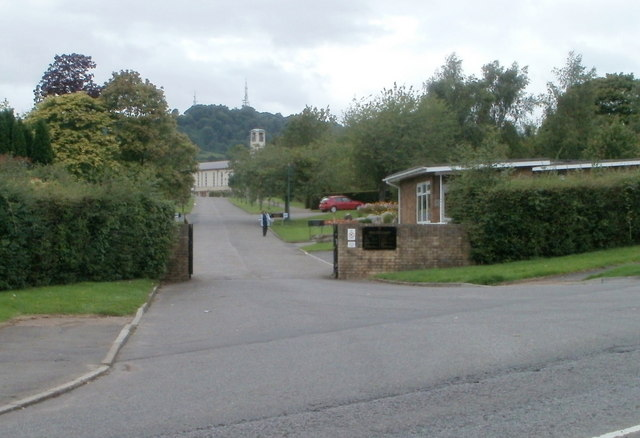
Entrance in 2010

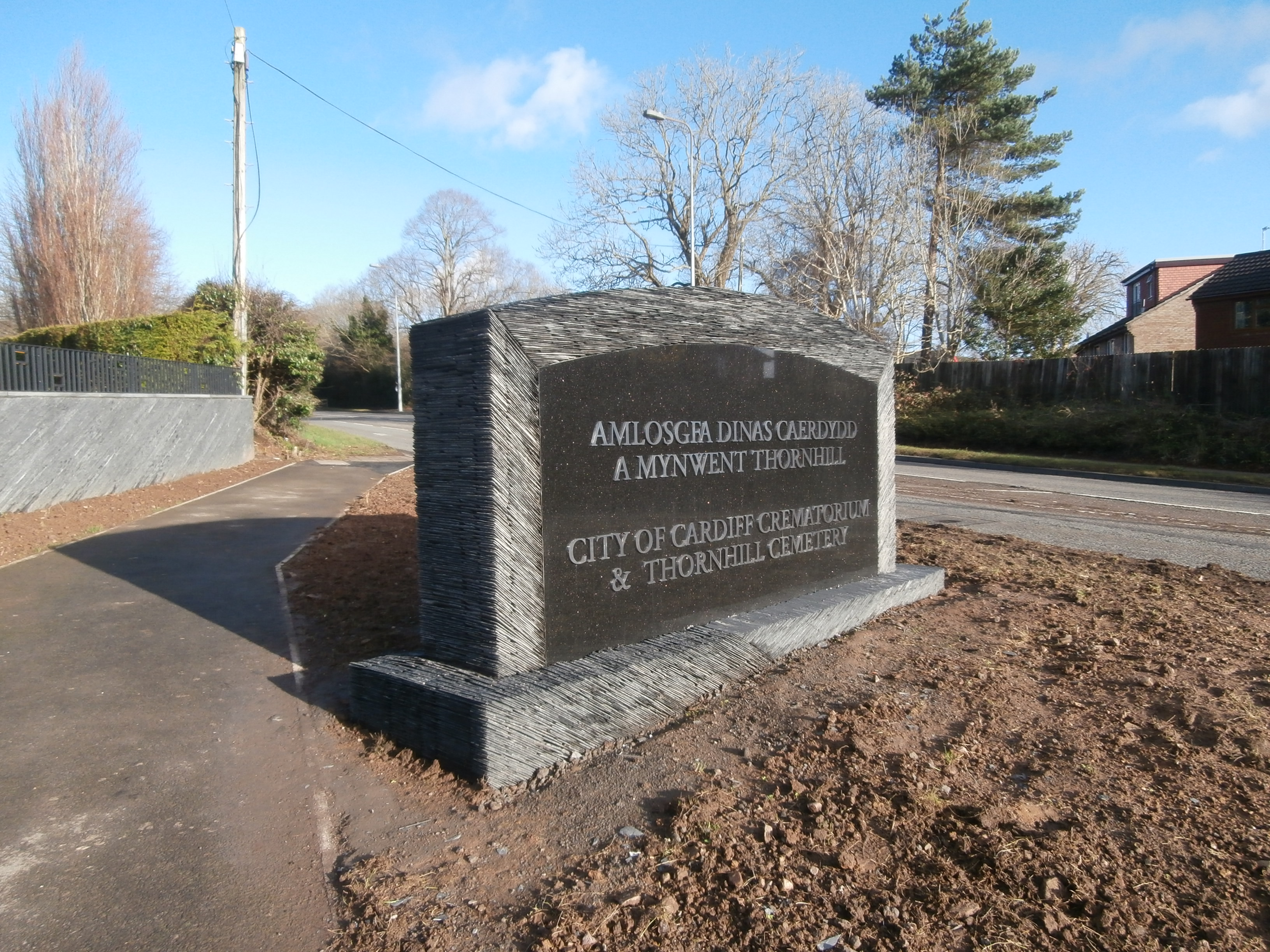
Sign at entrance in 2014

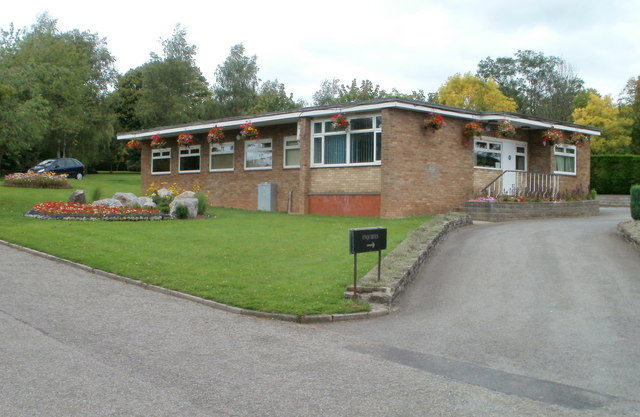
Reception office

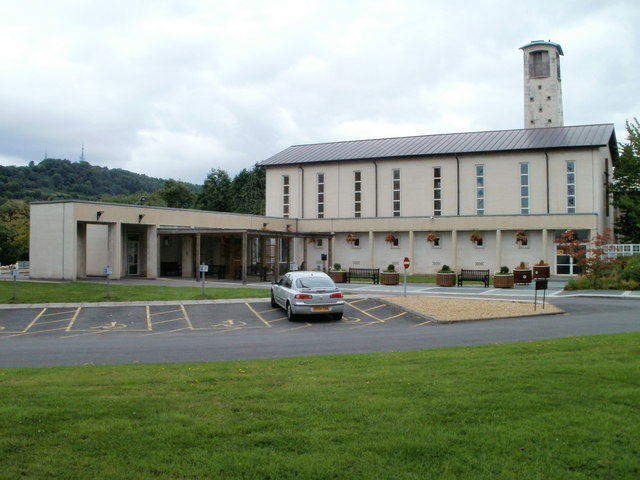
Wenallt Chapel and crematorium
