= Tasker Watkins =

Welsh judge, barrister, soldier, teacher and sports executive

Major The Right Honourable Sir Tasker Watkins VC GBE DL
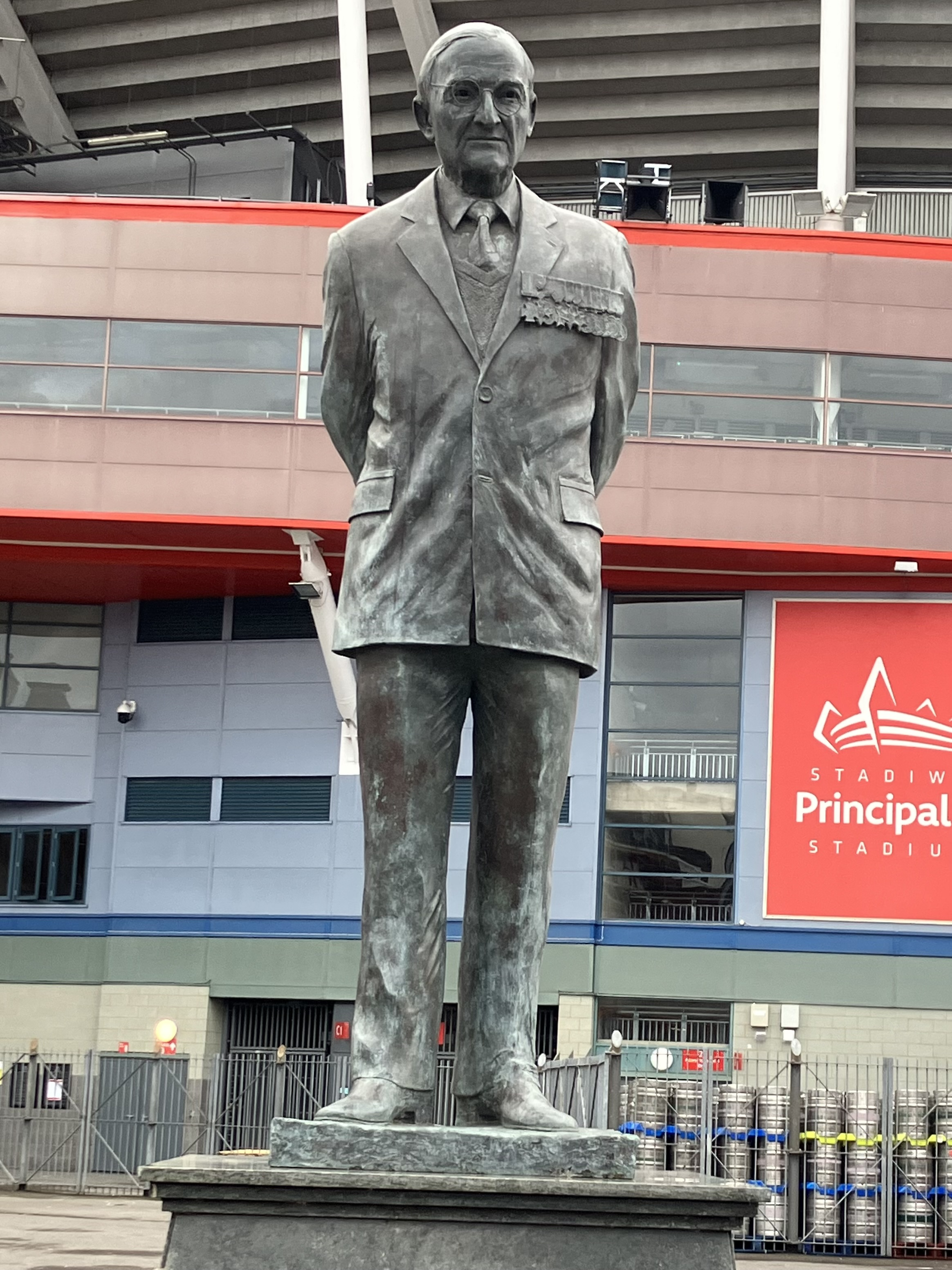
- Statue at the Millennium Stadium, Cardiff

Deputy Chief Justice of England and Wales
- In office 1988–1993
- Succeeded by: The Lord Judge

Lord Justice of Appeal
- In office 1980–1993

President of the Welsh Rugby Union
- In office 1993–2004
- Preceded by: Graham Tregidon
- Succeeded by: Keith Rowlands

Personal details
- Born: 18 November 1918 Nelson, Glamorgan, Wales
- Died: 9 September 2007 (aged 88) Cardiff, Wales
- Resting place: Thornhill Cemetery, Cardiff (cremated)
- Spouse: Eirwen Evans (m. 1941)
- Children: 2
- Civilian awards: GBE; Kt; K.StJ

Military service
- Allegiance: United Kingdom
- Branch/service: British Army
- Years of service: 1939–1944
- Rank: Major
- Unit: Duke of Cornwall's Light Infantry; Welch Regiment
- Battles/wars: World War II
- Military awards: Victoria Cross

Sir Tasker Watkins VC GBE DL (18 November 1918 – 9 September 2007) was a Welsh Lord Justice of Appeal and deputy Lord Chief Justice. He was President of the Welsh Rugby Union from 1993 to 2004. During the Second World War, he served in the British Army and was awarded the Victoria Cross, the highest British award for valour in the face of the enemy. A war hero who was prominent in the law and in Rugby Union, Watkins was described as The Greatest Living Welshman.

== Early life ==
Watkins was born in the small town of Nelson, Glamorgan, the son of Bertram Watkins, an engine fitter, and his wife Jane Watkins, née Phillips. He won a scholarship to Pontypridd Boys' Grammar School. In 1931 he moved with his parents to Dagenham in east London. He attended school in Romford where he captained the cricket and football teams and played rugby. After leaving school he worked for export agents and a halibut oil company and became a teacher in London.

== Second World War ==
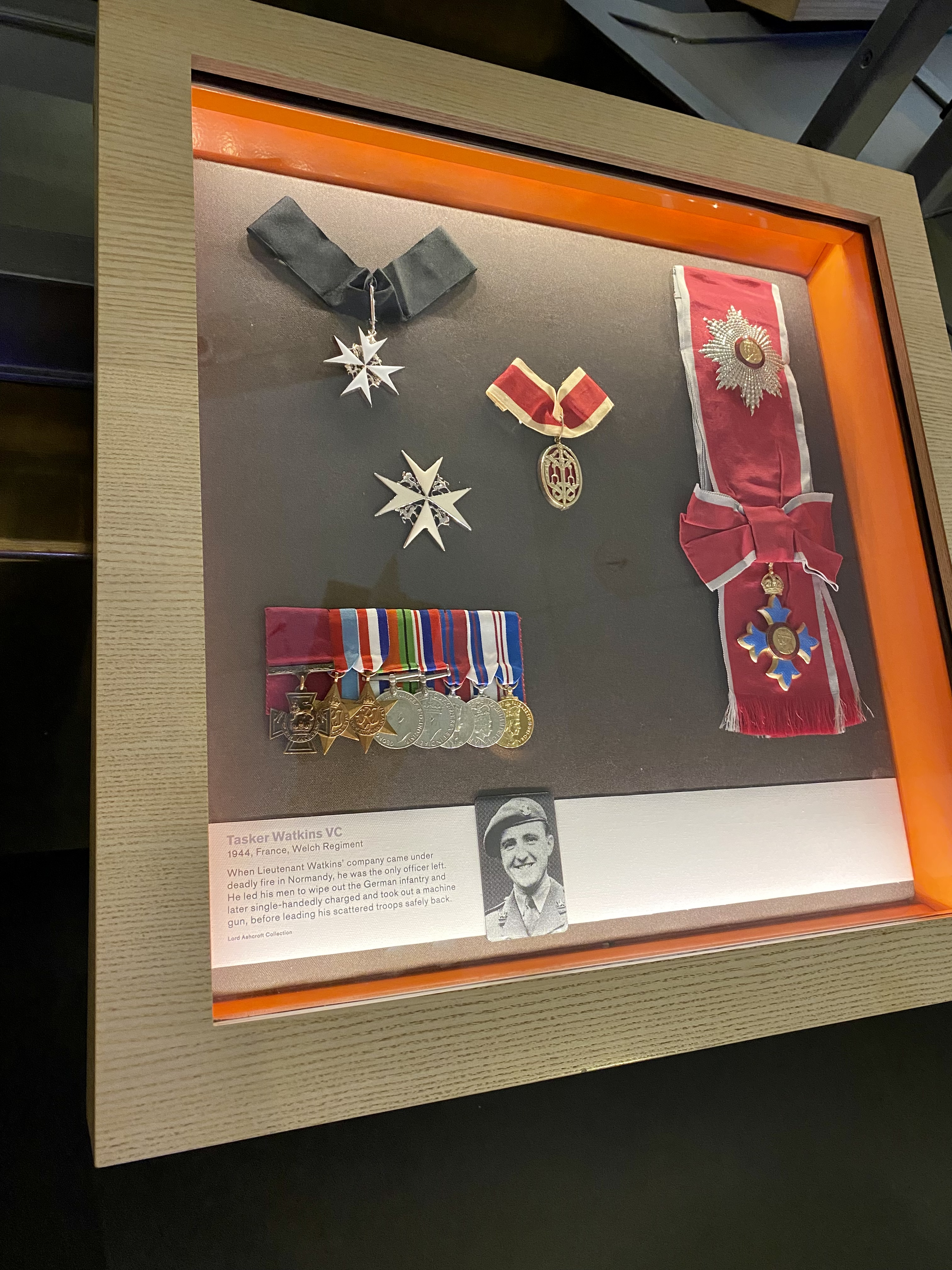
The military decorations of Watkins on display at the Imperial War Museum in London

Following the outbreak of the Second World War in September 1939, Watkins joined the British Army, initially as a private in the Duke of Cornwall's Light Infantry, in October. After serving for over a year as a private he was sent for officer training and was commissioned, with the rank of second lieutenant, into the Welch Regiment on 17 May 1941. He was given the service number 187088. He was posted to the regiment's 1/5th Battalion, a Territorial Army (TA) unit. The battalion was one of three (the others being the 4th Welch Regiment and the 2nd Monmouthshire Regiment) which formed part of the 160th Infantry Brigade, itself being one of three brigades (the others being the 158th and 159th) forming the 53rd (Welsh) Infantry Division. The division, then commanded by Major General Gerard Bucknall, was serving in Northern Ireland until moving to Wales late in 1941, and then to Kent in April 1942, where it remained for over two years before it saw action, until then being engaged in training and military exercises.

As a lieutenant, Watkins departed for France with the rest of the 53rd Division, commanded by Major General Robert Knox Ross, arriving in late June 1944, just weeks after the D-Day landings. The division participated in a number of engagements, such as the Second Battle of the Odon, and, in August, the battle of the Falaise Pocket. It was strategically important to control the gap between Falaise and Argentan, to prevent German reinforcements for the Pas de Calais reaching the main force. By mid-August Watkins, commanding "B" Company in his battalion, which had by now been transferred from the 160th Brigade to the 158th Brigade, was one officer in a group leading an assault on a German machine gun post. As the only uninjured officer, Watkins led a bayonet charge against 50 armed enemy infantry and then single-handedly took out a machine-gun post to ensure the safety of his unit.

He was the first Welsh member of the British Army to be awarded a VC during the Second World War. His citation read:

In North-West Europe on the evening, of 16th August, 1944, Lieutenant Watkins was commanding a company of the Welch Regiment. The battalion was ordered to attack objectives near the railway at Bafour. Lieutenant Watkin's company had to cross open cornfields in which booby traps had been set. It was not yet dusk and the company soon came under heavy machine-gun fire from posts in the com and farther back, and also fire from an 88 mm. gun; many casualties were caused and the advance was slowed up.

Lieutenant Watkins, the only officer left, placed himself at the head of his men and under short range fire charged two posts in succession, personally killing or wounding the occupants with his Sten gun. On reaching his objective he found an anti-tank gun manned by a German soldier; his Sten gun jammed, so he threw it in the German's face and shot him with his pistol before he had time to recover.

Lieutenant Watkin's company now had only some 30 men left and was counter-attacked by 50 enemy infantry. Lieutenant Watkins directed the fire of his men and then led a bayonet charge, which resulted in the almost complete destruction of the enemy. It was now dusk and orders were given for the battalion to withdraw. These orders were not received by Lieutenant Watkin's company as the wireless set had been destroyed. They now found themselves alone and surrounded in depleted numbers and in failing light. Lieutenant Watkins decided to rejoin his battalion by passing round the flank of the enemy position through which he had advanced but while passing through the cornfields once more, he was challenged by an enemy post at close range. He ordered his men to scatter and himself charged the post with a Bren gun and silenced it. He then led the remnants of his company back to battalion headquarters.

His superb gallantry and total disregard for his own safety during an extremely difficult period were responsible for saving the lives of his men, and had a decisive influence on the course of the battle.

— Citation in the London Gazette on the award of the Victoria Cross

Watkins' active service ended in October 1944 when he was badly wounded in the battle to liberate the Dutch city of 's‑Hertogenbosch, where a memorial service was held for him in St. John's Cathedral in 2007. He rarely spoke about the war. Of the event which led to him being awarded the VC he simply stated, in a 1955 radio interview:

A good memory is a fine thing but for those who were there it should not be too good. It should be good enough, however, to recall the great comradeship we had and which we shall never experience again.

He stated in another interview with The Daily Telegraph in 2001:

You must believe me when I say it was just another day in the life of a soldier. I did what needed doing to help colleagues and friends, just as others looked out for me during the fighting that summer... I didn't wake up the next day a better or braver person, just different. I'd seen more killing and death in 24 hours−indeed been part of that terrible process−than is right for anybody. From that point onwards I have tried to take a more caring view of my fellow human beings, and that, of course, always includes your opponent, whether it be in war, sport, or just life generally.

Wales rugby coach Graham Henry had Watkins' citation pinned up on the wall of the Welsh changing room before Six Nations encounters.

Watkins' VC is on display in the Lord Ashcroft Gallery in the Imperial War Museum.

== Career ==
Watkins later achieved the rank of major, and on leaving the Army, studied law. He was called to the bar at the Middle Temple in 1948. He became a Queen's Counsel on 27 April 1965, and in 1966–67 was Counsel to the Tribunal on the inquiry into the Aberfan disaster, which happened a few miles from his birthplace.

Watkins was deputy chairman of Radnorshire Quarter Sessions between 1962 and 1971, and of Carmarthenshire Quarter Sessions from 1966 until 1971. He was Recorder of Merthyr Tydfil between 1968 and 1970 and of Swansea during 1970 and 1971. He was Leader of the Wales and Chester Circuit from 1970 to 1971.

In 1971, he was appointed to the High Court bench, where he sat in the Family Division between 1971 and 1974, and thereafter, until 1980, in the Queen's Bench Division. He was a Presiding Judge of the Wales and Chester Circuit from 1975 until he was promoted to the Court of Appeal (receiving the customary appointment to the Privy Council) in 1980. He became the first Senior Presiding Judge in 1983. Lord Lane appointed him Deputy Chief Justice in 1988, a post which he continued to hold under Lane's successor as Lord Chief Justice, Lord Taylor of Gosforth, until retiring from the bench in 1993.

Watkins was a chairman of the Mental Health Review Tribunal, Wales Region, between 1960 and 1971 and was also chairman of the Judicial Studies Board during 1979 and 1980.

=== Welsh Rugby Union ===
Watkins played Rugby Union football as an outside-half for the Army, Cardiff RFC and Glamorgan Wanderers. He became president of the Welsh Rugby Union in 1993, overseeing the switch from the amateur era to professionalism and the move from club to regional rugby in Wales. He stepped down on 26 September 2004 as the first man since Sir David Rocyn Jones in 1953 to hold office for more than one season. His 11 years of service made him the second longest serving president in the WRU's 123-year history.

Watkins was also chairman, President of Glamorgan Wanderers, and patron until his death. Watkins is now honoured by Glamorgan Wanderers as their First XV team shirt has the letters STW-VC (Sir Tasker Watkins VC) in a green box on the right shoulder. The Wanderers also have a working model statue of Watkins in their club house donated by Llantwit Major based sculptor Roger Andrews. It stands in a corner that has been called 'Tasker's Corner' by members of the club. Watkins has been called "The most influential Welshman of the late 20th century."

Watkins was appointed an honorary life vice-patron of the WRU. On announcement of his death, the Welsh team wore black armbands for their 2007 Rugby World Cup game against Canada in Nantes, France, as a tribute to the former WRU president.

=== Other interests ===
Watkins was president of the University of Wales College of Medicine for 11 years from 1987, and was president of the British Legion in Wales from 1947 to 1968.

Watkins was once asked by the Liberal Party if he would consider becoming a Member of Parliament and a safe seat was offered him, but Watkins turned the offer down.

== Later life ==
After falling at his home in Llandaff in August 2007, Watkins was hospitalised at the University Hospital of Wales, Cardiff. Watkins died at the hospital on 9 September 2007. His funeral was held at Llandaff Cathedral on 15 September, and he was later cremated at Thornhill Crematorium.

== Personal life ==
Watkins married Eirwen Evans in 1941. They had a son and a daughter.

== Honours and decorations ==

Ribbon	Description	Notes
	Victoria Cross (VC)	16 August 1944
	Order of the British Empire (GBE)	Knight Grand Cross; Civil Division; 1990 New Years Honours List
	Knight Bachelor (Kt)	1971
	Order of St John (K.StJ)	Knight of Grace; 1998
	1939–1945 Star	
	France and Germany Star	
	Defence Medal	
	War Medal	
	Queen Elizabeth II Coronation Medal	1953
	Queen Elizabeth II Silver Jubilee Medal	1977; UK version of this medal
	Queen Elizabeth II Golden Jubilee Medal	2002; UK version of this medal

Watkins was knighted in 1971. He was made a member of the Privy Council in 1980. Appointed Knight Grand Cross of the Order of the British Empire (GBE) in 1990 and Knight of Grace of the Order of St John (K.StJ) in 1998, on 12 April 2006 he was made a Freeman of the City of Cardiff, with Lord Mayor Freda Salway describing Watkins as "one of Wales' most notable citizens."

His VC and other honours are on display in the Lord Ashcroft Gallery at the Imperial War Museum, London.

=== Appointments ===
- Deputy lieutenant of Glamorgan (4 May 1956)
- Honorary Fellow of the Royal College of Surgeons of England (1992)
- President of the University of Wales College of Medicine (1987–1998)
- President of the Royal British Legion in Wales (1947–1968)
- President of the Welsh Rugby Union (1993–2004)
- Vice President of the Victoria Cross and George Cross Association (2002–2007)

=== Honorary degrees ===
Watkins was awarded several honorary degrees, including

- University of Wales, LL. D. (1976)
- University of Glamorgan, LL. D. (1996)

=== Statue ===
A statue of Watkins was commissioned to stand outside Gate C of the Millennium Stadium. The statue, nine feet tall, was sculpted by Llantwit Major based sculptor Roger Andrews. The Assembly Government contributed £25,000, among other contributions.

== See also ==
- British VCs of World War 2 (John Laffin, 1997)
- Monuments to Courage (David Harvey, 1999)
- The Register of the Victoria Cross (This England, 1997)
