= Donald Harrison (surgeon) =

British surgeon

Donald Harrison FRCS
- Born: Donald Frederick Norris Harrison; March 9, 1925
- Died: April 12, 2003 (aged 78)
- Occupation: Surgeon
- Medical career
- Institutions: Guy's Hospital, Royal Gwent Hospital, The Royal Air Force, The Royal National Throat, Nose and Ear Hospital

Sir Donald Frederick Norris Harrison FRCS (9 March 1925 – 12 April 2003) was a British surgeon

He was the son of Frederick William Rees Harrison OBE JP of Portsmouth, the Principal of the College of Technology for Monmouthshire. Educated at Newport High School, he then held junior posts at Guy's Hospital and the Royal Gwent Hospital, Newport, followed by National Service in the Royal Air Force, acquiring in the process a particular interest in ear, nose and throat surgery.

In 1962, he was appointed consultant surgeon to the Royal National Ear, Nose and Throat Hospital before becoming in 1963 a professor at the Institute of Laryngology and Otology, now part of the UCL Ear Institute. There he publicly campaigned against the dangers of chewing tobacco. He retired in 1990 and was knighted for his services in the field of ear, nose and throat surgery. He was elected President of the Royal Society of Medicine in 1994, serving until 1996.

His published work "The Anatomy and Physiology of the Mammalian Larynx"" (Cambridge University Press), 1995) was largely based on his personal collection of some thousand mammalian larynges.

He died in 2003. He had married Audrey Clubb, with whom he had two daughters.
