= Gus Merry =

Wales dual-code international rugby footballer

- Born: James Augustus Merry; 24 November 1887 Newport, Wales
- Died: 14 December 1943 (aged 56) Newport, Wales
- Occupation: Crane driver

Rugby union career
- Position: Hooker
Amateur team(s)
Years	Team	Apps	(Points)
- Pill Harriers RFC
International career
Years	Team	Apps	(Points)
1912	Wales	2	(0)
- Rugby league career

Playing information
- Position: Back
Club
Years	Team	Pld	T	G	FG	P
1912–14	Hull F.C.	35
Representative
Years	Team	Pld	T	G	FG	P
1913	Wales	1				0

James Augustus Merry (24 November 1887 – 14 December 1943) was a Welsh international rugby hooker who played rugby union for Pill Harriers and rugby league with Hull FC. He won two caps for Wales at rugby union and later represented the Wales rugby league team in 1913.

== Rugby career ==
Merry was born c. 1888, in Newport, Wales. A crane driver by profession, he played amateur rugby for Pill Harriers, a notably tough team that played in Newport. Merry made his international début for Wales during the 1912 Five Nations Championship, in a much changed team for the encounter with Ireland. In the first two matches of the campaign, Wales had lost to England, but then beat Scotland. Despite the win over Scotland, the Ireland match saw the Welsh selectors bring in seven new caps, five of them in the pack. The inexperience of the Welsh team showed on the day and Wales were beaten 12–5, after the Welsh led 5–0 at half time. Merry played one final game for Wales under the union code, the last match of the 1912 Championship, played in his home town of Newport against France. After a slow start Wales came through to narrowly beat the French, who were a weak team in their infancy.

It is unknown if Merry would have gained any further caps for the Welsh union team as in 1912 he switched to the professional code, joining Hull. He made his début on 5 September and played 35 games for Hull. On 15 February 1913, Merry was selected to play for the Wales rugby league team, making him a dual-code international. His only cap for Wales was against England, played at Plymouth. Wales lost 16–40. In 1919 he made a failed application to rejoin the union code.

== Bibliography ==
- Jenkins, John M.; et al. (1991). Who's Who of Welsh International Rugby Players. Wrexham: Bridge Books. ISBN 1-872424-10-4.
