= Pill Harriers RFC =

Welsh rugby union club, based in Newport

Coordinates: 51°34′32.00″N 2°59′38.14″W

(Wales) Pill Harriers RFC
- Full name: Pill Harriers Rugby Football Club
- Nickname(s): Pill, The Harriers
- Founded: 1882; 144 years ago
- Location: Pillgwenlly, Newport
- Ground(s): Court-Y-Bella Terrace, Newport
- Chairman: Brian Stewart Cromwell
- Coach: Nick Payne
- Captain: Bradley Williams
- League: WRU Division Two East
- 2011-12: 2nd
Team kit

Official website
- www.pillharriers.com

Pill Harriers RFC are a Welsh rugby union club based in Newport in South Wales. The club is a member of the Welsh Rugby Union and is a feeder club for the Newport Gwent Dragons.

== Club origins ==
At the end of Jeddo Street, Baldwin Street and Marion Street in Pill was an area of bogland which was filled with ballast from ships calling at the Old Town Dock, North Dock and Alexandra Dock. The local Pill boys played many games on ‘The ballast’ as it was then called. They played Pêl Fas, soccer and their own brand of rugby.

Eventually a team was formed to play general sports called ‘The Curb Stone Dashers’. The jerseys were black or navy seaman’s jerseys. They played for about three years and then in 1879-80 Liverpool House opened, an establishment that employed a lot of young people with the intention of keeping them out of trouble. With the influx of the Curb Stone Dashers they turned to rugby.

In about 1881-82 Lord Tredegar gave the people of Pill a ground on built up swampland on the 'Mendalgief'.

At this time Liverpool House went to the Pill ground, and with the dockers and coaltrimmers formed Pill Harriers RFC.

== Early years ==
The first season was successful and saw the club reaching the semi-finals of the Newport Challenge cup.

Although the Pill Harriers Athletic Club provided facilities for all sports, it was rugby that had pride of place. After the turn of the century Pill became one of the strongest sides in the area becoming Monmouthshire League Champions five times and runners up three times between 1902 and 1912. During this period Pill Harriers provided a stream of intelligent, strong players who would first move to first class team Newport before playing for Wales. George "Twyber" Travers, rugby’s first specialist hooker, gained 25 caps between 1903 and 1911 and played a pivotal role in the new scrum techniques which Wales adopted in the Match of the Century victory against New Zealand in 1905, George Boots gained 16 caps between 1908 and 1904, Tommy Vile who would become president of the WRU and Gus Merry who gained 2 caps in 1912. Gus's caps and photos were donated to the Pill Harriers club in about 1996 by his great-nephew Glyn Maggs.

On 12 April 1919, Pill Harriers played host to the touring New Zealand Army team. 10,000 people turned up at Mendalgief Road to watch George Boots lead out the Harriers to a respectable 0-0 draw.

After the first World War came the Harriers' most successful season ever, playing 32 games, winning 30, drawing 2 and scoring a total of 737 points. In the course of the "invincible season", the club fielded at least eight players who were to gain international honours when later playing for other clubs. Two players were capped from the Harriers at this time – Jerry Shea and Jack Whitfield. Both players went on to gain further caps whilst playing for Newport.

The Harriers continued to grow until the outbreak of war in 1939, when the ground was taken over for vital industrial purposes. The club was closed down for the duration of hostilities. A new pitch in Pill was unavailable at the end of the war and no alternative was found. Therefore, on 3 June 1947 one of the most famous clubs in South Wales was wound up.

== Modern history ==
In 1978, the Pill Harriers was reformed by the amalgamation of two local clubs, Newport Hibernians and Pill Labour.

The first season was successful with the club involved in four finals whilst reaching the semi-finals of the Welsh Brewers Cup. During this early period, Pill gained success in all competitions proving their versatility in both 15 and 7-a-side games. Honours for many individual players followed with many representing the club at Newport and district level whilst Gerald Palmer and Tommy Corten gained caps at Welsh District level.

The success on the pitch was soon to result in the Harriers opening their new pitch Pill Grounds followed by the building of a clubhouse and changing rooms.

In 1986, Pill Harriers gained Welsh Rugby Union membership, and they entered the Monmouthshire league. Pill continued the success of previous years winning the third and second divisions in consecutive years. In 1987 Pill registered its most famous victory when defeating Newport RFC at Rodney Parade 12-4.

Once again individual honours were gained in the form of Monmouthshire caps by Matthew Clarke, Stan Henshaw, Keiran O’Connell and Jeff Harris.

== Notable former players ==
See also Category:Pill Harriers RFC players

- (Wales) Len Attewell (3 caps)
- (Wales) George Boots
- (Wales) William "Bill" Aaron Everson
- (Wales) Trevor J. F. Foster
- (Wales) Thomas Jones
- (Wales) Gus Merry
- (Wales) Jerry Shea (4 caps)
- (Wales) Albert Stock
- (Wales) George Travers (25 caps)
- (Wales) William 'Bunner' Travers
- (Wales) Len Trump
- (Wales) Harry Wetter
- (Wales) Jack Wetter
- (Wales) Jack Whitfield (12 caps)
