= Stanley Williams (rugby union, born 1886) =

British Lions & England international rugby union footballer

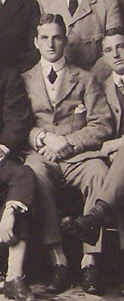
- Born: Horatio Stanley Williams; 2 November 1885 Rogerstone, Newport, Wales
- Died: 30 April 1936 (aged 50) Atlantic Ocean
- School: Newport Intermediate School

Rugby union career
- Position: Fullback
Amateur team(s)
Years	Team	Apps	(Points)
1901–1911	Newport RFC		
International career
Years	Team	Apps	(Points)
1911	England	4	(0)
1910	British Lions	3	(0)

Horatio Stanley Williams DSO (2 November 1885 – 30 April 1936) was a Welsh rugby union fullback who played club rugby for Newport. He won 4 caps for England and was selected for the British Lions 1910 tour of South Africa, in which he played in all three test games. He was the youngest son of Rev Basil Williams, the vicar of Risca.

== Rugby career ==
Williams first played for Newport in 1901 and was part of the team that faced the touring 1908 Australians. Whilst with Newport he had several trials with Wales and was at one stage selected as a reserve for the team, but was never officially selected to represent his birth country. In 1910 Williams was one of five Newport players chosen to represent the British Isles on their tour of South Africa. Williams played in all three test matches.

When the English rugby union invoked Newport's rugby union membership Williams switched his international allegiance to England. Williams was first capped for England on 21 January 1911 when he played against Wales at St Helens. England lost the match 11–15, but in the second game of the Championship Williams finished on the winning side when the English team crushed France 37–0. Williams played in the next two games for England when they lost in tight game to Ireland and beat Scotland to leave them with the Wooden Spoon.

=== International matches played ===
England

- France 1911
- Ireland 1911
- Scotland 1911
- Wales 1911

British Isles

- South Africa 1910, 1910, 1910

== Later life ==
Williams served his country during World War I, and was awarded the Distinguished Service Order for his actions during the conflict.

In 1936, on a return trip from Rio de Janeiro to Southampton on the Royal Mail ship Arlanza, Williams fell overboard and was declared lost.

His daughter, Christine Stanley Williams, who accompanied him on the trip on the Arlanza, married Sir David Peel Yates.
