= Roy Burnett =

Wales international rugby union footballer

- Born: Roy Burnett; 6 October 1926 Abercarn, Wales
- Died: 30 July 1998 (aged 71) Caerleon, Wales

Rugby union career
- Position: Fly-half
Amateur team(s)
Years	Team	Apps	(Points)
- Abercarn RFC
1947-1959	Newport RFC		
–	Barbarian F.C.		
–	Devon		
International career
Years	Team	Apps	(Points)
1953	Wales	1	(0)

Roy Burnett (6 October 1926 – 30 July 1998) was a Wales international rugby union player who also played for the Barbarians.

Burnett made 373 appearances for Newport RFC. He captained the team in the 1952–53 season and also in 1950–51 in the absence of Ken Jones.

Burnett was unlucky only to win one cap for the Wales national rugby union team primarily because he had to compete against Cliff Morgan.

Burnett turned town an offer of £3000 (based on increases in average earnings, this would be approximately £185,500 in 2013) to change codes to rugby league and join Huddersfield.
