= Alison Bielski =

Welsh poet and writer (1925–2014)

- Born: Alison Joy Prosser; 24 November 1925; Newport, Wales
- Died: 9 July 2014 (aged 88); Whitchurch, Cardiff, Wales
- Other name: Alison Joy Treverton-Jones

Alison Joy Bielski (née Prosser, previously Treverton-Jones; 24 November 1925 – 9 July 2014), was a Welsh poet and writer, whose works included the Flower Legends of Wales and Tales and Traditions of Tenby. She has also published several booklets on local history, including Flower Legends of Wales in 1974, Tales and Traditions of Tenby in 1981 and The Story of St Mellons in 1985. Between 1969 and 1974 Bielski was also the honorary joint secretary of the English-language section of Yr Academi Gymreig, the national association of writers in Wales.

== Early life and education ==
Romola House, Tenby

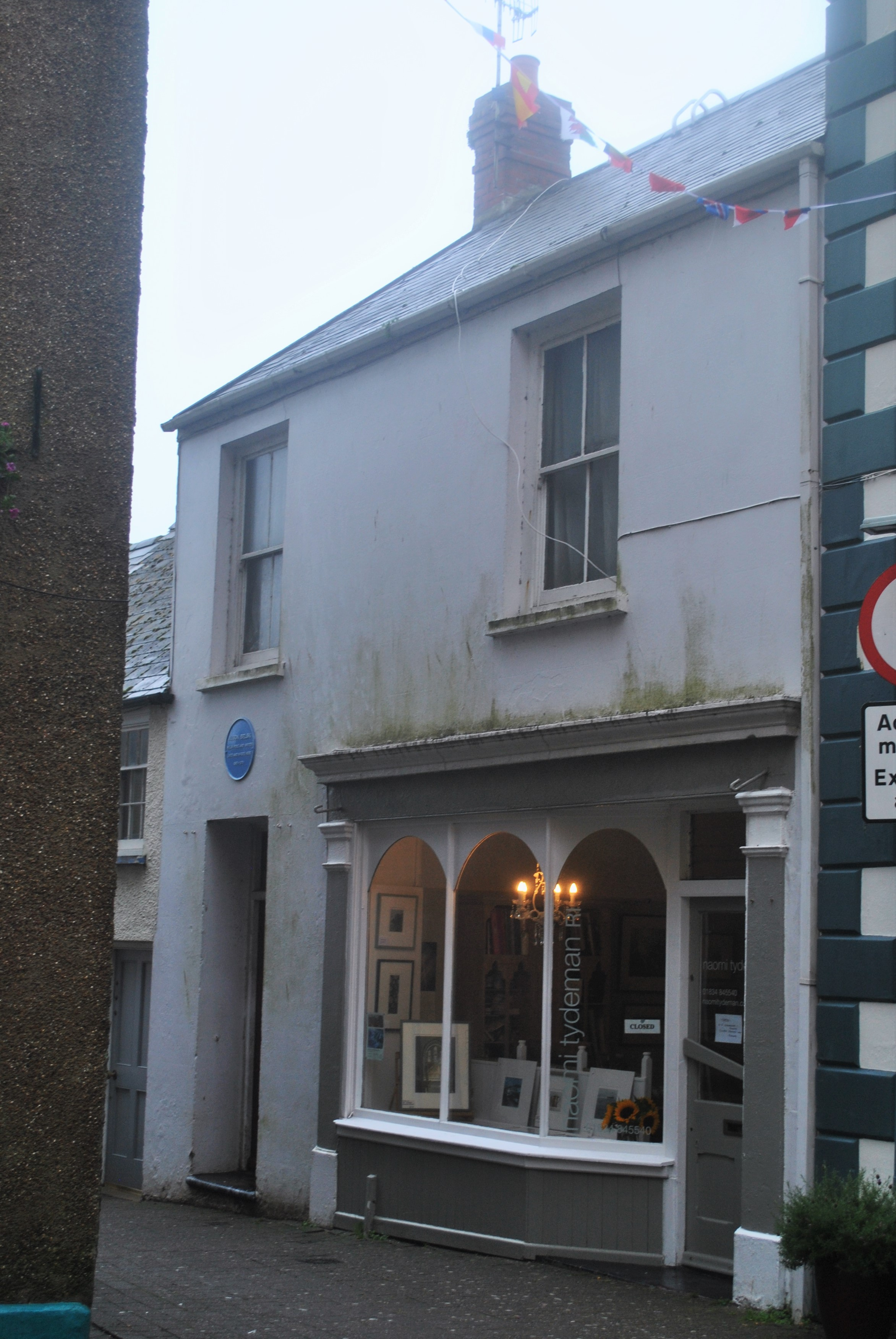
Romola House, Cob Lane

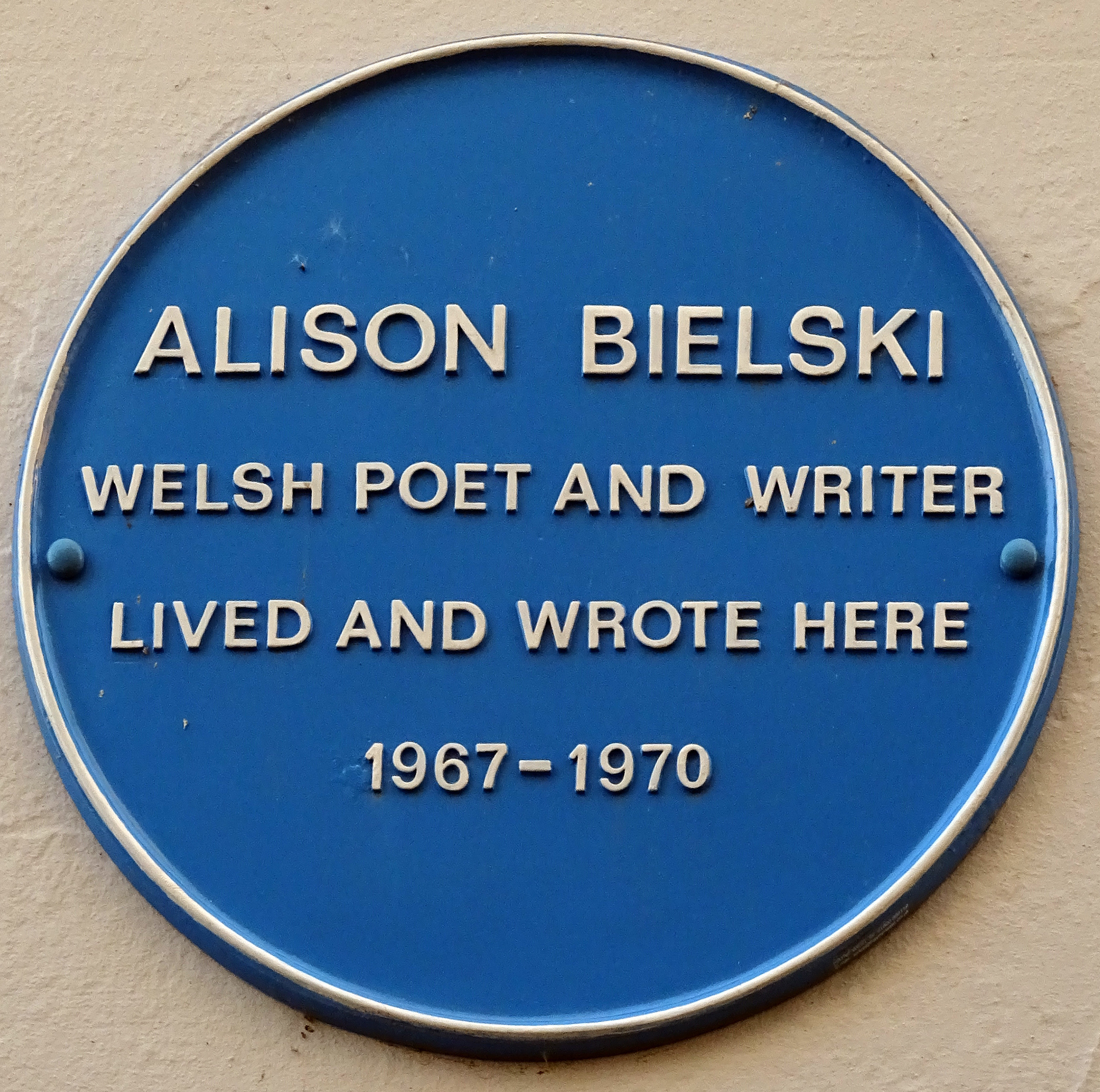
Blue plaque commemorating that Bielski lived at Romola House

She was born on 24 November 1925 in Newport, Monmouthshire, Wales. Her family, the Morris Prossers had lived in the district around Tintern Abbey, Monmouthshire since the 11th century.

Bielski attended Newport High School until she was 16. She then went on to attend secretarial training before becoming the private secretary to the press officer of the Bristol Aeroplane Company in 1945. Later she worked in her family's engineering business. Her first marriage was to Dennis Treverton-Jones in 1948, which ended with her husband's death in 1950. They had one son, Ronald. She then took a new position as a welfare secretary to the British Red Cross in Cardiff. She married Anthony Bielski in 1955 and became a "writer-housewife". They had one daughter together, Helen.

== Career ==
Bielski's poems were first published by small printers. She made her debut with Twentieth-Century Flood, published by Howard Sergeant on the Outposts imprint in 1964, and four years later by Shapes and Colours, published by the Triskel Press in Wales. Her first hardbacked book was Across the Burning Sand in 1970.

During her lifetime her works were considered too "modern", too "experimental", too "difficult" because punctuation was reduced to a minimum and no upper-case letters were used in her works.

Her works include numerous collections and she regularly contributed to magazines. She often drew inspiration from Welsh folklore and mythology. Her poetry has been published in India, the United Kingdom, the United States, and many European countries. Her book The Story of the Welsh Dragon, was chosen by a panel chaired by Lord Snowdon as one of the official souvenirs on the Investiture of the Prince of Wales in 1969.

== Death ==
She died on 9 July 2014 and was cremated at Thornhill Crematorium in Cardiff on 24 July. She had one son and daughter, six grandchildren and one great-grandson.

== Bibliography ==
- Twentieth Century Flood 1964
- Story of the Welsh Dragon (with Claude Page) 1969 ISBN 978-0901906007
- Across the Burning Sand 1970 ISBN 978-0850880731
- 20 monogrampoems 1971
- Flower legends of Wales 1972 ISBN 978-0950256207
- Zodiacpoems (with Peter Barnfield and Ginny Barnfield) 1973 ISBN 978-0950256221
- Shapes and Colours 1973 ISBN 978-0950256214
- Eve 1973 ISBN 978-0903226455
- Mermaid Poems 1974 ISBN 978-0950284316
- Flower Legends of the Wye Valley 1974 ISBN 978-0950256245
- The Lovetree 1974 ISBN 978-0715401361
- Mobiles 1979 ISBN 978-0861622498
- Discovering Islands 1979 ISBN 978-0905761077
- Seth: A Poem Sequence 1980 ISBN 978-0905049663
- Tales and Traditions of Old Tenby 1981 ISBN 978-0901906175
- Night Sequence 1981 ISBN 978-0950256252
- Sacramental Sonnets: a Poem Cycle, 1982 2003 ISBN 978-0907117896
- Eagles, 1983 ISBN 978-0907117193
- Story of St.Mellons 1985 ISBN 978-0907117414
- That Crimson Flame 1996 ISBN 978-3705207844
- The Green-eyed Pool 1998 ISBN 978-3705201262
- One of Our Skylarks 2010 ISBN 978-1907090219
