= Malcolm Thomas (rugby union) =

British Lions & Wales international rugby union footballer

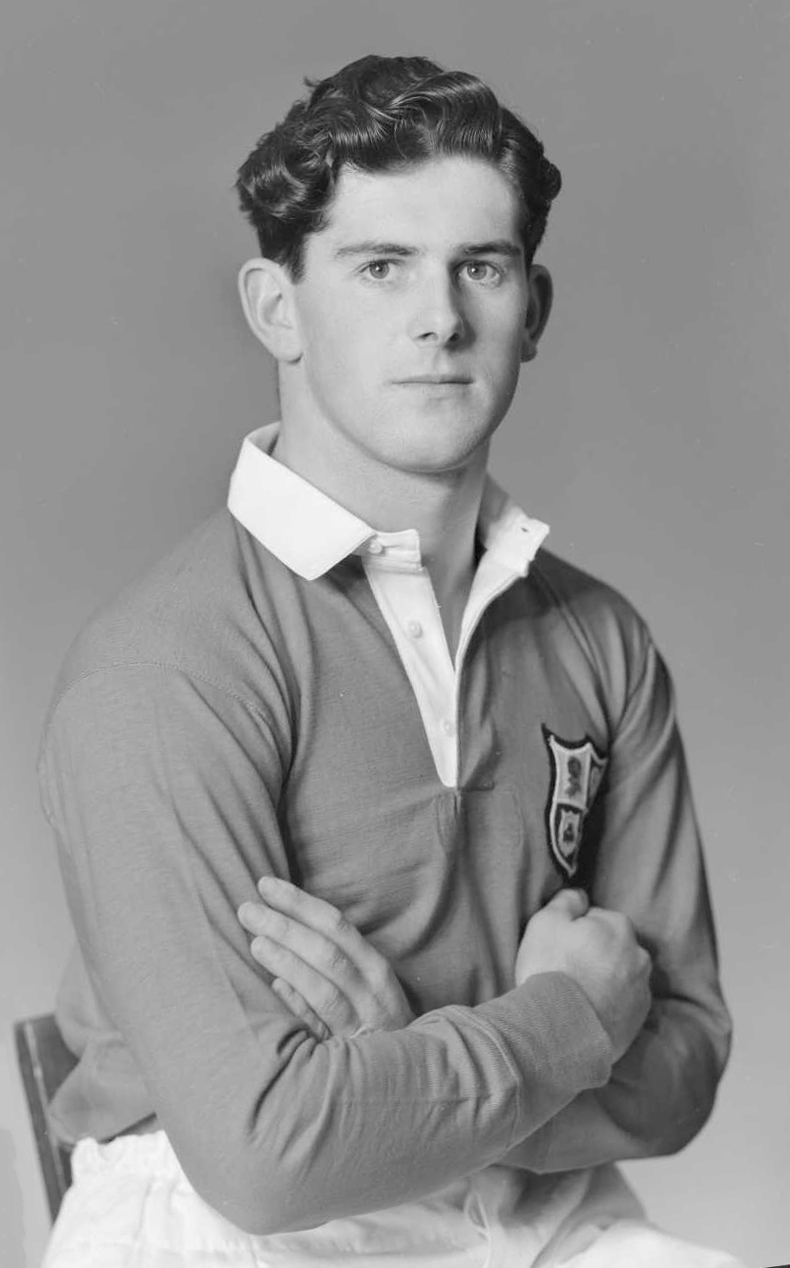
- Thomas in New Zealand in 1950
- Born: Malcolm Campbell Thomas; 25 April 1929 Machen, Wales
- Died: 9 April 2012 (aged 82) Burnham, England
- Height: 5 ft 10 in (1.78 m)
- Weight: 13 st 10 lb (87 kg; 192 lb)
- School: Bassaleg Grammar School
- University: Caerleon Training College

Rugby union career
- Position: Centre
Amateur team(s)
Years	Team	Apps	(Points)
- Devonport Services R.F.C.
1946–1959	Newport RFC		
- London Welsh RFC
1950–1958	Barbarian F.C.		
International career
Years	Team	Apps	(Points)
1949–1959	Wales	27	(22)
1950–1959	British Lions	4	(0)

Malcolm Campbell Thomas (25 April 1929 – 9 April 2012) was a Welsh and British Lions international rugby union player. A centre, he played club rugby for Newport. He won 27 caps for Wales and was selected to play in the British Lions on two tours of Australia and New Zealand.

After his rugby career Thomas became a successful business man. He died on 9 April 2012 in Burnham, Buckinghamshire.

== Early and club career ==
Born in Machen in 1929, Thomas went to school at Bassaleg Grammar and was chosen for the Welsh Secondary Schools rugby and cricket teams, before attending Caerleon Training College. After qualifying from college he became an instructor-lieutenant in the Royal Navy, playing for and captaining Devonport Services before playing for the Navy XV.

He joined Newport in 1946 and played against South Africa (1952), New Zealand (1954) and Australia (1957) for the club. A versatile player, Thomas found himself being moved between centre and wing and was chosen many times due to his ability as a utility back. He was also recognized as an accurate placekicker and was strong in the tackle, with a powerful hand-off. Thomas also represented Cornwall and Monmouthshire at county level, and played invitational matches for the Barbarians and Crawshays. In 1958 ha was a member of the 1958 touring Barbarian team that played in Africa, scoring a try and two conversions in the win over East Africa.

He also played cricket for Cornwall in the 1951 Minor Counties Championship, making four appearances.

== International career ==
Thomas made his debut against France in 1949 in an away game at the Stade de Colombes, Paris, which Wales lost. The selectors kept faith with Thomas and he turned out for the next four Five Nations Tournament games, which saw Wales win the Grand Slam in 1950, the first time since 1911. Thomas was also part of the Wales Grand Slam team in 1952. In 1953 he was dropped from the squad as the selectors believed his play was becoming stale and was blamed for a bad pass in the game against England. In a 1954/55 pre-season club trial he broke a leg, however he was back playing for Newport the next season and a return to club form saw his return to the Welsh side. On 19 January 1957 he was awarded the captaincy of Wales against England, and again later in the season against Scotland.

=== International matches played ===
Wales

- England 1950, 1951, 1952, 1953, 1956, 1957, 1959
- France 1949, 1950, 1951, 1952, 1956, 1958, 1959
- Ireland 1950, 1951, 1952, 1956, 1958, 1959
- Scotland 1950, 1951, 1952, 1956, 1957. 1958
- South Africa 1951

British Lions

- Australia 1950
- New Zealand 1950, 1950, 1959

== Bibliography ==
- Smith, David; Williams, Gareth (1980). Fields of Praise: The Official History of The Welsh Rugby Union. Cardiff: University of Wales Press. ISBN 0-7083-0766-3.
