= Reginald Phillips (cricketer) =

Welsh cricketer

Personal information
- Full name: Reginald Maurice Phillips
- Born: 19 October 1897; Newport, Monmouthshire, Wales
- Died: 7 June 1963 (aged 65); Budleigh Salterton, Devon, England
- Batting: Unknown
- Bowling: Unknown

Domestic team information
- Years: Team
- 1925: Wales

Career statistics
Competition	First-class
Matches	1
Runs scored	13
Batting average	6.50
100s/50s	–/–
Top score	11
Balls bowled	–
Wickets	–
Bowling average	–
5 wickets in innings	–
10 wickets in match	–
Best bowling	–
Catches/stumpings	–/–
- Source: Cricinfo, 28 August 2011

Reginald Maurice Phillips (19 October 1897 – 7 June 1964) was a Welsh cricketer. Phillips' batting and bowling styles are unknown. He was born in Monmouth, Monmouthshire. He was the son of brewer Fred Phillips, who was at the time the managing director of Phillips & Sons Brewery.

Phillips made his debut for Monmouthshire against the Surrey Second XI in the 1921 County Championship. He played Minor counties cricket for Monmouthshire from 1921 to 1934, making 19 appearances. During this period he made a single first-class appearance for Wales against the Marylebone Cricket Club in 1925. He scored 11 runs in the Welsh first-innings before being dismissed by Joseph North, while in the second-innings he was dismissed for 2 runs by Jack Hearne.

Despite coming from a family which ran a brewery, Phillips appears to have shown little interest in the business. He died in Budleigh Salterton, Devon, England on 7 June 1964.
