= Jerry Shea =

Welsh rugby union and rugby league footballer

Personal information
- Born: Jeremiah Shea; 12 August 1892 Newport, Wales
- Died: 30 June 1947 (aged 54) Newport, Wales
- Height: 5 ft 9 in (1.75 m)

Rugby union career
- Position: Centre
Amateur team(s)
Years	Team	Apps	(Points)
1919	Pill Harriers RFC		
1919–1921	Newport RFC		
International career
Years	Team	Apps	(Points)
1919–1921	Wales	4	(19)

Sport
- Rugby league career

Playing information
- Position: Back
Club
Years	Team	Pld	T	G	FG	P
1921–24	Wigan
Representative
Years	Team	Pld	T	G	FG	P
1922–23	Wales	2				0
- Boxing career
- Nationality: British
- Weight: Middleweight
- Stance: Orthodox

Boxing record
- Total fights: 69
- Wins: 52
- Win by KO: 22
- Losses: 9
- Draws: 7

Jeremiah Shea (12 August 1892 – 30 June 1947) was a Welsh international dual-code rugby centre who played club rugby for Newport and Pill Harriers under the rugby union code and later represented Wigan as a professional rugby league footballer. Shea was an all round athlete, and was an accomplished swimmer and professional boxer. He is best known as being the first rugby union player to achieve the Full House of scoring in an international match.

== Rugby union career ==
Born in Newport in 1892, Shea initially played rugby union with Pill Harriers, a notoriously tough team from Newport Docks. It was with Pill that Shea gained his first cap for Wales, against the post-war touring New Zealand Army. in 1919, like many Pill players, he switched to Newport RFC, the Harriers first-class rivals. The next year he was selected to play for Wales against England at St. Helens in the Five Nations Championship. Unsurprisingly for teams meeting for the first time since the end of the First World War, both teams contained many new caps. It was in this match that Shea would make history by scoring a try, conversion, drop goal, and penalty goal, the first player to do so at an international level. In a rain swept match, Shea opened the scoring in the first half with a penalty goal against the wind. England responded with a try and conversion, both from Harold Day, to take the first half 5–3. Within five minutes of the restart, Shea had drop kicked Wales back into the lead. With twenty minutes remaining, and the Welsh forwards in command, Shea broke through the English defence to score a try under the posts which he easily converted. Wick Powell then scored a second try for Wales, before Shea finished the match with another drop goal, for a convincing Welsh win.

The feat of achieving all four rugby union scores was held by Shea alone until Lewis Jones emulated him thirty years later when on tour with the British Lions against Australia.

Shea would play two more matches for Wales, both on the losing side. Shea found himself at the centre of a controversy before the start of the 1920 game against Scotland, when the Scottish Rugby Union threatened to pull out of the game against Wales as Shea was a professional boxer. A negative response from national newspapers towards the Scottish complaints ensured that the game went ahead. After the game, in which Scotland won 9–5; Shea was criticised in some sections of the press, for attempting to play the match against Scotland single-handed. Shea's final game was played against England on 15 January 1921. Whether or not Shea would have achieved more caps for Wales is unknown as in 1921 he turned professional by joining rugby league side Wigan in December of that year for a then record fee of £700.

=== International matches played ===
Wales

- England 1920, 1921
- New Zealand Army XV 1919
- Scotland 1920

== Rugby league career ==
Shea's first game for Wigan was on Christmas Eve, 1921, scoring a try on his début. He remained with the club for three seasons, two of them as captain, though he never moved to Wigan and always travelled to matches from Wales. On 11 December 1922 he became a dual-code international when he turned out for the Wales national rugby league team in an away match against England. He played his second and final league international match the next year, when Wales beat England 13–2 in an encounter at Wigan. After leaving Wigan, Shea was instrumental in setting up Pontypridd RLFC, a lone professional league team in Wales that competed in the Northern League, though the club failed to find support and folded the following season. Jerry Shea played at centre in Wigan's 13-2 victory over Oldham in the Championship Final during the 1921–22 season at The Cliff, Broughton on Saturday 6 May 1922. Jerry Shea played at centre in Wigan's 20–2 victory over Leigh in the 1922–23 Lancashire Cup Final during the 1922–23 season at The Willows, Salford on Saturday 25 November 1922.

== Boxing career ==
As well as a rugby player Shea was also a professional boxer, fighting in the welter and middleweight categories. Shea's first professional bout was on 18 January 1916 against Twiggy Davies at The Park Hall, in Newport. He drew the match but just two weeks later he beat Davies by points decision at the same venue. Although Shea never fought for a major belt, he faced and beat several notable fighters during his nine-year professional career. He twice faced Frank Moody, the British and Commonwealth champion, drawing on points in their first encounter in 1919, and then beating him by points in their rematch at the Empire Theatre in Cardiff the following year. Just two weeks after defeating Moody, Shea was lined up against Ted "Kid" Lewis at the Pavilion in Mountain Ash. Lewis, the former World Welterweight champion, won by a knockout in the first round. In 1920, Shea beat future European Welterweight Champion, Rene DeVos at The Ring in Blackfriars, then in 1922 he defeated the future British light-heavyweight champion Gipsy Daniels at Newport. His final recorded fight was on 17 November 1924 when he faced ex-welterweight champ, Johnny Basham. Shea won the contest on points.

== Bibliography ==
- Griffiths, John (1988). Rugby's Strangest Matches, Extraordinary but true stories from over a century of rugby. Robson Books. ISBN 1-86105-354-1.
- Smith, David; Williams, Gareth (1980). Fields of Praise: The Official History of The Welsh Rugby Union. Cardiff: University of Wales Press. ISBN 0-7083-0766-3.
