= Bunner Travers =

GB Lions & Wales international rugby union player

- Born: William Travers; 2 December 1913 Newport, Wales
- Died: 4 June 1998 (aged 84)

Rugby union career
- Position: Hooker
Amateur team(s)
Years	Team	Apps	(Points)
1928-1935	Pill Harriers RFC		
1935-1949	Newport RFC		
1938 & 1949	Cardiff RFC		
–	Barbarians		
–	Crawshays RFC		
International career
Years	Team	Apps	(Points)
1937–1949	Wales	12	(3)
1938	British Lions	2	(0)

William Travers (2 December 1913 – 4 June 1998), commonly known as Bunner Travers, was a Wales international rugby union player. He was selected for the 1938 British Lions tour to South Africa. Travers played club rugby for Newport RFC; he was the son of George Travers, also a Wales international.
