= Rex Richards (rugby union) =

Wales international rugby union footballer

- Born: Rex Clive Richards; 4 February 1934 Newport, Wales
- Died: 6 March 1989 (aged 55) Miami, United States
- School: Stow Hill Secondary Modern

Rugby union career
- Position: Prop
Amateur team(s)
Years	Team	Apps	(Points)
- Cross Keys RFC
–	Monmouthshire		
International career
Years	Team	Apps	(Points)
1956	Wales	1	(0)

Rex Clive Richards (4 February 1934 – 6 March 1989) was a Welsh international rugby union player. He gained his only cap against France at Cardiff on 24 March 1956, Wales winning 5–3. He played for Cross Keys RFC until 1955 before heading to Hollywood to try to make his fortune as an actor.

He had a number of roles, including the King of Wongo in Wild Women of Wongo in 1958. In 2008, the film was given a special screening in Cross Keys, where Richards had spent his playing career; it was the first time the film had been shown in the town.

Richards narrowly missed out on at least one role that would have made him internationally famous. He auditioned to play Tarzan and out of 1,000 people he got down to the final two, just missing out to Gordon Scott.

His nephew Julian Richards is a film director.
