= David Burcher =

- Born: David Howard Burcher; 26 October 1950 (age 76) Newport, Wales
- Height: 178 cm (5 ft 10 in)
- Weight: 85 kg (13 st 5 lb)
- School: Newport High School
- University: St. Luke's College, Exeter
- Occupation: Teacher 1975-1979

Rugby union career
- Position: Centre
Amateur team(s)
Years	Team	Apps	(Points)
1973-1979	Newport RFC	210	
–	Cardiff RFC	73	
–	Bath Rugby		
–	Barbarian F.C.		
International career
Years	Team	Apps	(Points)
1977	Wales	4	(0)
1977	British Lions	1	(0)

David Howard Burcher (born 26 October 1950) is a former Wales international rugby union player. He was capped four times for Wales in 1977 and that same year he toured New Zealand with the British & Irish Lions, playing in one international. Burcher played club rugby for Newport RFC.
