= George Travers (rugby union) =

Wales international rugby union player

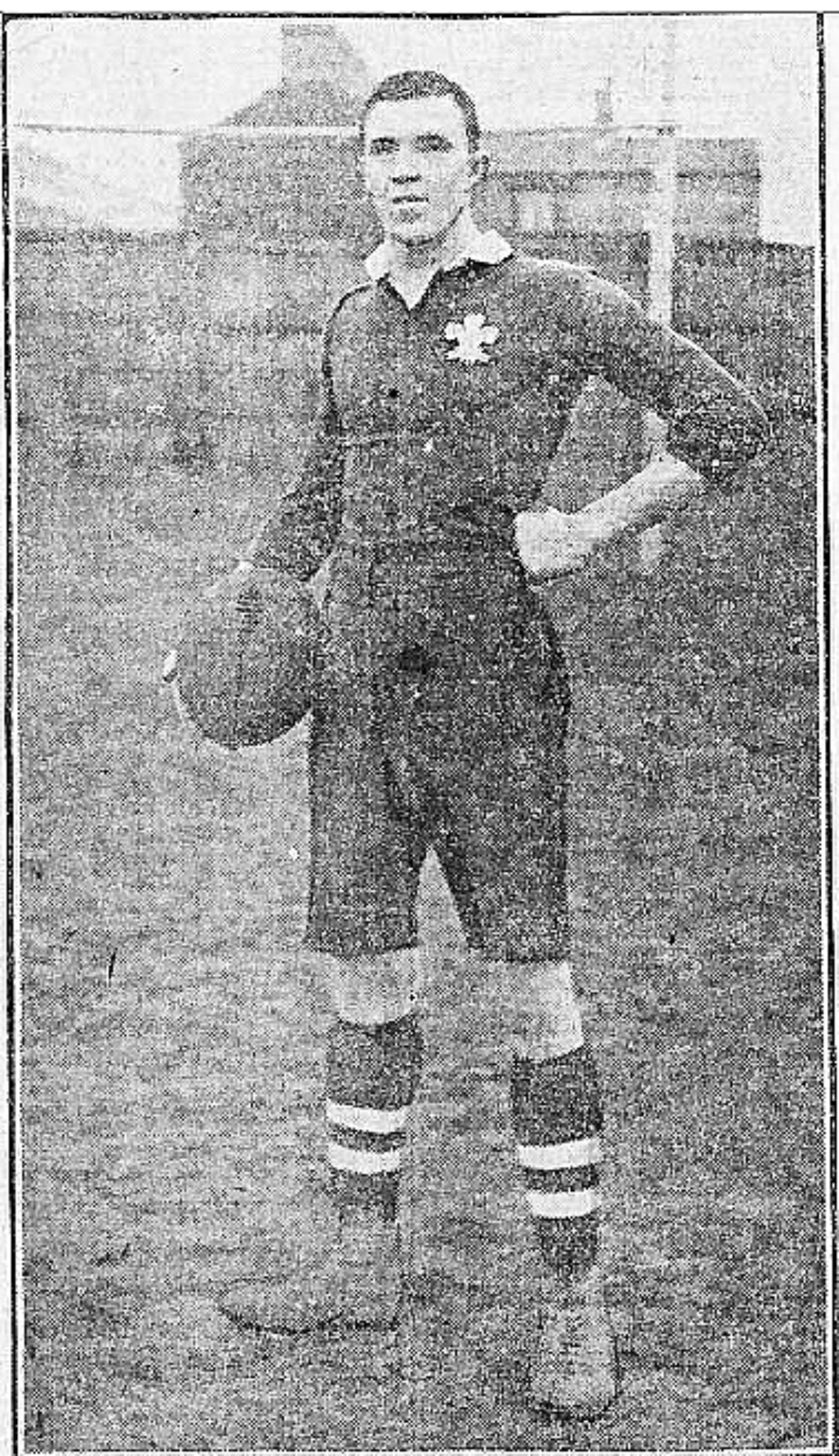
- Born: George Travers; 9 June 1877 Newport, Wales
- Died: 26 December 1945 (aged 68) Newport, Wales
- Height: 6 ft 0 in (183 cm)
- Weight: 12 st (168 lb; 76 kg)
- School: Trinity Church School, Newport
- Notable relative(s): Bunner Travers, son
- Occupation: coal trimmer

Rugby union career
- Position: Hooker
Amateur team(s)
Years	Team	Apps	(Points)
- Mountain Ash RFC
–	Pill Harriers RFC		
–	Newport RFC		
–	Monmouthshire		
International career
Years	Team	Apps	(Points)
1903-1911	Wales	25	(3)

George "Twyber" Travers (9 June 1877 – 26 December 1945) was a Welsh international hooker who played club rugby for Pill Harriers and Newport Rugby Football Club. He won 25 caps for Wales between 1903 and 1911.

Travers is seen as one of the rugby union's first specialist hookers. Specialism in a forward position was unusual during the early history of rugby mainly due to the scrummaging rule, but Travers's ability shone through and as part of a seven-man pack was important in the Welsh wins against England in 1903 and in the famous Match of the Century victory against the All Blacks in 1905. Travers originally played club rugby for the Newport Docks-based side Pill Harriers, though he would later spend two seasons with Newport in 1901/02 and 1910/11.

== International career ==
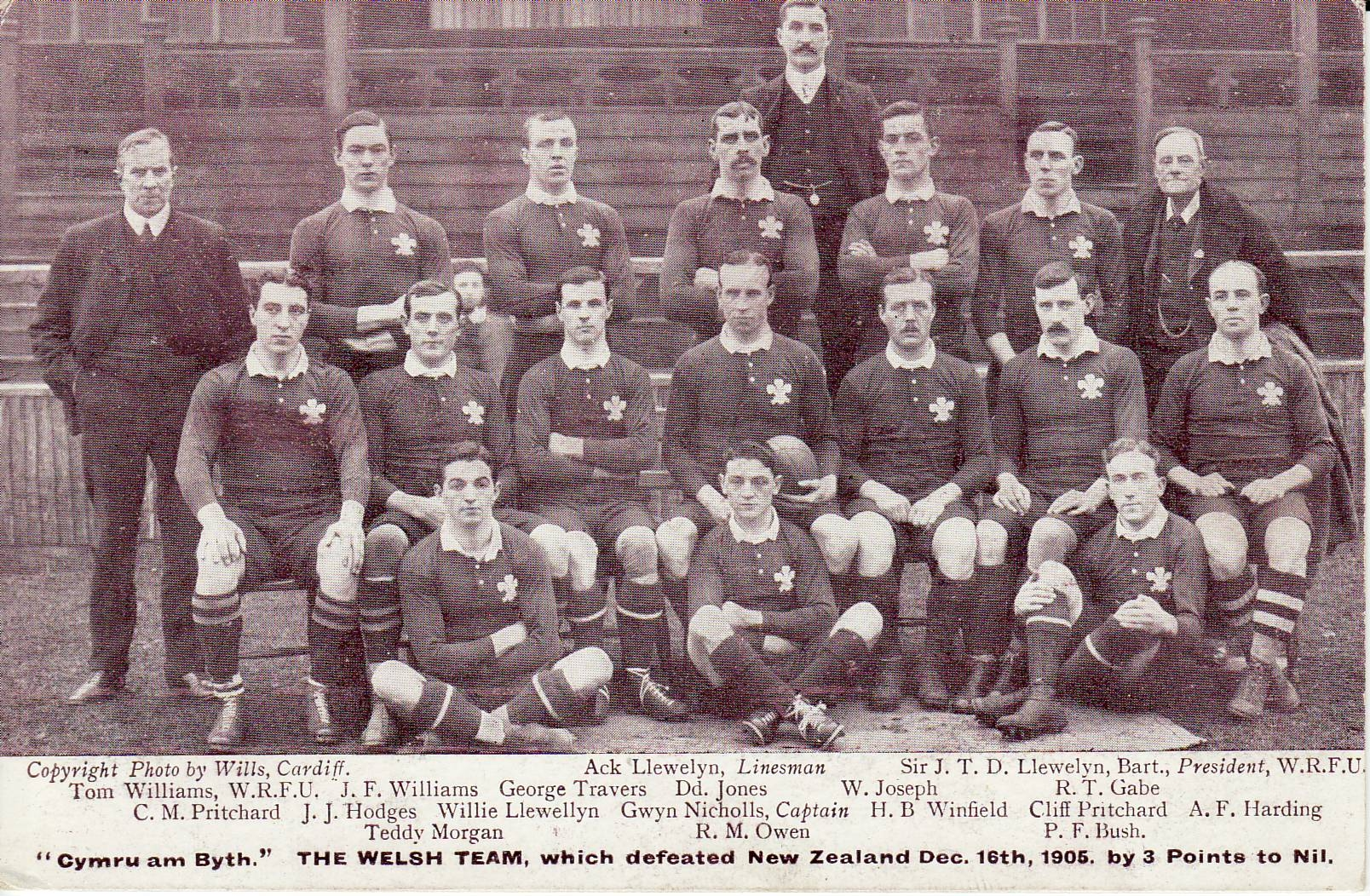
1905 Wales squad, Travers, back row, third from left

Travers was first capped, at centre, making his debut against England in January, 1903 while playing for Pill Harriers. Although it was unusual at the time for unfashionable "second-class" clubs to supply international players, it was not unprecedented, with valley teams such as Treorchy and Treherbert supplying several forwards. He would play for Wales a further 24 times including games against the original New Zealand team, South Africa and Australia. In 1908 Travers was awarded the Welsh captaincy against Scotland at Swansea a game Wales would win 6-5, though this was the only time he would hold this honour. His only international points were against the Australian Wallabies, a game Wales won 9-6, though it has been later recognised by both sides that Travers dropped the ball before going over the line and the try should not have counted.

=== International matches played ===
Wales

- Australia 1908
- England 1903, 1905, 1906, 1907, 1908, 1909
- France 1908, 1911
- Ireland 1903, 1905, 1906, 1907, 1908, 1909, 1911
- New Zealand 1905
- Scotland 1903, 1905, 1906, 1907, 1908, 1909, 1911
- South Africa 1906

== Bibliography ==
- Parry-Jones, David (1999). Prince Gwyn, Gwyn Nicholls and the First Golden Era of Welsh Rugby. Bridgend: seren. ISBN 1-85411-262-7.
- Smith, David; Williams, Gareth (1980). Fields of Praise: The Official History of The Welsh Rugby Union. Cardiff: University of Wales Press. ISBN 0-7083-0766-3.
- Thomas, Wayne (1979). A Century of Welsh Rugby Players. Ansells Ltd.
