= Jack Wetter =

Wales international rugby union player

- Born: John James Wetter; 29 December 1887 Newport, Wales
- Died: 29 July 1967 (aged 79) Newport, Wales
- Notable relative(s): Harry Wetter, brother

Rugby union career
- Position: fly-half
Amateur team(s)
Years	Team	Apps	(Points)
- Blaina RFC
- Pill Harriers RFC
1912-1925	Newport RFC		
–	Monmouthshire		
International career
Years	Team	Apps	(Points)
1914-1924	Wales	10	(14)

Jack Wetter DCM (29 December 1887 – 29 July 1967) was a Welsh international rugby union player who played club rugby predominantly for Newport. He was captain for both his club and country and earned 10 caps for Wales.

Wetter's rugby career was disrupted by the outbreak of World War I, in which he served. He was awarded the Distinguished Conduct Medal during the conflict.

== Rugby career ==
After playing club rugby for several lower-level teams Wetter was successful at a trial for Newport, and in 1912 he represented the team against Plymouth. Wetter stayed with the club until 1925, and in the 1922/23 season, in which Newport were unbeaten, he captained the team. He also played for two Newport teams against international opposition; the 1912 touring South Africans and the 1924 touring All Blacks.

Wetter made his debut for Wales against Scotland on 7 February 1914, in which he scored his first international try and Wales ran out winners 24–5. It was a rough game, in which, Scotland captain David Bain quoted, "The dirtier side won". Wetter would earn 10 caps in total for Wales, stretched either side of the War, and in the last three was awarded the captaincy. He scored a total of four international tries and a single conversion.

When Wetter took to the pitch for his final game for Wales in 1924, he was 36 years and one month old, the oldest Welsh player to take the position at centre. This record would stand for 77 years, until beaten by Neath's Allan Bateman.

=== International games played ===
Wales

- England 1920, 1921
- Ireland 1914, 1920, 1924
- France 1914, 1920
- New Zealand 1924
- Scotland 1914, 1920

== Bibliography ==
- Parry-Jones, David (1999). Prince Gwyn, Gwyn Nicholls and the First Golden Era of Welsh Rugby. Bridgend: seren. ISBN 1-85411-262-7.
- Smith, David; Williams, Gareth (1980). Fields of Praise: The Official History of The Welsh Rugby Union. Cardiff: University of Wales Press. ISBN 0-7083-0766-3.
- Godwin, Terry (1984). The International Rugby Championship 1883-1983. Grafton Street, London: Willow Books. ISBN 0-00-218060-X.
