= John Evans (rugby union, born 1911) =

- Born: John Raymond Evans; 12 September 1911 Newport, Wales
- Died: 8 March 1943 (aged 31) Sedjenane, French Tunisia
- School: Newport High School

Rugby union career
- Position: Hooker
Amateur team(s)
Years	Team	Apps	(Points)
1929–1930	Chiltern RFC, London Welsh RFC		
1930–1937	Newport RFC		
1935–1936	Barbarian F.C.		
International career
Years	Team	Apps	(Points)
1934	Wales	1	(0)

John Raymond Evans (12 September 1911 – 8 March 1943) was a Welsh international rugby union hooker who played club rugby for Newport. Evans joined Newport after showing promise as a Welsh Schools players, winning three caps while at Newport High School. Evans captained Newport on two occasions, once in 1935/36 season and again in 1936/37. In 1935 Evans captained Newport against the touring New Zealand team.

Evans made his one and only international appearance against England in the 1934 Home Nations Championship, and was given the captaincy. He was one of 13 new caps to play for Wales, with only Claude Davey and Dai Thomas with any past international experience. Wales came a poor second, losing 9–0. The selectors were severely criticized for their choice, not only because of the teams inexperience, but also because seven of the team played their rugby outside Wales. Evans was one of five players from the Welsh team that day that became one cap wonders.

Evans was killed in action while serving his country in North Africa during the Second World War. Whilst serving in 3rd Battalion, Parachute Regiment, Evans parachuted into French Tunisia in November 1942 and was fatally shot by a sniper while defending Sedjenane crossroads in March 1943.

== International matches played ==
Wales

- England 1934

== Bibliography ==
- Smith, David; Williams, Gareth (1980). Fields of Praise: The Official History of The Welsh Rugby Union. Cardiff: University of Wales Press. ISBN 0-7083-0766-3.
