= Newport RFC =

Welsh rugby union club, based in Newport

(Wales) Newport RFC
- Full name: Newport Rugby Football Club
- Union: Welsh Rugby Union
- Nickname(s): Black & Ambers
- Founded: 1874; 152 years ago
- Location: Newport, Wales
- Ground(s): Newport Stadium, Newport (Capacity: 5,058)
- Chairman: Mark Workman
- Coach: Ty Morris
- Captain: Ben Roach
- Most appearances: David Waters, 702
- Top scorer: Daniel Griffiths, 1,551
- Most tries: Arthur Gould, 159
- League: Super Rygbi Cymru
- 2024-2025: Super Rygbi Cymru, 3rd
1st kit	2nd kit

Newport Rugby Football Club (Welsh: Clwb Rygbi Casnewydd) is a Welsh rugby union club based in the city of Newport, Wales. They presently play in the Super Rygbi Cymru. Until 2021 Newport RFC were based at Rodney Parade situated on the east bank of the River Usk.

Every major rugby union touring team to visit Wales has played at Rodney Parade, and all of them were beaten at least once in the twentieth century by a side who, in 1951, played in the match at Cardiff RFC that attracted what was, a world-record crowd of 48,500 for a rugby union match between two clubs.

In addition to matches against all the major national sides a highlight of the Newport season was the annual match against the Barbarians, ensuring that the Newport fans enjoyed watching world-class players to supplement the Welsh internationals who were a common feature of the 'Black and Ambers'.

Newport supplied over 150 players to the Wales national team and international players to England, Scotland, Ireland, South Africa, Czech Republic, Canada and Fiji as well as over 80 Barbarians.

Following the regionalisation of Welsh rugby in 2003, Newport RFC are now a feeder club to the Dragons regional team.

In March 2017, sale of Rodney Parade to the Welsh Rugby Union was agreed following a vote of Newport RFC shareholders. The takeover was completed on 27 June 2017 and work started to install a hybrid grass pitch for the 2017–18 rugby and football season.

In October 2021 Newport RFC relocated their home matches to Newport Stadium whilst agreeing with the WRU to play two matches per season at Rodney Parade.

== History ==
=== 1874–1914 ===
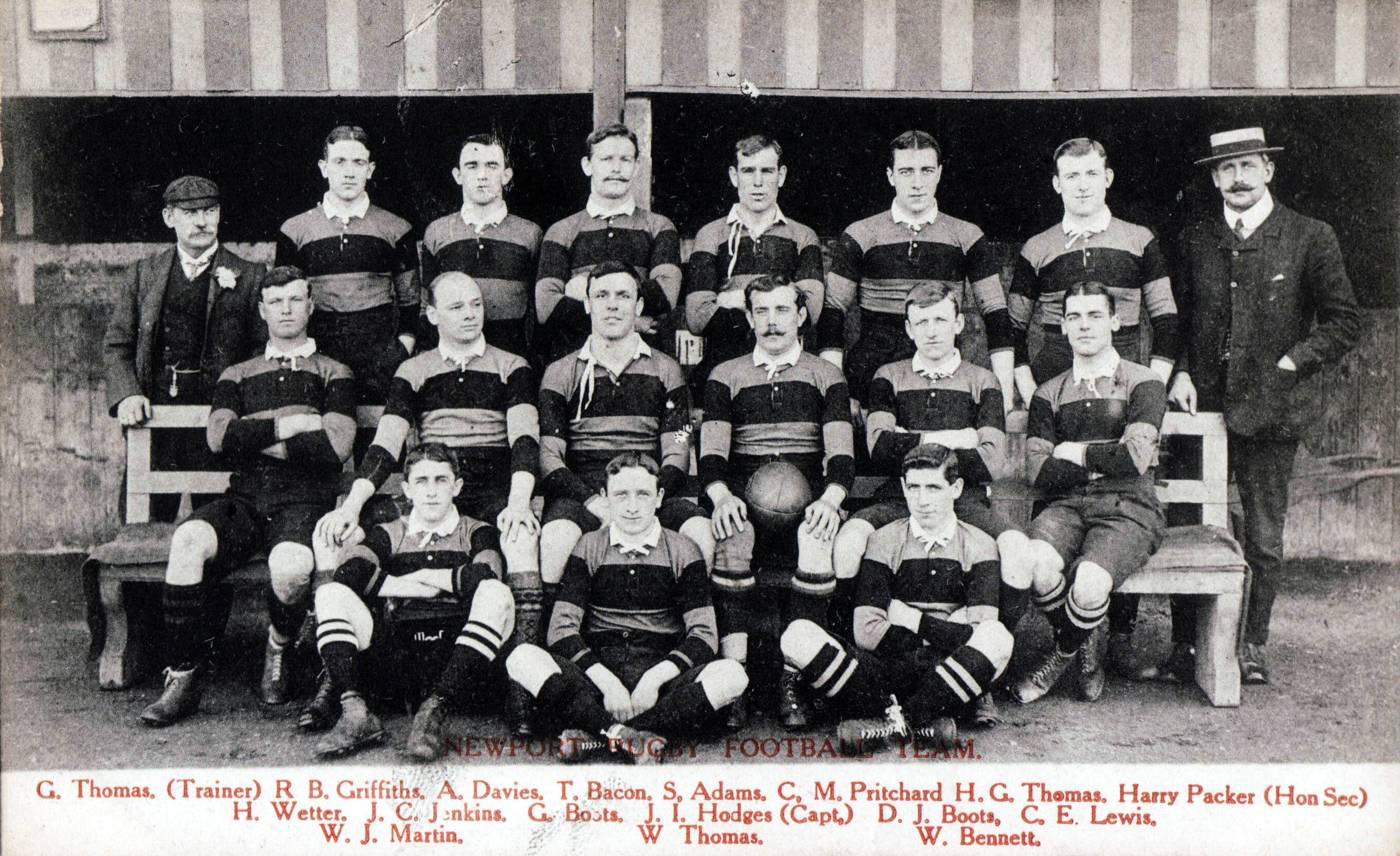
The 1904–05 team

Newport RFC were formed in 1874 under the financial backing of the Phillips brewing family, and the playing talents of former pupils of Monmouth School, a public school which had adopted rugby union in 1873. Newport was originally intended as an association football club, but was unable to find any opponents, but they managed to organise a rugby match against Cardiff RFC, and in 1875 played Cardiff in both clubs' first-ever game.

Newport's early success was remarkable, winning every match in their first four seasons between 1875 and 1879. They were also successful in other tournaments winning the first two South Wales Cup competitions. The club's strength was reflected at international level, providing more players to the Welsh national team than any other club in the 19th century, including four captains. In 1881, Newport was one of the 11 clubs present at the forming of the Welsh Rugby Football Union, and provided six players in the first international match played by the Wales national team, more than any other club.

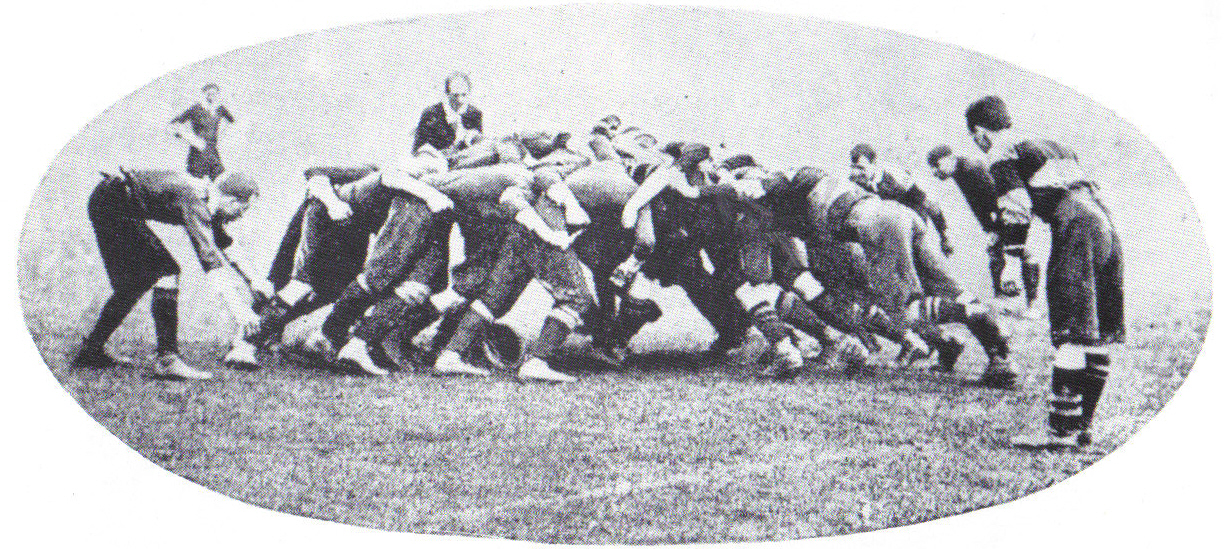
Scrum between Newport and London Welsh, 31 December 1904

Partially due to their geographical location Newport also played against more established clubs from England and in 1878 a game was arranged against Manchester Athletic followed by games against Birmingham, Clifton, Gloucester and Swindon. Their dominance led Newport's club secretary, Richard Mulloch to arrange a match against the English domestic champions Blackheath Rugby Club. With a record attendance of 5,000 spectators Newport were out-classed by their opponents, losing four goals and eight tries to nil. However, Newport had played two games in the previous five days and Blackheath brought in outside players to bolster their squad.

In October 1879 Newport played Cardiff RFC in a floodlit game at Rodney Parade; the first ground to have floodlights installed in Wales.

In 1887, Newport player Charlie Newman was given the captaincy of the Welsh national team, he was the first Newport player to achieve this honour. In 1887, Newport player Tom Clapp was given the Wales captaincy and in 1888, he led the first Welsh side to beat Scotland, a team that included Newport players Powell and Gould. During the 1891–92 season, under captain Tom Graham Newport went unbeaten, winning 29 games and drawing four. Graham brought a new professional attitude to the team, introducing weekly gym training and an avoidance of alcohol.

In 1912, Newport hosted the touring South Africa national team, and beat them 9–3.

=== 1919–1939 ===
- Invincible in 1922–23
- Welsh Club Champions 1920,1923.
- Provided 5 Welsh, 1 English and 1 Irish captains.
- Provided 6 British Lions.
- Golden era of Wetter, Uzzell, Griffiths, Morley, Bunner Travers etc.

=== 1945–2003 ===
- Golden era of Jones, Burnett, Thomas, Meredith, Price, Watkins, Jarrett etc.
- Beat Australia 1957, NZ 1963, SA 1969, Tonga 1974.
- Welsh Club Champions 1951, 1956, 1962, 1969.
- Won Welsh Merit Table and Anglo-Welsh Merit Table.
- Provided 7 Welsh, 1 Czech Rep, 2 Canadian, 1 Fijian captains.
- Provided 15 British Lions.
- Introduced 7s to Wales and won Snellings 10 times and R/U 9 times.
- One of pioneers of floodlights in Wales.
- Introduced squad systems / players playing on rota in Wales.
- Won Welsh Cup twice, R/U 3 times.
- Welsh Premier League winners and R/U – twice.

In 1963 Newport, captained by Brian Price, claimed perhaps their greatest victory by defeating New Zealand led by Wilson Whineray 3–0. This turned out to be the All Blacks' only defeat on their 1963 tour. The club was granted Freedom of the City of Newport on the 50th anniversary of this victory.

After rugby turned professional in 1995, Newport initially struggled, being relegated after finishing bottom of the eight-team Welsh Premier Division in 1998, only to be reinstated after Cardiff and Swansea 1998–99 Welsh rugby union rebel season over a dispute with the WRU. After staying up, Newport then moved to full-time professionalism for the 1999–2000 season with the help of benefactor Tony Brown, who financed marquee signings including former South Africa captain Gary Teichmann. The first game of the season against Cardiff drew a crowd of almost 7,000, the biggest since the visit of the All Blacks in 1989. This was accompanied by a rise in season ticket sales from 700 the previous season to 3,300, with a further increase to 4,000 expected the following year.

In 2003, Newport merged with Ebbw Vale to form the Gwent Dragons side (soon renamed Newport Gwent Dragons) as part of the Introduction of regional rugby union teams in Wales. Newport RFC continued to compete as an amateur side, later semi-professional, in the Welsh club league.

=== 2003–Present ===
Newport finished the 2021–22 Indigo Group Premiership in second place, having sat the top of table of most of the season. They did, however, win the Premiership Cup with a 25–21 victory over Aberavon at the Millennium Stadium.

== Club honours ==
- Unofficial Welsh Club Champions: 1895, 1896, 1903, 1912, 1920, 1923, 1951, 1956, 1962, 1969
- South Wales Cup: 1878, 1879, 1882, 1883, 1884, 1890
- Snelling Sevens: 1954, 1956, 1957, 1959, 1961, 1962, 1963, 1965, 1967, 1985
- Welsh Cup: 1977, 2001, 2022
- Welsh Division One Winners: 1990–91
- Welsh Premier Division: 2004
- Super Rygbi Cymru: 2025
- Super Rygbi Cymru Cup: 2026

== British and Irish Lions ==
The following former players were selected for the British and Irish Lions touring squads whilst playing for Newport RFC. Newport hold the record for the number of players from one club selected for a British Lions Tour with eight Newport players being selected for the 1910 British Lions tour to South Africa.

- (Wales) Mel Baker 1910
- (Wales) David Burcher 1977
- (Wales) Glyn Davidge 1962
- (Wales) Harold Davies 1924
- (Wales) Bob Evans 1950
- (Wales) Gareth Evans 1977
- (Wales) Rowland Griffiths 1908
- (Wales) Vince Griffiths 1924
- (Wales) Harry Jarman 1910
- (Wales) Keith Jarrett 1968
- (Wales) Jack Jones 1910
- (Wales) Ken Jones 1950
- (Wales) Allan Lewis 1966
- (Wales) Willie Llewellyn 1904
- (Scotland) Neil McPherson 1924
- (Wales) Bryn Meredith 1955,1959,1962
- (Wales) Jack Morley 1930
- (Wales) Reg Plummer 1910
- (Wales) Brian Price 1966
- (Ireland) William Roche 1924
- (Wales) Reg Skrimshire 1903
- (Ireland) Tommy Smyth 1910
- (Wales) Jeff Squire 1977
- (Wales) Malcolm Thomas 1950,1959
- (Wales) William 'Bunner' Travers 1938
- (Wales) Tommy Vile 1904
- (Wales) Phil Waller 1910
- (Wales) David Watkins 1966
- (Wales) Stuart Watkins 1966
- (England) Stanley Williams 1910

== Wales international captains ==
The following former players captained the Wales national rugby union team whilst playing for Newport RFC.

- Charlie Newman 1884–87
- Bob Gould 1887
- Tom Clapp 1887–88
- Arthur "Monkey" Gould 1889–97
- Tom Pearson 1903
- Llewellyn Lloyd 1903
- Willie Llewellyn 1904–05
- Tommy Vile 1912–21
- Harry Uzzell 1920
- Jack Wetter 1921–24
- Jack Whitfield 1924
- John Evans 1934
- Ken Jones 1954
- Malcolm Thomas 1957
- Bryn Meredith 1960–62
- David Watkins 1967
- Brian Price 1969
- Mike Watkins 1984

== Other notable former players ==
- (Wales) Robert Ackerman
- (England) Stuart Barnes
- (Wales) James Bevan
- (Wales) Arthur Boucher
- (Wales) Onllwyn Brace
- (Wales) Roy Burnett
- (Wales) Archie Brown
- (Wales) Percy Coldrick
- (Wales) Laurie Daniel
- (Wales) Jason Forster
- (Wales) Trevor Foster
- (South Africa) (Zimbabwe) Adrian Garvey
- (Wales) Bert Gould
- (Wales) Tom Graham
- (Wales) James Hannan
- (Wales) Jehoida Hodges
- (New Zealand) (Wales) Shane Howarth
- (Wales) John Jeffery
- (Wales) Brian Jones
- (Wales) Steve Jones
- (Wales) Dai Llewellyn
- (Wales) Horace Lyne
- (Wales) Walter Martin
- (South Africa) Percy Montgomery
- (Wales) Harry Packer
- (South Africa) JEC 'Birdie' Partridge
- (Wales) Tom Pook
- (Wales) Charlie Pritchard
- (Fiji) Simon Raiwalui
- (Wales) Dai Rees
- (Canada) Gareth Rees
- (England) Colin Smart
- (Canada) Rod Snow
- (South Africa) Gary Teichmann
- (Samoa) (New Zealand) Ofisa Tonu'u
- (Wales) George Travers
- (Wales) Paul Turner
- (Wales) Wallace Watts

== Current squad ==
Newport RFC Squad 2022/23

Newport RFC squad
Props: (Wales) Tom Davies; (Wales) Nathan Evans; (Wales) Garin Harris; (Wales) Joe Popple; (Wales) Craig Price; (Wales) Dan Suter; (Wales) Tom Workman; Hookers: (Wales) Harry Bee; (Wales) Jack Gillard; (Wales) Williams Griffiths; (Wales) Henry Palmer; Locks: (Wales) Joe Bartlett; (Wales) Elliot Ferriman; (Wales) Dan Hill; (Wales) Craig Hudd; (Wales) Ryan Woodman	Back row: (Wales) Alex Gray; (Wales) Rhys Jenkins; (Wales) Ben Moa; (Wales) Josh Reid; (Wales) Ben Roach; (Wales) Joshua Skinner; (Wales) Kyle Tayler; (Wales) George Young; Scrum-halves: (Wales) Dafydd Buckland; (Wales) Luke Crane; (Wales) Che Hope; (Wales) Geraint Watkin; Fly-halves: (Wales) Keiron Meek; (Wales) Matt O'Brien (c); (Wales) Will Reed	Centres: (Wales) Harri Ackerman; (Wales) Oli Andrew; (Wales) Jack Brooks; (Wales) Chay Foster-Smith; (Wales) Cameron Lewis; (Wales) Tom Richards; (Wales) Dafydd Smith; Wings: (Wales) Elliot Frewen; (Wales) Lloyd Lewis; (Wales) Jonathan Morris; (Wales) Cole Swannack; Fullbacks: (Wales) Geraint O'Driscoll; (Wales) David Richards
(c) denotes the team captain.

== Games played against international opposition ==
Year	Date	Opponent	Result	Score	Tour
1888	26 December	Māori	Loss	0–3	1888 New Zealand Māori tour
1905	23 December	New Zealand	Loss	3–6	1905 Original All Blacks tour
1906	27 October	(United Kingdom) South Africa	Loss	0–8	1906 South Africa rugby union tour
1908	19 December	Australia	Loss	3–5	1908–09 Australia rugby union tour of Britain
1912	24 October	South Africa	Win	9–3	1912–13 South Africa rugby union tour
1924	2 October	New Zealand	Loss	10–13	1924–25 New Zealand tour of Britain, Ireland, France and Canada
1927	22 September	(Australia) New South Wales Waratahs	Loss	3–20	1927–28 Waratahs tour of the British Isles, France and Canada
1931	8 October	South Africa	Loss	3–15	1931–32 South Africa rugby union tour
1935	31 October	New Zealand	Loss	5–17	1935–36 New Zealand rugby union tour of Britain, Ireland and Canada
1947	23 October	Australia	Loss	4–8	1947–48 Australia rugby union tour
1952	12 January	South Africa	Loss	6–12	1951–52 South Africa rugby union tour
1954	21 January	New Zealand	Loss	6–11	1953–54 All Blacks tour of the British Isles, France and North America
1957	23 November	Australia	Win	11–0	
1963	30 October	New Zealand	Win	3–0	1963–64 New Zealand rugby union tour of Britain, Ireland, France and North America
1966	23 November	Australia	Draw	3–3	1966 Australia Tour of Britain and France
1969	12 November	South Africa	Won	11–6	1969 South Africa Tour of UK
1973	10 January	New Zealand	Loss	15–20	1972–73 New Zealand rugby union tour of the British Isles
1974	9 October	Tonga	Win	14–6	1974 Tonga Tour of the British Isles
1976	7 January	Australia	Loss	7–13	1975–76 Australia rugby union tour of Britain and Ireland
1980	28 October	New Zealand	Loss	3–14	1980 All Blacks tour
1985	30 October	Fiji	Loss	6–7	1985 Fiji tour of the British Isles
1989	31 October	New Zealand	Loss	9–54	1989 New Zealand rugby union tour of the British Isles and Canada
2001	18 November	Uruguay	Win	59–5	2001 Uruguay rugby union tour of Wales

== See also ==
- Newport Gwent Dragons
- Newport Saracens RFC
- Newport HSOB RFC
- Pill Harriers RFC
- Bettws RFC

== Bibliography ==
- Smith, David; Williams, Gareth (1980). Fields of Praise: The Official History of The Welsh Rugby Union. Cardiff: University of Wales Press. ISBN 0-7083-0766-3.
