= List of Wales national rugby union team captains =

In a rugby union match, each team nominates one of the members of their starting line-up to serve as captain, giving them the responsibility of leading their team and communicating with the referee. Since 1881, the Wales national team has played 722 matches and named 137 captains. Sam Warburton led Wales in the most matches, captaining them 49 times between 2011 and 2016; Warburton also captained Wales to their most victories with 23. The Wales captain to have maintained a 100% record while playing in the most matches is Bleddyn Williams (5) between 1953 and 1955, although Tom Parker captained the side to six wins and a draw between 1921 and 1923. Wales' longest serving captain (albeit not a continuous spell) is Alun Wyn Jones, who first captained the team in 2009. The most recent addition to the list is Jonathan Davies, who led the team against Italy on 9 February 2019 during the Six Nations.

- Information correct as of 14 March 2019.

| # | Player | Club team | Record as captain | Years as captain |
|---|---|---|---|---|
| 1 | James Bevan | Cambridge University R.U.F.C. | P1, L1 | 1881 |
| 2 | Charles P. Lewis | Llandovery College | P3, W1, L2 | 1882–83 |
| 3 | Charles H. Newman | Newport RFC | P6, D2, L4 | 1884–87 |
| 4 | H. Joe Simpson | Cardiff RFC | P1, W1 | 1884 |
| 5 | Frank E. Hancock | Cardiff RFC | P1, L1 | 1886 |
| 6 | Bob Gould | Newport RFC | P1, L1 | 1887 |
| 7 | Tom Clapp | Newport RFC | P3, W2, L1 | 1887–88 |
| 8 | Arthur Frank Hill | Cardiff RFC | P4, W1, L3 | 1889–94 |
| 9 | Arthur J. 'Monkey' Gould | Newport RFC | P18, W8, D1, L9 | 1889–97 |
| 10 | William H. Bowen | Swansea RFC | P1, L1 | 1891 |
| 11 | Williams H. Thomas (Willie) | Llanelli RFC | P2, W1, D1 | 1891 |
| 12 | Williams J. Bancroft (Billy) | Swansea RFC | P11, W7, D4 | 1898–1901 |
| 13 | E. Gwyn Nicholls | Cardiff RFC | P10, W7, D1, L2 | 1902–06 |
| 14 | Tom W. Pearson | Newport RFC | P1, W1 | 1903 |
| 15 | G. Llewellyn Lloyd | Newport RFC | P1, L1 | 1903 |
| 16 | William M. Llewellyn (Willie) | Newport RFC | P5, W4, L1 | 1904–05 |
| 17 | Richard M. Owen (Dickie) | Swansea RFC | P3, W2, L1 | 1907–12 |
| 18 | Williams J. Trew (Billy) | Swansea RFC | P14, W12, L2 | 1907–13 |
| 19 | Rhys T. Gabe | Cardiff RFC | P1, W1 | 1907 |
| 20 | Arthur F. 'Boxer' Harding | London Welsh | P1, W1 | 1908 |
| 21 | George Travers | Pill Harriers RFC | P1, W1 | 1908 |
| 22 | Edward Morgan (Teddy) | London Welsh RFC | P1, W1 | 1908 |
| 23 | H. Bert Winfield | Cardiff RFC | P1, W1 | 1908 |
| 24 | Reggie A. Gibbs | Cardiff RFC | P1, W1 | 1910 |
| 25 | Johnnie L. Williams | Cardiff RFC | P1, W1 | 1911 |
| 26 | Jack Bancroft | Swansea RFC | P1, L1 | 1912 |
| 27 | Tom H. Vile (Tommy) | Newport RFC | P4, W1, L3 | 1912–21 |
| 28 | John P. Jones (Jack) | Pontypool RFC | P1, W1 | 1913 |
| 29 | Reverend J. Alban Davies | Llanelli RFC | P4, W3, L1 | 1914 |
| 30 | Glyn Stephens | Neath RFC | P1, L1 | 1919 |
| 31 | Harry Uzzell | Newport RFC | P4, W3, L1 | 1920 |
| 32 | Jack J. Wetter | Newport RFC | P3, L3 | 1921–24 |
| 33 | Tom Parker | Swansea RFC | P7, W6, D1 | 1921–23 |
| 34 | J. M. Clem Lewis | Cardiff RFC | P2, L2 | 1923 |
| 35 | Albert Jenkins | Llanelli RFC | P2, L2 | 1923–28 |
| 36 | Joe Rees | Swansea RFC | P1, L1 | 1924 |
| 37 | Jack Whitfield | Newport RFC | P1, L1 | 1924 |
| 38 | W. Rowe Harding | Swansea RFC | P4, W2, D1, L1 | 1924–28 |
| 39 | Tom Johnson | Cardiff RFC | P1, L1 | 1925 |
| 40 | Steve Morris | Cross Keys RFC | P1, L1 | 1925 |
| 41 | R. Arthur Cornish | Cardiff RFC | P2, W1, L1 | 1925–26 |
| 42 | W. Idris Jones | Llanelli RFC | P1, L1 | 1925 |
| 43 | Williams J. Delahay (Bobby) | Cardiff RFC | P1, W1 | 1926 |
| 44 | B. R. Turnbull (Lou) | Cardiff RFC | P1, L1 | 1927 |
| 45 | B. Ossie Male | Cardiff RFC | P3, W1, L2 | 1927–28 |
| 46 | Wick C. Powell | London Welsh RFC | P2, W1, L1 | 1927 |
| 47 | Ivor E. Jones | Llanelli RFC | P3, L3 | 1927–30 |
| 48 | W. Guy Morgan | Swansea RFC | P4, W3, D1 | 1929–30 |
| 49 | Harry M. Bowcott | Cardiff RFC | P1, L1 | 1930 |
| 50 | Jack Bassett | Penarth RFC | P9, W6, D1, L2 | 1930–32 |
| 51 | Watcyn G. Thomas | Swansea RFC | P3, W1, L2 | 1933 |
| 52 | John R. Evans | Newport RFC | P1, L1 | 1934 |
| 53 | E. Claude Davey | Swansea RFC | P8, W5, D1, L2 | 1934–37 |
| 54 | J. Idwal Rees | Swansea RFC | P3, W1, D1, L1 | 1936–37 |
| 55 | Wilf Wooller | Cardiff RFC | P4, W2, L2 | 1937–39 |
| 56 | Cliff W. Jones | Cardiff RFC | P3, W2, L1 | 1938 |
| 57 | Haydn Tanner | Cardiff RFC | P12, W5, D1, L6 | 1947–49 |
| 58 | William E. Tamplin (Billy) | Cardiff RFC | P1, W1 | 1947 |
| 59 | John A. Gwilliam | Edinburgh Wanderers | P13, W9, D1, L3 | 1950–53 |
| 60 | Jack Matthews | Cardiff RFC | P1, L1 | 1951 |
| 61 | Bleddyn L. Williams | Cardiff RFC | P5, W5 | 1953–55 |
| 62 | J.R.G. Stephens (Rees) | Neath RFC | P6, W5, L1 | 1954–57 |
| 63 | W. Rex Willis | Cardiff RFC | P2, W1, L1 | 1954–55 |
| 64 | Ken J. Jones | Newport RFC | P1, W1 | 1954 |
| 65 | Cliff I. Morgan | Cardiff RFC | P4, W3, L1 | 1956 |
| 66 | Malcolm C. Thomas | Newport RFC | P2, L2 | 1957 |
| 67 | R.C.C. Thomas (Clem) | Swansea RFC | P9, W5, D1, L3 | 1958–59 |
| 68 | R. H. Williams | Llanelli RFC | P1, L1 | 1960 |
| 69 | Bryn V. Meredith | Newport RFC | P4, W2, D1, L1 | 1960–62 |
| 70 | D. Onllwyn Brace | Llanelli RFC | P2, W2 | 1960–61 |
| 71 | Terry J. Davies | Llanelli RFC | P3, W1, L2 | 1960–61 |
| 72 | Lloyd H. Williams | Cardiff RFC | P3, D1, L2 | 1961–62 |
| 73 | D.C.T. Rowlands (Clive) | Pontypool RFC | P14, W6, D2, L6 | 1963–65 |
| 74 | Alun E.I. Pask | Abertillery RFC | P6, W3, L3 | 1966–67 |
| 75 | David Watkins | Newport RFC | P3, W1, L2 | 1967 |
| 76 | Norman R. Gale | Llanelli RFC | P2, D1, L1 | 1967–68 |
| 77 | Gareth O. Edwards | Cardiff RFC | P13, W6, D3, L4 | 1968–74 |
| 78 | S. John Dawes | London Welsh RFC | P6, W5, L1 | 1968–71 |
| 79 | Brian Price | Newport RFC | P6, W3, D1, L2 | 1969 |
| 80 | D. John Lloyd | Bridgend RFC | P3, W3 | 1972 |
| 81 | W. Delme Thomas | Llanelli RFC | P1, L1 | 1972 |
| 82 | Arthur J. L. Lewis | Ebbw Vale RFC | P3, W2, L1 | 1973 |
| 83 | T. Mervyn Davies | Swansea RFC | P9, W8, L1 | 1975–76 |
| 84 | Phil Bennett | Llanelli RFC | P8, W7, L1 | 1977–78 |
| 85 | Terry J. Cobner | Pontypool RFC | P1, L1 | 1978 |
| 86 | T. G. R. Davies (Gerald) | Cardiff RFC | P1, L1 | 1978 |
| 87 | John P. R. Williams (J. P. R.) | Bridgend RFC | P5, W3, L2 | 1978–79 |
| 88 | Jeff Squire | Pontypool RFC | P6, W3, L3 | 1980–81 |
| 89 | Steve P. Fenwick | Bridgend RFC | P3, W1, L2 | 1980–81 |
| 90 | W. Gareth Davies | Cardiff RFC | P5, W2, L3 | 1981–82 |
| 91 | Eddie T. Butler | Pontypool RFC | P6, W2, D1, L3 | 1983–84 |
| 92 | Mike J. Watkins | Newport RFC | P4, W2, L2 | 1984 |
| 93 | Terry D. Holmes | Cardiff RFC | P5, W3, L2 | 1985 |
| 94 | David F. Pickering | Llanelli RFC | P8, W4, L4 | 1986–87 |
| 95 | Richard D. Moriarty | Swansea RFC | P7, W6, L1 | 1986–87 |
| 96 | W. (Billy) James | Aberavon RFC | P1, L1 | 1987 |
| 97 | Jonathan Davies | Llanelli RFC | P4, W2, L2 | 1987–88 |
| 98 | Bleddyn Bowen | South Wales Police RFC | P5, W4, L1 | 1987–88 |
| 99 | Robert Norster | Cardiff RFC | P1, L1 | 1988 |
| 100 | Paul H. Thorburn | Neath RFC | P10, W1, D1, L8 | 1989–91 |
| 101 | Robert N. Jones | Swansea RFC | P5, L5 | 1989–90 |
| 102 | Kevin H. Phillips | Neath RFC | P2, W2 | 1990 |
| 103 | Ieuan C. Evans | Llanelli RFC | P28, W13, L15 | 1991–95 |
| 104 | Gareth O. Llewellyn | Neath RFC | P7, W5, L2 | 1993–95 |
| 105 | Mike R. Hall | Cardiff RFC | P3, W1, L2 | 1995 |
| 106 | Jonathan M. Humphreys | Cardiff RFC | P19, W6, L13 | 1995–2003 |
| 107 | Nigel G. Davies | Llanelli RFC | P1, L1 | 1996 |
| 108 | I. Scott Gibbs | Swansea RFC | P1, W1 | 1997 |
| 109 | R. Gwyn Jones | Cardiff RFC | P5, W4, L1 | 1997 |
| 110 | Paul John | Pontypridd RFC | P1, W1 | 1997 |
| 111 | Robert Howley | Cardiff RFC | P22, W15, L7 | 1998–99 |
| 112 | Kingsley Jones | Ebbw Vale RFC | P1, L1 | 1998 |
| 113 | David Young (Dai) | Cardiff RFC | P12, W6, D1, L5 | 2000–01 |
| 114 | Mark Taylor | Swansea RFC, Sale Sharks | P4, W4 | 2000–05 |
| 115 | L. Scott Quinnell | Llanelli RFC | P7, W2, L5 | 2000–02 |
| 116 | Andy P. Moore | Swansea RFC | P2, W2 | 2001 |
| 117 | Colin L. Charvis | Swansea RFC, Newcastle Falcons | P22, W11, L11 | 2002–04 |
| 118 | Martyn E. Williams | Cardiff RFC, Cardiff Blues | P6, W1, L5 | 2003–09 |
| 119 | Gareth Thomas | Celtic Warriors, Toulouse, Cardiff Blues | P21, W9, L12 | 2003–07 |
| 120 | Stephen M. Jones | Llanelli RFC, Scarlets | P8 W1 D1 L6 | 2003–07 |
| 121 | D. Mefin Davies | Celtic Warriors | P1, W1 | 2003 |
| 122 | Michael Owen | Newport Gwent Dragons | P6, W3, D1, L2 | 2005–06 |
| 123 | Duncan Jones | Ospreys | P3, W1, L2 | 2006 |
| 124 | Dwayne J. Peel | Llanelli Scarlets | P1, W1 | 2007 |
| 125 | Gethin Jenkins | Cardiff Blues, Toulon | P5, W2, L3 | 2007, 2009, 2011, 2012, 2013 |
| 126 | Ryan P. Jones | Ospreys | P33, W19, L13, D1 | 2008–10, 2012–13 |
| 127 | Alun Wyn Jones | Ospreys | P23, W14, L9 | 2009, 2014, 2017–2023 |
| 128 | Matthew Rees | Scarlets, Cardiff Blues | P9, W4, L5 | 2010, 2012 |
| 129 | Sam Warburton | Cardiff Blues | P49, W23, L25, D1 | 2011–2016 |
| 130 | Bradley Davies | Cardiff Blues | P2, W1, L1 | 2013 |
| 131 | Scott Williams | Scarlets | P1, L1 | 2015 |
| 132 | Dan Lydiate | Ospreys | P3, W2, L1 | 2016–2017 |
| 133 | Jamie Roberts | Harlequins | P2, W2 | 2017 |
| 134 | Taulupe Faletau | Bath | P1, W1 | 2018 |
| 135 | Ellis Jenkins | Cardiff Blues | P3, W3 | 2018, 2021 |
| 136 | Cory Hill | Dragons | P2, W2 | 2018 |
| 137 | Jonathan Davies | Scarlets | P5, W2, D1, L2 | 2019, 2020, 2021 |
| 138 | Josh Navidi | Cardiff Blues | P1, L1 | 2019 |
| 139 | Justin Tipuric | Ospreys | P6, W3, L3 | 2019, 2020, 2022 |
| 140 | Dan Biggar | Northampton Saints | P5, W1, L4 | 2022 |
| 141 | Ken Owens | Scarlets | P2, L2 | 2023 |
| 142 | Jac Morgan | Ospreys | P5, L1 | 2023, 2025 |
| 143 | Dewi Lake | Ospreys | P4, L2 | 2023, 2024 |
| 144 | Dafydd Jenkins | Exeter Chiefs | P1, L1 | 2023, 2024 |
