= Dai Hiddlestone =

Wales international rugby union player (1890–1973)

- Born: David Daniel Hiddlestone; 14 June 1890 Hendy, Wales
- Died: 16 November 1973 (aged 83)
- Height: 5 ft 8 in (1.73 m)
- Notable relative(s): Terry Price, grandson

Rugby union career
- Position: Flanker
Amateur team(s)
Years	Team	Apps	(Points)
- Hendy RFC
?-1919	Llanelli RFC		
1919-	Neath RFC		
International career
Years	Team	Apps	(Points)
1924–1925	Wales	5	(3)

David 'Dai' Hiddlestone (14 June 1890 – 16 November 1973) was a Welsh international rugby union player who played club rugby for Neath. He was capped five times for Wales and was notable for leading an ill-advised response to the New Zealand Haka during the team's 1924 tour.

== Rugby career ==
Hiddlestone was born in Hendy, Carmarthenshire, where he played his early rugby with local club, Hendy RFC. After the end of World War I he joined Llanelli a first class team within Welsh club rugby. He left Llanelli under poor circumstances, some sources stating that Hiddlestone was considered "too dirty" for the club, though at the time of leaving the club he was the present team captain, a position elected by the club members. Whatever the reason for his leaving Llanelli, Hiddlestone was accepted to play for Neath. In 1922 he was first selected to represent Wales as part of the Home Nations Championship in a game against England. The Welsh team he joined had many new caps, including Swansea's Islwyn Evans and Frank Palmer, Bridgend's Bobby Delahay and William Cummins from Treorchy. Led by Tom Parker, Wales overran the English team, scoring a record eight tries against England; Hiddlestone himself not only scored one of the tries, but is also credited as being the central linchpin in the Welsh attack that won the game so comfortably.

Hiddlestone played in all three of the remaining matches of the 1922 tournament, which saw Wales win the championship. The team beat Ireland and France, and it was only a draw with Scotland that prevented the team taking the Grand Slam title. Hiddlestone was replaced in the 1923 Championship by Gwilym Michael, but at the end of the 1924 season he was reselected for the Welsh team to face the touring New Zealanders. Although not selected as captain of the Welsh team, Hiddlestone decided to lead the team in a response to the All Black's Haka, similar to Teddy Morgan leading the national anthem in 1905. Hiddlestone chose to lead the Welsh team in a responsive "War-dance", which was seen as offensive and mocking towards the New Zealand team. During the game the Wales captain, Jack Wetter, took a heavy blow from George Nēpia and was forced to play the end of the game, out of position, in the pack. Hiddlestone was pushed out as an extra-back to cover his captain. New Zealand outclassed the Welsh team, winning 19–0, and Hiddlestone never represented Wales again.

Although out of favour with Wales, Hiddlestone was given the captaincy of Neath over the 1924/25 season. After his retirement from playing rugby, Hiddlestone became a rugby referee and officiated the joint Aberavon / Neath team when they faced the 1935 New Zealand tourists.

=== International matches played ===
Wales

- England 1922
- France 1922
- Ireland 1922
- Scotland 1922
- New Zealand 1924

== Bibliography ==
- Billot, John (1972). All Blacks in Wales. Ferndale: Ron Jones Publications.
- Godwin, Terry (1984). The International Rugby Championship 1883-1983. London: Willows Books. ISBN 0-00-218060-X.
- Griffiths, John (1987). The Phoenix Book of International Rugby Records. London: Phoenix House. ISBN 0-460-07003-7.
- Smith, David; Williams, Gareth (1980). Fields of Praise: The Official History of The Welsh Rugby Union. Cardiff: University of Wales Press. ISBN 0-7083-0766-3.

Rugby Union Captain
Preceded by Dick Edmunds	Llanelli RFC captain 1918–1919	Succeeded by Albert Jenkins
Preceded by	Neath RFC captain 1924–1925	Succeeded by
