= 1922 Five Nations Championship =

Rugby union competition

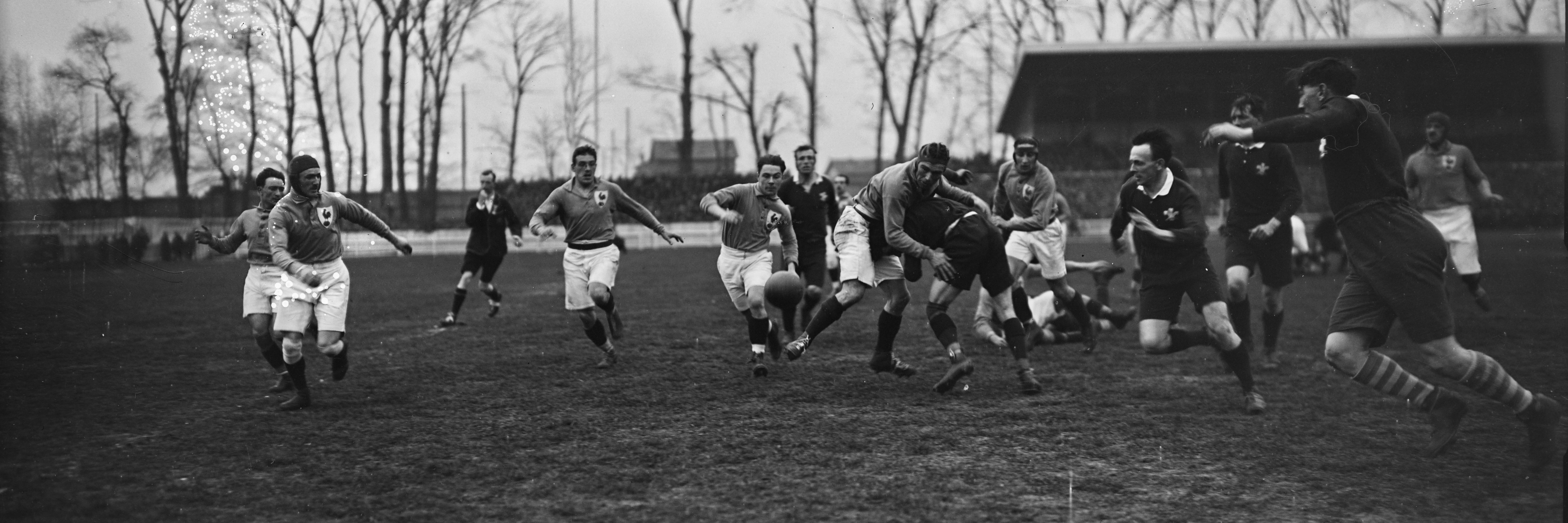
- France (in light colours) playing Wales (in dark colours) at Stade Colombes, Paris.
- Date: 2 January – 8 April 1922
- Countries: England; France; Ireland; Scotland; Wales

Tournament statistics
- Champions: Wales (8th title)
- Matches played: 10

The 1922 Five Nations Championship was the eighth series of the rugby union Five Nations Championship following the inclusion of France into the Home Nations Championship. Including the previous Home Nations Championships, this was the thirty-fifth series of the annual northern hemisphere rugby union championship. Ten matches were played between 2 January and 8 April. It was contested by England, France, Ireland, Scotland and Wales.

== Table ==
Pos	Team	Pld	W	D	L	PF	PA	PD	Pts
1	Wales	4	3	1	0	59	23	+36	7
2	England	4	2	1	1	40	47	−7	5
3	Scotland	4	1	2	1	23	26	−3	4
4	Ireland	4	1	0	3	19	32	−13	2
4	France	4	0	2	2	20	33	−13	2

== Results ==
2 January 1922

France	3–3	Scotland
Try: Jauréguy		Try: Browning

Stade Colombes, Paris
Referee: HC Harrison (England)

21 January 1922

Wales	28–6	England
Try: Bowen; Delahay; Evans; Hiddlestone; Parker; Palmer; Richards; Whitfield; Con: Rees (2)		Try: Day; Lowe

Cardiff Arms Park, Cardiff
Referee: JM Tennant (Scotland)

Wales: Joe Rees (Swansea), Cliff Richards (Pontypool), Brinley Evans (Llanelli), Islwyn Evans (Swansea), Frank Palmer (Swansea), Billy Bowen (Swansea), Bobby Delahay (Bridgend), Tom Parker (Swansea) (capt.), Jack Whitfield (Newport), Thomas Jones (Newport), Steve Morris (Cross Keys), Tom Roberts (Risca), John Stephens (Llanelli), Dai Hiddlestone (Neath), William Cummins (Treorchy)

England: BS Cumberlege (Blackheath), CN Lowe (Blackheath), EDG Hammett (Blackheath), E Myers (Bradford), HL Day (Leicester), VG Davies (Harlequins), CA Kershaw (US Portsmouth), R Edwards (Newport), ER Gardner (Devonport Services), JS Tucker (Bristol), Wavell Wakefield (Harlequins), AF Blakiston (Blackheath), AT Voyce (Gloucester), GS Conway (Cambridge U), LG Brown (Blackheath) (capt.)

4 February 1922

Scotland	9–9	Wales
Try: Browning (2); Pen: Browning		Try: Bowen; Con: Samuel; Drop: Evans

Inverleith, Edinburgh
Referee: RA Lloyd (Ireland)

11 February 1922

Ireland	3–12	England
Try: Wallis		Try: Lowe; Gardener; Maxwell-Hyslop; Smallwood

Lansdowne Road, Dublin
Referee: JM Tennant (Scotland)

25 February 1922

Scotland	6–3	Ireland
Try: Bryce; Liddell		Try: Clarke

Inverleith, Edinburgh
Referee: TD Schofield (Wales)

25 February 1922

England	11–11	France
Try: Voyce; Con: Day; Pen: Day		Try: Cassayet; Got; Lasserre; Con: Crabos

Twickenham, London
Referee: JM Tennant (Scotland)

11 March 1922

Wales	11–5	Ireland
Try: Whitfield (2); Evans; Con: Samuel		Try: Stoke; Con: Wallis

St Helen's, Swansea
Referee: John Sturrock (Scotland)

18 March 1922

England	11–5	Scotland
Try: Lowe (2); Davies; Con: Conway		Try: Dykes; Con: Bertram

Twickenham, London
Attendance: 40,000
Referee: RA Lloyd (Ireland)

23 March 1922

France	3–11	Wales
Try: Jauréguy		Try: Whitfield; Cummins; Evans

Stade Colombes, Paris
Referee: RW Harland (Ireland)

8 April 1922

Ireland	8–3	France
Try: Stephenson; Con: Wallis; Pen: Wallis		Try: Pascot

Lansdowne Road, Dublin
Referee: JM Tennant (Scotland)
