= Dai Parker =

British Lions & Wales international rugby union footballer

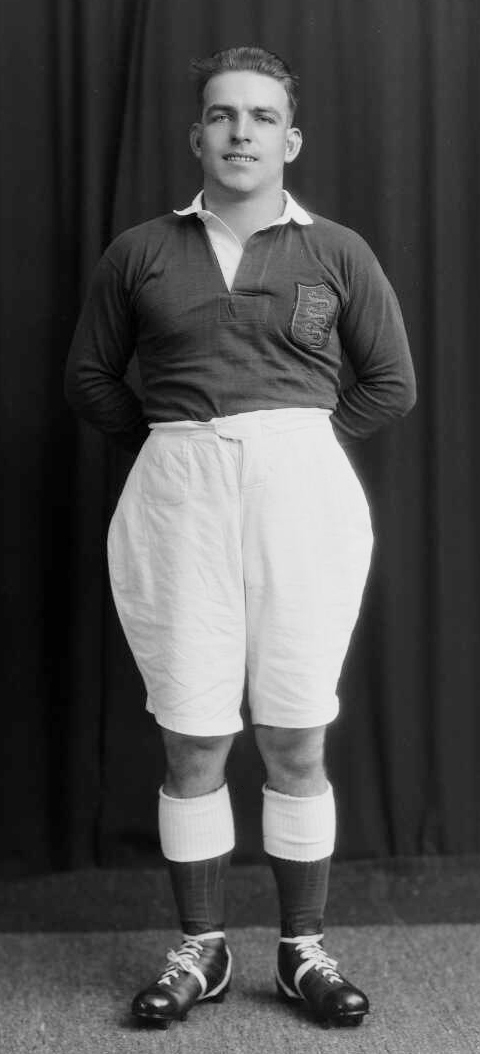
- Parker in New Zealand in 1930
- Born: 8 August 1904 Llansamlet, Wales
- Died: 16 June 1965 (aged 60) Swansea, Wales
- Notable relative(s): Tom Parker, brother

Rugby union career
- Position: Forward
Amateur team(s)
Years	Team	Apps	(Points)
- Llansamlet RFC
1923–?	Swansea RFC		
International career
Years	Team	Apps	(Points)
1924–1930	Wales	10	(11)
1930	British Lions	5	(3)

Dai Parker (8 August 1904 – 16 June 1965) was a Welsh international rugby union prop who played club rugby for Swansea. He won ten caps for Wales and was selected to play in the 1930 British Lions tour of New Zealand and Australia.

== Club career ==
Parker first played for Swansea in 1923, and in 1924 he was part of the Swansea team that played the 1924 touring New Zealand team. Swansea lost heavily, but when Parker scored with a penalty kick he was the first person to score against the tourists, even though the game was the fifth of the series.

Parker was Swansea's lead scorer over five consecutive seasons between 1925/26 and 1929/30. He was also chosen to captain Swansea in the 1927/28 season.

== International career ==
Parker was first chosen to represent Wales in a match against Ireland as part of the 1924 Five Nations Championship. The Welsh team saw ten changes from the prior game against Scotland, which Wales had lost 10–35 and Parker was one of six new caps, five of them in the pack. Played in front of the Prince of Wales at the Cardiff Arms Park, Wales lost narrowly. The selectors kept faith in Parker and he was chosen to play in the next game, away to France. Wales were victorious, halting a losing streak of four matches, thanks to a drop goal from Vincent Griffiths.

Parker was next selected for Wales to face the same touring New Zealand team he had lost to playing for Swansea in 1924. Under the captaincy of Jack Wetter, Wales were outclassed by the All Black's speed and combination play. Parker worked tirelessly in the pack along with Steve Morris and Charlie Pugh, but were let down by uninspiring back play. Teddy Morgan, writing in the Western Mail, commented that "The Welsh side hardly deserved a score, though the forwards surpassed themselves."

Parker played the entire 1925 Five Nations Championship, one of only three players in the pack to hold their position throughout the tournament, the others being Aberavon's Bryn Phillips and Llanelli's Idris Jones. Although Wales lost three of the four games, Parker scored in two of the games, a conversion in the win over France and a conversion and a penalty goal in a loss to Scotland.

Parker missed the next three Championships, but was reselected for the 1929 tournament. Parker was back on the score sheet converting one of the two tries in a victory over the French. In the final match of the Championship, Parker converted a try by Frank Williams to steal a draw with Ireland. Parker's final international cap was in the opening game of the 1930 campaign, a draw with England at the Arms Park.

In 1930, Parker was selected to join the British Lions in their tour of Australia and New Zealand. Parker played in all five tests of the tour, scoring a penalty goal in the fourth test against New Zealand in Wellington. On the tour he was often used as a hooker, playing in that position for all four New Zealand tests.

=== International matches played ===
Wales

- England 1925, 1930
- France 1924, 1925, 1929
- Ireland 1924, 1925, 1929
- New Zealand 1924
- Scotland 1925

British Lions

- Australia 1930
- New Zealand 1930, 1930, 1930, 1930

== Bibliography ==
- Billot, John (1972). All Blacks in Wales. Ferndale, Glamorgan: Ron Jones Publications.
- Godwin, Terry (1984). The International Rugby Championship 1883-1983. Grafton Street, London: Willow Books. ISBN 0-00-218060-X.
- Smith, David; Williams, Gareth (1980). Fields of Praise: The Official History of The Welsh Rugby Union. Cardiff: University of Wales Press. ISBN 0-7083-0766-3.
