= Charlie Pugh =

Welsh international rugby union player

- Born: Charles Henry Pugh; 7 March 1896 Pontypridd, Wales
- Died: 23 January 1951 (aged 54)
- School: Port Talbot County School
- Occupation: Police officer

Rugby union career
- Position: Lock
Amateur team(s)
| Years | Team | Apps | (Points) |
- Aberavon RFC
| – | Maesteg RFC | | |
| – | Neath RFC | | |
| – | Glamorgan Police RFC | | |
| – | Glamorgan County RFC | | |
International career
| Years | Team | Apps | (Points) |
| 1924–1925 | Wales | 7 | (3) |

Charles Henry Pugh (7 March 1896 – 23 January 1951) was a Welsh international rugby union player who played rugby for three notable Welsh clubs, Aberavon, Maesteg and Neath. He was capped seven times for Wales and was part of the Welsh team that faced the touring 1924 New Zealand team.

== Rugby career ==
Pugh was first selected to represent Wales in the opening match of the 1924 Five Nations Championship. Played at home at St Helen's, Wales faced England, who had finished the previous season as home nations Grand Slam winners. Under the captaincy of Joe Rees, Pugh was one of nine new Welsh caps in the team who would eventually lose 17-9 to England. Pugh was reselected for the next game of the tournament, away to Scotland, but this was an even worse result than the English game, with the Welsh team letting in eight tries. Six of the Wales team never played for the national team after this match, though the selectors kept faith in Pugh for the next match against Ireland. After Jack Whitfield's lone spell as captain in the Scotland game, the Welsh were now led by Rowe Harding, though the result remained the same. In a close game at the Cardiff Arms Park, Pugh scored his only international points when he scored one of two Welsh tries, though this was not enough to gain victory over the Irish team. In the final game of the tournament, Pugh found himself again selected, the only forward to have played in all four matches of the Championship.

Towards the end of 1924, Pugh was part of the Welsh squad who faced George Nēpia's touring New Zealand team. Wales were beaten in a one-sided affair, though Pugh worked tirelessly under the pack leadership of Steve Morris. Pugh played two more games for Wales, both in the 1925 Championship, against England and Scotland. Wales lost both matches, leaving Pugh with only a single victory in a seven match international career.

=== International matches played ===
Wales

- England 1924, 1925
- France 1924
- Ireland 1924
- Scotland 1924, 1925
- New Zealand 1924

== Bibliography ==
- Billot, John (1972). All Blacks in Wales. Ferndale: Ron Jones Publications.
- Godwin, Terry (1984). The International Rugby Championship 1883-1983. London: Willows Books. ISBN 0-00-218060-X.
- Griffiths, John (1987). The Phoenix Book of International Rugby Records. London: Phoenix House. ISBN 0-460-07003-7.
- Smith, David; Williams, Gareth (1980). Fields of Praise: The Official History of The Welsh Rugby Union. Cardiff: University of Wales Press. ISBN 0-7083-0766-3.
