= Thomas Jones (rugby union) =

Wales international rugby union footballer

- Born: Thomas Jones; 13 December 1885 Pontnewydd, Torfaen, Wales
- Died: 20 August 1933 (aged 47) Newport, Monmouthshire
- Occupation(s): Policeman publican

Rugby union career
- Position: Prop
Amateur team(s)
| Years | Team | Apps | (Points) |
- Pontnewydd RFC
- Blaenavon RFC
- Pill Harriers RFC
- Glamorgan Police
| 1919-1927 | Newport RFC | | |
International career
| Years | Team | Apps | (Points) |
| 1922–1924 | Wales | 6 | (3) |

Thomas Jones (13 December 1895 – 20 August 1933) was a Welsh international rugby union player who played club rugby union for Newport. Jones was capped six times for Wales and was part of the 1922 Five Nations Championship winning side.

== Rugby career ==
Jones played for several second tier Welsh clubs in earlier years, including his home town Pontnewydd and local teams Blaenavon and Pill Harriers, before joining Newport in 1919.

Jones was first selected for Wales in 1922 while representing Newport at club level. Evans first game was against England at the Cardiff Arms Park under the captaincy of Tom Parker. Wales scored a record eight tries against England and the selectors kept faith with Jones by giving him a place in the next game of the 1922 Five Nations Championship against Scotland. Wales drew with Scotland thanks to a late drop goal from Islwyn Evans. Jones played the last two games of the tournament, both resulting in Welsh victories giving Wales the Home Nation Championship.

Unlike many of the 1922 squad, Jones was reselected for future Welsh games when he was chosen for the 1924 Five Nations Championship. More surprising as Jones had been suspended in August 1922 by the Welsh Rugby Union for encouraging younger players to switch codes from rugby union to the professional rugby league game. This decision was later over-turned and Jones was allowed to play rugby union again. Jones played two more games for Wales, the first against England saw him record his first international points when he scored a try, though this was not enough to prevent an English victory, Wales losing 17-9. His final game for Wales was the disastrous game against Scotland which Wales lost 35-10, Jones being one of six players to never represent Wales again.

Jones faced two more international touring teams as part of the Newport squad. He played against the 1924 touring New Zealand team and the 1926 Maoris.

=== International matches played ===
Wales

- England 1922, 1924
- France 1922
- Ireland 1922
- Scotland 1922, 1924

== Bibliography ==
- Godwin, Terry (1984). The International Rugby Championship 1883-1983. London: Willows Books. ISBN 0-00-218060-X.
- Smith, David; Williams, Gareth (1980). Fields of Praise: The Official History of The Welsh Rugby Union. Cardiff: University of Wales Press. ISBN 0-7083-0766-3.
