= Harold Davies (rugby union) =

Welsh rugby player (1898–1976)

- Born: Harold Joseph Davies; 5 December 1898 Newport, Wales
- Died: 29 March 1976 (aged 77) Newport, Wales
- School: St Julians High School, Newport
- Occupation: butcher

Rugby union career
- Position: Centre
Amateur team(s)
Years	Team	Apps	(Points)
1920–27	Newport RFC		
International career
Years	Team	Apps	(Points)
1924	Wales	1	(0)
1924	British Isles	1	(0)

Harold Davies (5 December 1898 – 29 March 1976) was a Welsh rugby union player who represented Wales and the British Lions. Davies played club rugby for Newport and captained the team in the 1925/26 season.

== Rugby career ==
Davies was first chosen to represent Wales in the 1922 Five Nations Championship game against France, but was replaced shortly before kick off, along with Swansea's Frank Palmer, by Cliff Richards and Islwyn Evans. Davies was selected on one occasion in 1924 to represent Wales in an infamous game against Scotland at Inverleith. Wales was completely outclassed letting in eight tries. Although Davies was never selected to play for Wales again he was chosen to represent the British Lions in their 1924 tour of South Africa. The 1924 tour was notorious for the amount of injuries suffered by the tourists, and Davies was called out at the late in the tour as a replacement. He played in just one game against South Africa, in the second test.

=== International matches played ===
Wales

- Scotland 1924

British Isles

- South Africa 1924

== Bibliography ==
- Godwin, Terry (1984). The International Rugby Championship 1883-1983. London: Willows Books. ISBN 0-00-218060-X.
- Griffiths, Terry (1987). The Phoenix Book of International Rugby Records. London: Phoenix House. ISBN 0-460-07003-7.
- Smith, David; Williams, Gareth (1980). Fields of Praise: The Official History of The Welsh Rugby Union. Cardiff: University of Wales Press. ISBN 0-7083-0766-3.

Rugby Union Captain
Preceded by Reg Edwards	Newport RFC captain 1925–1926	Succeeded by William Roche
