= Cliff Richards (rugby union) =

Welsh rugby union footballer (1901–1964)

- Born: William Clifford Richards; 28 March 1901 Hafodyrynys, Caerphilly County Borough, Wales
- Died: 13 February 1964 (aged 62) Crumlin, Wales
- Occupation: Collier

Rugby union career
- Position: Wing
Amateur team(s)
Years	Team	Apps	(Points)
–	Crumlin RFC		
–	Pontypool RFC		
–	Swansea RFC		
International career
Years	Team	Apps	(Points)
1922–1924	Wales	5	(6)

William Clifford Richards (28 March 1901 – 13 February 1964) was a Welsh international rugby union wing who played club rugby for Pontypool and Swansea and represented Wales at international level. Richards was a coal miner by trade, and worked in the pits all his adult life. In 1964, while working at the Navigation Colliery in Crumlin, he was killed in an underground accident.

== Rugby career ==
Richards was first capped for Wales while playing first class rugby for Pontypool. His first international game was against England in the opening Welsh match of the 1922 Five Nations Championship. Under the captaincy of Tom Parker, Wales were convincing winners over a far more experienced England, running in eight tries, of which Richards scored one. The 1922 Wales team was noted for its stability, with only two changes throughout the entire campaign. Richards played in all four matches, though was initially dropped for the final match of the tournament against France. The selectors had originally chosen Frank Palmer and Harold Davies, but switched to Richards and Islwyn Evans, just minutes before kick-off, as they believed they would be better suited to the harder French sun-baked pitch. At the end of the Championship, Wales won three games and drew the match against Scotland, lifting the tournament as out-right winners.

Richards played one final game for Wales, when he faced Ireland at the Cardiff Arms Park, in the third Welsh match of the 1924 Five Nations Championship. Although Richards scored the second try of his international career, Wales still lost the game and Richards was not selected for Wales again.

=== International matches played ===
Wales

- England 1922
- France 1922
- Ireland 1922, 1924
- Scotland 1922

== Bibliography ==
- Godwin, Terry (1984). The International Rugby Championship 1883-1983. London: Willows Books. ISBN 0-00-218060-X.
- Griffiths, John (1987). The Phoenix Book of International Rugby Records. London: Phoenix House. ISBN 0-460-07003-7.
- Smith, David; Williams, Gareth (1980). Fields of Praise: The Official History of The Welsh Rugby Union. Cardiff: University of Wales Press. ISBN 0-7083-0766-3.
