= Frank Sanders =

Frank Sanders may refer to:

- Frank P. Sanders (1919–1997), U.S. Under Secretary of the Navy
- Frank Sanders (American football) (born 1973), former American football player
- Frank Sanders (ice hockey) (1949–2012), American ice hockey player
- Frank Knight Sanders, American missionary, theologian, scholar and congregational minister
- Frank Sanders (rugby union) (1893–1953), English international rugby union player
- Frankie Sanders (born 1957), American basketball player
