= William Cummins (rugby union) =

Wales international rugby union footballer

- Born: William Cummins; 20 March 1892
- Died: Unknown
- Occupation: police officer

Rugby union career
- Position: Number 8
Amateur team(s)
Years	Team	Apps	(Points)
- St. Peters RFC
–	Treorchy RFC		
–	Penygraig RFC		
–	Glamorgan Police		
International career
Years	Team	Apps	(Points)
1922	Wales	4	(3)

William 'Will' Cummins (20 March 1892 – ?) was a Welsh international rugby union player who played club rugby union for Treorchy and was capped four times for Wales, all during the 1922 Five Nations Championship.

== Rugby career ==
Cummins was first selected to play for Wales in the opening match of the 1922 Five Nations Championship game against England. Under the captaincy of Tom Parker, Wales were rampant over England scoring a record eight tries. Cummins retained his place in the next game over Scotland, which saw Wales grab a late draw thanks to an Islwyn Evans late drop kick. After another win in the third game of the tournament over Ireland, Cummins played his final international game when he played France in Paris. Cummins scored his only points for Wales during this game, scoring one of three tries in the game; the other two scored by Evans and Jack Whitfield. Although becoming a Five Nations Championship winner and not appearing in a losing team, Cummins would never play for Wales again.

=== International matches played ===
Wales

- England 1922
- France 1922
- Ireland 1922
- Scotland 1922

== Bibliography ==
- Godwin, Terry (1984). The International Rugby Championship 1883-1983. London: Willows Books. ISBN 0-00-218060-X.
- Smith, David; Williams, Gareth (1980). Fields of Praise: The Official History of The Welsh Rugby Union. Cardiff: University of Wales Press. ISBN 0-7083-0766-3.
