= Edward Beynon =

Eddie Beynon
- Full name: George Edward Beynon
- Born: 1 March 1902 Oystermouth, Wales
- Died: 14 October 1957 (aged 55) Carshalton, England

Rugby union career
- Position: Wing forward
International career
Years	Team	Apps	(Points)
1925	Wales	2	(0)

George Edward Beynon (1 March 1902 – 14 October 1957) was a Welsh international rugby union player.

Beynon grew up in the Mumbles area and played his early rugby with local side Oystermouth Athletic.

A wing forward, Beynon was known for his skills with the dribble kick and gained selection by Wales via Swansea. He was capped twice, playing for Wales in back to back 1925 Five Nations fixtures, against France and Ireland.

Beynon, a police detective, worked for the Ministry of War Transport in World War II and was decorated with the British Empire Medal. He served as Northern Area Chief of the British Transport Commission Police during the 1950s.

== See also ==
- List of Wales national rugby union players
