= John Stephens (rugby union) =

- Full name: John Griffith Stephens
- Born: 30 October 1893 Taliesin, Wales
- Died: 14 May 1956 (aged 62) Barton-le-Willows, England

Rugby union career
- Position: Wing forward
International career
Years	Team	Apps	(Points)
1922	Wales	4	(0)

John Griffith Stephens (October 30, 1893 – May 14, 1956) was a Welsh international rugby union player.

A Llanelly forward, Stephens represented Wales during their Championship–winning 1922 Five Nations campaign, appearing in all four possibles matches. He subsequently joined the Royal Air Force as a chaplain and didn't feature again for Wales. From 1929 to 1954, Stephens was the rector of St John's Church in Darlington, then he became rector of Bossall. His wife, Ruby Bray, was a noted Yorkshire tennis player.

== See also ==
- List of Wales national rugby union players
