= Brinley Evans =

- Full name: Brinley Samuel Evans
- Born: 21 January 1894 Felinfoel, Wales
- Died: 28 June 1964 (aged 70) Llanelly, Wales
- Height: 5 ft 10 in (178 cm)
- Weight: 11 st 10 lb (164 lb; 74 kg)

Rugby union career
- Position: Centre
International career
Years	Team	Apps	(Points)
1920–22	Wales	5	(0)

Brinley Samuel Evans (21 January 1894 – 28 June 1964) was a Welsh international rugby union player.

A native of Felinfoel, Evans was educated at Llanelly County School and London University.

Evans had a season with London Welsh in 1913–14 and played Army rugby during the wartime years, after which he joined Llanelly RFC. He was primarily a centre three–quarter, but made his Wales debut in 1920 next to Albert Jenkins on the wing, reportedly due to an administrative error as selectors had intended to call up his Llanelly teammate Brinley Williams. On his return to the Wales side in 1922, Evans was used in his customary position of right centre and featured in all four matches in a championship–winning campaign.

== See also ==
- List of Wales national rugby union players
