= Islwyn Evans =

Wales international rugby union footballer

- Born: Haydn Islwyn Evans; 25 December 1898 Llanelli, Wales
- Died: 13 May 1974 (aged 75) Llanelli, Wales
- Height: 5 ft 8 in (1.73 m)
- Weight: 10 st 6 lb (66 kg)
- Occupation(s): Electrician at Trostre Steel Works, Llanelli

Rugby union career
- Position: Centre
Amateur team(s)
Years	Team	Apps	(Points)
1920-1923	Swansea RFC		
–	Llanelli RFC		
International career
Years	Team	Apps	(Points)
1921-1922	Wales	4	(13)

Haydn Islwyn Evans (25 December 1898 – 13 May 1974) was a Welsh international rugby union player who played club rugby union for Swansea and Llanelli. Evans was capped four times for Wales, all during the 1922 Five Nations Championship.

== Rugby career ==
Evans was first selected for Wales in 1922 while representing Swansea at club level. Evans first game was against England at the Cardiff Arms Park under the captaincy of Tom Parker. Wales won in style, scoring a then record eight tries. All five Swansea players representing Wales in that match scored, Evans, Parker, Bowen and Palmer all scored tries, and Joe Rees completed two conversions. Evans was back on the scoresheet in his very next match, scoring a very late drop goal to grab a draw against Scotland at Inverleith. Evans scored in both remaining games of the tournament, scoring tries in both wins over Ireland and then France. In the game against France, Evans was not originally chosen to play, but shortly before the kick-off the Welsh selectors dropped Frank Palmer and Harold Davies, and replaced them with Evans and Cliff Richards. Although becoming a Championship winner and scoring in every international game, Evans was not selected to represent Wales after 1922. This was due to having to retire from rugby because of a serious cartilage injury to his knee.

=== International matches played ===
Wales

- England 1922
- France 1922
- Ireland 1922
- Scotland 1922

== Bibliography ==
- Godwin, Terry (1984). The International Rugby Championship 1883-1983. London: Willows Books. ISBN 0-00-218060-X.
- Smith, David; Williams, Gareth (1980). Fields of Praise: The Official History of The Welsh Rugby Union. Cardiff: University of Wales Press. ISBN 0-7083-0766-3.
