= Glyn Morris =

- Full name: Joseph Ivor Thomas Morris
- Born: 4 August 1901 Burry Port, Wales
- Died: 10 September 1964 (aged 63) Paddington, England
- Height: 6 ft (183 cm)
- Weight: 81 kg (179 lb)

Rugby union career
- Position: Prop
International career
Years	Team	Apps	(Points)
1924	Wales	2	(0)

Joseph Ivor Thomas Morris (4 August 1901 – 10 September 1964) was a Welsh international rugby union player.

A native of Loughor, Morris played his rugby with Swansea RFC and was capped twice for Wales. He appeared in the Wales pack for matches against England and Scotland during the 1924 Five Nations.

Morris was a Ystalyfera–based police constable at the time of his Wales caps.

== See also ==
- List of Wales national rugby union players
