= Cliff Richard (disambiguation) =

Cliff Richard is a British singer and actor.

Cliff Richard or Richards may also refer to:

- Cliff Richard and the Shadows, a musical formation with Cliff Richard as lead singer and The Shadows as his backing band
  - Reunited – Cliff Richard and The Shadows, a 2009 studio album by British pop singer Cliff Richard and his original backing band The Shadows
- Cliff Richard (1965 album), a self-titled album by Cliff Richard
- Cliff Richards (rugby union) (1901–1964), Welsh international rugby union wing
