= Afon Gwili (Loughor) =

River in South Wales

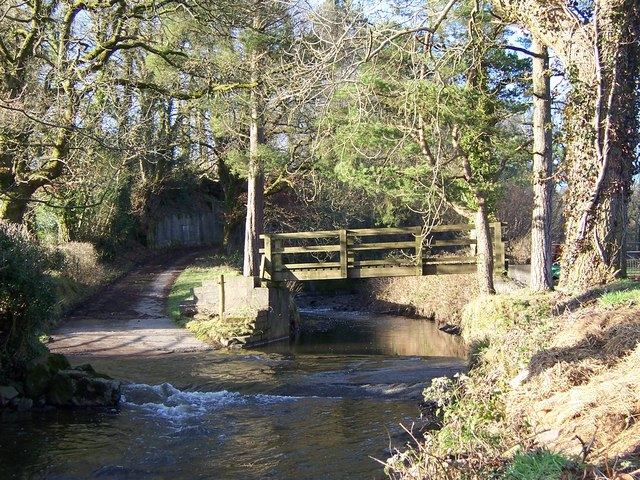
- Ford and Footbridge over the Gwili near Cwmgwili

- Location within Wales

Location
- Country: Wales
- County: Carmarthenshire

Physical characteristics
- Source
  - location: Near Cross Hands
- Mouth: River Loughor
  - location: Near Pontarddulais
  - coordinates: 51.7093417°N 4.0521062°W

The Afon Gwili is a right-bank tributary of the River Loughor in the east of Carmarthenshire, South Wales. It rises near Cross Hands before flowing in a generally southerly direction past the small village of Cwmgwili to join with the Loughor beyond Hendy near Pontarddulais.
