= Hendy =

Village in Carmarthenshire, Wales

Coordinates: 51.713°N 4.057°W

Hendy: Welsh: Yr Hendy
- Location within Carmarthenshire
- Population: 3,226 (ward 2011)
- OS grid reference: SN579035
- Community: Llanedi
- Principal area: Carmarthenshire
- Preserved county: Dyfed
- Country: Wales
- Sovereign state: United Kingdom
- Post town: SWANSEA
- Postcode district: SA4
- Dialling code: 01792
- Police: Dyfed-Powys
- Fire: Mid and West Wales
- Ambulance: Welsh
- UK Parliament: Llanelli
- Senedd Cymru – Welsh Parliament: Llanelli

Hendy (Welsh: Yr Hendy) is a village in the community of Llanedi in Carmarthenshire, Wales. It is situated at the Carmarthenshire and Swansea border, and lies on Afon Gwili, just across the River Loughor from Pontarddulais. Together with Fforest to the north, it forms part of a continuous built-up area centred on Pontarddulais. Most of the village sits between the M4 Motorway junction 48 and the A48 road (Fforest Road) north of the motorway.

The area is represented in the Senedd by Lee Waters (Labour) and in the UK Parliament by Nia Griffith (Labour). Gareth Beynon Thomas (Plaid Cymru) is local county councillor and the community council is made up of Plaid Cymru and Independent members.

== History ==
=== Etymology ===
Hendy comes from the Welsh for 'Old House'.

=== Industry ===
A tinplate works was established in 1870. Forty houses were built by the owners to accommodate the workers, though some built their own homes which eventually led to it becoming a sizeable village.

== Amenities and sports ==
Hendy RFC (Clwb Rygbi Yr Hendy) is the village's rugby union team. Hendy Park (Parc yr Hendy) is where the team play on its pitch, and the park also contains a playground and multi-game areas. The village once also had a cricket field and other sport facilities. A trail opened in 2020 around the old cricket ground.

The old Hendy Cricket Club was converted to Canolfan Gwili Centre, a community centre, by the community council. It opened in 2024.

== Notable people ==
- John Jenkins (1872–1936), a Welsh poet and theologian; bardic name of Gwili
- Dai Hiddlestone (1890–1973), a Welsh international rugby union player who played for Neath RFC
- Bryn Howells (1911–1983), a Welsh rugby union, and professional rugby league footballer
- Terry Price (1945–1993), an international rugby union, and professional rugby league footballer.
- Steven Shingler (born 20 June 1991) Welsh professional rugby union player, Wales U20 international
- Geraint the Snakeman (born 1955), a TV personality who works with reptiles, real name Geraint Wyn Hopkins
