= Bryn Howells =

Wales international rugby union & league footballer

Personal information
- Full name: Bryn Howells
- Born: 9 February 1911; Hendy, Wales
- Died: 6 June 1983 (aged 72); Llangyfelach, Wales

Playing information

Rugby union
- Position: Fullback
Club
Years	Team	Pld	T	G	FG	P
≤1934–≥34	Llanelli RFC
Representative
Years	Team	Pld	T	G	FG	P
1934	Wales	1	0	0	0	0

Rugby league
Club
Years	Team	Pld	T	G	FG	P
1934–41	Broughton Rangers	152	4	217		446
- Source: scrum.com

Bryn Howells (9 February 1911 – 6 June 1983) was a Welsh rugby union, and professional rugby league footballer who played in the 1930s and 1940s. He played representative level rugby union (RU) for Wales, and at club level for Llanelli RFC, as a Fullback, and club level rugby league (RL) for Broughton Rangers.

== Background ==
Bryn Howells was born in Hendy, Wales, he was also a professional cricketer in the Lancashire League, he shared a house in Fallowfield with Frank Whitcombe when the two signed for rugby league club Broughton Rangers, and he died in aged 72 in Llangyfelach, Wales.

== International honours ==
Bryn Howells won a cap for Wales (RU) while at Llanelli RFC in 1934 against England.

== Notable tour matches ==
Bryn Howells played Fullback in Llanelli RFC’s 0-9 defeat by South Africa in the tour match at Stradey Park on 24 November 1931.
