= Washburn University =

Public university in Topeka, Kansas, US

Washburn University of Topeka
- Former names: Lincoln College (1865–1868); Washburn College (1868–1941); Washburn Municipal University (1941–1952)
- Motto: Non Nobis Solum (Latin)
- Motto in English: "Not for Ourselves Alone"
- Type: Public university
- Established: February 6, 1865; 161 years ago
- Accreditation: HLC
- Endowment: $213.4 million (2025)
- President: JuliAnn Mazachek
- Provost: John Fritch
- Academic staff: 1,000
- Students: 5,663 (fall 2023)
- Undergraduates: 4,930 (fall 2023)
- Postgraduates: 733 (fall 2023)
- Location: Topeka, Kansas, US; 39°02′02″N 95°41′56″W
- Campus: 160 acres (0.65 km^{2}); Midsize city
- Colors: Yale blue and white
- Nickname: Ichabods
- Sporting affiliations: NCAA Division II – The MIAA
- Mascot: The Ichabod
- Website: washburn.edu

Washburn University (WU), formally Washburn University of Topeka, is a public university in Topeka, Kansas, United States. It offers undergraduate and graduate programs as well as professional programs in law and business. The university enrolls approximately 5,000 undergraduate students and 700 graduate students as of 2023. As of 2008, Washburn also took over overseeing the nearby Washburn Tech.

== History ==
Washburn University was established at Topeka, Kansas, in February 1865 as "Lincoln College", by a charter issued by the State of Kansas and the General Association of Congregational Ministers and Churches of Kansas; the land on which the college stood was donated by abolitionist John Ritchie. The institution was renamed "Washburn College" in 1868, after Ichabod Washburn pledged $25,000 to the school. Washburn was a church deacon, abolitionist, and industrialist who lived in Worcester, Massachusetts.

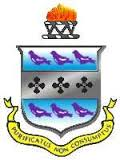
Washburn College adopted a variation of the Washbourne arms as its emblem, substituting the school colors for the tinctures of the arms. Since becoming a university, however, Washburn has abandoned use of the family arms. Instead, the university now employs a stylized "W" as the emblem of the institution. The school mascot, "The Ichabod", is still in use.

"The Ichabod" honors the namesake and early benefactor of the institution, Ichabod Washburn. "The Ichabod" existed only in name until 1938, when alumnus (and later prominent graphic artist) Bradbury Thompson (B.A., 1934) created the studious-looking, tailcoat-wearing figure the university uses today. The athletic teams are nicknamed "Ichabods", although women's teams did not use that nickname until the 2013–14 school year.

In 1913, the medical department of Washburn College closed. The medical school had become infamous on December 10, 1895, when the public discovered that some of the bodies used for anatomical study had been stolen from local cemeteries. As the news was being printed (eventually across the country), the governor, fearing riots, called out state troops to protect the school. Three of the doctors, including the dean of the school, and a student-janitor from the school were arrested, as was one man who was not a member of the school. Charges against the doctors were discharged, the janitor was convicted but had his conviction reversed on appeal, and the fifth man was convicted but later pardoned.

During World War II, Washburn Municipal University was one of 131 colleges and universities in the nation taking part in the V-12 Navy College Training Program, which offered students a path to a Navy commission.

On June 8, 1966, only a few days after classes were dismissed for the summer, much of the campus was demolished by a tornado, and completely denuded of trees. Three months before the tornado struck, the Washburn board of trustees had reinsured every building on campus for the maximum amount. A week after the tornado struck, summer classes began at Topeka West High School. By the fall of 1966, Stoffer Hall was repaired. It took years to reconstruct the campus, with students attending classes in trailers well into the early 1970s.

Formerly a municipal university, the university's primary funding was moved from city property tax to county sales tax sources in 1999, with the school retaining status as a municipal subdivision of the state. Washburn is governed by its own nine-member Board of Regents.

== Academics ==
=== Undergraduate admissions ===
Academic rankings

Regional
- U.S. News & World Report: 74 (West) (tied)

Washburn University has an acceptance rate of 100%. The university doesn't consider a student's GPA, SAT or ACT scores, or an applicant's high school class rank or letters of recommendation.

=== Ranking ===
U.S. News & World Report ranks the university tied at No.74 in Regional Universities Midwest out of 161 ranked midwest universities.

== Organization and administration ==
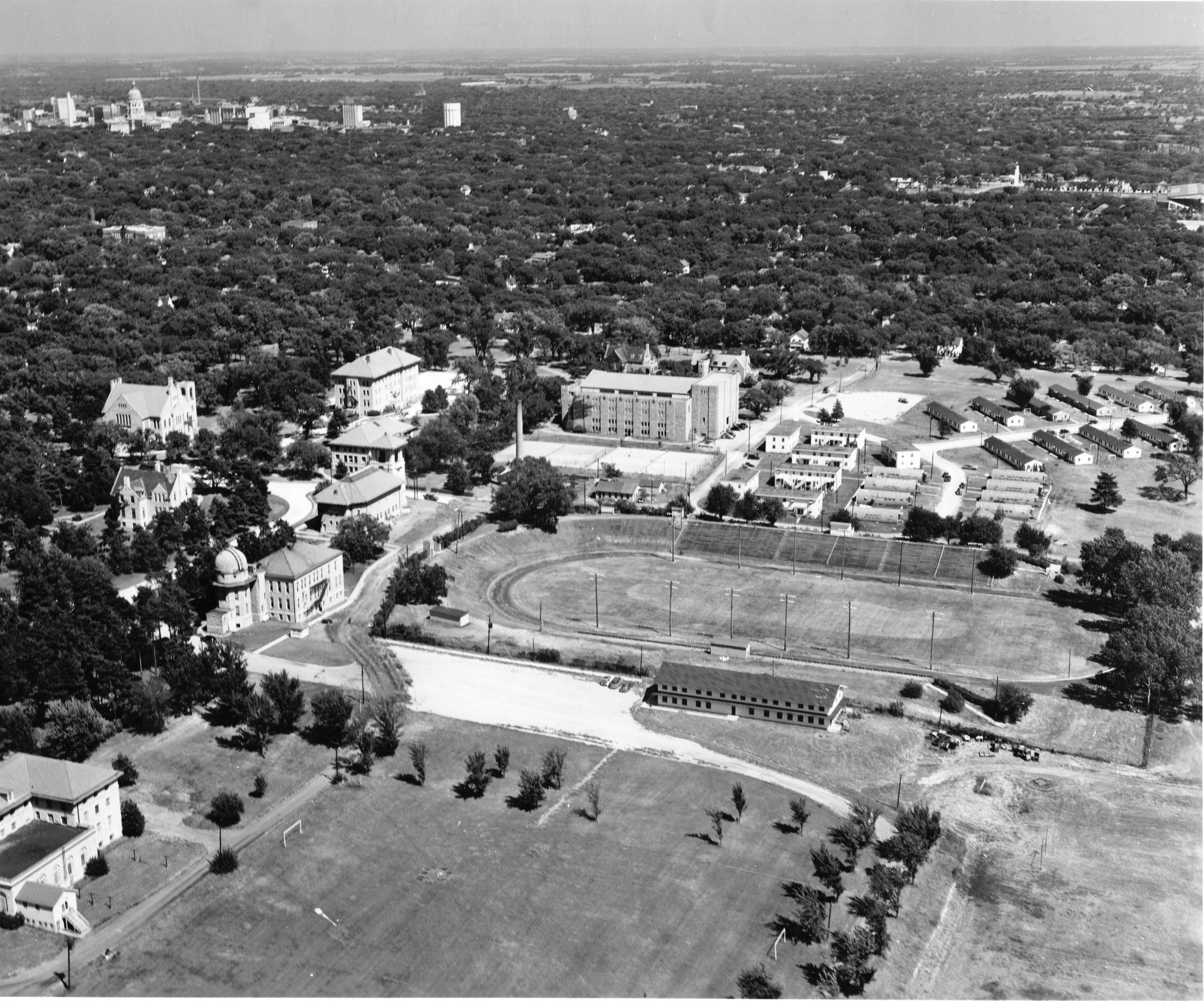
Aerial view of Washburn campus in 1948

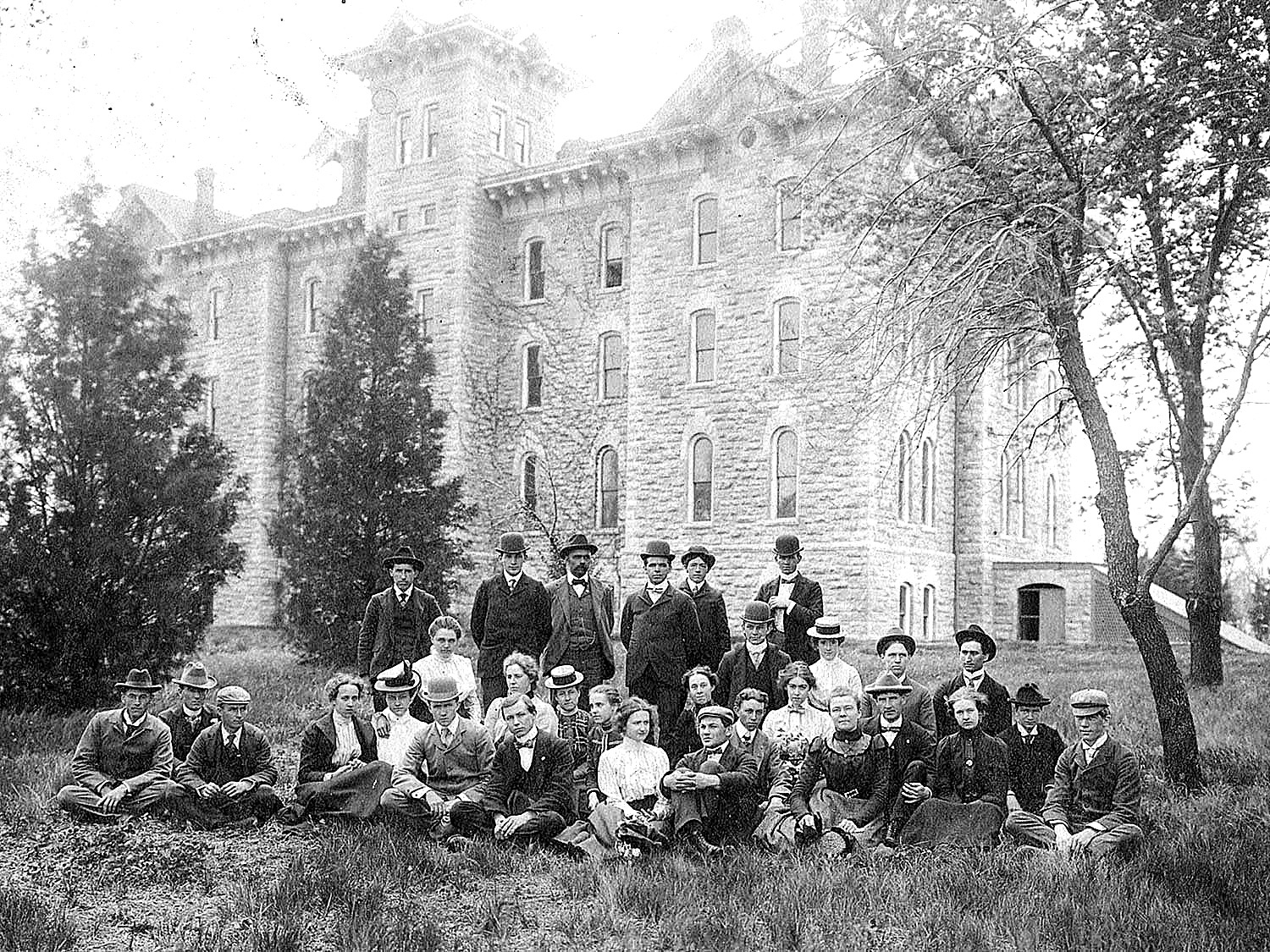
Class of 1900 in front of Rice Hall

Washburn University is governed by a nine-member board of regents. Three, who must be residents of the state of Kansas, are appointed by the governor. Three residents of the City of Topeka, one from each of the state senatorial districts, are appointed by the mayor. One is the mayor or a member of the governing body of the city designated by the mayor. The Shawnee County Commission appoints one member, who must be a resident of Shawnee County but not of the City of Topeka. The Kansas Board of Regents annually selects one of its members to serve on the Washburn Board. Members of the board (with the exception of the Kansas Board of Regents' appointee) serve staggered four-year terms.

=== Presidents ===
These persons have served as presidents or interim presidents of Washburn College (1869–1940), Washburn Municipal University of Topeka (1941–1952), and Washburn University (1952–present).

Name	Years
Horatio Q. Butterfield	1869–1870
Peter McVicar	1871–1895
George M. Herrick	1896–1901
Norman Plass	1902–1908
Frank Knight Sanders	1908–1914
Parley P. Womer	1915–1931
Philip C. King	1931–1941
Arthur G. Sellen	1941–1942
Bryan S. Stoffer	1942–1961
Harold E. Sponberg	1961–1965
John W. Henderson	1965–1980
John L. Green Jr.	1981–1988
John Duggan	1988
Robert L. Burns	1988–1990
Hugh L. Thompson	1990–1997
Jerry Farley	1997–2022
Marshall Meek (interim)	2022–2023
JuliAnn Mazachek	2023–present
15 presidents; 3 interims; 154 years

=== Law school ===
Formed in 1903, the Washburn School of Law was one of the first in the country to have a legal clinic where students are able to actively practice the legal profession. The Washburn Law Library houses over 113,000 titles. Notable alumni include Bob Dole, Paul J. Morrison, Roy Wilford Riegle, Dennis Moore, Kay McFarland, Bill Kurtis, and Fred Phelps.

== Athletics ==
The Washburn athletic teams are called the Ichabods. The university is a member of the NCAA Division II ranks, primarily competing in the Mid-America Intercollegiate Athletics Association (MIAA) since the 1989–90 academic year. The Ichabods previously competed in the Central States Intercollegiate Conference (CSIC) of the National Association of Intercollegiate Athletics (NAIA) from 1976–77 to 1988–89; in the Great Plains Athletic Conference (GPAC) from 1972–73 to 1975–76; in the Rocky Mountain Athletic Conference (RMAC) from 1968–69 to 1971–72; in the Central Intercollegiate Athletic Conference (CIC) from 1940–41 to 1967–68 (which they were a member on a previous stint from 1923–24 to 1932–33); as an Independent from 1933–34 to 1939–40; and in the Kansas Collegiate Athletic Conference (KCAC) from 1902–03 to 1922–23.

Washburn competes in 16 intercollegiate varsity sports: Men's sports include baseball, basketball, cross country, football, golf, tennis and track & field (indoor and outdoor); while women's sports include basketball, cross country, soccer, softball, tennis, track & field (indoor and outdoor) and volleyball.

=== Nickname ===
The "Ichabods" nickname is named after the university's contributor Ichabod Washburn, who was also the founder of Worcester Polytechnic Institute. Prior to the 2013–14 season, the women's athletic teams were known as the "Lady Blues". On May 24, 2013, President Farley announced that all athletic teams will be known as the Ichabods for the first time in history.

== Student life ==
Undergraduate demographics as of Fall 2023
Race and ethnicity	Total
White	62%
Hispanic	15%
Black	8%
Two or more races	7%
International student	5%
Unknown	2%
American Indian/Alaska Native	1%
Asian	1%
Economic diversity
Low-income (Note: The percentage of students who received an income-based federal Pell grant intended for low-income students.)	37%
Affluent (Note: The percentage of students who are a part of the American middle class at the bare minimum.)	63%

=== Greek life ===
Greek Life at Washburn University has existed since 1909. As of 2026, there are three active sororities from the National Panhellenic Council on campus: Alpha Phi, Delta Gamma, and Zeta Tau Alpha, with the former two having formal sorority houses. Additionally, there are four fraternities on Washburn's campus as of 2026: Alpha Delta, Kappa Sigma, Phi Delta Theta, and Sigma Phi Epsilon, with all but Kappa Sigma having formal fraternity housing.

Multicultural sororities also exist on campus. As of 2026, there are three multicultural sororities at Washburn: Alpha Kappa Alpha, Sigma Lambda Gamma, and Zeta Phi Beta.

== Campus attractions ==
- Crane Observatory houses an 1898 Warner & Swasey refracting telescope.
- Mulvane Art Museum opened in 1924. The museum's permanent collection emphasizes the work of artists of Kansas and the Midwest.
- Walking Bods, seven steel sculptures crafted by Barrett DeBusk.
