= Rowe Harding =

British Lions & Wales international rugby union footballer

- Harding c. 1925
- Born: W. Rowe Harding; 10 September 1901 Birchgrove, Swansea, Wales
- Died: 10 February 1991 (aged 89) Gower, Wales
- School: Gowerton Grammar School
- Occupation: Judge

Rugby union career
- Position: Wing
Amateur team(s)
Years	Team	Apps	(Points)
1919–1920	Loughor RFC		
1920	Llanelli RFC		
1920–1929	Swansea RFC		
1926–1927	Cambridge University R.U.F.C.		
- London Welsh RFC
1923–24	Barbarian F.C.		
International career
Years	Team	Apps	(Points)
1923–1928	Wales	17	(15)
1924	British Isles	3	(0)

W. Rowe Harding (10 September 1901 – 10 February 1991) was a Welsh international rugby union wing who played club rugby for Swansea, a barrister, and a judge. An intelligent player, Harding played for several teams at club and international level. He attended Cambridge University and appeared in several varsity matches. He retired from rugby at the age of 28 when he was called to the bar, and would later become a County Court judge. He spent his later life connected with sports administration serving as Welsh Rugby Union vice-president as well as chairman and president of Glamorgan County Cricket Club.

== Club career ==
After playing his early career with Loughor, Harding was selected to play for Llanelli and his natural speed was used on the right wing. After only eight games he was switched to the left to play outside Albert Jenkins. In his first game in his new position, in a game against Penarth, Harding was given three perfect passes and dropped all three. After this performance he was dropped by Llanelli and transferred to Swansea. On 8 November Harding made his debut for Swansea against Cambridge University.

In 1926, while a student studying law at Cambridge, he would play for Cambridge in four varsity matches, scoring tries in the 1926 and 1927 match, and captaining the university in 1927.

== International rugby career ==
Rowe gained his first international cap against England on 20 January 1923, which Wales lost 7–3. He would gain 17 caps in total scoring five tries for his country. In 1924 Rowe missed the home nation matches against England and Scotland after breaking his collar-bone at Christmas; but later in the season, in the match against France at the Stade Colombes, Rowe captained Wales for the first time, an honour he would achieve on another three occasions.

In 1924 Rowe was chosen to represent the British Isles on their Tour of South Africa. Rowe was chosen to play in three tests.

=== International matches played ===
Wales

- England 1923, 1926, 1927, 1928
- France 1923, 1924, 1925, 1926, 1927
- Ireland 1923, 1924, 1925, 1926, 1927
- New Zealand 1924
- Scotland 1923, 1927

British Isles

- South Africa 1924

== Outside rugby ==
Rowe retired from rugby at the age of 28 when he was called to the bar, and would later become a County Court judge in 1953. Harding spent his later life connected with all manner of sports. He was Welsh Rugby Union vice-president from 1953 to 1956, chairman and president of Glamorgan County Cricket Club, president of Swansea Lawn Tennis and Squash Rackets Club and patron of Cwmgors RFC.

Harding was a published author of the rugby book, Rugby Reminiscences and Opinions which is noted for its forthright and blunt viewpoints on the issues affecting Welsh rugby at the time, for example, while addressing the Welsh Rugby Union in 1950 "The Rugby League is only an infant, but it wants strangling."

=== Elizabeth and Rowe Harding Reserve ===
Harding has a wildlife reserve named after himself and his wife, after they donated sections of the land to the Wildlife trust for South and South West Wales. The reserve is called the Elizabeth and Rowe Harding Reserve and consists of a woodland and quarry face near Ilston village in the Gower. The site is open to the public and is noted for its flora and as a nesting site for kestrels.

== Published works ==
- Rugby Reminiscences and Opinions; Pilot Press, London (1929)

== Bibliography ==
- Smith, David; Williams, Gareth (1980). Fields of Praise: The Official History of The Welsh Rugby Union. Cardiff: University of Wales Press. ISBN 0-7083-0766-3.
- Thomas, Wayne (1979). A Century of Welsh Rugby Players. Ansells Ltd.
