= Geraint the Snakeman =

Welsh television personality

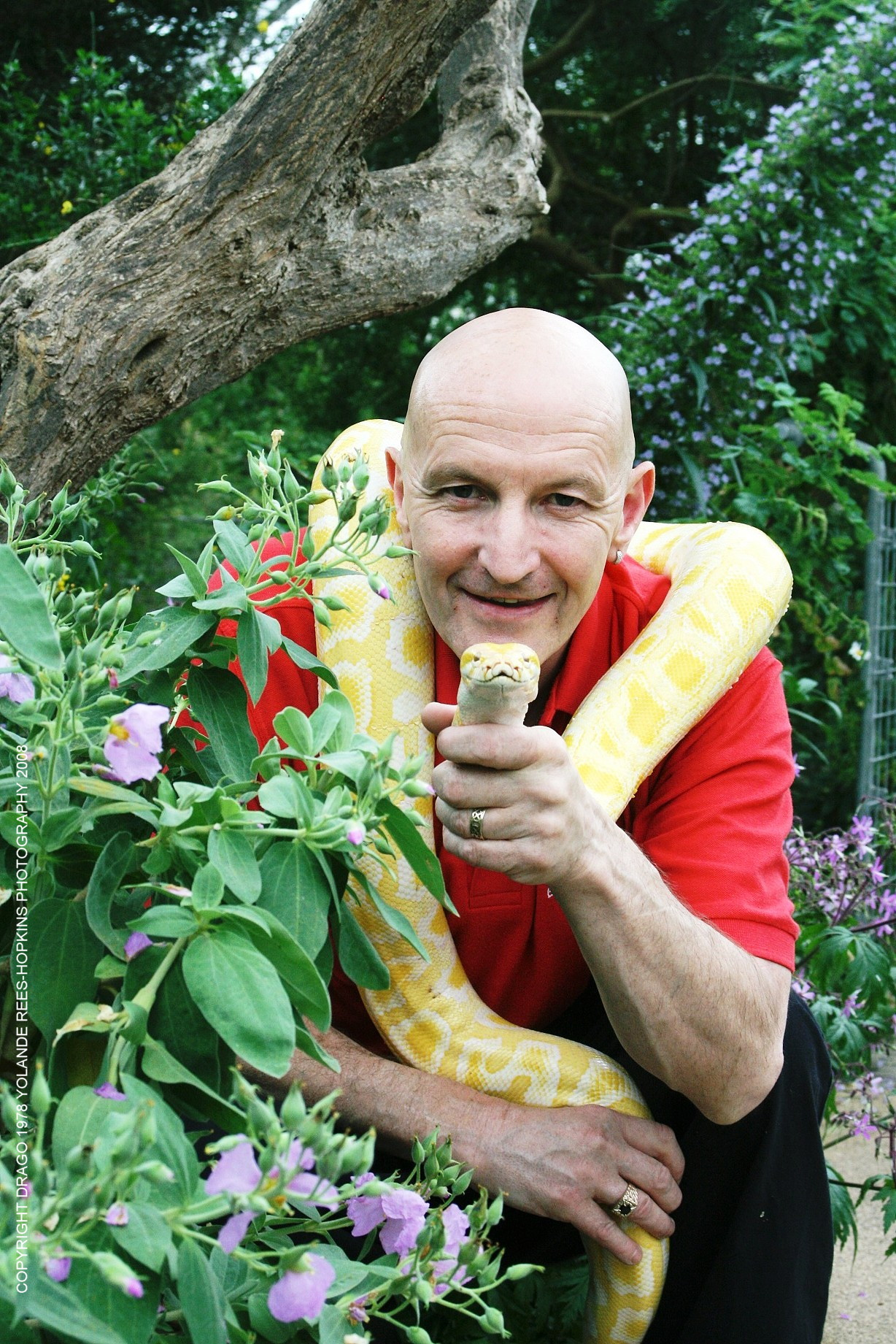

Geraint Wyn Hopkins, otherwise known as Geraint the Snakeman, is a television personality known for his work with reptiles. He has presented programmes on exotic pets in the UK and appeared on a number of programmes on animals, pets, ghosts and local affairs. He also runs Ghost Watch Wales, a paranormal investigation business, and is credited with inviting Most Haunted to a number of locations in Llanelli, Carmarthenshire and Port Talbot.

Hopkins was born in Hendy, Wales, and has lived in Llanelli most of his life. He was named the snakeman after his charity work, raising funds for various charities through his shows with reptiles. Since the 1990s Hopkins has been more involved with conservation of British species and husbandry of tropical species of reptiles and amphibians. He visits schools and colleges giving educational talks and displays on reptiles and advises veterinarians on reptile diseases.

Hopkins has been a controversial figure politically standing up for local causes including the fight to save the Prince Philip Hospital A&E department and the neurosurgery at Morriston Hospital.

Hopkins has given private showings and talks to a number of celebrities including Anthony Hopkins and frequently gives educational talks at Margam Country Park near Port Talbot.
