= Frank Sanders (rugby union) =

England international rugby union player

- Full name: Frank Warren Sanders
- Born: 24 January 1893 Newton Abbot, England
- Died: 22 June 1953 (aged 60) Plymouth, England

Rugby union career
- Position: Hooker
International career
Years	Team	Apps	(Points)
1923	England	3	(0)

Frank Warren Sanders (24 January 1893 – 22 June 1953) was an English international rugby union player.

A hooker, Sanders started out with Dartmouth Athletic and joined Plymouth Albion after the war.

Sanders gained three England caps as part of their grand slam-winning 1923 Five Nations campaign, playing the matches against Ireland, Scotland and France. He formed an All-Devon front row with Ernie Gardner and Bill Luddington.

In 1924, Sanders was captain of the Devon County side that played the touring "Invincible" All Blacks.

Sanders was a patternmaker by trade.

== See also ==
- List of England national rugby union players
