= Terry Price (rugby) =

Welsh rugby union and rugby league footballer

Terence Price
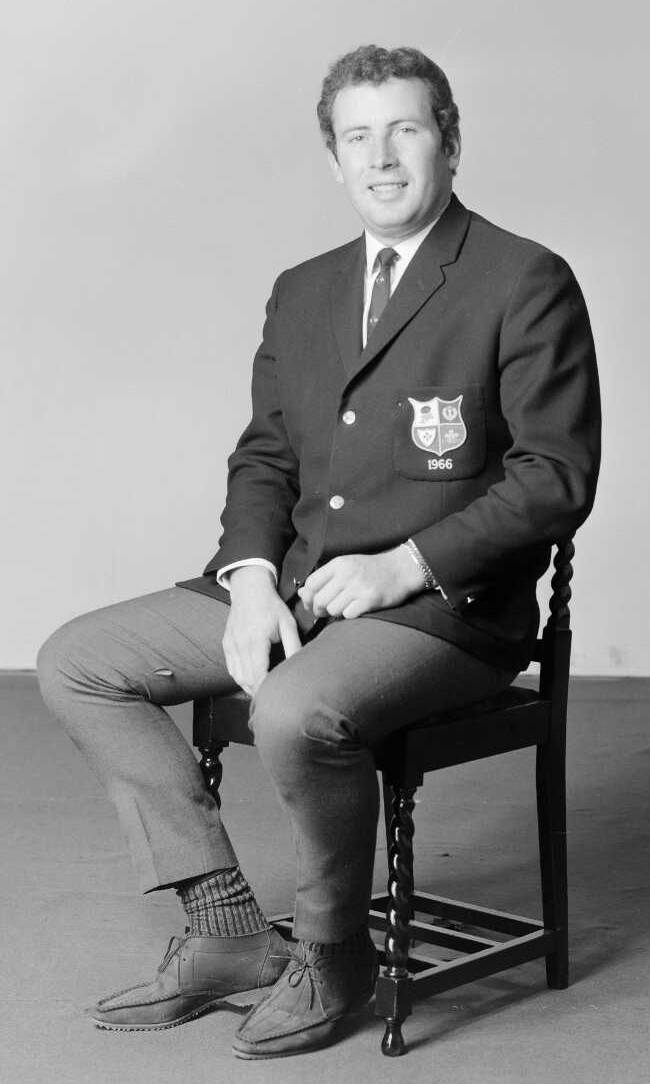
- Price in New Zealand in 1966

Personal information
- Full name: Terence Graham Price
- Born: 16 July 1945; Hendy, Wales
- Died: 7 April 1993 (aged 47); Bicester, Oxfordshire, England

Playing information

Rugby union
- Position: Fullback
Club
| Years | Team | Pld | T | G | FG | P |
|---|---|---|---|---|---|---|
| ≤1965–67 | Llanelli RFC |
Representative
| Years | Team | Pld | T | G | FG | P |
| 1965–67 | Wales | 8 | 0 | 17 | 1 | 45 |
| 1966 | British Lions | 0 | | | | 0 |

Rugby league
- Position: Fullback
Club
| Years | Team | Pld | T | G | FG | P |
|---|---|---|---|---|---|---|
| 1967–71 | Bradford Northern | 123 | 25 | 384 | 0 | 843 |
Representative
| Years | Team | Pld | T | G | FG | P |
| 1968–70 | Wales | 5 | 0 | 2 | 1 | 9 |
| 1970 | Great Britain | 1 | 0 | 3 | 0 | 6 |

Terence Graham Price (16 July 1945 – 7 April 1993) was a Welsh dual-code international rugby union, and professional rugby league footballer who played in the 1960s and 1970s. He played representative rugby union (RU) for the British Lions, and Wales, and at club level for Llanelli, as a fullback, and representative rugby League (RL) for Great Britain and Wales, and at club level for Bradford Northern, as a fullback.

In 1971, he tried out as a placekicker in American football for the NFL's Buffalo Bills, but he did not play for them.

Price was born in Hendy, Wales, and he died aged 47 in a road accident in Bicester, Oxfordshire, while helping a motorist whose car had broken down.

== Playing career ==
=== International honours ===
Notably dropping the goal against Ireland at the Cardiff Arms Park, Cardiff in 1965 thus winning Wales their first Triple Crown since 1953. Price represented the British Lions (RU) while at Llanelli RFC on the 1966 tour of Australia and New Zealand, won 5 caps for Wales (RU) in 1968–1970 while at Llanelli RFC in 1965 against England, Scotland, Ireland, and France, in 1966 against England, and Australia, and in 1967 against Scotland, and France, won a cap for Great Britain (RL) while at Bradford Northern in 1970 against Australia, and won caps for Wales (RL) while at Bradford Northern.

=== Club career ===
As a schoolboy at Llanelli Boys' Grammar School, he played for Llanelli ('West Wales XV') versus Wilson Whineray's 1963 all blacks and broke the jaw of tour hard man Waka Nathan, putting him out of action for the rest of the tour. Price signed for Bradford Northern on 26 July 1967 for a then club record signing-on fee of £8,000 (based on increases in average earnings, this would be approximately £253,000 in 2013), such was his reputation that crowds of 700–800 people turned up just to watch him train, and match day crowds increased by 1,500–2,000 per game.

== Personal life ==
Price was the grandson of the rugby union footballer Dai Hiddlestone.
