= Walking Bods =

Coordinates: 39°02′09″N 95°42′10″W

The Walking Bods are a set of seven steel sculptures crafted by Barrett DeBusk. They stand 9 feet tall, and are each a different, solid color. They are on permanent display on the Washburn University Campus in Topeka, Kansas (between Stauffer Commons and the Mulvane Art Museum). They were first put on display through the summer of 2004. DeBusk was inspired for these sculptures while walking down Sixth Avenue in Manhattan. He said "I was struck by the mass of people, all moving in different directions, so alike but so different. My Bods represent different people in their daily march of life."

A twin set of "Bods" named Walking Bobs can be found on permanent display at the University of West Alabama.
