= Dick Huxtable =

- Born: Richard Huxtable; 13 October 1890 Swansea, Wales
- Died: 29 August 1970 (aged 79) Swansea, Wales
- Occupation: Tinplater

Rugby union career
- Position: Flanker
Amateur team(s)
Years	Team	Apps	(Points)
- Glais RFC
–	Swansea RFC		
International career
Years	Team	Apps	(Points)
1920	Wales	2	(0)

Richard Huxtable (13 October 1890 – 29 August 1970) was a Welsh international rugby union wing who played club rugby for Swansea captaining the team during the 1921–22 season. He won two caps for Wales both during the 1920 Five Nations Championship.

== Bibliography ==
- Godwin, Terry (1984). The International Rugby Championship 1883-1983. Grafton Street, London: Willow Books. ISBN 000218060X.
- Smith, David; Williams, Gareth (1980). Fields of Praise: The Official History of The Welsh Rugby Union. Cardiff: University of Wales Press. ISBN 0708307663.

Rugby Union Captain
Preceded by Tom Parker	Swansea RFC Captain; 1921-1922	Succeeded by Joe Rees
