= Bobby Delahay =

Wales international rugby union footballer

- Born: William James Delahay; 2 September 1900 Bridgend, Wales
- Died: 12 September 1978 (aged 78) Bridgend, Wales
- School: Penybont School

Rugby union career
- Position: Scrum-half
Amateur team(s)
| Years | Team | Apps | (Points) |
| ?-1923 | Bridgend RFC | | |
| 1923-1927 | Cardiff RFC | | |
| 1927-1937 | Torquay Athletic | | |
| – | Devon | | |
International career
| Years | Team | Apps | (Points) |
| 1922–1927 | Wales | 18 | (6) |

William James 'Bobby' Delahay (2 September 1900 – 12 September 1978) was a Welsh international rugby union who played club rugby for Bridgend and Cardiff. Although he played at scrum-half he was also selected for Wales at centre and fly-half.

== Rugby career ==
Delahay first came to prominence as part of Bridgend Rugby Football Club, and played his first eight games for Wales while with the club. Delahay switched to first-class club Cardiff in 1923, and after leaving Cardiff, turned out as a veteran for Torquay Athletic and Devon. In 1924 Delahay was part of the Cardiff team to face the touring All Blacks, and although Cardiff lost 8–16, he scored a memorable try. Delahay captained Cardiff during the 1926/27 season.

=== International rugby career ===
Delahay was first capped for Wales on the 21 January 1922 in a match against England. Delahay was one of eight new caps on the day and Wales beat England easily, scoring eight tries, Delahay scoring one of them. Delahay would be selected for all four games in the 1922 Five Nations Championship, which Wales won, but the next year, again selected for all four games in the competition Delahay was part of the Wales team that came last. In 1923, after his switch to Cardiff, Delahay gave some terrible performances in Welsh trials, and was not selected for the 1924 tournament. After his good game for Cardiff against the All Blacks, he was re-selected to play for Wales against the same touring New Zealanders.

Delahay would play all games in the 1925 and 1926 Five Nations Championships, and in the final game of the 1926 tournament he was selected as Wales captain in the game against France.

International matches played for Wales

- England 1922, 1923, 1925, 1926
- France 1922, 1923, 1925, 1926
- Ireland 1922, 1923, 1925, 1926
- New Zealand 1924
- Scotland 1922, 1923, 1925, 1926, 1927

== Bibliography ==
- Smith, David; Williams, Gareth (1980). Fields of Praise: The Official History of The Welsh Rugby Union. Cardiff: University of Wales Press. ISBN 0-7083-0766-3.
- Thomas, Wayne (1979). A Century of Welsh Rugby Players. Ansells Ltd.
