= R. H. Williams (rugby union) =

British Lions & Wales international rugby union footballer

- Williams in action for the British Lions
- Born: Rhys Haydn Williams; 14 July 1930 Cwmllynfell, Neath Port Talbot, Wales
- Died: 27 January 1993 (aged 62) Whitchurch, Wales
- Height: 6 ft 3 in (1.91 m)
- Weight: 16 st 10 lb (106 kg)
- School: Ystalyfera Grammar School
- University: University College, Cardiff
- Occupation: Education officer

Rugby union career
- Position: Lock
Amateur team(s)
Years	Team	Apps	(Points)
- University College, Cardiff
- Llanelli RFC
- Royal Air Force
- Bristol
1954–59	Barbarian F.C.	23	
International career
Years	Team	Apps	(Points)
1954–1960	Wales	23	(3)
1955–1959	British Lions	10	(0)

Rhys Haydn Williams (14 July 1930 – 27 January 1993), born in Cwmllynfell, was a Welsh rugby union lock forward who gained 23 caps for Wales and ten consecutive caps for the British Lions. At club level he played primarily for Llanelli RFC, captaining them for a season. He also represented the Barbarians becoming the most capped Welsh representative of the club. In his later life he became a sports administrator, including the role of vice-president of the Welsh Rugby Union. Rugby historian John Griffiths described Williams as "the finest line-jumper in the world" and "the most accomplished British lock of the 1950s".

== Personal history ==
Williams was born in the small village of Cwmllynfell in 1930. He was educated at Ystalyfera Grammar School and later matriculated to University College, Cardiff. After graduating he joined the RAF as an education officer. On leaving the forces he later becoming a research chemist for the Steel Company of Wales, and finished his professional career in educational administration as an Assistant Director of Education for Mid Glamorgan. He died in 1993 in Whitchurch, Cardiff.

== Welsh captain, British Lion, Barbarian ==
While in the RAF, Willimas played in the Inter-Services tournament and for Combined Services. He made his debut in club rugby for Llanelli at the age of nineteen, going on to captain the club in the 1957–58 season. He made his debut for Wales in 1954 against Ireland and played at international level until 1960, captaining Wales against England in that year. He played for the British and Irish Lions, going on the 1955 British Lions tour to South Africa and the 1959 British Lions tour to Australia and New Zealand. On these tours he played in ten consecutive test matches. He also toured Canada and South Africa with the Barbarians. Between 1954 and 1959 Williams played 22 matches for the Barbarians, a record number of games for a Welsh player. In the final test against New Zealand in 1959, he won six consecutive line-outs in a critical period of the second half to deny New Zealand the chance to equalise. He was the only forward to be named as 'Player of the Year' in New Zealand during the 1959–1960 season.

Andrew Bennett in his book Welsh Rugby Heroes includes R. H. Williams at No. 4 in his selection of the "all-time greatest" Welsh XV.

== Bibliography ==
- Griffiths, John (1990). British Lions. Swindon: Crowood Press. ISBN 1-85223-541-1.
- Hughes, Gareth (1983). One hundred years of scarlet. Llanelli Rugby Football Club. ISBN 0-9509159-0-4.
- Jenkins, John M.; et al. (1991). Who's Who of Welsh International Rugby Players. Wrexham: Bridge Books. ISBN 1-872424-10-4.
- Thomas, Wayne (1979). A Century of Welsh Rugby Players. Ansells Ltd.
