= Frank Knight Sanders =

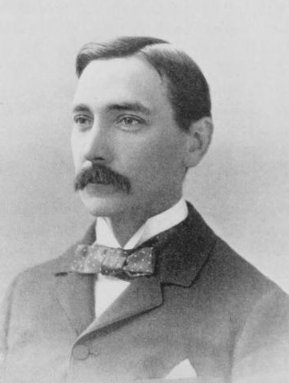
- Born: February 5, 1861; Jaffna, Sri Lanka
- Died: February 20, 1933 (aged 72); Rockport, Massachusetts, US
- Education: Ripon College; Yale University
- Occupation(s): Missionary, theologian, scholar, minister
- Spouse: Edith Blackman (m. 1888)
- Children: 3

Frank Knight Sanders (June 5, 1861 – February 20, 1933) was an American missionary, theologian, scholar and congregational minister.

== Biography ==
He was born in Jaffna, Sri Lanka to American Board of Commissioners for Foreign Missions missionary parents: Rev. Marshall Danworth Sanders (1822-1872), the first president of Jaffna College and his first wife Georgiana Knight (died 1868), daughter of Rev. Asher Knight. Two of his brothers were also ABCFM missionaries: William Henry Sanders (1856-1947) Benguella in Angola and Charles Sylvester (1854-1906) in Anitab, Turkey.

In 1865 his parents returned to the US for a short stay and left him with his uncle.

He was prepared for college in a private academy in Lakeville and in the preparatory department of Ripon College from which he graduated in 1882. He sailed with ABCFM to Ceylon, where he became an instructor in Jaffna College from 1882 to 1886. In 1886 he returned to America and received a Ph.D. from Yale University in 1889 and became instructor in Biblical Literature and Semitic Languages in Yale College until 1891. In 1891 he became the Woolsey Professor of Biblical Literature at Yale Divinity. In 1901 he became Professor of Biblical History and Archaeology and the second Dean of Yale Divinity School - he was ordained as a Congregational minister on January 7, 1902. In 1905 he resigned the deanship and became the secretary of the Congregational Sunday School and Publishing Society at Boston, Mass. until 1908 when he became president of Washburn College. In 1914 he resigned the presidency and became Director of Missionary Preparation for the Foreign Missions Conference of North America until 1927 when he retired.

He married Edith Blackman on June 27, 1888, and they had three children.

Sanders died in Rockport, Massachusetts on February 20, 1933.

== Works ==
- The Messages of the Earlier Prophets (1898)
- Messages of the Later Prophets (1899)
- Outlines for the Study of Biblical History and Literature (1906)
- Historical Notes on the Apostolic Leaders (1907)
- Historical and Expository Notes on the Patriarchs, Kings and Prophets of Israel (1907)
- The Teacher's Life of Christ (1907)
- Studies in the Apostolic Age (1908)
- Messages of the Sages (1912)
- History of the Hebrews (1914)

He was also the editor of the Historical Series for Bible Students, published in nine volumes, and of the Messages of the Bible, in twelve volumes.

He was a regular contributor of weekly articles in the Sunday School Times since 1895.
