= Ivor Jones =

British Lions & Wales international rugby union player (1901–1982)

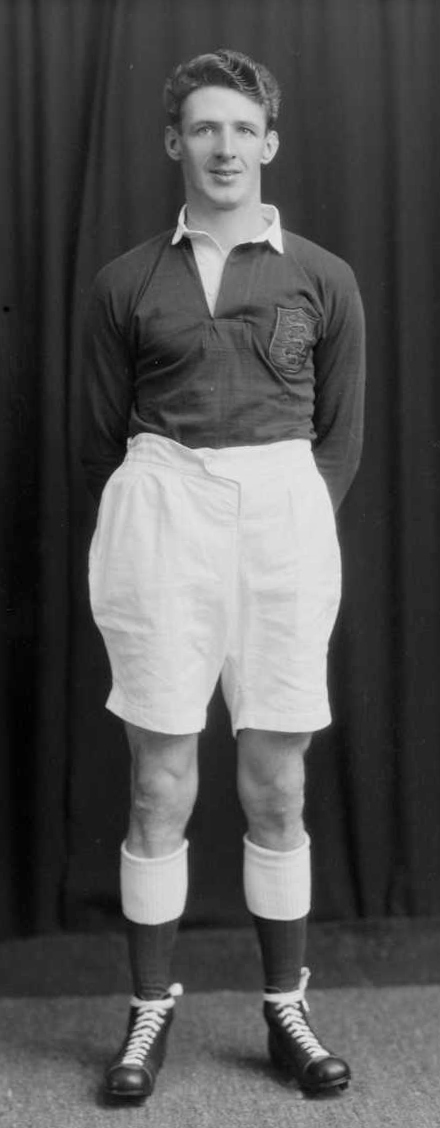
- Jones in New Zealand in 1930
- Born: Ivor Egwad Jones; 10 December 1901 Loughor, Wales
- Died: 16 November 1982 (aged 80) Swansea, Wales

Rugby union career
- Position: Flanker
Amateur team(s)
Years	Team	Apps	(Points)
- Loughor RFC
- Swansea RFC
1922–1938	Llanelli RFC		
International career
Years	Team	Apps	(Points)
1924–1930	Wales	19	(13)
1930	British Lions	5	(2)

Ivor Egwad Jones CBE (10 December 1901 – 16 November 1982) was a Welsh rugby union player who played as a back-row forward, mainly at flanker, for Llanelli and won 19 caps for Wales, three of them as captain.

Jones was born in Loughor and joined Loughor RFC after leaving school, playing his first match for them at the age of 15. After playing a few games for Swansea he moved to Llanelli in 1922. He played for Llanelli until 1938, apart from a short period with Birmingham in 1924–25, and scored more than 1,200 points for the club. He captained Llanelli from 1925 to 1928, 1930 to 1932 and 1933 to 1936, and led them to the Welsh club title three times between 1927 and 1933.

He won his first cap for Wales in 1924 against England and made his last appearance as captain against Scotland in 1930. He was selected for the British and Irish Lions on their tour to Australia and New Zealand in 1930 and played in all five tests. Jones was generally considered to have been one of the outstanding players on that tour, but was never selected for Wales again.

After retiring as a player, Jones became chairman of the Welsh selectors, President of the Welsh Rugby Union and a Justice of the Peace.

Author Peter Jackson said of him:

No Lion, though, made as great an impact on New Zealand as Ivor Jones, the Llanelli back-row forward. They called him 'The King', and a few survivors of the oldest generation scattered around both islands still do. Jones, who devoted a lifetime to the service of Welsh rugby in many guises, including chairman of selectors and president, was almost a one-man team.

Rugby Union Captain
Preceded by Albert Jenkins	Llanelli RFC captain 1925–1928	Succeeded by David Evan John
Preceded by	Llanelli RFC captain 1930–1932	Succeeded by
Preceded by	Llanelli RFC captain 1933–1936	Succeeded by
