= Gwilym Michael =

- Full name: Gwilym Morgan Michael
- Born: 8 July 1892 Ynysmeudwy, Wales
- Died: 24 May 1941 (aged 48) Pontardawe, Wales

Rugby union career
- Position: Forward
International career
Years	Team	Apps	(Points)
1923	Wales	3	(3)

Gwilym Morgan Michael (8 July 1892 – 24 May 1941) was a Welsh international rugby union player.

Michael hailed from Pontardawe in the Swansea Valley and attended Swansea Grammar School.

A fast and versatile forward, Michael played for Swansea RFC and was the club's second top scorer in the 1922-23 season. His three Wales caps all came during their 1923 Five Nations campaign. He also represented a combined England and Wales XV in that's year centenary match at Rugby School.

Michael was a veteran of World War I and served as a Commander of Signals for the Home Guard during World War II. He collapsed and died in 1941 after participating in a parade with his Home Guard unit.

== See also ==
- List of Wales national rugby union players
