= Colloidal fuel =

Emulsion of powdered coal

Colloidal fuel is an emulsion of powdered coal in kerosene or fuel oil. It was used in World War I aboard ships as kerosene supplies ran low.

Development continued after the war, and in 1932 the Cunard liner Scythia made a round-trip transatlantic voyage partly powered by colloidal fuel containing 40% coal. Advantages over oil included cost and energy density. Colloidal fuel is denser than water, which allows it to be stored under water.
