= Norman Gale (rugby union) =

Wales international rugby union footballer

- Born: Norman Reginald Gale; 24 July 1939 Gorseinon, Wales
- Died: 30 January 2005 (aged 65) Llanelli, Wales
- School: Gowerton Grammar School
- Occupation: publican

Rugby union career
- Position: Hooker
Amateur team(s)
Years	Team	Apps	(Points)
- Gorseinon RFC
–	Llanelli RFC		
–	Swansea RFC		
International career
Years	Team	Apps	(Points)
1960–1969	Wales	25	(6)

Norman Gale (24 July 1939 – 30 January 2005) was a Welsh rugby union player. A hooker, he captained the Wales national rugby union team on two occasions in 1967–68. Gale played his club rugby for Llanelli RFC and Swansea RFC, but it was with the Scarlets of Llanelli that he is most associated. He captained Llanelli over two seasons, 1964–65 and 1967–68, and coached the team in the 1973–74 season. Gale earned his place Welsh Rugby history when he became the last Hooker to score a penalty in an international when he kicked one against New Zealand in 1967.
