= Idris Jones (chemist) =

Welsh chemist & Wales international rugby union player (1900–1971)

- Born: Walter Idris Jones; 18 January 1900 Llanelli, Wales
- Died: 5 July 1971 (aged 71) Llandaff, Wales
- University: Aberystwyth University; Cambridge University
- Notable relative(s): Lord Elwyn-Jones, brother
- Occupation: Industrial chemist

Rugby union career
- Position: Flanker
Senior career
Years	Team	Apps	(Points)
–	London Welsh		
–	Llanelli		
International career
Years	Team	Apps	(Points)
1924–1925	Wales	4	(3)
–	Barbarians		

Walter Idris Jones CBE (18 January 1900 – 5 July 1971) was a Welsh industrial chemist and international rugby union player. He captained the Wales national rugby union team on one occasion in 1925. Jones played his club rugby for Llanelli RFC.

== Private life and education ==
Jones was born in Llanelli on 18 January 1900, the son of Frederick and Elizabeth Jones. His father worked in the tinplate industry. He was the brother of the politician Lord Elwyn-Jones.

Jones won a scholarship to the University College of Wales, Aberystwyth, where he graduated in chemistry in 1921. He then studied at Gonville and Caius College, Cambridge, where in 1925 he obtained a PhD for research in organic chemistry.

Idris Jones died in Llandaff on 5 July 1971 and was unmarried.

== Rugby union ==
Jones captained Aberystwyth University Rugby Club (1919–1922) and played for Cambridge University (1923–1925). He played for London Welsh and Llanelli and for the Barbarians invitation team. He made four appearances for Wales in 1924 and 1925, scoring one try, and was captain in the Ireland v Wales match in Belfast on 14 March 1925.

== Career ==
In 1926, Jones joined the research staff of Imperial Chemical Industries in Billingham, County Durham. In 1933, he returned to Wales as Research Manager for the Powell Duffryn Coal Company, where he developed 'Phurnacite' smokeless coal briquettes and worked on the manufacturing process for colloidal fuel.

On the nationalisation of the British coal industry in 1946, Jones was invited to set up and lead the scientific service, becoming Director General of Research Development (Coal Processing and Combustion) at the National Coal Board.

He retired from the National Coal Board in 1963, due to ill health. In retirement he was a part-time member of the Wales Gas Board, a vice-president the University College of Wales, Aberystwyth, and chairman of its appointments board. He served on the Central Advisory Council for Education in Wales. He was President of the Aberystwyth Old Students' Association in 1965–66.

== Honours ==
- Fellow of the Chemical Society
- Fellow of the Institute of Fuel
- Fellow of the Royal Institute of Chemistry
- Fellow of the Royal Society of Arts
- CBE (1954)
- Hon. DSc, University of Wales (1957)

Professional and academic associations
Preceded by Sir William John Pugh	President of the Aberystwyth Old Students' Association; 1965–66	Succeeded by Dr Elwyn Davies
