= Jack Whitfield =

- Born: John James Whitfield; 23 March 1892 Newport, Monmouthshire
- Died: 26 December 1927 (aged 35) Newport, Monmouthshire
- Height: 5 ft 11 in (180 cm)
- Weight: 13 st 8 lb (190 lb; 86 kg)
- Occupation(s): Fitter publican

Rugby union career
- Position: Hooker
Amateur team(s)
Years	Team	Apps	(Points)
?-1919	Pill Harriers RFC		
1920-1926	Newport RFC		
–	Monmouthshire		
International career
Years	Team	Apps	(Points)
1919–1924	Wales	12	(15)

Jack Whitfield (23 March 1892 – 26 December 1927) was a Welsh international rugby union hooker who played club rugby for Newport and club rugby for Monmouthshire. He was an extremely powerful scrummager, but was not seen as skillful as the pre-war players produced by Wales.

== Rugby career ==
As a fitter in the Newport Docks, local dock team Pill Harriers was a natural choice to take on the front row skills of Whitfield. The Harriers, although seen as a lower league team, provided many Welsh players, especially front row hardmen like Whitfield. In 1919 he was selected for the Wales to face the touring New Zealand Services team. Over the next five years, now as a member of the Newport club, Whitfield was capped for Wales on 12 occasions and scored his first try on the 13 March 1920 against Ireland. In the 1922 Five Nations Championship, Whitfield was the leading try scorer of the tournament with four tries one against England and France, and two against Ireland. In the 1924 Championship, in a game against Scotland, Whitfield was given the captaincy for Wales. Wales lost the match heavily, with Scotland running in eight tries, it was Whitfield's only time as captain.

He died on Boxing Day 1927 at the Royal Gwent Hospital after a gastric ulcer operation.

International matches played Wales

- England 1920, 1921, 1922
- France 1920, 1922
- Ireland 1920, 1922, 1924
- New Zealand New Zealand Services 1919
- Scotland 1920, 1922, 1924

== Bibliography ==
- Smith, David; Williams, Gareth (1980). Fields of Praise: The Official History of The Welsh Rugby Union. Cardiff: University of Wales Press. ISBN 0-7083-0766-3.
