= Carston Catcheside =

England international rugby union player

Carston Catheside
- Born: Howard Carston Catcheside; 18 August 1899 Sunderland, England
- Died: 10 May 1987 (aged 87) Wandsworth, England
- School: Oundle School

Rugby union career
- Position: Wing
Senior career
Years	Team	Apps	(Points)
- Percy Park
–	Northumberland		
International career
Years	Team	Apps	(Points)
1924-1927	England	8	(18)

Howard Carston Catcheside OBE (18 August 1899 – 10 May 1987) was an English rugby union player. He was nicknamed 'Catchy'. He won eight caps for England and in his later life became a rugby administrator.

== Personal history ==
Catheside was born in Sunderland, England in 1899. He was educated at Oundle School in Northampton. With the outbreak of First World War, Catcheside served in the British Army where posted to the Royal Field Artillery, reaching the rank of second-lieutenant. He served his country again in the Second World War, once more in the Royal Field Artillery, where he was lieutenant-colonel. He received the OBE for military duties in 1945.

== Rugby career ==
Catcheside came to prominence as a rugby player while playing at wing for Percy Park, the team he would represent throughout his entire international career. He was also selected at county level and represented Northumberland.

He made his England debut on 19 January 1924 against Wales. That year he became the first player to score a try in each round of the then Five nations championship, with two tries coming against Wales. His final game for England came against Scotland on 10 March 1927.

Between 1932 and 1940 he was honorary treasurer of the Northumberland Rugby Union and from 1936 until 1962 he was a selector for the Rugby Football Union (RFU). In 1951 he was made chairman of the RFU, a post he held until 1962.
