= Ernie Gardner =

England international rugby union player

- Full name: Ernest Robert Gardner
- Born: 6 October 1886 Cardiff, Wales
- Died: 26 January 1952 (aged 65) Keyham, Devon, England

Rugby union career
- Position: Hooker
International career
| Years | Team | Apps | (Points) |
| 1921–23 | England | 10 | (3) |

Ernest Robert Gardner (6 October 1886 – 26 January 1952) was an English international rugby union player.

Born in Cardiff, Gardner served in the Royal Navy and won his England call up in 1921 while playing his rugby with Devonport Services. He was a hooker in England's 1921 and 1923 Five Nations grand slam-winning teams. In addition to Devon, Gardner played representative rugby for Cornwall during a period when he was stationed there.

== See also ==
- List of England national rugby union players
