= Reg Edwards (rugby union) =

England international rugby union player

- Full name: Edmund Reginald Edwards
- Born: 1887 Wales
- Died: 9 May 1951 (aged 63) Montreal, Canada

Rugby union career
- Position: Prop
International career
Years	Team	Apps	(Points)
1921–25	England	11	(3)

Edmund Reginald Edwards (1887 – 1951) was a Welsh-born English international rugby union player.

Originally from Pontypool, Edwards went to school in England, but played his rugby back in Wales with Newport, which he debuted for in the 1909-10 season. He was a prop and made over 200 appearances for Newport, including two seasons as captain after the war. Prior to his England call up, Edwards unsuccessfully attended Welsh trials.

Edwards, a butcher by trade, gained 11 England caps in the early 1920s. This included all four matches of their 1921 Five Nations grand slam, as well as participation in further grand slam successes in 1923 and 1924. His last match, against the "Invincible" All Blacks at Twickenham in 1925, is remembered for the historic sending off of New Zealand forward Cyril Brownlie, an incident Edwards was involved in. Brownlie was accused by the referee of kicking a player on the ground, although the All Blacks argued denied this.

== See also ==
- List of England national rugby union players
