= Joe Rees (rugby union, born 1893) =

Wales international rugby union player (1893–1950)

- Born: Joseph Rees; 3 June 1893
- Died: 12 April 1950 (aged 56) Swansea, Wales
- Notable relative(s): William "Billo" Rees, brother

Rugby union career
- Position: Fullback
Amateur team(s)
Years	Team	Apps	(Points)
- Amman United RFC
- Ammanford RFC
1919–?	Swansea RFC		
International career
Years	Team	Apps	(Points)
1920–1924	Wales	12	(7)

Joseph Rees (3 June 1893 – 12 April 1950) was a Welsh international rugby union full-back who played club rugby for Swansea. Rees made his debut for Swansea in 1919 and captained his club in the 1922/23 season. Rees would play 12 times for Wales, and captained them on one occasion. His brother, William "Billo" Rees, was a rugby league footballer who played for Wales and the Great Britain team, and toured Australia.

== International rugby career ==
In 1920 Rees was selected to play against England at St Helens. It was a ground-breaking game that saw Newport's Jerry Shea score 16 points and become the first person to achieve an international rugby 'Full House', of all four scoring types. Rees played all four games in the 1920 Five Nations Championship in which Wales won the competition. After playing three games in the 1921 tournament Rees was selected for the opening game in 1922 against England. During this game Rees scored his first points in a Welsh shirt when he converted two tries; though as Wales scored eight tries the return could have been better. Rees managed a penalty goal against France in 1923, which was the last score he would achieve for Wales . The next year, in his last game for Wales against England, Rees was given the captaincy of Wales. Wales lost the game 17–9.

=== International matches played ===
Wales

- England 1920, 1921, 1922, 1923, 1924
- France 1920, 1923
- Ireland 1920, 1921, 1923
- Scotland 1920, 1921

== Bibliography ==
- Smith, David; Williams, Gareth (1980). Fields of Praise: The Official History of The Welsh Rugby Union. Cardiff: University of Wales Press. ISBN 0-7083-0766-3.

Rugby Union Captain
Preceded by Dick Huxtable	Swansea RFC Captain; 1922-1923	Succeeded by Frank Palmer
