= Albert Jenkins (rugby union) =

Wales international rugby union player

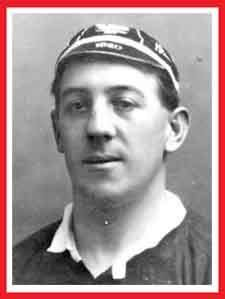
- Born: Albert Edward Jenkins; 11 March 1895 Llanelli, Wales
- Died: 7 October 1953 (aged 58) Llanelli, Wales
- Height: 5 ft 9 in (175 cm)
- Weight: 12 st 8 lb (176 lb; 80 kg)
- School: Lakefield Primary Llanelli

Rugby union career
- Position: Centre
Amateur team(s)
| Years | Team | Apps | (Points) |
- Seaside Stars
| 1919–1932 | Llanelli RFC | | |
International career
| Years | Team | Apps | (Points) |
| 1920–1928 | Wales | 14 | (47) |

Albert Jenkins (11 March 1895 – 7 October 1953) was an international rugby player for Wales and played club rugby for Llanelli RFC between 1919 and 1928. Jenkins was one of the greatest backs to have played for Llanelli and is compared to later Scarlet heroes Lewis Jones and Phil Bennett. Jenkins was a strong tackler and was an extremely fast runner from a standing start. He was also an excellent kicker with either foot and could punt the ball half the length of the pitch. He was sometimes criticised for his decision making on the field, and wasn't at his best away from Stradey Park.

In the book Stradey Stories, author Alun Wyn Bevan comments, "such was his drawing power that if by some quirk of fate, Albert could not take to the field because of injury or work commitment (he was a steelworker), the fans would leave the stadium in droves and not bother to watch the ensuing match."

Jenkins is seen as one of Llanelli's greatest players but he was at his peak when Welsh rugby was at one of its lowest points in its history.

== Club career ==
Jenkins played for Llanelli juniors until World War I started. On his return in 1919, Jenkins rejoined Llanelli and gained a position in the senior team. He would later play for Llanelli against the New Zealand All Blacks, losing in 1924, but beating them 3–0 in 1926

== Career in the Army ==
On the outbreak of the First World War, Jenkins joined the British Army and served in France in the 38th Welsh Regiment, where he fought in the Battle of the Somme, Battle of Ypres and Battle of Épehy.

== International career ==
Jenkins played fourteen matches for Wales, his first cap was against England on 14 January 1920 just four months after his Llanelli debut. His most well known international was the game against Ireland in 1920 when Jenkins set up three tries for teammate Bryn Williams, scored a try himself, kicked two of the resulting conversions and was successful with a drop goal attempt.

Jenkins would go on to captain Wales twice, his first against Ireland in 1923, losing both games.

In 1950 a tribute match was held in his honour at Stradey Park.

Jenkins died on 7 October 1953 and was buried at Box cemetery, Llanelli. Norman Lewis of Llanelli wrote "Jenkins seemed to youthful eyes a mystical figure imbued with powers the rest could only dream about"

=== International matches played ===
Wales

- England 1920, 1923
- France 1920, 1921, 1922, 1923
- Ireland 1920, 1923, 1928
- Scotland 1920, 1921, 1923, 1928
- New Zealand 1924

== Bibliography ==
- Smith, David; Williams, Gareth (1980). Fields of Praise: The Official History of The Welsh Rugby Union. Cardiff: University of Wales Press. ISBN 0-7083-0766-3.
- Thomas, Wayne (1979). A Century of Welsh Rugby Players. Ansells Ltd.

Rugby Union Captain
| Preceded by Dai Hiddlestone | Llanelli RFC Captain; 1919-1920 | Succeeded by Bryn S. Evans |
| Preceded by Bryn S. Evans | Llanelli RFC Captain; 1921-1922 | Succeeded by Bryn S. Evans |
| Preceded by Bryn S. Evans | Llanelli RFC Captain; 1923-1925 | Succeeded by Ivor Jones |
