= 1925 Five Nations Championship =

Rugby union competition

- Date: 24 January - 18 April 1925
- Countries: England; France; Ireland; Scotland; Wales

Tournament statistics
- Champions: Scotland (8th title)
- Grand Slam: Scotland (1st title)
- Triple Crown: Scotland (6th title)
- Matches played: 10

The 1925 Five Nations Championship was the eleventh series of the rugby union Five Nations Championship following the inclusion of France into the Home Nations Championship. Including the previous Home Nations Championships, this was the thirty-eighth series of the annual northern hemisphere rugby union championship. Ten matches were played between 24 January and 18 April. It was contested by England, France, Ireland, Scotland and Wales.

Scotland's Johnnie Wallace scored a try against each other country in this tournament, repeating the achievement of Carston Catcheside of England the previous year. It would be 58 years before another player recorded such a feat, and 74 years before another Scottish player did it again.

== Table ==
Pos	Team	Pld	W	D	L	PF	PA	PD	Pts
1	Scotland	4	4	0	0	77	37	+40	8
2	Ireland	4	2	1	1	42	26	+16	5
2	England	4	2	1	1	42	37	+5	5
4	Wales	4	1	0	3	34	60	−26	2
5	France	4	0	0	4	23	58	−35	0

== Results ==
1925-01-01

France	3–9	Ireland

Stade Yves-du-Manoir, Paris

1925-02-14

England	12–6	Wales

London

1925-02-21

Scotland	25–4	France

Edinburgh (Note: Last match at Inverleith.)
Attendance: 20,000

1925-02-28

Wales	14–24	Scotland

Swansea

1925-02-28

England	6–6	Ireland

London

1925-03-07

Wales	11–5	France

Cardiff

1925-02-28

Ireland	8–14	Scotland

Dublin

1925-03-14

Ireland	19–3	Wales

Belfast

1925-03-21

Scotland	14–11	England

Edinburgh (Note: First match at Murrayfield.)
Attendance: 70,000

1925-04-18

France	11–13	England

Paris
