= Steve Morris (rugby union) =

Wales international rugby union player

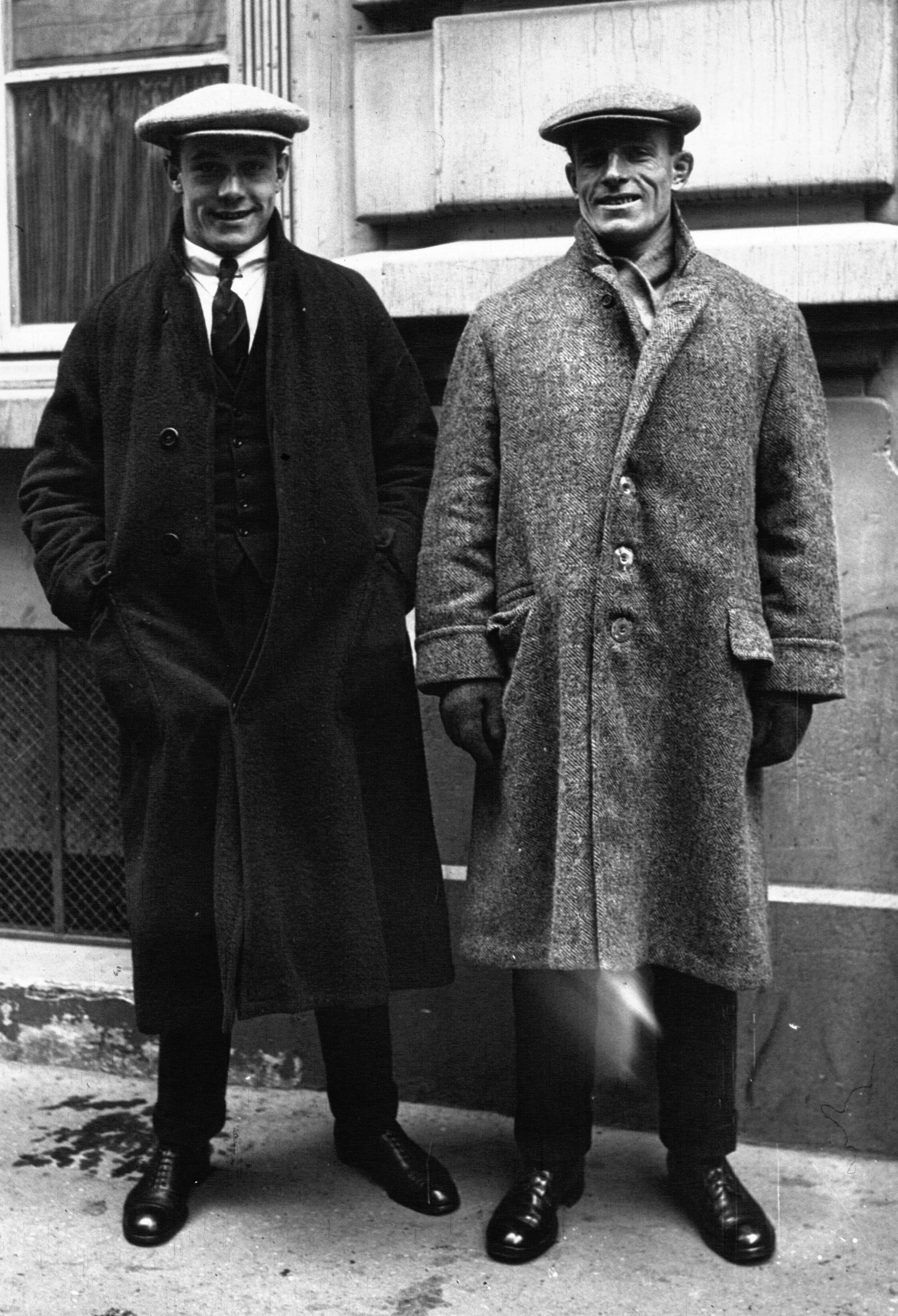
- Steve Morris (on the left) with Tom Parker.
- Born: Stephen Morris; 1 September 1896 Newport Wales
- Died: 29 May 1965 (aged 68) Newport, Wales
- Height: 6 ft (183 cm)
- Weight: 14 st 3 lb (199 lb; 90 kg)
- Occupation: miner

Rugby union career
- Position: Flanker
Amateur team(s)
Years	Team	Apps	(Points)
–	Cross Keys RFC		
International career
Years	Team	Apps	(Points)
1920-1925	Wales	19	(0)

Steve Morris (1 September 1896 – 29 May 1965) was a Welsh international rugby union flanker who played club rugby for Cross Keys. A hard man, Morris was extremely physical in the way he played the game, sometimes over physical and he was unafraid to turn to violence if it was warranted. It is reported that he once knocked out a Welsh heavyweight boxing champion in a sparring session. At 6 foot and over 14 stone in weight, Morris was a hulking player, but he was still recognised as a cheerful and genial person.

A coal miner by profession, Morris would work down the pit at Risca Colliery on a Saturday morning and then turn out to play for Cross Keys in the afternoon. Morris spent his entire playing career at Cross Keys and later became the club's chairman. On his death his ashes were scattered at Pandy Park, the team's home ground.

== Club career ==
Morris began playing rugby before the outbreak of World War I and continued playing when he could as a recruit in the British Army. After returning to Wales he turned out for Cross Keys in April 1919 against the touring New Zealand Army XV. Twelve years later, Morris was still turning out for his club and in 1931 he was part of the joint Abertillery / Cross Keys team that faced the touring South African team. Morris was extremely loyal to Cross Keys, never the most fashionable of rugby clubs, and on one occasion it is said he turned down a £1,000 contract to turn to rugby league.

== International career ==
Morris made his international debut against England in 1920, the first Cross Keys player to represent his country. In the game against France in 1920, Morris played alongside his Cross Keys team mate, Fred Reeves, made all the more special as the two of them were also co-workers at the Risca Colliery. Morris gained 19 caps in total and should have gained more but missed the Ireland match after being sent off in a club game. Morris's aggression was used to good effect in other games; when in 1923 against an overly violent French team he and Swansea's Tom Parker were called upon to fight back to subdue their opponents. In his penultimate game against France at St. Helens in Swansea, Morris was given the captaincy of Wales, but the team suffered a fairly heavy defeat even after a late Welsh surge masterminded by their new captain.

=== International matches played ===
Wales

- England 1920, 1922, 1923, 1924, 1925
- France 1920, 1922, 1923, 1924, 1925
- Ireland 1920, 1922, 1923
- New Zealand 1924
- Scotland 1920, 1922, 1923, 1924, 1925

== Bibliography ==
- Parry-Jones, David (1999). Prince Gwyn, Gwyn Nicholls and the First Golden Era of Welsh Rugby. Bridgend: seren. ISBN 1-85411-262-7.
- Smith, David; Williams, Gareth (1980). Fields of Praise: The Official History of The Welsh Rugby Union. Cardiff: University of Wales Press. ISBN 0-7083-0766-3.
- Thomas, Wayne (1979). A Century of Welsh Rugby Players. Ansells Ltd.
