= 1924 Five Nations Championship =

Rugby union competition

- Date: 1 January - 27 March 1924
- Countries: England; France; Ireland; Scotland; Wales

Tournament statistics
- Champions: England (9th title)
- Grand Slam: England (5th title)
- Triple Crown: England (8th title)
- Matches played: 10

The 1924 Five Nations Championship was the tenth series of the rugby union Five Nations Championship following the inclusion of France into the Home Nations Championship. Including the previous Home Nations Championships, this was the thirty-seventh series of the annual northern hemisphere rugby union championship. Ten matches were played between 1 January and 27 March. It was contested by England, France, Ireland, Scotland and Wales.

Carston Catcheside, the England winger, became the first player to score a try against each other team in the five nations. Until the tournament became the 6 nations in 2000, only four other players managed this achievement, Johnnie Wallace (Scotland 1925), Patrick Estève (France 1983), Philippe Sella (France 1986) and Gregor Townsend (Scotland 1999).

== Table ==
Pos	Team	Pld	W	D	L	PF	PA	PD	Pts
1	England	4	4	0	0	69	19	+50	8
2	Scotland	4	2	0	2	58	49	+9	4
2	Ireland	4	2	0	2	30	37	−7	4
4	France	4	1	0	3	25	45	−20	2
4	Wales	4	1	0	3	39	71	−32	2

== Results ==
1924-01-01

France	12–10	Scotland

Paris

1924-01-19

Wales	9–17	England

Swansea

1924-01-26

Ireland	6–0	France

Dublin

1924-02-02

Scotland	35–10	Wales

Edinburgh

1924-02-09

Ireland	3–14	England

Belfast

1924-02-23

England	19–7	France

Twickenham

1924-02-23

Scotland	13–8	Ireland

Edinburgh

1924-03-08

Wales	10–13	Ireland

Cardiff

1924-03-15

England	19–0	Scotland

London

1924-03-27

France	6–10	Wales

Paris
