= Frank Palmer (rugby union) =

Welsh rugby union player

Frank Cyril Palmer (26 June 1896, Swansea - 16 October 1925 (aged 29), Swansea) was a Welsh rugby union player. He played for the Wales rugby union team.
