= Tom Parker (rugby union) =

Wales international rugby union footballer

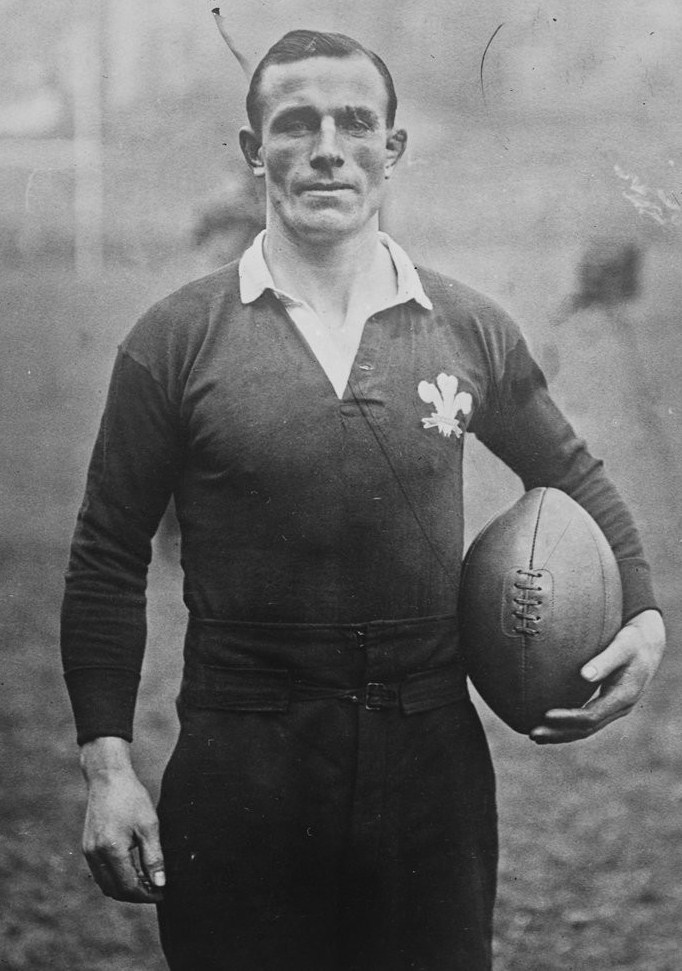
- Tom Parker, 1923
- Born: Thomas Parker; 29 March 1891 Llansamlet, Wales
- Died: 25 November 1967 (aged 76) Tredegar, Wales
- Notable relative(s): Dai Parker, brother

Rugby union career
- Position: Flanker
Amateur team(s)
Years	Team	Apps	(Points)
1913–1923	Swansea RFC		
International career
Years	Team	Apps	(Points)
1919–1923	Wales	15	(6)

Thomas Parker (29 March 1891 – 25 November 1967) was a Welsh international rugby union flanker who played club rugby for Swansea. Parker made his debut for Swansea in 1913 and captained his club in the 1920/21 season Parker would play 15 times for Wales, seven of them as captain. He was surprisingly one of the most successful captains in the history of Welsh rugby with 6 wins and 1 draw, all played during the 1920s, a decade that is seen as the worst period in Welsh rugby.

== International rugby career ==
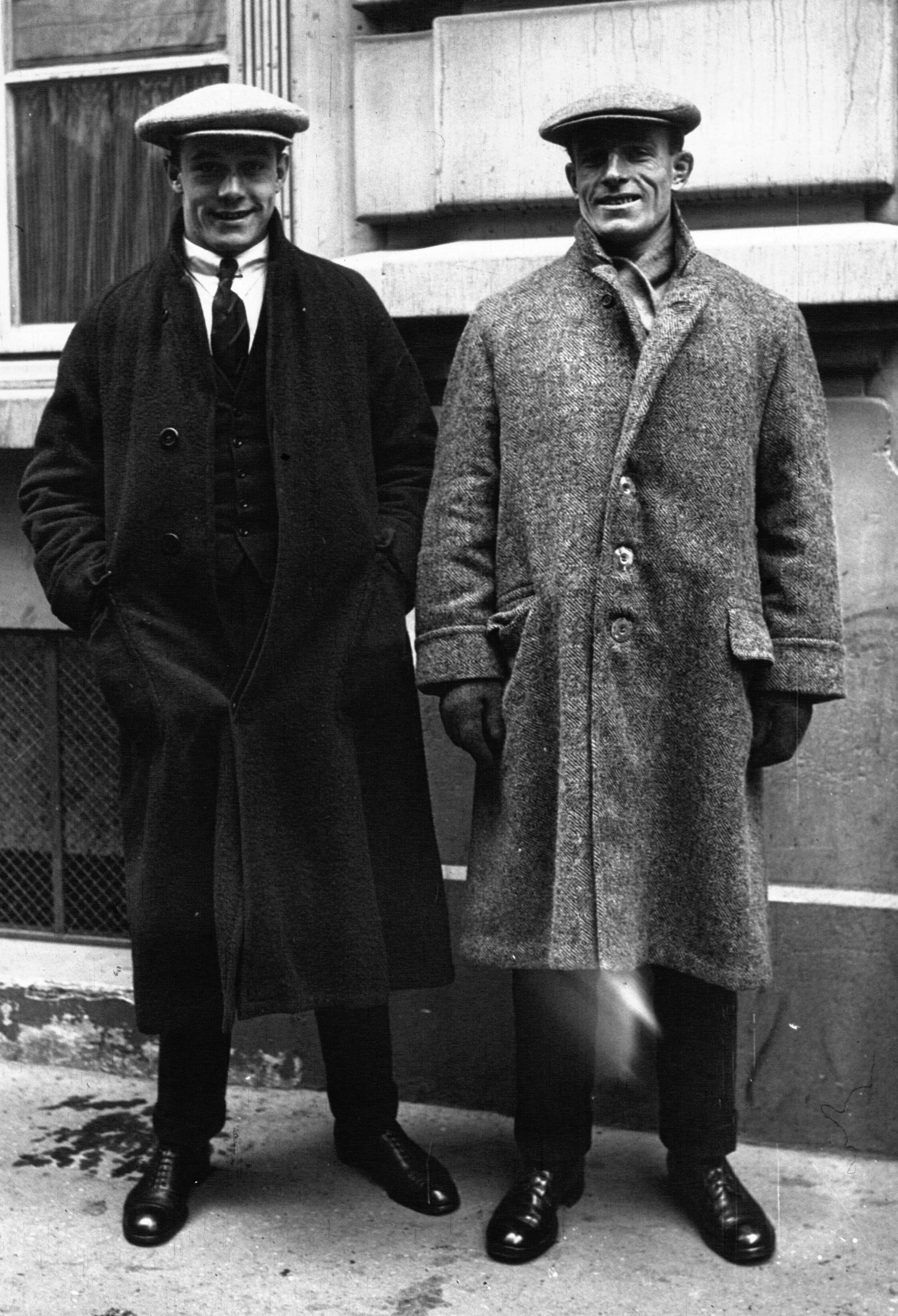
Tom Parker with Steve Morris

Unusual for a new international, Parker gained his first cap against a touring side. In 1919 Parker was chosen to play against the New Zealand Army XV, and the next season would face all the home nations. His first game against England saw a Welsh team filled with new caps, so it was an impressive win when Wales beat their rivals 19–5, with Jerry Shea scoring 16 of the points. Parker's first international try came in 1920 in a match against Ireland at the Cardiff Arms Park. One of Parker's more memorable matches came in 1923 against France when, along with Steve Morris of Cross Keys, he spent large parts of the game fighting against an overly violent French squad.

=== International matches played ===
Wales

- England 1920, 1921, 1922, 1923
- France 1921, 1922, 1923
- Ireland 1920, 1921, 1922
- New Zealand Army XV 1919
- Scotland 1920, 1921, 1922, 1923

== Bibliography ==
- Smith, David; Williams, Gareth (1980). Fields of Praise: The Official History of The Welsh Rugby Union. Cardiff: University of Wales Press. ISBN 0-7083-0766-3.

Rugby Union Captain
Preceded by Howell Lewis	Swansea RFC Captain; 1920-1921	Succeeded by Dick Huxtable
