= Llanelli RFC =

Welsh rugby union club, based in Llanelli

(Wales) Llanelli RFC
- Union: Welsh Rugby Union
- Nickname(s): Bois Sospan, Turks
- Founded: 1872; 154 years ago
- Location: Llanelli, Wales
- Ground: Parc y Scarlets (Capacity: 14,870)
- Coach: Paul Fisher
- League: Welsh Premier Division
- 2022–23: 12th
1st kit	2nd kit

Official website
- www.llanellirfc.co.uk/Home/Page

Llanelli Rugby Football Club (Welsh: Clwb Rygbi Llanelli) was a Welsh rugby union club founded on 30 March 1872.

The club's historic home ground was Stradey Park in Llanelli, but they moved in 2008 to the new Parc y Scarlets in adjacent Pemberton. The club song is "Sosban Fach", a Welsh song meaning "Little Saucepan", which is sometimes sung by the club's fans during matches as the club anthem. The team colours are scarlet and white.

Following the 2003 regionalisation of Welsh rugby, Llanelli became a feeder club to the Scarlets regional team. Following the 2022-23 season, the club was disbanded.

== Club history ==
=== In the beginning ===
After attending a Good Friday service in chapel, a group of young athletes from Llanelli met to discuss the formation of a new rugby club in the area. One of those men was John D. Rogers, a young industrialist who had learned to play rugby union football at Rugby School, the game's birthplace. He was assisted by C. Hilton, who became the club's inaugural honorary secretary. On Easter Saturday, 30 March 1872, the group reconvened to confirm the formation of Llanelli RFC. However, due to a lack of opposition and the limitations of transport at that time, no other town club was within a suitable travelling distance until 1875–76.

The club used People's Park in Llanelli for practice. The playing kit was dark blue, with high-collared jerseys and tight trousers that reached well below the knee, and blue caps.

Up until then Llanelli and Neath were the only first-class clubs in Wales (Neath being one year older).

=== The early years ===
Llanelli's first recorded match was against Carmarthen Quins, on 21 December 1875 at People's Park. Unfortunately, the match had to be abandoned due to bad weather and the result is recorded as a 0–0 draw. The club's second fixture, at the same venue on 1 January 1876, was against Cambrian Club, a team based in Swansea. Two days later they played their first away fixture, against Carmarthen Quins at Picton Court, Carmarthen. This was followed by a match at Felinfoel against Swansea RFC on 5 February 1876.

Arthur Buchanan had the honour of being the first captain of Llanelli RFC. He died prematurely after accidentally shooting himself.

In September 1879, it was announced that the club were to move from People's Park, having acquired the Stradey cricket ground for their practices and matches. The first official match played at the new home was against Neath in the Challenge Cup on 29 November 1879.

A further kit change saw Llanelli RFC play in black before the team colours changed to rose and primrose stripes for the 1882/1883 season. In 1883/84, they changed again to red and chocolate quarters. However, on Easter Monday, 14 April 1884, the Llanelli team took the field in scarlet jerseys, complete with scarlet gold-braided caps. The occasion was the visit of the full Irish team, which had played Wales on the previous Saturday and stopped off on their way home. From that date, the scarlet jersey became permanent and Llanelli RFC became known throughout the rugby world as The Scarlets. Nearly 120 years later, the club's nickname also became the name of the regional team, Scarlets.

=== The Scarlets ===
Llanelli's first major trophies came in 1884 and 1886 with the South Wales Challenge Cup, the forerunner of the modern Welsh Cup. December 1888 saw the team beat a touring New Zealand Natives team by 3–0, with a dropped goal from Harry Bowen. The team claimed their first full international scalp in 1908 when they beat Australia 8–3. This would be the first of many famous victories over touring international sides. Players who wore the Scarlet jersey in this pre-war era included Albert Jenkins, who scored over 121 tries for the club as a centre.

After the war Lewis Jones was one of the stars of the game. He was capped by Wales aged just 18 in 1950, and was instrumental in their Grand Slam win that year. However just two years later, he switched codes from the then amateur rugby union to the professional rugby league and signed for Leeds for a then record amount of £6,000.

Success was, however, not away from Stradey for long. A victory over Australia came in 1967 and the club was about to enter what many would argue was its strongest era. Players at Llanelli during the 1970s included Ray Gravell, Gareth Jenkins, Delme Thomas, Phil Bennett, and Derek Quinnell; and the team was coached by Carwyn James and assisted by former captain and Wales international hooker Norman Gale.

=== The day the pubs ran dry ===
"9–3" is a poem by Welsh comedian and singer Max Boyce and refers to the match between Llanelli and the New Zealand All Blacks at Stradey Park in front of 26,000 supporters on 31 October 1972. Llanelli took a 6–0 lead through a converted try but New Zealand struck back to make it 6–3. A long distance Andy Hill penalty ensured Llanelli emerged victors by 9–3 and the crowd famously ran onto the pitch at the end and carried off players such as Delme Thomas. The poem is best known for the line "The day the pubs ran dry", as huge celebrations followed and many pubs in the town sold out of all alcoholic drinks.

=== Cup success ===
The next notable period for Llanelli RFC was during the late 1980s and early 1990s. With players such as Ieuan Evans amongst the squad, Llanelli won the Welsh Cup five times in eight years between 1985 and 1993 including in consecutive seasons in 1991, 1992 and 1993. They achieved their most recent success against international opponents when they beat Australia, the world champions at the time, in 1992. Rupert Moon was captain when they won the cup and league which earned Llanelli the title of Best Team in Britain for the 1992–1993 season as well as the nickname "Cup Kings of Wales" due to their success in the Welsh Cup. The late 1990s and early years of the 21st century also produced many Welsh internationals including Rupert Moon, Ricky Evans, Wayne Proctor, Scott Quinnell and Stephen Jones.

The side reached the semi-finals of the Heineken Cup three times: in 2000 against Northampton Saints who went on to win the trophy, in 2002 against Leicester Tigers and in 2007 against Leicester Tigers again. In the first match against Leicester, Llanelli appeared to be going to their first final as they led 12–10 in injury time. But Leicester were awarded a penalty 8 metres inside their own half; Tim Stimpson's kick for goal bounced off both the post and crossbar before just falling over the post to deny Llanelli.

Prior to the regional era, Llanelli RFC were considered the third most successful team in European club rugby, having played the third largest number of games (behind Toulouse and Munster) in the Heineken Cup due to the club's consistency in qualifying for the knockout stages of the tournament. However, they have never won the competition.

=== The regional era ===
Top-level professional rugby changed at Llanelli RFC in 2003 when Llanelli's first team was rebranded, as part of the WRU's move to five professional teams, as Llanelli Scarlets and Llanelli RFC became the club's premiership brand. The Llanelli RFC team now plays in the Welsh Premier Division and Welsh Cup. Under coach Scott Quinnell they won the cup in 2005, their first silverware in their new format.

On 28 March 2023, Llanelli RFC announced their withdrawal from the Premier Division for the 2023–24 season, as they would be unable to field a team in the expanded league. Llanelli RFC would instead seek to arrange friendlies as a development side for the Scarlets, and look to join a proposed eight–team league above the Premier Division.

Llanelli did not join the new competition, Super Rygbi Cymru, with Carmarthen Quins and Llandovery representing the Scarlets region. Funding was no longer allocated to the side and the team was disbanded, with players allocated elsewhere.

=== Match traditions ===
As a link to the club's team anthem Sosban Fach, there were sosbenni on top of the uprights of both sets of posts at Stradey Park. The saucepans were installed at Parc y Scarlets.

Whenever Llanelli RFC played Bath, it was tradition that a rag doll was hung from the crossbar, which the winning team then kept until their next encounter. Llanelli RFC last won the doll in 2002. Since 2003 this tradition has been continued by the regional side, who successfully retained the doll when they played Bath in the Powergen Cup semi-final in 2006.

== Ground ==
The Scarlets play at Parc y Scarlets in Pemberton. From 1879 to 2008 they played at Stradey Park in Llanelli. Planning for the new stadium began in 2004.

== Club honours ==
- Welsh Premier Division: 1992–93, 1998–99, 2001–02, 2010–11
- Welsh Cup: 1973, 1974, 1975, 1976, 1985, 1988, 1991, 1992, 1993, 1998, 2000, 2003, 2005, 2010
- Snelling Sevens: 1960, 1971, 1973, 1979, 1988

== British and Irish Lions ==
The following former players were selected for the British and Irish Lions touring squads while playing for Llanelli RFC.

- (Wales) Phil Bennett 1974, 1977
- (Wales) Roy Bergiers 1974
- (Wales) Bill Clement 1938
- (Wales) Tommy David 1974
- (Wales) Ieuan Evans 1989, 1993, 1997
- (Wales) Ray Gravell 1980
- (Wales) Dafydd James 2001
- (Wales) Elvet Jones 1938
- (Wales) Ivor Jones 1930
- (Wales) Lewis Jones 1950
- (Wales) Robin McBryde 2001
- (Wales) Peter Morgan 1980
- (Wales) Terry Price 1966
- (Wales) Derek Quinnell 1971, 1977, 1980
- (Wales) Scott Quinnell 1993, 2001
- (Wales) Keith Rowlands 1962
- (Wales) Alun Thomas 1955, 1974 (manager)
- (Wales) Delme Thomas 1966, 1971
- (Wales) J. J. Williams 1974, 1977
- (Wales) R. H. Williams 1955, 1959

== Wales International Captains ==
The following former players captained the Wales national rugby union team while playing for Llanelli RFC.

See also Wales rugby union captains

- Willie Thomas 1891
- Rev J Alban Davies 1914
- Albert Jenkins 1923–1928
- Idris Jones 1925
- Ivor Jones 1927–30
- R. H. Williams 1960
- Onllwyn Brace 1960–61
- Terry Davies 1960–61
- Norman Gale 1967–68
- Delme Thomas 1972
- Phil Bennett 1977–78
- David Pickering 1986–87
- Jonathan Davies 1987–88
- Ieuan Evans 1991–95
- Nigel Davies 1996
- Scott Quinnell 2000–02
- Stephen Jones 2003–07

== Other notable former Llanelli players ==
Former Llanelli RFC players who have at some time represented Wales or toured with the British Lions.

See also Category:Llanelli RFC players

- (Wales) Owen Badger – Welsh international
- (Wales) Neil Boobyer – Welsh international
- (Wales) (New Zealand) Matt Cardey – Welsh international
- (Wales) Howard Davies – Welsh international
- (Wales) Jack Evans – Welsh international
- (Wales) Ike Fowler – Welsh international
- (Wales) Rhys Gabe – Welsh international, British Lion
- (Wales) Andrew Gibbs – Welsh international
- (Wales) Clive Griffiths – Welsh international
- (Wales) Chico Hopkins – Welsh international, British Lion
- (Wales) Bryn Howells – Welsh rugby union and league international
- (Wales) Carwyn James – Welsh international, British Lions coach, broadcaster
- (Wales) Barry John – Welsh international, British Lion
- (Wales) Ken Jones – Welsh international, British Lion
- (Wales) Frederick Margrave – Welsh international
- (Wales) Phil May – Welsh international
- (Wales) Rupert Moon – Welsh international
- (Wales) Mark Perego – Welsh international
- (Wales) Wayne Proctor – Welsh international
- (Wales) Paul Ringer – Welsh international
- (Wales) Mark Taylor – Welsh international
- (Wales) Watcyn Thomas – Welsh international
- (Wales) James Watts – Welsh international

== Games played against international opposition ==
Year	Date	Opponent	Result	Score	Tour
1888	19 December	Māori	Win	3–0	1888 New Zealand Native tour
1903	15 January	Canada	Won	11–9	1903 Canada rugby tour of the British Isles
1906	29 December	South Africa	Loss	3–16	1906 South Africa rugby union tour
1908	17 October	Australia	Won	8–3	1908 Australia tour of British Isles and France
1912	19 October	South Africa	Loss	7–8	1912–13 South Africa rugby union tour
1924	2 December	New Zealand	Lost	3–8	1924–25 New Zealand tour
1926	13 November	Māori	Win	3–0	1926–27 New Zealand Māori rugby union tour
1931	24 November	South Africa	Loss	0–9	1931–32 South Africa rugby union tour
1935	22 October	New Zealand	Loss	8–16	1935–36 New Zealand rugby union tour
1947	17 January	Australia	Lost	4-6	1947–48 Australia rugby union tour of Britain, Ireland, France and North America
1951	23 October	South Africa	Loss	11–20	1951–52 South Africa rugby union tour
1953	17 November	New Zealand	Loss	3–17	1953/54 All Blacks tour of the British Isles, France and North America
1957	August	Czechoslovakia	Win	35–9	Llanelli tour of Russia
1957	August	Czechoslovakia	Win	35–9	Llanelli tour of Russia
1957	10 December	Australia	Loss	5-9	1957–58 Australia rugby union tour
1963	31 December	New Zealand	Loss	8–22	1963/64 All Blacks tour of the British Isles, France and Canada
1967	17 January	Australia	Won	11–0	1966–67 Australia rugby union tour
1970	20 January	South Africa	Loss	9–10	1969–70 South Africa rugby union tour
1972	31 October	New Zealand	Win	9–3	1972–73 New Zealand rugby union tour of the British Isles, France and North America
1974	17 September	Tonga	Win	24–15	1974 Tonga Tour to the British Isles
1975	4 November	Australia	Draw	28–28	1975–76 Australia rugby union tour of Britain and Ireland
1980	21 October	New Zealand	Loss	10–16	1980 All Blacks tour
1982	6 November	New Zealand Māori	Win	16–9	1982 New Zealand Māori rugby union tour of Wales
1984	20 November	Australia	Win	19–16	1984 Australia tour of Britain and Ireland
1985	5 November	Fiji	Win	31–28	1985 Fiji rugby union tour of British Isles
1986	16 August	Fiji	Loss	12–16	Llanelli at the National Stadium, Suva, Fiji
1989	28 October	New Zealand	Loss	0–11	1989 New Zealand rugby union tour
1992	14 November	Australia	Win	13–9	1992 Australia rugby union tour of Europe
1995	7 November	Fiji	Loss	12–38	1995 Fiji rugby union tour of Wales and Ireland
1997	8 November	New Zealand	Loss	3–81	1997 New Zealand rugby union tour of Britain and Ireland

== Bibliography ==
- Bevan, Alun Wyn (2005). Stradey Stories. Llandysul: Gomer Press. ISBN 978-1-84323-570-5.
- Hughes, Gareth (1983). One hundred years of Scarlet. Llanelli Rugby Football Club. ISBN 0-9509159-0-4.
- Hughes, Gareth (1986). The Scarlets: A History of Llanelli Rugby Club. Llanelli: Llanelli Borough Council. ISBN 0-906821-05-3.
- Smith, David; Williams, Gareth (1980). Fields of Praise: The Official History of The Welsh Rugby Union. Cardiff: University of Wales Press. ISBN 0-7083-0766-3.
