= Ranfurly Shield 1920–1929 =

New Zealand rugby union trophy

The Ranfurly Shield, colloquially known as the Log o' Wood, is perhaps the most prestigious trophy in New Zealand's domestic rugby union competition. First played for in 1904, the Ranfurly Shield is based on a challenge system, rather than a league or knockout competition as with most football trophies. The holding union must defend the Shield in challenge matches, and if a challenger defeats them, they become the new holder of the Shield. Hawke's Bay were the most successful team during this period with 24 successful defences which was, at that stage, a record.

== Holders ==
Union	Won	Successful defences
Wellington	Held at beginning of decade	10
Southland	15 September 1920	1
Wellington	10 September 1921	2
Hawke's Bay	9 August 1922	24
Wairarapa	3 June 1927	2
Manawhenua	6 August 1927	2
Canterbury	7 September 1927	1
Wairarapa	18 July 1928	8
Southland	31 August 1929	0

== Fixtures ==
=== 1920 ===
2 June 1920
Match 43

Wellington	15–3	Canterbury
Try: Jack Shearer, Beethoven Algar, A. Gilchrist; Con: Edward Roberts (3)		Pen: Edward Hasell

Athletic Park, Wellington
Attendance: 10,000
Referee: Henry Paton (Wellington)

30 June 1920
Match 44

Wellington	22–3	Bay of Plenty
Try: George Aitken (2), N.A.J. Barker, A.D. Jackson, E.E. Hughes, S.J. Standen; Con: E.E. Hughes, Ranji Wilson		Try: Duncan Heather

Athletic Park, Wellington
Attendance: 3,000
Referee: A.W. Thompson (Manawatu)

7 July 1920
Match 45

Wellington	20–9	Taranaki
Try: George Aitken, Mark Nicholls, Harry Nicholls, Jack Shearer; Con: Mark Nicholls; Pen: Mark Nicholls; Drop: Mark Nicholls		Try: F.S. McKenna; Con: S.D. George; Drop: D. Sykes

Showgrounds Oval, Hawera
Attendance: 5,000
Referee: F.C. Atkinson (Wanganui)

28 July 1920
Match 46

Wellington	20–5	Hawke's Bay
Try: James Ryan (2), R.J. Harkness, Umberto Calcinai, Fred Tilyard, N.A.J. Barker; Con: Mark Nicholls		Try: James Mapu; Con: E. Kuru

Athletic Park, Wellington
Attendance: 3,000
Referee: John L. Simpson (Wellington)

7 August 1920
Match 47

Wellington	23–20	Auckland
Try: Umberto Calcinai (2), Ranji Wilson, N.A.J. Barker, E.E. Hughes; Con: Mark Nicholls (4)		Try: A.P. Singe, E. Earlly, R. Taylor; Con: G.W. Murray, W.A. Laxon; Pen: W.A. Laxon; Drop: Charles Kingstone

Auckland Domain, Auckland
Attendance: 15,000
Referee: F.C. Atkinson (Wanganui)

21 August 1920
Match 48

Wellington	16–5	Taranaki
Try: George Aitken (2), James Tilyard, Edmond Ryan; Con: Edward Roberts (2)		Try: H.T. Wilkinson; Con: R.W. Roberts

Athletic Park, Wellington
Attendance: 4,000
Referee: Charles Kitto (Wellington)

28 August 1920
Match 49

Wellington	20–14	Wanganui
Try: N.A.J. Barker, James Tilyard, George Aitken, Mark Nicholls; Con: Mark Nicholls (2); Drop: Edmond Ryan		Try: T. Sullivan, R. Scott, Kenneth Svenson; Con: R. Cowie; Pen: R. Cowie

Athletic Park, Wellington
Attendance: 5,000
Referee: John L. Simpson (Wellington)

4 September 1920
Match 50

Wellington	20–3	Auckland
Try: Edmond Ryan, Umberto Calcinai, E.E. Hughes, James Tilyard; Con: Mark Nicholls (2); Drop: Edward Roberts		Try: T. Campbell

Athletic Park, Wellington
Attendance: 16,000
Referee: Edward McKenzie (Wairarapa)

9 September 1920
Match 51

Wellington	32–16	South Canterbury
Try: W. O'Sullivan (2), T. Price (2), Umberto Calcinai, Sydney Shearer, Ranji Wilson; Con: Mark Nicholls (4); Pen: Mark Nicholls		Try: Phillippe Cabot, J.E. Cooke; Con: A. Scott (2); Drop: A. Scott

Caledonian Ground, Timaru
Attendance: 4,000
Referee: R. McKenzie (Otago)

11 September 1920
Match 52

Wellington	16–5	Otago
Try: W. O'Sullivan (2); Con: Mark Nicholls; Drop: Edward Roberts (2)		Try: William Fea; Con: J. Turnbull

Carisbrook, Dunedin
Attendance: 12,000
Referee: R. McKenzie (Otago)

15 September 1920
Match 53

Southland	17–6	Wellington
Try: N.F. Stead (2), G.A. Fortune, J.W. Holmes; Con: I.H. Brown; Pen: Andrew White		Try: J.W. McCabe; Con: Mark Nicholls

Rugby Park Stadium, Invercargill
Attendance: (Note: Described as "the largest crowd ever seen at the park")
Referee: John Stalker (Southland)

=== 1921 ===
20 August 1921
Match 53

Southland	10–8	Otago
Try: E.H. Diack, E.M. Gilmour; Con: H. Agnew (2)		Try: E.B. Stewart; Con: R.C. Bell; Pen: R.C. Bell

Rugby Park Stadium, Invercargill
Attendance: 7,000
Referee: J.F. Peake (Canterbury)

10 September 1921
Match 54

Wellington	28–13	Southland
Try: E.W. King, C.J.M. Gair, F.C. Hutchinson, Sydney Shearer, Paul Markham; Con: Mark Nicholls (2); Pen: Mark Nicholls (2); Drop: F.C. Hutchinson		Try: E.H. Diack, H.J. Brown, L.R. Lopdell; Con: H. Agnew (2)

Athletic Park, Wellington
Attendance: 10,000
Referee: R. McKenzie (Otago)

21 September 1921
Match 55

Wellington	27–19	Auckland
Try: A.D. Jackson (2), Doug Algar, Jack Shearer, Sydney Shearer, Mark Nicholls; Con: Mark Nicholls; Pen: Mark Nicholls; Drop: Mark Nicholls		Try: Laurie Knight, L.C. Williams, Ces Badeley, Karl Ifwersen; Con: Ces Badeley (2); Pen: Victor Badeley

Athletic Park, Wellington
Attendance: 4,500
Referee: John L. Simpson (Wellington)

24 September 1921
Match 56

Wellington	13–8	Otago
Try: E.W. King, James Duncan, Mark Nicholls; Drop: Harry Nicholls		Try: G.L. Owles (2); Con: Johnstone Richardson

Athletic Park, Wellington
Attendance: 9,000
Referee: Herbert McKenzie (Wairarapa)

=== 1922 ===
9 August 1922
Match 57

Hawke's Bay	19–9	Wellington
Try: Jack Kirwan (2), J.H. Scott, Jack NcNab; Con: Gordon Yates (2); Pen: Gordon Yates		Try: Ward Udy, S.J. Standen, W.T. Ryan

Athletic Park, Wellington
Attendance: 4,000
Referee: Alfred Neilson (Wellington)

2 September 1922
Match 58

Hawke's Bay	17–16	Bay of Plenty
Try: Cyril Brownlie, L.H. Hingston, Wattie Barclay, Jackie Blake; Con: Gordon Yates; Pen: Gordon Yates		Try: P. Wihapi, David Borell, Charles Montgomery, C. Alexander; Con: A.L. McLean, Noel Boucher

Nelson Park, Hastings
Attendance: 4,000
Referee: Herbert McKenzie (Wairarapa)

16 September 1922
Match 59

Hawke's Bay	42–8	King Country
Try: Bert Grenside (3), U. Batchelor (2), R.F. O'Donoghue (2), Jack Kirwan, T. Daly; Con: Gordon Yates (5), R.F. O'Donoghue; Pen: Gordon Yates		Try: R.L. Harty; Con: J.B. Macken; Pen: J.B. Macken

McLean Park, Napier
Referee: Bill O'Neill (Hawke's Bay)

=== 1923 ===
4 June 1923
Match 60

Hawke's Bay	6–0	Wairarapa
Try: Percy Martin-Smith; Pen: George Nēpia

McLean Park, Napier
Attendance: 5,000
Referee: John L. Simpson (Wellington)

28 July 1923
Match 61

Hawke's Bay	10–6	Wellington
Pen: George Nēpia; Drop: Gordon Yates, Alexander Kirkpatrick		Try: W.F.F. Faber, John Duncan

McLean Park, Napier
Attendance: 6,000
Referee: Herbert McKenzie (Wairarapa)

11 August 1923
Match 62

Hawke's Bay	15–0	Poverty Bay
Try: N.L. Kivell, Cyril Brownlie, James Mapu, George Nēpia, Jimmy Mill

Nelson Park, Hastings
Referee: A.E. Freeman (Wairarapa)

15 August 1923
Match 63

Hawke's Bay	9–8	Canterbury
Try: George Nēpia, Lui Paewai, Bert Grenside		Try: J.H. Parker; Con: I.H. Brown; Drop: I.H. Brown

Nelson Park, Hastings
Attendance: 5,000
Referee: F.C. Atkinson (Wanganui)

8 September 1923
Match 64

Hawke's Bay	38–11	Horowhenua
Try: Bert Grenside (3), Alby Falwasser, T. Daly, Sam Gemmell, Maurice Brownlie, J. Walker, William Irvine, George Nēpia; Con: George Nēpia (3), Maurice Brownlie		Try: K. Kelly, Rewi Moynihan; Con: Hohepa Jacob; Pen: Hohepa Jacob

McLean Park, Napier
Attendance: 5,000
Referee: George Maddison (Hawke's Bay)

22 September 1923
Match 65

Hawke's Bay	20–5	Auckland
Try: Jimmy Mill (2), Lui Paewai, Jack McNab, J. Walker; Con: George Nēpia; Drop: George Nēpia		Try: Bert Cooke; Con: Karl Ifwersen

McLean Park, Napier
Attendance: 8,500
Referee: Alfred Eckhold (Otago)

=== 1924 ===
3 June 1924
Match 66

Hawke's Bay	30–14	Wairarapa
Try: Bert Grenside (2), Jimmy Mill, Jackie Blake, J.W.D. Mardon, Alexander Kirkpatrick, Sam Gemmell, Alby Falwasser; Con: N. McCarthy (3)		Try: Albert Desmond (2), H. Parker; Con: J. Hiroti; Pen: J. Hiroti

McLean Park, Napier
Attendance: 4,800
Referee: Charles Kitto (Wellington)

21 June 1924
Match 67

Hawke's Bay	46–10	Poverty Bay
Try: Bert Grenside (4), Jack McNab (2), Cyril Brownlie (2), Alby Falwasser, Tiaki Omana, N.L. Kivell; Con: George Nēpia (2), Jimmy Mill (2), William Irvine; Pen: George Nēpia		Try: Robert Whaitiri, J.H. Scott; Con: P. Tureia (2)

McLean Park, Napier
Attendance: 5,000
Referee: George Madison (Hawke's Bay)

16 August 1924
Match 68

Hawke's Bay	35–3	Nelson
Try: Alby Falwasser (4), Jackie Blake (2), C.C. Hingston, J. Hebberley; Con: J.W.D. Mardon; Pen: Gordon Yates (2), L.A. Miller		Try: C.H.A. Kinzett

Nelson Park, Hastings
Referee: E.D. Berry (Hawke's Bay)

23 August 1924
Match 69

Hawke's Bay	23–6	Auckland
Try: Bert Grenside (2), Tiaki Omana, Alby Falwasser, Jackie Blake; Con: Gordon Yates; Pen: Gordon Yates; Drop: Tommy Corkill		Try: Neil Ifwersen; Drop: J. Kirwan

McLean Park, Napier
Referee: Bill O'Neill (Hawke's Bay)

30 August 1924
Match 70

Hawke's Bay	31–5	Manawatu
Try: Tommy Corkill (3), Alby Falwasser (3), J.W.D. Mardon (2), C.C. Hingston; Con: Gordon Yates, L.A. Miller		Try: J. McDonald; Con: L.J. Mullins

Nelson Park, Hastings
Attendance: 4,000
Referee: George Madison (Hawke's Bay)

=== 1925 ===
3 June 1925
Match 71

Hawke's Bay	22–3	Wairarapa
Try: Bert Grenside (2), Jimmy Mill, Cyril Brownlie, M. Mahoney; Con: George Nēpia, L.A. Miller; Drop: H.H. Wylie		Pen: Frank Booth

McLean Park, Napier
Attendance: 10,000
Referee: F.C. Atkinson (Wanganui)

5 August 1925
Match 72

Hawke's Bay	24–18	Canterbury
Try: Maurice Brownlie, Bert Grenside, Jackie Blake, Jimmy Mill, Alby Falwasser; Con: William Irvine (3); Pen: William Irvine		Try: S. Baird, Alan Robilliard, W.A. Ford, C.J. Oliver; Con: D.C. Nixon (3)

McLean Park, Napier
Attendance: 10,000
Referee: Herbert McKenzie (Wairarapa)

8 August 1925
Match 73

Hawke's Bay	31–12	Southland
Try: Sam Gemmell (2), Tommy Corkill, Maurice Brownlie, Alexander Kirkpatrick, Jackie Blake, Alby Falwasser, Bert Grenside, J. Walker; Con: William Irvine (2)		Try: Bill Hazlett, E.I. Ottrey; Con: Frank Kilby; Drop: Frank Kilby

McLean Park, Napier
Attendance: 6,000
Referee: W.J. Meredith (Auckland)

22 August 1925
Match 74

Hawke's Bay	28–3	Taranaki
Try: Wattie Barclay (2), Jackie Blake (2), H.H. Wylie, Maurice Brownlie, Bert Grenside; Con: William Irvine, H.H. Wylie; Pen: Jimmy Mill		Try: Wallace R. Robinson

Nelson Park, Hastings
Attendance: 5,000
Referee: Wm. O'Neill (Hawke's Bay)

5 September 1925
Match 75

Hawke's Bay	20–11	Wellington
Try: John Swain (2), Alby Falwasser, Tommy Corkill, Jackie Blake, Maurice Brownlie; Con: William Irvine		Try: Kenneth Svenson; Con: Mark Nicholls; Pen: Mark Nicholls; Drop: Kenneth Svenson

Athletic Park, Wellington
Attendance: 23,000
Referee: F.C. Atkinson (Wanganui)

9 September 1925
Match 76

Hawke's Bay	34–14	Otago
Try: Jackie Blake (3), Tiaki Omana, Alby Falwasser, J. Walker, Jimmy Mill, Cyril Brownlie; Con: Bert Grenside (3), Gordon Yates (2)		Try: R.G. Webb (2); Con: F. Donnelly; Pen: F. Donnelly; Drop: L.G.T. Townsend

Nelson Park, Hastings
Attendance: 4,000
Referee: Herbert McKenzie (Wairarapa)

=== 1926 ===
3 June 1926
Match 77

Hawke's Bay	77–14	Wairarapa
Try: Jackie Blake (5), Maurice Brownlie (3), Bert Cooke (3), Tommy Corkill (2), E.S. Craven, G. Tait, Bert Grenside, Cyril Brownlie; Con: Bert Grenside (8), Maurice Brownlie (5)		Try: Randall Booth, K.G. Fairbrother; Con: Frederick Fuller; Pen: Frederick Fuller (2)

McLean Park, Napier
Attendance: 8,000
Referee: George Madison (Hawke's Bay)

5 June 1926
Match 78

Hawke's Bay	36–3	Wanganui
Try: Bert Cooke (3), Bert Grenside (2), John Swain (2), G. Tait, William Irvine, Alexander Kirkpatrick; Con: Bert Grenside (2), Jimmy Mill		Pen: Dudley Cameron

Nelson Park, Hastings
Attendance: 5,000
Referee: E.D. Berry (Hawke's Bay)

14 August 1926
Match 79

Hawke's Bay	58–8	Wellington
Try: Bert Grenside (5), Alexander Kirkpatrick (2), Jackie Blake, Cyril Brownlie, Bert Cooke, L.M. Johnson, Edward Single, John Swain; Con: George Nēpia (7), Bert Grenside; Pen: George Nēpia		Try: E.F. Barry; Con: Mark Nicholls; Pen: Mark Nicholls

McLean Park, Napier
Attendance: 14,000
Referee: Alfred Eckhold (Otago)

21 August 1926
Match 80

Hawke's Bay	41–11	Auckland
Try: Jackie Blake (3), Bert Cooke (2), Maurice Brownlie, Cyril Brownlie, John Swain, M. Mahoney; Con: George Nēpia (2), Bert Grenside (2); Pen: George Nēpia (2)		Try: Neil Ifwersen, F.W. Lucas; Con: Rube McWilliams; Drop: L. Freeman

McLean Park, Napier
Attendance: 8,000
Referee: R.J. Paton (Wellington)

18 September 1926
Match 81

Hawke's Bay	17–15	Canterbury
Try: Bert Grenside (2), William Irvine, Bert Cooke, Maurice Brownlie; Con: Bert Grenside		Try: Alan Robilliard, N. Dorreen; Con: Herb Lilburne; Pen: S.R. Carleton; Drop: Herb Lilburne

Lancaster Park Oval, Christchurch
Attendance: 20,000
Referee: Alfred Eckhold (Otago)

=== 1927 ===
3 June 1927
Match 82

Hawke's Bay	11–15	Wairarapa
Try: John Swain; Con: Bert Grenside; Pen: Bert Grenside (2)		Try: W. Yates; Pen: Rawi Cundy (4)

McLean Park, Napier
Referee: Herbert McKenzie (Wairarapa)

2 July 1927
Match 83

Wairarapa	53–3	Bush
Try: Bert Cooke (3), Clinton Stringfellow (2), W. Yates (2), Randall Booth (2), Rawi Cundy, Walter Reside, I.H. Harvey, Quentin Donald; Con: Bert Cooke (5), Rawi Cundy (3)		Pen: C.B. Udy

Cameron and Soldiers Memorial Park, Masterton
Attendance: 2,000
Referee: Herbert McKenzie (Wairarapa)

9 July 1927
Match 84

Wairarapa	10–21 (Note: Match awarded to Wairarapa following an appeal to the NZRFU. Hawke's Bay had fielded a player who had not fulfilled the necessary residential qualifications and therefore the shield was awarded to Wairarapa.)	Hawke's Bay
Try: L. Roach, Bert Cooke; Con: Rawi Cundy (2)		Try: W.J. Huxtable (2), Wattie Barclay, John Swain; Con: Bert Grenside (3); Pen: Bert Grenside

Solway Showgrounds Oval, Masterton
Attendance: 12,000
Referee: Herbert McKenzie (Wairarapa)

6 August 1927
Match 85

Wairarapa	16–18	Manawhenua
Try: I.H. Harvey, Bert Cooke, Keith Reid; Con: Rawi Cundy (2); Pen: Rawi Cundy		Try: T. Parsons, G. Persson, C. Hunt, Hone McDonald; Con: K.D. Brophy (2), Hohepa Jacob

Showgrounds Oval, Carterton
Attendance: 2,345
Referee: Charles Kitto (Wellington)

31 August 1927
Match 86

Manawhenua	9–3	Taranaki
Try: M. Tremewan, E. Anderson; Pen: Hohepa Jacob		Try: R. O'Keeffe

Showgrounds Oval, Palmerston North
Attendance: 10,000
Referee: F.E. Sutherland (Auckland)

3 September 1927
Match 87

Manawhenua	25–6	Wanganui
Try: Hone McDonald (3), T. Parsons, M. Tremewan, Hohepa Jacob; Con: Hohepa Jacob (2); Pen: Hohepa Jacob		Try: J. Johnston; Pen: F. Leahy

Showgrounds Oval, Palmerston North
Attendance: 5,000
Referee: D.A. Clark (Canterbury)

7 September 1927
Match 88

Manawhenua	6–17	Canterbury
Try: W. Parata; Pen: Hohepa Jacob		Try: Alan Robilliard (2), W.C. Dalley; Con: Herb Lilburne; Pen: S.R. Carleton; Drop: W.C. Dalley

Showgrounds Oval, Palmerston North
Attendance: 8,000
Referee: F.C. Atkinson (Wanganui)

=== 1928 ===
14 July 1928

Canterbury	29–9	South Canterbury
Try: C.D. Chesley (2), George Hart (2), C.J. Oliver, S.F. Fookes, D.G. Grant; Con: C.D. Chesley (4)		Try: T. Manning; Pen: D.G. Fairbrother, E.M. Halsteed

Lancaster Park Oval, Christchurch
Attendance: 15,000
Referee: Alfred Eckhold (Otago)

18 July 1928

Canterbury	7–8	Wairarapa
Try: A.E. Cooke, R. Jury; Con: A.E. Cooke		Pen: C.D. Chesley; Drop: C.J. Oliver

Lancaster Park Oval, Christchurch
Attendance: 20,000
Referee: R. Herd (Otago)

11 August 1928

Wairarapa	57–11	Bush
Try: W. Yates (2), M.J. Parker (2), Bert Cooke (2), Clinton Stringfellow, Stanley Willoughby, I.A. Hart, N. McGregor, K.G. Fairbrother; Con: Rawi Cundy (9); Pen: Rawi Cundy (2)		Try: G. Harris (2), L. Bartosh; Con: C.B. Udy

Cameron and Soldiers Memorial Park, Masterton
Referee: Herbert McKenzie (Wairarapa)

18 August 1928

Wairarapa	26–8	Marlborough
Try: W. Yates (2), Clinton Stringfellow, R. Jury, K.G. Fairbrother, J.T. Walker; Con: Rawi Cundy (3), W. Yates		Try: F. Barclay, L. Hounsell; Con: G. Isherwood

Showgrounds Oval, Carterton
Referee: Herbert McKenzie (Wairarapa)

22 August 1928

Wairarapa	9–3	Wellington
Try: Quentin Donald, G.R. Sharp; Pen: W. Pates		Pen: F.S. Ramson

Showgrounds Oval, Carterton
Attendance: 4,500
Referee: Herbert McKenzie (Wairarapa)

15 September 1928

Wairarapa	31–10	Manawhenua
Try: J.G. Donald (2), M.J. Parker (2), R. Jury, Clinton Stringfellow, Rawi Cundy; Con: Rawi Cundy (3); Drop: L. Roach		Try: D.Tatana, T. Parsons; Drop: W. Gleeson

Showgrounds Oval, Carterton
Referee: Joseph King (Wanganui)

=== 1929 ===
20 July 1929

Wairarapa	10–6	Hawke's Bay
Try: Randall Booth, A.V. Jury; Con: Frederick Fuller (2)		Try: L.F. South; Pen: Jack Ruru

Cameron and Soldiers Memorial Park, Masterton
Attendance: 10,000
Referee: Joseph Moffitt (Wellington)

10 August 1929

Wairarapa	17–14	Auckland
Try: W.R. Irvine; Con: Frederick Fuller; Pen: Frederick Fuller (4)		Try: K.D. Anderson, L.S. Hook, F.S. Lucas, P.C. Minns; Con: Ronald Bush

Showgrounds Oval, Carterton
Attendance: 8,000
Referee: Hugh Whittington (Taranaki)

17 August 1929

Wairarapa	37–16	Manawhenua
Try: Bert Cooke (2), Jimmy Mill, Rawi Cundy, Frederick Fuller, Clinton Stringfellow, Tommy Corkill, J.G. Donald; Con: Rawi Cundy (3), Frederick Fuller (2); Pen: Rawi Cundy		Try: W. Parata, T. Parata, T.J. Miles; Con: Eric Fletcher (2); Pen: Eric Fletcher

Cameron and Soldiers Memorial Park, Masterton
Attendance: 2,000
Referee: T.A. Fletcher (Wellington)

28 August 1929

Wairarapa	17–12	Canterbury
Try: Stanley Willougby, W.R. Irvine, Rawi Cundy; Con: Rawi Cundy, Frederick Fuller; Drop: Bert Cooke		Try: J.T. Robinson, George Hart; Con: Herb Lilburne; Drop: D.M. Hay

Cameron and Soldiers Memorial Park, Masterton
Attendance: 8,000
Referee: Joseph Moffitt (Wellington)

31 August 1929

Wairarapa	16–19	Southland
Try: Clinton Stringfellow (2); Pen: Rawi Cundy, Frederick Fuller; Drop: Frederick Fuller		Try: B.A. Mahoney, R.M. Bird; Pen: G. Porter (2); Drop: G. Porter (2)

Showgrounds Oval, Carterton
Referee: T.A. Fletcher (Wellington)
