= Clinton Stringfellow =

- Born: John Clinton Stringfellow; 26 February 1905 Chertsey, New Zealand
- Died: 4 January 1959 (aged 53) Mauriceville, New Zealand
- Height: 1.78 m (5 ft 10 in)
- Weight: 79 kg (174 lb)
- School: Timaru Boys' High School

Rugby union career
- Position(s): Centre; Fullback
Provincial / State sides
Years	Team	Apps	(Points)
1925–35	Wairarapa	107	
1937	Bush		
International career
Years	Team	Apps	(Points)
1929	New Zealand	2	(3)

John Clinton Stringfellow (26 February 1905 – 4 January 1959) was a New Zealand rugby union player. A fullback and centre, Stringfellow represented Wairarapa and, briefly, Bush at a provincial level, and was a member of the New Zealand national side, the All Blacks, on their 1929 tour of Australia. On that tour, he played seven matches, including two internationals, scoring 16 points in all.

During World War II, Stringfellow served as a private in the 2nd New Zealand Divisional Postal Unit, New Zealand Engineers. He died on 4 January 1959 at Mauriceville, and was buried in the Archer Street Cemetery, Masterton.
