= Tommy Corkill =

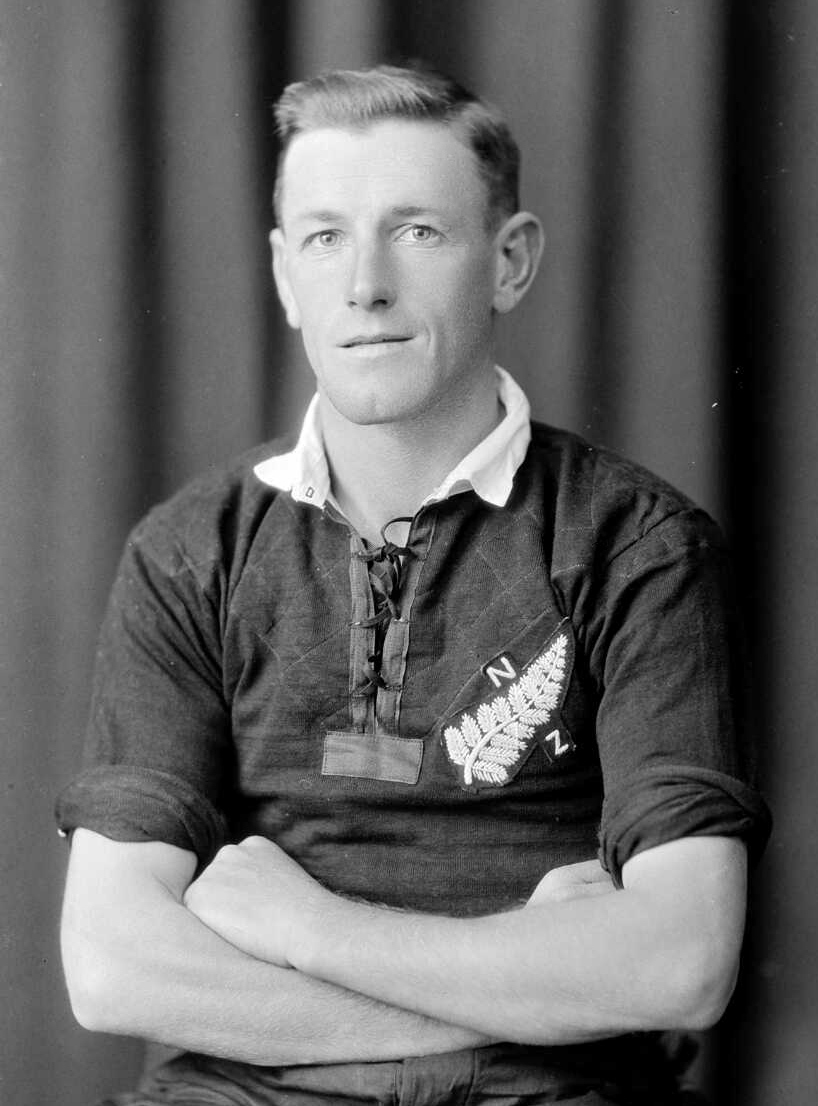
- Corkill in 1925
- Born: Thomas George Corkill; 9 July 1901 Wairoa, New Zealand
- Died: 9 May 1966 (aged 64) Wellington, New Zealand
- Height: 1.78 m (5 ft 10 in)
- Weight: 70 kg (11 st 0 lb)
- School: St. Patrick's College
- Occupation: Clerk

Rugby union career
- Position: Utility back
Amateur team(s)
Years	Team	Apps	(Points)
1923	Wairoa City		
1924–27	Wairoa Pirates		
1929–30	Red Star		
Provincial / State sides
Years	Team	Apps	(Points)
1923–27	Hawke's Bay	31	
1929–30	Wairarapa	15	
1930	Wairarapa-Bush	1	
International career
Years	Team	Apps	(Points)
1925	New Zealand		

Thomas George Corkill (9 July 1901 – 9 May 1966) was a New Zealand rugby union player who represented the New Zealand national team, the All Blacks in 1925. His position of choice was preferably a halfback however he was used throughout the backline both provincially and internationally.

Although born in Wairoa, in the Hawke's Bay, Corkill was educated at St. Patrick's College in Wellington. He was a member of the 1st XV in 1918.

== Career ==
Corkill played one season for the Wairoa City club in 1923. The next season he transferred to the Wairoa Pirates club where he played until 1927. During this period Corkill represented Hawke's Bay on 31 occasions, with 10 of these being Ranfurly Shield matches.

It was in 1925 where he would achieve his All Black status, after being selected to tour Australia, playing against teams from New South Wales. As Don Wright was the preferred halfback in the touring party Corkill was forced to play in other positions. In his four games on tour Corkill played two as a fly-half and the other two at halfback. One of his tour games was the final fixture, against a combined Wellington-Manawatu-Horowhenua side once they had returned to New Zealand.

After two more seasons in the Hawke's Bay Corkill moved to Masterton where he joined the Red Star club (now known as Masterton Red Star due to a merge) in 1929. In his two seasons in the Wairarapa he was once again made to play in other backline positions due to fellow Hawke's Bay player Jimmy Mill, also a halfback, making the move at the same time. He totaled 15 matches for the Wairarapa union and one more, in 1930 against the touring British Lions, when the union combined with Bush.

== Personal life and death ==
On 24 November 1930 Corkill married Miss Cook. He later moved back from Masterton to Wellington and worked as a clerk. He died on 9 May 1966 and was buried at Karori Cemetery.
