= Chertsey (disambiguation) =

Chertsey is a town in England.

Chertsey may also refer to:

- Chertsey, Quebec, a municipality in Quebec
- Chertsey, New Zealand, a town in New Zealand
- Chertsey (UK Parliament constituency)
