= Quentin Donald =

New Zealand rugby union player and local politician

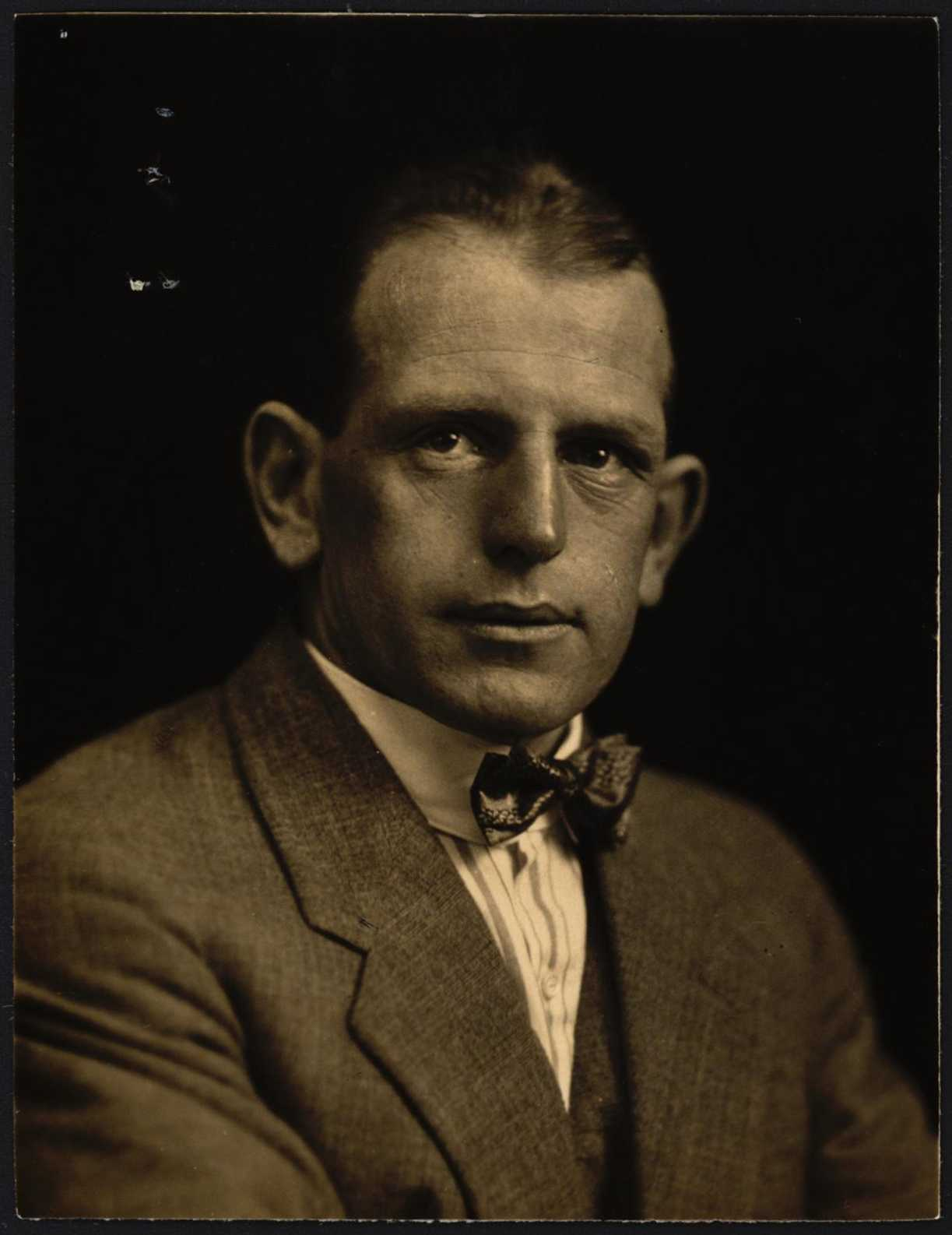
- Born: 13 March 1900 Featherston, New Zealand
- Died: 27 December 1965 (aged 65) Greytown, New Zealand
- Height: 1.78 m (5 ft 10 in)
- Weight: 79 kg (174 lb)
- School: Wellington College)
- Notable relative: Jim Donald (brother)
- Occupation: Farmer

Rugby union career
- Position: Hooker
Provincial / State sides
Years	Team	Apps	(Points)
1918–28	Wairarapa	47	
International career
Years	Team	Apps	(Points)
1923–25	New Zealand	4	(0)

Quentin Donald (13 March 1900 – 27 December 1965) was a New Zealand rugby union player and local politician. He appeared in 23 matches for the New Zealand national side, the All Blacks, and served on the Featherston County Council for 27 years.

== Early life and family ==
Born in Featherston on 13 March 1900, Donald was the son of Alice Donald (née Ford) and her husband, Quentin Donald, a farmer. He was the younger brother of Jim Donald, who also played for the All Blacks. Donald was educated at Wellington College, where he was a member of the 1st XV rugby team in 1917.

Donald became engaged to Hazel Winifred Meikle Davies in July 1924, and the couple married in Wellington on 16 December 1925. Donald's best man was Rawi Cundy.

== Rugby union ==
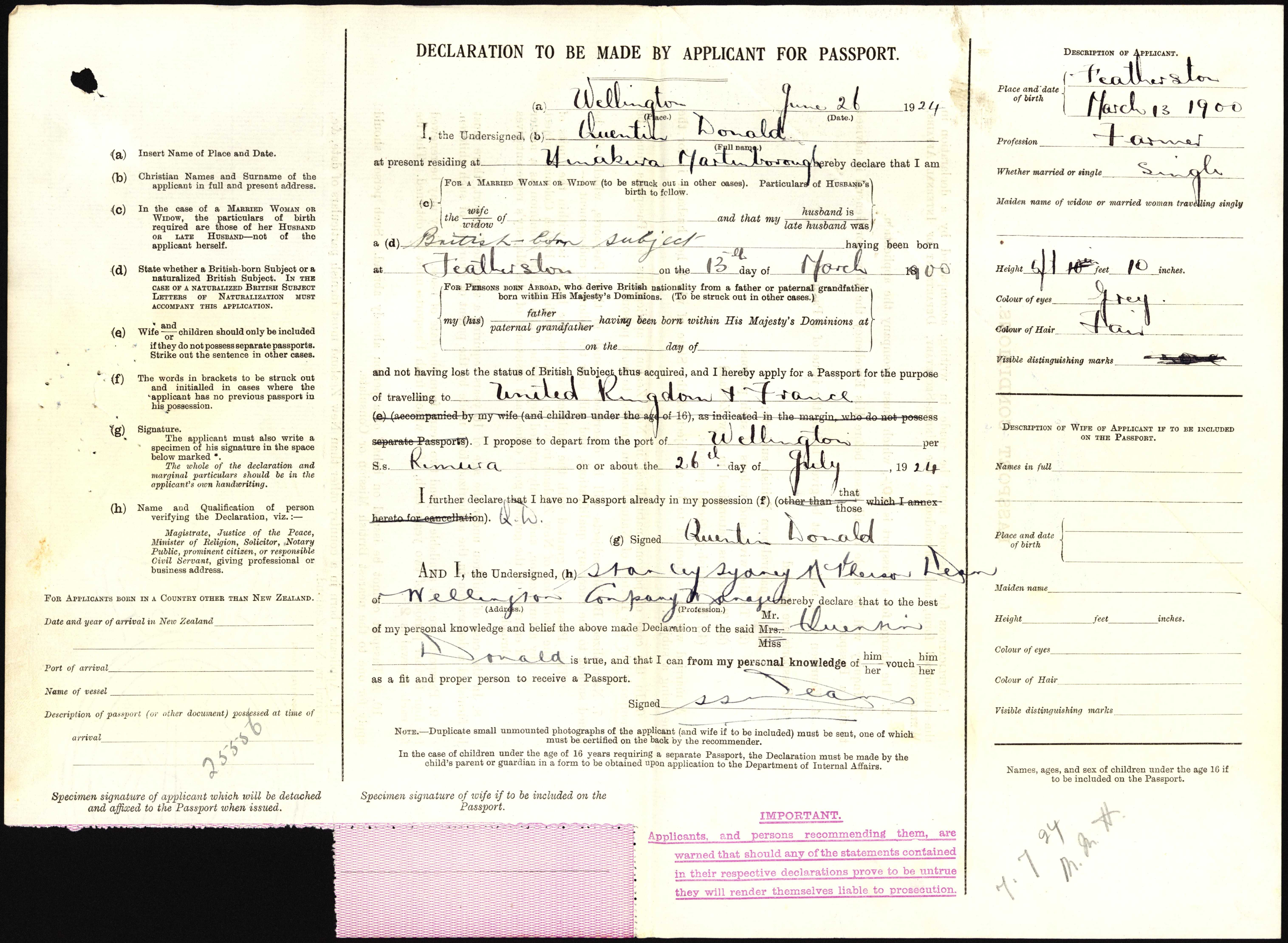
Quentin Donald passport application (1924)

A hooker, Donald made his debut for Wairarapa in 1918, the year after he left school, and in that first season he played five matches for the provincial side. The following year he made the first of his two appearances for the North Island in the inter-island fixture.

Donald first played for the All Blacks in 1923, in a match against the touring New South Wales team at Lancaster Park, Christchurch, and scored a try in New Zealand's 34–6 victory. He was selected for the 1924–25 tour of Britain, Ireland and France after playing in three trial matches and the 1924 inter-island fixture. On that tour, he played in 22 matches, including four internationals, and scored five tries, and was regarded as one of the outstanding forwards in the team. However, he retired from all rugby after the team, dubbed "The Invincibles" as they went undefeated on tour, returned to New Zealand.

In 1927, Donald came out of retirement and once again played for the Wairarapa provincial team, most notably in the Ranfurly Shield defence against Hawke's Bay at Masterton that season, which came to be known as the Battle of Solway. Both Donald and Hawke's Bay player Maurice Brownlie were sent off after an on-field incident.

Donald played his last season for Wairarapa in 1928, having played 47 times for his province, and in 78 first-class games overall. He later served as a Wairarapa selector in 1935.

== Politics and community involvement ==
Donald was first elected to the Featherston County Council in November 1938, filling the vacancy caused by the death of his father who had served on the council for 30 years, including as chairman from 1919 until May 1938. He served as a county councillor until 1965.

A farmer, Donald was an active member of the Wairarapa and East Coast Agricultural and Pastoral Society, serving as vice president between 1946 and 1949, and president from 1949 to 1951.

== Death ==
Donald died at Greytown on 27 December 1965, the year after his wife's death, and was buried at Waihenga Cemetery, Martinborough.
