= Reside (surname) =

Reside is a surname. Notable people with the surname include:

- John Reside (1867–1902), Australian politician and trade unionist
- Stuart Reside (born 1978), Australian rower
- Walter Reside (1905–1985), New Zealand rugby union player
