= Keith Reid (rugby union) =

- Full name: Keith Howard Reid
- Born: 25 May 1904 Clareville, New Zealand
- Died: 24 May 1972 (aged 67) Masterton, New Zealand
- Height: 173 cm (5 ft 8 in)
- Weight: 82 kg (181 lb)

Rugby union career
- Position: Hooker
Provincial / State sides
Years	Team	Apps	(Points)
1920–35	Wairarapa	91	
International career
Years	Team	Apps	(Points)
1929	New Zealand	2	(0)

Keith Howard Reid (25 May 1904 — 24 May 1972) was a New Zealand international rugby union player.

Born in Clareville, Reid was capped twice by the All Blacks as a hooker on their 1929 tour of Australia. He played the 1st Test at the Sydney Sports Ground and the 3rd Test at the Sydney Cricket Ground, partnering Anthony Cottrell up front.

Reid won his All Blacks selection from Carterton and also played club rugby with Petone.

A Wairarapa stalwart, Reid was in the side that claimed the Ranfurly Shield for the first time in 1927, ending the five-year reign of Hawke's Bay, then served as the union's president through the 1950s.

== See also ==
- List of New Zealand national rugby union players
