= Jack Griffiths (rugby union) =

New Zealand rugby union player

Jack Griffiths MC
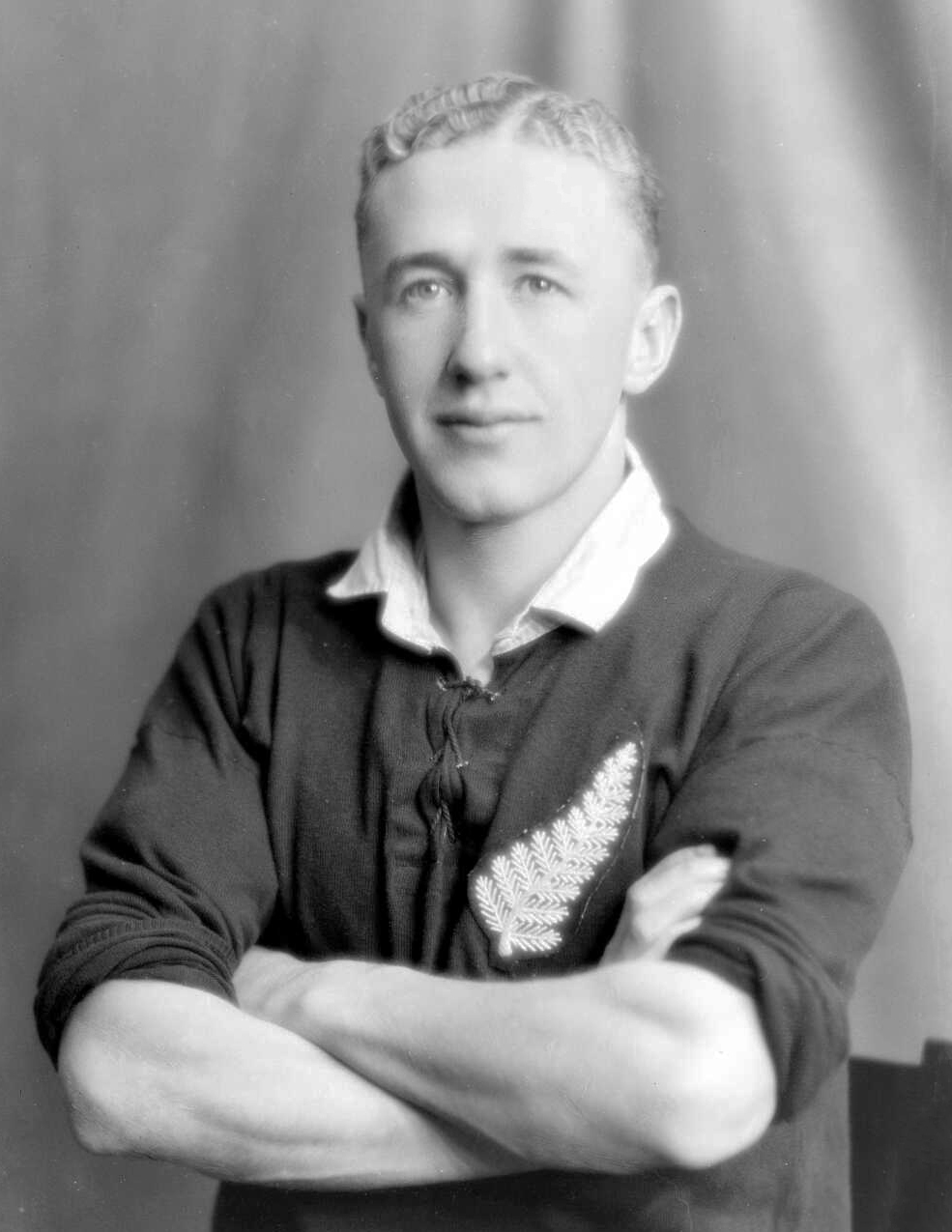
- Griffiths in 1935
- Born: Jack Lester Griffiths; 8 April 1912 Wellington, New Zealand
- Died: 13 November 2001 (aged 89) Wellington, New Zealand
- Height: 1.73 m (5 ft 8 in)
- Weight: 68 kg (150 lb)
- School: Wellington College
- Notable relative(s): Fred Tilyard (uncle); James Tilyard (uncle)

Rugby union career
- Position(s): First five-eighth, second five-eighth, centre
Provincial / State sides
| Years | Team | Apps | (Points) |
| 1931–38 | Wellington | | |
International career
| Years | Team | Apps | (Points) |
| 1934–38 | New Zealand | 7 | (0) |

Jack Lester Griffiths MC (8 April 1912 – 13 November 2001) was a New Zealand rugby union player. A utility back who played in every backline position except on the wing, Griffiths represented Wellington at a provincial level, and was a member of the New Zealand national side, the All Blacks, from 1934 to 1938. He played 30 matches for the All Blacks—three of which were as captain—including seven internationals. In all he scored 50 points for the All Blacks, but none in Test matches.

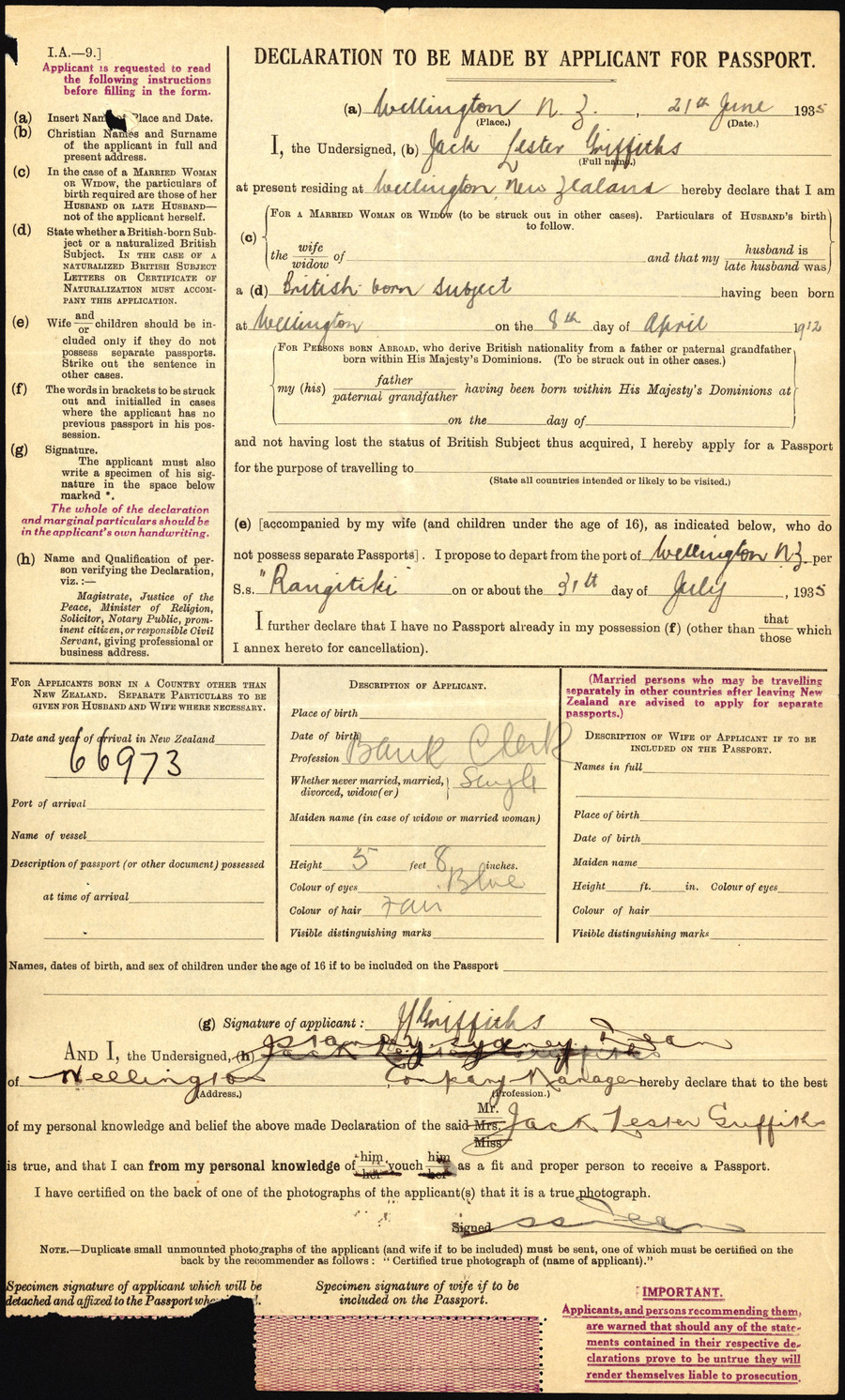
Jack Lester Griffiths passport application (1935)

As a cricketer, Griffiths played for Wanganui in the Hawke Cup in the 1938–39 season. He later was involved in rugby in an administrative capacity, serving as a Poverty Bay selector, a member of both the Wanganui and Manawatu management committees, and as a New Zealand Rugby Football Union council member from 1961 to 1972.

During World War II, Griffiths served with the 2nd New Zealand Expeditionary Force (NZEF), rising to the rank of major and serving as an aide-de-camp to Bernard Freyberg. Griffiths was awarded the Military Cross in 1945 for gallant and distinguished services in Italy, and was mentioned in dispatches. In 1940 he was captain of the 19th Infantry Battalion rugby team that won the Freyberg Cup, as well as the 2nd NZEF team that played against Combined Services.

Griffiths died in Wellington on 13 November 2001.
