= Ginger Nicholls =

- Full name: Harry Edgar Nicholls
- Born: 21 January 1900 Wellington, New Zealand
- Died: 1 April 1978 (aged 78) Lower Hutt, New Zealand
- Height: 165 cm (5 ft 5 in)
- Weight: 58.93 kg (130 lb)
- School: Wellington College
- Notable relative(s): Harold Nicholls (brother); Mark Nicholls (brother)

Rugby union career
- Position: Halfback
Provincial / State sides
Years	Team	Apps	(Points)
1917–26	Wellington		
International career
Years	Team	Apps	(Points)
1921	New Zealand	1	(0)

Harry Edgar "Ginger" Nicholls (21 January 1900 — 1 April 1978) was a New Zealand international rugby union player.

== Biography ==
Nicholls was raised in Petone and attended Wellington College. His elder brother Harold was an All Black five-eighth, as was younger brother Mark, a member of the 1924–25 "Invincibles".

A diminutive halfback, standing at 165 cm, Nicholls debuted for Wellington at the age of 17. He won All Blacks selection over experienced halfback Edward Roberts for the opening Test against the visiting 1921 Springboks, sharing his debut with his younger brother, and in a winning cause performed well enough to receive the outstanding back award from the selection panel. Despite this, Nicholls was replaced by Roberts for the remaining internationals and wasn't capped again, although he did feature on the 1922 tour of New South Wales. He also captained the All Blacks in a home match against the NSW Waratahs in 1923. He went on the Invincibles tour as a press correspondent.

== See also ==
- List of New Zealand national rugby union players
