= William Irvine (rugby union) =

New Zealand rugby union player (1898–1952)

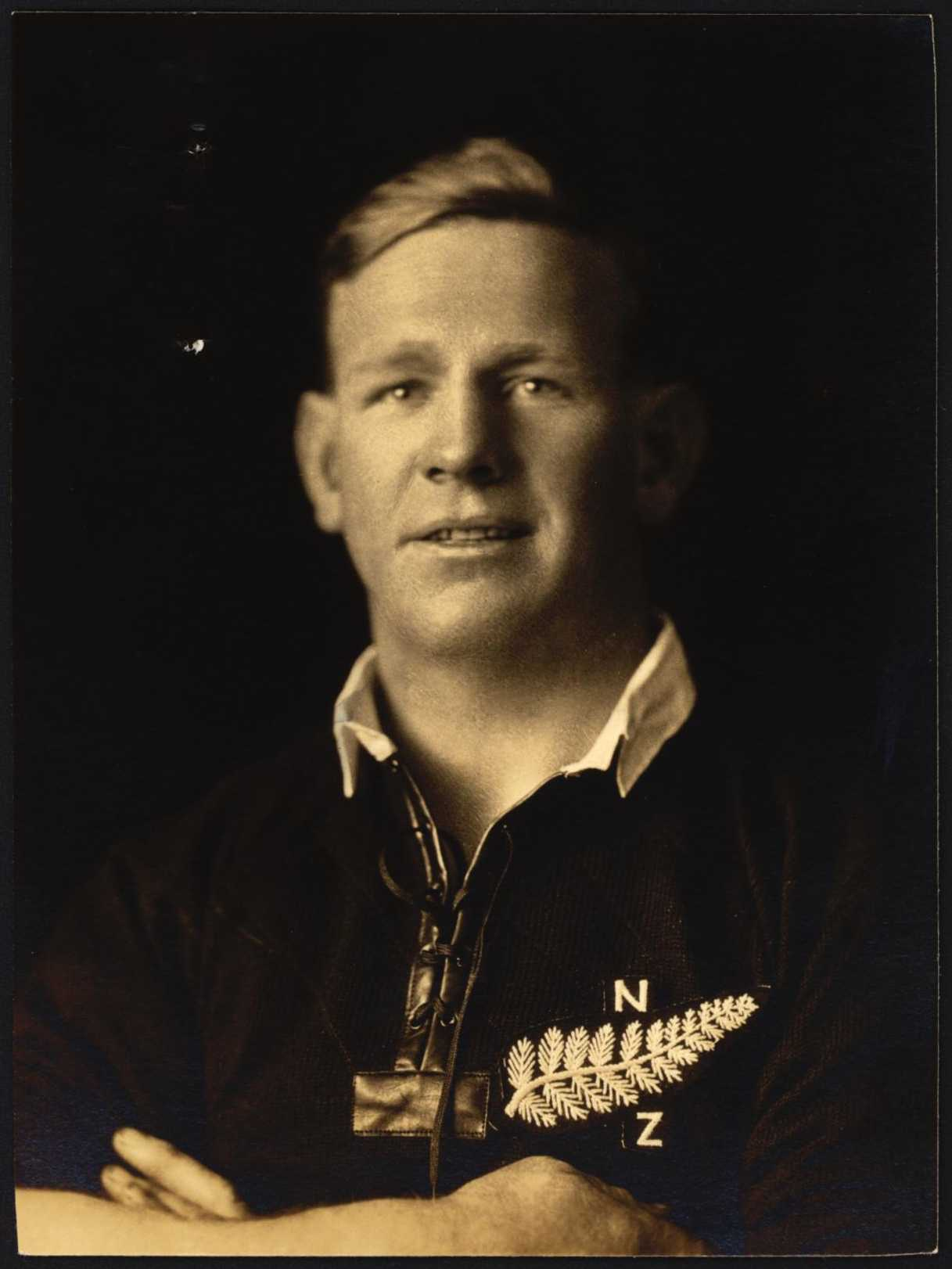
- Born: William Richard Irvine; 2 December 1898 Auckland, New Zealand
- Died: 26 April 1952 (aged 53) Whangārei, New Zealand
- Height: 1.72 m (5 ft 8 in)
- Weight: 83 kg (183 lb)
- Notable relative: Ian Irvine (son)

Rugby union career
- Position: Hooker
Provincial / State sides
Years	Team	Apps	(Points)
1920–21, 1927–30	Wairarapa		
1922–26	Hawke's Bay		
International career
Years	Team	Apps	(Points)
1923–30	New Zealand	5	(9)

William Richard "Bull" Irvine (2 December 1898 – 26 April 1952) was a New Zealand rugby union player. A hooker, Irvine represented Wairarapa and Hawke's Bay at a provincial level, and was a member of the New Zealand national side, the All Blacks, from 1923 to 1930. He played 41 matches for the All Blacks including five internationals, scoring seven tries in all.

Irvine died in Whangārei on 26 April 1952, and he was buried in Kamo Cemetery.

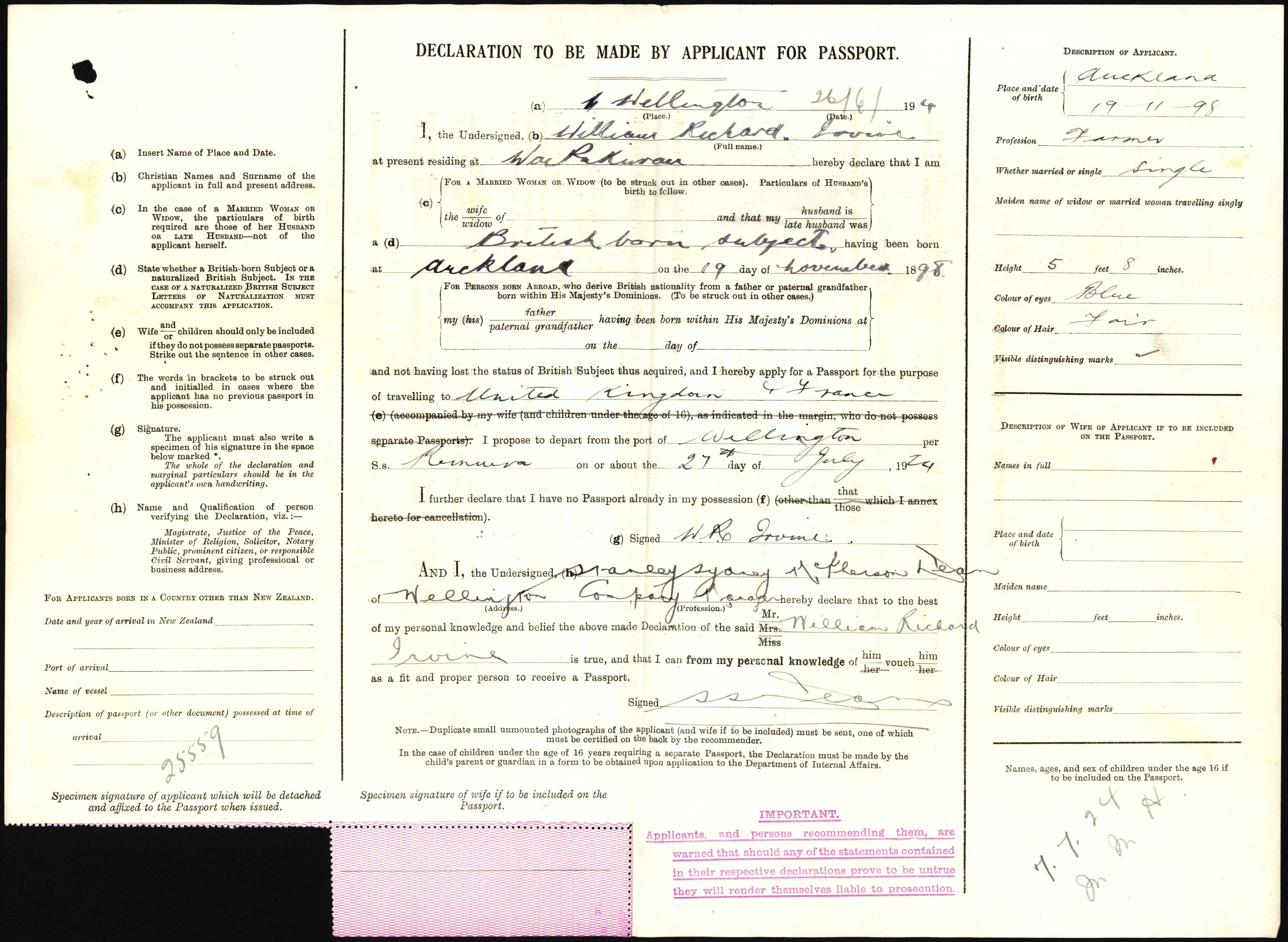
William Irvine passport application (1924)
