= Mick Willoughby =

NZ international rugby union player

- Full name: Stanley de Lar Poer Willoughby
- Born: 21 January 1904 Masterton, New Zealand
- Died: 27 September 1985 (aged 81) Masterton, New Zealand

Rugby union career
- Position: Loose forward
Provincial / State sides
Years	Team	Apps	(Points)
1922–29	Wairarapa	44	
International career
Years	Team	Apps	(Points)
1928	New Zealand		

Stanley de Lar Poer Willoughby (21 January 1904 – 27 September 1985) was a New Zealand international rugby union player of the 1920s.

Willoughby was born in Masterton and educated at Masterton Central School.

A loose forward, Willoughby was a regular in the Wairarapa representative side during the 1920s. He attended the New Zealand trials prior to the 1924–25 tour, but didn't make the squad, then got another opportunity to impress in 1928 when he turned out for the North Island. On this occasion, Willoughby did enough to gain a place in the New Zealand XV for all three of their home fixtures against New South Wales. He also won a Ranfurly Shield with Wairarapa in 1928.

== See also ==
- List of New Zealand national rugby union players
