= Bert Grenside =

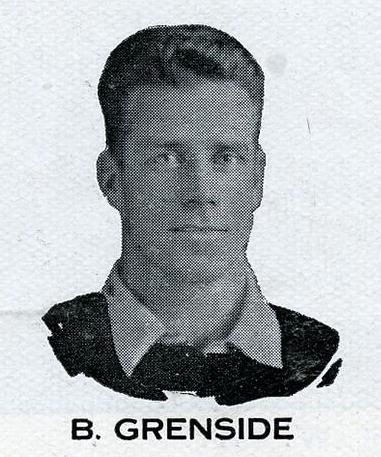
- Born: Bertram Arthur Grenside; 9 April 1899 Hastings, New Zealand
- Died: 2 October 1989 (aged 90) Waipukurau, New Zealand
- Height: 1.83 m (6 ft 0 in)
- Weight: 86 kg (190 lb)
- Occupation: Farmer

Rugby union career
- Position: Wing three-quarter
Provincial / State sides
Years	Team	Apps	(Points)
1919–31	Hawke's Bay	87	(331)
International career
Years	Team	Apps	(Points)
1928–29	New Zealand	6	(9)

Bertram Arthur Grenside (9 April 1899 – 2 October 1989) was a New Zealand rugby union player. A winger, Grenside represented Hawke's Bay at a provincial level. He was a member of the New Zealand national side, the All Blacks, on the 1928 tour of South Africa and 1929 tour of Australia. On those tours, he played 21 matches for the All Blacks, including six internationals, scoring 42 points in all.
