= Hohepa Jacob =

NZ international rugby union player

Hohepa Jacob MC
- Born: 16 November 1894 Levin, New Zealand
- Died: 30 May 1955 (aged 60) Palmerston North, New Zealand
- Height: 1.85 m (6 ft 1 in)
- Weight: 92 kg (203 lb)

Rugby union career
- Position(s): Wing-forward; Loose forward
Provincial / State sides
| Years | Team | Apps | (Points) |
| 1911–1924 | Horowhenua | | |
| 1925–1927 | Manawhenua | | |
International career
| Years | Team | Apps | (Points) |
| 1913–1923 | New Zealand Māori | | |
| 1920 | New Zealand | 8 | (25) |

Hohepa Jacob MC (16 November 1894 – 30 May 1955), also known as Harry Jacob, was a New Zealand rugby union player. A wing-forward and loose forward, Jacob represented Horowhenua and Manawhenua at a provincial level, and was a member of the New Zealand Māori side in 1913, 1914, 1922, and 1923, captaining the team in 1922. He was a member of the New Zealand national team, the All Blacks, on their 1920 tour of New South Wales. He played eight matches on that tour, but did not appear in any Test matches.

During World War I, Jacob served in the New Zealand (Māori) Pioneer Battalion, rising to the rank of 2nd lieutenant. He was awarded the Military Cross in the 1919 King's Birthday Honours, and received the medal from the governor-general, Lord Jellicoe, during a vice-regal visit to Levin in November 1921.
