= Ian Irvine (rugby union) =

Ian Irvine MNZM
- Born: Ian Bruce Irvine; 6 March 1929 Carterton, New Zealand
- Died: 5 November 2013 (aged 84) Whangārei, New Zealand
- Height: 1.75 m (5 ft 9 in)
- Weight: 84 kg (185 lb)
- School: Whangarei Boys' High School
- Notable relative: William Irvine (father)
- Occupation: Farmer

Rugby union career
- Position: Hooker
Provincial / State sides
Years	Team	Apps	(Points)
1949–1953	North Auckland	31	
International career
Years	Team	Apps	(Points)
1952	New Zealand	1	(0)

Ian Bruce Irvine MNZM (6 March 1929 – 5 November 2013) was a New Zealand rugby union player. A hooker, Irvine represented North Auckland at a provincial level. He played a single match for the New Zealand national side, the All Blacks, a test against Australia in 1952.

In the 2000 New Year Honours, Irvine was appointed a Member of the New Zealand Order of Merit, for services to the disabled.
