= Walter Reside =

- Born: Walter Brown Reside; 6 October 1905 Masterton, New Zealand
- Died: 3 May 1985 (aged 79) Masterton, New Zealand
- Height: 1.88 m (6 ft 2 in)
- Weight: 90 kg (200 lb)
- Occupation: Driver

Rugby union career
- Position: Loose forward
Provincial / State sides
| Years | Team | Apps | (Points) |
| 1925–33 | Wairarapa | | |
International career
| Years | Team | Apps | (Points) |
| 1928 | New Zealand Māori | | |
| 1929 | New Zealand | 1 | (0) |

Walter Brown "Wattie" Reside (6 October 1905 – 3 May 1985) was a New Zealand rugby union player. A loose forward, Reside represented Wairarapa at a provincial level, and was a member of the New Zealand national side, the All Blacks, on their 1929 tour of Australia. He played six matches for the All Blacks on that tour, including one international. Of Ngāti Kahungunu descent, Reside also represented New Zealand Māori.
