= Mark Nicholls (rugby union) =

New Zealand rugby union player (1901–1972)

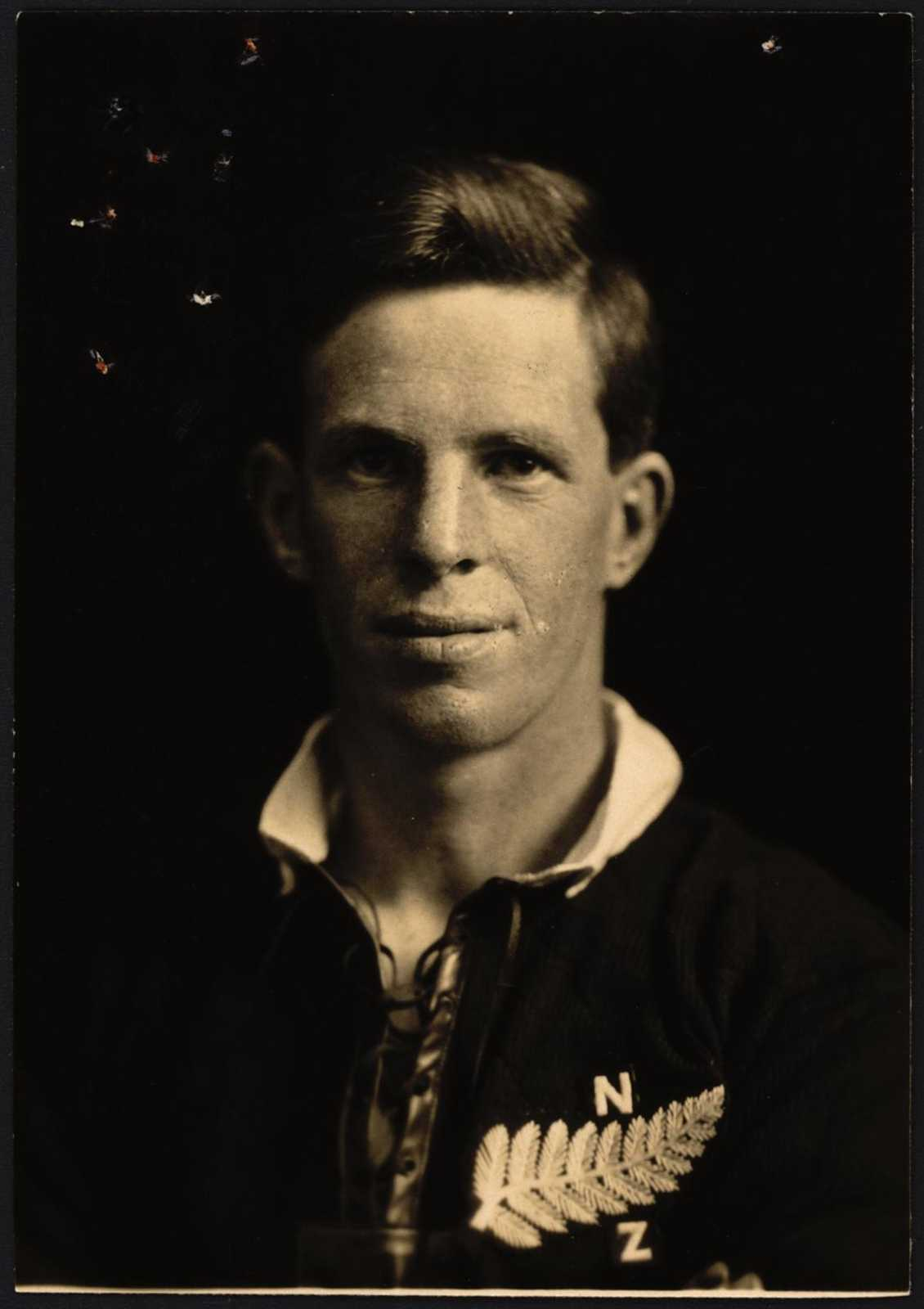
- Nicholls in 1924
- Born: Marcus Frederick Nicholls; 13 July 1901 Wellington, New Zealand
- Died: 10 June 1972 (aged 70) Tauranga, New Zealand
- School: Petone District High School, Wellington College
- Notable relative(s): Ginger Nicholls (brother); Harold Nicholls (brother)

Rugby union career
- Position: Fiveeights
International career
Years	Team	Apps	(Points)
1921–30	New Zealand		

Marcus Frederick Nicholls (13 July 1901 – 10 June 1972), generally known as Mark Nicholls, was a New Zealand rugby union player and selector. He played for New Zealand—the All Blacks—as well as Wellington and the North Island. A member of the legendary 1924–25 All Black "Invincibles", Nicholls was best known as a first five-eighth though he actually played many games, including Tests, at either second-five eighth or centre. Hugely influential in his day, he has largely become forgotten in modern times although George Nēpia and Bert Cooke, two of his better-remembered contemporaries, acknowledged the significance of his role in assisting their success.

== Background ==
Mark was born to a noted sporting family from Petone. His father Syd was a co-founder of the Poneke Football Club in Wellington in 1883, his brothers Harold "Doc" and Harry "Ginger" were briefly All Blacks in the early 1920s, while his sister Dulcie won several national tennis titles during the 1930s. Mark began playing rugby as a hooker at Petone West Primary School. He was moved into the backs by coach Jimmy Lynskey at Petone District High School, and he captained the 1st XV at age 15. In 1917 he transferred to Wellington College where he went straight into the 1st XV, captaining the team in 1918 and 1919. Upon completing school, he returned to Petone to play for the local club's senior team. His performances were so eye-catching he was almost immediately selected to play provincially for Wellington where he made such an impression he was drafted into the All Blacks for the Test series against the touring Springboks in 1921.

== Influence as a player ==
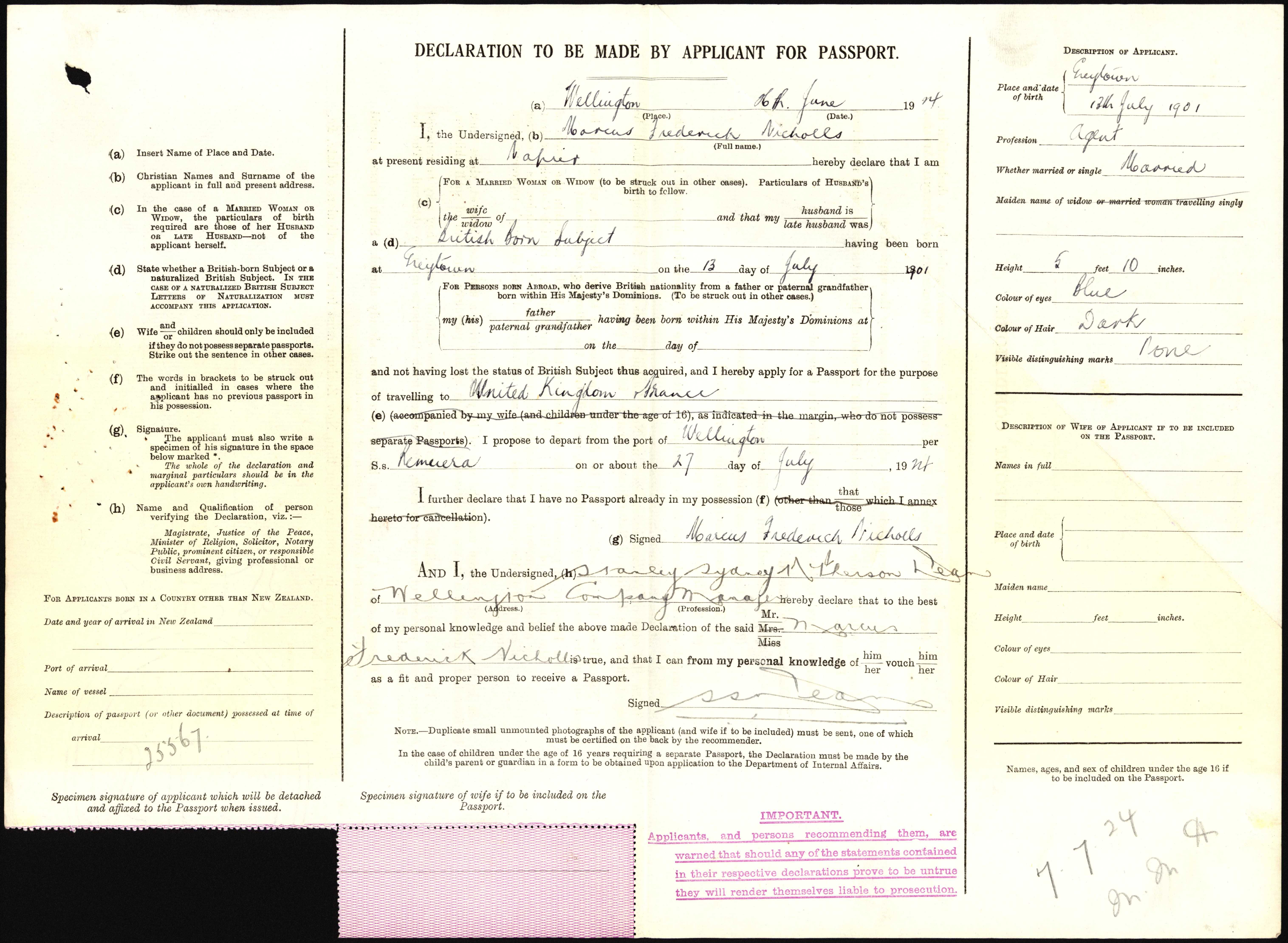
Marcus Nicholls passport application (1924)

Though he only played 10 Tests between 1921 and 1930, Nicholls' influence ran deep particularly in positional kicking and in general play. George Nēpia recalled that he "plays his rugby as other people play chess, by a series of openings which are aimed at an end result utterly confusing to the other side." Springbok legend and rival fly-half, Bennie Osler regarded him as "the best fly-half I ever played against" even though he only ever faced Nicholls once in a 10-year international career. The match Osler was referring to was the Fourth Test between New Zealand and South Africa in Newlands in 1928 which saw Nicholls out-Osler Osler himself with his positional kicking in the wet and muddy conditions. Nicholls then went on to score all his team's points and ensure a surprise 13–5 victory for the All Blacks to square the series at 2–2, the best result for New Zealand in South Africa for 68 years. The normally taciturn Springbok coach "Boy" De Villiers was moved enough by the performance to note that: "Like the (South African) forwards and Bennie won the first Test match, so did the (All Black) forwards and Nicholls win the last Test match."

=== Midfield general ===
Though not a great try scorer himself, Nicholls managed only 5 in 51 games as an All Black, it was his ability to set up his outside backs to score that saw teammates like Bert Cooke profit; "Mark baked the cake, and Bert iced it." This ability was never more apparent than on the Invincible All Blacks tour of Great Britain and France in 1924/5. Often Nicholls' style of play was to run across the field on a diagonal feigning to pass to one teammate or another looking for a weakness in the opposition's back-line. Once one was spotted, he would pass to a teammate and set him free into the gap. To the forward play obsessed British, it was a tactic they found almost blasphemous – although John Wisden's rugby Football Almanac was impressed enough to name Nicholls one of their Players of the Year and even credited him with being responsible for most of the All Blacks' tries.

== Controversial nature ==
Perhaps one of the reasons Nicholls played so few Tests was due to his personality. Described variously as "outspoken" and "coarse" he was also known to be conceited, regarding himself as "the only player who was ever any good." This abrasive nature may have contributed to his being overlooked for the first three Tests of the monumental four match Series against the 1928 Springboks. The South Africans themselves were baffled as to why Nicholls had not been selected before the decisive Fourth Test with their tactical genius Bennie Osler musing: "Why this player was so consistently overlooked throughout the tour I will never know, but we Springboks were certainly grateful that Mark did not get more opportunities against us."

=== Behaving badly ===
Nicholls certainly had form for obnoxious behaviour; an altercation with a rugby official on the 1922 tour of New South Wales had seen him ignored for All Black selection altogether the following year. Journalist Graham Beamish, who toured Britain with the Invincibles, later had a theory that certain teammates harboured resentments from that 1924 tour where the British press had repeatedly praised Mark Nicholls as the "brains" of the team. And that these resentments had resurfaced again on the 1928 tour with the former teammates now using their status as senior players to block Nicholls' place in the side via "persistent selection of players who had not the genius of Nicholls."

=== A brilliant comeback ===
But these resentments were forced to give way to desperation after the third Test of the tour with South Africa having taken an unassailable 2–1 lead in the series. The senior players relented on their policy of non-selection for Nicholls and brought him in from the cold to try and square the series. Mark repaid their contrition by scoring all the All Blacks' 13 points in a virtually single-handed demolition of the Springboks in the Fourth Test to spare his fellow New Zealanders' blushes.

=== Method to the madness ===
George Nēpia certainly saw method to Nicholls' caustic madness, claiming that in team meetings en route to Britain in 1924 Mark's overt criticism of his play had been to deliberately get "a rise out of me so that I shall start thinking of fullback play, deeply and earnestly. That is Mark – thinking ahead, always thinking." This approach of playing mind games with his teammates certainly seemed to have paid off with around 90% of the matches involving Mark Nicholls as an All Black ending in victory.

Nicholls in 1924.

== Later career ==
Nicholls went on to be a Wellington and North Island Selector throughout the 1930s and also played cricket to Senior Club level. After a stint working for New Zealand Railways, he became a publican at several hotels around the country before retiring to Tauranga where he died in 1972. A son, Mark Junior, also played for Petone and made one appearance for Wellington Province.

== Legacy ==
It is difficult to pinpoint just how influential Nicholls has been to the All Blacks' style of play down the decades as even the exploits of other players such as; George Nēpia, Bert Cooke, Billy Wallace, Dave Gallaher and Billy Stead have been lost to modern fans. Some modern rugby writers still rate Mark Nicholls as 'amongst the greatest All Black first five-eighths ever to play.' Perhaps Grant Fox was the last All Black first five eighth to show a similar kicking game and chess player-like thinking on the football field. But there is no shortage whatsoever of modern All Blacks who share the same determination to win as Marcus Frederick Nicholls.
