= Chertsey, New Zealand =

Town in Canterbury, New Zealand

Chertsey
- Rural locality
- Interactive map of Chertsey
- Coordinates: 43°48′S 171°56′E
- Country: New Zealand
- Region: Canterbury
- Territorial authority: Ashburton District
- Ward: Eastern
- Electorates: Rangitata; Te Tai Tonga (Māori)

Government
  - Territorial authority: Ashburton District Council
  - Regional council: Environment Canterbury
  - Mayor of Ashburton: Liz McMillan
  - Rangitata MP: James Meager
  - Te Tai Tonga MP: Mananui Ramsden

Area
  - Total: 69.49 km^{2} (26.83 sq mi)

Population (2023 census)
  - Total: 237
  - Density: 3.41/km^{2} (8.83/sq mi)

Chertsey is a town in the Ashburton District, of New Zealand's South Island. It is located close to State Highway 1, which bypasses the town to the west, between Ashburton and Rakaia on the Canterbury Plains.

== History ==
=== European settlement ===
In 1872 the first Crown land grant was opened and the following year W.A. Brown took up land in Chertsey. He would name the district Chertsey after the town in England where his wife was born and where he had lived. In 1876 Thomas Wilkinson took up land in the district, and the following year the village was surveyed and officially named Chertsey. A 21-room hotel was built along with a blacksmith and a post office. This was shortly followed by a butcher's shop, two general stores, a bakery and a coal and timber yard.

=== Oil drilling ===
The Canterbury Petroleum Prospecting Company started drilling for oil in 1914 and it was ceased in 1921. Oil was found at 420 metres below at Chertsey 1. In September 1921 a drill bit had broken down the well and with the sandy ground surrounding the well they were unable to retrieve it. In the late 1960s J.D. George 1 well was drilled about 10 km south of Chertsey 1, oil seepages were found at 1650 metres but this well was discontinued.

=== The fire of 1926 ===
"The Big Fire" of 1926 had devastating effects on the Chertsey district. The fire was caused by a train starting at the Chertsey township and travelled 20 km to the coast. When it reached Taverners Road several kilometres from its start point the front of the fire was over 3 km wide. One local farmer lost his life while trying to plough a fire break when he was overcome by the speed of the fast moving fire. Many of the districts farms lost a significant amount of livestock. The Minister of Railways at the time was reluctant to acknowledge responsibility, but on the intervention of Prime Minister Gordon Coates payment for about half of the assessed damaged was received.

=== Post World War II ===
By the 1960s only the Chertsey general store, Chertsey Hotel and the Agricultural engineering manufacture remained in the community. Following transport advances and with the development of large supermarkets in nearby Ashburton, Chertsey store was forced to close in the 1990s. The Chertsey Tavern closed its doors in 2013 leaving Chertsey's second hand bookstore the only remaining business.

With New Zealand's dairy industry boom, Chertsey has seen large population growths, with many farms converting from sheep and mixed farming to dairying.

== Demographics ==
Chertsey locality covers 69.49 km^{2} (26.83 sq mi). It is part of the Chertsey statistical area.

Historical population for Chertsey locality
Year	Pop.	±% p.a.
2006	201	—
2013	216	+1.03%
2018	243	+2.38%
2023	237	−0.50%

Chertsey locality had a population of 237 in the 2023 New Zealand census, a decrease of 6 people (−2.5%) since the 2018 census, and an increase of 21 people (9.7%) since the 2013 census. There were 114 males, 126 females, and 3 people of other genders in 81 dwellings. 1.3% of people identified as LGBTIQ+. There were 48 people (20.3%) aged under 15 years, 39 (16.5%) aged 15 to 29, 117 (49.4%) aged 30 to 64, and 36 (15.2%) aged 65 or older.

People could identify as more than one ethnicity. The results were 88.6% European (Pākehā); 11.4% Māori; 1.3% Pasifika; 5.1% Asian; 1.3% Middle Eastern, Latin American and African New Zealanders (MELAA); and 5.1% other, which includes people giving their ethnicity as "New Zealander". English was spoken by 100.0%, Māori by 1.3%, Samoan by 1.3%, and other languages by 7.6%. No language could be spoken by 2.5% (e.g. too young to talk). New Zealand Sign Language was known by 1.3%. The percentage of people born overseas was 12.7, compared with 28.8% nationally.

Religious affiliations were 29.1% Christian, 2.5% Hindu, 1.3% Islam, and 2.5% other religions. People who answered that they had no religion were 57.0%, and 8.9% of people did not answer the census question.

Of those at least 15 years old, 27 (14.3%) people had a bachelor's or higher degree, 114 (60.3%) had a post-high school certificate or diploma, and 51 (27.0%) people exclusively held high school qualifications. 12 people (6.3%) earned over $100,000 compared to 12.1% nationally. The employment status of those at least 15 was 111 (58.7%) full-time and 30 (15.9%) part-time.

=== Chertsey statistical area ===
Chertsey statistical area covers 572.52 km^{2} (221.05 sq mi) and had an estimated population of 1,750 as of June 2025, with a population density of 3.1 people per km^{2}.

Historical population for the statistical area
Year	Pop.	±% p.a.
2006	1,422	—
2013	1,602	+1.72%
2018	1,611	+0.11%
2023	1,563	−0.60%

Chertsey statistical area had a population of 1,563 in the 2023 New Zealand census, a decrease of 48 people (−3.0%) since the 2018 census, and a decrease of 39 people (−2.4%) since the 2013 census. There were 831 males, 729 females, and 3 people of other genders in 588 dwellings. 1.2% of people identified as LGBTIQ+. The median age was 36.7 years (compared with 38.1 years nationally). There were 354 people (22.6%) aged under 15 years, 279 (17.9%) aged 15 to 29, 744 (47.6%) aged 30 to 64, and 189 (12.1%) aged 65 or older.

People could identify as more than one ethnicity. The results were 77.4% European (Pākehā); 8.3% Māori; 1.3% Pasifika; 16.5% Asian; 1.7% Middle Eastern, Latin American and African New Zealanders (MELAA); and 2.7% other, which includes people giving their ethnicity as "New Zealander". English was spoken by 96.4%, Māori by 1.3%, Samoan by 0.2%, and other languages by 12.3%. No language could be spoken by 2.3% (e.g. too young to talk). New Zealand Sign Language was known by 0.8%. The percentage of people born overseas was 24.6, compared with 28.8% nationally.

Religious affiliations were 38.4% Christian, 1.7% Hindu, 0.6% Islam, 0.6% Māori religious beliefs, 1.2% Buddhist, 0.2% New Age, and 1.5% other religions. People who answered that they had no religion were 50.7%, and 5.4% of people did not answer the census question.

Of those at least 15 years old, 210 (17.4%) people had a bachelor's or higher degree, 687 (56.8%) had a post-high school certificate or diploma, and 309 (25.6%) people exclusively held high school qualifications. The median income was $53,300, compared with $41,500 nationally. 138 people (11.4%) earned over $100,000 compared to 12.1% nationally. The employment status of those at least 15 was 762 (63.0%) full-time, 192 (15.9%) part-time, and 15 (1.2%) unemployed.

== Education ==
Chertsey School is a contributing primary school catering for years 1 to 6. It has 36 students as of July 2026. The school opened in 1878.

== Sports ==
Chertsey Domain has held the majority of Chertsey community sports since the late 1800s.

Rugby union was first played in the late 1880s. This continued up until World War 1.

Rugby League is the only current team sport representing Chertsey, the Chertsey Oilers currently play in the Aoraki Rugby League competition.

Softball was played in Chertsey in the late 1990s, with the "Chertsey Chuckers" competing in the Ashburton Softball competition.

Cricket was set up in the 1970s and was a regular feature at the Chertsey domain throughout the 1970s.

Harness racing is a popular sport in the district, and in 1994 Chertsey trainer Colin Calvert won the New Zealand Trotting Cup with Bee Bee Cee, Greyhound racing is also held at the Chertsey domain greyhound track.

== Notable residents ==
- Patrick "Peter" Harvey (3 April 1880 – 29 October 1949), Played rugby union for both the Chertsey and Rakaia clubs. Selected for the All Blacks, gaining a test cap against the touring Great Britain side in 1904.
- Clinton Stringfellow (26 February 1905 – 4 January 1959), born in Chertsey. In 1905 Stringfellow was a member of the New Zealand national side, on their 1929 tour of Australia. On that tour, he played seven matches, including two internationals, scoring 16 points.
- William Lister, 1935 and 1938 New Zealand Light heavyweight champion first winning the title in 1935. Lister again won the title by beating his brother, Tom, in 1938.
- Tom Lister, 1938 New Zealand light heavyweight champion, son Tom Lister was a New Zealand rugby union representative playing 8 test matches for the All Blacks from 1969 to 1971. Another son, John, was a professional golfer.
- Catherine "Kate" Wilkinson (born 3 August 1957) was a member of the New Zealand House of Representatives for the National Party from 2005 until her retirement in 2014.

== Climate ==
Climate data for Chertsey (1991–2020)
Month	Jan	Feb	Mar	Apr	May	Jun	Jul	Aug	Sep	Oct	Nov	Dec	Year
Mean daily maximum °C (°F)	21.6 (70.9)	21.7 (71.1)	19.4 (66.9)	16.5 (61.7)	14.2 (57.6)	11.2 (52.2)	11.0 (51.8)	11.9 (53.4)	14.1 (57.4)	16.2 (61.2)	17.9 (64.2)	19.8 (67.6)	16.3 (61.3)
Daily mean °C (°F)	16.3 (61.3)	16.4 (61.5)	14.5 (58.1)	11.7 (53.1)	9.5 (49.1)	6.7 (44.1)	6.3 (43.3)	7.4 (45.3)	9.2 (48.6)	11.2 (52.2)	12.8 (55.0)	14.8 (58.6)	11.4 (52.5)
Mean daily minimum °C (°F)	11.0 (51.8)	11.0 (51.8)	9.6 (49.3)	6.8 (44.2)	4.7 (40.5)	2.2 (36.0)	1.7 (35.1)	2.8 (37.0)	4.4 (39.9)	6.1 (43.0)	7.6 (45.7)	9.8 (49.6)	6.5 (43.7)
Average rainfall mm (inches)	51.5 (2.03)	48.4 (1.91)	54.0 (2.13)	70.9 (2.79)	70.4 (2.77)	70.1 (2.76)	66.7 (2.63)	67.2 (2.65)	57.5 (2.26)	54.2 (2.13)	59.3 (2.33)	53.2 (2.09)	723.4 (28.48)
Source: NIWA
