= Herb Lilburne =

NZ dual-code international rugby footballer

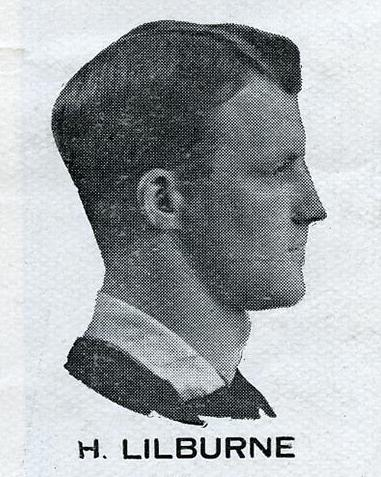

Personal information
- Full name: Herbert Theodore Lilburne
- Born: 16 March 1908; Burnham, New Zealand
- Died: 12 June 1976 (aged 68); Dunedin, New Zealand

Playing information
- Weight: 12 st 2 lb (77 kg)

Rugby union
- Position: Fullback, Centre, Fly-half
Club
Years	Team	Pld	T	G	FG	P
1928–30	Marist Albion RFC
Representative
Years	Team	Pld	T	G	FG	P
1926–30	Canterbury	20
1930–≤35	Wellington	22
1927–29	South Island	2
1931–33	North Island	3
1928–34	New Zealand	10	0	0	2	4

Rugby league
- Position: Wing
Representative
Years	Team	Pld	T	G	FG	P
≤1935–≥35	Wellington
1935	New Zealand	1	0	0	0	0

Coaching information
Club
Years	Team	Gms	W	D	L	W%
	Zingari-Richmond

Herbert Theodore Lilburne (16 March 1908 – 12 June 1976) was a New Zealand dual-code international rugby union and professional rugby league footballer who played in the 1920s and 1930s, and coached rugby union in the 1940s.

== Background ==
Lilburne was born in Burnham, New Zealand.

== Rugby union and rugby league career ==
Herb Lilburne played representative level rugby union (RU) for New Zealand, South Island, North Island, Canterbury and Wellington, and at club level for Marist Albion RFC, as a Fullback, Centre, or Fly-half.

Lilburne played for New Zealand in:

- 1928 against South Africa (2 tests and 12 other matches). He also played for New Zealand in a game against Victoria, at Melbourne on the way home, won by 58 points to 9.
- 1929 against Australia (3 tests and 5 other matches). Following the injuries to the New Zealand captain Cliff Porter, and vice-captain Bill Dalley, Herb Lilburne was appointed captain for the first test and at 21-years and 112-days he is the youngest New Zealand test captain to date. New Zealand lost that match 9 points to 8 but he captained New Zealand in two further games, against New South Wales (a 22–9 win) and an Australian XV (won 25–4). Cliff Porter took over again as captain in the second and third test matches which were both lost, 9-17 and 13–15.
- 1930 against the British Lions during their New Zealand tour (2 tests). He also played for New Zealand in a prior match against North Otago, coming on as a reserve to replace Don Oliver.
- 1931 against Australia, won by 20 points to 13 at Auckland.
- 1932 against Australia (1 test and 6 other matches). He also played for New Zealand in a pre-tour match against Wellington that was lost by 23 points to 36.
- 1934 against Australia (1 test and 4 other matches).

He was selected by the editors of the 1935 Rugby Almanac of New Zealand as one of their 5 players of the year in 1934.

Lilburne was not selected for the 1935 tour of Britain and he switched to rugby league. He played representative level rugby league for New Zealand and Wellington as a winger, Lilburne won a cap for New Zealand (RL) in the 8–29 defeat by Australia at Carlaw Park on 2 October 1935.

He lived his later years in Dunedin and after having been reinstated from rugby league in the World War II amnesty, Lilburne coached club level rugby union for the Zingari-Richmond Rugby Club.
