= Jackie Blake =

- Full name: John Muldoon Blake
- Born: 21 June 1902 Hastings, New Zealand
- Died: 11 May 1988 (aged 85) Hastings, New Zealand
- Height: 175 cm (5 ft 9 in)
- Weight: 70 kg (154 lb)
- School: St Patrick's College

Rugby union career
- Position: Centre
Provincial / State sides
Years	Team	Apps	(Points)
- Hawke's Bay
International career
Years	Team	Apps	(Points)
1925–26	New Zealand		

John Muldoon Blake (21 June 1902 — 11 May 1988) was a New Zealand international rugby union player.

Born in Hastings, Hawke's Bay, Blake boarded at St Patrick's College and while still a schoolboy appeared for New Zealand Maori against the touring 1921 Springboks.

Blake was a centre three-quarter in the Hawke's Bay side of the 1920s that successfully defended the Ranfurly Shield over five years, forming a midfield partnership with Bert Cooke. He managed 22 tries in Ranfurly Shield matches for Hawke's Bay, including a hat-trick to defeat Otago in 1925.

An All Black in 1925 and 1926, Blake made a total of 13 uncapped appearances, scoring five tries. He featured in tours of Australia both years, playing "international" matches against New South Wales.

== See also ==
- List of New Zealand national rugby union players
