= Alexander Kirkpatrick (rugby union) =

- Born: 4 October 1898 Northern Ireland
- Died: 25 August 1971 (aged 72) Hastings, New Zealand
- School: Woodville District High School

Rugby union career
- Position: Hooker
International career
Years	Team	Apps	(Points)
1925,1926	New Zealand		

Alexander Kirkpatrick OBE (4 October 1898 – 25 August 1971) was an All Blacks rugby union player from New Zealand. He was a hooker. He played 12 matches for the All Blacks in 1925-26 against Australia (New South Wales), scoring 6 points (2 tries).

He was a member of the Hastings club and captained the Hawke’s Bay Region to take the Ranfurly Shield off Wellington in 1922; and appeared in 22 of the 24 successful defences (more than any other player). In 1952-56 he served on the NZRFU Council (1956 as president), and was on the Appeal Council 1957–1971.

He was born in Northern Ireland and died in Hastings, New Zealand. He came to New Zealand young, and was educated at Woodville District High School.

He was deputy mayor of Hastings for 18 years, and was chairman of the Hawke’s Bay Harbour Board. He was Chancellor of the New Zealand Red Cross 1967–71. He was made officer of the Order of the British Empire and was a Knight of the Order of St John.
