= Jimmy Mill =

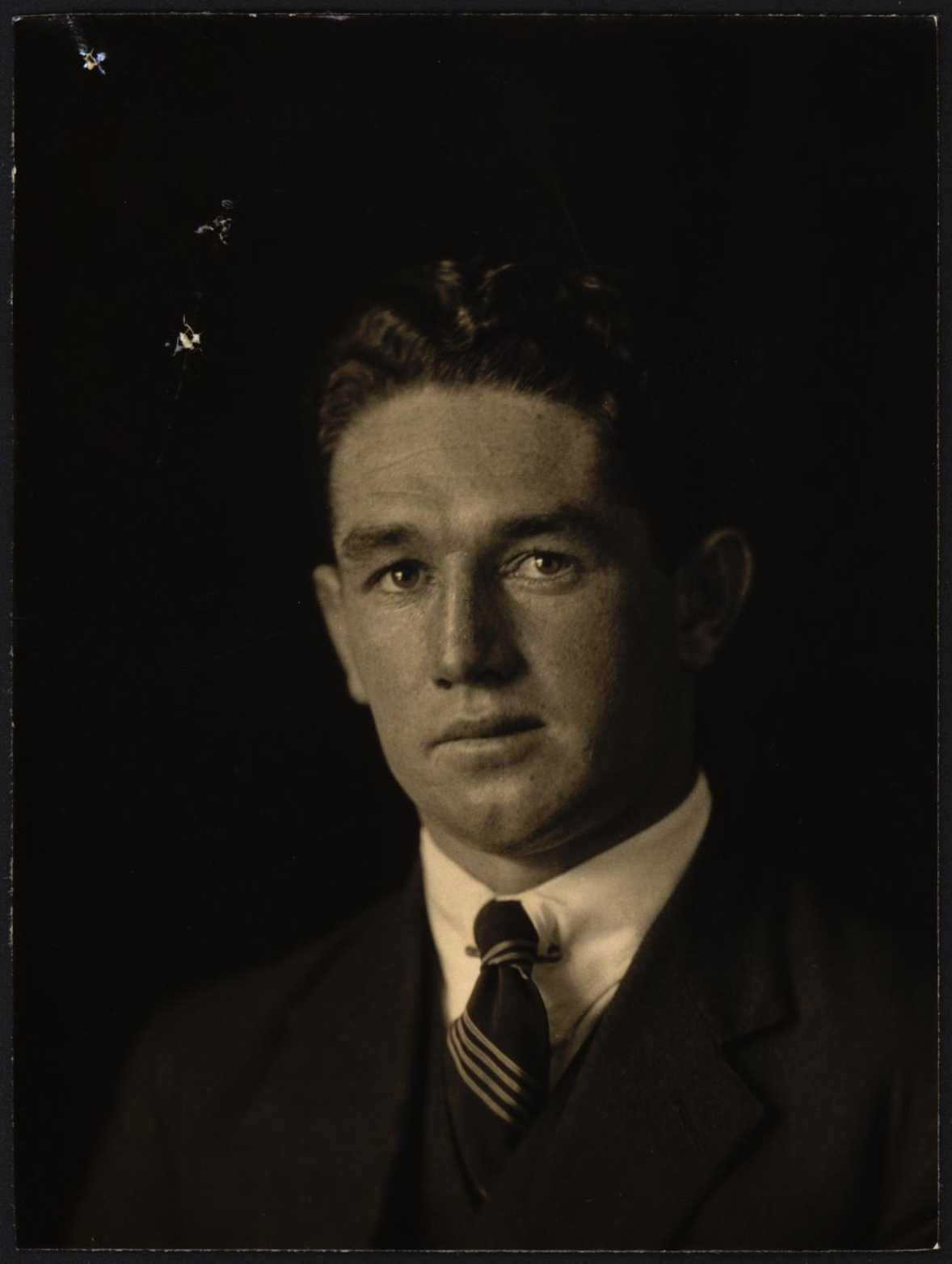
- Born: James Joseph Mill; 19 November 1899 Tokomaru Bay, New Zealand
- Died: 29 March 1950 (aged 50) Gisborne, New Zealand
- Height: 1.70 m (5 ft 7 in)
- Weight: 70 kg (150 lb)
- School: Napier Boys' High School; Nelson College
- Occupation: Sheep farmer

Rugby union career
- Position: Halfback
Provincial / State sides
Years	Team	Apps	(Points)
- East Coast
-	Hawke's Bay	32	
-	Wairarapa	16	
International career
Years	Team	Apps	(Points)
1923–30	New Zealand	4	(0)
1922–23	New Zealand Māori	5	

James Joseph Mill (19 November 1899 – 29 March 1950) was a New Zealand rugby union player. A halfback, Mill represented East Coast, Hawke's Bay and Wairarapa at a provincial level, and was a member of the New Zealand national side, the All Blacks, from 1923 to 1930. He played 33 matches for the All Blacks including four internationals. Of Ngāti Porou descent, Mill played for New Zealand Māori in 1922 and 1923.

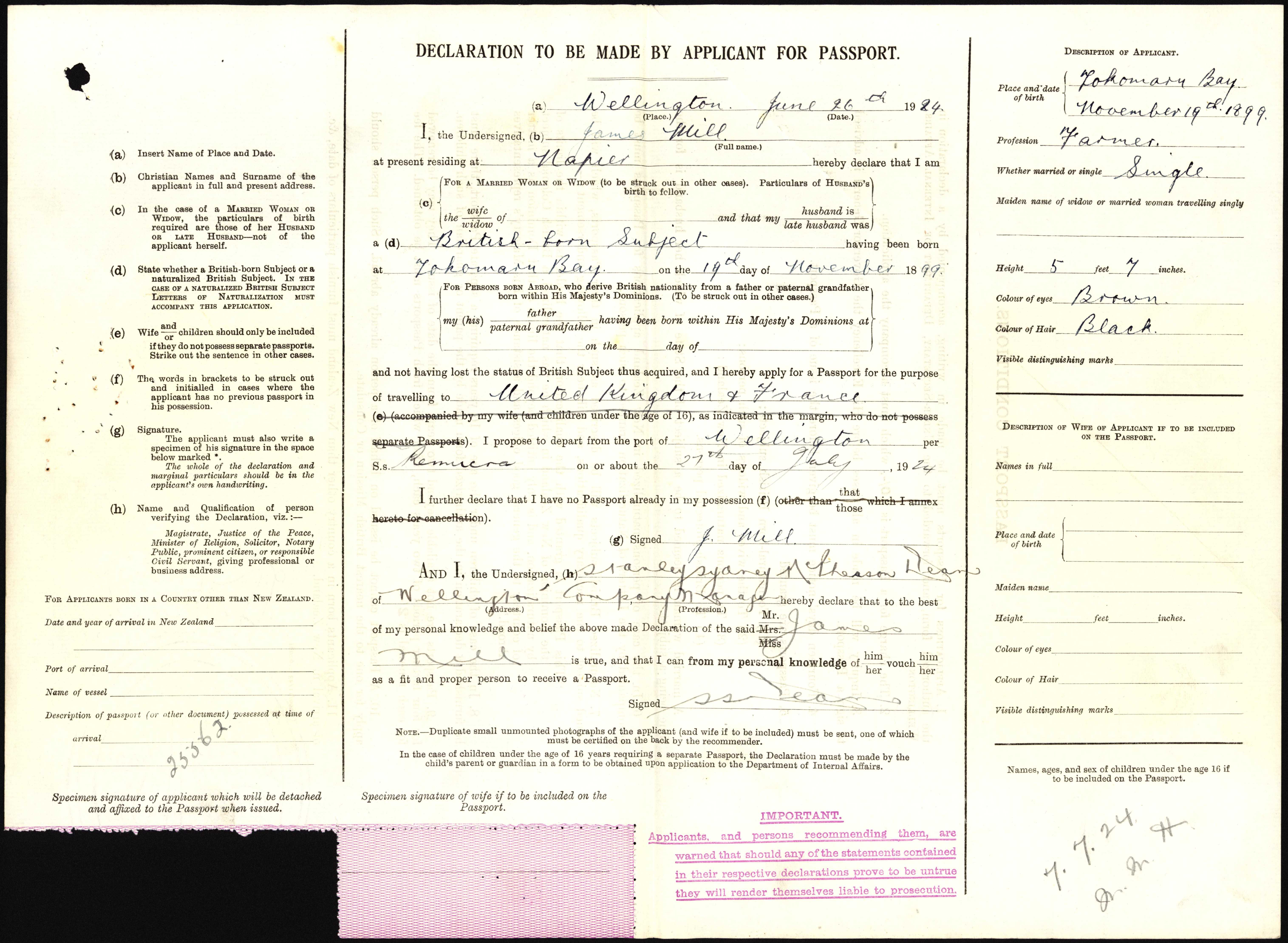
James Mill passport application (1924)
