= Frank Kilby =

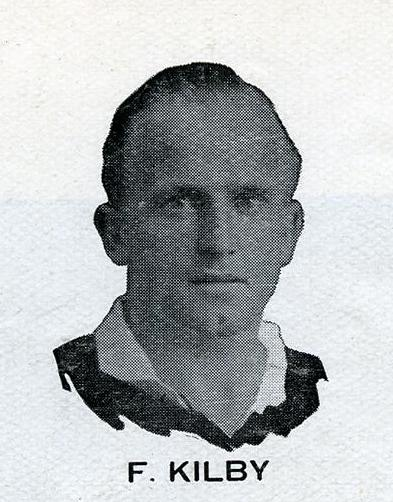
- Born: Francis David Kilby; 24 April 1906 Invercargill, New Zealand
- Died: 3 September 1985 (aged 79) Wellington, New Zealand
- Height: 1.68 m (5 ft 6 in)
- Weight: 69 kg (152 lb)
- School: Southland Boys' High School
- Occupation: Bank officer

Rugby union career
- Position: Halfback
Provincial / State sides
Years	Team	Apps	(Points)
1925–1926	Southland	15	
1927–1935	Wellington	39	
1929	Wanganui		
1929	Taranaki		
International career
Years	Team	Apps	(Points)
1928–1934	New Zealand	4	(3)

Francis David Kilby (24 April 1906 – 3 September 1985) was a New Zealand rugby union player and administrator. A halfback, Kilby represented Southland, Wellington, and briefly Wanganui and Taranaki at a provincial level, and was a member of the New Zealand national side, the All Blacks, from 1928 to 1934. He played 18 matches for the All Blacks, 13 of which were as captain, including four internationals. He later served on the executive of the New Zealand Rugby Union between 1955 and 1974, and managed the New Zealand Māori team on their tour of Australia in 1958, and the All Blacks on the 1963–64 tour of Britain, Ireland, France and North America.
