= Don Oliver (rugby union) =

- Born: Donald Joseph Oliver; 29 April 1909 Dunedin, New Zealand
- Died: 25 June 1990 (aged 81) Hastings, New Zealand
- School: Palmerston North Boys' High School

Rugby union career
- Position: Wing
International career
Years	Team	Apps	(Points)
1930	New Zealand		

Donald Joseph Oliver (29 April 1909 – 25 June 1990) was an All Blacks rugby union player from New Zealand. He was a wing threequarter.

He played three matches including two tests for the All Blacks, scoring 6 points and two tries for New Zealand against the British Lions in 1930.

He played for several provincial sides; Otago, Wellington, Wairarapa, Waikato, and Southland. He was a selector for Horowhenua 1948-50 and Manawatu-Horowhenua 1949–50.

He was born in Dunedin and died in Hastings.
