= John Swain (rugby union) =

New Zealand rugby union player

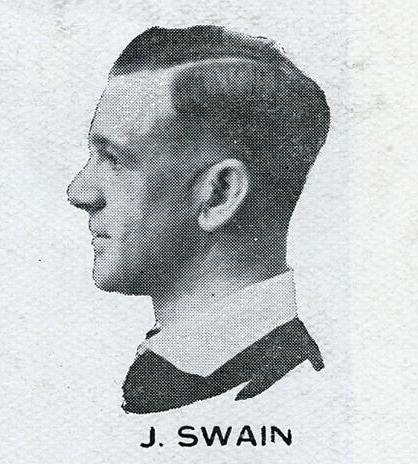
- Born: John Patterson Swain; 23 October 1899 Sydney, New South Wales, Australia
- Died: 29 August 1960 (aged 60) Eskdale, New Zealand
- Height: 1.70 m (5 ft 7 in)
- Weight: 82 kg (181 lb)
- School: Napier Technical College

Rugby union career
- Position: Hooker
Provincial / State sides
| Years | Team | Apps | (Points) |
| 1920–21, 1925–28 | Hawke's Bay | | |
| 1922–1924 | Wellington | | |
International career
| Years | Team | Apps | (Points) |
| 1928 | New Zealand | 4 | (3) |

John Patterson Swain (23 October 1899 – 29 August 1960) was a New Zealand rugby union player. A hooker, Swain represented Hawke's Bay and Wellington at a provincial level, and was a member of the New Zealand national side, the All Blacks, on their 1928 tour of South Africa. He played 16 matches on that tour, including all four internationals.

Swain attended Napier Technical College.
