= Alfred Eckhold =

Personal information
- Full name: Alfred George Eckhold
- Born: 28 December 1885; Adelaide, South Australia
- Died: 24 October 1931 (aged 45); Dunedin, New Zealand
- Role: Batsman

Domestic team information
- Years: Team
- 1906/07–1921/22: Otago

Career statistics
Competition	First-class
Matches	19
Runs scored	702
Batting average	21.93
100s/50s	0/3
Top score	60*
Balls bowled	146
Wickets	3
Bowling average	25.00
5 wickets in innings	0
10 wickets in match	0
Best bowling	1/5
Catches/stumpings	8/–
- Source: CricketArchive

Alfred Eckhold
- Weight: 66 kg (146 lb)

Rugby union career
- Position: Five-eighth
International career
Years	Team	Apps	(Points)
1907	New Zealand	3	(0)

Alfred George Eckhold (28 December 1885 – 24 October 1931) was an Australian-New Zealand sportsman who played first-class cricket for Otago and represented the All-Blacks at rugby union.

== Career ==
=== Rugby career ===
Eckhold, a 66 kg five-eighth, was originally from Australia and came to New Zealand when he was a teenager. He returned to his country of birth in 1907, with the New Zealand national rugby union team. Eckhold made three appearances on the tour, against NSW in Sydney and twice against Queensland in Brisbane. When back home in New Zealand, Eckhold played with the Southern Rugby Club in Dunedin and for Otago. In the 1920s he was a prominent rugby referee around the country and officiated in some Ranfurly Shield matches. His son in law, Harry Simon, was also an All Black.

=== Cricket career ===
He had made his first-class cricket debut in 1907, when he lined up against the touring Marylebone Cricket Club which was filled with experienced international cricketers. He accounted for himself well though, making 41 in his maiden innings, the second top score for Otago. He seemed to perform well against good opponents as he was again one of his team's best batsmen when they took on the Australian cricket team at Carisbrook in 1910, with innings of 27 and 26.

Four of his first-class matches were in the Plunket Shield

Eckhold made his highest score of 60 not out, against Wellington at Basin Reserve in 1915, after making a duck in the first innings. His effort, coupled with an unbeaten century from captain and England Test cricketer Jack Crawford, allowed Otago to hold on for a draw and it also set an eight wicket record for the team.

== Personal life ==
Eckhold was born at Adelaide in South Australia in 1885. He worked as a maltster. He died, aged 45, at Dunedin in 1931.
