= Sam Gemmell =

- Born: Samuel William Gemmell; 28 August 1896 Mohaka, New Zealand
- Died: 28 June 1970 (aged 73) Wairoa, New Zealand
- School: Maori Agricultural College; Te Aute College

Rugby union career
- Position(s): Loose forward Hooker
Provincial / State sides
Years	Team	Apps	(Points)
1921–31	Hawke's Bay	74	
International career
Years	Team	Apps	(Points)
1922–29	New Zealand Māori	57	
1923	New Zealand	0	(0)

Samuel William Gemmell (28 August 1896 – 28 June 1970) was a New Zealand rugby union player. A loose forward, Gemmell represented Hawke's Bay at a provincial level. He played one match for the New Zealand national side, the All Blacks, out of position at hooker against New South Wales at Dunedin.

Affiliating to Ngāti Pāhauwera, Gemmell played 57 matches for New Zealand Māori between 1922 and 1929, making him the most capped player for that team. He served as a private with the New Zealand (Māori) Pioneer Battalion during World War I, and was selected by ballot to represent Māori returned soldiers as part of the New Zealand military contingent to the coronation of King George VI in 1937. During World War II he served in New Zealand with the Territorial Force.

His uncle, Ben Gemmell, was a New Zealand Māori representative between 1914 and 1921.
