= Kenneth Svenson =

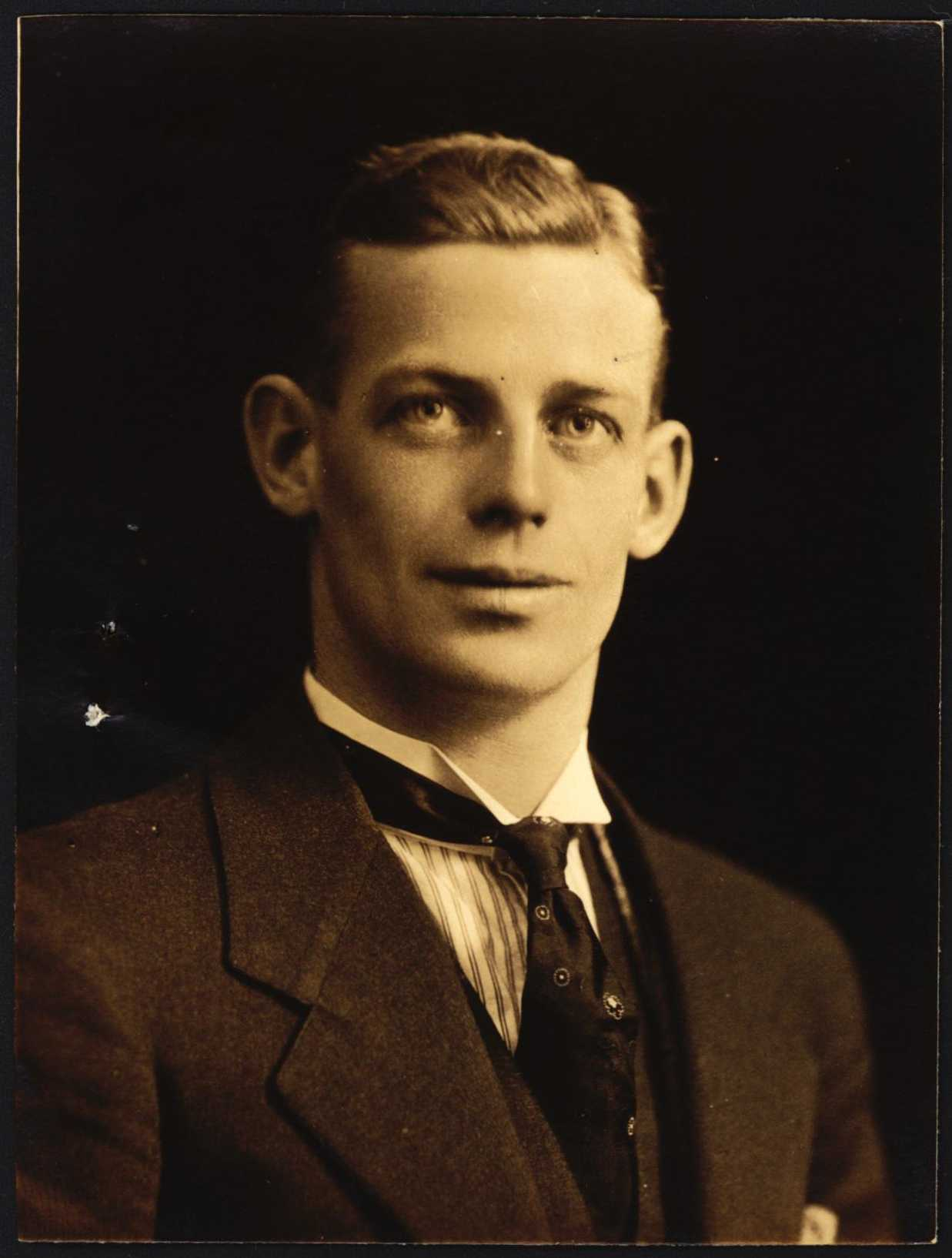
- Born: Kenneth Sidney Svenson; 6 December 1898 Toowoomba, Queensland, Australia
- Died: 7 December 1955 (aged 57) Raglan, New Zealand
- Height: 1.70 m (5 ft 7 in)
- Weight: 69 kg (152 lb)
- Occupation: Dairy farmer

Rugby union career
- Position: Second five-eighth and three-quarter
Provincial / State sides
Years	Team	Apps	(Points)
1918–20	Wanganui		
1921–22	Buller		
1923–27	Wellington		
1932–33	Marlborough	3	
International career
Years	Team	Apps	(Points)
1922–26	New Zealand	4	(12)

Kenneth Sidney "Snowy" Svenson (6 December 1898 – 7 December 1955) was a New Zealand rugby union player. A second five-eighth and three-quarter, Svenson represented Wanganui, Buller, Wellington and Marlborough a provincial level, and was a member of the New Zealand national side, the All Blacks, from 1922 to 1926. He played 34 matches for the All Blacks including four internationals.

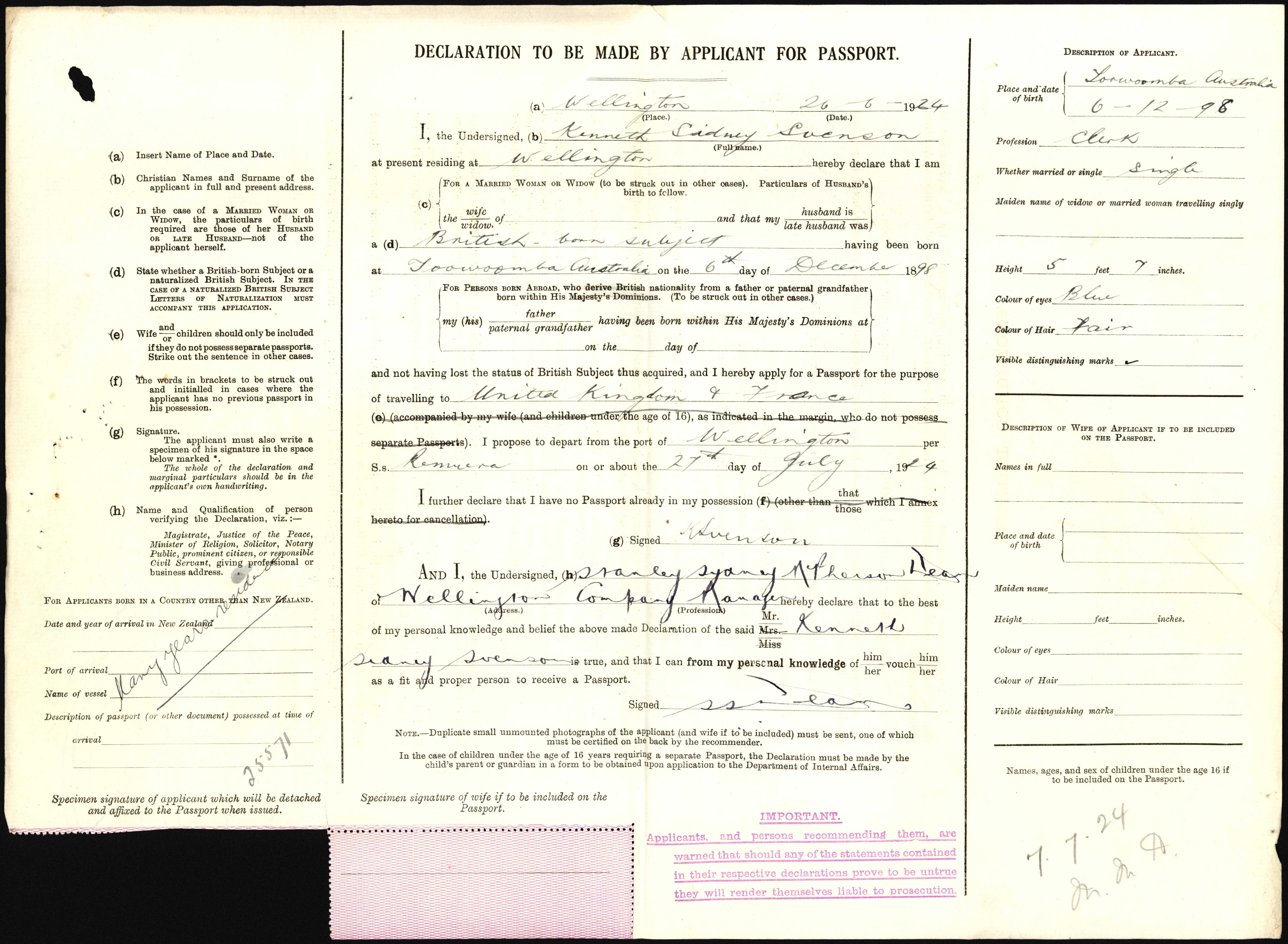
Kenneth Svenson passport application (1924)
