= Fred Tilyard =

- Born: Frederick Joseph Tilyard; 5 July 1896 Waratah, Tasmania, Australia
- Died: 8 February 1954 (aged 57) Whakatāne, New Zealand
- Notable relative(s): James Tilyard (brother); Jack Griffiths (nephew)

Rugby union career
- Position: First five-eighth
Provincial / State sides
| Years | Team | Apps | (Points) |
| 1918–25 | Wellington | 18 | |
International career
| Years | Team | Apps | (Points) |
| 1923 | New Zealand | 0 | (0) |

Frederick Joseph Tilyard (5 July 1896 – 8 February 1954) was a New Zealand rugby union player. A first five-eighth, Tilyard represented Wellington in 18 games at a provincial level between 1918 and 1925. He played just one match for the New Zealand national side, the All Blacks, against the touring New South Wales team at Carisbrook in 1923, in which he scored a try. He did not play in any Test matches.
