= Rawi Cundy =

New Zealand rugby union player

- Born: Rawi Tama Cundy; 15 August 1901 Featherston, New Zealand
- Died: 9 February 1955 (aged 53) Hinakura, New Zealand
- Height: 1.75 m (5 ft 9 in)
- Weight: 80 kg (180 lb)
- School: Nelson College
- Occupation: Farmer

Rugby union career
- Position: Utility back
Provincial / State sides
| Years | Team | Apps | (Points) |
| 1921–29 | Wairarapa | 63 | |
International career
| Years | Team | Apps | (Points) |
| 1929 | New Zealand | 1 | (3) |

Rawi Tama Cundy (15 August 1901 – 9 February 1955) was a New Zealand rugby union player. A utility back, Cundy represented Wairarapa, at provincial level, and was a member of the New Zealand national side, the All Blacks, in 1929. He played six matches for the All Blacks, including one international. In 1927 he became the first player to score 100 points in a New Zealand first-class season.

Cundy was educated at Nelson College from 1916 to 1919.
