= Umberto Calcinai =

- Born: Umberto Primo Calcinai; 2 February 1892 Wellington, New Zealand
- Died: 26 July 1963 (aged 71) Wellington, New Zealand
- Weight: 77 kg (170 lb)

Rugby union career
- Position(s): Wing-forward; Hooker
Provincial / State sides
Years	Team	Apps	(Points)
–1923	Wellington		
International career
Years	Team	Apps	(Points)
1922	New Zealand	0	(0)

Umberto Primo Calcinai (2 February 1892 – 26 July 1963) was a New Zealand rugby union player. Of Italian descent, Calcinai represented Wellington at a provincial level, and was a member of the New Zealand national side, the All Blacks, on their 1922 tour of New South Wales. His preferred playing position was wing-forward, but all five of his matches for the All Blacks on the 1922 tour were as a hooker. Calcinai did not appear in any Test matches.
