= James Tilyard =

New Zealand rugby union player

Jimmy Tilyard
- Born: James Thomas Tilyard; 27 August 1889 Waratah, Tasmania, Australia
- Died: 1 November 1966 (aged 77) Dannevirke, New Zealand
- Notable relative: Fred Tilyard (brother)

Rugby union career
- Position: First five-eighth
Provincial / State sides
Years	Team	Apps	(Points)
1908–11, 13–20	Wellington	43	
1912, 1921	Wanganui	10	
International career
Years	Team	Apps	(Points)
1913–20	New Zealand	1	(0)
- Cricket career

Cricket information
- Batting: Left-handed
- Role: Batsman

Domestic team information
- Years: Team
- 1907–08: Wellington
- Only First-class: 2 April 1908 v Hawke's Bay

Career statistics
Competition	First-class
Matches	1
Runs scored	40
Batting average	20.00
100s/50s	0/0
Top score	31
Catches/stumpings	0/0
- Source: CricketArchive, 14 February 2016

James Thomas Tilyard (27 August 1889 – 1 November 1966) was a New Zealand rugby union player.

Tilyard, Australian born, represented Wellington and Wanganui provincially. He played his club rugby with Poneke. A brother, Fred, was also an All Black while other brothers competed in club rugby at a high level.

He played his only Test match for New Zealand when he took the field as a first five-eighth in an 11-point loss to Australia at Christchurch in 1913. It was more of a second string All-Blacks team as the usual players had already started their tour of Canada when this Test, the final of the series, was played.

Tilyard returned to the national team in 1920 and captained them for a tour of New South Wales. He made nine All Black appearances on the tour, scored four tries and kicked two conversions as well as a drop goal.

The talented sportsman also appeared in one first-class cricket match for Wellington in 1908, against Hawke's Bay in Napier. In a drawn match, Tilyard contributed scores of 31 and nine.
