= Edward Roberts (rugby union) =

New Zealand cricketer and rugby player

Edward James Roberts
- Born: 10 May 1891 Wellington
- Died: 27 February 1972 (aged 80) Wellington
- Height: 1.68 m (5 ft 6 in)
- Weight: 68 kg (150 lb)

Rugby union career
- Position: Half-back
International career
Years	Team	Apps	(Points)
1913–1921	New Zealand	26	(110)

Edward James Roberts (1891–1972) was a New Zealand cricketer: a wicket-keeper who appeared in three first-class matches for Wellington in the 1909–10 season and he also played for the All Blacks from 1913 to 1921.
