= George Nēpia =

New Zealand international rugby footballer (1905–1986)

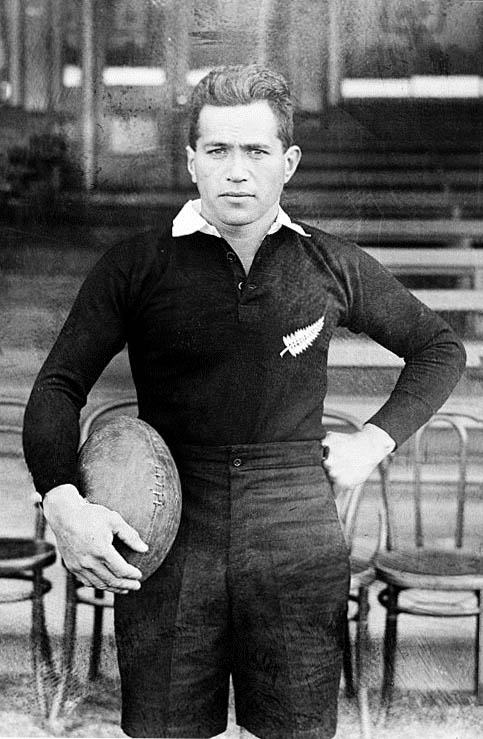
- Nepia in 1935
- Born: George Nēpia; 25 April 1905 Wairoa, Hawke's Bay Region, New Zealand
- Died: 27 June 1986 (aged 81)
- Height: 1.75 m (5 ft 9 in)
- Weight: 82 kg (12 st 13 lb)

Rugby union career
- Position: Fullback
Senior career
Years	Team	Apps	(Points)
1922–25	Hawkes Bay		
1927–47	East Coast		
International career
Years	Team	Apps	(Points)
1924–30	New Zealand	9	(5)
- Rugby league career

Playing information
- Position: Fullback
Club
Years	Team	Pld	T	G	FG	P
1937	Streatham & Mitcham
	Halifax
1937	Hornby	2
1938–1939	Manukau	14	2	8	1	24
	Total	16	2	8	1	24
Representative
Years	Team	Pld	T	G	FG	P
1937	New Zealand Māori	2				20
1937	New Zealand	1				4
	Dominion XIII

George Nēpia (Māori: Hōri Nēpia; 25 April 1905 – 27 August 1986) was a New Zealand Māori rugby union and rugby league player. He is remembered as an exceptional full-back and one of the most famous Māori rugby players. He was inducted into the New Zealand Sports Hall of Fame in 1990. In 2004 he was selected as number 65 by the panel of the New Zealand's Top 100 History Makers television show. Nēpia was featured in a set of postage stamps from the New Zealand post office in 1990. Historian Philippa Mein Smith described him as "New Zealand rugby's first superstar".

== Early life ==
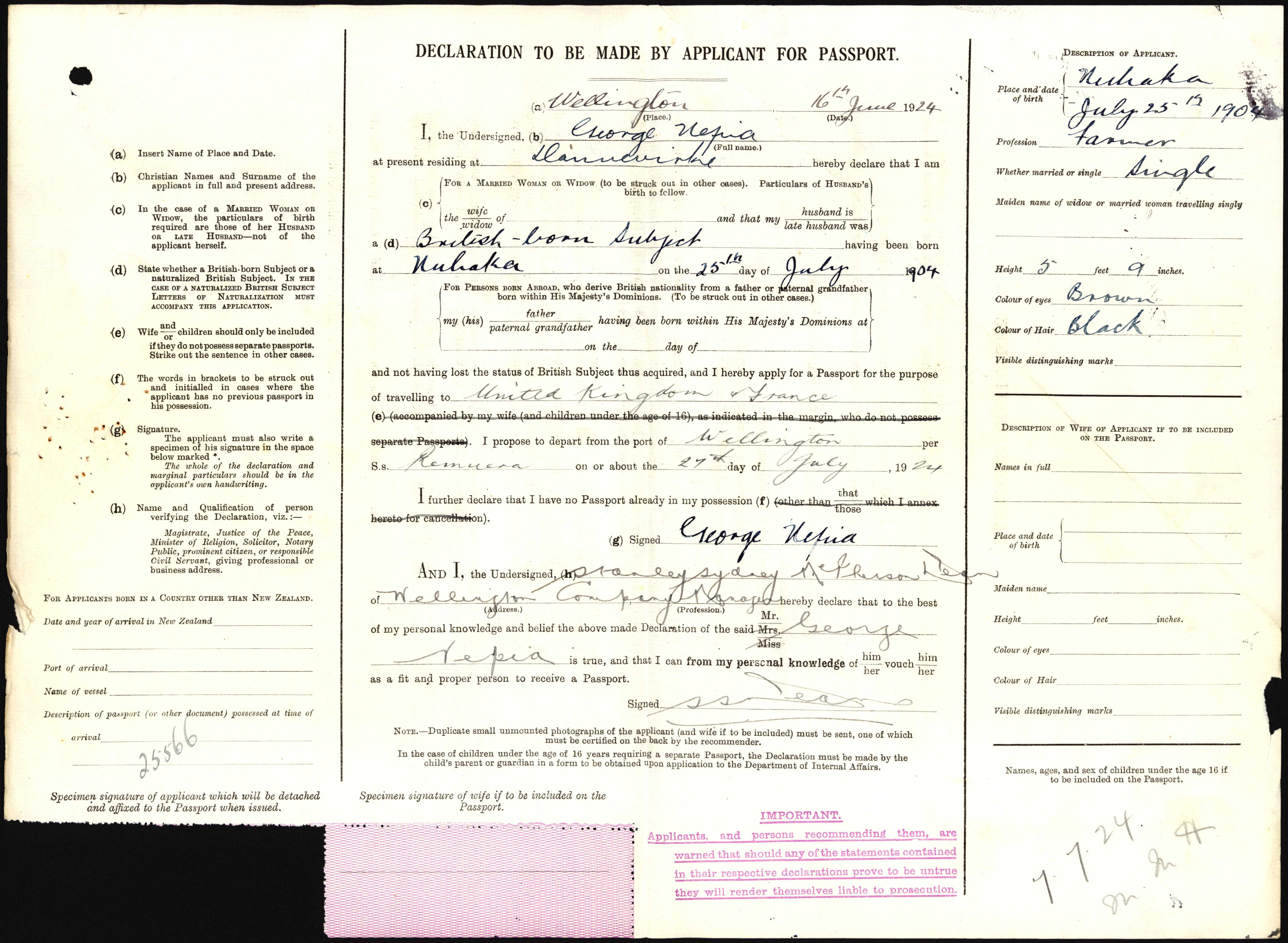
George Nepia passport application, 1924

Nēpia was born in Wairoa, Hawkes Bay with the birth certificate stating he was born in 1905, although a passport application also had his date of birth as 25 July 1904. Nēpia later claimed to have been born in 1908, saying he had put his age up to be eligible for the All Black trials in 1924. According to two rugby historians in a later news item however, Nepia's claim about his date of birth would have meant he played first class rugby at the age of 13, and as this was unlikely, the records would stay.

After finishing primary school in Nūhaka, Nēpia's father sent fees for him to attend Te Aute College but without his father's permission, went instead to the nearby Maori Agricultural College where, according to Nēpia, the coach of the rugby said he would pay his fees if he was "material for the first XV".

In 1926, Nēpia married Huinga Kōhere. Nēpia and his family settled on a Kohere's family farm at Rangitukia on the East Coast. They had four children, three sons and a daughter. One of his sons, George, himself a promising rugby fullback died at the age of 24 while on army service in Malaya.

== Rugby football career ==
Nēpia was selected for the Hawkes Bay provincial rugby team in 1922. At that time Hawkes Bay had one of the strongest teams in New Zealand and held the Ranfurly Shield for twenty four successful defences before losing to Wairarapa in 1927. Nēpia initially played on the wing but was later shifted to second-five eighth.

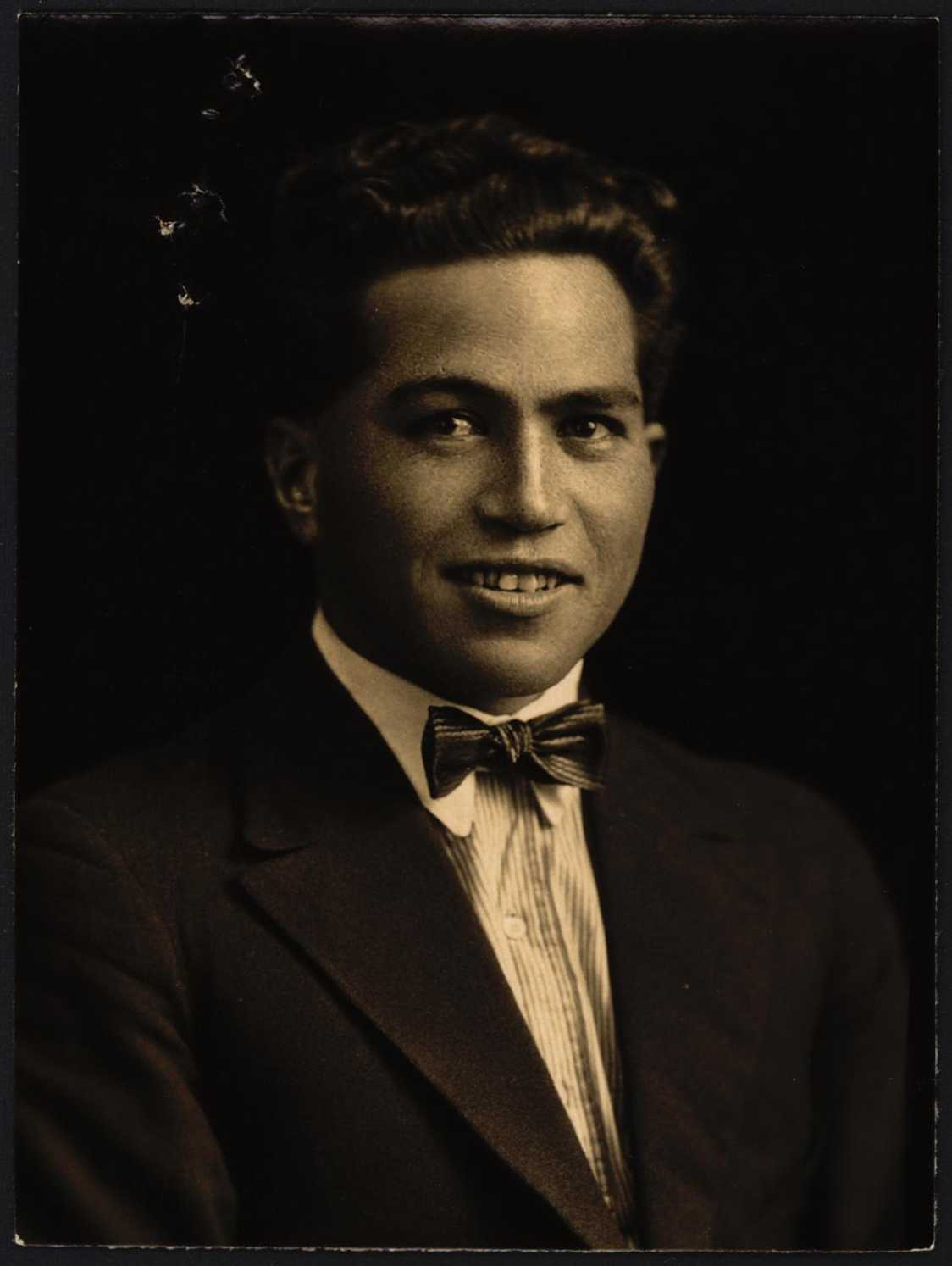
George Nēpia passport photo, (1924)

In 1924 Nēpia was selected as a full-back for the All Blacks tour to the United Kingdom. Nēpia was one of the stars of the tour. He played in all 32 games – being the only player to do so – and scored 77 points. As the team did not lose any matches, they came to be known as The Invincibles. Nēpia played at fullback and before each game, led the team's performance of a haka that had been composed for the tour.

Nēpia was omitted from the 1928 All Blacks tour of South Africa, probably on racial grounds. Nēpia returned to the All Blacks for tours to Australia in 1929 and against the British Lions in New Zealand in 1930. These were his last games for the All Blacks.

In 1935 Nēpia went to England to play rugby league professionally being signed initially by Streatham and Mitcham Rugby League Club in London for £500, at the time the highest fee paid to any New Zealand Rugby League player. His family remained in New Zealand. Because rugby union was a strictly amateur game at the time, Nēpia was cast out from rugby union. Nēpia later transferred to Halifax. In 1937 he returned to New Zealand and played league for the Hornby club in Christchurch and was then selected for the New Zealand Māori teach which beat Australia at Carlaw Park on 11 August, and then the New Zealand rugby league team which beat Australia again three days later on 14 August. During July and August 1937 Nēpia travelled to the South Island, representing both Hornby and Canterbury. In 1938 he moved to Auckland and joined the Manukau club and played two seasons for them.

== Later life ==
Following his retirement from playing rugby Nēpia became a referee and worked as a farm manager in the Wairoa district. In 1975 his wife Huinga died. Nēpia lived out his final years with his son Winston in Rangitukia. He died in Ruatoria on 27 August 1986.

== Tributes ==
Timed to coincide with the 2011 Rugby World Cup, New Zealand playwright Hone Kouka wrote a one-person show, I, George Nēpia about Nēpia who was his great uncle. Kouka said the play evoked "vivid memories of the rugby legend" and was an opportunity at the time to showcase the best both of rugby and New Zealand theatre. Kouka spoke to the family before writing the play, and while they supported the project and trusted him, he recalled: "Opening night was scary, though. All the Nepias were in the audience. Thankfully they loved it". The play won four Chapman Tripp Theatre Awards in 2011.
