= Manawhenua Rugby Union =

Manawhenua
Club information
- Full name: Manawhenua Rugby Union
- Colours: Red, white and blue
- Founded: 1925

Manawhenua was a New Zealand rugby union team which briefly existed as an amalgamation of the Manawatu and Horowhenua unions. The merger lasted from 1925 until 1933.

The team played wearing red with blue and white hoops.

== Ranfurly Shield ==
In Manawhenua's short existence it managed to take part in six Ranfurly Shield matches between 1927 and 1929. Manawhenua had three successful matches in 1927 when it took the Shield off Wairarapa and defended it twice before losing to Canterbury.

1927

6-8-27, Carterton, Manawhenua 18 vs Wairarapa 16
31-8-27, Palmerston North, Manawhenua 9 vs Taranaki 3
3-9-27, Palmerston North, Manawhenua 25 vs Wanganui 6
7-9-27, Palmerston North, Canterbury 17 vs Manawhenua 6

1928

15-9-28, Carterton, Wairarapa 31 vs Manawhenua 10

1929

17-8-29, Masterton, Wairarapa 37 vs Manawhenua 16
