= Bush Rugby Football Union =

Rugby team in New Zealand

Bush

Club information
- Full name: Bush Rugby Football Union
- Colours: Maroon and Blue
- Founded: 1890
- Exited: 1971

Former details
- Ground: Bush Park, Pahiatua

The Bush Rugby Football Union was a provincial rugby union team from New Zealand, existing between 1890 and 1971.

The union was formed on 19 April 1890 at Pahiatua by the Pahiatua, Woodville and Eketāhuna rugby football clubs. The original plan was to include Dannevirke and name the team "70 Mile Bush", but the Dannevirke club instead opted to remain part of Hawke's Bay.

In 1971 Bush amalgamated with the Wairarapa Rugby Football Union to form Wairarapa Bush Rugby Football Union. In 1950 the Wairarapa and Bush unions put up a combined team to play the touring British Lions, losing 13–27.

== Ranfurly Shield ==
Bush had seven unsuccessful challenges for the Ranfurly Shield between 1927 and 1968:

- 1927: Wairarapa 53 vs Bush 3, at Masterton
- 1928: Wairarapa 57 vs Bush 11, at Masterton
- 1939: Southland 38 vs Bush 0, at Invercargill
- 1957: Wellington 22 vs Bush 9, at Wellington
- 1962: Auckland 46 vs Bush 6, at Auckland
- 1965: Taranaki 33 vs Bush 6, at New Plymouth
- 1968: Hawke's Bay 36 vs Bush 6, at Napier

== All Blacks ==
Bush had only one All Black, Athol "Tonk" Mahoney, who represented New Zealand in 26 matches between 1929 and 1936. He played 36 matches for Bush between 1927 and 1939.
