= 1929 New Zealand rugby union tour of Australia =

Sports

Summary
P	W	D	L
Total
8	5	0	3
Test match
3	0	0	3
Opponent
P	W	D	L
Australia
3	0	0	3

The 1929 New Zealand rugby tour to New South Wales was the 14th tour by the New Zealand national rugby union team to Australia.

For the first time since the First World War, Australia could present a real and official national team, after the activity of Rugby Union was suspended during the war and reprised only in New South Wales (many players switched to Rugby league especially in Queensland).

Australia won the 3 match Test series 3–0.

== Preliminary matches ==
Scores and results list New Zealand's points tally first.

Opposing Team	For	Against	Date	Venue	Status
New Zealand Māori	37	18	29 June 1929	Wellington	Preliminary

== Tour matches ==
Scores and results list New Zealand's points tally first.

Opposing Team	For	Against	Date	Venue	Status
Australia	8	9	6 July 1929	Sports Ground, Sydney	Test match
New South Wales	22	9	10 July 1929	Sports Ground, Sydney	Tour match
An Australian XV	25	4	13 July 1929	Exhibition Ground, Melbourne	Tour match
New South Wales Country	27	8	17 July 1929	Showground, Armidale	Tour match
Australia	9	17	20 July 1929	Exhibition Ground, Brisbane	Test match
Queensland	27	0	24 July 1929	Exhibition Ground, Brisbane	Tour match
Australia	13	15	27 July 1929	Sydney Cricket Ground, Sydney	Test match
N.S.W. 2nd XV	20	12	31 July 1929	Sydney Cricket Ground, Sydney	Tour match
