= Wairarapa Rugby Football Union =

Wairarapa

Club information
- Full name: Wairarapa Rugby Football Union
- Founded: 1886

Current details
- Ground: Memorial Park

The Wairarapa Rugby Football Union was formed in 1886 and played until 1971, when they amalgamated with the Bush Rugby Football Union to form Wairarapa Bush Rugby Football Union.

== All Blacks ==
Wairarapa had 15 All Blacks between 1903 and 1971.

== Ranfurly Shield ==
Wairarapa held the Ranfurly Shield, briefly in 1927, and again between 1928 and 1929. They held it again for one match in 1950 before losing it to South Canterbury.
