= USS Wissahickon (SP-852) =

Patrol vessel of the United States Navy

History

United States
- Name: USS Wissahickon and USS SP-852
- Namesake: Wissahickon was her previous name retained; SP-852 was her section patrol number
- Builder: George Lawley & Son, Neponset, Massachusetts
- Laid down: 1899
- Completed: 1900
- Acquired: Possibly April 1917 or 13 July 1917
- Commissioned: Possibly 20 August or 3 October 1917
- Decommissioned: 12 February 1919
- Renamed: USS SP-852 either upon commissioning or in 1918; Wissahickon ca. September–November 1918
- Stricken: 10 February 1919
- Fate: Ordered returned to owner 15 February 1919
- Notes: Operated as private yacht Valda 1900-1901/1902 and Wissahickon 1901/1902-1917 and from 1919

General characteristics
- Type: Patrol vessel
- Tonnage: 74 Gross register tons
- Displacement: 194 tons
- Length: 120 ft (37 m)
- Beam: 14 ft 2 in (4.32 m)
- Draft: 6 ft (1.8 m)
- Depth: 8 ft 9 in (2.67 m)
- Propulsion: Steam engine, one shaft
- Speed: 12 knots
- Complement: 19
- Armament: 1 × 3-pounder gun; 2 × machine guns

The second USS Wissahickon (SP-852), which also served as USS SP-852, was a United States Navy patrol vessel in commission from 1917 to 1918.

== Construction and early civilian career ==
Wissahickon was laid down in 1899 by George Lawley & Son at Neponset, Massachusetts, as the private single-screw steam yacht Valda, with a composite hull made of an iron frame with wood planking. Valda was completed in 1900 and renamed Wissahickon in late 1901 or early 1902. She was the property of Mrs. Charles W. Henry of Philadelphia, Pennsylvania, when the United States entered World War I on 6 April 1917 and may have served in the Maine Naval Militia prior to her acquisition by the U.S. Navy.

== Acquisition and commissioning ==
In 1917, the U.S. Navy acquired Wissahickon from Mrs. Henry for use as a section patrol vessel during World War I. Records concerning Wissahickon's acquisition and commissioning are vague, somewhat contradictory, and incomplete. It appears that U.S. Navy personnel reported aboard Wissahickon as early as April 1917, although one record source states that the Navy did not acquire her from Mrs. Henry until 13 July 1917. No primary source states her commissioning date; her ship's log starts on 20 August 1917 - but one secondary source states that she was not commissioned until 3 October 1917.

At any rate, Wissahickon was commissioned sometime between April and early October 1917. Sources differ as to whether she was commissioned without her name as USS SP-852 or as USS Wissahickon (SP-852), with her name being changed in 1918 to USS SP-852.

== U.S. Navy service ==
The Navy considered Wissahickon/SP-852 too light for "distant service" in European waters, so she was placed in the Naval Coast Defense Reserve and assigned to the 1st Naval District in northern New England. Initially based at Rockland, Maine, she began patrols in the vicinity of that port. She spent most of the winter of 1917-1918 moored to a pier there; in January 1918, all of her officers and enlisted men became ill with common colds and sore throats, and the ship was quarantined until the diseases ran their course. When her crew had returned to good health, she returned to patrol duty off Rockland.

In mid-summer 1918, she was reassigned to duty at Boston, Massachusetts, where she arrived on 20 August 1918. She operated from the section base at East Boston, Massachusetts, for the rest of World War I and into January 1919. Apparently sometime between September and November 1918, and definitely by 1 January 1919, her name was changed from USS SP-852 to USS Wissahickon (SP-852).

== Disposal ==
Late in January 1919, Wissahickon moved to Camden, Maine. She was stricken from the Navy List on 10 February 1919 and was decommissioned at Camden on 12 February 1919. On 15 February 1919, she was ordered returned to Mrs. Henry.
