= USS Hiawatha =

USS Hiawatha has been the name of more than one United States Navy ship, and may refer to:

- USS Hiawatha (SP-183), a patrol vessel in commission from 1917 to 1920
- USS Hiawatha (ID-2892), a tug in commission in 1918
- USS Hiawatha (YT-265), later YTB-265 and YTM-265, a tug placed in service in 1942 and sold for scrapping in 1987
