= MV Star of Malta =

Yacht, later a patrol yacht and a passenger ferry

History
- Name: Camargo (1928–38); Ramfis (1938–42)
- Namesake: Marie-Anne de Cupis de Camargo
- Owner: Julius Fleischmann, Jr. (1928–38); Rafael Trujillo (1938–42)
- Builder: George Lawley & Son, Neponset, Boston, Massachusetts
- Cost: $625,000
- Completed: 1928
- Fate: Sold to the US Navy, 2 February 1942

History

United States
- Name: Marcasite (PY-28)
- Namesake: Marcasite
- Acquired: 2 February 1942
- Commissioned: 12 May 1942
- Decommissioned: 5 October 1944
- Stricken: 14 October 1944
- Identification: Call sign: NAGY
- Fate: Sold, 5 December 1944

History
- Name: Commando (1944–47); Westminster (1947–52); Star of Malta (1952–66)
- Owner: Minster SS Co. Ltd (Mitchell Cotts & Co. Malta) (1947–52); Paul M. Laferla (1952–66); Cantieri Navali delle Grazie (1966)
- Fate: Scrapped, 1966

General characteristics
- Type: Yacht, later a patrol yacht and a passenger ferry
- Tonnage: 968 GRT
- Displacement: 1,130 long tons (1,150 t)
- Length: 225 ft 2 in (68.63 m)
- Beam: 32 ft 4 in (9.86 m)
- Draft: 17 ft (5.2 m)
- Propulsion: 2 x 800hp diesel engines
- Speed: 12 kn (22 km/h; 14 mph)
- Complement: 30–45 crew and 80 passengers (private yacht); 120 men (patrol yacht)
- Armament: As USS Marcasite: 2 × 3"/50 dual-purpose gun mounts; 2 × depth charge tracks; 1 × Y-gun depth charge projector

MV Star of Malta was a passenger ferry which operated routes from Malta to Sicily in the 1950s and 1960s, notable for its sinking off Malta on 29 July 1955, resulting in the death of one crew member and one passenger. Prior to that, she had a long career under a number of different names.

The vessel was built in 1928 as the luxury yacht Camargo for Julius Fleischmann Jr. She made a world cruise in 1930–31, during which its crew spied on Japanese-held territories on behalf of the American government. In 1938, she was sold to the Dominican Republic dictator Rafael Trujillo, being renamed Ramfis.

From 1942 to 1944, the vessel served in the United States Navy as the patrol yacht USS Marcasite (PY-28). She was subsequently sold into commercial service, being renamed Commando in 1944 and Westminster in 1947. In 1952, the vessel was acquired by Paul M. Laferla, and she was renamed Star of Malta and converted into a passenger ferry, operating routes from Malta to Sicily. After the 1955 sinking, she was raised and returned into service. She was scrapped in Italy in 1966.

== Description ==
The vessel had a tonnage of 968 gross register tons and a displacement of 1,130 long tons (1,150 t). She was 225 ft 2 in (68.63 m) long, and she had a beam of 32 ft 4 in (9.86 m) and a draft of 17 ft (5.2 m). She had a 60,000 US gallons (230,000 L; 50,000 imp gal) fuel tank and two 800 hp diesel engines, and she had a speed of 12 knots (22 km/h; 14 mph).

As a private yacht, the vessel could accommodate around 30 to 45 crew and up to 80 passengers. As USS Marcasite, she had a complement of 120 men and she was armed with two 3"/50 dual-purpose gun mounts, two depth charge tracks and a Y-gun depth charge projector.

== Private yacht ==
The vessel was originally built as the private luxury yacht Camargo for Julius Fleischmann Jr., son of the American businessman Julius Fleischmann. Named after Marie-Anne de Cupis de Camargo, she was the first of five yachts of that name to be owned by Fleischmann. She was built by George Lawley & Son of Neponset, Boston in 1928 (although some sources state that she was launched in 1925). The vessel cost $625,000, making it one of the most expensive private yachts of its time, and it was criticized in the press for its extravagance.

Between 1931 and 1932, Julius Fleischmann, his wife Dorette and their two children went on a world cruise on the Camargo along with three friends, a personal physician, National Geographic photographer Amos Burg and a crew of 36. Their 36,000-mile (58,000 km)-long journey began at the New York Yacht Club, and they visited Bermuda and Jamaica before passing through the Panama Canal and reaching the Pacific. There, they visited many islands including the Galápagos Islands and the Dutch East Indies. They eventually passed through the Red Sea and into the Mediterranean Sea.

During the cruise, the Fleischmanns collected many artifacts such as shields, masks and tools. The journey was well-documented in photographs, and a three-hour long film was also produced and it is now preserved at the Smithsonian Institution Archives. While in the South Pacific, Fleischmann and the crew made maps and recorded information which was later used by the Americans to attack Japanese-held islands in World War II. During the journey, the Fleischmanns also came across three castaways who had been shipwrecked on Cocos Island, and they called the United States Navy who managed to rescue them.

In 1938, the Camargo was sold to Rafael Trujillo, the dictator of the Dominican Republic, and she was renamed Ramfis.

== US Navy patrol yacht ==
The United States Navy purchased Ramfis from Trujillo on 2 February 1942. The vessel was renamed Marcasite on 10 February, and she was converted into a patrol yacht by the Tampa Shipbuilding Company of Tampa, Florida. She was commissioned at Tampa on 12 May 1942.

On 22 May, the vessel left Tampa for its journey to the Pacific. After stopping at Key West, she escorted convoys on the way to the Panama Canal. On 9 June, while still in the Caribbean, there were suspicions that she encountered an enemy submarine and she fired depth charges at it. She departed Balboa on 20 June, reaching San Diego ten days later.

She sailed for Pearl Harbor in Hawaii in late July, arriving there in August. In Hawaii, her duties included escorting merchant ships and patrolling the approaches to the harbor. She occasionally escorted supply ships to and from Midway Atoll.

Marcasite was transferred to the northwestern sea frontier on 26 June 1943. She departed Pearl Harbor on 13 July and arrived in Seattle on 9 August. She was subsequently a patrol and weather station ship, carrying out three-week-long patrols throughout 1943 and 1944.

On 16 June 1944, Marcasite arrived at Puget Sound Naval Shipyard, and twelve days later she was placed in reduced commission. The vessel was decommissioned on 5 October and she was transferred to the War Shipping Administration for disposal. Her name was struck from the Navy List nine days later.

== Commercial service ==
The Navy sold the vessel for commercial use on 5 December 1944, and she was renamed Commando. The vessel was renamed once again in 1947 to Westminster, after being acquired by the Minster SS Co. Ltd (Mitchell Cotts & Co. Malta).

In 1952, she was sold again, this time to Paul M. Laferla, who renamed her Star of Malta and converted her into a passenger ferry. She operated routes between Malta and Syracuse on Sicily three times a week, carrying passengers and mail.

In April 1953, while en route from Malta to Syracuse in rough seas, the vessel began taking on water after some engine trouble. Passengers were assembled at the top deck and SOS distress signals were sent to nearby ships, but the crew managed to bail out water and the ship was moved to the more sheltered Capo Passero. The crew were then able to solve the problems and they managed to arrive in Syracuse within a few hours.

=== 1955 sinking ===
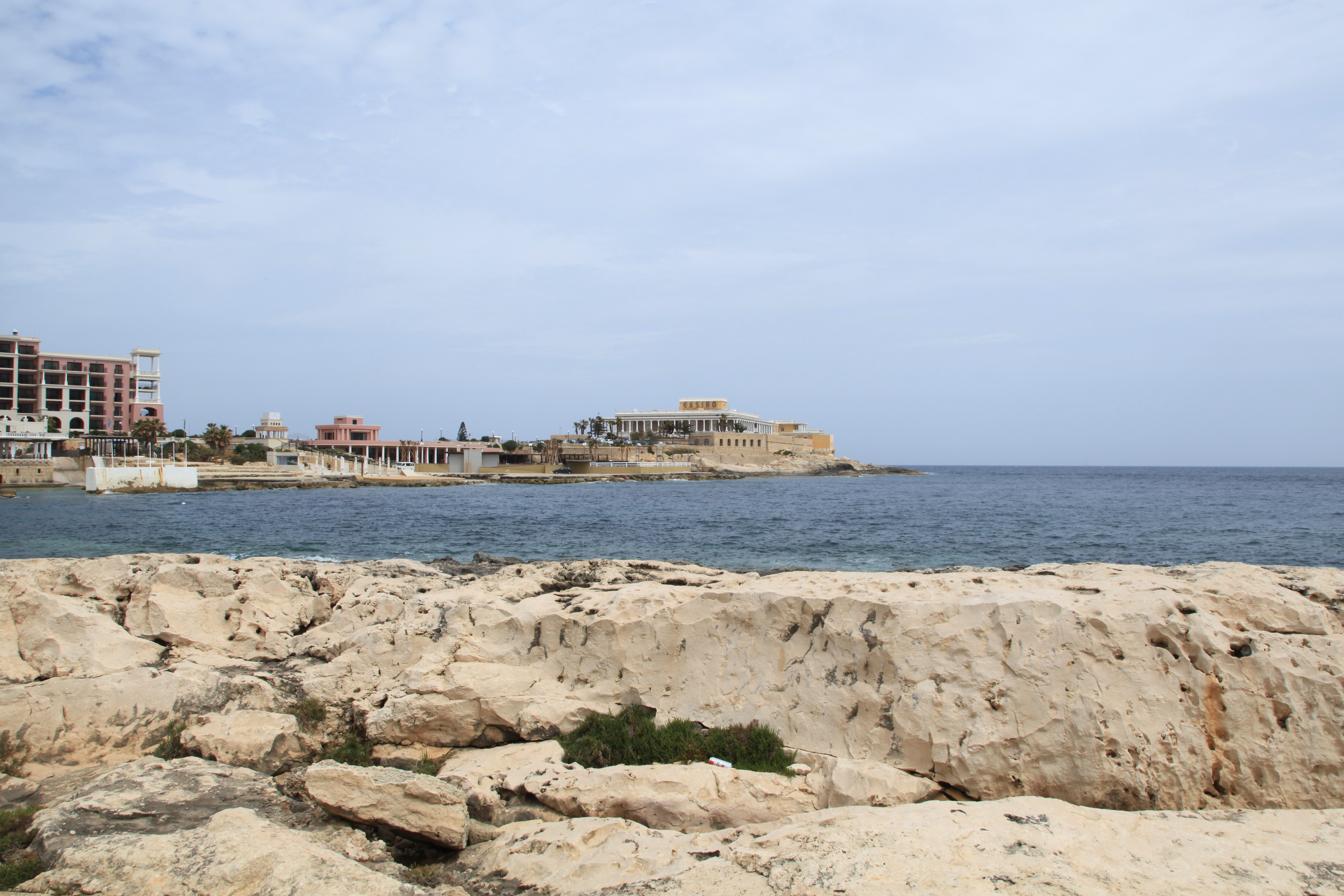
The vessel ran aground off the Merkanti Reef, close to Dragonara Point in St. Julian's, Malta

On the morning of 29 July 1955, Star of Malta was returning to Malta from Syracuse. At the time, there was a lot of mist, and due to a navigational error, the vessel ran aground on the Merkanti Reef about 80 m (260 ft) off the coast of St. Julian's and capsized.

At the time of its sinking, the vessel was carrying 57 passengers. The majority of the passengers and crew survived the sinking, either managing to swim to the shore or being rescued by small boats which came to help. There were two casualties: one crew member drowned in the sinking and a passenger was missing.

Divers from the Royal Navy's Special Boat Section searched the partially-submerged ship shortly after the grounding. Prime Minister Dom Mintoff boarded the vessel on the day of the grounding while rescue operations were ongoing.

After the passengers had disembarked the vessel, some of the cargo including fruit and livestock as well as some valuables was stolen. The ship's log book might have also been taken at this point. The mail carried on the vessel was retrieved, and postal authorities applied a handstamp reading "Damaged by seawater / ex "Star of Malta" 29.7.55" to the salvaged mail.

Since the Star of Malta was the only sea link between Malta and Sicily, after its sinking the destroyer HMS Scorpion (D64) was sent to Sicily to pick up stranded passengers. The vessel was refloated in August 1955, and she was repaired at the Rodriquez shipyard in Messina, Sicily.

An inquiry held after the grounding found that Commodore Kent was responsible for the vessel's grounding, and the assessors recommended suspending his master's ticket for a year from the date of the accident.

=== Final years ===
The vessel returned to Malta after two months, and she was returned into service. On her journey to Malta, she was captained by the Yugoslav captain Velkjo Hajjia.

In March 1966, the vessel was sold to Cantieri Navali delle Grazie of La Spezia, and she was scrapped.
