= USS Wanderlust =

Patrol vessel of the United States Navy

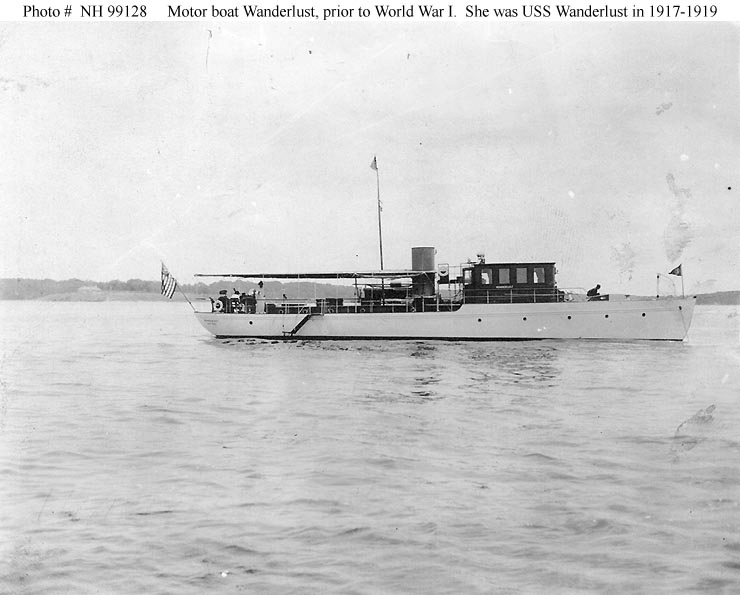
- USS Wanderlust (SP-923)Launch Wanderlust in 1913-1917, prior to her U.S. Navy service

History

United States
- Name: USS Wanderlust
- Namesake: Wanderlust (previous name retained)
- Builder: George Lawley & Son, Neponset, Massachusetts
- Completed: 1907
- Acquired: 26 August 1917
- Commissioned: 12 September 1917
- Stricken: 2 February 1919
- Fate: Returned to owner 1919; Retired ca. 1929-1931
- Notes: Operated as private motorboat Faalua 1907-1913, Wanderlust 1913-1917 and 1919-1927, and Diana 1927-ca. 1929-1931

General characteristics
- Type: Patrol vessel
- Displacement: 48 tons
- Length: 83 ft 0 in (25.30 m)
- Beam: 13 ft 1 in (3.99 m)
- Draft: 3 ft 8.5 in (1.130 m) aft
- Speed: 12 knots
- Complement: 13
- Armament: 2 × 1-pounder guns; 1 × machine gun

USS Wanderlust (SP-923) was a patrol vessel that served in the United States Navy from 1917 to 1919.

Wanderlust began life as the wooden-hulled screw launch Faalua, designed by F. D. Lawley and built by George Lawley & Son of Neponset, Massachusetts, for George G. Peters of Boston, Massachusetts. Completed in 1907, Faalua was subsequently owned in turn by Sherburn M. Becker and E. J. Steiner, both of New York City. Apparently Steiner purchased her in 1913 and renamed her Wanderlust.

Wanderlust was delivered to the U.S. Navy on 26 August 1917 for World War I service. Armed and designated SP-923, she was commissioned at the Charleston Navy Yard at Charleston, South Carolina, on 12 September 1917.

Wanderlust operated on section patrol duties in the 6th Naval District well into 1918, although she appears to have spent much time, initially, undergoing repairs for her temperamental engines. Her ports of call included Parris Island, Port Royal, South Carolina, and Charleston, South Carolina, Savannah, Georgia, and Jacksonville, Florida. When on patrol duty, Wanderlust stopped and boarded fishing vessels, ascertaining whether or not they carried proper navigational equipment and licenses that were in order. Wanderlust conducted night harbor patrols at Brunswick, Georgia, from April 1918 into the late autumn of 1918.

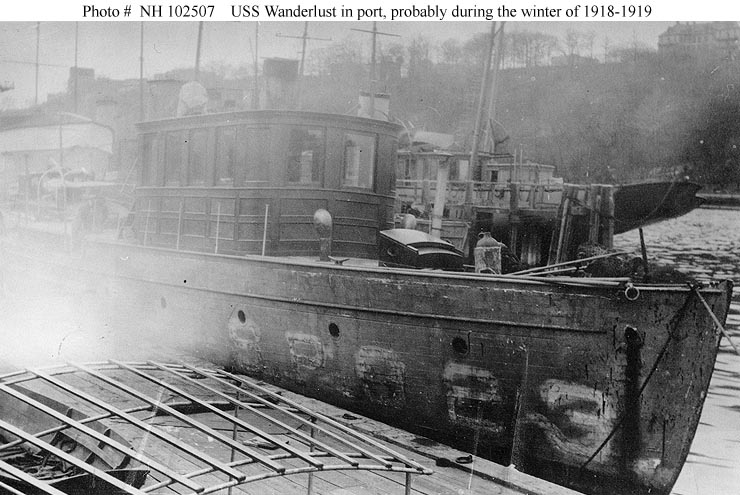
USS Wanderlust, probably while awaiting return to her owner in early 1919.

Wanderlust's deck logs cease on 30 September 1918 when she was at Brunswick. The 1918 edition of Ship's Data: U.S. Naval Vessels lists her as serving on section patrol duties as of 1 November 1918. In the absence of solid data, it must be assumed that, like many other district patrol craft, if she was in active service in mid-to-late November 1918, she would have ceased defensive patrolling on 24 November 1918, 13 days after the armistice ended World War I. She may have lain in reserve or performed dispatch services between 30 September 1918, when her deck logs end, and 2 February 1919, the date upon which she was struck from the Navy List.

Returning to private ownership, Wanderlust retained her name into the 1920s under a succession of owners, including Irving E. Raymond of Stamford, Connecticut, and Mrs. Marguerite Park of New York City, before she was acquired in 1927 by William Sternfeld of New York City, who renamed her Diana. She disappeared from the Lloyd's List of American Yachts between 1929 and 1931, presumably leaving service sometime during that period.
