= Cigarette (disambiguation) =

A cigarette is a small roll of finely cut tobacco leaves wrapped in a cylinder of thin paper for smoking.

Cigarette may also refer to:

- "Cigarette", a character of a vivandière in the 1867 novel Under Two Flags
- Cigarette (1/3), a public sculpture located on the Albright Knox Art Gallery grounds
- USS Cigarette (SP-1234), a United States Navy patrol vessel in commission from 1917 to 1919
- "Cigarette", a song by Ali Barter on the 2017 album A Suitable Girl
- "Cigarette", a song by Ben Folds Five on the 1997 album Whatever and Ever Amen
- "Cigarette", a song by Frankie Ballard on the 2016 album El Río
- "Cigarette", a song by The Smithereens on the 1986 album Especially for You

== Other uses ==
- Cigarette boat, an alternative name for a go-fast boat

== See also ==
- Cigarettes (disambiguation)
