= Goelet Cup =

Sailing race competition

- Sport: Sailing competition
- Founded: 1882 (144 years ago)

The Goelet Cup was a prestigious sailing competition with a trophy of the same name created in 1882 by Ogden Goelet.

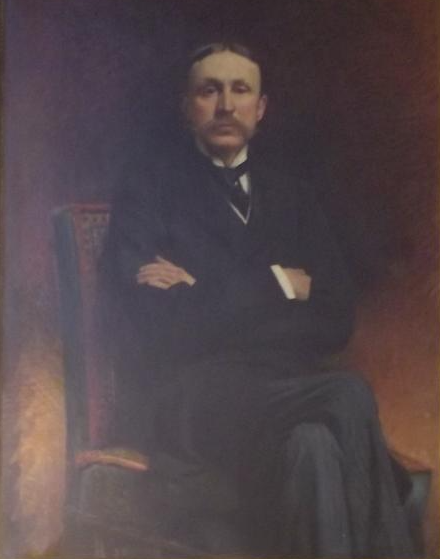
Ogden Goelet, founder and funder of the Goelet Cup

== Origin ==
The cup was originally conceived of and funded by yachtsman and real estate magnate Ogden Goelet. A silver trophy prize valued at $1000 was offered to winning schooners and a $500 silver trophy awarded to winning sloops in an annual race at Newport where Goelet had a home. The first trophies for the 1882 races were made by Whiting Manufacturing Co.. Some of the sought-after cups which were given to winners to take home were later made by Tiffany & Co.. Elaborate details like waves, mermaids and chrysanthemums decorated the coveted trophies which took the shape of pitchers and punch bowls.

The parties in Newport associated with the races drew almost as much attention as the competition itself. Winners of the cup included famous yachts like the Puritan, the Mayflower, Columbia, Volunteer, and the Vigilant.

In 1897, only one cup was awarded for the sloop race between Vigilant and Navahoe. The handling of the winning boat, Navahoe, by Skipper Aubrey Crocker, was described as "masterly." No cup was awarded in the schooner race since there was only one participant who sailed unopposed.

After Goelet's death in 1897, his family declined to fund the cups going forward and no monies had been left in his will to continue the awards. New cups were offered to the New York Yacht Club and funded by John Jacob Astor IV. Astor proposed to offer the cups in perpetuity by including funding for them in his will. They were called the Astor Cups and the races proceeded in the same place and at the same time of the year as the Goelet Cups before them.

== Legacy ==
The 31 silver trophies, many but not all by Tiffany, still command attention. Some of the Goelet cups have been exhibited with other notable sporting awards as testament to their appeal and exceptional craftsmanship. Some can be found in museum collections as the artistry behind these pieces represent an important era in the development of decorative arts in America. One of the cups from the 1893 Goelet Cup races that was awarded to the schooner Lasca can be found in the collection of the Yale University Art Gallery.
