= USS Sapphire (PYc-2) =

Patrol vessel of the United States Navy

History

United States
- Name: Margo (1929–1932); Buccaneer (1933–1940)
- Owner: B.A. Massee (1929–1932); Leon Mandel (1933–1940)
- Ordered: 1929
- Builder: George Lawley & Son, Neponset, Massachusetts
- Launched: 1929
- Home port: Chicago, Illinois (1929–1932); Wilmington, Delaware (1933–1940)
- Identification: Official number: 228861; Signal letters: MHLK (Margo); Signal letters: WKDI (Buccaneer)
- Fate: Acquired by the Navy, 1 November 1940

United States
- Name: Sapphire
- Namesake: Sapphire
- Acquired: 1 November 1940
- Commissioned: 6 June 1941
- Decommissioned: 29 October 1945
- Stricken: 13 November 1945
- Identification: Hull symbol: PYc-2; Code letters: NAST
- Fate: Transferred to the Maritime Commission for sale, 3 September 1946. Foundered, 1957

General characteristics
- Type: Yacht Patrol boat
- Displacement: 500 long tons (508 t)
- Length: 165 ft 4 in (50.39 m)
- Beam: 25 ft 2 in (7.67 m)
- Draft: 12 ft (3.7 m)
- Installed power: 2 × Cooper Bessemer diesel engine; 1,700 shp (1,300 kW)
- Propulsion: 2 × screws
- Speed: 13.5 kn (15.5 mph; 25.0 km/h)
- Complement: 21 (private yacht); 59 (Navy service)
- Armament: 2 × 3 in (76 mm)/50 caliber gun; 1 × Y-gun depth charge projector; 2 × Depth charge tracks

The second USS Sapphire (PYc-2) was a patrol boat in the United States Navy.

== Construction ==
Originally a private yacht and later a navy training vessel, Sapphire was built in 1929, and named Margo by George Lawley & Son, Neponset, Massachusetts. It was acquired by the US Navy from a later owner, Mr. Leon Mandel, Quonset, Rhode Island, on 1 November 1940. The navy renamed the boat Sapphire, designated it PYc—2, and converted it for Navy use. It was officially commissioned at Boston, on 6 June 1941.

== Service history ==
=== World War II, 1941–1945 ===
In August 1941, Sapphire was sent to Norfolk, Virginia, to outfit her for sea duty. In September 1941, Sapphire left Norfolk with orders to patrol and perform anti-mine operations in the area of the Panama Canal. While on her southbound voyage she was abruptly ordered to reverse course and proceeded north to her home port, New London, Connecticut. There, throughout World War II, the ship supported various Submarine School programs, but was primarily engaged in training prospective commanding officers in attack procedures and in testing sound equipment. Sapphire also engaged in anti-submarine patrols and some fought actions with German U-boats. As Storekeeper First Class Ed Hickey, a crewmen on Sapphire, commented, "We knew we were a sitting duck for any U-boat that we found since a converted yacht is no match even though we had some depth charges and a few other armaments."

On 8 April 1942, an aircraft identified by the crew of the submarine USS Mackerel (SS-204) as a United States Army Air Forces P-38 Lightning fighter mistook Mackerel for a German U-boat and dropped four bombs which straddled Mackerel′s track while Mackerel was conducting exercises with Sapphire 3 nautical miles (5.6 km; 3.5 mi) south of the Watch Hill buoy off Watch Hill, Rhode Island. The bombs ricocheted 100 feet (30 m) off the water and did not explode. Neither Mackerel or Sapphire, which was 1,000 yards (910 m) off Mackerel′s starboard quarter at the time, suffered damage or casualties.

On 21 May 1942 a German U-boat attacked the American 3,282-gross register ton cargo ship Plow City in the Atlantic Ocean about 30 nautical miles (56 km; 35 mi) off Bermuda, sinking her with two torpedoes. One crewman was killed and the remainder of the crew abandoned ship in Plow City′s lifeboats. Sapphire was ordered to search for and rescue the surviving crew, and on 26 May 1942 she located 30 survivors in lifeboats.

On 13 March 1943, Sapphire was conducting torpedo exercises with the U.S. Navy submarine USS R-6 (SS-83) off the coast of Rhode Island when four U.S. Navy TBF-1 Avenger torpedo bombers mistook R-6 for a German U-boat and dropped depth charges on R-6 in Block Island Sound 7 nautical miles (13 km; 8.1 mi) off the southwest corner of Block Island. R-6 suffered no damage or casualties.

=== Decommissioning and disposal ===
With the end of World War II in August 1945, Sapphire was designated for inactivation. On 19 September 1945, she departed New London and proceeded to Charleston, South Carolina, where she was decommissioned on 29 October 1945. Struck from the Navy List on 13 November 1945, she was transferred to the United States Maritime Commission for disposal through sale on 3 September 1946.
