= USS Humming Bird (AMc-26) =

Minesweeper of the United States Navy

History

United States
- Ordered: as Whaling City
- Laid down: 1936
- Launched: 1936
- Acquired: 30 October 1940
- In service: 12 June 1941
- Out of service: 18 February 1945
- Stricken: c. 1945
- Fate: Sold, fate unknown

General characteristics
- Displacement: 180 tons
- Length: 90 ft 5 in (27.56 m)
- Beam: 19 ft 10 in (6.05 m)
- Draught: 9 ft (2.7 m)
- Speed: 9 k

USS Humming Bird (AMc-26) was a unique coastal minesweeper acquired by the U.S. Navy for the dangerous task of removing mines from minefields laid in the water to prevent ships from passing.

The first ship to be named Humming Bird by the Navy was a wooden dragger, built as Whaling City in 1936 by Morse Shipyard, Thomaston, Maine; acquired by purchase 30 October 1940 from her owner, William Hayes of New Bedford, Massachusetts; converted to Navy use at Geo. Lawley & Son, Neponset, Massachusetts, and placed in service 12 June 1941.

Humming Bird operated throughout the war as a minesweeper and minesweeping training vessel, largely in the vicinity of Mine Warfare Training School, Yorktown, Virginia.

She was reclassified Small Boat C-13548, 12 June 1944 and placed out of service at New York 18 February 1945. Delivered to the Maritime Commission, the craft was eventually sold.
