= USS Orca (SP-726) =

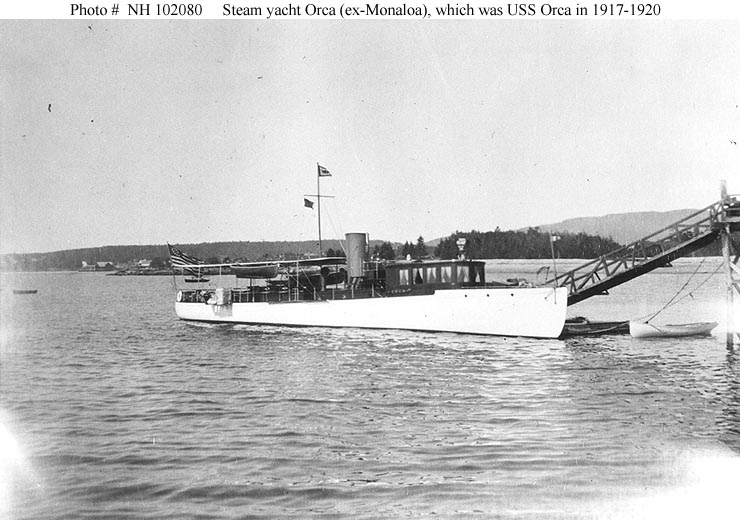
- Private yacht Orca prior to her 1917-1918 U.S. Navy service as USS Orca (SP-726).

History

United States
- Name: USS Orca
- Namesake: The orca or killer whale (previous name retained)
- Builder: George Lawley & Son, Neponset, Massachusetts
- Completed: 1901
- Acquired: 17 May 1917
- Commissioned: 8 May 1917
- Decommissioned: 30 December 1918
- Stricken: 18 August 1919
- Fate: Sold 2 February 1920
- Notes: Operated as private yacht Monaloa and Orca 1901-1917

General characteristics
- Type: Patrol vessel
- Displacement: 37 tons
- Length: 85 ft 0 in (25.91 m)
- Beam: 11 ft 8 in (3.56 m)
- Draft: 4 ft 3 in (1.30 m)
- Speed: 12.5 knots
- Complement: 15
- Armament: 1 × 1-pounder gun; 1 × machine gun

The first USS Orca (SP-726) was a yacht that served in the United States Navy as a patrol vessel from 1917 to 1918.

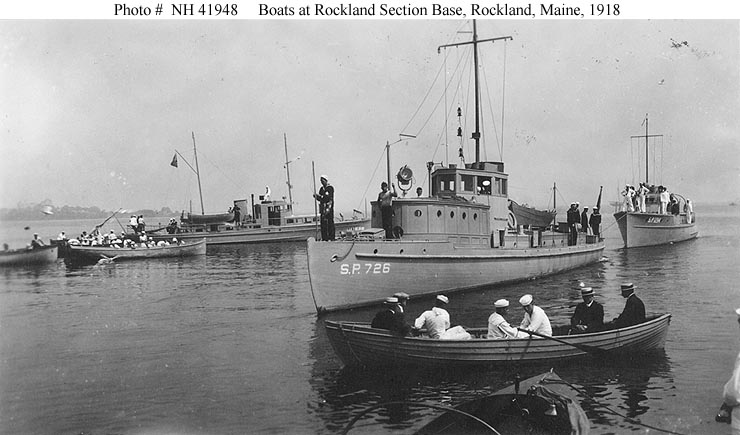
USS Orca (SP-726) exercising at Rockland Section Base, Rockland, Maine, in 1918 with patrol vessels USS Content (SP-538) (left center background) and USS Kangaroo (SP-1284) (astern of Orca) and various small boats.

Orca was built as the steam yacht Monaloa by George Lawley & Son, Neponset, Massachusetts. Later renamed Orca, she was commissioned into the U.S. Navy for World War I service on 8 May 1917 with Boatswain F. D. Grassie in command and was formally purchased by the United States Government from S. W. Colten of Bryn Mawr, Pennsylvania, on 17 May 1917.

Operating in the 1st Naval District, headquartered at Boston, Massachusetts, during World War I, Orca patrolled in and around Boston throughout her naval career.

She was moored to Fishe Wharf, Boston, from October to December 1918. In December, she steamed to Quincy, Massachusetts, where she decommissioned on 30 December 1918.

Orca was struck from the Naval Register and ordered sold on 18 August 1919. She was sold to Frazer Brace and Company of New York City on 2 February 1920.
