= Charles Jackson Paine =

American railroad executive, soldier, and yachtsman

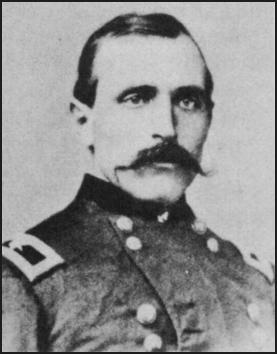
- General Charles J. Paine
- Born: August 26, 1833; Boston, Massachusetts
- Died: August 12, 1916 (aged 82); Weston, Massachusetts
- Burial place: Mount Auburn Cemetery
- Military career
- Allegiance: United States of America; Union
- Branch: United States Army; Union Army
- Service years: 1861–1866
- Rank: Brigadier General
- Conflicts: American Civil War: *Siege of Port Hudson; *Siege of Petersburg
- Other work: Railroad executive, yachtsman

Charles Jackson Paine (August 26, 1833 – August 12, 1916) was an American railroad executive, soldier, and yachtsman who was a general in the Union Army during the American Civil War.

== Biography ==
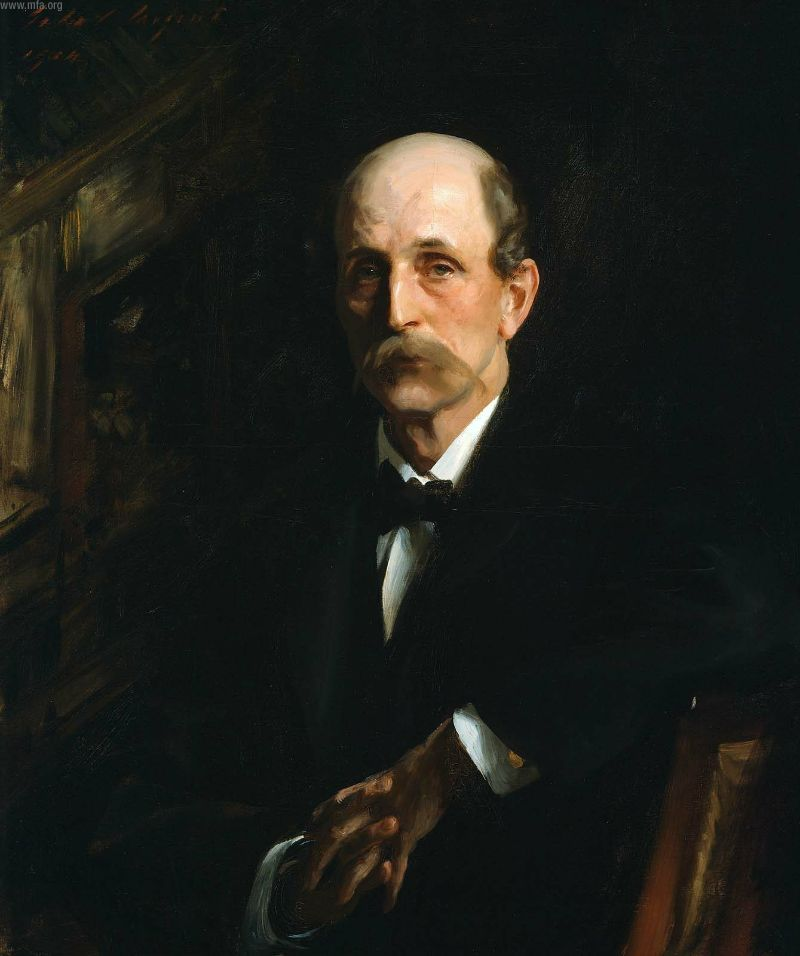
General Charles J. Paine, John Singer Sargent, 1904

Paine was born August 26, 1833, in Boston, Massachusetts, son of Charles Cushing Paine and Fannie Cabot Jackson, and great-grandson of Robert Treat Paine, one of the signers of the United States Declaration of Independence. His brother, Sumner Edward Jackson Paine, was a 2nd Lieutenant in Company A, 20th Regiment Massachusetts Volunteer Infantry and was killed during the repulse of Pickett's Charge on July 3, 1863, at the Battle of Gettysburg.

He graduated from Harvard in 1853 and made a considerable fortune in railroad enterprises. In 1861 he entered the Federal service as a captain in the 22nd Massachusetts Infantry. The next year he was sent to Ship Island, Mississippi. In October, he was commissioned as the first colonel of the 2nd Louisiana Infantry. During the siege of Port Hudson (May 24 – July 8, 1863) he commanded a brigade. On March 4, 1864, Paine resigned his commission and returned to Massachusetts.

The following July, he again entered the service as a brigadier general. On September 29, Paine led a division of black troops at New Market Heights, located south of Richmond, Virginia. Paine participated in both expeditions against Fort Fisher (December 1864/January 1865), although his troops played only a minor role. His division was however more actively engaged during the following Battle of Wilmington. After the war, he served briefly as the district commander at New Berne, and managed to arrange the retrieval of Robert Gould Shaw's captured sword, so that it could be returned to the bereaved family. On January 15, 1866, he was brevetted as a major general of volunteers.

During his later years, Paine took a great interest in yachting. He was the owner of the Puritan, the Mayflower, and the Volunteer, each of which successfully defended the America's Cup against a British challenger.

Paine was one of the oarsmen in the first boat race between Harvard and Yale (August 1852), which was the first inter-collegiate sporting event in North America. He would be one of the charter members of The Country Club (Brookline, Massachusetts), the prototype of country clubs everywhere, and built one of the first golf courses in North America in Weston, Massachusetts. He reputedly played with red golf balls, so as to be able to find them in the winter among the snowdrifts. Paine helped finance the founding of Middlesex School (Concord, Massachusetts), of which his son-in-law Frederick Winsor was the founder and first headmaster. Paine's interest in sports continued into the next generation: two of his sons, John B. and Sumner, won pistol-shooting events at the first modern Olympic Games (Athens 1896).

Paine died at his summer home in Weston, Massachusetts on August 12, 1916. He was buried at Mount Auburn Cemetery.

== See also ==
- List of American Civil War generals (Union)
- List of Massachusetts generals in the American Civil War
- Massachusetts in the American Civil War
