= USS Scoter =

USS Scoter has been the name of more than one United States Navy ship, and may refer to:

- USS Scoter (SP-20), originally also designated SP-53, a patrol boat in commission from 1917 until 1918 or 1919
- USS Scoter (AM-381), later MSF-381, a minesweeper in commission from 1945 to 1947

== See also ==
- USFS Scoter, a United States Bureau of Fisheries fishery patrol vessel in service from 1922 to 1940 which then served in the Fish and Wildlife Service fleet as US FWS Scoter from 1940 to 1949
