= USS Blue Jay (AMc-23) =

Minesweeper of the United States Navy

History

United States
- Ordered: as Charles J. Ashley
- Laid down: 1936
- Launched: 1936
- Acquired: 5 November 1940
- In service: 22 June 1941
- Out of service: 15 April 1946
- Stricken: 8 May 1946
- Fate: Returned to owner, 20 December 1946

General characteristics
- Displacement: 185 tons
- Length: 93 ft 4 in (28.45 m)
- Beam: 19 ft 4 in (5.89 m)
- Draught: 9 ft 6 in (2.90 m)
- Speed: 9.5 knots (17.6 km/h)
- Complement: 16
- Armament: two .30 cal (7.62 mm) machine guns

USS Blue Jay (AMc-23) was a coastal minesweeper acquired by the U.S. Navy during World War II for the dangerous task of removing mines from minefields laid in the water to prevent ships from passing.

Charles J. Ashley—a wooden-hulled "dragger" (fishing craft) built in 1936 at Thomaston, Maine, by the Wilbur Morse Shipyards—was acquired by the Navy from John G. Murley of Fairhaven, Massachusetts, on 5 November 1940; renamed Blue Jay and classified as a coastal minesweeper, AMc-23, on 22 November 1940; converted to a minecraft at the Neponset, Massachusetts, shipyards of George Lawley & Sons; and placed in service at the Boston Navy Yard on 22 June 1941.

== World War II service ==
Departing Boston, Massachusetts, on 14 July, Blue Jay arrived at the Mine Warfare School, Yorktown, Virginia, on the 18th for three weeks training. Departing Yorktown on 2 August, the minesweeper reached the Philadelphia Navy Yard the following day. Following upkeep, she and three other coastal minesweepers proceeded to the naval base at Cape May, New Jersey, on 16 August to operate as the minesweeping detachment of the 4th Naval District's local defense forces. Blue Jay, her three near-sisters, and two coastal minesweepers, swept the mouth of the Delaware River into the autumn of 1943.

== Converted to diving tender ==
Ordered to Newport, Rhode Island, for conversion to a diving tender (YDT), Blue Jay arrived there on 6 November 1943. With her reclassification, her name and coastal minesweeper designator were cancelled on 20 November 1943; and she became simply YDT-6. Converted for her new work at the Boston Navy Yard—the alterations completed by 22 May 1944—she proceeded to Quonset Point, Rhode Island, the same day and operated out of the naval air station there as a torpedo retriever and diving tender.

== Placed out of service ==
Placed out of service on 15 April 1946, YDT-6 was struck from the Navy list on 8 May 1946 and turned over to the Maritime Commission for disposal. She was reacquired by her original owner, John G. Murley, on 20 December 1946, and resumed her prewar fishing pursuits.
