= Zenda =

Zenda may refer to:

== Places ==
- Zenda, Ontario, Canada, a small village
- Zenda, Kansas, United States, a small town
- Zenda, Wisconsin, United States, a small community
- Zenda, Virginia, United States, a small community in the Shenandoah Valley founded by newly freed slaves

== Arts ==
- Zenda (film), 2010 Indian political drama
- Zenda (musical) (1963), based on The Prisoner of Zenda

== Other uses ==
- Zenda (horse), a racehorse
- USS Zenda (SP-688), patrol vessel of the United States Navy, 1917–1919

== See also ==
- The Prisoner of Zenda, an 1894 novel by Anthony Hope which has been adapted for theater and film
- Zendaman, a Japanese anime television series and the third season of the series Time Bokan
- Zenda, a main antagonist of Prezzemolo, Italian animated TV series about a dino-dog
