= USS Guinevere (IX-67) =

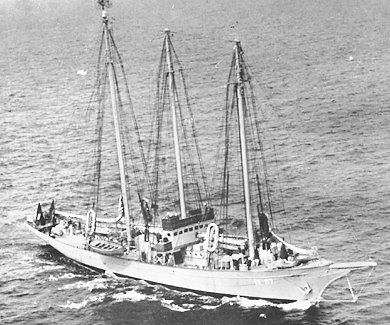
- USS Guinevere (IX-67)

History

United States
- Namesake: Previous name retained
- Builder: George S. Lawley & Sons, Neponset, MA
- Yard number: 892
- Launched: 21 April 1921
- Acquired: 24 March 1942
- Commissioned: 16 June 1942
- Decommissioned: 2 August 1945
- Stricken: 13 August 1945
- Identification: Official Number: 221611
- Fate: Sold to private owner

General characteristics
- Displacement: 503 tons
- Length: 195 ft (59 m)
- Beam: 32 ft 6 in (9.91 m)
- Draught: 15 ft (4.6 m)

USS Guinevere (IX-67) was a patrol vessel of the United States Navy that operated in service from 1942 to 1945.

== Yacht ==
Guinevere was built for Edgar Palmer of New York who specified diesel electric propulsion for what was at the time the largest such yacht built in the United States and the largest fore and aft schooner yacht so far built worldwide. The yacht's power plant consisted of two Winton six-cylinder, 350 hp (260 kW) diesel engines directly connected to Westinghouse generators. The generators provided power to a 555 hp (414 kW) Westinghouse motor directly coupled to the propeller. Design was by A. Loring Swansey with the diesel electric design in cooperation with a Commander Fisher, USN. The yacht was rated for a speed of 11.5 knots (21.3 km/h; 13.2 mph) under engines alone with 11,000 mi (18,000 km) cruising range. A two-ton refrigeration unit, two 15 kilowatt generators, bilge and other pumps, ventilation, power hoists, lights and radio were provided within the electrical system. Batteries provided power at night when the power plant was shut down or in emergencies. Guinevere was built by George Lawley & Son, of Neponset, Massachusetts, and launched 21 April 1921.

The finished yacht had six large staterooms with an additional on the deck with a private stairway to spaces below. Interior trim was entirely of walnut and teak. Auxiliary boats consisted of a 30 ft 5.5 in (9.284 m) owner's launch, a 25 ft 11.5 in (7.912 m) crew launch, and a 21 ft 3 in (6.48 m) sailing lifeboat; all except lifeboat powered.

Guinevere was requisitioned by the War Shipping Administration and allocated to the Navy on the outbreak of war.

== U. S. Navy service ==
USS Guinevere (IX-67), an unclassified miscellaneous vessel, was the second ship of the United States Navy of that name. In both cases the name was given by the ship's former owner, possibly for Queen Guinevere or another woman named for her. The auxiliary schooner was acquired from Edgar Palmer on 24 March 1942, and commissioned on 16 June 1942 at Brooklyn, New York.

After a brief shakedown, Guinevere performed harbor patrol at Boston, Massachusetts, escorted newly formed convoys out to sea, and periodically sailed to patrol off the coast of Greenland. She decommissioned on 2 August 1945 and her name was struck from the Naval Vessel Register on 13 August. She was transferred to the Maritime Commission for sale into private ownership on 25 April 1946.

== Post war ==
In 1947 the yacht was operated as an undocumented vessel by David Johnson of East St. Louis, Illinois. Washington, D.C. columnist Tom Kelly served aboard and gathered old shipmates for his 75th birthday. Some had attempted to find what happened to the vessel after it vanished from records after ownership by David Johnson. They had been unable to find a solid trace despite rumors ranging from Greece to South America. Arthur Kimberly, later associated with the brigantine Romance, became chief mate aboard Guinevere after graduation from the United States Merchant Marine Academy and finishing war service as an officer on oil tankers. At the time Guinevere was engaged as a trading vessel with cargo of sugar (Note: A cargo of sugar transported "to" the Mediterranean indicates the rumors heard by her former crew were possibly accurate as sugar most likely came from tropical America.) and occasional contraband (cigarettes are mentioned) to the Mediterranean. Despite his affection for the vessel the smuggling was the cause for his leaving while in the Mediterranean.
