= USS Aide De Camp =

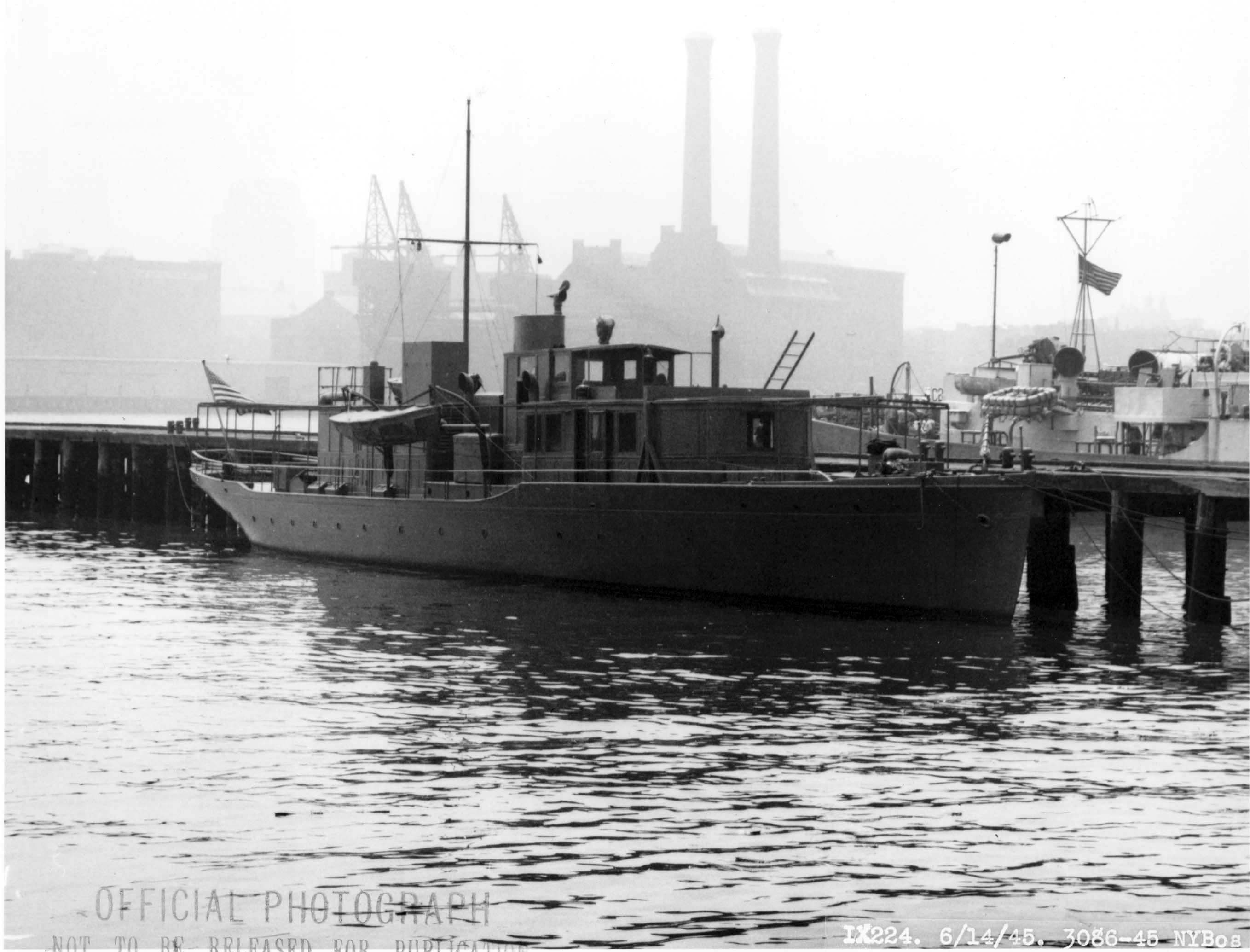
- Broadside view of USS Aide De Camp (IX-224) at the Navy Local Defense Force base (Lockwood's Basin) base in East Boston, Mass., 14 June 1945.

History

United States
- Name: USS Aide De Camp (IX-224)
- Builder: George Lawley & Sons, Corp., Neponset, Massachusetts.
- Launched: 1922
- Acquired: 31 May 1945
- In service: 18 June 1945
- Out of service: 2 November 1945
- Stricken: 28 November 1945
- Fate: Sold by the Maritime Administration, circa 1946–47

General characteristics
- Displacement: 167 t
- Length: 110 ft (34 m)
- Beam: 18 ft 2 in (5.54 m)
- Speed: 15 knots (28 km/h)

USS Aide De Camp (IX-224)—a wooden-hulled motor yacht designed by B. T. Dobson—was built in 1922 at Neponset, Massachusetts by the George Lawley & Sons boatyard for the noted yarn manufacturer, Samuel Agar Salvage, whom she served as Colleen.

The future governor of New Hampshire, John Gilbert Winant, bought the yacht from Karl W. Erikon of New York City in late 1926, or early 1927, and renamed her Ranger. About a year later, H. M. Pierce of Red Lion, Del., owned the ship and renamed her Poinsettia. In 1931, the Boston financier Frederick Henry Prince purchased the yacht and dubbed her Aide De Camp, a name which she bore under her next owners, in turn, Frank D. Comerford and Harvard University.

Early in World War II, the yacht was turned over to the university's Underwater Sound Laboratory and was used in experimental work to develop and improve sonar equipment, and to develop antisubmarine warfare tactics. Sometime later, (the records of the transfer have apparently perished) the ship came into the custody of the Office of Scientific Research and Development, for whom she continued this work.

After the surrender of Germany, the vessel was transferred to the Navy on 31 May 1945 and was placed in service on 18 June 1945.

Upon her activation, the vessel was delivered to Commander, 7th Naval District and assigned to operations for the Bureau of Ordnance conducting underwater sound research while based at Fort Lauderdale, FL. At the conclusion of this mission, she was placed out of service on 2 November 1945; and her name was struck from the Navy list on 28 November 1945. The vessel was transferred to the Maritime Administration on 4 September 1946 and sold.

In private hands, she long remained in Florida waters, serving Gustave G. Copeland of Miami in 1949 and Fred Bowman of DeLand in 1951. Still carrying the name Aide De Camp, the yacht shifted her home port to Pensacola in 1953. Some two years later, she was acquired by the Kennedy Marine Engine Co.; began commercial operations for that firm from Biloxi, MS, under the name Mariner 1; and remained in that status into the 1980s.
