= Aubrey Crocker =

American sailor

- Born: Provincetown, Massachusetts
- Died: June 23, 1906; Cohasset, Massachusetts, U.S.
- Occupation: Yachtsman

Aubrey Crocker was a yachting skipper in the United States during the 19th century. He captained the Puritan in 1885, winner of the America's Cup, the world's oldest international sporting competition.

== Early years ==
Crocker was born in Provincetown. He learned about the sea from his father starting at the age of ten. He demonstrated his proficiency in sailing yachts after commanding a boat called the Shadow, the only American boat to defeat a famous British cutter named Madge.

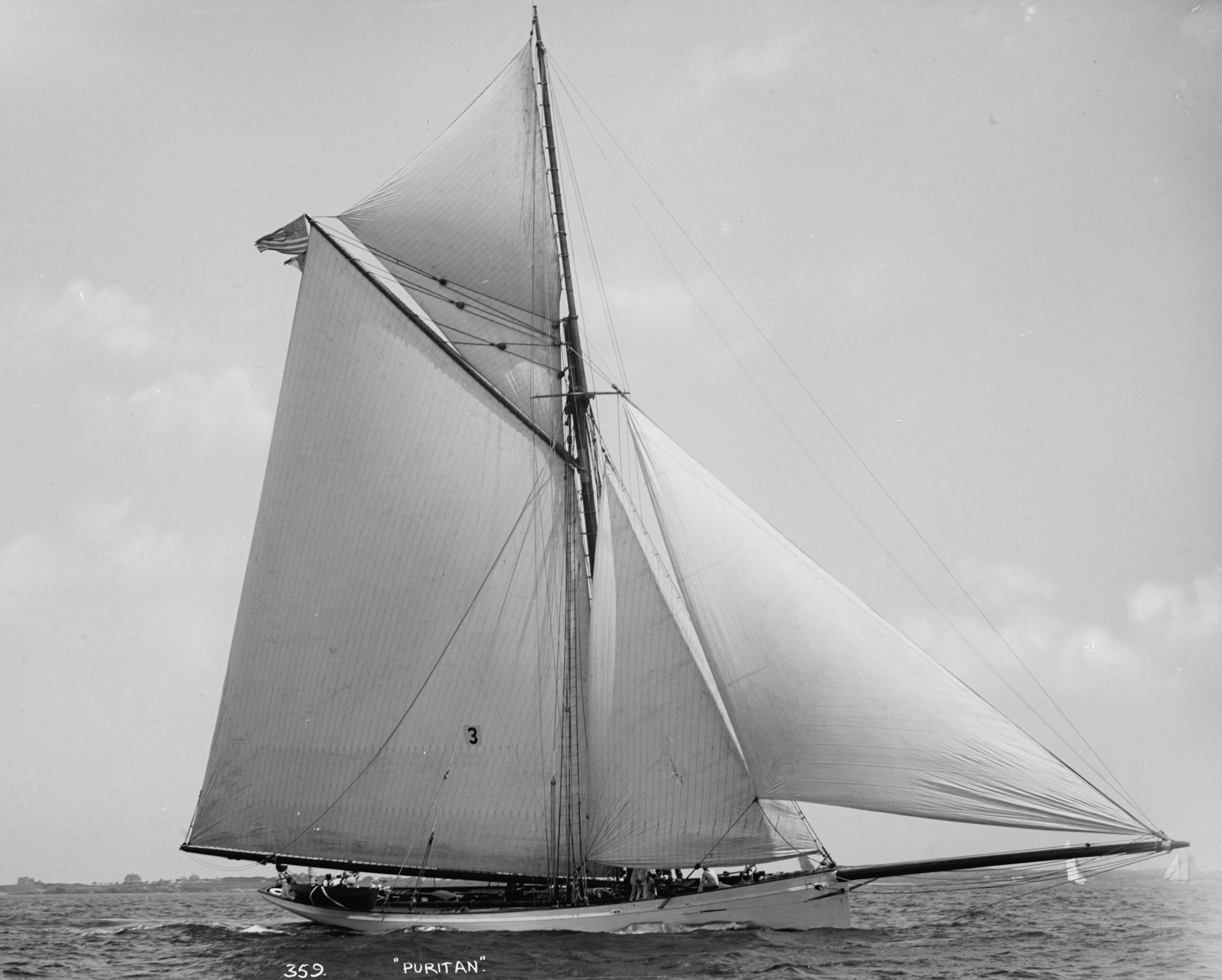
Puritan as photographed by John S. Johnston.

== America's Cup ==
Based on his experience and successful record, Crocker was selected to skipper the Puritan first in August 1885 in the Goelet Cup trials which pitted his boat against the Priscilla. After his victory, he went on in September 1885 to sail Puritan against the British entry Genesta. He was assisted by Captain Joe Ellsworth.

Following that triumph, he was also invited to sail on two other America's Cup competitors, the Volunteer and Mayflower in the capacity of an advisor.

== Goelet Cup ==
In 1897, Crocker steered the Navahoe to victory in the prestigious Goelet Cup over the yacht Vigilant, the defender of the 1893 America's Cup. Both yachts were designed by the Herreshoff brothers, Nathanael Greene Herreshoff and John Brown Herreshoff.

== Death ==
Crocker died at 68 years old of Bright's disease.
