= USS Shrewsbury =

Patrol vessel of the United States Navy

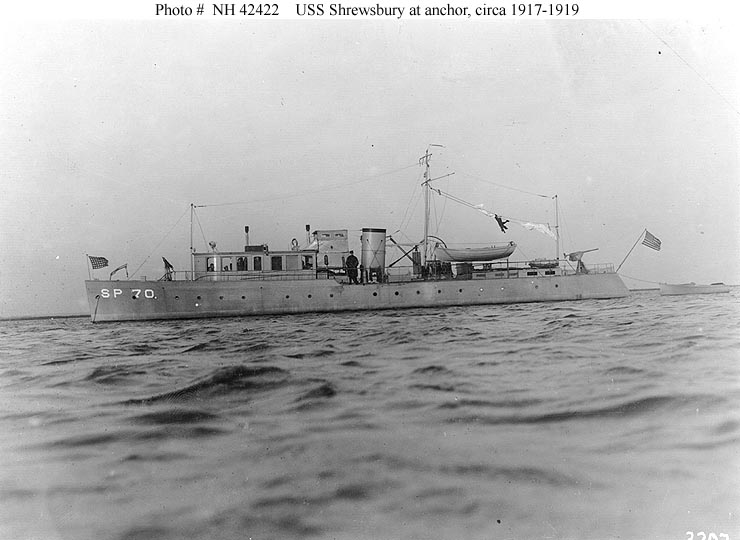
- USS Shrewsbury at anchor

History

United States
- Name: USS Shrewsbury
- Namesake: Previous name retained
- Builder: George Lawley & Son, Neponset, Massachusetts
- Completed: 1910
- Acquired: 13 April 1917
- Commissioned: 23 April 1917
- Stricken: 16 September 1919
- Fate: Sold 20 October 1919 or 29 October 1919
- Notes: Operated as private motorboat Mona, Gipsy, Topsy, and Shrewsbury 1910-1917

General characteristics
- Type: Patrol vessel
- Tonnage: 77 tons
- Length: 98 ft (30 m)
- Beam: 15 ft (4.6 m)
- Draft: 5 ft 3 in (1.60 m)
- Speed: 14.5 knots
- Complement: 15
- Armament: 1 × 1-pounder gun; 2 × machine guns

USS Shrewsbury (SP-70) was an armed motorboat that served in the United States Navy as a patrol vessel from 1917 to 1919.

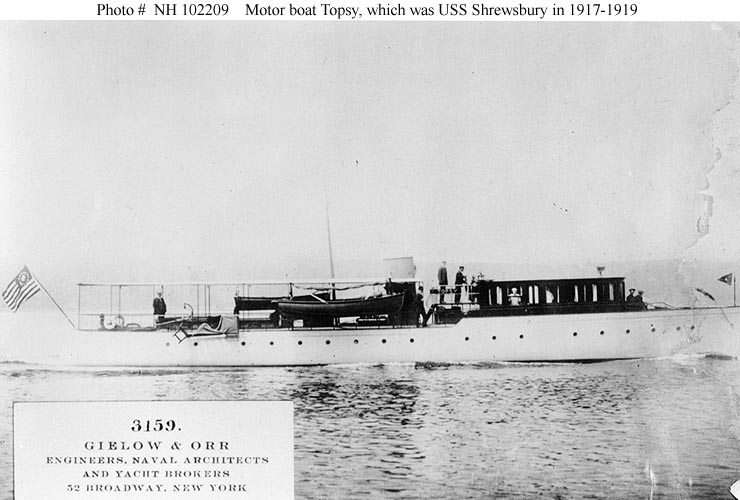
Shrewsbury as the private motorboat Topsy prior to her U.S. Navy service.

Shrewsbury was built in 1910 by George Lawley & Son at Neponset, Massachusetts, as the private motorboat Mona. In private use, she subsequently was renamed Gipsy (according to one source), then Topsy. She had been renamed Shrewsbury by the time the U.S. Navy acquired her from her owner, N. H. McCarter of Newark, New Jersey, on 13 April 1917 for World War I service. She was commissioned as USS Shrewsbury (SP-70) on 23 April 1917.

Shrewsbury patrolled in the 4th Naval District along the central United States East Coast during World War I.

Stricken from the Navy List on 16 September 1919, Shrewsbury was sold on 20 October 1919 or 29 October 1919 to Charles S. McCullough of New York City.
