= USS Gem =

Steam yacht and US Navy patrol vessel

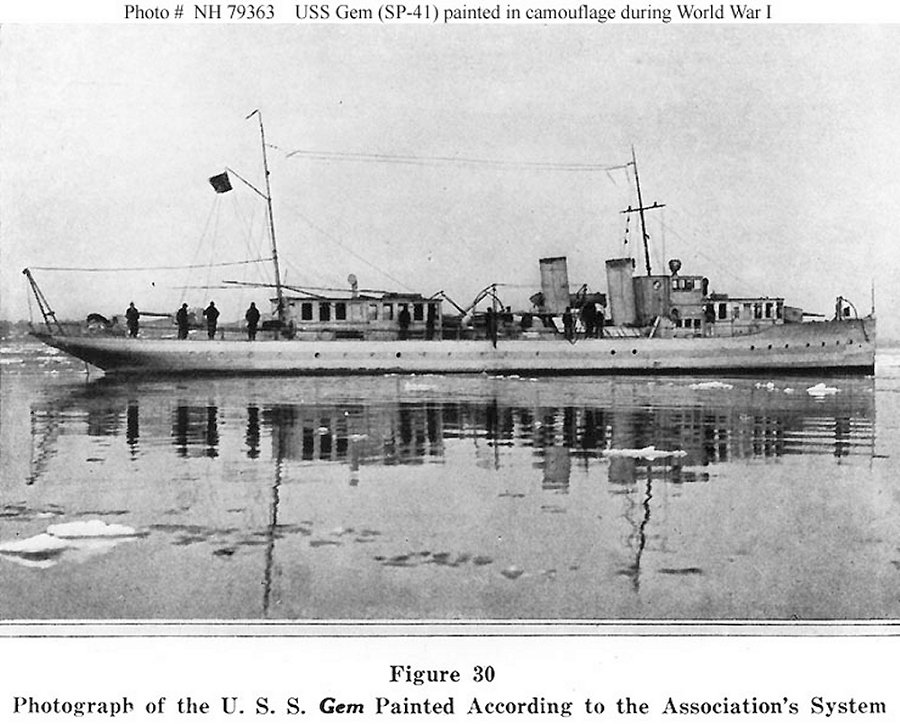
- USS Gem in World War I

History

United States
- Name: USS Gem
- Namesake: Previous name retained
- Builder: George Lawley & Son, Neponset, MA
- Completed: 1913
- Acquired: 26 March 1917
- Commissioned: 1 June 1917
- Decommissioned: 10 January 1919
- Fate: Returned to owner 10 January 1919
- Notes: Operated as private steam yacht Gem 1913–1917 and from 1919

General characteristics
- Type: Patrol vessel
- Tonnage: 201 GRT, 113 NRT
- Length: 149.2 ft (45.5 m)
- Beam: 18.0 ft (5.5 m)
- Draft: 7 ft (2.1 m)
- Depth: 10.1 ft (3.1 m)
- Installed power: 32 NHP
- Propulsion: 2 × 4-cylinder triple-expansion engines; 2 × screws
- Speed: 15 knots (28 km/h)
- Armament: 2 × 3-pounder guns

USS Gem (SP-41) was an armed yacht that served in the United States Navy as a patrol vessel from 1917 to 1919.

Gem was built in 1913 as a private steam-powered yacht of the same name by George Lawley & Son at Neponset, Massachusetts. The US Navy acquired her under charter from her owner, William Ziegler Jr., on 26 March 1917 for World War I service. She was commissioned as USS Gem (SP-41) on 1 June 1917 at New York City.

Gem performed harbor entrance patrol at New Haven, Connecticut, until 12 December 1917. She was then assigned to experimental work under the Submarine Defense Association. In this duty, carried out at New York City; New London, Connecticut; Newport, Rhode Island; and New Haven, she experimented with camouflage defense, tested the Bates Automatic Course Indicator, and experimented with various submarine detection devices, including the Sanborn Speed Indicator. She also performed colloidal fuel experiments with pulverized coal at New Haven and New York.

The Navy decommissioned Gem on 10 January 1919 and returned her to her owner the same day.
