= USS Kingfisher (SP-76) =

Patrol vessel of the United States Navy

History

United States
- Name: USS Kingfisher
- Builder: George Lawley & Son
- Laid down: 1916
- Acquired: 8 May 1917
- Commissioned: 15 May 1917
- Decommissioned: 22 January 1919
- Home port: New London, Connecticut
- Fate: Returned to owner, 4 March 1919

General characteristics
- Type: Commercial motor launch
- Displacement: 17 long tons (17 t)
- Length: 60 ft (18 m)
- Beam: 10 ft 9 in (3.28 m)
- Draft: 3 ft (0.91 m)
- Speed: 26 knots (48 km/h; 30 mph)
- Complement: Varied
- Armament: 1 × 11-pounder gun; 1 × .30 caliber machine gun

USS Kingfisher (SP-76), a motor launch, was built in 1916 by George Lawley & Sons, Neponset, Massachusetts; acquired by the U.S. Navy on 8 May 1917 from her owner, R. P. Mathiesson, Chicago, Illinois; and commissioned 15 May at Newport, Rhode Island.

Assigned to the 2nd Naval District, Newport, Rhode Island, Kingfisher enrolled in the Naval Coast Defense Reserve on 9 June. Based at New London, Connecticut, she patrolled Long Island Sound.

On 7 January 1919 she was ordered returned to her former owner. USS Kingfisher was decommissioned on 22 January, and turned over to her previous owner on 4 March.
