= George Lawley & Son =

Coordinates: 42.293°N 71.042°W

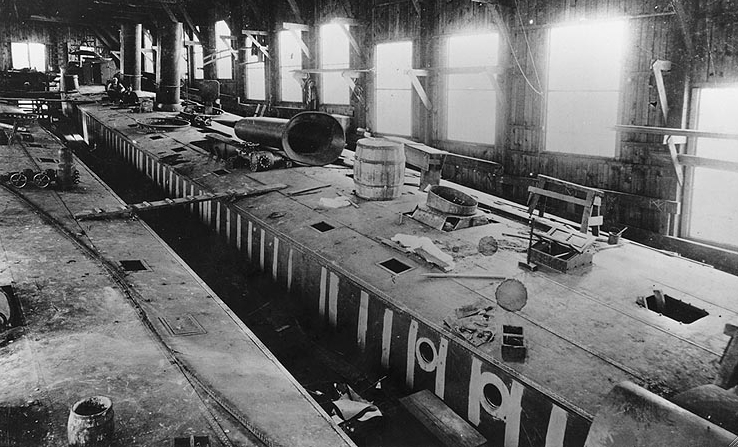
United States Navy torpedo boat USS DeLong (TB-28) under construction in the George Lawley & Son shipyard, Boston, 1900

George Lawley & Son was a shipbuilding firm operating in Massachusetts from 1866 to 1945. It began in Scituate, then moved to Boston. After founder George Lawley (1823–1915) retired in 1890, his son, grandson and great-grandson upheld the business, which continued until 1945. Of the hundreds of ships built by the Lawleys, highlights include the yachts Puritan and Mayflower, respective winners of the 1885 and 1886 America's Cup.

== Brief history ==
Founder George Lawley (1823–1915) was born to a "family of boatbuilders in Limehouse (London), England." He "began his career as an apprentice to Thomas and William Forrest while in England." In 1852 Lawley "moved his family to Massachusetts." He "found his first job in America with the East Boston ship designer, Donald McKay." Lawley worked for McKay from 1852 until 1866.

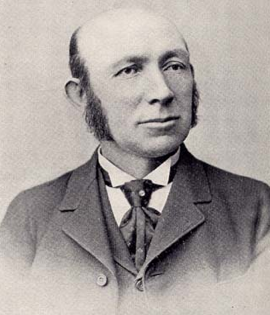
George F. Lawley (1848-1928)

=== Scituate, 1866–1874 ===
In 1866, "Lawley and fellow [McKay] worker William Maybury opened a shipyard in Scituate ... for the construction of pleasure boats." When George's son George Frederick Lawley (1848–1928) "joined the business ... the company name became George Lawley and Son."

=== South Boston, 1874 – c. 1909 ===
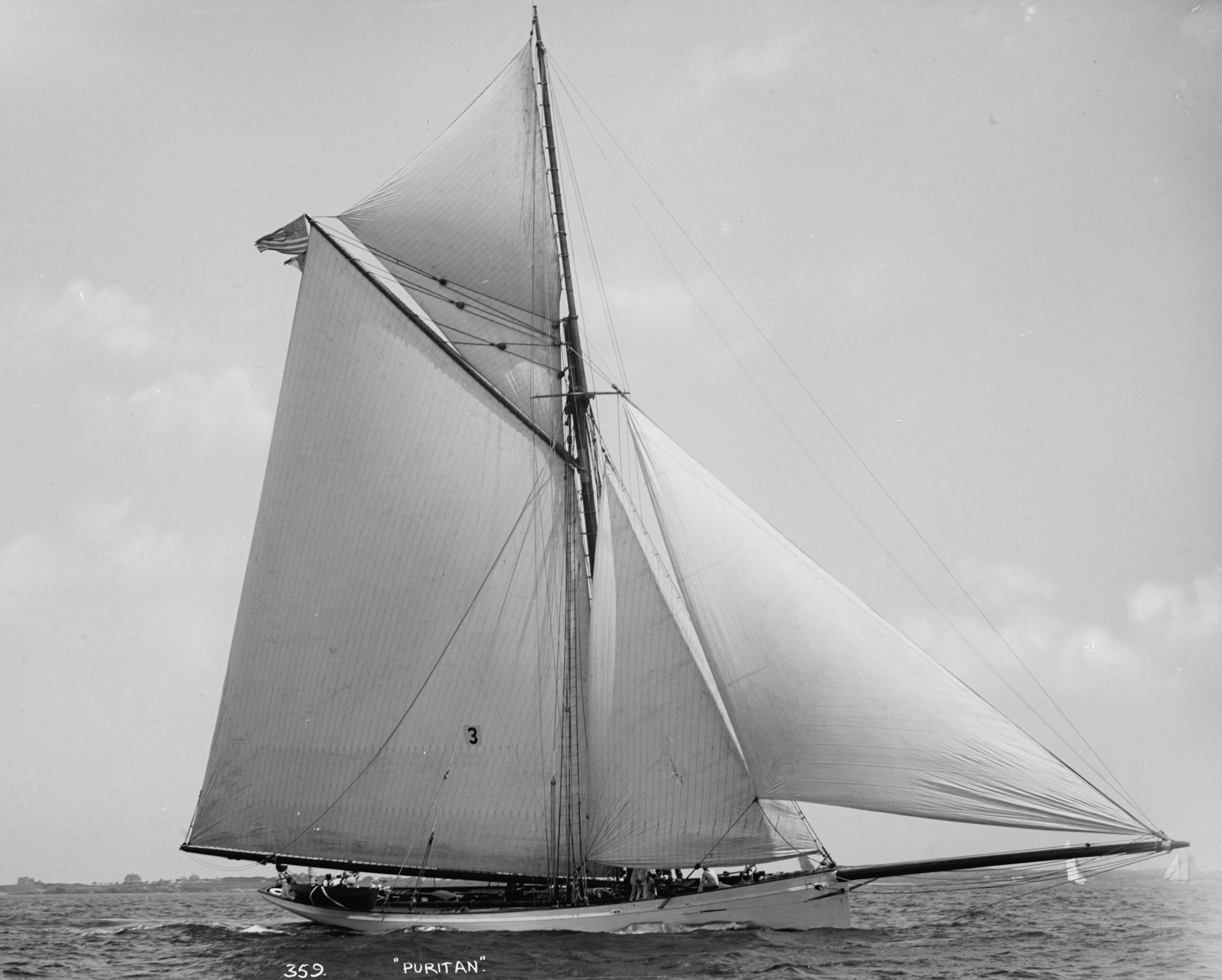
Puritan, (Edward Burgess, 1886)

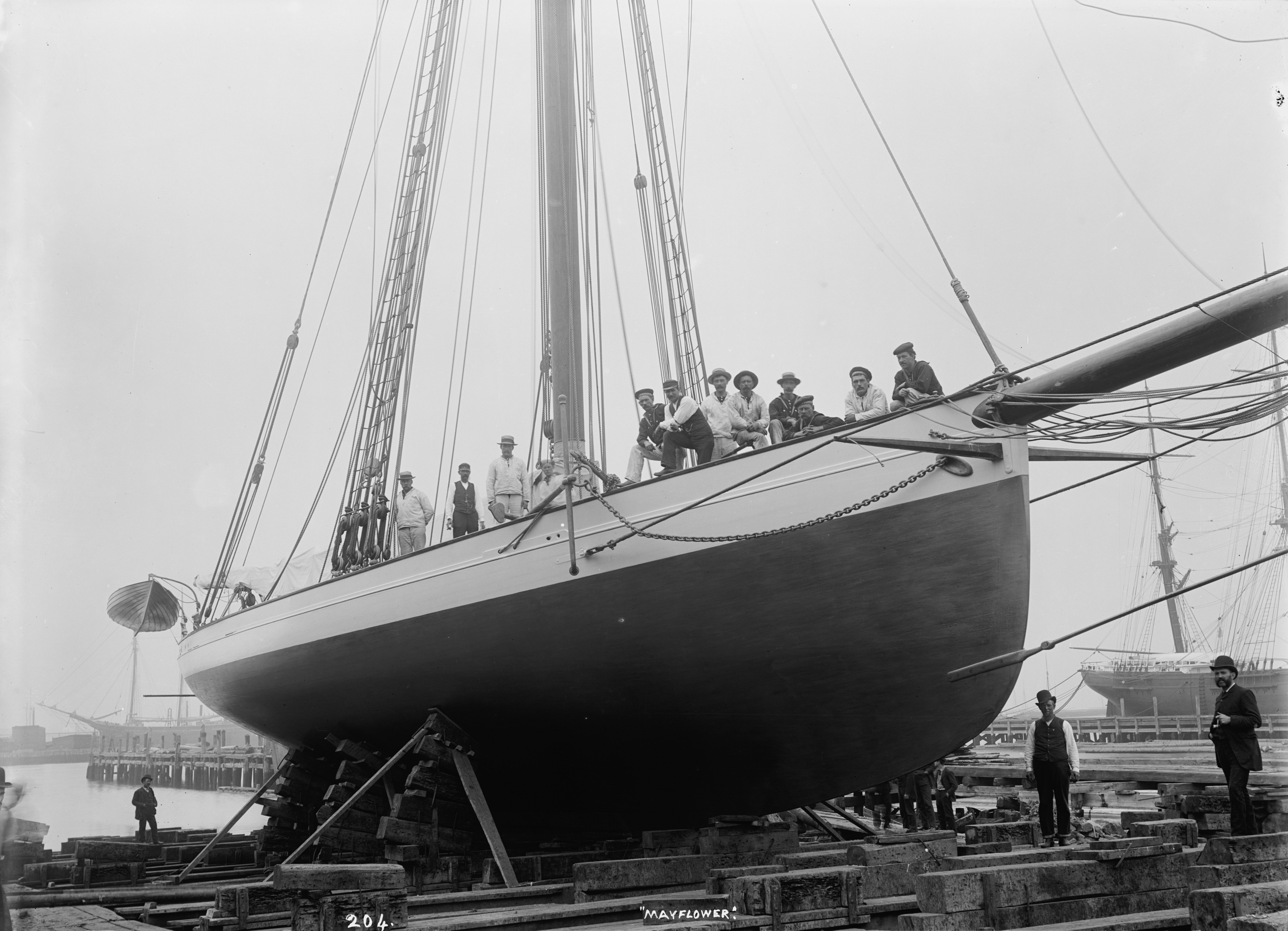
Mayflower, (Edward Burgess, 1885)

"In 1874 the yachting boom struck, and the firm transferred its yard to a more advantageous location near the city, a fairly large lot next to the Boston Yacht Club station at City Point in South Boston." The city directory of 1875 locates George Lawley & Son at the "rear Horse Car Stables." "Within a few years, the demand for new yachts became so great that the plant was moved to the north side of City Point." From ca.1887 through ca.1892 the city directory locates the firm at East First and O Street, South Boston.

"In 1890 the Lawleys associated with them Mr. Thomas Hibbard, who looked after the construction of the new steel shops. The business was then incorporated. ... Mr. George Lawley, founder of the business, practically retired from active participation in the enterprise. Mr. George F. Lawley was elected president of the corporation." "In 1901 the Lawleys began working for the United States Navy and launched two torpedo boats. In the years to come they would continue the association, especially during the World War I." George's grandson, Frederick D. Lawley (1878–1953), "studied naval architecture at the Massachusetts Institute of Technology and subsequently joined the company as manager and designer" around 1902.

By 1908, the firm had built over 800 ships, including "schooners Alcaea, Ingomar, Oonas, Idler, Latona, Endymion; the sloops Jubilee, Weetamoe, Wayward, Katonah, Independence; the steam yachts Alcedo, Aquilo, Satilla, Thetis, Kaleda, Carmina, Calumet, Anona, Visitor, Cigarette, Kehtoh, and Halawa; the three-masted auxiliary schooner Alcyone; the motor launches Zeeland, Elkhorn, Tonopah, Glenda, and Hupa." The firm employed "200 to 400 hands, the majority of whom are highly-skilled mechanics."

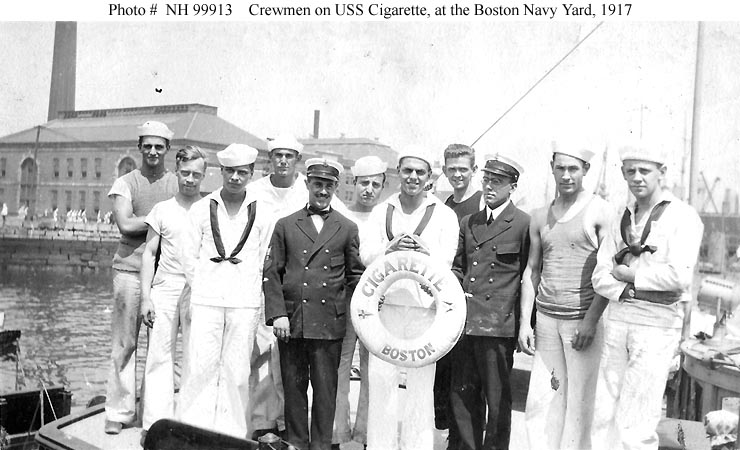
Crewmen on USS Cigarette (SP-1234), Boston, 1917

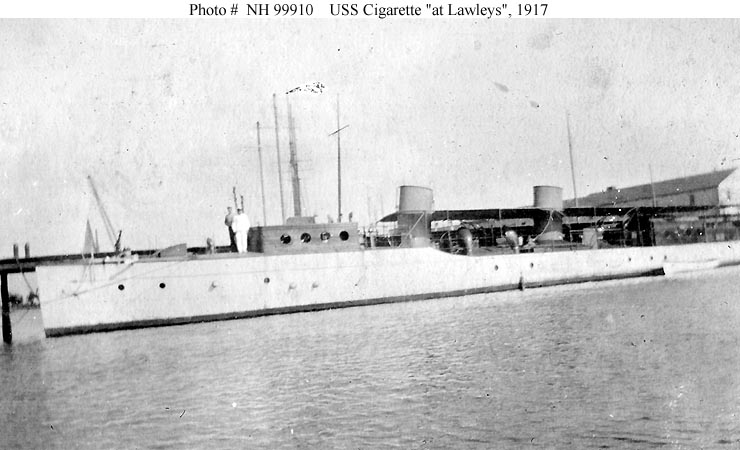
USS Cigarette, Boston, 1917

=== Dorchester, c. 1909 – 1946 ===
Around 1908–1910, the firm "was practically crowded out of its City Point yard ... by an overflow of work, and inability to expand, so the plant was moved across Dorchester Bay to the old Putnam Nail Works at Neponset."

"In 1921 the Guinevere was built at the Neponset yard. It was the first yacht ever fitted with Diesel oil engines motoring her electric Westinghouse equipment which propelled the boat, hoisted the sails, lighted, heated and "cooked" the craft, and twirled the big gyroscope which keeps the boat on even keel."

=== Neponset World War 2 production ===
"In 1926, George, Frederick and George II (b. 1901) left the company and set up F. D. Lawley in Quincy, Massachusetts." The firm of George Lawley & Son continued on in Neponset until it ceased in 1945–1946.

During World War II, the Neponset George Lawley and Son shipyard was instrumental in helping to design and build over 100 Landing Craft Infantry (Large) ships. The Lawley shipyard was the primary design yard and their drawings were shared by 9 other U.S. shipyards all building LCI(L) for the war effort. Lawley's Neponset shipyard was also asked by the U.S. Navy to pioneer the design and development of Landing Craft Support ships.

The LCS(L)3 ships, ("Mighty Midgets") used the same hull and propulsion systems as the LCI(L), but had no facilities for landing troops on the beach. These well armed ships were requested by the US Navy in response to a need for a shallow draft ship that could approach the beaches and give substantial direct naval gunfire support (NGFS) to the newly landed troops. This request came about after the US Marine Corps invasion of Tarawa, where there was an absence of close-in gunfire support of this type. Lawley built around 50 of these LCS ships and shared the design with Commercial Iron Works and Albina Engine and Machine Works shipyards, both in Portland, Oregon. A total of 130 LCS(L)3 ships were built during WW2.

In 1942 the controversial founder of the Church of Scientology, L. Ron Hubbard, then a lieutenant in the U.S. Navy, was briefly assigned to the shipyard to oversee the conversion of the fishing trawler M/V Mist into the Navy patrol craft YP-422.

== Ships ==
South Boston, 1874-ca.1909

- Endymion
- Merlin
- Sachem
- Marguerite
- Puritan, America's Cup defender designed by Edward Burgess and launched on May 26, 1885.
- Mayflower, America's Cup defender designed by Edward Burgess, and built and launched in 1886.
- Elf, built as a racing boat in 1888.
- USS Inca, a screw steamer, was built in 1898.
- USS Blakely (TB-27), laid down on 12 January 1899, and launched on 22 November 1900.
- USS DeLong (TB-28), launched 23 November 1900.
- USS Pawnee (SP-699), a wooden-hulled yacht, was built in 1904.
- USS Lady Mary (SP-212), built as the civilian yacht Glenda in 1905. Eventually renamed Lady Mary.
- USS Cigarette (SP-1234), built as a private motorboat in 1905
- USS Wanderlust (SP-923), designed by F. D. Lawley and built for George G. Peters of Boston, Massachusetts. Completed in 1907 with the name Faalua, she was subsequently owned in turn by Sherburn M. Becker and E. J. Steiner, both of New York City. Apparently Steiner purchased her in 1913 and renamed her Wanderlust.
- USS Zipalong (SP-3), a wooden-hulled motorboat built in 1907 with the name Gansetta. Subsequently, Gansetta was renamed Zipalong.

Dorchester, c. 1909 – 1946

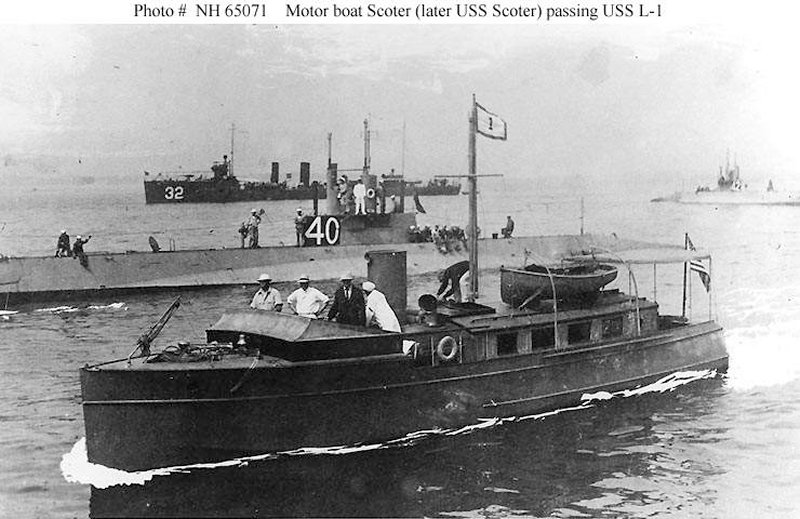
Scoter, ca.1916

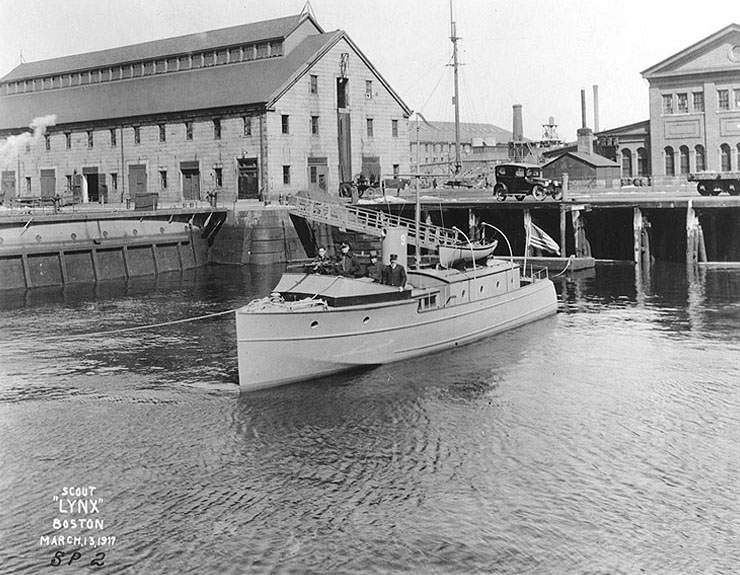
USS Lynx, Boston, 1917

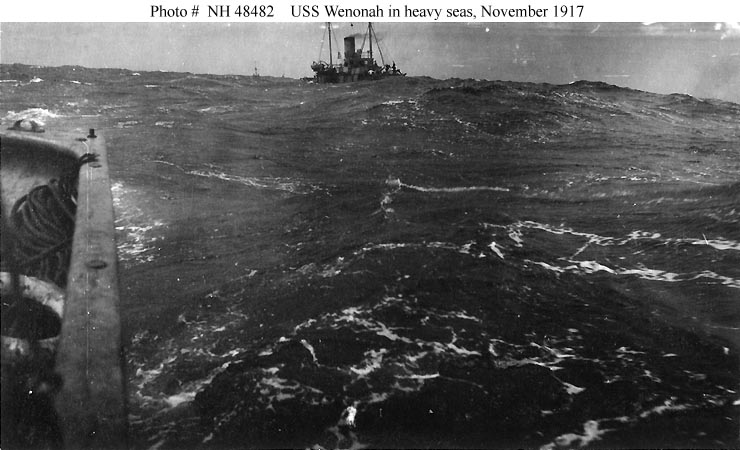
USS Wenonah, 1917

- USS Eaglet (SP-909), a motorboat built in either 1909 or 1911[2].
- USS Taniwha (SP-129), built as a civilian yacht in 1909.
- USS Shrewsbury (SP-70), built in 1910, as the private motorboat Mona.
- USS Zenda (SP-688), a wooden-hulled motorboat built in 1912.
- USS Gem (SP-41), built in 1913 as a private steam-powered yacht.
- USS Hiawatha (SP-183), built as the civilian steam yacht Donaire in 1914.
- DN-1, the United States Navy's first airship, for which George Lawley & Son built the gondola control car, ca.1916.
- USS Edamena II (SP-14), built in 1916.
- USS Kingfisher (SP-76), motor launch, built in 1916.
- USS Lynx (SP-2), motorboat built in 1916.
- USS Scoter (SP-20), built in 1916.
- USS Venture (SP-616), wooden-hulled, screw steam yacht designed by F. D. Lawley and completed as Shadow in 1916.
- USS Orca (SP-726), built prior to 1917, as the steam yacht Monaloa. Later renamed Orca.
- USS Rivalen (SP-63), a wooden motorboat built in 1917.
- USS Guinevere (IX-67), built as an auxiliary schooner in 1921.
- HMCS Oriole (KC-480), built in 1921 for the Royal Canadian Yacht Club and commissioned into the Canadian Navy in 1952.
- USS Aide De Camp (IX-21), built in 1922 as the yacht Coleen.
- MV Camargo, built in 1928 as a yacht.
- USS Sapphire (PYc-2), a private yacht and later a United States Navy training vessel, built in 1929. Originally named Buccaneer.
