= USS Zenda =

Patrol vessel of the United States Navy

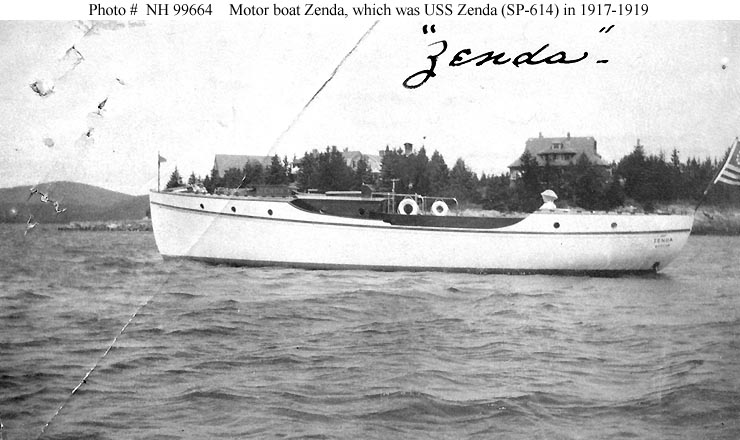
- USS ZendaMotorboat Zenda in private use in a harbor in the northeastern United States sometime between 1912 and 1917, prior to U.S. Navy service as USS Zenda (SP-235)

History

United States
- Name: USS Zenda
- Namesake: Previous name retained
- Builder: George Lawley & Son, Neponset, Massachusetts
- Completed: 1912
- Acquired: 19 May 1917
- Commissioned: 13 June 1917
- Stricken: 30 January 1919
- Fate: Returned to owners 30 January 1919
- Notes: Operated as private motorboat Zenda 1912-1917 from early 1919

General characteristics
- Type: Patrol vessel
- Length: 48 ft 0 in (14.63 m)
- Beam: 10 ft 0 in (3.05 m)
- Draft: 3 ft 7 in (1.09 m) mean
- Speed: 10 knots
- Complement: 6
- Armament: 1 × Lewis machine gun

USS Zenda (SP-688) was an armed motorboat that served in the United States Navy as a patrol vessel from 1917 to 1919.

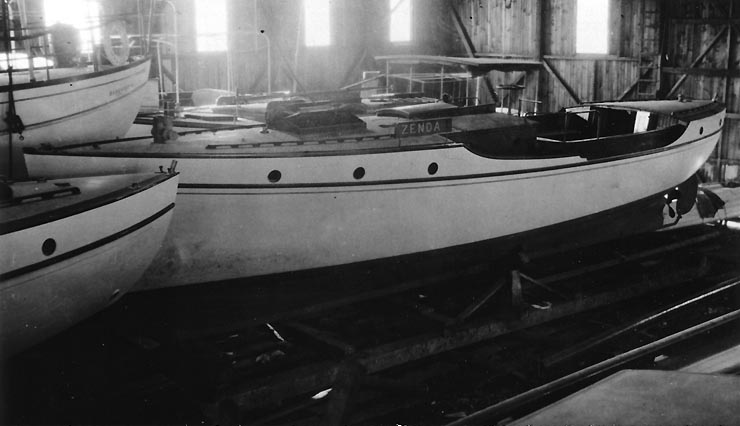
Zenda in a boathouse while in private use between 1912 and 1917.

Zenda was a wooden-hulled motorboat built in 1912 at Neponset, Massachusetts, by George Lawley & Son. She was acquired by the U.S. Navy on 19 May 1917 from Mr. Francis S. Eaton for service with the section patrol during World War I. Commissioned on 25 June 1917, she served in the 1st Naval District in eastern New England waters as a district patrol craft for the duration of the war.

Decommissioned soon after the armistice, she was returned to her owner on 30 January 1919, and her name was struck from the Navy Directory that same day.
