= USS Hiawatha (SP-183) =

Patrol vessel of the United States Navy

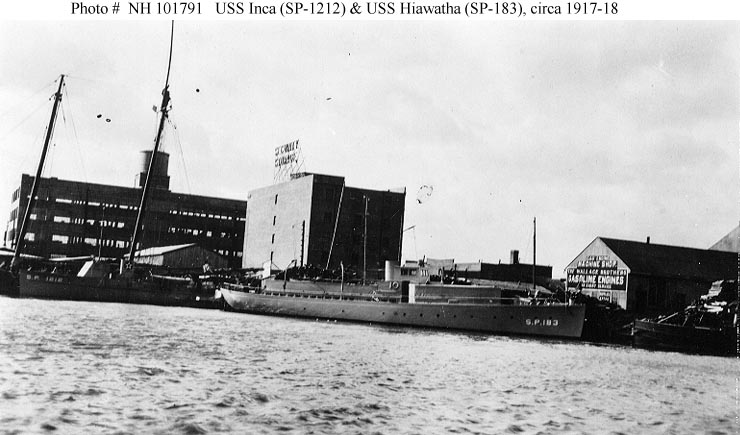
- USS Hiawatha in the Norfolk, Virginia, area in 1917-1918. Patrol vessel USS Inca (SP-1212) is at left, bearing the Naval Aviation star insignia.

History

United States
- Name: USS Hiawatha
- Namesake: Hiawatha, a leader of the Onondaga and Mohawk nations of Native Americans and a fictional character in Henry Wadsworth Longfellow's 1855 poem The Song of Hiawatha
- Builder: George Lawley & Son, Neponset, Massachusetts
- Completed: 1914
- Commissioned: 10 May 1917
- Fate: Loaned to Maryland State Conservation Commission 11 December 1919-16 March 1920; Sold to U.S. Department of Agriculture 1 October 1920
- Notes: Operated as civilian yacht Donaire 1914-1917

General characteristics
- Type: Patrol vessel
- Displacement: 89 tons
- Length: 98 ft (30 m)
- Beam: 17 ft (5.2 m)
- Draft: 5 ft (1.5 m)
- Propulsion: Steam engine
- Speed: 10 knots
- Armament: 1 × 3-pounder gun; 1 × 1-pounder gun

The first USS Hiawatha (SP-183) was an armed yacht that served in the United States Navy as a patrol vessel from 1917 to 1920.

Hiawatha was built as the civilian steam yacht Donaire in 1914 by George Lawley & Son of Neponset, Massachusetts. The U.S. Navy acquired her from her owner, A. W. Stanley of Miami, Florida, for World War I service as a patrol vessel. She was commissioned as USS Hiawatha (SP-183) at the Norfolk Navy Yard in Portsmouth, Virginia, on 10 May 1917.

Assigned to the 5th Naval District, Hiawatha operated in Hampton Roads, Virginia, and vicinity as a patrol craft and dispatch boat during World War I. From August to December 1918, she was one of two U.S. Navy ships in service simultaneously as USS Hiawatha, the other being the tug USS Hiawatha (ID-2892).

After the war, Hiawatha remained inactive at Norfolk, Virginia, until loaned to the Maryland State Conservation Commission on 11 December 1919. She was returned to the U.S. Navy on 16 March 1920.

On 1 October 1920, the Navy sold Hiawatha to the U.S. Department of Agriculture, which took her to the Territory of Alaska for use in the administration of National Forests there by the United States Forest Service.
