= USS Cigarette =

Patrol vessel of the United States Navy

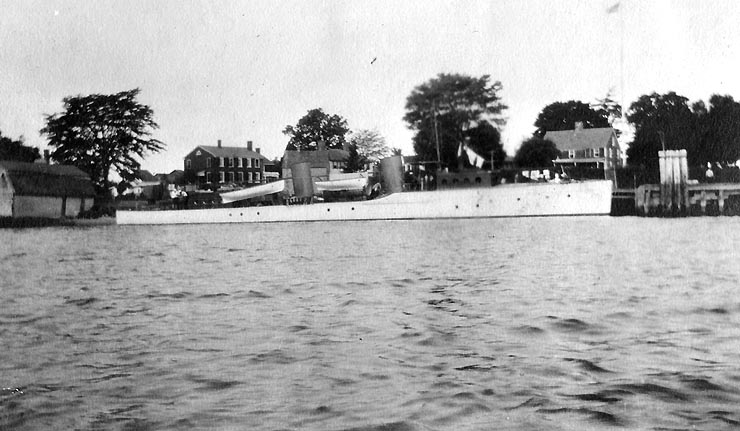
- USS Cigarette (SP-1234) at Essex, Connecticut, ca. summer 1917

History

United States
- Name: USS Cigarette
- Namesake: Previous name retained
- Builder: George Lawley & Son, Neponset, Massachusetts
- Completed: 1905
- Acquired: 17 September 1917
- Commissioned: 19 September 1917
- Decommissioned: July 1919
- Fate: Sold 29 October 1920; Scrapped 1930
- Notes: Operated as private yacht Cigarette 1905–1917 and as private yacht Pocantico 1920–1930

General characteristics
- Type: Patrol vessel
- Length: 125 ft 4 in (38.20 m)
- Beam: 14 ft 8 in (4.47 m)
- Draft: 4 ft 3 in (1.30 m)
- Propulsion: Steam: two triple expansion engines, two shafts
- Speed: 22 knots
- Complement: 21
- Armament: 1 × 1-pounder guns

USS Cigarette (SP-1234) was a patrol vessel that served in the United States Navy from 1917 to 1919.

Cigarette was built as a fast, private steam yacht of the same name in 1905 by George Lawley & Son at Neponset, Massachusetts, for C. A. Wood of Cambridge, Massachusetts. She appears to have entered U.S. Navy service by as early as mid-June 1917, but on 17 September 1917, the Navy officially purchased her from her owner for use as a patrol boat during World War I. She was commissioned as USS Cigarette (SP-1234) on 19 September 1917.

Assigned to the 1st Naval District, Cigarette served on section patrol duties in northern New England for the remainder of World War I, performing patrol duty off Boston, Massachusetts; Provincetown, Massachusetts; and Bar Harbor, Maine. She also carried out patrols at Guantánamo Bay, Cuba, probably in 1919.

Cigarette was decommissioned in July 1919 and sold on 29 October 1920. Renamed Pocantico by her new owner, she once again became a private yacht. She was scrapped in 1930.
