= USS Venture (SP-616) =

Patrol vessel of the United States Navy

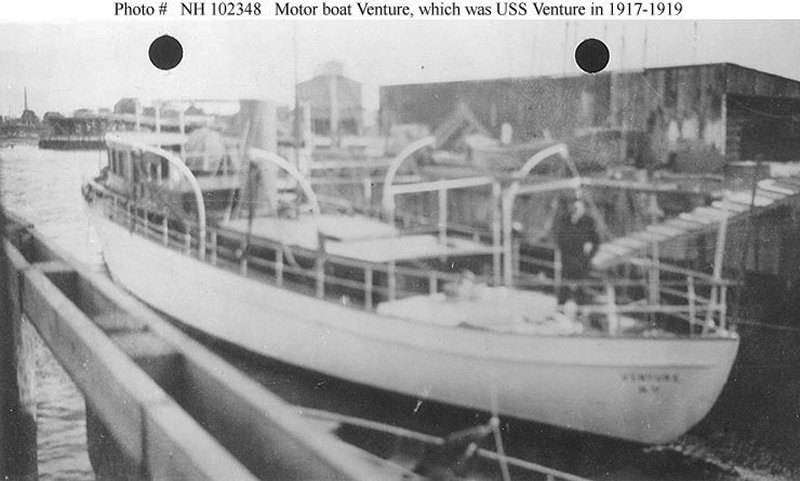

History

United States
- Name: USS Venture
- Builder: George Lawley & Son, South Boston, Massachusetts
- Laid down: 1916
- Launched: 1916
- Acquired: 28 April 1917
- Commissioned: 28 April 1917
- Decommissioned: 5 February 1919
- Stricken: date unknown
- Home port: Portsmouth Navy Yard, Kittery, Maine
- Fate: Returned to owner 1919

General characteristics
- Displacement: 48 tons (gross)
- Length: 80 ft 0 in (24.38 m)
- Beam: 13 ft 0 in (3.96 m)
- Draught: 4 ft 0 in (1.22 m)
- Speed: varied
- Complement: 14
- Armament: one three-pounder and; one one-pounder

USS Venture (SP-616) was a Venture-class patrol boat acquired by the U.S. Navy for the task of patrolling the coastal waters of the New England coast during World War I. Her primary task was to guard the coastal area against German submarines.

The first ship to be named Venture by the Navy, SP-616—a wooden-hulled, screw steam yacht designed by F. D. Lawley and completed as Shadow in 1916 at South Boston, Massachusetts, by George Lawley & Son—was acquired by the Navy under free lease from Mrs. Sarah L. Silsbee of Isleboro Island, Maine, on 28 April 1917 and commissioned the same day.

== World War I service ==
Attached to the 5th Section, 1st Naval District, Portsmouth, New Hampshire, Venture operated out of the Portsmouth Navy Yard at Kittery, Maine, through the end of World War I, conducting security patrols and performing dispatch duties.

== End-of-war decommissioning ==
Following the armistice, she was decommissioned on 5 February 1919 and returned to her owner.
