= USS Content =

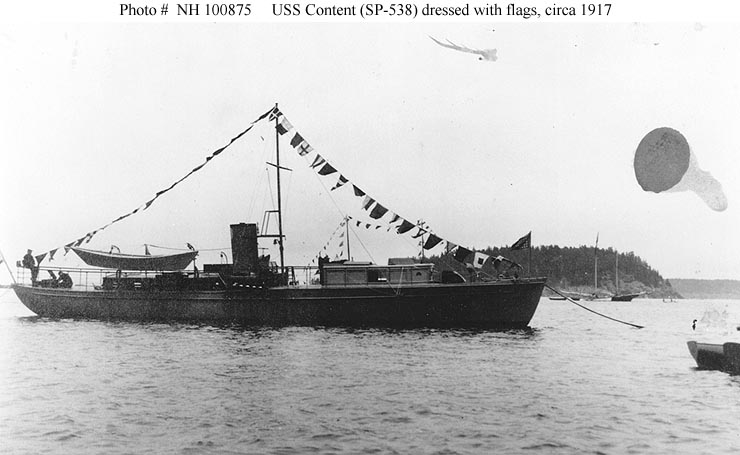
- USS Content at anchor in a New England harbor in mid-1917.

History

United States
- Name: USS Content
- Completed: 1912
- Acquired: 1917
- Commissioned: 22 May 1917
- Decommissioned: 30 January 1919
- Fate: Returned to owner 3 February 1919
- Notes: Operated as private motorboat Dolph II and Content 1912-1917

General characteristics
- Type: Patrol vessel
- Length: 74 ft 0 in (22.56 m)
- Beam: 13 ft 6 in (4.11 m)
- Draft: 4 ft 8 in (1.42 m)
- Speed: 10 knots
- Armament: 1 × 1-pounder gun

USS Content (SP-538) was a motorboat that served in the United States Navy as a patrol vessel from 1917 to 1919.

Content was built in 1912 at Port Clinton, Ohio as the civilian pleasure craft Dolph II. She was later renamed Content.

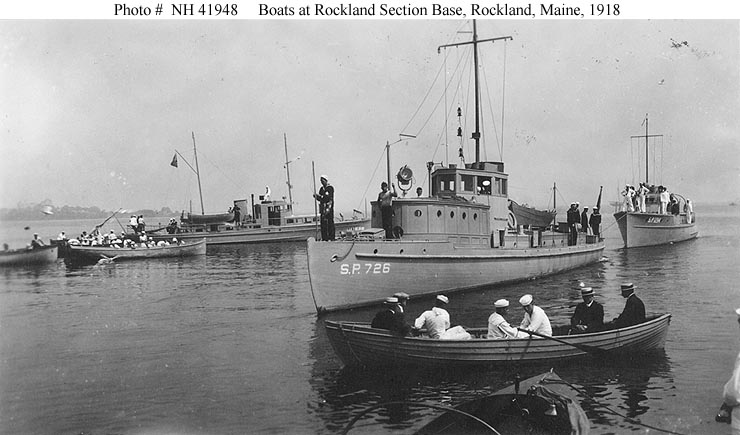
USS Content (SP-538) (left center background) exercising at Rockland Section Base, Rockland, Maine, in 1918 with patrol vessels USS Orca (SP-726) (center) and USS Kangaroo (SP-1284) (astern of Orca) and various small boats.

After the United States entered World War I, the U.S. Navy chartered Content for use as a patrol vessel. She was commissioned as USS Content (SP-538) on 22 May 1917. She was assigned to the 1st Naval District, where she patrolled in defense of coastal waters in northern New England through the end of the war.

Content was decommissioned on 30 January 1919. On 3 February 1919 she was returned to her owner.
