= Cigarettes (disambiguation) =

Cigarettes are small rolls of finely cut tobacco leaves wrapped in a cylinder of thin paper for smoking.

Cigarettes may also refer to:

- "Cigarettes" (song), by Juice Wrld, 2022
- "Cigarettes", a song by Daniel Merriweather from Love & War (Daniel Merriweather album)
- "Cigarettes", a song by Reks from Rhythmatic Eternal King Supreme
- "Cigarettes", a song by Tash Sultana from Flow State

== See also ==
- Cigarette (disambiguation)
