= Merkanti Reef =

Artificial reef at St. Julian's, Malta

Coordinates: 35°55′29″N 14°29′50″E

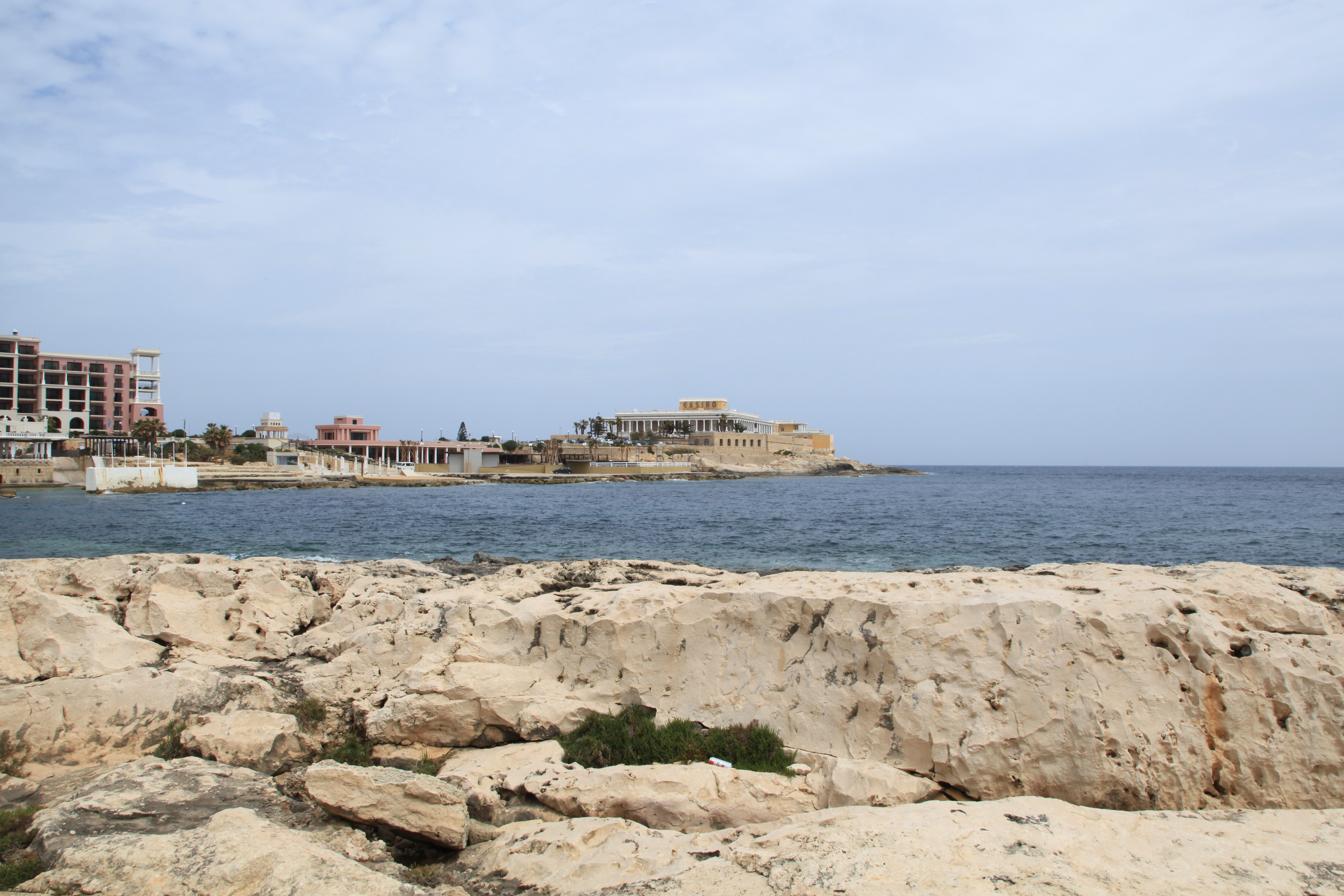
Merkanti Reef

Merkanti Reef, also known as Mercanti Reef, is a reef off the shore of St. Julian's, Malta. It is located between the shores of Dragonara Palace and the Hilton Resort in St Julian's.

== History ==
In the waters, huge concrete blocks were laid at the bottom of the sea to block sea waves. With this aid, over time, an artificial reef was formed, hosting a significant variety of marine biodiversity.

The reef leads to a sandy seabed between 15 and 20 metres off the shore. Water sports activity take place frequently, especially jet skies during the summer months and therefore divers are advised to use marker buoys.

On 29 July 1955, the passenger ferry MV Star of Malta ran aground on the reef and capsized, resulting in the deaths of one crew member and one passenger.

In 2005, a study by the Adi Associates revealed that the Merkanti Reef was the 26th most visited diving site in Malta. The Malta Environment and Planning Authority (MEPA) lists the reef under 'Protection of the Coast and the Marine Conservation Area' designated at level 3 area of ecological importance.
