= USS Scoter (SP-20) =

Armed motorboat of the United States Navy

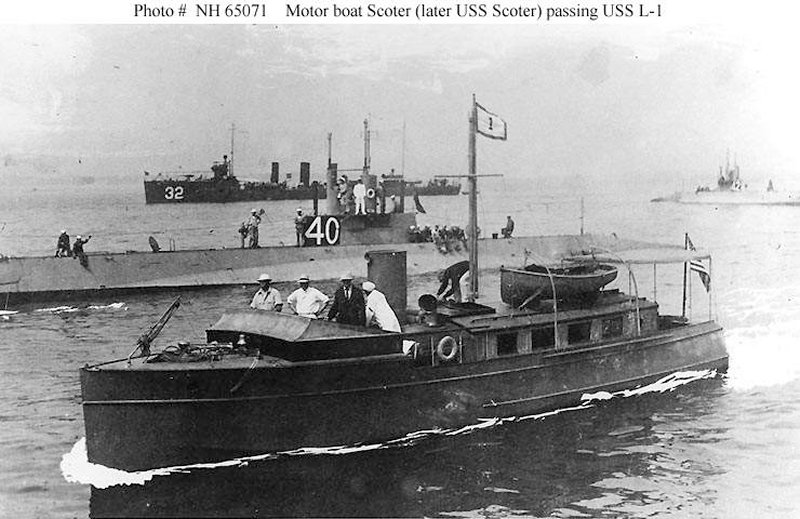
- Scoter as a private pleasure craft in 1916-1917, prior to her United States Navy service, passing the submarine USS L-1 (SS-40). The destroyer USS Monaghan (DD-32), left, and the submarine USS L-3 (SS-42), right, are in the background.

History

United States
- Name: USS Scoter
- Namesake: Previous name retained
- Builder: George Lawley & Son, Neponset, Massachusetts
- Completed: 1916
- Acquired: 21 April 1917
- Commissioned: 21 April 1917
- Stricken: 1919
- Fate: Unknown; probably disposed of in Europe 1919
- Notes: Operated as private motorboat Scoter 1916-1917; Originally mistakenly designated as both SP-20 and SP-53; "SP-53" designation later reassigned to USS Boy Scout (SP-53)

General characteristics
- Type: Patrol vessel
- Tonnage: 21 tons
- Length: 53 ft 3 in (16.23 m)
- Beam: 11 ft 6 in (3.51 m)
- Draft: 3 ft (0.91 m)
- Speed: 23 knots
- Armament: 1 × 1-pounder gun; 1 × .30-caliber (7.62-millimeter) machine gun

The first USS Scoter (SP-20), originally mistakenly designated both SP-20 and SP-53, was an armed motorboat that served in the United States Navy as a patrol vessel from 1917 until 1918 or 1919.

Scoter was built in 1916 by George Lawley & Son at Neponset, Massachusetts, as a private motorboat of the same name. She was enrolled in the Naval Coast Defense Reserve.

Her owner, J. L. Saltonstall of Boston, Massachusetts, delivered her to the U.S. Navy on 21 April 1917 for World War I service. She was commissioned as USS Scoter (SP-20) the same day. Originally, the Navy inadvertently gave her two designations, SP-20 and SP-53, but the designation SP-53 was later transferred to another patrol boat, USS Boy Scout (SP-53).

Assigned to duty with U.S. naval forces in Europe, Scoter was carried across the Atlantic Ocean on a larger ship. Records of her service after that are lacking; she probably operated in French waters into 1918. Unaccounted for, she was dropped from the Navy List in 1919; she probably was disposed of in Europe that year.
