= Puritan (yacht) =

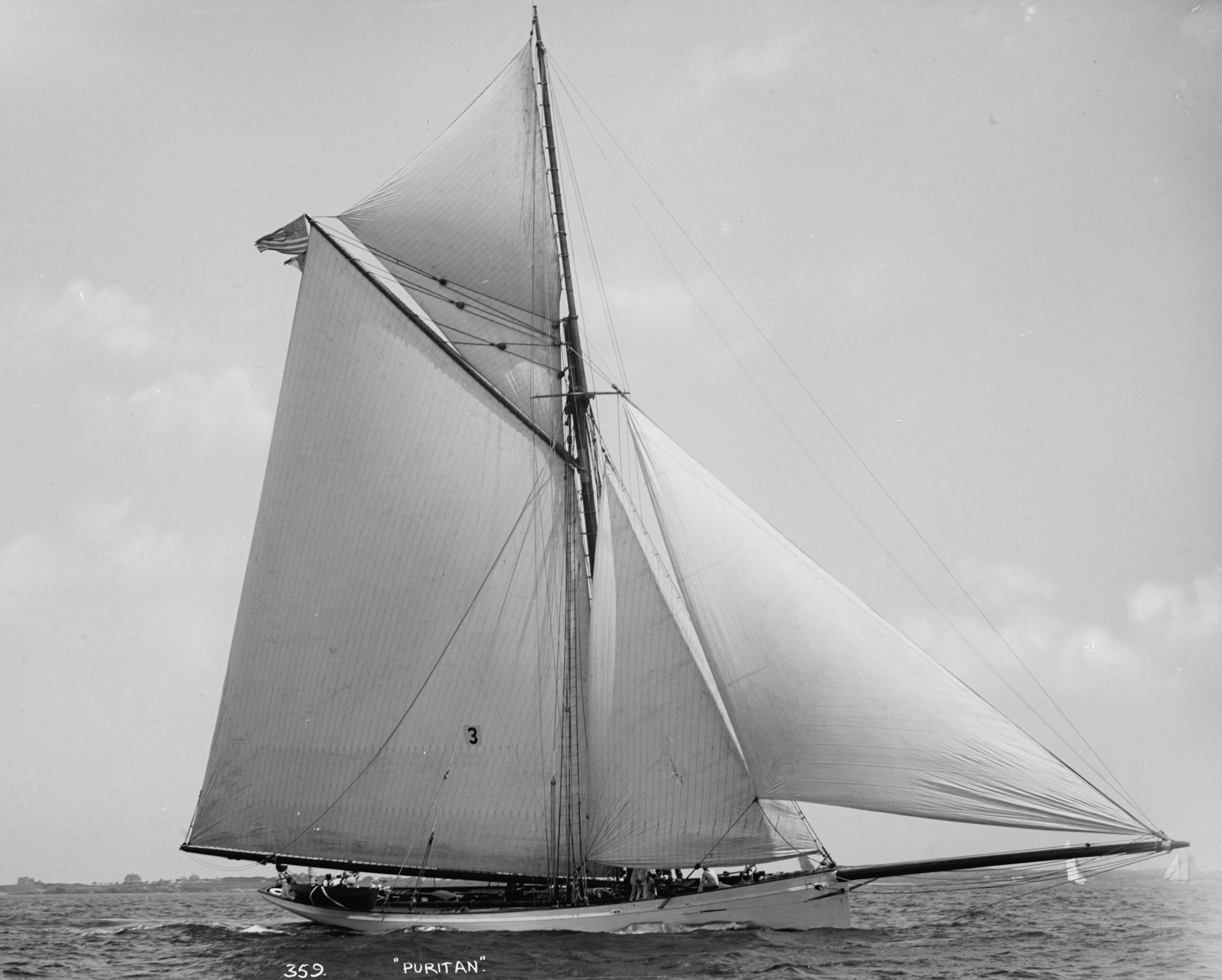
- The yacht Puritan, photographed by John S. Johnston.
- Yacht club: New York Yacht Club
- Nation: United States
- Builder: George Lawley & Son
- Launched: May 26, 1885
- Owner(s): John Malcolm Forbes

Racing career
- Skippers: Aubrey Crocker
- Notable victories: 1885 America's Cup
- America's Cup: 1885

Specifications
- Displacement: 105-tons Thames Measurement
- Length: 94 ft 0 in (28.65 m) (LOA); 81 ft 1.5 in (24.727 m) (LWL)
- Beam: 22 ft 7 in (6.88 m)
- Draft: 8 ft 8 in (2.64 m)
- Sail area: 7,982 sq ft (741.6 m^{2})

Puritan was a 19th-century racing yacht and the 1885 America's Cup defender of the international sailing trophy.

== Construction ==
Designed by Edward Burgess, she was built at the George Lawley & Son yard in South Boston, Massachusetts and launched May 26, 1885. For sails, Burgess chose the Irish-born sailmaker John H. McManus of McManus & Son, of Boston. The sails were of Plymouth duck.

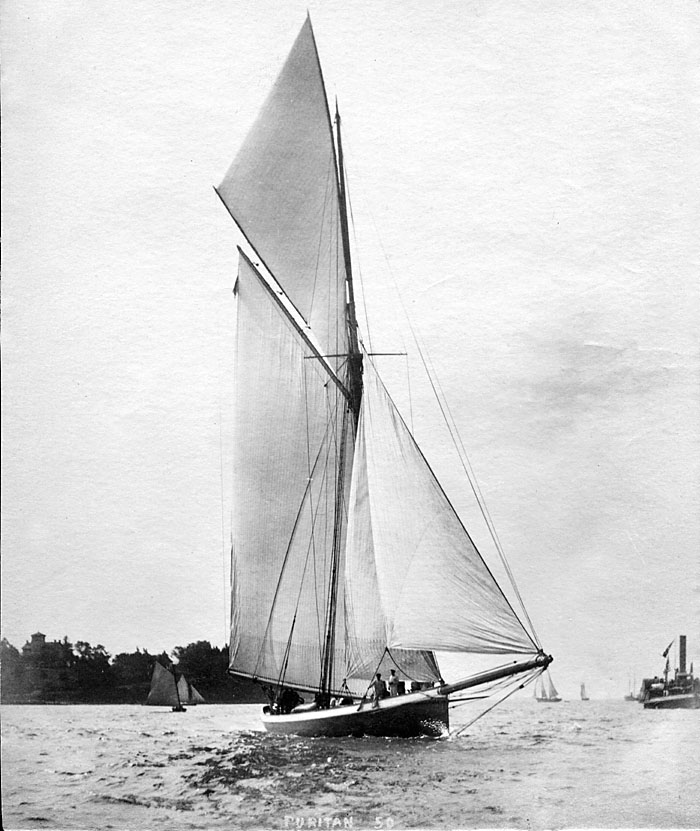
Puritan as photographed by John S. Johnston.

Puritan was an early combination of American and English designs with some of the depth of a cutter but beam and power of a sloop. It was owned by John Malcolm Forbes.

== America's Cup race ==
Captained by Aubrey Crocker, a well known yacht racer from Cohasset, Puritan defeated the New York Yacht Club's rival sloop Priscilla in trials on August 4, of 1885; the race was part of the Goelet Cup.

Despite this notable victory, the yacht's owner J. M. Forbes expressed his reservations about whether Puritan was better than Priscilla or the best boat to win the America's Cup offering that more tests were needed. Crocker did not have the same doubts about who would win in a rematch between Puritan and Priscilla. Crocker went on in September 1885 to successfully defend the America's Cup with Puritan against the British challenger Genesta, a traditional cutter.

Immediately following the contest, naval designers began work on an improved version of Puritan which would be called the Mayflower.

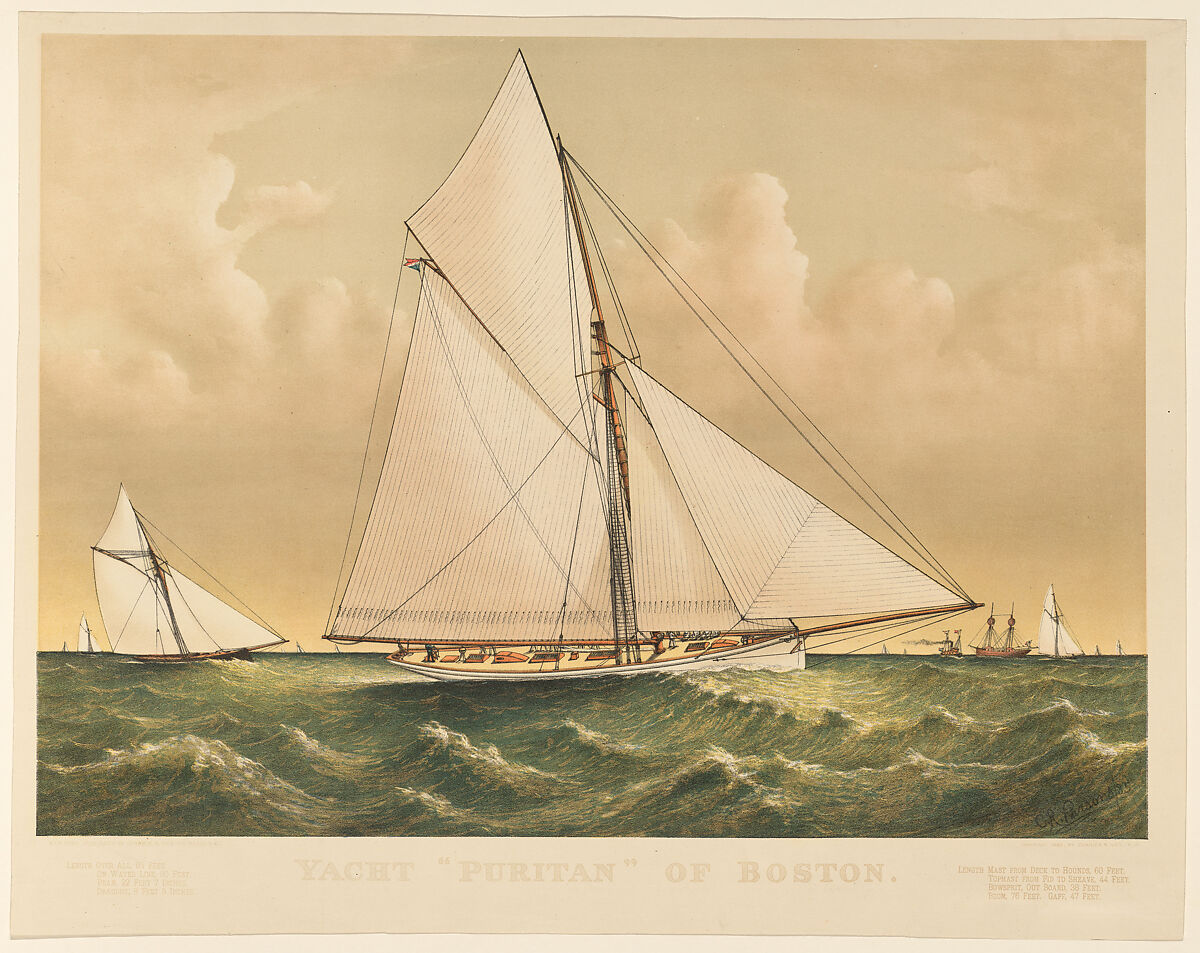
Print from 1885 published by the firm Currier & Ives and circulated as a souvenir after Puritan won the America's Cup.
