= USS Hiawatha (ID-2892) =

Tugboat of the United States Navy

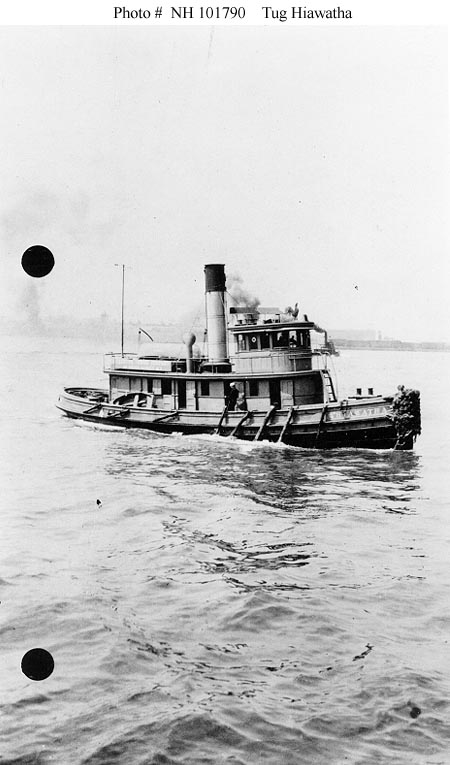
- Hiawatha as a civilian tug, probably sometime between 1903 and 1917.

History

United States
- Name: USS Hiawatha
- Namesake: Hiawatha, a leader of the Onondaga and Mohawk nations of Native Americans and a fictional character in Henry Wadsworth Longfellow's 1855 poem The Song of Hiawatha
- Builder: Brown, Tottenville, Staten Island, New York
- Completed: 1903
- Acquired: 1 August 1918
- Commissioned: 1 August 1918
- Decommissioned: 5 December 1918
- Fate: Returned to owner 30 April 1919 or 5 May 1919
- Notes: Operated as civilian tug Hiawatha 1903-1918 and from 1919

General characteristics
- Type: Harbor tug
- Displacement: 69 tons
- Length: 65 ft 5 in (19.94 m)
- Beam: 17 ft (5.2 m)
- Draft: 8 ft (2.4 m)
- Installed power: 250 indicated horsepower (0.33 megawatt)
- Propulsion: Steam engine, one shaft
- Speed: 8 knots
- Complement: 5

The second USS Hiawatha (ID-2892 or SP-2892) was a harbor tug that served in the United States Navy in 1918.

Hiawatha was built as a civilian, wooden-hulled steam tug of the same name in 1903 by Brown at Tottenville, Staten Island, New York. The U.S. Navy acquired her under charter from her owner for World War I service on 1 August 1918. She was commissioned as USS Hiawatha (ID-2892 or SP-2892) at New York City the same day.

Assigned to the 3rd Naval District, Hiawatha operated with the guard ship USS Amphitrite and was manned either by sailors from Amphitrite or by a civilian crew. She performed guard duty in the New York Harbor and boarded ships to inspect cargo until she was decommissioned on 5 December 1918.

Hiawatha was returned to her owner on either 30 April 1919 or 5 May 1919.

Throughout her U.S. Navy service, Hiawatha was one of two ships simultaneously in service as USS Hiawatha, the other being the patrol vessel USS Hiawatha (SP-183).
