= Mayflower (yacht) =

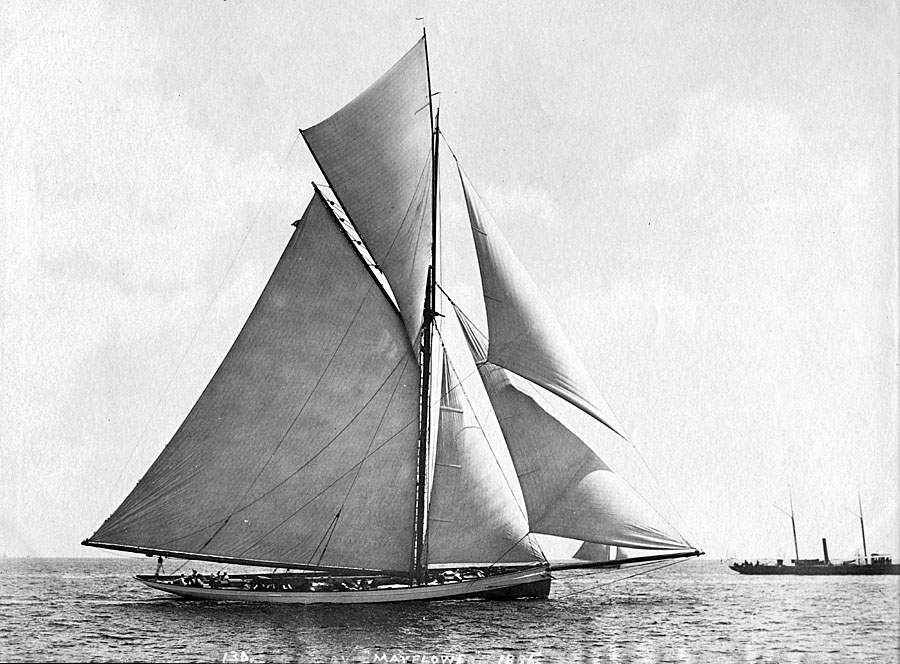
- Mayflower
- Yacht club: New York Yacht Club
- Nation: USA
- Designer(s): Edward Burgess
- Builder: George Lawley & Son
- Launched: 1886
- Owner(s): Charles Jackson Paine

Racing career
- Skippers: Martin V.B. Stone
- Notable victories: 1886 defender trials; 1886 America's Cup
- America's Cup: 1886

Specifications
- Displacement: 110 tons
- Length: 30.55 m (100.2 ft) (LOA); 26.06 m (85.5 ft) (LWL)
- Beam: 7.19 m (23.6 ft)
- Draft: 3.00 m (9.84 ft)(centerboard up); 6.10 m (20.0 ft)(centerboard down)
- Sail area: 774 m^{2} (8,330 sq ft)

Mayflower was the victorious U.S. defender of the sixth America's Cup in 1886 against Scottish challenger Galatea.

== Design ==
The sloop Mayflower was the second America's Cup defender designed by Edward "Ned" Burgess, built by George Lawley & Son and launched in 1886 for owner General Charles J. Paine of Boston. It was built entirely of wood: oak and hard pine. She was skippered by Martin V. B. Stone. Her sails were made by John H. McManus of McManus & Son.

== Career ==
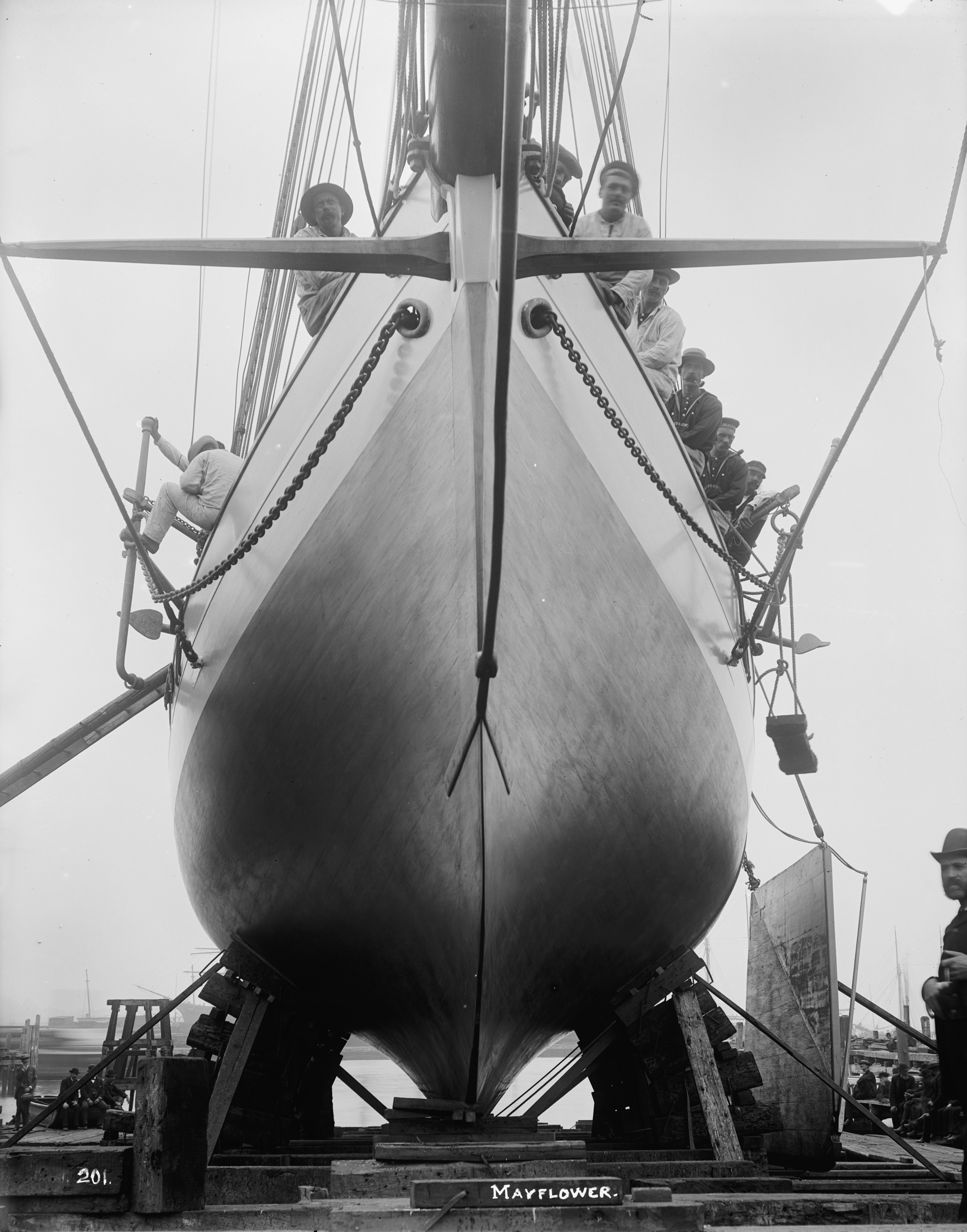
Mayflower

In the trials, Mayflower defeated the yachts Puritan (Burgess' first victorious Cup defender), Priscilla, and Atlantic, and was subsequently selected to defend the 1886 Cup.

By 1889 the Mayflower was purchased by F. Townsend Underhill, who had it altered to become a schooner. In 1905 Lady Eva Barker bought the vessel and outfitted it with an engine. She chartered it to adventurer Guy Hamilton Scull in 1908 on an expedition seeking the treasure of a sunk Spanish galleon off Jamaica. The Mayflower was sunk itself off Cuba in a hurricane during this expedition, and the crew was rescued by passing steamers.
