= Neponset, Boston =

District of Boston, Massachusetts, US

Coordinates: 42°17′10″N 71°02′43″W

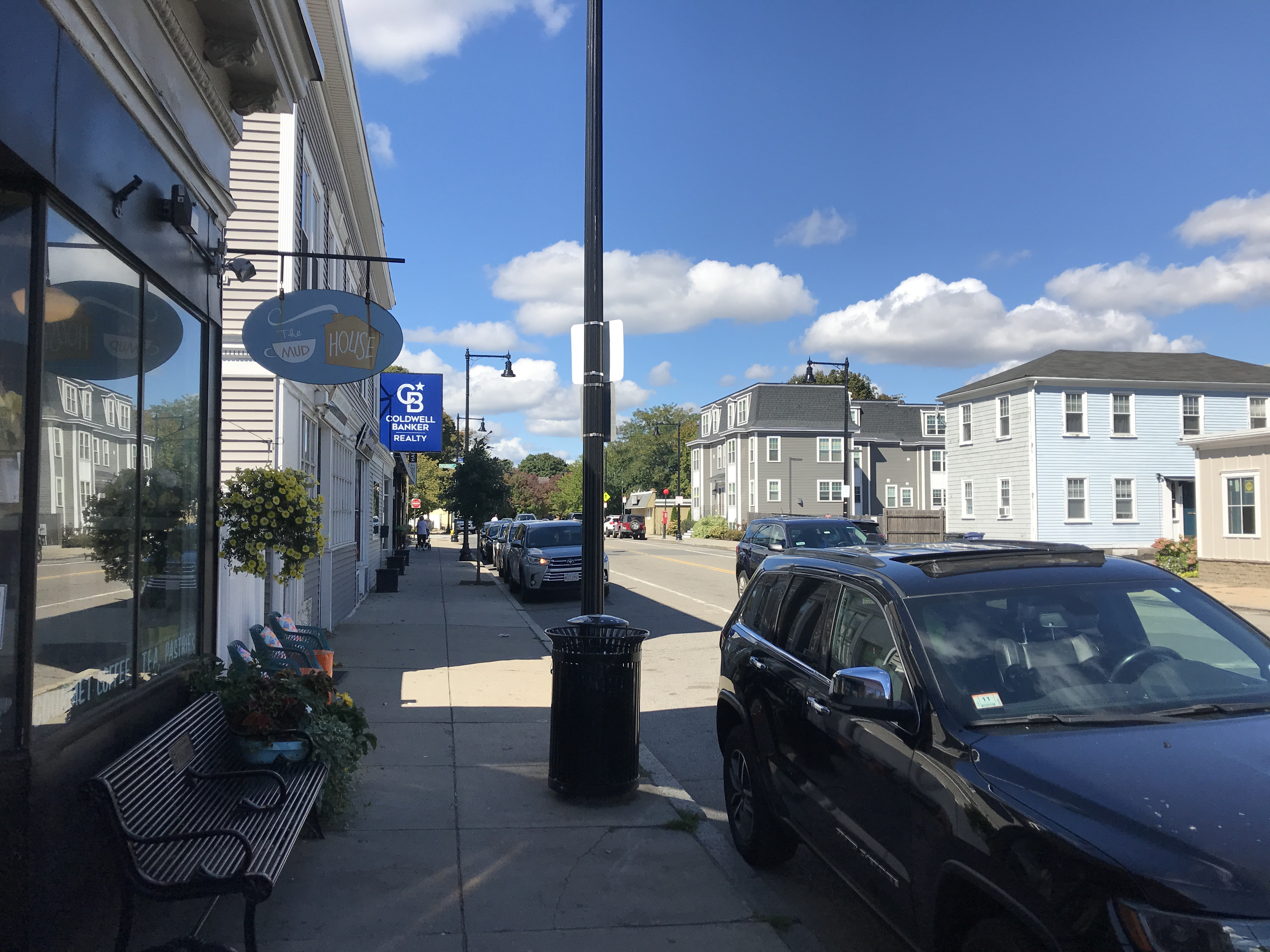
Neponset Avenue

Neponset is a district in the southeastern corner of Dorchester, Boston, Massachusetts, United States. The Neponset Indians were the original inhabitants of this district and in 1646 John Eliot preached unsuccessfully to the Native American community in Lower Mills (Dorchester) led by Sachem Cutshamekin before the tribe moved to Ponkapoag.
