= 1924–25 New Zealand rugby union tour of Britain, Ireland and France =

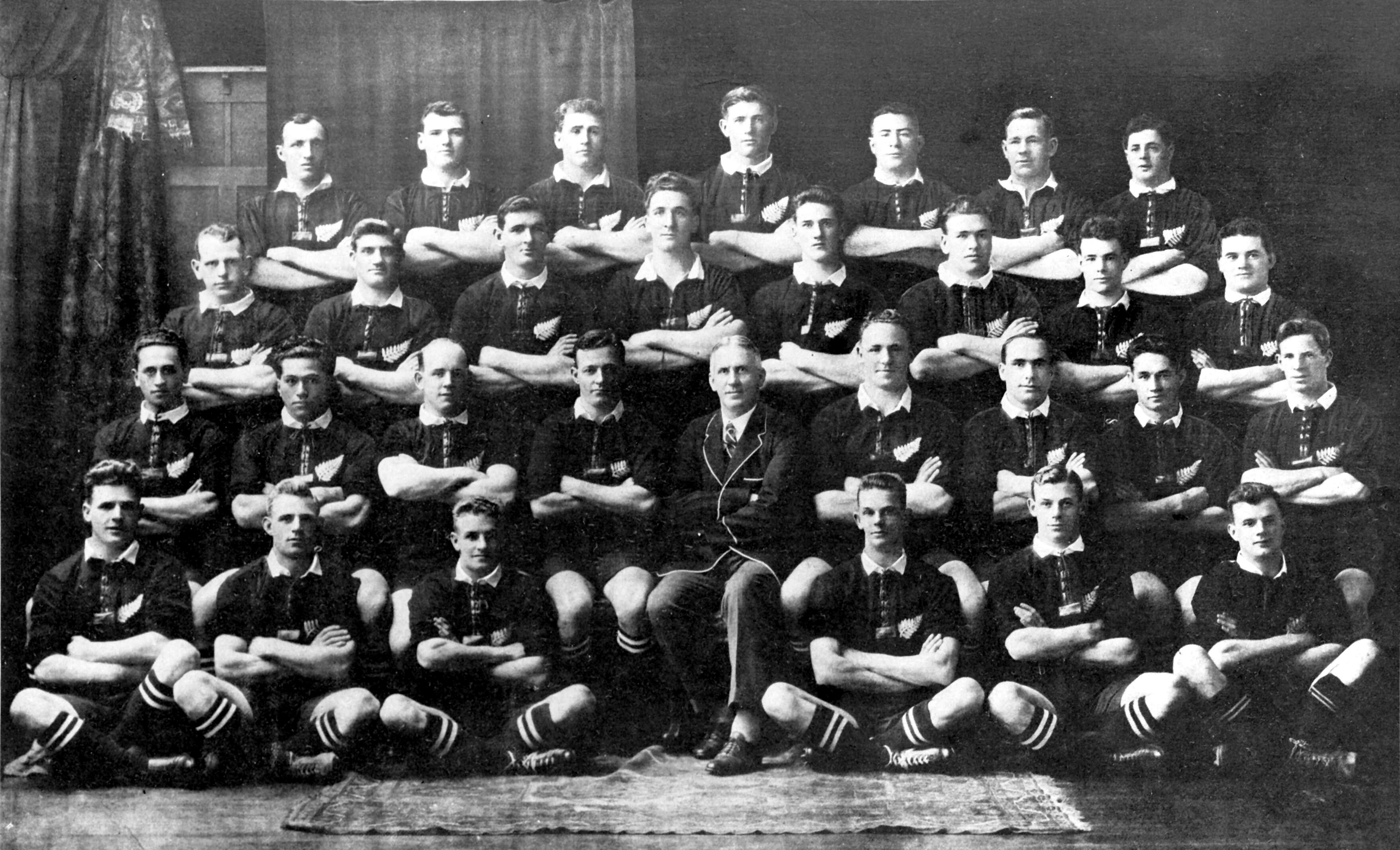
- The Invincibles, as they were nicknamed after winning all 32 of their games overseas
- Manager: S.S. Dean
- Tour captain: Cliff Porter
- Top point scorer: Mark Nicholls (131)
- Top try scorer: Bert Cooke (28)
Summary
P	W	D	L
Total
32	32	0	0
Test match
4	4	0	0
Opponent
P	W	D	L
Ireland
1	1	0	0
Wales
1	1	0	0
England
1	1	0	0
France
1	1	0	0

Tour chronology
- ← 1924 NS Wales 1925 NS Wales →

The Invincibles was a nickname given to the 1924–25 New Zealand national team which toured the United Kingdom, Ireland, France and Canada. The team was captained by Cliff Porter, and numbered among its top players George Nēpia and brothers Cyril and Maurice Brownlie. During the test against England Cyril Brownlie was sent off by the Welsh referee Albert Freethy, the first player to be sent off from a test.

Between September 1924 and February 1925, the team played 32 games including four test matches, one each against Ireland, England, Wales, and France. They won all 32 games, scoring 838 points and only having 116 points scored against them.

Cliff Porter was tour captain, but played only 17 of the 32 games due to injury, including just one test (against France). During the remaining games, tour vice-captain Johnstone Richardson (Jock) took over the captaincy.

== Touring party ==
=== Management ===
- Manager: Stanley Dean (Wellington)
- Captain: Cliff Porter

=== Full-backs ===
- George Nēpia (Hawke's Bay)

=== Three-quarters ===
- Handley Brown (Taranaki)
- Gus Hart (Taranaki)
- Fred Lucas (Auckland)
- Alan Robilliard (Canterbury)
- Snowy Svenson (Wellington)
- Jack Steel (West Coast)

=== Five-eighths ===
- Ces Badeley (Auckland)
- Bert Cooke (Auckland)
- Neil McGregor (Canterbury)
- Mark Nicholls (Wellington)
- Lui Paewai (Hawke's Bay)

=== Half-backs ===
- Bill Dalley (Canterbury)
- Jimmy Mill (Hawke's Bay)

=== Wing forwards ===
- Jim Parker (Canterbury)
- Cliff Porter (Wellington)

=== Forwards ===
- Cyril Brownlie (Hawke's Bay)
- Maurice Brownlie (Hawke's Bay)
- Les Cupples (Bay of Plenty)
- Quentin Donald (Wairarapa)
- Ian Harvey (Wairarapa)
- Bull Irvine (Hawke's Bay)
- Read Masters (Canterbury)
- Brian McCleary (Canterbury)
- Abe Munro (Otago)
- Jock Richardson (Southland)
- Ron Stewart (South Canterbury)
- Alf West (Taranaki)
- Andrew White (Southland)

== Match summary ==
Complete list of matches played by the All Blacks in the British Isles, France and Canada: Test matches

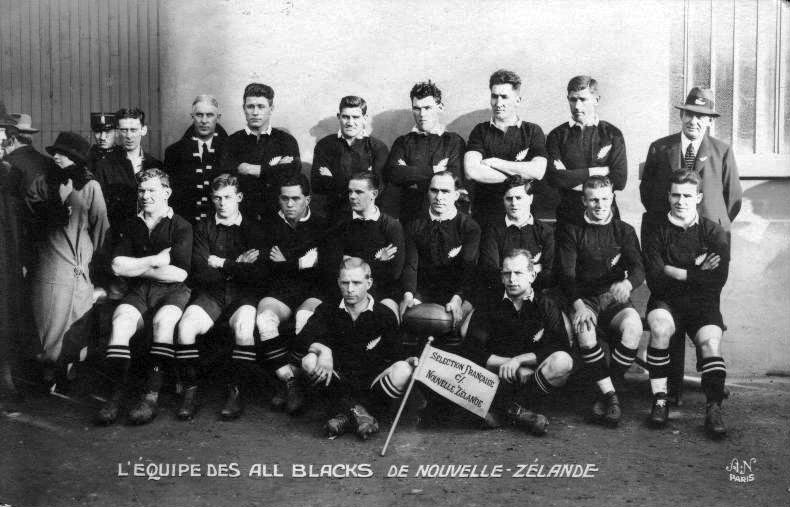
Team that played France on January 18

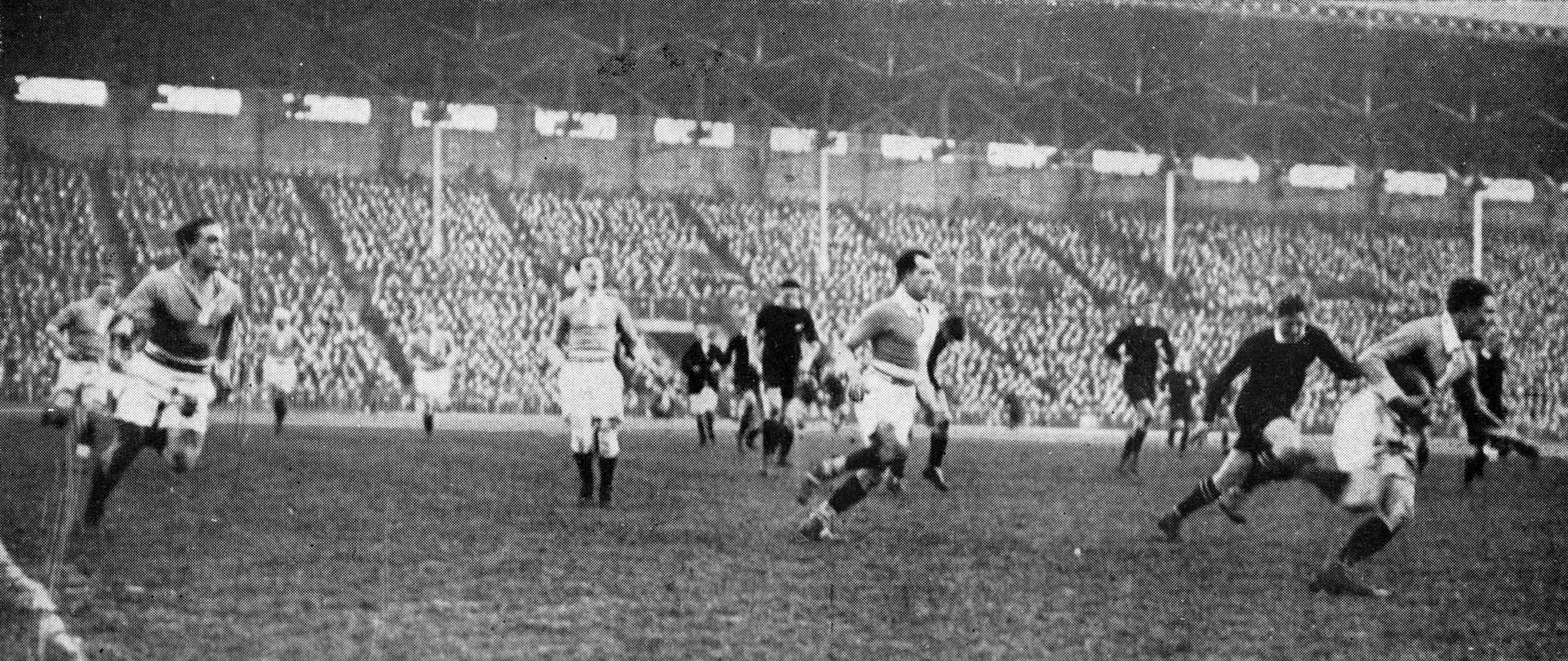
Scene of the match v France in Paris

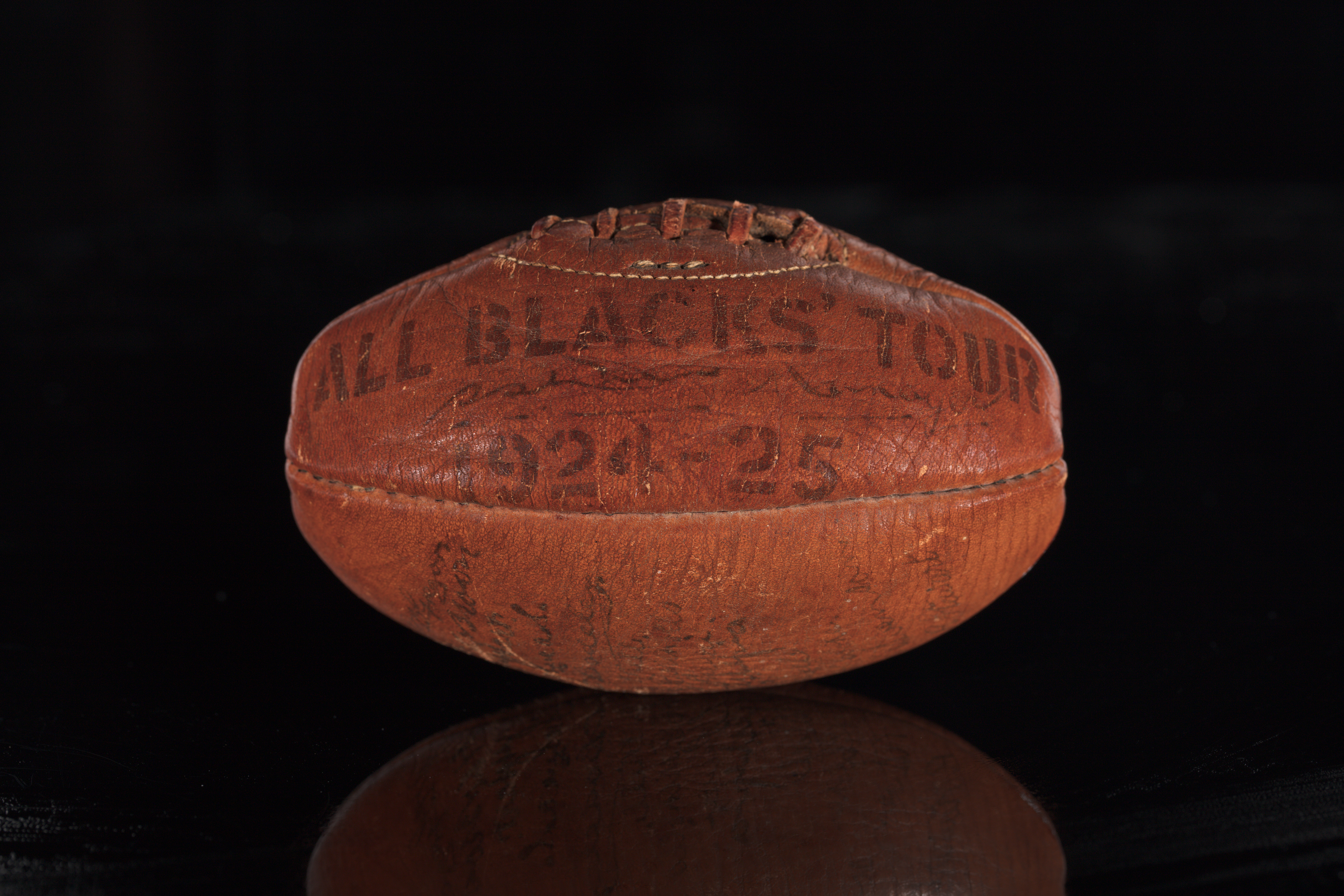
Miniature rugby ball presented to Fred Lucas signed by the entire team

#	Date	Rival	City	Venue	Score
1	13 Sep 1924	Devonshire RU	Devonport	Rectory Ground	11–0
2	18 Sep	Cornwall RU	Camborne	Recreation Ground	29–0
3	20 Sep	Somersetshire RU	Weston-super-Mare	Weston Ground	6–0
4	25 Sep	Gloucestershire RU	Gloucester	Kingsholm Stadium	6–0
5	27 Sep	Swansea RFC	Swansea	St Helens Ground	39–3
6	2 Oct	Newport RFC	Newport	Athletic Ground	13–10
7	4 Oct	Leicester Tigers	Leicester	Welford Road Stadium	27–0
8	8 Oct	North Midlands RU	Birmingham	Villa Park	40–3
9	11 Oct	Cheshire RU	Birkenhead	Birkenhead Park	18–5
10	15 Oct	Durham	Sunderland	Roker Park	43–7
11	18 Oct	Yorkshire RU	Bradford	Lidget Green	42–4
12	22 Oct	Lancashire RU	Manchester	Old Trafford	23–0
13	25 Oct	Cumberland	Carlisle	Brunton Park	41–0
14	1 Nov	Ireland	Dublin	Lansdowne Road	6–0
15	5 Nov	Ulster Rugby	Belfast	Ravenhill Stadium	28–6
16	8 Nov	Northumberland RU	Gosforth		27–4
17	12 Nov	Cambridge University	Grange Road		5–0
18	15 Nov	London Counties	London	Twickenham Stadium	31–6
19	20 Nov	Oxford University	Oxford	Iffley Road	33–15
20	22 Nov	Cardiff RFC	Cardiff	National Stadium	16–8
21	29 Nov	Wales	Swansea	St Helens Ground	19–0
22	2 Dec	Llanelli RFC	Llanelli	Stradey Park	8–3
23	6 Dec	East Midlands	Northampton	Cricket Ground	31–7
24	11 Dec	Warwickshire RU	Highfield Road		20–0
25	13 Dec	Combined Services	London	Twickenham Stadium	25–3
26	17 Dec	Hampshire RU	Portsmouth	Fratton Park	22–0
27	27 Dec	London Counties	London	Rectory Field	28–3
28	3 Jan 1925	England	London	Twickenham Stadium	17–11
29	11 Jan	Selection Francais	Colombes	Stade Olympique	37–8
30	18 Jan	France	Toulouse	Stade des Ponts Jumeaux	30–6
31	14 Feb	Vancouver	Vancouver	Cricket Oval	49–0
32	18 Feb	Victoria	Vancouver Island	Victoria Ground	68–4

== The test matches ==
=== Ireland ===
1 November 1924

Ireland	0–6	New Zealand
		Try: Snowy Svenson; Pen: Nicholls

Lansdowne Road
Attendance: 25,000
Referee: A.E. Freethy (Wales)

Ireland: 15.Ernie Crawford, 14.Henry Stephenson, 13.George Stephenson, 12.James Gardiner, 11.Tom Hewitt, 10.Frank Hewitt, 9.John McDowell, 8.James Clinch, 7.Robert Crichton, 6.Norman Brand, 5.William Collis, 4.Alex Spain, 3.Dick Collopy, 2.Thomas McClelland, 1.Jim McVicker
New Zealand: 15.George Nēpia, 14.Snowy Svenson, 13.Frederick Lucas, 12.Bert Cooke, 11.Augustine Hart, 10.Mark Nicholls, 9.Bill Dalley, 8.Les Cupples, 7.Son White, 6.Jock Richardson (c), 5.Read Masters, 4.Maurice Brownlie, 3.Bull Irvine, 2.Quentin Donald, 1.James Parker

=== Wales ===
29 November 1924

Wales	0–19	New Zealand
		Try: Irvine (2); M Brownlie; Svenson; Con: Nicholls; Pen: Nicholls

St Helens
Attendance: 50,000
Referee: Col. J.S. Brunton (England)

Wales: Tom Johnson (Cardiff), Ernie Finch (Llanelli), Albert Jenkins (Llanelli), Albert Stock (Newport), Rowe Harding (Swansea), Jack Wetter (Newport) capt., Eddie Williams (Neath), Bobby Delahay (Cardiff), Dai Parker (Swansea), Jack Gore, (Blaina), Charlie Pugh (Maesteg), Steve Morris (Cross Keys), Cliff Williams (Llanelli), Douglas Marsden-Jones (London Welsh), Dai Hiddlestone (Neath)
New Zealand: G Nēpia, J Steel, AE Cooke, KS Svenson, NP McGregor, MF Nicholls, J Mill, JH Parker, WR Irvine, Q Donald, RR Masters, LF Cupples, CJ Brownlie, MJ Brownlie, J Richardson (capt.)

=== England ===
3 January 1925

England	11–17	New Zealand
Try: Cove-Smith, Kittermaster; Con: Conway; Pen: Corbett		Try: Steel, Svenson; MJ Brownlie, Parker, Con: Nicholls; Pen: Nicholls

Twickenham Stadium, London
Attendance: 60,000
Referee: Albert Freethy (Wales)

England:15.Jim Brough, 14.Richard Hamilton-Wickes, 13.Vivian Davies, 12.Leonard Corbett, 11.Cliff Gibbs, 10.Harold Kittermaster, 9.Arthur Young, 8.Tom Voyce, 7.Geoffrey Conway, 6.Freddie Blakiston, 5.Ron Cove-Smith, 4.Wavell Wakefield (cap.), 3.Ronald Hillard, 2.Sam Tucker, 1.Reg Edwards
New Zealand:15.George Nēpia, 14.John Steel, 13.Bert Cooke, 12.Mark Nicholls, 11.Snowy Svenson, 10.Neil McGregor, 9.Jimmy Mill, 8.Jock Richardson (cap.), 7.Son White, 6.Cyril Brownlie (red card) , 5.Read Masters, 4.Maurice Brownlie, 3.Bull Irvine, 2.Quentin Donald, 1.James Parker,

=== France ===
18 January 1925

France	6–30	New Zealand
Try: Cassayeet; Ribere		Try: Cooke (2), Irivine, Porter, Richardson, Steel, Svenson, White; Con: Nicholls (3)

Stade des Ponts Jumeaux, Toulouse
Attendance: 30,000
Referee: H.E.B. Wilkins (England)

Team details

France	New Zealand

France: 15.Chilo, 14.Jauregui, 13.Ballette, 12.Ballarin, 11.Hallet, 10.du Manoir, 9.Piteu, 8.Boubee, 7.Ribere, 6.Bioussa, 5.Cassayeet (capt), 4.Laurent, 3.Maury, 2.Marcet, 1.Montade
New Zealand: 15.George Nēpia, 14.John Steel, 13.Frederick Lucas, 12.Bert Cooke, 11.Snowy Svenson, 10.Mark Nicholls, 9.Jimmy Mill, 8.Cliff Porter (capt), 7.Son White, 6.Jock Richardson, 5.Cyril Brownlie, 4., 3.Maurice Brownlie, 2.Quentin Donald, 1.Bull Irvine

== Bibliography ==
- Chester, R., Palenski, R., and McMillan, N. (1998) The Encyclopedia of New Zealand Rugby. Auckland: Hodder Moa Beckett.
