= Jim Parker (rugby union) =

Jim Parker CBE MM
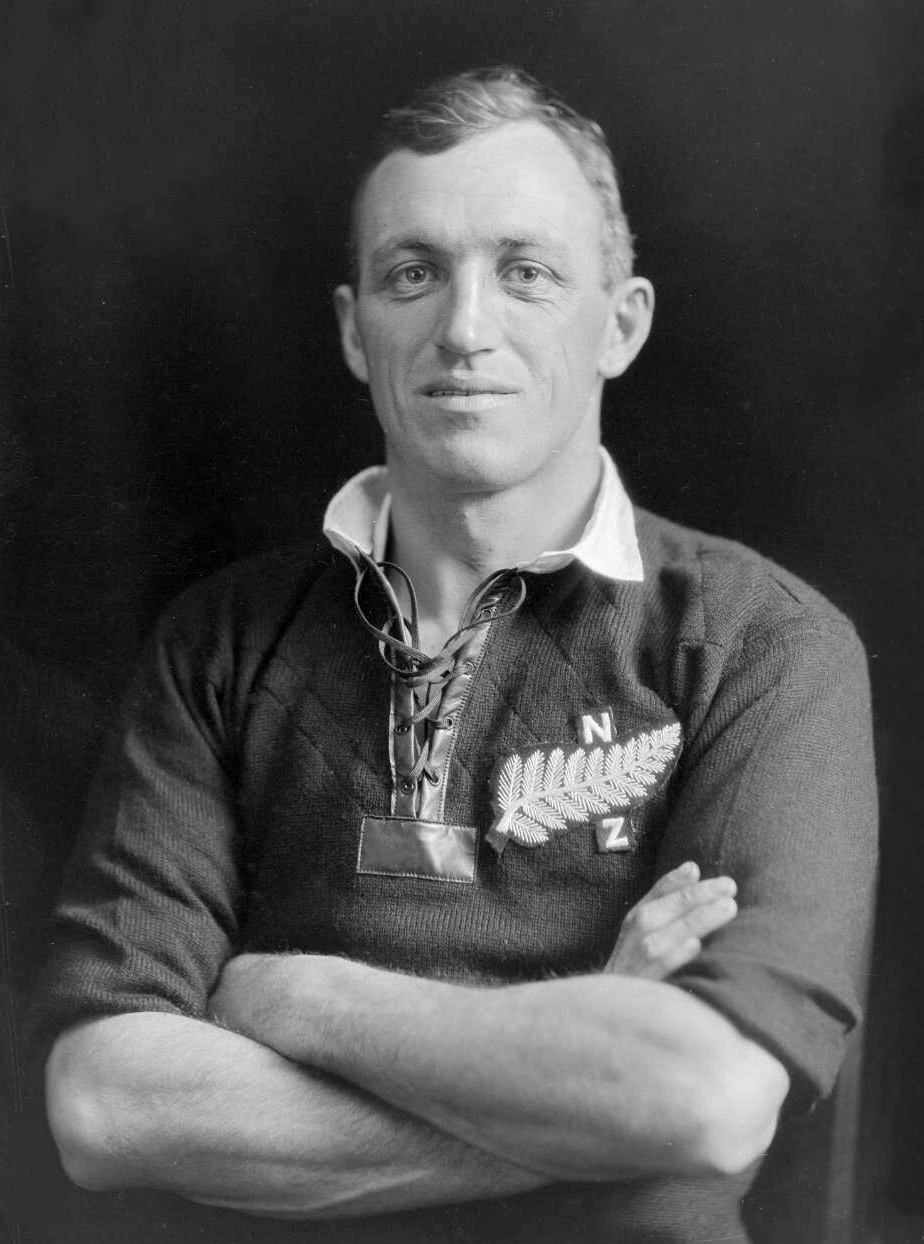
- Parker in 1924
- Born: James Hislop Parker; 1 February 1897 Lyttelton, New Zealand
- Died: 11 September 1980 (aged 83) Auckland, New Zealand
- Height: 1.83 m (6 ft 0 in)
- Weight: 79 kg (174 lb)
- School: Christchurch Boys' High School
- Occupation: Orchardist

Rugby union career
- Position: Wing-forward
Provincial / State sides
Years	Team	Apps	(Points)
1920, 1923–24	Canterbury		
International career
Years	Team	Apps	(Points)
1924–25	New Zealand	3	(3)

James Hislop Parker CBE MM (1 February 1897 – 11 September 1980) was a New Zealand soldier, sportsman and businessman. He achieved distinction as a sprinter before representing his country at rugby union, including as a member of so-called "Invincibles" team of 1924–25. He was a decorated World War I veteran, and had a business career that included service as chairman of the New Zealand Apple and Pear Marketing Board.

== Early life and family ==
Parker was born in Lyttelton on 1 February 1897. He was the son of Nimrod Parker (1866–1930) and Jane Kerr Hislop (1871–1954), and the grandson of Joseph Parker (1842–1918) who, in 1859, had left Welburn, Yorkshire, initially for the Victorian goldfields, and then for those in Otago, New Zealand.

On 21 June 1924, Parker married Elizabeth Mary Westropp Twemlow (1900–1969) at St Andrew's Church, Christchurch, with Read Masters performing the duties as best man. The couple went on to have one son, Jimmy Frederick Parker (1935–1995).

== War service ==
During World War I, Parker served with the ANZAC Mounted Division in the Palestine Campaign.

In August 1916, Parker joined the New Zealand Expeditionary Force and, in January 1917, sailed to Suez, Egypt on the Waihora. A diary he kept during this period gives accounts of the fighting, raids by Taube monoplanes, sports and social activity. In January 1918, Parker was with the New Zealand Mounted Machinegun Squadron at Ashdod, Palestine.

By 23 March 1918, Parker's squadron began to engage Turkish Forces in the Jordan Valley. He wrote in his diary:

We went across the Jordan with the Auckland Reg[iment] and chased the Turks at a gallop… we got several guns and about 100 prisoners.

— Parker, A Soldier's Diary, pp. 5–6

On 29 March 1918, the squadron was at Amman and Parker wrote, “our section in trouble”. He then detailed several casualties amongst his comrades and that a Turkish shell had landed amongst the New Zealand horses, killing ten and wounding four. The following day, Parker wrote:

Moved out at 1.30am with only pack horses… Turks got onto us on the left flank at daylight… Woods and I had to dismount our gun and I got on to the Turks at 300 yards as they were starting for a counter attack. Gordon Woods was killed next to me by a bullet in head. Soon after shell hit right under parapet and buried three of us. This was the most hellish day of my life… the Turks came at us and we drove them off twice. They shelled us for hours and men were going out wounded in a stream.

— Parker, A Soldier's Diary, pp. 5–6.

Parker was one of the many troopers who contracted malaria. He was in Cairo when the war ended. He recorded the occasion in his diary:

Nov 11 Mon. Germany signed the armistice… Great rejoicing in camp. All Beer Canteens raided and every canteen and Gyppo shop in the place was raided and most of them were then burnt.

— Parker, A Soldier's Diary, p. 16

Awarded the Military Medal for bravery in the field, Parker returned to New Zealand on the transport HMT Ulimaroa and was discharged in August 1919.

== Sporting career ==
=== Athletics ===
Parker was trained by his father, Nimrod Parker, who had been regarded as one of the best all round athletes in New Zealand. Jim Parker became the 1919–20 Canterbury amateur champion in the 100 yard and 220 yard sprints, and then as a professional, held the New Zealand record for the 75 yard sprint. The Wellington centre of the New Zealand Amateur Athletic Association supported Parker's reinstatement as an amateur in 1931.

=== Rugby union ===
==== Player ====
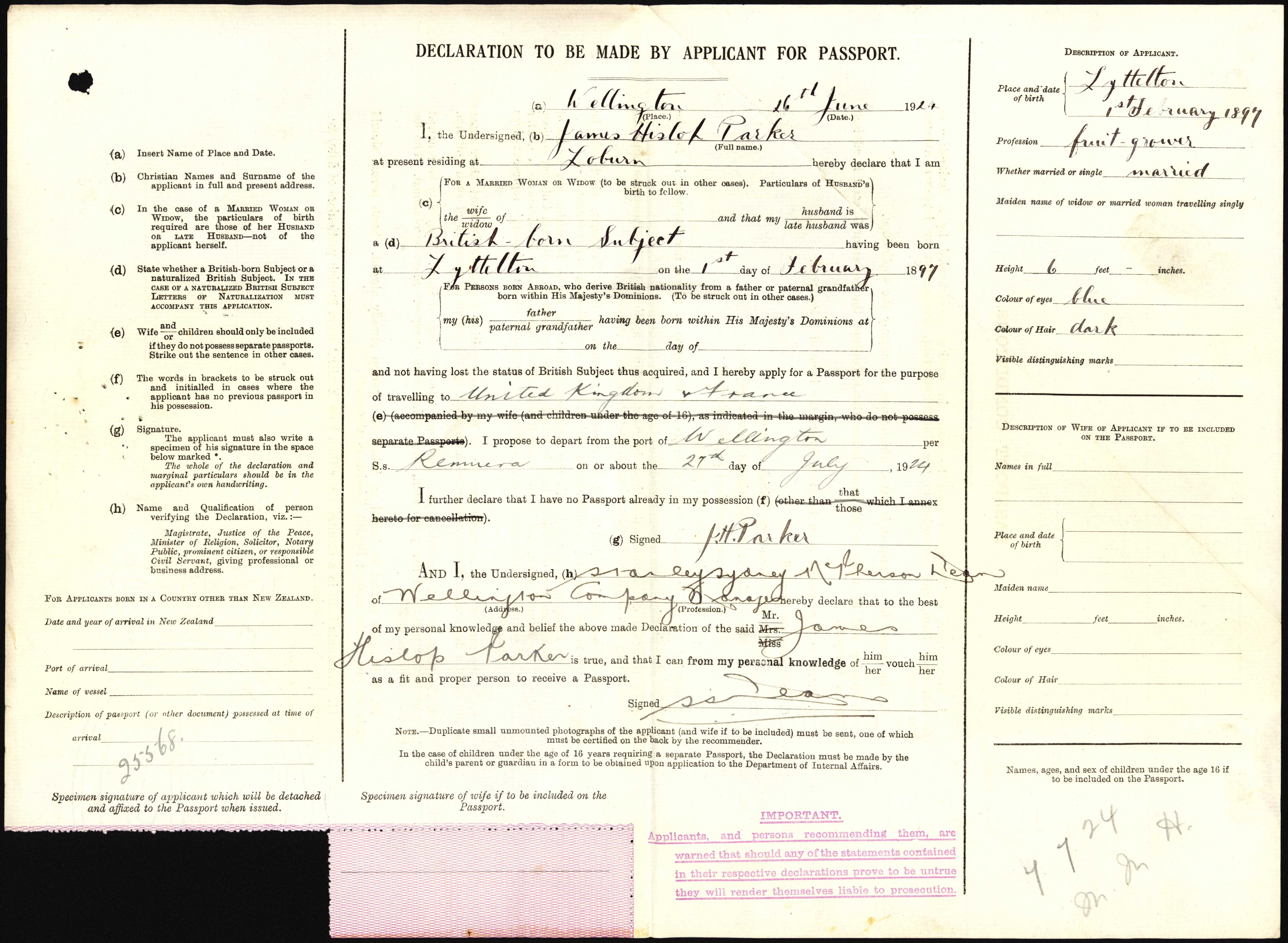
James Hislop Parker passport application (1924)

Educated at Christchurch Boys' High School, Parker played rugby union there, and during 1915 and 1916 he was a member of the Christchurch Old Boys club. During his war service in the Middle East, he played for the New Zealand Machinegun Squadron team, which also included players such as Jock Richardson, and Cyril and Maurice Brownlie. Following the war, he first represented the Canterbury provincial team in 1920, playing both as a loose forward and wing three-quarter.

Owing to work pressures and the malaria that he had contracted during the war, Parker did not appear for Canterbury again until the 1923 season, when he played in six matches. The following year he played in the All Black trials and in the inter-island match for the South Island, and he made his debut for the national team on the short tour of New South Wales.

Parker was then selected for the All Blacks' 1924–25 tour of Britain, Ireland, France and Canada. On that tour Parker, playing as a wing-forward, appeared in 18 matches including three internationals. His skills were compared by critics with those of George Gillett from the early 1900s: "Parker was the Gillett type—a born rover, like lightning off the mark, with good hands, and a genius for flashing into an opening." Team captain and one of the selectors, Cliff Porter, was later praised for his sportsmanship in standing himself down in favour of Parker during test matches: "Parker's remarkable speed ... allowed him to appear more in the role of a stand-off half and at the same time carry on with his winging game."

==== Coach and administrator ====
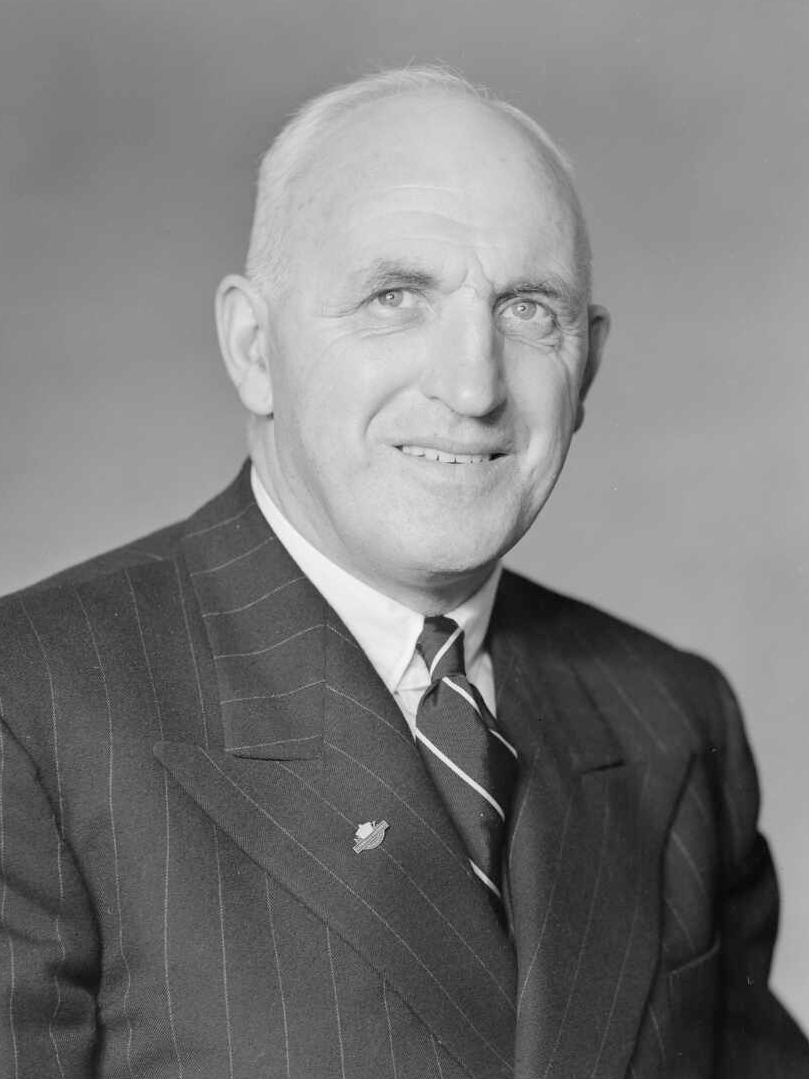
Parker as All Blacks manager in 1949

Back in New Zealand in 1925, recurring bouts of malaria and ongoing work commitments curtailed Parker's playing career, and he retired after a few club matches that season. However, he continued in a coaching role and was credited at the end of the 1939 season for much of the improvement shown by the Victoria College Football Club in Wellington.

Parker was a member of the executive committee of the New Zealand Rugby Union from 1939 to 1956, and was the All Blacks' manager on their controversial tour of South Africa in 1949. New Zealand acquiesced to the apartheid policies of South Africa and sent a European-only team. Parker would have been aware that his former teammate, George Nēpia, had already experienced South Africa's racism and had drifted off to play rugby league. As a silent protest, the All Blacks did not perform the tradition pre-game haka. Parker stated that, "the war cry is a creation of the Maoris and as we have no Maoris with us we are not giving the war cry."

In 1959 Parker was elected a life member of the New Zealand Rugby Football Union.

== Orchard and business career ==
Parker had an orchard of 6 ha (15 acres), mainly of apples but with some peaches and nectarines, at Loburn in North Canterbury, but left the area in 1929. He became the Nelson manager of the New Zealand Fruitgrowers' Federation (NZFF), and moved to Wellington in 1934 when he was appointed assistant manager at the NZFF head office. By 1945 he was the NZFF general manager.

In 1955, Parker was appointed chairman of the New Zealand Apple and Pear Marketing Board, and served in that capacity until about 1964. In the 1964 Queen's Birthday Honours, he was appointed a Commander of the Order of the British Empire for services to the fruit industry.
