= Jack Parr (rugby union) =

Irish rugby union player

Jack Parr MC
- Full name: Sidney John Parr
- Born: 21 August 1889 Athboy, County Meath, Ireland
- Died: 28 February 1960 (aged 70) Athboy, County Meath, Ireland

Rugby union career
- Position: Wing-forward
International career
Years	Team	Apps	(Points)
1914	Ireland	4	(0)

Sidney John Parr (21 August 1889 – 28 February 1960) was an Irish international rugby union player.

A native of Athboy, County Meath, Parr was a son of noted horse breeder Bernard Wauhope Parr.

Parr, a wing-forward, played his rugby for Wanderers and was capped four times for Ireland. He made all of his appearances in the 1914 Five Nations Championship, featuring in wins over France and Scotland.

During World War I, Parr served as an officer in the Royal Dragoons and received the Military Cross for demonstrating "distinguished service" at Loos.

Parr married the sister of Irish rugby players George and Henry Stephenson.

As owner of a Mitchelstown stud farm, Parr bred the 1954 Irish 2,000 Guineas–winning horse Artic Wind. Another of his horses, Mared, was the dam of Red Rum.

== See also ==
- List of Ireland national rugby union players
