= Laurie Brownlie =

- Born: Jack Laurence Brownlie; 25 November 1899 Makirikiri, Wanganui, New Zealand
- Died: 8 October 1972 (aged 72) Napier, New Zealand
- School: St Patrick's College, Wellington
- Notable relative(s): Maurice Brownlie (brother); Cyril Brownlie (brother)

Rugby union career
- Position: Loose forward
Provincial / State sides
Years	Team	Apps	(Points)
	Hawke's Bay	6	
International career
Years	Team	Apps	(Points)
1921	New Zealand	0	(0)

Jack Laurence "Laurie" Brownlie (25 November 1899 – 8 October 1972) was a New Zealand rugby union player. A loose forward, Brownlie represented Hawke's Bay at a provincial level, and was a member of the New Zealand national side, the All Blacks, in 1921. He played just one game for the All Blacks, against New South Wales, and did not appear in any Test matches.

His brothers Cyril and Maurice were both in the 1924-25 tour of Britain by the Invincibles.
