= Abe Munro =

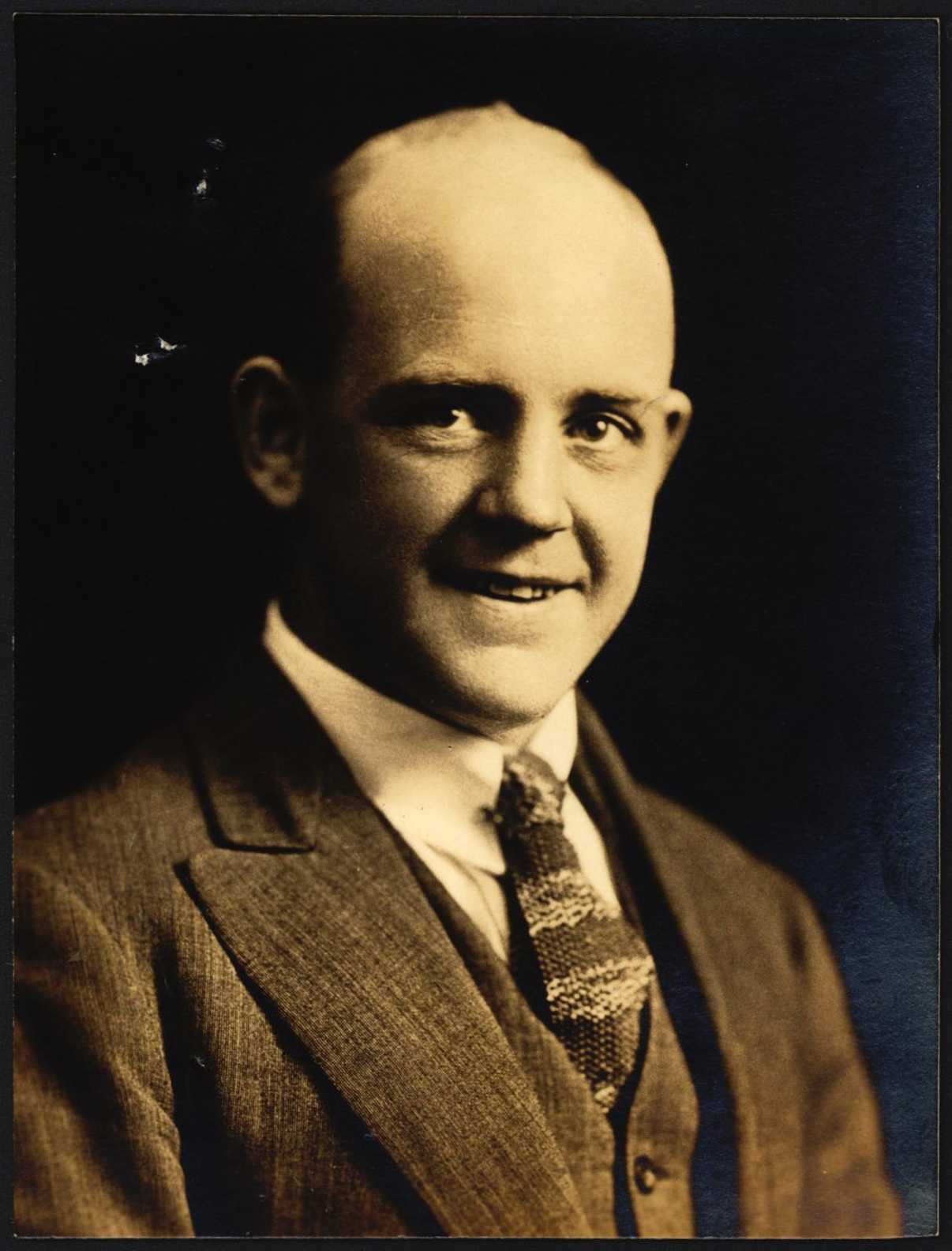
- Born: Henry Gordon Munro; 8 December 1896 Invercargill, New Zealand
- Died: 21 November 1974 (aged 77) Clyde, New Zealand
- Height: 1.75 m (5 ft 9 in)
- Weight: 74 kg (163 lb)
- University: Canterbury University College; University of Otago

Rugby union career
- Position: Hooker
Provincial / State sides
Years	Team	Apps	(Points)
1920–21	Canterbury		
1922–24	Otago		
International career
Years	Team	Apps	(Points)
1924–25	New Zealand	0	(0)

Henry Gordon "Abe" Munro (8 December 1896 – 21 November 1974) was a New Zealand rugby union player. A hooker, Munro represented Canterbury and Otago at a provincial level. He was a member of the New Zealand national side, the All Blacks, on their 1924 tour of New South Wales and 1924–25 tour of Britain, Ireland, France and Canada. On those tours, he played nine matches for the All Blacks, but did not appear in any internationals.

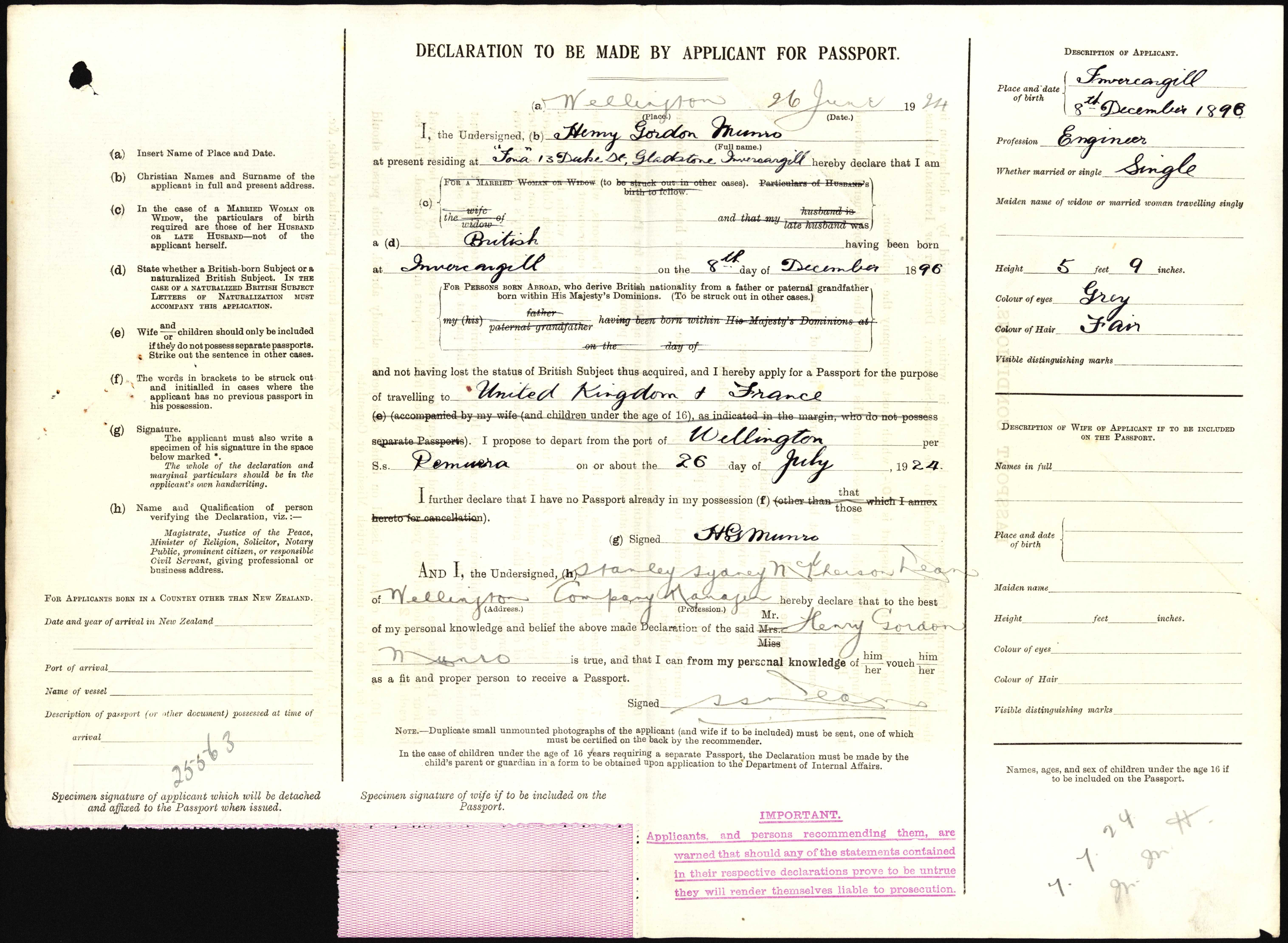
Henry Gordon Munro passport application (1924)
