= Bill Collopy =

Irish rugby union player (1894–1972)

- Full name: William Patrick Collopy
- Born: 5 May 1894 Dublin, Ireland
- Died: 15 July 1972 (aged 78) Portstewart, Ireland
- Notable relative(s): George Collopy (father); Dick Collopy (brother)

Rugby union career
- Position: Front row
International career
Years	Team	Apps	(Points)
1914–24	Ireland	19	(0)

William Patrick "Bill" Collopy (5 May 1894 — 15 July 1972) was an Irish international rugby union player.

Born in Dublin, Collopy was the eldest son of George Collopy, an Ireland forward, and a brother of Dick Collopy, who was an Ireland teammate in the Ireland front row of the early 1920s.

Collopy, a Bective Rangers player, made his Ireland debut as a hooker in the 1914 Five Nations, then missed a lot of rugby due to World War I, during which he served with the Royal Field Artillery. He played some rugby for the Army following the armistice and returned to the Ireland front row in 1921. Continuing with Ireland until 1924, Collopy finished with 19 caps, the most from his family, and also had the distinction of captaining the team for several matches.

== See also ==
- List of Ireland national rugby union players
