= Tom McClelland =

Rugby union player from Northern Ireland

- Full name: Thomas Alexander McClelland
- Born: 10 August 1900 Ballymena, Co. Antrim
- Died: 12 August 1966 (aged 66) Warrington, England
- School: Ballymena Academy
- University: Queen's University Belfast

Rugby union career
- Position: Wing-forward
International career
Years	Team	Apps	(Points)
1921–24	Ireland	16	(6)

Thomas Alexander McClelland (10 August 1900 — 12 August 1966) was an Irish international rugby union player.

Born in Ballymena, County Antrim, McClelland attended Ballymena Academy and studied medicine at Queen's University Belfast. He was capped in 16 matches as a wing-forward for Ireland during his studies, missing only one match from 1921 to 1924, and also represented the combined Ireland-Scotland team in the 1923 centenary match. His last appearance for Ireland was against the "Invincible" 1924–25 All Blacks.

McClelland retired after getting his medical degree and moved to Warrington in England, where he was involved in rugby league administration as chairman of the Warrington RLFC.

== See also ==
- List of Ireland national rugby union players
