= Albert Freethy =

Welsh cricketer and rugby union referee

Personal information
- Full name: Albert Edwin Freethy
- Born: 27 April 1885; Swansea, Glamorgan, Wales
- Died: 17 July 1966 (aged 81); Cimla, Glamorgan, Wales
- Batting: Right-handed

Domestic team information
- Years: Team
- 1908–1921: Glamorgan

Career statistics
Competition	First-class
Matches	3
Runs scored	79
Batting average	26.33
100s/50s	–/–
Top score	31
Balls bowled	–
Wickets	–
Bowling average	–
5 wickets in innings	–
10 wickets in match	–
Best bowling	–
Catches/stumpings	1/–
- Source: Cricinfo, 27 July 2012

Albert Freethy (27 April 1885 – 17 July 1966) was a Welsh rugby union referee and first-class cricketer. He was born in Swansea and died in Cimla.

Freethy played his debut Minor Counties match in 1908, though he would only occasionally play in the period immediately before the war, notching up seven Minor Counties appearances before 1914. Freethy returned to the Minor Counties arena during 1920, and in Glamorgan's debut first-class season of 1921, which turned out to be his last in the County game, picked up three first-class appearances.

Following Freethy's retirement from cricket, he would further pursue his love of rugby, becoming one of the great rugby union referees of the period, taking charge of eighteen tests between 1923 and 1931. During the 1924-25 tour by the New Zealand Invincibles, he sent off Cyril Brownlie during the England-New Zealand test, the first time a player had been sent off from a test. Freethy later served on Glamorgan's committee in the 1930s.
