= George Collopy =

Irish rugby union player

- Full name: George Smith Collopy
- Born: 23 March 1867 Limerick, Ireland
- Died: 1 September 1925 (aged 58) Dublin, Ireland
- Notable relative(s): Bill Collopy (son); Dick Collopy (son)

Rugby union career
- Position: Forward
International career
Years	Team	Apps	(Points)
1891–92	Ireland	2	(0)

George Smith Collopy (23 March 1867 — 1 September 1925) was an Irish international rugby union player.

Collopy was originally from Limerick, where he played rugby for Garryowen, but had joined Dublin club Bective Rangers by the time of his two Ireland caps, having found employment with Pim Brothers.

A forward, Collopy was capped for Ireland in Home Nations matches against Scotland in 1891 and 1892. His sons, front row forwards Dick and William, had longer international careers. The Collopy family was the first to have both a father and multiple sons play for Ireland, an achievement not repeated until the McKibbins over 50 years later.

== See also ==
- List of Ireland national rugby union players
