= Alex Spain =

Irish rugby union player

- Full name: Alexander William Spain
- Born: 22 September 1897 Cashel, Ireland
- Died: 24 February 1983 (aged 85) Dublin, Ireland
- School: Blackrock College
- University: University College Dublin
- Occupation: Gynaecologist

Rugby union career
- Position: Forward
International career
Years	Team	Apps	(Points)
1924	Ireland	1	(0)

Alexander William Spain (22 September 1897 — 24 February 1983) was an Irish international rugby union player.

Born in Cashel, County Tipperary, Spain attended Blackrock College and University College Dublin, which he captained.

Spain was capped once for Ireland, against the touring 1924–25 All Blacks at Lansdowne Road.

A gynaecologist, Spain was the Master of Holles Street Hospital from 1942 to 1948.

Spain married the granddaughter of politician Stephen O'Mara.

== See also ==
- List of Ireland national rugby union players
