= Gus Hart =

NZ rugby union player (1898–1965)

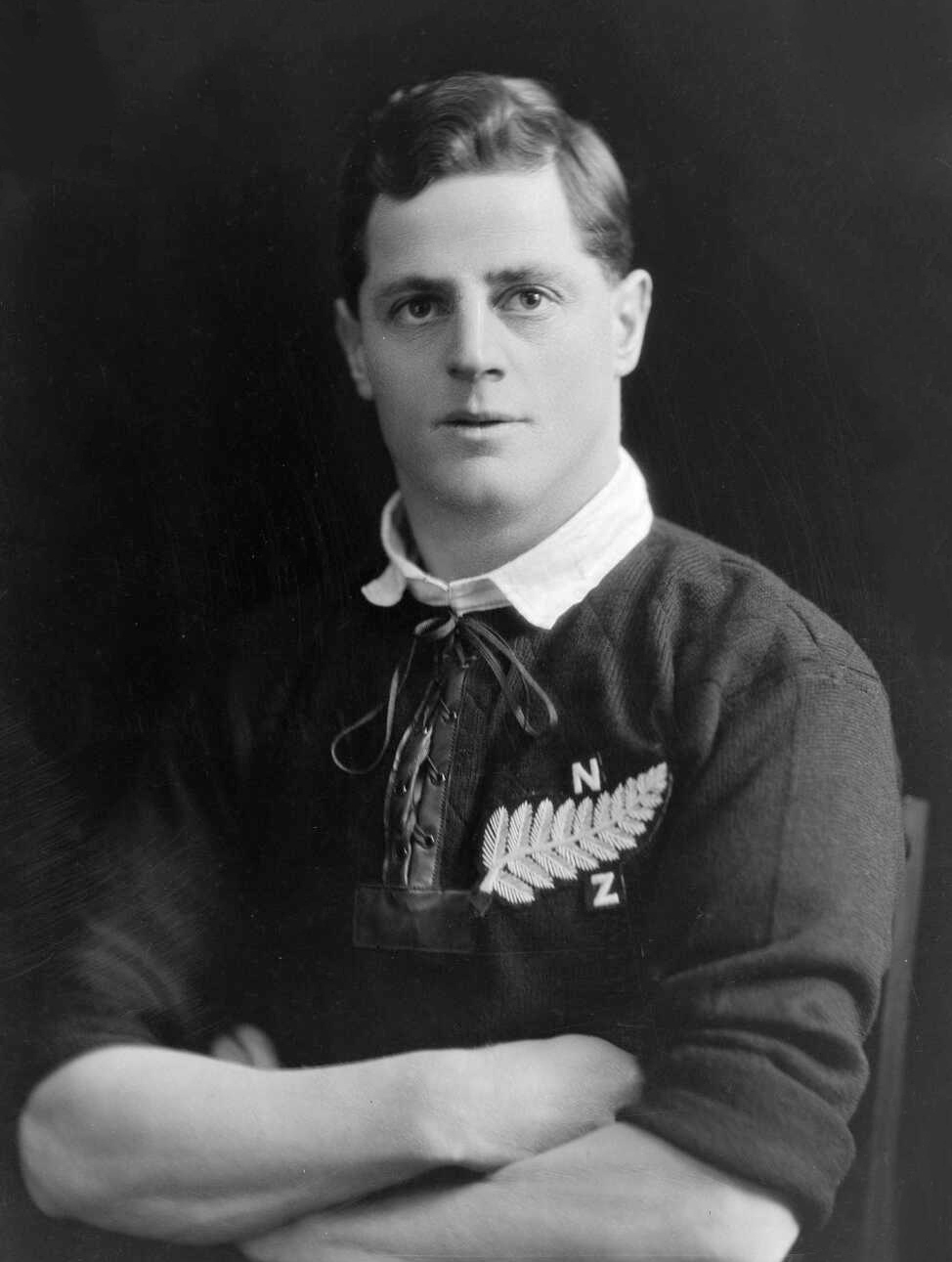
- Hart in 1924
- Born: Augustine Henry Hart; 27 March 1898 Auckland, New Zealand
- Died: 1 February 1965 (aged 66) Auckland, New Zealand
- Height: 1.68 m (5 ft 6 in)
- Weight: 65 kg (143 lb)
- School: Marist Brothers' School (Vermont Street, Auckland); Sacred Heart College; New Plymouth Technical College

Rugby union career
- Position: Wing three-quarter
Amateur team(s)
| Years | Team | Apps | (Points) |
| 1921, 1923 | Tukapa | | |
Provincial / State sides
| Years | Team | Apps | (Points) |
| 1921, 1923 | Taranaki | 8 | |
International career
| Years | Team | Apps | (Points) |
| 1924—25 | New Zealand | 1 | (0) |

Augustine Henry Hart (27 March 1898 – 1 February 1965) was a New Zealand rugby union player who represented the All Blacks, New Zealand's national rugby union team, between 1924 and 1925. His position of choice was wing three-quarter.

== Early life ==
Born in Auckland in 1898, Hart was first educated at the Marist Brothers' School on Vermont Street, Auckland (which was renovated and renamed: St. Columba Centre), he then moved to Sacred Heart College. He finished his education further down the country at New Plymouth Technical College where he was a member of the 1st XV between 1916 and 1917.

== Career and later life ==
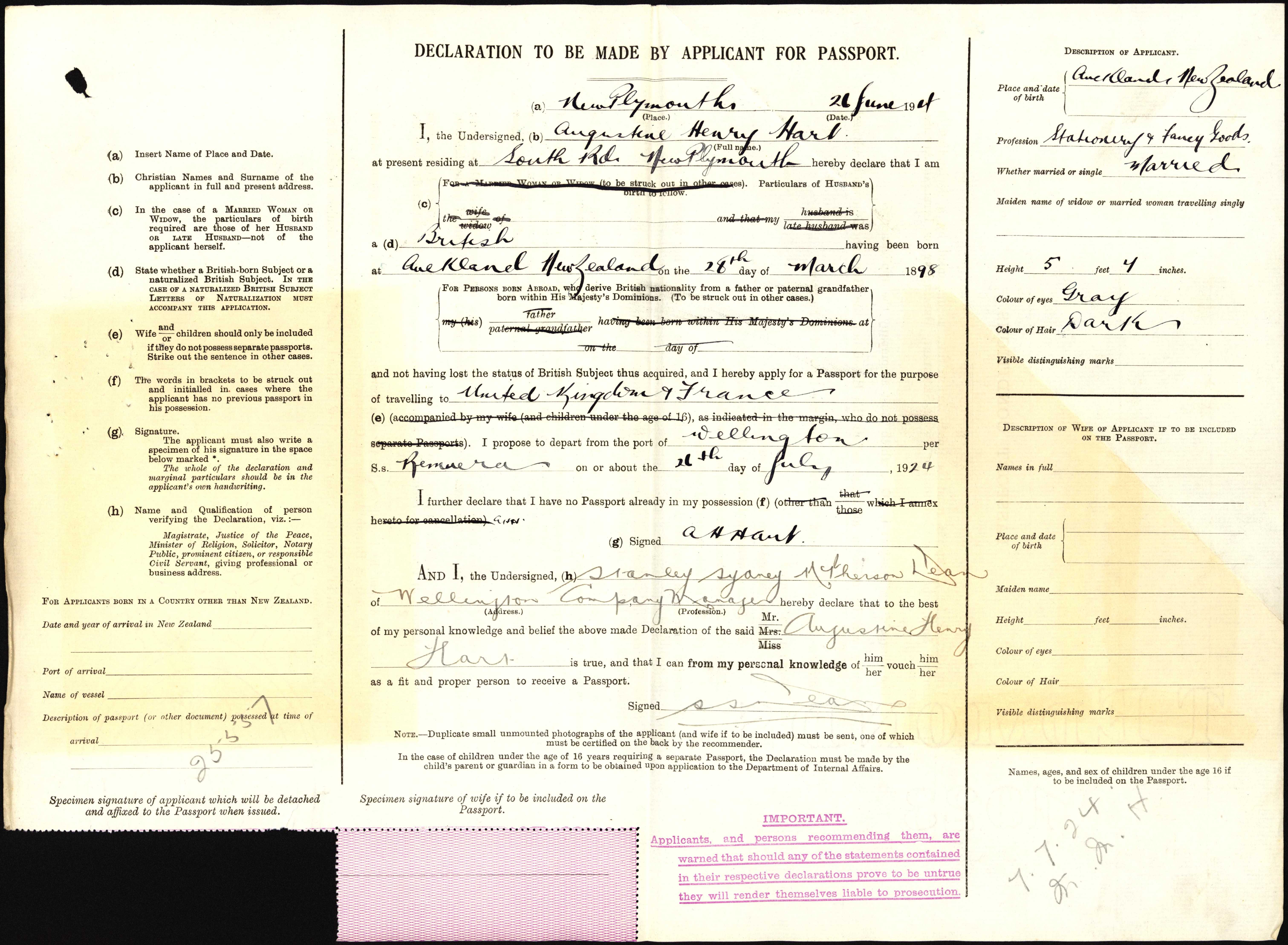
Augustine Hart passport application (1924)

After finishing school, Hart joined the Tukapa club.

In 1921, at the age of 24, Hart made his debut for the Taranaki province. He played just 2 matches in his rookie season and did not play at all in 1922, however in 1923 he won 6 caps for the union.

In his early playing days in Auckland Hart played as a five-eighth, but upon transferring to Taranaki, considering his height and weight along with his remarkable speed it was decided he would play as a wing three-quarter.

After playing exceptionally well in the trials Hart was to be selected for the 1924–25 "invincibles" tour of the Northern Hemisphere. In the 3 matches played before leaving in Australia and New Zealand Hart scored three tries from 3 matches.

From 14 matches on the tour Hart scored 20 tries. This included scoring 4 tries in matches against Cheshire, Yorkshire and Cumberland respectively. He also scored 3 tries against Durham.

Although he played 16 games for the All Blacks his only test cap was against Ireland, as others in the squad were preferred over Hart. The test was won 6-0. Unfortunately a leg injury ended Hart's career early. In a career of just 29 first-class matches, 17 of those were played for the All Blacks.

He died in Auckland in 1965.
