= Harold Kittermaster =

England international rugby union player

- Full name: Harold James Kittermaster
- Born: 7 January 1902 Uppingham, England
- Died: 28 March 1967 (aged 65) Broughton, Scotland
- School: Rugby School
- University: University College, Oxford
- Occupation: Schoolmaster

Rugby union career
- Position: Stand-off
International career
| Years | Team | Apps | (Points) |
| 1925–26 | England | 7 | (9) |

Harold James Kittermaster (7 January 1902 – 28 March 1967) was an English international rugby union player.

Born in Uppingham, Kittermaster captained the cricket, hockey and rugby teams at Rugby School. He pursued further studies at University College, Oxford, and won blues in rugby. Capped seven times for England, Kittermaster was a stand-off and scored three tries, including one on debut against the All Blacks at Twickenham in 1925.

Kittermaster married the sister of Scotland international Phil Macpherson.

A teacher by profession, Kittermaster was Assistant Master at Sherborne School and Rugby School, before succeeding John Bruce Lockhart as headmaster of Cargilfield Preparatory School, a position he would hold from 1937 to 1961.

== See also ==
- List of England national rugby union players
