= George Stephenson (rugby union) =

Rugby union player from Northern Ireland

- Born: George Vaughan Stephenson; 22 December 1901 Dromore, Ireland
- Died: 6 August 1970 (aged 68) Lambeth, London

Rugby union career
International career
Years	Team	Apps	(Points)
1920–1930	Ireland	42	(89)

George Vaughan Stephenson (22 December 1901 – 6 August 1970) born in Dromore, County Down, was an Irish rugby union player and doctor. Stephenson played club rugby for Queens University, North of Ireland, Middlesex, the London Hospital, Haileybury College, London Irish and Barbarians and international rugby for Ireland, winning forty two caps and holding multiple rugby records

== Early life ==
His father was a Church of Ireland clergyman. Stephenson was educated at Clanrye preparatory school in Belfast, Royal Belfast Academical Institution in Belfast and he graduated in medicine from QUB in 1926.

== Rugby career ==
Stephenson played wing and centre for Ireland. He won his first cap against France in Lansdowne Road on 3 April 1920.

== National Records ==
When Stephenson retired on 08/03/1930 he held a number of records, his Ireland cap total of 42 caps was a world record and this record stood for 27 years until Jack Kyle won his 43rd cap on 9 March 1957. Stephenson also held the Irish try-scoring record of 14 for over 62 years from 31 December 1928 until broken by Brendan Mullin on 16 March 1991. Stephenson also held the points scoring record for Ireland. This wasn't bettered until Tom Kiernan reached 90 points in 1968. During his ten-year playing career with Ireland, he only missed one game due to injury against Scotland on 23 February 1929. He also captained Ireland for his last 12 games.

On 29 November 1924 Stephenson captained Ireland against the "invincibles" of New Zealand 1924–25 New Zealand rugby union tour of Britain, Ireland and France.

His older brother Henry Stephenson also represented Ireland.

He left Ireland for London to pursue his medical career and he died there in 1970.

== Life after rugby ==
He moved to London in 1930 to practise medicine. He stayed in London for the rest of his life but suffered from severe arthritis in later years. He was married with three children. He died on 6 August 1970 at St Thomas's Hospital, London. His last address was 34 Elm Walk, Radlett, Hertfordshire.
