= Neil McGregor (rugby union) =

NZ international rugby union player

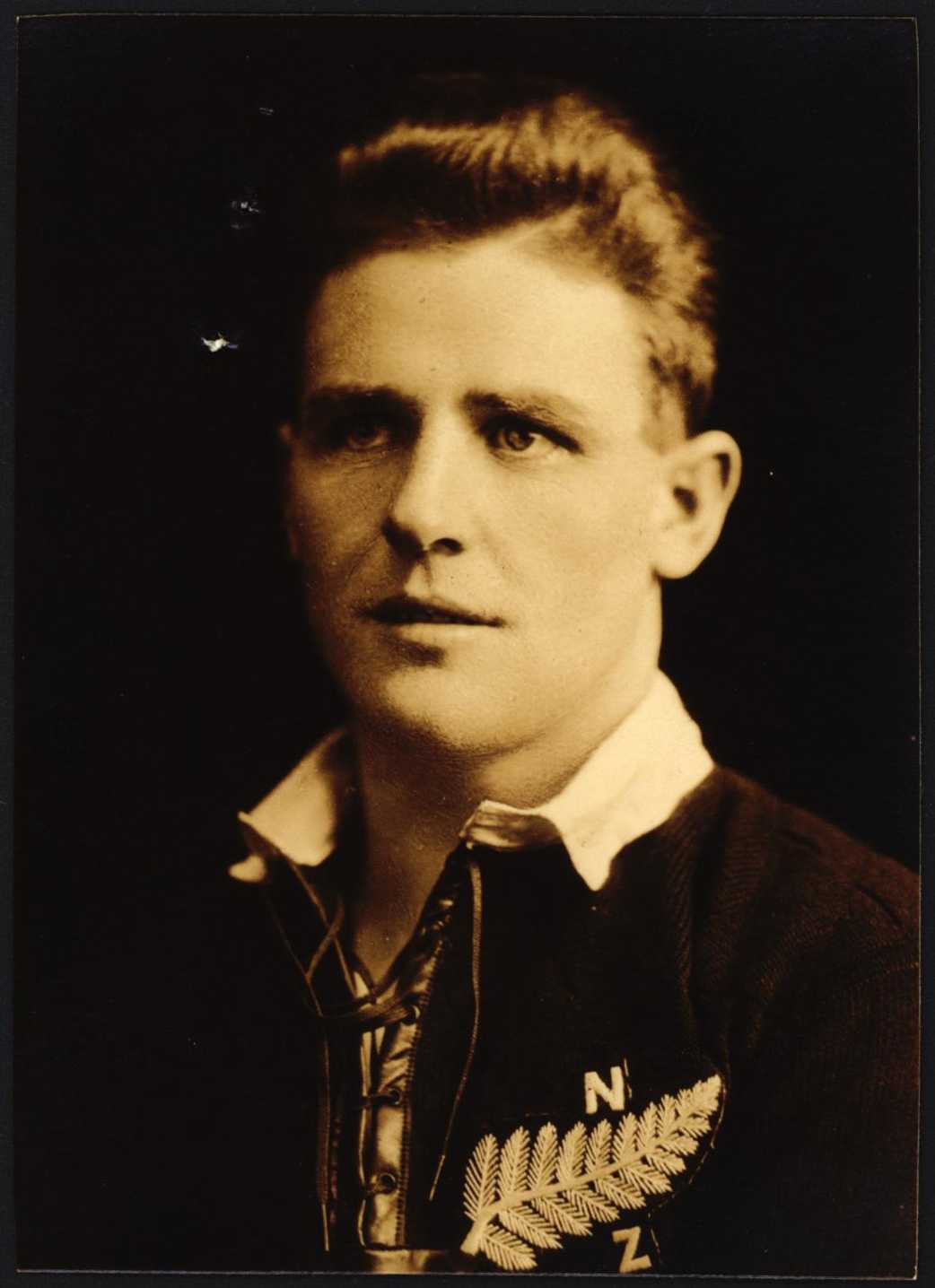
- McGregor in 1924
- Born: Neil Perriam McGregor; 29 December 1901 Lowburn, New Zealand
- Died: 12 July 1973 (aged 71) Hokitika, New Zealand
- Height: 1.70 m (5 ft 7 in)
- Weight: 67 kg (148 lb)
- School: Gore High School
- Occupation: Customs officer

Rugby union career
- Position(s): First five-eighth Second five-eighth
Provincial / State sides
Years	Team	Apps	(Points)
1923	Wellington	2	
1925–30	Canterbury	15	
International career
Years	Team	Apps	(Points)
1924–28	New Zealand	2	(0)
Coaching career
- Years: Team
- 1961–63: Nelson

Neil Perriam McGregor (29 December 1901 – 12 July 1973) was a New Zealand rugby union player. A first or second five-eighth, McGregor represented Wellington and Canterbury at a provincial level, and was a member of the New Zealand national side, the All Blacks, from 1924 to 1928. He played 27 matches for the All Blacks including two internationals. He went on to serve as the selector and coach of the Nelson provincial side from 1961 to 1963, and was a South Island selector from 1965 to 1968.

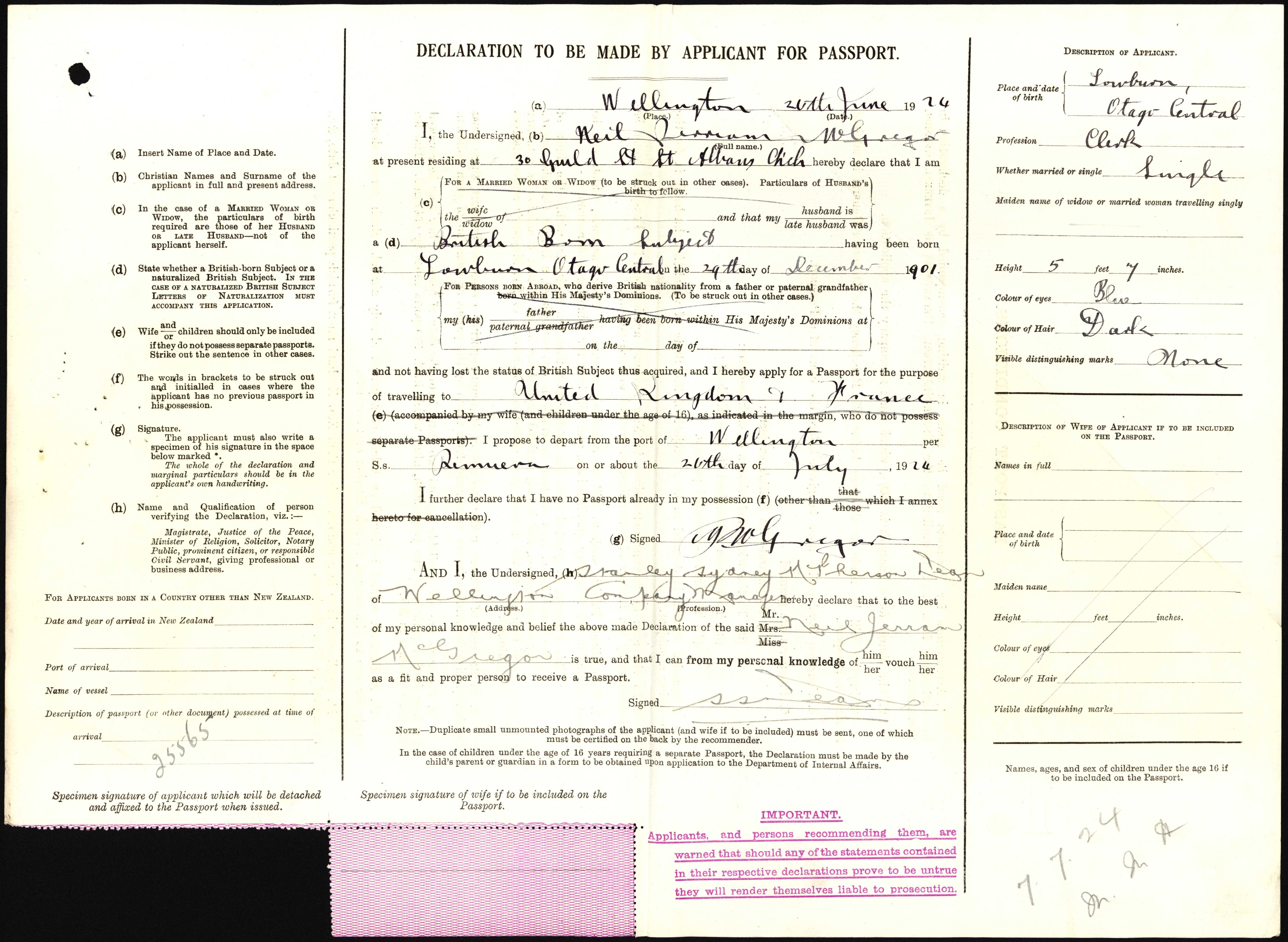
Neil McGregor Passport application (1924)
