= Cliff Gibbs =

English rugby union player

- Full name: John Clifford Gibbs
- Born: 10 March 1902 Bromley, England
- Died: 11 January 1998 (aged 95) Thanet, England
- School: Queen's College, Taunton

Rugby union career
- Position: Wing three-quarter
International career
Years	Team	Apps	(Points)
1925–27	England	7	(6)

John Clifford Gibbs (10 March 1902 – 11 January 1998) was an English international rugby union player.

Born in Bromley, Gibbs got sent to Queen's College, Taunton, during the war. He played a lot of football in his youth and was good enough to be offered a trial with Fulham.

Gibbs was an attacking wing three-quarter, regarded as one of the fastest players in rugby, but could at times be susceptible in defence. In the early 1920s, Gibbs joined Harlequins and started making representative appearances for Kent, scoring five tries against Eastern Counties on debut. He gained his first England call up in 1925 when he was picked on the left wing against the All Blacks at Twickenham. Capped seven times, Gibbs played with England until 1927 and scored the decisive try that year against Ireland at Twickenham.

After finishing up in rugby, Gibbs returned to football and played in the amateur Athenian League with Bromley. He worked for his cousin's printing business Purnell and Sons. In World War II, Gibbs was mentioned in dispatches serving as a squadron leader in the RAF Bomber Command.

Gibbs had a brother, Will, who served as Bromley mayor and Rugby Football Union president.

== See also ==
- List of England national rugby union players
