= Les Cupples =

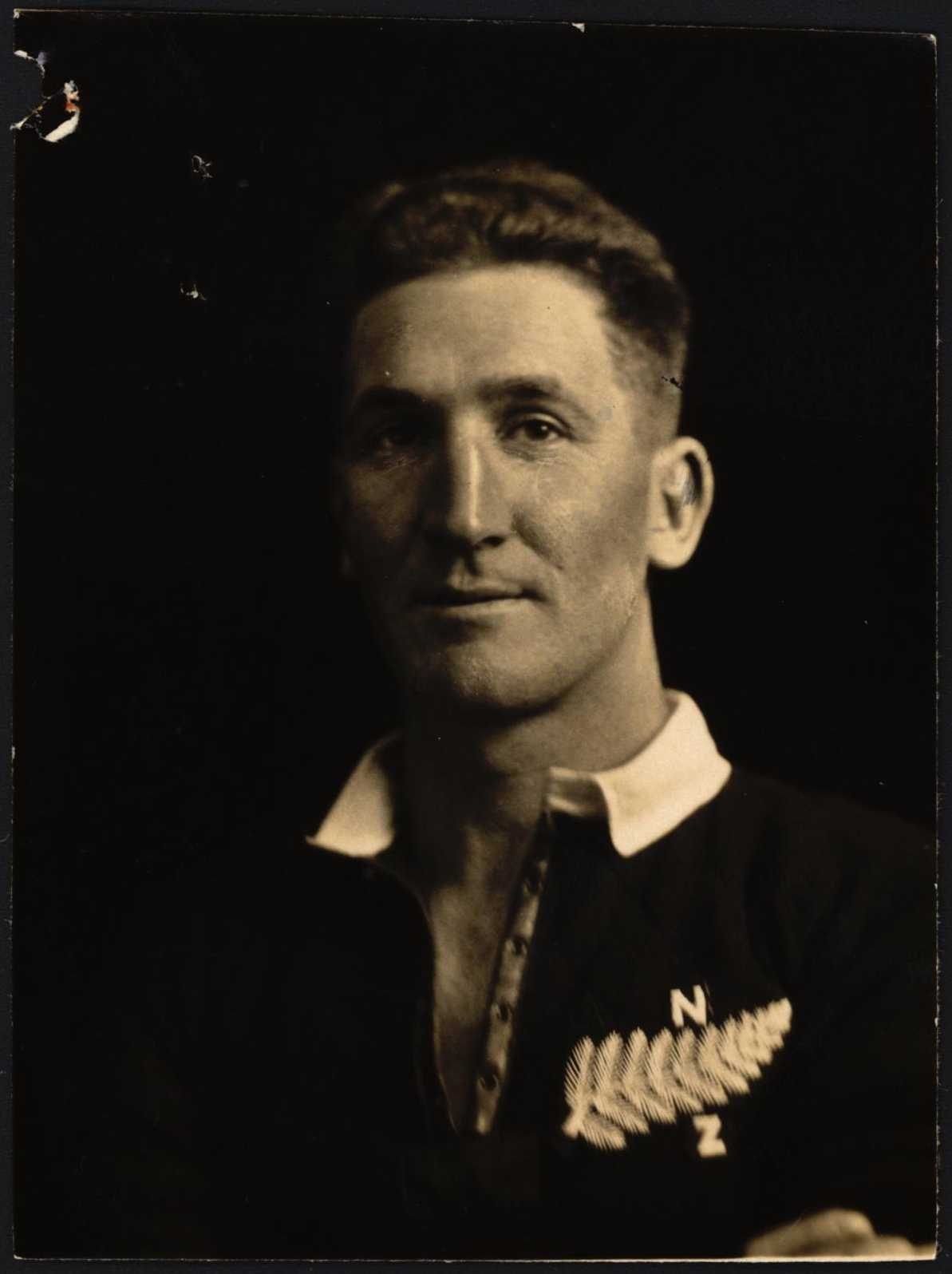
- Born: Leslie Frank Cupples; 8 February 1898 Otautau, New Zealand
- Died: 10 August 1972 (aged 74) Hamilton, New Zealand
- Height: 1.91 m (6 ft 3 in)
- Weight: 89 kg (196 lb)
- Occupation: Farmer

Rugby union career
- Position: Loose forward
Provincial / State sides
Years	Team	Apps	(Points)
1920–23	Bay of Plenty	6	
International career
Years	Team	Apps	(Points)
1922–25	New Zealand	2	(0)

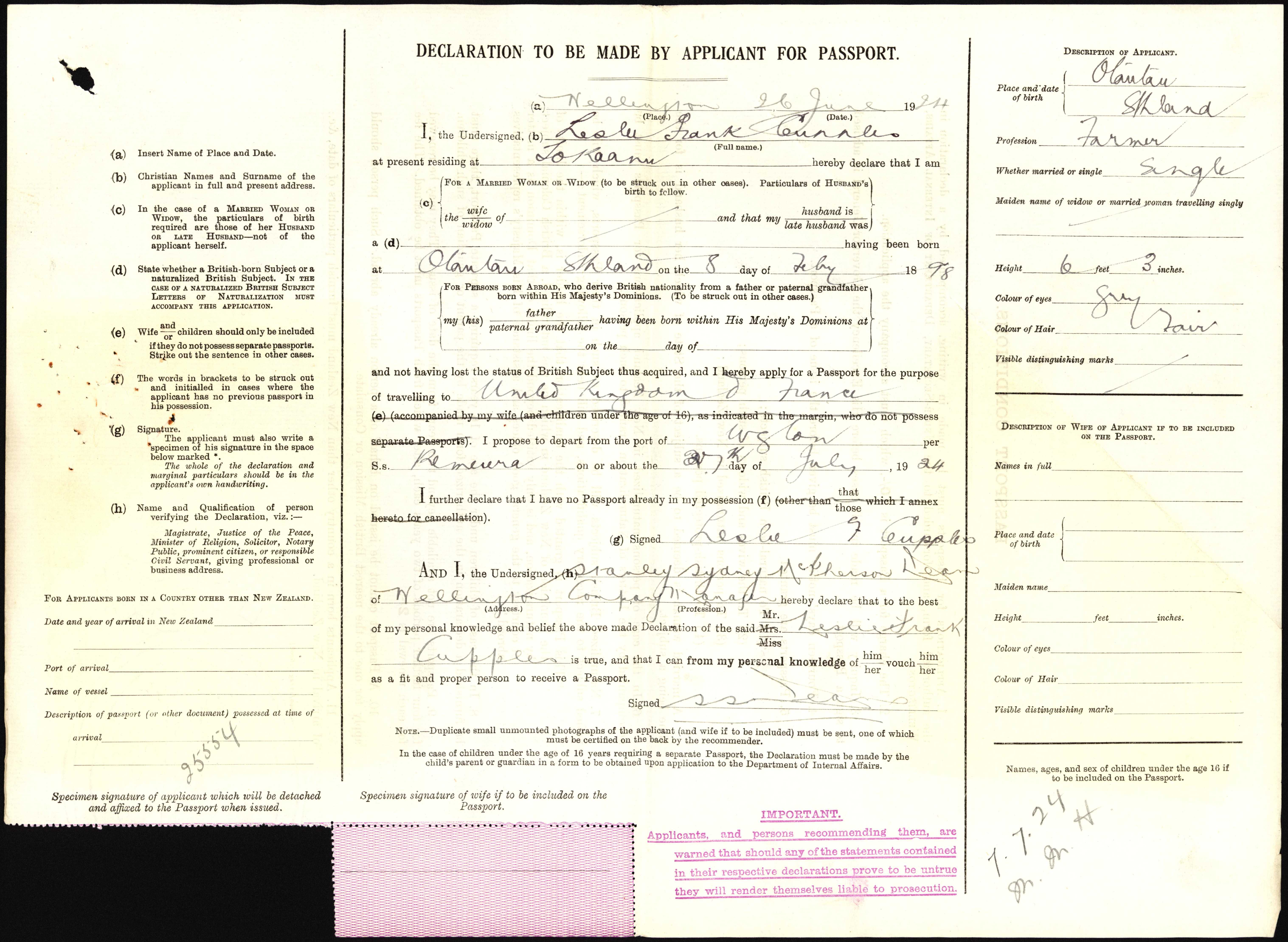
Leslie Frank Cupples passport application (1924)

Leslie Frank Cupples MM (8 February 1898 – 10 August 1972) was a New Zealand rugby union player. A loose forward, Cupples represented Bay of Plenty at a provincial level, and was a member of the New Zealand national side, the All Blacks, from 1922 to 1925. He played 29 matches for the All Blacks including two internationals, scoring six tries in all.

Cupples was almost certainly the only member of the Exclusive Brethren sect to play for the All Blacks. He married Miriel Ann Robertson in Rotorua on 8 December 1925, a Tuesday. (Members of the Exclusive Brethren faith are required to only be married on Tuesdays).

During World War I, Cupples served with the New Zealand Medical Corps in Egypt and on the Western Front, rising to the rank of corporal. He was attached to the No. 2 Field Ambulance, and in 1917 was awarded the Military Medal.

Cupples farmed on Cambridge Rd near Hanlin Rd. He was particularly proud of his belted Galloway cattle.

Cupples died in Hamilton on 10 August 1972, and was buried at Hautapu Cemetery, Cambridge.
