= Ian Harvey (rugby union) =

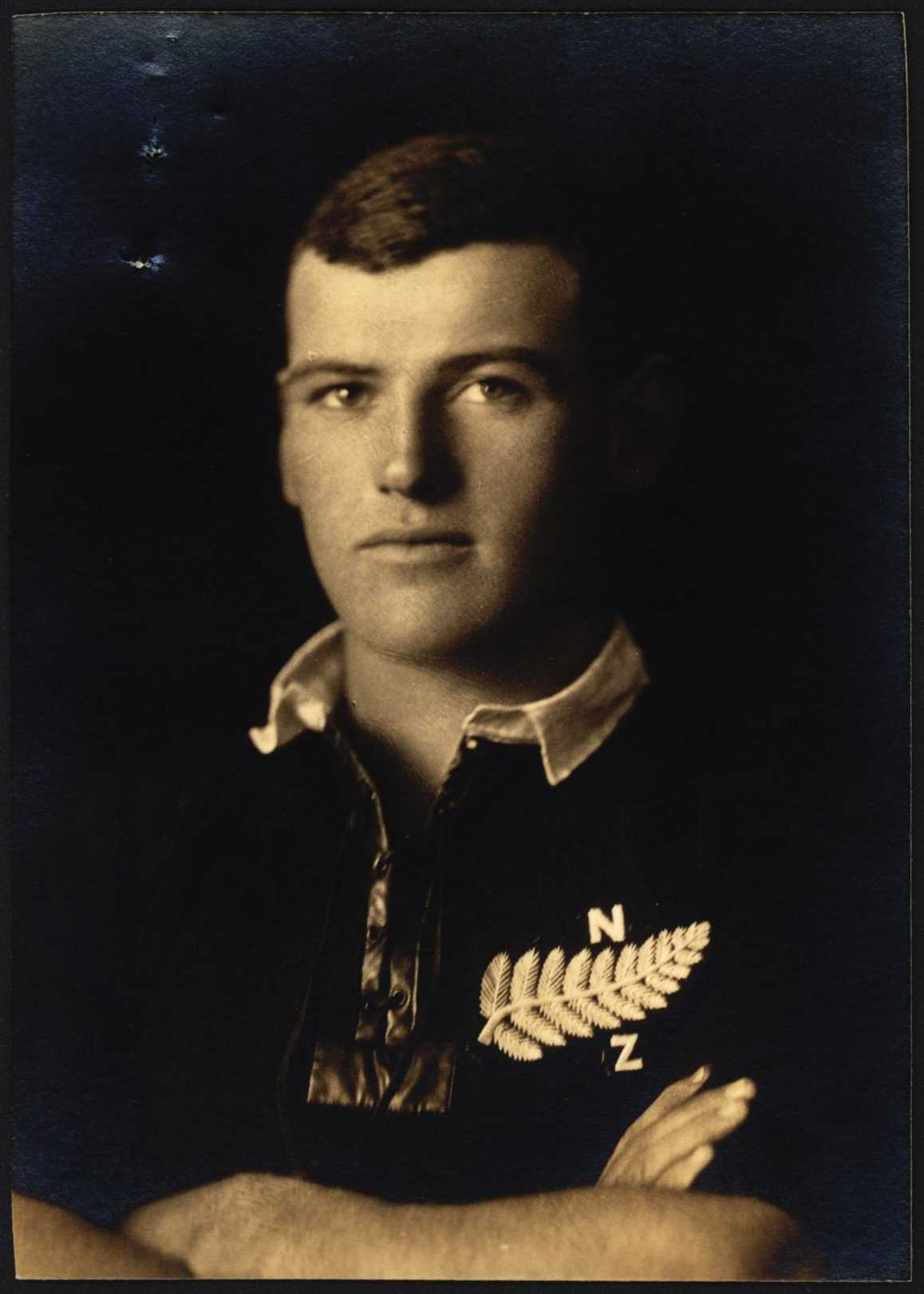
- Born: Ian Hamilton Harvey; 1 January 1903 Masterton, New Zealand
- Died: 22 October 1966 (aged 63) Wellington, New Zealand
- Height: 1.86 m (6 ft 1 in)
- Weight: 96 kg (212 lb)

Rugby union career
- Position: Lock
Provincial / State sides
Years	Team	Apps	(Points)
1922–30	Wairarapa	37	
International career
Years	Team	Apps	(Points)
1924–28	New Zealand	1	(0)

Ian Hamilton Harvey (1 January 1903 – 22 October 1966) was a New Zealand rugby union player. A lock, Harvey represented Wairarapa at a provincial level, and was a member of the New Zealand national side, the All Blacks, from 1924 to 1928. He played 18 matches for the All Blacks, including one international.

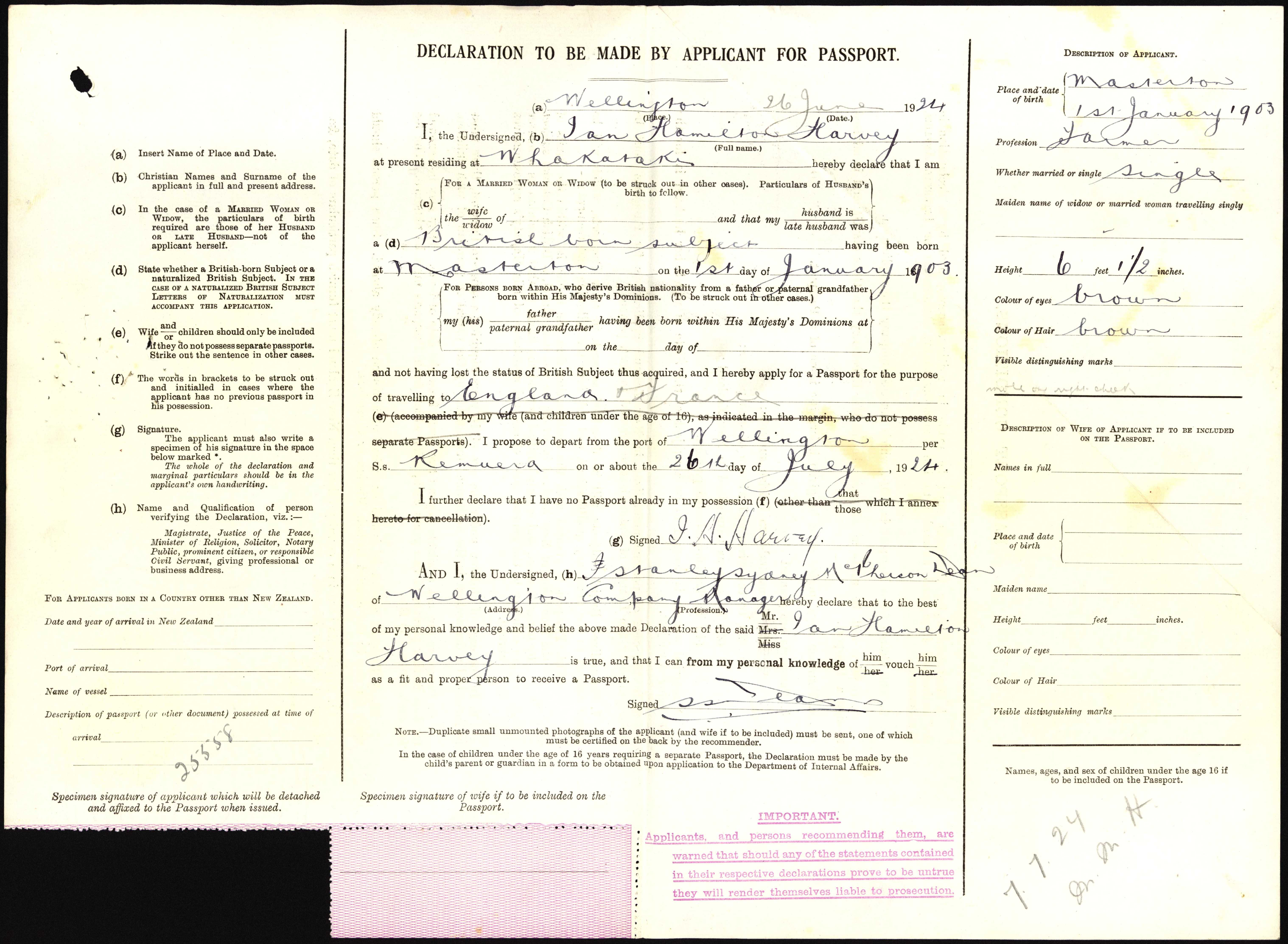
Ian Harvey passport application (1924)
