= Dick Collopy =

Irish rugby union player

- Full name: Richard J. Collopy
- Born: 2 May 1899 Dublin, Ireland
- Notable relative(s): George Collopy (father); Bill Collopy (brother)

Rugby union career
- Position: Front row
International career
Years	Team	Apps	(Points)
1923–25	Ireland	13	(0)

Richard J. Collopy was an Irish international rugby union player.

Born in Dublin, Collopy was the son of 1890s Ireland forward George Collopy.

Collopy suffered severe injuries serving as a lieutenant in the Royal Air Force during World War I.

A strong scrummager, Collopy was a tireless forward and played for Bective Rangers. He joined his brother Willie in the Ireland front row in 1923 and was a regular fixture in the team for three Five Nations campaign, also appearing once against the All Blacks.

== See also ==
- List of Ireland national rugby union players
