= Richard Hamilton-Wickes =

England international rugby union player

- Full name: Richard Henry Hamilton-Wickes
- Born: 31 December 1901 Middlesex, England
- Died: 2 June 1963 (aged 61) Surbiton, Surrey, England
- School: Bilton Grange; Wellington College
- University: Pembroke College, Cambridge

Rugby union career
- Position: Wing
International career
Years	Team	Apps	(Points)
1924–27	England	10	(12)

Richard Henry Hamilton-Wickes (31 December 1901 – 2 June 1963) was an English international rugby union player.

Hamilton-Wickes was born in Middlesex and went to preparatory school at Bilton Grange, before moving on to Wellington College. He studied at Pembroke College, Cambridge, and was awarded blues playing rugby for Cambridge University, including as captain in the 1923 Varsity Match. A wing three-quarter, Hamilton-Wickes also played for Harlequins.

Between 1924 and 1927, Hamilton-Wickes won 10 England caps, scoring a try on debut against Ireland in Belfast, which was his one appearance in England's grand slam-winning 1924 Five Nations campaign. He then gained regular selection over the next two years and was a member of side that played against the invincible 1924–25 All Blacks at Twickenham.

Hamilton-Wickes established and owned a nursing home on Langley Avenue in Surbiton called Hamilton Nursing Home, where he died in an accidental fire inside his flat in 1963, at 61 years of age.

== See also ==
- List of England national rugby union players
