= Cliff Porter =

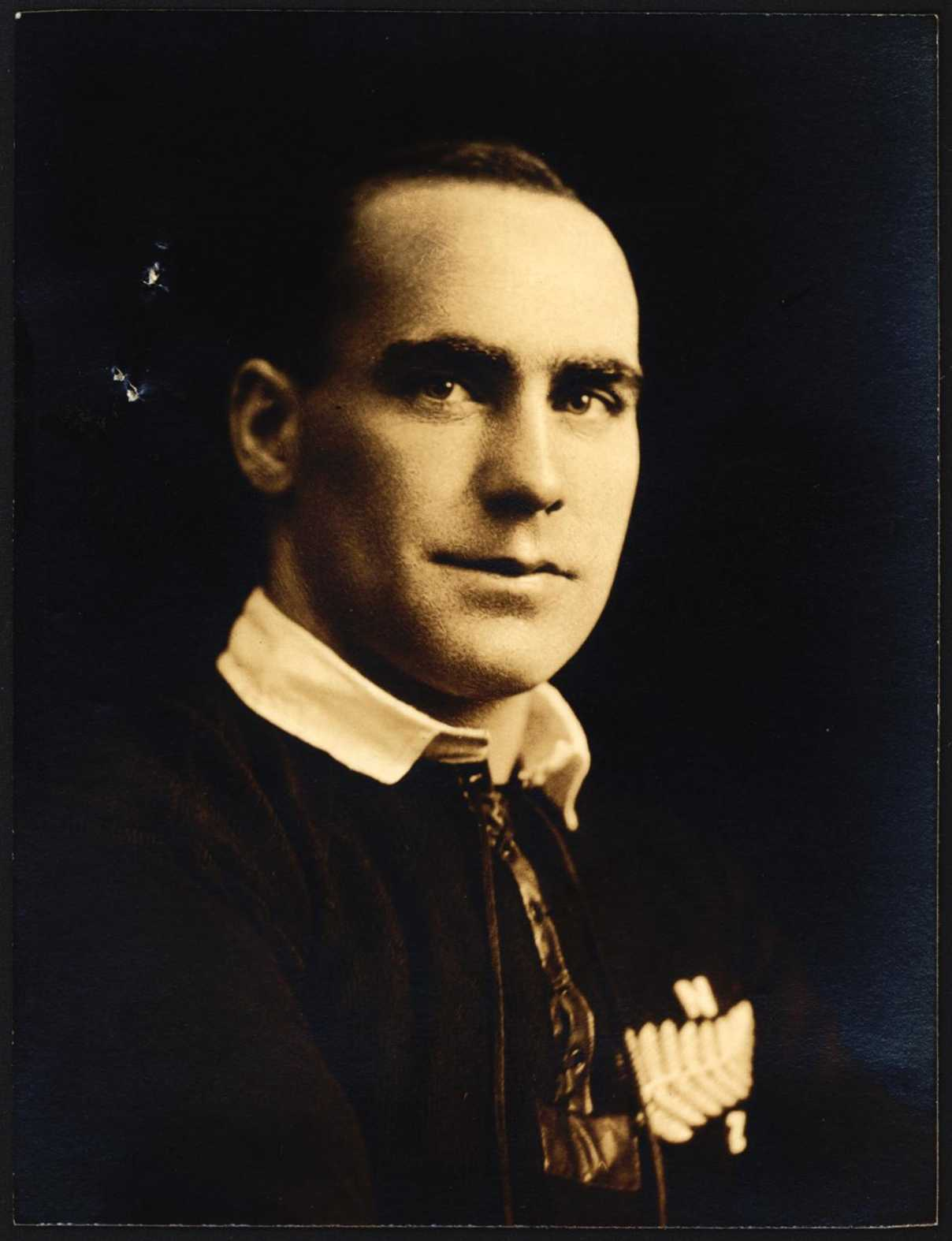
- Born: 5 May 1899 Edinburgh
- Died: 12 November 1976 (aged 77) Wellington
- Height: 1.73 m (5 ft 8 in)
- Weight: 85 kg (187 lb)

Rugby union career
- Position: Wing forward (Flanker)
International career
Years	Team	Apps	(Points)
1923–1930	New Zealand	41	(48)

Scottish-born Clifford Glen Porter (5 May 1899 in Edinburgh – 12 November 1976 in Wellington) was a New Zealand rugby union player. Playing as a wing forward, he represented Wellington at a provincial level and captained the New Zealand national side, the All Blacks. He represented New Zealand in 41 international matches, seven of them at full test level, scoring 16 tries.

Porter replaced Ces Badeley as captain of the New Zealand team, leading them on the 1924-5 tour during which they gained the name of The Invincibles, winning all 32 of the matches they played.

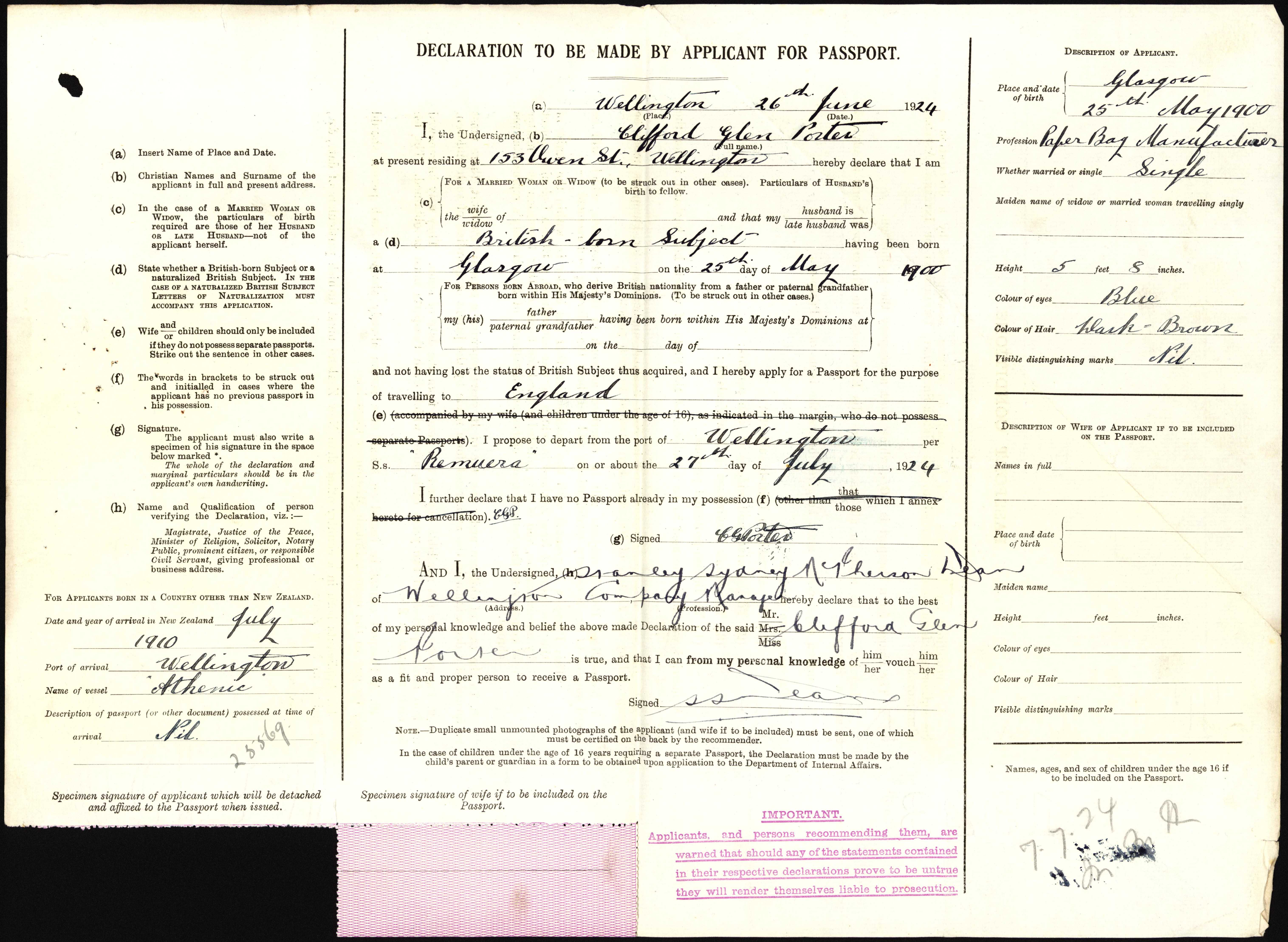
Clifford Glen Porter passport application file (1924)
