= Cyril Brownlie =

New Zealand rugby union player (1895–1954)

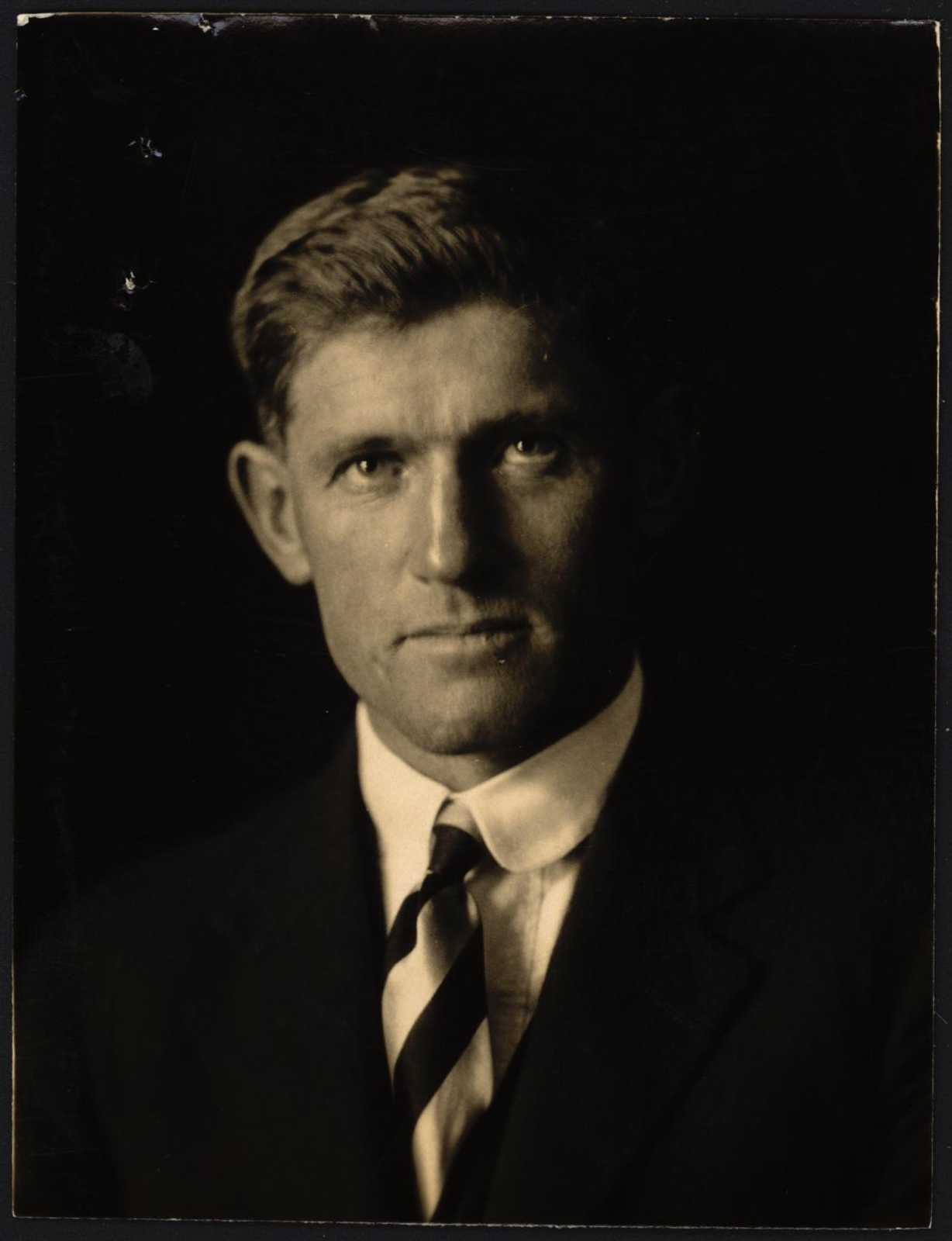
- Born: Cyril James Brownlie; 6 August 1895 Whanganui
- Died: 7 May 1954 (aged 58) Wairoa
- Height: 1.9 m (6 ft 3 in)
- Weight: 95 kg (209 lb)
- School: Sacred Heart College
- Notable relative(s): Laurie Brownlie (brother); Maurice Brownlie (brother)

Rugby union career
- Position: Loose forward
Amateur team(s)
Years	Team	Apps	(Points)
- Hastings
Provincial / State sides
Years	Team	Apps	(Points)
- Hawke's Bay
International career
Years	Team	Apps	(Points)
1924–1925	New Zealand	31	(33)

Cyril James Brownlie (6 August 1895 – 7 May 1954) was a New Zealand rugby union player. He was educated at Sacred Heart College, Auckland, unlike his brothers, Maurice and Laurie, who attended St Patrick's College, Wellington.

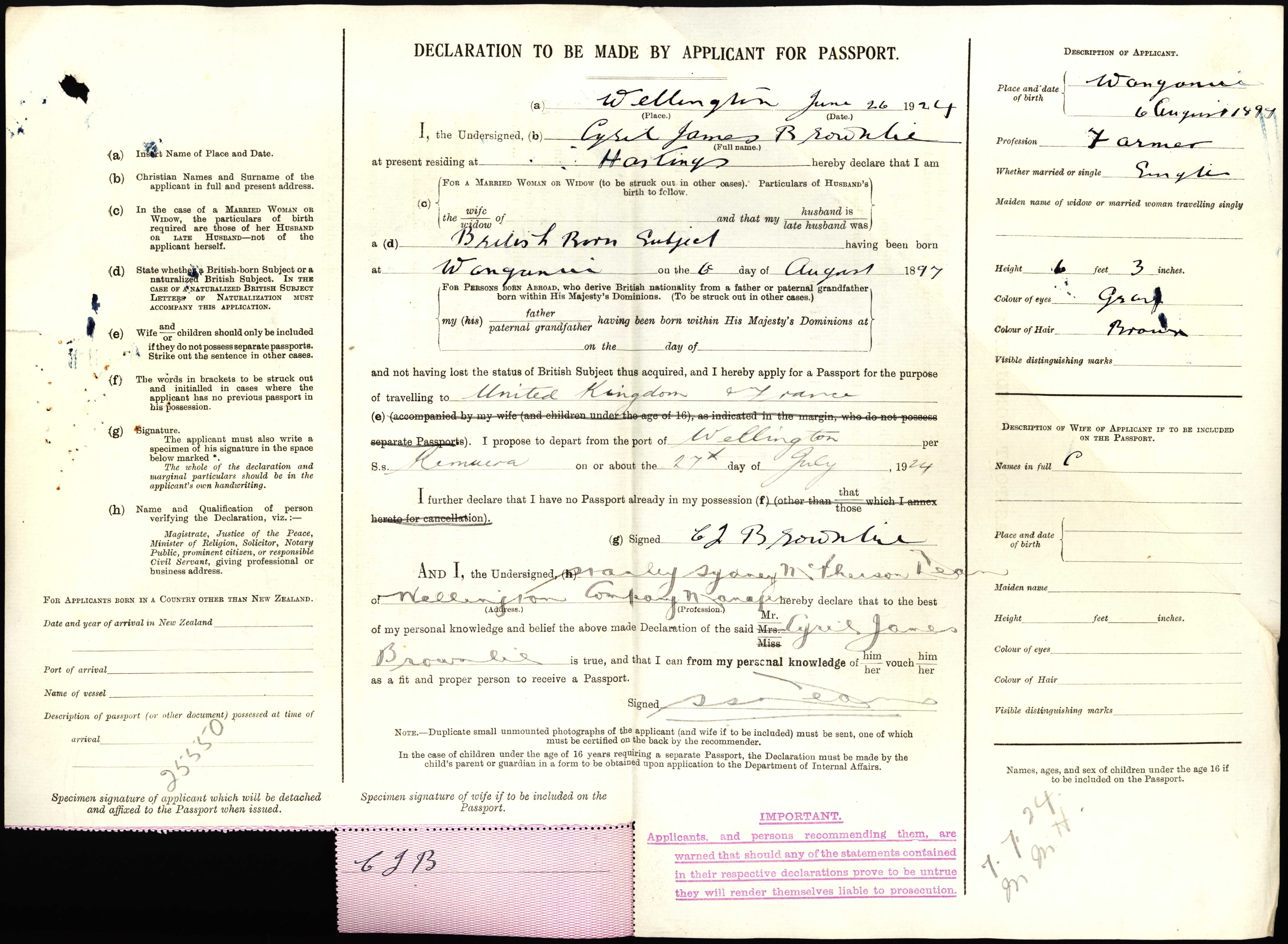
Cyril Brownlee passport application (1924)

The brothers represented the country during the 1920s. Cyril Brownlie played 31 matches for the All Blacks, scoring 11 tries. These matches included three tests during The Invincibles tour of 1924–25. During the England-New Zealand test in 1924, Cyril was sent off by the referee Albert Freethy, the first player to be sent off in an international between two International Rugby Board countries. Brownlie represented Hawkes Bay at a provincial level, playing as a loose forward. He retired from Rugby in 1930 and died at Wairoa on 7 May 1954
