= Maurice Brownlie =

New Zealand rugby player (1897–1957)

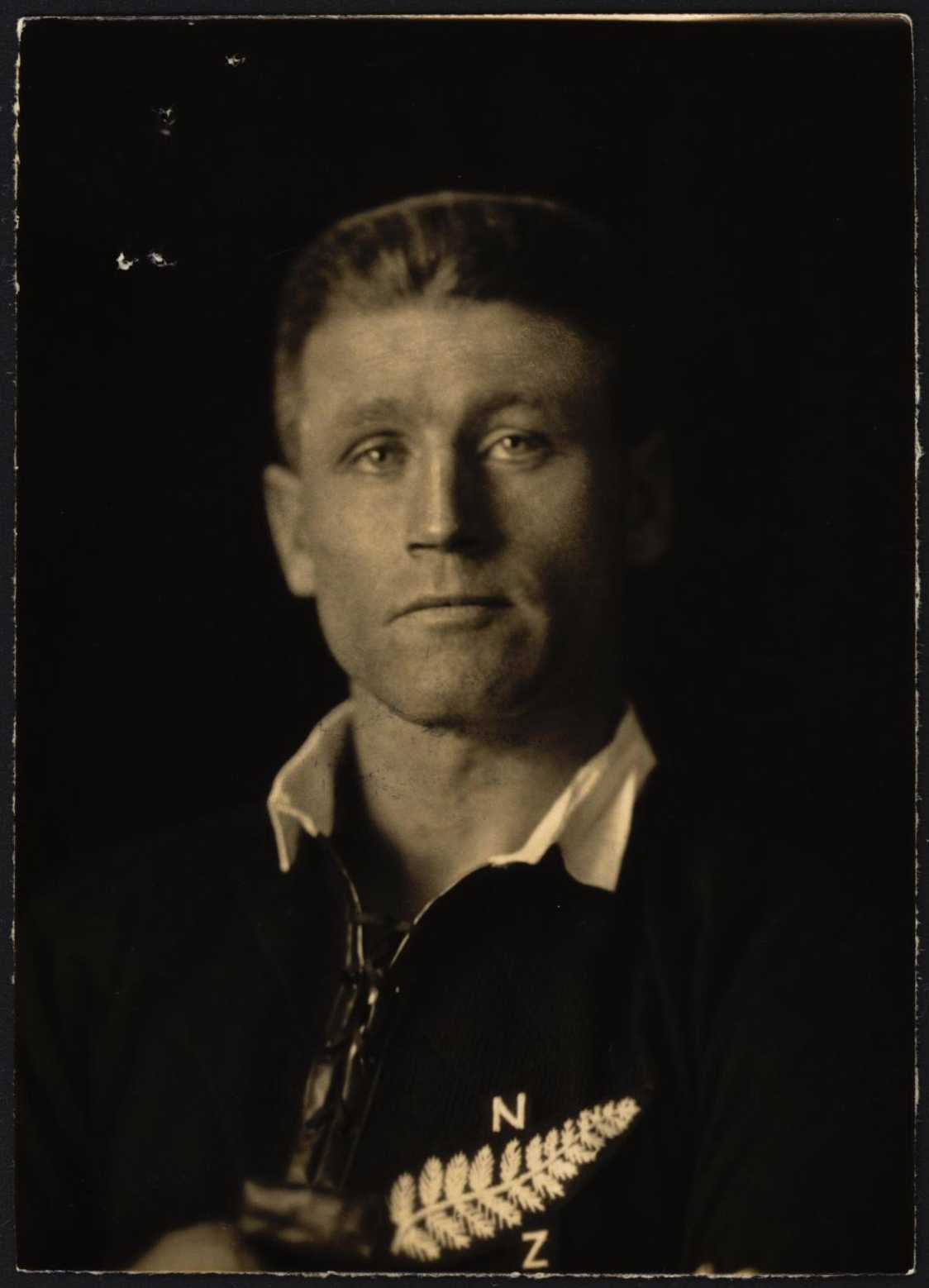
- Brownlie in 1924
- Born: Maurice John Brownlie; 10 August 1897 Wanganui, New Zealand
- Died: 21 January 1957 (aged 59) Gisborne, New Zealand
- Height: 1.85 m (6 ft 1 in)
- Weight: 90 kg (200 lb)
- School: St Patrick's College, Wellington
- Notable relative(s): Cyril Brownlie (brother); Laurie Brownlie (brother)

Rugby union career
- Position: Loose forward
Amateur team(s)
Years	Team	Apps	(Points)
- Hastings
Provincial / State sides
Years	Team	Apps	(Points)
1921–30	Hawke's Bay		
International career
Years	Team	Apps	(Points)
1922–28	New Zealand	8	(6)

Maurice Joseph Brownlie (10 August 1897 – 21 January 1957) was an international New Zealand rugby union player. A loose forward, Brownlie represented Hawke's Bay at a provincial level, and was a member of the New Zealand national team, the All Blacks, from 1922 until 1928. He played 61 matches for New Zealand—a record for All Black appearances that stood until surpassed by Kevin Skinner in 1956—and scored 21 tries. These matches included eight Tests. He captained the All Blacks on 19 occasions, including for the 1928 tour of South Africa.

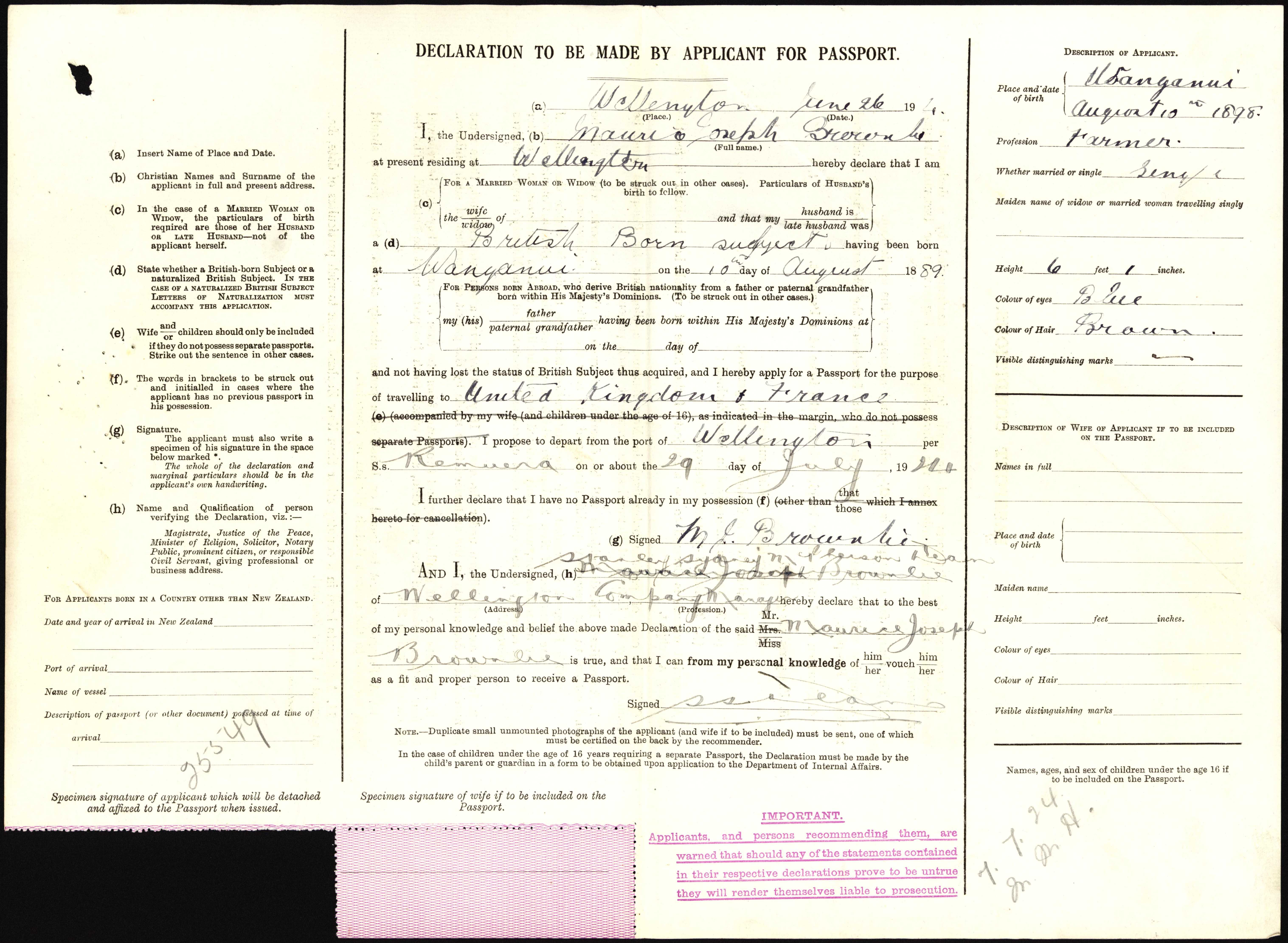
Maurice Brownlee passport application (1924)

Brownlie was a member of The Invincibles during their European tour of 1924–25. On that tour, his brother Cyril became the first man to be sent off in a Test match. Their older brother Laurie also made an appearance for the All Blacks, in 1921. All three brothers represented Hawke's Bay and played as loose forwards.

Brownlie gave service during both world wars. From 1915 to 1919 he served in the New Zealand Mounted Rifles Brigade, including two and a half years in the Middle East, and reached the rank of corporal. During the Second World War he served in No. 4 Squadron, Independent Mounted Rifles, part of the Home Guard, from 1940.

Brownlie died in Gisborne on 21 January 1957, and was buried at Taruheru Cemetery. He has been inducted into the New Zealand Sports Hall of Fame twice: as a member of The Invincibles, and in his own right.
