= Tom Johnson (rugby union, born 1893) =

Wales international rugby union player

- Born: Tom Albert W. Johnson c. 1893 Cardiff, Wales
- Died: 6 May 1948 (aged 54–55) Cardiff, Wales
- School: South Church Street Docks School

Rugby union career
- Position(s): Wing, Full back
Amateur team(s)
Years	Team	Apps	(Points)
- Penarth RFC
–	Cardiff RFC		
–	Newport RFC		
International career
Years	Team	Apps	(Points)
1921–1925	Wales	12	(6)

Tom Albert W. "Codger" Johnson (born c. 1893, Cardiff, died 6 May 1948, Cardiff) was a Wales international rugby union player. He captained the Wales national rugby union team on one occasion in 1925. Johnson played his club rugby for Cardiff RFC captaining the team during the 1924–25 season.
