= Robert Crichton (rugby union) =

Rugby union player from Northern Ireland

- Full name: Robert Young Crichton
- Born: 18 August 1897 Downpatrick, Co. Down
- Died: 29 July 1940 (aged 42) Dublin, Ireland
- School: Campbell College
- University: Trinity College Dublin

Rugby union career
- Position: Forward
International career
Years	Team	Apps	(Points)
1920–25	Ireland	15	(0)

Robert Young Crichton (18 August 1897 — 29 July 1940) was an Irish international rugby union player.

Born in Downpatrick, Crichton was the son of a newspaper editor, who was proprietor of the Down Recorder.

Crichton attended Belfast's Campbell College and had four years in the first XV, earning Ulster Schools representative honours. He was captain of Dublin University in 1924–25, while studying medicine at Trinity College.

A bulky forward, Crichton was capped 15 times for Ireland during the early 1920s, as a second row forward and occasional prop, in addition to an appearance with a combined Ireland-Scotland team in the 1923 centenary match.

== See also ==
- List of Ireland national rugby union players
