= 1924 New Zealand rugby union tour of New South Wales =

Summary
P	W	D	L
Total
4	3	0	1
Opponent
P	W	D	L
New South Wales (Note: The three matches played by New South Wales were retroactively accorded Test status by the Australian Rugby Union in 1986, but remain as tour matches only for the NZRU)
3	2	0	1

The 1924 New Zealand tour rugby to New South Wales was the 11th tour by the New Zealand national rugby union team to Australia.

During the First World War the activity of Rugby Union was suspended. In Australia, the sport was initially reprised only in New South Wales (many players switched to Rugby league especially in Queensland), so official test matches between the two national sides were not resumed until 1929.

The three most important matches were played against the New South Wales selection, and New Zealand won the 3 match series 2–1. In 1986 the Australian Rugby Union accorded Test status to the New South Wales matches played against international teams in the 1920–1928 period, but the matches against the All Blacks are not recorded as Tests by the New Zealand Rugby Union.

After this short tour, New Zealand played matches in own country against two provincial selections before departing for a tour of Britain, Ireland and France.

== Matches ==
'Scores and results list New Zealand's points tally first.

Opposing Team	For	Against	Date	Venue	Status
New South Wales	16	20	5 July 1924	Showground Sydney	Tour match
Metropolitan Union	38	5	9 July 1924	Showground Sydney	Tour match
New South Wales	21	5	12 July 1924	Showground Sydney	Tour match
New South Wales	38	8	16 July 1924	Showground Sydney	Tour match

== Post-tour matches ==
Scores and results list All Blacks' points tally first.

Opposing Team	For	Against	Date	Venue	Status
Auckland	3	14	23 July 1924	Eden Park, Auckland	Tour match
Manawatu-Horowhenua	27	12	26 July 1924	Showgrounds, Palmerston North	Tour match
