= Henry Stephenson (rugby union) =

Rugby union player from Northern Ireland

- Full name: Henry William Vaughan Stephenson
- Born: 28 November 1900 Dromore, Co. Down
- Died: 18 October 1958 (aged 57)

Rugby union career
- Position: Wing
International career
Years	Team	Apps	(Points)
1922–28	Ireland	14	(12)

Commander Henry William Vaughan Stephenson (28 November 1900 — 18 October 1958) was a Royal Navy officer and international rugby union player from Northern Ireland.

A native of Dromore, Co. Down, Stephenson was the eldest son born to Reverend Stephenson of St. Mary Magdalene Church, Belfast, and a brother of Ireland international George Stephenson.

Stephenson, a wing three-quarter, played for United Services and was a member of the Ireland team from 1922 to 1928. He gained a total of 14 caps and scored three tries, all during the 1925 Five Nations.

== See also ==
- List of Ireland national rugby union players
