= Read Masters =

New Zealand international rugby union player

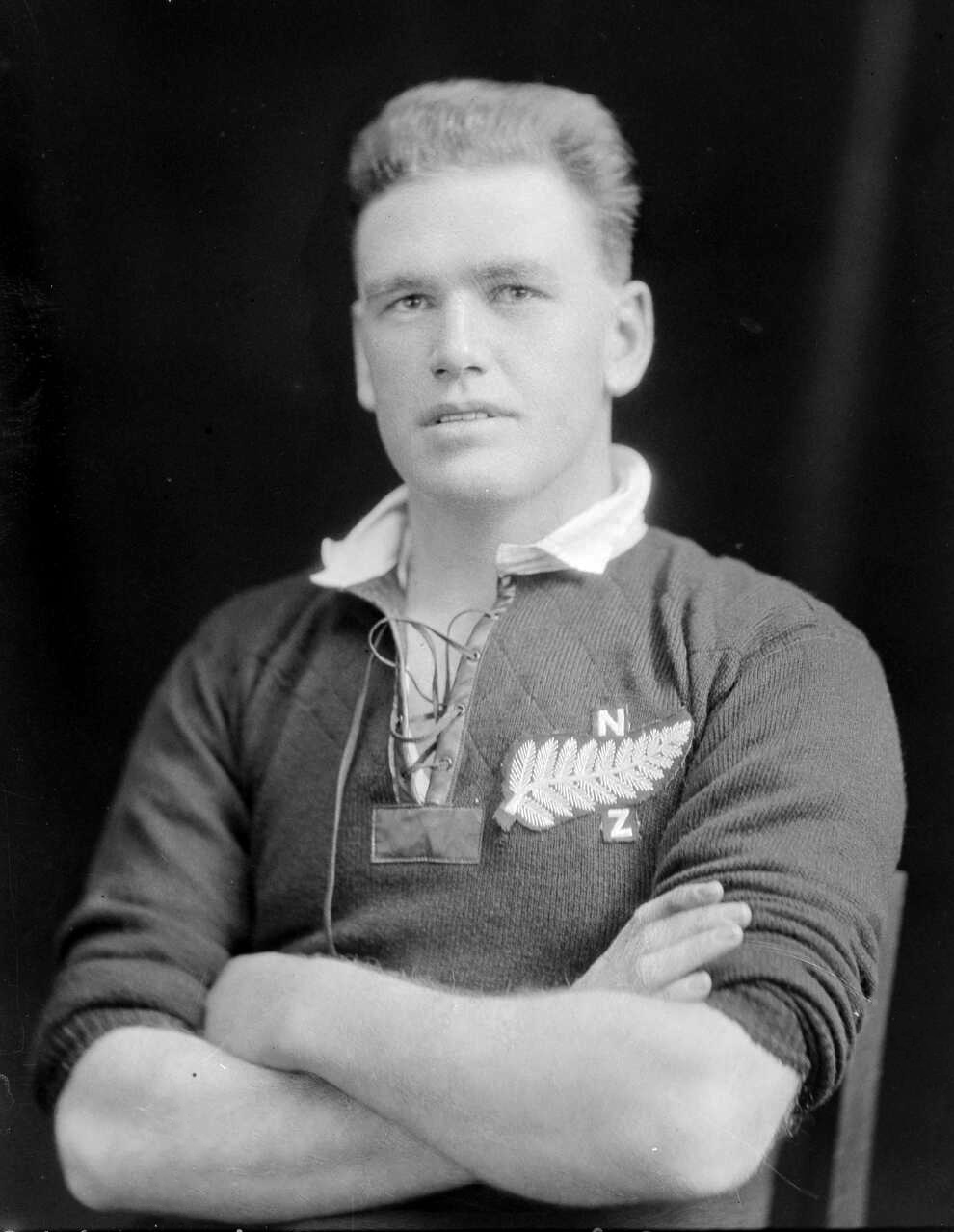
- Masters in 1924
- Born: Robert Read Masters; 19 October 1900 Picton, New Zealand
- Died: 24 August 1967 (aged 66) Christchurch, New Zealand
- Height: 1.83 m (6 ft 0 in)
- Weight: 93 kg (205 lb)

Rugby union career
- Position: Lock
Provincial / State sides
Years	Team	Apps	(Points)
1921–25	Canterbury		
International career
Years	Team	Apps	(Points)
1923–25	New Zealand	4	(0)

Robert Read Masters (19 October 1900 – 24 August 1967) was a New Zealand rugby union player and administrator. A lock, Masters represented Canterbury at a provincial level, and was a member of the New Zealand national side, the All Blacks, from 1923 to 1925. He played 31 matches for the All Blacks including four internationals, scoring six tries in all.

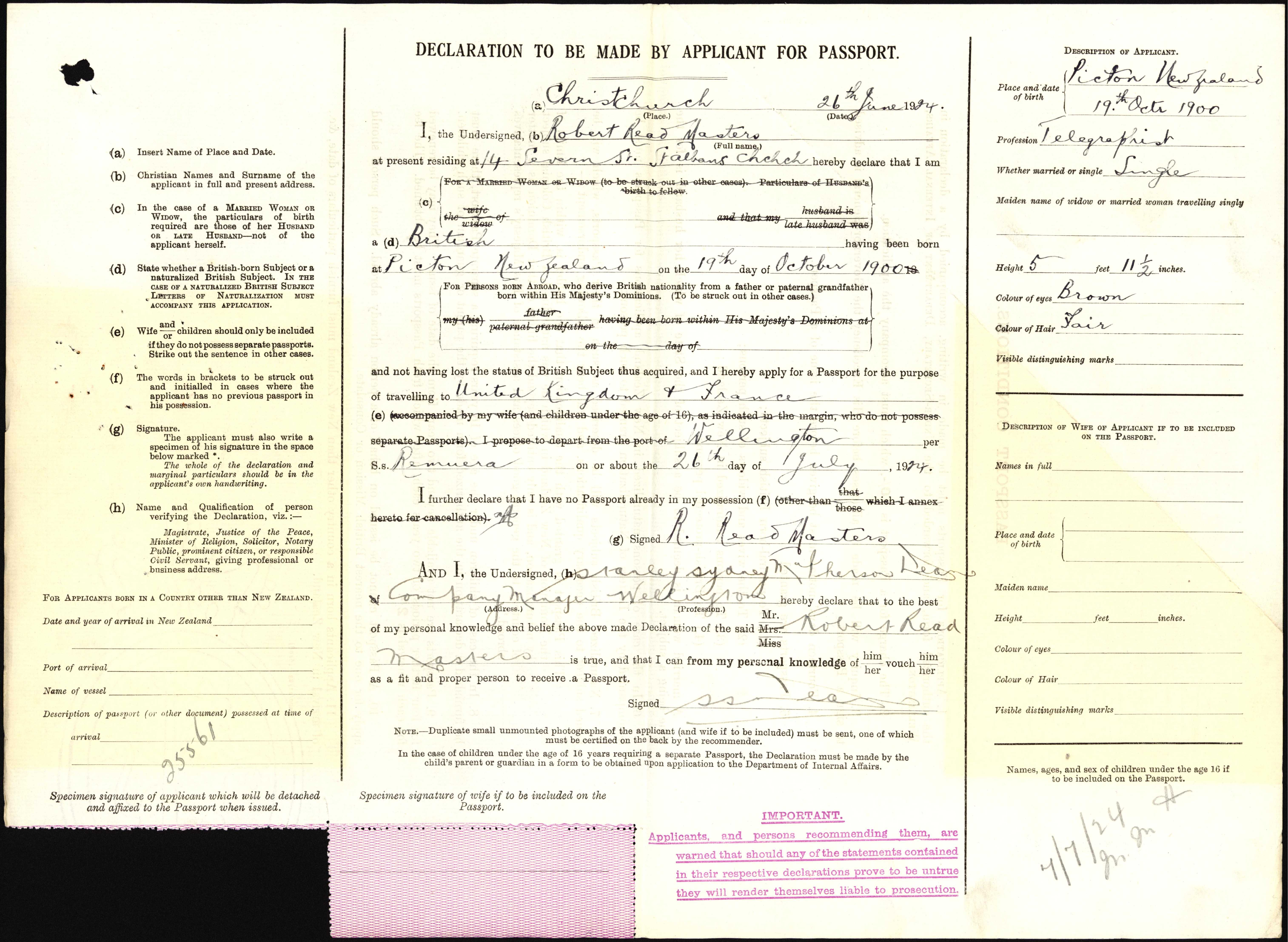
Robert Read Masters passport application file (1924)

After retiring as a player, Masters gave long service as an administrator. He was a member of the executive of the Canterbury Rugby Union from 1931 to 1955, serving as president between 1950 and 1952. He was president of the New Zealand Rugby Football Union in 1955. Masters was a Canterbury selector from 1928 to 1931, a South Island selector from 1928 to 1939 and 1947 to 1950, and an All Blacks selector in 1949. Between 1935 and 1967, Masters was an editor of the New Zealand Rugby Almanack with Arthur Carman and Arthur Swan.
