= List of British & Irish Lions players =

As of 2 August 2025, 888 players have made an appearance for the British and Irish Lions, a rugby union team selected from players eligible for any of the Home Nations – the national sides of England, Ireland, Scotland and Wales. The Lions generally select international players, but they can pick uncapped players available to any one of the four unions. Despite the Lions team name only being used officially since 1950, tours since 1910 by combined teams have been undertaken with the support of the four home unions, and these along with other tours since 1888 by combined teams have been recognised retrospectively as Lions tours. Eligible players in these tours are included in this list.

Unlike the majority of international sides, who will only recognise people that have participated in test matches against international opposition, the Lions consider an appearance for the team against any opposition sufficient to be recognised as a Lions player. This includes players who have appeared as a replacement during a Lions match, but not those who have only been named as part of a Lions touring squad or included as part of a match day squad as a replacement and not participated in a match. (Note: Jack Clowes is included on the list of Lions players despite not officially playing during any of their matches. Clowes was banned from playing as the 1888 team were due to depart in a row over professionalism, but travelled anyway and remained with the team throughout the tour.)

Ceremonial caps were presented for the first time in April 2018 to all players who had featured for the Lions up to that point. The caps were sent out to all 419 living players, and to the next-of-kin for the remaining 416 players that had represented the Lions up to this point.

The numbers are assigned in order of each player's first appearance. Where two or more players make their first appearance simultaneously (for example at the start of a match, or where multiple replacements take to the field at the same time), numbers are assigned in alphabetical order by surname.

== List ==
Number	Name	First tour	National team	Total matches	Test caps (Note: Per (Thomas;Thomas 2013, p443-446) matches against the New Zealand, Australia and South Africa national teams since 1891 have been considered test matches. Other matches against international opposition were generally not awarded test status, including the tours to Argentina and the 1989 match against France. The only exception is the match against Argentina in 2005, which was considered a test match with caps being awarded.) (Note: The status of the 2021 match against Japan was not decided before the game took place and will instead be determined after the tour to South Africa is complete. Currently, it is treated as a tour match and is not included in the test caps or points totals.)	Total points	Test points
1	Jack Anderton	1888	Uncapped				
2	Tom Banks	1888	Uncapped				
3	Walter Bumby	1888	Uncapped				
4	Bob Burnet	1888	Uncapped				
5	Harry Eagles	1888	Uncapped				
6	Tommy Haslam	1888	Uncapped				
7	Tom Kent	1888	England				
8	Alex Laing	1888	Uncapped				
9	Charlie Mathers	1888	Uncapped				
10	Johnny Nolan	1888	Uncapped				
11	Robert Seddon	1888	England				
12	Harry Speakman	1888	Uncapped				
13	Andrew Stoddart	1888	England				
14	Willie Thomas	1888	Wales				
15	Sam Williams	1888	Uncapped				
16	Arthur Paul	1888	Uncapped				
17	Angus Stuart	1888	Uncapped				
18	Willie Burnet	1888	Uncapped				
19	A. P. Penketh	1888	Uncapped				
20	Herbert Brooks	1888	Uncapped				
21	John Smith	1888	Uncapped				
22	David Macswaine	1888	Uncapped				
23	Thomas Bryce	1888	Uncapped				
24	Deacon Wadsworth	1888	Uncapped				
25	Jack Clowes	1888	Uncapped	0	0	0	0
26	Randolph Aston	1891	England				
27	William Bromet	1891	England				
28	Paul Clauss	1891	Scotland				
29	John Harding Gould	1891	Uncapped				
30	Johnny Hammond	1891	Uncapped				
31	Froude Hancock	1891	England				
32	Bill Maclagan	1891	Scotland				
33	Robert MacMillan	1891	Scotland				
34	William Grant Mitchell	1891	England				
35	Arthur Rotherham	1891	England				
36	Clement Pearson Simpson	1891	Uncapped				
37	Robert Thompson	1891	Uncapped				
38	William Henry Thorman	1891	Uncapped				
39	Thomas Sherren Whittaker	1891	Uncapped				
40	William Wotherspoon	1891	Scotland				
41	Edward Bromet	1891	Uncapped				
42	Howard Marshall	1891	England				
43	Edwin Mayfield	1891	Uncapped				
44	Walter Jesse Jackson	1891	England				
45	Bertwine Roscoe	1891	Uncapped				
46	Aubone Surtees	1891	Uncapped				
47	Sydney Pyman Bell	1896	Uncapped				
48	Cecil Boyd	1896	Ireland				
49	Lawrence Bulger	1896	Ireland				
50	Fred Byrne	1896	England				
51	Walter Carey	1896	Uncapped				
52	Andrew Clinch	1896	Ireland				
53	Thomas Crean	1896	Ireland				
54	Robert Johnston	1896	Ireland				
55	Osbert Mackie	1896	England				
56	James Magee	1896	Ireland				
57	Charles Robinson	1896	Uncapped				
58	Jim Sealy	1896	Ireland				
59	Alexander Todd	1896	England				
60	Louis Magee	1896	Ireland				
61	Arthur Meares	1896	Ireland				
62	William Mortimer	1896	England				
63	Matthew Mullineux	1896	Uncapped				
64	Cuth Mullins	1896	Uncapped				
65	George Lee	1896	Uncapped				
66	Charlie Adamson	1899	Uncapped				
67	Alan Ayre-Smith	1899	Uncapped				
68	Frederick Belson	1899	Uncapped				
69	Alf Bucher	1899	Scotland				
70	Gerry Doran	1899	Ireland				
71	George Ralph Gibson	1899	England				
72	Hugh Gray	1899	Uncapped				
73	Wallace Jarman	1899	England				
74	Esmond Martelli	1899	Uncapped				
75	Tom McGown	1899	Ireland				
76	Gwyn Nicholls	1899	Wales				
77	Frank Stout	1899	England				
78	Charles Thompson	1899	Uncapped				
79	Alec Timms	1899	Scotland				
80	George Cookson	1899	Uncapped				
81	John Francomb	1899	Uncapped				
82	Guy Evers	1899	Uncapped				
83	William Judkins	1899	Uncapped				
84	Elliot Nicholson	1899	England				
85	Blair Swannell	1899	Australia (Note: Blair Swannell and Tom Richards played for the Lions and an international side other than the four home unions. Swannell played for the Lions in 1899 and 1904 and then later settled in Australia where he gained his cap in 1905. Richards was born in Australia and had been capped prior to his participation on the 1910 Lions tour. At the time of being selected for the Lions, Richards was playing rugby for Bristol RFC in England.)				
86	David Bedell-Sivright	1903	Scotland				
87	Gilbert Collett	1903	Uncapped				
88	Ian Davidson	1903	Ireland	13	1	22	0
89	Thomas Gibson	1903	England				
90	Jimmy Gillespie	1903	Scotland				
91	Edward Harrison	1903	Uncapped				
92	Alfred Hind	1903	England				
93	Mark Morrison	1903	Scotland				
94	Robert Neill	1903	Scotland				
95	Bill Scott	1903	Scotland				
96	Reg Skrimshire	1903	Wales				
97	Alfred Tedford	1903	Ireland				
98	James Wallace	1903	Ireland				
99	Joseph Wallace	1903	Ireland				
100	Edward Walker	1903	Uncapped				
101	William Cave	1903	England				
102	Pat Hancock	1903	England				
103	Louis Greig	1903	Scotland				
104	Robbie Smyth	1903	Ireland				
105	J. C. Hosack	1903	Uncapped				
106	Sid Bevan	1904	Wales				
107	Percy Bush	1904	Wales				
108	Sydney Crowther	1904	Uncapped				
109	Reg Edwards	1904	Ireland				
110	Rhys Gabe	1904	Wales				
111	Arthur Harding	1904	Wales				
112	Frank Hulme	1904	England				
113	Willie Llewellyn	1904	Wales				
114	Teddy Morgan	1904	Wales				
115	Arthur O'Brien	1904	Uncapped				
116	Stuart Saunders	1904	Uncapped				
117	Chris Stanger-Leathes	1904	England				
118	David Trail	1904	Uncapped				
119	Pat McEvedy	1904	Uncapped				
120	Charlie Patterson	1904	Uncapped				
121	John Sharland	1904	Uncapped				
122	Tommy Vile	1904	Wales				
123	Denys Dobson	1904	England				
124	Fred Jowett	1904	Wales				
125	Ron Rogers	1904	Uncapped				
126	John Fisher	1904	Uncapped				
127	Burnett Massey	1904	Uncapped				
128	James Davey	1908	England				
129	Robert Dibble	1908	England				
130	Reggie Gibbs	1908	Wales				
131	John Jackett	1908	England				
132	Jack Jones	1908	Wales				
133	Gerald Kyrke	1908	Uncapped				
134	Herbert Laxon	1908	Uncapped				
135	Edgar Morgan	1908	Wales				
136	William Oldham	1908	England				
137	John Ritson	1908	England				
138	Tom Smith	1908	Uncapped				
139	Jack Williams	1908	Wales				
140	Johnny Williams	1908	Wales				
141	Percy Down	1908	England				
142	John Dyke	1908	Wales				
143	Herbert Archer	1908	England				
144	Frederick Chapman	1908	England				
145	Rowland Griffiths	1908	Uncapped				
146	Fred Jackson	1908	Uncapped				
147	Henry Vassall	1908	England				
148	Gerald L. Williams	1908	Uncapped				
149	Guy Hind	1908	England				
150	Tuan Jones	1908	Wales				
151	William Morgan	1908	Wales				
152	Len Thomas	1908	Uncapped				
153	Robert Green	1908	Uncapped				
154	John Ashby	1910	Uncapped				
155	Barrie Bennetts	1910	England				
156	Percy Diggle	1910	Uncapped				
157	Edward Fuller	1910	Uncapped				
158	Robin Harrison	1910	Uncapped				
159	Anthony Henniker-Gotley	1910	England				
160	Ernest Somers Holmwood	1910	Uncapped				
161	Walter Huntingford	1910	Uncapped				
162	Harold Monks	1910	Uncapped				
163	Alex Palmer	1910	England				
164	John Raphael	1910	England				
165	Whalley Stranach	1910	Uncapped				
166	Peter Strang	1910	Uncapped				
167	Martin Tweed	1910	Uncapped				
168	Horace Ward	1910	Uncapped				
169	William Fraser	1910	Uncapped				
170	Stanley Smith	1910	Uncapped				
171	Henry Fraser	1910	Uncapped				
172	Robert Waddell	1910	Uncapped				
173	Henry Whitehead	1910	Uncapped				
174	Mel Baker	1910	Wales				
175	George Isherwood	1910	Uncapped				
176	Harry Jarman	1910	Wales				
177	Arthur McClinton	1910	Ireland				
178	Maurice Neale	1910	England				
179	Charles Pillman	1910	England				
180	Oliver Piper	1910	Ireland				
181	William Robertson	1910	Uncapped				
182	Dyne Smith	1910	England				
183	Tommy Smyth	1910	Ireland				
184	Jack Spoors	1910	Uncapped				
185	Robert Stevenson	1910	Scotland				
186	Phil Waller	1910	Wales				
187	Stanley Williams	1910	England				
188	Frank Handford	1910	England				
189	Reg Plummer	1910	Wales				
190	Ken Wood	1910	Uncapped				
191	Alexander Foster	1910	Ireland				
192	William Tyrell	1910	Ireland				
193	Charles Timms	1910	Uncapped				
194	Edward Crean	1910	Uncapped				
195	Tom Richards	1910	Australia	12	2	3	0
196	Noel Humphreys	1910	Uncapped				
197	William Ashby	1910	Uncapped				
198	Eric Milroy	1910	Scotland				
199	Jim Webb	1910	Wales				
200	Freddie Blakiston	1924	England				
201	Ronald Cove-Smith	1924	England				
202	Dan Drysdale	1924	Scotland				
203	Stan Harris	1924	England				
204	Kelvin Hendrie	1924	Scotland				
205	Tom Holliday	1924	England				
206	Bob Howie	1924	Scotland				
207	Roy Kinnear	1924	Scotland				
208	Neil MacPherson	1924	Scotland				
209	Douglas Marsden-Jones	1924	Wales				
210	Jim McVicker	1924	Ireland				
211	Andrew Ross	1924	Scotland				
212	Herbert Waddell	1924	Scotland				
213	Bill Wallace	1924	Uncapped				
214	Arthur Young	1924	England				
215	James Bordass	1924	Uncapped				
216	Jammie Clinch	1924	Ireland				
217	Doug Davies	1924	Scotland				
218	Vince Griffiths	1924	Wales				
219	Rowe Harding	1924	Wales				
220	William Roche	1924	Ireland				
221	Ian Smith	1924	Scotland				
222	Tom Voyce	1924	England	12	2	37	6
223	Michael Bradley	1924	Ireland	13	0	3	0
224	Norman Brand	1924	Ireland				
225	Reg Maxwell	1924	Uncapped				
226	Herbert Whitley	1924	England				
227	Harold Davies	1924	Wales				
228	Robert Henderson	1924	Scotland				
229	Bill Cunningham	1924	Ireland	3	1	7	3
230	Carl Aarvold	1927	England				
231	Arthur Allen	1927	Uncapped				
232	James Farrell	1927	Ireland				
233	Thomas Gubb	1927	Uncapped				
234	Arthur Hamilton-Smythe	1927	Uncapped				
235	Ernie Hammett	1927	England				
236	Douglas Law	1927	England				
237	George McIlwaine	1927	Uncapped				
238	Charles Payne	1927	Ireland				
239	Theodore Pike	1927	Ireland				
240	Wilf Sobey	1927	England				
241	Edward Taylor	1927	Scotland	7	3	33	9
242	Roger Wakefield	1927	Uncapped				
243	Jack Wallens	1927	England				
244	Guy Wilson	1927	England				
245	Granville Coghlan	1927	Uncapped				
246	Peter Douty	1927	Scotland				
247	Robert Kelly	1927	Scotland				
248	Jules Malfroy	1927	Uncapped				
249	David MacMyn	1927	Scotland				
250	Roger Spong	1927	England				
251	Donald Troup	1927	Uncapped				
252	Eric Coley	1927	England				
253	George Beamish	1930	Ireland				
254	Brian Black	1930	England				
255	Gordon Bonner	1930	Uncapped				
256	Harry Bowcott	1930	Wales				
257	Ivor Jones	1930	Wales				
258	Douglas Kendrew	1930	England				
259	Tom Knowles	1930	England				
260	Sam Martindale	1930	England				
261	Jack Morley	1930	Wales				
262	Tony Novis	1930	England				
263	Henry Rew	1930	England				
264	Willie Welsh	1930	Scotland				
265	John Hodgson	1930	England				
266	Roy Jennings	1930	Uncapped				
267	Paul Murray	1930	Ireland				
268	Henry O'Hara O'Neill	1930	Ireland				
269	Dai Parker	1930	Wales				
270	Howard Poole	1930	Uncapped				
271	Jim Reeve	1930	England				
272	Harry Wilkinson	1930	England				
273	Mike Dunne	1930	Ireland				
274	Harold Jones	1930	Uncapped				
275	Tommy Jones-Davies	1930	Wales				
256	Doug Prentice	1930	England				
252	Jack Bassett	1930	Wales				
278	Charles Beamish	1936	Ireland				
279	Vesey Boyle	1936	Ireland				
280	John Brett	1936	Uncapped				
281	Owen Chadwick	1936	Uncapped				
282	Pop Dunkley	1936	England				
283	Bernard Gadney	1936	England				
284	Peter Hobbs	1936	Uncapped				
285	Fred Huskisson	1936	England				
286	Denis Pratten	1936	Uncapped				
287	Wilson Shaw	1936	Scotland				
288	John Tallent	1936	England				
289	Jim Unwin	1936	England				
290	Harold Uren	1936	Uncapped				
291	Bill Weston	1936	England				
292	John A'Bear	1936	Uncapped				
293	Jock Waters	1936	Scotland				
294	George Hancock	1936	England				
295	John Moll	1936	Uncapped				
296	Alexander Obolensky	1936	England				
297	Robin Prescott	1936	England				
298	Peter Hordern	1936	England				
299	Robert Alexander	1938	Ireland				
300	Bill Clement	1938	Wales				
301	Laurie Duff	1938	Scotland				
302	Jimmy Giles	1938	England				
303	Bob Graves	1938	Ireland				
304	Vivian Jenkins	1938	Wales				
305	Roy Leyland	1938	England				
306	Duncan Macrae	1938	Scotland				
307	Paddy Mayne	1938	Ireland				
308	Jeff Reynolds	1938	England				
309	Russell Taylor	1938	Wales				
310	Bunner Travers	1938	Wales				
311	Sam Walker	1938	Ireland				
312	Stanley Couchman	1938	Uncapped				
313	George Cromey	1938	Ireland				
314	Bill Howard	1938	Uncapped				
315	Elvet Jones	1938	Wales				
316	Harry McKibbin	1938	Ireland				
317	George Morgan	1938	Ireland				
318	Eddie Morgan	1938	Wales				
319	Ivor Williams	1938	Uncapped				
320	Charles Grieve	1938	Scotland				
321	Beef Dancer	1938	Uncapped				
322	Arthur Purchas	1938	Uncapped				
323	Haydn Tanner	1938	Wales				
324	Basil Nicholson	1938	England				
325	Grahame Budge	1950	Scotland	14	1	0	0
326	Billy Cleaver	1950	Wales	15	3	21	0
327	Tom Clifford	1950	Ireland	20	5	14	0
328	Don Hayward	1950	Wales	18	3	3	0
329	Mick Lane	1950	Ireland	11	2	15	0
330	Ranald Macdonald	1950	Scotland	14	2	30	3
331	Jack Matthews	1950	Wales	20	6	18	0
332	Jim McCarthy	1950	Ireland	12	0	12	0
333	Karl Mullen	1950	Ireland	17	3	0	0
334	Jimmy Nelson	1950	Ireland	19	4	12	6
335	Ivor Preece	1950	England	11	1	15	0
336	Gordon Rimmer	1950	England	8	1	0	0
337	Vic Roberts	1950	England	12	0	21	0
338	Rees Stephens	1950	Wales	14	2	3	0
339	Malcolm Thomas	1950	Wales	32	4	152	0
340	Angus Black	1950	Scotland	10	2	0	0
341	Cliff Davies	1950	Wales	12	1	6	0
342	Bob Evans	1950	Wales	17	6	6	0
343	Roy John	1950	Wales	22	6	6	3
344	Ken Jones	1950	Wales	17	3	48	6
345	Peter Kininmonth	1950	Scotland	16	3	0	0
346	Jack Kyle	1950	Ireland	20	6	21	6
347	Bill McKay	1950	Ireland	16	6	30	0
348	George Norton	1950	Ireland	3	0	9	0
349	John Robins	1950	Wales	17	5	39	10
350	Dai Davies	1950	Wales	14	3	0	0
351	Noel Henderson	1950	Ireland	15	1	24	0
352	Rex Willis	1950	Wales	13	3	3	0
353	Bleddyn Williams	1950	Wales	21	5	39	3
354	Lewis Jones	1950	Wales	12	3	112	26
355	Doug Smith	1950	Scotland	5	1	11	0
356	Jeff Butterfield	1955	England	21	4	30	12
357	Phil Davies	1955	England	14	3	24	0
358	Jim Greenwood	1955	Scotland	16	4	9	6
359	Reg Higgins	1955	England	9	1	3	0
360	Trevor Lloyd	1955	Wales	6	0	8	0
361	Bryn Meredith	1955	Wales	14	8	27	3
362	Courtney Meredith	1955	Wales	14	4	0	0
363	Cliff Morgan	1955	Wales	15	4	21	3
364	Cecil Pedlow	1955	Ireland	13	2	58	5
365	Arthur Smith	1955	Scotland	19	3	66	0
366	Alun Thomas	1955	Wales	5	0	15	0
367	Robin Thompson	1955	Ireland	15	3	3	0
368	Rhys Williams	1955	Wales	38	10	3	0
369	Billy Williams	1955	Wales	17	4	0	0
370	Dyson Wilson	1955	England	15	0	9	0
371	Dickie Jeeps	1955	England	42	13	13	0
372	Hugh McLeod	1955	Scotland	34	6	7	0
373	Haydn Morris	1955	Wales	8	0	27	0
374	Pat Quinn	1955	England	12	0	21	0
375	Russell Robins	1955	Wales	18	4	6	3
376	Robin Roe	1955	Ireland	11	0	3	0
377	Frank Sykes	1955	England	14	0	27	0
378	Doug Baker	1955	England	16	2	21	3
379	Angus Cameron	1955	Scotland	9	2	44	11
380	Tom Elliot	1955	Scotland	8	0	0	0
381	Ernie Michie	1955	Scotland	11	0	3	0
382	Tony O'Reilly	1955	Ireland	38	10	114	18
383	Tom Reid	1955	Ireland	12	2	3	0
384	Johnny Williams	1955	England	8	0	15	0
385	Gareth Griffiths	1955	Wales	12	3	9	0
386	Clem Thomas	1955	Wales	10	2	3	0
387	Ned Ashcroft	1959	England	18	2	6	0
388	Ronnie Dawson	1959	Ireland	18	6	6	3
389	David Hewitt	1959	Ireland	25	6	118	16
390	Peter Jackson	1959	England	18	5	57	6
391	David Marques	1959	England	19	2	3	0
392	Haydn Morgan	1959	Wales	34	4	35	5
393	Bev Risman	1959	England	14	4	62	10
394	Ken Scotland	1959	Scotland	22	5	72	8
395	Ken Smith	1959	Scotland	17	4	12	3
396	Gordon Wood	1959	Ireland	15	2	6	0
397	John Young	1959	England	14	1	42	3
398	Niall Brophy	1959	Ireland	9	2	15	0
399	Terry Davies	1959	Wales	15	2	107	5
400	Roddy Evans	1959	Wales	18	4	3	0
401	John Faull	1959	Wales	20	4	60	5
402	Syd Millar	1959	Ireland	44	9	9	0
403	Bill Mulcahy	1959	Ireland	32	6	12	0
404	Noel Murphy	1959	Ireland	37	8	39	3
405	Malcolm Price	1959	Wales	19	5	42	12
406	Ray Prosser	1959	Wales	13	1	3	0
407	Stan Coughtrie	1959	Scotland	2	0	3	0
408	Mick English	1959	Ireland	2	0	0	0
409	Gordon Waddell	1959	Scotland	22	2	41	0
410	Andy Mulligan	1959	Ireland	13	1	0	0
411	Bill Patterson	1959	England	11	1	24	0
412	Phil Horrocks-Taylor	1959	England	5	1	9	0
413	Mike Campbell-Lamerton	1962	Scotland	42	8	9	3
414	Stan Hodgson	1962	England	1	0	3	0
415	Ken Jones	1962	Wales	29	6	36	9
416	Kingsley Jones	1962	Wales	15	4	0	0
417	David Nash	1962	Wales	2	0	3	0
418	Anthony O'Connor	1962	Wales	10	0	0	0
419	Alun Pask	1962	Wales	36	8	20	0
420	Budge Rogers	1962	England	12	2	6	0
421	David Rollo	1962	Scotland	13	0	0	0
422	Richard Sharp	1962	England	11	2	45	3
423	Mike Weston	1962	England	31	6	69	0
424	John Willcox	1962	England	15	3	67	5
425	Ronnie Cowan	1962	Scotland	10	1	15	3
426	John Dee	1962	England	12	0	9	0
427	Raymond Hunter	1962	Ireland	12	0	16	0
428	Tom Kiernan	1962	Ireland	23	5	96	35
429	Keith Rowlands	1962	Wales	18	3	6	3
430	Peter Wright	1962	England	8	0	0	0
431	John Douglas	1962	Scotland	10	0	3	0
432	Bert Godwin	1962	England	9	0	0	0
433	Willie John McBride	1962	Ireland	70	17	13	3
434	Dewi Bebb	1962	Wales	32	8	48	3
435	John Brown	1962	Uncapped	5	0	9	0
436	Glyn Davidge	1962	Wales	3	0	0	0
437	Sandy Hinshelwood	1966	Scotland	28	3	54	3
438	Frank Laidlaw	1966	Scotland	28	2	0	0
439	Allan Lewis	1966	Wales	18	3	3	0
440	Howard Norris	1966	Wales	17	3	6	0
441	Brian Price	1966	Wales	19	4	3	0
442	Don Rutherford	1966	England	10	1	55	5
443	Jim Telfer	1966	Scotland	34	8	18	0
444	Jerry Walsh	1966	Ireland	4	0	9	0
445	Stuart Watkins	1966	Wales	13	3	15	0
446	Denzil Williams	1966	Wales	21	5	3	0
447	Derrick Grant	1966	Scotland	10	0	0	0
448	Ken Kennedy	1966	Ireland	28	4	11	3
449	Ronnie Lamont	1966	Ireland	15	4	21	3
450	Colin McFadyean	1966	England	23	4	29	3
451	Ray McLoughlin	1966	Ireland	22	3	6	3
452	David Powell	1966	England	14	0	0	0
453	Keith Savage	1966	England	23	4	33	0
454	Delme Thomas	1966	Wales	44	6	9	0
455	David Watkins	1966	Wales	21	6	43	12
456	Stewart Wilson	1966	Scotland	21	5	90	30
457	Roger Young	1966	Ireland	26	4	9	0
458	Gareth Prothero	1966	Wales	9	0	0	0
459	Barry Bresnihan	1966	Ireland	26	3	21	0
460	Mike Gibson	1966	Ireland	68	12	119	0
461	Terry Price	1966	Wales	3	0	17	0
462	Mike Coulman	1968	England	10	1	3	0
463	Gerald Davies	1968	Wales	19	5	39	9
464	Mick Doyle	1968	Ireland	11	1	6	0
465	Gareth Edwards	1968	Wales	38	10	58	3
466	Tony Horton	1968	England	12	3	0	0
467	Keri Jones	1968	Wales	6	0	3	0
468	Maurice Richards	1968	Wales	11	3	15	0
469	Bob Taylor	1968	England	14	4	6	0
470	Jock Turner	1968	Scotland	11	4	15	0
471	Jeff Young	1968	Wales	9	1	0	0
472	Rodger Arneil	1968	Scotland	17	4	0	0
473	Barry John	1968	Wales	21	5	188	30
474	John Pullin	1968	England	27	7	0	0
475	Peter Stagg	1968	Scotland	11	3	0	0
476	John Taylor	1968	Wales	20	4	18	0
477	Bob Hiller	1968	England	19	0	214	0
478	Peter Larter	1968	England	12	1	0	0
479	Billy Raybould	1968	Wales	7	0	6	0
480	Keith Jarrett	1968	Wales	5	0	18	0
481	John O'Shea	1968	Wales	8	1	6	0
482	Ken Goodall	1968	Ireland	1	0	3	0
483	Bryan West	1968	England	2	0	0	0
484	Gordon Connell	1968	Scotland	3	1	0	0
485	Alastair Biggar	1971	Scotland	10	0	24	0
486	Gordon Brown	1971	Scotland	42	8	36	8
487	John Dawes	1971	Wales	19	4	18	0
488	Peter Dixon	1971	England	15	3	6	3
489	David Duckham	1971	England	17	3	33	0
490	Chico Hopkins	1971	Wales	11	1	3	0
491	Sean Lynch	1971	Ireland	15	4	0	0
492	Ian McLauchlan	1971	Scotland	30	8	3	3
493	Derek Quinnell	1971	Wales	34	5	11	0
494	Fergus Slattery	1971	Ireland	25	4	31	0
495	John Spencer	1971	England	10	0	12	0
496	John Bevan	1971	Wales	18	1	54	0
497	Sandy Carmichael	1971	Scotland	16	0	3	0
498	Mervyn Davies	1971	Wales	27	8	29	0
499	Mike Hipwell	1971	Ireland	6	0	0	0
500	Arthur Lewis	1971	Wales	10	0	6	0
501	Mike Roberts	1971	Wales	11	0	0	0
502	J. P. R. Williams	1971	Wales	29	8	28	3
503	Chris Rea	1971	Scotland	10	0	9	0
504	Stack Stevens	1971	England	6	0	0	0
505	Geoff Evans	1971	Wales	6	0	3	0
506	Phil Bennett	1974	Wales	27	8	236	44
507	Roy Bergiers	1974	Wales	10	0	8	0
508	Tommy David	1974	Wales	9	0	20	0
509	Ian McGeechan	1974	Scotland	31	8	19	3
510	John Moloney	1974	Ireland	8	0	12	0
511	Tony Neary	1974	England	23	1	20	0
512	Clive Rees	1974	Wales	6	0	12	0
513	Andy Ripley	1974	England	8	0	20	0
514	William Steele	1974	Scotland	9	2	28	0
515	Bobby Windsor	1974	Wales	26	5	4	0
516	Fran Cotton	1974	England	35	7	0	0
517	Geoff Evans	1974	England	8	0	16	0
518	Andy Irvine	1974	Scotland	43	9	281	28
519	Richard Milliken	1974	Ireland	13	4	24	4
520	Alan Old	1974	England	4	0	59	0
521	Chris Ralston	1974	England	13	1	0	0
522	Roger Uttley	1974	England	16	4	8	4
523	J. J. Williams	1974	Wales	26	7	88	20
524	Tom Grace	1974	Ireland	11	0	52	0
525	Mike Burton	1974	England	8	0	0	0
526	Stewart McKinney	1974	Ireland	8	0	3	0
527	Alan Morley	1974	England	2	0	4	0
528	David Burcher	1977	Wales	15	1	20	0
529	Terry Cobner	1977	Wales	11	3	12	0
530	Trefor Evans	1977	Wales	14	1	0	0
531	Bruce Hay	1977	Scotland	22	3	28	4
532	Nigel Horton	1977	England	4	0	0	0
533	Moss Keane	1977	Ireland	12	1	0	0
534	Philip Orr	1977	Ireland	17	1	4	0
535	Graham Price	1977	Wales	38	12	8	4
536	Peter Squires	1977	England	10	1	20	0
537	Peter Wheeler	1977	England	24	7	8	0
538	Brynmor Williams	1977	Wales	12	3	12	0
539	Willie Duggan	1977	Ireland	16	4	8	4
540	John Bevan	1977	Wales	12	0	4	0
541	Gareth Evans	1977	Wales	19	3	28	0
542	Steve Fenwick	1977	Wales	13	4	19	0
543	Allan Martin	1977	Wales	22	1	6	0
544	Dougie Morgan	1977	Scotland	16	2	98	9
545	Clive Williams	1977	Wales	21	4	8	4
546	Jeff Squire	1977	Wales	32	6	24	0
547	Elgan Rees	1977	Wales	19	1	44	0
548	Bill Beaumont	1977	England	21	7	8	0
549	Charlie Faulkner	1977	Wales	3	0	0	0
550	Alun Lewis	1977	Uncapped	3	0	0	0
551	John Beattie	1980	Scotland	18	1	20	0
552	Gareth Davies	1980	Wales	4	1	34	8
553	Ray Gravell	1980	Wales	11	4	4	4
554	Terry Holmes	1980	Wales	8	1	16	0
555	Stuart Lane	1980	Wales	1	0	0	0
556	Peter Morgan	1980	Wales	7	0	7	0
557	Mike Slemen	1980	England	5	1	25	0
558	Jim Renwick	1980	Scotland	11	1	17	0
559	Phil Blakeway	1980	England	1	0	0	0
560	John Carleton	1980	England	21	6	48	0
561	Maurice Colclough	1980	England	22	8	4	0
562	Rodney O'Donnell	1980	Ireland	6	1	3	0
563	John O'Driscoll	1980	Ireland	19	6	16	8
564	Colin Patterson	1980	Ireland	10	3	4	0
565	Alan Phillips	1980	Wales	7	0	0	0
566	David Richards	1980	Wales	7	1	4	0
567	Alan Tomes	1980	Scotland	7	0	4	0
568	Colm Tucker	1980	Ireland	9	2	4	0
569	Clive Woodward	1980	England	18	2	56	0
570	Ollie Campbell	1980	Ireland	18	7	184	26
571	Gareth Williams	1980	Wales	6	0	8	0
572	Ian Stephens	1980	Wales	9	1	4	0
573	Tony Ward	1980	Ireland	5	1	48	18
574	John Robbie	1980	Ireland	7	1	7	0
575	Paul Dodge	1980	England	5	2	4	0
576	Rob Ackerman	1983	Wales	10	2	4	0
577	Steve Boyle	1983	England	6	0	0	0
578	Gwyn Evans	1983	Wales	12	2	21	3
579	Ciaran Fitzgerald	1983	Ireland	11	4	0	0
580	Dusty Hare	1983	England	6	0	88	0
581	Staff Jones	1983	Wales	13	3	0	0
582	Mike Kiernan	1983	Ireland	10	3	11	0
583	Roy Laidlaw	1983	Scotland	14	4	8	0
584	Iain Milne	1983	Scotland	8	0	4	0
585	Bob Norster	1983	Wales	12	3	4	0
586	Trevor Ringland	1983	Ireland	10	1	20	0
587	John Rutherford	1983	Scotland	11	1	23	4
588	Peter Winterbottom	1983	England	19	7	4	0
589	Steve Bainbridge	1983	England	11	2	0	0
590	Roger Baird	1983	Scotland	11	4	24	4
591	Jim Calder	1983	Scotland	7	1	12	0
592	David Irwin	1983	Ireland	11	3	24	0
593	Hugo MacNeill	1983	Ireland	9	3	8	0
594	Colin Deans	1983	Scotland	8	0	0	0
595	Iain Paxton	1983	Scotland	10	4	16	0
596	Nick Jeavons	1983	England	6	0	0	0
597	Nigel Melville	1983	England	2	0	8	0
598	Donal Lenihan	1983	Ireland	6	0	0	0
599	Gerry McLoughlin	1983	Ireland	2	0	0	0
600	Steve Smith	1983	England	2	0	0	0
601	Eddie Butler	1983	Wales	1	0	0	0
602	Nigel Carr	1986	Ireland	1	0	0	0
603	John Devereux	1986	Wales	6	0	8	0
604	Wade Dooley	1986	England	10	2	8	0
605	Des Fitzgerald	1986	Ireland	1	0	0	0
606	Gavin Hastings	1986	Scotland	18	6	192	66
607	John Jeffrey	1986	Scotland	6	0	16	0
608	Robert Jones	1986	Wales	15	3	9	0
609	Brendan Mullin	1986	Ireland	9	1	28	0
610	Rory Underwood	1986	England	17	6	31	5
611	Jeff Whitefoot	1986	Wales	1	0	0	0
612	Malcolm Dacey	1986	Wales	1	0	0	0
613	Finlay Calder	1989	Scotland	6	3	0	0
614	Paul Dean	1989	Ireland	1	0	0	0
615	Peter Dods	1989	Scotland	5	0	66	0
616	Ieuan Evans	1989	Wales	20	7	43	4
617	Scott Hastings	1989	Scotland	13	2	17	0
618	Brian Moore	1989	England	14	5	4	0
619	David Sole	1989	Scotland	8	3	4	0
620	Mike Teague	1989	England	14	3	5	0
621	Derek White	1989	Scotland	7	1	4	0
622	Dai Young	1989	Wales	18	3	10	0
623	Craig Chalmers	1989	Scotland	7	1	28	6
624	Paul Ackford	1989	England	9	3	0	0
625	Gary Armstrong	1989	Scotland	5	0	20	0
626	Gareth Chilcott	1989	England	5	0	4	0
627	Mike Griffiths	1989	Wales	7	0	0	0
628	Jeremy Guscott	1989	England	23	8	37	7
629	Chris Oti	1989	England	3	0	4	0
630	Dean Richards	1989	England	12	6	5	0
631	Andy Robinson	1989	England	7	0	8	0
632	Steve Smith	1989	Ireland	6	0	8	0
633	Mike Hall	1989	Wales	6	1	12	0
634	Rob Andrew	1989	England	14	5	47	11
635	Tony Clement	1989	Wales	9	0	17	0
636	Damian Cronin	1989	Scotland	7	0	5	0
637	David Egerton	1989	England	1	0	0	0
638	Phillip Matthews	1989	Ireland	1	0	0	0
639	Jeff Probyn	1989	England	1	0	0	0
640	Stuart Barnes	1993	England	8	0	33	0
641	Ben Clarke	1993	England	8	3	0	0
642	Mick Galwey	1993	Ireland	7	0	5	0
643	Ian Hunter	1993	England	1	0	0	0
644	Jason Leonard	1993	England	23	5	0	0
645	Andy Reed	1993	Scotland	6	1	5	0
646	Richard Webster	1993	Wales	7	0	10	0
647	Peter Wright	1993	Scotland	6	0	0	0
648	Paul Burnell	1993	Scotland	7	1	0	0
649	Martin Bayfield	1993	England	7	3	0	0
650	Will Carling	1993	England	7	1	8	0
651	Scott Gibbs	1993	Wales	15	5	15	5
652	Kenny Milne	1993	Scotland	8	1	0	0
653	Dewi Morris	1993	England	8	3	0	0
654	Nick Popplewell	1993	Ireland	7	3	0	0
655	Tony Underwood	1993	England	14	1	45	0
656	Richard Wallace	1993	Ireland	5	0	5	0
657	Vince Cunningham	1993	Ireland	3	0	10	0
658	Martin Johnson	1993	England	15	8	0	0
659	Andy Nicol	1993	Scotland	1	0	0	0
660	Nick Beal	1997	England	5	0	20	0
661	Lawrence Dallaglio	1997	England	10	3	5	0
662	Will Greenwood	1997	England	15	2	15	0
663	Richard Hill	1997	England	13	5	5	0
664	Rob Howley	1997	Wales	8	2	10	0
665	Neil Jenkins	1997	Wales	12	4	142	41
666	Scott Quinnell	1997	Wales	9	3	20	5
667	Simon Shaw	1997	England	19	2	10	0
668	Tom Smith	1997	Scotland	13	6	0	0
669	Gregor Townsend	1997	Scotland	6	2	13	0
670	Doddie Weir	1997	Scotland	3	0	5	0
671	Keith Wood	1997	Ireland	11	5	0	0
672	Barry Williams	1997	Wales	4	0	0	0
673	Jeremy Davidson	1997	Ireland	13	3	0	0
674	Neil Back	1997	England	16	5	25	5
675	Allan Bateman	1997	Wales	7	1	5	0
676	John Bentley	1997	England	8	2	35	0
677	Paul Greyson	1997	England	1	0	0	0
678	Austin Healey	1997	England	13	2	25	0
679	Eric Miller	1997	Ireland	5	1	0	0
680	Mark Regan	1997	England	6	1	10	0
681	Graham Rowntree	1997	England	12	3	5	0
682	Tim Stimpson	1997	England	7	1	111	0
683	Rob Wainwright	1997	Scotland	7	1	20	0
684	Alan Tait	1997	Scotland	6	2	10	5
685	Matt Dawson	1997	England	19	7	36	10
686	Paul Wallace	1997	Ireland	6	3	0	0
687	Tim Rodber	1997	England	5	2	0	0
688	Mike Catt	1997	England	7	1	13	0
689	Nigel Redman	1997	England	4	0	0	0
690	Tony Diprose	1997	England	2	0	0	0
691	Kyran Bracken	1997	England	1	0	5	0
692	Tony Stanger	1997	Scotland	1	0	0	0
693	Ben Cohen	2001	England	4	0	10	0
694	Danny Grewcock	2001	England	11	5	5	0
695	Dan Luger	2001	England	2	0	20	0
696	Darren Morris	2001	Wales	6	1	0	0
697	Brian O'Driscoll	2001	Ireland	18	8	45	5
698	Ronan O'Gara	2001	Ireland	16	2	124	0
699	Malcolm O'Kelly	2001	Ireland	4	0	5	0
700	Mark Taylor	2001	Wales	5	0	10	0
701	Phil Vickery	2001	England	13	5	0	0
702	Simon Taylor	2001	Scotland	1	0	5	0
703	Iain Balshaw	2001	England	8	3	10	0
704	Rob Henderson	2001	Ireland	6	3	20	0
705	Robin McBryde	2001	Wales	4	0	0	0
706	Colin Charvis	2001	Wales	6	2	15	0
707	Martin Corry	2001	England	16	7	10	0
708	Dafydd James	2001	Wales	7	3	15	5
709	Scott Murray	2001	Scotland	5	0	0	0
710	Matt Perry	2001	England	6	3	13	0
711	Jason Robinson	2001	England	11	5	55	10
712	Martyn Williams	2001	Wales	17	4	10	0
713	Gordon Bulloch	2001	Scotland	10	2	0	0
714	Jonny Wilkinson	2001	England	9	6	116	67
715	Tyrone Howe	2001	Ireland	1	0	0	0
716	David Wallace	2001	Ireland	9	3	5	0
717	Dorian West	2001	England	1	0	0	0
718	Shane Byrne	2005	Ireland	7	4	0	0
719	Gareth Cooper	2005	Wales	4	1	5	0
720	Gordon D'Arcy	2005	Ireland	10	1	10	0
721	John Hayes	2005	Ireland	7	2	0	0
722	Denis Hickie	2005	Ireland	5	1	0	0
723	Lewis Moody	2005	England	5	3	5	5
724	Geordan Murphy	2005	Ireland	7	2	15	0
725	Donncha O'Callaghan	2005	Ireland	12	4	0	0
726	Michael Owen	2005	Wales	7	1	0	0
727	Ollie Smith	2005	England	5	1	10	5
728	Shane Williams	2005	Wales	14	4	40	10
729	Chris Cusiter	2005	Scotland	6	1	0	0
730	Shane Horgan	2005	Ireland	8	4	5	0
731	Ben Kay	2005	England	5	2	0	0
732	Steve Thompson	2005	England	6	3	0	0
733	Julian White	2005	England	6	4	0	0
734	Mark Cueto	2005	England	5	1	15	0
735	Gavin Henson	2005	Wales	4	1	10	0
736	Gethin Jenkins	2005	Wales	11	5	5	0
737	Josh Lewsey	2005	England	6	3	10	0
738	Paul O'Connell	2005	Ireland	15	7	5	0
739	Dwayne Peel	2005	Wales	5	3	5	0
740	Tom Shanklin	2005	Wales	3	0	5	0
741	Matt Stevens	2005	England	12	0	0	0
742	Andrew Sheridan	2005	England	11	2	0	0
743	Charlie Hodgson	2005	England	4	0	53	0
744	Andy Titterrell	2005	England	3	0	0	0
745	Stephen Jones	2005	Wales	10	6	87	53
746	Simon Easterby	2005	Ireland	5	2	5	5
747	Gareth Thomas	2005	Wales	4	3	10	5
748	Ryan Jones	2005	Wales	4	3	5	0
749	Brent Cockbain	2005	Wales	2	0	0	0
750	Jason White	2005	Scotland	1	0	0	0
751	Mike Blair	2009	Scotland	3	0	0	0
752	Tommy Bowe	2009	Ireland	10	5	25	0
753	Lee Byrne	2009	Wales	4	1	10	0
754	Keith Earls	2009	Ireland	5	0	10	0
755	Adam Jones	2009	Wales	12	5	0	0
756	Matthew Rees	2009	Wales	8	3	0	0
757	Jamie Roberts	2009	Wales	9	3	15	5
758	Joe Worsley	2009	England	6	1	0	0
759	Riki Flutey	2009	England	6	1	0	0
760	Jamie Heaslip	2009	Ireland	12	5	10	0
761	Alun Wyn Jones	2009	Wales	25	12	10	0
762	Mike Phillips	2009	Wales	11	5	20	5
763	Lee Mears	2009	England	5	1	5	0
764	Tom Croft	2009	England	11	5	25	10
765	Nathan Hines	2009	Scotland	5	0	0	0
766	Rob Kearney	2009	Ireland	8	3	5	5
767	Ugo Monye	2009	England	6	2	25	5
768	Stephen Ferris	2009	Ireland	2	0	10	0
769	James Hook	2009	Wales	6	0	35	0
770	Harry Ellis	2009	England	5	1	0	0
771	Andy Powell	2009	Wales	5	0	0	0
772	Ross Ford	2009	Scotland	6	1	0	0
773	Euan Murray	2009	Scotland	4	0	0	0
774	Luke Fitzgerald	2009	Ireland	5	1	5	0
775	Leigh Halfpenny	2009	Wales	11	4	145	49
776	Tim Payne	2009	England	1	0	0	0
777	Alex Cuthbert	2013	Wales	4	1	20	5
778	Jonathan Davies	2013	Wales	12	6	15	0
779	Taulupe Faletau	2013	Wales	18	5	5	5
780	Owen Farrell	2013	England	23	8	129	34
781	Richie Gray	2013	Scotland	6	1	0	0
782	Richard Hibbard	2013	Wales	9	3	5	0
783	Stuart Hogg	2013	Scotland	11	2	23	0
784	Dan Lydiate	2013	Wales	8	3	5	0
785	Sean Maitland	2013	Scotland	5	0	5	
786	Justin Tipuric	2013	Wales	12	1	0	0
787	Mako Vunipola	2013	England	20	9	5	0
788	Tom Youngs	2013	England	7	3	0	0
789	Cian Healy	2013	Ireland	2	0	0	0
790	Conor Murray	2013	Ireland	18	8	15	5
791	Johnny Sexton	2013	Ireland	14	6	22	5
792	George North	2013	Wales	10	3	25	10
793	Rory Best	2013	Ireland	9	0	0	0
794	Dan Cole	2013	England	14	3	0	0
795	Ian Evans	2013	Wales	4	0	0	0
796	Seán O'Brien	2013	Ireland	11	5	15	5
797	Manu Tuilagi	2013	England	4	1	0	0
798	Geoff Parling	2013	England	7	3	5	0
799	Ben Youngs	2013	England	7	2	10	0
800	Sam Warburton	2013	Wales	10	5	5	0
801	Alex Corbisiero	2013	England	5	2	5	5
802	Ryan Grant	2013	Scotland	3	0	0	0
803	Simon Zebo	2013	Ireland	3	0	0	0
804	Brad Barritt	2013	England	2	0	0	0
805	Billy Twelvetrees	2013	England	2	0	0	0
806	Christian Wade	2013	England	1	0	0	0
807	Tom Court	2013	Ireland	1	0	0	0
808	Iain Henderson	2017	Ireland	10	0	0	0
809	Jonathan Joseph	2017	England	3	0	5	0
810	Greig Laidlaw	2017	Scotland	6	0	3	0
811	Joe Marler	2017	England	5	0	0	0
812	Ross Moriarty	2017	Wales	1	0	0	0
813	Tommy Seymour	2017	Scotland	4	0	15	0
814	Kyle Sinckler	2017	England	14	6	0	0
815	Ben Te'o	2017	England	5	2	0	0
816	Anthony Watson	2017	England	11	5	15	0
817	George Kruis	2017	England	5	1	0	0
818	Tadhg Furlong	2017	Ireland	20	9	0	0
819	Jamie George	2017	England	11	3	10	0
820	Rhys Webb	2017	Wales	5	2	5	5
821	Dan Biggar	2017	Wales	10	3	85	26
822	Elliot Daly	2017	England	18	5	18	3
823	James Haskell	2017	England	4	0	0	0
824	Robbie Henshaw	2017	Ireland	9	3	5	0
825	Maro Itoje	2017	England	18	9	10	0
826	Courtney Lawes	2017	England	12	5	0	0
827	Jack McGrath	2017	Ireland	7	3	0	0
828	Jack Nowell	2017	England	6	2	10	0
829	Ken Owens	2017	Wales	13	5	5	5
830	Jared Payne	2017	Ireland	3	0	5	0
831	CJ Stander	2017	Ireland	6	1	5	0
832	Peter O'Mahony	2017	Ireland	4	1	0	0
833	Liam Williams	2017	Wales	11	5	0	0
834	Allan Dell	2017	Scotland	1	0	0	0
835	Finn Russell	2017	Scotland	9	4	61	26
836	Josh Adams	2021	Wales	5	1	40	0
837	Bundee Aki	2021	Ireland	12	4	10	0
838	Tadhg Beirne	2021	Ireland	13	5	25	5
839	Jack Conan	2021	Ireland	13	6	10	0
840	Rory Sutherland	2021	Scotland	7	2	0	0
841	Duhan van der Merwe	2021	Scotland	12	3	50	0
842	Wyn Jones	2021	Wales	5	1	5	0
843	Ali Price	2021	Scotland	7	3	5	0
844	Chris Harris	2021	Scotland	5	1	5	0
845	Jonny Hill	2021	England	3	0	5	0
846	Louis Rees-Zammit	2021	Wales	4	0	15	0
847	Hamish Watson	2021	Scotland	5	1	5	0
848	Zander Fagerson	2021	Scotland	4	0	5	0
849	Sam Simmonds	2021	England	6	1	5	0
850	Gareth Davies	2021	Wales	4	0	5	0
851	Luke Cowan-Dickie	2021	England	11	3	10	5
852	Adam Beard	2021	Wales	5	1	5	0
853	Tom Curry	2021	England	11	5	15	10
854	Josh Navidi	2021	Wales	2	0	0	0
855	Marcus Smith	2021	England	8	1	30	3
856	Finlay Bealham	2025	Ireland	5	0	0	0
857	Ben Earl	2025	England	7	2	0	0
858	Tommy Freeman	2025	England	6	3	10	0
859	Ellis Genge	2025	England	7	3	0	0
860	Alex Mitchell	2025	England	8	2	10	0
861	Jac Morgan	2025	Wales	7	2	10	5
862	Fin Smith	2025	England	5	0	25	0
863	Sione Tuipulotu	2025	Scotland	5	1	10	5
864	Rónan Kelleher	2025	Ireland	8	3	5	0
865	Henry Pollock	2025	England	5	0	5	0
866	Tomos Williams	2025	Wales	2	0	10	0
867	Mack Hansen	2025	Ireland	5	0	0	0
868	Pierre Schoeman	2025	Scotland	5	0	0	0
869	Scott Cummings	2025	Scotland	5	0	5	0
870	James Lowe	2025	Ireland	4	2	0	0
871	Joe McCarthy	2025	Ireland	4	1	0	0
872	Garry Ringrose	2025	Ireland	4	0	15	0
873	Dan Sheehan	2025	Ireland	6	3	10	10
874	Josh van der Flier	2025	Ireland	5	0	5	0
875	Ollie Chessum	2025	England	6	3	5	0
876	Andrew Porter	2025	Ireland	6	3	5	0
877	Will Stuart	2025	England	7	3	5	5
878	Huw Jones	2025	Scotland	7	3	20	5
879	Jamison Gibson-Park	2025	Ireland	5	3	0	0
880	James Ryan	2025	Ireland	5	2	0	0
881	Hugo Keenan	2025	Ireland	5	3	5	5
882	Blair Kinghorn	2025	Scotland	5	2	0	0
883	Ben White	2025	Scotland	3	0	5	0
884	Darcy Graham	2025	Scotland	1	0	5	0
885	Jamie Osborne	2025	Ireland	1	0	10	0
886	Thomas Clarkson	2025	Ireland	1	0	0	0
887	Gregor Brown	2025	Scotland	1	0	0	0
888	Ewan Ashman	2025	Scotland	1	0	0	0
