= Nic Pretorius =

South African rugby union player (1904–1990)

- Full name: Nicolaas Francois Pretorius
- Born: 10 December 1904 Vryburg, South Africa
- Died: 19 February 1990 (aged 85) Johannesburg, South Africa
- Height: 1.79 m (5 ft 10 in)
- Weight: 80.7 kg (178 lb)

Rugby union career
- Position: Flanker
Provincial / State sides
Years	Team	Apps	(Points)
- Transvaal
International career
Years	Team	Apps	(Points)
1928	South Africa	4	(0)

Nicolaas Francois Pretorius (10 December 1904 – 19 February 1990), also known as Nic Pretorius, was a South African international rugby union player and referee.

== Biography ==
Pretorius was born in Vryburg and went to school in Johannesburg, where he was based during his rugby career as a member of the Diggers club. He played as a specialist back row forward, who possessed the ball handling and kicking abilities of a centre, and was regarded as a clever player in both attack and defence. A Transvaal provincial representative, Pretorius was a member of the Springboks squad for the 1928 tour of New Zealand. He featured in all four Test matches against the All Blacks.

Later a referee, Pretorius most notably officiated the final Test match of the 1938 British Lions tour to South Africa at Newlands. The British Lions won the match 21–16, with Pretorius disallowing a try to Springbok Dai Williams in the final seconds, ruling that the pass he received from Johnny Bester had gone forward.

== See also ==
- List of South Africa national rugby union players
