= Jeff Reynolds =

Jeff Reynolds may refer to:

- Jeff Reynolds (basketball) (born 1956), American college basketball coach.
- Jeff Reynolds (rugby union) (1916–1996), English rugby union player.
- Jeff Reynolds (sprinter) (born 1966), American professional sprinter.
