= Ian Hastie =

Ian Hastie may refer to:

- Ian Hastie (rugby union) (1929–2009), Scottish international rugby union player
- Ian Hastie (footballer), English footballer for Birmingham and Wycombe Wanderers

== See also ==
- Iain Hastie, New Zealand association footballer
