= Johnny Bester =

South Africa international rugby union footballer

- Born: Johannes Lodewyk Augustinus Bester; 25 December 1917 Moorreesburg, Western Cape, South Africa
- Died: 14 May 1977 (aged 59)
- Height: 1.83 m (6 ft 0 in)
- Weight: 84 kg (185 lb)
- School: Hoërskool Jan van Riebeeck, Cape Town

Rugby union career
- Position(s): Wing, Centre
Amateur team(s)
Years	Team	Apps	(Points)
- Gardens RFC
Provincial / State sides
Years	Team	Apps	(Points)
1938–1939	Western Province		
International career
Years	Team	Apps	(Points)
1938	South Africa	2	(6)
1937	South Africa (tour)	12	(24)

Johannes Lodewyk Augustinus 'Johnny' Bester (25 December 1917 – 14 May 1977) was a South African rugby union player.

== Playing career ==
Bester matriculated at Jan van Riebeeck High School in Cape Town, after which he joined the Gardens Rugby Football Club, also situated within the Cape Town City Bowl. Shortly thereafter, the 19-year-old Bester became the youngest member of Phil Nel's famous 1937 touring team to Australia and New Zealand. Although he did not play in any test matches on tour, he did play in twelve tour matches, scoring eight tries.

Bester, one of the few players to represent the Springboks before playing for his provincial team, (Danie Craven was another) made his debut for Western Province against Sam Walker's touring British Isles team at Newlands on the 25th of June 1938. Bester scored two tries in this match and Western Province won 21–11. Bester made his test debut for the Springboks, in the second test match against the touring British Isles team on the 3rd of September 1938 at the Crusaders Ground in Port Elizabeth. He also played in the third test against the British Isles and scored a try in each of his test matches.

=== Test history ===
No.	Opposition	Result (SA 1st)	Position	Tries	Date	Venue
1.	(United Kingdom) British Isles	19–3	Wing	1	3 September 1938	Crusaders Ground, Port Elizabeth
2.	(United Kingdom) British Isles	16–21	Wing	1	10 September 1938	Newlands, Cape Town

== See also ==
- List of South Africa national rugby union players – Springbok no. 247
