= Robert Pedlow =

Rugby union player from Northern Ireland

- Born: 16 August 1868 Lurgan, County Armagh, Ireland
- Died: 10 February 1943 (aged 74) Bangor, County Down, Northern Ireland

Rugby union career
- Position: Halfback
International career
| Years | Team | Apps | (Points) |
| 1891 | Ireland | 1 | (0) |

Robert Pedlow (16 August 1868 — 10 February 1943) was an Irish international rugby union player.

Born in Lurgan, County Armagh, Pedlow was one of three brothers to be capped for Ireland, following his elder siblings James and Thomas when he appeared as a halfback against Wales at Llanelli in 1891. He played his club rugby for North of Ireland and was also an athlete of note, winning an Irish 120 yard hurdles championship.

Pedlow worked as a cotton and linen merchant.

== See also ==
- List of Ireland national rugby union players
