= Heatlie =

Heatlie is a surname. Notable people with the surname include:

- Bob Heatlie (born 1946), Scottish songwriter and producer
- Fairy Heatlie (1872–1951), South African rugby union player
