= Northern Ireland rugby union team =

Northern Ireland rugby union team could refer to:

- Ireland national rugby union team (Irish rugby is administered on an all-Ireland basis)
- Ulster Rugby (representing all nine counties of Ulster)
- North of Ireland Football Club (rugby union)

== See also ==
- Rugby union in Ireland and Category:Rugby union in Ireland
