= Mike Dunne (rugby union) =

Irish rugby union player

- Full name: Michael Joseph Dunne
- Born: 14 July 1906 Dublin, Ireland
- Died: 7 February 1967 (aged 60) Dublin, Ireland
- School: Castleknock College
- Occupation: Solicitor

Rugby union career
- Position: Lock
International career
Years	Team	Apps	(Points)
1928–34	Ireland	16	(0)
1930	British Lions		

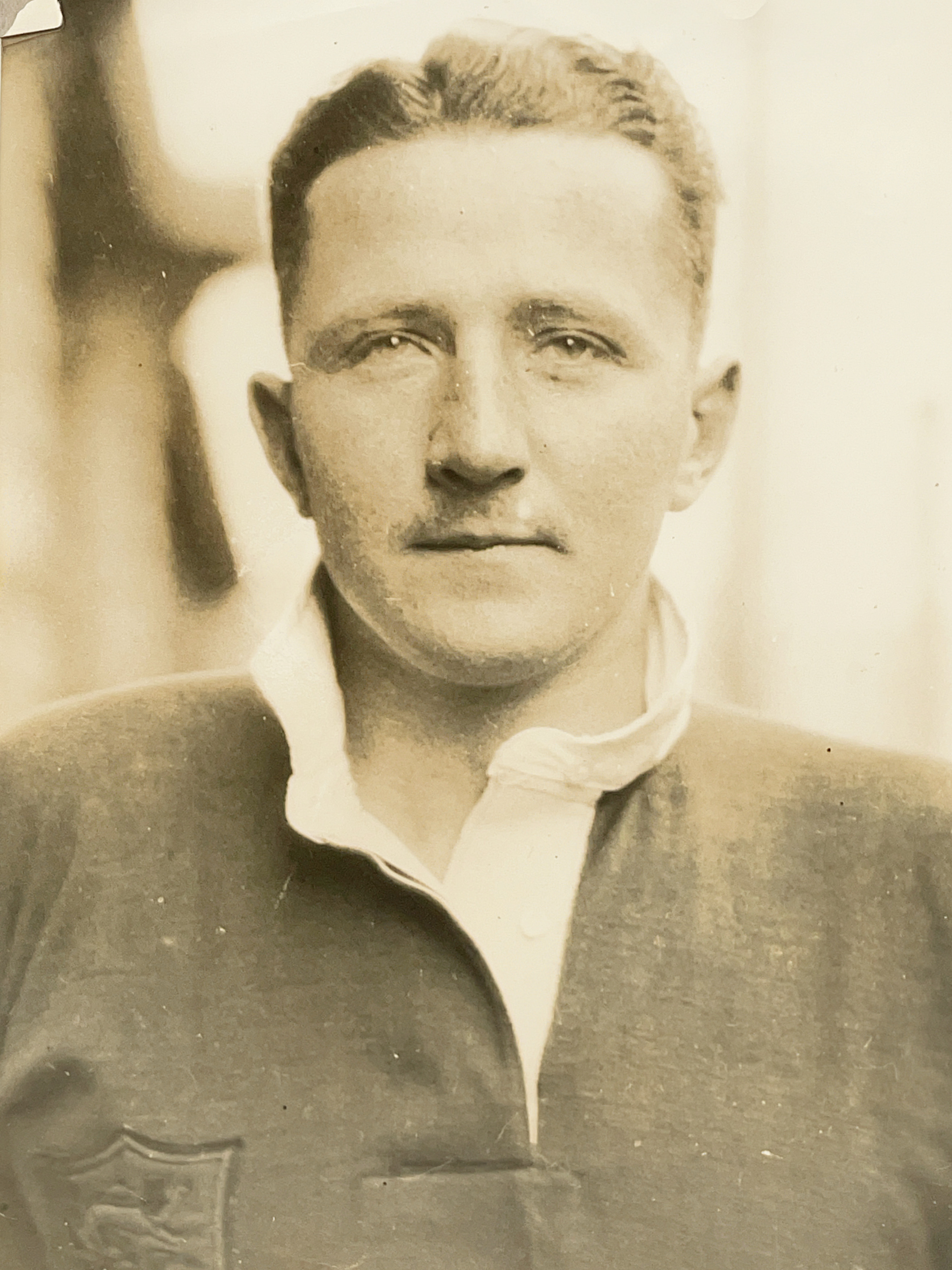
Michael "Mick" Joseph Dunne in a 1930 British Lions rugby shirt

Michael Joseph Dunne (14 July 1906 — 7 February 1967) was an Irish international rugby union player.

Michael Dunne was born and spent his early years on his fathers farm in Greenogue Parish in Co. Meath. Sadly his father died a couple of months after his birth but he continued to live there until his mother died tragically just before his 7th birthday in 1913. He became a ward of court and became a fulltime boarder at Castleknock College with a charitable bursary.

A second row forward, Dunne captained Dublin-based club Lansdowne and was capped 16 times for Ireland between 1928 and 1934. He also gained selection for the 1930 British & Irish Lions, playing 10 matches during tours of New Zealand and Australia, but none of the international fixtures.

Dunne was a solicitor by profession and practised in Dublin.

== See also ==
- List of Ireland national rugby union players
- List of British & Irish Lions players
