= Jack Wallens =

British Lions & England international rugby union player

- Full name: John Noel Stanley Wallens
- Born: 25 December 1901 Birkenhead, England
- Died: 25 July 1962 (aged 60) Frankston, Australia
- School: Merchant' Taylors School

Rugby union career
- Position: Fullback
International career
Years	Team	Apps	(Points)
1927	British Lions		
1927	England	1	(0)

John Noel Stanley Wallens (25 December 1901 – 25 July 1962) was an English international rugby union player.

Wallens was born in Birkenhead and educated at Merchant Taylors' School, Crosby, where he played stand-off. After joining Waterloo "A", Wallens switched to fullback and had several seasons as an understudy before himself as Waterloo's premier fullback in 1925-26. He made his Lancashire debut the following season.

In 1927, Wallens was capped for England in their final Five Nations fixture against France in Paris, with the incumbent fullback Kenneth Sellar unavailable to make the trip. He also took part in that year's tour of Argentina with the British Lions and featured in three of their four matches against the Pumas.

Wallens emigrated to Australia in 1929 to take up a new position with his employer the Cunard Steamship Company.

== See also ==
- List of British & Irish Lions players
- List of England national rugby union players
