= Bill Howard (rugby union) =

British Lions international rugby union player

- Full name: William Gordon Howard
- Born: 12 July 1908
- Died: 10 February 1979 (aged 70)
- School: Birkenhead School
- Occupation: Bank official

Rugby union career
- Position: Back row
International career
Years	Team	Apps	(Points)
1938	British Lions	1	(0)

William Gordon Howard (12 July 1908 – 10 February 1979) was an English international rugby union player.

Educated at Birkenhead School, Howard was a forward used mainly in the back row and a capable goal-kicker. He spent his entire career with Old Birkonians, which he captained, and gained regular selection for Cheshire.

Howard was overlooked by England selectors, in part by the fact he didn't play for a high-profile club, but did win a place on the British Lions squad for their 1938 tour to South Africa. Over the course of the trip, Howard featured in 10 tour fixtures, including the first of the three Tests against the Springboks.

In 1962–63, Howard served as president of Cheshire RFU.

== See also ==
- List of British & Irish Lions players
