= Norman Brand =

Irish rugby player (1899–1938)

- Full name: Thomas Norman Brand
- Born: 5 January 1899 Belfast, Ireland
- Died: 9 June 1938 (aged 39) off Poole, England

Rugby union career
- Position: Forward
International career
Years	Team	Apps	(Points)
1924	British Lions	2	(0)
1924	Ireland	1	(0)

Thomas Norman Brand (5 January 1899 — 9 June 1938) was an Irish international rugby union player.

Born in Belfast, Brand was educated at Coleraine Academical Institution. He played his rugby with Belfast-based club North of Ireland. A forward, Brand toured South Africa with the 1924 British Lions, featuring in the first two Test matches against the Springboks in Durban and Johannesburg, before gaining his solitary Ireland cap later that year when he faced the "Invincible" 1924–25 All Blacks at Lansdowne Road.

Brand later lived in Dorset and on 9 June 1938 died of an accidental drowning on Poole Harbour. He had been travelling to a yacht with two companions on a dinghy that capsized. When one of them, T. A. Denny, went unconscious, Brand and the other man W. E. Tranchell took turns keeping him afloat. Brand eventually grew tired but continued to take his turn holding Denny, telling Tranchell "Don't worry about me old man", before himself falling unconscious. Tranchell was unable to hold on to both men and had to let go of Brand, who drowned.

== See also ==
- List of Ireland national rugby union players
- List of British & Irish Lions players
