= Reg Maxwell =

British Lions international rugby union player

- Full name: Reginald Bellamy Maxwell
- Born: 12 April 1904 Pietermaritzburg, South Africa

Rugby union career
- Position: Three-quarter
International career
Years	Team	Apps	(Points)
1924	British Lions	1	(0)

Reginald Bellamy Maxwell was an English international rugby union player.

Born in Pietermaritzburg, South Africa, Maxwell moved to England as a child and was based in Birkenhead through his rugby career, where he was a member of the Birkenhead Park club.

Maxwell, who could play both as a half-back and three-quarter, was a Cheshire representative player and in 1924 gained a British Lions call up for their tour of South Africa. His place on the tour was almost lost after the invitation letter sent to his club had remained unopened for weeks and the selectors instead offered his spot to Mel Rosser. Unable to obtain leave from his work, Rosser had to decline the offer and another attempt was made to contact Maxwell, who this time responded to a letter sent to his private address. He played seven matches on tour, including the opening Test against the Springboks in Durban, then succumbed to injury and was replaced in the squad by Harold Davies.

== See also ==
- List of British & Irish Lions players
