= Tony O'Connor (rugby union) =

Wales international rugby union footballer

- Born: Anthony O'Connor; 24 April 1934 Neath, Wales
- Died: 22 May 2015 (aged 81) Bridgend, Wales
- Height: 5 ft 7 in (1.71 m)
- Weight: 74 kg (163 lb; 11 st 9 lb)
- School: Duffryn Grammar School
- University: Bristol University; Oxford University

Rugby union career
- Position: Scrum-half
Senior career
Years	Team	Apps	(Points)
- Aberavon RFC
- London Welsh RFC
International career
Years	Team	Apps	(Points)
1960–1962	Wales	5	(0)

Anthony O'Connor (24 April 1934 – 22 May 2015) was a Welsh rugby union player who played in the scrum-half position. O'Connor played club rugby with Aberavon RFC, was capped five times for Wales, and was a member of the British Lions team that toured in 1962. He also represented Oxford University RFC, playing in the 1958 Varsity Match.

== Early life ==
O'Conner was born in Neath on 24 April 1934. He attended Duffryn Grammar School, and then Bristol University. After that, he attended Oxford University where he read Research Crystallography at St Edmund Hall. While at Oxford, he played for Oxford University RFC, including the 1958 Varsity Match against Cambridge University R.U.F.C.

== Playing career ==
O'Connor played the majority of his club rugby for Aberavon RFC, and was club captain for the 1957-58 season. During his time at Oxford University, he played for London Welsh RFC. On three occasions, O'Connor was included in a combined Neath & Aberavon XV, which played matches against international touring opposition; Australia in 1957, South Africa in 1961 and New Zealand in 1963.

His first appearance for Wales came against South Africa in 1960. He played twice in the 1961 Five Nations tournament against England and Scotland, and once in the 1962 tournament against France. Six days after the match against France, O'Connor was included in the British Lions squad for their tour to South Africa. He played in ten matches on the tour against local opposition, but didn't feature in any of the four test matches against South Africa. O'Connor made two appearances for the Barbarians invitational team, the first came in March 1962 against East Midlands and the second in March 1963 against Leicester.
