= William Oldham (rugby union) =

England international rugby union player

- Full name: William Leonard Oldham
- Born: 15 June 1887 Coventry, England
- Died: 27 April 1965 (aged 77) Poole, England

Rugby union career
- Position: Forward
International career
Years	Team	Apps	(Points)
1908–09	England	2	(0)
1908	Anglo-Welsh	1	(0)

William Leonard Oldham (15 June 1887 – 27 April 1965) was an English international rugby union player.

Born in Coventry, Oldham picked up rugby union at the city's St Peter's School, but the team was age limited so he could only play until the age of 12. He subsequently joined Coventry seconds and was still as teenager when he debuted for the firsts in the 1902–03 season. Two of his three brothers would also play for Coventry.

Oldham became Coventry's first international when he was capped for England against Scotland at Inverleith in the 1908 Home Nations. Later that year, Oldham toured Australasia with an Anglo-Welsh team (retrospectively considered a British Lions tour) and featured in the opening Test match against the All Blacks at Dunedin. He was capped one more time for England and from 1909 to 1913 served as captain of Coventry.

After being a workhouse master in Coventry, Oldham relocated to Hornchurch, Essex, where he was worked as the superintendent of a children's home. He retired in 1951.

== See also ==
- List of England national rugby union players
- List of British & Irish Lions players
