= Eric Coley =

British Lions & England international rugby union player

- Born: 23 July 1903 Northampton, England
- Died: 3 May 1957 (aged 53) Northampton, England

Rugby union career
- Position: Back-row
International career
Years	Team	Apps	(Points)
1927	British Lions		
1929–32	England	2	(3)

Eric Coley (23 July 1903 – 3 May 1957) was an English international rugby union player.

A back-row forward, Coley spent his entire career with hometown club Northampton. He was a regular member of Barbarian invitational sides and toured Argentina with the British Lions in 1927, featuring in two of the four internationals against the Pumas. Capped twice for England, Coley debuted in an away win over France in 1929, then returned against Wales for the opening 1932 Home Nations fixture in Swansea, where he scored their solitary try in a losing cause.

Coley was later an England rugby selector and secretary of Northamptonshire County Cricket Club.

== See also ==
- List of British & Irish Lions players
- List of England national rugby union players
