= Brian Vaughan =

England international rugby union player

Douglas Vaughan
- Full name: Douglas Brian Vaughan
- Born: 15 July 1925 Wrexham, Wales
- Died: 19 April 1977 (aged 51) Isle of Man

Rugby union career
- Position: No. 8 / Flanker
International career
Years	Team	Apps	(Points)
1948–50	England	8	(0)

Douglas Brian Vaughan (15 July 1925 – 19 April 1977) was an English international rugby union player.

The son of a village GP, Vaughan played his rugby for Headingley, Combined Services and Yorkshire. He was capped eight times for England primarily as a number eight, debuting against the Wallabies at Twickenham in 1948.

Vaughan was a Instructor Commander in the Royal Navy.

Remaining involved in rugby as an administrator, Vaughan was the British Lions team manager on their 1962 tour of South Africa and served as a selector for England.

Vaughan's nephew Justin played Test cricket for New Zealand.

== See also ==
- List of England national rugby union players
