= Stan Hodgson =

England international rugby union player

- Born: Stanley Arthur Murray Hodgson; 14 May 1928 Durham, England
- Died: 25 March 2015 (aged 86)
- Height: 5 ft 10 in (178 cm)
- Weight: 12 st 3 lb (78 kg; 171 lb)

Rugby union career
- Position: Hooker
Amateur team(s)
Years	Team	Apps	(Points)
(?)	Durham City RFC		((?))
International career
Years	Team	Apps	(Points)
1960–1964	England	11	(0)

Stanley Arthur Murray Hodgson (14 May 1928 – 25 March 2015) was an English rugby union player who played in the Hooker position. Hodgson played club rugby for Durham City RFC, was capped eleven times for the England national team, and was a member of the British Lions team that toured in 1962. He made 72 appearances for the Durham County representative team and played four times for the Barbarians invitational team.

== Early life ==
Stanley Hodgson was born in Durham on 14 May 1928 to George and Mable. His mother Mable died when Stan was three months old, leaving him to be raised by his grandmother, aunts and uncles. Hodgson was educated at Whinny Hill school, and after leaving took up a job at a carpet factory. He married Doreen Smith, with whom he had four children.

== Club and representative career ==
Hodgson played all his club games for Durham City RFC. During a long career at the club, Hodgson eventually played for all four of their senior teams, before finally stopping playing at the age of 60. Hodgson was also selected for the Durham County representative team, and played a total of 72 matches for the team.

== International career ==
Hodgson made his début for the England national team against Wales in the 1960 Five Nations Championship. At 32 years old, Hodgson kept his age a secret fearing that it would affect his chances of being selected. He played all four of England's games in the 1960 championship. In 1961, Hodgson played against South Africa during their tour of Europe and Wales in the 1961 Five Nations.

His next appearances for the England national team came in 1962, when he again played all four of their matches in that year's Five Nations Championship. Hodgson was included in the British Lions squad for their tour of South Africa. He was selected to play in their opening game of the tour against Rhodesia, but broke his leg during the match ending his playing involvement for the rest of the tour. Rather than heading home, he was able to stay with the touring party as a guest of the South African rugby board.

His final appearance for England was in the 1964 Five Nations match against Wales.

Hodgson made a total of four appearances for the Barbarians invitational team, three during their 1960 Easter Tour and in their 1962 game against Canada.

Hodgson was made an MBE in the 1987 New Year Honours list "for services to Rugby Football".
