= Sam Martindale =

English rugby union player (1905–1986)

- Full name: Samuel Airey Martindale
- Born: 5 May 1905 Kendal, England
- Died: 19 January 1986 (aged 80) Kendal, England

Rugby union career
- Position: Lock
International career
Years	Team	Apps	(Points)
1929	England	1	(0)
1930	British Lions	1	(0)

Samuel Airey Martindale (5 May 1905 – 19 January 1986) was an English international rugby union player.

Martindale made his maiden competitive appearance aged 14, when the Preston Grasshoppers visited him hometown of Kendal and required an additional player. He made an impression as by the following season he was playing with the Kendal firsts, where he would spend his entire career.

A goal-kicking forward, Martindale amassed over 1,000 points for his club Kendal, which included a 92-goal season. He also played 56 county matches for Cumberland and was capped for England as a lock-forward in a 1929 Five Nations against France at Colombes. In 1930, Martindale toured Australasia with the British Lions, appearing in the one-off Test match against the Wallabies in Sydney. He retired with two international caps, one for England and one for the Lions, but was a reserve in a further 21 international matches.

== See also ==
- List of England national rugby union players
- List of British & Irish Lions players
