= Ian Hastie (rugby union) =

- Full name: Ian Robert Hastie
- Born: 7 September 1929 Kelso, Scotland
- Died: 6 April 2009 (aged 79) Lower Hutt, New Zealand

Rugby union career
- Position: Prop
International career
Years	Team	Apps	(Points)
1955–59	Scotland	6	(3)

Ian Robert Hastie (7 September 1929 – 6 April 2009) was a Scottish international rugby union player.

Born in Kelso, Hastie attended Abbey School and Kelso High School, moving to the latter during World War II. His father was a cabinet maker and he became an apprentice joiner after finishing his schooling. He undertook national service with the 1st Battalion, Cameronians (Scottish Rifles), and got sent to Malaya, where he was engaged in fighting with communist guerrillas. While in the army, Hastie won a Far East armed forces heavyweight boxing championship.

Hastie was a strong scrummaging prop and captained his local team Kelso RFC for two seasons. He gained six Scotland caps between 1955 and 1959. His solitary try came in a 1958 Five Nations match against France at Murrayfield, when he gathered a short line-out throw from Arthur Smith to cross in the corner, which was the final score of a 11–9 win.

Emigrating to New Zealand in the 1960s, Hastie found work on the railways and settled in the Hutt Valley. He was a successful darts player, winning national titles in the men's pairs and mixed pairs events. In 1977, Hastie returned to the United Kingdom to represent his adopted country in the World Masters at Wembley.

== See also ==
- List of Scotland national rugby union players
