= 1903 British Lions tour to South Africa =

- Date: 9 July – 12 September
- Coach: Johnny Hammond
- Tour captain: (Scotland) Mark Coxon Morrison
- Test series winners: South Africa (1–0)
- Top test point scorer: (Scotland) Jimmy Gillespie (4)

Tour chronology
- ← Australia 1899 Australia & New Zealand 1904 →

The 1903 British Isles tour to South Africa was the fifth tour by a British Isles rugby team and the third to South Africa. It is retrospectively classed as one of the British Lions tours, as the Lions naming convention was not adopted until 1950.

Led by Scotland's Mark Morrison and managed by Johnny Hammond the tour took in 22 matches. Of the games three were test matches, played against the South Africa national rugby union team. The British Isles drew the first two test matches and lost the final encounter.

Having lost only one game out of 40 matches in the previous two tours of South Africa, the British Isles team were truly tested by the South African rugby nation on this tour. Of the 22 games played, the tourist won eleven, drew three and lost eight. Unlike past teams, the British Isles three-quarter line was not seen as the team's strongest asset and more reliance was placed in the pack. Of the backs, only Reg Skrimshire, the only Welsh player selected, was judged to have shown any true flair; while the pack failed to live up to expectations, even when led by Scottish power-house David Bedell-Sivright.

The tour included Louis Leisler Greig, who later became well known as a royal equerry, friend of George VI and became a prominent member of the far right January Club.

== Touring party ==
- Manager: Johnny Hammond

=== Full Backs ===
- Edward Montague Harrison (Guy's Hospital/Middlesex/Barbarian F.C.)

=== Three-Quarters ===
- Alfred Hind (Cambridge University/Leicester/Midland Counties)
- Ian Davidson (North of Ireland)
- Gilbert Collett (Gloucestershire/Cambridge University)
- Reg Skrimshire (Newport/Blackheath F.C./Kent/Barbarian F.C.)
- Edward Forbes Walker (Lennox/Middlesex)

=== Half backs ===
- Louis Greig (Cambridge University/Glasgow Academicals/United Services and Scotland)
- John Imrie Gillespie (Edinburgh Academicals and Scotland)
- Robert Miln Neill (Edinburgh Academicals and Scotland)
- Pat Hancock (Richmond/Surrey)

=== Forwards ===
- Mark Morrison (Royal HSFP and Scotland) (captain)
- David Bedell-Sivright (Cambridge University and Scotland)
- William Patrick Scott (West of Scotland and Scotland)
- William Cave (Cambridge University/Blackheath F.C./Kent)
- J.C. Hosack (Edinburgh Wanderers)
- Robertson Smyth (Dublin University and Ireland)
- Alfred Tedford (Malone RFC and Ireland)
- Joseph Wallace (Wanderers/Dublin University and Ireland)
- James Wallace (Wanderers/Dublin University)
- Frank Stout (Richmond/Barbarian F.C./Gloucester and England)
- Thomas Alexander Gibson (Cambridge University)

== Results ==
1903 British Lions tour to South Africa
Summary
P	W	D	L
Total
22	11	3	8
Test match
3	0	2	1
Opponent
P	W	D	L
South Africa
3	0	2	1

Test matches

	Date	Opponent	Location	Result	Score
1	9 July	Western Province Country	Cape Town	Lost	7–13
2	11 July	Western Province Towns	Cape Town	Lost	3–12
3	13 July	Western Province	Cape Town	Lost	4–8
4	18 July	Port Elizabeth	Port Elizabeth	Won	13–0
5	20 July	Eastern Province	Port Elizabeth	Won	12–0
6	22 July	Grahamstown	Grahamstown	Won	28–7
7	25 July	King William's Town	King William's Town	Won	37–3
8	27 July	East London	East London, Eastern Cape	Won	7–5
9	1 August	Griqualand West	Kimberley	Lost	0–11
10	4 August	Griqualand West	Kimberley	Lost	6–8
11	8 August	Transvaal	Johannesburg	Lost	3–12
12	11 August	Pretoria	Pretoria	Won	15–3
13	13 August	Pietermaritzburg	Pietermaritzburg	Won	15–0
14	15 August	Durban	Durban	Won	22–0
15	19 August	Witwatersrand	Johannesburg	Won	12–0
16	22 August	Transvaal	Johannesburg	Lost	4–14
17	26 August	South Africa	Johannesburg	Draw	10–10
18	29 August	Orange River County	Bloemfontein	Won	17–16
19	2 September	Griqualand West	Kimberley	Won	11–5
20	5 September	South Africa	Kimberley	Drew	0–0
21	10 September	Western Province	Cape Town	Drew	3–3
22	12 September	South Africa	Cape Town	Lost	0–8

== The matches ==
After playing the first two Tests in white shirts, South Africa wore a green jersey (supplied by Old Diocesan's Club) for the first time in their final Test at Newlands.

=== First Test ===
26 August

South Africa	10–10	(United Kingdom) British Isles
Try: Dobbin; Frew; Con: Heatlie (2)		Try: Cave; Skrimshire; Con: Gillespie (2)

Wanderers Ground, Johannesburg
Attendance: 5,000
Referee: Bill Davidson (Scotland)

Team details

South Africa	British Isles

South Africa: CH Jones, DJA Morkel, WA van Renen, JD Krige, J Barry, JM Powell, FJ Dobbin, Alex Frew capt., WMC McEwan, JH Sinclair, JWE Raaff, PARO Nel, BH Heatlie, Joseph Partridge, CB Brown
British Isles: EM Harrison, IG Davidson, RT Skrimshire, LL Greig, GF Collett, JI Gillespie, PS Hancock, FM Stout, Jos. Wallace, TA Gibson, RS Smyth, A Tedford, MC Morrison capt., WP Scott, WTC Cave

=== Second Test ===
5 September

South Africa	0–0	(United Kingdom) British Isles

Athletic Ground, Kimberley
Attendance: 5,000
Referee: PW Day (South Africa)

Team details

South Africa	British Isles

South Africa: CH Jones, EAH Gibbs, S Ashley, SC de Melker, J Barry, JM Powell capt., FJ Dobbin, C Currie, HD Metcalf, JS Jackson, JWE Raaff, PARO Nel, GFT Crampton, WC Martheze, CB Brown

British Isles: RM Neill, EF Walker, RT Skrimshire, LL Greig, GF Collett, JI Gillespie, PS Hancock, FM Stout, Jos. Wallace, TA Gibson, RS Smyth, A Tedford, MC Morrison capt., WP Scott, WTC Cave

=== Third Test ===
12 September

South Africa	8–0	(United Kingdom) British Isles
Try: Barry; Reid; Con: Heatlie

Newlands Stadium, Cape Town
Attendance: 6,000
Referee: JH Anderson (South Africa)

Team details

South Africa	British Isles

South Africa: WA van Renen, JA Loubser, HW Carolin, JD Krige, J Barry, HH Ferris, TEC Hobson, A Reid, MWC McEwan, P Roos, JW Anderson, PARO Nel, JA Botha, BH Heatlie capt., CB Brown
British Isles: RM Neill, EF Walker, RT Skrimshire, LL Greig, GF Collett, JI Gillespie, PS Hancock, FM Stout, Jos. Wallace, TA Gibson, RS Smyth, A Tedford, MC Morrison capt., WP Scott, WTC Cave
