= Hugh C. Kelly =

Rugby union player from Northern Ireland

Hugh Kelly
- Full name: Hugh Cunningham Kelly
- Born: 20 May 1849 Belfast, Ireland
- Died: 13 November 1944 (aged 95) Belfast, Northern Ireland

Rugby union career
- Position: Forward
International career
Years	Team	Apps	(Points)
1877–80	Ireland	6	(0)

Hugh Cunningham Kelly (20 May 1849 – 13 November 1944) was an Irish international rugby union player.

Kelly was born in Belfast and attended Royal Belfast Academical Institution. He initially pursued his father's profession and qualified as a solicitor, but didn't end up practising. In 1873, Kelly was appointed Under-Sheriff of County Down.

A hefty forward, Kelly played his rugby for Belfast club North of Ireland and was capped six times for Ireland from 1877 to 1880, which included a period as team captain.

Kelly had a noted career as a sports administrator, serving as president of the Irish Lacrosse Union and on the Royal Ulster Yacht Club committee, in which capacity he was involved with Thomas Lipton's America's Cup challenges.

Married with no children, Kelly's wife was a daughter of politician Arthur Forwood.

== See also ==
- List of Ireland national rugby union players
