= Reg Skrimshire =

British Lions & Wales international rugby union footballer

- Born: Reginald Truscott Skrimshire; 30 January 1878 Crickhowell, Wales
- Died: 20 September 1963 (aged 85) High Salvington, England
- School: Monmouth School
- Occupation: Civil engineer

Rugby union career
- Position: Centre
Amateur team(s)
Years	Team	Apps	(Points)
?-1897	Blaenavon RFC		
1897–1903	Newport RFC		
1903–?	Blackheath F.C.		
1898–1899	Barbarian F.C.		
- Western Province
International career
Years	Team	Apps	(Points)
1899	Wales	3	(0)
1903	British Lions	3	(1)

Reginald Truscott Skrimshire (30 January 1878 – 20 September 1963) was a Welsh international rugby union forward who played club rugby for Newport and county rugby for Kent. He won three caps for Wales and was the only Welsh representative on the 1903 British Isles tour.

== Career ==
Skrimshire was born in Crickhowell in 1878, and educated at Monmouth School.

He became a civil engineer who worked mainly in Ceylon, Southern Africa and India. Employed by the Foreign and Commonwealth Office he built railways and bridges in the former British Empire, his most notable work being the railway from Johannesburg to the Victoria Falls, including the famous bridge over the falls. He died at Swan Dean Hospital in High Salvington, England in 1963.

== Rugby career ==
After playing his early rugby with Blaenavon he moved to first class side Newport. He made his Newport debut against English side Moseley in 1897, and in his first season scored 16 tries in 24 matches, a good return for a centre. Skrimshire was regarded as a fast and agile runner who had a cool head and good positional ability, though he was noted as being greedy with the ball and needed to release more to his wing players.

Skrimshire was first selected for Wales against England on 9 January 1899 at St Helens in front of a Welsh record crowd of 20,000. Wales ran out comfortable winners and Skrimshire was back in the team for the Scotland game two months later. Although Wales lost the match against Scotland, he retained his place for the final game of the 1899 tournament against Ireland. Ireland won the a much disrupted game, caused by crowd trouble, and took the Triple Crown. It would be Skrimshire's last match for Wales.

In 1903 Skrimshire was selected for Mark Morrison's British Isles team to South Africa. Skrimshire was the only Welsh representative but integrated well and played in all but one of the 22 matches including all three tests against the South African team. Skrimshire was the only threequarter to have improved his reputation during the tour and scored an excellent try in the first test at Johannesburg. He finished the tour as the team's highest scorer and would later move to South Africa and played for Western Province.

=== International matches played ===
Wales

- England 1899
- Scotland 1899
- Ireland 1899

British Isles

- South Africa 1903, 1903, 1903

== Bibliography ==
- Godwin, Terry (1984). The International Rugby Championship 1883–1983. Grafton Street, London: Willow Books. ISBN 0-00-218060-X.
- Griffiths, Terry (1987). The Phoenix Book of International Rugby Records. London: Phoenix House. ISBN 0-460-07003-7.
- Parry-Jones, David (1999). Prince Gwyn, Gwyn Nicholls and the First Golden Era of Welsh Rugby. Bridgend: seren. ISBN 1-85411-262-7.
- Smith, David; Williams, Gareth (1980). Fields of Praise: The Official History of The Welsh Rugby Union. Cardiff: University of Wales Press. ISBN 0-7083-0766-3.
