= Roy Jennings (rugby union) =

- Born: 14 August 1905
- Died: 5 October 1968 (aged 63)
- School: Taunton School

Rugby union career
- Position: Fullback / Three–quarter
International career
Years	Team	Apps	(Points)
1930	British Lions		

Roy Jennings (14 August 1905 – 5 October 1968) was an English international rugby union player.

The son of a leather merchant, Jennings hailed from the Cornwall town of Redruth and was educated locally at Redruth County School, before completing his schooling at Taunton School.

Jennings spent his rugby career in Cornwall and was a prolific points–scorer for his club Redruth RFC, as a goal–kicking fullback and three–quarter. His first appearance for Cornwall was as a 19-year old against the "Invincible" 1924–25 All Blacks and he played a total of 61 matches for his county. He was a seven–time England trialist, without ever getting a call up, and in 1930 toured New Zealand and Australia with the British Lions. Over the course of the tour, Jennings contributed 12 tries, which included three against Victoria and four against Western Australia.

== See also ==
- List of British & Irish Lions players
