= Tommy Hobson =

South African rugby union player (1881–1937)

- Born: Thomas Edward Carter Hobson; 26 March 1881 Somerset East, Cape Colony
- Died: 2 September 1937 (aged 56) near Kimberley, Cape Province

Rugby union career
- Position: Half-back
International career
Years	Team	Apps	(Points)
1903	South Africa	1	(0)

T. E. C. "Tommy" Hobson (26 March 1881 – 2 September 1937) was a South African international rugby union player.

Hobson played his club rugby at Hamilton and represented West Province at both cricket and rugby.

He appeared in his only Test match during the tour of South Africa by the British Isles team in 1903.

As a cricketer he played two first-class matches for Western Province, both back to back fixtures in the 1906/07 Currie Cup. A bowler, he wasn't used in his debut match against Eastern Province, with the other bowlers dismissing their opponents cheaply in both innings. His next match was played against Griqualand West and he took 4/32 in the first innings and one more wicket in the second.
