= Roy Leyland =

British rugby player (1912–1984)

- Born: 6 March 1912 Astley, Lancashire, England
- Died: 4 January 1984 (aged 71) Pewsey, Wiltshire, England
- School: Wigan Grammar School
- University: Liverpool University
- Occupation: Military officer

Rugby union career
- Position: Centre / Wing
International career
Years	Team	Apps	(Points)
1935	England	3	(0)
1938	British Lions		

Lieutenant Colonel Roy Leyland OBE (6 March 1912 – 4 January 1984) was a British Army officer and England international rugby union player of the 1930s.

== Biography ==
Leyland was born in Astley, a village between Manchester and Wigan. He attended Wigan Grammar School and Liverpool University, where he gained rugby colours his freshman year.

A three-quarter, Leyland attained three England caps in the 1935 Home Nations Championship. These remained his only England matches, although he subsequently achieved a British Lions call up, making uncapped appearances on the 1938 tour South Africa. He played for the Army, Barbarians, Combined Services, Hampshire, Lancashire, Leicester, Richmond, Waterloo and Wigan Old Boys over the course of his career.

Leyland served with the East Surrey Regiment during World War II and participated in the North West Europe campaign. He was a staff officer in Iraq during the early 1950s and in 1957 was awarded an OBE for his military service. Retiring a Lieutenant Colonel in 1959, Leyland became a civilian lecturer at Sandhurst.

== See also ==
- List of British & Irish Lions players
- List of England national rugby union players
