= Griff Purchas =

British Lions international rugby union player (1912–1992)

- Full name: Arthur G. H. Purchas
- Born: 29 May 1912
- Died: 2 September 1992 (aged 80)
- School: Rossall School

Rugby union career
- Position: Lock
International career
Years	Team	Apps	(Points)
1938	British Lions		

Arthur G. H. "Griff" Purchas (29 May 1912 – 2 September 1992) was an English international rugby union player.

Purchas was educated at Rossall School and started his career with Lincoln, before joining Coventry RFC during the 1934–35 season when he got a job with Westminster Bank.

A tall, back row forward, Purchas was a strong asset in the line-out.

Purchas toured South Africa with the British Lions in 1938 and appeared in a total of eight fixtures, but remained in reserve for the three Test matches. He was never selected for England.

== See also ==
- List of British & Irish Lions players
