= James Bordass =

- Full name: James Harrison Bordass
- Born: 2 July 1903
- Died: December 1972 (aged 69)
- School: Royal Grammar School
- University: University of Cambridge

Rugby union career
- Position: Centre
International career
Years	Team	Apps	(Points)
1924	British Lions		

James Harrison Bordass (2 July 1903 – December 1972) was an English international rugby union player.

Raised in Newcastle upon Tyne, Bordass was captain of the rugby team at Royal Grammar School and attended Gonville and Caius College, Cambridge, winning blues for rugby.

Bordass, a centre, toured South Africa with the British Lions in 1924 and appeared in 11 of the fixtures. He also played for Old Novocastrians RFC, Cleckheaton, Newcastle, Northumberland and Richmond.

== See also ==
- List of British & Irish Lions players
