= Pat Hancock =

British Lions & England international rugby union player

- Full name: Patrick Sortain Hancock
- Born: 8 July 1883 Assam, British India
- Died: 22 December 1940 (aged 57) Minnedosa, MB, Canada
- School: Dulwich College

Rugby union career
- Position: Fly-half
International career
Years	Team	Apps	(Points)
1903	British Lions	3	(0)
1904	England	3	(0)

Patrick Sortain Hancock (8 July 1883 – 22 December 1940) was an English international rugby union player.

Hancock was born in Assam, India. His father, a doctor, was Medical Officer to the Assam Valley Light Horse. He came to England at age eight and was educated at Dulwich College in south London.

A half-back, Hancock played for Streatham at the end of his schooling and was an Eastern Counties representative player. He next played with Richmond and it was from that club that he won a place on the 1903 British Lions tour to South Africa, where he featured in all three international matches against the South Africans, at the youthful age of 20. In 1904, Hancock was capped for England in all three of their Home Nations fixtures.

Hancock moved to Canada soon after his England caps in 1904 and eventually settled in Minnedosa, Manitoba.

During World War I, Hancock served as a Lieutenant in the 43rd Battalion, Cameron Highlanders, part of the Canadian Expeditionary Force, and was badly wounded in the Battle of Passchendaele in 1917.

== See also ==
- List of England national rugby union players
- List of British & Irish Lions players
