= John Dee (rugby union) =

England international rugby union player

- Full name: John MacKenzie Dee
- Born: 22 October 1938 (age 88) Hartlepool, England
- Height: 5 ft 9 in (175 cm)

Rugby union career
- Position: Centre / Wing
International career
Years	Team	Apps	(Points)
1962–63	England	2	(0)

John MacKenzie Dee (born 22 October 1938) is an English former international rugby union player.

Dee played his rugby for hometown club Hartlepool Rovers. He made his England debut as a centre against Scotland at Murrayfield in the 1962 Five Nations Championship and toured South Africa that year with the British Lions. In 1963, Dee made the England squad for their Australasia tour, where he was capped a second time in the Auckland Test against the All Blacks, playing as a winger. His father Jack was a trainer on the England team.

== See also ==
- List of England national rugby union players
