= Syd Ashley =

South African rugby union player

- Born: Sydney Ashley; 23 February 1880 Cape Town, Cape Colony
- Died: 20 January 1959 (aged 78) Somerset West, South Africa
- School: Diocesan College

Rugby union career
- Position: Centre
Provincial / State sides
Years	Team	Apps	(Points)
- Western Province
- Correct as of 19 July 2010
International career
Years	Team	Apps	(Points)
1903	South Africa	1	(0)
- Correct as of 19 July 2010

Sydney "Syd" Ashley (23 February 1880 – 20 January 1959) was a South African international rugby union player. Born in Cape Town, he attended Diocesan College before playing provincial rugby for Western Province. He made his only Test appearance for South Africa during Great Britain's 1903 tour. He played at centre for the 2nd Test of the series, a 0–0 draw in Kimberley. Ashley died in 1959, in Somerset West, at the age of 78.
