= Peter Wright (rugby union, born 1931) =

England international rugby union player

- Full name: Thomas Peter Wright
- Born: 28 February 1931 Roxby, Lincolnshire, England
- Died: 22 April 2002 (aged 71) Devizes, Wiltshire, England

Rugby union career
- Position: Prop
International career
| Years | Team | Apps | (Points) |
| 1960–62 | England | 13 | (0) |
| 1962 | British Lions | | |

Thomas Peter Wright (28 February 1931 – 22 April 2002) was an English rugby union international.

== Biography ==
Born in Roxby, Lincolnshire, Wright was educated at The Judd School and played his early rugby for Tonbridge.

Wright, a prop, joined Blackheath in 1954 and went on to captain the club in the early 1960s. He was capped 13 times by England from 1960 to 1962 and toured South Africa with the 1962 British Lions.

A brewery worker by profession, Wright died of a heart attack in 2002 at the age of 71.

== See also ==
- List of England national rugby union players
