= Beef Dancer =

English rugby union player

Gerald Thomas Dancer
- Born: 1911 Bedford, Bedfordshire, England
- Died: 1991 (aged 79–80)
- Occupation(s): Rugby union footballer, publican

Rugby union career
Senior career
Years	Team	Apps	(Points)
–	Bedford Athletic		
–	Bedford Blues		
Provincial / State sides
Years	Team	Apps	(Points)
–	East Midlands		
International career
Years	Team	Apps	(Points)
–	Barbarians F.C.		
1938	British & Irish Lions	3	

Gerald Thomas Dancer (1911-1991), known as Beef, was a prominent English rugby union footballer who played in the 1930s and 1940s. He played in all three test matches of the 1938 British Lions tour to South Africa.

== Early career ==
Dancer was born on 15 January 1911 in Bedford and was educated at Queen's Park School and Bedford Modern School where he showed a natural aptitude for the game. After leaving school he played most of his club rugby for Bedford Athletic. He had made his debut for Bedford Blues against an Old Bedford Modernian XV on Easter Monday 1928, but it was not until the 1931–32 season that he joined the club on a permanent basis. Dancer was a tough and mobile prop forward and he helped Bedford to develop into one of the leading English club sides during the late 1930s. Several of his team-mates gained international honours but Dancer, despite playing representative rugby for the East Midlands and in various England trials, never won a full England cap. In a newspaper interview given to the Bedfordshire Times in 1983 he revealed that he had been offered contracts by the professional rugby league clubs Leeds and Hunslet, and given the antipathy of the Rugby Football Union (RFU) to the professional code at the time, it is possible that such negotiations ultimately counted against him.

== The Lions ==
Dancer also played for the Barbarians F.C. and was a popular member of the club's annual Easter Tours to South Wales. The Barbarians' management had a strong influence on the selection of the Lions' touring squads, and when the party was announced for the 1938 tour to South Africa Beef was an obvious selection. South Africa, under the leadership of Danie Craven, were a formidable team, and they comfortably won the first two tests at Johannesberg and Port Elizabeth. Dancer's greatest game came in the third test at Newlands, Cape Town where he was one of four second-half try scorers as the Lions overcame a 13 points to 3 half-time deficit to win 21-16. This was the first Springboks defeat by the Lions for 7 matches and 28 years.

== Later career ==
On the outbreak of War in 1939 Dancer enlisted in the Royal Air Force, and he continued to play sporadically for the R.A.F., Bedford and the Barbarians as well as in Service Internationals. He continued with Bedford after the war until finally retiring at the end of the 1947–48 season. In all he made 317 appearances for the club and scored 25 tries. In International Rugby his record was three caps, scoring one try. After retiring, Dancer became landlord of the Seven Wives pub in St Ives, Cambridgeshire (then Huntingdonshire). He died in August 1991.
