= North of Ireland F.C. =

Defunct Irish rugby union club, based in Belfast

(Northern Ireland) North of Ireland FC
- Full name: North of Ireland Football Club
- Union: IRFU; Ulster
- Founded: 1868; 158 years ago
- Ground(s): Ormeau Road; Belfast
- League(s): Ulster Senior League; AIB League

North of Ireland Football Club is a former Irish rugby union club that was based in Belfast, Northern Ireland. It was the first rugby club formed in what is now Northern Ireland and only two other clubs - Dublin University and Wanderers - were formed earlier anywhere else in all Ireland. It was founded in 1868 by members of North of Ireland Cricket Club. NIFC also played in the first recorded rugby game in Ulster when they played a 20-a-side match against Queen's University RFC.

Throughout its history, NIFC was one of the most successful clubs in Ulster rugby, winning eighteen Ulster Senior League titles and eighteen Ulster Senior Cup titles. They also played several seasons in the AIB League before merging with Collegians in 1999 to form Belfast Harlequins.

The club left its historic home on the Ormeau Road (one of the earliest international rugby venues in Ireland) after a series of sectarian arson attacks, including the burning of its pavilion. The club, with a mainly Protestant membership, was perceived as being "isolated in a zone of working-class nationalism".

== Notable players ==
See also Category:North of Ireland F.C. players

=== Ireland ===
The following NIFC players represented Ireland at full international level.

- Stephen Blake-Knox
- Robert Alexander
- Norman Brand
- Ian Davidson
- Thomas Gisborne Gordon, the only one handed player in international rugby.
- Gordon Hamilton
- David Hewitt
- Des Scott
- Jack Kyle
- Mike Gibson
- Arthur Norman McClinton
- Henry Neill
- Albert Stewart
- Dolway Walkington
- Hugh Kelly (captain)

=== British and Irish Lions ===
The following NIFC players also represented the British and Irish Lions.

- Tom McGown: 1899
- Ian Davidson: 1903
- Arthur Norman McClinton: 1910
- Norman Brand: 1924
- Robert Alexander: 1938
- Jack Kyle: 1950
- David Hewitt: 1959, 1962
- Mike Gibson: 1966, 1968, 1971, 1974, 1977

=== Ireland cricket team ===
The following NIFC players also represented Ireland at cricket.

- Robert Alexander
- Neil Doak

== Honours ==
- All-Ireland Cup: 1
  - 1934-35
- Ulster Senior Cup: 18
  - 1884–85, 1892–93, 1893–94, 1894–95, 1895–96, 1896–97, 1897–98, 1898–99, 1900–01, 1901–02, 1907–08, 1919–20, 1929–30, 1934–35, 1938–39, 1954–55, 1968–69, 1972–73
- Ulster Senior League: 18 (1 shared)
  - 1891–92, 1892–93, 1893–94, 1894–95, 1895–96, 1896–97, 1897–98, 1898–99, 1900–01, 1901–02, 1908–09, 1920–21, 1926-27 (shared), 1945–46, 1954–55, 1958–59, 1965–66, 1991–92
- Ulster Junior Cup: 9
  - †1894-95, †1906-07, †1907-08, †1908-09, †1935-36, †1953-54, †1956-57, †1962-63, †1984-85

† Won by 2nd XV
