= Arthur McClinton =

Rugby union player from Northern Ireland

- Born: Arthur Norman McClinton; 16 August 1886 Belfast, Ireland
- Died: 29 November 1929 (aged 43) Belfast, Northern Ireland

Rugby union career
- Position: Fly-half
Senior career
Years	Team	Apps	(Points)
c.1910	North of Ireland F.C.		
International career
Years	Team	Apps	(Points)
1910	Ireland	2	(2)
1910	British Isles	0	(0)

Arthur Norman McClinton (16 August 1886 – 29 November 1929) was an Irish rugby union international who was part of the first official British Isles team that toured South Africa in 1910. He also played on 2 occasions for Ireland.

== Early life ==
Arthur Norman McClinton was born in Belfast, Ireland on 16 August 1886 the son of John McClinton and his wife Rosa Hurst McClinton. His father was a seed merchant, also born in Belfast, whilst his mother hailed from County Armagh. He had at least four siblings: Dorothy Louise McClinton; Marie Rose McClinton; John Stuart McClinton and Fred Hurst McClinton.

== Rugby career ==
McClinton played rugby union as a fly-half for the third oldest club in Ireland, North of Ireland FC, with whom he won the 1908 Ulster Senior Cup. He was selected to play for Ireland in 1910, debuting at Lansdowne Road against Wales on 12 March 1910 in that first ever Five Nations championship. He played again on 28 March against France in Paris, and this was in fact his final appearance for his country. Later that year he was selected for the first official British Isles team that toured South Africa in 1910. In that tour he played second fiddle to George Isherwood, not managing to appear in any of the Tests. However, he shone in the midweek side, making eight appearances and knocking over two drop goals against Orange River County and Southern Rhodesia.

== Military service ==
Along with his two brothers, John Stuart and Frederick Hurst, Arthur served in the Great War. John was with 7th Battalion, King's Shropshire Light Infantry and did not survive the war. Arthur served with 10th (South Belfast) Battalion, Royal Irish Rifles. He was awarded the Military Cross, his citation reading:

"For conspicuous gallantry in action. He kept his company in hand with great determination under heavy fire, and finally led it over "No Man's Land" into the enemy's lines. Later, he did fine work in organizing the defences of the captured trenches." By the end of the war he was a Temporary Captain.

== Personal life and family ==
Arthur's brother Frederick Hurst did survive the war and had a son, John Fredric McClinton, born 29 June 1923, who, like his uncle Arthur, was a good rugby player, became a Captain in the Second World War and was awarded an MC (and bar).
