= Mark Coxon Morrison =

British Lions & Scotland international rugby union player

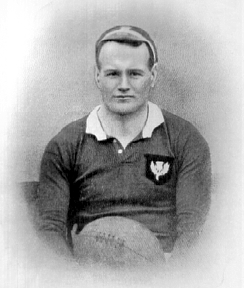
- Born: 3 April 1877 Dalmeny, Scotland
- Died: 10 May 1945 (aged 68) Longniddry, Scotland
- School: Royal High School, Edinburgh
- Notable relative: Alexander Morrison Uncle
- Occupation: Farmer

Rugby union career
- Position: Forward
Amateur team(s)
Years	Team	Apps	(Points)
- Royal HSFP
–	Leicester Tigers		
Provincial / State sides
Years	Team	Apps	(Points)
- Edinburgh District
International career
Years	Team	Apps	(Points)
1896-1904	Scotland	23	(0)
1903	British and Irish Lions	3	(0)

55th President of the Scottish Rugby Union
- In office 1934–1935
- Preceded by: John MacGill
- Succeeded by: William Patrick Scott

Mark Coxon Morrison (3 April 1877 – 10 May 1945) was a Scottish international rugby union footballer who captained both Scotland and the British and Irish Lions.

== Rugby Union career ==
=== Amateur career ===
Morrison played for Royal HSFP.

He played two games for Leicester, one in 1898 and one in 1902.

=== Provincial career ===
Morrison played for Edinburgh District and played in the Inter-City matches against Glasgow District.

=== International career ===
He played for Scotland twenty three times between 1896 and 1904, and captained the team fifteen times, a record which stood until the era of Arthur Smith, sixty years later.

He first played for Scotland against Wales in 1896, while a teenager playing for Royal HSFP. He continued to play for Scotland until 1904, and captained them a total of 15 times. With Scotland he won three Home Nations Championship with them in 1901, 1903 and 1904. Two of those Championship victories were Triple Crown wins (1901 and 1903).

He was chosen to captain the British and Irish Lions on the 1903 British Lions tour to South Africa. The Lions lost the Test series 1–0 with two drawn. In 2002 he was inducted into the Scottish Sports Hall of Fame.

Jimmy Sinclair, the Springbok forward described Morrison as "a real roughouse of a man, and a great leader."

=== Administrative career ===
He was the 55th President of the Scottish Rugby Union, in post from 1934 to 1935.

== Personal life ==
Mark Coxon Morrison was born on 3 April 1877 at Dalmeny, Linlithgowshire (now West Lothian) to John Morrison (1839-1923) and Jane Begg (1846-1911).

His father's brother was Alexander Morrison, who was the first Government Botanist in Western Australia.

Mark spent his childhood and teenage years residing with his parents and siblings at the family farm at Wester Dalmeny.

Mark married Mona Middlemas Oliver (1893-1918) on 4 June 1914 at the Parish Church of Maryhill, Lanarkshire. The ceremony was performed by the Minister of Glasgow Cathedral, Pearson McAdam Muir.

The couple had two daughters, Isabella Mona Morrison (1915-1984) and Sybil Jane Morrison (1917-2007).

Mark's first wife Mona died in 1918, aged 25 years.

Following Mona's death Mark married Elspeth Barnes Smith on 22 October 1919 at The Crown Hotel, Thornton in the Parish of Markinch, Fife.

Mark and Elspeth had just one son, Norman Begg Morrison, who died during World War II. He was a Sergeant Pilot in the RAF. He flew out of Scampton, Lincolnshire on a night mission and his plane was shot down by flak crashing at Sandkiva, Norway on 7 September 1941 aged just 20 years.

He was a farmer by trade.

Mark died on 10 May 1945 at his farm at Longniddry, East Lothian aged 68 years.

Some 57 years after his death Mark was inducted into the Scottish Sports Hall of Fame for Rugby Union.
