= Louis Greig =

British Lions & Scotland international rugby union player (1880-1953)

Sir Louis Leisler Greig KBE CVO
- Greig and King George VI
- Born: Louis Leisler Greig; 17 November 1880 Glasgow, Scotland
- Died: 1 March 1953 (aged 72) Ham, Surrey, England
- School: Glasgow Academy & Merchiston Castle School
- University: University of Glasgow
- Occupation(s): Stockbroker, surgeon, royal equerry

Rugby union career
- Position: Forward
Amateur team(s)
Years	Team	Apps	(Points)
- United Services Portsmouth
International career
Years	Team	Apps	(Points)
1905–1908	Scotland	5	(0)
1903	British and Irish Lions	3	(0)

Group Captain Sir Louis Leisler Greig, KBE CVO (17 November 1880 – 1 March 1953) was a Scottish naval surgeon, rugby and tennis player, courtier and a friend of King George VI.

== Rugby union ==
Greig was a successful rugby player, and was capped for Scotland and the British Lions when they took their 1903 British Lions tour to South Africa. He took part in all three Tests against South Africa as well as some of the provincial matches.

== Biography ==
Grieg was born in Glasgow on 17 November 1880, the ninth of the eleven children of Jessie, née Thomson (1844–1915) and Robert David Greig (1838–1900), a prosperous merchant and founder of the Glasgow and West of Scotland Association for Women's Suffrage. Greig was educated at Glasgow Academy and Merchiston Castle School before studying medicine at the University of Glasgow. Academically gifted, Greig was also an excellent rugby union and tennis player. After a few years practising as a junior doctor in the Gorbals, he joined the navy in 1906 and won the gold medal during his training at Haslar.

In 1909, Greig entered officer training at the Royal Naval College, Osborne, where he met Prince Albert, later George VI. He served as a mentor for the gauche and diffident prince, and the two served together in HMS Cumberland, where he was posted as a surgeon. He was transferred to the Royal Marines in 1914, and was captured at the fall of Antwerp, spending eight months as a prisoner of war. Earlier his elder brother Robert C Greig of Capelrig, Renfrewshire had founded the firm of RC Greig stockbrokers of Glasgow and London, and his elder sister Constance had married John Scrimgeour, stockbroker in London.

Released by a prisoner exchange, Greig married Phyllis Scrimgeour (a cousin of John Scrimgeour) on 16 February 1916, by whom he had three children:

- Bridget Greig (b. 1917), married Sir Ninian Buchan-Hepburn, 6th Baronet in 1958
- Jean Greig (1920–1973), married Joseph Cooper in 1947
- Captain Sir (Henry Louis) Carron Greig, KCVO, CBE, DL (1925–2012), a businessman and ship broker, Gentleman Usher in Ordinary to Queen Elizabeth II from 1961 to 1995; he married Monica Stourton in 1955; the couple had three sons, one of whom, Louis Stourton Greig (born 1956), served as Page of Honour to Queen Elizabeth II, as well as a daughter.

Greig joined the company of HMS Malaya in June 1917, rejoining Prince Albert, and helped cure the Prince of the severe peptic ulcers from which he suffered. During the next seven years, he was extensively in attendance on the Prince, receiving an appointment as an equerry to the Prince in 1918. Prince Albert and his Equerry both joined the Royal Air Force in 1919 (Greig rising to the rank of Wing Commander), and the two were partners at Wimbledon, an event which brought Greig's influence with the Prince into public light.

He continued to mentor and advise the Prince (created Duke of York in 1920), acting as a surrogate father and encouraging his social life. He encouraged the Duke of York's courtship of Lady Elizabeth Bowes-Lyon, which was ultimately to have significant consequences for Greig's relations with the Duke. While he was made a CVO (26 April 1923) for his services, Elizabeth, as Duchess of York, gradually displaced him as an intimate of the Duke. Ultimately, Greig was omitted from a royal tour of the Balkans and consequently resigned his equerryship. However, he was created a Gentleman Usher in Ordinary on 1 March 1924. Greig's subsequent life was uneventful. He successfully joined J&A Scrimgeour (a firm connected with his wife) as a stockbroker. In 1932 he was appointed Deputy Ranger of Richmond Park, and he and his family took up residence at Thatched House Lodge.

He went into a brief eclipse under King Edward VIII, who disliked him, and resigned his ushership on 21 July 1936. However, upon the accession of his friend, King George VI, he was appointed an Extra Gentleman Usher (1 March 1937), and was also elected chairman of Wimbledon. He rejoined the RAF in 1939, serving as a liaison with the Air Ministry and reaching the rank of group captain. He was operated on for cancer in 1952, but succumbed in early 1953 and was buried in Ham, Surrey.

== Political activities ==
Greig formed a friendship with the Labour Party leader Ramsay MacDonald. He played a small role in the formation of the National Government in 1931, and was appointed KBE on 3 June 1932, in which year he was also appointed Deputy Ranger of Richmond Park.

He was a vocal opponent of appeasement. He told the Oregonian newspaper in Portland, Oregon ‘We are pushing our armament programmes as rapidly as we can, because in Europe as it is today we believe in the strong man armed’.

He helped a number of Jewish families find asylum in Britain. Painter Joseph Oppenheimer would have found it impossible to leave Germany without his help and that of Sir John Lavery.

== Sources ==
- Bath, Richard (ed.) The Scotland Rugby Miscellany (Vision Sports Publishing Ltd, 2007; ISBN 1-905326-24-6)
- Biography of Louis Greig - Louis and the Prince - by grandson Geordie Greig, published in 1999 by Hodder and Stoughton ISBN 0-340-72883-3
- Goodwin, Terry Complete Who's Who of International Rugby (Cassell, 1987; ISBN 0-7137-1838-2)
- Ziegler, Philip (2004). "Greig, Sir Louis Leisler (1880–1953)". Oxford Dictionary of National Biography. Oxford Dictionary of National Biography (online ed.). Oxford University Press. doi:10.1093/ref:odnb/72391. (Subscription, Wikipedia Library access or UK public library membership required.) (subscription required)
