= Robert Miln Neill =

Scottish rugby union player

- Born: Robert Miln Neill; 5 September 1882 Scotland
- Died: 14 September 1914 (aged 32) Kuala Lumpur, Malaysia
- School: Edinburgh Academy
- Occupation: Chartered accountant

Rugby union career
Amateur team(s)
Years	Team	Apps	(Points)
1897-8	Edinburgh Academicals RFC		
International career
Years	Team	Apps	(Points)
1901	Scotland		
1903	British and Irish Lions		

Robert Miln Neil (5 September 1882 – 14 September 1914) was a Scottish international rugby union player, who played for Scotland and the Lions. He went to Edinburgh Academy and also played for Edinburgh Academicals. He was on the 1903 British Lions tour to South Africa. Gillespie was a chartered accountant by profession; he died in Kuala Lumpur, Malaya of appendicitis.
