= J. C. Hosack =

British Lions international rugby union player

J.C. Hosack was a Scottish international rugby union player, who played for the Lions. He was one of a handful of players who was never capped for his country, who became Lions, in this case, Scotland.

He also played for Edinburgh Wanderers.

He was on the 1903 British Lions tour to South Africa.
