= Ron Rogers (rugby union) =

English rugby union player

Ron Rogers (18 December 1883 – 28 June 1915) was a rugby union player, who represented Great Britain against New Zealand. He died at Krithia, Gallipoli, Ottoman Turkey during World War I.
