= Robert Alexander (Irish sportsman) =

British Lions & Ireland international rugby union player and cricketer

- Born: 24 September 1910 Belfast, Ireland
- Died: 19 July 1943 (aged 32) Simeto River, near Catania, Sicily, Italy
- University: Queen's University Belfast

Rugby union career
- Position: Flanker
Senior career
Years	Team	Apps	(Points)
- RUC
–	North of Ireland F.C.		
Provincial / State sides
Years	Team	Apps	(Points)
- Ulster
International career
Years	Team	Apps	(Points)
1936-1939	Ireland	11	(3)
1938	British Lions	3	
–	Barbarians		
- Cricket career

Cricket information

International information
- National side: Ireland
- Test debut: 18 June 1932 v Scotland

Domestic team information
- Years: Team
- Queen's University CC
- North of Ireland CC

Captain Robert Alexander (24 September 1910 – 19 July 1943) was an Irish rugby union and cricket player who represented Ireland at both sports during the 1930s. He also played rugby for both the British Lions and the Barbarians. Alexander, an RUC officer, was killed in action during the Second World War while serving with the Royal Inniskilling Fusiliers.

== Rugby international ==
=== Ireland ===
Between 1936 and 1939 Alexander made 11 appearances and scored 1 try for Ireland. He made his debut in a 6–3 win against England on 8 February 1936 at Lansdowne Road. On 27 February 1937, again at Lansdowne, he scored his one try for Ireland in an 11–4 win against Scotland. He made his last appearance for Ireland on 11 March 1939 in a 7–0 defeat against Wales at Ravenhill.

=== British Lions ===
In 1938 Alexander, together with fellow Ireland international Paddy Mayne, was also a member of the British Lions squad that went on a tour of South Africa.

== Cricket international ==
As a cricketer, Alexander was a right-handed batsman and a right-arm fast-medium bowler. He played once for Ireland in a first-class match against Scotland on 18 June 1932

== See also ==
- List of Irish cricket and rugby union players
