= Robertson Smyth =

British Lions & Ireland international rugby union player

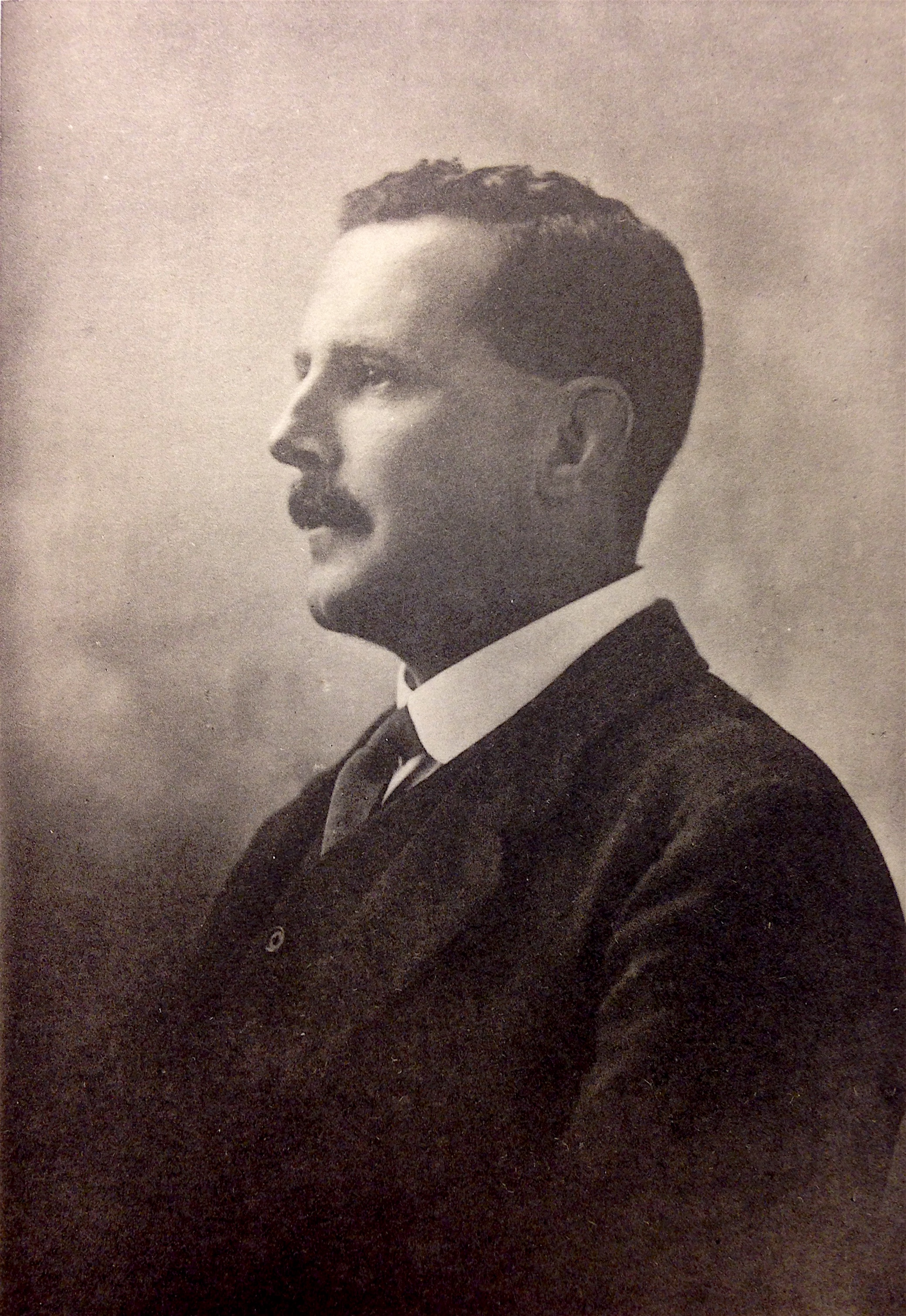
- Born: 18 August 1879 Banbridge, County Down, Ireland
- Died: 5 April 1916 (aged 36) London, England
- School: Dungannon Royal School
- University: Trinity College, Dublin

Rugby union career
- Position: Forward
Amateur team(s)
| Years | Team | Apps | (Points) |
- Dublin University
Senior career
| Years | Team | Apps | (Points) |
| 1902 | Barbarians | 2 | (0) |
| 1904– | Wanderers | | |
International career
| Years | Team | Apps | (Points) |
| 1903–1904 | Ireland | 3 | |
| 1903 | Great Britain | 3 | |
- Military career
- Burial place: Banbridge Municipal Cemetery
- Allegiance: United Kingdom
- Branch: British Army
- Service years: 1905–1916
- Rank: Major
- Unit: Royal Army Medical Corps
- Conflicts: World War I; Western Front
- Awards: Mentioned in despatches

Major Robertson "Robbie" Stewart Smyth (18 August 1879 – 5 April 1916) was an international rugby player, who represented Ireland and Great Britain. Born in County Down, Ireland, he went to Dungannon Royal School, then studied medicine at Trinity College, Dublin, where he obtained his doctorate in 1904. After a year as house surgeon at Sir Patrick Dun's Hospital, he was commissioned into the Royal Army Medical Corps in 1906, and went to India the following year.

Smyth captained the Dublin University 1st XV, and earned his first of three caps for Ireland, against England, in 1903. He was then invited to join the British Isles tour to South Africa, and played in all three test matches. He also played for the Barbarians on two occasions in 1902, and, after graduating from Trinity College, he played with Wanderers.

At the outbreak of the First World War, Smyth went to the Western Front, and remained there until December 1915, when he was invalided by exposure to gas, and retired to London. He was mentioned in despatches. Having given up his commission, he died a few months later in April 1916.

== Early life ==
Robertson Smyth was born on 18 August 1879 in Banbridge, County Down, Ireland. He attended Dungannon Royal School and then Trinity College, Dublin.

== Rugby career ==
Smyth was invited to play for the Barbarians on two occasions in 1902: against Penarth on 28 March, winning 11–0; and Swansea on 1 April, losing 17–0.

In his second year at Dublin University, Smyth was selected for the 1st XV, and elected captain of the team for the 1902–1903 season. That same season he earned his first cap for Ireland against England on 14 February 1903, and was selected again to play two weeks later against Scotland.

In response to an invitation from the South African Rugby Board, it was decided by the Rugby Football Union to send a team to South Africa, and on 27 May, George Rowland Hill, honorary secretary of the Union, announced the team for the tour to South Africa, Smyth amongst them. He played in all three tests against South Africa, the first two being drawn, but the British Isles losing the third.

Smyth was selected for Ireland to play one more game, against England on 13 February 1904 away at Blackheath. England had lost all three games of the Home Nations championship in 1903, but after obtaining a draw against Wales in January 1904, its prospects against Ireland looked stronger. The Irish forwards contingent, including Smyth, was regarded as 'very strong', all eight of them having played international rugby, but the backs appeared weaker.

After Smyth graduated from Dublin University in 1904, he played rugby for Wanderers, and was part of the team that won the Leinster Senior Cup in 1906.

=== International appearances ===
For Ireland:

| Opposition | Score | Result | Date | Venue | Ref(s) |
|---|---|---|---|---|---|
| England | 6–0 | Won | 14 February 1903 | Lansdowne Road | |
| Scotland | 3–0 | Lost | 28 February 1903 | Inverleith | |
| England | 19–0 | Lost | 13 February 1904 | Blackheath | |

For British Isles:

| Opposition | Score | Result | Date | Venue | Ref(s) |
|---|---|---|---|---|---|
| South Africa | 10–10 | Draw | 26 August 1903 | Johannesburg | |
| South Africa | 0–0 | Draw | 5 September 1903 | Kimberley | |
| South Africa | 8–0 | Lost | 12 September 1903 | Cape Town | |

== Military service ==
After obtaining his medical degree in 1904, Smyth passed selection for the Royal Army Medical Corps (RAMC): at the start of the 20th century, many Irish doctors joined the British armed forces. Before joining, he was seconded by the War Office to Sir Patrick Dun's Hospital, where he was appointed house surgeon in 1905. He took up his commission as lieutenant on 2 January 1906, confirmed 1 July, and went to India in 1907. He was promoted to Captain on 31 January 1909. At the outbreak of the First World War, Smyth went to the Western Front in September 1914. Effective 15 October 1915, Smyth was promoted to Major. He served there until December 1915, when he was invalided due to exposure. Returning to London, he was mentioned in despatches in January 1916. Smyth retired, effective 22 February 1916 on a gratuity. He died a few months later, on 5 April, from the effects of the exposure.

== See also ==
- List of international rugby union players killed in action during the First World War
