= Dai Williams (rugby union) =

South African rugby union player

- Full name: David Owen Williams
- Born: 16 June 1913 Mowbray, South Africa
- Died: 24 December 1975 (aged 62) Wynberg, South Africa
- Height: 6 ft 1 in (185 cm)

Rugby union career
- Position: Wing
Provincial / State sides
Years	Team	Apps	(Points)
1932–43	Western Province		
International career
Years	Team	Apps	(Points)
1937–38	South Africa	8	(15)

David Owen Williams (16 June 1913 – 24 December 1975) was a South African international rugby union player.

Born in the Cape Town suburb of Mowbray, Williams was of Welsh descent through his father, a Welsh speaking emigrant from Brecon. He attended Diocesan College in Cape Town and was a Western Province long jump champion.

Williams, a speedy winger, won his first Springboks call up as an 18-year old injury replacement on the 1931–32 tour of Britain and Ireland, though still uncapped at provincial level. He appeared in three tour matches, scoring a try against Llanelli, but a broken collarbone ruled him out of Test contention.

In 1937, Williams made his second Springboks touring squad, playing five Tests in Australia and New Zealand. He scored two tries against the All Blacks, as the Springboks gave the New Zealand side their first ever home series defeat.

Williams played all three Tests against the 1938 British Lions, starring in the 1st Test with two tries.

== See also ==
- List of South Africa national rugby union players
