= 1938 British Lions tour to South Africa =

British's and Irish's official eleventh tour

- Date: 11 June – 21 September
- Coach: Major B. C. Hartley
- Tour captain: (Ireland) Sam Walker
- Test series winners: South Africa (2–1)
- Top test point scorer: (Wales) Vivian Jenkins (9)
Summary
P	W	D	L
Total
24	17	0	7
Test match
3	1	0	2
Opponent
P	W	D	L
South Africa
3	1	0	2

Tour chronology
- ← Argentina 1936 New Zealand and Australia 1950 →

The 1938 British Isles tour to South Africa was the fourteenth tour by a British Isles team and the sixth to South Africa. The tour is retrospectively classed as one of the British Lions tours, as the Lions naming convention was not adopted until 1950.

The tour party was led by Ireland's Sam Walker and managed by Col. Hartley, and took in 24 matches. Of the 24 games, 19 were against club or invitational teams, three were test matches against the South African national team and the other two games were outside South Africa against Rhodesia. The British Isles lost two and won one of the test matches, and in the non-test games lost five and won sixteen.

Like many of the early Lions parties, the tour did not represent the best of British and Irish rugby talent. Obvious omissions included Wilf Wooller and Cliff Jones.

== Touring party ==
- Manager: Col. Bernard Charles Hartley

=== Full Backs ===
- Vivian Jenkins (London Welsh)
- Charles Grieve (Oxford University and Scotland)

=== Three-Quarters ===
- Jim Unwin (Rosslyn Park)
- Bill Clement (Llanelli)
- Elvet Jones (Llanelli)
- Vesey Boyle (Dublin University)
- Roy Leyland (Waterloo)
- Duncan Macrae (St. Andrew's University)
- Harry McKibbin (Queen's University, Belfast)
- Basil Nicholson (Old Whitgiftians)

=== Half backs ===
- Jeff Reynolds (Old Cranleighans)
- George Cromey (Queen's University, Belfast)
- Jimmy Giles (Coventry)
- Haydn Tanner (Swansea)
- George J Morgan (Clontarf)

=== Forwards ===
- Sam Walker (Instonians) (captain)
- Eddie Morgan (Swansea)
- Bill Howard (Old Birkonians)
- William 'Bunner' Travers (Newport)
- Bob Graves (Wanderers)
- Paddy Mayne (Queen's University)
- Gerald "Beef" Thomas Dancer (Bedford)
- Stanley Couchman (Old Cranleighans)
- Griff Purchas (Coventry)
- Jock Waters (Selkirk)
- Laurie Duff (Glasgow Academicals)
- Ivor Williams (Cardiff)
- Russell Taylor (Cross Keys)
- Robert Alexander (North of Ireland)

== Match summary ==
Complete list of matches played by the British Isles in South Africa:

Test matches

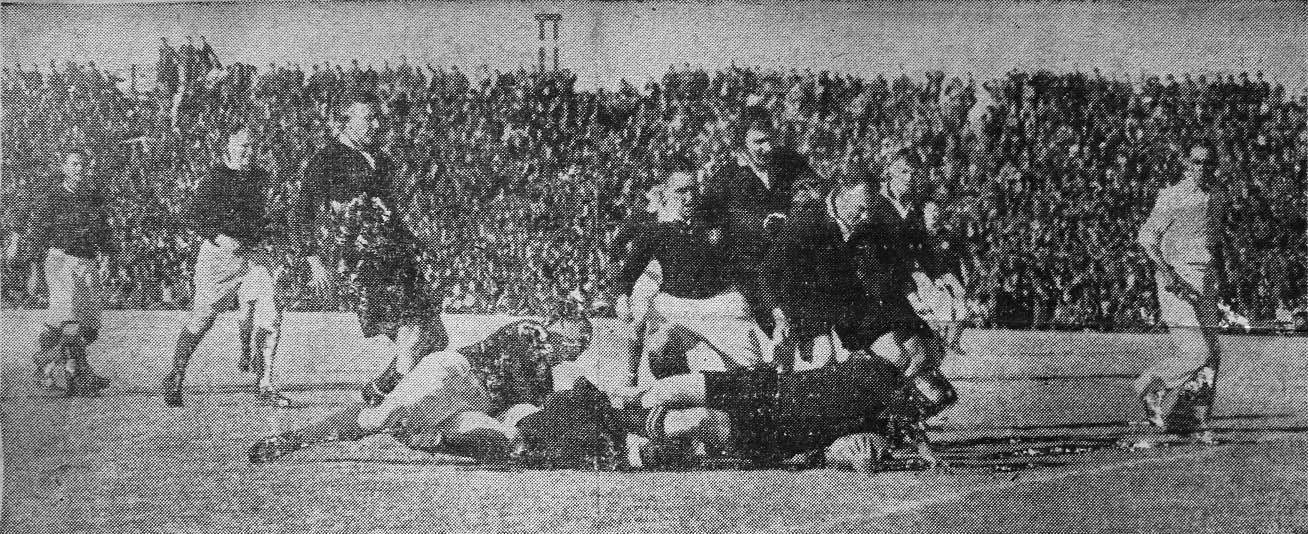
The first test v South Africa, played on August 6 at Ellis Park

#	Date	Rival	City	Venue	Result	Score
1	11 Jun	Border Bulldogs	East London		Won	11–8
2	15 Jun	Griqualand West	Kimberley		Won	22–9
3	18 Jun	Western Province	Cape Town	Newlands	Lost	8–11
4	22 Jun	South Western Districts	Oudtshoorn	Recreation Ground	Won	19–10
5	25 Jun	Western Province	Cape Town	Newlands	Lost	11–21
6	29 Jun	Western Transvaal	Potchefstroom	Olën Park	Won	26–9
7	2 Jul	Orange Free State	Bloemfontein		Won	21–6
8	6 Jul	Orange Free State Country	Kroonstad	Loubser Park	Won	18–3
9	9 Jul	Transvaal	Johannesburg	Ellis Park	Lost	9–16
10	13 Jul	Northern Transvaal	Pretoria	Caledonian Ground	Won	20–12
11	16 Jul	Cape Province	Kimberley		Won	10–3
12	20 Jul	(Southern Rhodesia) Rhodesia	Salisbury		Won	25–11
13	23 Jul	(Southern Rhodesia) Rhodesia	Bulawayo		Won	45–11
14	30 Jul	Transvaal	Johannesburg	Ellis Park	Won	17–9
15	6 Aug	South Africa	Johannesburg	Ellis Park	Lost	12–26
16	13 Aug	Northern Province	Durban	Kingsmead Cricket	Lost	8–26
17	17 Aug	Natal	Pietermaritzburg		Won	15–11
18	20 Aug	Border Bulldogs	East London		Won	19–11
19	24 Aug	North-East Districts	Burgersdorp		Won	42–3
20	27 Aug	Eastern Province	Port Elizabeth	St George's Park	Won	6–5
21	3 Sep	South Africa	Port Elizabeth	St George's Park	Lost	3–19
22	10 Sep	South Africa	Cape Town	Newlands Stadium	Won	21–16
23	17 Sep	Western Province Universities	Cape Town	Newlands Stadium	Won	19–16
24	21 Sep	Western Province Country	Cape Town	Newlands Stadium	Lost	7–12

Balance
Pl	W	D	L	Ps	Pc
24	17	0	7	414	284

== Test details ==
=== First Test ===
6 August 1938

South Africa	26–12	(United Kingdom) British Isles
Try: Harris; Williams (2); Louw; Con: Brand (4); Pen: Brand (2)	Report	Pen: Jenkins (3); Taylor

Ellis Park, Johannesburg
Attendance: 36,000
Referee: A.M. Horak

South Africa	British Isles

South Africa: G.H Brand, F.G Turner, G.P Lochner, P de Wet, D.O Williams, T.A Harris, D.H Craven (Captain), S.C Louw, J.W Lotz, M.M Louw, B.A du Toit, W.F Bergh, A.R Sherriff, W.E Bastard, L.C Strachan
British Isles: V..G.J Jenkins, E.J Unwin, D.J Macrae, H.R McKibbon, E.L Jones, F.J Reynolds, J.L Giles, M.E Morgan, C.R.A Graves, G.T Dancer, S Walker (Captain), R.B Mayne, R. Alexander, W.G Howard, A.R
