= William Patrick Scott =

British Lions & Scotland international rugby union player

Bill Scott
- Born: William Patrick Scott; 1 March 1880 Wishaw, Scotland
- Died: 1 June 1948 (aged 68)
- School: Fettes College

Rugby union career
- Position: Forward
Amateur team(s)
Years	Team	Apps	(Points)
- West of Scotland
Provincial / State sides
Years	Team	Apps	(Points)
- Glasgow District
International career
Years	Team	Apps	(Points)
1900-07	Scotland	21	
1903	British and Irish Lions	22	(9)
–	Barbarians		

56th President of the Scottish Rugby Union
- In office 1935–1936
- Preceded by: Mark Coxon Morrison
- Succeeded by: Alfred Lawrie

William Patrick Scott (1 March 1880 – 1 June 1948) was a Scotland international rugby union player who played as a forward.

== Rugby Union career ==
=== Amateur career ===
Scott was born in Wishaw, and went to Fettes College.

He played for West of Scotland.

=== Provincial career ===
Scott played for Glasgow District. He played in the 1902-03 Inter-City match against Edinburgh District. He match ended in a nil-nil draw.

=== International career ===
Scott was capped for Scotland.

He was also capped for the British and Irish Lions. He went on the 1903 British Lions tour to South Africa.

He was also selected for the Barbarians.

=== Administrative career ===
Scott was president of the Scottish Rugby Union between 1935 and 1935.

== Outside of rugby ==
Scott was a distiller.
