= Basil Nicholson =

British Lions & England international rugby union player

- Full name: Basil Ellard Nicholson
- Born: 1 January 1913 Lewisham, London, England
- Died: 20 August 1985 (aged 72) Oxted, Surrey, England
- School: Whitgift School

Rugby union career
- Position: Centre
International career
Years	Team	Apps	(Points)
1938	England	2	(3)
1938	British Lions	1	(0)

Basil Ellard Nicholson (1 January 1913 – 20 August 1985) was an English international rugby union player.

Born in Lewisham, London, Nicholson was one of six siblings and attended Whitgift School, where he made the 1st XV aged 14, then after leaving turned out for Old Whitgiftians. He later studied engineering at London University.

Nicholson, a fast and elusive centre, was a regular in the Surrey county sides of the 1930s. While playing with Harlequins in 1938, Nicholson got called up by England for their Home Nations campaign, gaining caps in away matches against Wales and Ireland. He also made the British Lions squad for the 1938 tour of South Africa and appeared in the second of the three Test fixtures, against the Springboks in Port Elizabeth. A leg injury picked up during the match ruled him out of the final Test, which he had been expected to feature in as a wing three-quarter.

== See also ==
- List of British & Irish Lions players
- List of England national rugby union players
