= Joseph Wallace (rugby union) =

Irish rugby union player

- Born: 3 August 1878 Dromakeenan, Roscrea, Ireland
- Died: 29 January 1967 (aged 88) Roscrea, Ireland

Rugby union career
- Position: Forward
International career
Years	Team	Apps	(Points)
1903–06	Ireland	10	(12)
1903	British Lions	3	(0)

Joseph Wallace (3 August 1878 — 29 January 1967) was an Irish international rugby union player.

Born in Dromakeenan, Roscrea, Wallace was one of two rugby playing brothers who were capped as forwards for Ireland and toured with the British Lions. His sibling James was the eldest of the pair, but made the national team after Joseph. Both brothers attended Rutland School, Athlone, and Trinity College, Dublin. He competed on Trinity's first XV from 1901 to 1903 and otherwise played his rugby for Dublin-based club Wanderers.

Wallace debuted for Ireland in the 1903 Home Nations and mid-year made the British Lions tour of South Africa, where he featured in all three matches against the Springboks. He gained a total of 10 Ireland caps between 1903 and 1906. On his last match, against Wales, Wallace stood in as scrum-half and scored a try.

A medical doctor, Wallace also coached rugby at Cistercian College, Roscrea, and was IRFU president in 1934–35.

== See also ==
- List of Ireland national rugby union players
