= 1962 Five Nations Championship =

Rugby union competition

- Date: 13 January - 17 November 1962
- Countries: England; Ireland; France; Scotland; Wales

Tournament statistics
- Champions: France (3rd title)
- Matches played: 10

The 1962 Five Nations Championship was the thirty-third series of the rugby union Five Nations Championship. Including the previous incarnations as the Home Nations and Five Nations, this was the sixty-eighth series of the northern hemisphere rugby union championship. Ten matches were played between 13 January and 17 November. It was contested by England, France, Ireland, Scotland and Wales.

A smallpox epidemic in South Wales in March and April caused the match between Ireland and Wales to be postponed until November 1962.

== Participants ==
The teams involved were:

Nation	Venue	City	Captain
England	Twickenham	London	Dickie Jeeps
France	Stade Olympique Yves-du-Manoir	Colombes	Pierre Lacroix
Ireland	Lansdowne Road	Dublin	Bill Mulcahy
Scotland	Murrayfield	Edinburgh	Arthur Smith
Wales	National Stadium	Cardiff	Lloyd Williams/Bryn Meredith

== Table ==
Pos	Team	Pld	W	D	L	PF	PA	PD	Pts
1	France	4	3	0	1	35	6	+29	6
2	Scotland	4	2	1	1	34	23	+11	5
3	England	4	1	2	1	19	16	+3	4
3	Wales	4	1	2	1	9	11	−2	4
5	Ireland	4	0	1	3	9	50	−41	1

== Results ==
1962-01-13

Scotland	3–11	France

Edinburgh

1962-01-20

England	0–0	Wales

London

1962-02-03

Wales	3–8	Scotland

Cardiff

1962-02-10

England	16–0	Ireland

London

1962-02-24

France	13–0	England

Paris

1962-02-24

Ireland	6–20	Scotland

Dublin

1962-03-17

Scotland	3–3	England

Edinburgh

1962-03-24

Wales	3–0	France

Cardiff

1962-04-14

France	11–0	Ireland

Paris

1962-11-17

Ireland	3–3	Wales

Dublin
