= 1962 British Lions tour to South Africa =

- Date: 26 May – 28 August
- Coach: Harry McKibbin
- Tour captain: (Scotland) Arthur Smith
- Test series winners: South Africa (3–0)
- Top test point scorer: (England) John Willcox (5)
Summary
P	W	D	L
Total
25	16	4	5
Test match
4	0	1	3
Opponent
P	W	D	L
South Africa
4	0	1	3

Tour chronology
- ← Australia and New Zealand 1959 Australia and New Zealand 1966 →

In 1962 the British Lions rugby union team toured Southern and Eastern Africa. Overall the tourists played twenty-five matches, winning sixteen, losing five and drawing four.

The Lions were unsuccessful in the test series against South Africa, losing by three matches to nil with one match drawn. The first three tests were close; the first match was drawn 3–3 and South Africa won the second 3–0 and the third 8–3. The fourth test resulted in a bigger win for South Africa, 34–14.

The tour included games against Rhodesia (which would become Zimbabwe), South West Africa (future Namibia, then part of South Africa) and East Africa in Kenya; winning all three. The Lions won all their non-international matches except for those against Northern Transvaal and Eastern Transvaal.

The touring party was captained by Arthur Smith. The manager was Brian Vaughan and the assistant manager was Harry McKibbin.

== Squad ==
=== Management ===
- Manager D. B. Vaughan (England)
- Coach H. R. McKibbin (Ireland)

=== Backs ===
- Dewi Bebb (Swansea and Wales)
- Niall Brophy (University College Dublin and Ireland)
- H. J. C Brown (Blackheath and RAF)
- John Dee (Hartlepool Rovers and England)
- Ronnie Cowan (Selkirk and Scotland)
- David Hewitt (Queen's University RFC and Ireland)
- Raymond Hunter (CIYMS and Ireland)
- Dickie Jeeps (Northampton and England)
- Ken Jones (Llanelli and Wales)
- Tom Kiernan (University College Cork R.F.C. and Ireland)
- Tony O'Connor (Aberavon and Wales)
- Richard Sharp (Oxford University and England)
- Arthur Smith (Edinburgh Wanderers and Scotland)
- Gordon Waddell (London Scottish and Scotland)
- Mike Weston (Durham City and England)
- John Willcox (Oxford University and England)

=== Forwards ===
- Mike Campbell-Lamerton (London Scottish, Army and Scotland)
- Glyn Davidge (Newport and Wales)
- John Douglas (Stewart's College FP and Scotland)
- Bert Godwin (Coventry and England)
- Stan Hodgson (Durham City and England)
- Kingsley Jones (Cardiff and Wales)
- Willie John McBride (Ballymena and Ireland)
- Bryn Meredith (Newport and Wales)
- Syd Millar (Ballymena and Ireland)
- Haydn Morgan (Abertillery and Wales)
- Bill Mulcahy (Bohemians and Ireland)
- David Nash (Ebbw Vale and Wales)
- Alun Pask (Abertillery and Wales)
- Budge Rogers (Bedford and England)
- David Rollo (Howe of Fife and Scotland)
- Keith Rowlands (Cardiff and Wales)
- Peter Wright (Blackheath and England)

== Results ==
Scores and results list British Lions' points tally first.

Opposing Team	For	Against	Date	Venue	Status
Rhodesia	38	9	26 May 1962	Hartsfield Ground, Salisbury	Tour match
Giqualand West	8	8	31 May 1962	De Beers Diamond Oval, Kimberley	Tour match
Western Transvaal	11	6	2 June 1962	Olen Park, Potchefstroom	Tour match
Southern University	14	11	6 June 1962	Newlands, Cape Town	Tour match
Boland	25	8	9 June 1962	Boland Stadium, Wellington	Tour match
South West Africa	14	6	12 June 1962	South West Stadium, Windhoek	Tour match
Northern Transvaal	6	14	16 June 1962	Loftus Versfeld, Pretoria	Tour match
South Africa	3	3	23 June 1962	Ellis Park, Johannesburg	Test Match
Natal	13	3	27 June 1962	Kings Park, Durban	Tour match
Eastern Province	21	6	30 June 1962	Boet Erasmus, Port Elizabeth	Tour match
Orange Free State	14	14	4 July 1962	Free State Stadium, Bloemfontein	Tour match
Junior Springboks	16	11	7 July 1962	Loftus Versfeld, Pretoria	Tour match
Combined Services	20	6	11 July 1962	Olen Park, Potchefstroom	Tour match
Western Province	21	13	14 July 1962	Newlands, Cape Town	Tour match
South West Districts	11	3	17 July 1962		Tour match
South Africa	0	3	21 July 1962	Kings Park, Durban	Test Match
Northern Universities	6	6	25 July 1962	PAM Brink, Springs	Tour match
Transvaal	24	3	28 July 1962	Ellis Park, Johannesburg	Tour match
South Africa	3	8	4 August 1962	Newlands, Cape Town	Test Match
North Eastern Districts	34	8	8 August 1962	Danie Craven St., Stellenbosch	Tour match
Border	5	0	11 August 1962	Buffalo City St., East London	Tour match
Central University	14	6	15 August 1962	Boet Erasmus, Port Elizabeth	Tour match
Eastern Transvaal	16	19	18 August 1962	PAM Brink, Springs	Tour match
South Africa	14	34	25 August 1962	Free State Stadium, Bloemfontein	Test Match
East Africa	50	0	28 August 1962	RFUEA Ground, Nairobi	Tour match
