= Sam Walker (rugby union) =

Irish rugby union player (1912–1972)

- Born: Samuel Walker; 21 April 1912 Belfast, Ireland
- Died: 20 January 1972 (aged 59) Belfast, Northern Ireland
- Occupation: Banker

Rugby union career
- Position: Prop
Senior career
Years	Team	Apps	(Points)
1934-1938	Instonians		
1934-?	Barbarian F.C.		
International career
Years	Team	Apps	(Points)
1934–1938	Ireland	15	(7)
1938	British Isles XV	3	(0)

Samuel "Sam" Walker (21 April 1912 – 20 January 1972) was an Irish rugby union player. Walker played club rugby for Instonians and played international rugby for Ireland and was captain of the British Isles team in their 1938 tour of South Africa.

== Rugby career ==
Walker came to note as a rugby player when he represented Instonians. During the 1934/35 season, he was also selected to play for invitational tourists, the Barbarians. He won his first international cap when he was selected for the Irish national team during the 1934 Home Nations Championship. he won 15 caps for his country between 1934 and 1938, and captained the team in his final international game, against Wales, at Swansea.

In 1938, he was selected to captain the British & Irish Lions team on their tour of South Africa. He is recognised as an able captain, who managed to sustain good morale in a Lions team that was devastated by injuries. He also fostered an open style of play that resulted in exciting and free scoring matches, which delighted the South African spectators. Walker showed excellent fitness himself during the tour, and was able to lead the British & Irish Lions team out for 17 invitational games and all three Tests against the South African national team. On the tour he usually played his favoured role as prop, alongside Bunner Travers.
