= Jeff Reynolds (rugby union) =

British Lions & England international rugby union player

- Full name: Frank Jeffrey Reynolds
- Born: 2 January 1916 Canton, China
- Died: 29 July 1996 (aged 80) Somerset West, South Africa
- School: Cranleigh School

Rugby union career
- Position: Stand-off
International career
Years	Team	Apps	(Points)
1937–38	England	3	(7)
1938	British Lions	2	(0)

Frank Jeffrey Reynolds (2 January 1916 – 29 July 1996) was an English international rugby union player.

The son of a doctor, Reynolds was born in Canton, China, and learned his rugby at Cranleigh School, where he was made into a stand-off. He captained England schoolboys in a match against their Scottish rivals.

Reynolds was commissioned from Sandhurst into the Duke of Wellington's Regiment in 1936.

An Old Cranleighans player, Reynolds made his England debut in their final 1937 Home Nations fixture, a win over Scotland at Murrayfield that secured the Triple Crown. He was capped a further two times in 1938 and toured South Africa with the British Lions that year, featuring in the first two Test matches.

In addition to rugby, Reynolds also played field hockey for Sussex and cricket for the Kent 2nd XI.

Reynolds served in North Africa during World War II and became Squadron Commander. He was later mentioned in dispatches serving with the 1st Battalion in Palestine.

Emigrating to South Africa in 1951, Reynolds was manager of the Rand Club in Johannesburg.

== See also ==
- List of British & Irish Lions players
- List of England national rugby union players
