= Fairy Heatlie =

South African rugby union player (1872–1951)

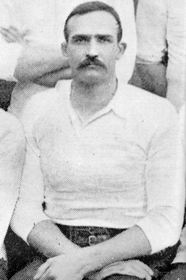
- Born: Barry Heatlie; April 25, 1872 Worcester, Cape Colony
- Died: August 19, 1951 (aged 79) Cape Town, Cape Province Union of South Africa
- Height: 1.90 m (6 ft 3 in)
- Weight: 94 kg (207 lb)

Rugby union career
- Position: Lock
Amateur team(s)
Years	Team	Apps	(Points)
- Old Diocesans
Provincial / State sides
Years	Team	Apps	(Points)
	Western Province	34	
International career
Years	Team	Apps	(Points)
1896–1903	South Africa	6	(6)
1910	Argentina	1	(0)
- Correct as of 15 October 2007

Barry "Fairy" Heatlie (25 April 1872 – 19 August 1951) was a rugby union player, representing both South Africa and Argentina. He was the fifth captain of the South African rugby union team and is attributed as the man who gave the Springboks their famous green jersey.

His contributions to the early development of South African rugby were recognised in 2009 with his induction into the IRB Hall of Fame.

== See also ==
- South African rugby union captains

== Bibliography ==
- Difford, Ivor The History of South African Rugby
- Clayton, Keith Legends of South African Rugby
- Dobsin, Paul Bishops Rugby
- Parker, A.C. W.P.Centenary 1883 - 1983
- Craven, Danie Springbok Annals 1891 - 1964
- Dobson, Paul Rugby in South Africa 1861 - 1988
- Greyvenstein, Chris Springbok Rugby: An Illustrated History
- Parker, A.C. The Springboks 1891 - 1970
- Stent, R.K. 100 Years of Rugby
- Dobson, Paul 30 Super Springboks
