= Arthur Smith (rugby union) =

Scotland international rugby union player

- Born: Arthur Robert Smith; 23 January 1933 Castle Douglas, Scotland
- Died: 3 February 1975 (aged 42) Edinburgh, Scotland
- University: Glasgow University; Cambridge University

Rugby union career
- Position: Wing
Amateur team(s)
Years	Team	Apps	(Points)
- Cambridge University
–	Glasgow University		
–	London Scottish		
–	Gosforth		
–	Ebbw Vale		
–	Edinburgh Wanderers		
–	Barbarians		
International career
Years	Team	Apps	(Points)
1955-62	Scotland	33	

Arthur Robert Smith (23 January 1933 – 3 February 1975) was a Scotland international rugby union player. He played as a Wing.

== Rugby Union career ==
=== Amateur career ===
Originally from Castle Douglas in Kirkcudbrightshire in Scotland, he graduated in mathematics at Glasgow University and then gained a PhD at Gonville and Caius College, Cambridge. He represented Cambridge in four Varsity Matches from 1954 to 1957 inclusive. It was at Cambridge that he came to flourish as a player.

Smith played for a number of sides including Glasgow University, Cambridge University, London Scottish F C, Gosforth, Ebbw Vale, Edinburgh Wanderers and Barbarians FC (the latter on their famous 1957 Easter tour of Wales, when they beat Cardiff RFC 40–0). One of the clubs that Arthur played for was Ebbw Vale, in Wales, and it is rumoured that having been selected by the British Lions that he played a game for Ebbw Vale under another name because Lions were banned from playing after Easter.

=== International career ===
He captained both Scotland and the British Lions. He won 33 caps for Scotland and was never dropped until his retirement in 1962, although he did miss some matches due to injury. He also became Scotland's captain, which is a rare honour for a winger.

His debut was in 1955, a Dark Age for Scottish rugby, as the national team had just lost seventeen tests in a row. Smith helped to break this losing streak by scoring a try in a 35–10 defeat of Wales at Murrayfield, which was probably one of the biggest upsets in post-war rugby.

Smith also captained the 1960 Scotland rugby union tour of South Africa, the first major tour undertaken by a Home Union, and scored eight points in Scotland's 18–10 loss.

He was twice a British Lion, both times in South Africa (1955 and 1962). Smith did not play in any of the internationals against South Africa in 1955 but he captained the touring party in 1962 and played in the first three internationals before being forced to miss the final match through injury.

== Profiles ==
Richard Bath writes of him that:

"As well as possessing searing pace, the farmer's son from Castle Douglas in Galloway also possessed great intellect and gained a first class degree in maths from Glasgow University before completing his PhD at Cambridge - and all that while winning 33 caps for Scotland."

Allan Massie writes of him that:

"He was a natural rather than a schooled player, for in his youth he had played [association] football, not Rugby; at Glasgow University he was better known as a long jumper than a Rugby player."

"He was never a great improviser, like his contemporary England's Peter Jackson, and for this reason many would have put him in second place among the right wings of his time; and he was not the sort of wing who impressed by his brute force and determination. But he was still a deadly finisher. With the ball in hand his two chief devices were the swerve and the change of pace; I have seen no wing to better his control of pace, nor one with a nicer ability to leave an opposing wing or full-back clutching the air... He was always skilful and resourceful, very rarely prepared to let an attack die. He was a master of that now neglected ploy, the cross-kick, which placed the ball just behind the opposing defence for his forwards to run on to... Those of us who watched Arthur Smith have only to close our eyes to see him slip into top gear, like a thoroughbred racehorse. Nobody has ever worn the Number 14 jersey for Scotland since with quite the same authority."

Sadly, Arthur Smith died of cancer less than ten years after playing his last international.
