= List of uncapped British & Irish Lions rugby union players =

As of 26 June 2017, a total of 165 players uncapped players have made an appearance for the British and Irish Lions, a rugby union team selected from players eligible for any of the Home Nations – the national sides of England, Ireland, Scotland and Wales. The Lions generally select international players, but they can pick uncapped players available to any one of the four unions.

The 165 uncapped players represent approximately 19% of the 888 players who have made an appearance for the Lions. Of the 165 players, 41 were later capped by their national side while 124 were never capped. The most recent uncapped player was Will Greenwood who toured South Africa with the Lions in 1997 before getting his first cap for England later that year. The most recent uncapped player for the Lions who was never capped for his national team was Alun Lewis, who featured on the 1977 Lions tour to New Zealand.

The following is a list of rugby union players who have played for the British and Irish Lions but were never capped for their own countries or adopted countries. Where the country of origin of the player is not known, he is identified by the country of his club. By far the majority of the players on this list seem to originate from England. Players who took part in tours to Argentina are italicised.

Name	Tour	Country of origin	Club	Matches played for Lions	Test Matches played for Lions
John Gordon A'Bear	1936 Argentina	England	Gloucester		
Charlie Adamson	1899 Australia	England	Durham		
Arthur Douglas Allen	1927 Argentina	England	Cambridge University		
Jack Anderton	1888 NZ and Australia	England	Salford		
John Francis Ashby	1910 Argentina	England	Cheshire		
William Joseph Ashby	1910 South Africa	Ireland	Queen's College		
Alan Ayre-Smith	1899 Australia	England	Guy's Hospital		
Tom Banks	1888 NZ and Australia	England	Swinton		
Sydney Pyman Bell	1896 South Africa	England	Cambridge University		
Frederick Belson	1899 Australia	England	Abergavenny, Bristol		
William Gordon MacGregor Bonner	1930 NZ & Australia	England	Bradford		
James Bordass	1924 South Africa	England	Cambridge University		
John Brett	1936 Argentina	England	Oxford University		
Edward Bromet	1891 South Africa	England	Cambridge University		
Herbert Brooks	1888 NZ and Australia	England/ Scotland	Durham, Edinburgh University		
H. John C. Brown	1962 South Africa	England	Blackheath & RAF		
Walter Bumby	1888 NZ and Australia	England	Swinton		
Bob Burnet	1888 NZ and Australia	Scotland	Hawick		
Willie Burnet	1888 NZ and Australia	Scotland	Hawick		
Walter Carey	1896 South Africa	England	Oxford University		
Owen Chadwick	1936 Argentina	England	Cambridge University		
J. "Jack" P. Clowes	1888 NZ and Australia	England	Halifax		
Granville Coghlan	1927 Argentina	England	Cambridge University		
Gilbert Collett	1903 South Africa	England	Oxford University		
George Cookson	1899 Australia	England	Manchester		
Stanley Couchman	1938 South Africa	England	Old Cranleighans		
Edward Crean	1910 South Africa	England	Liverpool		
Sidney Nelson Crowther	1902 Australia and NZ	England	Lennox		
Gerald Thomas "Beef" Dancer	1938 South Africa	England	Bedford		
Percy Robert Diggle	1910 Argentina	England	Oxford University; Cumberland		
Harry Eagles	1888 NZ and Australia	England	Salford		
Guy Evers	1899 Australia	England	Moseley		
J.L. Fisher	1904 Australia & NZ	England	Hull and East Riding		
John Francomb	1899 Australia	England	Manchester, Oxford University		
H.J. Fraser	1910 Argentina	Scotland			
William Lovat Fraser	1910 Argentina	Scotland	Merchistonians		
Edward Newman Fuller	1910 Argentina	England	Cambridge University, Old Merchant Taylors		
W.F. Gaisford	1924 South Africa	England	St Barts		
John Harding Gould	1891 South Africa	England	Old Leysians		
H.G.S. Gray	1899 Australia	Scotland	Coventry		
R.K. Green	1908 NZ and Australia	Wales	Neath		
Rowland Griffiths	1908 NZ and Australia	Wales	Newport		
Thomas Gubb	1927 Argentina	South Africa	Oxford University		
J.T. Haslam	1888 NZ and Australia	England	Halsam		
Johnny Hammond	1891 South Africa & 1896 South Africa	England	Cambridge University, Blackheath		
Edward Montague Harrison	1903 South Africa	England	Guy's Hospital, Middlesex		
Robin Harrison	1910 Argentina	England	Northampton		
Peter Hobbs	1936 Argentina	England	Richmond		
Peter Hordern	1936 Argentina	England	Gloucester		
J.C. Hosack	1903 South Africa	Scotland	Edinburgh Wanderers		
Bill Howard	1938 South Africa	England	Old Birkonians		
Noel Forbes Humphreys	1910 South Africa	Wales	Tynedale		
Walter Legh Huntingford	1910 Argentina	England	United Services, Blackheath		
G.A.M. Isherwood	1910 South Africa	England	Cheshire		
Frederick Stanley Jackson	1908 NZ and Australia	England	Camborne, Leicester		
Roy Jennings	1930 NZ & Australia	England	Redruth		
William Judkins	1899 Australia	England	Coventry		
Gerald Kyrke	1908 NZ and Australia	England	Marlborough Nomads		
A.J. Laing	1888 NZ and Australia	Scotland	Hawick		
Herbert Laxon	1908 NZ and Australia	England	Cambridge University		
G.W. Lee	1896 South Africa	England	Rockcliff		
Alun Lewis	1977 New Zealand	Wales	Cambridge University & London Welsh		
Patrick Francis McEvedy	1904 Australia & NZ & 1908 Australia & NZ	New Zealand	Guy's Hospital		
George Arthren McIlwaine	1927 Argentina	South Africa	Cambridge University		
James Magee	1896 South Africa	Ireland	Bective Rangers		
Jules Malfroy	1927 Argentina	New Zealand	Cambridge University		
Esmond Martelli	1899 Australia	Ireland	Dublin University		
Burnett Staveley Massey	1904 Australia & NZ	England	Hull and East Riding		
Charlie Mathers	1888 NZ and Australia	England	Bramley		
Reginald "Reg" Bellamy Maxwell	1924 South Africa	England	Birkenhead Park		
Edwin Mayfield	1891 South Africa	England	Cambridge University		
S.H. Milnes	1910 Argentina	England	Manchester		
J. S. Moll	1936 Argentina	England	Lloyds Bank		
Harold Gordon Monks	1910 Argentina	England	Liverpool Old Boys, Wigan RFC		
George J. Morgan	1938 South Africa	Ireland	Clontarf		
Matthew Mullineux	1896 South Africa & 1899 Australia	England	Blackheath		
Cuth Mullins	1896 South Africa	Cape Colony (South Africa)	Guy's Hospital		
Johnny Nolan	1888 NZ and Australia	England	Rochdale Hornets		
Arthur O'Brien	1902 Australia and NZ	New Zealand	Guy's Hospital		
C.D. Patterson	1904 Australia & NZ	Ireland	Malone		
A.G. Paul	1888 NZ and Australia	Ireland	Swinton		
A.P. Penketh	1888 NZ and Australia	Isle of Man	Douglas R.U.F.C.		
Theodore Pike	1927 Argentina	Ireland			
Howard Poole	1930 NZ & Australia	Wales	Cardiff		
Denis Pratten	1936 Argentina	England	Blackheath		
Griff Purchas	1938 South Africa	England	Coventry		
T.J. Richards	1910 South Africa	Ireland	Bristol		
William Albert Robertson	1910 South Africa	Scotland	Edinburgh University		
C.O. Robinson	1896 South Africa	England	Northumberland		
Ronald Joseph Rogers	1904 Australia & NZ	England	Bath		
B.G. Roscoe	1891 South Africa	England	Lancashire		
Stuart MacKenzie Saunders	1904 Australia & NZ	England	Guy's Hospital		
J.T. Sharland	1904 Australia & NZ	England	Streatham		
Clement Pearson Simpson	1891 South Africa	England	Cambridge University		
John Smith	1888 NZ and Australia	Scotland	Edinburgh University		
Stanley Herbert Smith	1910 Argentina	England	Cumberland		
Thomas William Smith	1908 NZ and Australia	England	Leicester		
AF Hamilton Smythe	1927 Argentina	England			
Harry Speakman	1888 NZ and Australia	England			
Jack Spoors	1910 South Africa	England	Bristol		
Whalley Stranach	1910 Argentina	England	Guy's Hospital, Kent		
Peter Denny Strang	1910 Argentina	England	Old Merchant Taylors		
Aubone Surtees	1891 South Africa	England	Harlequins		
Len Thomas	1908 NZ and Australia	Wales	Penarth		
Charles Thompson	1899 Australia	England	Manchester		
Robert Thompson	1891 South Africa	Ireland			
William Henry Thorman	1891 South Africa	England	St Thomas' Hospital		
Charles Gordon Timms	1910 South Africa	Scotland	Edinburgh University		
David Trail	1902 Australia and NZ	England	Guy's Hospital		
Donald Troup	1927 Argentina	Scotland	Oxford University		
Martin Tweed	1910 Argentina	England	Guy's Hospital		
Harold Uren	1936 Argentina	England	Waterloo		
R.B. Waddell	1910 Argentina	Scotland	Glasgow Academicals		
Roger Cuthbert Wakefield	1927 Argentina	England	Cambridge University, Harlequins		
Edward Forbes Walker	1903 South Africa	England	Lennox		
William "Bill" Wallace	1924 South Africa	England	Percy Park		
H.E. Ward	1910 Argentina	Unknown	Harlequins, Middlesex		
Thomas Sherren Whittaker	1891 South Africa	England	Manchester		
Gerald Lloyd Williams	1908 NZ and Australia	England	Liverpool		
Ivor Williams	1938 South Africa	Wales	Cardiff		
Sam Williams	1888 NZ and Australia	England			
Kenneth Berridge Wood	1910 South Africa	England	Leicester Tigers		2
Henry Whitehead	1910 Argentina	England	Manchester AC, Lancashire		

== Sources ==
- Bath, Richard (ed.) The Scotland Rugby Miscellany (Vision Sports Publishing Ltd, 2007 ISBN 1-905326-24-6)
- Godwin, Terry Complete Who's Who of International Rugby (Cassell, 1987, ISBN 0-7137-1838-2)
- espnscrum.com
