= 1936 British Lions tour to Argentina =

- Date: 15 July – 23 August
- Coach: (England) Doug Prentice
- Tour captain: (England) Bernard Gadney
- Test series winners: British Isles (1–0)
- Top test point scorer: (England) John Brett (7)
Summary
P	W	D	L
Total
10	10	0	0
Test match
1	1	0	0
Opponent
P	W	D	L
Argentina
1	1	0	0

Tour chronology
- ← New Zealand and Australia 1930 South Africa 1938 →

The 1936 British Lions tour of Argentina was a series of rugby union matches arranged between the British Lions and various Argentine teams. The tourists played ten matches, nine of which were against club and combined teams while one match took in a full Argentina national team. Despite being sanctioned by the International Rugby Board, no caps were awarded to players from either side.

This was the third and final international tour to South America by a combined British team, and although classed as the British Lions, it was predominantly English, with a handful of Scottish and Irish players.

The Lions won all the games played, scoring 399 points and conceding only 12.

== Background ==
By 1936 Argentine rugby was in expansion and growth. Four years earlier, the Junior Springboks had visited the country to play several matches. In 1933 two South African players, Wollie Wolheim and Rybeck Elliot returned to Argentina to play for local team Hindú, which was considered by the Argentine Union as a sort of professionalism and Hindú was suspended for one season.

In 1935 eleven players of San Isidro (the most important rugby team of Argentina by then) were suspended by the club executives. The banned players organised some friendly matches under the name "Abelleyra XV" until they established a new institution, San Isidro Club.

The last Lions tour to Argentina came when former player Douglas Prentice, who had led the team during their tour to New Zealand an Australia in 1930 and was the current manager, arrived with twenty-three players. No Welsh players were part of the team despite Wales had won the Home Nations that year.

The British played only one test v. Argentina at Gimnasia y Esgrima, with a record attendance of 15,000, on August 16. The Lions won by 23–0. The Argentine line-up for that game was Héctor Alfonso; R. Elliot, Herbert Talbot, Horacio Pascuali, Emilio Schiavio; Percy Talbot, Noel Cooper; Jorge Cilley, Gilbert Logan, José Frigoli; J.L. Francombe (cap), Tomás Salzman; Bernardo Mitchelstein, Víctor Inchausti, Archie Cameron.

Belgrano was the only team to score a try against The Lions, when the visiting team won by 37–3.

== Touring party ==
- Doug Prentice (Leicester), Manager
- Dr. Hugh Llewellyn Glyn Hughes (Blackheath), Referee

=== Players ===
- Bernard Gadney (Leicester) Captain
- Charles Beamish (Leicester)
- John Brett (Oxford University)
- Vesey Boyle (Dublin University).
- John Gordon A'Bear (Gloucester)
- Owen Chadwick (Cambridge University)
- Paul Cooke (Oxford University)
- Pop Dunkley Harlequins)
- George Hancock (Birkenhead Park)
- Peter Hobbs (Richmond)
- Peter Hordern (Gloucester)
- Fred Huskisson (Old Merchant Taylors)
- Tom Knowles (Birkenhead Park)
- J. S. Moll (Lloyds Bank)
- Alexander Obolensky (Oxford University)
- Denis Pratten (Blackheath)
- Robin Prescott (Harlequins)
- Wilson Shaw (Glasgow High School)
- John Tallent (Blackheath)
- Harold Uren (Waterloo)
- Jim Unwin (Rosslyn Park)
- Jock Waters (Selkirk)
- Bill Weston (Northampton)

== Match summary ==
Complete list of matches played by the British Isles in Argentina:

Test match

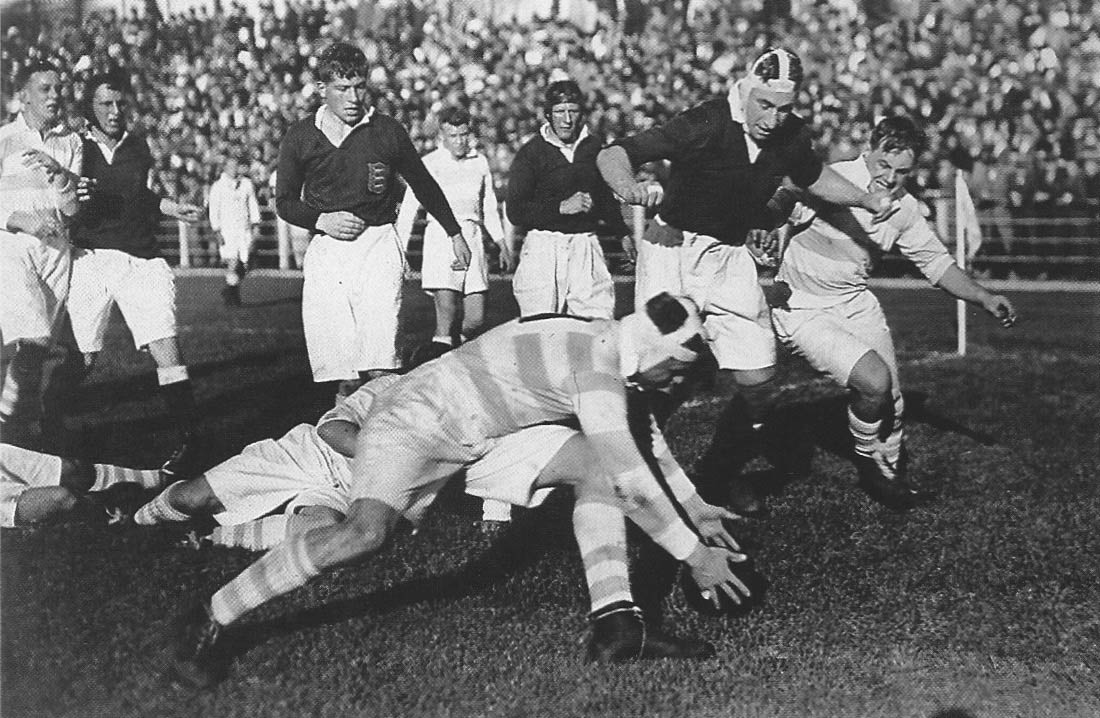
The Lions v. Argentina national team, played on 16 August at GEBA

#	Date	Rival	Score	Venue	City
1	15 Jul	Buenos Aires F.C.	55–0	Gimnasia y Esgrima	Buenos Aires
2	18 Jul	Argentina A	27–0	Gimnasia y Esgrima	Buenos Aires
3	22 Jul	Olivos	27–3	Gimnasia y Esgrima	Buenos Aires
4	26 Jul	Argentina B	28–0	Gimnasia y Esgrima	Buenos Aires
5	29 Jul	Pacific Railway	62–0	Gimnasia y Esgrima	Buenos Aires
6	2 Aug	Litoral Rugby Union	41–0	Plaza Jewell	Rosario
7	5 Aug	Old Georgian	55–6	Gimnasia y Esgrima	Buenos Aires
8	9 Aug	Belgrano A.C.	37–3	Gimnasia y Esgrima	Buenos Aires
9	16 Aug	Argentina	23–0	Gimnasia y Esgrima	Buenos Aires
10	23 Aug	CASI–Hindú–CUBA Combined	44–0	Gimnasia y Esgrima	Buenos Aires

Balance
Pl	W	D	L	Ps	Pc
10	10	0	0	399	12

== Match details ==
=== Argentina Test ===
16 August 1936

Argentina	0–23	(United Kingdom) British Isles
	Report	Try: Boyle (2); Tallent; Unwin; Con: Brett (2); Pen: Brett; Drop: Shaw

Gimnasia y Esgrima, Buenos Aires
Attendance: ?
Referee: Hugh Hughes (South Africa)

Argentina	British Isles

Argentina			British Isles
Héctor Alfonso	FB	15	FB	Harold Uren
Riebeck Elliot	W	14	W	Jim Unwin
Herbert Talbot	C	13	C	John Tallent
Horacio Pascualli	C	12	C	Wilson Shaw
Eduardo Schiavio	W	11	W	Vesey Boyle
Percy Talbot	FH	10	FH	Tom Knowles
Noel Cooper	SH	9	SH	Bernard Gadney (c)
Gilbert Logan	N8	8	N8	Peter Hobbs
José Frigoli	F	7	F	Peter Hordern
Jorge Cilley	F	6	F	Bill Weston
Tomás Salzman	L	5	L	Fred Huskisson
Jumbo Francombe (c)	L	4	L	Charles Beamish
Ray Cameron	P	3	P	John Brett
Virgilio Inchausti	H	2	H	Owen Chadwick
Bernardo Mitchelstein	P	1	P	Robin Prescott
