= Uren =

Uren may refer to:

== Places ==
- Uren, Saskatchewan, a community in Saskatchewan, Canada
- Uren Urban Settlement, a municipal formation which the town of district significance of Uren in Urensky District of Nizhny Novgorod Oblast, Russia is incorporated as
- Uren, Russia, a town in Urensky District of Nizhny Novgorod Oblast, Russia
- Urén, Michoacán, a locality in Michoacán, Mexico
- Uren River, a river in Costa Rica

== People ==
- Clarrie Uren (1900–?), Australian football player
- Dick Uren (1926–2010), English rugby player
- Harold Uren (footballer) (1885–?), English football player
- Jeff Uren (1925–2007), British racing driver
- Malcolm Uren (1900–1973), Australian journalist
- Michael Uren (born 1923), British businessman and philanthropist
- Tom Uren (1921-2015), Australian politician

== See also ==
- Urine
