= Ernest Harding (rugby union) =

England international rugby union player

- Full name: Ernest Harold Harding
- Born: 22 May 1899 Mile End, England
- Died: 25 December 1980 (aged 81) Liskeard, Cornwall, England

Rugby union career
- Position: Back-row
International career
Years	Team	Apps	(Points)
1931	England	1	(0)

Ernest Harold Harding (22 May 1899 – 25 December 1980) was an English international rugby union player.

A back-row forward, Harding played his rugby for Devonport Services and the Royal Navy.

Harding had to wait until he was 31 years-of-age to gain an England cap, due to his Navy duties often making him unavailable for selection. He made his only international appearance in a 1931 Five Nations match against Ireland at Twickenham, as wing-forward in an all new back row, along with Pop Dunkley and Peter Hordern.

== See also ==
- List of England national rugby union players
