= Harold Uren =

Harold Uren may refer to:

- Harold Uren (footballer)
- Harold Uren (rugby union)
