= Glegg =

Glegg is a surname. Notable people with the surname include:

== Historical ==
- Alex Glegg (born 1971), Canadian cricketer
- William Glegg, the founder of the Calday Grange Grammar School

== Fictional characters ==
- Jane Glegg, in The Mill on the Floss by George Eliot
- J. Glegg, in Kabumpo in Oz by Ruth Plumly Thompson

== See also ==
- Gregg (surname)
