= Peter Hobbs (rugby union) =

- Full name: Peter Graham Hobbs
- Born: 19 March 1911
- Died: 27 May 1942 (aged 31) near Bir Hakeim, Libya
- School: Wellington College
- Notable relative(s): Reginald F.A. Hobbs (father); Reginald G.S. Hobbs (brother)

Rugby union career
- Position: No. 8
International career
Years	Team	Apps	(Points)
1936	British Lions		

Peter Graham Hobbs (19 March 1911 – 27 May 1942) was an English international rugby union player.

Hobbs was the middle-born son of Army officer Reginald Hobbs. The eldest of his two brothers, Reginald Jr, also played rugby and was capped for England. He attended Wellington College, where he was a member of the first XV.

An Army major, Hobbs played his rugby in inter-services matches and for Richmond. He was unable to replicate his brother in playing for England, but earned Kent representative honours, and in 1936 toured Argentina as a member of British Lions, with the international against the Pumas amongst his five tour appearances in the back of the scrum.

Hobbs served as a Brigade Major in the Royal Horse Artillery, 7th Armoured Division, and was killed in action near Bir Hakeim, Libya, in 1942. His younger brother, William, died the following year while serving in Tunisia.

== See also ==
- List of British & Irish Lions players
