= Ernest Harding =

Ernest Harding may refer to:

- Ted Harding, Australian politician and rugby league player
- Ernest Harding (rugby union), English international rugby union player
