= Grange, Merseyside =

Suburb of West Kirby, Wirral, England

Coordinates: 53.370°N 3.168°W

Grange
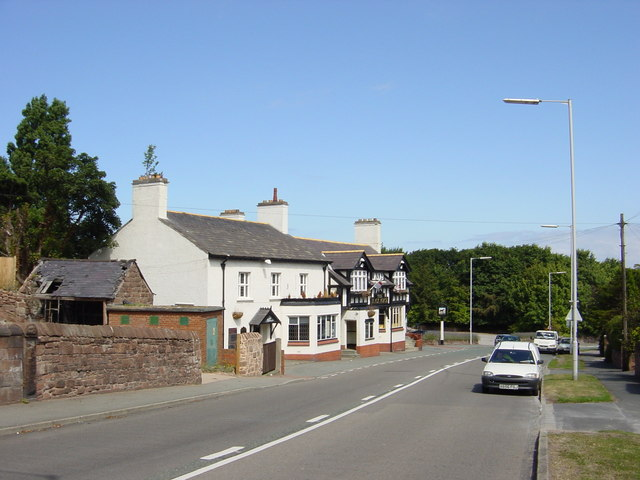
- The Black Horse Inn, Black Horse Hill, in 2006

- Location within Merseyside
- OS grid reference: SJ227867
  - London: 182 mi (293 km) SE
- Metropolitan borough: Wirral
- Metropolitan county: Merseyside
- Region: North West
- Country: England
- Sovereign state: United Kingdom
- Post town: WIRRAL
- Postcode district: CH48
- Dialling code: 0151
- ISO 3166 code: GB-WRL
- Police: Merseyside
- Fire: Merseyside
- Ambulance: North West
- UK Parliament: Wirral West

Grange (historically known as Caldy Grange, which gives its name to the local grammar school) is a suburb of West Kirby, on the Wirral Peninsula, in the Metropolitan Borough of Wirral, Merseyside, England. The suburb is contiguous with Newton to the north east. Historically part of the county of Cheshire, it is within the local government ward of West Kirby and Thurstaston and the parliamentary constituency of Wirral West.

== History ==
According to the Domesday Book of 1086, Grange (also called Great Caldy, or Caldy Grange) was one of the estates owned by Hugh Delamere, consisting of a single household. The land later passed into the hands of Basingwerk Abbey, until the dissolution of the Monasteries. In the seventeenth century it became the property of William Glegg who also founded Calday Grange Grammar School, and it remained the property of the Gleggs until 1785, when it was bought by John Leigh, a Liverpool solicitor and property speculator, who refounded the grammar school. He passed it on to his son John Shaw Leigh who later went on to buy Luton Hoo. By the twentieth century the area was in the hands of the trustees of Madame de Falbe, his son John Gerard Leigh's widow, who had remarried to Christian de Falbe, the Danish ambassador.

Grange was a township in West Kirby parish of the Wirral Hundred, which became a civil parish in 1866 and included the hamlets of Caldy Grange and Newton Carr. The civil parish was part of Wirral Rural District, then from 1933 Hoylake Urban District, within the county of Cheshire. On 1 April 1974 the parish was abolished and the area became unparished, in Merseyside. The population was recorded at 10 in 1801, 105 in 1851, 299 in 1901 and rising to 7,657 by 1951.

== Geography ==
Grange is in the north-western part of the Wirral Peninsula, approximately 2.5 km (1.6 mi) south-east of the Irish Sea at Hoylake, less than 2 km (1.2 mi) east of the Dee Estuary at West Kirby and 10 km (6.2 mi) west-south-west of the River Mersey at Seacombe. Grange is situated on the eastern side of the ridge which includes Grange Hill, with the area at an elevation of between 13–54 m (43–177 ft) above sea level.

== Education ==
In 1636 local landowner William Glegg founded Calday Grange Grammar School on the present site on Grammar School Lane, off Column Road. It was established as a free grammar school and is Wirral's oldest surviving grammar school. Glegg's vision was that the school should have ‘continuance and endure for evermore'. Over the years, his little 12 pupil school has been enlarged into an establishment of nearly 1,400 students – which includes over 400 male and female students in the Sixth Form.

The locality is also served by Hilbre High School and West Kirby Grammar School at secondary education level.

== Sport ==
=== Shooting ===
Grange Rifle and Pistol Club is a private members club which was established in 1942. and offers many types of shooting including air rifle/pistol, black powder pistol, gallery rifle, smallbore rifle, long barreled revolver, fullbore rifle and archery.

=== Swimming ===
Near the grammar school on Gourley's Lane is Calday Grange Swimming Pool which is home to Calday Grange Amateur Swimming Club, West Kirby Amateur Swimming Club, Hoylake Amateur Swimming Club, Woodchurch Swimming Club and the Peninsula Canoe Club.

== Transport ==
=== Road ===
The B5139 passes around and through Grange to the north. The B5139 has junctions with the B5192 Saughall Massie Road and the A540 Column Road, the latter of which runs along the western side of Grange.

=== Rail ===
West Kirby railway station is the nearest to Grange, less than 1 km (0.62 mi) to the west. This station is on the Wirral line of the Merseyrail network, with frequent services to Liverpool.

== See also ==
- Listed buildings in Hoylake

== Bibliography ==
- Mortimer, William Williams (1847). The History of the Hundred of Wirral. London: Whittaker & Co. pp271-273.
