= Peter Hordern =

Peter Hordern may refer to:

- Peter Hordern (politician) (1929–2024), British Conservative Party politician
- Peter Hordern (rugby union) (1907–1988), England international rugby union player
