= Robin Prescott =

British Lions & England international rugby union player

- Full name: Robert Edward Prescott
- Born: 5 April 1913 Paddington, England
- Died: 18 May 1975 (aged 62) Dartmouth, England
- University: University of Oxford
- Notable relative: Curly Hammond (uncle)
- Occupation: Solicitor

Rugby union career
- Position: Prop
International career
Years	Team	Apps	(Points)
1936	British Lions		
1937–39	England	6	(3)

Robert Edward Prescott (5 April 1913 – 18 May 1975) was an English international rugby union player.

Prescott was born in Paddington, London in 1913. His father Ernest was a solicitor who had a period as president of the Rugby Football Union during the 1920s and his mother was the sister of ex-England forward Curly Hammond.

An Oxford blue, Prescott was a wing-forward in the 1932 Varsity Match, then developed into a prop during his time with Harlquins, as the club had a surplus of wing-forwards. He also competed for Marlborough, which he captained. In 1936, Prescott toured Argentina with the British Lions. He featured as a prop for England from 1937 to 1939, earning six caps.

Prescott, a Dartmouth solicitor, also followed his father into rugby administration. He served as an England selector for 10 years and in 1962 succeeded Doug Prentice as Rugby Football Union secretary.

== See also ==
- List of England national rugby union players
- List of British & Irish Lions players
