= Tom Knowles =

Tom Knowles may refer to:

- Tom Knowles (footballer) (born 1998), English association footballer
- Tom Knowles (rugby union) (1908–1985), English rugby union player
