= Alexander Palmer =

Alexander Palmer may refer to:

- A. Mitchell Palmer (1872–1936), Attorney General of the United States
- Alexander Palmer (Australian politician) (1825–1901), banker and member of the Victorian Legislative Assembly (Australia)
- Alex Palmer, English footballer
- Alex Palmer (rugby union), New Zealand-born surgeon and England international rugby union player

== See also ==
- Alexander Palmer MacEwen (1846–1919), British businessman in China, member of the Legislative Council of Hong Kong
