= Pop Dunkley =

British Lions & England international rugby union player

- Full name: Philip Edward Dunkley
- Born: 9 August 1904 Daventry, England
- Died: 17 June 1985 (aged 80) Doncaster, England
- Occupation: Bank manager

Rugby union career
- Position: No. 8
International career
Years	Team	Apps	(Points)
1931–36	England	6	(0)
1936	British Lions		

Philip Edward Dunkley (9 August 1904 – 17 June 1985) was an English international rugby union player.

Born in Charwelton, outside Daventry, Northamptonshire, Dunkley moved to the town of Rugby following his father's death and was educated at Lawrence Sheriff School, before ending up at Royal Orphanage of Wolverhampton.

Dunkley, a number eight, competed for Old Laurentians, Leicester and Harlequins. He also made several appearances with the Barbarians and was captain of Warwickshire. Capped six times for England, Dunkley featured in two of England's 1931 Five Nations matches, was notably part of their first ever win over the All Blacks at Twickenham in 1936, then played all three 1936 Home Nations matches. He was a member of the 1936 British Lions tour to Argentina.

== See also ==
- List of England national rugby union players
- List of British & Irish Lions players
