= Guy Gregson =

British Army general

Major-General Guy Gregson CB CBE DSO* MC
- Born: 8 April 1906; Cape Town, South Africa
- Died: 10 December 1988 (aged 82); Sudbury, Suffolk, England
- Military career
- Allegiance: United Kingdom
- Branch: British Army
- Service years: 1925–1968
- Rank: Major-General
- Service number: 34436
- Unit: Royal Artillery
- Commands: 1st Infantry Division
- Conflicts: Second World War; Korean War
- Awards: Companion of the Order of the Bath; Commander of the Order of the British Empire; Distinguished Service Order & Bar; Military Cross; Mentioned in Despatches (2)

Major-General Guy Patrick Gregson, CB, CBE, DSO & Bar, MC (8 April 1906 – 10 December 1988) was a British Army officer who served General Officer Commanding of the 1st Infantry Division from 1956 to 1959.

== Military career ==
Educated at Gresham's School and the Royal Military Academy, Woolwich, Gregson was commissioned into the Royal Artillery in 1925 and saw active service in the Second World War in the rank of lieutenant colonel. He was mentioned in despatches twice and received the Military Cross, the Distinguished Service Order and Bar and the Croix de Guerre. Promoted to brigadier in 1950, he served in the Korean War and was appointed a Commander of the Order of the British Empire in 1953. He was made General Officer Commanding 1st Infantry Division in 1956 and Regional Director of Civil Defence for the UK's Eastern Region in 1960 before retiring in 1968.

In 1945, Gregson married Oriel Leonie Lucas-Scudamore in Sherman, Connecticut. They divorced and he remarried Iris Slade-Powell.

Military offices
Preceded by Rodney Moore	GOC 1st Infantry Division; 1956–1959	Succeeded by Reginald Hobbs
