= Doug Baker (rugby union) =

English rugby union player (1929–2022)

- Born: Douglas George Santley Baker; 29 November 1929 Las Palmas, Canary Islands, Spain
- Died: 21 December 2022 (aged 93) Sydney, New South Wales, Australia
- School: Merchant Taylors' School

Rugby union career
- Position(s): Fly-half, full-back
Amateur team(s)
Years	Team	Apps	(Points)
1949–1955	Old Merchant Taylors		
1951–1952	Oxford University		
International career
Years	Team	Apps	(Points)
1955	England	4	(0)
1955	British & Irish Lions	2	(3)

Douglas George Santley Baker (29 November 1929 – 21 December 2022) was an English rugby union player, most notable for taking part in the 1955 British Lions tour to South Africa.

== Biography ==
Baker was born in Las Palmas in the Canary Islands, Spain. He was educated at Merchant Taylors' School and Oxford University, gaining Blues in 1951 and 1952. He also played for his school's old boys club Old Merchant Taylors' FC.

In 1953/54, he played against New Zealand for both London Counties and South-Eastern Counties. He was invited to play for the Barbarian F.C. and played for them eight times between 1953 and 1957, scoring a total of 20 points for the side.

His test debut for England was against Wales at Cardiff, 22 January 1955. He was capped four times for England as a fly-half in 1955. He also took part in the 1955 British Lions tour to South Africa, playing in two tests as a full-back. His first test was against South Africa at Pretoria on 3 September 1955 where he scored a penalty earning 3 points for the Lions in their victory. His second test was against South Africa at Port Elizabeth, 24 September 1955. He was also part of the team who played the East Africa rugby union team as the Lions returned home.

Baker later emigrated to Australia, where he was a schoolteacher at Scotch College, Adelaide. On 21 December 2022, he died at the age of 93.
