= Ronald Urquhart =

British Army general (1906–1968)

Major-General Ronald Urquhart CB DSO
- Born: 26 March 1906
- Died: 19 April 1968 (aged 62)
- Military career
- Allegiance: United Kingdom
- Branch: British Army
- Service years: 1925–1960
- Rank: Major-General
- Service number: 34932
- Unit: Royal Engineers
- Commands: 35th Infantry Brigade; Royal Military Academy Sandhurst
- Conflicts: Second World War
- Awards: Companion of the Order of the Bath; Distinguished Service Order

Major-General Ronald Walton Urquhart CB DSO (26 March 1906 – 19 April 1968) was a British Army officer who became Commandant of the Royal Military Academy Sandhurst.

== Early life ==
Urquhart was the son of W. L. A. W. Urquhart, Esq, of Montevideo, Uruguay. He was educated at Bedford School and at Pembroke College, Cambridge. He then attended the Royal Military Academy, Woolwich, earning the rank of Senior Under Officer. He was also awarded the Sword of Honour. He finished his young officer coursework at Chatham and at Pembroke College.

== Military career ==
He was commissioned into the Royal Engineers in 1925. In the Second World War he served in Norway and North West Europe, being awarded the DSO for his services in Normandy. After the War he became Director of Combined Operations and then, from 1953, Commander of 35th Infantry Brigade.

He went on to be Chief of Staff at Western Command in 1956 and Commandant of the Royal Military Academy Sandhurst between 1957 and 1960.

== Personal life ==
He married Jean Moir in 1945 and had children David and Jane. He died on 19 April 1968.

Military offices
Preceded by Reginald Hobbs	Commandant of the Royal Military Academy Sandhurst; 1957−1960	Succeeded by George Gordon-Lennox
