= William Pratten =

England international rugby union player

- Full name: William Edgar Pratten
- Born: 29 May 1907 Lewisham, England
- Died: 25 August 1969 (aged 62) Canterbury, England
- Notable relative: Denis Pratten (brother)

Rugby union career
- Position: Second row
International career
| Years | Team | Apps | (Points) |
| 1927 | England | 2 | (0) |

William Edgar Pratten (29 May 1907 – 25 August 1969) was an English international rugby union player.

Born in Lewisham, Pratten played his club rugby for Blackheath and was a front row forward, who was fast in open play. He represented Kent and was capped twice for England in the 1927 Five Nations.

Pratten was the director of an engineering company and served as governor of Sir Roger Manwood's School.

During World War II, Pratten was a gunner with the Territorial Army in the Middle East.

== See also ==
- List of England national rugby union players
