= George Hancock (rugby union) =

English rugby union player (1912–1993)

- Full name: George Edward Hancock
- Born: 21 March 1912 Cheshire, England
- Died: 2 April 1993 (aged 81) Birkenhead, England
- School: Rock Ferry High School
- Occupation: Solicitor

Rugby union career
- Position: Centre / Wing
International career
Years	Team	Apps	(Points)
1936	British Lions		
1939	England	3	(0)

George Edward Hancock (21 March 1912 – 2 April 1993) was an English international rugby union player.

Hancock was born in the Wirral and educated at Rock Ferry High School.

A three-quarter, Hancock was a Birkenhead Park player and Cheshire representative. His England caps were preceded by a tour to Argentina with the British Lions in 1936. He was an England reserve on multiple occasions in 1938, before getting his opportunity in the 1939 Home Nations, featuring as a centre in all three fixtures.

Hancock worked as a solicitor at Halsall and Co in Birkenhead.

== See also ==
- List of England national rugby union players
- List of British & Irish Lions players
