= Cyril O'Callaghan =

Irish rugby union player

Cyril O'Callaghan OBE MC
- Full name: Cyril Tait O'Callaghan
- Born: 9 September 1889 Carlow, Ireland
- Died: 6 April 1984 (aged 94) Bury St Edmunds, England

Rugby union career
- Position: Wing
International career
Years	Team	Apps	(Points)
1910–12	Ireland	7	(6)

Cyril Tait O'Callaghan (9 September 1889 — 6 April 1984) was an Irish international rugby union player.

O'Callaghan was born in Carlow and attended Framlingham College from 1897 to 1899, followed by Merchant Taylors' School, Northwood (Charterhouse Square), where he played 1st XI cricket and 1st XV rugby.

A wing three-quarter, O'Callaghan played for English club Old Merchant Taylors. He gained seven Ireland caps, debuting in 1910, and scored two tries, both during the 1911 Five Nations.

O'Callaghan served as an officer with the 1st The Royal Dragoons, into which he was commissioned as a second lieutenant in November 1915, and was awarded the Military Cross in January 1919.

During the 1920s, O'Callaghan was an aide-de-camp to the High Commissioner of Egypt George Lloyd, 1st Baron Lloyd. He was promoted to lieutenant colonel in the Reserve of Officers of the Territorial Army's North Somerset Yeomanry.

O'Callaghan married an American from Boston after retiring from active service.

== See also ==
- List of Ireland national rugby union players
