= Henry Fraser (rugby union) =

Henry John Fraser
- Born: 8 November 1887 Perth, Perthshire, Scotland
- Died: 18 July 1976 (aged 88)
- School: Trinity College, Glenalmond
- Occupation: Businessman

Rugby union career
International career
Years	Team	Apps	(Points)
1910	British & Irish Lions		

Henry John "Harry" Fraser (8 November 1887 – 18 July 1976) was a Scottish sportsman and businessman who was selected for the 1910 Combined British tour of Argentina, now recognised as a British & Irish Lions tour.

== Early life and education ==
Fraser was born in Perth, Scotland, the son of John McLaren Fraser and Alice K. Fraser. In the 1901 census he was recorded as a 13-year-old scholar residing at Invermay Mansion House, Forteviot, Perthshire. He was educated at Trinity College, Glenalmond.

Fraser came from a distinguished sporting family. His brothers included William Lovat Fraser, a Scottish cricketer and rugby international who also toured Argentina with the 1910 Combined British side; Alan Fraser, who represented Scotland at first-class cricket; and Rowland Fraser, a Scotland international rugby union player who was killed in action during the First World War.

== Cricket career ==
Fraser began playing competitive cricket while at Glenalmond, representing the school against Perthshire in 1904. In 1907 he played for W. E. Anderson's XI against Auchterarder alongside his brothers Alan and Rowland.

By 1909 he had developed a reputation as a powerful batsman. The Perthshire Advertiser described him as a “great hitter” in the Stirling district, noting that he regularly “broke the heart of the best bowlers,” and referred to him as “Harry Fraser.”

He later played county cricket for:

- Perthshire
- Fifeshire
- Dunfermline

== Rugby career ==
Fraser was selected for the 1910 Combined British tour of Argentina, a side now recognised as part of the official history of the British & Irish Lions.

On the tour he made a number of appearances for the Combined British side and scored a try in the match against Argentina on 12 June 1910. His participation places him among the early Scottish players selected for what later became recognised as Lions tours.

At the time Fraser was engaged in commercial business in the Argentine Republic, and his return to Scotland later that year was reported in the Scottish press.

== Personal life ==
On 27 July 1911 Fraser married Annie Campbell, daughter of P. W. Campbell of Messrs P. & P. Campbell, dye workers, and granddaughter of Peter Campbell of Lignwood, Scone. Following their marriage, the couple settled in Dunfermline.

They had one son, John Lewis Fraser (1913 – 29 August 1991), born in Dunfermline, who later became managing director of Frew and Company Ltd., Automotive Engineers, Perth.

== Death ==
Fraser died on 18 July 1976.
