= John Tallent =

England international rugby union player & British Army officer

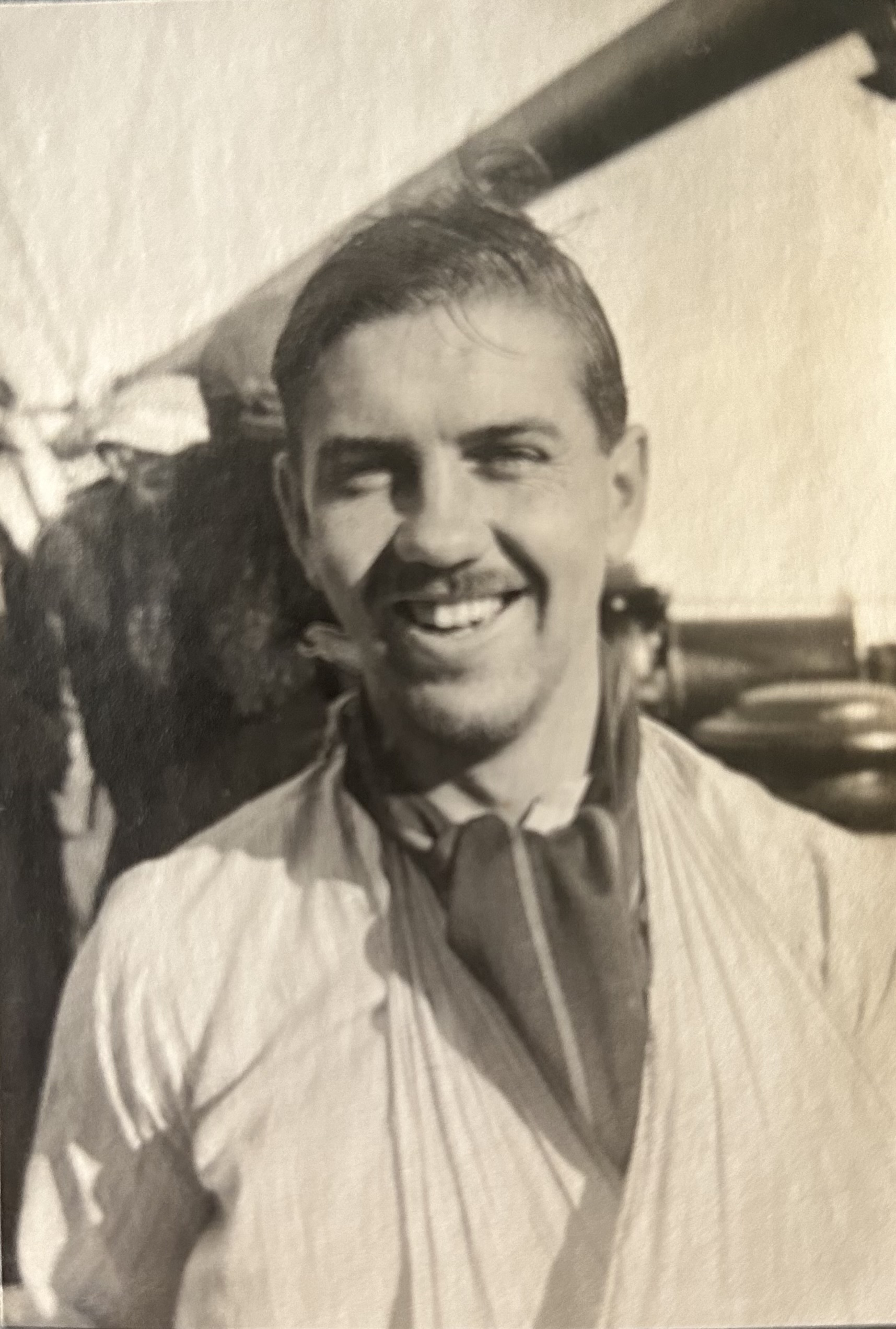
- John Tallent in his rugby playing days.
- Full name: John Arthur Tallent
- Born: 8 March 1911 Chislehurst, Kent, England
- Died: 14 April 2004 (aged 93) Hampshire, England
- School: Sherborne School
- University: Cambridge University
- Occupation(s): Teacher & Stockbroker

Rugby union career
- Position: Centre
Senior career
Years	Team	Apps	(Points)
1929-32	Cambridge University	51	(108)
1933	Cambridge Vandals	8	(9)
1930-38	Blackheath	106	(72)
1931-32	Barbarians	2	(0)
1933-37	East Midlands	21	(18)
1936	British Lions - Non Test	9	(21)
1930-41	Charity, Trial & Other Games	31	(15)
International career
Years	Team	Apps	(Points)
1931–35	England	5	(9)
1936	British Lions - Test Match	1	(3)

Lieutenant-Colonel John Arthur Tallent CBE OBE TD (8 March 1911 – 14 April 2004) was an international rugby union player, President of The Rugby Football Union, distinguished army officer, teacher and business man.

Born at Walton Lodge, Chislehurst, Kent, Tallent was educated at St Hugh's School in Chislehurst, Sherborne School and the University of Cambridge.

== Rugby career ==
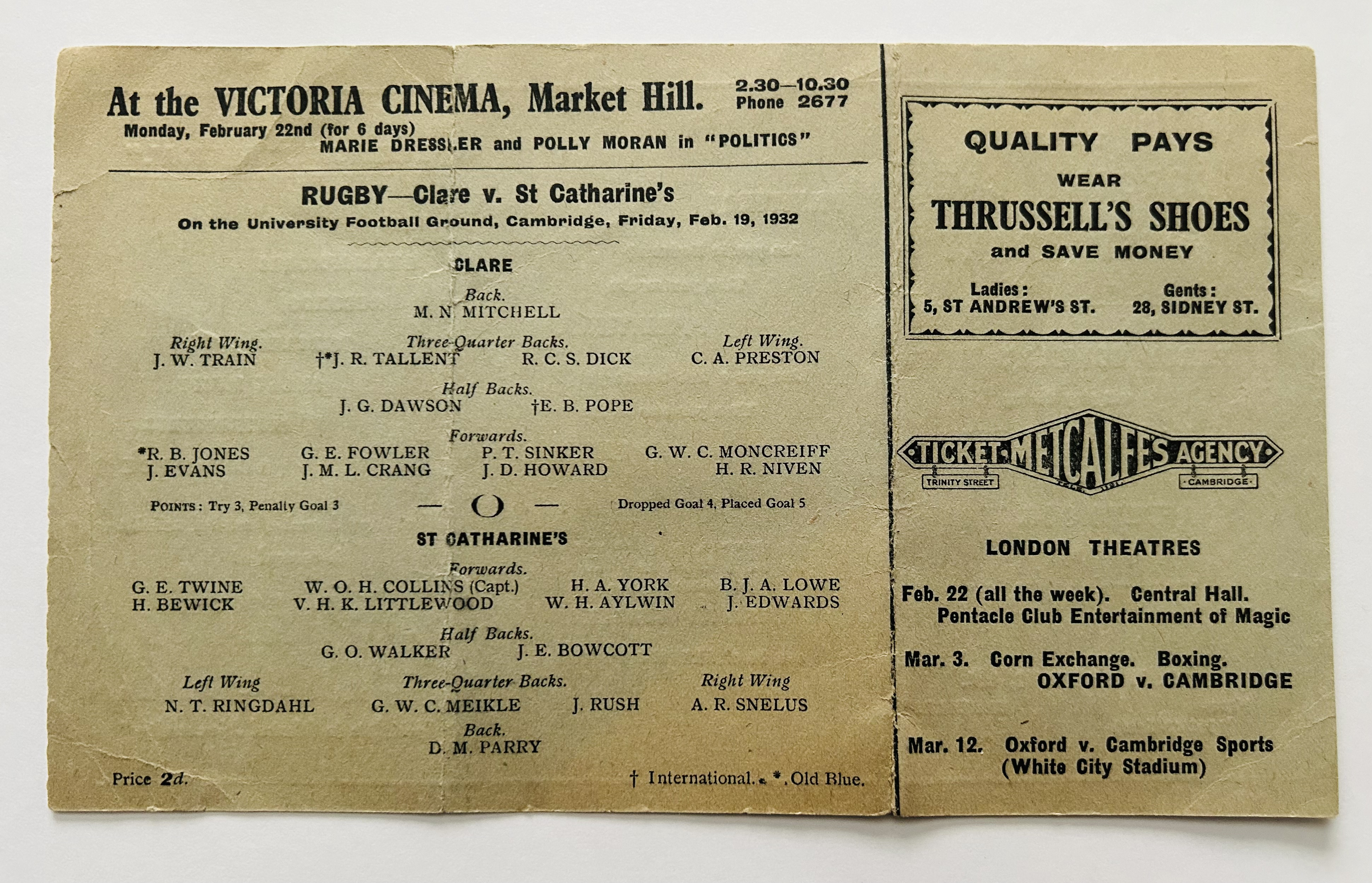
Clare v St Catherine's College Rugby Programme

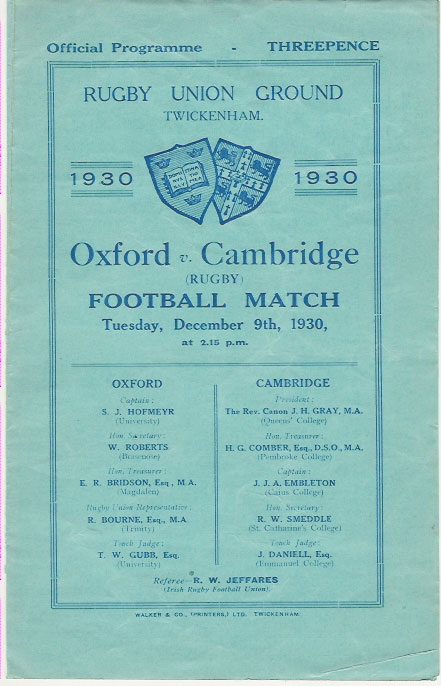
Oxford v Cambridge 1930 Varsity Rugby Programme

After a successful introduction to the game at Sherborne, where he was the First XV captain, winning all 6 games in 1928, he went up to Clare College, Cambridge in 1929. He represented the University, mainly as a fast running center, on fifty-one occasions, scoring thirty-six tries. He won three blues, losing twice but gaining a creditable 3–3 tie in 1930.

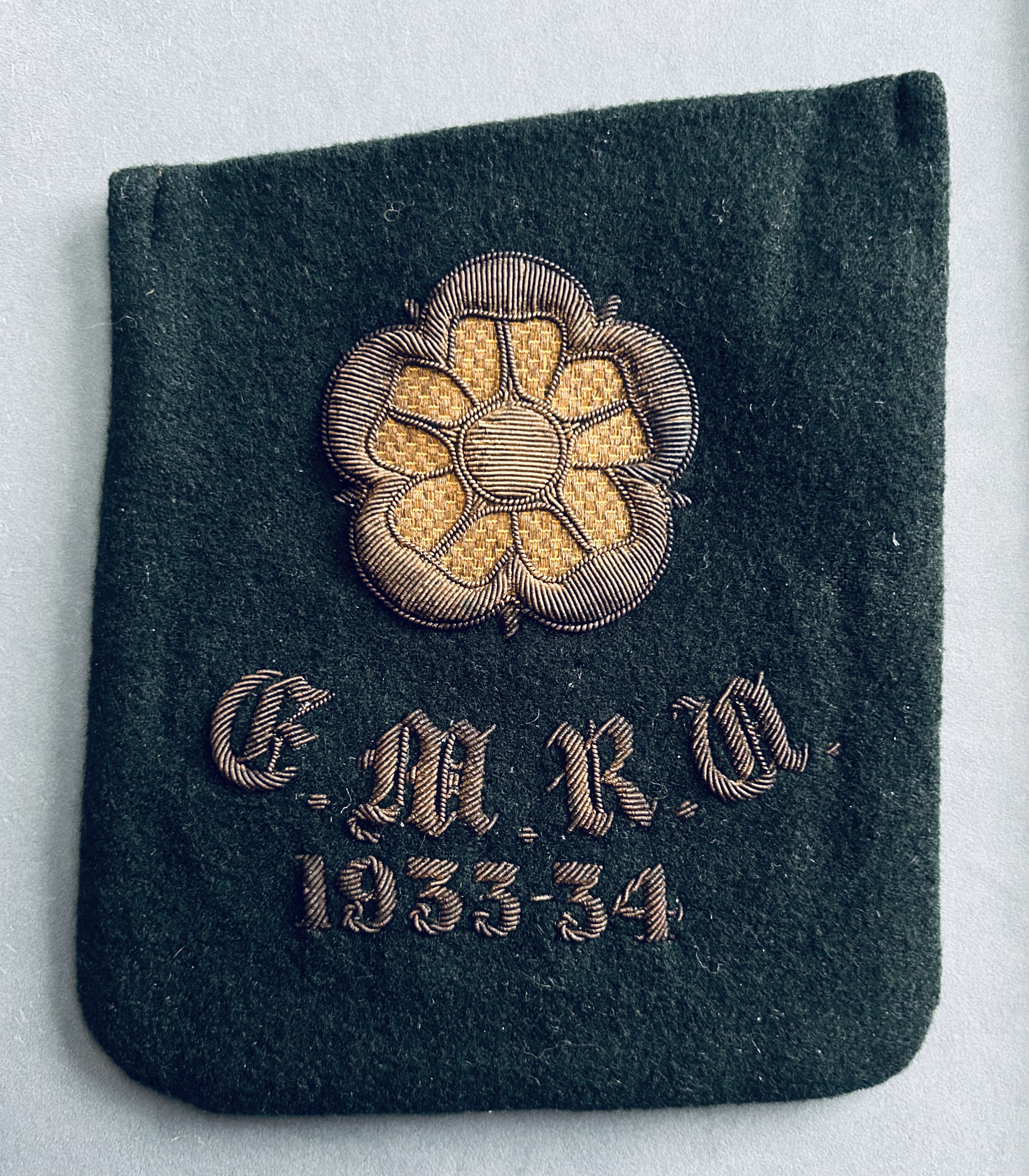
John Tallent's East Midlands Rugby Union Blazer Badge

He subsequently joined Blackheath, known at the time as the most notable club in London playing one hundred and six games scoring twenty-two tries. He was a Kent, London and most notably East Midlands representative player. He played twenty-one times for the East Midlands, winning the County Championship in 1934, scoring the second try in the final and were also runners up in 1937.

He gained five England caps, making his debut on 21 March 1931 with two tries against Scotland at Murrayfield in the eventual 28–19 defeat. He played three more times in the next nine months, loses to France, South Africa and Wales respectively. He was recalled to the team on 9 February 1935 and was influential as standoff half in a 14–3 win over Ireland at Twickenham, his final game for his country.

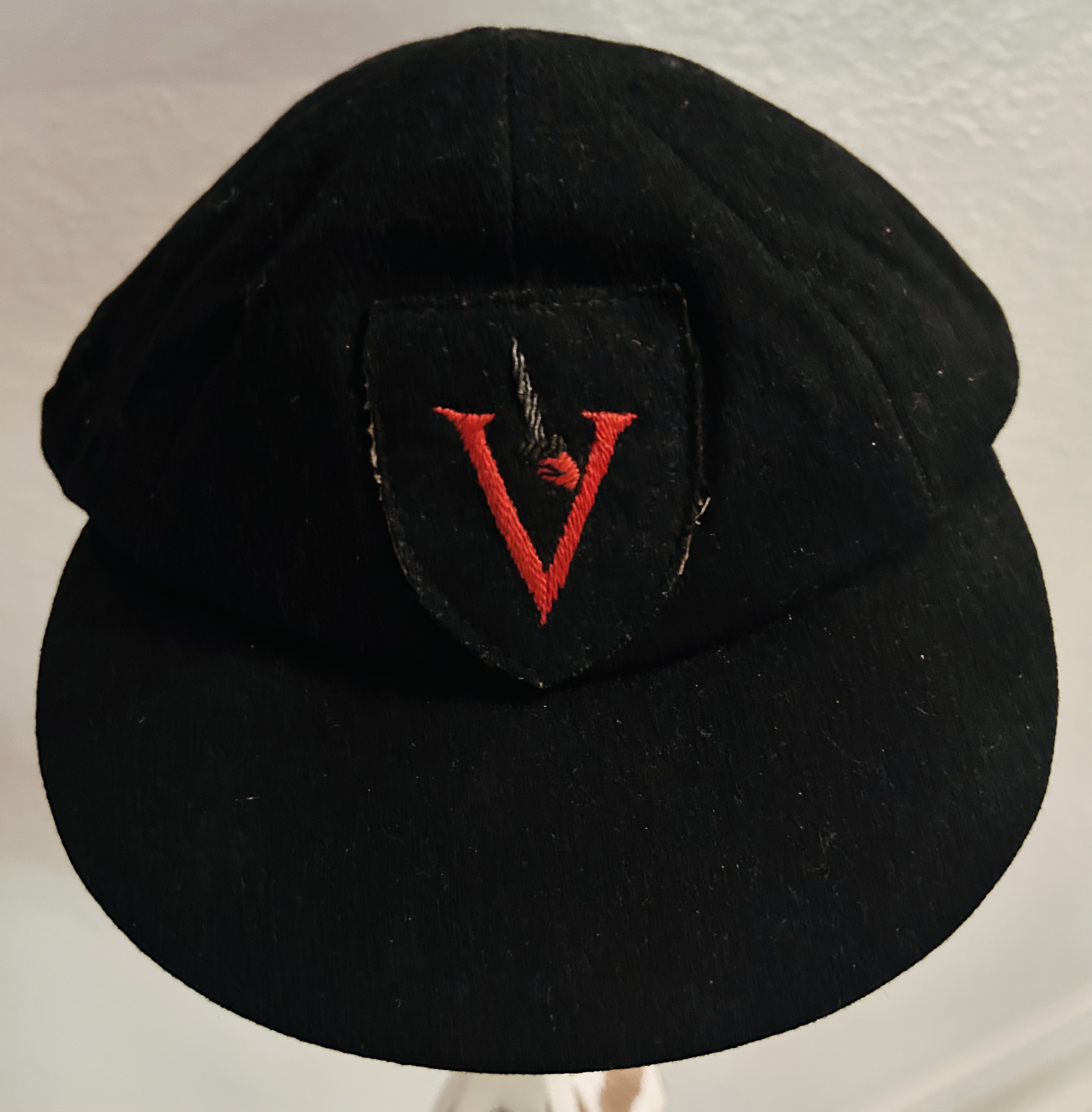
John Tallent's Cambridge Vandals 1933 Tour Cap

In August and September 1933, Tallent was part of the first British rugby team to tour of North America with the Cambridge Vandals club. A strong Vandals team, including several internationals, won eight and drew one of their rugby games, also playing a number of cricket matches. Tallent played in all but the last game due to injury, scoring three tries.

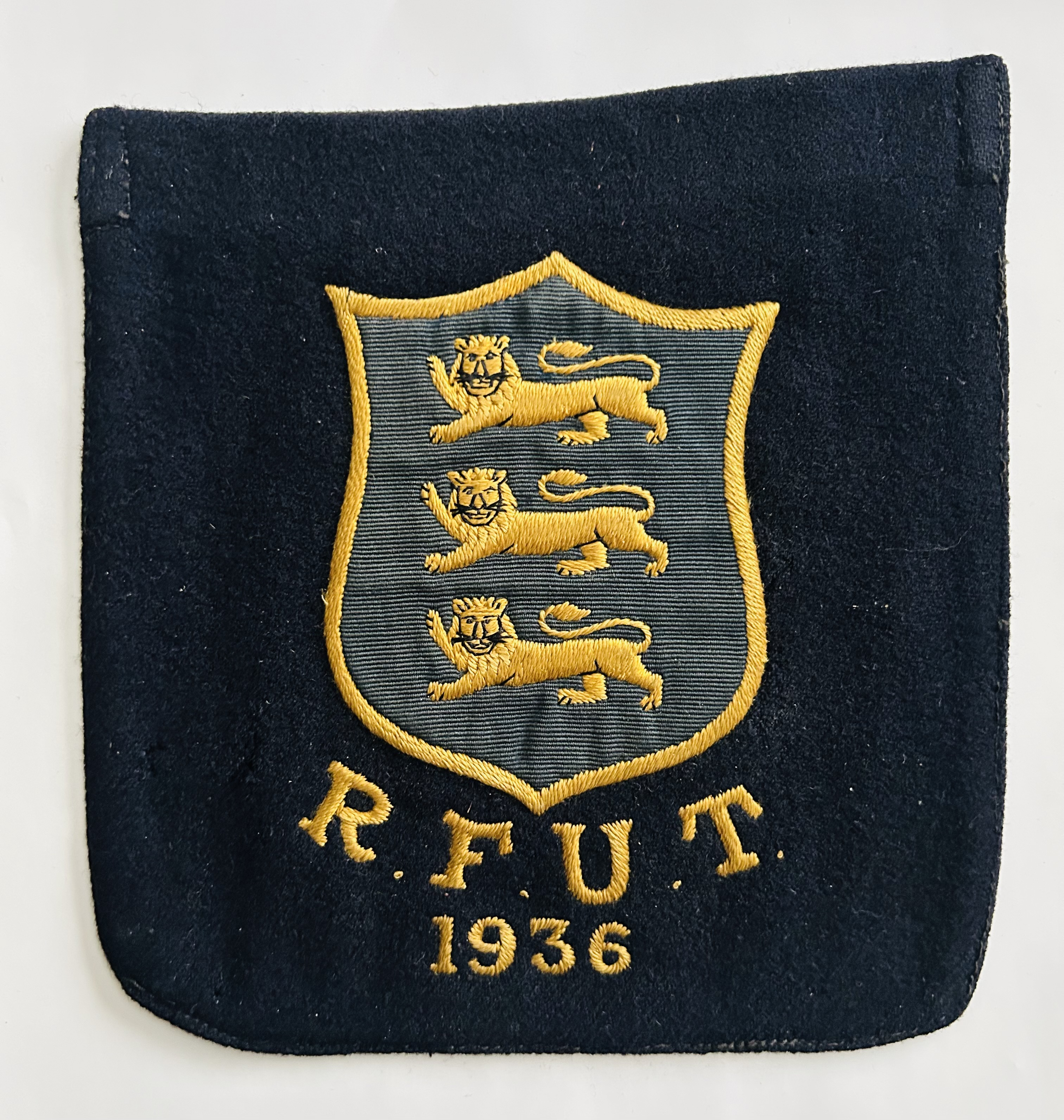
John Tallent's 1936 Rugby Football Union Touring Blazer Badge

In July and August 1936, Tallent toured Argentina with the British Lions. A very strong team that included several international players won all ten games, conceding only 12 points in total. This included a 23–0 win over Argentina on 16 August 1936 at Gimnasia y Esgrima in Buenos Aires. Tallent played in all games scoring eight tries.

Tallent was a prolific player of charity and memorial games, playing in more than twenty recorded fixtures. Most notably he played in seven straight Mobbs Memorial matches at Franklin Gardens from 1931 to 1937. In the first two he represented the Barbarians and the final five East Midlands.

On 25 September 1937 he suffered a serious leg injury whilst playing for Blackheath against Plymouth Albion at Rectory Field and this effectively ended his career at the age of 27. He tried a comeback game for the club but never played for them again after that.

In November 1937 a John Tallent XV played against St. Barts Hospital to raise money for a new stand at their Chislehurst Sports Ground. Additionally in 1940 he was a touch judge when the Army defeated Great Britain 23–15 at the Richmond Athletic Ground.

Tallent played in just three subsequent charity games, his senior career ending on 4 February 1941 when he represented an Anti-Aircraft XV against Wasps at Sudbury. He retired having played two hundred and thirty-four games, scoring eighty-three tries. In later years he would play for the Sherborne Pilgrims, his schools Old Boys’ club for whom he played rugby and cricket; however, no records of these games are currently available.

== Rugby Sevens ==
As the rugby sevens game spread from Scotland to England, Tallent was an enthusiastic supporter and player of the game. He was a winner with Blackheath of the Middlesex Sevens tournament held at Twickenham in 1932 beating Harlequins 18–10. They dominated the tournament conceding only two tries in the five matches, scoring 77 points including 12 tries against just 10. The win was a just reward for Blackheath, having reached four of the previous six finals staged without winning.

== Military Service ==
Tallent saw war service in the Honourable Artillery Company, joining on 4 January 1939. He was second-in-command of its Heavy Anti-Aircraft Regiment, landing in Normandy on D-Day. After initially protecting the landing beaches, the regiment then supported attacks on the Caen Canal, finally defending Antwerp after its liberation in September 1944. He was subsequently promoted and commanded the 118 HAA at Nijmegen in The Netherlands. Already awarded the Territorial Decoration he left the army in February 1945 and was made an Officer of the Order of the British Empire for his war service in 1946.

== Teaching & Stockbroking Career ==
Tallent become a master at Stowe School in 1933, later becoming a governor. In 1936 he left to begin a successful career as a stockbroker, rising to become a director with W N Middleton, later Greig Middleton. After his war service he returned to the London Stock Exchange where he worked until his retirement in 1975. He remained a consultant and continued visiting the London office well into his eighties.

== Rugby Administration ==
A long-time rugby administrator, Tallent served as President of Blackheath between 1955 and 1958, winning the Middlesex Sevens title in his final year. From he 1947 represented the Central Districts on the Rugby Football Union Committee becoming president in 1959–60. He was made a Commander of the Order of the British Empire in the 1961 New Year Honours for services to rugby. He also sat on the International Rugby Board between 1961 and 1967.

Tallent was the RFU's representative on the Four Home Unions Tours Committee between 1961 and 1976, serving as its chairman for the final nine years. He was instrumental in selecting personnel for two iconic Lions tours. In 1971, coached Carwyn James, and led by John Dawes, they defeated New Zealand two tests to one with one match drawn. In 1974 Willie-John McBride’s Lions went unbeaten in South Africa, winning three internationals and drawing the fourth.

Tallent was also involved in a great controversy of its day during New Zealand's 1972 tour to Ireland and Great Britain. Kiwi prop forward Keith Murdoch's career ended controversially after he was sent home from the tour. He scored the All Blacks' only try in their win against Wales in Cardiff, but later the same night was involved in a fracas in which he punched security guard Peter Grant at the Angel Hotel. Reputedly pressure was brought to bear by the home rugby unions and particularly Tallent who it is alleged indicated that the tour may be ended if he was not sent home.

== See also ==
- List of England national rugby union players
- List of British & Irish Lions players
