= Edward Newman Fuller =

British Lions international rugby union player

- Photograph taken in 1912 for the Royal Aero Club
- Born: Edward Newman Fuller; 25 September 1888 Essex, England
- Died: 1 August 1969 (aged 80) Sussex, England
- School: Merchant Taylors' School

Rugby union career
- Position: Three-quarter back – centre
Amateur team(s)
Years	Team	Apps	(Points)
1910-	Old Merchant Taylors		
1909	Cambridge University		
- Kent
International career
Years	Team	Apps	(Points)
1910	Combined British	1	

Edward Newman Fuller (1888–1969) was an English sportsman and aviator. He played rugby union at an international level, touring Argentina with the 1910 Combined British rugby union side, an early incarnation of the British & Irish Lions.

== Early life ==
Edward Newman Fuller was born on 25 September 1888, in Billericay, Essex, the youngest son of George (a member of the stock exchange) and Maria L. Lee. He attended Merchant Taylors' School where he featured in the School first fifteen Rugby squad in 1906–07, but where he was more noted for his prowess as a cricketer playing in the School XI in 1903, 1904, 1905, 1906 (as captain) and 1907 (as captain). He left school in 1907 and became a scholar of Magdalene College, Cambridge.

== Rugby union ==
Fuller played his rugby for his school's old boys club, Old Merchant Taylors' and was captain of the OMTFC in 1910-11 and 1911–12. Although he was never selected to play rugby for England, he was selected to tour with the Combined British on the 1910 tour to Argentina where he played in what Argentina count as their first test match.

== Career and later life ==
In October 1912, Fuller was awarded an Aviator's Certificate (No. 325) by the Royal Aero Club. Before the First World War he joined the Royal Flying Corps (Special Reserve). He served in France and Egypt amongst other theatres. On 25 January 1913 he became a second lieutenant, and became a major during the war.

On 21 March 1917, at Jesmond Parish Church, the now Lieutenant-Colonel Edward Newman Fuller, R.F.C., was married to Dorothy Kate, the eldest daughter of Mr and Mrs James Legg, of Paul's Dean, Salisbury. He died on 1 August 1969 in Hailsham, Sussex, England.

== See also ==
- List of pilots awarded an Aviator's Certificate by the Royal Aero Club in 1912
- List of uncapped British & Irish Lions rugby union players
