= Alun Lewis (rugby union) =

British Lions international rugby union player

- Born: 15 January 1956 (age 70) Abertridwr, Caerphilly, Wales
- Height: 1.74 m (5 ft 9 in)
- Weight: 83 kg (13 st 1 lb)
- University: Cambridge University

Rugby union career
- Position: Scrum-half
International career
Years	Team	Apps	(Points)
1977	British Lions	1	(0)

Alun Lewis (born 15 January 1956) is a former Welsh rugby union player. He joined the 1977 British Lions tour to New Zealand as a replacement. He represented Cambridge University R.U.F.C. in the Varsity Match in 1975 and 1976 and played club rugby for Bedford in 1974–75 before joining London Welsh RFC. However, he never played international rugby for Wales; he is thus the last uncapped player to represent the Lions to date.
