= Fred Huskisson =

British Lions & England international rugby union player

Fred Huskisson MBE MC
- Full name: Thomas Frederick Huskisson
- Born: 1 July 1914 Mortlake, Surrey, England
- Died: 25 April 2004 (aged 89) Stroud, Glos, England
- School: Merchant Taylors' School

Rugby union career
- Position: Lock
International career
Years	Team	Apps	(Points)
1936	British Lions		
1937–39	England	8	(0)

Thomas Frederick Huskisson (1 July 1914 – 25 April 2004) was an English international rugby union player.

Huskisson was born in Surrey and attended Merchant Taylors' School, Northwood, where he played schoolboy rugby initially as a fullback, then transitioned to the second row in his final years. He afterwards played for Old Merchant Taylors and was a member of the 1936 British Lions tour to Argentina. In 1937, Huskisson featured in all three matches for England in their Triple Crown-winning Home Nations campaign. He continued with England until 1939, amassing eight caps.

In World War II, Huskisson was commissioned into the Duke of Wellington's Regiment and had attained the rank of captain by the time he arrived in North Africa in 1943. He received a shrapnel injury to his head from an exploding mortar bomb during fighting in Tunisia in April. After recovering, Huskisson took part in the Italian campaign and on 30 January 1944 the Company he led captured a strategically important position above Campoleone, which they held for six days while under continuous shelling. This earned him a Military Cross and he was then awarded a bar for capturing a position at the village of Pantoni, surrounded by German machine guns and mines, in May 1944.

Huskisson worked in sales and management with a meat company post war, before retiring in 1979.

== See also ==
- List of British & Irish Lions players
- List of England national rugby union players
