= Old Merchant Taylors' FC =

English rugby union team from Northwood, Hertfordshire

(England) Old Merchant Taylors'
- Full name: Old Merchant Taylors' Football Club
- Union: Middlesex RFU
- Nickname: OMT
- Founded: 1882; 144 years ago
- Location: Northwood, Hillingdon, London, England
- Ground(s): War Memorial Sports Ground, Merchant Taylors' School, Northwood
- League: London 3 North West
- 2019–20: 9th

Official website
- www.omtrugby.co.uk

The Old Merchant Taylors' Football Club is an open rugby union club that was founded as a team for the old boys of Merchant Taylors' School, Northwood, who are known as Old Merchant Taylors. It is one of the oldest clubs in London. It used to be prominent on the club circuit. Many eminent players have been members of the club, some of whom gained their international caps whilst at the club.

== History ==
Merchant Taylors' School, Northwood, had been playing football since 1859, though by Association rules until 1861. Thereafter it also adopted Rugby School rules. The first club to be formed by old boys of Merchant Taylors was founded in 1867. However, it was open to membership from outside of the Merchant Taylors' alumni, and the team was named Wasps. In 1882, the seventeen-year-old Leo, a pupil at Merchant Taylors, wrote to the school magazine, The Taylorian, asking for old boys to join a club for old boys. Within a few months the club was formed and in its first season played six games.

The club was regarded as one of the best in London by 1900 and from 1900 to 1902 had its most impressive record, due in main to the attacking prowess of John Raphael, the sporting phenomenon who had won 14 blues at Oxford University.

In World War I the club lost a number of members but continued a first class fixture list. The Second World War also took its toll. By the 1960s the club was struggling to maintain the levels of performance it once displayed and dropped its first class fixture list. The club also became an open rugby club. The next 40 years saw a period of decline, in line with many "old boy" Clubs.

The relocation to the new clubhouse and grounds in 2011 gave a new impetus to the Club, then in its 130th Season. Recruitment expanded considerably, and over the next three seasons the Club gained three successive promotions, reaching London 2NW (level 7) in the 2014/15 season. It also expanded to three regular adult men's sides, with the 2nds (Lambs) and 3rds ("A's") playing in the Herts/Middx Merit Tables. The 2nds also gained promotion and in 2015/16 will play in Division 2.

Youth rugby began in 2010, recruiting most of its players from Merchant Taylors' School who play one-term rugby (September–December). This commences in January of each year and plays U14-U17 friendlies around the counties from which boys generally attend the school (Middlesex, Hertfordshire and Buckinghamshire). In 2015 the U15 and U16 were unbeaten and won a "double" of both winning the Harrow RFC 10's Tournament.

The club pays particular attention to encouraging its student players to return to the club during vacations. One initiative in August 2012 was the first-ever "OMT University Challenge 7's Tournament" where OMTS played for their future, current or past universities. Six universities competed and the final was won by Leeds University, captained by Will Magie (OMT & then captain of the USA U20 team) against a combined Oxbridge squad, captained by Marcus-Alexander Neil, OMT and previously captain of Oxford University Rugby League. OMT also won a hat-trick 2012–2014 of winning the Hertfordshire RFU Returning Students 10s Festival held in December each year under floodlights at Old Albanians RFC.

To further promote recruitment and retention OMT commenced a 7's Squad – the HoneyBadgers – in 2014, who have now become a regular feature on the London and Southeast 7's circuit. In 2015 it won silverware in four out of five competitions it entered, and is now competing at higher "Open" levels.

== Ground ==
The club has played at a number of grounds, but now plays at the War Memorial Sports Ground, Merchant Taylors' School, Northwood It has two dedicated pitches of international standard and is now used regularly by Hertfordshire and Middlesex to stage county matches. In April 2012 OMTFC hosted the first home international for the England U18 Clubs & Schools team, who played Ireland Clubs U18, winning 39–10. A crowd of over 700 watched this match.

== Notable players and former players ==
The school from which the club arose has produced many internationals, most of whom played for OMTFC. In 2012 Will Magie, OMT and a Leeds University player captained the USA U20's, winning the Junior Rugby World Trophy.

In January 2013, Sam Katz, OMT, a student at Loughborough University, represented England Students vs Portugal, scoring 20 points in their 25–20 win vs the national side.

On 15 November 2014, Joe Cokanasiga debuted for the 1st XV on his 17th birthday, becoming the youngest player to represent OMT since RFU minimum age requirements. At the end of the 2014/15 season he had become the highest try scorer in the club.

=== Internationals ===
Source: OMT Centenary programme

Old Merchant Taylors' Internationals
Name	Country	Caps	Span	Notes
J. E. Bentley	England	2	1871–72	The first ever international. Bentley's appearance predates the formation of OMTFC
H. H. Taylor	England	5	1879–82	Taylor's appearance predates the formation of OMTFC
A. S. Taylor	England	4	1883–86	
N. C. Fletcher	England	4	1901–03	
J. E. Raphael	England	9	1902–06	
C. T. O'Callaghan	Ireland	7	1910–12	
J. G. Will	Scotland	7	1912–14	
W. I. Cheesman	England	4	1913	
R. Cove-Smith	England	29	1921–29	(Captain 1927–28)
R. R. F. MacLennan	England	3	1925	
T. F. Huskisson	England	8	1937–39	Also made 7 appearances for England during WWII from 1939 to 1942
D. G. S. Baker	England	4	1955	
W. M. Magie	USA	31	2017-2022	

=== British and Irish Lions ===
Old Merchant Taylors' British & Irish Lions
Name	Tour	Test Caps	Non-test matches played	Notes
Edward Newman Fuller	Argentina 1910	1		Classed as an R.F.U. not officially Lions
Peter Denny Strang	Argentina 1910	1		Classed as an R.F.U. not officially Lions
J. E. Raphael	Argentina 1910	1		Captain; Classed as an R.F.U. not officially Lions
R. Cove-Smith	South Africa 1924	4		Captain
T. F. Huskisson	Argentina 1936			Classed as an R.F.U. not officially Lions
D. G. S. Baker	South Africa 1955	2		

=== Other ===
Merchant Taylors has also produced eight more players who have represented the Barbarians, eight England trialists, one Ireland trialist, eleven Oxford Blues (and three War time representatives), eight Cambridge Blues (and one War time representatives); one Southern Counties representative; numerous London and London Counties representatives and many players who have played at county level representing at least 16 counties.

==== Barbarians ====
- E. H. Gunnery 1892–93
- G. L. Crimp 1896–97
- N. C. Fletcher 189899
- G. T. Hankin 1898–99
- R. P. Dalton 1913–14
- A. G. Johnson 1929–30
- T. F. Huskisson 1936–37
- D. G. S. Baker 1952–53

== See also ==
- Merchant Taylors' School, Northwood
- Category:People educated at Merchant Taylors' School, Northwood
