= Reginald Hobbs =

British Army general (1908–1977)

Major-General Reginald Hobbs CB DSO OBE
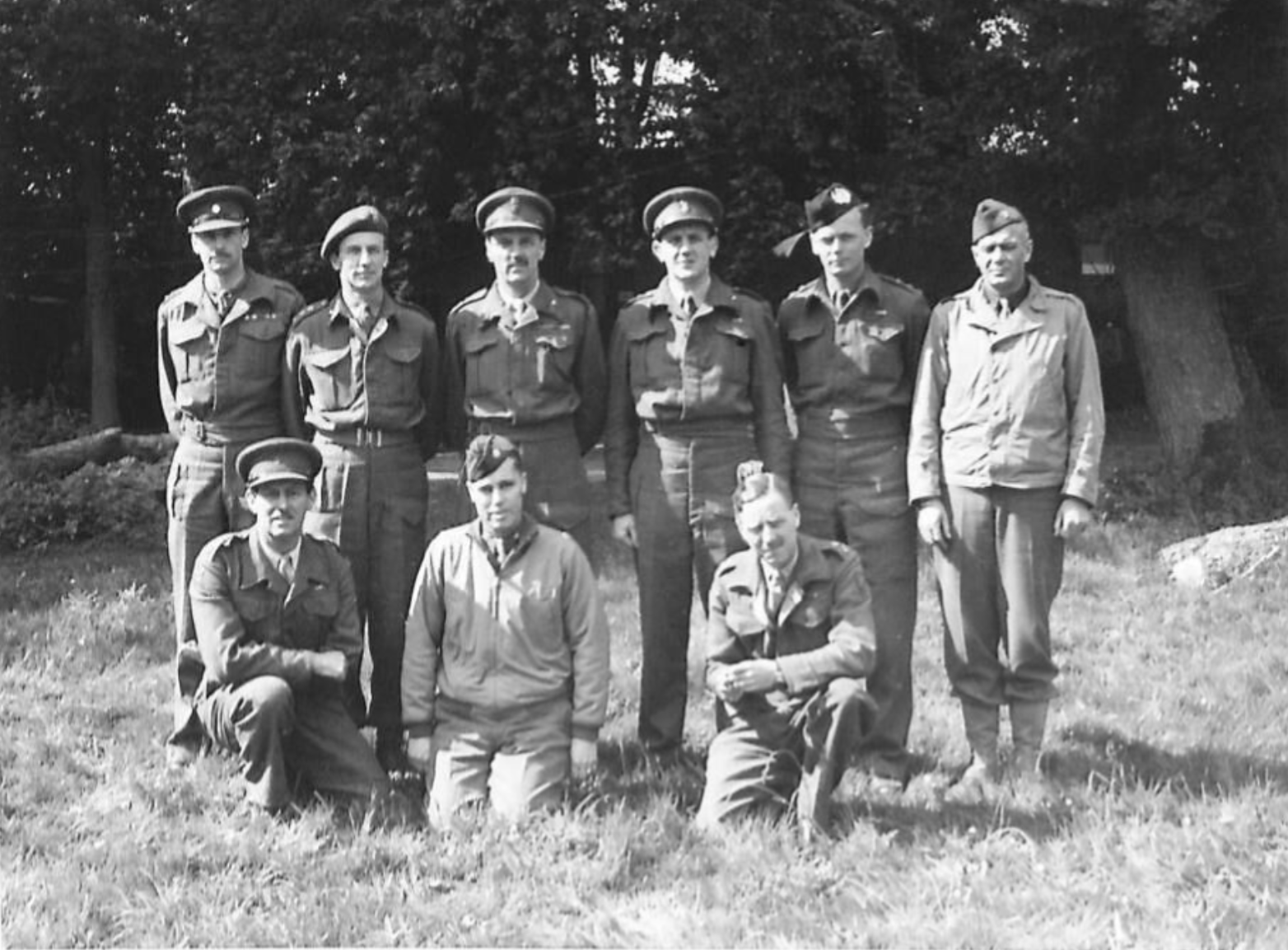
- Staff officers of the 21st Army Group, June 1944. Colonel R. G. S. Hobbs, wearing peaked cap, is stood third from the right in the back row.
- Born: 8 August 1908; Elham, Kent, England
- Died: 7 November 1977 (aged 69); Bromley, London, England
- Burial place: Camberley, Surrey, England
- Relatives: Sir William Stirling (grandfather); Reginald Francis Arthur Hobbs (father)
- Military career
- Allegiance: United Kingdom
- Branch: British Army
- Service years: 1928–1960
- Rank: Major-General
- Service number: 40387
- Unit: Royal Artillery
- Commands: 1st Division; Royal Military Academy Sandhurst; 2nd Infantry Brigade; 104th Regiment (Essex Yeomanry), Royal Horse Artillery
- Conflicts: Second World War
- Awards: Companion of the Order of the Bath; Distinguished Service Order; Officer of the Order of the British Empire

Major-General Reginald Geoffrey Stirling Hobbs, CB, DSO, OBE (8 August 1908 − 7 November 1977) was a British Army officer who served as Commandant of the Royal Military Academy Sandhurst from 1954 to 1957.

== Early life ==
Hobbs was the eldest son of Brigadier General Reginald Francis Arthur Hobbs and Frances Graham Stirling, daughter of Sir William Stirling. His brothers, Major Peter Graham Hobbs (1911–1942) and Lieutenant Colonel William Paul Hobbs (1914–1943), were both killed in action in the Second World War.

== Military career ==
Hobbs was commissioned into the Royal Artillery in 1928. He played rugby for England against South Africa at Twickenham in 1932, and then served in India. He fought in the Second World War, becoming commanding officer of the 104th Regiment (Essex Yeomanry), Royal Horse Artillery in the Western Desert taking part in the Battle of El Alamein in 1942 and then being deployed to North West Europe as a General Staff Officer.

After the war, Hobbs was chief of staff for Combined Operations. Then in 1950, he became Commander Royal Artillery for the 1st Division in the Middle East. He was made commander of the 2nd Infantry Brigade in 1951, Commandant of the Royal Military Academy Sandhurst in 1954 and Director of the Royal Artillery at the War Office in 1957. He went on to be General Officer Commanding 1st Division in 1959 before retiring in 1960.

In retirement Hobbs was President of the Regular Commissions Board, Honorary Colonel of the Essex Yeomanry and Colonel Commandant of the Royal Artillery from 1963 to 1968. He lived at Lerags House in Oban in Argyllshire.

Military offices
Preceded by Guy Gregson	General Officer Commanding 1st Division; 1959–1960	Succeeded by Alan Jolly
Preceded by David Dawnay	Commandant of the Royal Military Academy Sandhurst; 1954–1957	Succeeded by Ronald Urquhart
