= Whalley Stranach =

- Born: Whalley Seath Stranach; 22 August 1886 Durban, Natal
- Died: 17 January 1966
- School: Michaelhouse
- University: Guy's Hospital Medical School

Rugby union career
- Position: Forward
Amateur team(s)
Years	Team	Apps	(Points)
- Guy's Hospital, Barbarians, Kent
International career
Years	Team	Apps	(Points)
1910	Combined British	1	

Whalley Seath Stranach (22 August 1886, Durban-17 January 1966, Durban) was a South African Rugby player who toured Argentina with the Combined British team in 1910. Stranach was a dentist who qualified at Guy's Hospital in 1912. He played for Guy's, King's and St Thomas' RFC. He also played for Barbarians and Kent.

Following the 1910 tour, Stranach returned to England later that year.

== Military service ==
During the First World War, Stranach served as an officer with the University of London Officers' Training Corps and later with the London Regiment (Territorial Force). He was commissioned as a second lieutenant in October 1914, promoted to lieutenant in 1917, and served as a temporary captain from March 1918 until February 1919, retaining the rank of captain on relinquishing his commission.

== Family life ==
Whalley was a descendant of the Stranacks of Margate, the son of William Stranack and Elizabeth Jane Spencer. Whalley married Mabel Clare in Marylebone in 1916 , whom he divorced, remarrying Vivienne Strelitzia Royston on 7 February 1931 in Durban, Natal, South Africa. They had one son, John Seath Stranack, who emigrated to the United States.
