= Denis Pratten =

British Lions international rugby union player

- Full name: Denis E. Pratten
- Died: 18 October 1964 (aged 52)
- School: Bickley Park School
- University: Lincoln College, Oxford
- Notable relative: William Pratten (brother)
- Occupation: Schoolmaster

Rugby union career
- Position: Lock
International career
Years	Team	Apps	(Points)
1936	British Lions		

Denis E. Pratten was an English international rugby union player.

Pratten was educated at Bickley Park School in Bromsgrove and Lincoln College, Oxford.

A forward, Pratten toured Argentina with the British Lions in 1936 and featured in five fixtures, but missed the international against the Pumas having injured his knee. He played in the Blackheath second row alongside his brother William, who was capped for England, and took over as club captain in the 1936–37 season.

Pratten undertook his wartime service with the National Fire Service, then joined New Beacon School, where he served in various positions until taking over as headmaster in 1963, shortly before his death at age 52.

== See also ==
- List of British & Irish Lions players
