= Tom Knowles (rugby union) =

English rugby union player (1908–1985)

- Full name: Thomas Caldwell Knowles
- Born: 6 May 1908 West Bromwich, England
- Died: 12 September 1985 (aged 77) Birkenhead, England
- School: Ampleforth College

Rugby union career
- Position: Stand-off / Centre
International career
Years	Team	Apps	(Points)
1930, 1936	British Lions		
1931	England	1	(0)

Thomas Caldwell Knowles (6 May 1908 – 12 September 1985) was an English international rugby union player.

== Biography ==
Born in West Bromwich, Knowles learned his rugby at Ampleforth College, starting out as a fullback.

Knowles developed into a stand-off with his club Birkenhead Park and could also play centre three-quarter. For his solitary England cap, a 1931 Five Nations against Scotland at Murrayfield, Knowles played stand-off. He twice toured overseas with the British Lions, visiting New Zealand and Australia in 1930, then Argentina in 1936. A regular Cheshire representative, Knowles retired as the county's most capped player.

== See also ==
- List of British & Irish Lions players
- List of England national rugby union players
