= Peter Denny Strang =

British Isles international rugby union player

- Born: Peter Denny Strang; 26 April 1889 London, England
- School: Merchant Taylors School

Rugby union career
- Position: Forward
Amateur team(s)
Years	Team	Apps	(Points)
1907-	Old Merchant Taylors		
1910-	Surrey		
International career
Years	Team	Apps	(Points)
1910	Combined British	1	

Peter Denny Strang (born 26 April 1889; date of death unknown) was a British sportsman who played rugby union at an international level, touring Argentina with the 1910 Combined British rugby union side, an early incarnation of the British and Irish Lions.

== Early life ==
Peter Denny Strang was born on 26 April 1889, in London, the son of William, an artist and Agnes. He attended Merchant Taylors School where he featured in the School first fifteen rugby squad in 1904–05. He left school in 1905 and for some time studied at Aspatria Agricultural College in Cumberland.

== Rugby union ==
Strang played his rugby for his school's old boys club, Old Merchant Taylors. Although he was never selected to play rugby for England, he was selected to tour with the Combined British on the 1910 tour to Argentina where he played in what Argentina count as their first test match.

== Later life ==
After Aspatria College, he joined a firm of shipping agents, and was employed in Le Havre, France.

During World War I he voluntarily enlisted on 31 August 1914 with the London Scottish infantry regiment of the British Army as Private No.2522, going on to serve on the Western Front with its 1st Battalion in 1915 as a corporal. He subsequently received a commission as a subaltern with the Army Pay Corps. He resided in the 1920s at No.7 Hamilton Terrace, London NW8.
