= Vesey Boyle =

Irish rugby union player

- Full name: Charles Vesey Boyle
- Born: 2 July 1915 Dublin, Ireland
- Died: 3 March 2007 (aged 91) Devon, England
- School: The High School, Dublin
- University: Trinity College Dublin
- Occupation: Prosecutor / Judge

Rugby union career
- Position: Wing
International career
Years	Team	Apps	(Points)
1935–39	Ireland	9	(3)
1938	British Lions	2	(0)

Squadron Leader Charles Vesey Boyle DFC (2 July 1915 — 3 March 2007), known as Vesey Boyle, was an Irish rugby union international, bomber pilot, prosecutor and judge.

Born in Dublin, Boyle was the son of a solicitor and attended The High School, Dublin, before studying law at Trinity College. He captained the Dublin University XV, from where he gained the first of his nine Ireland caps in 1935, against the touring All Blacks. A winger, Boyle was also capped twice for the British Lions, on the 1938 tour to South Africa.

Boyle, enlisting as a Royal Artillery gunner, was fortunate to survive a bombardment in Dunkirk when the building his group was sheltering in was the only one left standing in a row of houses, before he was successfully evacuated. After transferring to the Royal Air Force in 1941, he flew in 101 operations as a bomber pilot, which included the Battle of El Alamein. He was subsequently rewarded with the Distinguished Flying Cross for gallantry.

Post war, Boyle moved into the Colonial Legal Service, serving as a prosecuting counsel during rebellions in Malaya and Kenya. He later served as a judge for the Special Court that tried EOKA guerillas in pre-independence Cyprus.

== See also ==
- List of Ireland national rugby union players
