= Bernard Gadney =

British Lions & England international rugby union player

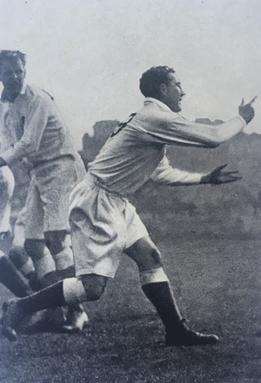
- Born: Bernard Cecil Gadney; 16 July 1909 Oxford, England
- Died: 15 November 2000 (aged 91) Ipswich, England
- Height: 6 ft 2 in (1.88 m)
- School: Dragon School; Stowe
- Occupation: Headmaster at Malsis School

Rugby union career
- Position: Scrum-half
Amateur team(s)
Years	Team	Apps	(Points)
- Richmond
1929–1939	Leicester Tigers		
International career
Years	Team	Apps	(Points)
1932–1938	England	14	(3)
1936	Great Britain	0	(0)

Bernard Cecil Gadney (16 July 1909 – 15 November 2000) was an English rugby union footballer who played as a scrum-half for Leicester Tigers, England and the British Lions. Gadney won 14 England caps between 1932 and 1938 and was captain on eight occasions.

Born in Oxford, he was educated at Dragon School and Stowe. His brother Cyril Gadney was an international rugby referee and President of the RFU. He made his Leicester debut in 1929 and went on to make 170 appearances for the club. He made his England debut v Ireland in 1932, and was appointed captain in 1934, becoming Leicester's first England captain, and leading England to the Triple Crown. In 1936 he led England to its first ever win against the All Blacks 13–0, a margin record that stood until 2012. The game came to be known as Obolensky's game. Later in the same year, he led a Great Britain away team to a 10–0 winning series against Argentina.

After retiring from international rugby he became headmaster of Malsis School, a prep school. During the Second World War he served as an officer in the Royal Navy.

From 1946 to 1949 he was President of the Oxfordshire RFU.

In 1947, he formed the England Rugby Internationals Club (E.R.I.C.) after he felt it appropriate that a retirement collection be made for outgoing RFU President, Sidney Coopper. His letter requesting donations was sent all over the world and the response was overwhelming.

He was named in the Leicester Tigers' team of the century, and shortly after his death was the first player to be inducted into the Museum of Rugby wall of fame in 2000.
