= John Francis Ashby =

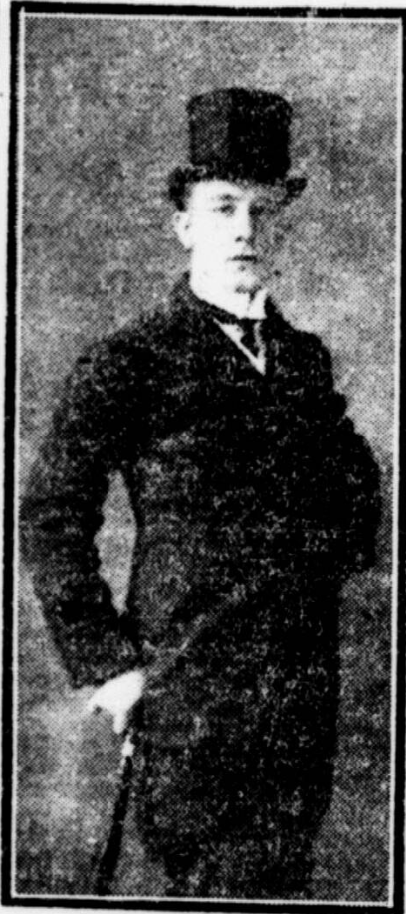
- Born: 5 May 1886 Ratby, Leicestershire, England
- Died: 16 May 1920 (aged 34) Surrey, England
- School: Calday Grange Grammar School; Liverpool College
- Occupation: Solicitor

Rugby union career
- Position: Forward
Amateur team(s)
Years	Team	Apps	(Points)
–	Birkenhead Park		
–	Cheshire		
International career
Years	Team	Apps	(Points)
1910	British & Irish Lions		

John Francis Ashby (5 May 1886 – 16 May 1920) was an English rugby union forward, solicitor and local councillor. He represented Cheshire at county level and toured Argentina in 1910 with the side retrospectively recognised as the British & Irish Lions.

== Early life and family ==
Ashby was born at Ratby, Leicestershire, the son of William Ashby, a farmer originally from Southam, Warwickshire, and Ellen Zilpah Ashby (née Sanders), who was born at Old Brentford, Middlesex. He had at least two siblings, Oliff Margery Ashby and George W. Ashby.

During childhood he moved to Hoylake on the Wirral, residing with his maternal uncle, the Rev. F. Sanders.

== Education ==
Ashby was educated at Calday Grange Grammar School and later at Liverpool College, where he became head boy and captain of the school.

At the age of sixteen he won the Thomas Hornby Classical Scholarship to the University of Liverpool and was also awarded a Cheshire County Exhibition worth £50 per year.

He graduated LL.B. with honours in June 1906 and later held the degrees of M.A. and LL.M. While at university he was active in debating and dramatic societies, served as editor of The Sphinx, and was a member of the University Volunteers. He represented the university in football, cricket and tennis.

== Legal and civic career ==
Ashby served his articles with Messrs. Tyrer, Kenion & Co., Liverpool, and Messrs. Burton, Yates & Hart, London. He passed the solicitor’s final examination with honours in 1909 and entered into partnership with Wilfred Clothier, founding the firm of Ashby and Clothier in Liverpool.

In 1911, aged 24, he was elected to represent North Ward on the Hoylake and West Kirby Urban District Council, winning by a majority of 132 votes. He also served as a member of the Wirral Board of Guardians and was regarded as one of the youngest men in the country to hold both offices simultaneously.

He resigned from public life shortly before the end of the First World War owing to ill health.

== Rugby career ==
Ashby played rugby union for Birkenhead Park and represented Cheshire at county level.

In 1910 he was selected for the English Rugby Union tour of Argentina. Although organised under the auspices of the Rugby Football Union, the tour was later retrospectively recognised as part of the history of the British & Irish Lions.

The touring side won all six of its matches, including a 28–3 victory over Argentina in Buenos Aires on 12 June 1910, the first Test match in Argentine rugby history.

== First World War ==
Following the outbreak of the First World War, Ashby was commissioned as a second lieutenant in the Cheshire Regiment. He was later promoted and served overseas in France. He was wounded in 1915 and subsequently promoted to captain.

The strain of active service adversely affected his health and he was eventually invalided home and discharged. From September 1916 to June 1918 he served as Secretary of the Forging and Casting Department at the Ministry of Munitions.

His brother, George W. Ashby, was killed while serving in France during the war.

== Death ==
Ashby died in Surrey on 16 May 1920 at the age of 34. His death followed a prolonged illness resulting from his wartime service.
