= Curly Hammond =

England international rugby union player

- Born: Charles Edward Lucas Hammond; 3 October 1879 Pontefract, Yorkshire
- Died: 15 April 1963 (aged 83) (registered in) Ross (aged 83 years 194 days)
- School: Bedford School

Rugby union career
- Position: Forward
International career
Years	Team	Apps	(Points)
1905–1908	England	8	(Pts:0; Tries:0; Conv:0; Pens:0; Drop:0)

Curly Hammond (1879–1963) was a rugby union international who represented England from 1905 to 1908. He also captained his country.

== Early life ==
Curly Hammond was born on 3 October 1879 in Pontefract and educated at Bedford School.

== Rugby union career ==
Hammond made his international debut on 18 March 1905 at Athletic Ground, Richmond in the England vs Scotland match. Of the 8 matches he played for his national side he was on the winning side on 3 occasions. He played his final match for England on 8 February 1908 at Athletic Ground, Richmond in the England vs Ireland match.
