= Dick Uren =

England international rugby union player

Richard Uren (26 February 1926 – 30 May 2010 (aged 84)) was a rugby union player who played for Waterloo R.F.C. and represented the England national rugby union team four times. He represented Cheshire at both rugby union and golf and was also a successful racing sailor.

== Biography ==
Uren was born at West Kirby on the Wirral Peninsula. His father, Harold Uren, was an association footballer who played as an amateur for Liverpool F.C. and as a professional for Everton F.C. Dick Uren was the youngest of seven children; one of his brothers, Harold Uren, was capped by the British Lions at rugby union.

Uren was educated at Calday Grange Grammar School and served as a navigator with the Fleet Air Arm in World War 2. After the war he went to the Midlands Agricultural College before joining the family firm of food merchants, H. J. Uren & Sons. He worked for the firm until he retired in 1986 and continued to go to the office until two days before his death. Uren married his wife, Diana, in 1962 and they had two sons and a daughter.

== Rugby union career ==
Dick Uren played for Waterloo R.F.C. He represented the Cheshire county team and on one occasion kicked a penalty from half-way which put Cheshire into the final of the County Championship, a final which they won. At international level Uren was capped four times by England as a full-back. He played three games in the 1948 Five Nations Championship and one final game in the 1952 Five Nations Championship. Uren scored two conversions in his first international and one penalty in his second, for a total of seven points for England. He played for the Barbarians and was selected for the 1950 British Lions tour to New Zealand and Australia but turned down the invitation for business reasons.

== Other sports ==
Uren represented Cheshire at golf between 1966 and reduced his handicap to scratch. As a racing sailor Uren led teams from West Kirby sailing club to win a competition called the Wilson Trophy in 1957 and 1959.
