= Doug Prentice =

British Lions & England international rugby union player

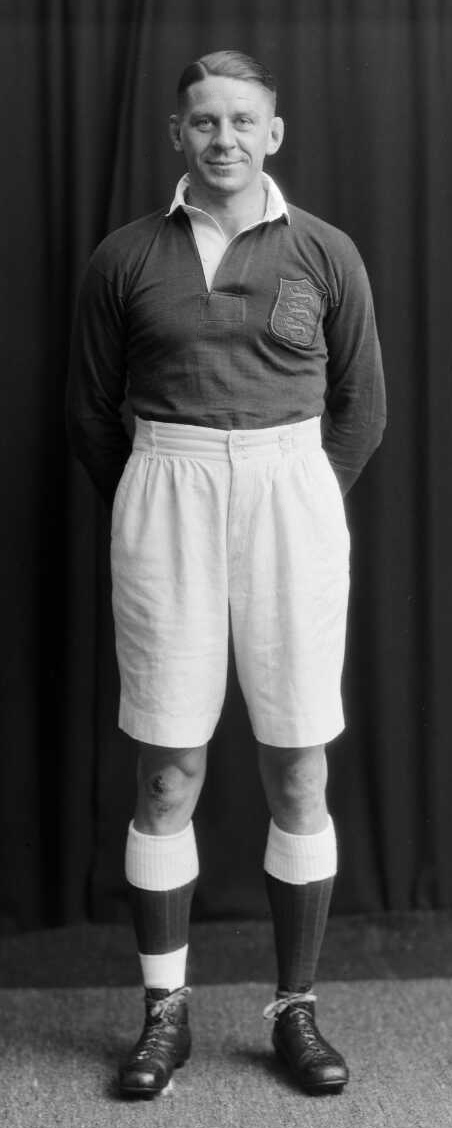
- Prentice in New Zealand in 1930
- Born: Frank Douglas Prentice; 21 September 1898 Leicester, England
- Died: 3 October 1962 (aged 64) Paddington, England
- School: Wyggeston School

Rugby union career
- Position(s): Forward; Prop; No. 8 Lock
Senior career
Years	Team	Apps	(Points)
1923–1931	Leicester Tigers	239	(575)
International career
Years	Team	Apps	(Points)
1928	England	3	(0)
1930	British Lions	2	(6)

Frank Douglas Prentice (21 September 1898 – 3 October 1962) was an English rugby union player and administrator who played 239 games for Leicester Tigers between 1923 and 1931, was captain of the 1930 British Lions tour to New Zealand and Australia and served as Secretary of the Rugby Football Union between 1947 and 1962.

== Playing career ==
Despite attending a rugby playing school in Leicester Prentice was a keen footballer in his youth. During The First World War he served with the Royal Artillery and, when posted to France, joined the ANZACs whose enthusiasm for rugby converted him. He was badly wounded at Passchendaele in 1917.

Prentice began his rugby career with local side Westleigh, at the time Leicester was strictly an invitation only club and his debut for side came on 26 November 1923 away to Neath, Tigers lost 37–6 but Prentice scored one of Leicester's two tries. Prentice quickly established himself in the Leicester's first choice side playing 24 of the season's 30 remaining games. Forwards' positions were not specialized in this period and he is recorded simply as playing "forward" until the 1927–28 season. From then onward Prentice is recorded as having mainly played prop for Leicester, despite his international caps coming at either Number 8 or Lock. Prentice was a regular try scorer for Leicester scoring 7 tries in his first season and 8 in 31 games the next. By 1926 Prentice had become Leicester's secondary goal-kicker, taking the duties when club captain Harold Day was not selected.

He succeeded Day as both captain and place-kicker for the 1928–29 season where he was top scorer with 134 points in 31 games and on 11 February 1928 made his international debut for England in a 7–6 win over Ireland at Lansdowne Road. Prentice played in England's next two games against France and Scotland to secure the 1928 Five Nations Championship and the grandslam. Leicester did not prosper however recording more losses than wins for the first time since 1889–90. His second season as captain saw a return to regular winning ways; Tigers won 26 of their 39 games whilst Prentice was again top scorer with 106 points in 26 matches.

Prentice was selected to take part in the 1930 British Lions tour to New Zealand and Australia, and after former Tigers teammate Wavell Wakefield was forced to withdraw he also became captain of the tour. At the age of 34 and past his prime playing days Prentice only played in 12 of the 29 matches. He did captain the side in the second test against the New Zealanders and the sole test against Australia, both of which were lost.

He returned from the tour and played a final season for Leicester, featuring in 24 games he top-scored with 104 points despite missing the first 13 whilst on the Lions tour. On 18 April 1931 he was given the honour of captaining the side in his final appearance, a 25–5 win against Blackheath at Welford Road.

== Administration career ==
After retiring from playing rugby in 1931 Prentice moved into the administration of the game. He became an England national team selector in 1932 and was manager of the 1936 British Lions tour to Argentina. He became Secretary of the Rugby Football Union in 1947, at this point he stopped being a selector for the national side, and held the position for 15 years until ill health forced him to retire in 1962. During the Second World War he served in the Royal Army Service Corps and was taken prisoner.
