= Roderick MacLennan =

England international rugby union player

- Full name: Roderick Ross Forrest MacLennan
- Born: 23 December 1903 Glasgow, Scotland
- Died: 2 January 1986 (aged 82) Nairn, Scotland

Rugby union career
- Position: Prop
International career
Years	Team	Apps	(Points)
1925	England	3	(0)

Captain Roderick Ross Forrest MacLennan (23 December 1903 – 2 January 1986) was a Scottish rugby union player who represented England during the 1920s.

Born in Glasgow, MacLennan was the son of a Gordon Highlanders officer from Croy and received his early education at Aberdeen Grammar School, before the family relocated to London. He finished his schooling at Merchant Taylors' School, where he was rugby captain, as well as a public school middleweight boxing champion.

MacLennan, a Gaelic speaker, played his rugby in England with London Scottish and Middlesex. In the 1925 Five Nations, MacLennan gained three England caps, featuring in the front row against Ireland, Scotland and France.

In World War II, MacLennan served with the Intelligence Corps and retired in 1945 with the honorary rank of captain.

MacLennan was a county councillor in Scotland after moving to his father's hometown Croy in 1965.

== See also ==
- List of England national rugby union players
