= Harold Uren (rugby union) =

English rugby union player (1912–1993)

- Full name: Harold John Uren
- Born: 1912 Wirral, Cheshire, England
- Died: February 1993 (aged 81) Birkenhead, England
- School: Harold Uren Sr. (father); Dick Uren (brother)

Rugby union career
- Position: Fullback
International career
Years	Team	Apps	(Points)
1936	British Lions		

Harold John Uren (1912 – 1993) was an English international rugby union player.

Raised in Cheshire, Uren was the son of association footballer Harold Uren, who played in the midfield for Liverpool, and an elder brother of England rugby fullback Dick Uren. He attended Calday Grange Grammar School.

Uren, a fullback, played for Waterloo and the Cheshire RFU. He was selected to play for England in the 'Victory Internationals' of 1946 against Wales and Scotland (twice). In 1936, Uren was a member of the British Lions squad that toured Argentina, where he featured in nine fixtures including the international against the Pumas. He met his future wife during his time in Argentina.

== See also ==
- List of British & Irish Lions players
