= John Gordon A'Bear =

British Lions international rugby union footballer

John A'Bear
- Born: John Gordon A'Bear; 16 July 1913 Cheltenham, Gloucestershire, England
- Died: 3 October 1979 (aged 66) Gloucester, England
- School: The Crypt School

Rugby union career
- Position: Lock
Amateur team(s)
Years	Team	Apps	(Points)
1933-1939	Gloucester Rugby		
1935-39	Gloucestershire		
International career
Years	Team	Apps	(Points)
1936	British and Irish Lions	1	

John A'Bear (16 July 1913 – 3 October 1979) was an English rugby union player. He played club rugby for Gloucester and was their youngest captain. Although he never won a cap for England, he did tour Argentina with the British Isles team in 1936.

== Early life ==
John Gordon A’Bear was born in Cheltenham on 16 July 1913, the son of James Horace A'Bear (1879–1945), an ironmonger, and his wife, Nellie (née Winstone) (1885–1958). He had an older sister, Lottie, (born 1912) and two younger siblings, Charles (b. 1916) and Nellie (b. 1921). He was educated at The Crypt School, Gloucester.

== Rugby career ==
John played for Gloucester from 1933 until 1939 and was also selected to represent his county, Gloucestershire, from 1935 to 1939. He was a part of the County Championship winning side of 1936–37. At the age of 24, A'Bear became Gloucester's youngest Captain and continued his captaincy the following season. His record in his first year of captaincy was 29 wins from 36 matches.

As a second row, he formed a partnership with Digger Morris, and was best man at Digger Morris's wedding. They were also known for their rendition of "The Pig Song" as after-match entertainment.

John was never capped for England, but was an international due to his selection for the tour Argentina with the British Isles team in 1936. In 1936, he was a reserve for an England trial at Bristol.

During the Second World War, he played a number of matches for Gloucester and for representative sides but, due to business commitments, retired in 1946.

== Family and later life ==
John married his first cousin, May A'Bear (born 1914, Montreal) in Quebec, Canada. She was the daughter of Alfred A'Bear and Edith Stirling. They had two children, both born in Gloucester, Suzanne (born 1942) and Judith (born 1944). John died in 1979.
