= Reginald Hobbs (British Army officer, born 1878) =

British Army general & England international rugby union player (1878-1953)

Brigadier-General Reginald Hobbs CB CMG DSO
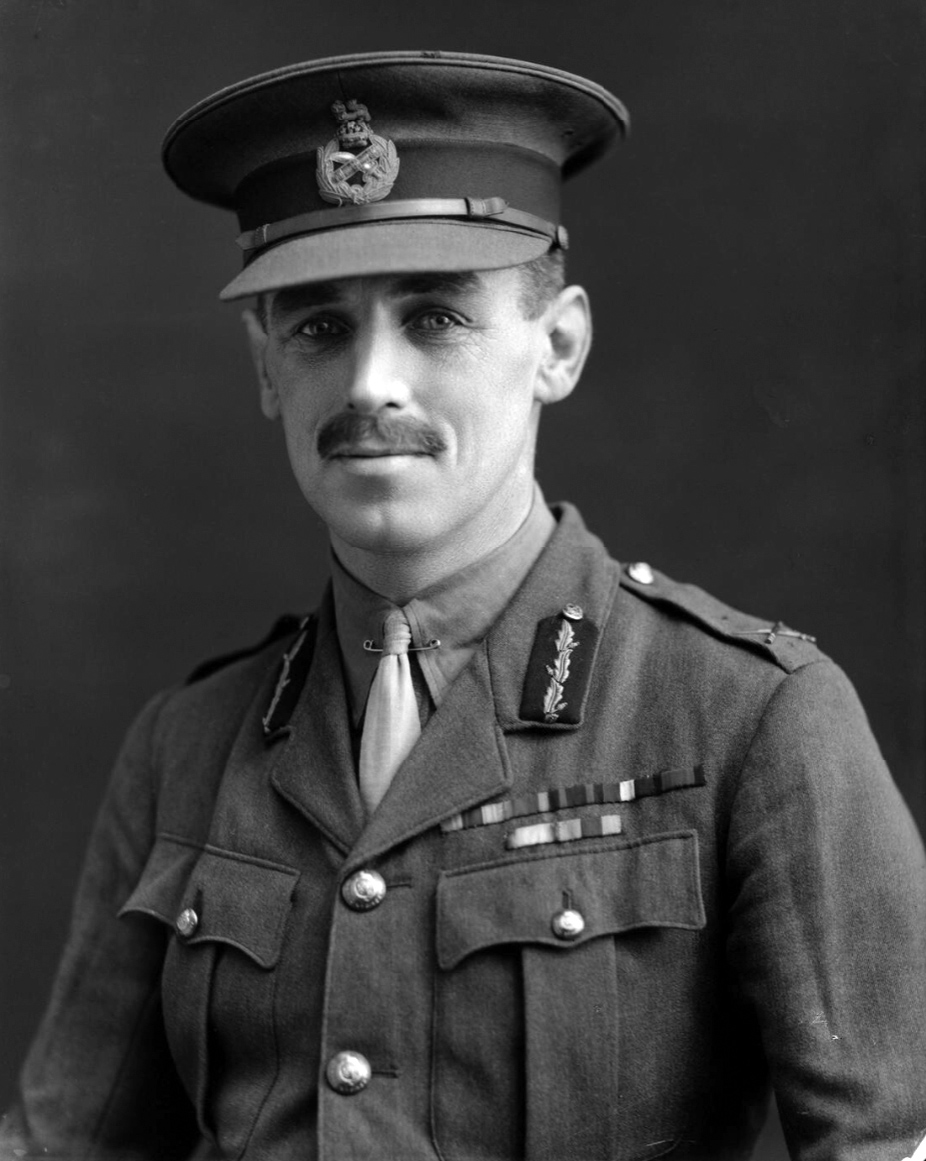
- Hobbs in 1919
- Born: 30 January 1878; Tyldesley, Lancashire
- Died: 10 July 1953 (aged 75); Sutton Veny, Wiltshire
- Relatives: Sir William Stirling (father-in-law); Reginald Hobbs (son)
- Military career
- Allegiance: United Kingdom
- Branch: British Army
- Service years: 1898–1931
- Rank: Brigadier-General
- Conflicts: Second Boer War; Somaliland campaign First World War
- Awards: Companion of the Order of the Bath; Companion of the Order of St Michael and St George; Distinguished Service Order

Brigadier-General Reginald Francis Arthur Hobbs, CB, CMG, DSO (30 January 1878 – 10 July 1953) was a British Army officer who was Brigadier in charge of Administration, Western Command.

== Early life and education ==
Hobbs was born in Tyldesley, Lancashire, to Captain Simpson Hackett Hobbs of the 89th Foot, a wire manufacturer, and Sarah Bayley. His elder brother, Lieutenant Colonel Charles James Willoughby Hobbs, died of wounds in the First World War. He was educated at Wellington College and the Royal Military Academy, Woolwich. Playing as a forward, Hobbs was capped twice for the England national rugby union team.

== Military career ==
Hobbs was gazetted to the Royal Engineers in 1898. He served in the Second Boer War (1899–1902), the Somaliland campaign in 1903 and in the Gold Coast in 1904–05. From 1907–11, he was technical supervisor at the School of Musketry. He returned to the field in the First World War, serving as assistant adjutant and quartermaster general in France and Italy until February 1918.

Following the war, Hobbs served as Brigadier in charge of Administration, Western Command, until his retirement in 1931.

Hobbs was awarded the Distinguished Service Order in 1901, and appointed a Companion of the Order of St Michael and St George in the 1915 Birthday Honours and a Companion of the Order of the Bath in the 1931 New Year Honours.

== Personal life ==
Hobbs married Frances Graham Stirling, daughter of Sir William Stirling. They had three sons, two of whom were killed in action in North Africa during the Second World War: Major General Reginald Hobbs (1908–1977), Major Peter Graham Hobbs (1911–1942) of the Royal Artillery, killed in action in Libya, and Lieutenant Colonel William Paul Hobbs (1914–1943), killed in action in Tunisia.

Hobbs died at his home in Sutton Veny, near Warminster, Wiltshire, on 10 July 1953 aged 75.
