= Martin Tweed =

- Born: Martin Baird Moore Tweed; 12 May 1890
- Died: 23 April 1974 Aged 83
- University: Guy's Hospital Medical School

Rugby union career
- Position: Forward
Amateur team(s)
Years	Team	Apps	(Points)
- Guy's Hospital
International career
Years	Team	Apps	(Points)
1910	Combined British	1	

Martin Baird Moore Tweed (12 May 1890 – 23 April 1974) was a medical doctor and sportsman from New Zealand who played rugby union at an international level, touring Argentina with the 1910 Combined British rugby union side, an early incarnation of the British & Irish Lions.

== Early life ==
Tweed was born in New Zealand. He went to England to study medicine at London's Guy's Hospital. There in 1916 he received the LMSSA Lond. qualification and in 1918 the MRCS Eng. and LRCP Lond.

== Rugby union ==
Whilst at Guy's Hospital Tweed represented the medical school in rugby union. Such was the prominence of Guy's at the time that his exploits were reported back in New Zealand. In 1914 his part in the Guy's vs St Thomas clash was reported:

"A. H. Harkness, Martin B. Tweed; and A. B. Danby—all New Zealand medical students at Guy's Hospital— were on the winning side yesterday, in the match against St. Thomas Hospital team. The favourites scored three goals and three tries to a dropped goal. From beginning to end the match was a rollicking, tearaway one of rushes and tackles and random passes."

Tweed was selected to tour with the Combined British on the 1910 tour to Argentina where he played in what Argentina count as their first test match. The tour was not officially sanctioned by the four home unions and in fact was promoted as the English Rugby Union side, but given it contained at least three Scots as well as other nationalities, the Argentine press referred to it as the Combined British and it is often retrospectively referred to as an early incarnation of the British & Irish Lions. Tweed never represented his native New Zealand.

== Career, military and later life ==
Before his participation in the First World War, Tweed was one of those invited to the 19 December 1914 reception given by the High Commissioner to the captain and officers of H.M.S. New Zealand. He continued to study during the war, but was actively involved in military medical duties under the remit of the New Zealand Medical Corps. In August 1917 he was a groomsman at the wedding of Lieutenant Ralph Fitzßoger B. Beetham, N.Z.M.R. where the congregation consisted chiefly of New Zealand nurses from the hospital at Walton-on-Thames, the site of the major New Zealand hospital in the UK where Martin Tweed spent some time.

On his return to New Zealand after the war, he returned to duty with the New Zealand Expeditionary Force at the rank of Captain having already served in the UK, and on enlistment listed his mother as his next of kin, situated in Hobson Street, Wellington, New Zealand. His embarkation date was 28 February 1919 from Wellington, aboard the Marama, which was acting as the Hospital Ship. No. 2.

During his time in the New Zealand Medical Corps. he rose to the rank of colonel and afterwards worked at Wellington Hospital. He was the chief advisor to the Royal New Zealand Society for the Health of Women and Children.

In 1972 he continued to be registered as living in Heretaunga, Wellington. He married Margaret Moss (née Elvery) on 8 July 1919 and had a two sons, William Moss Elvery Tweed (born 12 June 1925; died ??), who followed his fathers footsteps and studied at Guy's Hospital as a Gynaecologist, Phillipa Tweed (born 24 December 1922) and John Moore Tweed (born in Carterton on 27 September 1920; died 19 February 2013), and who went on himself to become a Physician and Rheumatologist, being awarded the MBE in 1991.
