= Calday Grange Grammar School =

Boys grammar school, Wirral, England

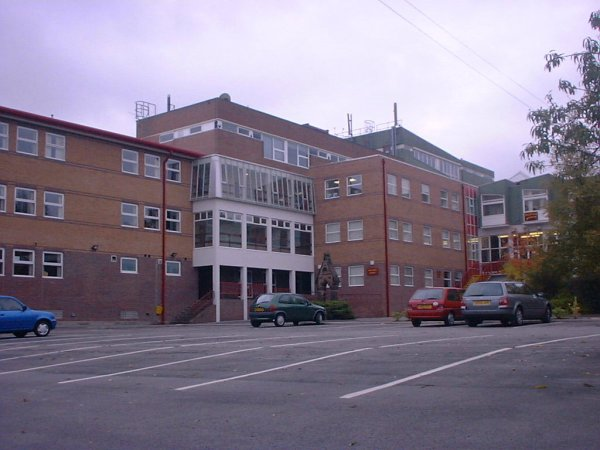
- School crest bearing the school’s motto - Nisi Dominus Frustra (“Without God, [it is] in vain") Exterior of the Walker and Hawkins buildings, prior to extensive refurbishment

Location
- Grammar School Lane; West Kirby, Wirral, CH48 8GG; England; 53.3675°N 3.163°W

Information
- Type: Grammar school
- Motto: Nisi Dominus Frustra
- Established: 1636; 390 years ago
- Department for Education URN: 139144 Tables
- Ofsted: Reports
- Chair of Governors: Martin Underwood
- Headmaster: Stephen Gray
- Gender: Boys (co-educational sixth form)
- Age: 11 to 18
- Enrolment: 1,509 (Jan 2024)
- Houses: Glegg; Bennett; Hollowell
Colour
- Alumni: "Old Caldeians"
- Website: calday.co.uk

Calday Grange Grammar School, commonly shortened to Calday, is a non-denominational, selective boys' grammar school in West Kirby on the Wirral Peninsula, England. Founded in 1636, the school admits boys aged 11 to 18 and, since 1985, girls for the sixth form only. The school hosts the Wirral Able Children Centre, and has been awarded Sportsmark Gold and Investors in People status. It was previously a specialist technology and modern foreign languages (MFL) college under the former high performing specialist schools (HPSS) programme.

By September 2019, a total of 1,492 students were in attendance at the school, of which, 399 belonged to the co–educational sixth form.

== Overview ==
The school is situated close to the Dee Estuary coastline of the Wirral Peninsula. Students travel primarily from the Wirral, Cheshire and North Wales areas. The school occupies ten school buildings, with all-weather courts, a swimming pool, sports hall, fitness suite and outdoor recreation areas within the main grounds.

Additionally, the school’s Glasspool Field on nearby Telegraph Road, offers three rugby union pitches, a cricket field, athletics facilities, artificial turf hockey pitches and tennis courts.

== History ==
Founded in 1636, Calday Grange Grammar School is one of the oldest schools in England and Wirral's oldest surviving school. Originally established by local landowner William Glegg, the school has remained at its present site on Grammar School Lane since opening in the 17th Century. It is located in Grange, a suburb of West Kirby (historically known as Calday Grange, giving its name to the school).

On 1 January 2009, the ownership of the school's land and buildings was transferred to the Calday Grange Trust, a charitable partnership between Calday Grange Grammar School, the University of Liverpool, Unilever Research and Development and Maestro Services. Calday Grange Grammar School was the first Wirral school to convert to Trust Status.

In September 2011, the school informed parents, "The School has received notification from Companies House that the Calday Grange Trust Company has been dissolved. This has been notified by the Governing Body who contacted Wirral Local Authority and indicated their wish to revert to the Foundation Schools Instrument of Government".

In July 2011, the process for converting to an academy school was begun, and the school converted to academy status with effect from 1 January 2013.

== House system ==
Calday uses a house system, a long-standing, integral part of the school community. Heads of House work together to create a strong student voice and further the community spirit of the school.

The three Houses, named after former Headmasters; Bennett, Glegg, and Hollowell, are each represented by their respective colour (seen below). Student uniforms, depending on which house they belong to, differ by the tie and the school’s crest worn on blazers and pullovers. Each of these incorporate the student's applicable house colour. Ties can also differ depending on sporting or musical achievements.

Bennett
Hollowell
Glegg

== Academic performance ==
In 2015 96% of Year 11 students achieved 5 GCSE grades A* to C with 96.2% gaining 5 A* to C grades including English and Maths. Four students achieved A* in 10 or more subjects.

In 2019 the school was inspected and judged 'Good', repeating the outcome of Ofsted inspections in 2016 and 2010. There was a further inspection in December 2024 reiterating the previous rating.

== Extracurricular ==
International travel and volunteering opportunities for students include the Refilwe Community Project in South Africa, which the school has been involved in for over 10 years. A number of opportunities for international trips are offered by the school.

Students have also been involved with various independent entrepreneurial pursuits.

Students can to take part in the Duke of Edinburgh Award, as well as a variety of enrichment activities and clubs including Fencing, Cooking, Robotics, Classics, Gardening, and 3D Design, amongst others.

Private music tuition is also available to students, with instrumental, composition and vocal lessons currently taken by approximately 200 students at Calday.

The school is ranked 7th for sporting achievement, with the November 2019 edition of School Sport magazine placing Calday in the top 1% of schools in the country for sporting outcomes.

The school has maintained a Combined Cadet Force since 1916, when a unit of the Officers' Training Corps was first formed.

== Notable alumni ==
- John Francis Ashby, English rugby player and member of the 1910 British Lions tour to Argentina
- Andrew Baddeley, athlete in the 2008 and 2012 Olympics
- Daniel Craig, English actor known for his role as James Bond in the 007 films
- James Hype, English DJ and record producer
- Philip May, banker and husband of former Prime Minister Theresa May
- Andy McCluskey, singer/songwriter best known as the lead vocalist for OMD
- Sam Quek, British field hockey player, winning Olympic gold in 2016
- Dick Uren, England international rugby union player
- Peter Venables, psychologist
