= Sidney Herbert Milnes =

- Born: 1880 Bury, Lancashire, England
- Died: 6 August 1915 (aged 34–35) Gallipoli, Ottoman Empire

Rugby union career
- Position: Three-quarter / Full-back
Amateur team(s)
Years	Team	Apps	(Points)
–	Manchester		
–	Lancashire		

Sidney Herbert Milnes (1880 – 6 August 1915) was an English rugby union footballer who played for Manchester Football Club and was selected for the 1910 British Rugby Union tour of Argentina. He later served as a British Army officer and was killed during the Gallipoli Campaign in the First World War.

== Early life and education ==
Milnes was born in 1880 to Edmund Milnes, a drysalter and cotton spinner, and Isabella Jane Milnes of Bury, Lancashire. Contemporary records indicate that the family employed domestic staff. He was educated at St David’s School, Reigate, and later at Marlborough College.

== Sporting career ==
=== Rugby union ===
Milnes played for Manchester Football Club from 1900 until 1913, primarily as a three-quarter back and occasionally as a full-back. During this period he also acted as a referee.

In April 1910 he was selected as a member of the Combined British Rugby Union team touring Argentina under the management of R. V. Stanley. Contemporary press reports listed him as representing Manchester among the three-quarter backs. The touring side won six matches during the visit. A report on the team’s return noted that Milnes remained for a further week in Buenos Aires after the main party had departed.

In September 1912 he was elected an officer of the Lancashire Football Union representing Bury, and again served as county representative in 1913. He was also a member of the Selection Committee for the County Club.

=== Cricket and tennis ===
Milnes played cricket for Bury Cricket Club in 1901.

He was an enthusiastic tennis player and a member of the Manchester Tennis and Racquet Club.

== Professional life ==
Milnes was a partner in the firm of Milnes Brothers and Hoyle, cotton spinners and manufacturers operating Egyptian Mills at Elton, near Bury.

== Military service ==
Milnes was commissioned as a Second Lieutenant in the 1st Volunteer Battalion of the Lancashire Fusiliers in May 1900. He was promoted to Lieutenant in 1908 and later served as a Captain in the 5th Battalion, Lancashire Fusiliers, during the First World War.

His battalion landed at Gallipoli in early May 1915. On 6 August 1915, during fighting for a position known as “The Vineyard”, he was reported missing. Contemporary reports stated that he had been seen severely wounded while lying on the ground, and that Quartermaster-Sergeant James Smith was killed attempting to rescue him. A subsequent letter received by his family stated that he had been badly wounded and died shortly afterwards. His death was not officially confirmed until March 1917.

He was 35 years old at the time of his death. His brother, Major H. N. Milnes, served in the same battalion, and another brother, Captain James Milnes of the 9th Battalion Lancashire Fusiliers, wrote from hospital in Alexandria informing the family of Sidney’s disappearance.

== Commemoration ==
Milnes is commemorated on the Helles Memorial at Gallipoli. He is also named on the Manchester Municipal College of Technology War Memorial (Sackville Building, University of Manchester), on his father’s gravestone at Bury Christ Church, Walmersley, and on the Manchester Tennis & Racquet Club War Memorial in Salford.
