= John Brett (rugby union) =

- Full name: John Alfred Brett
- Born: 26 October 1915 Wetherby, Yorkshire, England
- Died: 10 August 1996 (aged 80) Salisbury, Wiltshire, England
- School: Durham School
- University: St Edmund Hall, Oxford
- Occupation: Schoolmaster

Rugby union career
- Position: Prop
International career
Years	Team	Apps	(Points)
1936	British Lions		

John Alfred Brett (26 October 1915 – 10 August 1996) was an English international rugby union player.

Brett, the son of a solicitor, was born in Wetherby, Yorkshire and educated at Durham School.

A prop, Brett featured in eight fixtures for the British Lions on the 1936 tour to Argentina, including the one-off match against the Pumas. He captained Oxford University in the 1937 Varsity Match, while a pupil of St Edmund Hall.

Brett served with the Royal Artillery during World War II and was left with a glass eye after being badly injured in Normandy. From 1958 to 1967, Brett was the Headmaster of Durham School.

== See also ==
- List of British & Irish Lions players
