= Alex Palmer (rugby union) =

British Lions & England international rugby union player

Alex Palmer OBE
- Full name: Alexander Croydon Palmer
- Born: 2 August 1887 Dunedin, New Zealand
- Died: 16 October 1963 (aged 76) Mid-East Surrey, England
- School: Waitaki Boys' High School
- University: University of Otago; University of London
- Occupation: Surgeon

Rugby union career
- Position: Wing three-quarter
International career
Years	Team	Apps	(Points)
1909	England	2	(10)
1910	British Lions		

Alexander Croydon Palmer (2 August 1887 – 16 October 1963) was a New Zealand-born surgeon and England international rugby union player.

== Biography ==
Born in Dunedin, Palmer attended the University of Otago, before further studies at the University of London. He had played rugby at university in New Zealand and was capped twice for England as a wing three-quarter in the 1909 Home Nations. Most notably, Palmer contributed two tries on debut at Lansdowne Road, to help defeat an Ireland side that were unable to contend with the pace of England's three-quarters. He toured Argentina with the British Lions in 1910.

Palmer graduated with honours from the University of London in 1910 with a MBBS degree.

During World War I, Palmer was an acting major and head of the Surgical Division of No. 32 Stationary Hospital, for which he was appointed an Officer of the British Empire (OBE).

Palmer was a consulting obstetrician and gynaecological surgeon at King's College Hospital.

== See also ==
- List of England national rugby union players
- List of British & Irish Lions players
