= William Lovat Fraser =

British Lions international rugby union player & Scotland international cricketer

- Born: William Lovat Fraser; 7 November 1884 Perth, Scotland
- Died: 21 November 1968 (aged 84) Scone, Perthshire, Scotland
- School: Merchiston Castle School

Rugby union career
- Position: Forward
Amateur team(s)
Years	Team	Apps	(Points)
- Merchistonian FC
International career
Years	Team	Apps	(Points)
1910	Combined British	1	((3 = 1 try))

William Lovat Fraser (7 November 1884 – 21 November 1968) was a Scottish sportsman who played cricket and rugby union at an international level, representing Scotland in cricket and touring Argentina with the 1910 Combined British rugby union side, an early incarnation of the British and Irish Lions.

== Early life ==
William Lovat Fraser was born in 1884 in Perth, Scotland. He was the older brother of Alan Fraser who also played cricket for Scotland (in 1921). Both attended Merchiston Castle School.

== Rugby union ==
Fraser played his rugby for his school's old boys club, Merchistonian FC. Although he was never selected to play rugby for Scotland, he was selected to tour with the Combined British on the 1910 tour to Argentina where he played in what Argentina count as their first test match. Notably, Fraser scored the first try of that match.

== Cricket ==
Lovat Fraser was also a noted cricketer. He had played at Merchiston Castle School and continued to play for his school's old boys side. He was predominantly a bowler (right-arm medium pace). He played his three first-class matches between 1909 and 1913. The first match was on 22 July 1909 when Scotland faced Ireland in Scotland, at North Inch, Perth. Although he was out for a duck in Scotland's first innings, his contribution of 3 wickets in Ireland's first innings, and a five wicket haul in their second went a long way towards Scotland's win by an innings and 132 runs. Three years later he was in the Scotland side that faced Australia on 11 July 1912. The match was drawn and Fraser once again registered a duck but took a wicket. His final first class match was in a 10 July 1913 encounter with Ireland at the Grange Cricket Club Ground, Raeburn Place, Edinburgh. Although the match was drawn, Fraser hit a first class high of 44 in the first innings and took six wickets over the two innings. In 1919 he again played for Scotland against the Australian Imperial Force Touring XI and in 1921 against Australia, but neither match was deemed first-class.
