= Peter Hordern (rugby union) =

RAF officer and British Lions & England international rugby union player

- Full name: Peter Cotton Hordern
- Born: 13 May 1907 Berkhamsted, England
- Died: 22 June 1988 (aged 81) Peterborough, England
- School: Brighton College
- University: University of Oxford
- Notable relative: Michael Hordern (brother)
- Occupation: RAF Officer / Teacher

Rugby union career
- Position: Back-row forward
International career
| Years | Team | Apps | (Points) |
| 1931–34 | England | 4 | (0) |
| 1936 | British Lions | | |

Wing Commander Peter Cotton Hordern AFC (13 May 1907 – 22 June 1988) was a Royal Air Force officer and England international rugby union player of the 1930s.

== Rugby career ==
An Oxford blue in 1928, Hordern played rugby for Blackheath, Gloucester and Newport during the 1930s. He was primarily a back-row forward, but could also play as a prop, while at Newport was utilised as a makeshift centre three-quarter. Capped four times, Hordern represented England across the 1931 Five Nations and 1934 Home Nations tournaments. He also gained regular selection for the Barbarians and in 1936 toured Argentina with the British Lions.

== Personal life ==
Hordern was the elder brother of renowned Shakespearean actor Sir Michael Hordern.

A Royal Air Force officer, Hordern was awarded the Air Force Cross during World War II and reached the rank of Wing Commander.

== See also ==
- List of England national rugby union players
- List of British & Irish Lions players
