= William Glegg =

William Glegg was the founder of the Calday Grange Grammar School. A man of considerable local standing, he founded the school in 1636. He gave 15 acres (61,000 m^{2}) of land to provide an annual income of £12 per year for a schoolmaster. In the declaration he made when founding the school he wrote:

...how very Godly, necessary and virtuous it is to provide that youth should be and may be brought up in virtue, learning, and good order and obedience, whereby they may better know and serve God, and profit their country
...a free grammar school be by me founded and erected within the township of Calday Grange, near unto Hinderton, within mine own native country, to have continuance and endure for evermore...

The Foundation Charter dated 26 October 1636 states that "William Glegg of Calday Grange in the County of Chester, Armiger, for the honour of Almighty God and in the name of Jesus Christ, and also for the good and Christian Institution of boys within the village of Calday Grange gave certain lands for the purposes of a Free Grammar School which shall be founded and erected within the township of Calday Grange within the Parish of West Kirby in the County Palatine of Chester."

Named after him is the Calady Grange Grammar school house Glegg.

During the English Civil War, he was held prisoner in Chester, and exchanged for Sir Nicholas Byron. He had three sons in the Parliament service, one of whom, John Glegg, was killed in action in Ireland, while serving as Sergeant-Major to Colonel Michael Jones.
