= 1910 British Lions tour to Argentina =

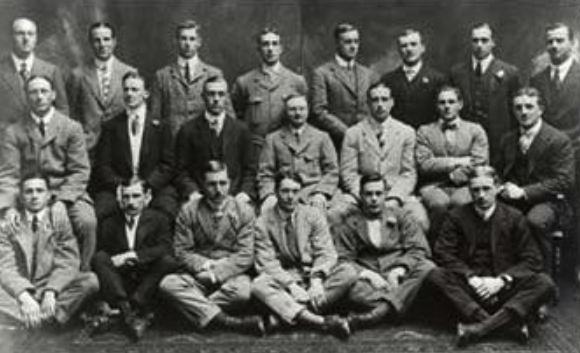
- The 1910 British Isles team
- Date: 26 May – 17 June
- Coach: R.V. Stanley
- Tour captain: (England) John Raphael
- Test series winners: British and Irish Lions (1–0)
- Top test point scorer: (England) Harold Monks (10)
Summary
P	W	D	L
Total
6	6	0	0
Test match
1	1	0	0
Opponent
P	W	D	L
Argentina
1	1	0	0

Tour chronology
- ← NZ & Australia 1908 South Africa 1910 →

The 1910 British Lions tour to Argentina was a rugby tour of Argentina made by a side made up of 16 English players and 3 Scots. The organisers of the tour named the team the "English Rugby Union team", but the host country advertised the touring team as the British Combined ("Combinado Británico" in Spanish). The 1910 team has been termed as one of the three "lost lions" tours, and is detailed on the British and Irish Lions official website. For Argentina, this tour marked the start of international rugby union and the test against the Combined British on 12 June 1910 was the first test in the Argentine national team's history.

== History ==
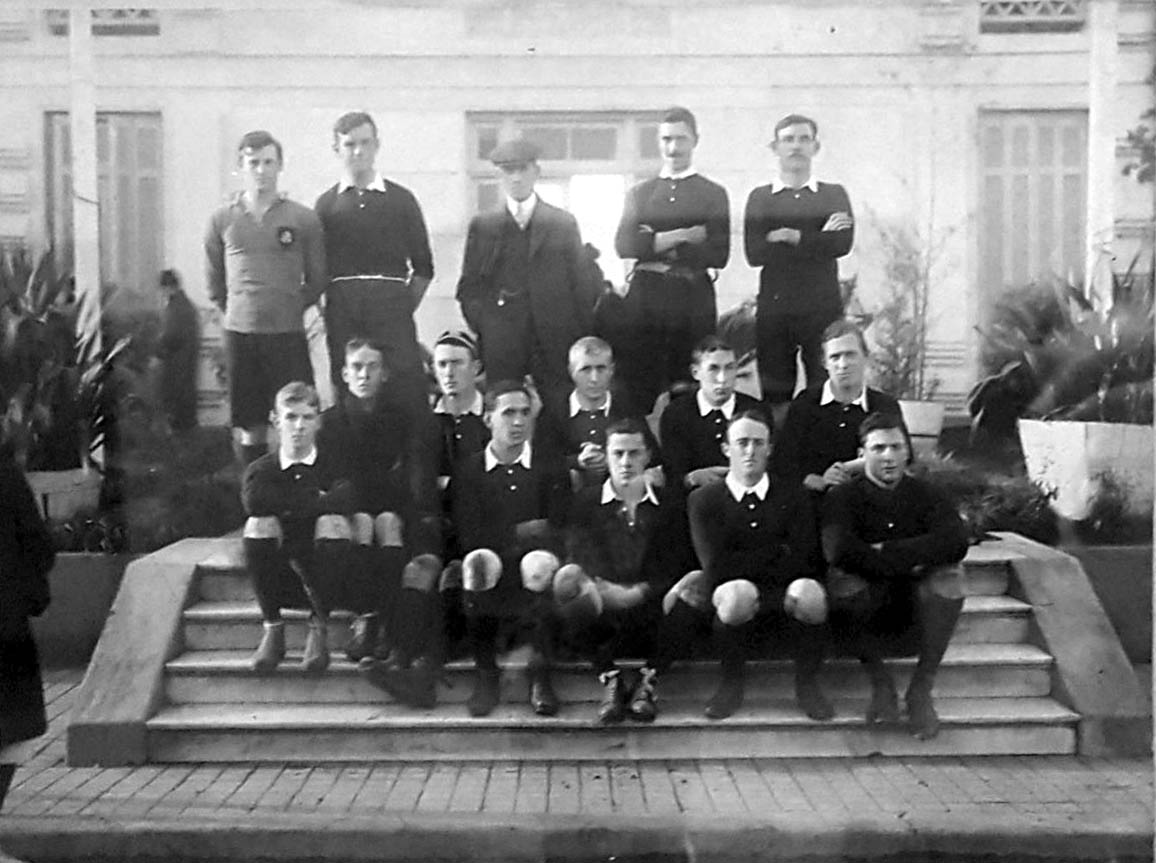
The first Argentina national team ever before playing the British Lions at Sociedad Sportiva Argentina, 12 June 1910

In 1910, a British side toured South Africa for the fourth time, being the eighth outing of a British touring side at this point. The South African tour was, however, the first official tour, in that it had the official sanction of the four home unions. Concurrently, RV Stanley, more famously known as Major Stanley of Oxford, later an England selector, organised a side to tour Argentina. John Raphael, the England fullback, was selected as the captain of this team, branded by Stanley as the England Rugby Union team. The hosts referred to the team as the Combined British, perhaps more appropriate given the squad included three Scots.

The tour was also part of the celebrations for the 100th anniversary of the May Revolution. The people of Argentina termed it the "Combined British", also known as "Great Britain XV". Argentina made its international debut against this team under the name "The River Plate Rugby Football Union" on 12 June. The match was played at Sociedad Sportiva Argentina of Palermo and Argentina lost 28–3. The only try for the Argentine squad (the first international try) was scored by Buenos Aires F.C. player Frank Heriot. (Note: Some sources cited C. McCarthy (player of Lomas A.C.) as the author of the first try instead Heriot.) . Argentina's most notable players were captain Oswald St. John Gebbie and Barry Heatlie, a South African who played for the Springboks.

The Combined British played six matches, winning them all, including a victory over Argentina in their first ever test on 12 June 1910.

== Team ==
Of those representing the Combined British, only four had played international rugby previously. They were:

- John Raphael, (Old Merchants Taylors', Oxford University, Surrey) played fullback for England (also a notable cricketer);
- Alex Palmer, (London Hospital, Harlequins) a New Zealander who played on the wing for England
- Barrie Bennetts, (Penzance RFC and Cornwall) played on the wing for England
- Anthony Henniker-Gotley, (Oxford University, Kent, Blackheath) played at halfback for England

Other members of the team were:

- Harold Gordon Monks (Liverpool Old Boys, Wigan RFC and Lancashire)
- Horace Evelyn Ward (Harlequins and Middlesex)
- E.S. Holmwood (Kent)
- William Lovat Fraser (Merchistonian FC)
- Edward Newman Fuller (Old Merchants Taylors', Cambridge University and Kent)
- John Francis Ashby (Cheshire)
- Robert Bertram Waddell (Glasgow Academicals RFC)
- Henry John Fraser
- Walter Legh Huntingford (United Services, Blackheath and Surrey)
- Robin Harrison (Northampton RFC, Midlands RFU and the South)
- Whalley Stranach (Guy's Hospital and Kent and English Trials)
- Stanley Herbert Smith (Cumberland)
- Martin Tweed (Guy's Hospital)
- Percy Robert Diggle (Oxford University and Cumberland)
- Peter Denny Strang (Old Merchants Taylors' and Surrey)
- Sidney Herbert Milnes (Manchester FC, Lancashire)
- Henry Whitehead (Manchester FC, Lancashire and North of England)

== Match summary ==
Complete list of matches played by the British Isles in Argentina:

Test matches

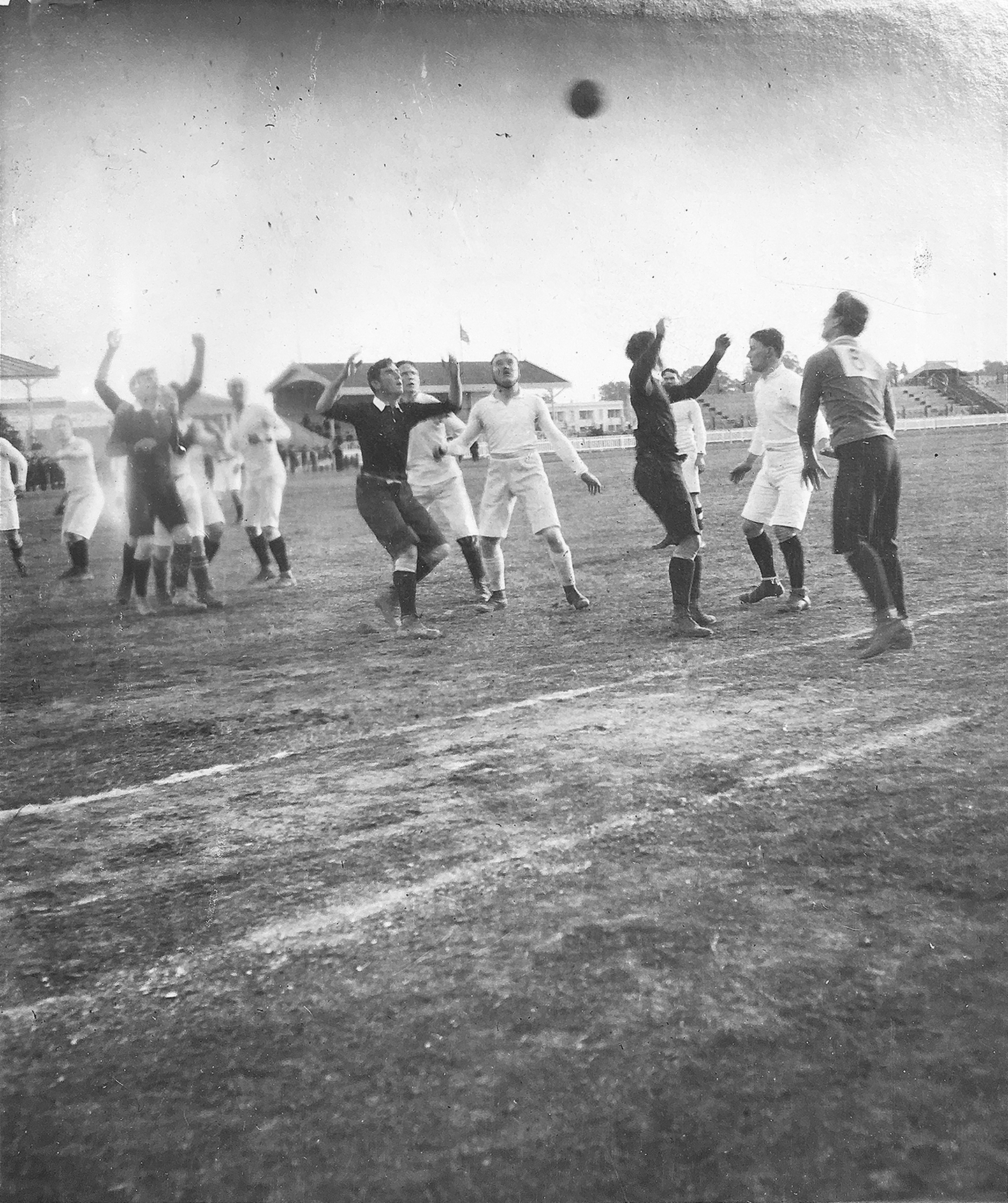
The English side (in white shirts) playing Argentina at Sociedad Sportiva on 12 June. It was the international debut of an Argentine rugby team

#	Date	Rival	City	Venue	Score
1	26 May	Olímpicos A (Note: Combined teams.)	Buenos Aires	n/a	19–13
2	29 May	Belgrano A.C.	Buenos Aires	n/a	58–0
3	2 Jun	Olímpicos B	Buenos Aires	n/a	39–5
4	6 Jun	Buenos Aires F.C.	Buenos Aires	Buenos Aires Cricket	28–0
5	12 Jun	Argentina (Note: The first international game played by Argentina, under the name "The River Plate Rugby Football Union")	Buenos Aires	Sociedad Sportiva	28–3
6	17 Jun	Argentinos Nativos (Note: At those times, most of rugby players in Argentina were of British origin. The most important match of each year was the played between "Nativos" (formed by Argentine born players) and "Británicos" (then "Extranjeros") (Foreigner). This tradition was abandoned in the 50s.)	Buenos Aires	n/a	41–10

Balance
Pl	W	D	L	Ps	Pc
6	6	0	0	211	31

== Test details ==
June 12, 1910

Argentina	3–28	(United Kingdom) British Isles
Try: MacCarthy

Sociedad Sportiva Argentina

Argentina	British Isles

Argentina: : J.E. Saffery, Cornelius MacCarthy, Oswald Gebbie, M. Heriot, Henry Talbot, W.A. Watson, Carlos Mold, Barry Heatlie, L.H. Gribbell, W.H. Hayman, F. Henrys, A. Bovet, A. Donelly, Alvan Reid
