= Harold Uren (footballer) =

English footballer (1885–1955)

Harold John Uren (23 August 1885 – 7 April 1955) was an English footballer who played as a midfielder for Liverpool in The Football League. Uren started his career in the reserves at Liverpool and progressed through the ranks to the first team as an amateur. He appeared sporadically during his first three seasons at the club making six appearances during that time, also making appearances at Wrexham at the end of the 1906–07 season. He was also part of Great Britain's gold medal-winning squad for the football tournament at the 1908 Summer Olympics, but he did not play in any matches.

Uren was born in Barton Regis, near Bristol on 23 August 1885.

Uren became a regular in the side in the 1911–12 season when he appeared 24 times and scored twice. He was sold during the season to Everton for £300 and two players. He would play there until 1913 before making a return to Wrexham. Two of Uren's sons, Dick and Harold, were rugby union players who both played international matches in the 1940s and 1950s.

Uren died on 7 April 1955 in West Kirby, aged 69.
