= 1931 Five Nations Championship =

Rugby union competition

- Date: 1 January - 6 April 1931
- Countries: England; France; Ireland; Scotland; Wales

Tournament statistics
- Champions: Wales (9th title)
- Matches played: 10

The 1931 Five Nations Championship was the seventeenth series of the rugby union Five Nations Championship following the inclusion of France into the Home Nations Championship. Including the previous Home Nations Championships, this was the forty-fourth series of the annual northern hemisphere rugby union championship. Ten matches were played between 1 January and 6 April. It was contested by England, France, Ireland, Scotland and Wales.

Shortly after the tournament, France was expelled from the competition amid allegations of professionalism in the domestic game (rugby union was officially an amateur sport until 1995) and perceived administrative deficiencies. France remained expelled until the 1947 competition after the Second World War. They were readmitted later in 1939, but the outbreak of World War II in Europe halted international rugby until 1947.

== Table ==
Pos	Team	Pld	W	D	L	PF	PA	PD	Pts
1	Wales	4	3	1	0	74	25	+49	7
2	Scotland	4	2	0	2	47	44	+3	4
2	Ireland	4	2	0	2	17	28	−11	4
2	France	4	2	0	2	24	54	−30	4
5	England	4	0	1	3	48	59	−11	1

== Results ==
1931-01-01

France	3–0	Ireland

Paris

1931-01-17

England	11–11	Wales

London

1931-01-24

Scotland	6–4	France

Edinburgh

1931-02-07

Wales	13–8	Scotland

Cardiff

1931-02-14

England	5–6	Ireland

London

1931-02-28

Wales	35–3	France

Swansea

1931-02-28

Ireland	8–5	Scotland

Dublin

1931-03-14

Ireland	3–15	Wales

Belfast

1931-03-21

Scotland	28–19	England

Edinburgh

1931-04-06

France	14–13	England

Paris
