= History of rugby union matches between the British & Irish Lions and other countries =

Since 1989, the British & Irish Lions have developed a regular 12-year cycle of tours visiting one of the following three Southern Hemisphere nations, in turn, every four years:

- New Zealand (previous 2017, next 2029)
- South Africa (previous 2021, next 2033)
- Australia (previous 2025, next 2037)

However the history of their tours is more variable and diverse than the current status quo might indicate. Prior to the Second World War the Lions routinely toured Argentina, tours of Australia and New Zealand were frequently carried out in the same trip, intervals between tours were sometimes as much as 14 years (1910–1924) and sometimes as little as one year (1903, 1904) or even in the same year (1910 South Africa and Argentina). Additionally, whilst making tours the Lions would frequently play other neighbouring nations or teams in countries where the ship pulled into port or where the aircraft landed en route.

The Lions have also played several one-off matches when not on tour; these have all taken place in the United Kingdom with the exception of one match played in France.

The Lions have not always awarded caps for these matches, depending on whether it was felt by the team management that the opposition merited full-international status.

== Matches in minor rugby playing nations ==
The Lions played Rhodesia (a territory which, at different times in history comprised one or more of the modern day countries of Malawi, Zambia and Zimbabwe), South-West Africa (now Namibia) and East Africa (a British colony composed of Kenya, Tanzania/Tanganyika and Uganda) on some of their earlier South African tours. While travelling to or from Australia, New Zealand or Argentina, the Lions also played matches against teams in Canada, Ceylon (now Sri Lanka) and Fiji.

British Lions matches outside the major tour receiving nations
	Date	Year	Venue	City	Result
1	30 July	1910		Bulawayo	Rhodesia 11–24 British Lions
2	24 July	1924		Salisbury	Rhodesia 3–16 British Lions
5	1 October	1930	The Racecourse	Colombo	Ceylon 0–45 British Lions
3	20 July	1938		Salisbury	Rhodesia 11–25 British Lions
4	23 July	1938		Bulawayo	Rhodesia 11–45 British Lions
5	18 September	1950	The Racecourse	Colombo	Ceylon 6–44 British Lions
6	5 July	1955		Windhoek	(South Africa) South-West Africa 0–9 British Lions
7	27 July	1955	Rhokana Ground	Kitwe	(Federation of Rhodesia and Nyasaland) Rhodesia 14–27 British Lions
8	30 July	1955	Police Ground	Salisbury	(Federation of Rhodesia and Nyasaland) Rhodesia 12–16 British Lions
9	7 January	1955	RFUEA Ground	Nairobi	East Africa 12–39 British Lions
10	7 January	1959			British Columbia 11–16 British Lions
11	28 August	1959			Eastern Canada 6–70 British Lions
12	26 May	1962	Hartsfield Ground	Bulawayo	(Federation of Rhodesia and Nyasaland) Rhodesia 9–38 British Lions
13	12 June	1962	South West Stadium	Windhoek	(South Africa) South-West Africa 6–14 British Lions
14	28 August	1962	RFUEA Ground	Nairobi	East Africa 0–50 British Lions
15	14 September	1966	Empire Stadium	Vancouver	British Columbia 8–3 British Lions
16	17 September	1966			Canada 8–19 British Lions
17	3 June	1968	Police Ground	Salisbury	Rhodesia 6–32 British Lions
18	12 June	1968	South West Stadium	Windhoek	(South Africa) South-West Africa 0–23 British Lions
19	18 May	1974	South West Stadium	Windhoek	(South Africa) South-West Africa 16–23 British Lions
20	18 June	1974	Police Ground	Salisbury	Rhodesia 6–42 British Lions
21	16 August	1977	Buckhurst Park	Suva	Fiji 25–21 British Lions
22	4 June	1980	South West Stadium	Windhoek	(South Africa) South African Country XV 7–27 British Lions

=== Canada ===
One of the most famous matches in Canadian rugby history became known as the "victory for the ages"; it was British Columbia's defeat of the 1966 British Lions

14 September 1966

British Columbia	8–3	British Lions
Try: Peter Grantham (1); Con: Don Burgess (1); Pen: Don Burgess (1); Drop: None		Try: Dewi Bebb (1); Con: None; Pen: None; Drop: None

Empire Stadium, Vancouver, Canada.
Attendance: 7,000
Referee: Dunbar, J

Teams

FB	15	Don Burgess
RW	14	Brian McKee
OC	13	Tom Brown
IC	12	Tim Cummings
LW	11	Jim Ryan
FH	10	Ted Hunt (c)
SH	9	Ross McDonald
LP	1	Bill Taylor
HK	2	Garry Fumano
TP	3	Peter Grantham
LL	4	Dave Milne
RL	5	Dick Layzell
OF	6	Chuck Pentland
BF	7	Mike Chambers
N8	8	Al Bianco

FB	15	(England) Stewart Wilson
RW	14	(Scotland) Sandy Hinshelwood
OC	13	(Scotland) Colin McFadyean
IC	12	(Wales) Barrie Bresnihan
LW	11	(Wales) Dewi Bebb
FH	10	(Wales) Dai Watkins
SH	9	(England) Roger Young
LP	1	(Wales) Denzil Williams
HK	2	(Scotland) Frank Laidlaw
TP	3	(Scotland) Ray McLoughlin
LL	4	(Scotland) Mike Campbell-Lamerton (c)
RL	5	(Wales) Brian Price
BF	6	(Wales) Howard Norris
OF	7	(Wales) Gary Prothero
N8	8	(Ireland) Willie John McBride

see:
1959 British Lions tour to Australia and New Zealand
1966 British Lions tour to Australia and New Zealand

=== Ceylon ===
On the return journey to the UK, the Lions stopped off in Ceylon (now Sri Lanka) to play the final tour match of the 1930 British Lions tour to New Zealand and Australia and the 1950 British Lions tour to New Zealand and Australia. The games were played on 1 October 1930 and 18 September 1950, both at the Racecourse in Colombo. The 1930 game was won 45–0. The 1950 local team was composed of executive staff from British companies, British armed forces and three local players: Summa Navaratnam, Leslie Ephraims and Clair Roeloffsz. The Lions won 44–6. This was to be the last Lions match played by the great Irish outside-half, Jack Kyle.
see:
1930 British Lions tour to New Zealand and Australia
1950 British Lions tour to New Zealand and Australia

=== East Africa ===
When the British Lions went to South Africa for their 1955 and 1962 tours, they played East Africa in Nairobi on the return legs of their journeys. The Lions won both of these games, 39–12 and 50–0 respectively. The 1955 game was East Africa's first international and also saw the official opening of the team's home stadium, the RFUEA Ground, then called the Ngong Road Ground.
see:
1955 British Lions tour to South Africa
1962 British Lions tour to South Africa

=== Fiji ===
On 16 August 1977, Fiji played their 88th test match and first against the British Lions. An examination of Fiji's results in the 1950s, 1960s and 1970s demonstrates that they were far more proficient at the 15-man game than they are today. A hard-fought game saw the lead change four times with no side getting more than seven points ahead at any time. Fiji scored five tries to the Lions' three and finished worthy winners. The Lions made one replacement during the match, Gordon Brown going on for Trevor Evans. Fiji picked six replacements but used none.

16 August 1977

Fiji	25–21	British Lions
Try: Narisia (2); Rauto; Kuinikoro; Racika; Con: Rauto; Drop: Tikoisuva		Try: Bennett; Beaumont; Burcher; Con: Bennett (3); Pen: Bennett

Buckhurst Park, Suva, Fiji
Referee: Sefanaia Koroi
Touch judge: R Jepson
Touch judge: J Peck

Fiji: (15) Kemueli Musunamasi; (14) Joape Kuinikoro; (13) Senitiki Nasave; (12) Qele Ratu; (11) Wame Gavidi; (10) Pio Tikoisuva (captain); (9) Samisoni Viriviri; (8) Viliame Ratudradra; (7) Vuata Narisia; (6) Rupeni Qaraniqio; (5) Ilisoni Taoba; (4) Ilaitia Tuisese; (3) Nimilote Ratudina; (2) Atonio Racika; (1) Josefa Rauto
Replacements: Livai Volavola; Isimeli Batibasaga; Isikeli Cagilaba; Lepani Tagicakibau; Luke Nabaro; Apenisa Tokairavua
British Lions: (15) Andy Irvine (Scotland); (14) Gareth Evans (Wales); (13) Ian McGeechan (Scotland); (12) David Burcher (Wales); (11) Phil Bennett (captain) (Wales); (10) John Bevan (Wales); (9) Alun Lewis (uncapped); (8) Jefferey Squire (Wales); (7) Trevor Evans (Wales); (6) Tony Neary (England); (5) Allan Martin (Wales); (4) Bill Beaumont (England); (3) Graham Price (Wales); (2) Bobby Windsor (Wales); (1) Charlie Faulkner (Wales)
Replacements: Gordon Brown(Scotland)
see:
1977 British Lions tour to New Zealand

=== Rhodesia ===
A regular feature of Lions tours to South Africa between 1910 and 1974 were matches played against Rhodesia, though during this period of history in Southern Africa the designation of Rhodesia is not straightforward. At its simplest it can be regarded as the territories that today comprise Zambia and Zimbabwe. These territories in no way can be regarded as a single entity, let alone a country. It is also not apparent if players selected to play for Rhodesia were drawn from one, two or all three of these territories or even (for the period between 1953 and 1963) if any players came from modern day Malawi.

In 1910 when the Lions first visited, Barotziland-North-Western Rhodesia and North-Eastern Rhodesia were two independent territories (administered by the British South Africa Company that together essentially made up the modern day country of Zambia) and Southern Rhodesia was a British colony that is now Zimbabwe.

By the time of the 1924 and 1938 Lions tours, North-Western and North-Eastern Rhodesia had been merged to form the protectorate of Northern Rhodesia; the colony of Southern Rhodesia still existed.

For the 1955 and 1962 tours, these two territories had been combined and, along with modern-day Malawi, made up the Federation of Rhodesia and Nyasaland.

In 1964 Northern Rhodesia and Nyasaland were granted independence and became Zambia and Malawi respectively. Southern Rhodesia remained a colony and called itself Rhodesia (between 1964 and 1979) and Zimbabwe Rhodesia (in 1979), though this name was not accepted by the British government who, until the independence of Zimbabwe in 1980, continued to call the territory Southern Rhodesia.
see:
1910 British Lions tour to South Africa
1924 British Lions tour to South Africa
1938 British Lions tour to South Africa
1955 British Lions tour to South Africa
1962 British Lions tour to South Africa
1968 British Lions tour to South Africa
1974 British Lions tour to South Africa

=== South West Africa ===
As for Rhodesia above, the designation of South West Africa is not simple but for different reasons. The area of land has always been essentially the territory that makes up modern day Namibia; but its legal status was far from clear. As with South Africa, it was essentially under an apartheid regime.

South West Africa was a German colony (German South West Africa) from 1884, several small parts were annexed by Britain and added to the Cape Colony which itself was combined with Colony of Natal, Transvaal Colony and the Orange River Colony to become the Commonwealth realm of the Union of South Africa in 1910. After World War I South-West Africa was declared a League of Nations Mandate to be administered by South Africa and after World War II it was supposed to become a United Nations Trust Territory, but South Africa objected and refused to allow it to achieve independence. South Africa's position was supported by the International Court of Justice which required, however, that South Africa follow the previously applied League of Nations Mandate.

Thus for the 1955 and 1962 Lions tours South West Africa was being regarded and administered as a fifth province of South Africa though it was never officially incorporated into the Commonwealth realm.

In 1966 the United Nations General Assembly declared the League of Nations Mandate terminated and required that South Africa withdraw from Namibia immediately. There followed a protracted struggle for independence by the South West Africa People's Organisation (SWAPO) with the territory finally achieving independence as the Republic of Namibia in 1990. As a result, when the Lions played South-West Africa in 1968, 1974 and 1980 they were technically playing an independent nation that should have been called Namibia, but a nation that was yet to come into existence.
see:
1955 British Lions tour to South Africa
1962 British Lions tour to South Africa
1968 British Lions tour to South Africa
1974 British Lions tour to South Africa
1980 British Lions tour to South Africa

== One-off matches (not part of a tour) ==
The British & Irish Lions have made three official non-tour appearances, all of which have been on home soil. Teams styled as "the Lions" have turned out on three additional occasions, two on home soil and one in France. Four of these matches have been played in Cardiff (three at the Arms Park and one in the Millennium Stadium), one in London (at Twickenham), one in Edinburgh (at Murrayfield), one in Dublin (at the Dublin Arena) and one in Paris (at the Parc des Princes).

One other match, The Skilball Trophy match has been played by a Four Home Unions side against The Rest of Europe to raise money in aid of the rebuilding of Romania following the overthrow of Nicolae Ceaușescu. It was played at Twickenham on 22 April 1990, the home side wore the Lions badge on their shirts but were not officially a British Lions side.

Lions matches in Europe
No.	Date	Venue	City	Result
1	22 September 1951	Cardiff Arms Park	Cardiff	British Lions 14–12 Cardiff RFC
2	22 October 1955	Cardiff Arms Park	Cardiff	British Lions 20–17 Wales
3	10 September 1977	Twickenham Stadium	London	British Lions 23–14 Barbarians
4	16 April 1986	Cardiff Arms Park	Cardiff	British Lions 15–7 Rest of the World
5	4 October 1989	Parc des Princes	Paris	France 27–29 British Lions
6	23 May 2005	Millennium Stadium	Cardiff	British & Irish Lions 25–25 Argentina
7	26 June 2021	Murrayfield Stadium	Edinburgh	British & Irish Lions 28–10 Japan
8	20 June 2025	Dublin Arena	Dublin	British & Irish Lions 24–28 Argentina

=== Cardiff RFC ===
The first match of a British Lions team played not while on tour took place on 22 September 1951 at Cardiff Arms Park against the Cardiff club side. The match is sometimes listed as the last game of the Lions 1950 tour, though this was technically not a true Lions team. It may have been difficult to pick a full Lions side however as five members of that Lions touring party played for Cardiff; Billy Cleaver, Jack Matthews, Bleddyn Williams, Rex Willis and Cliff Davies. The match, which was staged to celebrate Cardiff's 75th Anniversary, was won by the Lions 14–12.

=== Wales ===
The second Lions match at home, though sometimes listed as the last match of the 1955 British Lions tour to South Africa was also not technically a true British Lions match; it was not officially sanctioned by the team and did not include all the big names of that tour, such as Tony O'Reilly, Jeff Butterfield, Phil Davies, Dickie Jeeps, Bryn Meredith and Jim Greenwood. This match too was played at the Cardiff Arms Park, then the Welsh national stadium, against a Welsh XV on 22 October 1955. This match was staged to mark the 75th anniversary of the Welsh Rugby Union, the Lions won 20–17.
see:
1955 (vs Wales XV)

=== Barbarians ===
The first officially sanctioned home match was a charity fund-raiser held as part of the Queen's silver jubilee celebrations; it was played at Twickenham on 10 September 1977 against the Barbarians. The Lions were at full tour party strength and the Barbarian side included J. P. R. Williams, Gerald Davies, Gareth Edwards, Jean-Pierre Rives and Jean-Claude Skrela. The match nearly did not take place, the players threatened to boycott the match when their wives and partners were initially not invited to attend. The Lions won 23–14. A second meeting between the sides took place in Hong Kong on 1 June 2013 before the Lions embarked on their tour of Australia, The Lions won the match 59–8.
see:
1977 (vs Barbarians)

=== "The Rest" ===
On 16 April 1986, the second officially sanctioned Lions home match was played against "The Rest" (meaning the other member countries of the International Rugby Board) at Cardiff Arms Park. This was a warm-up match played both to prepare the side for the impending tour to South Africa and also as a celebration match to mark the International Board's centenary. It turned out to be the only match played by this Lions side; the tour had already been called off by the hosts under political pressure due to the apartheid regime that still existed in South Africa. The Lions won the match 15–7.
see:
British Lions v The Rest

=== France ===
On 4 October 1989, a Lions team played a match at the Parc des Princes against France. The Lions were made up mostly of players form the recently completed tour to Australia. The match formed part of the bicentennial celebrations of the French Revolution. France lost the match 29–27.
see:
1989 (vs France)

=== Argentina ===
On 23 May 2005, the Lions played their first sanctioned home match of the 2000s, almost 16 years after the previous such fixture, against Argentina at the Millennium Stadium in Cardiff. Although six test matches have been played against Argentina on three tours (one in 1910, four in 1927 and one in 1936), they have only faced the Lions this one time on foreign soil. The match was designed to be a warm-up match for the impending tour to New Zealand. The Pumas were underdogs going into the match, never having won a match in their 95-year history of playing the Lions. However, they played a scintillating game and were only denied victory by a Jonny Wilkinson penalty seven minutes after the end of regulation time. The final result was a 25–25 draw.
see:
2005 (vs Argentina)

Twenty years later, the Lions faced Argentina again on 20 June 2025, in preparation for the tour to Australia. It also marked the first time in history that the Lions had played in Dublin. Argentina achieved their first ever victory over the Lions, edging the match by 28–24.
see:
2025 (vs Argentina)

=== Japan ===
On 26 June 2021, the Lions played against Japan at Murrayfield in Edinburgh, to serve as a warm-up for that year's tour of South Africa. The Lions won the match by a score of 28–10.

== Bibliography ==
- Campbell, M.; Cohen, E. J. (1960). Rugby Football in East Africa 1909–1959. Rugby Football Union of East Africa.
- Godwin, Terry; Rhys, Chris (1981). The Guinness Book of Rugby Facts & Feats. Enfield: Guinness Superlatives. ISBN 0-85112-214-0.
- Smith, David; Williams, Gareth (1980). Fields of Praise: The Official History of The Welsh Rugby Union. Cardiff: University of Wales Press. ISBN 0-7083-0766-3.
- Starmer-Smith, Nigel (1977). The Barbarians. Macdonald & Jane's Publishers. ISBN 0-86007-552-4.
- Thomas, Clem; Thomas, Greg (2001). The History of The British and Irish Lions. Mainstream Books. pp. 100–117. ISBN 1-84018-498-1.
