= Dickie Lloyd =

Irish rugby union player and cricketer (1891–1950)

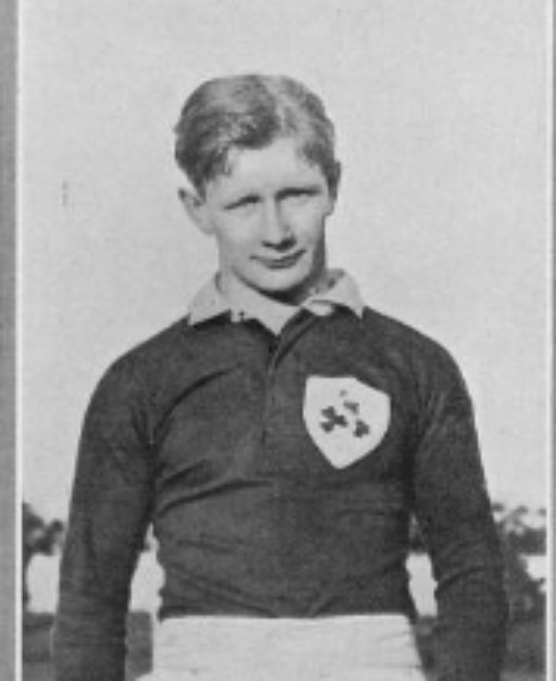
- Lloyd in Irish rugby kit

Cricket information
- Batting: Right-handed
- Bowling: Right-arm medium

International information
- National side: Ireland

Career statistics
Competition	First-class
Matches	6
Runs scored	202
Batting average	20.20
100s/50s	0/1
Top score	51
Catches/stumpings	5/–
- Source: CricketArchive, 16 November 2022

Richard Averill Lloyd (4 August 1891 – 23 December 1950) was an Irish cricketer and rugby union player. At cricket, he was a right-handed batsman and right-arm medium pace bowler who played two first-class matches for the Ireland cricket team, also playing for Lancashire. In rugby union, he was a fly-half who played 19 times for the Ireland national rugby union team, scoring 72 points, and was regarded as one of the best goal-kickers of his time. He is regarded by his school, Portora Royal School, as one of their most famous pupils, alongside Samuel Beckett and Oscar Wilde.

== Cricket career ==
His cricket career began at Dublin University, and he made his Ireland debut while there, playing against Scotland in July 1911. He played his second and final match for Ireland against South Africa a year later. In 1914, he played one first-class match for the Free Foresters, against Cambridge University.

Later, he played three first-class matches for Lancashire: a County Championship match against Gloucestershire, a match against Australia in 1921, and a match against Cambridge University in 1922. CricketArchive records him as having played for Denbighshire in Minor Counties cricket in the 1930s, though some research suggests that this is a different RA Lloyd, as the RA Lloyd who played for Denbighshire apparently looked nothing like a rugby player and did not sound Irish.

=== Cricket statistics ===
In his two matches for Ireland, he scored 96 runs at an average of 32, with a top score of 47 against Scotland in his first match. In first-class cricket, he scored 202 runs at an average of 20.2, with a top score of 51 for Lancashire against Gloucestershire, his only half-century. He appears to have not bowled after leaving school, playing as wicket-keeper in one of his Lancashire matches.

== Rugby union career ==
Lloyd reached high level in schools' rugby in Ireland, representing the Ulster Schools XV. His team at Portora Royal School, where he was a key player, was considered by an Irish rugby historian to be "the greatest school side in the history of the game", beating adult sides on more than one occasion.

He made his debut for the Ireland rugby union team in 1910 while still a student, playing against England and Scotland in the Five Nations. He played in all of Ireland's matches in the following year's tournament, repeating that run in 1912 and 1913. He also played a match against South Africa in November 1912. He played just twice in the 1914 Five Nations, against England and France, returning after the war to play twice in the 1920 tournament, again against England and France. He was later an international referee.

=== Rugby union statistics ===
In his 19 matches for Ireland, he scored two tries, 16 conversions, seven drop goals and three penalties, for a total of 72 points under the current point scoring system, which was different when Lloyd played.

== See also ==
- List of Irish cricket and rugby union players

Sporting positions
Preceded by George Hamlet; Alexander Foster; Alexander Foster; Thomas Wallace	Ireland Rugby Union Captain; Jan 1912; Feb 1912 – Feb 1914; Feb 1920; Apr 1920	Succeeded by Alexander Foster; Alexander Foster; George Doherty; George Doherty
