= William Ashby =

William Ashby may refer to:

- William Ashby (cricketer) (1786–1847), English cricketer
- W. Ross Ashby (1903–1972), English psychiatrist and cyberneticist
- William Ashby (died 1543), MP for Leicestershire
- William Ashby (died 1593), MP for Chichester and Grantham, and ambassador in Scotland
- William Ashby, character in The Witch of Blackbird Pond
- Bill Ashby, coach at Maine Sting
- William Joseph Ashby (1885–1953), Irish rugby union player
