= History of rugby union matches between South Africa and the British & Irish Lions =

In rugby union, since their first meeting in 1891, the British & Irish Lions and the South Africa national team have contested 13 series, with South Africa winning nine to the Lions' four, and one drawn series in 1955. The two teams have played 49 matches; South Africa have won 25 times to the Lions' 18, with the remaining six matches finishing as draws. The Lions won the first two series between the two sides in 1891 and 1896, including wins in the first six matches, but then did not win another series until their unbeaten 1974 tour. After South Africa's victory in the 1980 series, the two teams did not meet again until 1997 as a result of apartheid sanctions; the Lions won the 1997 series, before South Africa won the next two tours; 2009 and 2021.

== List of series ==
Details	Played	Won by South Africa	Won by Lions	Draw
Overall	14	9	4	1

Series	South Africa wins	Lions wins	Victor
1891	0	3	British Lions
1896	1	3	British Lions
1903	1	0	South Africa
1910	2	1	South Africa
1924	3	0	South Africa
1938	2	1	South Africa
1955	2	2	drawn
1962	3	0	South Africa
1968	3	0	South Africa
1974	0	3	British Lions
1980	3	1	South Africa
1997	1	2	British Lions
2009	2	1	South Africa
2021	2	1	South Africa

== List of matches ==
Details	Played	Won by South Africa	Won by Lions	Drawn	South Africa points	British & Irish Lions points
Overall	49	25	18	6	636	554

Date	Venue	Score	Victor	Series
30 July 1891	Crusader's Ground, Port Elizabeth	0–4	(United Kingdom) British Lions	1891 tour
29 August 1891	Eclectic Cricket Ground, Kimberley	0–3	(United Kingdom) British Lions	1891 tour
5 September 1891	Newlands, Cape Town	0–4	(United Kingdom) British Lions	1891 tour
30 July 1896	Crusader's Ground, Port Elizabeth	0–8	(United Kingdom) British Lions	1896 tour
22 August 1896	Wanderers Stadium, Johannesburg	8–17	(United Kingdom) British Lions	1896 tour
29 August 1896	Athletic Club, Kimberley	3–9	(United Kingdom) British Lions	1896 tour
5 September 1896	Newlands, Cape Town	5–0	South Africa	1896 tour
26 August 1903	Wanderers Stadium, Johannesburg	10–10	Draw	1903 tour
5 September 1903	Athletic Club, Kimberley	0–0	Draw	1903 tour
12 September 1903	Newlands, Cape Town	8–0	South Africa	1903 tour
6 August 1910	Wanderers Stadium, Johannesburg	14–10	South Africa	1910 tour
27 August 1910	Crusader's Ground, Port Elizabeth	3–8	(United Kingdom) British Lions	1910 tour
3 September 1910	Newlands, Cape Town	21–5	South Africa	1910 tour
16 August 1924	Kingsmead, Durban	7–3	South Africa	1924 tour
23 August 1924	Wanderers Stadium, Johannesburg	17–0	South Africa	1924 tour
13 September 1924	Crusader's Ground, Port Elizabeth	3–3	Draw	1924 tour
20 September 1924	Newlands, Cape Town	16–9	South Africa	1924 tour
6 August 1938	Ellis Park, Johannesburg	26–12	South Africa	1938 tour
3 September 1938	Crusader's Ground, Port Elizabeth	19–3	South Africa	1938 tour
10 September 1938	Newlands, Cape Town	16–21	British Lions	1938 tour
6 August 1955	Ellis Park, Johannesburg	22–23	British Lions	1955 tour
20 August 1955	Newlands, Cape Town	25–9	South Africa	1955 tour
3 September 1955	Loftus Versfeld, Pretoria	6–9	British Lions	1955 tour
24 September 1955	Crusader's Ground, Port Elizabeth	22–8	South Africa	1955 tour
23 June 1962	Ellis Park, Johannesburg	3–3	Draw	1962 tour
21 July 1962	Kings Park, Durban	3–0	South Africa	1962 tour
4 August 1962	Newlands, Cape Town	8–3	South Africa	1962 tour
25 August 1962	Free State Stadium, Bloemfontein	34–14	South Africa	1962 tour
8 June 1968	Loftus Versfeld, Pretoria	25–20	South Africa	1968 tour
22 June 1968	EPRFU Stadium, Port Elizabeth	6–6	Draw	1968 tour
13 July 1968	Newlands, Cape Town	11–6	South Africa	1968 tour
27 July 1968	Ellis Park, Johannesburg	19–6	South Africa	1968 tour
8 June 1974	Newlands, Cape Town	3–12	British Lions	1974 tour
22 June 1974	Loftus Versfeld, Pretoria	9–28	British Lions	1974 tour
13 July 1974	EPRFU Stadium, Port Elizabeth	9–26	British Lions	1974 tour
27 July 1974	Ellis Park, Johannesburg	13–13	Draw	1974 tour
31 May 1980	Newlands, Cape Town	26–22	South Africa	1980 tour
14 June 1980	Free State Stadium, Bloemfontein	26–19	South Africa	1980 tour
28 June 1980	EPRFU Stadium, Port Elizabeth	12–10	South Africa	1980 tour
12 July 1980	Loftus Versfeld, Pretoria	13–17	British Lions	1980 tour
21 June 1997	Newlands, Cape Town	16–25	British Lions	1997 tour
28 June 1997	Kings Park, Durban	15–18	British Lions	1997 tour
5 July 1997	Ellis Park, Johannesburg	35–16	South Africa	1997 tour
20 June 2009	Kings Park, Durban	26–21	South Africa	2009 tour
27 June 2009	Loftus Versfeld, Pretoria	28–25	South Africa	2009 tour
4 July 2009	Ellis Park, Johannesburg	9–28	British & Irish Lions	2009 tour
24 July 2021	Cape Town Stadium, Cape Town	17–22	British & Irish Lions	2021 tour
31 July 2021	Cape Town Stadium, Cape Town	27–9	South Africa	2021 tour
7 August 2021	Cape Town Stadium, Cape Town	19–16	South Africa	2021 tour
