= Edward Crean =

British Lions international rugby union player

- Born: Edward O'Donovan Crean; 16 July 1887 Liverpool, Lancashire, England
- Died: 24 December 1940 Liverpool
- School: Ampleforth Abbey and College

Rugby union career
- Position: Forward
Senior career
Years	Team	Apps	(Points)
- Liverpool Football Club
International career
Years	Team	Apps	(Points)
1910	British Isles	tour	

Edward O'Donovan Crean (16 July 1887 – 24 December 1940) was an English rugby union player who was part of the first official British & Irish Lions team that toured South Africa in 1910. He is one of a small number of Lions players to have never played for their national side.

== Early life ==
Edward O'Donovan Crean was born on 16 July, 1887 in Liverpool, the son of the oil refiner James Crean (b 1853) and Catherine O'Halloran. Although both his parents were also born in Liverpool, all of Crean's grandparents were Irish. He had a number of older siblings. Edward Crean attended and boarded at the catholic Ampleforth Abbey and College.

== Rugby career ==
Crean played for Liverpool Football Club, a rugby club, which later became Liverpool and St Helens RFC, and is not to be confused with its association football equivalent. He played in the Oxford University clash in the 1908/09 season and played alongside the two Irish internationals, G. Pinion and M.G. Garry. He also saw the beginnings of potentially the greatest side of Liverpool that contained three international captains (Poulton-Palmer of England, Lloyd of Ireland and Turner of Scotland).

Despite having not been selected for the England team, in 1910 Crean was selected for the first official British tour to South Africa (in that it was sanctioned and selected by the four Home Nations official governing bodies).

== First World War ==
In the First World War Crean joined the Royal Naval Air Service, which by the end of the war had merged with the Royal Flying Corps to become the Royal Air Force. By the end of the war he had risen to the rank of captain, and was elected to the Royal Aero Club of the UK on 19 June 1919.

== Later life ==
Edward O’Donovan Crean died on 24 December 1940 in Liverpool.
