= Maurice Neale =

British Lions & England international rugby union player

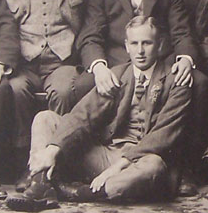
- Born: Maurice Edward Neale; 1886 Berkeley, Gloucestershire, England
- Died: 9 July 1967 (aged 80–81) Bristol, England

Rugby union career
- Position(s): Centre, Wing
Senior career
Years	Team	Apps	(Points)
1907-1911	Bristol		
1912-	Blackheath F.C.		
–	Barbarian F.C.		
–	Gloucestershire		
International career
Years	Team	Apps	(Points)
1910	British Isles	3	(3)
1912	England	1	(0)

Maurice Edward Neale (1886 – 9 July 1967) was an English rugby union international who played on a single occasion for his country and was part of the first official British Isles team that toured South Africa in 1910, finishing top try scorer of the series.

== Career history ==
Neale was born in Berkeley, England in 1886 later moving to Thornbury. In 1907 Neale, who was at the time playing club rugby for Bristol, played at county level for Gloucestershire. In 1908 he was again selected for Gloucestershire, this time to face the 1908 touring Australian team. Neale, was selected at wing for the match, but was forced to leave the field with a shoulder injury. Gloucestershire lost the game 16–0. Neale had a long career at county level and was part of the Gloucestershire team who won the 1909-1910 County Championship.

In 1910, despite not being capped at international level or even been offered a trial, he was selected for the British Isles team on their 1910 tour of South Africa. Neale played in 14 matches of the tour including all three Test matches, and finished as the team's leading try scorer with a total of ten. In the match against Border, in the run up to the second Test, Neale scored a hat-trick of tries in a 30–10 win. In the second Test against South Africa, Neale was placed on the wing, from where he scored the winning try that levelled the series. A popular member of the tour, Neale impressed the South African crowds with his blistering speed off the mark and his accurate cross kick.

In 1911 he played in his first English trial, and was later selected for invitational touring side the Barbarians. In the 1911 Barbarian game against Leicester, Neale scored all the points for the tourists when he scored two tries in a 6–13 loss. Before his selection into the England squad he switched teams from Bristol to Blackheath. Neale's first and only England cap was in the 1912 Five Nations Championship victory over France in Paris.
