= Noel Forbes Humphreys =

British Lions international rugby union player (1890–1918)

- Born: Noel Forbes Humphreys; 1 December 1890 Llangan Rectory, Bridgend, Glamorgan
- Died: 27 March 1918 (aged 27)
- Height: 5 ft 5 in (165 cm)
- School: St Chad's College, Denstone; Durham School

Rugby union career
- Position: fly-half (stand-off)
Amateur team(s)
Years	Team	Apps	(Points)
- Tynedale
International career
Years	Team	Apps	(Points)
1910	British Isles	tour	(0)

Noel Forbes Humphreys (1 December 1890 – 27 March 1918) was a Welsh rugby union international who was part of the first official British and Irish Lions team that toured South Africa in 1910. He was killed in action in the First World War.

== Early life ==
Noel Forbes Humphreys was born in 1891 in Llangan Rectory, Bridgend, Wales. He was the son of Henry James Humphreys and Sydney (née Williams) and one of at least six children. His family moved from Wales to northern England as his father's profession within the Church dictated. By the time Humphreys began playing rugby at club level the family had passed through Cheshire and had settled at Thornley Vicarage, Tow Law, Co. Durham. He attended St Chad's College, Denstone and went on to Durham School.

== Rugby career ==
Humphreys played for Tynedale R.F.C. in what has been termed their Golden Years. During the decade up to the outbreak of the First World War Tynedale won no fewer than 15 trophies, including the Senior Cup on three occasions and the Senior Shield four times in a row between 1909 and 1912. It was a run of success which, during this period, saw a score of Tynedale players being honoured by selection for their respective counties. Humphreys was part of the side in that period, playing in the stand-off (or fly-half) position It was during this period that Humphreys was selected for the 1910 British tour to South Africa, the first official tour of the British Isles team (in that it was sanctioned and selected by the four Home Nations official governing bodies). Despite playing for the British team, he was never selected for his national side.

== First World War ==
Humphreys fought in the First World War as a captain in the Tank Corps (10th Battalion). He was Mentioned in Despatches and was also awarded the Military Cross. He was killed in action on 27 March 1918 and is commemorated at Etaples Military Cemetery.
