= Walter E. Rees =

Welsh rugby union administrator

- Born: 13 April 1863; Neath, Wales
- Died: 6 June 1949 (aged 86); Bridgend, Wales
- Occupation: Sports official
- Known for: Secretary of the WRU

Captain Walter Enoch Rees (13 April 1863 – 6 June 1949) was a Welsh rugby union administrator who was the longest serving secretary of the Welsh Rugby Union and joint manager of the 1910 British Lions tour of South Africa.

== Career as rugby administrator ==
Rees was born in 1863 in Neath, the son of Joseph Cook Rees, a builder and contractor. Rees was educated in his home town and later in Barnstable, and on leaving school followed his father into the local building trade. In 1888, Rees began his long association with rugby when he was appointed as secretary of Neath Rugby Football Club, a position he would hold until 1894, when he was made the club's treasurer. In 1889 he was elected to the Match Committee of the Welsh Football Union, later to be renamed the Welsh Rugby Union, along with Horace Lyne. In a hostile meeting of the WRU in 1891, several members of the board attempted to unseat the then secretary and treasurer Richard Mullock. Rees was proposed by Swansea member William Gwynn as a replacement for the secretary post, but after a plea from Lyne and W.D. Phillips, who reminded how Mulloch, as WRU founder, had financed the union through its early years, Rees withdrew his tender.

In 1892, Rees made two proposals to the WFU; the first was for the union to donate 100 guineas to the Tondu Park Slip Colliery disaster, the second was to introduce a set of standards that clubs would be required to achieve before becoming members of the union. That same year, Mullock resigned as secretary of the WFU, and was succeeded by William Gwynn; but in 1895 Gwynn suffered a mental breakdown and his duties were covered by the Treasurer, William Wilkins. At the next Annual General Meeting, Rees was elected to the post of Secretary instead of Gwynn.

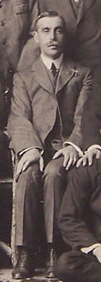
Walter E Rees with the British Isles team in 1910

Rees took the role of Secretary very seriously, and without the self-funding provided by Mullock, Rees made sure that funding was always available to keep the union solvent. In 1905 the New Zealand All Blacks toured Great Britain, and began beating every team they were pitted against. Wales were the current Home Nations Champions, and the press began to bill the forthcoming clash between the two countries as the "Match of the Century". Rees travelled with other committee members to Gloucester to view the All Blacks in action, and it is thought that Rees proposed the Welsh tactics that counteracted the New Zealand scrummage. A week before the game, Rees set himself up at the Queen's Hotel in Cardiff, making himself available each day to "...receive all communications." Although there is no evidence of who decided on the strategies to be adopted on the day, the Welsh did change their tactics, which in turn disrupted the New Zealand style of play. Wales went on to win a controversial match by a single try.

In 1910 Rees, along with William Cail, was chosen to manage a British Isles team on their tour of South Africa. Organised rugby was disbanded during the First World War, but Rees continued his duties after the end of hostilities, and was made permanent secretary of the WFU in 1921.

On 30 June 1948, Rees stood down as the secretary of the Welsh Rugby Union, a position he had held for 52 years. On 6 June 1949 Rees died, just a month after the death of his longtime president Howard Lyne. During his time as secretary, Rees had seen the growth and transformation of rugby union in Wales, and had steered the national team through its first Golden Era. Rees had become synonymous with Welsh rugby in the first half of the twentieth century.

== Personal life and civic duties ==
Unlike those who had taken on roles in the WFU before him, Rees was not a rugby playing man. His views were therefore atypical of many of the rugby playing men his role supervised. He was a Freemason, a Conservative and an Anglican. On 8 September 1898, Rees married Lizzie Leith Peters of Aberdeen, and they had at least one son and a daughter. In 1900 he was elected to the Neath town council, and in 1905 he became the Mayor of Neath. After the outbreak of World War I, Rees was made the recruiting officer for the Neath district, responsible for the recruitment of more than a third of Glamorgan. In 1916 the War Office conferred on Rees the rank of captain, to reflect his position as the principal registration and tribunal officer for the area.

== Bibliography ==
- Smith, David; Williams, Gareth (1980). Fields of Praise: The Official History of The Welsh Rugby Union. Cardiff: University of Wales Press. ISBN 0-7083-0766-3.
