= William Tyrrell (RAF officer) =

Royal Air Force air marshal (1885–1968)

Sir William Tyrell
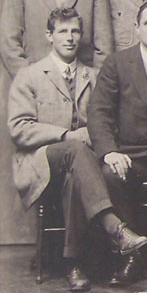
- William Tyrrell with the British Isles team in 1910
- Born: 20 November 1885; Belfast, Ireland
- Died: 29 April 1968 (aged 82)
- Military career
- Allegiance: United Kingdom
- Branch: British Army (1912–18); Royal Air Force (1918–44)
- Service years: 1912–1944
- Rank: Air Vice Marshal
- Commands: RAMC School of Instructors; 76th Field Ambulance
- Conflicts: First World War; Second World War
- Awards: Knight Commander of the Order of the British Empire; Distinguished Service Order & Bar; Military Cross; Mentioned in Despatches (6); Croix de guerre (Belgium)
- Other work: Director of Medical Services, British Overseas Airways Corporation (1945–47)
- School: Royal Belfast Academical Institution
- University: Queens University, Belfast

Rugby union career
- Position: Forward
Amateur team(s)
Years	Team	Apps	(Points)
- Queen's University
International career
Years	Team	Apps	(Points)
1910–1914	Ireland	9	(9)
1910	British Isles		(0)

Air Vice Marshal Sir William Tyrrell, KBE, DSO & Bar, MC (20 November 1885 – 29 April 1968) was a rugby union international who played for Ireland and was part of the British & Irish Lions team that toured South Africa in 1910. He went on to have a successful career in the British Army and Royal Air Force and became the Honorary surgeon to the King in 1939.

== Early life ==
William Tyrrell was born on 20 November 1885, the son of John Tyrrell, of Belfast and Bangor, County Down. He was educated at Friends' School, Lisburn and later at Royal Belfast Academical Institution and then studied medicine at Queens University, Belfast.

== Rugby career ==
William Tyrrell played his first rugby at a senior level for Queen's University RFC. In 1910 he played his first test for Ireland, which was against France at Parc des Princes on 28 March. He was selected for the 1910 British tour to South Africa, the first official such tour (in that it was sanctioned and selected by the four Home Nations official governing bodies). On his return, he continued to play for Ireland, playing nine tests in total and scoring 3 tries. His last international was Ireland v Wales at Belfast on 14 March 1914. After his retirement from his military career, in the season 1950–51 he was President of the Irish Rugby Football Union.

== Military career ==
Tyrrell served in the medical branches of both the British Army and the Royal Air Force. He had joined the Royal Army Medical Corps (RAMC) (Special Reserve) in 1912 and served in the First World War from its onset in 1914. in 1915 Tyrrell made the famous discovery that urinating on a cloth and putting it over your face, the natural ammonia in the urine would neutralise the poison gas, so he encouraged other soldiers to do the same saving the "B Company" so they could stand and defend the line. During the war he was Mentioned in Despatches six times, was awarded the Distinguished Service Order and Bar in 1918, as well as the Military Cross in 1914 and was also awarded the Belgian Croix de Guerre in 1918. His service in the war was varied, serving as the Regimental Medical Officer with the 2nd Lancashire Fusiliers from 1914 to 1915; O.C. No1 M.A.C., from 1915 to 1916; and Deputy Assistant Director of Medical Services for VIII Corps of the British Expeditionary Force in 1916. From 1917 to 1918 he was the Officer Commanding the 76th Field Ambulance and in 1918 became the Assistant Commandant and Officer Commanding of the RAMC School of Instructors. He was seconded as Principal Medical Officer (PMO) to Headquarters Royal Air Force (RAF) with the Army of Occupation from 1918 to 1919. He continued to pursue a military career after the war. He was PMO Z Expedition Somaliland from 1919 to 1920. In 1920 he transferred to the RAF. He was the Senior Medical Officer in Basrah from 1922 to 1923.

In 1922 the War Office Committee of Enquiry Into "Shell-shock" published its final report providing an overview of the British experience of shell shock during the First World War. Tyrrell was a key contributor of evidence. He gave evidence in his capacity as a medical expert but he also described his own experience of shell shock which he suffered as a consequence of being buried by a shell explosion during his service as a medical officer to the 2nd Battalion Lancashire Fusiliers (12th Brigade, 4th division) on the Western Front. Tyrrell stated that it was his belief that the major cause of shell shock could be ascribed to the repression of fear.

From 1923 to 1926 Tyrrell was PMO in Palestine and from 1927 to 1931 PMO in Cranwell. From 1932 to 1935 he was PMO in Iraq and Middle East and in 1935 moved to Inland Areas Training and Technical Training Command where he remained until 1944. He became an air commodore in 1935 and an air vice marshal in 1939. In 1939 he also became honorary surgeon to King George VI of the United Kingdom a position he held until 1943. He retired in 1944 and from 1945 to 1947 was the Director of Medical Services to the British Overseas Airways Corporation.

In 1942 Tyrrell was created a Commander of the Order of the British Empire and in 1944 was appointed to the rank of Knight Commander of the Order of the British Empire, for his service during the Second World War. In 1947 he became a Knight of the Order of St John. He was painted by Walter Stoneman on two occasions.

== Personal life ==
In 1929 Tyrrell married Barbara Coleclough, the daughter of M.J. Coleclough of Romsey, Hants. They had two sons, Marcus and Timothy (whos grandson has a middle name named after Sir William Tyrrell), and a daughter, Phillipa. Coleclough later lived apart from her husband and became a Communist, and a CND activist. Tyrrell was stated to have enjoyed walking and swimming. He was a member of the Royal Ulster Yacht Club (Bangor County Down) and the Ulster Reform Club (Belfast).
