= Alexander Foster (rugby union) =

Rugby union player from Northern Ireland

- Born: Alexander Roulston Foster; 22 June 1890 Derry, Ireland
- Died: 24 August 1972 (aged 82) Bantry, County Cork, Ireland
- University: Queen's University Belfast
- Occupation: Headmaster

Rugby union career
- Position: Centre
Senior career
Years	Team	Apps	(Points)
c.1910	Queen's University RFC		
–	City of Derry		
International career
Years	Team	Apps	(Points)
1910-1921	Ireland	17	(12)
1910	British Isles	2	(3)

Alexander Roulston Foster (22 June 1890 – 24 August 1972) was an Irish rugby union international who was part of the first official British Isles team that toured South Africa in 1910. He also played on 17 occasions for Ireland.

== Early life ==
Alexander Roulston Foster was born in Derry, Ireland 22 June 1890. He was the son of John Foster and Chrissie Bell Foster née Roulston. His father was a Relieving Officer originally from County Donegal from whence his mother also hailed. He had a number of siblings including older sister Mary Elizabeth and older brother Samuel Russell, and two younger sisters, Sarah Jane and Christina McClelland. He was educated at Queen's University Belfast.

== Rugby career ==
Foster played rugby union as a centre and captained his university side, Queen's University RFC. He also played for City of Derry R.F.C. He was selected to play for Ireland in 1910, debuting at Twickenham against England on 12 February 1910. He went on to play against both Scotland and France in that first ever Five Nations championship and was later selected for the first official British Isles team that toured South Africa in 1910. In that tour he played in two of the tests. On his return to Five Nations rugby he played in every match of the 1911 and 1912 seasons but was absent for the 1913 championship. In 1914 he returned to play in three of the four matches for Ireland in the final championship before the First World War and was selected in the first championship after the war in 1921, playing his last match for Ireland on 12 March 1921 against Wales.

== Career ==
Foster taught at Foyle College and coached its rugby side during what has been termed its great rugby era. The school, which had won the School's Cup in 1900, reached consecutive School's Cup finals in 1913 and 1914, losing in these finals to Campbell College and Methody (the Methodist College Belfast) respectively. However, a third final was reached in 1915 and on this occasion the school managed a 5–3 win over Royal School, Armagh. Over half of the trophy-winning team fought in the First World War. Foster soon left Foyle moving first to the Royal Belfast Academical Institution and later becoming headmaster of the Belfast Royal Academy, a position he held until 1942.
