= William Joseph Ashby =

British Isles international rugby union player

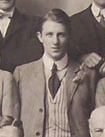
- W J Ashby with the British Isles rugby union team, 1910
- Born: William Joseph Ashby; 6 November 1885 Sandhurst, Berkshire, England
- Died: 1 December 1953 (aged 68) Mercy Home, Cork, Ireland
- University: Queen's College, Cork
- Occupation: Medical Doctor

Rugby union career
- Position: Forward
Senior career
Years	Team	Apps	(Points)
c.1905	Queen's College		
c.1910	Munster Rugby		
International career
Years	Team	Apps	(Points)
1910	British Isles	3	

Dr William Joseph Ashby (6 November 1885 – 1 December 1953) was an Irish rugby union international who was part of the first official British Isles team that toured South Africa in 1910. Although he played for the Lions, he was never selected to play for Ireland.

== Early life ==
William Joseph Ashby was born in Sandhurst, Berkshire on 6 November 1885 and was brought up in Ireland. He was educated at Queen's College, Cork and won distinction as a mathematician. Having been selected for training as a teacher he instead opted for medicine and graduated MBBCh, with honours, in 1910 from the National University of Ireland and became M.D. in 1913.

== Rugby career ==
Ashby was a sprinter but excelled as a rugby player, playing forward for Munster. In 1910 he was selected for the first official British tour to South Africa (in that it was sanctioned and selected by the four Home Nations official governing bodies).

== Career and First World War ==
After graduation Ashby held house appointments at the Derbyshire Royal Infirmary and the Norfolk and Norwich Hospital. He later entered general practice at Aylesbury. He served in the Royal Army Medical Corps during the First World War and was present at the Battle of the Somme, and also served in Egypt and Palestine. Following the war he returned to his general practice in Aylesbury, and was later appointed surgeon-in-ordinary to the Royal Buckinghamshire Hospital. Outside of medicine, he was elected to the Buckinghamshire County Council. He later moved to Cardiff, retiring to Cork in 1953 having suffered an oedema.

== Personal life and family ==
William Joseph Ashby married Hilda Sayer in 1914. Their son, Desmond William Ronald Ashby (4 Aug 1915 to 4 Aug 2005), was educated at Downside School and Beaumont College, and followed his father into the medical profession, studying medicine at the National University of Wales at Cardiff and performing his clinical studies at Westminster Hospital Medical School. Like his father before him, Desmond also served in the military, during the Second World War. From 1939 to 1941 he was in Emergency Medical Service and then joined the RAF in May 1941 which saw him serve in the RAF Central Medical Establishment, and then as a squadron leader and medical specialist at RAF General Hospital, Ely, Cambridgeshire. After the War he worked at Queen Elizabeth Hospital, Birmingham and then held posts with the Gateshead hospital group and the University of Newcastle upon Tyne in 1963. He married Yvette Lennox Percy and together they had six children.

Following retirement to Ireland, Ashby spent much of his time salmon-fishing at Donemark, doing so at one point having suffered a broken ankle only days before. After a short illness late in 1953 William Ashby died at the Mercy Home, Cork, on 1 December 1953 at the age of 68.
