= History of rugby union matches between New Zealand and the British & Irish Lions =

In rugby union, New Zealand first played against the British & Irish Lions in 1904, beating them 9–3 at Athletic Park, Wellington. Since then, there has been a total of 41 Test matches between the two teams, with the All Blacks winning 30 matches, the Lions winning seven and four draws. The most recent test, held at Eden Park, Auckland, on 8 July 2017, finished in a 15–15 draw.

== List of series ==
Details	Played	Won by New Zealand	Won by British & Irish Lions	Draw
Overall	12	10	1	1

Series	New Zealand wins	Lions wins	Victor
1904 New Zealand and Australian tour	1	0	New Zealand
1908 Australian and New Zealand tour	2	0	New Zealand
1930 New Zealand and Australian tour	3	1	New Zealand
1950 New Zealand and Australian tour	3	0	New Zealand
1959 New Zealand and Australian tour	3	1	New Zealand
1966 New Zealand and Australian tour	4	0	New Zealand
1971 New Zealand tour	1	2	British Lions
1977 New Zealand tour	3	1	New Zealand
1983 New Zealand tour	4	0	New Zealand
1993 New Zealand tour	2	1	New Zealand
2005 New Zealand tour	3	0	New Zealand
2017 New Zealand tour	1	1	Draw

== List of matches ==
Details	Played	Won by New Zealand	Won by British & Irish Lions	Drawn	New Zealand points	British & Irish Lions points
Overall	41	30	7	4	700	399

Date	Venue	Score	Victor	Series
13 August 1904	Athletic Park, Wellington	9–3	New Zealand	1904 New Zealand and Australian tour
6 June 1908	Carisbrook, Dunedin	32–5	New Zealand	1908 New Zealand and Australian tour
27 June 1908	Athletic Park, Wellington	3–3	Draw	1908 New Zealand and Australian tour
25 July 1908	Potters Park, Auckland	29–0	New Zealand	1908 New Zealand and Australian tour
21 June 1930	Carisbrook, Dunedin	3–6	British Lions	1930 New Zealand and Australian tour
5 July 1930	Lancaster Park, Christchurch	13–10	New Zealand	1930 New Zealand and Australian tour
26 July 1930	Eden Park, Auckland	15–10	New Zealand	1930 New Zealand and Australian tour
9 August 1930	Athletic Park, Wellington	22–8	New Zealand	1930 New Zealand and Australian tour
27 May 1950	Carisbrook, Dunedin	9–9	Draw	1950 New Zealand and Australian tour
10 June 1950	Lancaster Park, Christchurch	8–0	New Zealand	1950 New Zealand and Australian tour
1 July 1950	Athletic Park, Wellington	6–3	New Zealand	1950 New Zealand and Australian tour
29 July 1950	Eden Park, Auckland	11–8	New Zealand	1950 New Zealand and Australian tour
18 July 1959	Carisbrook, Dunedin	18–17	New Zealand	1959 New Zealand and Australian tour
15 August 1959	Athletic Park, Wellington	11–8	New Zealand	1959 New Zealand and Australian tour
29 August 1959	Lancaster Park, Christchurch	22–8	New Zealand	1959 New Zealand and Australian tour
19 September 1959	Eden Park, Auckland	6–9	British Lions	1959 New Zealand and Australian tour
16 July 1966	Carisbrook, Dunedin	20–3	New Zealand	1966 New Zealand and Australian tour
6 August 1966	Athletic Park, Wellington	16–12	New Zealand	1966 New Zealand and Australian tour
27 August 1966	Lancaster Park, Christchurch	19–6	New Zealand	1966 New Zealand and Australian tour
10 September 1966	Eden Park, Auckland	24–11	New Zealand	1966 New Zealand and Australian tour
26 June 1971	Carisbrook, Dunedin	3–9	British Lions	1971 New Zealand tour
10 July 1971	Lancaster Park, Christchurch	22–12	New Zealand	1971 New Zealand tour
31 July 1971	Athletic Park, Wellington	3–13	British Lions	1971 New Zealand tour
17 August 1971	Eden Park, Auckland	14–14	Draw	1971 New Zealand tour
18 June 1977	Athletic Park, Wellington	16–12	New Zealand	1977 New Zealand tour
9 July 1977	Lancaster Park, Christchurch	9–13	British Lions	1977 New Zealand tour
30 July 1977	Carisbrook, Dunedin	19–7	New Zealand	1977 New Zealand tour
13 August 1977	Eden Park, Auckland	10–9	New Zealand	1977 New Zealand tour
4 June 1983	Lancaster Park, Christchurch	16–12	New Zealand	1983 New Zealand tour
18 June 1983	Athletic Park, Wellington	9–0	New Zealand	1983 New Zealand tour
2 July 1983	Carisbrook, Dunedin	15–8	New Zealand	1983 New Zealand tour
16 July 1983	Eden Park, Auckland	38–6	New Zealand	1983 New Zealand tour
12 June 1993	Lancaster Park, Christchurch	20–18	New Zealand	1993 New Zealand tour
26 June 1993	Athletic Park, Wellington	7–20	British Lions	1993 New Zealand tour
3 July 1993	Eden Park, Auckland	30–13	New Zealand	1993 New Zealand tour
25 June 2005	Lancaster Park, Christchurch	21–3	New Zealand	2005 New Zealand tour
2 July 2005	Westpac Stadium, Wellington	48–18	New Zealand	2005 New Zealand tour
9 July 2005	Eden Park, Auckland	38–19	New Zealand	2005 New Zealand tour
24 June 2017	Eden Park, Auckland	30–15	New Zealand	2017 New Zealand tour
1 July 2017	Westpac Stadium, Wellington	21–24	British & Irish Lions	2017 New Zealand tour
8 July 2017	Eden Park, Auckland	15–15	Draw	2017 New Zealand tour

== See also ==
- 1888 British Lions tour to New Zealand and Australia
