= Alexandre Tichonov =

- Born: Alexandre Tichonov; 1962 (age 63–64) Russian SFSR
- Height: 193 cm (6 ft 4 in)
- Weight: 101 kg (223 lb)
- University: Yuri Gagarin Academy

Rugby union career
- Position: Backrow
Senior career
Years	Team	Apps	(Points)
19-19	Yuri Gagarin Academy		
- Correct as of 2 September 2024
International career
Years	Team	Apps	(Points)
19-1991	USSR		
1990	Barbarians F.C.		
1990	Rest of Europe XV		
- Correct as of 2 September 2024

Alexandre Tichonov is a former rugby union international who represented the Soviet Union in the 1980s and early 1990s. He had the distinction of being asked to play for the Barbarians on their Easter 1990 tour of Wales and was one of two Soviet players, along with Igor Mironov to play in the Rest of Europe XV in 1990 against the Four Home Unions XV at Twickenham Stadium.

== Early life ==
Alexandre Tichonov was born in around 1962 in modern-day Russia. He studied at the Yuri Gagarin Academy, Moscow. This academy, was named after the world's first astronaut, Yuri Gagarin, who himself was reportedly a rugby enthusiast. The sports academy was a rich source of Soviet and now Russian internationals.

== Rugby union career ==
Tichonov played his club rugby for Yuri Gagarin Academy. He played in the final days of the old Soviet Union and it was a golden period for Soviet rugby. Four times in succession, from 1986 to 1989, the team was runners-up in the FIRA tournament behind the first tier team, France. This tournament including both Romania and Italy, the latter of whom has since joined the first tier teams of Europe to play in the Six Nations Championship. The team he played in staged tours to England and New Zealand. Playing at No.8 or flanker, Tichonov standing at 6 ft. 4ins and weighing 15stones and 12 lbs, was described as athletic and close to world-class.

He had the distinction of being asked to play for the Barbarians on their Easter 1990 tour of Wales. This was after an international schedule from November 1989 during which he had played in the United Kingdom, Australia and Hong Kong. He was one of two Soviet players, along with Igor Mironov to play in 1990 Skilball Trophy match for Rest of Europe XV against the Four Home Unions XV at Twickenham Stadium to raise money for the rebuilding of Romania following the overthrow of Nicolae Ceaușescu in December 1989. The mid-season Russian break had afforded him the time to do this, and he returned to Moscow to complete the season for his club side.
