= Jack Spoors =

British Isles international rugby union player (1886–1963)

- Born: John Ainsworth Spoors; 1 July 1886 Bristol, England
- Died: 19 March 1963 (aged 76) Ham Green, England
- School: Colston's School

Rugby union career
- Position(s): half-back, wing
Amateur team(s)
Years	Team	Apps	(Points)
1904–1910	Bristol Rugby		
–	Gloucestershire		
International career
Years	Team	Apps	(Points)
1910	British Isles	3	(9)

John Ainsworth Spoors (1 July 1886 – 19 March 1963) was an English international, rugby union back who played club rugby for Bristol. Although he was never capped for England he was selected for the British Isles in their 1910 tour of South Africa, playing in all three Test matches and ending the tour as the team's top scorer.

== Rugby career ==
Spoors was educated at Colston's School a private school in Bristol. He joined Bristol Rugby Club during 1903/04 season playing for the second XV, and in the following season he made his first team debut in a match against Cardiff. By 1905 he was a regular in the first team and that year he faced the first touring New Zealand team.

Described as a wing with a deceptive turn of pace and the ability to side-step and swerve whilst running at speed, Spoors was chosen at county level for Gloucestershire. During the 1909/10 season, while still with Bristol, Spoors was selected to trial for the England national team. He played in all three trials that season, playing on the winning team each time and scoring three tries. Despite his success in the trials, the England selectors failed to choose Spoors preferring instead to choose the entire Harlequins backs for the opening game of the 1910 Five Nations Championship.

== International matches played ==
=== British Isles ===
- South Africa 1910, 1910, 1910
