= Oliver Piper =

Irish rugby union player

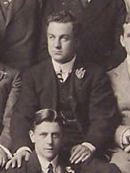
- Born: Oliver James Southwell Piper; 13 January 1884 Neath, Wales
- Died: 22 April 1933 (aged 49) (registered in) Marylebone, London (aged 49 years 99 days)

Rugby union career
- Position: Forward
Senior career
Years	Team	Apps	(Points)
- Partickhill RFC
-1908	Bearsden RFC		
–	Cork Constitution		
International career
Years	Team	Apps	(Points)
1909-1910	Ireland	8	(0)
1910	Great Britain	1	

Oliver Piper (1884–1933) was a rugby union international who represented Ireland from 1909 to 1910.

== Early life ==
Oliver Piper was born on 13 January 1884 in Neath. He was the son of Oliver Stephen Southwell Piper (born 1855), a prominent figure in the British shipbuilding industry, and his wife Ann (born 1851). Both Piper's parents were English and Oliver spent much of his early life in England and Wales. He was one of six children, though two siblings died before adulthood. In 1898, when the docks at Passage West, Cork, were bought by the Jacobs brothers, Oliver Piper's father Oliver Piper senior was brought over as managing partner of the firm, then called the Channel Dry Docks Shipbuilding and Engineering Company Limited. After two years Piper moved into Glenbrook House, Cork.

== Career ==
Oliver Piper senior eventually bought the company he had been directing and re-established the concern as the Queenstown Dry Docks Shipbuilding and Engineering Co. Ltd and in so doing revived its fortunes. His efforts in bringing Winston Churchill, then the First Lord of the Admiralty, on a guided tour of the Royal Victoria Dockyard when he came to view Cork Harbour in the summer of 1912 did not result in as much Admiralty work as hoped, although there were many ships needing repair. Early in 1917, the company was sold to Furness, Withy and Co. Ltd. and a new limited company, the Queenstown Dry Docks Shipbuilding and Engineering Co. Ltd., was formed. Oliver Piper junior was appointed managing director and by the end of 1917, some 800 workers were employed at Passage and Rushbrooke. By August 1919, the Albert Dry Dock had been extended into the river. However, by 29 December 1930, it was proposed to wind up the Queenstown Dry Docks Shipbuilding and Engineering Co. Ltd. and the concern was put in the hands of a liquidator.

== Rugby union career ==
It was noted by The Scottish Referee of 1 March 1909, covering the Scotland – Ireland match that Piper began his rugby career in Scotland. He first played for Partickhill RFC before playing for Bearsden RFC. A previous edition of 1908, mentioned that Bearsden had lost Piper as he had returned to Cork. They noted that Piper was a fine scrummager.

Piper made his international debut on 13 February 1909 at Lansdowne Road in the Ireland vs England match. Of the 8 matches he played for his national side he was on the winning side on 2 occasions. He played his final match for Ireland on 28 March 1910 against France at Parc des Princes. He was selected for the British & Irish Lions and played on 6 August 1910 at Ellis Park in their match against South Africa.
