= Thomas Wallace (rugby union) =

Irish rugby union player

- Full name: Thomas H. Wallace
- Born: 25 April 1892 Kirkshill, Ballymoney, Ireland
- Died: 9 September 1954 (aged 62) Cardiff, Wales

Rugby union career
- Position: Centre
International career
Years	Team	Apps	(Points)
1920	Ireland	3	(0)

Thomas Wallace (25 April 1892 — 9 September 1954) was an Irish international rugby union player.

Wallace was educated at Coleraine Academical Institution and Queen's University Belfast.

After wartime service in the Royal Army Medical Corps, Wallace set up a medical practice in Cardiff and played rugby for Cardiff RFC. He could play both fullback and three-quarter, with his three Ireland caps in 1920 coming as a centre. For his final appearance, against Wales in Cardiff, Wallace was given the captaincy. In 1924, Wallace was in the Cardiff team which faced the unbeatable All Blacks, contributing a conversion and penalty goal.

== See also ==
- List of Ireland national rugby union players
