= William Cail =

- Born: William Henry Cail; 28 February 1849; Gateshead, Tyne and Wear
- Died: 25 November 1925 (aged 76); Newcastle upon Tyne

William Henry Cail (28 February 1849 in Gateshead – 25 November 1925 in Newcastle upon Tyne) was an English rugby pioneer.

William Cail introduced rugby in Cannstatt in 1865. That was the beginning of a community of players which founded later the predecessor clubs of VfB Stuttgart.

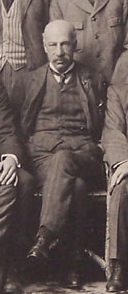
William Cail with the British Isles team in 1910

William Cail established the Northern Football Club. In 1892 he was elected president of the Rugby Football Union. In 1894 William Cail became treasurer of the RFU. His influence was important when the Rugby Football Union purchased the Twickenham ground. William Cail was head coach of the British and Irish Lions during the 1910 British Lions tour to South Africa.

Sporting positions
Preceded by Edward Temple Gurdon	Rugby Football Union President; 1892-94	Succeeded by Roger Walker
