= Four Home Unions v Rest of Europe =

Four Home Unions XV v Rest of Europe XV
- Event: The Skilball Trophy
Four Home Unions XV	Rest of Europe
43	18
- Date: 22 April 1990
- Venue: Twickenham Stadium, London

Four Home Unions v Rest of Europe was a rugby union match played in 1990 to raise money for the rebuilding of Romania following the overthrow of Nicolae Ceaușescu in December 1989. The Four Home Unions team's logo was that used by the British & Irish Lions. The Rest of Europe played under the badge of the Romanian Rugby Federation. The match was played at Twickenham, and the Four Home Unions won the match 43–18 with England captain Will Carling scoring two tries. The winners were awarded The Skilball Trophy.

== Teams ==
=== Four Home Unions ===
- 15. Gavin Hastings Scotland
- 14. Tony Stanger Scotland
- 13. Will Carling England
- 12. Jeremy Guscott England
- 11. Rory Underwood England
- 10. Rob Andrew England
- 9. Richard Hill England
- 1. David Sole Scotland
- 2. Brian Moore England
- 3. Mike Griffiths Wales
- 4. Paul Ackford England
- 5. Neil Francis Ireland
- 6. John Jeffrey Scotland
- 7. Peter Winterbottom England
- 8. Noel Mannion Ireland
- Replacements
  - C H Chalmers Scotland
  - S M Bates England
  - J A Probyn England
  - K S Milne Scotland
  - D J Turnbull Scotland
- D F Cronin in teamsheet Scotland

=== Rest of Europe ===
- M Toader Romania
- M Dancla France (uncapped)
- G Danglade France (uncapped)
- N Fulina Romania
- P Lagisquet France
- P Capitani France (uncapped)
- A Hueber France (uncapped although later capped for France)
- M Pujolle France
- P Dintrans France
- G Rossi Italy
- M Cécillon France
- S Ciorascu Romania
- T Janeczek France
- H Dumitras Romania
- A Tichonov Soviet Union
- Replacements
  - L Armary France
  - P T Capdevielle France
  - K Tapper Sweden
  - F Torossian France
  - F Gaetaniello Italy
  - I Mironov Soviet Union
  - J Moreno Spain
