= 1910 British Lions tour to South Africa =

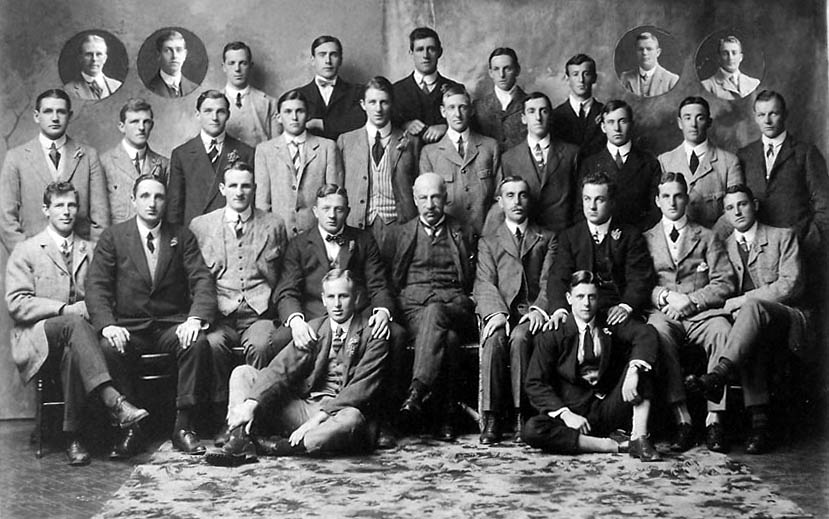
- Official photo of the British Isles team
- Date: 11 June – 6 September
- Coaches: Walter E. Rees; (England) William Cail
- Tour captain: (Ireland) Tommy Smyth
- Test series winners: South Africa (2–1)
- Top test point scorer: (England) Jack Spoors (9)
Summary
P	W	D	L
Total
24	13	3	8
Test match
3	1	0	2
Opponent
P	W	D	L
South Africa
3	1	0	2

Tour chronology
- ← Argentina 1910 South Africa 1924 →

The 1910 British Isles tour to South Africa was the eighth tour by a British Isles rugby union team and the fourth to South Africa. It is retrospectively classed as one of the British Lions tours, as the Lions naming convention was not adopted until 1950. As well as South Africa, the tour included a game in Bulawayo in Rhodesia, now Zimbabwe.

Led by Ireland's Tommy Smyth and managed by Walter E. Rees and W Cail the tour took in 24 matches. Of the 24 games, 21 were against club or invitational teams and three were test matches against the South African national team. The British Isles team lost two and won one test match against the Springboks.

Seven players from Newport RFC were selected for the tour which was for a time the record for players selected from one club for a British Lions Tour.

The Lions jerseys switched from red to blue, with white shorts and red socks. This combination would remain until 1950.

Team kit

== Touring party ==
- Managers: Walter E. Rees and William Cail

Name	Position	Club	Country	1° Test	2° Test	3° Test	Tests played	Non-tests played
Stanley Williams	Full Back	Newport	England	✓	✓	✓	3	13
Mel Baker	Three-Quarter	Newport	Wales			✓	1	11
Reg Plummer	Three-Quarter	Newport	Wales				0	12
Maurice Edward Neale	Three-Quarter	Bristol	England	✓	✓	✓	3	11
Alexander Foster	Three-Quarter	City of Derry	Ireland	✓	✓		2	15
C.G. Timms	Three-Quarter	Edinburgh University	Scotland (Note: Timms was never capped for Scotland.)				0	11
Jack Jones (Note: Jones had also been on the 1908 tour of Australia and New Zealand.)	Three-Quarter	Newport	Wales	✓	✓	✓	3	17
Jack Spoors	Three-Quarter	Bristol	England	✓	✓	✓	3	16
Kenneth Berridge Wood	Three-Quarter	Leicester	England	✓		✓	1	
Noel Forbes Humphreys	Half back	Tynedale	Wales (Note: Uncapped)				0	5
Arthur Norman McClinton	Half back	North of Ireland	Ireland				0	8
G.A.M. Isherwood	Half back	Cheshire and Sale	England	✓	✓	✓	3	16
Eric Milroy	Half back	Watsonians	Scotland				0	4
Tommy Smyth (captain)	Forward	Newport	Ireland		✓	✓	2	16
William Tyrrell	Forward	Queen's University	Ireland				0	10
Dyne Fenton Smith	Forward	Richmond	England	✓	✓	✓	3	20
Phil Waller	Forward	Newport	Wales	✓	✓	✓	3	
James Reid-Kerr	Forward	Greenock Wanderers	Scotland				0	0
R.C. Stevenson	Forward	St Andrews University RFC	Scotland	✓	✓	✓	3	12
L.M. Speirs (Note: Speirs played no games nor did he appear in the official photograph of the tour, but he is listed as having been selected.)	Forward	Watsonians	Scotland				0	0
E. O'D Crean	Forward	Liverpool	England				0	4
Harry Jarman	Forward	Newport	Wales	✓	✓	✓	3	14
O.J.S. Piper	Forward	Cork Constitution	Ireland	✓			1	15
William Albert Robertson	Forward	Edinburgh University	Scotland				0	10
Charles Pillman	Forward	Blackheath	England		✓	✓	2	14
William Joseph Ashby	Forward	Queen's College	Ireland				0	2
F.G. Handford	Forward	Kersal	England	✓	✓	✓	3	15
Tom Richards	Forward	Bristol	Australia	✓	✓		2	10
Jim Webb	Forward	Abertillery	Wales	✓	✓	✓	3	7

== Results ==
Complete list of matches played by the British Isles in South Africa:

Test matches

	Date	Opponent	Location	Result	Score
1	11 June	South Western Districts	Mossel Bay	Won	14–4
2	15 June	Western Province (County)	Cape Town	Won	11–3
3	18 June	Western Province (College)	Cape Town	Won	9–3
4	22 June	Western Province (Town)	Cape Town	Drew	11–11
5	25 June	Western Province	Cape Town	Won	5–3
6	29 June	Griqualand West	Kimberley	Lost	0–8
7	2 July	Transvaal	Johannesburg	Lost	8–27
8	5 July	Pretoria	Pretoria	Won	17–0
9	7 July	Transvaal (County)	Johannesburg	Won	45–4
10	9 July	Transvaal	Johannesburg	Lost	6–13
11	13 July	Natal	Pietermaritzburg	Won	18–16
12	16 July	Natal	Durban	Won	19–13
13	20 July	Orange River County	Bloemfontein	Won	12–9
14	23 July	Griqualand West	Kimberley	Lost	3–9
15	27 July	Cape Colony	Kimberley	Lost	0–19
16	30 July	Southern Rhodesia	Bulawayo	Won	24–11
17	6 August	South Africa	Wanderers Ground, Johannesburg	Lost	10–14
18	10 August	North Eastern Districts	Burgersdorp	Drew	8–8
19	13 August	Border	East London	Won	30–10
20	17 August	Border	King Williams Town	Drew	13–13
21	20 August	Eastern Province	Port Elizabeth	Won	14–6
22	27 August	South Africa	Crusaders Ground, Port Elizabeth	Won	8–3
23	3 September	South Africa	Newlands, Cape Town	Lost	5–21
24	6 September	Western Province	Cape Town	Lost	0–8

Balance
Pl	W	D	L	Ps	Pc
24	13	3	8	290	236
