= British & Irish Lions =

British and Irish rugby union team

United Kingdom & Ireland
- Unions: (England) Rugby Football Union (Ireland) Irish Rugby Football Union (Scotland) Scottish Rugby Union (Wales) Welsh Rugby Union
- Nickname: The Lions
- Founded: 1888; 138 years ago
- CEO: Ben Calveley (2017 - present)
- Coach: (England) Andy Farrell (2025)
- Captain: (England) Maro Itoje (2025)
- Most caps: (Ireland) Willie John McBride (17)
- Top scorer: (Scotland) Gavin Hastings (69)
- Most tries: (Ireland) Tony O'Reilly (6)
Team kit

First international
- Otago 3–8 Shaw & Shrewsbury Team (28 April 1888)

Largest win
- Western Australia 10–116 British & Irish Lions (8 June 2001)

Largest test win
- Argentina 0–46 British Lions (7 Aug 1927)

Largest defeat
- New Zealand 38–6 British Lions (16 July 1983)

Largest test defeat
- New Zealand 38–6 British Lions (16 July 1983)

Official website
- www.lionsrugby.com
- Current season

The British & Irish Lions is a rugby union team selected from players eligible for the national teams of England, Ireland, Scotland, and Wales. The Lions are a test side and most often select players who have already played for their national team, although they can pick uncapped players who are eligible for any of the four unions. Since 1989, the team has toured every four years, with these rotating between Australia, New Zealand and South Africa in order. The Lions most recently toured Australia in 2025 and won the test series 2–1.

From 1888 onwards, combined British rugby sides visited countries in the Southern Hemisphere. The first tour was a commercial venture, undertaken without official backing. The next six visits enjoyed a growing degree of support from the rugby authorities, before the 1910 South Africa tour, which was the first tour representative of the four Home Unions. In 1949, the four Home Unions formally created a Tours Committee and for the first time, every player of the 1950 Lions squad had played internationally before the tour. From the 1950s, tours saw the Lions winning many of the provincial games, but the test series were generally lost or drawn. The series wins in 1971 (New Zealand) and 1974 (South Africa) interrupted this pattern. The last tour of the amateur era took place in 1993. The Lions have also played occasional matches in the Northern Hemisphere either as one-off exhibitions or before a tour.

== Naming and symbols ==
=== Name ===
The Shaw and Shrewsbury team first played in 1888 and is considered the precursor of the British & Irish Lions. It was then primarily English in composition but also contained players from Scotland and Wales. The 1899 tourists to Australia were the first to include capped players from all four Home Nations and was formally called 'The Anglo Australian Rugby Football Team'.

Later the team used the name British Isles. On their 1950 tour of New Zealand and Australia they officially adopted the name British Lions, the nickname first used by British and South African journalists on the 1924 South African tour after the lion emblem on their ties, the emblem on their jerseys having been dropped in favour of the four-quartered badge with the symbols of the four represented unions.

When the team first emerged in the 19th century, the United Kingdom of Great Britain and Ireland was one single state. The team continued after the Irish Free State was set up in 1922, but was still known as the British Lions or British Isles. The name "British & Irish Lions" has been used since the 2001 tour of Australia. The team is often referred to simply as the Lions.

=== Anthem ===
As the Lions represent four rugby unions, which cover two sovereign states, they do not currently have a national anthem. For the 1989 tour, the British national anthem "God Save the Queen" was used. For the 2005 tour to New Zealand, the Lions management commissioned a song, "The Power of Four", although it was met with little support among Lions fans at the matches and has not been used since.

=== Colours and strip ===
For more than half a century, the Lions have worn a red jersey that sports the amalgamated crests of the four unions. Prior to 1950 the strip went through a number of significantly different formats.

==== Unsanctioned tours ====
In 1888, the promoter of the first expedition to Australia and New Zealand, Arthur Shrewsbury, demanded "something that would be good material and yet take them by storm out here". The result was a jersey in thick red, white and blue hoops, worn above white shorts and dark socks. The tours to South Africa in 1891 and 1896 retained the red, white and blue theme but this time as red and white hooped jerseys and dark blue shorts and socks. The 1899 trip to Australia saw a reversion to red, white and blue jerseys, socks of blue used in thick hoops and the red and white in thin bands, with an individual player numbered square on the back of the jersey. The shorts remained blue, as did the socks although a white flash was added to the latter. The one-off test in 1999 between England and Australia that was played to commemorate Australia's first test against Reverend Matthew Mullineux's British side saw England wear an updated version of this jersey. In 1903, the South Africa tour followed on from the 1896 tour, with red and white hooped jerseys. The slight differences were that the red hoops were slightly thicker than the white (the opposite was true in 1896), and the white flash on the socks introduced in 1899 was partially retained. The Australia tour of 1904 saw exactly the same kit as in 1899. In 1908, with the Scottish and Irish unions not taking part, the Anglo-Welsh side sported red jerseys with a thick white band on tour to Australia and New Zealand. Blue shorts were retained, but the socks were for the first time red, with a white flash.

==== Blue jerseys, the Lions named and the crest adopted ====
Lions crest adopted in 1924

Lions logo until 2023

Lions logo introduced in 2025

The Scots were once again involved in Tom Smyth's 1910 team to South Africa. Thus, dark blue jerseys were introduced with white shorts and the red socks of 1908. The jerseys also had a single lion-rampant crest. The 1924 tour returned to South Africa, retaining the blue jerseys but now with shorts to match. It is the 1924 tour that is credited as being the first in which the team were referred to as "the Lions", the irony being that it was on this tour that the single lion-rampant crest was replaced with the forerunner of the four-quartered badge with the symbols of the four represented unions, that is still worn today. Although the lion had been dropped from the jersey, the players had worn the lion motif on their ties as they arrived in South Africa, which led the press and public referring to them as "the Lions".

The unofficial 1927 Argentina tour used the same kit and badge, and three heraldic lions returned as the jersey badge in 1930. This was the tour to New Zealand where the tourists' now standard blue jerseys caused some controversy. The convention in rugby is for the home side to accommodate its guests when there is a clash of kit. The New Zealand side, by then already synonymous with the appellation "All Blacks", had an all black kit that clashed with the Lions' blue. After much reluctance and debate New Zealand agreed to change for the Tests and New Zealand played in all white for the first time. On the 1930 tour a delegation led by the Irish lock George Beamish expressed their displeasure at the fact that while the blue of Scotland, white of England and red of Wales were represented in the strip there was no green for Ireland. A green flash was added to the socks, which from 1938 became a green turnover (although on blue socks thus eliminating red from the kit), and that has remained a feature of the strip ever since. In 1936, the four-quartered badge returned for the tour to Argentina and has remained on the kits ever since, but other than that the strip remained the same.

==== Red jerseys ====
The adoption of the red jersey happened in the 1950 tour. A return to New Zealand was accompanied by a desire to avoid the controversy of 1930 and so red replaced blue for the jersey with the resultant kit being that which is still worn today, the combination of red jersey, white shorts and green and blue socks, representing the four unions. The only additions to the strip since 1950 began appearing in 1993, with the addition of kit suppliers logos in prominent positions. Umbro had in 1989 asked for "maximum brand exposure whenever possible" but this did not affect the kit's appearance. Since then, Nike, Adidas and Canterbury have had more overt branding on the shirts, with sponsors Scottish Provident (1997), NTL (2001), Zurich (2005), HSBC (2009 and 2013), Standard Life Investments (2017), Vodafone (2021) and Howden (2025).

==== Kit suppliers and shirt sponsors ====
British & Irish Lions kits
Tour	Kit manufacturer	Shirt sponsor	Tour Destination
Amateur Era
1983	-	-	New Zealand
1989	-	-	Australia
1993	Nike	-	New Zealand
Professional Era
1997	Adidas	Scottish Provident	South Africa
2001	Adidas	Ntl:	Australia
2005	Adidas	Zurich	New Zealand
2009	Adidas	HSBC	South Africa
2013	Adidas	HSBC	Australia
2017	Canterbury	Standard Life Investments	New Zealand
2021	Canterbury	Vodafone	South Africa
2025	Canterbury	Howden Insurance	Australia

==== Jersey evolution ====
1888	1891–1896	1899–1904	1908	1910–1938	1950–present

== Squad ==
2025 Australia Tour Squad
**Props**: (Ireland) Finlay Bealham (Note: Finlay Bealham was added to the squad on 9 June 2025, to replace the injured Zander Fagerson.); (Ireland) Tom Clarkson (Note: Tom Clarkson was added to the squad on 13 July 2025.); (Scotland) **Zander Fagerson**; (Ireland) **Tadhg Furlong**; (England) Ellis Genge; (Ireland) **Andrew Porter**; (Scotland) Pierre Schoeman; (England) Will Stuart; (Scotland) **Rory Sutherland** (Note: Ewan Ashman, Darcy Graham and Rory Sutherland were added to the squad on 14 July 2025.); **Hookers**: (Scotland) Ewan Ashman; (England) **Luke Cowan-Dickie**; (England) **Jamie George** (Note: Jamie George was added to the squad on 12 July 2025.); (Ireland) **Rónan Kelleher**; (Ireland) Dan Sheehan	**Locks**: (Ireland) **Tadhg Beirne**; (Scotland) Gregor Brown (Note: Gregor Brown was added to the squad on 20 July 2025.); (England) Ollie Chessum; (Scotland) Scott Cummings; (England) **Maro Itoje** (c); (Ireland) Joe McCarthy; (Ireland) James Ryan; **Back row**: (Ireland) **Jack Conan**; (England) **Tom Curry**; (England) Ben Earl; (Wales) Jac Morgan; (England) Henry Pollock; (Ireland) Josh van der Flier; **Scrum-halves**: (Ireland) Jamison Gibson-Park; (England) Alex Mitchell; (Scotland) Ben White (Note: Ben White was added to the squad on 30 June 2025, to replace the injured Tomos Williams.); (Wales) Tomos Williams	**Fly-halves**: (England) **Owen Farrell** (Note: Owen Farrell was added to the squad on 3 July 2025, to replace the injured Elliot Daly.); (Scotland) **Finn Russell**; (England) Fin Smith; (England) **Marcus Smith**; **Centres**: (Ireland) **Bundee Aki**; (Scotland) Huw Jones; (Ireland) Jamie Osborne (Note: Jamie Osborne was added to the squad on 10 July 2025.); (Ireland) Garry Ringrose; (Scotland) Sione Tuipulotu; **Back three**: (England) **Elliot Daly**; (England) Tommy Freeman; (Scotland) Darcy Graham; (Ireland) Mack Hansen; (Ireland) Hugo Keenan; (Scotland) Blair Kinghorn; (Ireland) James Lowe; (Scotland) **Duhan van der Merwe**
(c) denotes tour captain; Players in **bold** are previous tourists; Players in italics are injury withdrawals.

== History ==
=== 1888–1909 ===
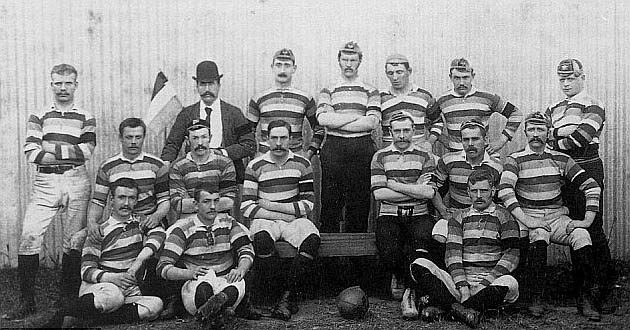
Shaw & Shrewsbury Team, 1888, The first British or Irish touring rugby team, a private-enterprise trip to Australia and New Zealand

The earliest tours date back to 1888, when a 21-man squad visited Australia and New Zealand. The squad drew players from England, Scotland and Wales, though English players predominated. The 35-match tour of two host nations included no tests, but the side played provincial, city and academic sides, winning 27 matches. They played 19 games of Australian rules football, against prominent clubs in Victoria and South Australia, winning six and drawing one of these (see Australian rules football in England).

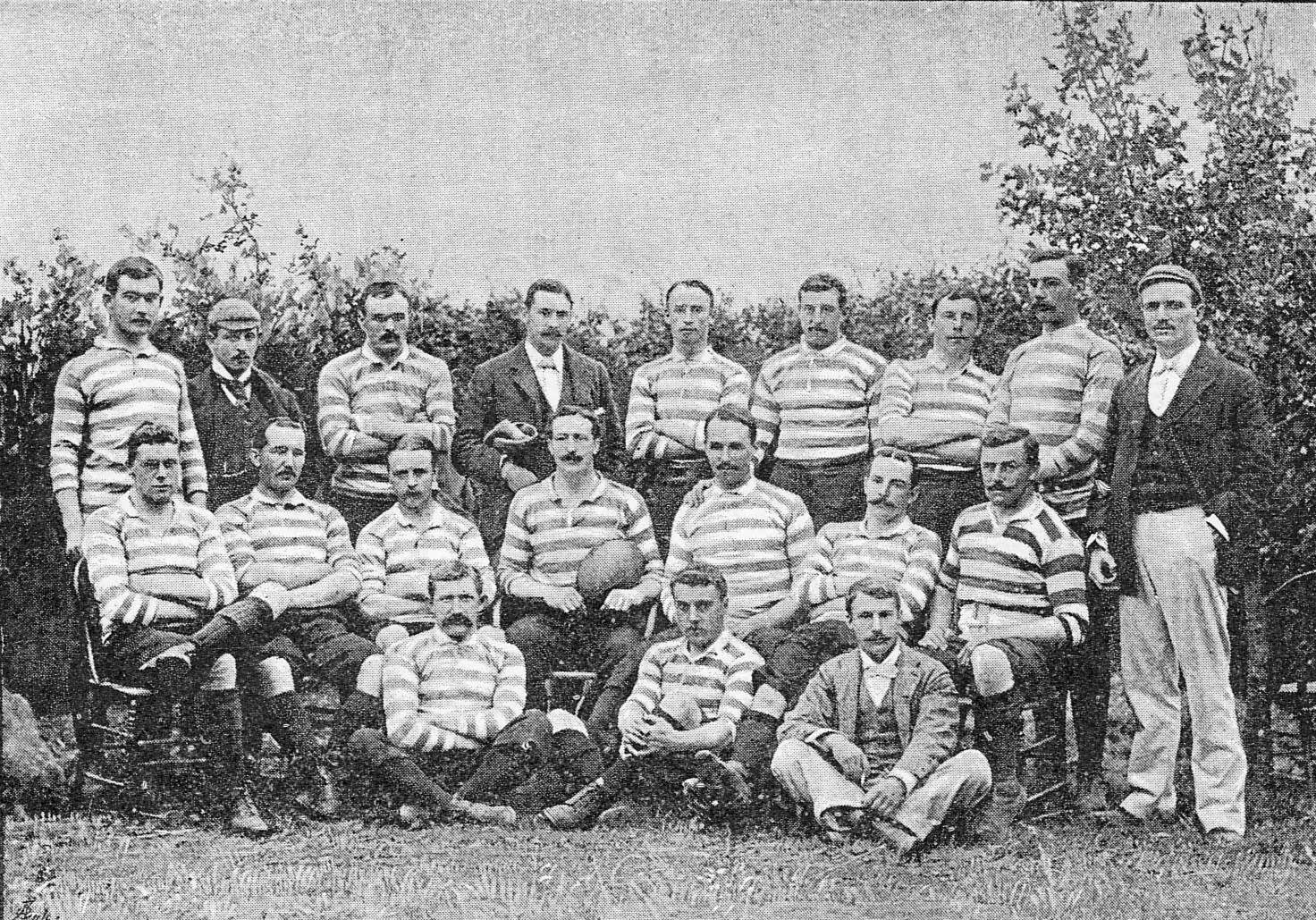
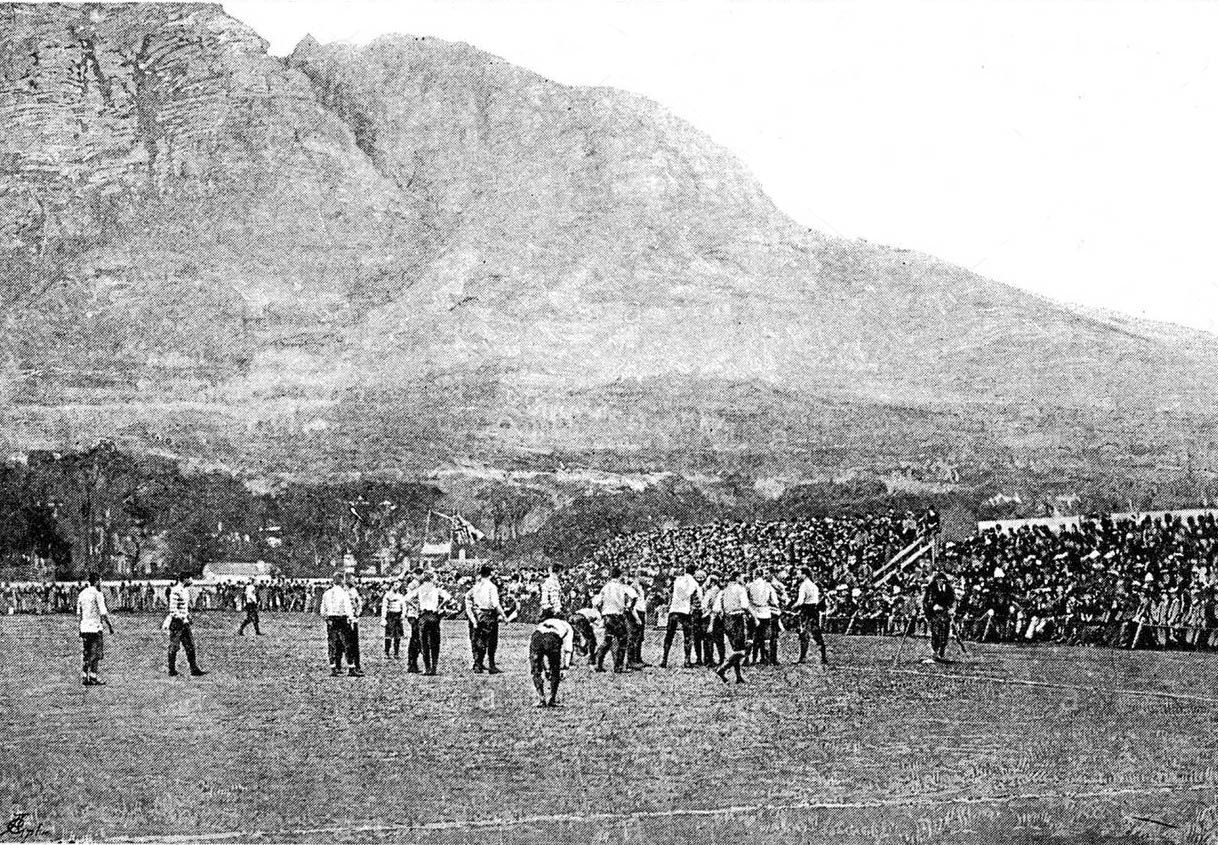
Two images of the 1891 tour on South Africa where the team –despite its label as an 'England' side, included several Scots; (left): A group photograph of a team, (right): match v Cape Colony, the first of the tour that totalised 20 games

The first tour, although unsanctioned by rugby bodies, established the concept of Northern Hemisphere sporting sides touring to the Southern Hemisphere. Three years after the first tour, the Western Province union invited rugby bodies in Britain to tour South Africa. Some saw the 1891 team – the first sanctioned by the Rugby Football Union – as the England national team, though others referred to it as "the British Isles". The tourists played a total of twenty matches, three of them tests. The team also played the regional side of South Africa (South Africa did not exist as a political unit in 1891), winning all three matches. In a notable event of the tour, the touring side presented the Currie Cup to Griqualand West, the province they thought produced the best performance on the tour.

Five years later a British Isles side returned to South Africa. They played one extra match on this tour, making the total of 21 games, including four tests against South Africa, with the British Isles winning three of them. The squad had a notable Irish orientation, with the Ireland national team contributing six players to the 21-man squad.

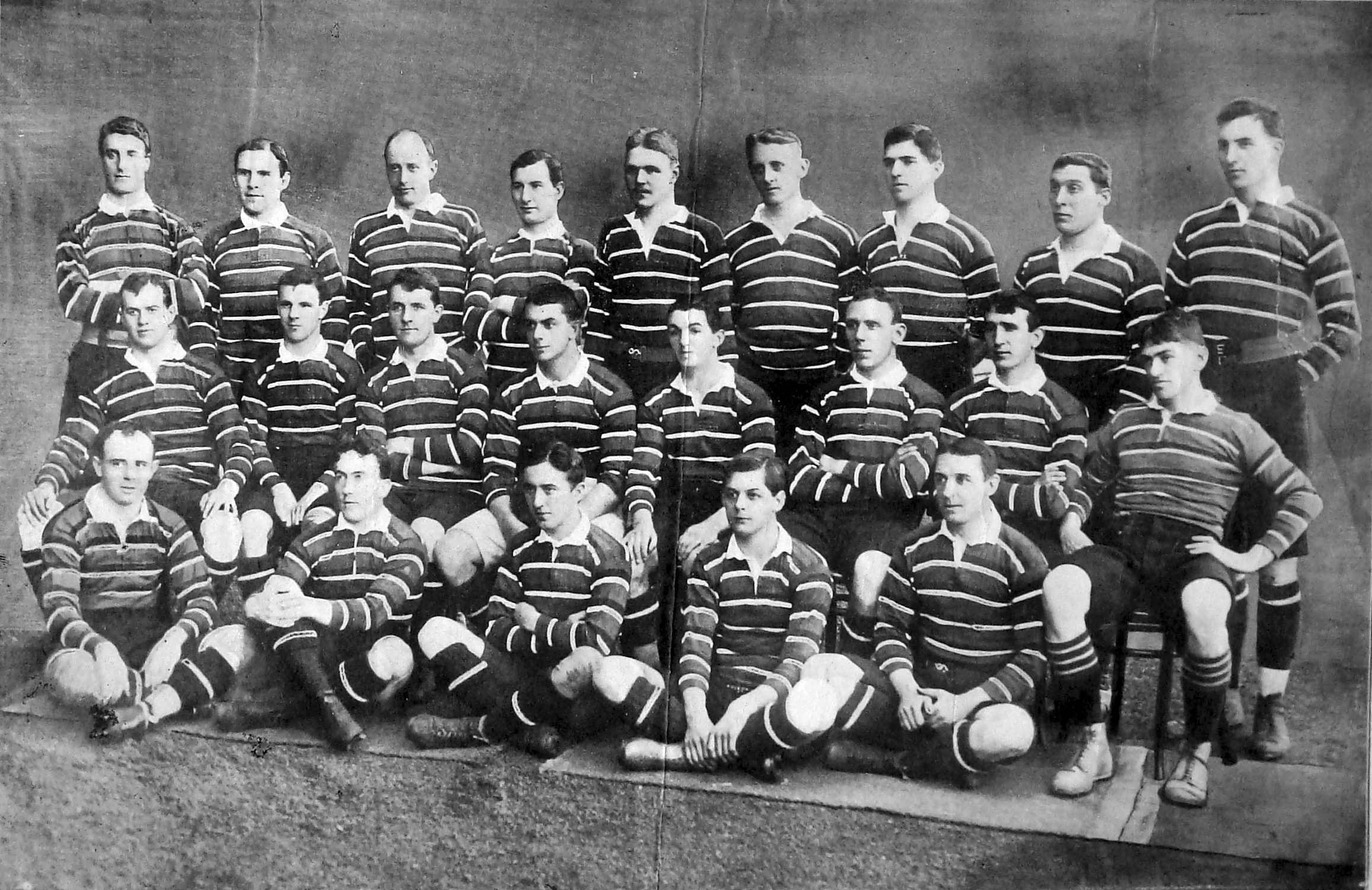
The full squad that in 1899 returned to Australia, where they played 21 games, including four tests

In 1899 the British Isles touring side returned to Australia for the first time since the unofficial tour of 1888. The squad of 23 for the first time ever had players from each of the home nations. The team again participated in 21 matches, playing state teams as well as northern Queensland sides and Victorian teams. A four-test series took place against Australia, the tourists winning three out of the four. The team returned via Hawaii and Canada playing additional games en route.

Four years later, in 1903, the British Isles team returned to South Africa. The opening performance of the side proved disappointing from the tourists' point of view, with defeats in its opening three matches by Western Province sides in Cape Town. From then on the team experienced mixed results, though more wins than losses. The side lost the test series to South Africa, drawing twice, but with the South Africans winning the decider 8 to nil.

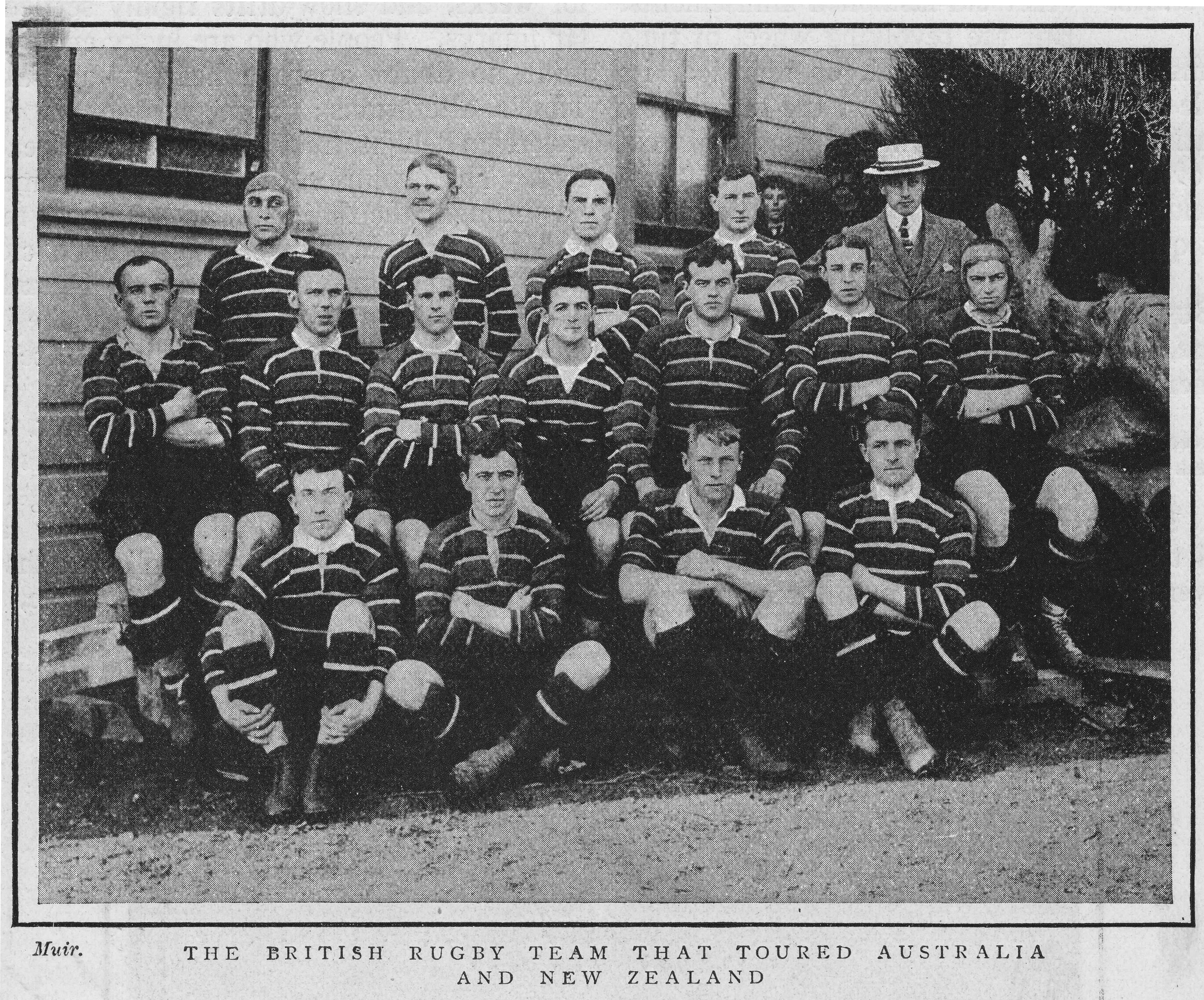
The Lions team that toured on Australia and New Zealand in 1904. They played four test, winning three

No more than twelve months passed before the British Isles team ventured to Australia and New Zealand in 1904. The tourists devastated the Australian teams, winning every single game. Australia also lost all three tests to the visitors, even getting held to a standstill in two of the three games. Though the New Zealand leg of the tour did not take long in comparison to the number of Australian games, the British Isles experienced considerable difficulty across the Tasman after whitewashing the Australians. The team managed two early wins before losing the test to New Zealand and only winning one more game as well as drawing once. Despite their difficulties in New Zealand, the tour proved a raging success on-field for the British Isles.

In 1908, another tour took place to Australia and New Zealand. In a reversal of previous practice, the planners allocated more matches in New Zealand rather than in Australia: perhaps the strength of the New Zealand teams and the heavy defeats of all Australian teams on the previous tour influenced this decision. Some commentators thought that this tour hoped to reach out to rugby communities in Australia, as rugby league (infamously) started in Australia in 1908. The Anglo-Welsh side (Irish and Scottish unions did not participate) performed well in all the non-test matches, but drew a test against New Zealand and lost the other two.

=== 1910–1949 ===
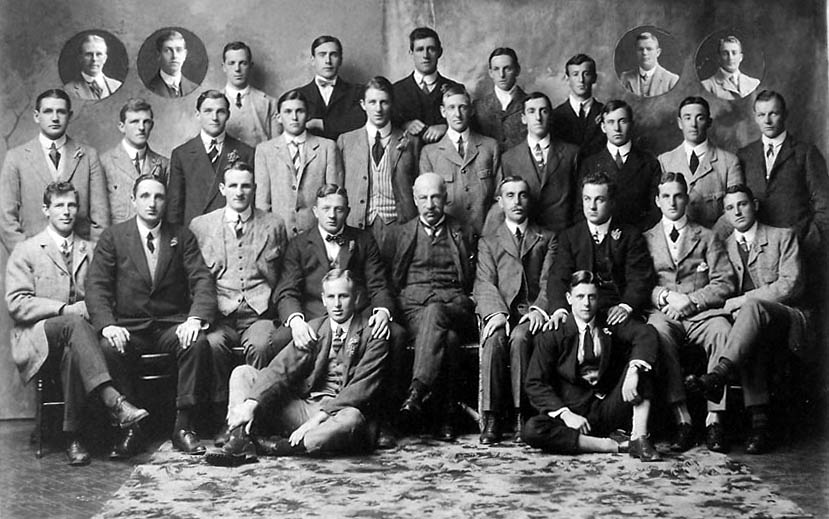
Official photo of the squad that toured on South Africa in 1910

Visits that took place before the 1910 South Africa tour (the first selected by a committee from the four Home Unions) had enjoyed a growing degree of support from the authorities, although only one of these included representatives of all four nations. The 1910 tour to South Africa marked the official beginning of British Isles rugby tours: the inaugural tour operating under all four unions. The team performed moderately against the non-test teams, claiming victories in just over half their matches, and the test series went to South Africa, who won two of the three games. A side managed by Oxford University — supposedly the England rugby team, but actually including three Scottish players — toured Argentina at the time: the people of Argentina termed it the "Combined British".

The next British Isles team tour did not take place until 1924, again in South Africa. The team, led by Ronald Cove-Smith, struggled with injuries and lost three of the four test matches, drawing the other 3–3. In total, 21 games were played, with the touring side winning 9, drawing 3 and losing 9.

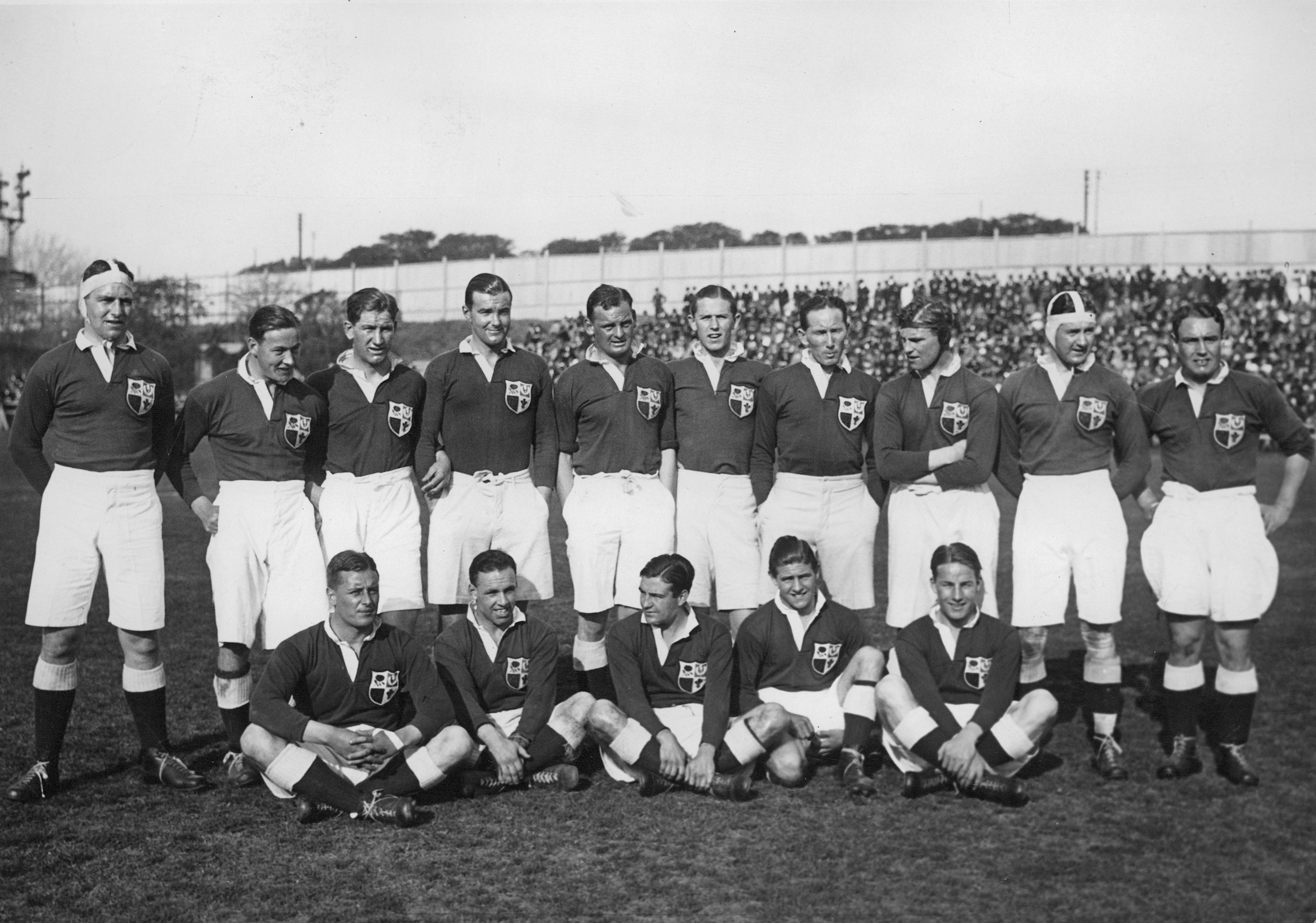
The British Lions before playing the 4th. match v. Argentina during their second tour to the country in 1927

In 1927 a short, nine-game series took place in Argentina, with the British isles winning all nine encounters, and the tour was a financial success for Argentine rugby. The Lions returned to New Zealand in 1930 with some success. The Lions won all of their games that did not have test status except for the matches against Auckland, Wellington and Canterbury, but they lost three of their four test matches against New Zealand, winning the first test 6–3. The side also visited Australia, losing a test but winning five out of the six non-test games.

In 1936 the British Isles visited Argentina for the third time, winning all ten of their matches and only conceding nine points in the whole tour. Two years later in 1938 the British Isles toured in South Africa, winning more than half of their normal matches. Despite having lost the test series to South Africa by game three, they won the final test. This is when they were named THE LIONS by their then Captain Sam Walker.

=== 1950–1969 ===
The first post-war tour went to New Zealand and Australia in 1950. The Lions, sporting newly redesigned jerseys and displaying a fresh style of play, managed to win 22 and draw one of 29 matches over the two nations. The Lions won the opening four fixtures before losing to Otago and Southland, but succeeded in holding New Zealand to a 9–9 draw. The Lions performed well in the remaining All Black tests though they lost all three, the team did not lose another non-test in the New Zealand leg of the tour. The Lions won all their games in Australia except for their final fixture against a New South Wales XV in Newcastle. They won both tests against Australia, in Brisbane, Queensland and in Sydney.

In 1955 the Lions toured South Africa and left with another imposing record, one draw and 19 wins from the 25 fixtures. The four-test series against South Africa, a thrilling affair, ended in a drawn series.

The 1959 tour to Australia and New Zealand marked once again a very successful tour for the Lions, who only lost six of their 35 fixtures. The Lions easily won both tests against Australia and lost the first three tests against New Zealand, but did find victory (9–6) in the final test.

After the glittering decade of the 1950s, the first tour of the 1960s proved not nearly as successful as previous ones. The 1962 tour to South Africa saw the Lions still win 16 of their 25 games, but did not fare well against the Springboks, losing three of the four tests. For the 1966 tour to Australia and New Zealand John Robins became the first Lions coach, and the trip started off very well for the Lions, who stormed through Australia, winning five non-tests and drawing one, and defeating Australia in two tests. The Lions experienced mixed results during the New Zealand leg of the tour, as well as losing all of the tests against New Zealand. The Lions also played a test against Canada on their way home, winning 19 to 8 in Toronto. The 1968 tour of South Africa saw the Lions win 15 of their 16 provincial matches, but the team actually lost three tests against the Springboks and drew one.

=== 1970–1979 ===
The 1970s saw a renaissance for the Lions. The 1971 British Lions tour to New Zealand and Australia, centred around the skilled Welsh half-back pairing of Gareth Edwards and Barry John, secured a series win over New Zealand. The tour started with a loss to Queensland but proceeded to storm through the next provincial fixtures, winning 11 games in a row. The Lions then went on to defeat New Zealand in Dunedin. The Lions only lost one match on the rest of the tour and won the test series against New Zealand, winning and drawing the last two games, to take the series two wins to one.

The 1974 British Lions tour to South Africa was one of the best-known and most successful Lions teams. Apartheid concerns meant some players declined the tour. Nonetheless, led by the esteemed Irish forward Willie John McBride, the tour went through 22 games unbeaten and triumphed 3–0 (with one drawn) in the test series. The series featured a lot of violence. The management of the Lions concluded that the Springboks dominated their opponents with physical aggression. At that time, test match referees came from the home nation, substitutions took place only if a doctor found a player unable to continue and there were no video cameras or sideline officials to prevent violent play. The Lions decided "to get their retaliation in first" with the infamous "99 call". The Lions postulated that a South African referee would probably not send off all of the Lions if they all retaliated against "blatant thuggery". Famous video footage of the 'battle of Boet Erasmus Stadium' shows J. P. R. Williams running over half of the pitch and launching himself at Van Heerden after such a call.

The 1977 British Lions tour to New Zealand saw the Lions drop only one non-test out of 21 games, a loss to a Universities side. The team did not win the test series though, winning one game but losing the other three.

In August 1977 the British Lions made a stopover in Fiji on the way home from their tour of New Zealand. Fiji beat them 25–21 at Buckhurst Park, Suva.

=== 1980–1989 ===
The Lions toured South Africa in 1980, and completed a flawless non-test record, winning 14 out of 14 matches. The Lions lost the first three tests to South Africa, only winning the last one once the Springboks were guaranteed to win the series.

The 1983 tour to New Zealand saw the team successful in the non-test games, winning all but two games, but being whitewashed in the test series against New Zealand.

A tour to South Africa by the Lions was anticipated in 1986, but the invitation for the Lions to tour was never accepted because of controversy surrounding Apartheid and the tour did not go ahead. The Lions did not return to South Africa until 1997, after the Apartheid era. A Lions team was selected in April 1986 for the International Rugby Board centenary match against 'The Rest'. The team was organised by the Four Home Unions Committee and the players were given the status of official British Lions.

The Lions tour to Australia in 1989 was a shorter affair, being only 12 matches in total. The tour was very successful for the Lions, who won all eight non-test matches and won the test series against Australia, two to one.

=== 1990–1999 ===
The tour to New Zealand in 1993 was the last of the amateur era. The Lions won six and lost four non-test matches, and lost the test series 2–1. The tour to South Africa in 1997 was a success for the Lions, who completed the tour with only two losses, and won the test series 2–1.

=== 2000–2009 ===
The British & Irish Lions against New Zealand in 2005

In 2001, the ten-game tour to Australia saw the Wallabies win the test series 2–1. This series saw the first award of the Tom Richards Trophy. In the Lions' 2005 tour to New Zealand, coached by Clive Woodward, the Lions won seven games against provincial teams, were defeated by the New Zealand Maori team, and suffered heavy defeats in all three tests.

In 2009, the Lions toured South Africa. There they faced the World Cup winners South Africa, with Ian McGeechan leading a coaching team including Warren Gatland, Shaun Edwards and Rob Howley. The Lions were captained by Irish lock Paul O'Connell. The initial Lions selection consisted of fourteen Irish players, thirteen Welsh, eight English and two Scots in the 37-man squad. In the first Test on 20 June, they lost 26–21, and lost the series in the second 28–25 in a tightly fought game at Loftus Versfeld on 27 June. The Lions won the third Test 28–9 at Ellis Park, and the series finished 2–1 to South Africa.

=== 2010–2019 ===
During June 2013 the British & Irish Lions toured Australia. Former Scotland and Lions full-back Andy Irvine was appointed as tour manager in 2010. Wales head coach Warren Gatland was the Lions' head coach, and their tour captain was Sam Warburton. The tour started in Hong Kong with a match against the Barbarians before moving on to Australia for the main tour featuring six provincial matches and three tests. The Lions won all but one non-test matches, losing to the Brumbies 14–12 on 18 June. The first test was followed shortly after this, which saw the Lions go 1-up over Australia winning 23–21. Australia did have a chance to take the win in the final moments of the game, but a missed penalty by Kurtley Beale saw the Lions take the win. The Wallabies drew the series in the second test winning 16–15, though the Lions had a chance to steal the win had it not been because of a missed penalty by Leigh Halfpenny. With tour captain Warburton out of the final test due to injury, Alun Wyn Jones took over the captaincy in the final test in Sydney. The final test was won by the Lions in what was a record win, winning 41–16 to earn their first series win since 1997 and their first over Australia since 1989.

Following his winning tour of Australia in 2013, Warren Gatland was reappointed as Lions Head Coach for the tour to New Zealand in June and July 2017. In April 2016, it was announced that the side would again be captained again by Sam Warburton. The touring schedule included 10 games: an opening game against the Provincial Barbarians, challenge matches against all five of New Zealand's Super Rugby sides, a match against the Māori All Blacks and three tests against New Zealand. The Lions defeated the Provincial Barbarians in the first game of the tour, before being beaten by the Blues three days later. The team recovered to beat the Crusaders but this was followed up with another midweek loss, this time against the Highlanders. The Lions then faced the Māori All Blacks, winning comfortably to restore optimism and followed up with their first midweek victory of the tour against the Chiefs. On 24 June, the Lions, captained by Peter O'Mahony, faced New Zealand in Eden Park in the first Test and were beaten 30–15. This was followed by the final midweek game of the tour, a draw against the Hurricanes. For the second Test, Gatland recalled Warburton to the starting team as captain. In Wellington Regional Stadium, the Lions beat a 14-man New Zealand side 24–21 after Sonny Bill Williams was red-carded at the 24-minute mark after a shoulder charge on Anthony Watson. This tied the series going into the final game, ending the side's 47-game winning run at home. In the final test at Eden Park the following week, the teams were tied at 15 points apiece with 78 minutes gone. Romain Poite signaled a penalty to New Zealand for an offside infringement after Ken Owens received the ball in front of his teammate Liam Williams, giving New Zealand the opportunity to kick for goal and potentially win the series. Poite, however, decided to downgrade the penalty to a free-kick after discussing with assistant referee Jérôme Garcès and Lions captain Sam Warburton. The match finished as a draw and the series was tied.

=== 2020–present ===
Warren Gatland was Lions head coach again for the tour to South Africa in 2021. In December 2019, the Lions' Test venues were announced, but the tour was significantly disrupted by the COVID-19 pandemic, and all the games were played behind closed doors. South Africa won the test series by two games to one. In the deciding third test, Morne Steyn again kicked a late penalty to win the series.

In 2021, a new Lions Series trophy was introduced before the Lions' tour to South Africa. The new trophy was manufactured from sterling silver in Thomas Lyte's London workshops, and stands at 60cm tall and 6½kg weight. The Lions Series Logo features on the main body of the trophy.

In 2024, it was announced that Andy Farrell would succeed Gatland as the Lions head coach. A women's Lions team was established in 2024, with their inaugural tour to New Zealand to take place in 2027. For the 2025 tour to Australia, the first test match saw Ireland equal their record for most starters with 8 while Wales did not have a player in the matchday squad for the first time since 1896. They went on to win the first test 27–19 and clinched a series a victory in the second test winning 26–29, after recovering from 23–5 deficit.

The 2029 men's tour will take place in New Zealand, two years after the inaugural women's tour.

== Overall test match record ==
As of 3 August 2025.

Team	Played	Won	Lost	Drawn	For	Against	Diff.	Win%
ANZAC XV	1	1	0	0	19	15	+4	100%
Argentina	8	6	1	1	260	59	+201	75%
Australia	26	19	7	0	482	315	+167	73.08%
Brazil	1	1	0	0	82	0	+82	100%
Canada	1	1	0	0	19	8	+11	100%
Ceylon	2	2	0	0	89	6	+83	100%
(East Africa Protectorate) East Africa	2	2	0	0	89	12	+77	100%
Fiji	1	0	1	0	21	25	–4	0%
France	1	1	0	0	29	27	+2	100%
Japan	1	1	0	0	28	10	+18	100%
New Zealand	41	7	30	4	399	700	–301	17.07%
(European Union) Rest of Europe XV	1	1	0	0	43	18	+25	100%
Rhodesia/Southern Rhodesia	9	9	0	0	265	83	+182	100%
South Africa	49	18	25	6	554	636	–82	36.73%
South West Africa	4	4	0	0	69	22	+47	100%
The Rest	1	0	1	0	7	15	–8	0%
Total	146	72	63	11	2,337	1,901	+436	49.32%

Overall test series results

As of 26 July 2025.

Team	Tours	Won	Lost	Drawn	W%
Argentina	3	3	0	0	100%
Australia	10	8	2	0	80%
New Zealand	12	1	10	1	8.33%
South Africa	14	4	9	1	28.57%
Total	39	16	21	2	41.03%

== Tours ==
=== Format ===
The Lions now regularly tour three Southern Hemisphere countries; Australia, South Africa and New Zealand. They also toured Argentina three times before the Second World War. Since 1989 tours have been held every four years. The most recent tour was to Australia in 2025.

In a break with tradition, the 2005 tour of New Zealand was preceded by a "home" fixture against Argentina at the Millennium Stadium in Cardiff on 23 May 2005. It finished in a 25–25 draw. A similar fixture was held against Japan before the 2021 tour of South Africa at Murrayfield, with the Lions winning 28–10.

On tour, games take place against local provinces, clubs or representative sides as well as test matches against the host's national team.

The Lions and their predecessor teams have also played games against other nearby countries on tour. For example, they played Rhodesia (now Zimbabwe) in 1910, 1924, 1938, 1955, 1962, 1968 and 1974 during their tours to South Africa. They were also beaten by Fiji on their 1977 tour to New Zealand. In addition, they visited pre-independence Namibia (then South West Africa), in 1955, 1962, 1968 and 1974.

There have also been games in other countries on the way home. These include games in Canada in 1959 and 1966, East Africa (then mostly Kenya, and held in Nairobi), and an unofficial game against Ceylon (now Sri Lanka) in 1950.

Year	Host nation(s)	Captain(s)	Head coach(es)	Top test scorer(s)	Test series result	Test record
1888	New Zealand; Australia	(England) Robert Seddon (England) Andrew Stoddart	(England) Alfred Shaw (England) Arthur Shrewsbury	No test matches played during 1888 tour		
1891	South Africa	(Scotland) Bill Maclagan	(England) Edwin Ash	(England) Arthur Rotherham, 4	Won	3–0
1896	South Africa	(England) Johnny Hammond (Ireland) Thomas Crean	(England) Roger Walker	(England) J. F. Byrne, 12	Won	3–1
1899	Australia	(England) Matthew Mullineux (England) Frank Stout	(England) Matthew Mullineux	(England) Charlie Adamson, 17	Won	3–1
1903	South Africa	(Scotland) Mark Morrison	(England) Johnny Hammond	(Scotland) John Gillespie, 4	Lost	0–1–2
1904	Australia; New Zealand	(Scotland) David Bedell-Sivright (Wales) Teddy Morgan	(New Zealand) Arthur O'Brien	(Wales) Percy Bush, 20	Won; Lost	3–0 (Australia); 0–1 (New Zealand)
1908	New Zealand; Australia	(Wales) Arthur Harding	(England) George Harnett	(Wales) Reggie Gibbs, 3 (Wales) Jack Jones, 3	Lost	0–2–1 (NZ); No tests vs Australia
1910	South Africa	(Ireland) Tommy Smyth (Wales) Jack Jones	(England) William Cail (Wales) Walter E. Rees	(England) Jack Spoors, 9	Lost	1–2
1910	Argentina	(England) John Raphael	(England) R.V. Stanley	(England) Harold Monks, 10 (no test caps awarded)	Won	1–0
1924	South Africa	(England) Ronald Cove-Smith	(Wales) Harry Packer	(England) Tom Voyce, 6	Lost	0–3–1
1927	Argentina	(Scotland) David MacMyn	(England) James Baxter	(England) Ernie Hammett, 40 (no test caps awarded)	Won	4–0
1930	New Zealand; Australia	(England) Doug Prentice (England) Carl Aarvold	(England) James Baxter	(England) Carl Aarvold, 9	Lost; Lost	1–3 (New Zealand); 0–1 (Australia)
1936	Argentina	(England) Bernard Gadney	(England) Doug Prentice	(England) John Brett, 7 (no test caps awarded)	Won	1–0
1938	South Africa	(Ireland) Sam Walker	(England) Major B.C. Hartley	(Wales) Vivian Jenkins, 9	Lost	1–2
1950	New Zealand; Australia	(Ireland) Karl Mullen (Wales) Bleddyn Williams	(England) Leslie B. Osborne	(Wales) Lewis Jones, 26	Lost; Won	0–3–1 (NZ); 2–0 (Australia)
1955	South Africa	(Ireland) Robin Thompson (Wales) Cliff Morgan	(Ireland) Jack Siggins	(England) Jeff Butterfield, 12	Tied	2–2
1959	Australia; New Zealand	(Ireland) Ronnie Dawson	(Ireland) O. B. Glasgow	(Ireland) David Hewitt, 16	Won; Lost	2–0 (Australia); 1–3 (New Zealand)
1962	South Africa	(Scotland) Arthur Smith (England) Dickie Jeeps	(Ireland) Harry McKibbin	(England) John Willcox, 5	Lost	0–3–1
1966	Australia; New Zealand	(Wales) David Watkins (Scotland) Mike Campbell-Lamerton	(Wales) John Robins	(Scotland) Stewart Wilson, 30	Won; Lost	2–0 (Australia); 0–4 (New Zealand)
1968	South Africa	(Ireland) Tom Kiernan	(Ireland) Ronnie Dawson	(Ireland) Tom Kiernan, 35	Lost	0–3–1
1971	New Zealand	(Wales) John Dawes	(Wales) Carwyn James	(Wales) Barry John, 30	Won	2–1–1
1974	South Africa	(Ireland) Willie John McBride	(Ireland) Syd Millar	(Wales) Phil Bennett, 26	Won	3–0–1
1977	New Zealand	(Wales) Phil Bennett	(Wales) John Dawes	(Wales) Phil Bennett, 18	Lost	1–3
1980	South Africa	(England) Bill Beaumont	(Ireland) Noel Murphy	(Ireland) Tony Ward, 18	Lost	1–3
1983	New Zealand	(Ireland) Ciaran Fitzgerald	(Scotland) Jim Telfer	(Ireland) Ollie Campbell, 15	Lost	0–4
1989	Australia	(Scotland) Finlay Calder	(Scotland) Ian McGeechan	(Scotland) Gavin Hastings, 28	Won	2–1
1993	New Zealand	(Scotland) Gavin Hastings	(Scotland) Ian McGeechan	(Scotland) Gavin Hastings, 38	Lost	1–2
1997	South Africa	(England) Martin Johnson	(Scotland) Ian McGeechan	(Wales) Neil Jenkins, 41	Won	2–1
2001	Australia	(England) Martin Johnson	(New Zealand) Graham Henry	(England) Jonny Wilkinson, 36	Lost	1–2
2005	New Zealand	(Ireland) Brian O'Driscoll (Wales) Gareth Thomas	(England) Clive Woodward	(Wales) Stephen Jones, 14	Lost	0–3
2009	South Africa	(Ireland) Paul O'Connell	(Scotland) Ian McGeechan	(Wales) Stephen Jones, 39	Lost	1–2
2013	Australia	(Wales) Sam Warburton (Wales) Alun Wyn Jones	(New Zealand) Warren Gatland	(Wales) Leigh Halfpenny, 49	Won	2–1
2017	New Zealand	(Wales) Sam Warburton (Ireland) Peter O'Mahony	(New Zealand) Warren Gatland	(England) Owen Farrell, 31	Tied	1–1–1
2021	South Africa	(Wales) Alun Wyn Jones	(New Zealand) Warren Gatland	(Wales) Dan Biggar, 23	Lost	1–2
2025	Australia	(England) Maro Itoje	(England) Andy Farrell	(Scotland) Finn Russell, 15	Won	2–1
2029	New Zealand	[[ ]]	[[ ]]	[[ ]]		–

=== Lions non-tour and home matches ===
The Lions have played a number of other matches against international opposition. With the exception of the matches against Argentina in 2005 and 2025, and Japan in 2021, which were preparation matches for Lions tours, these matches have been one-offs to mark special occasions.

The Lions played an unofficial international match in 1955 at Cardiff Arms Park against a Welsh XV to mark the 75th anniversary of the Welsh Rugby Union. The Lions won 20–17 but did not include all the big names of the 1955 tour, such as Tony O'Reilly, Jeff Butterfield, Phil Davies, Dickie Jeeps, Bryn Meredith and Jim Greenwood.

In 1977, the Lions played their first official home game, against the Barbarians as a charity fund-raiser held as part of the Queen's silver jubilee celebrations. The Barbarians line-up featured J. P. R. Williams, Gerald Davies, Gareth Edwards, Jean-Pierre Rives and Jean-Claude Skrela. The Lions included 13 of the team who played in the fourth test against New Zealand three weeks before and won 23–14.

In 1986, the Lions' planned tour to South Africa was cancelled for political reasons, because of Apartheid in South Africa. A match was organised against The Rest as a celebration to mark the International Rugby Board's centenary. The Lions lost 15–7.

In 1989, the Lions played against France in Paris. The game formed part of the celebrations of the bi-centennial of the French Revolution. The Lions, captained by Rob Andrew, won 29–27.

In 1990, a Four Home Unions team played against the Rest of Europe in a match to raise money for the rebuilding of Romania following the overthrow of Nicolae Ceaușescu in December 1989. The team used the Lions' logo, while the Rest of Europe played under the symbol of the Romanian Rugby Federation.

== Player records ==
Players in bold are still active at international level.
Only matches against full international sides are listed.

=== Most caps ===
Updated 2 August 2025

Rank	Name	Tours	Caps	Position
1	(Ireland) Willie John McBride	1962–1974	17	Lock
2	(England) Dickie Jeeps	1955–1962	13	Scrum-half
3	(Ireland) Mike Gibson	1966–1971	12	Centre
3	(Wales) Graham Price	1977–1983	12	Prop
3	(Wales) Alun Wyn Jones	2009–2021	12	Lock
6	(Wales) R. H. Williams	1955–1959	10	Lock
6	(Ireland) Tony O'Reilly	1955–1959	10	Wing
6	(Wales) Gareth Edwards	1968–1974	10	Scrum-half
9	(Ireland) Syd Millar	1959–1968	9	Prop
9	(Scotland) Andy Irvine	1974–1980	9	Full-back
9	(England) Mako Vunipola	2013–2021	9	Prop
9	(Ireland) **Tadhg Furlong**	2017–2025	9	Prop
9	(England) **Maro Itoje**	2017–2025	9	Lock

=== Most points ===
Updated 2 August 2025

Rank	Name	Tours	Points	Caps	PPG	Position
1	(Scotland) Gavin Hastings	1986–1993	69	7	9.85	Full-back
2	(England) Jonny Wilkinson	2001–2005	67	6	11.16	Fly-half
3	(Wales) Stephen Jones	2005–2009	53	6	8.83	Fly-half
4	(Wales) Leigh Halfpenny	2013–2017	49	4	12.25	Full-back
5	(Wales) Phil Bennett	1974–1977	44	8	5.50	Fly-half
6	(Wales) Neil Jenkins	1997–2001	41	4	10.25	Fly-half
7	(Ireland) Tom Kiernan	1962–1968	35	5	7.00	Full-back
8	(England) **Owen Farrell**	2013–2025	34	8	4.25	Fly-half
9	(Scotland) Stewart Wilson	1966	30	5	6.00	Full-back
9	(Wales) Barry John	1968–1971	30	5	6.00	Fly-half

=== Most tries ===
Updated 2 August 2025

Rank	Name	Tours	Tries	Caps	TPG	Position
1	(Ireland) Tony O'Reilly	1955–1959	6	10	0.60	Wing
2	(Wales) J. J. Williams	1974–1977	5	7	0.71	Wing
3	(Wales) Willie Llewellyn	1904	4	4	1.00	Wing
3	(Wales) Malcolm Price	1959	4	6	0.66	Centre
4	(Scotland) Alf Bucher	1899	3	3	1.00	Wing
4	(England) Jack Spoors	1910	3	3	1.00	Full-back
4	(England) Carl Aarvold	1930	3	5	0.60	Centre
4	(England) Jeff Butterfield	1955	3	4	0.75	Centre
4	(Wales) Ken Jones	1962–1966	3	6	0.50	Centre
4	(Wales) Gerald Davies	1968–1971	3	5	0.60	Wing

=== Player of the Series ===
The following players have been voted as the British & Irish Lions Player of the Series since 2009, based on their performances in the test series of each tour:

Tour	Players' Player of the Series	Fans' Player of the Series	Ref(s)
2009	(Wales) Jamie Roberts	Not awarded	
2013	(Wales) Leigh Halfpenny	Not awarded	
2017	(Wales) Jonathan Davies	Not awarded	
2021	(England) **Maro Itoje**	Not awarded	
2025	(Ireland) **Tadhg Beirne**	(Scotland) **Finn Russell**	

== See also ==
- List of British & Irish Lions international matches
- Rugby union and apartheid
- Rugby union in the British Isles

== Bibliography ==
- Godwin, Terry; Rhys, Chris (1981). The Guinness Book of Rugby Facts & Feats. London: Guinness Superlatives. ISBN 0-85112-214-0.
- Griffiths, John (1987). The Phoenix Book of International Rugby Records. London: Phoenix House. ISBN 0-460-07003-7.
- Bath, Richard (2008). The British & Irish Lions Miscellany. London: Vision Sports Publishing.
