= Alan Robson (rugby union) =

England international rugby union player

- Born: 3 May 1893 Wishaw, Scotland
- Died: 3 August 1981 (aged 88) Billericay, Essex, England

Rugby union career
- Position: Hooker
International career
Years	Team	Apps	(Points)
1924–26	England	5	(0)

Alan Robson (3 May 1893 – 3 August 1981) was an English international rugby union player.

Born in Wishaw, Scotland, Robson served during World War I and suffered such serious injuries on the battlefield that he had been assumed to be dead. He recovered after undergoing surgery and had a metal plate inserted in his head.

Robson's sister was married to England international Herbert Whitley.

A stocky hooker, Robson played his rugby with Newcastle-based club Northern and was a regular in Northumberland representative sides from the 1920–21 season. In 1924, Robson was the England hooker in all four matches of their grand slam-winning Five Nations campaign. He was then expected to tour South Africa with the 1924 British Lions, but had to make himself unavailable when he received head and leg injuries in a car accident.

== See also ==
- List of England national rugby union players
