= Jim McVicker =

Rugby union player from Northern Ireland

- Full name: James McVicker
- Born: 1 October 1896 Ballymoney, County Antrim; Northern Ireland
- Died: 18 December 1985 (aged 89) Ballymoney, County Antrim; Northern Ireland
- Notable relative(s): Hugh McVicker (brother); Sam McVicker (brother)
- Occupation: Medical practitioner

Rugby union career
- Position: Lock
International career
Years	Team	Apps	(Points)
1924–30	Ireland	20	(0)
1924	British Lions	3	(0)

James McVicker (1 October 1896 — 18 December 1985) was an Ireland rugby union international from Northern Ireland.

A native of Ballymoney, McVicker was a Collegians and Ulster forward, capped 20 times by Ireland from his debut as a 27-year old in 1924. He featured in two Tests on the 1924 tour to South Africa with the British Lions and continued in the Ireland team until 1930, playing mostly as a lock. Two brothers, Hugh and Sam, who were also capped for Ireland.

McVicker practiced medicine in Moss-side, County Antrim, before retiring in 1963.

His daughter Moyra and granddaughter Lynsey were Ireland hockey internationals.

== See also ==
- List of Ireland national rugby union players
