= Harry Phillips (rugby union) =

Wales international rugby union footballer

- Born: Henry Thomas Phillips; 22 June 1903 Crosskeys, Caerphilly County Borough, Wales
- Died: 16 December 1978 (aged 75) Newport, Wales
- Occupation(s): Collier; Police officer

Rugby union career
- Position: Lock
Amateur team(s)
Years	Team	Apps	(Points)
–	Cross Keys RFC		
1923–1931	Newport RFC		
International career
Years	Team	Apps	(Points)
1927–1928	Wales	9	(0)

Henry Thomas Phillips (22 June 1903 – 16 December 1978) was a Welsh international rugby union lock who played club rugby for Cross Keys and Newport and international rugby for Wales. Phillips was a collier by profession before becoming a police officer, and was the nephew of former international Wales player Harry Day.

== Rugby career ==
Phillips was born in Crosskeys, and began his rugby career with local team Cross Keys RFC, before moving to first class team Newport. He played rugby with Newport from 1923, and was given various roles within the pack, though he played mainly second row and prop. In 1926, Phillips faced his first international opposition when he was part of the Newport team that played the touring Māoris. The game ended in a 0–0 draw, a score which the Māori captain, Wattie Barclay, believed his team was fortunate to achieve.

In 1927, Phillips was given his first international call-up, when he was selected for the opening game of the 1927 Five Nations Championship. Under the captaincy of Bernard Turnbull, Phillips' debut was against England at Twickenham which Wales lost 9–11. Phillips played in all the matches of the 1927 Championship which saw poor Welsh results, with only a single win, over France. Despite the poor run of results, Phillips was reselected for the Wales game against the New South Wales Waratahs, who he had faced just a month earlier with Newport. The Wales team included eight new caps, which the far tighter Waratahs were able to defeat, finishing the match 18–8 winners.

Phillips played in all four games of the 1928 Championship, which was as miserable a campaign as 1927. The Welsh won just once, the first ever victory over Scotland at Murrayfield. Although a historic win, this was the start of a poor run of results for Scotland who finished the tournament with just a single win too. Worse for Wales was the loss to France. Wales had beaten France in the previous twelve encounters, and this was the first time Wales had lost to the French team. This final game of the tournament saw five Welsh players represent Wales for the last time, Phillips was one of them.

Phillips continued representing Newport after the end of his international career, and in the 1929/30 season he was given the captaincy of the Newport first team. He left Newport in 1931.

=== International matches played ===
Wales (rugby union)

- England 1927, 1928
- France 1927, 1928
- Ireland 1927, 1928
- (Australia) New South Wales Waratahs 1927
- Scotland 1927, 1928

== Bibliography ==
- Billot, John (1972). All Blacks in Wales. Ferndale, Glamorgan: Ron Jones Publications.
- Godwin, Terry (1984). The International Rugby Championship 1883–1983. Grafton Street, London: Willow Books. ISBN 0-00-218060-X.
- Smith, David; Williams, Gareth (1980). Fields of Praise: The Official History of The Welsh Rugby Union. Cardiff: University of Wales Press. ISBN 0-7083-0766-3.

Rugby Union Captain
Preceded by Vince Griffiths	Newport RFC captain 1929–1930	Succeeded by Bill Everson
