= Neil McPherson =

Neil McPherson may refer to:

- Neil McPherson (artistic director) (born 1969), theatre producer and artistic director
- Neil McPherson (rugby union) (1892–1957), Welsh rugby union player who represented Scotland and the British Lions
