= William Roche (rugby union) =

Irish rugby union player

- Born: William Joseph Roche; 28 March 1895 Limerick; Ireland
- Died: 26 June 1983 (aged 88) Bandon, County Cork; Ireland
- University: University College Cork

Rugby union career
- Position: Number 8
Senior career
Years	Team	Apps	(Points)
19xx-19xx	University College Cork		
1920-1927	Newport		
Provincial / State sides
Years	Team	Apps	(Points)
- Munster
International career
Years	Team	Apps	(Points)
1920	Ireland	3	(3)
1924	British Lions	0	(0)

William Joseph Roche (28 March 1895 in Limerick, Ireland – 26 June 1983 in Bandon, County Cork, Ireland) was an Irish rugby union player who represented Munster, Ireland and the British Lions. He also played club rugby for both University College Cork and Newport.

== Club career ==
Between 1920 and 1927 Roche played club rugby for Newport and was captain during the 1926-27 season. In 1926 he captained the club against the New Zealand Māoris in a game which ended in a 0-0 draw.

== Rugby international ==
=== Ireland ===
Roche won 3 caps for Ireland during the 1920 Five Nations Championship. He made his debut against England at Lansdowne Road on 14 February in a 14-11 defeat. He then played against Scotland on 28 February at Inverleith in a 19-0 defeat. He won his final cap against France on 3 April in a 15-7 defeat at Lansdowne. While playing for Ireland, his teammates included Ernie Crawford.

=== British Lions ===
Roche was also selected for the British Lions squad for their 1924 tour of South Africa. However he did not play in any of the Test matches against South Africa.

Rugby Union Captain
Preceded by Harold Davies	Newport RFC Captain; 1926-1927	Succeeded by Vince Griffiths
