= Sam McVicker =

Rugby union player from Northern Ireland

- Full name: Samuel McVicker
- Born: 12 December 1890 Moss-side, County Antrim, Ireland
- Died: 23 July 1972 (aged 81) Chatham, Kent, England
- Notable relative(s): Hugh McVicker (brother); Jim McVicker (brother)

Rugby union career
- Position: Second row
International career
| Years | Team | Apps | (Points) |
| 1922 | Ireland | 4 | (0) |

Samuel McVicker (12 December 1890 – 23 July 1972) was an Irish international rugby union player.

Born in Moss-side, County Antrim, McVicker was the eldest of three rugby playing brothers, who all played in the second row for Ireland in the 1920s. He gained his four caps in the 1922 Five Nations Championship.

McVicker also represented Ireland in field hockey.

After serving with 19th London Regiment during World War I, McVicker was ordained into the ministry in 1920 and from 1928 to 1956 was the senior minister of Carlisle Road Presbyterian Church in Derry.

== See also ==
- List of Ireland national rugby union players
