= Albert Owen (rugby union) =

- Full name: Albert David Owen
- Born: 31 July 1898 Gurnos Cross, Wales
- Died: 18 June 1964 (aged 65) Cimla, Neath, Wales
- Height: 5 ft 6 in (168 cm)
- Weight: 10.7 st (150 lb; 68 kg)

Rugby union career
- Position: Fly-half
International career
Years	Team	Apps	(Points)
1924	Wales	1	(3)

Albert David Owen (31 July 1898 – 18 June 1964) was a Welsh international rugby union player.

Originally from Ystalyfera RFC, Owen debuted for Swansea in the 1923–24 season and developed into their regular outside–half, having previously been a centre three–quarter. He gained a Wales cap against England at Swansea in 1924, forming an all new halfback combination with Eddie Watkins. His performance was considered underwhelming in a Wales loss and he subsequently made way for Newport's Vince Griffiths.

== See also ==
- List of Wales national rugby union players
