= Douglas Marsden-Jones =

British Lions & Wales international rugby union player

- Born: Marsden Douglas Jones; 1893 Swansea, Wales
- Died: 5 January 1955 (aged 61–62) London, Wales
- School: Bishop Gore School
- University: University College Swansea

Rugby union career
- Position: Forward
Amateur team(s)
Years	Team	Apps	(Points)
1921-1922	Cardiff RFC		
–	London Welsh RFC		
–	Blackheath F.C.		
–	Barbarian F.C.		
International career
Years	Team	Apps	(Points)
1921-1924	Wales	2	(0)
1924	British Isles	2	(0)

Douglas Marsden-Jones CBE born Marsden Douglas Jones (1893 – 5 January 1955) was a Welsh international rugby union forward who played club rugby for Cardiff and London Welsh. Marsden-Jones was also a member of Ronald Cove-Smith's British Isles team that toured South Africa in 1924.

== Rugby career ==
Marsden-Jones was born in Swansea and played in his early life for University College, Swansea. He played just two games for Wales as a back row forward at No 8. The first was the opening game of the 1921 Five Nations Championship against England on 15 January. Marsden-Jones was one of seven new caps to play under the captaincy of Jack Wetter at Twickenham, and after a string of serious injuries, Wales lost the game 18–3. His second game would take over three years, when he was selected to face the touring New Zealand team in 1924. It was another heavy defeat for the Welsh side and Marsden-Jones was not selected again.

In 1924 Marsden-Jones was selected to tour South Africa with the British Isles team and played in two tests.

He continued his rugby career by captaining London Welsh for several seasons. He died in London in 1955.

=== International games played ===
Wales

- England 1921
- New Zealand 1924

British Isles

- South Africa 1924, 1924

== Personal life ==
During the First World War he fought in the British Army, serving in the Glamorganshire Yeomanry (1297), 210th Coy, Machine Gun Corps (74727) and the Tank Corps. He later worked as manager of the labour relations division of the Ford Motor Company. In 1938 as Director of Factories he was seconded to mobilise a workforce of 30,000 to staff the Ordnance Factories throughout the country. In 1952 he was nominated for the CBE by Winston Churchill for this major contribution to the war effort, which was presented by the Queen in her New Years Honours list.

== Bibliography ==
- Smith, David; Williams, Gareth (1980). Fields of Praise: The Official History of The Welsh Rugby Union. Cardiff: University of Wales Press. ISBN 0-7083-0766-3.
