= Tom Holliday (rugby) =

England dual-code rugby international footballer

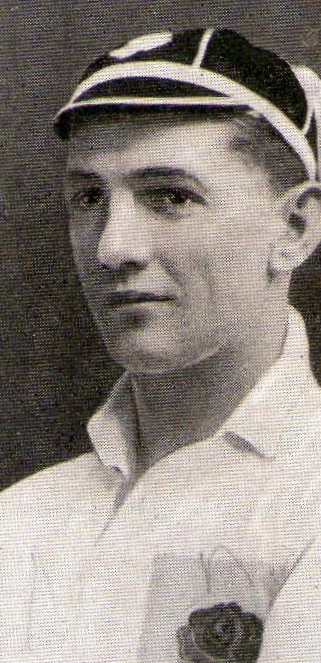

Personal information
- Full name: Thomas Edwin Holliday
- Born: 13 July 1898 Wigton, England
- Died: 19 July 1969 (aged 71) Carlisle, England

Playing information

Rugby union
- Position: Fullback
Club
Years	Team	Pld	T	G	FG	P
	Aspatria RUFC
Representative
Years	Team	Pld	T	G	FG	P
1920–≤26	Cumberland	36
1923–26	England	7	0	0	0	0
1924	British Lions	1	0	0	0	0

Rugby league
- Position: Fullback, Wing
Club
Years	Team	Pld	T	G	FG	P
1926–29	Oldham	83	33	0	0	99
Representative
Years	Team	Pld	T	G	FG	P
	Cumberland
1928	England	1	0	0	0	0

Thomas Edwin Holliday (13 July 1898 – 19 July 1969), also known as "Tom" or "Tosh", was an English rugby union, and professional rugby league footballer who played in the 1920s. He was a dual-code international, playing for the England national rugby union team, British Lions, and the England national rugby league team. His daughter is Helen Ann Holliday and his great grandson is Henry Gibbon

== Biography ==
Thomas Edwin Holliday, born 13 July 1898 in Wigton, the youngest of four brothers, two of which died in the Great War, came from a long line of Cumberland sporting personalities. He began his education at the local school before winning a scholarship to attend The Nelson Thomlinson School, Wigton. After the armistice he began playing rugby for his home town club, Aspatria RUFC. He received the first of his 36 Cumberland county caps playing against Cheshire in 1920. In 1921, he played fullback for the North in their annual game against the South. In 1923, he received the first of his seven international caps, playing against Scotland and France. In the same year he captained Aspatria when they defeated Silloth RFC to regain the Cumberland county cup. In 1924, he went on the British Lions' tour to South Africa but suffered a broken collar bone in the opening game and took no further part in the series. In 1925, he played in three of the four international matches, taking the field against Ireland, France and Scotland. In 1925, he played against France and Scotland. In 1924, he captained Cumberland when they won the County Championship, for the first and only time in their history, defeating Kent by six points to three in the final at Carlisle. He continued to captain the county side until 1926, when he accepted one of many offers to play Rugby league, signing professional forms for Oldham. In 1927, Oldham beat Swinton by 26 points to 7, in the first BBC broadcast Rugby League Challenge Cup final. Tosh scored three tries and became only the third man in the history of the final to achieve that recognition. F. W. (Basher) Ashworth, another native of Aspatria also played in that final. In 1996, Robbie Paul also joined that elite grouping, playing for Bradford Bulls when they defeated St. Helens. Tosh also gained an international cap for England playing against Wales in 1928. He retired from the game in 1931, when he returned to Aspatria to run a shop selling drapery and ironmongery. He died at Aspatria on 19 July 1969.

The eldest brother Jonathon (Jont) was a highly respected three-quarter back, won the first of his 32 county caps at the age of seventeen. He was a member of the Aspatria side that won the county cup in 1909, 1911 & 1912, and beaten finalists in 1908 and 1910. Perhaps his greatest achievement came in 1913, when he played in the county side narrowly beaten by Gloucestershire in the final of the county championship. On 18 November 1916, two individual telegrams arrived at the family home, regarding the disappearance of both Jont and his younger brother Alex, reports later substantiated.

== Rugby union ==
Holliday played at fullback for Aspatria RUFC. He also captained Cumberland in the English County Championship, against Kent in 1924.

He later played for England, on 17 March 1923 against Scotland at Inverleith. He was capped a further six times between then and 1926.

The following year, he went on the 1924 British Lions tour to South Africa, but was injured in the first match, and so was unable to play in the rest of the tour. He was not the only 1924 British Lion to switch to rugby league, Roy Kinnear also did so.

== Rugby league ==
At club level, he played for Oldham.

Holliday won a cap for England while at Oldham in 1928 against Wales.

== Contemporaneous article extract ==
"T. Holliday' Aspatria, Cumberland and England (Rugby Union.) Born in 1899 (sic "1898"), T. Holliday has played a great part in the post-war success of Cumberland in the County Championship. A tower of strength to the Aspatria Club, he gained an international cap for England in 1923, and he has since played eight (sic "seven") times for England. Primarily he is a full-back, but for his club and for his country he has frequently played with success in the centre (sic "only as a fullback for England"), and his sense of position has always stood him in good stead. He is a safe full-back, and although he does not have a kick of great length, he always makes sure of finding touch."

== Note ==
Although Holliday's nicknames were "Tom", or "Tosh", he is erroneously nicknamed "Toff" in some references.
