= Leonard Corbett =

English cricketer and rugby union footballer

- Born: Leonard James Corbett; 12 May 1897 Bristol, England
- Died: 26 January 1983 (aged 85) Taunton, Somerset

Rugby union career
- Position: Centre
International career
Years	Team	Apps	(Points)
1921–1927	England	16	(Pts:15; Tries:3; Pens:1)

Leonard Corbett (12 May 1897 – 26 January 1983) was a rugby union international who represented England from 1921 to 1927. He also captained his country. He was also a cricketer.

== Early life ==
Leonard Corbett was born on 12 May 1897 in Bristol.

== Rugby union career ==
Corbett made over 200 appearances for Bristol RFC, having also represented Fairfield School, Cotham Park RFC, Bristol Saracens & Gloucestershire.

Len made his international debut on 28 March 1921 at Colombes in the France vs England match. Of the matches he played for his national side he was captain on two occasions. He played his final match for England on 2 April 1927 at Colombes in the France vs England match.

Legend has it, that Len was the first rugby player to ever sell a dummy

== Cricket career ==
Corbett played 9 first-class matches for Gloucestershire, making his debut against Worcestershire in the 1920 County Championship. His final first-class match in 1925 came against Somerset. An irregular player for Gloucestershire during his playing career, Corbett scored 373 runs at a batting average of 20.72, with a single half century high score of 55, while in the field he took 9 catches.

Sporting positions
Preceded by William Wavell Wakefield	English National Rugby Union Captain; 1927	Succeeded by Ronald Cove-Smith
