= Michael Bradley (rugby union, born 1897) =

British Lions & Ireland international rugby union player

- Born: Michael James Bradley; 16 October 1897 Cork, Ireland
- Died: 14 July 1951 (aged 53)

Rugby union career
- Position: Prop
Amateur team(s)
Years	Team	Apps	(Points)
- Dolphin RFC
International career
Years	Team	Apps	(Points)
1920-1927	Ireland	19	(0)
1924	British and Irish Lions	0	(0)

Michael James Bradley (16 October 1897 – 14 July 1951) was an Irish rugby union player who played in the prop position. Bradley played club rugby with Dolphin RFC, was capped 19 times for Ireland, and was a member of the British Isles team that toured in 1924.

== International career ==
Bradley obtained his first cap for Ireland on 13 March 1920 against Wales. In 1924, he toured with a combined British Isles team in South Africa, and although didn't feature in any of the test matches, he played in a total of 13 games against other opposition during the tour. In 1926, Bradley played in all four Ireland matches during the Five Nations tournament where Ireland were joint champions. He also featured during two matches in Ireland's 1927 Five Nations tournament, where Ireland were again joint champions. His final appearance for Ireland came in that tournament against Wales on 12 March 1927.
