= Herbert Whitley (rugby union) =

British Lions & England international rugby union player

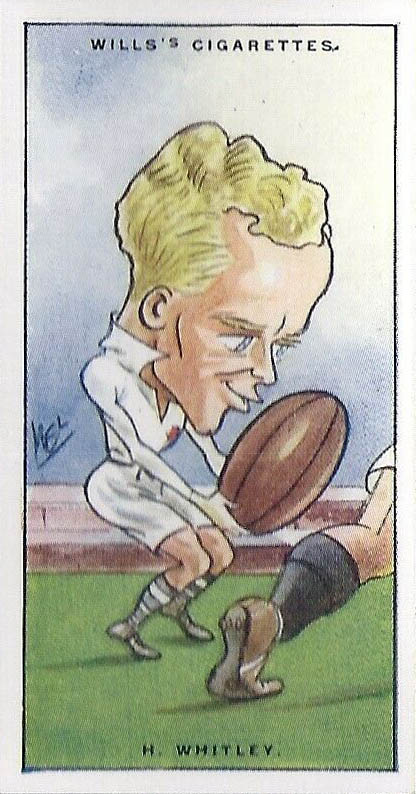
- Born: 26 August 1903 Morpeth, England
- Notable relative: Alan Robson (brother-in-law)

Rugby union career
- Position: Half-back
International career
Years	Team	Apps	(Points)
1924	British Lions	3	(0)
1929	England	1	(0)

Herbert Whitley was an English international rugby union player.

== Biography ==
Raised in Northumberland, Whitley was the son of a reverend who served as Rector of Whalton.

Whitley, a half-back, was considerably lightweight at around 60 kg. He had yet to represent England when he won a place on the 1924 British Lions tour to South Africa, where he played three of the four international matches against the Springboks. His solitary England cap came in a 1929 Five Nations win over Wales at Twickenham.

== See also ==
- List of England national rugby union players
- List of British & Irish Lions players
