= Māori All Blacks =

- Union: NZRU
- Emblem: Silver fern
- Coach: Tamati Ellison
- Captain: Billy Harmon/Rameka Poihipi
Team kit

First match
- Hawke's Bay 0–5 New Zealand Natives (23 June 1888)

Largest win
- British Columbia 3–111 New Zealand Māori (9 June 2004)

Largest defeat
- New Zealand Maoris 0–37 South Africa (25 August 1956)

Official website
- www.allblacks.com/teams/maori-all-blacks/

The Māori All Blacks, previously called the New Zealand Maori, New Zealand Maoris and New Zealand Natives, are a rugby union team from New Zealand. They are a representative team of the New Zealand Rugby Union, and a prerequisite for playing is that the player has Māori whakapapa (genealogy). Today all players have their ancestry verified before selection in the team.

The team's first match was in 1888 against Hawke's Bay. This was followed by a tour of Europe in 1888 and 1889 where the team played their first games against national teams, beating Ireland in Dublin before losing to Wales and England. Their early uniforms consisted of a black jersey with a silver fern and white knickerbockers. The New Zealand Māori perform a haka—a Māori challenge or posture dance—before each match. The haka was later adopted by the New Zealand national team, the All Blacks, as were their black shirts. In 2001, the Māori first performed the "Tīmatanga" haka, which describes the evolution of life and the creation of New Zealand from the four winds.

Since being given official status in 1910, the New Zealand Māori have selected some of rugby union's great players, including fullback George Nēpia who played 46 games for New Zealand from 1924 to 1930, halfback Sid Going who played 86 matches for his country and former New Zealand captain Tane Norton, who represented New Zealand in 61 games, including 27 tests, and later became president of the New Zealand Rugby Union.

== History ==
=== Beginning ===
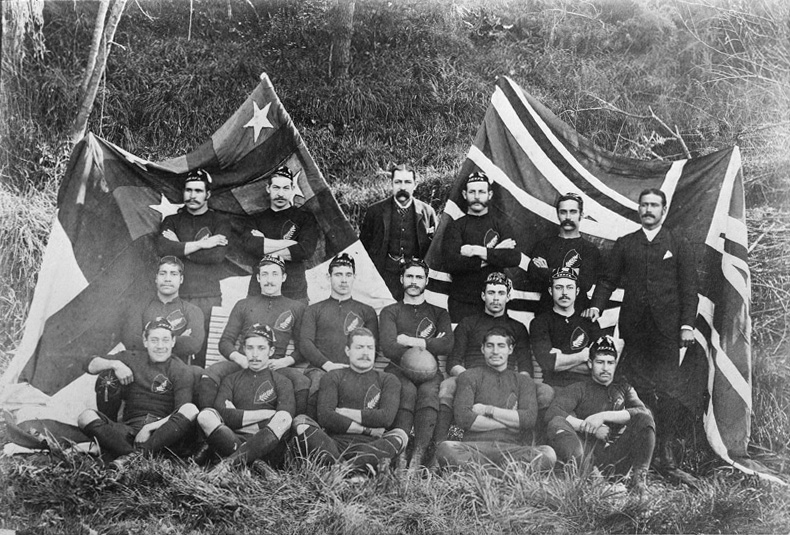
The New Zealand Natives' football team prior to playing Queensland in July 1889

The 1888–1889 New Zealand Native football team organised by Joseph Warbrick toured New Zealand, Australia, England, Ireland, Scotland and Wales. The team became the first New Zealand side to perform a haka during its match v Surrey, and also the first to wear an all black uniform. It was a wholly private endeavour, not organised by the NZRU.

The first New Zealand Māori team given official status was selected in 1910. That year the team toured New Zealand and Australia, playing a range of combined New Zealand provinces and Australian state teams. An American Universities squad was touring Australia at the same time and two fixtures were against the New Zealand Maoris. Both were played at Sydney and were won by the New Zealanders 14–11 and 21–3 respectively. In their 19 total matches played they won 12, drew 3 and lost 4 games.

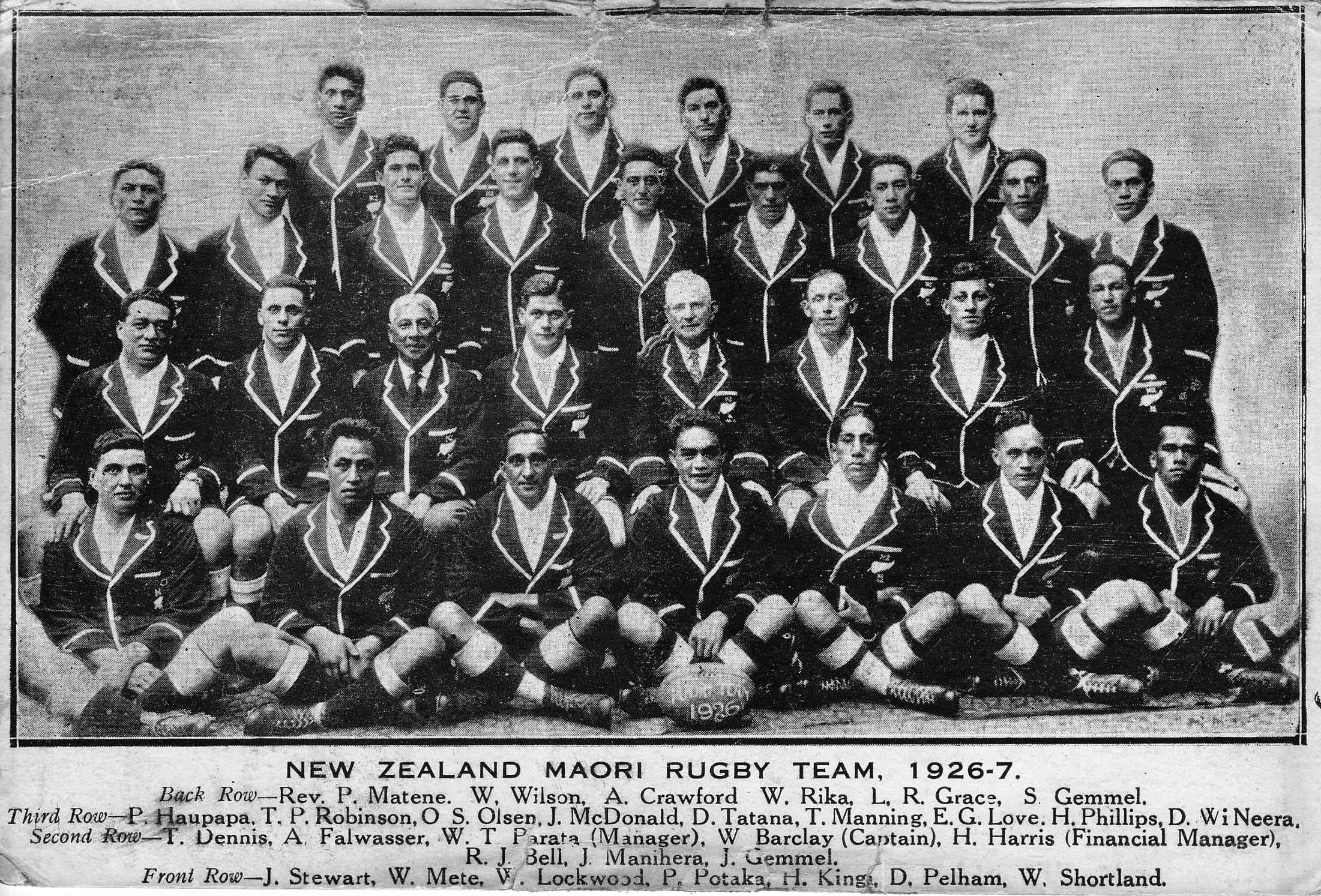
The team that toured to Europe in 1926–27

The New Zealand Maoris had not played a match outside New Zealand or Australia until 1926, when they undertook a European tour of France, England and Wales. They also played two games in New Zealand before they left, two more in Australia on the way, and also stopped in Sri Lanka for one game before travelling to France to start the European fixtures. On the return to New Zealand they stopped in Victoria, Australia for a final game in which they won 41–3. In all there were 40 games played. The New Zealand Maoris won 30 of those, drew 2 and lost 8. Full-back George Nēpia remains the most notable player of that period.

=== Māori players and South Africa ===
New Zealand has a long history of sporting contact with South Africa, especially in rugby union. Until the 1970s, this involved discrimination against Māori players, since the segregationist laws in South Africa for most of the twentieth century did not allow people of different races to play sport together. South African officials requested that Māori players not be included in teams which toured the country. Despite some of New Zealand's best players being Māori, this was agreed to, and Māori players were excluded from the first three tours of South Africa by New Zealand, in 1928, 1949 and 1960.

Nonetheless, in the early period of apartheid, during their 1956 tour South Africa did play the Māori in New Zealand. In April 2010 Muru Walters said that in 1956 Ernest Corbett, Minister of Māori Affairs, had told the team to deliberately lose to the Springboks "for the future of rugby". The Māori lost 37–0. This was followed by Walters calling for the New Zealand government to apologise for the way it treated Māori rugby players.

=== Professional era ===
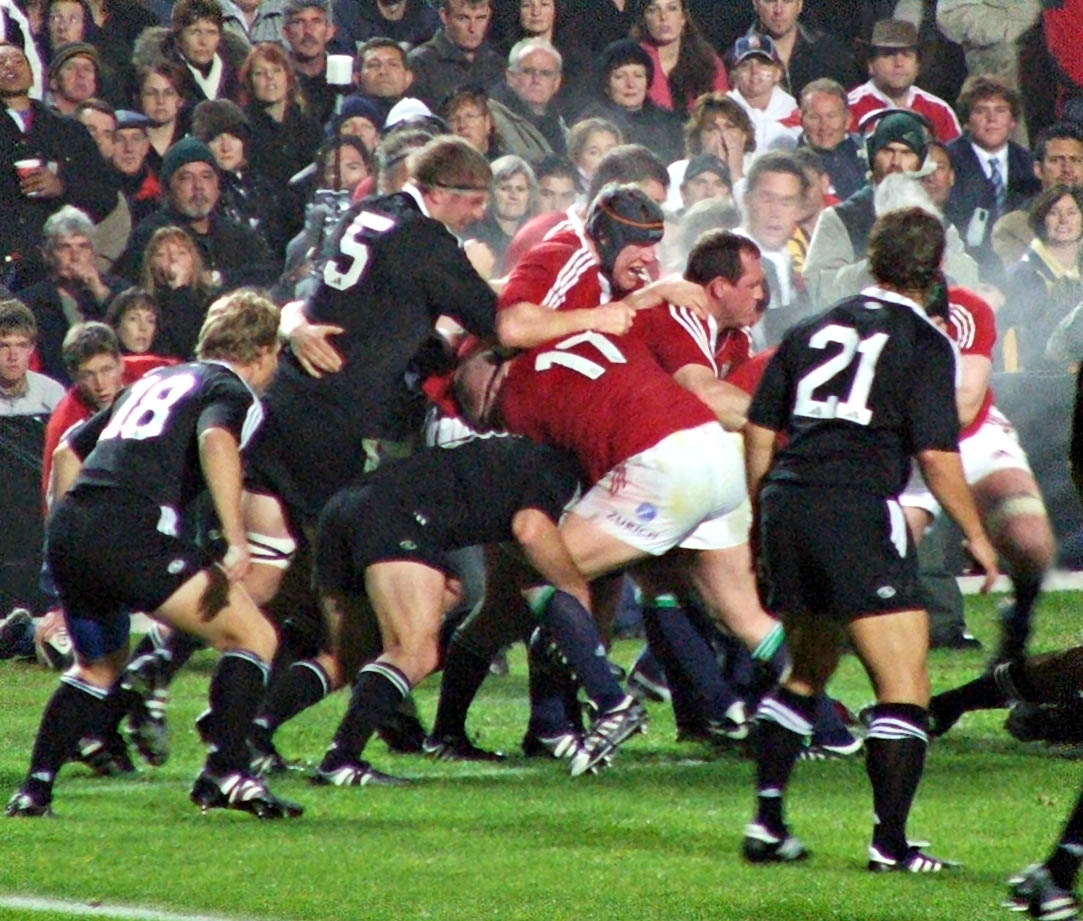
British & Irish Lions playing the New Zealand Maori in 2005

The professional era in rugby union began in 1995. The team lost only four of its 26 games played between 1994 and 2004, including beating England, Argentina, Scotland and Fiji. The Māori continued their winning form in 2004 beating the England Saxons in extra time in the final of the Churchill Cup in Canada.

One of their two annual tournaments is the Pacific Nations Cup, a competition involving the Pacific top national teams. From 2008 they replaced the Junior All Blacks, and they were undefeated champions, narrowly beating Australia A in the final game of the tournament. The Churchill Cup was another, which they won in 2004 and in 2006, defeating Ireland A and the USA in pool play in Santa Clara, California and Scotland A in the final in Edmonton, Alberta.

In 2005 the Māori beat the British & Irish Lions for the first time in an official match. Their preparations for this match caused them to withdraw from the 2005 Churchill Cup. In August 2012, the NZRU announced the Māori All Blacks would play three matches in the United Kingdom, including a fixture against Canada. Jamie Joseph was coach with assistance from Daryl Gibson.

In matches in New Zealand in 2010 to mark one hundred years of the team, they defeated Ireland and England.

The team was renamed the Māori All Blacks in 2012, having previously been called the New Zealand Maori and New Zealand Maoris. Many members have gone on to play for New Zealand.

== Haka ==
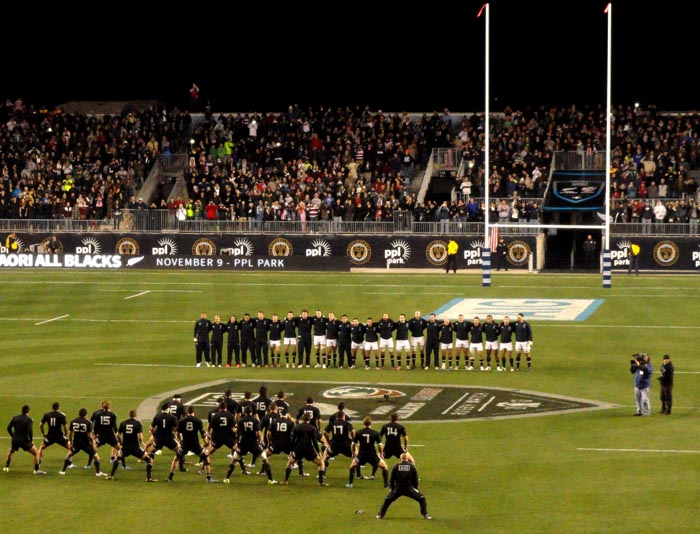
Performing the haka prior to their match against the United States in 2013

One of the New Zealand Natives' legacies was the haka, a traditional Māori posture dance with vigorous movements and stamping of the feet, to the accompaniment of rhythmically shouted words; this was first performed during a match on 3 October 1888 against Surrey in England, United Kingdom. The haka was later adopted by the New Zealand national team, the All Blacks.

In 2001, the team first performed the Tīmatanga haka, which describes the evolution of life and the creation of New Zealand from the four winds. This was written especially for the New Zealand Maori team by team kaumātua (elder) Whetu Tipiwai. It tells the Māori story of the creation from the void, the nothingness, the darkness to what we have today. It also tells of a gathering of young warriors, young chiefs, young rugby players who are making a statement and setting aims, objectives and strategies to achieve matauranga (knowledge), whanaunatanga (unity) and taumatatanga (excellence).

== Honours ==
- 2004 Churchill Cup champions
- 2006 Churchill Cup champions
- 2007 Churchill Cup finalists
- 2008 IRB Pacific Nations Cup champions

== Matches against international sides ==
New Zealand Māori matches against international sides, including the New Zealand Natives 1888 and 1889 tour. These results are only against full international sides, including the British & Irish Lions, but not against second national teams.

| Opposing Teams | For | Against | Result | Date | Venue | City | Competition |
|---|---|---|---|---|---|---|---|
| Ireland | 13 | 4 | Won | 1 December 1888 | Lansdowne Road | Dublin | New Zealand Natives tour to British Isles |
| Wales | 0 | 5 | Lost | 22 December 1888 | St. Helen's | Swansea | New Zealand Natives tour to British Isles |
| England | 0 | 7 | Lost | 16 February 1889 | Rectory Field | Blackheath | New Zealand Natives tour to British Isles |
| Australia | 12 | 6 | Won | 27 September 1913 | Alexandra Park | Auckland | Australia Tour Match |
| South Africa | 8 | 9 | Lost | 7 September 1921 | McLean Park | Napier | South Africa Tour Match |
| Australia | 25 | 22 | Won | 24 June 1922 | Royal Agricultural Showground | Sydney | Tour Match |
| Australia | 13 | 28 | Lost | 26 June 1922 | Royal Agricultural Showground | Sydney | Tour Match |
| Australia | 23 | 22 | Won | 8 July 1922 | Royal Agricultural Showground | Sydney | Tour Match |
| New Zealand | 14 | 21 | Lost | 19 August 1922 | Athletic Park | Wellington | Friendly |
| Australia | 23 | 27 | Lost | 16 June 1923 | Royal Agricultural Showground | Sydney | Tour Match |
| Australia | 16 | 21 | Lost | 23 June 1923 | Royal Agricultural Showground | Sydney | Tour Match |
| Australia | 12 | 14 | Lost | 25 June 1923 | Royal Agricultural Showground | Sydney | Tour Match |
| France | 12 | 3 | Won | 26 December 1926 | Stade Olympique Yves-du-Manoir | Paris | Tour Match |
| New Zealand | 18 | 37 | Lost | 2 October 1929 | Athletic Park | Wellington | Friendly |
| British Lions | 13 | 19 | Lost | 9 July 1930 | Athletic Park | Wellington | British Lions tour to New Zealand and Australia |
| Australia | 3 | 14 | Lost | 9 September 1931 | FMG Stadium | Palmerston North | Australia Tour Match |
| Australia | 6 | 31 | Lost | 23 September 1936 | FMG Stadium | Palmerston North | Australia Tour Match |
| Fiji | 3 | 3 | Draw | 20 August 1938 | Albert Park | Suva | Tour Match |
| Fiji | 5 | 11 | Lost | 24 August 1938 | Albert Park | Suva | Tour Match |
| Fiji | 6 | 3 | Won | 27 August 1938 | Albert Park | Suva | Tour Match |
| Fiji | 4 | 14 | Lost | 16 September 1939 | Rugby Park | Hamilton | Fiji Tour Match |
| Australia | 20 | 0 | Won | 25 September 1946 | Rugby Park | Hamilton | Australia Tour Match |
| Fiji | 22 | 6 | Won | 31 July 1948 | Albert Park | Suva | Tour Match |
| Fiji | 8 | 9 | Lost | 4 August 1948 | Albert Park | Suva | Tour Match |
| Fiji | 14 | 6 | Won | 7 August 1948 | Albert Park | Suva | Tour Match |
| Australia | 12 | 3 | Won | 4 June 1949 | Sydney Cricket Ground | Sydney | Tour Match |
| Australia | 8 | 8 | Draw | 11 June 1949 | Brisbane Exhibition Ground | Brisbane | Tour Match |
| Australia | 3 | 18 | Lost | 25 June 1949 | Sydney Cricket Ground | Sydney | Tour Match |
| British Lions | 9 | 14 | Lost | 2 August 1950 | Athletic Park | Wellington | Lions Tour Match |
| Fiji | 14 | 21 | Lost | 5 September 1951 | Athletic Park | Wellington | Tour Match |
| New Zealand | 22 | 28 | Lost | 26 July 1952 | Athletic Park | Wellington | Friendly |
| Fiji | 12 | 19 | Lost | 14 August 1954 | Churchill Park | Lautoka | Tour Match |
| Fiji | 16 | 8 | Won | 21 August 1954 | Buckhurst Park | Suva | Tour Match |
| Fiji | 9 | 6 | Won | 24 August 1954 | Buckhurst Park | Suva | Tour Match |
| South Africa | 0 | 37 | Lost | 25 August 1956 | Eden Park | Auckland | South Africa Tour Match |
| Fiji | 13 | 36 | Lost | 10 August 1957 | Athletic Park | Wellington | Fiji Tour Match |
| Fiji | 8 | 17 | Lost | 24 August 1957 | Carisbrook | Dunedin | Fiji Tour Match |
| Australia | 14 | 15 | Lost | 14 June 1958 | Brisbane Exhibition Ground | Brisbane | Tour Match |
| Australia | 3 | 3 | Draw | 28 June 1958 | Sydney Cricket Ground | Sydney | Tour Match |
| Australia | 13 | 6 | Won | 5 July 1958 | Olympic Park Stadium | Melbourne | Tour Match |
| New Zealand | 26 | 8 | Lost | 9 July 1958 | Eden Park | Auckland | Friendly |
| British Lions | 6 | 12 | Lost | 5 September 1959 | Eden Park | Auckland | Lions Tour Match |
| Tonga | 16 | 27 | Lost | 21 May 1960 | Teufaiva Sport Stadium | Nukuʻalofa | Tour Match |
| Samoa | 28 | 6 | Won | 4 June 1960 | Apia Park | Apia | Tour Match |
| Samoa | 31 | 5 | Won | 11 June 1960 | Apia Park | Apia | Tour Match |
| France | 5 | 32 | Lost | 29 July 1961 | McLean Park | Napier | France Tour Match |
| Fiji | 26 | 9 | Won | 25 July 1964 | Buckhurst Park | Suva | Tour Match |
| South Africa | 3 | 9 | Lost | 28 August 1965 | Athletic Park | Wellington | South Africa Tour Match |
| British Lions | 14 | 16 | Lost | 13 August 1966 | Eden Park | Auckland | Lions Tour Match |
| Tonga | 19 | 26 | Lost | 16 August 1969 | Lancaster Park | Christchurch | Tonga Tour Match |
| Tonga | 6 | 19 | Lost | 6 September 1969 | Eden Park | Auckland | Tonga Tour Match |
| Fiji | 11 | 6 | Won | 25 July 1970 | Lancaster Park | Christchurch | Fiji Tour Match |
| Fiji | 9 | 9 | Draw | 8 August 1970 | Eden Park | Auckland | Fiji Tour Match |
| British Lions | 12 | 23 | Lost | 2 June 1971 | Eden Park | Auckland | Lions Tour Match |
| Samoa | 11 | 6 | Won | 10 May 1973 | Apia Park | Apia | Tour Match |
| Samoa | 12 | 0 | Won | 12 May 1973 | Apia Park | Apia | Tour Match |
| Tonga | 3 | 11 | Lost | 22 May 1973 | Teufaiva Sport Stadium | Nukuʻalofa | Tour Match |
| Fiji | 6 | 4 | Won | 2 June 1973 | Buckhurst Park | Suva | Tour Match |
| Fiji | 9 | 3 | Won | 9 June 1973 | Churchill Park | Lautoka | Tour Match |
| New Zealand | 8 | 18 | Lost | 8 August 1973 | Rotorua International Stadium | Rotorua | Friendly |
| Fiji | 24 | 9 | Won | 17 August 1974 | Eden Park | Auckland | Fiji Tour Match |
| Fiji | 39 | 25 | Won | 31 August 1974 | Athletic Park | Wellington | Fiji Tour Match |
| Tonga | 23 | 16 | Won | 19 July 1975 | Rugby Park | New Plymouth | Tonga Tour Match |
| Tonga | 37 | 7 | Won | 2 August 1975 | Eden Park | Auckland | Tonga Tour Match |
| Samoa | 19 | 6 | Won | 17 July 1976 | Rotorua International Stadium | Rotorua | Samoa Tour Match |
| Samoa | 24 | 8 | Won | 24 July 1976 | Eden Park | Auckland | Samoa Tour Match |
| British Lions | 19 | 22 | Lost | 13 July 1977 | Eden Park | Auckland | Lions Tour Match |
| Fiji | 19 | 13 | Won | 19 May 1979 | Buckhurst Park | Suva | Tour Match |
| Samoa | 26 | 3 | Won | 22 May 1979 | Apia Park | Apia | Tour Match |
| Tonga | 26 | 9 | Won | 25 May 1979 | Teufaiva Sport Stadium | Nukuʻalofa | Tour Match |
| Fiji | 22 | 9 | Won | 30 August 1980 | Rotorua International Stadium | Rotorua | Fiji Tour Match |
| South Africa | 12 | 12 | Draw | 25 August 1981 | McLean Park | Napier | South Africa Tour Match |
| Wales | 19 | 25 | Lost | 13 November 1982 | National Stadium | Cardiff | Tour Match |
| Spain | 66 | 3 | Won | 20 November 1982 | Campo Central de la Ciudad Universitaria | Madrid | Tour Match |
| Tonga | 28 | 4 | Won | 6 June 1983 | Rotorua International Stadium | Rotorua | Tonga Tour Match |
| Tonga | 52 | 4 | Won | 13 June 1983 | Eden Park | Auckland | Tonga Tour Match |
| Spain | 22 | 12 | Won | 5 November 1988 | Instalaciones Deportivas La Cartuja | Seville | Tour Match |
| Cook Islands | 29 | 17 | Won | 10 October 1992 | National Stadium | Rarotonga | Tour Match |
| Tonga | 33 | 10 | Won | 24 October 1992 | Teufaiva Sport Stadium | Nukuʻalofa | Tour Match |
| Fiji | 35 | 34 | Won | 31 October 1992 | National Stadium | Suva | Tour Match |
| British Lions | 20 | 24 | Lost | 29 May 1993 | Athletic Park | Wellington | Lions Tour Match |
| Fiji | 34 | 13 | Won | 4 June 1994 | Lancaster Park | Christchurch | Fiji Tour Match |
| Samoa | 28 | 15 | Won | 14 June 1996 | Ericsson Stadium | Auckland | Samoa Tour Match |
| Fiji | 25 | 10 | Won | 1 November 1996 | National Stadium | Suva | Tour Match |
| Tonga | 29 | 20 | Won | 8 November 1996 | Teufaiva Sport Stadium | Nukuʻalofa | Tour Match |
| Argentina | 39 | 17 | Won | 14 June 1997 | McLean Park | Napier | Argentina Tour Match |
| Samoa | 34 | 20 | Won | 21 August 1997 | Apia Park | Apia | Tour Match |
| Tonga | 66 | 7 | Won | 19 June 1998 | Lowe Walker Stadium | Whangarei | Tonga Tour Match |
| England | 62 | 14 | Won | 23 June 1998 | Rotorua International Stadium | Rotorua | England Tour Match |
| Scotland | 24 | 8 | Won | 14 November 1998 | Murrayfield Stadium | Edinburgh | Tour Match |
| Fiji | 57 | 20 | Won | 3 August 1999 | National Stadium | Suva | Tour Match |
| Scotland | 18 | 15 | Won | 17 June 2000 | Yarrow Stadium | New Plymouth | Scotland Tour Match |
| Australia | 29 | 41 | Lost | 9 June 2001 | Sydney Football Stadium | Sydney | Tour Match |
| Argentina | 43 | 24 | Won | 26 June 2001 | Rotorua International Stadium | Rotorua | Argentina Tour Match |
| Australia | 23 | 27 | Lost | 15 June 2002 | Subiaco Oval | Perth | Tour Match |
| Tonga | 47 | 12 | Won | 2 June 2003 | North Harbour Stadium | Albany | Tonga Tour Match |
| England | 9 | 23 | Lost | 9 June 2003 | Yarrow Stadium | New Plymouth | England Tour Match |
| Canada | 65 | 27 | Won | 26 July 2003 | Kingsland | Calgary | Tour Match |
| Canada | 30 | 9 | Won | 2 August 2003 | York Stadium | Toronto | Tour Match |
| United States | 69 | 31 | Won | 12 June 2004 | Calgary Rugby Park | Calgary | Churchill Cup |
| Fiji | 29 | 27 | Won | 3 June 2005 | Albert Park | Suva | Tour Match |
| British & Irish Lions | 19 | 13 | Won | 11 June 2005 | Waikato Stadium | Hamilton | Lions Tour Match |
| United States | 74 | 6 | Won | 8 June 2006 | Buck Shaw Stadium | Santa Clara | Churchill Cup |
| Canada | 59 | 23 | Won | 26 May 2007 | Franklin's Gardens | Northampton | Churchill Cup |
| Tonga | 20 | 9 | Won | 7 June 2008 | North Harbour Stadium | Albany | Pacific Nations Cup |
| Fiji | 11 | 7 | Won | 14 June 2008 | Churchill Park | Lautoka | Pacific Nations Cup |
| Samoa | 17 | 6 | Won | 21 June 2008 | Waikato Stadium | Hamilton | Pacific Nations Cup |
| Japan | 65 | 22 | Won | 28 June 2008 | McLean Park | Napier | Pacific Nations Cup |
| Ireland | 31 | 28 | Won | 18 June 2010 | Rotorua International Stadium | Rotorua | Centenary Series Match |
| England | 35 | 28 | Won | 23 June 2010 | McLean Park | Napier | Centenary Series Match |
| Canada | 32 | 19 | Won | 23 November 2012 | Oxford University | Oxford | Tour Match |
| Canada | 40 | 15 | Won | 3 November 2013 | BMO Field | Toronto | Tour Match |
| United States | 29 | 19 | Won | 9 November 2013 | PPL Park | Philadelphia | Tour Match |
| Japan | 61 | 21 | Won | 1 November 2014 | Noevir Stadium | Kobe | Tour Match |
| Japan | 20 | 18 | Won | 8 November 2014 | Chichibunomiya Rugby Stadium | Tokyo | Tour Match |
| Fiji | 27 | 26 | Won | 11 July 2015 | ANZ National Stadium | Suva | Fiji Tour Match |
| United States | 54 | 7 | Won | 4 November 2016 | Toyota Park | Chicago | Māori All Blacks tour to Northern Hemisphere |
| British & Irish Lions | 10 | 32 | Lost | 17 June 2017 | Rotorua International Stadium | Rotorua | British & Irish Lions tour to New Zealand |
| Canada | 51 | 9 | Won | 3 November 2017 | BC Place | Vancouver | Māori All Blacks tour to Northern Hemisphere |
| United States | 59 | 22 | Won | 3 November 2018 | Soldier Field | Chicago | Māori All Blacks tour to America and South America |
| Brazil | 35 | 3 | Won | 10 November 2018 | Estádio do Morumbi | São Paulo | Māori All Blacks tour to America and South America |
| Chile | 73 | 0 | Won | 17 November 2018 | Estadio San Carlos de Apoquindo | Las Condes | Māori All Blacks tour to America and South America |
| Fiji | 10 | 27 | Lost | 13 July 2019 | ANZ National Stadium | Suva | Māori All Blacks and Fiji two-match series |
| Fiji | 26 | 17 | Won | 20 July 2019 | Rotorua International Stadium | Rotorua | Māori All Blacks and Fiji two-match series |
| Samoa | 35 | 10 | Won | 26 June 2021 | Sky Stadium | Wellington | Māori All Blacks and Samoa two-match series |
| Samoa | 38 | 21 | Won | 3 July 2021 | Mount Smart Stadium | Auckland | Māori All Blacks and Samoa two-match series |
| Ireland | 32 | 17 | Won | 29 June 2022 | FMG Stadium Waikato | Hamilton | 2022 Ireland rugby union tour of New Zealand |
| Ireland | 24 | 30 | Lost | 12 July 2022 | Sky Stadium | Wellington | 2022 Ireland rugby union tour of New Zealand |
| Japan XV | 36 | 10 | Won | 29 June 2024 | Chichibunomiya Rugby Stadium | Tokyo | 2024 July internationals |
| Japan XV | 14 | 26 | Lost | 6 July 2024 | Toyota Stadium | Toyota | 2024 July internationals |
| Japan XV | 53 | 20 | Won | 29 June 2025 | Chichibunomiya Rugby Stadium | Tokyo | 2025 July internationals |
| Scotland | 26 | 29 | Lost | 5 July 2025 | Semenoff Stadium | Whangārei | 2025 July internationals |

=== Overall ===
| Opponent | Played | Won | Lost | Drawn | % Won |
|---|---|---|---|---|---|
| Argentina | 2 | 2 | 0 | 0 | 100% |
| Australia | 18 | 6 | 10 | 2 | 33.33% |
| Brazil | 1 | 1 | 0 | 0 | 100% |
| British & Irish Lions | 9 | 1 | 8 | 0 | 11.11% |
| Canada | 6 | 6 | 0 | 0 | 100% |
| Chile | 1 | 1 | 0 | 0 | 100% |
| Cook Islands | 1 | 1 | 0 | 0 | 100% |
| England | 4 | 2 | 2 | 0 | 50% |
| Fiji | 31 | 21 | 8 | 2 | 67.74% |
| France | 2 | 1 | 0 | 1 | 50% |
| Ireland | 4 | 3 | 1 | 0 | 75% |
| Japan | 3 | 3 | 0 | 0 | 100% |
| Japan XV | 3 | 2 | 1 | 0 | 66.67% |
| New Zealand | 5 | 0 | 5 | 0 | 0% |
| Samoa | 12 | 12 | 0 | 0 | 100% |
| Scotland | 3 | 2 | 1 | 0 | 66.67% |
| South Africa | 4 | 0 | 3 | 1 | 0% |
| Spain | 2 | 2 | 0 | 0 | 100% |
| Tonga | 14 | 10 | 4 | 0 | 71.43% |
| United States | 5 | 5 | 0 | 0 | 100% |
| Wales | 2 | 0 | 2 | 0 | 0% |
| Total | 132 | 81 | 45 | 6 | 61.36% |

Updated: 5 July 2025

== Players ==
=== Current squad ===
On 24 June 2025, Head Coach Ross Filipo named a 29-player squad for their July internationals against Japan XV and Scotland.

Note: Bold denotes players who are internationally capped, Caps correct as of 29 June 2024

| Player | Position | Date of birth (age) | Caps | Franchise/province | Iwi |
|---|---|---|---|---|---|
| Jacob Devery | Hooker | 21 October 1998 (age 28) | 0 | Hurricanes / Hawke's Bay | Te Aitanga-a-Māhaki |
| Kurt Eklund | Hooker | 5 January 1992 (age 34) | 7 | Blues / Bay of Plenty | Ngāti Kahu |
| Benet Kumeroa | Prop | 25 June 2000 (age 26) | 2 | Chiefs / Bay of Plenty | Te Atihaunui a Pāpārangi |
| Jared Proffit | Prop | 14 September 1993 (age 33) | 0 | Chiefs / Taranaki | Ngāti Porou |
| Pouri Rakete-Stones | Prop | 17 June 1997 (age 29) | 4 | Hurricanes / Hawke's Bay | Ngāpuhi |
| Kershawl Sykes-Martin | Prop | 26 April 1999 (age 27) | 0 | Crusaders / Tasman | Ngāti Porou |
| Mason Tupaea | Prop | 16 October 2002 (age 24) | 0 | Blues / Waikato | Ngāti Tiipa / Ngāti Āmaru |
| Zach Gallagher | Lock | 4 September 2001 (age 25) | 0 | Hurricanes / Canterbury | Te Ātiawa |
| Laghlan McWhannell | Lock | 20 October 1998 (age 28) | 2 | Blues / Waikato | Ngāti Kahungunu |
| Antonio Shalfoon | Lock | 10 August 1997 (age 29) | 0 | Crusaders / Tasman | Whakatōhea |
| Isaia Walker-Leawere | Lock | 16 April 1997 (age 29) | 12 | Hurricanes / Hawke's Bay | Ngāti Porou |
| Nikora Broughton | Loose forward | 5 September 2001 (age 25) | 1 | Highlanders / Bay of Plenty | Ngā Rauru / Ngāti Ruanui |
| Jahrome Brown | Loose forward | 29 September 1996 (age 30) | 0 | Chiefs / Waikato | Ngāti Porou |
| Caleb Delany | Loose forward | 4 February 2000 (age 26) | 1 | Hurricanes / Wellington | Ngāti Tūwharetoa |
| **Cullen Grace** | Loose forward | 20 December 1999 (age 26) | 3 | Crusaders / Canterbury | Ngāti Whakaue |
| TK Howden | Loose forward | 28 January 2001 (age 25) | 4 | Highlanders / Manawatu | Ngāi Tūhoe |
| Kemara Hauiti-Parapara | Halfback | 5 March 1997 (age 29) | 0 | Auckland | Ngāi Tai / Ngāti Porou |
| Sam Nock | Halfback | 18 June 1996 (age 30) | 5 | Blues / Northland | Ngāpuhi |
| Rivez Reihana | First five-eighth | 25 May 2000 (age 26) | 2 | Crusaders / Northland | Ngāi Tahu / Ngāpuhi / Ngāti Hine / Ngāti Tūwharetoa |
| Kaleb Trask | First five-eighth | 27 January 1999 (age 27) | 2 | Chiefs / Bay of Plenty | Ngāpuhi |
| Corey Evans | Centre | 11 January 2001 (age 25) | 1 | Blues / Northland | Te Aupouri / Ngāti Kahu |
| Daniel Rona | Centre | 10 April 2000 (age 26) | 1 | Chiefs / Taranaki | Te Ātiawa |
| Bailyn Sullivan | Centre | 3 September 1998 (age 28) | 4 | Hurricanes / Waikato | Ngāti Kahungunu |
| Xavi Taele | Centre | 19 December 2004 (age 21) | 0 | Blues / Auckland | Ngāi Tahu |
| Gideon Wrampling | Centre | 26 July 2001 (age 25) | 0 | Chiefs / Waikato | Ngāpuhi / Ngāti Hine |
| Cole Forbes | Wing | 10 August 1999 (age 27) | 2 | Blues / Bay of Plenty | Ngāti Awa |
| Jonah Lowe | Wing | 9 May 1996 (age 30) | 5 | Highlanders / Hawke's Bay | Ngāti Pikiao |
| Zarn Sullivan | Fullback | 10 July 2000 (age 26) | 1 | Blues / Hawke's Bay | Ngāti Kahungunu |

- Kade Banks (Hurricanes; North Harbour; Ngāpuhi / Ngāti Whātua) joined the squad as temporary injury cover for Daniel Rona.

== See also ==
- New Zealand Māori rugby league team
- New Zealand Māori cricket team
