= Kelvin Hendrie =

British Lions & Scotland international rugby union player

Kelvin Gladstone Peter Hendrie (2 July 1898 – December 1953 (aged 54–55)) was a Scottish international rugby union player, who played for Scotland and the Lions.

He played at No. 8 for Heriot's FP. He was capped for Scotland three times and was on the 1924 British Lions tour to South Africa, where he played in one test.
