= Hugh McVicker =

Rugby union player from Northern Ireland

- Born: 9 February 1901 Ballymoney, County Antrim, Ireland
- Died: 19 January 1931 (aged 29) Peshawar, British India
- Notable relative(s): Jim McVicker (brother); Sam McVicker (brother)

Rugby union career
- Position: Second row
International career
Years	Team	Apps	(Points)
1927–28	Ireland	5	(3)

Hugh McVicker (9 February 1901 — 19 January 1931) was an Irish international rugby union player.

Born in Ballymoney, County Antrim, McVicker was the younger brother of Ireland players Jim and Sam McVicker.

McVicker, a second row forward, captained Edinburgh University and was playing for the Army when he won his Ireland call up in 1927, scoring a try on his debut against England at Twickenham. He gained five Ireland caps.

A captain in the Royal Army Medical Corps, McVicker left Ireland for overseas service at the end of 1927. He died of pneumonia in Peshawar in 1931, at the age of 29.

== See also ==
- List of Ireland national rugby union players
