= Rodney Cove-Smith =

English physician (1943-2004)

John Rodney Cove-Smith (26 January 1943, London – 3 February 2004, Middlesbrough) was the son of Ronald Cove-Smith, a distinguished English physician and captain of the English rugby team.

== Career ==
He was educated first at Rugby, where he was head boy, then, following in his father's footsteps, he read medicine at Gonville and Caius College, Cambridge, later specialising in nephrology. A keen sportsman, he played hockey for England Schoolboys and Cambridge.

In 1978 he was appointed consultant in Middlesbrough, where he remained until his death from metastatic prostate cancer in 2004. He also championed the cause of postgraduate and, more recently, of undergraduate medical training on Teesside. He was clinical tutor from 1987 to 1990, was a prime mover in the expansion of the Durham and Newcastle Medical School to the Stockton Queen's Campus and, as chief of the academic division in the James Cook University Hospital, he led the development of the academic centre there. In recognition of this he was awarded an honorary chair by Durham University, and the new medical library bears his name.

== Personal life ==
In 1969 he married Jacqueline Morgan, a doctor, who had studied at Cambridge with him. They had three daughters, Julia, Andi and Laura, two of whom are doctors.

He continued playing hockey and squash until failing health intervened, and was a member of two choral societies.
