= 1926–27 New Zealand Māori rugby union tour =

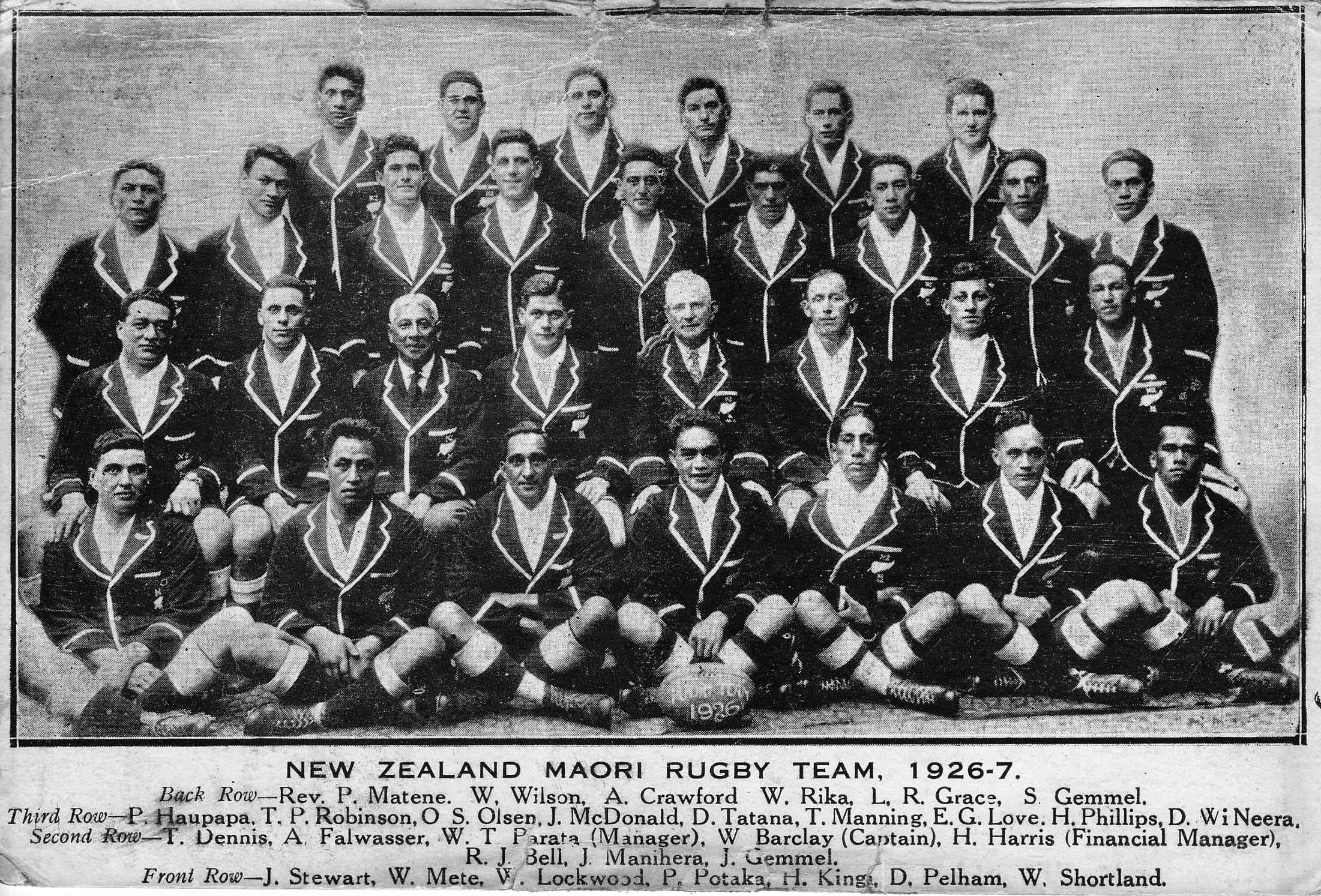
- Touring side
Summary
P	W	D	L
Total
40	31	2	7
Test match
0	0	0	0

Tour chronology
- Previous tour: 1888–89 B.Isles & Australia
- Next tour: 1949 Australia

The 1926–27 New Zealand Māori rugby union tour was a collection of rugby union games undertaken by the New Zealand Māori team against invitational and national teams of New Zealand, Australia, France, Great Britain and Canada.

== The matches ==
=== Preliminary ===
Scores and results list NZ Maoris' points tally first.

Opposing Team	For	Against	Date	Venue	Status
Auckland	13	12	17 July 1926	Auckland	Tour match
Wellington	16	28	21 July 1926	Wellington	Tour match
Victoria	30	0	31 July 1926	Motrorbrome, Melbourne	Tour match
Victoria	57	0	2 August 1926	Motrorbrome, Melbourne	Tour match
Sri Lanka	37	6	18 August 1926	Colombo	Tour match

=== Europe ===
Scores and results list NZ Maoris' points tally first.

Opposing Team	For	Against	Date	Venue	Status
Olympique Marseille	87	0	13 September 1926	Marseille	Tour match
Burgundy	27	3	17 September 1926	Dijon	Tour match
Comite des Alpes	23	6	19 September 1926	Grenoble	Tour match
Comite du Littoral	29	8	23 September 1926	Avignon	Tour match
Comite Lyonnaise	14	3	26 September 1926	Lyon	Tour match
Languedoc	8	5	30 September 1926	Narbonne	Tour match
Cote Basque	11	3	3 October 1926	Bayonne	Tour match
Comite du Centre	16	3	7 October 1926	Clermont-Ferrand	Tour match
Paris	9	11	10 October 1926	Stade Olympique de Colombes, Paris	Tour match
Somerset	21	8	16 October 1926	Weston-super-Mare	Tour match
Newport RFC	0	0	21 October 1926	Rodney Parade, Newport	Tour match
Swansea RFC	11	6	23 October 1926	St. Helen's, Swansea	Tour match
Yorkshire	17	9	27 October 1926		Tour match
Harlequins	5	11	30 October 1926	Twickenham, London	Tour match
Devonshire	0	20	3 November 1926	Devonport	Tour match
Cardiff RFC	18	8	6 November 1926	Arms Park, Cardiff	Tour match
Gloucestershire	0	3	10 November 1926	Bristol	Tour match
Llanelli RFC	0	3	13 November 1926	Stradey Park, Llanelli	Tour match
East Midland	3	3	16 November 1926		Tour match
Blackheath	9	5	20 November 1926	Blackheath	Tour match
Cornwall	6	3	24 November 1926	Falmouth	Tour match
Leicester	15	13	27 November 1926	Welford Road, Leicester	Tour match
Lancashire	11	6	1 December 1926	Manchester	Tour match
France XV	13	3	5 December 1926	Bordeaux	Tour match
Limoges XV	34	0	9 December 1926	Limoges	Tour match
Perpignan	9	8	12 December 1926	Perpignan	Tour match
Béarn-Bigorre-Pays Basque	16	6	16 December 1926	Pau, Stade de la Croix du Prince	Tour match
France XV	25	12	19 December 1926	Beziers	Tour match
France	12	3	26 December 1926	Colombes, Paris	Tour match
Cardiff RFC	5	3	28 December 1926	(National Stadium), Cardiff	Tour match
Pontypool RFC	5	6	1 January 1927	Pontypool	Tour match

=== In Canada ===
Scores and results list NZ Maoris' points tally first.

Opposing Team	For	Against	Date	Venue	Status
Vancouver	33	9	29 January 1927	Vancouver	Tour match
Brit. Columbia University	12	3	2 February 1927	Vancouver	Tour match
All Mainland	43	0	5 February 1927	Vancouver	Tour match
Victoria BC	41	3	9 February 1927	Vancouver	Tour match

== Bibliography ==
All found on link

- The Sydney Morning Herald, Monday 19 July 1926 p 17
- The Sydney Morning Herald, Thursday 22 July 1926 p 15
- The Brisbane Courier, Monday 2 August 1926 p 15
- The Argus, Tuesday 3 August 1926 p 7
- The Mercury, Friday 20 August 1926 p 12
- Barrier Miner, Monday 13 September 1926 p 4
- The Argus, Saturday 18 September 1926 p 30
- The West Australian, Tuesday 21 September 1926 p 10
- The West Australian, Saturday 25 September 1926 p 15
- The Argus, Tuesday 28 September 1926 p 6
- The Mercury, Saturday 2 October 1926 p 7
- The West Australian, Tuesday 5 October 1926 p 13
- The West Australian, Saturday 9 October 1926 p 17
- The Brisbane Courier, Tuesday 12 October 1926 p 13
- The West Australian, Monday 18 October 1926 p 13
- The Brisbane Courier, Saturday 23 October 1926 p 11
- The Sydney Morning Herald, Monday 25 October 1926 p 15
- The Brisbane Courier, Friday 29 October 1926 p 8
- The West Australian, Monday 1 November 1926 p 13
- The Brisbane Courier, Friday 5 November 1926 p 15
- The Brisbane Courier, Monday 8 November 1926 p 6
- The Mercury, Friday 12 November 1926 p 4
- The Brisbane Courier, Monday 15 November 1926 p 7
- Cairns Post, Saturday 20 November 1926 p 5
- The Brisbane Courier, Monday 22 November 1926 p 7
- The Mercury, Friday 26 November 1926 p 11
- The Sydney Morning Herald, Monday 29 November 1926 p 13
- The Brisbane Courier, Friday 3 December 1926 p 5
- Advocate (Burnie), Tuesday 7 December 1926 p 1
- The Brisbane Courier, Saturday 11 December 1926 p 4
- The Sydney Morning Herald, Tuesday 14 December 1926 p 14
- The Brisbane Courier, Saturday 18 December 1926 p 5
- The Argus, Tuesday 21 December 1926 p 8
- The Sydney Morning Herald, Tuesday 28 December 1926 p 11
- The Mercury, Thursday 30 December 1926 p 4
- The Mercury, Monday 3 January 1927 p 2
- The West Australian, Tuesday 1 February 1927 p 8
- The Brisbane Courier, Friday 4 February 1927 p 5
- The Brisbane Courier, Monday 7 February 1927 p 6
- The West Australian, Friday 11 February 1927 p 15
