= Vince Griffiths =

- Born: Vincent Morgan Griffiths; 29 May 1901 Pontypridd, Wales
- Died: 7 January 1967 (aged 65) Newport, Wales
- School: West Monmouth School
- University: Bristol University

Rugby union career
- Position: Outside Half
Amateur team(s)
| Years | Team | Apps | (Points) |
- Pontypool RFC
| 1923-1929 | Newport RFC | | |
International career
| Years | Team | Apps | (Points) |
| 1924 | Wales | 3 | (7) |
| 1924 | British Isles | 2 | (0) |

Vince Griffiths (29 May 1901 – 7 January 1967) was a Welsh rugby union player who represented Wales and the British Lions. Griffiths played club rugby for Newport and captained the team in the 1928/29 season.

Griffiths gained his first cap for Wales in 1924 against Scotland at Inverleith. Wales were humiliated by Scotland, but Griffiths scored a try and regained his position to be chosen to face Ireland in the next match of the Five Nations Championship. Griffiths's last game for Wales was against Ireland, but was chosen to join the British Lions 1924 tour of South Africa; he played in six games, including two tests.

== International matches played ==
Wales

- France 1924
- France 1924
- Scotland 1924

British Lions

- South Africa 1924, 1924

== Bibliography ==
- Smith, David; Williams, Gareth (1980). Fields of Praise: The Official History of The Welsh Rugby Union. Cardiff: University of Wales Press. ISBN 0-7083-0766-3.

Rugby Union Captain
| Preceded by William Roche | Newport RFC captain 1927-1929 | Succeeded by Harry Phillips |
