= 1949 New Zealand Māori rugby union tour of Australia =

The 1949 New Zealand Māori rugby union tour was a collection of rugby union games undertaken by the New Zealand Māori against invitational and national teams of Australia.

The Maoris plays 11 match, winning 9 of them and losing only one (1 tied).

Three test matches against Australia were played. The victory in the first match against the "Wallabies" was clamorous and the Australian coach Johnny Wallace was fired. The new coach was Bill McLean, historical captain of the 1947-48 tour in Europe. For the first time, the Australian team was directed by a coach from Queensland and not from New South Wales.

== The matches ==
Scores and results list NZ Maoris' points tally first.

Opposing Team	For	Against	Date	Venue	Status
Southern States	35	8	21/5/1949	Melbourne	Tour Match
A.C.T.	47	3	24/5/1949	Canberra	Tour Match
New South Wales	19	14	28/5/1949	Sydney	Tour Match
Newcastle	17	0	1/6/1949	Newcastle	Tour Match
Australia	12	3	4/6/1949	Sydney, Cricket Ground	Test Match
New England RU	42	10	8/6/1949	Armidale	Tour Match
Australia	8	8	11/6/1949	Brisbane, Exhibition Ground	Test Match
Queensland	13	8	14/6/1949	Exhibition Ground	Tour Match
New South Wales	11	9	18/6/1949	Newcastle	Tour Match
Central West	51	5	22/6/1949	Orange	Tour Match
Australia	3	18	25/6/1949	Sydney, Cricket Ground	Test Match

== Touring party ==
The touring part was:

- Manager: D S B Heather
- Assistant Manager: T French

Player	Province	Position
B W Beazley	North Auckland	Five-eighths
Alan Blake	Wairarapa	Forward
Ron Bryers	King Country	Forward
William Carrington	Poverty Bay	Forward
Nau Cherrington	North Auckland	Three-quarters
Ben Couch	Wairarapa	Five-eighths
M E Delamore	Bay of Plenty	Three-quarters
S Heperi	Welington	Forward
L W Hohaia	Taranaki	Forward
R L Hohaia	Wellington	Forward
H W Kenny	Wellington	Fullback
T D Kipa	Auckland	Five-eighths
W Lanigan	East Coast	Three-quarters
R M McKinlay	Poverty Bay	Three-quarters
J H Marriner	King Country	Forward
Kingi Matthews	Wairarapa	Forward
G K Parahi	Hawkes Bay	Forward
L F Raureti	Bay of Plenty	Halfback
Tori Reid	Hawkes Bay	Forward
Peter Smith (Vice Cpt)	North Auckland	Five-eighths
C W Stirling	North Auckland	Forward
W H Taylor	Golden Bay Moueka	Three-quarters
A J West (Cpt)	Auckland	Forward
