= List of 1888–89 New Zealand Native football team matches =

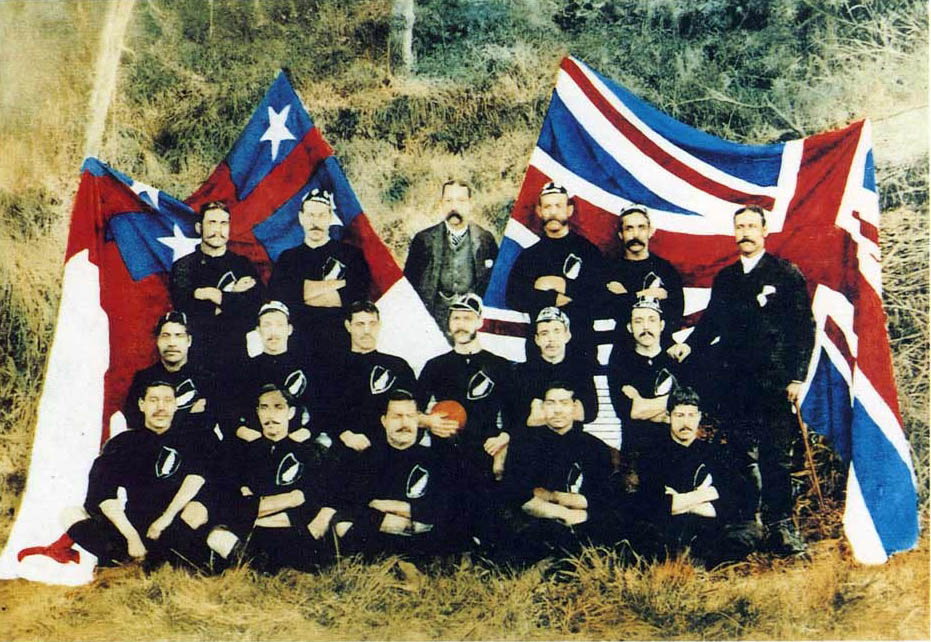
The New Zealand Natives before their match against Queensland in July 1889, in front of the United Tribes flag and the Union Jack

The 1888–89 New Zealand Native football team played 107 rugby union matches during their 14-month tour of the British Isles, Australia, and New Zealand. The tour was the longest in rugby history, and the first by a New Zealand team to Europe. The team was privately organised by Joe Warbrick, (Note: The tour was not organised under the authority of any provincial or national unions such as the Rugby Football Union.) and was originally intended to contain only Māori players. Several non-Māori and a number of non-New Zealand-born players were eventually recruited to strengthen the side. Of their rugby matches, they won 78, lost 23, and drew 6. The team played three internationals: a heavy loss to England, a win over Ireland, and a narrow loss to Wales.

The initial leg of the Native team's journey was a tour of New Zealand, and their first match was a 5–0 victory over Hawke's Bay. The team departed from New Zealand having won seven of their nine matches, but their losses included a heavy defeat to Auckland. After stopping in Melbourne on their way to London, they played their first match in England against Surrey on 3 October 1888. The team played 74 matches in the British Isles—with 36 of these in their first three months. Only one match was played in Scotland, against Hawick RFC, and three in Ireland. The intense itinerary of matches continued during the second half of their British Isles leg; this contributed to a high injury rate, and the team struggled to field a full side during much of this time. Despite the injury toll, they won 14 of their last 20 matches in England. While in the British Isles the Natives averaged a game every 2.3 days.

Following their departure from Plymouth in March 1889, the Natives travelled to Melbourne, Australia. There the team played eight Australian rules football (then known as Victorian rules) matches and two rugby games. The team continued their journey to New South Wales and Queensland, where they played mostly rugby. This included playing each state side twice, as well as at least two association football matches. The final leg of the team's trip was another tour of New Zealand—this saw them lose only once, to Auckland in their final game.

== Matches played ==
Notes on scoring:

- For the rugby matches in the British Isles, Victoria, and New Zealand tries scored one point, conversions two points, and penalties and drop goals three points.
- For the rugby matches in New South Wales tries scored three points, conversions two points, and drop goals four points.
- For the rugby matches in Queensland tries scored two points, conversions three points, and drop goals four points.
- For Victorian Rules matches the numbers in brackets under points scored states the goals, then behinds (goals/behinds).
- For Victorian Rules matches the number before the brackets is the score calculated with goals worth six points, and behinds one.

Notes on matches:

- The match record for the British Isles is considered complete, however the match record of the Victorian Rules and Association football matches in the Australian leg of the tour is a matter of some debate. The list of Victorian Rules matches was compiled by historian Greg Ryan and relied heavily on coverage of the matches in the Melbourne press. The frequency of matches suggests the list is complete.

Notes on opposition:

- As the tour occurred before the 1895 schism of rugby football—where many northern English rugby clubs left the Rugby Football Union to form the Northern Union (Note: The Northern Union was the predecessor of the Rugby Football League.)—many of the team's opponents in the British Isles later elected to play rugby league rather than rugby union. The links in the tables below link to those clubs regardless of what code they subsequently played.
- At least one club, Manningham F.C., has since converted to association football.

=== Summary ===
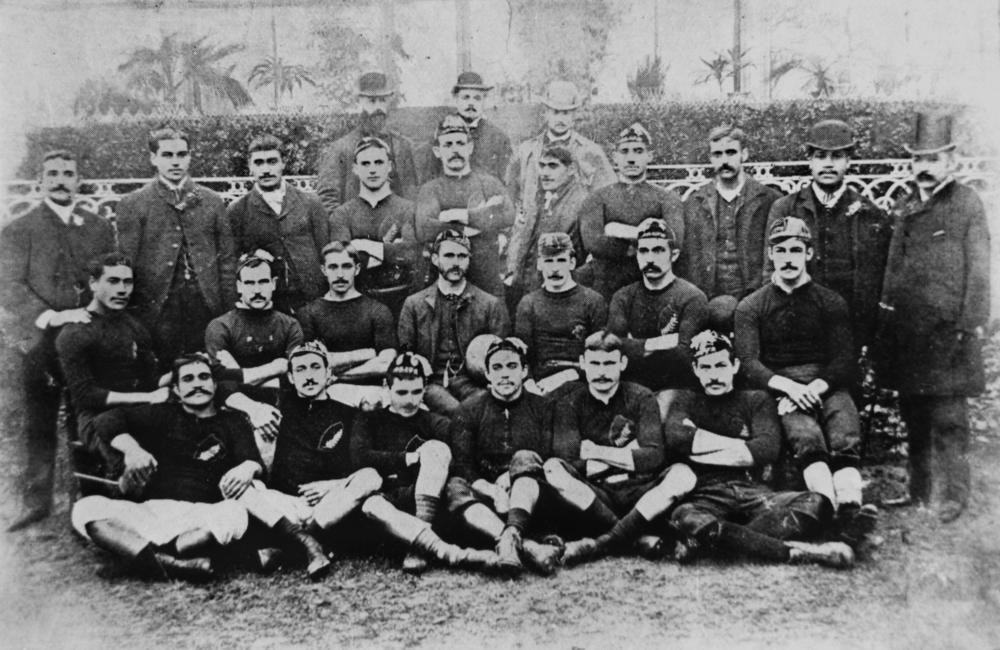
The New Zealand Native football team prior to playing Middlesex at Sheffield Park in October 1888

Rugby matches
| Played in | Matches | Won | Lost | Drawn | Points for | Points against |
| Britain and Ireland | 74 | 49 | 20 | 5 | 394 | 188 |
| New Zealand | 17 | 14 | 3 | 0 | 119 | 51 |
| Australia | 16 | 15 | 0 | 1 | 240 | 66 |
| Total | 107 | 78 | 23 | 6 | 753 | 305 |

Victorian Rules matches
| Matches | Won | Lost | Drawn | Goals | Behinds |
| 11 | 3 | 8 | 0 | 36 | 55 |

=== New Zealand and Victoria ===
| Date | Opponents | Venue | For | Against |
|---|---|---|---|---|
| 23 June 1888 | Hawke's Bay | Napier | 5 | 0 |
| 30 June 1888 | Hawke's Bay | Napier | 11 | 0 |
| 7 July 1888 | Auckland | Auckland | 0 | 9 |
| 11 July 1888 | Nelson | Nelson | 9 | 0 |
| 14 July 1888 | Wellington | Wellington | 3 | 0 |
| 21 July 1888 | Canterbury | Christchurch | 5 | 4 |
| 24 July 1888 | South Canterbury | Timaru | 9 | 0 |
| 28 July 1888 | Otago | Dunedin | 0 | 8 |
| 31 July 1888 | Otago | Dunedin | 1 | 0 |
| 11 August 1888 | Melbourne | Melbourne | 3 | 0 |
| 15 August 1888 | Melbourne | Melbourne | 1 | 1 |
| Total | | | 47 | 22 |

Source: "Matches played—New Zealand Natives' rugby tour, 1888/89". nzhistory.net.nz. Archived from the original on 15 December 2013.

=== British Isles ===
| Date | Opponents | Venue | For | Against |
|---|---|---|---|---|
| 3 October 1888 | Surrey | Richmond | 4 | 1 |
| 6 October 1888 | Northamptonshire | Northampton | 12 | 0 |
| 10 October 1888 | Kent | Blackheath | 4 | 1 |
| 13 October 1888 | Moseley | Moseley | 4 | 6 |
| 18 October 1888 | Burton-on-Trent | Burton-on-Trent | 3 | 4 |
| 20 October 1888 | Midland Counties | Birmingham | 10 | 0 |
| 22 October 1888 | Middlesex | Fletching (Note: This match was played at Sheffield Park.) | 0 | 9 |
| 24 October 1888 | Hull | Hull | 0 | 1 |
| 27 October 1888 | Dewsbury | Dewsbury | 6 | 0 |
| 31 October 1888 | Wakefield Trinity | Wakefield | 0 | 1 |
| 3 November 1888 | Northumberland County | Newcastle | 3 | 3 |
| 5 November 1888 | Stockton-on-Tees | Stockton | 6 | 1 |
| 7 November 1888 | Tynemouth | North Shields | 7 | 1 |
| 10 November 1888 | Halifax Free Wanderers | Halifax | 4 | 13 |
| 12 November 1888 | Newcastle and District | Newcastle | 14 | 0 |
| 14 November 1888 | Hartlepool Rovers | Hartlepool | 1 | 0 |
| 17 November 1888 | Cumberland County | Maryport | 10 | 2 |
| 20 November 1888 | Carlisle | Carlisle | 13 | 0 |
| 22 November 1888 | Hawick | Hawick | 3 | 1 |
| 23 November 1888 | East Cumberland | Carlisle | 12 | 0 |
| 24 November 1888 | Westmorland County | Kendal | 3 | 1 |
| 26 November 1888 | Swinton | Swinton | 0 | 2 |
| 28 November 1888 | Liverpool and District | Liverpool | 9 | 0 |
| 1 December 1888 | Ireland | Dublin | 13 | 4 |
| 3 December 1888 | Trinity College | Dublin | 4 | 4 |
| 5 December 1888 | North of Ireland | Belfast | 2 | 0 |
| 8 December 1888 | Lancashire County | Manchester | 0 | 1 |
| 10 December 1888 | Batley | Batley | 5 | 5 |
| 12 December 1888 | Yorkshire County | Manningham | 10 | 6 |
| 15 December 1888 | Broughton Rangers | Broughton | 8 | 0 |
| 17 December 1888 | Wigan | Wigan | 5 | 1 |
| 19 December 1888 | Llanelli | Llanelli | 0 | 3 |
| 22 December 1888 | Wales | Swansea | 0 | 5 |
| 24 December 1888 | Swansea | Swansea | 5 | 0 |
| 26 December 1888 | Newport | Newport | 3 | 0 |
| 29 December 1888 | Cardiff | Cardiff | 1 | 4 |
| 1 January 1889 | Bradford | Bradford | 1 | 4 |
| 3 January 1889 | Leeds Parish Church | Leeds | 6 | 3 |
| 5 January 1889 | Kirkstall | Kirkstall | 7 | 3 |
| 7 January 1889 | Brighouse Rangers | Brighouse | 4 | 0 |
| 9 January 1889 | Huddersfield | Huddersfield | 7 | 6 |
| 12 January 1889 | Stockport | Stockport | 3 | 3 |
| 14 January 1889 | Castleford | Castleford | 3 | 9 |
| 17 January 1889 | Warrington | Warrington | 7 | 1 |
| 19 January 1889 | Yorkshire County | Wakefield | 4 | 16 |
| 23 January 1889 | Spen Valley District | Cleckheaton | 8 | 7 |
| 26 January 1889 | Somersetshire County | Wellington | 17 | 4 |
| 30 January 1889 | Devonshire County | Exeter | 12 | 0 |
| 31 January 1889 | Taunton | Taunton | 8 | 0 |
| 2 February 1889 | Gloucestershire County | Gloucester | 4 | 1 |
| 4 February 1889 | Midland Counties | Moseley | 6 | 1 |
| 6 February 1889 | Blackheath Rovers | Blackheath | 9 | 3 |
| 9 February 1889 | United Services | Portsmouth | 10 | 0 |
| 16 February 1889 | England | Blackheath | 0 | 7 |
| 18 February 1889 | London Welsh | Richmond | 2 | 1 |
| 19 February 1889 | Cambridge University | Cambridge | 3 | 7 |
| 21 February 1889 | Oxford University | Oxford | 0 | 6 |
| 23 February 1889 | Manningham | Manningham | 4 | 0 |
| 25 February 1889 | St. John's, Leeds | Leeds | 9 | 0 |
| 27 February 1889 | Leigh | Leigh | 1 | 4 |
| 2 March 1889 | Runcorn | Runcorn | 8 | 3 |
| 4 March 1889 | Oldham | Oldham | 0 | 6 |
| 5 March 1889 | Halifax Free Wanderers | Halifax | 6 | 0 |
| 7 March 1889 | Barrow and District | Barrow | 0 | 3 |
| 9 March 1889 | Widnes | Widnes | 8 | 1 |
| 11 March 1889 | Manchester | Manchester | 7 | 1 |
| 13 March 1889 | Walkden | Walkden | 6 | 1 |
| 14 March 1889 | St. Helens | St. Helens | 9 | 0 |
| 16 March 1889 | Salford | Salford | 7 | 1 |
| 18 March 1889 | Rochdale Hornets | Rochdale | 10 | 0 |
| 20 March 1889 | York | York | 4 | 3 |
| 23 March 1889 | Hull | Hull | 1 | 1 |
| 25 March 1889 | Widnes | Widnes | 6 | 1 |
| 27 March 1889 | Southern Counties | Leyton | 3 | 1 |
| Total | | | 394 | 188 |

Source: (Ryan 1993, p. 143)

=== Australia ===
| Date | Opponents | Venue | For | Against | Ref |
|---|---|---|---|---|---|
| 24 May 1889 | Melbourne | Melbourne | 14 | 6 | |
| 31 May 1889 | Navy Team XVIII | Melbourne | 13 | 6 | |
| 11 June 1889 | Victoria | Melbourne | 19 | 0 | |
| 15 June 1889 | New South Wales | Sydney | 12 | 9 | |
| 17 June 1889 | University of Sydney | Sydney | 17 | 7 | |
| 19 June 1889 | Parramatta Club and King's School XVIII | Parramatta | 21 | 0 | |
| 22 June 1889 | New South Wales | Sydney | 16 | 12 | |
| 25 June 1889 | Arfoma | Sydney | 27 | 3 | |
| 27 June 1889 | Permanent Artillery XVIII | Sydney | 32 | 10 | |
| 13 July 1889 | Queensland | Brisbane | 22 | 0 | |
| 16 July 1889 | Toowoomba XVI | Toowoomba | 16 | 0 | |
| 18 July 1889 | Ipswich | Ipswich | 17 | 5 | |
| 20 July 1889 | Queensland | Brisbane | 11 | 7 | |
| 22 July 1889 | Toowoomba XVI | Toowoomba | 19 | 0 | |
| Total | | | 236 | 65 | |

Source: "Matches played – New Zealand Natives' rugby tour, 1888/89". nzhistory.net.nz. Archived from the original on 15 December 2013.

=== New Zealand ===
| Date | Opponents | Venue | For | Against |
|---|---|---|---|---|
| 7 August 1889 | Southland | Invercargill | 5 | 1 |
| 8 August 1889 | Mataura District XVI | Gore | 16 | 3 |
| 10 August 1889 | Otago | Dunedin | 11 | 8 |
| 15 August 1889 | Hawke's Bay | Christchurch | 13 | 2 |
| 17 August 1889 | Canterbury | Christchurch | 15 | 0 |
| 19 August 1889 | Wairarapa | Masterton | 10 | 8 |
| 20 August 1889 | Wellington | Wellington | 4 | 1 |
| 24 August 1889 | Auckland | Auckland | 2 | 7 |
| Total | | | 76 | 30 |

Source: "Matches played—New Zealand Natives' rugby tour, 1888/89". nzhistory.net.nz. Archived from the original on 15 December 2013.

=== Victorian Rules in Australia ===
| Date | Opponents | Venue | For | Against | Ref |
|---|---|---|---|---|---|
| 15 May 1889 | Maryborough | Maryborough | 8 (1/2) | 45 (6/9) | |
| 18 May 1889 | Ballarat | Ballarat | 4 (0/4) | 26 (4/2) | |
| 25 May 1889 | Carlton | Melbourne | 16 (2/4) | 94 (13/16) | |
| 28 May 1889 | Wanderers | Melbourne | 71 (10/11) | 15 (2/3) | |
| 30 May 1889 | South Melbourne | Melbourne | 40 (6/4) | 37 (4/13) | |
| 1 June 1889 | St Kilda | Melbourne | 12 (1/6) | 43 (6/7) | |
| 6 June 1889 | Daylesford | Daylesford | 16 (2/4) | 11 (1/5) | |
| 8 June 1889 | Essendon | Melbourne | 35 (5/5) | 80 (11/14) | |
| 29 June 1889 | New South Wales | Sydney | 29 (4/5) | 34 (4/10) | |
| 5 July 1889 | Northumberland | Maitland, New South Wales | 22 (3/4) | 43 (6/7) | |
| 6 July 1889 | Northern District | Newcastle | 18 (2/6) | 42 (6/6) | |
| Total | | | 271 (36/55) | 470 (63/92) | |

Source: "Matches played—New Zealand Natives' rugby tour, 1888/89". nzhistory.net.nz. Archived from the original on 15 December 2013.

=== Association football in Australia ===
| Date | Opponents | Venue | For | Against |
| Total | | | | |

Source: "Matches played – New Zealand Natives' rugby tour, 1888/89". nzhistory.net.nz. Archived from the original on 15 December 2013.

== Sources ==
- "2008 Inductee: J Warbrick & 1888 Natives Team". irb.com. 23 November 2008. Archived from the original on 14 April 2013.
- Frost, Terry (1988). Bradford City A Complete Record 1903–1988. Breedon Books Sport. ISBN 0-907969-38-0.
- "Matches played—New Zealand Natives' rugby tour, 1888/89". New Zealand Ministry for Culture and Heritage. 13 May 2013. Archived from the original on 15 December 2013.
- Mulholland, Malcolm (2009). Beneath the Māori Moon – An Illustrated History of Māori Rugby. Huia Publishers. ISBN 978-1-86969-305-3.
- "New Zealand Natives' rugby tour of 1888/89". New Zealand Ministry for Culture and Heritage. 22 January 2013. Archived from the original on 23 February 2013.
- Ryan, Greg (1993). Forerunners of the All Blacks. Christchurch, New Zealand: Canterbury University Press. ISBN 0-908812-30-2.
- "The 1905/06 'Originals'". New Zealand Rugby Museum. Archived from the original on 10 September 2012.
