= Neil McPherson (rugby union) =

British Lions & Scotland international rugby union player

- Born: Neil Clarke McPherson; 26 September 1892 Cardiff, Wales
- Died: 12 November 1957 (aged 65) Newport, Wales
- School: Durham Road School, Newport

Rugby union career
- Position(s): Prop, Flanker
Amateur team(s)
| Years | Team | Apps | (Points) |
- Newport RFC
International career
| Years | Team | Apps | (Points) |
| 1920-1923 | Scotland | 7 | (0) |
| 1924 | British Isles | 4 | (0) |

Neil McPherson OBE, (26 September 1892 – 12 November 1957) was a Welsh rugby union player who represented Scotland and the British Lions. McPherson played club rugby for Newport and captained the team in the 1921/22 season.

McPherson gained his first cap for Scotland in 1920 against Wales at Inverleith alongside teammate Dr E Fahmy, who also played his club rugby in Wales. Scotland won 9–5, and prevented Wales from winning the Grand Slam. After accepting a gold watch as part of Newport's invincible 1922/23 season, the Scottish Rugby Union suspended McPherson for what they saw as an act of professionalism; but he was later re-instated. McPherson's last game for Scotland was against Ireland, but was chosen to join the British Lions 1924 tour of South Africa, when he played in all four tests against the Springboks.

International matches played
Scotland

- England 1920, 1921, 1923
- France 1921
- Ireland 1920, 1923
- Wales 1920

British Lions

- South Africa 1924, 1924, 1924, 1924
