= 1924 British Lions tour to South Africa =

- Date: 12 July – 25 September
- Coach: Harry Packer
- Tour captain: (England) Ronald Cove-Smith
- Test series winners: South Africa (3–0)
- Top test point scorer: (England) Tom Voyce (6)
Summary
P	W	D	L
Total
21	9	3	9
Test match
3	0	0	3
Opponent
P	W	D	L
South Africa
4	0	1	3

Tour chronology
- ← South Africa 1910 Argentina 1927 →

The 1924 British Isles tour to South Africa was the tenth tour by a British Isles team and the fifth to South Africa. The tour is retrospectively classed as one of the British Lions tours, as the Lions naming convention was not adopted until 1950.

As well as South Africa, the tour included a game in Salisbury in Rhodesia, in what would become present day Harare in Zimbabwe.

== Tour history ==
Led by England's Ronald Cove-Smith and managed by former Wales international Harry Packer, the tour took in 21 matches. Of the 21 games, 17 were against club or invitational teams and four were Test matches against the South African national team. The British Isles lost three and drew one of the Test matches making it one of the least successful Lions tours to South Africa – the 1962 and 1968 tourists also lost their Test series three matches to nil with one draw. The tourist also suffered badly in the non-Test games losing six and drawing one, including a run where they failed to win over an eight-match period.

Team kit

Several reasons have been put forward regarding the poor performance of the British Isles. The team itself was fairly unrepresentative of the best the home nations could have supplied, during a period where British rugby wasn't in its finest phase. The team also suffered from a heavy attrition rate to injury attributed to the very dry South African playing pitches; conditions that once suited British back play, and were so short of players during some periods the team was forced to use players in foreign positions.

On their return at least two of the players on the tour, Roy Kinnear and Thomas Holliday went on to become dual code rugby internationals after they switched to rugby league.

The match against Orange Free State Country was a peculiar match with the home team being much weaker. Fortune shone upon the home team though, when they won the toss and decided to play with a howling wind on their backs. Half time, the wind died down and proceeded to blow with the same vengeance in the opposite direction. This advantage was enough to ensure a 6–0 win for the home side.

== Touring party ==
- Manager: Harry Packer

=== Full Backs ===
- D Drysdale (Heriots FP and Scotland)
- W.F. Gaisford (St. Bart's Hospital)
- T.E. Holliday (Aspatria)

=== Three-Quarters ===
- Rowe Harding (Swansea)
- Ian Smith (Oxford University and Scotland)^{[1]}
- Stanley "Stan" Wakefield Harris (Blackheath)
- William "Bill" Wallace (Percy Park)
- Roy Kinnear (Heriots FP and Scotland)^{[1]}
- James Bordass (Cambridge University)
- Reginald "Reg" Bellamy Maxwell (Birkenhead Park)

=== Half backs ===
- Harold Davies (Newport)
- Vince Griffiths (Newport)
- Herbert Waddell (Glasgow Academicals and Scotland)
- Bill Cunningham (Lansdowne)
- Arthur Young (Blackheath)
- Herbert Whitley (Northern)

=== Forwards ===
- R. Cove-Smith (Old Merchant Taylors) (captain)
- Arthur Frederick "Freddie" Blakiston (Blackheath)
- A. Thomas "Tom" Voyce (Gloucester)
- Neil McPherson (Newport)
- R.G. Henderson (Northern and Scotland)
- K.G.P. Hendrie (Heriots FP and Scotland)
- D.S. Davies (Hawick and Scotland)
- R.A. Howie (Kirkcaldy RFC and Scotland)
- Douglas Marsden-Jones (Cardiff and London Welsh)
- Andrew Ross (Kilmarnock and Scotland)
- Jammie Clinch (Dublin University)
- William Roche (UCC and Newport)
- Jim McVicker (Collegians)
- Michael Bradley (Dolphin)
- Norman Brand (North of Ireland FC)

^{1} Ian Smith and Roy Muir Kinnear had not been capped by Scotland at the time of the 1924 tour.

== Results ==
Complete list of matches played by the British Isles in South Africa:

Test matches

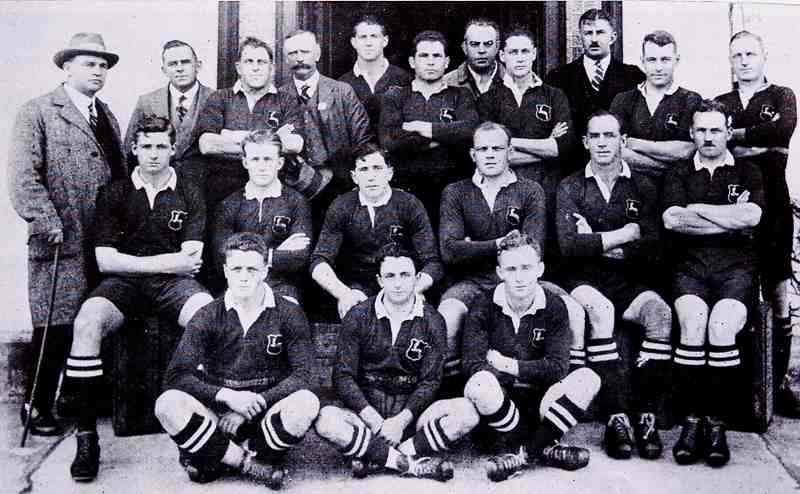
The South Africa team that played the third test v the British Isles on 13 September

#	Date	Opponent	Location	Result	Score
1	12 July	Western Province (Town & Country)	Cape Town	Lost	6–7
2	15 July	Western Province (Universities)	Cape Town	Won	9–8
3	19 July	Griqualand West	Kimberley	Won	26–0
4	24 July	Southern Rhodesia	Salisbury	Won	16–3
5	30 July	Western Transvaal	Potchefstroom	Won	8–7
6	2 August	Transvaal	Johannesburg	Drawn	12–12
7	6 August	Orange Free State (Country)	Kroonstad	Lost	0–6
8	9 August	Orange Free State	Bloemfontein	Lost	3–6
9	13 August	Natal	Pietermaritzburg	Drawn	3–3
10	16 August	South Africa	Durban	Lost	3–7
11	20 August	Witwatersrand	Johannesburg	Lost	6–10
12	23 August	South Africa	Johannesburg	Lost	0–17
13	27 August	Pretoria	Pretoria	Lost	0–6
14	30 August	Cape Colony	Kimberley	Won	13–3
15	3 September	North Eastern Districts	Aliwal North	Won	20–12
16	6 September	Border	East London	Won	12–3
17	10 September	Eastern Province	Port Elizabeth	Lost	6–14
18	13 September	South Africa	Port Elizabeth	Drawn	3–3
19	16 September	South Western Districts	Oudtshoorn	Won	12–6
20	20 September	South Africa	Cape Town	Lost	9–16
21	25 September	Western Province	Cape Town	Won	8–6

== Bibliography ==
- Thomas, Clem; Thomas, Greg (update) (2005). The History of The British and Irish Lions. Mainstream Books. pp. 66–72. ISBN 1-84596-030-0.
