= Ronald Cove-Smith =

British Lions & England international rugby union player

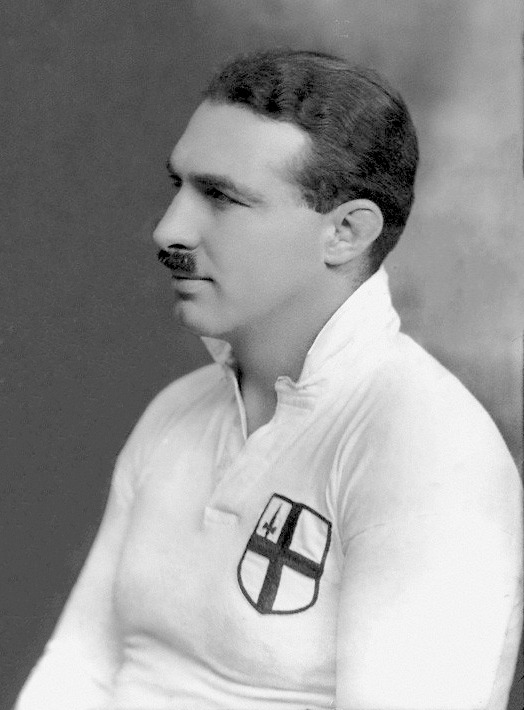
- Ronald Cove-Smith in 1933
- Born: 26 November 1899 Edmonton, London, England
- Died: 9 March 1988 (aged 88) Brighton, England
- School: Merchant Taylors' School
- University: Gonville and Caius College, Cambridge
- Notable relative: Rodney Cove-Smith (son)
- Occupation: Doctor

Rugby union career
- Position: Lock
Amateur team(s)
Years	Team	Apps	(Points)
- Cambridge University R.U.F.C.
–	Old Merchant Taylors		
–	King's College Hospital RFC		
International career
Years	Team	Apps	(Points)
1921–1929	England	29	(3)
1924	British Isles	4	(0)

Ronald Cove-Smith (26 November 1899 – 9 March 1988) was a physician and sportsman. He represented Old Merchant Taylors and King's College Hospital RFC. Internationally he represented the England national rugby union team in 29 tests (1921–1929) (seven as captain) and also captained the British Isles in four tests on the 1924 British Lions tour to South Africa as a lock. He finished on the winning side in 22 of his 29 England matches. He was commissioned in the Grenadier Guards in 1918–1919. In addition to rugby he excelled at swimming and water-polo, winning half-blues in each.

== Rugby career ==
Cove-Smith was a talented schoolboy player at Merchant Taylors' School, and carried that talent on to his time as a student at Gonville and Caius College, Cambridge, playing in three Varsity Matches for Cambridge University from 1919 to 1921, winning his sporting 'Blue'. He led the 1924 British Lions tour to South Africa, losing three of the four tests and drawing one. As captain, he led England to the 1928 Grand Slam and he was inducted onto the World Rugby Museum Wall of Fame in 2001.

He also led a distinguished medical career and served as a vice-president of the British Medical Association.

== Personal life ==
In 1933, he married Florence Margaret Harris. Together, they had three children: Rona Cove-Smith (now Blythe), Penelope Cove-Smith (now Newell-Price) and John Rodney Cove-Smith. Penelope and Rodney followed in their father's footsteps by reading medicine and Rona followed her mother in becoming a nurse, later co-authoring Guidelines for Clinical Nursing Practices: Related to a Nursing Model.

Sporting positions
Preceded by Leonard Corbett	England national rugby union team captain 1928 – February 1929	Succeeded by Joe Periton
Preceded by Tommy Smyth	British Lions captain 1924	Succeeded by David MacMyn
