= Moss-side, County Antrim =

Village in County Antrim, Northern Ireland

Coordinates: 55°09′N 6°25′W

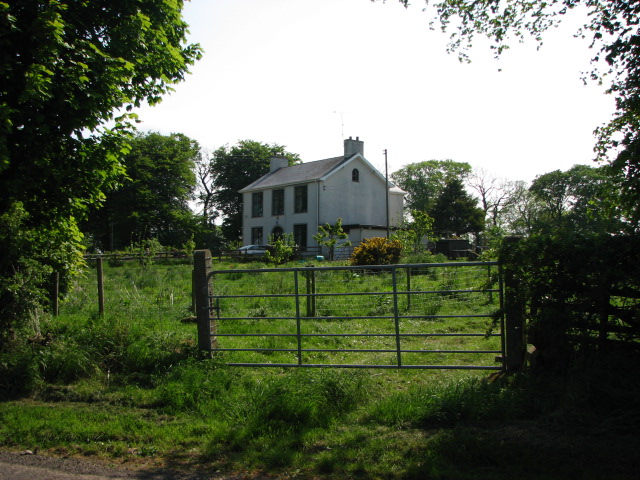
The manse, Moss-side

Moss-side or Mosside (from Scots moss side, meaning "peat-bog district" or "district beside the peat bog") is a small village and townland in County Antrim, Northern Ireland. In the 2021 census it had a population of 321 people.

It is situated in the Causeway Coast and Glens Borough Council area.

== See also ==
- List of villages in Northern Ireland
- Moss Side, an area of Manchester in England.
